= 2020–21 Bolton Wanderers F.C. season =

Bolton Wanderers
2020–21 season
- Chairman: Sharon Brittan
- Manager: Ian Evatt (Note: Head coach until 16 December 2020)
- Stadium: University of Bolton Stadium
- League Two: 3rd (promoted)
- FA Cup: First round
- EFL Cup: First round
- EFL Trophy: Group stage
- Top goalscorer: League: Eoin Doyle (19); All: Eoin Doyle (19)
Home colours	Away colours

The 2020–21 season is Bolton Wanderers's first season in the fourth tier of English football since 1988, and only their second overall, following their relegation from EFL League One to EFL League Two. It covers the period from 1 July 2020 to 30 June 2021.

== Squad ==
=== First team ===
Note: Flags indicate national team as defined under FIFA eligibility rules; some limited exceptions apply. Players may hold more than one non-FIFA nationality.

No.	Pos.	Nation	Player
1	GK	ENG	Billy Crellin (on loan from Fleetwood Town)
2	DF	AUS	Gethin Jones
4	MF	WAL	MJ Williams
5	DF	POR	Ricardo Santos
6	DF	IRL	Ryan Delaney
7	FW	ENG	Nathan Delfouneso
8	MF	MSR	Brandon Comley
9	FW	IRL	Eoin Doyle
10	MF	ENG	Antoni Sarcevic (captain)
13	GK	SCO	Matt Gilks
16	DF	GUY	Reiss Greenidge
17	MF	ENG	Ronan Darcy
18	MF	ENG	Andrew Tutte
20	FW	ENG	Shaun Miller
21	DF	ENG	Harry Brockbank
22	MF	ROU	Dennis Politic

No.	Pos.	Nation	Player
23	MF	WAL	Lloyd Isgrove
24	MF	FRA	Arthur Gnahoua
25	MF	ENG	George Thomason
26	DF	ENG	Liam Edwards
27	DF	ENG	Alex Baptiste
28	DF	WAL	Declan John (on loan from Swansea City)
29	MF	ENG	Kieran Lee
30	MF	ENG	Oladapo Afolayan (on loan from West Ham United)
31	MF	IRL	Zack Elbouzedi (on loan from Lincoln City)
32	DF	ENG	Ben Jackson (on loan from Huddersfield Town)
34	DF	ENG	Adam Senior
35	MF	ENG	Sonny Graham
36	MF	WAL	Callum King-Harmes
38	GK	DEN	Lukas Jensen (on loan from Burnley)
43	GK	ENG	Matthew Alexander

=== Out on loan ===
Note: Flags indicate national team as defined under FIFA eligibility rules; some limited exceptions apply. Players may hold more than one non-FIFA nationality.

No.	Pos.	Nation	Player
3	DF	GUY	Liam Gordon (on loan at Dagenham & Redbridge until June 2021)
11	MF	SCO	Ali Crawford (on loan at Tranmere Rovers until June 2021)
12	DF	ENG	Jak Hickman (on loan at King's Lynn Town until June 2021)

No.	Pos.	Nation	Player
15	DF	ENG	Jamie Mascoll (on loan at Waterford until June 2021)
33	FW	ENG	Muhammadu Faal (on loan at Barnet until June 2021)

=== Youth players with first team appearances ===
Note: Flags indicate national team as defined under FIFA eligibility rules; some limited exceptions apply. Players may hold more than one non-FIFA nationality.

No.	Pos.	Nation	Player
19	FW	ENG	Bright Amoateng
37	MF	ENG	Finlay Lockett

No.	Pos.	Nation	Player
47	MF	ENG	Jay Fitzmartin
49	FW	ENG	Mitchell Henry

=== Youth players with first team squad numbers ===
Note: Flags indicate national team as defined under FIFA eligibility rules; some limited exceptions apply. Players may hold more than one non-FIFA nationality.

No.	Pos.	Nation	Player
40	DF	ENG	Max Conway
41	MF	ENG	Matthew Tweedley

No.	Pos.	Nation	Player
42	MF	ENG	Kian Le Fondre
48	MF	SWE	Markus Assarsson

== Background ==
Bolton had begun the 2019–20 EFL League One season with a twelve-point reduction and never recovered. When the season was suspended and then abandoned due to the COVID-19 pandemic they had never risen above bottom place and were subsequently relegated to EFL League Two on 9 June with a points per game ratio of 0.41. Three days later, the club announced that both manager Keith Hill and his assistant David Flitcroft would not have their contracts, which ran until 30 June, extended. On 15 June, Ronan Darcy signed his first professional contract with the club, keeping him at the club until 2022. On 26 June Bolton announced that they would be releasing 14 senior players at the end of their contracts on 1 July, though also stated that when a new manager was hired they would be allowed to offer the players new contracts if they desired. On 24 June 2020 Bolton Wanderers made an official approach to Barrow for Evatt to become their manager, and Barrow demanded £250,000 compensation should he make the move. Two days later Barrow rejected Bolton's bid for his services, stating it was below the £250,000 they had asked for. On 29 June, Bolton and Barrow agreed on compensation and Bolton began discussing personal terms with Evatt. Evatt's appointment at Bolton was confirmed on 1 July 2020. On 3 July Ali Crawford returned to the club, signing a new two-year contract. The club confirmed on 9 July that Home Bargains would continue to be primary shirt sponsor for the forthcoming season. Bolton's first signing was the leading goalscorer of the 2019–20 EFL League Two season, Eoin Doyle. This was followed by the signings of Antoni Sarcevic on 15 July, George Taft on 20 July and Brandon Comley on 21 July. The same day that the club signed Comley, they announced that long serving academy director, former player and sometime caretaker manager Jimmy Phillips would be leaving his role, ending a thirty-year association with the club. On 28 July, the club announced their first loan signing of the summer with Tom White joining from Blackburn Rovers for the season. July ended with the club confirming the return of Macron as their kit supplier.

Bolton started August with the signing of Liam Gordon on a two-year deal. Further signings that month were permanent deals for Ricardo Santos, Reiss Greenidge, Gethin Jones, Nathan Delfouneso, Matt Gilks, Jak Hickman, Jamie Mascoll and Alex Baptiste, who had previously played for the club between 2013 and 2015. A season long loan deal for Billy Crellin was also completed.

== Pre-season friendlies ==
On 24 July Bolton announced a Pre-season friendly against F.C. United of Manchester on 12 August. However, the game never took place. They played unannounced pre-season friendlies against Atherton Collieries on 1 August, winning 3–0, Bamber Bridge on 8 August, winning 7–0, and Loughborough University on 11 August, winning 6–0. In the match against Loughborough University Dennis Politic was injured and it was confirmed on 20 August that he was likely to miss the whole of the forthcoming season. On 14 August Bolton announced they would play their final pre-season friendly against Championship side Blackburn Rovers on 29 August, but this was soon cancelled after Blackburn's EFL Cup match was brought forward. As a replacement, Crewe Alexandra announced they would be playing against Bolton on 28 August. Bolton beat League One side Accrington Stanley 3–0 on 22 August, but their pre-season 100% record was ended when a youthful Bolton side lost 5–1 to local rivals Wigan Athletic on 25 August. Bolton finished Pre-season with a 0–3 home defeat to newly promoted League One side Crewe Alexandra. A day later the club announced that Antoni Sarcevic had been named club captain for the forthcoming season.

1 August 2020 Friendly	Atherton Collieries	0–3	Bolton Wanderers	Atherton
		Report	Doyle 37'; Amoateng 60'; Politic 82'	Stadium: Skuna Stadium; Attendance: Behind closed doors

8 August 2020 Friendly	Bamber Bridge	0–7	Bolton Wanderers	Bamber Bridge
		Report	Delfouneso 29'; Doyle 40'; Faal 52'; Trialist 59', 66'; Politic 72' (pen.); Gordon 88'	Stadium: Sir Tom Finney Stadium; Attendance: Behind closed doors

11 August 2020 Friendly	Loughborough University	0–6	Bolton Wanderers	Loughborough
		Report	Crawford 30'; Sarcevic 31'; Taft 34'; Delfouneso (??), 54'; Gordon 51'	Stadium: Loughborough University Stadium; Attendance: Behind closed doors

22 August 2020 Friendly	Accrington Stanley	0–3	Bolton Wanderers	Bamber Bridge
		Report	Delfouneso 13'; Doyle 30' (pen.); Trialist 90+2' (pen.)	Stadium: Sir Tom Finney Stadium; Attendance: Behind closed doors

25 August 2020 Friendly	Wigan Athletic	5–1	Bolton Wanderers	Euxton
	McManaman 5'; Garner 31', 51', 52'; Trialist 82'	Report	Delfouneso 6'	Stadium: Euxton Training Ground; Attendance: Behind closed doors

28 August 2020 Friendly	Bolton Wanderers	0–3	Crewe Alexandra	Bolton
19:05 BST		Report	Powell 55'; Kirk 59'; Zanzala 85'	Stadium: University of Bolton Stadium; Attendance: Behind closed doors

== Competitions ==
=== EFL League Two ===
==== League table ====
Pos	Team	Pld	W	D	L	GF	GA	GD	Pts	Promotion, qualification or relegation
1	Cheltenham Town (C, P)	46	24	10	12	61	39	+22	82	Promotion to the EFL League One
2	Cambridge United (P)	46	24	8	14	73	49	+24	80	Promotion to the EFL League One
3	Bolton Wanderers (P)	46	23	10	13	59	50	+9	79	Promotion to the EFL League One
4	Morecambe (O, P)	46	23	9	14	69	58	+11	78	Qualification for League Two play-offs
5	Newport County	46	20	13	13	57	42	+15	73	Qualification for League Two play-offs
6	Forest Green Rovers	46	20	13	13	59	51	+8	73	Qualification for League Two play-offs
7	Tranmere Rovers	46	20	13	13	55	50	+5	73	Qualification for League Two play-offs
8	Salford City	46	19	14	13	54	34	+20	71	

Updated to match(es) played on 31 May 2021. Source: EFL Official Website
Rules for classification: 1) Points; 2) Goal difference; 3) Number of goals scored; 4) Head-to-head results; 5) Wins; 6) Away goals; 7) Penalty points (sec 9.5); 8) 12-point sending off offences
(C) Champions; (O) Play-off winners; (P) Promoted

==== Results summary ====
Overall								Home						Away					
Pld	W	D	L	GF	GA	GD	Pts	W	D	L	GF	GA	GD	W	D	L	GF	GA	GD
46	23	10	13	59	50	+9	79	11	5	7	27	23	+4	12	5	6	32	27	+5

Last updated: 8 May 2021.
Source: BBC

==== Results by matchday ====
Matchday	1	2	3	4	5	6	7	8	9	10	11	12	13	14	15	16	17	18	19	20	21	22	23	24	25	26	27	28	29	30	31	32	33	34	35	36	37	38	39	40	41	42	43	44	45	46
Ground	H	A	H	A	H	H	A	A	H	A	H	H	A	A	H	H	A	A	H	A	H	A	H	A	H	H	H	A	A	H	H	A	A	H	A	H	A	H	A	H	A	A	H	A	H	A
Result	L	L	L	W	D	L	D	D	W	L	D	W	W	W	W	L	L	W	L	D	L	D	D	L	W	D	W	W	W	W	W	W	D	W	W	W	W	D	L	W	W	L	W	W	L	W
Position	19	21	22	19	18	20	20	18	16	19	20	17	16	13	9	11	16	12	15	15	15	16	17	17	19	19	13	11	10	9	7	6	7	7	6	5	4	3	4	3	3	3	3	3	3	3

Updated to match(es) played on 8 May 2021. Source: 11v11 for league tables and fixtures
A = Away; H = Home; W = Win; D = Draw; L = Loss

==== Matches ====
The fixtures for the 2020–21 EFL League Two season were released on 21 August and saw Bolton opening their campaign at home to Forest Green Rovers on 12 September. The regular season concluded on 8 May with a trip to Crawley Town.

Win Draw Loss Postponed

12 September 2020 1	Bolton Wanderers	0–1	Forest Green Rovers	Bolton
15:00 BST	Comley (yellow card) 40'; Greenidge (yellow card) 49'; Baptiste (yellow card) 54'	Report	Kitching (yellow card) 35'; Winchester 50'	Stadium: University of Bolton Stadium; Attendance: Behind closed doors Referee: Seb Stockbridge

19 September 2020 2	Colchester United	2–0	Bolton Wanderers	Colchester
15:00 BST	Eastman 44'; Brown 71'; Chilvers (yellow card) 90'	Report	Comley (yellow card) 40'; Jones (yellow card) 52'	Stadium: Colchester Community Stadium; Attendance: Behind closed doors Referee: James Oldham

26 September 2020 3	Bolton Wanderers	0–2	Newport County	Bolton
15:00 BST	Comley (yellow card) 64'	Report	Abrahams 54', 63'; Labadie (yellow card) 67'; Cooper (yellow card) 74'; Sheehan (yellow card) 79'	Stadium: University of Bolton Stadium; Attendance: Behind closed doors Referee: Chris Sarginson

3 October 2020 4	Harrogate Town	1–2	Bolton Wanderers	Doncaster
15:00 BST	Jones (yellow card) 45+2'; Thomson 61' (yellow card) 87'; Falkingham (yellow card) 71'	Report	Doyle 11'; Delfouneso 56'; Gordon (yellow card) 73'; Hickman (yellow card) 90'	Stadium: Keepmoat Stadium; Attendance: Behind closed doors Referee: Ben Speedie

10 October 2020 5	Bolton Wanderers	0–0	Grimsby Town	Bolton
15:00 BST	Sarcevic (yellow card) 70'; Santos (yellow card) 90+7'	Report	Green (yellow card) 52'	Stadium: University of Bolton Stadium; Attendance: Behind closed doors Referee: Sam Barrott

17 October 2020 6	Bolton Wanderers	1–2	Oldham Athletic	Bolton
15:00 BST	Delfouneso 32'; Brockbank (yellow card) 48'	Report	Garrity 28' (yellow card) 63'; Hamer (yellow card) 74'; Rowe (yellow card) 84'; Piergianni (yellow card) 88'; Dearnley 90+5'	Stadium: University of Bolton Stadium; Attendance: Behind closed doors Referee: Bobby Madley

20 October 2020 7	Barrow	3–3	Bolton Wanderers	Barrow-in-Furness
19:00 BST	Taylor 1'; Jones 4' (yellow card) 45+4'; Angus 20'; Zouma (yellow card) 57'; Barry (yellow card) 66'; Brown (yellow card) 90+3'	Report	Kioso 16'; Brockbank (yellow card) 28'; Doyle 41'; Comley (yellow card) 56'; Sarcevic 90+5'	Stadium: Holker Street; Attendance: Behind closed doors Referee: Peter Wright

24 October 2020 8	Cambridge United	1–1	Bolton Wanderers	Cambridge
15:00 BST	Crellin 72' (o.g.); Iredale (yellow card) 90+4'	Report	Delaney (yellow card) 64'; Sarcevic 82'	Stadium: Abbey Stadium; Attendance: Behind closed doors Referee: Lee Swabey

27 October 2020 9	Bolton Wanderers	1–0	Bradford City	Bolton
19:00 BST	Delfouneso 13'; Delaney (yellow card) 27'; Darcy (yellow card) 90+3'	Report	Cousin-Dawson (yellow card) 51'	Stadium: University of Bolton Stadium; Attendance: Behind closed doors Referee: Ben Toner

31 October 2020 10	Leyton Orient	4–0	Bolton Wanderers	Leyton
15:00 BST	Johnson 8'; McAnuff 41'; Wilkinson 44'; Clay 57'; Cissé (yellow card) 79'	Report	Sarcevic (yellow card) 13'; Santos (yellow card) 43'; White (yellow card) 88'	Stadium: Brisbane Road; Attendance: Behind closed doors Referee: Brett Huxtable

3 November 2020 11	Bolton Wanderers	1–1	Mansfield Town	Bolton
19:00 BST	Sarcevic 90'	Report	Lapslie 57' (yellow card) 77'	Stadium: University of Bolton Stadium; Attendance: Behind closed doors Referee: Andy Haines

13 November 2020 12	Bolton Wanderers	2–0	Salford City	Bolton
19:45 BST	Doyle 24'; Turnbull 68' (o.g.)	Report		Stadium: University of Bolton Stadium; Attendance: Behind closed doors Referee: Darren Drysdale

21 November 2020 13	Stevenage	1–2	Bolton Wanderers	Stevenage
15:00 BST	Pett 44' (yellow card) 63'; Iontton (yellow card) 58'	Report	Doyle 14'; Crawford 36'; Tutte (yellow card) 54'; Delaney (yellow card) 86'; Sarcevic (yellow card) 90'	Stadium: Broadhall Way; Attendance: Behind closed doors Referee: Will Finnie

24 November 2020 14	Scunthorpe United	0–1	Bolton Wanderers	Scunthorpe
19:00 BST		Report	Kioso 57'	Stadium: Glanford Park; Attendance: Behind closed doors Referee: Martin Coy

28 November 2020 15	Bolton Wanderers	3–0	Southend United	Bolton
15:00 BST	Delfouneso 45+1'; Sarcevic (yellow card) 53'; Doyle 65' (pen.), 81'; White (yellow card) 79'	Report		Stadium: University of Bolton Stadium; Attendance: Behind closed doors Referee: John Busby

5 December 2020 16	Bolton Wanderers	3–6	Port Vale	Bolton
15:00 BST	Jones 11'; Doyle 66'; Isgrove 78'	Report	Oyeleke 6'; Legge 9'; Conlon 42' (pen.) (yellow card) 52'; Montaño 46'; Worrall 50'; Smith 62'	Stadium: University of Bolton Stadium; Attendance: Behind closed doors Referee: Carl Boyeson

12 December 2020 17	Walsall	2–1	Bolton Wanderers	Bescot
15:00 GMT	Adebayo 44'; Holden 57'; Gordon (yellow card) 74'	Report	Doyle 13'; Delaney (yellow card) 56'; Santos (yellow card) 77'	Stadium: Banks's Stadium; Attendance: Behind closed doors Referee: Michael Salisbury

15 December 2020 18	Cheltenham Town	0–1	Bolton Wanderers	Cheltenham
15:00 GMT	Sang (yellow card) 80'; Raglan (yellow card) 90+5'	Report	Delaney 90+1'	Stadium: Whaddon Road; Attendance: 1,685; Referee: Antony Coggins

19 December 2020 19	Bolton Wanderers	0–3	Tranmere Rovers	Bolton
15:00 BST		Report	Clarke 28'; Morris 68'; Vaughan 75' (pen.)	Stadium: University of Bolton Stadium; Attendance: Behind closed doors Referee: Charles Breakspear

26 December 2020 20	Carlisle United	3–3	Bolton Wanderers	Carlisle
15:00 GMT	Hayden 5'; Alessandra 7'; Riley (yellow card) 24'; Patrick 36'; Bennett (yellow card) 45+1'; Mellish (yellow card) 48'; Farman (yellow card) 64'	Report	Jones (yellow card) 22'; Thomason 44' (yellow card) 81'; Kioso (yellow card) 50' (yellow-red card) 90+4' (goal) 88'; Delfouneso 86' Evatt (yellow card)	Stadium: Brunton Park; Attendance: 2,000; Referee: Ross Joyce

29 December 2020	Bolton Wanderers	P–P	Morecambe	Bolton
19:00 GMT				Stadium: University of Bolton Stadium
Note: Match postponed due to an outbreak of COVID-19 at Morecambe F.C.

2 January 2021 21	Bolton Wanderers	0–1	Crawley Town	Bolton
15:00 GMT	Brockbank (yellow card) 41'; Greenidge (yellow card) 64' (yellow-red card) 90+4'	Report	Francomb 61'	Stadium: University of Bolton Stadium; Attendance: Behind closed doors Referee: Sam Barrott

12 January 2021 22	Exeter City	1–1	Bolton Wanderers	Bolton
19:00 GMT	Santos 62' (o.g.); Atangana (yellow card) 67'	Report	Sarcevic (yellow card) 53'; Brockbank (yellow card) 60'; Gnahoua 73'	Stadium: St James Park; Attendance: Behind closed doors Referee: Sam Allison

16 January 2021 23	Bolton Wanderers	1–1	Cheltenham Town	Bolton
15:00 GMT	Isgrove (yellow card) 78'; Doyle 86'	Report	May 54'	Stadium: University of Bolton Stadium; Attendance: Behind closed doors Referee: Andy Haines

23 January 2021 24	Tranmere Rovers	2–1	Bolton Wanderers	Birkenhead
15:00 GMT	Lloyd 4'; Monthé (yellow card) 40'; Vaughan 56' (pen.); Clarke (yellow card) 57'	Report	Delaney (yellow card) 55' (yellow-red card) 75'; Sarcevic 66'	Stadium: Prenton Park; Attendance: Behind closed doors Referee: Neil Hair

26 January 2021	Mansfield Town	P–P	Bolton Wanderers	Mansfield
19:00 GMT				Stadium: Field Mill
Note: Match postponed due to a frozen pitch at Mansfield Town F.C.

30 January 2021 25	Bolton Wanderers	2–0	Leyton Orient	Bolton
15:00 GMT	Brophy 67' (o.g.); Doyle 69'	Report		Stadium: University of Bolton Stadium; Attendance: Behind closed doors Referee: Sam Purkiss

2 February 2021	Mansfield Town	P–P	Bolton Wanderers	Mansfield
19:00 GMT				Stadium: Field Mill
Note: Match postponed due to a water logged pitch at Mansfield Town F.C.

6 February 2021	Salford City	P–P	Bolton Wanderers	Salford
15:00 GMT				Stadium: Moor Lane
Note: Match postponed due to a water logged pitch at Salford City F.C.

9 February 2021 26	Bolton Wanderers	1–1	Morecambe	Bolton
19:00 GMT	Doyle 43'; Maddison (red card) 73'; Williams (yellow card) 80'	Report	Lyons 83'	Stadium: University of Bolton Stadium; Attendance: Behind closed doors Referee: Oliver Langford

13 February 2021 27	Bolton Wanderers	1–0	Stevenage	Bolton
15:00 GMT	John 7'; Williams (red card) 78'; Thomason (yellow card) 85'	Report		Stadium: University of Bolton Stadium; Attendance: Behind closed doors Referee: Trevor Kettle

17 February 2021 28	Mansfield Town	2–3	Bolton Wanderers	Mansfield
17:00 GMT	Charsley (yellow card) 2'; Perch (yellow card) 11'; Clarke 65'; Reid 72'	Report	John 79'; Benning 85' (o.g.); Gnahoua 89'	Stadium: One Call Stadium; Attendance: Behind closed doors Referee: Antony Coggins

20 February 2021 29	Southend United	0–1	Bolton Wanderers	Southend-on-Sea
15:00 GMT	Ferguson (yellow card) 32'; Bwomono (yellow card) 83'	Report	Williams (yellow card) 75'; Miller 82'; John (yellow card) 85'	Stadium: Roots Hall; Attendance: Behind closed doors Referee: Declan Bourne

23 February 2021 30	Bolton Wanderers	2–0	Scunthorpe United	Bolton
19:00 GMT	John (yellow card) 26'; Doyle 37' (pen.) (yellow card) 68'; Thomason (yellow card) 62'; Sarcevic 74'; Williams (yellow card) 84'	Report	McGahey (yellow card) 62'	Stadium: University of Bolton Stadium; Attendance: Behind closed doors Referee: Anthony Backhouse

27 February 2021 31	Bolton Wanderers	1–0	Barrow	Bolton
15:00 GMT	Miller 90+3'	Report	Brough (yellow card) 43'; Dixon (yellow card) 65'	Stadium: University of Bolton Stadium; Attendance: Behind closed doors Referee: Alan Young

2 March 2021 32	Oldham Athletic	0–2	Bolton Wanderers	Oldham
19:00 GMT	Jameson (red card) 29'; Piergianni (yellow card) 65'	Report	Clarke 19' (o.g.); Doyle 39'; Lee (yellow card) 56'	Stadium: Boundary Park; Attendance: Behind closed doors Referee: James Oldham

6 March 2021 33	Bradford City	1–1	Bolton Wanderers	Bradford
15:00 GMT	O'Connor (yellow card) 62'; Rowe 90+3'	Report	Santos (yellow card) 62'; Delfouneso 83'	Stadium: Utilita Energy Stadium; Attendance: Behind closed doors Referee: Leigh Doughty

9 March 2021 34	Bolton Wanderers	2–1	Cambridge United	Bolton
19:00 GMT	Doyle 38'; Sarcevic 43'; Lee (yellow card) 90+4'	Report	Mullin (yellow card) 49'; Ironside (yellow card) 58'; Drysdale (yellow card) 59'; Knoyle 80'	Stadium: University of Bolton Stadium; Attendance: Behind closed doors Referee: Peter Wright

13 March 2021 35	Port Vale	0–1	Bolton Wanderers	Burslem
15:00 GMT	Mills (yellow card) 70'; Legge (yellow card) 79'	Report	Jones 63'; Gilks (yellow card) 89'	Stadium: Vale Park; Attendance: Behind closed doors Referee: Craig Hicks

20 March 2021 36	Bolton Wanderers	2–1	Walsall	Bolton
15:00 GMT	Lee 67'; Doyle 80' (pen.); John (yellow card) 86'	Report	Perry 28'; Clarke (yellow card) 45'; White (red card) 73'; Norman (yellow card) 90+2'	Stadium: University of Bolton Stadium; Attendance: Behind closed doors Referee: Seb Stockbridge

27 March 2021 37	Forest Green Rovers	0–1	Bolton Wanderers	Nailsworth
12:00 GMT	Collins (yellow card) 76'	Report	Doyle 39'	Stadium: The New Lawn; Attendance: Behind closed doors Referee: David Rock

2 April 2021 38	Bolton Wanderers	0–0	Colchester United	Bolton
15:00 GMT		Report		Stadium: University of Bolton Stadium; Attendance: Behind closed doors Referee: Ollie Yates

5 April 2021 39	Newport County	1–0	Bolton Wanderers	Newport
15:00 BST	Bennett (yellow card) 45+1'; Maynard 63'; Labadie (yellow card) 90+3'	Report		Stadium: Rodney Parade; Attendance: Behind closed doors Referee: Graham Salisbury

10 April 2021 40	Bolton Wanderers	2–1	Harrogate Town	Bolton
15:00 GMT	Lee (Note: This goal was originally attributed to Lloyd Isgrove and still listed as such by some sources, was actually scored by Kieran Lee.) 53'; Doyle 78'; Williams (yellow card) 85'	Report	Beck 13'; Kerry (yellow card) 39'; Francis (yellow card) 71'	Stadium: University of Bolton Stadium; Attendance: Behind closed doors Referee: Sam Allison

13 April 2021 41	Salford City	0–1	Bolton Wanderers	Salford
19:00 GMT	Clarke (yellow card) 23'; Burgess (yellow card) 80'; Hunter (yellow card) 87'	Report	Isgrove 23'; Lee (yellow card) 29'; Williams (yellow card) 45'; Thomason (yellow card) 76'	Stadium: Moor Lane; Attendance: Behind closed doors Referee: Alan Young

17 April 2021 42	Grimsby Town	2–1	Bolton Wanderers	Cleethorpes
12:30 BST	Matete 1' (yellow card) 78'; Khouri (yellow card) 34'; Clifton (yellow card) 59'; Jackson Jr 86'	Report	Williams (yellow card) 6'; Miller 90+6'	Stadium: Blundell Park; Attendance: Behind closed doors Referee: Carl Brook

20 April 2021 43	Bolton Wanderers	1–0	Carlisle United	Bolton
19:00 GMT	Doyle 28'; Santos (yellow card) 61'	Report	Riley (yellow card) 56'	Stadium: University of Bolton Stadium; Attendance: Behind closed doors Referee: Martin Coy

24 April 2021 44	Morecambe	0–1	Bolton Wanderers	Morecambe
15:00 BST	Mellor (red card) 23'; Price (yellow card) 49'	Report	Afolayan (yellow card) 40'; Jackson 45+3'	Stadium: Mazuma Stadium; Attendance: Behind closed doors Referee: Carl Boyeson

1 May 2021 45	Bolton Wanderers	1–2	Exeter City	Bolton
15:00 GMT	Jones 15'; Baptiste (yellow card) 32'; Williams (yellow card) 37'	Report	Key (yellow card) 27'; Hartridge (yellow card) 29'; Willmott (yellow card) 42'; Williams 49'; Taylor (yellow card) 78'; Sparkes (yellow card) 84'; Sweeney 90+5'	Stadium: University of Bolton Stadium; Attendance: Behind closed doors Referee: Anthony Backhouse

8 May 2021 46	Crawley Town	1–4	Bolton Wanderers	Crawley
15:00 GMT	Francomb (yellow card) 12' (yellow-red card) 32'; Tsaroulla (yellow card) 45+3'; Nadesan (yellow card) 75'; Powell (yellow card) 79'; Rodari 89'	Report	Sarcevic 9'; Afolayan 26'; Doyle 48'; Isgrove 77'	Stadium: The People's Pension Stadium; Attendance: Behind closed doors Referee: Bobby Madley

=== FA Cup ===
Win Draw Loss

The draw for the first round was made on Monday 26, October.

7 November 2020 First round	Bolton Wanderers	2–3	Crewe Alexandra	Bolton
15:00 BST	Delfouneso 37', 78'	Report	Mandron 29'; Finney 70'; Kirk 75'	Stadium: University of Bolton Stadium; Attendance: Behind closed doors Referee: Robert Lewis

=== EFL Cup ===
Bolton will enter the EFL Cup at the first round stage, along with all other League One and League Two club and the majority of Championship clubs. The draw was made on 18 August and saw Bolton face Bradford City in the first round.

Win Draw Loss

5 September 2020 First round	Bolton Wanderers	1–2	Bradford City	Bolton
15:00 BST	Sarcevic 47'	Report	Novak 26'; Pritchard 75' (yellow card) 90+1'	Stadium: University of Bolton Stadium; Attendance: Behind closed doors Referee: Martin Coy

=== EFL Trophy ===
On 17 August, Bolton were drawn with Crewe Alexandra and Shrewsbury Town in the group stage of the EFL Trophy. The regional group stage draw was confirmed on 18 August with Newcastle United U21 completing the group.

Pos	Div	Team	Pld	W	PW	PL	L	GF	GA	GD	Pts	Qualification
1	L1	Shrewsbury Town	3	3	0	0	0	9	4	+5	9	Advance to Round 2
2	L1	Crewe Alexandra	3	2	0	0	1	7	6	+1	6	Advance to Round 2
3	L2	Bolton Wanderers	3	1	0	0	2	6	7	−1	3	
4	ACA	Newcastle United U21	3	0	0	0	3	2	7	−5	0	

Source: EFL.com

Win Draw Loss

8 September 2020 Group stage	Bolton Wanderers	2–3	Crewe Alexandra	Bolton
19:00 BST	White (yellow card) 31'; Delaney (yellow card) 47' (goal) 53'; Miller 75'; Taft (yellow card) 89'	Report	Mandron 15', 89' (pen.); Dale 66'	Stadium: University of Bolton Stadium; Attendance: Behind closed doors Referee: Anthony Backhouse

6 October 2020 Group stage	Shrewsbury Town	2–1	Bolton Wanderers	Shrewsbury
17:30 BST	Barnett 19'; Walker (yellow card) 23'; Vela (yellow card) 32'; Cummings 43' (yellow card) 45+3'; Pierre (yellow card) 78'; High (yellow card) 85'	Report	Senior 64' (yellow card) 80'	Stadium: Montgomery Waters Meadow; Attendance: Behind closed doors Referee: Ollie Yates

17 November 2020 Group stage	Bolton Wanderers	3–2	Newcastle United U21	Bolton
19:00 GMT	Greenidge (yellow card) 41'; Hickman 43'; White (yellow card) 51'; Gnahoua 69'; Mascoll 85'	Report	Anderson 11', 40' (yellow card) 61'; Flaherty (yellow card) 51'; Vilca (yellow card) 68'	Stadium: University of Bolton Stadium; Attendance: Behind closed doors Referee: Ollie Yates

=== Statistics ===
As of match played 8 May 2021

No.	Pos	Nat	Player	Total		League Two		FA Cup		League Cup		EFL Trophy	
No.	Pos	Nat	Player	Apps	Goals	Apps	Goals	Apps	Goals	Apps	Goals	Apps	Goals
Goalkeepers
1	GK	(England) ENG	Billy Crellin	16	0	11+0	0	1+0	0	1+0	0	3+0	0
13	GK	(Scotland) SCO	Matt Gilks	35	0	35+0	0	0+0	0	0+0	0	0+0	0
Defenders
2	DF	(Australia) AUS	Gethin Jones	40	3	37+1	3	0+0	0	1+0	0	0+1	0
5	DF	(Portugal) POR	Ricardo Santos	48	0	46+0	0	1+0	0	1+0	0	0+0	0
6	DF	(Republic of Ireland) IRL	Ryan Delaney	23	2	20+0	1	1+0	0	0+0	0	2+0	1
16	DF	(Guyana) GUY	Reiss Greenidge	7	0	3+2	0	0+0	0	0+0	0	1+1	0
21	DF	(England) ENG	Harry Brockbank	19	0	13+5	0	0+0	0	0+0	0	1+0	0
27	DF	(England) ENG	Alex Baptiste	42	0	38+2	0	1+0	0	1+0	0	0+0	0
28	DF	(Wales) WAL	Declan John	21	2	19+2	2	0+0	0	0+0	0	0+0	0
32	DF	(England) ENG	Ben Jackson	5	1	5+0	1	0+0	0	0+0	0	0+0	0
34	DF	(England) ENG	Adam Senior	1	1	0+0	0	0+0	0	0+0	0	1+0	1
Midfielders
4	MF	(Wales) WAL	MJ Williams	21	0	21+0	0	0+0	0	0+0	0	0+0	0
8	MF	(Montserrat) MSR	Brandon Comley	14	0	5+5	0	0+0	0	1+0	0	2+1	0
10	MF	(England) ENG	Antoni Sarcevic	35	8	29+3	7	1+0	0	1+0	1	1+0	0
17	MF	(England) ENG	Ronan Darcy	11	0	1+7	0	1+0	0	0+0	0	2+0	0
18	MF	(England) ENG	Andrew Tutte	20	0	13+6	0	0+1	0	0+0	0	0+0	0
23	MF	(Wales) WAL	Lloyd Isgrove	34	3	21+11	3	0+1	0	0+0	0	1+0	0
24	MF	(France) FRA	Arthur Gnahoua	30	3	6+22	2	0+0	0	0+0	0	1+1	1
25	MF	(England) ENG	George Thomason	25	1	18+6	1	0+0	0	0+0	0	0+1	0
29	MF	(England) ENG	Kieran Lee	20	2	20+0	2	0+0	0	0+0	0	0+0	0
30	MF	(England) ENG	Oladapo Afolayan	21	1	19+2	1	0+0	0	0+0	0	0+0	0
31	MF	(Republic of Ireland) IRL	Zack Elbouzedi	14	0	2+12	0	0+0	0	0+0	0	0+0	0
37	MF	(England) ENG	Finlay Lockett	2	0	0+1	0	0+0	0	0+0	0	1+0	0
Forwards
7	FW	(England) ENG	Nathan Delfouneso	46	8	32+11	6	1+0	2	1+0	0	1+0	0
9	FW	(Republic of Ireland) IRL	Eoin Doyle	44	19	42+0	19	0+0	0	1+0	0	1+0	0
19	FW	(England) ENG	Bright Amoateng	1	0	0+1	0	0+0	0	0+0	0	0+0	0
20	FW	(England) ENG	Shaun Miller	24	4	0+20	3	0+1	0	0+1	0	1+1	1
49	FW	(England) ENG	Mitchell Henry	1	0	0+0	0	0+0	0	0+0	0	0+1	0
Out on loan:
3	DF	(Guyana) GUY	Liam Gordon	15	0	4+6	0	1+0	0	1+0	0	3+0	0
11	MF	(Scotland) SCO	Ali Crawford	24	1	17+4	1	1+0	0	0+1	0	1+0	0
12	DF	(England) ENG	Jak Hickman	7	1	3+1	0	0+0	0	0+0	0	3+0	1
15	DF	(England) ENG	Jamie Mascoll	9	1	2+5	0	0+0	0	0+0	0	1+1	1
Left during the season:
4	DF	(England) ENG	George Taft	5	0	1+0	0	0+0	0	1+0	0	3+0	0
14	MF	(England) ENG	Marcus Maddison	10	0	4+6	0	0+0	0	0+0	0	0+0	0
14	MF	(England) ENG	Tom White	14	0	4+5	0	1+0	0	1+0	0	3+0	0
30	DF	(Republic of Ireland) IRL	Peter Kioso	14	3	13+0	3	1+0	0	0+0	0	0+0	0
44	MF	(England) ENG	Regan Riley	1	0	0+0	0	0+0	0	0+0	0	0+1	0

=== Goals record ===
As of match played 8 May 2021

Rank	No.	Nat.	Po.	Name	League Two	FA Cup	League Cup	EFL Trophy	Total
1	9	(Republic of Ireland)	CF	Eoin Doyle	19	0	0	0	19
2	7	(England)	CF	Nathan Delfouneso	6	2	0	0	8
2	10	(England)	CM	Antoni Sarcevic	7	0	1	0	8
4	20	(England)	CF	Shaun Miller	3	0	0	1	4
5	2	(Australia)	RB	Gethin Jones	3	0	0	0	3
5	23	(Wales)	RW	Lloyd Isgrove	3	0	0	0	3
5	24	(France)	LW	Arthur Gnahoua	2	0	0	1	3
5	-	(Republic of Ireland)	RB	Peter Kioso	3	0	0	0	3
9	6	(Republic of Ireland)	CB	Ryan Delaney	1	0	0	1	2
9	28	(Wales)	LB	Declan John	2	0	0	0	2
9	29	(England)	CM	Kieran Lee	2	0	0	0	2
12	11	(Scotland)	CM	Ali Crawford	1	0	0	0	1
12	12	(England)	RB	Jak Hickman	0	0	0	1	1
12	15	(England)	LB	Jamie Mascoll	0	0	0	1	1
12	25	(England)	CM	George Thomason	1	0	0	0	1
12	30	(England)	LW	Oladapo Afolayan	1	0	0	0	1
12	32	(England)	LB	Ben Jackson	1	0	0	0	1
12	34	(England)	CB	Adam Senior	0	0	0	1	1
Own Goals					4	0	0	0	4
Total					59	2	1	6	68

=== Disciplinary record ===
As of match played 8 May 2021

Rank	No.	Nat.	Po.	Name	League Two			FA Cup			League Cup			EFL Trophy			Total		
Rank	No.	Nat.	Po.	Name	Booked	(yellow card) (yellow-red card)	Sent off (straight red)	Booked	(yellow card) (yellow-red card)	Sent off (straight red)	Booked	(yellow card) (yellow-red card)	Sent off (straight red)	Booked	(yellow card) (yellow-red card)	Sent off (straight red)	Booked	(yellow card) (yellow-red card)	Sent off (straight red)
1	4	(Wales)	CM	MJ Williams	7	0	1	0	0	0	0	0	0	0	0	0	7	0	1
2	6	(Republic of Ireland)	CB	Ryan Delaney	4	1	0	0	0	0	0	0	0	1	0	0	5	1	0
3	5	(Portugal)	CB	Ricardo Santos	5	0	0	0	0	0	0	0	0	0	0	0	5	0	0
3	10	(England)	CM	Antoni Sarcevic	5	0	0	0	0	0	0	0	0	0	0	0	5	0	0
3	16	(Guyana)	CB	Reiss Greenidge	1	1	0	0	0	0	0	0	0	1	0	0	2	1	0
6	8	(Montserrat)	CM	Brandon Comley	4	0	0	0	0	0	0	0	0	0	0	0	4	0	0
6	21	(England)	CB	Harry Brockbank	4	0	0	0	0	0	0	0	0	0	0	0	4	0	0
6	25	(England)	CM	George Thomason	4	0	0	0	0	0	0	0	0	0	0	0	4	0	0
6	-	(England)	CM	Tom White	2	0	0	0	0	0	0	0	0	2	0	0	4	0	0
10	14	(England)	RW	Marcus Maddison	0	0	1	0	0	0	0	0	0	0	0	0	0	0	1
10	28	(Wales)	LB	Declan John	3	0	0	0	0	0	0	0	0	0	0	0	3	0	0
10	29	(England)	CM	Kieran Lee	3	0	0	0	0	0	0	0	0	0	0	0	3	0	0
10	-	(Republic of Ireland)	RB	Peter Kioso	0	1	0	0	0	0	0	0	0	0	0	0	0	1	0
14	2	(Australia)	RB	Gethin Jones	2	0	0	0	0	0	0	0	0	0	0	0	2	0	0
14	27	(England)	CB	Alex Baptiste	2	0	0	0	0	0	0	0	0	0	0	0	2	0	0
16	3	(Guyana)	LB	Liam Gordon	1	0	0	0	0	0	0	0	0	0	0	0	1	0	0
16	9	(Republic of Ireland)	CF	Eoin Doyle	1	0	0	0	0	0	0	0	0	0	0	0	1	0	0
16	12	(England)	RB	Jak Hickman	1	0	0	0	0	0	0	0	0	0	0	0	1	0	0
16	13	(Scotland)	GK	Matt Gilks	1	0	0	0	0	0	0	0	0	0	0	0	1	0	0
16	17	(England)	CM	Ronan Darcy	1	0	0	0	0	0	0	0	0	0	0	0	1	0	0
16	18	(England)	CM	Andrew Tutte	1	0	0	0	0	0	0	0	0	0	0	0	1	0	0
16	23	(Wales)	RW	Lloyd Isgrove	1	0	0	0	0	0	0	0	0	0	0	0	1	0	0
16	30	(England)	LW	Oladapo Afolayan	1	0	0	0	0	0	0	0	0	0	0	0	1	0	0
16	34	(England)	CB	Adam Senior	0	0	0	0	0	0	0	0	0	1	0	0	1	0	0
16	-	(England)	CB	George Taft	0	0	0	0	0	0	0	0	0	1	0	0	1	0	0
Total					53	3	2	0	0	0	0	0	0	6	0	0	59	3	2

== Transfers ==
=== Transfers in ===
Date	Position	Nationality	Name	From	Fee	Ref.
10 July 2020	CF	(Republic of Ireland)	Eoin Doyle	(England) Swindon Town	Free transfer	
15 July 2020	CM	(England)	Antoni Sarcevic	(England) Plymouth Argyle	Free transfer	
20 July 2020	CB	(England)	George Taft	(England) Cambridge United	Free transfer	
21 July 2020	CM	(Montserrat)	Brandon Comley	(England) Colchester United	Free transfer	
1 August 2020	LB	(Guyana)	Liam Gordon	(England) Dagenham & Redbridge	Free transfer	
3 August 2020	CB	(Portugal)	Ricardo Santos	(England) Barnet	Free transfer	
4 August 2020	CB	(Guyana)	Reiss Greenidge	(Norway) Arendal	Free transfer	
4 August 2020	RB	(Australia)	Gethin Jones	(England) Carlisle United	Free transfer	
6 August 2020	CF	(England)	Nathan Delfouneso	(England) Blackpool	Free transfer	
6 August 2020	GK	(Scotland)	Matt Gilks	(England) Fleetwood Town	Free transfer	
6 August 2020	RB	(England)	Jak Hickman	(England) Coventry City	Free transfer	
7 August 2020	CB	(England)	Alex Baptiste	(England) Doncaster Rovers	Free transfer	
24 August 2020	LB	(England)	Jamie Mascoll	(England) Wycombe Wanderers	Free transfer	
3 September 2020	CM	(England)	Andrew Tutte	(England) Morecambe	Free transfer	
4 September 2020	CF	(England)	Bright Amoateng	Free agent	Free transfer	
5 September 2020	CF	(England)	Shaun Miller	(England) Crewe Alexandra	Free transfer	
26 September 2020	LW	(France)	Arthur Gnahoua	(England) Macclesfield Town	Free transfer	
26 September 2020	RW	(Wales)	Lloyd Isgrove	(England) Swindon Town	Free transfer	
8 January 2021	DM	(England)	Kieran Lee	(England) Sheffield Wednesday	Free transfer	
1 February 2021	DM	(Wales)	MJ Williams	(England) Blackpool	Free transfer	

=== Loans in ===
Date from	Position	Nationality	Name	From	Date until	Ref.
28 July 2020	CM	(England)	Tom White	(England) Blackburn Rovers	2 February 2021	
3 August 2020	GK	(England)	Billy Crellin	(England) Fleetwood Town	End of season	
15 October 2020	RB	(Republic of Ireland)	Peter Kioso	(England) Luton Town	11 January 2021	
7 January 2021	LB	(Wales)	Declan John	(Wales) Swansea City	End of season	
16 January 2021	LW	(Republic of Ireland)	Zack Elbouzedi	(England) Lincoln City	End of season	
16 January 2021	LB	(England)	Ben Jackson	(England) Huddersfield Town	End of season	
1 February 2021	LW	(England)	Oladapo Afolayan	(England) West Ham United	End of season	
1 February 2021	GK	(Denmark)	Lukas Jensen	(England) Burnley	End of season	
1 February 2021	AM	(England)	Marcus Maddison	(England) Charlton Athletic	12 April 2021	
2021	CM	(Northern Ireland)	Liam Coyle	(England) Liverpool	2021	

=== Loans out ===
Date from	Position	Nationality	Name	To	Date until	Ref.
31 August 2020	RM	(Wales)	Callum King-Harmes	(England) Bamber Bridge	21 February 2021	
31 August 2020	CM	(England)	George Thomason	(England) Bamber Bridge	17 November 2020	
6 November 2020	CF	(England)	Muhammadu Faal	(England) Barnet	End of season	
17 December 2020	LB	(Guyana)	Liam Gordon	(England) Dagenham & Redbridge	End of season	
7 January 2021	CB	(England)	George Taft	(England) Scunthorpe United	1 February 2021	
1 February 2021	CM	(Scotland)	Ali Crawford	(England) Tranmere Rovers	End of season	
24 February 2021	LB	(England)	Jamie Mascoll	(Republic of Ireland) Waterford	End of season	
5 March 2021	RB	(England)	Jak Hickman	(England) King's Lynn Town	End of season	

=== Transfers out ===
Date	Position	Nationality	Name	To	Fee	Ref.
1 July 2020	AM	(England)	Will Buckley	Free agent	Free transfer	
1 July 2020	CF	(England)	Eddie Brown	Free agent	Free transfer	
1 July 2020	CF	(England)	De'Marlio Brown-Sterling	Free agent	Free transfer	
1 July 2020	LB	(England)	Joe Bunney	(England) Matlock Town	Free transfer	
1 July 2020	CF	(Ghana)	Joe Dodoo	(Turkey) Ankara Keçiörengücü	Free transfer	
1 July 2020	LB	(England)	Myles Edmondson	Free agent	Free transfer	
1 July 2020	RB	(England)	Josh Emmanuel	(England) Hull City	Free transfer	
1 July 2020	CF	(England)	Connor Hall	(England) Woking	Free transfer	
1 July 2020	CB	(England)	Jack Hobbs	Free agent	Free transfer	
1 July 2020	CM	(England)	Jason Lowe	(England) Salford City	Free transfer	
1 July 2020	GK	(England)	Remi Matthews	(England) Sunderland	Free transfer	
1 July 2020	CM	(England)	Jacob Mellis	(England) Gillingham	Free transfer	
1 July 2020	CF	(Republic of Ireland)	Daryl Murphy	(Republic of Ireland) Waterford	Free transfer	
1 July 2020	CM	(England)	Luke Murphy	(England) Crewe Alexandra	Free transfer	
1 July 2020	CF	(England)	Chris O'Grady	Free agent	Free transfer	
1 July 2020	CM	(England)	Kwame Osigwe	Free agent	Free transfer	
1 July 2020	CB	(England)	D'Neal Richards	Free agent	Free transfer	
1 July 2020	LB	(England)	Joe White	(England) Lower Breck	Free transfer	
1 July 2020	CB	(France)	Yoan Zouma	(England) Barrow	Free transfer	
1 February 2021	AM	(England)	Regan Riley	(England) Norwich City	£250,000	
1 February 2021	CB	(England)	George Taft	(England) Scunthorpe United	Free transfer	
