= Jordan Boon =

English footballer

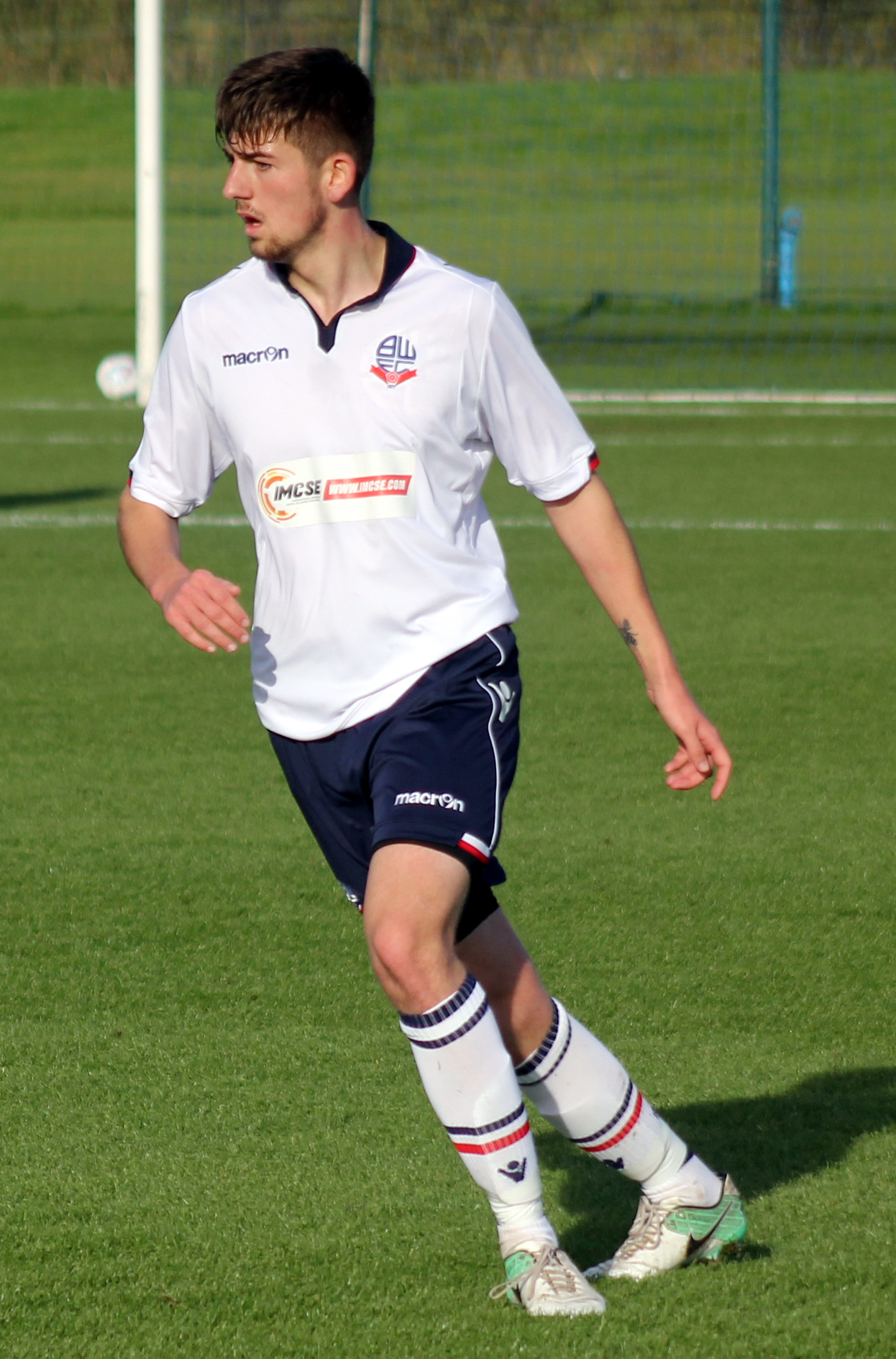
- Boon playing for Bolton Wanderers U18s in November 2017

Personal information
- Full name: Jordan Mark Boon
- Date of birth: 26 November 2000 (age 25)
- Place of birth: Stockport, England
- Position: Defender

Team information
- Current team: Fencibles United
- Number: 7

Youth career
- Bolton Wanderers

Senior career*
Years	Team	Apps	(Gls)
2018–2020	Bolton Wanderers	3	(0)
2018–2019	→ Northwich Victoria (loan)	3	(0)
2020	→ Atherton Collieries (loan)		
2020	IFK Östersund	0	(0)
2020	Spennymoor Town		
2021–2022	Poynton FC	8	(1)
2022	Banyule City		
2022–2023	Wythenshawe Town		
2023–2024	Atherton Collieries	19	(0)
2024	Ngaruawahia United	21	(0)
2024	Stalybridge Celtic	8	(1)
2025–	Fencibles United	17	(0)
2026	Tupapa Maraerenga F.C. (loan)		
- * Club domestic league appearances and goals as of August 2026

Jordan Mark Boon (born 26 November 2000) is a professional footballer who plays as a defender for New Zealand Northern League club Fencibles United.

== Career ==
=== Bolton Wanderers ===
Boon came through the Bolton Wanderers Academy. In December 2019, Boon joined Northwich Victoria on a one-month loan deal. He made his debut against Irlam on 26 December as a 7th minute substitute, replacing Kieron Kenny in an eventual 4–0 win. He played two more league matches for Northwich Victoria before returning to Bolton in January 2019. On 21 May 2019, Bolton extended Boon's scholarship contract for another year. He made his professional debut on 13 August 2019 against Rochdale in the EFL Cup, coming on as a 54th minute substitute, replacing Liam Edwards. Bolton lost by 5–2. Four days later he made his league debut against Tranmere Rovers, coming on as a 68th minute substitute for Joe White. Bolton lost by 5–0. His first start came on 31 August in another 5–0 defeat. On 31 January 2020, Boon joined Atherton Collieries on loan. He made his debut a day later in a 3–1 defeat against Whitby Town. This was the only match he played for them before returning to Bolton.

=== IFK Östersund ===
On 11 March 2020, Boon left Bolton by mutual consent to join Swedish Division 2 side IFK Östersund. Within the first few weeks of training Boon suffered an injury and then lead him fly back home with other factors including the COVID-19 pandemic making him unable to return.

=== Spennymoor Town ===
On 19 September 2020 Boon signed for Spennymoor Town after a successful trial. He played three matches. He was released on 18 December.

=== Poynton FC ===
He signed for Cheshire Association Football League Premier Division side Poynton FC for the 2021–22 season.

=== Banyule City ===
On 3 January 2022, he signed for Victorian State League Division 1 side Banyule City in Australia.

=== Wythenshawe Town ===
He signed for Wythenshawe Town for the 2022–23 season.

=== Atherton Collieries ===
In July 2023, Boon returned to Atherton Collieries having previously spent time with the club on loan.

=== Ngaruawahia United ===
On 15 March 2024, Ngaruawahia United from New Zealand announced they had signed Boon for the 2024 season and that he would be the captain for the season.

=== Stalybridge Celtic ===
In September 2024, Boon returned to England, joining Northern Premier League Division One West club Stalybridge Celtic. He departed from the club later that year.

=== Fencibles United ===
In February 2025, Boon returned to New Zealand, joining Northern League club Fencibles United.

== Career statistics ==
As of match played 5 September 2026

Appearances and goals by club, season and competition
Club	Season	League			National Cup (Note: Includes games in FA Cup and Chatham Cup.)		League Cup		Other		Total	
Club	Season	Division	Apps	Goals	Apps	Goals	Apps	Goals	Apps	Goals	Apps	Goals
Bolton Wanderers	2018–19	Championship	0	0	0	0	0	0	0	0	0	0
Bolton Wanderers	2019–20	League One	3	0	0	0	1	0	1 (Note: Appearance(s) in the EFL Trophy.)	0	5	0
Bolton Wanderers	Total		3	0	0	0	1	0	1	0	5	0
Northwich Victoria (loan)	2018–19	NWC Premier Division	3	0	–	–	–	–	0	0	3	0
Atherton Collieries (loan)	2019–20	Northern Premier League	1	0	–	–	–	–	–	–	1	0
IFK Östersund	2020	Division 2 Norrland	0	0	0	0	0	0	0	0	0	0
Spennymoor Town	2020–21	National League North	1	0	2	0	–	–	0	0	3	0
Poynton FC	2021–22	CAFL Premier Division	8	1	0	0	–	–	0	0	8	1
Banyule City	2022–23	VSL Division 1	?	?	?	?	–	–	?	?	?	?
Wythenshawe Town	2022–23	NWC Premier Division	13	8	0	0	–	–	1 (Note: Appearance(s) in the Manchester Premier Cup.)	1	14	9
Atherton Collieries	2023–24	NPL Premier Division	19	0	1	0	—		0	0	20	0
Fencibles United	2025	National League	17	0	2	0	—		—		19	0
Fencibles United	2026	National League	21	1	5	0	—		—		26	1
Fencibles United	Total		38	1	7	0	0	0	0	0	45	1
Tupapa Maraerenga (loan)	2026	Round Cup	0	0	0	0	—		3 (Note: Appearance(s) in the OFC Champions League.)	0	3	0
Career total			86	10	10	0	1	0	5	1	102	11

== Honours ==
Fencibles United

- Chatham Cup: 2026
