= Muhammadu Faal =

English footballer (born 1997)

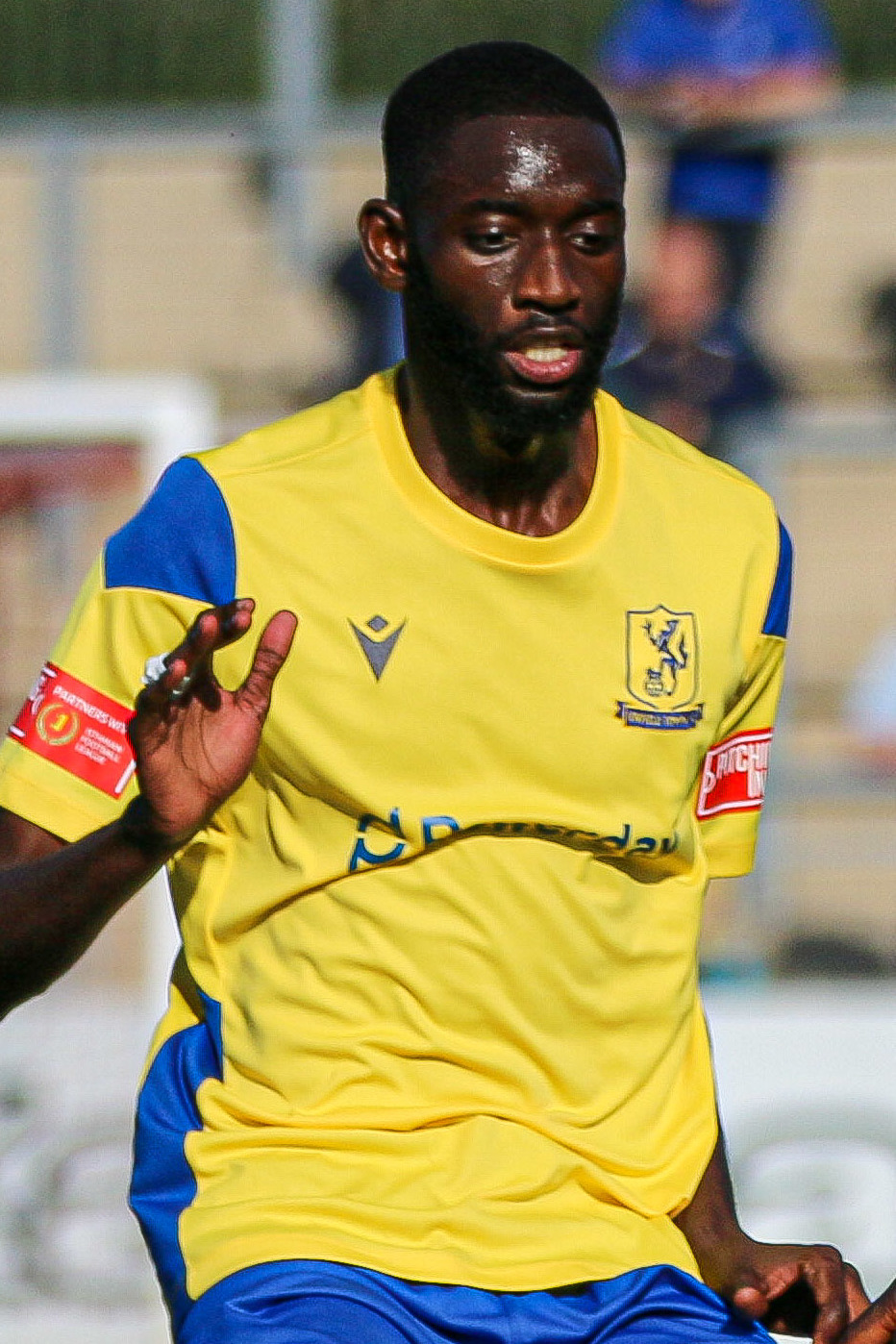
- Faal with Enfield Town in 2021

Personal information
- Full name: Muhammadu Mustapha Faal
- Date of birth: 1 July 1997 (age 29)
- Place of birth: Hackney, England
- Height: 6 ft 5 in (1.96 m)
- Position: Forward

Youth career
- Ryan
- 2013–2015: Boreham Wood

Senior career*
Years	Team	Apps	(Gls)
2015–2017	L'Aquila	8	(0)
2017	→ San Gregorio (loan)		
2017	Waltham Forest	1	(0)
2017–2018	Dulwich Hamlet	17	(4)
2018	→ Kingstonian (loan)	8	(7)
2018	Kingstonian	9	(2)
2018–2020	Enfield Town	23	(20)
2020–2021	Bolton Wanderers	2	(0)
2020–2021	→ Barnet (loan)	20	(0)
2021–2022	Enfield Town	43	(35)
2022–2024	Havant & Waterlooville	66	(28)
2024	→ Maidstone United (loan)	20	(7)
2024	Crawley Town	0	(0)
2024–2025	Worthing	37	(13)
2025	Waterford	6	(0)
2026	Maidstone United	12	(3)
- * Club domestic league appearances and goals as of 16:30, 1 May 2026 (UTC)

Muhammadu Mustapha Faal (born 1 July 1997) is an English professional footballer who plays as a forward.

== Career ==
Faal began his career in the youth team at Chingford-based Ryan before completing a scholarship at Boreham Wood from 2013 to 2015. He then joined Italian club L'Aquila in the 2015–16 season. He played eight times in Lega Pro and Serie D, and also played in the Promozione on loan at San Gregorio, before returning to England and joining Waltham Forest at the start of the 2017–18 season. After only one game, he joined Dulwich Hamlet, where he played 25 times in all competitions and scored six times. Faal joined Kingstonian on loan in March 2018 where he scored seven times in eight games. The loan was made permanent at the end of the season.

Faal joined Enfield Town in December 2018. After only five appearances in the remainder of the 2018–19 season, he went on trial at Dumbarton before returning to North London and scoring 24 goals in 25 games in all competitions in the first half of the 2019–20 season before joining Bolton Wanderers on an 18-month contract on 6 January 2020. He made his debut on 11 January in a 0–2 defeat against Rochdale, coming on as a substitute for Sonny Graham in the 66th minute. After spending the first few months of the 2020–21 season injured, Faal joined Barnet on a season-long loan on 6 November 2020, with an option to make the deal permanent in January. On 19 May 2021, Bolton announced that he would be released at the end of his contract. Faal re-joined Enfield Town in August 2021. His first game came on 14 August where he scored twice in a 4–2 win against Carshalton Athletic.

On 2 August 2022, Faal joined National League South club Havant & Waterloovile following the expiration of his contract with Enfield Town. In January 2024, he joined Maidstone United on loan for the remainder of the season.

On 22 July 2024, Faal joined League One club Crawley Town on a six-month contract. His contract included an option to extend it by 18 months, which was against EFL regulations as the extension cannot be longer than the actual contract. He said he was he was later told he failed his medical, but then was told shortly afterwards that this was a "miscommunication". Crawley were unable to register him due to the contract. He also said they refused to provide him a copy of the contract. He said they then sent him a "proof of termination of contract" document to sign, but he refused to sign it and said he would take the club to an employment tribunal. He eventually joined Worthing in September. Both teams said they paid a fee for him, but Faal disputed this saying that they would be unable to receive a fee for an unregistered player and said Crawley admitted they had said this to "help the image of all parties involved". Having finished the season as the club's top goalscorer, his departure was confirmed on 26 June 2025.

On 15 August 2025, Faal signed an 18 month contract with League of Ireland Premier Division club Waterford. On 25 November 2025, it was announced that Faal's Waterford contract had been terminated by mutual consent, having failed to score a goal in 8 appearances in all competitions for the club.

In January 2026, Faal returned to National League South club Maidstone United on an eighteen-month deal. On 3 March 2026, Faal suffered a ruptured anterior cruciate ligament in a match with Weston-super-Mare. He departed the club at the end of the 2025–26 season.

== Personal life ==
Faal is the cousin of England international Joe Gomez. He is eligible to play for the Gambia.

== Career statistics ==
As of match played on 7 November 2025

Appearances and goals by club, season and competition
Club	Season	League			National Cup		League Cup		Other		Total	
Club	Season	Division	Apps	Goals	Apps	Goals	Apps	Goals	Apps	Goals	Apps	Goals
L'Aquila	2015–16	Lega Pro Girone B	1	0	0	0	—		0	0	1	0
L'Aquila	2016–17	Serie D Girone G	7	0	0	0	—		0	0	7	0
L'Aquila	Total		8	0	0	0	0	0	0	0	8	0
Waltham Forest	2017–18	Essex Senior League	1	0	0	0	—		0	0	1	0
Dulwich Hamlet	2017–18	Isthmian League Premier Division	17	4	2	0	—		6 (Note: Two appearances in FA Trophy, four appearances and two goals in Alan Turvey Trophy.)	2	25	6
Kingstonian (loan)	2017–18	Isthmian League Premier Division	8	7	0	0	—		0	0	8	7
Kingstonian	2018–19	Isthmian League Premier Division	9	2	1	0	—		4 (Note: Two appearances in FA Trophy, one appearance in Alan Turvey Trophy, one appearance and one goal in Surrey Senior Cup.)	1	14	3
Enfield Town	2018–19	Isthmian League Premier Division	5	3	0	0	—		0	0	5	3
Enfield Town	2019–20	Isthmian League Premier Division	18	17	2	3	—		5 (Note: Appearances in the FA Trophy.)	4	25	24
Enfield Town	Total		23	20	2	3	0	0	5	4	30	27
Bolton Wanderers	2019–20	League One	2	0	0	0	0	0	0	0	2	0
Bolton Wanderers	2020–21	League Two	0	0	0	0	0	0	0	0	0	0
Bolton Wanderers	Total		2	0	0	0	0	0	0	0	2	0
Barnet (loan)	2020–21	National League	20	0 (Note: The goal scored on 2 December 2020, originally attributed to Faal and still listed as such by some sources, was actually scored by Wesley Fonguck.)	1	0	—		1	0	22	0
Enfield Town	2021–22	Isthmian League Premier Division	43	35	4	2	—		4 (Note: Three appearances and one goal in FA Trophy, one appearance and one goal in Isthmian League Premier Division playoffs.)	2	51	39
Havant & Waterlooville	2022–23	National League South	43	21	3	1	—		1	0	47	22
Havant & Waterlooville	2023–24	National League South	23	7	1	1	—		1	0	25	8
Havant & Waterlooville	Total		66	28	4	2	—		2	0	72	30
Maidstone United (loan)	2023–24	National League South	20	7	—		—		—		20	7
Crawley Town	2024–25	League One	0	0	0	0	0	0	0	0	0	0
Worthing	2024–25	National League South	37	13	3	3	—		2	4	42	20
Waterford	2025	LOI Premier Division	6	0	1	0	—		1 (Note: Appearance in the 2025 League of Ireland Promotion/Relegation play-off)	0	8	0
Career total			260	116	18	10	0	0	25	13	303	139
