= George Thomason (footballer) =

English footballer (born 2001)

Personal information
- Full name: George Andrew Thomason
- Date of birth: 12 January 2001 (age 25)
- Place of birth: Barrow in Furness, England
- Height: 1.77 m (5 ft 10 in)
- Positions: Midfielder; left wing-back

Team information
- Current team: Wrexham
- Number: 14

Youth career
- 2009–2018: Blackpool

Senior career*
Years	Team	Apps	(Gls)
2018–2020	Longridge Town		
2020–2025	Bolton Wanderers	134	(12)
2020	→ Bamber Bridge (loan)	5	(0)
2020	→ Bamber Bridge (loan)	7	(2)
2025–	Wrexham	35	(3)
- * Club domestic league appearances and goals as of 00:42, 5 November 2026 (UTC)

George Andrew Thomason (born 12 January 2001) is an English professional footballer who plays as a midfielder for EFL Championship side Wrexham.

== Career ==
=== Early career ===
Thomason spent his most of youth as a left-back at Blackpool, signing as an 8-year-old but was released as a 16-year-old.

After signing for Longridge Town, he was converted into a central midfielder by manager Lee Ashcroft and scored two goals in 26 league appearances in the North West Counties League for Longridge Town in the 2019–20 season.

=== Bolton Wanderers ===
Thomason was signed by Bolton Wanderers in January 2020. As part of the deal, Bolton agreed to play a pre-season friendly against Longridge Town the following season, although the match happened during pre season for 2021–22 season instead. The match finished 3–1 to Bolton, with Thomason playing 45 minutes.

On 31 January 2020, he was loaned out to Northern Premier League Premier Division club Bamber Bridge. He returned to Bamber Bridge the following season, alongside teammate Callum King-Harmes, before being recalled in November as non-League football was suspended due to the COVID-19 pandemic in England. He made his debut for the "Trotters" on 17 November 2020, in a 3–2 victory over Newcastle United U21 in the EFL Trophy. He made his English Football League debut on 5 December, in a 6–3 home defeat to Port Vale. On 26 December 2020, he scored his first Bolton―and first professional―goal, scoring Bolton's first goal in a 3–3 draw against Carlisle United. His performances in December saw him voted by the Bolton fans as Bolton Player of the Month. On 12 February 2021, he signed a new 18-month contract. On 21 May 2021, he was named Bolton's Young Player of the Year for the 2020–21 season. On 5 November, he signed a one-year contract extension, extending it to at least 2023. On 2 December 2022, in a match against Bristol Rovers, Thomason went off injured with the injury possibly ruling him out for the rest of the season. Two weeks later, on 15 December, he signed a new contract with Bolton until 2025 with the option of an extra year. He returned much earlier than expected, however, for he was back in training in February. On 2 April, he came on as a substitute in the 2023 EFL Trophy Final against Plymouth Argyle. Bolton went on to win 4–0. On 14 August 2023, EFL Championship side Bristol City had a £1 million bid accepted for him, though Thomason turned them down preferring to stay at Bolton. He signed a new four-year contract a day later. On 21 September 2024, Thomason was named as the new Bolton captain.

=== Wrexham ===
On 21 July 2025, signed a three-year contract with recently promoted EFL Championship side Wrexham, with it reported by The Bolton News they paid £1.2 million. He returned to his prior youth team position of left-back during his time at Wrexham.

== Style of play ==
Thomason is a box-to-box midfielder. Bolton manager Ian Evatt said that Thomason has excellent positioning skills, vision and has a "wonderful left foot".

== Career statistics ==
As of match played 4 November 2026

Appearances and goals by club, season and competition
Club	Season	League			FA Cup		League Cup		Other		Total	
Club	Season	Division	Apps	Goals	Apps	Goals	Apps	Goals	Apps	Goals	Apps	Goals
Longridge Town	2018–19	NWCFL Division One North	11	0	0	0	—		1 (Note: Appearance in First Division Champions Cup)	0	12	0
Longridge Town	2019–20	NWCFL Premier Division	26	2	3	0	—		6 (Note: Appearances in FA Vase and Macron Challenge Cup)	0	35	2
Longridge Town	Total		37	2	3	0	0	0	6	0	47	2
Bolton Wanderers	2019–20	League One	0	0	0	0	0	0	0	0	0	0
Bolton Wanderers	2020–21	League Two	24	1	0	0	0	0	1 (Note: Appearance in EFL Trophy)	0	25	1
Bolton Wanderers	2021–22	League One	13	1	2	0	1	0	5	0	21	1
Bolton Wanderers	2022–23	League One	20	0	1	0	1	0	3 (Note: Two appearances in the EFL Trophy, one appearance in the League One play-offs)	0	25	0
Bolton Wanderers	2023–24	League One	39	6	3	0	2	0	8 (Note: Five appearances in EFL Trophy, three appearances in League One play-offs)	0	52	6
Bolton Wanderers	2024–25	League One	38	4	0	0	3	1	5	0	46	5
Bolton Wanderers	Total		134	12	6	0	7	1	22	0	169	13
Bamber Bridge (loan)	2019–20	Northern Premier League	5	0	0	0	—		0	0	5	0
Bamber Bridge (loan)	2020–21	Northern Premier League	7	2	0	0	—		1 (Note: Appearance in FA Trophy)	0	8	2
Bamber Bridge (loan)	Total		12	2	0	0	0	0	1	0	13	2
Wrexham	2025–26	Championship	31	2	3	0	2	0	—		36	2
Wrexham	2026–27	Championship	4	1	0	0	1	0	0	0	5	1
Wrexham	Total		35	3	3	0	3	0	0	0	41	3
Career total			207	19	12	0	10	1	29	0	258	20

== Honours ==
Longridge Town

- North West Counties Football League Division One North: 2018–19

Bolton Wanderers

- EFL League Two third-place (promotion): 2020–21
- EFL Trophy: 2022–23
