= Matthew Alexander (footballer) =

English footballer

Personal information
- Full name: Matthew Alexander
- Date of birth: 7 May 2002 (age 24)
- Place of birth: Newcastle-upon-Tyne, England
- Position: Goalkeeper

Team information
- Current team: Alnwick Town

Youth career
- Newcastle United
- Bolton Wanderers

Senior career*
| Years | Team | Apps | (Gls) |
| 2019–2022 | Bolton Wanderers | 1 | (0) |
| 2021 | → Lancaster City (loan) | 13 | (0) |
| 2022 | → Runcorn Linnets (loan) | 1 | (0) |
| 2022– | Alnwick Town | | |
| 2022–2023 | → Blyth Spartans (dual-reg.) | 0 | (0) |
- * Club domestic league appearances and goals as of 02:54, 13 February 2022 (UTC)

Matthew Alexander (born 7 May 2002) is an English professional footballer who plays as a goalkeeper for Alnwick Town in the Ebac Northern League Division Two

== Career ==
On 10 August 2019, Alexander made his Bolton Wanderers debut in a 0–0 draw at home to Coventry City, in which Bolton fielded their youngest ever team, due to financial difficulties. He signed his first professional contract with Bolton Wanderers on 15 May 2020, penning a one-year deal. A year later, Bolton revealed he was contracted for the 2021–2022 season.

On 19 July 2021 it was announced that he would join Lancaster City on a season long loan, though the loan wouldn't officially start until a later date to allow him to take part in both Lancaster and Bolton's pre-seasons. The loan became "official" on 7 August and he made his competitive debut on 14 August in a 1–0 defeat against Whitby Town. Alexander was named Man of the Match despite Lancaster losing. Alexander started the season as first choice Goalkeeper, however he lost his place to fellow loanee Aidan Dowling and his loan was terminated early on 23 November. On 4 February 2022, he joined Runcorn Linnets on loan until the end of the season. He made his debut a day later in a 2–0 defeat against Trafford but picked up an injury during the match, causing him to miss the rest of the season. On 3 May 2022 the club confirmed that he would be released at the end of his contract.

Following his release, Alexander joined Northern Alliance Premier Division side, Alnwick Town before spending time dual-registered with Blyth Spartans of the National League North.

== Career statistics ==
As of match played 5 February 2022.

Appearances and goals by club, season and competition
| Club | Season | League | | | FA Cup | | League Cup | | Other | | Total | |
| Club | Season | Division | Apps | Goals | Apps | Goals | Apps | Goals | Apps | Goals | Apps | Goals |
|---|---|---|---|---|---|---|---|---|---|---|---|---|
| Bolton Wanderers | 2019–20 | League One | 1 | 0 | 0 | 0 | 0 | 0 | 1 (Note: Appearance(s) in the EFL Trophy.) | 0 | 2 | 0 |
| Bolton Wanderers | 2020–21 | League Two | 0 | 0 | 0 | 0 | 0 | 0 | 0 | 0 | 0 | 0 |
| Bolton Wanderers | 2021–22 | League One | 0 | 0 | — | | 0 | 0 | 0 | 0 | 0 | 0 |
| Bolton Wanderers | Total | | 1 | 0 | 0 | 0 | 0 | 0 | 1 | 0 | 2 | 0 |
| Lancaster City (loan) | 2021–22 | Northern Premier League Premier Division | 13 | 0 | 2 | 0 | — | | 1 (Note: Appearance(s) in the Lancashire FA Challenge Trophy.) | 0 | 16 | 0 |
| Runcorn Linnets (loan) | 2021–22 | Northern Premier League Division One West | 1 | 0 | — | | — | | 0 | 0 | 1 | 0 |
| Alnwick Town | 2022–23 | Northern Alliance Premier Division | No data currently available | | | | | | | | | |
| Blyth Spartans (dual-reg.) | 2022–23 | National League North | 0 | 0 | 0 | 0 | — | | 0 | 0 | 0 | 0 |
| Career total | | | 15 | 0 | 2 | 0 | 0 | 0 | 2 | 0 | 19 | 0 |
