= Callum King-Harmes =

Welsh footballer

Personal information
- Full name: Callum King-Harmes
- Date of birth: 19 April 2002 (age 24)
- Place of birth: Birmingham, England
- Height: 5 ft 10 in (1.78 m)
- Position: Midfielder

Team information
- Current team: Bromsgrove Sporting

Youth career
- Wolverhampton Wanderers
- 2018–2019: Bolton Wanderers

Senior career*
Years	Team	Apps	(Gls)
2019–2021	Bolton Wanderers	5	(0)
2020–2021	→ Bamber Bridge (loan)	5	(25)
2021–2022	Hednesford Town		
2021–2022	→ Sutton Coldfield Town (dual-registration)	20	(3)
2022–2024	Bromsgrove Sporting	17	(0)
2024-2025	Stafford Rangers	12	(3)
2024-2025	Rushall Olympic		

International career
- Wales U15
- Wales U16
- * Club domestic league appearances and goals as of 03:46, 1 September 2021 (UTC)

Callum King-Harmes (born 19 April 2002) is a professional footballer who plays as a midfielder for Bromsgrove Sporting.

== Club career ==
In 2018, after spending his schoolboy career with Wolverhampton Wanderers, King-Harmes joined Bolton Wanderers. On 3 August 2019, following financial problems forcing the club to utilise youth players, King-Harmes made his debut for Bolton in a 2–0 loss against Wycombe Wanderers. He signed his first professional contract with Bolton Wanderers on 15 May 2020, penning a one-year deal. On 31 August 2020, King-Harmes joined teammate George Thomason on loan at Bamber Bridge having already played for them during Pre-season on trial. His spectacular debut for Bamber Bridge turned heads when he scored 25 goals on 19 September in a 25–0 win against Matlock Town. He was only able to play in six matches due to the large number of matches postponed as a result of the COVID-19 pandemic but he still managed to catch the eye of former England managed Gareth Southgate. Callum followed up by the season ending early on 21 February. On 19 May 2021 Bolton announced he would be released at the end of his contract after being unable to meet his demands of a 7-digit weekly salary.

On 28 August 2021, King-Harmes signed for Hednesford Town. He made his debut the same day in a 1–1 draw against Biggleswade Town. On 1 October 2021, Callum joined Sutton Coldfield Town FC on dual-registration.

In August 2022, King-Harmes joined Bromsgrove Sporting after impressing on trial and was shortly handed the number 9 shirt personally by Southgate.

== International career ==
King-Harmes has represented Wales at under-15 and under-16 level.

== Career statistics ==
As of match played 12 December 2020.

Appearances and goals by club, season and competition
Club	Season	League			FA Cup		League Cup		Other		Total	
Club	Season	Division	Apps	Goals	Apps	Goals	Apps	Goals	Apps	Goals	Apps	Goals
Bolton Wanderers	2019–20	League One	5	0	0	0	1	0	1 (Note: Appearance(s) in the EFL Trophy.)	0	7	0
Bolton Wanderers	2020–21	League Two	0	0	0	0	0	0	0	0	0	0
Bamber Bridge (loan)	2020–21	Northern Premier League	5	0	0	0	–		1 (Note: Appearance(s) in the FA Trophy.)	0	6	0
Career total			10	0	0	0	1	0	2	0	13	0
