= Jay Fitzmartin =

English footballer

Personal information
- Full name: Jay Leon Fitzmartin
- Date of birth: 14 September 2002 (age 24)
- Place of birth: Leigh, England
- Position: Winger

Team information
- Current team: Hednesford Town FC

Youth career
- Eastleigh Juniors
- Atherton Town
- 2013–2021: Bolton Wanderers

Senior career*
Years	Team	Apps	(Gls)
2019–2022	Bolton Wanderers	0	(0)
2021	→ Stalybridge Celtic (loan)	8	(1)
2022	→ Stalybridge Celtic (loan)	3	(0)
2022–2023	Atherton Collieries	36	(8)
2023 - 2026	FC United of Manchester	15	(2)
2026	Hednesford Town		
- * Club domestic league appearances and goals as of 23.12, 6 July 2026 (UTC)

Jay Leon Fitzmartin is an English Professional footballer who plays for Hednesford Town FC.

== Career ==
Born in Leigh, Fitzmartin played youth football for Ragnarson and Sons and Atherton Town, before joining Bolton Wanderers aged 11. In June 2019, Fitzmartin signed scholarship forms with Bolton. On 3 September 2019, Fitzmartin made his debut for Bolton in a 1–1 EFL Trophy draw against Bradford City. He returned to the U-18 for the 20–21 season. On 21 June 2021 he signed his first professional contract signing until June 2022. On 3 September 2021, he joined Stalybridge Celtic on loan until January 2022. His debut came a day later when he started in a 1–0 defeat in the FA Cup against Colne. On 14 September, he provided all 3 assists in a 3–0 win against Scarborough Athletic. On 25 September, he scored the first goal of his career when he scored the second goal in a 5–2 win against F.C. United of Manchester.

At the end of February 2022 he returned to Stalybridge Celtic on loan until the end of the season, after his previous period with the club was cut short by an injury. He returned to the club in late March after having made four further appearances for the club. On 3 May, Bolton confirmed that he would be released at the end of his contract.

In July 2022, Fitzmartin signed for Atherton Collieries.

In July 2026, Fitzmartin moved from FC United of Manchester to Hednesford Town FC for an undisclosed fee, with Niall Watson going in the opposite direction on a 12 month loan.

== Career statistics ==
As of match played 22 April 2023.

Appearances and goals by club, season and competition
Club	Season	League			FA Cup		League Cup		Other		Total	
Club	Season	Division	Apps	Goals	Apps	Goals	Apps	Goals	Apps	Goals	Apps	Goals
Bolton Wanderers	2019–20	League One	0	0	0	0	0	0	1 (Note: Appearance(s) in EFL Trophy)	0	1	0
Bolton Wanderers	2020–21	League Two	0	0	0	0	0	0	0	0	0	0
Bolton Wanderers	2021–22	League One	0	0	0	0	0	0	0	0	0	0
Bolton Wanderers	Total		0	0	0	0	0	0	1	0	1	0
Stalybridge Celtic (loan)	2021–22	Northern Premier League	11	1	1	0	–		0	0	12	1
Atherton Collieries	2022–23	Northern Premier League	36	8	1	0	–		4 (Note: Appearance(s) in FA Trophy)	0	41	8
Career total			47	9	2	0	0	0	5	0	54	9
