= 2019–20 Bolton Wanderers F.C. season =

Bolton Wanderers F.C.
2019–20 season
- Chairperson: Sharon Brittan
- Manager: Phil Parkinson (until 21 August); Keith Hill (from 31 August)
- Stadium: University of Bolton Stadium
- League One: 23rd (relegated)
- FA Cup: First round
- EFL Cup: First round
- EFL Trophy: Second round
- Top goalscorer: League: Daryl Murphy (8); All: Daryl Murphy (8)
- Highest home attendance: 14,003 vs. Blackpool, 8 October 2019
- Lowest home attendance: 2,616 vs. Manchester City U21, 29 October 2019
- Average home league attendance: 11,157
- Biggest win: 3–1 vs. Manchester City U21, EFL Trophy, 29 October 2019
- Biggest defeat: 1–7 vs. Accrington Stanley, EFL League One, 23 November 2019
Home colours	Away (October–present) colours	Away (August–October) colours

The 2019–20 season was Bolton Wanderers's first season back in League One following their relegation last season from the Championship. Along with the league the club also participated in the FA Cup, EFL Cup, and the EFL Trophy. The season covered the period from 1 July 2019 to 30 June 2020.

== Background ==
Throughout the 2018–19 Championship season Bolton faced financial difficulties. After the collapse of the permanent signing of on-loan striker Christian Doidge, Forest Green Rovers commenced legal action over lost earnings. In February 2019, Bolton were issued a winding-up petition by HM Revenue & Customs (HMRC) which was subsequently adjourned, first until April, and then again until the end of the season as their search for a new owner continued. Due to the financial difficulties, the training ground temporarily closed in March 2019, and games against Ipswich, Middlesbrough and Aston Villa were threatened with postponement or being played behind closed doors as the local council Safety Advisory Group (SAG) threatened to revoke the stadium safety certificate. The Bolton Whites Hotel, owned by Ken Anderson, was also issued with a winding-up petition in March 2019 (it closed on 1 May and went into administration on 14 May). The team was relegated to League One in April after a 23rd-place finish. In a further development on 26 April, the home match against Brentford was called off by the English Football League 16 hours before kick off after Bolton's players, supported by the Professional Footballers' Association, refused to play until they had received their unpaid wages. On 3 May the match against Brentford was cancelled by the EFL and a 1–0 result and three points awarded to Brentford.

In May the club went into administration due to a £1.2m unpaid tax bill. Fildraw (former owner Eddie Davies' trust fund) appointed administrators from insolvency firm David Rubin and Partners. In accordance with league rules on administration, Bolton would start the 2019–20 season with a 12-point deduction. On 14 May it was reported that some non-playing staff were forced to use food bank donations from local businesses and a local Championship club, believed to be Preston North End, as Bolton had not paid them for April's work. A 17 July statement from the Bolton players said that no-one at the club had been paid by owner Ken Anderson for 20 weeks, the training ground had no potable drinking water nor hot water for showers. Pre-season friendlies with Chester, Preston and Oldham Athletic were all cancelled as Bolton could not give assurances about fielding a competitive team.

== Season summary ==
On 18 July, Anderson said the sale of Bolton would be completed by the end of the week, but the uncertainty continued into August. Bolton started their opening League One game on 3 August at Wycombe Wanderers with only three contracted senior outfield players, and lost 2–0. The following week, on 8 August, Bolton's takeover by Football Ventures was suspended after Laurence Bassini, who had previously tried to buy the club, won a court order blocking the sale; the sale of the Bolton Whites hotel was also delayed by a dispute. On 10 August, Bolton fielded its youngest ever side, with an average age of 19, in a goalless home draw against Coventry City, but then conceded five goals in both of the next two games, against Rochdale in the EFL Cup (5-2) and Tranmere Rovers in League One (5-0). Manager Phil Parkinson expressed concern about the welfare of the youth players used in all of Bolton's games; such concerns led Bolton to call off the game against Doncaster Rovers on 20 August but without informing either Doncaster or the EFL. Parkinson and assistant Steve Parkin resigned the following day. The club confirmed that academy manager Jimmy Phillips would take temporary charge of the club. Wanderers lost 5–0 at home to Ipswich Town in Phillips' first game in charge of Bolton, in front of a record low crowd at the University of Bolton Stadium.

An EFL deadline of 5PM BST on 27 August had been imposed on Bolton to prove their financial viability under current ownership or complete a takeover deal, with failure to satisfy this criterion by the deadline resulting in Bolton's EFL membership being revoked, and consequently the beginning of a liquidation process of the club and its assets. However, on 26 August, joint administrator Paul Appleton announced that the Football Ventures takeover had fallen through on the morning of 24 August, having looked close to completion the previous day. After Bolton failed to meet 27 August deadline, the suspension of its notice of withdrawal from the EFL was lifted; however, the club was not immediately expelled from the EFL - it was given until 12 September 2019 to meet all outstanding requirements of the League's insolvency policy.

On 28 August, Bolton announced that the club's sale to Football Ventures (Whites) Limited had been completed, with the administrator paying tribute to the Eddie Davies Trust and their legal team, and criticising Anderson who had "used his position as a secured creditor to hamper and frustrate any deal that did not benefit him or suit his purposes." On 31 August, shortly after Bolton lost a fourth consecutive game conceding five goals in each, Keith Hill was announced as the new club manager. Bolton's first game under Hill saw the club lose 6–1 to Rotherham United, before picking up their first point under Hill on 17 September 2019 in a 0–0 draw at home to Oxford United. Bolton won their first game of the season on 22 October 2019 in a 2–0 win away at Bristol Rovers, before winning a further three consecutive matches in all competitions, taking the club to a positive points total for the first time.

Bolton struggled to find form throughout the 2019-20 campaign, winning just 5 of their 34 matches up to 10 March. The EFL League One season was suspended on 13 March due to the ongoing COVID-19 pandemic. On 9 June, the season was ended with promotion, play off, and relegation positions determined on a points-per-game basis.

This condemned the club to relegation and Bolton Wanderers competed in the 2020-21 League Two campaign.

This was the second time in the club's 146-year history that they have played football in England's fourth tier. The previous occasion came in the 1987-88 campaign, in which Bolton were similarly promoted back to the third tier at the first attempt.

== Pre-season ==
Like the season before against St Mirren, the Bolton first team refused to play the match against Chester due to unpaid wages. They also refused to play in the Preston game as well. Following this, Oldham Athletic cancelled a third game as Bolton could not give assurances about fielding a competitive team. Bolton were able to schedule last minute replacements matches against Bradford City and Salford City, though the matches had to be played behind closed doors.

14 July 2019 Friendly	York City	1–0	Bolton Wanderers XI	York
14:00 BST	Kempster 31'	Report		Stadium: Bootham Crescent; Attendance: 666

16 July 2019 Friendly	Bolton Wanderers	2–3	Al-Ittihad	Bolton
	Oztumer 20'; Hall 30'	Report; Report	Prijović 13'; Al-Ghamdi 69'; Al-Bishi 72'	Attendance: Behind closed doors

19 July 2019 Friendly	Chester	v	Bolton Wanderers	Chester
19:45 BST		Match Cancelled		Stadium: Deva Stadium

23 July 2019 Friendly	Bolton Wanderers	v	Preston North End	Leyland
19:45 BST		Match Cancelled		Stadium: County Ground

23 July 2019 Friendly	Bolton Wanderers	2–1	Bradford City	Bolton
	Politic; Murphy	Report	Vaughan (pen.)	Attendance: Behind closed doors

27 July 2019 Friendly	Oldham Athletic	v	Bolton Wanderers	Oldham
15:00 BST		Match Cancelled		Stadium: Boundary Park

27 July 2019 Friendly	Bolton Wanderers	1–0	Salford City	Bolton
	Oztumer	Report		Attendance: Behind closed doors

== Kits ==
Home (August–October)	Home (since October)	Away (August–October)	Away (since October)

== Competitions ==
=== EFL League One ===
Bolton Wanderers will begin the 2019–20 campaign with a 12-point deduction complying with league rules for entering into administration.

==== League table ====
Pos	Team	Pld	W	D	L	GF	GA	GD	Pts	PPG	Promotion, qualification or relegation
17	Accrington Stanley	35	10	10	15	47	53	−6	40	1.14	
18	Rochdale	34	10	6	18	39	57	−18	36	1.06	
19	Milton Keynes Dons	35	10	7	18	36	47	−11	37	1.06	
20	AFC Wimbledon	35	8	11	16	39	52	−13	35	1.00	
21	Tranmere Rovers (R)	34	8	8	18	36	60	−24	32	0.94	Relegation to EFL League Two
22	Southend United (R)	35	4	7	24	39	85	−46	19	0.54	Relegation to EFL League Two
23	Bolton Wanderers (R)	34	5	11	18	27	66	−39	14 (Note: Bolton Wanderers deducted 12 points for entering administration.)	0.41	Relegation to EFL League Two
24	Bury	0	0	0	0	0	0	0	−12 (Note: Bury deducted 12 points for entering into an insolvency event, before later being expelled from the EFL on 27 August 2019. At the time of their expulsion, they had played no matches.)	—	Club expelled

Source: EFL Official Website
Rules for classification: 1) Points per game; 2) Goal difference; 3) Number of goals scored; 4) Head-to-head results; 5) Wins; 6) Away goals; 7) Penalty points (sec 9.5); 8) 12-point sending-off offences
(R) Relegated

==== Results summary ====
Overall								Home						Away					
Pld	W	D	L	GF	GA	GD	Pts	W	D	L	GF	GA	GD	W	D	L	GF	GA	GD
34	5	11	18	27	66	−39	14	4	8	5	17	23	−6	1	3	13	10	43	−33

Last updated: 10 March 2020.
Source: BBC

==== Results by matchday ====
Matchday	1	2	3	4	5	6	7	8	9	10	11	12	13	14	15	16	17	18	19	20	21	22	23	24	25	26	27	28	29	30	31	32	33	34	35
Ground	A	H	A	H	A	A	H	H	A	H	H	A	H	H	A	H	A	H	A	H	H	A	A	H	H	H	A	A	H	A	A	H	A	A	
Result	L	D	L	L	L	L	D	D	L	D	L	W	W	W	L	D	L	W	D	D	L	L	L	L	D	W	L	L	L	L	L	D	D	D	
Position	24	23	23	23	23	23	23	23	23	23	23	23	23	23	23	23	23	23	23	23	23	23	23	23	23	23	23	23	23	23	23	23	23	23	23

Updated to match(es) played on 10 March 2020. Source: 11v11 for league tables and fixtures
A = Away; H = Home; W = Win; D = Draw; L = Loss

==== Matches ====
On 20 June 2019, the League One fixtures for the forthcoming season were announced. Bolton begin their league campaign at Wycombe Wanderers, the first time the clubs have ever met in the league, on 3 August and were due to finish it away at Oxford United on 3 May. However this fixture, like all fixtures beginning with the home fixture against Peterborough United on 14 March, was postponed due to the COVID-19 pandemic.

3 August 2019 1	Wycombe Wanderers	2–0	Bolton Wanderers	High Wycombe
15:00 BST	Smyth 56'; Onyedinma 81'	Report		Stadium: Adams Park; Attendance: 6,454; Referee: Tom Nield

10 August 2019 2	Bolton Wanderers	0–0	Coventry City	Bolton
15:00 BST	Brown (yellow card) 18'; Weir (yellow card) 58'; Darcy (yellow card) 82'; Politic (yellow card) 86'	Report	Dabo (yellow card) 30'	Stadium: University of Bolton Stadium; Attendance: 8,901; Referee: James Adcock

17 August 2019 3	Tranmere Rovers	5–0	Bolton Wanderers	Birkenhead
15:00 BST	Ferrier (yellow card) 28' (goal) 40', 46'; Banks 38'; Jennings 63'; Ray (yellow card) 72'; Payne 75'; Mullin (yellow card) 80'	Report	Brockbank (yellow card) 36'; Zouma (yellow card) 67'	Stadium: Prenton Park; Attendance: 8,568; Referee: Charles Breakspear

20 August 2019	Bolton Wanderers	Fixture not fulfilled	Doncaster Rovers	Bolton
20:00 BST				Stadium: University of Bolton Stadium
Note: The match was suspended by Bolton without informing the Football League or Doncaster on 19 August 2019 due to concerns over welfare to their playing staff.

24 August 2019 4	Bolton Wanderers	0–5	Ipswich Town	Bolton
15:00 BST	Brockbank (yellow card) 19'	Report	Norwood 19' (pen.), 72'; Edwards 50' (yellow card) 69'; Jackson 60', 64'	Stadium: University of Bolton Stadium; Attendance: 5,454; Referee: Kevin Johnson

31 August 2019 5	Gillingham	5–0	Bolton Wanderers	Gillingham
15:00 BST	Ogilvie 27'; Lee 39', 57'; Hanlan 54'; Boon 76' (o.g.)	Report	Lowe (yellow card) 21'	Stadium: Priestfield Stadium; Attendance: 5,065; Referee: Robert Lewis

14 September 2019 6	Rotherham United	6–1	Bolton Wanderers	Rotherham
15:00 BST	Wiles 14'; Ladapo 28', 53'; Lindsay (yellow card) 37'; Morris 40', 55'; Hastie 65'; Crooks (yellow card) 77'	Report	Verlinden 4'	Stadium: New York Stadium; Attendance: 10,088; Referee: Sebastian Stockbridge

17 September 2019 7	Bolton Wanderers	0–0	Oxford United	Bolton
20:00 BST	Hobbs (yellow card) 55'; Politic (yellow card) 64'	Report		Stadium: University of Bolton Stadium; Attendance: 6,786; Referee: Paul Marsden

21 September 2019 8	Bolton Wanderers	1–1	Sunderland	Bolton
20:00 BST	Hobbs 50'; Chicksen (yellow card) 56'; Buckley (yellow card) 80'	Report	Hume (yellow card) 16'; McGeady (yellow card) 23' (goal) 90+2' (pen.); Power (yellow card) 86'; Flanagan (yellow card) 90+3'	Stadium: University of Bolton Stadium; Attendance: 12,026; Referee: Ollie Yates

28 September 2019 9	Portsmouth	1–0	Bolton Wanderers	Milton
15:00 BST	Curtis (yellow card) 32'; Close (yellow card) 58'; Pitman 66'	Report	Hobbs (yellow card) 45+1'; Lowe (yellow card) 50'	Stadium: Fratton Park; Attendance: 18,382; Referee: Darren Drysdale

7 October 2019 10	Bolton Wanderers	0–0	Blackpool	Bolton
20:00 BST	Verlinden (yellow card) 44'	Report	Heneghan (yellow card) 44'	Stadium: University of Bolton Stadium; Attendance: 14,003; Referee: John Busby

12 October 2019	Burton Albion	P–P	Bolton Wanderers	Burton upon Trent
15:00 BST				Stadium: Pirelli Stadium
Note: The match was postponed on 1 October 2019 by Burton, due to international call-ups.

19 October 2019 11	Bolton Wanderers	1–3	Rochdale	Bolton
15:00 BST	Lowe (yellow card) 14'; Verlinden 56'; Zouma (yellow card) 89'	Report	Camps 65' (yellow card) 81'; Rathbone 70' (yellow card) 74'; Morley (yellow card) 80'; Tavares 84'	Stadium: University of Bolton Stadium; Attendance: 13,828; Referee: Antony Coggins

22 October 2019 12	Bristol Rovers	0–2	Bolton Wanderers	Bristol
19:45 BST	Nichols (yellow card) 51'; Ogogo (yellow card) 53'	Report	L. Murphy 15' (yellow card) 61'; D. Murphy 68'	Stadium: Memorial Stadium; Attendance: 7,244; Referee: Trevor Kettle

26 October 2019	Lincoln City	P–P	Bolton Wanderers	Lincoln
15:00 BST		Report		Stadium: Sincil Bank
Note: Fixture was postponed due to a waterlogged pitch.

2 November 2019 13	Bolton Wanderers	2–1	Fleetwood Town	Bolton
15:00 GMT	Wright (yellow card) 4'; L. Murphy (yellow card) 11'; O'Grady 28'; D. Murphy 33'	Report	Dempsey (yellow card) 26'; Coyle (yellow card) 30'; Madden (yellow card) 49'; Morris 85'	Stadium: University of Bolton Stadium; Attendance: 12,756; Referee: Scott Oldham

16 November 2019 14	Bolton Wanderers	1–0	Milton Keynes Dons	Bolton
15:00 GMT	Verlinden (yellow card) 67'; Emmanuel (yellow card) 83'; Murphy 90+3'	Report	Williams (red card) 66'; Bowery (yellow card) 90+2'	Stadium: University of Bolton Stadium; Attendance: 11,819; Referee: Andy Madley

23 November 2019 15	Accrington Stanley	7–1	Bolton Wanderers	Accrington
15:00 GMT	Bishop 15' (pen.), 27'; McConville 33', 53'; Conneely (yellow card) 45+3'; Charles 75'; Zanzala 80', 90+1'	Report	Murphy 5'; Earl (red card) 14'; O'Grady (yellow card) 29'	Stadium: Wham Stadium; Attendance: 5,034; Referee: Anthony Backhouse

7 December 2019 16	Bolton Wanderers	2–2	AFC Wimbledon	Bolton
15:00 GMT	Murphy 56'; Dodoo 90+5'	Report	Forss 41', 81'; Sanders (yellow card) 62'	Stadium: University of Bolton Stadium; Attendance: 11,501; Referee: Marc Edwards

14 December 2019 17	Peterborough United	1–0	Bolton Wanderers	Peterborough
15:00 GMT	Toney 23'; Eisa (yellow card) 39'	Report	Murphy (yellow card) 15'; Bridcutt (yellow card) 88'	Stadium: London Road Stadium; Attendance: 6,965; Referee: Peter Wright

21 December 2019 18	Bolton Wanderers	3–2	Southend United	Bolton
15:00 GMT	Dodoo 36'; L. Murphy 45+2'; D. Murphy 64'; Earl (yellow card) 66'; Wright (yellow card) 71'	Report	Lennon 10'; Dieng 81'	Stadium: University of Bolton Stadium; Attendance: 12,055; Referee: Ben Toner

26 December 2019 19	Sunderland	0–0	Bolton Wanderers	Sunderland
15:00 GMT	Flanagan (yellow card) 44'; Hume (yellow card) 89'	Report	Emmanuel (yellow card) 19'; Lowe (yellow card) 21'; Darcy (yellow card) 64'; Bridcutt (yellow card) 81'	Stadium: Stadium of Light; Attendance: 33,821; Referee: Ross Joyce

29 December 2019 20	Bolton Wanderers	1–1	Shrewsbury Town	Bolton
15:00 GMT	Verlinden 34'; Lowe (red card) 58'	Report	Udoh 53'	Stadium: University of Bolton Stadium; Attendance: 13,788; Referee: Michael Salisbury

1 January 2020 21	Bolton Wanderers	3–4	Burton Albion	Bolton
15:00 GMT	Dodoo 5'; D. Murphy 11'; L. Murphy (yellow card) 29' (yellow-red card) 49'; Buckley (yellow card) 75'; Politic 84'	Report	Templeton 13'; Akins 26', 45+1'; Fraser (yellow card) 70'; Boyce 81'	Stadium: University of Bolton Stadium; Attendance: 11,918; Referee: Scott Oldham

4 January 2020	Blackpool	P–P	Bolton Wanderers	Blackpool
15:00 GMT				Stadium: Bloomfield Road
Note: This match was postponed on 2 December due to Blackpool's progression in the FA Cup.

11 January 2020 22	Rochdale	2–0	Bolton Wanderers	Spotland
15:00 GMT	Matheson 44'; O'Connell (yellow card) 54'; Ryan 80'	Report	Hamilton (yellow card) 85'	Stadium: Spotland Stadium; Attendance: 5,560; Referee: Leigh Doughty

14 January 2020 23	Lincoln City	5–1	Bolton Wanderers	Lincoln
19:45 GMT	Anderson 7'; Walker 61'; Coventry (yellow card) 73'; Morrell 85'; Akinde 86', 90'	Report	Darcy 47' (yellow card) 80'	Stadium: Sincil Bank; Attendance: 8,882; Referee: Neil Hair

18 January 2020 24	Bolton Wanderers	0–1	Portsmouth	Bolton
15:00 GMT	Edwards (yellow card) 24'; Dodoo (yellow card) 30'	Report	Raggett (yellow card) 27'; Burgess 42'; Harrison (yellow card) 45+1'	Stadium: University of Bolton Stadium; Attendance: 13,407; Referee: Tom Nield

25 January 2020	Shrewsbury Town	P–P	Bolton Wanderers	Shrewsbury
15:00 BST				Stadium: New Meadow
Note: The match was postponed on 15 January 2020 due to Shrewsbury Town's progression in the FA Cup

28 January 2020 25	Bolton Wanderers	1–1	Bristol Rovers	Bolton
20:00 GMT	Darcy (yellow card) 24'; Murphy 82'	Report	Upson (yellow card) 31'; Clarke-Harris 63'; Leahy (yellow card) 84'	Stadium: University of Bolton Stadium; Attendance: 10,657; Referee: Andy Haines

1 February 2020 26	Bolton Wanderers	2–0	Tranmere Rovers	Bolton
15:00 GMT	Politic 2'; O'Grady 64'; Bryan (yellow card) 69'	Report		Stadium: University of Bolton Stadium; Attendance: 13,044; Referee: Scott Oldham

8 February 2020 27	Coventry City	2–1	Bolton Wanderers	Birmingham
15:00 BST	Bakayoko 3' (yellow card) 69'; Biamou 90'	Report	Politic 77'	Stadium: St Andrew's; Attendance: 6,623; Referee: Ross Joyce

11 February 2020 28	Doncaster Rovers	2–1	Bolton Wanderers	Doncaster
19:45 BST	Ennis (yellow card) 37' (goal) 48'; Okenabirhie 40'; Halliday (yellow card) 90+4'	Report	Dodoo 57'	Stadium: Keepmoat Stadium; Attendance: 7,097; Referee: James Oldham

15 February 2020 29	Bolton Wanderers	0–2	Wycombe Wanderers	Bolton
15:00 GMT	Emmanuel (yellow card) 40'; Nsiala (yellow card) 59'; Matthews (yellow card) 61'; Fleming (yellow card) 63'	Report	Nsiala 44' (o.g.); Jacobson 62' (pen.); Allsop (yellow card) 77'; Gape (yellow card) 86'	Stadium: University of Bolton Stadium; Attendance: 11,737; Referee: Graham Salisbury

22 February 2020 30	Milton Keynes Dons	1–0	Bolton Wanderers	Milton Keynes
15:00 BST	Healey 68'; Morris (yellow card) 82'	Report	Politic (yellow card) 19'; Nsiala (yellow card) 71'	Stadium: Stadium MK; Attendance: 8,539; Referee: Ollie Yates

25 February 2020 31	Blackpool	2–1	Bolton Wanderers	Blackpool
19:45 GMT	Ronan 13'; Husband (yellow card) 74'; Dewsbury-Hall 90'	Report	Hamilton (yellow card) 32'; Murphy (yellow card) 66'; Bryan 88'	Stadium: Bloomfield Road; Attendance: 8,116; Referee: Paul Marsden

29 February 2020 32	Bolton Wanderers	0–0	Accrington Stanley	Bolton
15:00 GMT	Bryan (yellow card) 73'	Report		Stadium: University of Bolton Stadium; Attendance: 12,011; Referee: Josh Smith

7 March 2020 33	AFC Wimbledon	0–0	Bolton Wanderers	Kingston upon Thames
15:00 GMT		Report		Stadium: Kingsmeadow; Attendance: 4,804; Referee: Marc Edwards

10 March 2020 34	Burton Albion	2–2	Bolton Wanderers	Burton upon Trent
19:45 GMT	Murphy 28', 65'; Sbarra (yellow card) 90'	Report	Delaney 20'; Nsiala (yellow card) 34'; Hamilton 38'	Stadium: Pirelli Stadium; Attendance: 2,034; Referee: Thomas Bramall

14 March 2020	Bolton Wanderers	P–P	Peterborough United	Bolton
15:00 GMT				Stadium: University of Bolton Stadium
Note: All matches in the United Kingdom until 4 April postponed because of the COVID-19 pandemic On March 19, this was extended to 30 April On April 3, all matches were postponed "indefinitely".

21 March 2020	Southend United	P–P	Bolton Wanderers	Southend-on-Sea
15:00 BST				Stadium: Roots Hall
Note: All matches in the United Kingdom until 4 April postponed because of the COVID-19 pandemic On March 19, this was extended to 30 April On April 3, all matches were postponed "indefinitely".

24 March 2020	Bolton Wanderers	P–P	Doncaster Rovers	Bolton
20:00 BST				Stadium: University of Bolton Stadium
Note: All matches in the United Kingdom until 4 April postponed because of the COVID-19 pandemic On March 19, this was extended to 30 April On April 3, all matches were postponed "indefinitely".

28 March 2020	Fleetwood Town	P–P	Bolton Wanderers	Fleetwood
15:00 BST				Stadium: Highbury Stadium
Note: All matches in the United Kingdom until 4 April postponed because of the COVID-19 pandemic On March 19, this was extended to 30 April On April 3, all matches were postponed "indefinitely".

4 April 2020	Bolton Wanderers	P–P	Lincoln City	Bolton
15:00 BST				Stadium: University of Bolton Stadium
Note: All matches in the United Kingdom until 30 April postponed because of the COVID-19 pandemic On April 3, all matches were postponed "indefinitely".

10 April 2020	Ipswich Town	P–P	Bolton Wanderers	Ipswich
19:45 BST				Stadium: Portman Road
Note: All matches in the United Kingdom until 30 April postponed because of the COVID-19 pandemic On April 3, all matches were postponed "indefinitely".

14 April 2020	Bolton Wanderers	P–P	Gillingham	Bolton
20:00 BST				Stadium: University of Bolton Stadium
Note: All matches in the United Kingdom until 30 April postponed because of the COVID-19 pandemic

21 April 2020	Shrewsbury Town	P–P	Bolton Wanderers	Shrewsbury
19:45 BST				Stadium: Montgomery Waters Meadow
Note: All matches in the United Kingdom until 30 April postponed because of the COVID-19 pandemic On April 3, all matches were postponed "indefinitely".

25 April 2020	Bolton Wanderers	P–P	Rotherham United	Bolton
20:00 BST				Stadium: University of Bolton Stadium
Note: All matches in the United Kingdom until 30 April postponed because of the COVID-19 pandemic On April 3, all matches were postponed "indefinitely".

3 May 2020	Oxford United	P–P	Bolton Wanderers	Oxford
15:00 BST				Stadium: Kassam Stadium
Note: On April 3, all matches were postponed "indefinitely".

=== FA Cup ===
The first round draw was made on 21 October 2019 and Bolton were given a home tie against League Two side Plymouth Argyle. A first half goal from Callum McFadzean was enough to see the away side through and knock Bolton out of the competition at the first round stage for the first time in 30 years. It was also the first time in the club's existence that they had been knocked out of both senior domestic cup competitions at the first round stage.

9 November 2019 First round	Bolton Wanderers	0–1	Plymouth Argyle	Bolton
15:00 GMT	L. Murphy (yellow card) 31'	Report	McFadzean 11'	Stadium: University of Bolton Stadium; Attendance: 6,992; Referee: Robert Lewis

=== EFL Cup ===
On 20 June 2019, the draw for the first round was made in London and Bolton were drawn away at North-West rivals Rochdale. The subsequent 5–2 defeat was the club's second first round defeat in a row and their fourth in five years.

13 August 2019 First round	Rochdale	5–2	Bolton Wanderers	Spotland
19:45	Henderson 27' (pen.); Pyke 64'; Camps 66', 73'; Rathbone 86'	Report	Darcy 14'; Politic 48'	Stadium: Spotland Stadium; Attendance: 3,362; Referee: Andy Haines

=== EFL Trophy ===
On 9 July 2019, the pre-determined group stage draw was announced with invited clubs to be drawn on 12 July 2019. The draw for the second round was made on 16 November 2019 live on Sky Sports.

Pos	Div	Team	Pld	W	PW	PL	L	GF	GA	GD	Pts	Qualification
1	ACA	Manchester City U21	3	2	0	0	1	5	4	+1	6	Advance to Round 2
2	L1	Bolton Wanderers	3	1	0	2	0	5	3	+2	5	Advance to Round 2
3	L1	Rochdale	3	1	1	0	1	3	4	−1	5	
4	L2	Bradford City	3	0	1	0	2	3	5	−2	2	

Source: EFL.com

3 September 2019 Group Stage Game 1	Bolton Wanderers	1–1 (3–4 p)	Bradford City	Bolton
19:10 BST	Politic 8' (yellow card) 40'; Brockbank (yellow card) 43'; Brown (yellow card) 60'; Fitzmartin (yellow card) 86'	Report	O'Connor (yellow card) 26' (goal) 51'; Ismail (yellow card) 81'	Stadium: University of Bolton Stadium; Attendance: 9,062; Referee: Martin Coy
	Penalties
	Weir (penalty scored); Brockbank (penalty scored); Darcy (penalty scored); Boon (penalty missed); Senior (penalty missed)		Ismail (penalty scored); Gibson (penalty scored); Richards-Everton (penalty scored); Wood (penalty scored); O'Connor (penalty missed)

1 October 2019 Group Stage Game 2	Rochdale	1–1 (5–3 p)	Bolton Wanderers	Spotland
19:45 BST	Wilbraham (yellow card) 25' (goal) 57'	Report	Emmanuel (yellow card) 22'; Crawford 45+2'	Stadium: Spotland Stadium; Attendance: 1,412; Referee: Leigh Doughty
	Penalties
	Andrew (penalty scored); Gillam (penalty scored); Morley (penalty scored); Norrington-Davies (penalty scored); Keohane (penalty scored)		Crawford (penalty scored); Politic (penalty scored); Verlinden (penalty scored); Chicksen (penalty missed)

29 October 2019 Group Stage Game 3	Bolton Wanderers	3–1	Manchester City U21	Bolton
19:00 GMT	Crawford 4'; O'Grady 66', 89'	Report	Zouma 13' (o.g.)	Stadium: University of Bolton Stadium; Attendance: 2,616; Referee: Peter Wright

10 December 2019 Second round	Accrington Stanley	2–0	Bolton Wanderers	Accrington
19:45 GMT	Zanzala 10'; Bishop 85'	Report	Graham (yellow card) 36'	Stadium: Wham Stadium; Attendance: 930; Referee: Sebastian Stockbridge

== Squad ==
Note: Flags indicate national team as defined under FIFA eligibility rules; some limited exceptions apply. Players may hold more than one non-FIFA nationality.

No.	Pos.	Nation	Player
2	DF	ENG	Josh Emmanuel
3	DF	ENG	Joe Bunney
4	MF	ENG	Jason Lowe (captain)
5	DF	ENG	Jack Hobbs
6	DF	IRL	Ryan Delaney
7	MF	ENG	Will Buckley
8	MF	ENG	Luke Murphy
9	FW	IRL	Daryl Murphy
10	FW	ENG	Chris O'Grady
11	MF	SCO	Ali Crawford
12	DF	ENG	Brandon Fleming (on loan from Hull City)
14	MF	ENG	Jacob Mellis
16	MF	CYP	Anthony Georgiou (on loan from Tottenham Hotspur)
17	DF	ENG	Kean Bryan (on loan from Sheffield United)
18	MF	SCO	Ethan Hamilton (on loan from Manchester United)
19	FW	ENG	Muhammadu Faal
20	GK	ENG	Remi Matthews
21	DF	ENG	Harry Brockbank
22	MF	ROU	Dennis Politic
23	FW	GHA	Joe Dodoo

No.	Pos.	Nation	Player
26	DF	ENG	Liam Edwards
27	MF	ENG	Ronan Darcy
28	DF	COD	Aristote Nsiala (on loan from Ipswich Town)
30	DF	FRA	Yoan Zouma
33	FW	ENG	Eddie Brown
34	DF	ENG	Adam Senior
35	MF	ENG	Sonny Graham
36	MF	WAL	Callum King-Harmes
37	MF	ENG	Finlay Hurford-Lockett
38	DF	ENG	Joe White
39	FW	ENG	De'Marlio Brown-Sterling
40	MF	ENG	Myles Edmondson
41	DF	ENG	D'Neal Richards
42	FW	ENG	Kwame Osigwe
43	GK	ENG	Matthew Alexander
44	MF	ENG	Regan Riley
45	DF	ENG	Nathan Whalley
46	GK	ENG	Luke Hutchinson
47	MF	ENG	Jay Fitzmartin

=== Out on loan ===
Note: Flags indicate national team as defined under FIFA eligibility rules; some limited exceptions apply. Players may hold more than one non-FIFA nationality.

No.	Pos.	Nation	Player
24	FW	ENG	Connor Hall (at Chorley F.C. until June 2020)
29	MF	ENG	George Thomason (on loan at Bamber Bridge until June 2020)

=== Statistics ===
As of match played 10 March 2020

No.	Pos	Nat	Player	Total		League One		FA Cup		League Cup		League Trophy	
No.	Pos	Nat	Player	Apps	Goals	Apps	Goals	Apps	Goals	Apps	Goals	Apps	Goals
Goalkeepers
20	GK	(England) ENG	Remi Matthews	38	0	33+0	0	1+0	0	1+0	0	3+0	0
43	GK	(England) ENG	Matthew Alexander	2	0	1+0	0	0+0	0	0+0	0	1+0	0
Defenders
2	DF	(England) ENG	Josh Emmanuel	31	0	25+2	0	1+0	0	0+0	0	3+0	0
3	DF	(England) ENG	Joe Bunney	2	0	1+1	0	0+0	0	0+0	0	0+0	0
5	DF	(England) ENG	Jack Hobbs	12	1	11+0	1	0+0	0	0+0	0	0+1	0
6	DF	(Republic of Ireland) IRL	Ryan Delaney	4	1	2+2	1	0+0	0	0+0	0	0+0	0
12	DF	(England) ENG	Brandon Fleming	10	0	10+0	0	0+0	0	0+0	0	0+0	0
17	DF	(England) ENG	Kean Bryan	6	1	6+0	1	0+0	0	0+0	0	0+0	0
21	DF	(England) ENG	Harry Brockbank	8	0	5+1	0	0+0	0	1+0	0	1+0	0
26	DF	(England) ENG	Liam Edwards	7	0	6+0	0	0+0	0	1+0	0	0+0	0
28	DF	(Democratic Republic of the Congo) COD	Aristote Nsiala	12	0	12+0	0	0+0	0	0+0	0	0+0	0
30	DF	(France) FRA	Yoan Zouma	22	0	13+3	0	1+0	0	1+0	0	4+0	0
34	DF	(England) ENG	Adam Senior	4	0	1+1	0	0+0	0	0+0	0	2+0	0
38	DF	(England) ENG	Joe White	5	0	3+1	0	0+0	0	0+0	0	0+1	0
Midfielders
4	MF	(England) ENG	Jason Lowe	34	0	28+1	0	1+0	0	1+0	0	3+0	0
7	MF	(England) ENG	Will Buckley	6	0	3+2	0	0+0	0	0+0	0	1+0	0
8	MF	(England) ENG	Luke Murphy	32	2	26+3	2	1+0	0	1+0	0	1+0	0
11	MF	(Scotland) SCO	Ali Crawford	14	2	12+0	0	0+0	0	0+0	0	2+0	2
14	MF	(England) ENG	Jacob Mellis	6	0	1+5	0	0+0	0	0+0	0	0+0	0
16	MF	(Cyprus) CYP	Anthony Georgiou	2	0	0+2	0	0+0	0	0+0	0	0+0	0
18	MF	(Scotland) SCO	Ethan Hamilton	12	1	12+0	1	0+0	0	0+0	0	0+0	0
22	MF	(Romania) ROU	Dennis Politic	30	5	19+5	3	0+1	0	1+0	1	3+1	1
27	MF	(England) ENG	Ronan Darcy	22	2	14+5	1	0+0	0	1+0	1	2+0	0
35	MF	(England) ENG	Sonny Graham	18	0	6+7	0	1+0	0	0+0	0	3+1	0
36	MF	(Wales) WAL	Callum King-Harmes	7	0	3+2	0	0+0	0	1+0	0	1+0	0
37	MF	(England) ENG	Finlay Hurford-Lockett	3	0	0+2	0	0+0	0	0+1	0	0+0	0
44	MF	(England) ENG	Regan Riley	1	0	0+1	0	0+0	0	0+0	0	0+0	0
47	MF	(England) ENG	Jay Fitzmartin	1	0	0+0	0	0+0	0	0+0	0	0+1	0
Forwards
9	FW	(Republic of Ireland) IRL	Daryl Murphy	26	8	23+1	8	1+0	0	0+0	0	1+0	0
10	FW	(England) ENG	Chris O'Grady	23	4	10+10	2	1+0	0	0+0	0	2+0	2
19	FW	(England) ENG	Muhammadu Faal	2	0	0+2	0	0+0	0	0+0	0	0+0	0
23	FW	(Ghana) GHA	Joe Dodoo	26	4	15+8	4	1+0	0	0+0	0	1+1	0
33	FW	(England) ENG	Eddie Brown	7	0	4+1	0	0+0	0	1+0	0	1+0	0
39	FW	(England) ENG	De'Marlio Brown-Sterling	4	0	1+1	0	0+0	0	0+1	0	0+1	0
Player(s) out on loan
24	FW	(England) ENG	Connor Hall	2	0	0+1	0	0+1	0	0+0	0	0+0	0
Player(s) who left the club
6	DF	(England) ENG	Jake Wright	12	0	11+0	0	1+0	0	0+0	0	0+0	0
10	MF	(Turkey) TUR	Erhun Oztumer	1	0	1+0	0	0+0	0	0+0	0	0+0	0
12	DF	(Zimbabwe) ZIM	Adam Chicksen	20	0	14+2	0	1+0	0	0+0	0	2+1	0
14	MF	(England) ENG	James Weir	12	0	7+1	0	0+0	0	1+0	0	3+0	0
17	MF	(Belgium) BEL	Thibaud Verlinden	17	3	12+3	3	0+0	0	0+0	0	1+1	0
28	MF	(Scotland) SCO	Liam Bridcutt	12	0	11+0	0	0+0	0	0+0	0	1+0	0
31	DF	(England) ENG	Jordan Boon	5	0	1+2	0	0+0	0	0+1	0	1+0	0
32	DF	(England) ENG	Josh Earl	11	0	9+0	0	0+1	0	0+0	0	1+0	0

=== Goals record ===
As of match played 10 March 2020

Rank	No.	Nat.	Po.	Name	League One	FA Cup	League Cup	League Trophy	Total
1	9	(Republic of Ireland)	CF	Daryl Murphy	8	0	0	0	8
2	22	(Romania)	RW	Dennis Politic	3	0	1	1	5
3	10	(England)	CF	Chris O'Grady	2	0	0	2	4
3	23	(Ghana)	CF	Joe Dodoo	4	0	0	0	4
5	-	(Belgium)	LW	Thibaud Verlinden	3	0	0	0	3
6	8	(England)	CM	Luke Murphy	2	0	0	0	2
6	11	(Scotland)	CAM	Ali Crawford	0	0	0	2	2
6	27	(England)	CAM	Ronan Darcy	1	0	1	0	2
9	5	(England)	CB	Jack Hobbs	1	0	0	0	1
9	6	(Republic of Ireland)	CB	Ryan Delaney	1	0	0	0	1
9	17	(England)	CB	Kean Bryan	1	0	0	0	1
9	18	(Scotland)	CM	Ethan Hamilton	1	0	0	0	1
Total					27	0	2	5	34

=== Disciplinary record ===
As of match played 10 March 2020

Rank	No.	Nat.	Po.	Name	League One			FA Cup			League Cup			EFL Trophy			Total		
Rank	No.	Nat.	Po.	Name	Yellow card	(yellow card) (yellow-red card)	Red card	Yellow card	(yellow card) (yellow-red card)	Red card	Yellow card	(yellow card) (yellow-red card)	Red card	Yellow card	(yellow card) (yellow-red card)	Red card	Yellow card	(yellow card) (yellow-red card)	Red card
1	8	(England)	CM	Luke Murphy	4	1	0	1	0	0	0	0	0	0	0	0	5	1	0
2	4	(England)	CM	Jason Lowe	4	0	1	0	0	0	0	0	0	0	0	0	4	0	1
3	2	(England)	RB	Josh Emmanuel	3	0	0	0	0	0	0	0	0	1	0	0	4	0	0
3	22	(Romania)	RW	Dennis Politic	3	0	0	0	0	0	0	0	0	1	0	0	4	0	0
3	27	(England)	CAM	Ronan Darcy	4	0	0	0	0	0	0	0	0	0	0	0	4	0	0
3	-	(England)	CB	Josh Earl	1	0	1	0	0	0	0	0	0	0	0	0	1	0	1
7	21	(England)	RB	Harry Brockbank	2	0	0	0	0	0	0	0	0	1	0	0	3	0	0
7	28	(Democratic Republic of the Congo)	CB	Aristote Nsiala	3	0	0	0	0	0	0	0	0	0	0	0	3	0	0
9	5	(England)	CB	Jack Hobbs	2	0	0	0	0	0	0	0	0	0	0	0	2	0	0
9	6	(England)	CB	Jake Wright	2	0	0	0	0	0	0	0	0	0	0	0	2	0	0
9	7	(England)	CAM	Will Buckley	2	0	0	0	0	0	0	0	0	0	0	0	2	0	0
9	17	(England)	CB	Kean Bryan	2	0	0	0	0	0	0	0	0	0	0	0	2	0	0
9	18	(Scotland)	CM	Ethan Hamilton	2	0	0	0	0	0	0	0	0	0	0	0	2	0	0
9	30	(France)	CB	Yoan Zouma	2	0	0	0	0	0	0	0	0	0	0	0	2	0	0
9	33	(England)	CF	Eddie Brown	1	0	0	0	0	0	0	0	0	1	0	0	2	0	0
9	-	(Belgium)	LW	Thibaud Verlinden	2	0	0	0	0	0	0	0	0	0	0	0	2	0	0
9	-	(Scotland)	DM	Liam Bridcutt	2	0	0	0	0	0	0	0	0	0	0	0	2	0	0
18	9	(England)	CF	Chris O'Grady	1	0	0	0	0	0	0	0	0	0	0	0	1	0	0
18	12	(England)	LB	Brandon Fleming	1	0	0	0	0	0	0	0	0	0	0	0	1	0	0
18	20	(England)	GK	Remi Matthews	1	0	0	0	0	0	0	0	0	0	0	0	1	0	0
18	23	(Ghana)	CF	Joe Dodoo	1	0	0	0	0	0	0	0	0	0	0	0	1	0	0
18	26	(England)	CB	Liam Edwards	1	0	0	0	0	0	0	0	0	0	0	0	1	0	0
18	35	(England)	CM	Sonny Graham	0	0	0	0	0	0	0	0	0	1	0	0	1	0	0
18	47	(England)	RW	Jay Fitzmartin	0	0	0	0	0	0	0	0	0	1	0	0	1	0	0
18	-	(Zimbabwe)	LB	Adam Chicksen	1	0	0	0	0	0	0	0	0	0	0	0	1	0	0
18	-	(England)	CM	James Weir	1	0	0	0	0	0	0	0	0	0	0	0	1	0	0
Total					48	1	2	1	0	0	0	0	0	6	0	0	55	1	2

== Transfers ==
=== Transfers in ===
Date	Position	Nationality	Name	From	Fee	Ref.
3 August 2019	CM	(England)	James Weir	(England) Hull City	Free transfer	
2 September 2019	LB	(England)	Joe Bunney	(England) Northampton Town	Free transfer	
2 September 2019	CM	(Scotland)	Ali Crawford	(England) Doncaster Rovers	Free transfer	
2 September 2019	RB	(England)	Josh Emmanuel	(England) Ipswich Town	Free transfer	
2 September 2019	CF	(Republic of Ireland)	Daryl Murphy	(England) Nottingham Forest	Free transfer	
2 September 2019	CF	(England)	Chris O'Grady	(England) Oldham Athletic	Free transfer	
14 September 2019	LB	(Zimbabwe)	Adam Chicksen	(England) Bradford City	Free transfer	
3 October 2019	CF	(Ghana)	Joe Dodoo	(Scotland) Rangers	Free transfer	
6 January 2020	CF	(England)	Muhammadu Faal	(England) Enfield Town	Free transfer	
6 January 2020	CM	(England)	George Thomason	(England) Longridge Town	Free transfer	
27 January 2020	AM	(England)	Will Buckley	Free agent	Free transfer	
31 January 2020	CB	(Republic of Ireland)	Ryan Delaney	(England) Rochdale	Free transfer	
31 January 2020	CM	(England)	Jacob Mellis	(England) Mansfield Town	Free transfer	

=== Loans in ===
Date from	Position	Nationality	Name	From	Date until	Ref.
3 August 2019	LB	(England)	Josh Earl	(England) Preston North End	5 January 2020	
2 September 2019	DM	(Scotland)	Liam Bridcutt	(England) Nottingham Forest	1 January 2020	
2 September 2019	LW	(Belgium)	Thibaud Verlinden	(England) Stoke City	1 January 2020	
2 September 2019	CB	(England)	Jake Wright	(England) Sheffield United	5 January 2020	
6 January 2020	CM	(Scotland)	Ethan Hamilton	(England) Manchester United	30 June 2020	
10 January 2020	CB	(Democratic Republic of the Congo)	Aristote Nsiala	(England) Ipswich Town	30 June 2020	
17 January 2020	LB	(England)	Brandon Fleming	(England) Hull City	30 June 2020	
30 January 2020	CB	(England)	Kean Bryan	(England) Sheffield United	30 June 2020	
31 January 2020	LW	(Cyprus)	Anthony Georgiou	(England) Tottenham Hotspur	30 June 2020	

=== Loans out ===
Date from	Position	Nationality	Name	To	Date until	Ref.
24 January 2020	CF	(England)	Connor Hall	(England) Chorley	30 June 2020	
31 January 2020	CB	(England)	Jordan Boon	(England) Atherton Collieries	11 March 2020	
31 January 2020	CM	(England)	George Thomason	(England) Bamber Bridge	30 June 2020	

=== Transfers out ===
Date	Position	Nationality	Name	To	Fee	Ref.
1 July 2019	RW	(England)	Sammy Ameobi	(England) Nottingham Forest	Free transfer	
1 July 2019	CB	(England)	Mark Beevers	(England) Peterborough United	Free transfer	
1 July 2019	DM	(Republic of Ireland)	Luca Connell	(Scotland) Celtic	£350,000	
1 July 2019	CF	(Jamaica)	Clayton Donaldson	(England) Bradford City	Free transfer	
1 July 2019	CM	(England)	Jack Earing	(England) FC Halifax Town	Free transfer	
1 July 2019	RB	(England)	Chiori Johnson	Free agent	Released	
1 July 2019	RB	(England)	Mark Little	(England) Bristol Rovers	Free transfer	
1 July 2019	RW	(England)	Craig Noone	(Australia) Melbourne City	Free transfer	
1 July 2019	CF	(England)	Daniel Ogwuru	(England) Manchester City	£100,000	
1 July 2019	CM	(England)	Gary O'Neil	Free agent	Released	
1 July 2019	CM	(England)	Joe Pritchard	(England) Accrington Stanley	Free transfer	
1 July 2019	LB	(England)	Andrew Taylor	Retired	—N/a	
1 July 2019	GK	(England)	Ben Williams	Free agent	Released	
1 July 2019	CB	(Republic of Ireland)	Marc Wilson	Free agent	Released	
9 July 2019	RB	(Poland)	Paweł Olkowski	(Turkey) Gazişehir Gaziantep	Free transfer	
15 July 2019	GK	(England)	Ben Amos	(England) Charlton Athletic	Free transfer	
17 July 2019	CM	(England)	Josh Vela	(Scotland) Hibernian	Free transfer	
29 July 2019	GK	(England)	Jake Turner	(England) Newcastle United	Free transfer	
1 August 2019	CB	(England)	David Wheater	(England) Oldham Athletic	Free transfer	
8 August 2019	CF	(Northern Ireland)	Josh Magennis	(England) Hull City	Nominal fee	
15 August 2019	AM	(England)	Erhun Oztumer	(England) Charlton Athletic	Free transfer	
23 August 2019	DM	(England)	Marcus Wood	(England) Bradford (Park Avenue)	Free transfer	
27 August 2019	RM	(Guyana)	Stephen Duke-McKenna	(England) Queens Park Rangers	Free transfer	
25 September 2019	LM	(England)	Lloyd Dyer	(England) Burton Albion	Free transfer	
7 November 2019	DF	(England)	William Hartshorne	(England) Glossop North End	Free transfer	
7 November 2019	MF	(England)	Luca Navarro	(England) Buxton	Free transfer	
27 December 2019	GK	(England)	Ben Alnwick	Free agent	Mutual consent	
10 January 2020	AM	(England)	Will Buckley	Free agent	Released	
13 January 2020	LB	(Zimbabwe)	Adam Chicksen	Free agent	Released	
31 January 2020	CM	(England)	James Weir	(Slovakia) FK Pohronie	Mutual consent	
11 March 2020	CB	(England)	Jordan Boon	(Sweden) IFK Östersund	Mutual consent	
