= Bright Amoateng =

English footballer

Personal information
- Full name: Bright Amoateng
- Date of birth: 22 November 2002 (age 23)
- Place of birth: England
- Position: Forward

Team information
- Current team: Nkoranza Warriors SC

Youth career
- –2019: Liverpool
- 2019: Bury
- 2020–2022: Bolton Wanderers

Senior career*
Years	Team	Apps	(Gls)
2020–2022	Bolton Wanderers	1	(0)
2023–	Nkoranza Warriors SC	12	(3)
- * Club domestic league appearances and goals as of 22 February 2023 (UTC)

Bright Amoateng is an English professional footballer who plays for Ghanaian team Nkoranza Warriors SC.

== Career ==
Amoateng began his career as an academy player for Liverpool. By 2019 he had moved to Bury's academy. Due to Bury's expulsion from the Football League on 27 August, he was one of 140 youth players that were released. He played for Bolton's U23 during March 2020 and was signed as a first year scholar on 4 September after a successful trial with the first team during pre-season for the 2020–21 season. He made his competitive debut on 12 September, coming on as a late substitute for Reiss Greenidge in a 0–1 home defeat against Forest Green Rovers in Bolton's first EFL League Two match of the 2020–21 season. He was released in January 2022.

== Career statistics ==
As of match played 12 September 2020

Appearances and goals by club, season, and competition
Club	Season	League			FA Cup		League Cup		Other		Total	
Club	Season	Division	Apps	Goals	Apps	Goals	Apps	Goals	Apps	Goals	Apps	Goals
Bolton Wanderers	2020–21	League Two	1	0	0	0	0	0	0	0	1	0
Bolton Wanderers	2021–22	League One	0	0	0	0	0	0	0	0	0	0
Bolton Wanderers	Total		1	0	0	0	0	0	0	0	1	0
