= De'Marlio Brown-Sterling =

English footballer

Personal information
- Full name: De'Marlio Shakie Brown-Sterling
- Date of birth: 12 September 2001 (age 25)
- Place of birth: Manchester, England
- Position: Striker

Youth career
- 2018–2020: Bolton Wanderers

Senior career*
Years	Team	Apps	(Gls)
2019–2020	Bolton Wanderers	5	(0)
2021–2022	Irlam		
- * Club domestic league appearances and goals as of 23:09, 6 December 2023 (UTC)

De'Marlio Shakie Brown-Sterling (born 12 September 2001) is an English professional footballer who plays for Irlam.

== Club career ==
=== Bolton Wanderers ===
Brown-Sterling made his professional debut for Bolton Wanderers on 13 August 2019 in a 5–2 away defeat to Rochdale in the EFL Cup.

Brown-Sterling made his home debut for Bolton on 24 August in a 5–0 defeat to Ipswich Town.

Brown-Sterling went on to feature in the EFL Trophy against Bradford City; the match ended in a 4–3 loss on penalties.

=== After Bolton ===
In October 2020 he had a trial with Sheffield Wednesday and played for their U23 team.

=== Irlam ===
In the 2021–22 season, Brown-Sterling joined Irlam as a free agent. At the end of the 2021–22 season, he was released by the club and became a free agent.

=== Retirement ===
After being a free agent for a year, Brown-Sterling retired at the end of the 2022–23 season.

== Career statistics ==
As of match played 3 September 2019

Appearances and goals by club, season and competition
Club	Season	League			FA Cup		League Cup		Other		Total	
Club	Season	Division	Apps	Goals	Apps	Goals	Apps	Goals	Apps	Goals	Apps	Goals
Bolton Wanderers	2019–20	League One	2	0	0	0	1	0	1 (Note: Appearance in EFL Trophy)	0	4	0
Career total			2	0	0	0	1	0	1	0	4	0
