= Eddie Brown (footballer, born 2000) =

English footballer

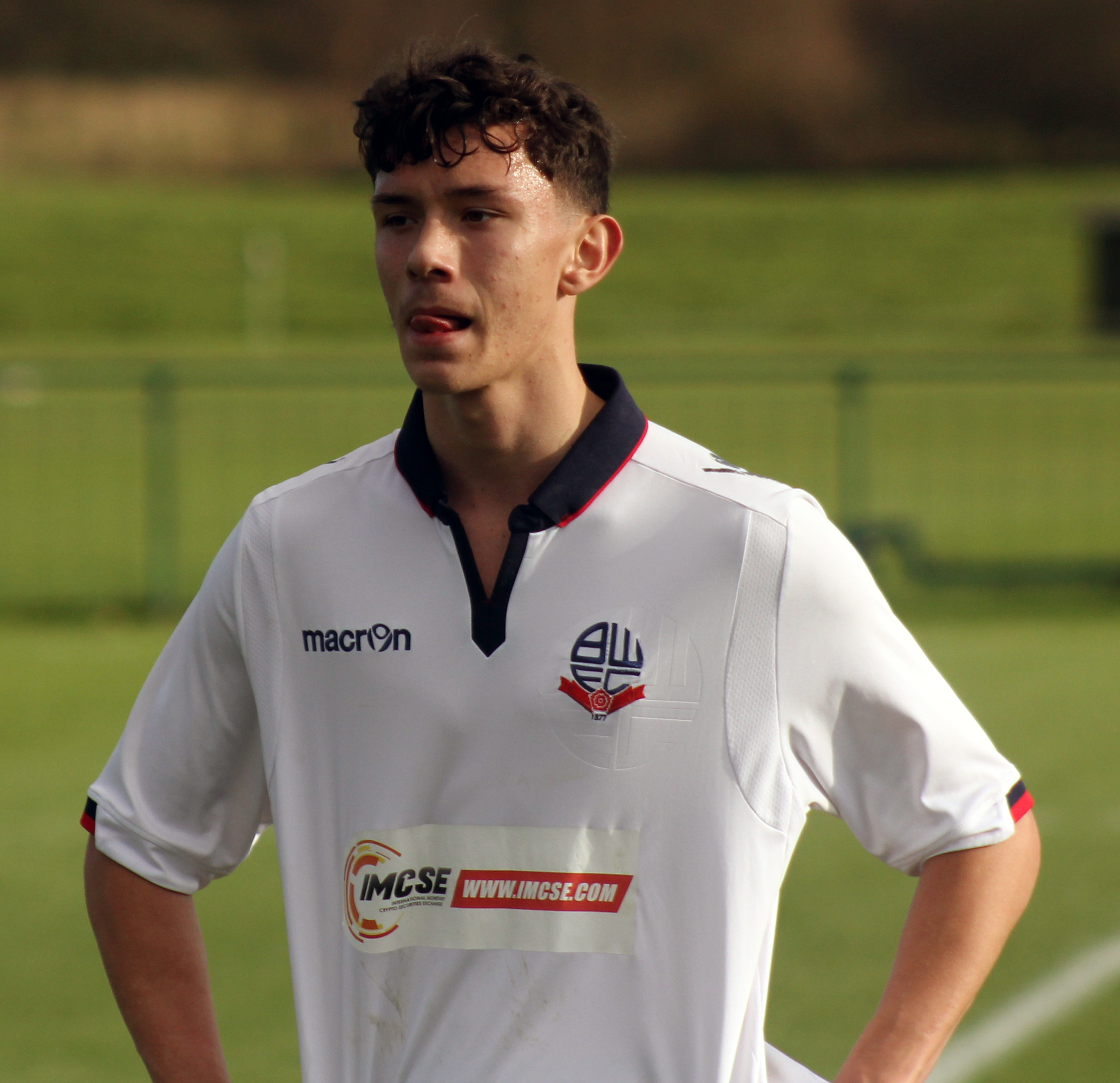
- Brown playing for Bolton Wanderers U18s in 2017

Personal information
- Full name: Edward James Brown
- Date of birth: 27 November 2000 (age 25)
- Place of birth: Manchester, England
- Position: Forward

Senior career*
Years	Team	Apps	(Gls)
2019–2020	Bolton Wanderers	5	(0)
2021–2022	Wythenshawe Amateurs	28	(17)
2022–2023	Hyde United	23	(3)
2023	Wythenshawe Amateurs (dual-reg)	?	(?)
- * Club domestic league appearances and goals as of 19:55, 13 August 2022 (UTC)

Edward James 'Eddie' Brown (born 27 November 2000) is an English professional footballer who played for Hyde United most recently.

== Career ==
Brown made his senior debut for Bolton in a 2–0 away defeat against Wycombe Wanderers.

== Career statistics ==
As of match played 3 September 2019.

Appearances and goals by club, season and competition
Club	Season	League			FA Cup		League Cup		Other		Total	
Club	Season	Division	Apps	Goals	Apps	Goals	Apps	Goals	Apps	Goals	Apps	Goals
Bolton Wanderers	2019–20	League One	5	0	0	0	1	0	1 (Note: Appearance(s) in the EFL Trophy.)	0	7	0
Career total			5	0	0	0	1	0	1	0	7	0
