= Sonny Graham =

English footballer

Personal information
- Full name: Sonny Graham
- Date of birth: 10 June 2002 (age 24)
- Place of birth: Morecambe, England
- Position: Midfielder

Youth career
- Bolton Wanderers

Senior career*
| Years | Team | Apps | (Gls) |
| 2019–2021 | Bolton Wanderers | 13 | (0) |
| 2021–2022 | Trimpell & Bare Rangers | 6 | (0) |
- * Club domestic league appearances and goals as of 05:31, 14 January 2022 (UTC)

Sonny Graham (born 10 June 2002) is an English professional footballer who plays as a midfielder.

== Career ==
On 10 August 2019, Graham made his Bolton Wanderers debut in a 0–0 draw at home to Coventry City, in which Bolton fielded their youngest ever team, due to financial difficulties. He signed his first professional contract with Bolton Wanderers on 15 May 2020, penning a one-year deal. On 19 May 2021 Bolton announced he would be released at the end of his contract.

After being released by Bolton he signed for Mid Lancashire Football League Division One side Trimpell & Bare Rangers.

== Career statistics ==
As of 14 January 2022

Appearances and goals by club, season and competition
| Club | Season | League | | | FA Cup | | League Cup | | Other | | Total | |
| Club | Season | Division | Apps | Goals | Apps | Goals | Apps | Goals | Apps | Goals | Apps | Goals |
|---|---|---|---|---|---|---|---|---|---|---|---|---|
| Bolton Wanderers | 2019–20 | League One | 13 | 0 | 1 | 0 | 0 | 0 | 4 (Note: Appearance(s) in the Football League Trophy.) | 0 | 18 | 0 |
| Bolton Wanderers | 2020–21 | League Two | 0 | 0 | 0 | 0 | 0 | 0 | 0 | 0 | 0 | 0 |
| Bolton Wanderers | Total | | 13 | 0 | 1 | 0 | 0 | 0 | 4 | 0 | 18 | 0 |
| Trimpell & Bare Rangers | 2021–22 | Mid Lancashire Football League Division One | 6 | 0 | 0 | 0 | – | | 0 | 0 | 6 | 0 |
| Career total | | | 19 | 0 | 1 | 0 | 0 | 0 | 4 | 0 | 24 | 0 |
