= Liam Edwards =

English footballer (born 1996)

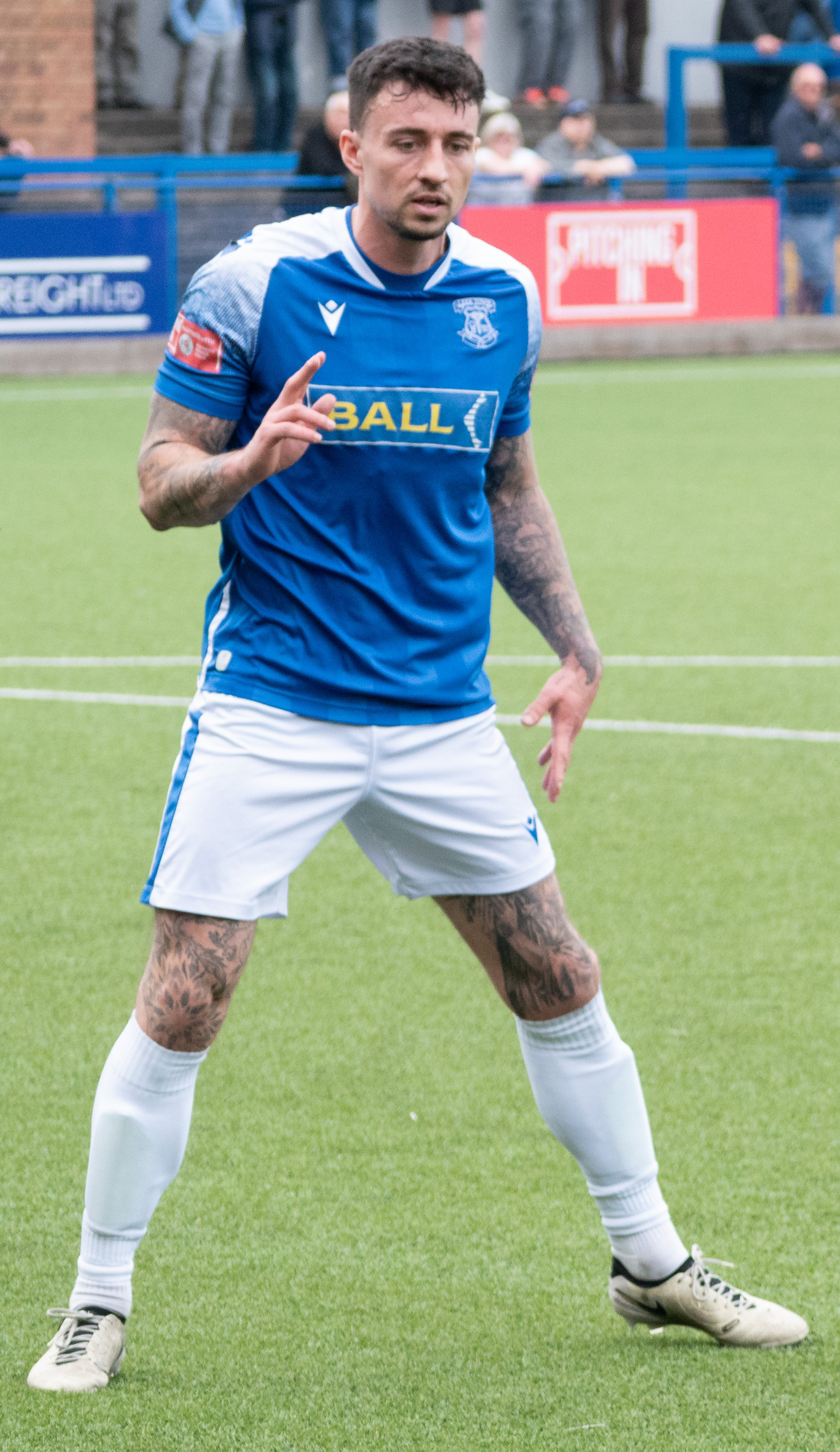
- Edwards playing for Leek Town in 2025

Personal information
- Full name: Liam John Edwards
- Date of birth: 2 October 1996 (age 30)
- Place of birth: Crewe, England
- Position: Defender

Team information
- Current team: Leek Town

Youth career
- –2015: Stoke City

Senior career*
Years	Team	Apps	(Gls)
2015–2017	Stoke City	0	(0)
2017–2022	Bolton Wanderers	6	(0)
2018–2019	→ Southport (loan)	22	(0)
2021–2022	→ Southport (loan)	9	(0)
2022–2024	Chester	47	(1)
2024–	Leek Town	36	(0)
- * Club domestic league appearances and goals as of 18:00, 31 May 2024 (UTC)

Liam John Edwards (born 2 October 1996) is an English professional footballer who plays as a defender for Northern Premier League Premier Division club Leek Town.

== Career ==
Edwards started his career in Stoke City's academy, and signed his first professional contract with them in 2015. He played no matches for the first team however, and was released in 2017. After his release, he signed for Bolton Wanderers and became captain of their U23 team. As captain, he led them to win the 2017–18 Professional Development League title.

In November 2018, Edwards signed on loan for Southport. His loan was extended to the end of the season in January 2019. He helped Southport win two trophies, the 2018–2019 Lancashire FA Challenge Trophy and Liverpool Senior Cup.

On 3 August 2019, he made his first appearance for Bolton's first team, playing the full 90 minutes of a 2–0 away defeat to Wycombe Wanderers. On 12 September 2019, he signed a new contract at Bolton until 2022. On 27 February 2020 he was ruled out for the rest of the season with injury. The injury also caused him to miss the entire 2020–2021 season as well. He finally returned from injury after 22 months out of action when he played 45 minutes for Bolton's Reserve team in a 3–0 defeat against Preston North End's reserves on 26 October 2021. A week later he made his competitive return, coming on as a late substitute in a 3–0 against Rochdale in the EFL Trophy. On 12 November 2021 Edwards re-joined Southport on an initial month's loan in order to build up match fitness having missed nearly two years of football. He made his second debut for them a day later when he started in a 4–1 against Boston United. On 13 December, the loan was extended for another month and then was extended again until the end of the season on 9 January 2022. On 3 May 2022, Bolton confirmed that he would be released at the end of his contract. After his release, he signed for Chester.

== Personal life ==
During his 23 month injury between January 2020 and November 2021, Edwards studied for a degree in chartered physiology just in case he would never be able to play again.

== Career statistics ==
As of match played 23 January 2024

Appearances and goals by club, season and competition
Club	Season	League			FA Cup		League Cup		Other		Total	
Club	Season	Division	Apps	Goals	Apps	Goals	Apps	Goals	Apps	Goals	Apps	Goals
Stoke City U-21s	2016–17	—	—		—		—		2 (Note: Appearance(s) in EFL Trophy)	0	2	0
Bolton Wanderers	2018–19	Championship	0	0	0	0	0	0	0	0	0	0
Bolton Wanderers	2019–20	League One	6	0	0	0	1	0	0	0	7	0
Bolton Wanderers	2020–21	League Two	0	0	0	0	0	0	0	0	0	0
Bolton Wanderers	2021–22	League One	0	0	0	0	0	0	1	0	1	0
Bolton Wanderers	Total		6	0	0	0	1	0	1	0	8	0
Southport (loan)	2018–19	National League North	22	0	3	0	–		4 (Note: Three appearances in Lancashire FA Challenge Trophy, one appearance in Liverpool Senior Cup)	0	29	0
Southport (loan)	2021–22	National League North	9	0	0	0	–		3 (Note: Two appearances in FA Trophy, one appearance in Lancashire FA Challenge Trophy)	0	12	0
Southport (loan)	Total		31	0	3	0	–		7	0	41	0
Chester	2022–23	National League North	26	0	2	0	–		2 (Note: One appearance in FA Trophy, one appearance in National League North play-offs)	0	30	0
Chester	2023–24	National League North	21	1	4	0	–		0	0	25	1
Chester	Total		47	1	6	0	–		2	0	55	1
Career total			84	1	9	0	1	0	12	0	106	1

== Honours ==
Bolton Wanderers Reserves

- Professional Development League: 2017–18

Southport

- Lancashire FA Challenge Trophy: 2018–19
- Liverpool Senior Cup: 2018–19
