= Joe White (defender, born 2002) =

English footballer

Personal information
- Full name: Joseph Anthony White
- Date of birth: 18 January 2002 (age 24)
- Place of birth: Liverpool, England
- Position: Defender

Youth career
- 2009-2020: Bolton Wanderers

Senior career*
Years	Team	Apps	(Gls)
2019–2020	Bolton Wanderers	4	(0)
2020–2021	Lower Breck	1	(2)
2020	→ F.C. United of Manchester (dual registration)	2	(0)
2021	Ashton Athletic	20	(0)
2021	→ F.C. United of Manchester (dual registration)	11	(0)
2022	Marine	9	(0)
2022–2023	Ashton Athletic		
2023-2024	Prestatyn Town		
2025	Mt Druitt Town Rangers	8	(0)
2025	UNSW FC	5	(0)
- * Club domestic league appearances and goals as of 27 February 2026

Joseph Anthony White (born 18 January 2002) is a footballer who last played for UNSW FC in the NSW NPL Men's League One.

== Career ==
He made his debut for Bolton Wanderers on the opening day of the 19/20 season, coming on as a 14th minute substitute for Josh Earl. After being released by Bolton at the end of the season he signed for Lower Breck for the 20/21 season and scored twice on his debut on 3 October against Ashton Town. On 17 October he also joined F.C. United of Manchester through dual registration. He played twice. He signed for Ashton Athletic for the 2021–22 season. He also once again played for F.C. United of Manchester via dual registration. In January 2022, he signed for Marine.

== Career statistics ==
As of 14 January 2022.

Appearances and goals by club, season and competition
Club	Season	League			FA Cup		League Cup		Other		Total	
Club	Season	Division	Apps	Goals	Apps	Goals	Apps	Goals	Apps	Goals	Apps	Goals
Bolton Wanderers	2019–20	League One	4	0	0	0	0	0	1 (Note: Appearance(s) in the EFL Trophy.)	0	5	0
Lower Breck	2020–21	NCWFL Division One North	1	2	0	0	–		0	0	1	2
F.C. United of Manchester	2020–21	Northern Premier League	2	0	0	0	–		0	0	2	0
Ashton Athletic	2021–22	NCWFL Premier Division	20	0	0	0	–		2 (Note: Appearance(s) in the FA Vase and Lancashire FA Challenge Trophy.)	0	22	0
F.C. United of Manchester	2021–22	Northern Premier League	11	0	0	0	–		2 (Note: Appearance(s) in the FA Trophy.)	0	13	0
Career total			38	2	0	0	0	0	5	0	43	2
