= Mountford =

Mountford may refer to:

People:

- James Mountford Allen (1809–1883), British architect
- William Fowler Mountford Copeland II, horticulturist
- Adam Mountford, producer of Test Match Special, a British radio programme covering professional cricket
- Bill Mountford (fl.), New Zealand rugby league footballer who represented New Zealand
- Bob Mountford (1952–2008), English footballer
- Carolyn Mountford, Australian researcher specializing in magnetic resonance spectroscopic imaging
- Cecil Mountford MBE (1919–2009), New Zealand rugby league footballer and coach
- Charles H. Mountford, Stratford poet and humorist
- Charles P. Mountford (1890–1976), Australian anthropologist and photographer
- Declan Mountford (born 1997), former professional Australian rules footballer
- Derek Mountford (born 1934), English former footballer
- Edward William Mountford (1855–1908), English architect who designed the Old Bailey
- Frank Mountford (1923–2006), English footballer
- Garry Mountford (born 1983), Scottish rugby union player who plays for Stirling County
- George Mountford (1890s footballer), English footballer
- George Mountford (footballer born 1921) (1921–1973), English footballer
- Guy Mountford (1905–2003), English advertising executive, amateur ornithologist and conservationist
- Harry Mountford (born 1886), English footballer
- James Mountford, 19th century footballer
- John Mountford (broadcaster) (born 1949), British television executive and former broadcaster
- John Mountford (politician) (born 1933), Australian politician
- Kali Mountford (born 1954), British Labour Party politician, MP for Colne Valley from 1997 to 2010
- Ken Mountford, New Zealand rugby league player who represented his country
- Lori Mountford (born 1959), American curler
- Margaret Mountford, a British lawyer, businesswoman and TV personality known for her role in The Apprentice
- Peter Mountford (author) (born 1976), American novelist and writer of short stories and non-fiction
- Peter Mountford (cricketer) (born 1940), English cricketer
- Peter Mountford (footballer) (born 1960), English footballer
- Reg Mountford (born 1908), professional footballer
- Sean Mountford (born 1988), English footballer
- Simon Mountford (died 1537/38) (1487–1537), English politician
- Sir Simon Mountford, English MP, executed for rebelling again the king
- Tim Mountford (born 1946), former American cyclist
- William Mountford (1816–1885), English Unitarian preacher and author
- Roy Mountford Vale (1912–1977), Australian politician
- Mountford Tosswill Woollaston (1910–1998), New Zealand painter

Places:

- Wellesbourne Mountford large village and civil parish in the county of Warwickshire, UK

Other:

- Mountford Expedition or 1948 American-Australian Scientific Expedition to Arnhem Land
- Street v Mountford UKHL 4 is an important House of Lords judgment in English property law

== See also ==
- Montford (disambiguation)
- Montfort (disambiguation)
- Mountford family
- Mountfort surname page
- Munford (disambiguation)
