= Mountfort =

Mountfort is a surname and may be:

- Benjamin Mountfort (1825–1898), English-born New Zealand architect
- Charles Mountfort (1854–1941) New Zealand surveyor
- Cyril Mountfort (1853–1920) New Zealand ecclesiastical architect
- Guy Mountfort (1905–2003), English advertising executive, amateur ornithologist and conservationist
- William de Mountfort (13th c.), English medieval canon law scholar, singer, churchman, and university chancellor
- William Mountfort (disambiguation)
- Mountford family, various

== See also ==
- Montford
- Montfort
- Mountford
