= Matthew Tweedley =

English footballer

Personal information
- Full name: Matthew James Tweedley
- Date of birth: 16 April 2004 (age 22)
- Place of birth: Rochdale, England
- Position: Midfielder

Team information
- Current team: Warrington Town

Youth career
- 2009–2022: Bolton Wanderers

Senior career*
Years	Team	Apps	(Gls)
2021–2024	Bolton Wanderers	0	(0)
2022–2023	→ Bamber Bridge (loan)	0	(0)
2023	→ Lancaster City (loan)	15	(0)
2024–2025	Nantwich Town	38	(0)
2025–	Warrington Town	0	(0)
- * Club domestic league appearances and goals as of 15:36, 1 August 2025 (UTC)

Matthew James Tweedley (born 16 April 2004) is an English footballer who plays as a midfielder for Northern Premier League Premier Division club Warrington Town.

== Playing career ==
Tweedley came through the Bolton Wanderers Reserves Academy, which he joined at the age of five.

Tweedley made his Bolton debut on 30 November 2021 in a 1–0 victory against Fleetwood Town in the EFL Trophy, coming on in the 83rd minute as a substitute for Oladapo Afolayan.

On 13 June 2022, Tweedley became one of the five Academy graduates that signed their first professional contracts with Bolton. On 26 December 2022, it was announced that he signed on a short term loan for Bamber Bridge but did not end up making an appearance. On 7 February 2023, he signed on an initial month-long loan for Lancaster City. It was later extended until the end of the season. On 25 May 2023, he signed a new one-year deal with the option for an extra year. On 22 May 2024, the club confirmed that he would be leaving at the end of his contract on 30 June.

In August 2024, he signed a contract with Northern Premier League side Nantwich Town following a successful trial spell.

In July 2025, he joined Warrington Town.

== Statistics ==
As of end of 2024–25 season

Appearances and goals by club, season and competition
Club	Season	League			FA Cup		League Cup		Other		Total	
Club	Season	Division	Apps	Goals	Apps	Goals	Apps	Goals	Apps	Goals	Apps	Goals
Bolton Wanderers	2021–22	League One	0	0	0	0	0	0	1 (Note: Appearance(s) in the EFL Trophy.)	0	1	0
Bolton Wanderers	2022–23	League One	0	0	0	0	0	0	0	0	0	0
Bolton Wanderers	2023–24	League One	0	0	0	0	0	0	0	0	0	0
Bolton Wanderers	Total		0	0	0	0	0	0	1	0	1	0
Bamber Bridge (loan)	2022–23	Northern Premier League	0	0	0	0	—		0	0	0	0
Lancaster City (loan)	2022–23	Northern Premier League	15	0	0	0	—		0	0	15	0
Nantwich Town	2024–25	Northern Premier League Division One West	38	0	1	0	—		3 (Note: Two appearances in FA Trophy, one appearance in Cheshire Senior Cup)	0	42	0
Career total			53	0	1	0	0	0	4	0	58	0
