= Bolton Wanderers F.C. Reserves and Academy =

Bolton Wanderers Under 21
- Full name: Bolton Wanderers F.C. under 21 team
- Nicknames: The Trotters, Junior Whites
- Founded: 1921
- Ground: Eddie Davies Academy; Bolton
- Manager: (England) Julian Darby (under-21s) (England) Daniel Clarke (under-18s)
- League: Professional Development League
- 2025–2026: The Central League 3rd of 10 (B team); EFL Youth Alliance North, 3rd of 12 (under-18s)
Home colours	Away colours

Bolton Wanderers under 21 team play their home games at the Eddie Davies Academy in Bolton.

Notable graduates of the squad include former captain Kevin Nolan, Republic of Ireland international Joey O'Brien and eventual first team regulars such as Nicky Hunt, Ricardo Vaz-Te, Josh Vela, Zach Clough, and Rob Holding.

Of the current squad, graduate Max Conway has featured most often at senior level, whilst Luke Hutchinson, Sam Inwood, Conor Lewis, Daeshon Lawrence, Harrison Rice, Harley Irwin, and Toby Ritchie have also made appearances for the first team squad.

== History ==
Bolton’s first ever reserve team was set up in 1921.

They have won the Central League twice in 1955 and 1995. Their most recent success came in the FA Premier Reserve league in 2007.

Previous years have seen the club compete in the Avon Insurance Premier League, FA Premier League North and Professional Development League 2.

They also participated in the Manchester Senior Cup and Lancashire Senior Cup in previous years, winning their third Manchester Senior Cup as recently as 2015 and winning the Lancashire Senior Cup twelve times, the last occasion coming in 1990–91 season.

In August 2016, the U21 side was renamed as the U23 side, after a consultation involving all 31 clubs in the Professional Development League 2, voted in favour of the new age parameters.

=== Abolishment and Re-formation ===
Due to Bolton dropping to Category Three in March 2020 Bolton had no Development Squad in the 2020–21 season. This was the first time since the reserves were created in 1921 that Bolton had not had a reserve team.

After nearly a year without reserve team football, Bolton started setting up reserve friendlies in March 2021 so that their fringe players could get game time and plan to relaunch a reserve team for the 2021–2022 season. Bolton Reserves entered The Central League for the 2021–2022 season having previously been part of that competition between 1911 and 1999. They also took part in the Central League Cup.

Starting with the 2022–2023 season, the reserves rebranded to "Bolton Wanderers B" and though they originally considered leaving the Central League to instead schedule friendlies against other B teams and U23 teams, they instead decided to stay in the League and also do said friendlies as extra matches.

In the summer of 2026, Bolton reverted back to an under-21 format to replace the B team structure that had been in place for four years.

== Grounds ==
Previous reserve grounds at Bolton include their old home at Burnden Park, Hilton Park the former home of Leigh Centurions, Bury's ground at Gigg Lane, Spotland Stadium, home of Rochdale and Rochdale Hornets and County Ground (Leyland).

Since re-forming in 2021, the reserve team play at the Eddie Davies Academy in Lostock.

Occasionally matches are played at the first team ground at the University of Bolton Stadium.

== The Academy ==
The Bolton Wanderers Academy was established in 1998 and is based at the club and the main training ground. It replaced the older, more informal youth system, and enabled the club to focus their youth development and scouting, employing new techniques and FA standards.

It is currently overseen by Dave Gardiner. It provides a stepping stone for youngsters to progress to the highest levels of football at Bolton Wanderers.

Scouts attend many local youth matches looking for talented boys. A boy will then be invited to attend training sessions at the academy. They are taken in as young as the age of eight. At this age, the boys start by simply attending after-school training sessions, but as they reach their middle-teens, their academic needs will be taken over by the academy if they are deemed athletically talented enough.

Between the ages of eight and twelve the boys play in eight-a-side games of three twenty-minute periods. It allows the boys to play as defenders or as attackers in small groups within a system and is not as physically demanding as playing eleven-a-side matches.

The first player to graduate from the academy to the first team was the former club captain, Kevin Nolan who had previously been on the youth books of Liverpool. He has since been followed into the first team by Joey O'Brien, Ricardo Vaz Tê, Nicky Hunt. Josh Vela, Zach Clough and Rob Holding amongst others.

In December 2012, the Bolton Academy was awarded Elite status by the Premier League.

In June 2015, it was announced that the club had sought to downgrade from a Category One status in order to save money. In March 2020, the club announced it would down grade to Category Three. In July 2026, the club announced that it had returned to Category Two status.

== Players ==
=== Academy (Under-18s) ===
As of July 2026.

Name	Position	Scholarship Level	Nationality
Gabriel Davidson	Goalkeeper	1st Year	(England)
James Shillinglaw	Goalkeeper	2nd Year	(England)
Rowan Baucutt	Defender	2nd Year	(England)
Zak Doyle	Defender	1st Year	(England)
Josh Duggan	Defender	1st Year	(England)
Louie Evans	Defender	2nd Year	(Wales)
Levi Kendrick	Defender	2nd Year	(England)
Joe Lamb	Defender	1st Year	(England)
Charlie Quirk	Defender	2nd Year	(England)
Alfie Baxter	Midfielder	1st Year	(England)
Oliver Best	Midfielder	2nd Year	(England)
Denver Clement	Midfielder	2nd Year	(England)
Quines Fakhy	Midfielder	2nd Year	(England)
Alfie Healy	Midfielder	2nd Year	(England)
Sam Hopkinson	Midfielder	2nd Year	(England)
Na'im Zuill	Midfielder	1st Year	(Bermuda)
Sonny Coyne	Forward	1st Year	(England)
Asa Littler	Forward	1st Year	(England)
Aidan Mee	Forward	1st Year	(England)
Daniel Ogburu	Forward	2nd Year	(England)

== Managerial History ==
=== Reserves/Development Squad/B Team/U21 Team ===
- 1991–2000: Steve Carroll
- 2000–2005: Neil McDonald
- 2005–2008: Jimmy Phillips
- 2008–2010: Alan Cork
- 2010–2012: John Henry
- 2013–2014: Jamie Fullarton
- 2014–2016: Iain Brunskill
- 2016–2020: David Lee
- 2021–2022: Sam Hird
- 2022–2023: Matt Craddock
- 2024–2026: Andy Taylor
- 2026–: Julian Darby

=== Youth Team/Academy ===
- 1985–1991: Steve Carroll
- 1991–1998: Dean Crombie
- 1998–2000: Martin Dobson
- 2000–2008: Chris Sulley
- 2008–2020: Jimmy Phillips
- 2020–2022: Mark Litherland
- 2022–2026: Julian Darby
- 2026–: Danny Clarke

== Staff ==
- Senior Professional Development Phase Coach.: (England) Julian Darby
- Player/Coach: (England) Andrew Tutte
- Head of Academy: (England) Dave Gardiner
- Academy Lead Professional Development Phase Coach: (England) Daniel Clarke
- Academy Lead Youth Development Coach: (England) Andy Parrish
- Academy Lead Goalkeeping Coach: (England) Mackenzie Chapman
- Academy Video Analyst: (England) Matt Stephens
- Academy Strength & Conditioning Coach: (England) James Welsh
- Academy Physiotherapist: (England) David Newbold
- Academy Physiotherapist: (England) Matt Pearce
- Head of Academy Education: (England) Alex Norwood

In addition, the academy employ staff from the first-team.

== Graduates ==
The following players have been associated with the Bolton Wanderers Academy and have gone on to play league football for Bolton or other clubs since the academy was founded in 1998.

Academy Graduates who have made at least one senior appearance for the Bolton Wanderers first team.

- (England) David Abimbola
- (England) Matthew Alexander
- (England) Bright Amoateng
- (England) Sam Ashton
- (Poland) Błażej Augustyn
- (England) Chris Basham
- (England) Adam Blakeman
- (England) Jordan Boon
- (England) Harry Brockbank
- (England) Eddie Brown
- (England) De'Marlio Brown-Sterling
- (Northern Ireland) Wayne Buchanan
- (England) Zach Clough
- (England) Charlie Comyn-Platt
- (Republic of Ireland) Luca Connell
- (England) Max Conway
- (England) Ronan Darcy
- (England) Jack Earing
- (England) Jay Fitzmartin
- (Poland) Jarosław Fojut
- (England) Tyler Garratt
- (France) Arthur Gnahoua
- (England) Sonny Graham
- (England) Mitchell Henry
- (England) Sean Hogan
- (England) Rob Holding
- (England) Nicky Hunt
- (England) Luke Hutchinson
- (Northern Ireland) Sam Inwood
- (England) Harley Irwin
- (England) Andy Kellett
- (Wales) Callum King-Harmes
- (England) Daeshon Lawrence
- (Northern Ireland) Chris Lester
- (England) Conor Lewis
- (England) Danny Livesey
- (England) Finlay Lockett
- (England) Niall Maher
- (England) Aaron Morley
- (Malta) Joe Muscatt
- (England) Kevin Nolan
- (England) Temitope Obadeyi
- (England) Sanmi Odelusi
- (Republic of Ireland) Joey O'Brien
- (Scotland) Michael O'Halloran
- (England) Alex Perry
- (England) Arran Pettifer
- (Romania) Dennis Politic
- (England) Harrison Rice
- (England) Joe Riley
- (England) Regan Riley
- (England) Toby Ritchie
- (Iran) Alex Samizadeh
- (England) Adam Senior
- (Guyana) Ricky Shakes
- (Egypt) Sonny Sharples-Ahmed
- (England) James Sinclair
- (England) Robert Sissons
- (United States) Johann Smith
- (England) Oliver Smith
- (Jamaica) Cleveland Taylor
- (England) Oscar Threlkeld
- (England) Lamine Toure
- (England) Matthew Tweedley
- (Portugal) Ricardo Vaz Tê
- (England) Josh Vela
- (England) Tom Walker
- (England) Danny Ward
- (England) Joe White
- (England) Nathan Woolfe
- (England) Tom Youngs

Other players associated with the academy who have made at least one senior appearance for league clubs in Britain or abroad.

- (England) James Ball
- (England) Rhys Bennett
- (England) Michael Bird
- (France) Bédi Buval
- (Wales) Michael Byrne
- (Republic of Ireland) Matthew Cassidy
- (England) James Caton
- (Austria) Christopher Cvetko
- (England) Tom Eckersley
- (England) Mark Ellis
- (England) Ashley Fletcher
- (England) Tom Grivosti
- (England) Brad Holmes
- (England) Chris Howarth
- (Bulgaria) Georg Iliev
- (Finland) Will Jääskeläinen
- (Australia) Scott Jamieson
- (Poland) Przemysław Kazimierczak
- (England) Rob Lainton
- (England) Jay Lynch
- (England) Alex McQuade
- (Cyprus) Marcos Michael
- (Australia) Aaron Mooy
- (England) Sean Mountford
- (England) Alex Newby
- (Republic of Ireland) Alan O'Hare
- (Republic of Ireland) Ike Orazi
- (England) Nathaniel Phillips
- (Hong Kong) Anthony Pinto
- (England) Aaron Ramsdale
- (England) Jack Sampson
- (Germany) Jan-Ole Sievers
- (England) Chris Stokes
- (Norway) André Sødlund
- (England) Jason Talbot
- (Wales) Jamie Thomas
- (England) Les Thompson
- (England) Matt Tubbs
- (England) Jake Turner
- (Germany) Kevin Wolze
- (Philippines) Luke Woodland
