= Mitchell Henry (disambiguation) =

Mitchell Henry is a financier.

Mitchell Henry may also refer to:

- Mitchell Henry (American football), American football player
- Mitchell Henry (footballer), English association footballer
