= Lloyd Isgrove =

English footballer (born 1993)

Personal information
- Full name: Lloyd Jeffrey Isgrove
- Date of birth: 12 January 1993 (age 33)
- Place of birth: Yeovil, England
- Height: 1.78 m (5 ft 10 in)
- Position: Winger

Team information
- Current team: Hume City

Youth career
- 2002–2012: Southampton

Senior career*
Years	Team	Apps	(Gls)
2012–2017	Southampton	1	(0)
2014	→ Peterborough United (loan)	10	(1)
2015	→ Sheffield Wednesday (loan)	8	(0)
2015–2016	→ Barnsley (loan)	27	(0)
2017–2019	Barnsley	18	(1)
2019	→ Portsmouth (loan)	0	(0)
2019–2020	Swindon Town	29	(0)
2020–2023	Bolton Wanderers	53	(3)
2023	Sholing	9	(0)
2024–2026	Hume City	43	(21)
2026-	St Albans Dinamo		

International career^{‡}
2013–2014	Wales U21	6	(0)
2016	Wales	1	(0)
- * Club domestic league appearances and goals as of 13:34, 7 August 2024 (UTC) ‡ National team caps and goals as of 21:11, 24 March 2016 (UTC)

Lloyd Jeffrey Isgrove (born 12 January 1993) is a professional footballer who plays for National Premier Leagues Victoria club St Albans Dinamo.

Isgrove plays primarily as a winger, but he is also comfortable playing in other midfield positions and as a forward. He has one cap for Wales.

== Club career ==
=== Southampton ===
Isgrove was a member of Southampton's academy system; his first inclusion in the Southampton's first team came on 30 October 2012 in the fourth round of the 2012–13 League Cup against Leeds United, for which he was included on the bench. The midfielder came on as a substitute for winger Steve De Ridder in the 66th minute, seeing out the remainder of the 3–0 defeat. He made his first start for the club the following August in a 5–1 victory against Barnsley in the League Cup second round, setting up the opening goal.

Isgrove made his league debut for Southampton in the first game of the 2014–15 season, playing the last 8 minutes of a 2–1 loss at Liverpool in place of Steven Davis.

On 17 March 2015, Southampton confirmed that Isgrove had signed a two-year contract extension until 2017. He was released by Southampton at the end of the 2016–17 season.

==== Peterborough United (loan) ====
On 13 March 2014, Isgrove joined League One club Peterborough United on a one-month loan, subsequently extended to the end of the season.

Isgrove also played in the 2014 Football League Trophy Final, which Peterborough won 3–1 against Chesterfield on 30 March 2014 at Wembley Stadium. Isgrove returned to Southampton after his loan with Peterborough ended.

==== Sheffield Wednesday (loan) ====
On 18 March 2015, Isgrove signed an emergency loan deal with Sheffield Wednesday until the end of the season. Isgrove made eight appearances for Sheffield Wednesday, before he returned to Southampton.

==== Barnsley (loan) ====
On 24 October 2015, Isgrove completed a loan move to League One club Barnsley where he stayed until the end of the season. He helped Barnsley win the Football League Trophy, beating Oxford United of League Two 3–2 in the final at Wembley.

Isgrove returned to Wembley for the play-off final in May. He scored his first goal for the club after 74 minutes as Barnsley beat Millwall 3–1 to gain promotion to the Championship. He returned to Southampton at the end of the season, when his loan ended.

=== Barnsley ===
After Southampton released Isgrove at the end of the 2016–17 season, he signed a three-year contract with Championship club Barnsley.

On 30 January 2019, Isgrove signed for League One Portsmouth on a loan deal until the end of the 2018–19 season

He was released by Barnsley at the end of the 2018–19 season.

=== Swindon Town ===
On 30 July 2019, Isgrove joined League Two side Swindon Town on a one-year deal following a successful trial.

=== Bolton Wanderers ===
On 26 September 2020, Isgrove signed for newly relegated League Two side Bolton Wanderers on a one-year contract, joining former Swindon Teammate Eoin Doyle. He made his debut the same day, coming on as a 65th-minute substitute for Jak Hickman in a 0–2 home defeat against Newport County. On 5 December 2020 he scored his first Bolton goal when he scored Bolton's third goal in a 3–6 defeat against Port Vale. On 26 May 2021, he signed a new two-year contract. During the 2021–22 season, due to injury to Gethin Jones and poor form by Harry Brockbank, Isgrove played multiple matches as a right-back. He was injured in November 2021, and after returning to fitness in March 2022 he was injured playing for the reserves and missed the rest of the season. On 2 April, Bolton won 4–0 against Plymouth Argyle in the 2023 EFL Trophy Final He missed the match through injury, though still received a medal as he had played in the earlier rounds. He continued to struggle with injury during the 2022–23 season, and on 23 May the club confirmed that Isgrove would be leaving at the end of his contract in June.

=== Sholing ===
Following his release from Bolton, Isgrove joined Southern Football League Premier Division South club Sholing, appearing in a matchday squad for the first time on 26 September 2023.

=== Hume City ===
On 22 September 2023, National Premier Leagues Victoria club Hume City announced the future signing of Isgrove, joining the club for the 2024 season.

== International career ==
In January 2013 Isgrove was selected for the Wales under-21 squad and made his debut in a 3–0 win against Iceland in a friendly match on 6 February 2013. Injuries saw Isgrove called up to the Welsh senior squad in October 2013, he remained on the bench in a 1–1 draw with Belgium.

He made his senior international debut on 24 March 2016 as a 62nd-minute substitute in a friendly against Northern Ireland, helping Wales to a 1–1 draw.

== Career statistics ==
As of match played 21 November 2023

Appearances and goals by club, season and competition
Season	Club	League			FA Cup		League Cup		Other		Total	
Season	Club	Division	Apps	Goals	Apps	Goals	Apps	Goals	Apps	Goals	Apps	Goals
Southampton	2012–13	Premier League	0	0	0	0	1	0	—		1	0
Southampton	2013–14	Premier League	0	0	0	0	1	0	—		1	0
Southampton	2014–15	Premier League	1	0	1	0	2	0	—		4	0
Southampton	2015–16	Premier League	0	0	—		0	0	0	0	0	0
Southampton	2016–17	Premier League	0	0	1	0	1	0	0	0	2	0
Southampton	Total		1	0	2	0	5	0	0	0	8	0
Peterborough United (loan)	2013–14	League One	8	1	—		—		3 (Note: Two appearances in League One play-offs, one in Football League Trophy)	0	11	1
Sheffield Wednesday (loan)	2014–15	Championship	8	0	—		—		—		8	0
Barnsley (loan)	2015–16	League One	27	0	1	0	—		7 (Note: Three appearances and one goal in League One play-offs, four appearances in Football League Trophy)	1	35	1
Southampton U23	2016–17	—	—		—		—		2 (Note: Two appearances and one goal in the EFL Trophy)	1	2	1
Barnsley	2017–18	Championship	16	1	1	0	0	0	—		17	1
Barnsley	2018–19	League One	2	0	0	0	1	0	3 (Note: Appearances in EFL Trophy)	0	6	0
Barnsley	Total		18	1	1	0	1	0	3	0	23	1
Portsmouth (loan)	2018–19	League One	0	0	—		—		—		0	0
Swindon Town	2019–20	League Two	29	0	0	0	1	0	2	0	32	0
Bolton Wanderers	2020–21	League Two	32	3	1	0	—		1	0	34	3
Bolton Wanderers	2021–22	League One	18	0	2	0	1	0	3	0	24	0
Bolton Wanderers	2022–23	League One	3	0	0	0	0	0	3	0	6	0
Bolton Wanderers	Total		53	3	3	0	1	0	7	0	64	3
Sholing	2023–24	Southern League; Premier Division South	9	0	0	0	—		1 (Note: Appearance in FA Trophy)	0	10	0
Career total			153	5	7	0	8	0	25	2	193	7

== Honours ==
Peterborough United

- Football League Trophy: 2013–14

Barnsley

- Football League One play-offs: 2016
- Football League Trophy: 2015–16

Swindon Town

- EFL League Two: 2019–20

Bolton Wanderers

- EFL League Two third-place promotion: 2020–21
- EFL Trophy: 2022–23
