= William Mountfort (disambiguation) =

William Mountfort was an actor and writer.

William Mountfort may also refer to:

- William de Mountfort
- William Mountfort (MP) (died 1452), MP for Warwickshire 8 times between 1410 and 1450

== See also ==
- William Mountford
