= Montford Point (disambiguation) =

Montford Point may refer to:

- Montford Point, North Carolina, USA; a headland
- Camp Montford Point; former name of Camp Gilbert H. Johnson, a U.S. Marines satellite campus of Camp Lejuene USMC base; at Montford Point, NC, USA
- Montford Point Museum, Camp Gilbert H. Johnson, USMC
- Montford Point Marine Association, a non-profit U.S. veterans association
- USNS Montford Point (T-ESD-1), a Montford Point class mobile landing platform, the lead ship of its class
- Montford Point class mobile landing platform, a ship class, a class of expeditionary transfer dock ship

== See also ==
- Mount Ford
- Montford (disambiguation)
- Ford (disambiguation)
- Mont (disambiguation)
