= Munford =

Munford may refer to:

== Places in the United States ==
- Munford, Alabama, a town
- Munford, Tennessee, a city
- Munford, Virginia, an unincorporated community

== People ==
- Beverley B. Munford (1856–1910), American lawyer, politician, social reformer, speaker and author
- Don Munford (born 1954), American politician
- Harvey Munford (1940–2023), American politician
- Marc Munford (born 1965), American former football player
- Mary-Cooke Branch Munford (1865–1938), American activist for women's rights, civil rights, women's suffrage and education
- Robert Munford (1925–1991), American artist and educator
- Robert S. Munford (born 1942) American scientist and professor
- Robyn Munford, New Zealand social work researcher and professor
- Thayer Munford (born 1999), American football player
- Thomas T. Munford (1831–1918), Confederate acting brigadier general in the Civil War
- Xavier Munford (born 1992), American basketball player for Hapoel Tel Aviv of the Israeli Basketball Premier League

== Other uses ==
- Battle of Munford, a Civil War battle at Munford, Alabama
- Munford High School, Munford, Tennessee
