= Dapo Afolayan =

English footballer (born 1997)

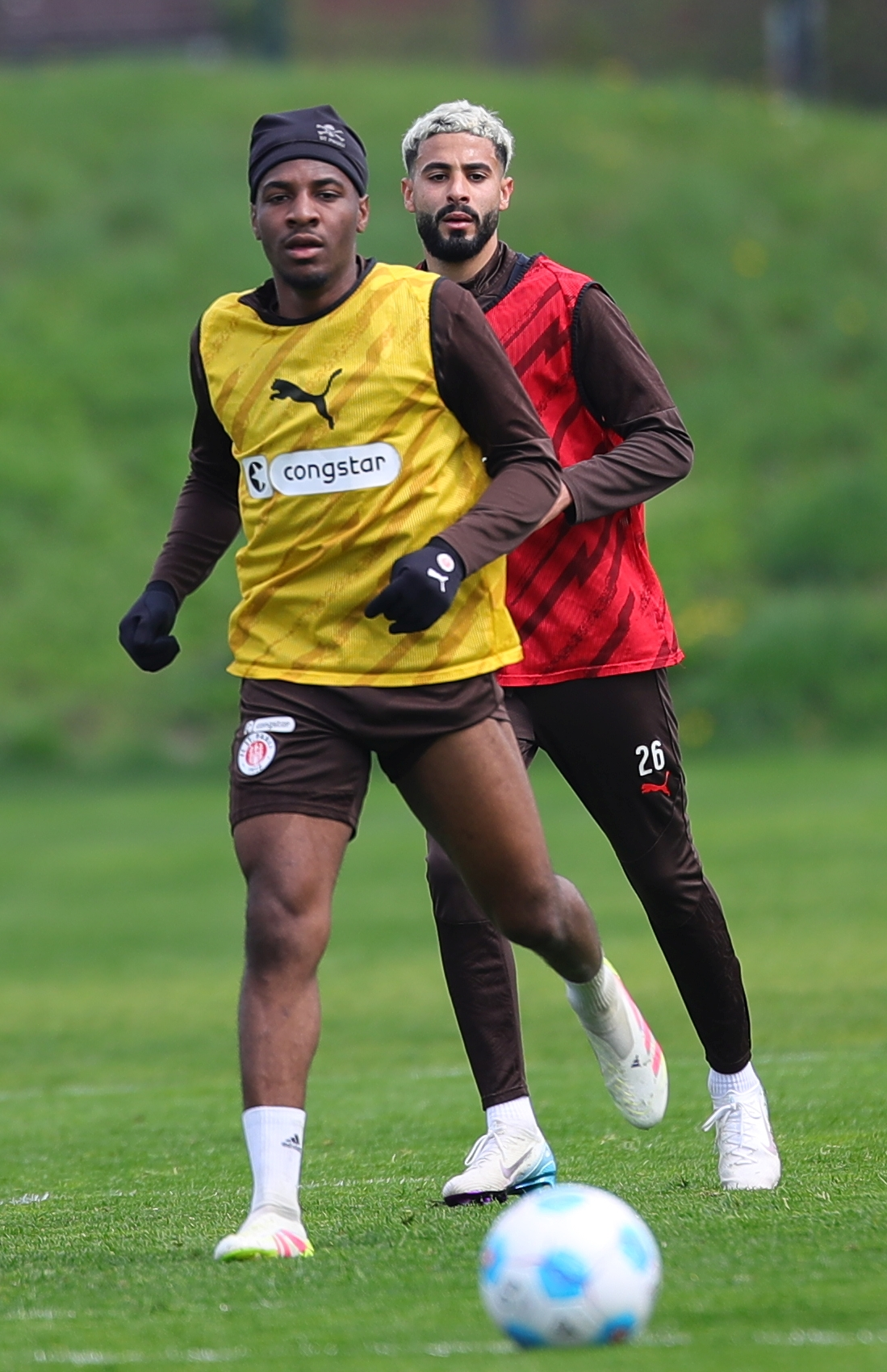
- Afolayan in 2025

Personal information
- Full name: Oladapo Joshua Afolayan
- Date of birth: 11 September 1997 (age 29)
- Place of birth: Harrow, England
- Height: 5 ft 11 in (1.80 m)
- Positions: Winger; centre-forward

Team information
- Current team: Blackburn Rovers
- Number: 21

Youth career
- 2002–2006: Harrow St Marys
- 2006–2011: Chelsea
- 2012–2015: Toronto FC
- 2015–2016: Barnet
- 2016: Tooting & Mitcham United

College career
Years	Team	Apps	(Gls)
2014	Toronto Varsity Blues	11	(1)

Senior career*
Years	Team	Apps	(Gls)
2014–2015	Toronto FC III		
2015	ANB Futbol		
2016–2017	Loughborough University	11	(3)
2017–2018	Solihull Moors	45	(15)
2018–2021	West Ham United	0	(0)
2019	→ Oldham Athletic (loan)	10	(0)
2019–2020	→ Mansfield Town (loan)	6	(1)
2021	→ Bolton Wanderers (loan)	21	(1)
2021–2023	Bolton Wanderers	66	(15)
2023–2026	FC St. Pauli	86	(15)
2026–	Blackburn Rovers	24	(5)

International career
2017	England C	1	(0)
- * Club domestic league appearances and goals as of 14:43, 22 November 2026 (UTC)

Oladapo Joshua Afolayan (born 11 September 1997) is an English professional footballer who plays as a winger or centre-forward for EFL Championship club Blackburn Rovers.

He spent his youth at a number of clubs: Harrow St Marys, Chelsea, Toronto FC, Barnet, and Tooting & Mitcham United. He also played at the university level in Canada with the University of Toronto Varsity Blues. After playing local football in Canada with ANB Futbol, he played for English non-league clubs Loughborough University and Solihull Moors, before moving to Premier League club West Ham United. He had loan spells at Oldham Athletic, Mansfield Town, and Bolton Wanderers, with the latter move becoming permanent, before signing for German club FC St. Pauli. He joined Blackburn Rovers in 2026.

He was capped by the England C team in 2017.

== Personal life ==
He left the Chelsea academy in order to concentrate on his GCSEs. He moved to Canada with his family but returned to England to study civil engineering at Loughborough University.

== Club career ==
=== Early career ===
Afolayan joined Harrow St Marys at under-5 level and moved into the youth system at Chelsea at the age of nine, having turned down the chance of a rival offer from Arsenal. He struggled with his short stature as a teenager and was restricted to playing as a winger. He left Chelsea at the age of 14 so that academy football did not get in the way of his schooling, at Merchant Taylors School.

At the age of 15, Afolayan moved to Canada and spent time in Toronto FC's reserve squad in League1 Ontario and the Premier Development League. He later said that despite being just 16 he "trained with the first team quite a bit and played with the likes of Jermain Defoe, Michael Bradley, Jozy Altidore and Sebastian Giovinco". Late in the 2015 season, he played for ANB Futbol in League1 Ontario. He also played for the University of Toronto Varsity Blues, while in Canada.

Afolayan returned to England at the age of 18 to study a civil engineering degree at Loughborough University. He spent time playing youth football at Barnet and Tooting & Mitcham United. He went on to play for the Loughborough University football team whilst studying, scoring three goals in 11 appearances for the club in the Midland League.

=== Solihull Moors ===
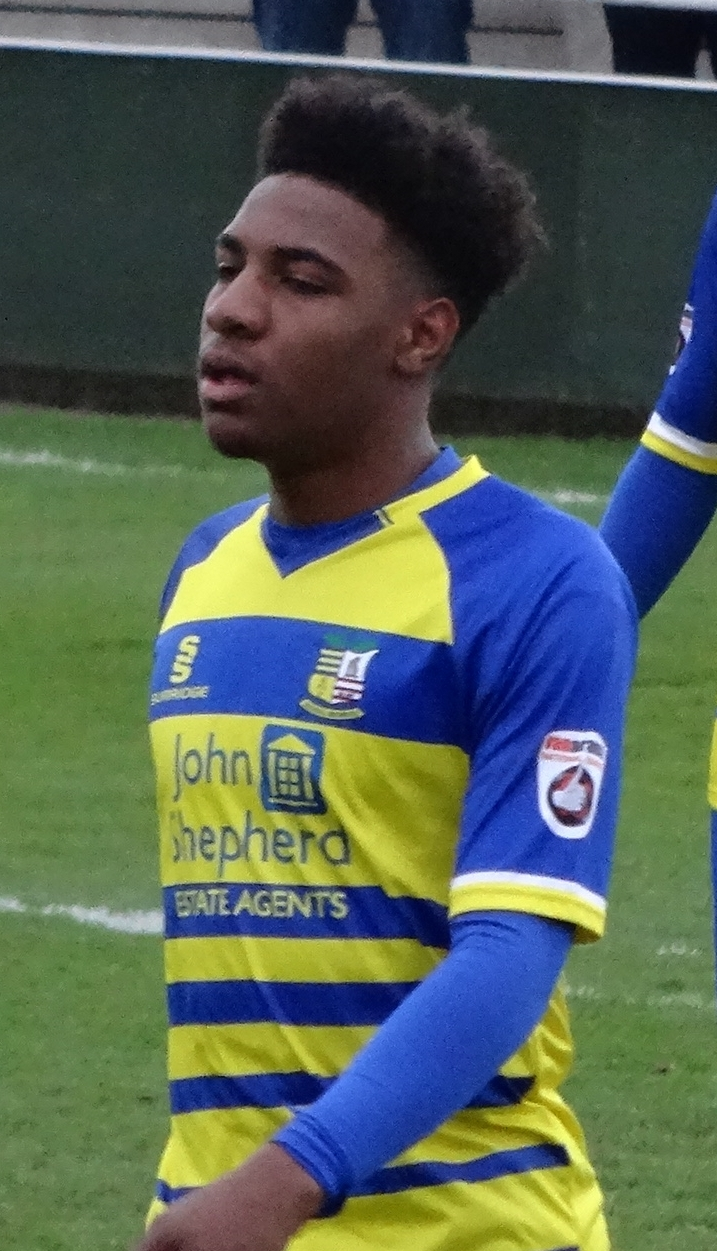
Afolayan playing for Solihull Moors in 2017.

On 7 February 2017, Afolayan signed for National League club Solihull Moors; he had previously been on trial at Rochdale. Four days after joining the Moors, Afolayan scored on his debut, scoring the final goal in a 3–0 win over Sutton United at Damson Park. He scored four goals in 15 games in the 2016–17 season and turned fully professional at the club in the summer, switching his engineering degree at Loughborough University for an online course. He also spent time at Jamie Vardy's V9 Academy. On 27 January 2018, Afolayan scored in his final game for the club, in a 3–1 win against Dagenham & Redbridge. Despite leaving the club half way through the campaign, he was Solihull's top-scorer for the entire 2017–18 season with 11 goals in 35 matches; Solihull ended the season in 18th place under the stewardship of Mark Yates.

=== West Ham United ===
On 1 February 2018, Afolayan signed a three-and-a-half-year contract with Premier League club West Ham United. On 31 January 2019, he joined League Two side Oldham Athletic on loan until the end of the 2018–19 season. He made his Football League debut for Oldham in a 3–1 loss away to Bury on 23 February; he came onto the pitch as a 76th-minute substitute for Zak Dearnley. In total he made four starts and six substitute appearances during his time at Boundary Park and said he learned a lot form working under manager Paul Scholes.

He returned to League Two on a half-season loan with Mansfield Town on 29 August 2019. He scored his first Football League goal on 12 October, in a 6–1 win over former club Oldham Athletic at Field Mill; he also won a penalty in the game. Manager John Dempster said: "What impressed me was the distance he covered. He was pressing all over the pitch. He ran himself into the ground."

On 23 January 2021, Afolayan made his debut for West Ham, appearing as a substitute and scoring in a 4–0 FA Cup win against Doncaster Rovers.

=== Bolton Wanderers ===
Afolayan moved on loan to Bolton Wanderers on 1 February 2021. Bolton had the option to make the deal permanent at the end of his loan.

His debut came on 9 February, when he came on as a substitute for Lloyd Isgrove in a 1–1 draw against Morecambe. His first start came four days later in a 1–0 win against Stevenage. He scored his first goal for Bolton on the final day of the season, scoring Bolton's second goal in a 4–1 win against Crawley Town, the win confirming Bolton's promotion to League One.

On 27 May 2021, Afolayan signed a permanent three-year contract with Bolton, after Bolton activated the option clause in the loan agreement.

Afolayan started off the 2021–22 EFL League One campaign in excellent form, scoring six goals in the opening eleven games and was voted as Bolton's Player of the Month for both August and September 2021. He finished the season with 14 goals, making him Bolton's leading scorer, and he was voted as the club's Player of the Year for the 2021–22 season.

The 2022–2023 season saw Bolton change formation. In addition to that, as well as new signings playing well, his playing time became limited with Bolton trying to play him in various different positions to no avail. As a result, in January 2023, Afolayan was the subject of transfer bids from multiple clubs, with it being confirmed that Afolayan would leave the club.

=== FC St. Pauli ===
On 19 January 2023, Afolayan signed for 2. Bundesliga side FC St. Pauli after originally having three bids rejected by Bolton Wanderers, their fourth bid finally meeting Bolton's valuation. The fee was undisclosed, though The Bolton News reported it was around £500,000. On 12 May 2024, he scored a brace in a 3–1 win over VfL Osnabrück, which secured promotion of his club to the Bundesliga for the first time since 2010–11.

=== Blackburn Rovers ===
On 1 February 2026, Afolayan signed for Blackburn Rovers on an 18-month contract, for an undisclosed fee.

== International career ==
Afolayan won a cap for Paul Fairclough's England C team on 8 November 2017, coming on as a 76th-minute substitute for Fejiri Okenabirhie in a 4–0 defeat to eventual International Challenge Trophy winners Slovakia U23.

== Style of play ==
Afolayan can play as a winger or centre-forward. West Ham Academy director Terry Westley said in 2018 that he is an "interesting player" who is "aggressive, has great pace and the knack of scoring goal". Bolton Wanderers fans compared him to Jay-Jay Okocha due to the silky skills he produced whilst playing for them. Afolayan enjoyed these comparisons and after scoring against AFC Wimbledon in August 2021 he performed Okocha's signature goal celebration.

== Career statistics ==
As of match played 22 November 2026

Appearances and goals by club, season and competition
Club	Season	League			National cup (Note: Includes FA Cup, DFB-Pokal)		League cup (Note: Includes EFL Cup)		Other		Total	
Club	Season	Division	Apps	Goals	Apps	Goals	Apps	Goals	Apps	Goals	Apps	Goals
Toronto FC III	2015	Premier Development League	10	1	—		—		—		10	1
Loughborough University	2016–17	Midland League Premier Division	11	3	0	0	—		0	0	11	3
Solihull Moors	2016–17	National League	15	4	0	0	—		0	0	15	4
Solihull Moors	2017–18	National League	30	11	3	0	—		2 (Note: Appearances in FA Trophy)	0	35	11
Solihull Moors	Total		45	15	3	0	0	0	2	0	50	15
West Ham United U21	2020–21	–	—		—		—		4 (Note: Appearances in EFL Trophy)	0	4	0
West Ham United	2018–19	Premier League	0	0	0	0	0	0	—		0	0
West Ham United	2019–20	Premier League	0	0	0	0	0	0	—		0	0
West Ham United	2020–21	Premier League	0	0	1	1	0	0	—		1	1
West Ham United	Total		0	0	1	1	0	0	0	0	1	1
Oldham Athletic (loan)	2018–19	League Two	10	0	0	0	0	0	0	0	10	0
Mansfield Town (loan)	2019–20	League Two	6	1	0	0	0	0	2	0	8	1
Bolton Wanderers (loan)	2020–21	League Two	21	1	—		—		—		21	1
Bolton Wanderers	2021–22	League One	44	12	2	0	1	0	4	2	51	14
Bolton Wanderers	2022–23	League One	22	3	1	0	2	1	4	2	29	6
Bolton Wanderers	Total		66	15	3	0	2	1	8	4	80	20
FC St. Pauli	2022–23	2. Bundesliga	16	3	—		—		—		16	3
FC St. Pauli	2023–24	2. Bundesliga	31	9	3	1	—		—		34	10
FC St. Pauli	2024–25	Bundesliga	32	3	2	0	—		—		34	3
FC St. Pauli	2025–26	Bundesliga	7	0	2	0	—		—		9	0
FC St. Pauli	Total		86	15	7	1	—		—		92	16
Blackburn Rovers	2025–26	Championship	8	0	—		—		—		8	0
Blackburn Rovers	2026–27	Championship	16	5	0	0	2	1	–		18	6
Blackburn Rovers	Total		24	5	0	0	2	1	0	0	26	6
Career total			279	56	14	2	5	2	16	4	314	64

== Honours ==
Bolton Wanderers

- EFL League Two: third place promotion 2020-21

FC St. Pauli

- 2.Bundesliga : 2023–24

Individual

- Bolton Wanderers Player of the Year: 2021–22
