= 2021–22 Bolton Wanderers F.C. season =

Bolton Wanderers
2021–22 season
- Chairman: Sharon Brittan
- Manager: Ian Evatt
- Stadium: University of Bolton Stadium
- League One: 9th
- FA Cup: First round
- EFL Cup: Second round
- EFL Trophy: Third round
- Top goalscorer: League: Oladapo Afolayan (12); All: Oladapo Afolayan (14)
- Highest home attendance: 20,892 (vs. Wigan Athletic, 16 October)
- Lowest home attendance: 1,773 (vs. Fleetwood Town, 30 November)
- Average home league attendance: 16,104
Home colours	Away colours

The 2021–22 season is Bolton Wanderers's 133rd season in their history. It covers the period from 1 July 2021 to 30 June 2022. It was the club's first season back in League One following their immediate promotion from League Two the previous season.

== Squad ==
=== First team ===
Note: Flags indicate national team as defined under FIFA eligibility rules; some limited exceptions apply. Players may hold more than one non-FIFA nationality.

No.	Pos.	Nation	Player
2	DF	AUS	Gethin Jones
3	DF	WAL	Declan John
4	MF	WAL	MJ Williams
5	DF	POR	Ricardo Santos (captain)
6	DF	SCO	George Johnston
8	MF	WAL	Josh Sheehan
9	FW	ISL	Jón Daði Böðvarsson
10	FW	NIR	Dion Charles
11	FW	SLE	Amadou Bakayoko
12	GK	ENG	Joel Dixon
14	MF	ENG	Xavier Amaechi (on loan from Hamburger SV)
15	DF	ENG	Will Aimson
16	MF	ENG	Aaron Morley
17	FW	ENG	Oladapo Afolayan

No.	Pos.	Nation	Player
18	MF	ENG	Andrew Tutte
19	GK	ENG	James Trafford (on loan from Manchester City)
20	MF	ENG	Kieran Lee
22	MF	IRL	Kieran Sadlier
23	MF	WAL	Lloyd Isgrove
24	FW	COD	Elias Kachunga
25	MF	ENG	George Thomason
27	DF	ENG	Alex Baptiste
29	DF	GUY	Liam Gordon
32	MF	ENG	Kyle Dempsey
34	DF	ENG	Adam Senior
40	GK	ENG	Luke Hutchinson
44	FW	ENG	Finlay Lockett
45	MF	ENG	Jay Fitzmartin

=== Out on loan ===
Note: Flags indicate national team as defined under FIFA eligibility rules; some limited exceptions apply. Players may hold more than one non-FIFA nationality.

No.	Pos.	Nation	Player
7	FW	ENG	Nathan Delfouneso (on loan at Bradford City until June 2022)
26	DF	ENG	Liam Edwards (on loan at Southport until June 2022)
30	MF	ENG	Ronan Darcy (on loan at Queen's Park until June 2022)

No.	Pos.	Nation	Player
41	DF	GUY	Reiss Greenidge (on loan at Barnet until June 2022)
43	GK	ENG	Matthew Alexander (on loan at Runcorn Linnets until June 2022)

=== Youth players with first team appearances ===
Note: Flags indicate national team as defined under FIFA eligibility rules; some limited exceptions apply. Players may hold more than one non-FIFA nationality.

No.	Pos.	Nation	Player
42	MF	ENG	Matthew Tweedley
48	FW	ENG	Mitchell Henry

No.	Pos.	Nation	Player
49	MF	ENG	Arran Pettifer

=== Youth players with first team squad numbers ===
Note: Flags indicate national team as defined under FIFA eligibility rules; some limited exceptions apply. Players may hold more than one non-FIFA nationality.

No.	Pos.	Nation	Player
47	MF	ENG	Max Conway

== Pre-season friendlies ==
Bolton Wanderers confirmed they would play friendly matches against Longridge Town, Atherton Collieries, FC United of Manchester, Preston North End, Bamber Bridge Barrow, Chorley Blackburn Rovers and Chester as part of their pre-season schedule. Bolton's friendly against Longridge Town was a clause included as part of the transfer agreement for George Thomason though presumably was delayed a year to allow fans to attend. Longridge also decided to use the match to celebrate their 25th anniversary. The match against Chorley is for the Harold Taylor Memorial Trophy, the first time it has been used since 2017. On 23 June Bolton announced they would have two XI sides play against Norwich City's Norwich City U-23 and Norwich City U-18 teams on 31 July before their match against Blackburn Rovers. Only the match against Norwich U-18 appears to have actually happened, however.

Bolton were meant to have a pre-season training camp in Scotland in early July 2021, however Scotland's government banned travel from Bolton to Scotland due to rising cases in COVID-19 in Bolton. "Essential travel" was permitted, with Bolton's training camp being considered "essential" due to them being elite sportsman – however Bolton decided to cancel the trip as non essential staff weren't allowed to travel in addition to not wanting to become a political tool between Scotland and England over the travel ban.

10 July 2021 Friendly	Longridge Town	1–3	Bolton Wanderers	Longridge
15:00 BST	Pociask 18'	Report	Brockbank 70'; Bakayoko 80'; Darcy 90+4'	Stadium: Mike Riding Ground; Attendance: 625

13 July 2021 Friendly	Atherton Collieries	0–4	Bolton Wanderers	Atherton
19:30 BST		Report	Thomason 72'; Delfouneso 74', 90+4'; Darcy 90+3'	Stadium: Alder House

17 July 2021 Friendly	FC United of Manchester	1–1	Bolton Wanderers	Moston
15:00 BST	Trialist 46'		Johnston 90'	Stadium: Broadhurst Park; Referee: Leigh Doughty

20 July 2021 Friendly	Preston North End	0–1	Bolton Wanderers	Leyland
19:00 BST		Report	Jones 51'	Stadium: County Ground

21 July 2021 Friendly	Bamber Bridge	P–P	Bolton Wanderers XI	Bamber Bridge
19:30 BST				Stadium: Sir Tom Finney Stadium
Note: Match was cancelled due to members of the development staff self-isolating from COVID-19.

24 July 2021 Friendly	Barrow	0–1	Bolton Wanderers	Barrow-in-Furness
15:00 BST		Report	Afolayan 40'	Stadium: Progression Solicitors Stadium; Attendance: 1,918; Referee: Marc Edwards

27 July 2021 Harold Taylor Memorial Trophy	Chorley	0–1	Bolton Wanderers XI	Chorley
19:30 BST		Report	Senior 26'	Stadium: Victory Park

31 July 2021 Friendly	Bolton Wanderers XI	1–1	Norwich City U-18	Lostock
10:30 BST	70'	Report	Thorn	Stadium: Eddie Davies Academy; Attendance: Behind closed doors

31 July 2021 Friendly	Bolton Wanderers XI	v	Norwich City U-23	Lostock
12:00 BST				Stadium: Eddie Davies Academy; Attendance: Behind closed doors

31 July 2021 Friendly	Bolton Wanderers	2–2	Blackburn Rovers	Bolton
15:00 BST	Johnston 28'; Afolayan 51'	Report	Brereton 68', 72'	Stadium: University of Bolton Stadium; Attendance: 6,907

4 August 2021 Friendly	Chester	0–0	Bolton Wanderers XI	Chester
19:00 BST		Report		Stadium: Deva Stadium

== Mid-season friendlies ==
On 23 September, Bolton announced the first team would play a friendly against a team consisting of legendary Bolton players on 13 November to help raise money for Gethin Jones's Mother's recovery, as she had been diagnosed with Motor Neurone Disease. A quarter of the money raised would also go to former Bolton player Stephen Darby's charity Darby Rimmer MND Foundation, as he had also suffered from Motor Neurone Disease which had forced him to retire.

13 November 2021 Friendly	Bolton Wanderers	7–4	Bolton Wanderers All-Stars	Bolton
13:20	Thomason 34'; Delfouneso 37'; Amaechi 45'; Evatt 47', 57', 61'; Afolayan 65'	Report	Okocha 29' (pen.); Davies (yellow card) 32'; Eagles 50', 60'; McGinlay 80' (pen.)	Stadium: University of Bolton Stadium; Attendance: 13,187
Note: Match was 80 minutes.

== Competitions ==
=== EFL League One ===
==== League table ====
Pos	Team	Pld	W	D	L	GF	GA	GD	Pts	Promotion, qualification or relegation
5	Sunderland (O, P)	46	24	12	10	79	53	+26	84	Qualification for League One play-offs
6	Wycombe Wanderers	46	23	14	9	75	51	+24	83	Qualification for League One play-offs
7	Plymouth Argyle	46	23	11	12	68	48	+20	80	
8	Oxford United	46	22	10	14	82	59	+23	76	
9	Bolton Wanderers	46	21	10	15	74	57	+17	73	
10	Portsmouth	46	20	13	13	68	51	+17	73	
11	Ipswich Town	46	18	16	12	67	46	+21	70	
12	Accrington Stanley	46	17	10	19	61	80	−19	61	
13	Charlton Athletic	46	17	8	21	55	59	−4	59	

Source: EFL Official Website
Rules for classification: 1) Points; 2) Goal difference; 3) Number of goals scored; 4) Head-to-head results; 5) Wins; 6) Away goals; 7) Penalty points based on yellow and red cards received excluding the last four games of the season (sec 9.5); 8) 12-point sending off offences; 9) If the tie affects the automatic promotion or relegation places, a play-off game or games would be held between the two tied teams
(O) Play-off winners; (P) Promoted

==== Results summary ====
Overall								Home						Away					
Pld	W	D	L	GF	GA	GD	Pts	W	D	L	GF	GA	GD	W	D	L	GF	GA	GD
46	21	10	15	74	57	+17	73	12	7	4	45	26	+19	9	3	11	29	31	−2

Last updated: 30 April 2022.
Source: BBC

==== Results by matchday ====
Matchday	1	2	3	4	5	6	7	8	9	10	11	12	13	14	15	16	17	18	19	20	21	22	23	24	25	26	27	28	29	30	31	32	33	34	35	36	37	38	39	40	41	42	43	44	45	46
H/A	H	A	A	H	A	H	A	H	A	A	H	A	H	A	H	A	H	A	H	H	A	A	A	H	H	A	H	H	A	H	A	A	H	H	A	A	H	H	A	A	H	H	A	H	A	H
Result	D	D	W	W	L	D	W	L	L	W	W	L	L	L	D	L	W	L	W	D	L	L	L	L	W	W	W	W	D	W	W	L	W	W	L	W	D	L	W	D	D	D	W	W	W	W
Position	7	14	9	7	13	12	3	8	9	7	7	8	10	11	12	14	10	13	11	12	16	15	16	18	17	15	14	11	10	10	10	10	10	10	10	11	11	11	11	11	11	10	11	10	10	9

Updated to match(es) played on 30 April 2022. Source: 11v11 for league tables and fixtures
A = Away; H = Home; W = Win; D = Draw; L = Loss

==== Matches ====
The fixtures for the 2021–22 EFL League One season were released on 24 June and saw Bolton opening their campaign at home to Milton Keynes Dons on 7 August. The regular season will conclude on 30 April at home to Fleetwood Town.

Win Draw Loss Postponed

7 August 2021 1	Bolton Wanderers	3–3	Milton Keynes Dons	Bolton
15:00 BST	Sheehan 30'; Williams (yellow card) 32'; Bakayoko 67'; Baptiste 90+5'	Report	Eisa 22'; Twine 71'; Boateng 83'	Stadium: University of Bolton Stadium; Attendance: 16,087; Referee: Martin Coy

14 August 2021 2	AFC Wimbledon	3–3	Bolton Wanderers	Wimbledon
15:00 BST	Nightingale 20'; Tzanev (yellow card) 22'; Heneghan (yellow card) 62'; Guinness-Walker (yellow card) 65'; Pressley 74' (pen.); Mebude 75'; Assal (yellow card) 80'	Report	Doyle 23' (pen.); Sheehan 27', (yellow card) 35'; Afolayan 48'; Jones (yellow card) 53'	Stadium: Plough Lane; Attendance: 7,728; Referee: Peter Wright

17 August 2021 3	Lincoln City	0–1	Bolton Wanderers	Lincoln
19:45 BST	Jackson (yellow card) 71'	Report	Sarcevic 77'	Stadium: Sincil Bank; Attendance: 9,130; Referee: Sam Barrott

21 August 2021 4	Bolton Wanderers	2–1	Oxford United	Bolton
15:00 BST	Afolayan 45'; Doyle 63'	Report	Taylor 11', (yellow card) 39'; McGuane (yellow card) 85'; Forde (yellow card) 90+2'	Stadium: University of Bolton Stadium; Attendance: 15,073; Referee: Neil Hair

28 August 2021 5	Cambridge United	1–0	Bolton Wanderers	Cambridge
15:00 BST	Tracey 16'; Iredale (yellow card) 17'; Digby (yellow card) 38'; Hoolahan (yellow card) 54'; O'Neil (yellow card) 73'	Report	Williams (yellow card) 13'; Sarcevic (yellow card) 29'; Santos (yellow card) 88'	Stadium: Abbey Stadium; Attendance: 6,124; Referee: Tom Nield

6 September 2021 6	Bolton Wanderers	0–0	Burton Albion	Bolton
20:00 BST	Williams (yellow card) 36'; Johnston (yellow card) 90+5'	Report	Hamer (yellow card) 9'; Akins (yellow card) 19'; Brayford (yellow card) 69' (yellow-red card) 86'; Shaughnessy (yellow card) 80'	Stadium: University of Bolton Stadium; Attendance: 13,305; Referee: Josh Smith
Note: Live on Sky Sports

11 September 2021 7	Ipswich Town	2–5	Bolton Wanderers	Ipswich
15:00 BST	Bonne 5'; Vincent-Young (yellow card) 13'; Santos 30' (o.g.)	Report	Afolayan 10', 45+2'; Doyle 18' (pen.); Isgrove (yellow card) 20'; Jones (yellow card) 24'; Sheehan 47'; Johnston 57'	Stadium: Portman Road; Attendance: 19,267; Referee: Bobby Madley

18 September 2021 8	Bolton Wanderers	0–2	Rotherham United	Bolton
15:00 BST	Sheehan (yellow card) 64'; Williams (yellow card) 89'; Jones (yellow card) 90+5'	Report	Wood (yellow card) 6'; Wiles 18', 21'; Mattock (yellow card) 51'; Harding (yellow card) 79'	Stadium: University of Bolton Stadium; Attendance: 20,877; Referee: James Bell

25 September 2021 9	Sunderland	1–0	Bolton Wanderers	Sunderland
15:00 BST	Winchester 17'; O'Nien (yellow card) 45+3'	Report	Doyle (yellow card) 42'; Afolayan (yellow card) 69'; Santos (yellow card) 90+3'	Stadium: Stadium of Light; Attendance: 32,368; Referee: Sam Purkiss

28 September 2021 10	Charlton Athletic	1–4	Bolton Wanderers	Charlton
19:45 BST	Davison 12', (yellow card) 31'; Lavelle (yellow card) 20'	Report	Afolayan 43'; Lee 73', 81'; Jones (yellow card) 90'; Sarcevic 90+1'; Santos (yellow card) 90+8'	Stadium: The Valley; Attendance: 12,707; Referee: Lee Swabey

2 October 2021 11	Bolton Wanderers	2–1	Shrewsbury Town	Bolton
15:00 BST	Sarcevic 18'; Afolayan 23'; Santos (yellow card) 88'	Report	Leahy 89'; Bennett (yellow card) 90+6'	Stadium: University of Bolton Stadium; Attendance: 14,124; Referee: Marc Edwards

9 October 2021 12	Sheffield Wednesday	1–0	Bolton Wanderers	Sheffield
15:00 BST	Iorfa (yellow card) 28'; Gregory 66'; Shodipo (yellow card) 77'	Report	Jones (yellow card) 58'; Afolayan (yellow card) 65'	Stadium: Hillsborough Stadium; Attendance: 23,692; Referee: David Rock

16 October 2021 13	Bolton Wanderers	0–4	Wigan Athletic	Bolton
15:00 BST	Johnston (yellow card) 27'; Santos (yellow card) 64'; Thomason (yellow card) 87'	Report	Keane 6'; Cousins (yellow card) 48'; McClean 50', 81'; Lang (yellow card) 56', (goal) 65'; Pearce (yellow card) 77'; Massey (yellow card) 86'	Stadium: University of Bolton Stadium; Attendance: 20,892; Referee: Charles Breakspear

19 October 2021 14	Plymouth Argyle	3–0	Bolton Wanderers	Plymouth
19:45 BST	Galloway 6', (yellow card) 90+1'; Grant 15'; Broom 90+4'	Report	Bakayoko (yellow card) 12'; Afolayan (yellow card) 50'; Lee (yellow card) 54'	Stadium: Home Park; Attendance: 12,813; Referee: Keith Stroud

23 October 2021 15	Bolton Wanderers	2–2	Gillingham	Bolton
15:00 BST	Afolayan (yellow card) 71', (goal) 86'; Lee 90+1'	Report	Akinde 11'; Dempsey 14', (yellow card) 40'; Tucker (yellow card) 56'; O'Keefe (yellow card) 67'	Stadium: University of Bolton Stadium; Attendance: 13,807; Referee: Ben Toner

30 October 2021 16	Portsmouth	1–0	Bolton Wanderers	Milton
15:00 BST	Marquis 51'	Report		Stadium: Fratton Park; Attendance: 16,231; Referee: Craig Hicks

12 November 2021 17	Bolton Wanderers	2–0	Crewe Alexandra	Bolton
20:00 GMT	Kachunga (yellow card) 2'; Sheehan 50' (pen.); Bakayoko 54'	Report	Mandron (yellow card) 10'; Long (yellow card) 28'; Gomes (yellow card) 35'; Offord (yellow card) 90+1'	Stadium: University of Bolton Stadium; Attendance: 13,804; Referee: James Bell

20 November 2021 18	Wycombe Wanderers	1–0	Bolton Wanderers	High Wycombe
15:00 GMT	Tafazolli (yellow card) 13'; Vokes 72'; Stockdale (yellow card) 90+4'	Report		Stadium: Adams Park; Attendance: 5,710; Referee: James Oldham

23 November 2021 19	Bolton Wanderers	3–0	Doncaster Rovers	Bolton
20:00 GMT	Doyle 37'; Afolayan (yellow card) 39'; Kachunga 45+4'; Thomason 57'	Report	Olowu (red card) 43'	Stadium: University of Bolton Stadium; Attendance: 12,501; Referee: Steve Martin

27 November 2021 20	Bolton Wanderers	2–2	Cheltenham Town	Bolton
15:00 GMT	Amaechi 26'; Thomason (yellow card) 30'; Kachunga 58'	Report	May 14', 45+4'; Crowley (yellow card) 45+3'	Stadium: University of Bolton Stadium; Attendance: 13,145; Referee: Ross Joyce

7 December 2021 21	Fleetwood Town	3–0	Bolton Wanderers	Fleetwood
19:45 GMT	Garner 6'; Hayes (yellow card) 26'; McLaughlin (yellow card) 35'; Biggins 77', 79'	Report	Santos (red card) 73'	Stadium: Highbury Stadium; Attendance: 3,279; Referee: Seb Stockbridge

11 December 2021 22	Accrington Stanley	1–0	Bolton Wanderers	Accrington
15:00 GMT	Leigh 20'; Amankwah (yellow card) 45'; Coyle (yellow card) 50'; Savin (yellow card) 63'	Report		Stadium: Wham Stadium; Attendance: 4,546; Referee: Alan Young

18 December 2021	Bolton Wanderers	P–P	Wycombe Wanderers	Bolton
15:00 GMT				Stadium: University of Bolton Stadium
Note: Match was postponed due to a number of COVID-19 cases within the Bolton Wanderers camp.

26 December 2021	Bolton Wanderers	P–P	Morecambe	Bolton
15:00 GMT				Stadium: University of Bolton Stadium
Note: Match was postponed due to a number of COVID-19 cases within the Bolton Wanderers camp.

29 December 2021	Burton Albion	P–P	Bolton Wanderers	Burton upon Trent
19:45 GMT				Stadium: Pirelli Stadium
Note: Match was postponed due to a number of COVID-19 cases within the Bolton Wanderers camp.

1 January 2022 23	Rotherham United	2–1	Bolton Wanderers	Rotherham
15:00 GMT	Smith 40', 74'; Ogbene (yellow card) 53'; Edmonds-Green (yellow card) 84'	Report	Doyle 42'; Afolayan (yellow card) 43'; Dixon (yellow card) 68'; Santos (yellow card) 83'	Stadium: AESSEAL New York Stadium; Attendance: 9,736; Referee: Geoff Eltringham

8 January 2022	Bolton Wanderers	P–P	Cambridge United	Bolton
15:00 GMT				Stadium: University of Bolton Stadium
Note: Match was postponed due to Cambridge United's progression in the FA Cup.

11 January 2022 24	Bolton Wanderers	0–2	Wycombe Wanderers	Bolton
20:00 GMT		Report	Hanlan 35'; McCleary (yellow card) 45+7'; Tafazolli (yellow card) 45+13'; Grimmer 52'; Scowen (yellow card) 57'; Jacobson (yellow card) 67'	Stadium: University of Bolton Stadium; Attendance: 12,584; Referee: Peter Wright

15 January 2022 25	Bolton Wanderers	2–0	Ipswich Town	Bolton
15:00 GMT	Williams (yellow card) 13'; Lee 74'; Santos (yellow card) 80'; Afolayan 81'	Report	Walton (yellow card) 40'; Norwood (yellow card) 58'; Burns (yellow card) 73'	Stadium: University of Bolton Stadium; Attendance: 14,020; Referee: Bobby Madley

22 January 2022 26	Shrewsbury Town	0–1	Bolton Wanderers	Shrewsbury
15:00 GMT	Pennington (yellow card) 32'; Ogbeta (yellow card) 67'	Report	Charles 89', (yellow card) 90'	Stadium: Montgomery Waters Meadow; Attendance: 8,027; Referee: Charles Breakspear

29 January 2022 27	Bolton Wanderers	6–0	Sunderland	Bolton
15:00 GMT	Charles 19', 51'; Afolayan 42'; Lee 59'; Bakayoko (yellow card) 84'; Batth 85' (o.g.); John 88'	Report	Gooch (yellow card) 81'	Stadium: University of Bolton Stadium; Attendance: 20,059; Referee: Steve Martin

1 February 2022 28	Bolton Wanderers	2–0	Cambridge United	Bolton
20:00 GMT	Bakayoko 39'; Afolayan 70'; Williams (yellow card) 87'	Report	Mitov (yellow card) 42'	Stadium: University of Bolton Stadium; Attendance: 13,334; Referee: Andy Haines

5 February 2022 29	Morecambe	1–1	Bolton Wanderers	Morecambe
15:00 GMT	Stockton 73'; Smith (yellow card) 86'	Report	Johnston (yellow card) 45'; Santos (red card) 69'; Bakayoko 90+14'	Stadium: Mazuma Stadium; Attendance: 5,617; Referee: Ross Joyce

8 February 2022 30	Bolton Wanderers	2–1	Charlton Athletic	Bolton
20:00 GMT	Charles 10'; Jones (yellow card) 33'; John (yellow card) 55'; Aimson 83'; Bakayoko (yellow card) 90+5'	Report	Washington (yellow card) 40'; Gilbey (yellow card) 42'; Pearce (yellow card) 53'; Aneke 76'	Stadium: University of Bolton Stadium; Attendance: 13,523; Referee: Ben Toner

12 February 2022 31	Oxford United	2–3	Bolton Wanderers	Oxford
15:00 GMT	Bodin 9', 32'; Moore (yellow card) 26'; Kane (yellow card) 70'; Seddon (yellow card) 76'	Report	John 10'; Fossey 38'; Afolayan (yellow card) 74'; Bakayoko 86'	Stadium: Kassam Stadium; Attendance: 10,027; Referee: Gavin Ward

15 February 2022 32	Burton Albion	3–1	Bolton Wanderers	Burton upon Trent
19:45 GMT	Powell 11'; Brayford 14', 18'; Mancienne (yellow card) 55'	Report	Williams (yellow card) 68'; Charles 90+4'	Stadium: Pirelli Stadium; Attendance: 3,487; Referee: Scott Oldham

19 February 2022 33	Bolton Wanderers	4–0	AFC Wimbledon	Bolton
15:00 GMT	Böðvarsson 36'; Afolayan (yellow card) 42', (goal) 56'; Charles 67'; Bakayoko 87'	Report	Marsh (yellow card) 12'	Stadium: University of Bolton Stadium; Attendance: 14,537; Referee: Rebecca Welch

22 February 2022 34	Bolton Wanderers	3–1	Lincoln City	Bolton
20:00 GMT	Johnston 53'; Bakayoko (yellow card) 68' (goal) 83'; Sadlier 76'; Charles (yellow card) 88'; Williams (yellow card) 90'	Report	Bramall 65'	Stadium: University of Bolton Stadium; Attendance: 13,841; Referee: Sam Allison

26 February 2022 35	Milton Keynes Dons	2–0	Bolton Wanderers	Denbigh
15:00 GMT	Eisa 17'; Twine 74'	Report	Morley (yellow card) 34'	Stadium: Stadium MK; Attendance: 10,388; Referee: Seb Stockbridge

5 March 2022 36	Gillingham	0–3	Bolton Wanderers	Gillingham
15:00 GMT	Phillips (yellow card) 57' (yellow-red card) 61'	Report	Morley 31'; John 65'; Williams (yellow card) 73'; Böðvarsson 86'	Stadium: Priestfield Stadium; Attendance: 5,109; Referee: Craig Hicks

8 March 2022 37	Bolton Wanderers	1–1	Morecambe	Bolton
20:00 GMT	Böðvarsson 90+4'	Report	Gibson (yellow card) 35'; Stockton 41' (yellow card) 90+6'; Connolly (yellow card) 73'; Bedeau (yellow card) 90+6'	Stadium: University of Bolton Stadium; Attendance: 14,559; Referee: Chris Sarginson

12 March 2022 38	Bolton Wanderers	0–1	Plymouth Argyle	Bolton
15:00 GMT		Report	Gillesphey 43'	Stadium: University of Bolton Stadium; Attendance: 16,078; Referee: Robert Lewis

19 March 2022 39	Crewe Alexandra	0–1	Bolton Wanderers	Crewe
15:00 GMT	Johnson (yellow card) 34'	Report	Afolayan (yellow card) 34'; Bakayoko 90'	Stadium: Gresty Road; Attendance: 5,985; Referee: Sam Purkiss

26 March 2022	Bolton Wanderers	P–P	Portsmouth	Bolton
15:00 GMT				Stadium: University of Bolton Stadium
Note: Match was postponed due to both teams having players called up to play international football.

2 April 2022 40	Wigan Athletic	1–1	Bolton Wanderers	Wigan
12:30 GMT	McClean 7', (yellow card) 17'	Report	Santos (yellow card) 66'; Böðvarsson 83'	Stadium: DW Stadium; Attendance: 15,279; Referee: Sam Barrott

5 April 2022 41	Bolton Wanderers	1–1	Portsmouth	Bolton
20:00 GMT	Dempsey (yellow card) 38'; Aimson (yellow card) 49'; Sadlier 77' (pen.)	Report	O'Brien 50'	Stadium: University of Bolton Stadium; Attendance: 13,809; Referee: Marc Edwards

9 April 2022 42	Bolton Wanderers	1–1	Sheffield Wednesday	Bolton
15:00 GMT	Johnston (yellow card) 30'; Jones (yellow card) 36'; Gordon (yellow card) 79'; Kachunga (yellow card) 89'; Williams 90'	Report	Dean (yellow card) 43'; Storey 66'; Hunt (yellow card) 89'	Stadium: University of Bolton Stadium; Attendance: 19,164; Referee: Carl Brook

15 April 2022 43	Doncaster Rovers	1–2	Bolton Wanderers	Doncaster
15:00 GMT	Odubeko 77'; Galbraith (yellow card) 84'; Williams (yellow card) 90+5'	Report	Williams (yellow card) 7'; Thomason (yellow card) 26'; Bakayoko (yellow card) 29' (goal) 47'; Johnston (yellow card) 71'; Sadlier 78'	Stadium: Eco-Power Stadium; Attendance: 8,668; Referee: James Oldham

18 April 2022 44	Bolton Wanderers	3–1	Accrington Stanley	Bolton
15:00 GMT	Afolayan (yellow card) 29', (goal) 42'; John (yellow card) 45+3'; Amaechi (yellow card) 65'; Böðvarsson 69', 89'; Williams (yellow card) 70'	Report	Clark (yellow card) 41'; McConville (yellow card) 45+3'; Baghuelou (yellow card) 45+5', (goal) 50'; Conneely (yellow card) 76'; Longelo (red card) 82'	Stadium: University of Bolton Stadium; Attendance: 19,098; Referee: Thomas Bramall

23 April 2022 45	Cheltenham Town	1–2	Bolton Wanderers	Cheltenham
15:00 GMT	Lloyd (yellow card) 52'; Bonds (yellow card) 72'; Ramsey 89'	Report	Sadlier 57'; Bakayoko 76' (pen.)	Stadium: Jonny-Rocks Stadium; Attendance: 5,228; Referee: Neil Hair

30 April 2022 46	Bolton Wanderers	4–2	Fleetwood Town	Bolton
12:30 GMT	Charles 37', 86'; John 53'; Böðvarsson 90+6'	Report	Baggley 17'; Boyle (yellow card) 42'; Garner 79', (yellow card) 82'	Stadium: University of Bolton Stadium; Attendance: 16,886; Referee: Martin Coy

=== FA Cup ===
Bolton enter the FA Cup at the first round stage, along with all other League One and League Two clubs and were drawn at home to Stockport County.

7 November 2021 First round	Bolton Wanderers	2–2	Stockport County	Bolton
15:00 GMT	Isgrove (yellow card) 11'; Doyle 33'; Kachunga 36', (yellow card) 68'; Santos (yellow card) 78'	Report	Quigley 23'; Whitfield 45+2'; Madden (yellow card) 82'	Stadium: University of Bolton Stadium; Attendance: 11,183; Referee: Chris Sarginson

17 November 2021 First round replay	Stockport County	5–3	Bolton Wanderers	Stockport
19:45 GMT	Madden 24' (pen.), (yellow card) 33'; Quigley 45', 95'; Palmer 85'; Crankshaw 119', (yellow card) 120+1'	Report	Kachunga 2', (yellow card) 88'; Palmer 6' (o.g.); Bakayoko 28'; Sheehan (yellow card) 34'; Isgrove (yellow card) 81'; Amaechi (yellow card) 102'	Stadium: Edgeley Park; Attendance: 10,084; Referee: Sam Barrott

=== EFL Cup ===
Bolton entered the EFL Cup at the first round stage, along with all other League One and League Two club and the majority of Championship clubs. The draw was made on 24 June and saw Bolton face Barnsley in the first round. The tie took place on 10 August and after a goalless draw Bolton won on penalties. This marked the first time in four seasons that Bolton have made it past the first round. They were then drawn away to Wigan Athletic in the second round.

Win Draw Loss

10 August 2021 First round	Bolton Wanderers	0–0 (5–4 p)	Barnsley	Bolton
20:00 BST	Jones (yellow card) 68'	Report	Benson (yellow card) 13'; Moon (yellow card) 46'; Kane (yellow card) 82'	Stadium: University of Bolton Stadium; Attendance: 7,147; Referee: Ollie Yates
	Penalties
	Sarcevic (penalty scored); Isgrove (penalty scored); Bakayoko (penalty scored); Kachunga (penalty scored); Sheehan (penalty scored)		Benson (penalty scored); Kane (penalty scored); Helik (penalty scored); Williams (penalty scored); Cole (penalty missed)

24 August 2021 Second round	Wigan Athletic	0–0 (5–4 p)	Bolton Wanderers	Wigan
19:45 BST	Smith (yellow card) 38'; Darikwa (yellow card) 41'; McClean (yellow card) 43'; Power (yellow card) 44'; Pearce (yellow card) 60'	Report	Kachunga (yellow card) 45+1'; Afolayan (yellow card) 75'; Lee (yellow card) 86'	Stadium: DW Stadium; Attendance: 11,660; Referee: Thomas Brammall
	Penalties
	Power (penalty scored); Aasgaard (penalty scored); Jordan Jones (penalty missed); Naylor (penalty scored); Humphrys (penalty scored); Jamie Jones (penalty scored)		Doyle (penalty scored); Sarcevic (penalty scored); Lee (penalty missed); Afolayan (penalty scored); Sheehan (penalty scored); Delfouneso (penalty missed)

=== EFL Trophy ===
On 23 June Bolton were drawn into Group D in the Northern section alongside Rochdale and Port Vale. The day after Liverpool U-21's completed the group. In the knock-out stages, Bolton were drawn away to Hartlepool United.

Pos	Div	Team	Pld	W	PW	PL	L	GF	GA	GD	Pts	Qualification
1	L1	Bolton Wanderers	3	3	0	0	0	10	3	+7	9	Advance to Round 2
2	L2	Port Vale	3	2	0	0	1	8	3	+5	6	Advance to Round 2
3	L2	Rochdale	3	1	0	0	2	4	4	0	3	
4	ACA	Liverpool U21	3	0	0	0	3	1	13	−12	0	

Source: EFL.com

31 August 2021 Group game 1	Bolton Wanderers	3–2	Port Vale	Bolton
19:00 BST	Doyle 28'; Delfouneso 54', (yellow card) 67'; Santos (yellow card) 75'; Afolayan 77'; Baptiste (yellow card) 81'; Brockbank (yellow card) 90'	Report	Conlon 35'; Amoo 43'	Stadium: University of Bolton Stadium; Attendance: 2,926; Referee: Scott Oldham

5 October 2021 Group game 2	Bolton Wanderers	4–1	Liverpool U21s	Bolton
19:00 BST	Delfouneso 28'; Bakayoko 58', 81' (pen.); Quansah 66' (o.g.)	Report	Dixon-Bonner 72'	Stadium: University of Bolton Stadium; Attendance: 2,299; Referee: Andy Haines

2 November 2021 Group game 3	Rochdale	0–3	Bolton Wanderers	Rochdale
19:00 GMT	Cashman (yellow card) 4'	Report	Afolayan 16'; John 19'; Doyle 45+1' (pen.)	Stadium: Crown Oil Arena; Attendance: 1,116; Referee: Andrew Kitchen

30 November 2021 Second round	Bolton Wanderers	1–0	Fleetwood Town	Bolton
19:00 GMT	Lee 34'	Report	Biggins (yellow card) 54'; Clark (yellow card) 56'; Teale (yellow card) 63'	Stadium: University of Bolton Stadium; Attendance: 1,773; Referee: Benjamin Speedie

4 January 2022 Third round	Hartlepool United	1–0	Bolton Wanderers	Hartlepool
19:00 GMT	Grey (yellow card) 51'; Daly 84'	Report	Thomason (yellow card) 76'; Santos (yellow card) 82'	Stadium: Suit Direct Stadium; Attendance: 2,529; Referee: Anthony Backhouse

== Statistics ==
As of match played 30 April 2022

No.	Pos	Nat	Player	Total		League One		FA Cup		EFL Cup		EFL Trophy	
No.	Pos	Nat	Player	Apps	Goals	Apps	Goals	Apps	Goals	Apps	Goals	Apps	Goals
Goalkeepers
12	GK	(England) ENG	Joel Dixon	29	0	23+0	0	2+0	0	1+0	0	3+0	0
19	GK	(England) ENG	James Trafford	22	0	22+0	0	0+0	0	0+0	0	0+0	0
Defenders
2	DF	(Australia) AUS	Gethin Jones	31	0	28+1	0	0+0	0	1+1	0	0+0	0
3	DF	(Wales) WAL	Declan John	44	5	38+1	4	2+0	0	0+0	0	3+0	1
5	DF	(Portugal) POR	Ricardo Santos	43	0	37+0	0	2+0	0	1+0	0	3+0	0
6	DF	(Scotland) SCO	George Johnston	48	2	38+5	2	1+0	0	2+0	0	2+0	0
15	DF	(England) ENG	Will Aimson	28	1	22+3	1	0+1	0	0+0	0	2+0	0
27	DF	(England) ENG	Alex Baptiste	18	1	6+6	1	1+0	0	1+0	0	4+0	0
29	DF	(Guyana) GUY	Liam Gordon	21	0	10+3	0	0+2	0	2+0	0	3+1	0
34	DF	(England) ENG	Adam Senior	2	0	2+0	0	0+0	0	0+0	0	0+0	0
Midfielders
4	MF	(Wales) WAL	MJ Williams	44	1	39+1	1	1+0	0	1+0	0	2+0	0
8	MF	(Wales) WAL	Josh Sheehan	20	4	12+3	4	1+0	0	1+1	0	2+0	0
14	MF	(England) ENG	Xavier Amaechi	12	1	2+8	1	0+1	0	0+0	0	1+0	0
16	MF	(England) ENG	Aaron Morley	21	1	21+0	1	0+0	0	0+0	0	0+0	0
18	MF	(England) ENG	Andrew Tutte	1	0	0+0	0	0+0	0	0+0	0	1+0	0
20	MF	(England) ENG	Kieran Lee	30	6	19+6	5	2+0	0	2+0	0	1+0	1
22	MF	(Republic of Ireland) IRL	Kieran Sadlier	18	4	8+10	4	0+0	0	0+0	0	0+0	0
23	MF	(Wales) WAL	Lloyd Isgrove	24	0	12+6	0	2+0	0	1+0	0	3+0	0
25	MF	(England) ENG	George Thomason	21	1	9+4	1	2+0	0	1+0	0	5+0	0
32	MF	(England) ENG	Kyle Dempsey	11	0	5+6	0	0+0	0	0+0	0	0+0	0
42	MF	(England) ENG	Matthew Tweedley	1	0	0+0	0	0+0	0	0+0	0	0+1	0
49	MF	(England) ENG	Arran Pettifer	2	0	0+0	0	0+0	0	0+0	0	0+2	0
Forwards
9	FW	(Iceland) ISL	Jón Daði Böðvarsson	21	7	10+11	7	0+0	0	0+0	0	0+0	0
10	FW	(Northern Ireland) NIR	Dion Charles	24	8	21+2	8	0+0	0	0+0	0	1+0	0
11	FW	(Sierra Leone) SLE	Amadou Bakayoko	37	13	17+15	10	1+1	1	0+1	0	0+2	2
17	FW	(England) ENG	Oladapo Afolayan	51	14	38+6	12	2+0	0	1+0	0	3+1	2
24	FW	(Democratic Republic of the Congo) COD	Elias Kachunga	41	4	15+17	2	2+0	2	1+1	0	4+1	0
48	FW	(England) ENG	Mitchell Henry	4	0	0+0	0	0+0	0	0+0	0	0+4	0
Player(s) who left the club
1	GK	(Scotland) SCO	Matt Gilks	4	0	1+0	0	0+0	0	1+0	0	2+0	0
9	FW	(Republic of Ireland) IRL	Eoin Doyle	28	8	20+1	5	1+0	1	1+1	0	3+1	2
10	MF	(England) ENG	Antoni Sarcevic	17	3	13+1	3	0+0	0	1+1	0	0+1	0
13	DF	(United States) USA	Marlon Fossey	16	1	15+0	1	0+0	0	0+0	0	1+0	0
21	DF	(England) ENG	Harry Brockbank	7	0	2+2	0	0+0	0	1+0	0	2+0	0
28	MF	(Montserrat) MSR	Brandon Comley	1	0	0+0	0	0+0	0	0+0	0	1+0	0
Player(s) out on loan
7	FW	(England) ENG	Nathan Delfouneso	20	2	2+9	0	0+2	0	2+0	0	3+2	2
26	DF	(England) ENG	Liam Edwards	1	0	0+0	0	0+0	0	0+0	0	0+1	0
30	MF	(England) ENG	Ronan Darcy	1	0	0+1	0	0+0	0	0+0	0	0+0	0

=== Goals record ===
As of match played 30 April 2022

Rank	No.	Nat.	Po.	Name	League One	FA Cup	EFL Cup	EFL Trophy	Total
1	17	(England)	LW	Oladapo Afolayan	12	0	0	2	14
2	11	(Sierra Leone)	CF	Amadou Bakayoko	10	1	0	2	13
3	10	(Northern Ireland)	CF	Dion Charles	8	0	0	0	8
3	-	(Republic of Ireland)	CF	Eoin Doyle	5	1	0	2	8
4	9	(Iceland)	CF	Jón Daði Böðvarsson	7	0	0	0	7
5	20	(England)	CM	Kieran Lee	5	0	0	1	6
6	3	(Wales)	LB	Declan John	4	0	0	1	5
7	8	(Wales)	CM	Josh Sheehan	4	0	0	0	4
7	22	(Republic of Ireland)	LW	Kieran Sadlier	4	0	0	0	4
7	24	(Democratic Republic of the Congo)	CF	Elias Kachunga	2	2	0	0	4
8	-	(England)	CM	Antoni Sarcevic	3	0	0	0	3
9	6	(Scotland)	CB	George Johnston	2	0	0	0	2
9	7	(England)	CF	Nathan Delfouneso	0	0	0	2	2
10	4	(Wales)	CM	MJ Williams	1	0	0	0	1
10	13	(United States)	RB	Marlon Fossey	1	0	0	0	1
10	14	(England)	RW	Xavier Amaechi	1	0	0	0	1
10	15	(England)	CB	Will Aimson	1	0	0	0	1
10	16	(England)	CM	Aaron Morley	1	0	0	0	1
10	25	(England)	CM	George Thomason	1	0	0	0	1
10	27	(England)	CB	Alex Baptiste	1	0	0	0	1
Own Goals					1	1	0	1	3
Total					74	5	0	11	90

=== Disciplinary record ===
As of match played 18 April 2022

Rank	No.	Nat.	Po.	Name	League One			FA Cup			EFL Cup			EFL Trophy			Total		
Rank	No.	Nat.	Po.	Name	Booked	(yellow card) (yellow-red card)	Sent off (straight red)	Booked	(yellow card) (yellow-red card)	Sent off (straight red)	Booked	(yellow card) (yellow-red card)	Sent off (straight red)	Booked	(yellow card) (yellow-red card)	Sent off (straight red)	Booked	(yellow card) (yellow-red card)	Sent off (straight red)
1	5	(Portugal)	CB	Ricardo Santos	8	0	2	1	0	0	0	0	0	2	0	0	11	0	2
2	4	(Wales)	CM	MJ Williams	11	0	0	0	0	0	0	0	0	0	0	0	11	0	0
2	17	(England)	LW	Oladapo Afolayan	10	0	0	0	0	0	1	0	0	0	0	0	11	0	0
3	2	(Australia)	RB	Gethin Jones	7	0	0	0	0	0	1	0	0	0	0	0	8	0	0
4	6	(Scotland)	CB	George Johnston	5	0	0	0	0	0	0	0	0	0	0	0	5	0	0
4	11	(Sierra Leone)	CF	Amadou Bakayoko	5	0	0	0	0	0	0	0	0	0	0	0	5	0	0
4	24	(Democratic Republic of the Congo)	CF	Elias Kachunga	2	0	0	2	0	0	1	0	0	0	0	0	5	0	0
5	25	(England)	CM	George Thomason	3	0	0	0	0	0	0	0	0	1	0	0	4	0	0
6	8	(Wales)	CM	Josh Sheehan	2	0	0	1	0	0	0	0	0	0	0	0	3	0	0
6	23	(Wales)	RW	Lloyd Isgrove	1	0	0	2	0	0	0	0	0	0	0	0	3	0	0
7	3	(Wales)	LB	Declan John	2	0	0	0	0	0	0	0	0	0	0	0	2	0	0
7	10	(Northern Ireland)	CF	Dion Charles	2	0	0	0	0	0	0	0	0	0	0	0	2	0	0
7	14	(England)	RW	Xavier Amaechi	1	0	0	1	0	0	0	0	0	0	0	0	2	0	0
7	20	(England)	CM	Kieran Lee	1	0	0	0	0	0	1	0	0	0	0	0	2	0	0
8	7	(England)	CF	Nathan Delfouneso	0	0	0	0	0	0	0	0	0	0	0	0	1	0	0
8	12	(England)	GK	Joel Dixon	1	0	0	0	0	0	0	0	0	0	0	0	1	0	0
8	15	(England)	CB	Will Aimson	1	0	0	0	0	0	0	0	0	0	0	0	1	0	0
8	16	(England)	CM	Aaron Morley	1	0	0	0	0	0	0	0	0	0	0	0	1	0	0
8	21	(England)	RB	Harry Brockbank	0	0	0	0	0	0	0	0	0	1	0	0	1	0	0
8	27	(England)	CB	Alex Baptiste	0	0	0	0	0	0	0	0	0	1	0	0	1	0	0
8	29	(Guyana)	LB	Liam Gordon	1	0	0	0	0	0	0	0	0	0	0	0	1	0	0
8	32	(England)	CM	Kyle Dempsey	1	0	0	0	0	0	0	0	0	0	0	0	1	0	0
8	-	(Republic of Ireland)	CF	Eoin Doyle	1	0	0	0	0	0	0	0	0	0	0	0	1	0	0
8	-	(England)	CM	Antoni Sarcevic	1	0	0	0	0	0	0	0	0	0	0	0	1	0	0
Total					67	0	2	7	0	0	4	0	0	6	0	0	84	0	2

== Transfers ==
=== Transfers in ===
Date	Position	Nationality	Name	From	Fee	Ref.
27 May 2021	LW	(England)	Oladapo Afolayan	(England) West Ham United	Free transfer	
11 June 2021	LB	(Wales)	Declan John	(Wales) Swansea City	Free transfer	
1 July 2021 (Note: The transfer was announced on 17 June, and would become official on 1 July once his Plymouth Argyle contract expired)	CB	(England)	Will Aimson	(England) Plymouth Argyle	Free transfer	
1 July 2021 (Note: The transfer was announced on 25 June, and would become official on 1 July once his Coventry City contract expired)	CF	(Sierra Leone)	Amadou Bakayoko	(England) Coventry City	Free transfer	
1 July 2021 (Note: The transfer was announced on 25 June, and would become official on 1 July once his Barrow contract expired)	GK	(England)	Joel Dixon	(England) Barrow	Free transfer	
1 July 2021 (Note: The transfer was announced on 4 June, and would become official on 1 July once his Feyenoord contract expired)	CB	(Scotland)	George Johnston	(Netherlands) Feyenoord	Free transfer	
1 July 2021 (Note: The transfer was announced on 7 June, and would become official on 1 July once his Newport County contract expired)	CM	(Wales)	Josh Sheehan	(Wales) Newport County	Free transfer	
6 August 2021	CF	(Democratic Republic of the Congo)	Elias Kachunga	(England) Sheffield Wednesday	Free transfer	
1 January 2022	CF	(Northern Ireland)	Dion Charles	(England) Accrington Stanley	Undisclosed (Note: The transfer was reported to be £320,000 by The Bolton News)	
11 January 2022	CM	(England)	Aaron Morley	(England) Rochdale	Undisclosed (Note: The transfer was reported to be around £100,000 by The Bolton News)	
20 January 2022	CF	(Iceland)	Jón Daði Böðvarsson	(England) Millwall	Free transfer	
28 January 2022	AM	(Republic of Ireland)	Kieran Sadlier	(England) Rotherham United	Undisclosed	
31 January 2022	CM	(England)	Kyle Dempsey	(England) Gillingham	Undisclosed (Note: The transfer was reported to be around £150,000 by The Bolton News)	

=== Loans in ===
Date from	Position	Nationality	Name	From	Date until	Ref.
28 June 2021	RW	(England)	Xavier Amaechi	(Germany) Hamburger SV	End of season	
3 January 2022	RB	(United States)	Marlon Fossey	(England) Fulham	18 March 2022	
13 January 2022	GK	(England)	James Trafford	(England) Manchester City	End of season	

=== Loans out ===
Date from	Position	Nationality	Name	To	Date until	Ref.
21 July 2021	CB	(Guyana)	Reiss Greenidge	(England) Barnet	End of season	
4 August 2021	GK	(England)	Luke Hutchinson	(England) Atherton Collieries	9 January 2022	
7 August 2021	GK	(England)	Matthew Alexander	(England) Lancaster City	23 November 2021	
16 August 2021	RW	(Romania)	Dennis Politic	(England) Port Vale	17 January 2022	
27 August 2021	CM	(England)	Ronan Darcy	(Norway) Sogndal	31 December 2021	
31 August 2021	CM	(Scotland)	Ali Crawford	(Scotland) St Johnstone	3 January 2022	
3 September 2021	LW	(England)	Jay Fitzmartin	(England) Stalybridge Celtic	30 December 2021	
1 October 2021	RB	(England)	Adam Senior	(England) Ashton United	12 December 2021	
16 October 2021	CB	(Austria)	Ryan Colvin	(England) Prescot Cables	3 December 2021	
12 November 2021	RB	(England)	Adam Senior	(England) York City	9 December 2021	
12 November 2021	CB	(England)	Liam Edwards	(England) Southport	End of season	
25 January 2022	RB	(England)	Adam Senior	(England) Chorley	3 March 2022	
31 January 2022	CF	(England)	Nathan Delfouneso	(England) Bradford City	End of season	
1 February 2022	CM	(England)	Ronan Darcy	(Scotland) Queen's Park	End of season	
4 February 2022	GK	(England)	Matthew Alexander	(England) Runcorn Linnets	End of season	
21 February 2022	RW	(England)	Jay Fitzmartin	(England) Stalybridge Celtic	21 March 2022	

=== Transfers out ===
Date	Position	Nationality	Name	To	Fee	Ref.
30 June 2021	MF	(Sweden)	Markus Assarsson		Released	
30 June 2021	CB	(Republic of Ireland)	Ryan Delaney	(England) Morecambe	Released	
30 June 2021	CF	(England)	Muhammadu Faal	(England) Enfield Town	Released	
30 June 2021	LW	(France)	Arthur Gnahoua	(England) Morecambe	Released	
30 June 2021	DM	(England)	Sonny Graham	(England) Trimpell & Bare Rangers	Released	
30 June 2021	RB	(England)	Jak Hickman	(Republic of Ireland) St Patrick's Athletic	Released	
30 June 2021	RM	(Wales)	Callum King-Harmes	(England) Hednesford Town	Released	
30 June 2021	LB	(England)	Jamie Mascoll	(England) Wealdstone	Released	
30 June 2021	CF	(England)	Shaun Miller	(England) Nantwich Town	Released	
30 June 2021	RB	(England)	Nathan Whalley	(England) Ashton Athletic	Released	
20 September 2021	MF	(England)	Kian Le Fondre	(England) Burnley	Undisclosed	
22 October 2021	CM	(England)	Antoni Sarcevic	(England) Stockport County	Free transfer	
3 November 2021	CM	(Montserrat)	Brandon Comley	(England) Dagenham & Redbridge	Released	
10 December 2021	CB	(Austria)	Ryan Colvin	(England) Prescot Cables	Free Transfer	
3 January 2022	CM	(Scotland)	Ali Crawford	(Scotland) St Johnstone	Undisclosed	
7 January 2022	CF	(Republic of Ireland)	Eoin Doyle	(Republic of Ireland) St Patrick's Athletic	Undisclosed	
10 January 2022	GK	(Scotland)	Matt Gilks	Retired	—N/a	
19 January 2022	RB	(England)	Harry Brockbank	(United States) El Paso Locomotive	Released	
21 January 2022	RM	(Romania)	Dennis Politic	(Italy) Cremonese	Undisclosed (Note: The transfer was reported to be around £50,000 by The Bolton News)	
January 2022	CF	(England)	Bright Amoateng		Released	
