= Senator Montford =

Senator Montford may refer to:

- Bill Montford (born 1947), Florida State Senate
- John T. Montford (born 1943), Texas State Senate

== See also ==
- Montford (disambiguation)
