= Ronan Darcy =

English footballer (born 2000)

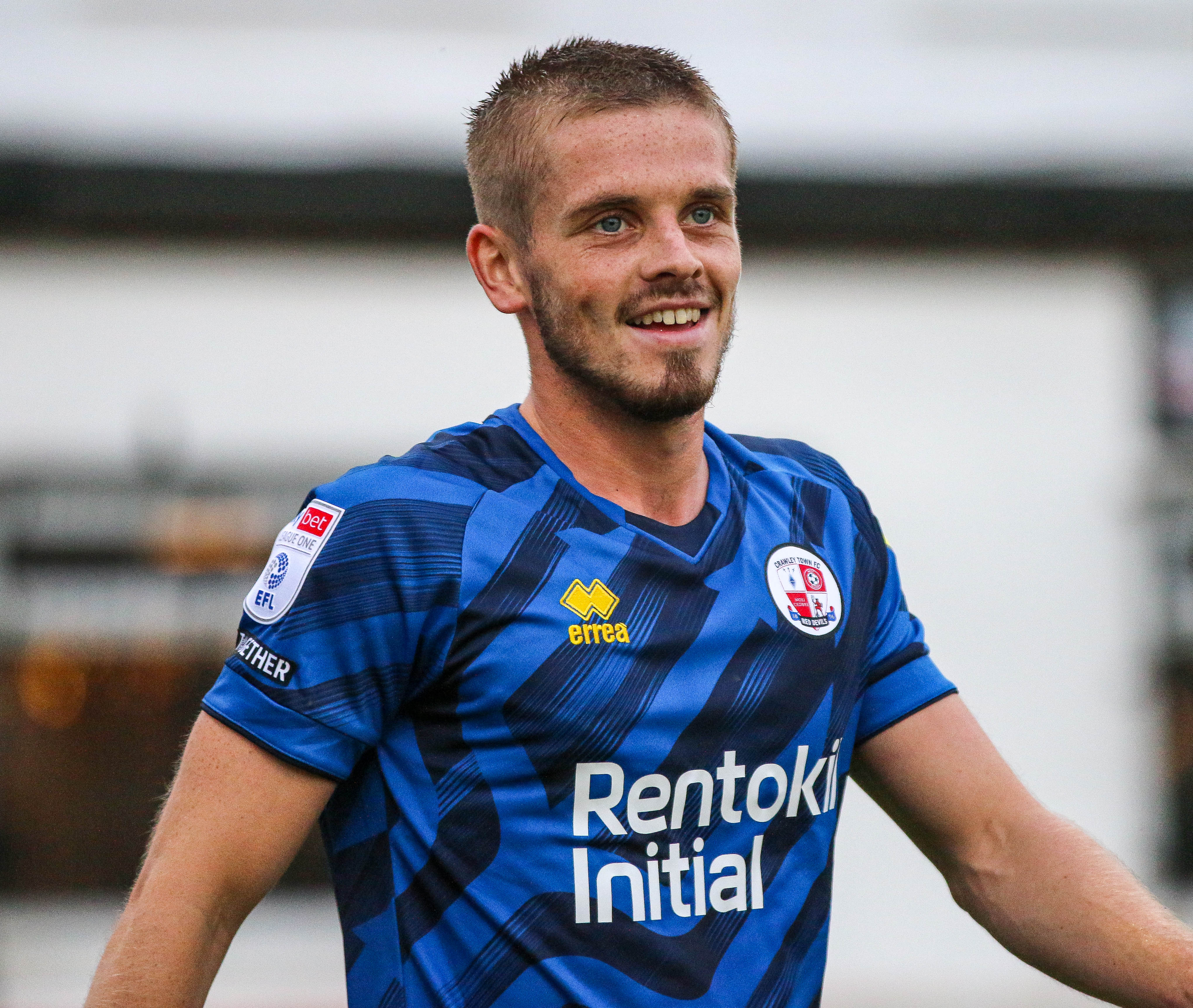
- Darcy playing for Crawley Town in July 2024

Personal information
- Full name: Ronan Thomas Darcy
- Date of birth: 4 November 2000 (age 26)
- Place of birth: Ormskirk, England
- Height: 6 ft 2 in (1.88 m)
- Positions: Attacking midfielder; winger

Team information
- Current team: Accrington Stanley
- Number: 49

Youth career
- 2009–2018: Bolton Wanderers

Senior career*
| Years | Team | Apps | (Gls) |
| 2018–2022 | Bolton Wanderers | 29 | (1) |
| 2018–2019 | → Skelmersdale United (loan) | 3 | (0) |
| 2021 | → Sogndal (loan) | 7 | (0) |
| 2021 | → Sogndal 2 (loan) | 1 | (0) |
| 2022 | → Queen's Park (loan) | 10 | (1) |
| 2022–2023 | Swindon Town | 43 | (4) |
| 2023–2025 | Crawley Town | 66 | (6) |
| 2025–2026 | Wigan Athletic | 13 | (1) |
| 2025–2026 | → Chesterfield (loan) | 24 | (3) |
| 2026 | → Crawley Town (loan) | 13 | (0) |
| 2026– | Accrington Stanley | 2 | (0) |
- * Club domestic league appearances and goals as of 22 November 2026

Ronan Thomas Darcy (born 4 November 2000) is an English professional footballer who plays as an attacking midfielder or winger for club Accrington Stanley.

== Career ==
=== Bolton Wanderers ===
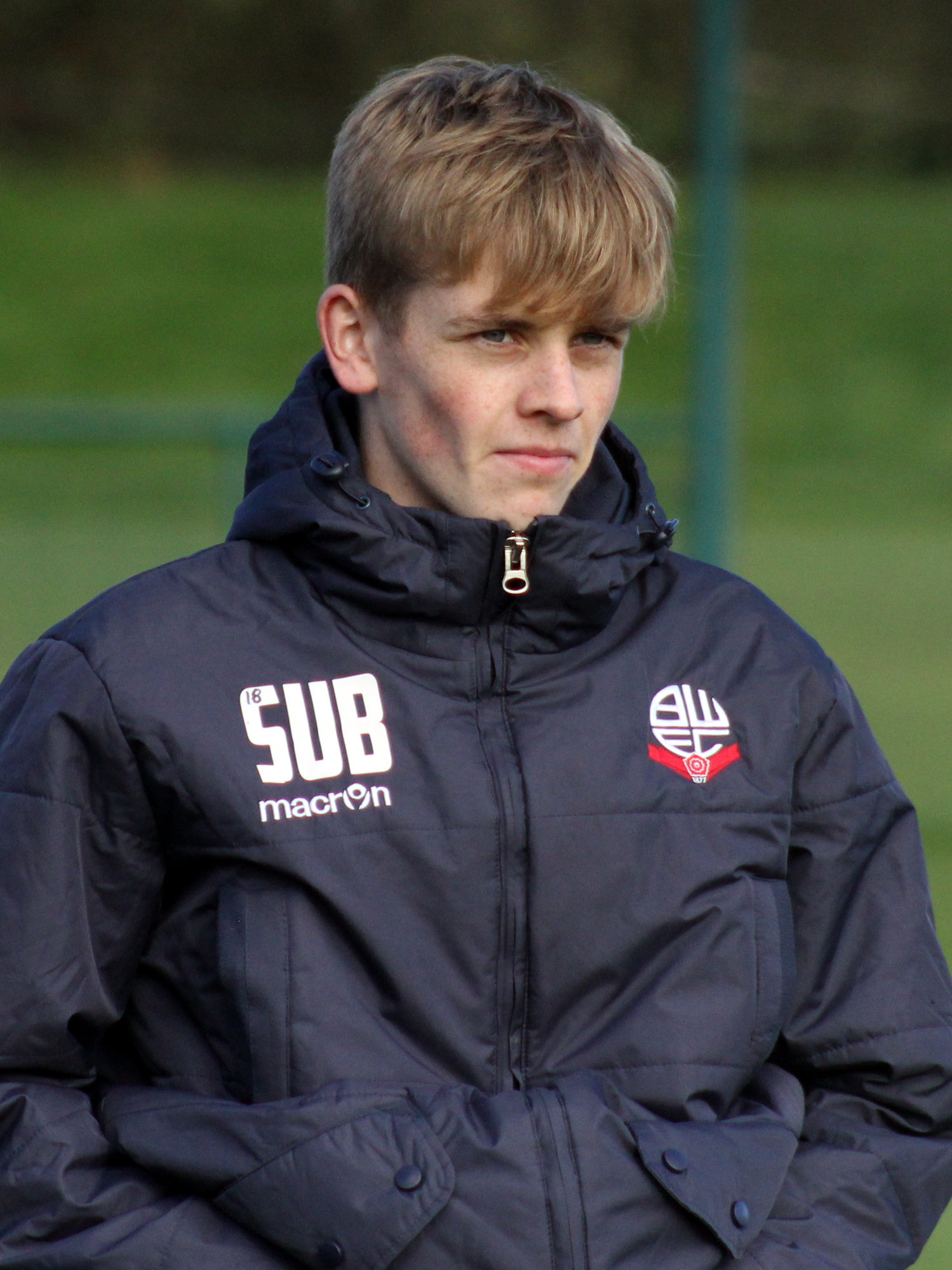
Darcy at Bolton Wanderers in November 2017

Darcy signed for the Bolton Wanderers Academy in 2008 at the age of 9. He spent the first half of the 2018–2019 season on loan at Skelmersdale United, where he played three times.

On 5 May 2019, Darcy made his Bolton debut, coming on as a second-half substitute for Craig Noone in Bolton's final game of the 2018–19 season away to Nottingham Forest. Darcy's scholarship contract was extended for a further year on 21 May 2019. He scored his first goal for Bolton Wanderers in a 5–2 defeat to Rochdale in the EFL Cup, and scored his first league goal for the club in a 5–1 defeat to Lincoln City. He played 22 matches during the 2019–20 season, which saw Bolton relegated to League Two. On 15 June 2020 Darcy signed his first professional contract, signing a new two-year contract with Bolton. During the 2020–21 season he played 11 matches as Bolton were promoted to League One.

On 17 August 2021, he signed a new one-year contract extension until 2023 and while it was initially reported that he had simultaneously joined Norwegian side Sogndal on loan until December, it wasn't until 27 August that the club confirmed the loan. The delay was due to work permit issues as Sogndal had not realised they had to apply for one, with English players no longer counting as EU players as a result of Brexit. His debut was delayed due to injury with Darcy making his debut on 22 September when he came on as a half time substitute in a 0–2 defeat against Åsane Fotball in the Norwegian Football Cup. Darcy helped Sogndal qualify for the play-offs, though they were eliminated in the first round by KFUM-Kameratene Oslo.

On 1 February 2022, Darcy joined Scottish League One club Queen's Park on loan until the end of the season. He made his debut four days later when he came on as a substitute in a 1–1 draw against Falkirk. Darcy scored his first goal on 22 February in a 3–3 draw against Celtic U-20s in the Glasgow Cup. His first league goal for Queen's Park came on 12 March, a late equaliser in a 1–1 draw against Alloa Athletic. During his loan spell he helped Queen's Park reach the finals of both the Glasgow Cup and the play-offs. Though they lost the Glasgow Cup final 3–1 to Rangers B, they won the play-off final 3–2 on aggregate against Airdrieonians earning them promotion to the Scottish Championship.

=== Swindon Town ===
On 13 July 2022, Darcy signed a two-year deal for EFL League Two side Swindon Town for an undisclosed fee, after completing a successful trial period at the club. He then scored his first goal for the Robins on 24 September, in a 1–2 away league victory against Grimsby Town.

=== Crawley Town ===
On 28 July 2023, Darcy signed for fellow League Two side Crawley Town on a two-year contract for an undisclosed fee, reuniting with Scott Lindsey who had signed him for Swindon. On 17 September He scored his first goal for Crawley against Tranmere Rovers in a 3-2 league victory.

Darcy appeared in all three of Crawley's League Two play-off matches at the end of the 2023–24 as Crawley were promoted to League One after a 2–0 victory over Crewe Alexandra in the final.

=== Wigan Athletic ===
On 30 January 2025, Darcy signed for League One side Wigan Athletic on a two-and-a-half year deal for an undisclosed fee.

On 7 September 2026, it was confirmed that he had left Wigan and was free to find a new club.

Ronan Darcy subsequently joined Accrington Stanley on November 7th 2026.

Chesterfield

On 5 August 2025, Darcy joined League Two side Chesterfield on a season-long loan deal. On 16 January 2026, Chesterfield confirmed that Darcy would have his loan spell cut short, and would return to parent club Wigan, after making 31 appearances in all competitions for the Spireites.

Crawley Town

On 21 January 2026, Crawley Town confirmed that Darcy had returned to the club on a loan deal running until the end of the season.

== Personal life ==
Born in England, Darcy is of Irish descent through his grandfather born in Limerick.

== Career statistics ==
As of 30 January 2025

Appearances and goals by club, season and competition
| Club | Season | League | | | National cup (Note: Includes FA Cup, Norwegian Football Cup, Scottish Cup) | | League cup (Note: Includes EFL Cup, Scottish League Cup) | | Other | | Total | |
| Club | Season | Division | Apps | Goals | Apps | Goals | Apps | Goals | Apps | Goals | Apps | Goals |
|---|---|---|---|---|---|---|---|---|---|---|---|---|
| Bolton Wanderers | 2018–19 | EFL Championship | 1 | 0 | 0 | 0 | 0 | 0 | 0 | 0 | 1 | 0 |
| Bolton Wanderers | 2019–20 | EFL League One | 19 | 1 | 0 | 0 | 1 | 1 | 2 (Note: Appearance(s) in the EFL Trophy.) | 0 | 22 | 2 |
| Bolton Wanderers | 2020–21 | EFL League Two | 8 | 0 | 1 | 0 | 0 | 0 | 2 | 0 | 11 | 0 |
| Bolton Wanderers | 2021–22 | EFL League One | 1 | 0 | 0 | 0 | 0 | 0 | 0 | 0 | 1 | 0 |
| Bolton Wanderers | Total | | 29 | 1 | 1 | 0 | 1 | 1 | 4 | 0 | 35 | 2 |
| Skelmersdale United (loan) | 2018–19 | NPL Division One North West | 3 | 0 | 0 | 0 | — | | 0 | 0 | 3 | 0 |
| Sogndal (loan) | 2021 | 1. divisjon | 7 | 0 | 1 | 0 | — | | 1 (Note: Appearance(s) in the 1. divisjon play-offs.) | 0 | 9 | 0 |
| Sogndal 2 (loan) | 2021 | 3. divisjon | 1 | 0 | — | | — | | — | | 1 | 0 |
| Queen's Park (loan) | 2021–22 | Scottish League One | 10 | 1 | — | | — | | 4 (Note: Appearance(s) in the Glasgow Cup.) | 1 | 14 | 2 |
| Swindon Town | 2022–23 | EFL League Two | 43 | 4 | 1 | 0 | 1 | 0 | 2 | 0 | 47 | 4 |
| Crawley Town | 2023–24 | EFL League Two | 45 | 5 | 0 | 0 | 1 | 0 | 6 (Note: Three appearances in EFL Trophy, three appearances and one goal in EFL League Two play-offs) | 1 | 52 | 6 |
| Crawley Town | 2024–25 | EFL League One | 21 | 1 | 2 | 0 | 0 | 0 | 2 | 1 | 25 | 2 |
| Crawley Town | Total | | 66 | 6 | 2 | 0 | 1 | 0 | 8 | 2 | 77 | 8 |
| Wigan Athletic | 2024–25 | EFL League One | 0 | 0 | — | | | | | | 0 | 0 |
| Career total | | | 159 | 12 | 5 | 0 | 3 | 1 | 19 | 3 | 186 | 16 |

== Honours ==
Bolton Wanderers

- EFL League Two third-place promotion: 2020–21

Queen's Park

- Scottish League One promotion play-offs: 2022
- Glasgow Cup runner-up: 2021–22

Crawley Town

- EFL League Two play-offs: 2024
