= Mitchell Henry (footballer) =

English footballer

Personal information
- Full name: Mitchell Devon Henry
- Date of birth: 2 September 2003 (age 23)
- Place of birth: Salford, England
- Position: Centre-forward

Team information
- Current team: Irlam

Youth career
- Bolton Wanderers

Senior career*
Years	Team	Apps	(Gls)
2020–2022	Bolton Wanderers	0	(0)
2022–	Irlam	27	(1)
- * Club domestic league appearances and goals as of 19:29, 25 February 2023 (UTC)

Mitchell Devon Henry (born 2 September 2003) is an English footballer who plays as a centre-forward for North West Counties Premier Division club Irlam.

== Playing career ==
After coming through the Bolton Wanderers Reserves Academy, Henry made his Bolton debut on 20 November 2020 in a 3–2 against Newcastle United U21 in the EFL Trophy, coming on as a late substitute for Shaun Miller. On 31 August 2021, he made his first appearance against a professional team in a 3–2 win against Port Vale also in the EFL Trophy when he came on as a late substitute for Elias Kachunga. On 30 April 2022, he announced he had not been offered a professional contract by Bolton and as such would be leaving when his contract expired on June 30. He signed for Irlam for the 2022–23 season.

== Statistics ==
As of match played 30 November 2021

Appearances and goals by club, season and competition
Club	Season	League			FA Cup		League Cup		Other		Total	
Club	Season	Division	Apps	Goals	Apps	Goals	Apps	Goals	Apps	Goals	Apps	Goals
Bolton Wanderers	2020–21	League Two	0	0	0	0	0	0	1 (Note: Appearance in EFL Trophy)	0	1	0
Bolton Wanderers	2021–22	League One	0	0	0	0	0	0	4	0	4	0
Bolton Wanderers	Total		0	0	0	0	0	0	5	0	5	0
Career total			0	0	0	0	0	0	5	0	5	0
