= Bill Mountford =

New Zealand international rugby league footballer

Personal information
- Full name: William Frederick Mountford
- Born: Blackball, New Zealand

Playing information
- Position: Wing, Centre
Club
Years	Team	Pld	T	G	FG	P
	Blackball (WCRL)
Representative
Years	Team	Pld	T	G	FG	P
	West Coast
	South Island
1946	New Zealand	1	0	0	0	0
- Relatives: Ces Mountford (brother); Ken Mountford (brother)

William Frederick Mountford (fl.) is a New Zealand rugby league footballer who represented New Zealand.

== Playing career ==
Born in Blackball on the West Coast of the South Island, Mountford was one of ten children. Five of them, including Bill, went on to play for the South Island. This included Ken, who like Bill also represented New Zealand, and Cecil, who played for Wigan and later coached New Zealand.

Mountford played in one test match for New Zealand, in 1946 against the touring Great Britain Lions.
