= Ken Mountford =

Former NZ international rugby league footballer (1924–1967)

Personal information
- Full name: Kenneth Henry James Mountford
- Born: 27 May 1924 Blackball, New Zealand
- Died: 19 January 1967 (aged 42) Strongman Mine, New Zealand

Playing information
- Position: Five-eighth, Halfback, Lock
Club
Years	Team	Pld	T	G	FG	P
	Blackball
Representative
Years	Team	Pld	T	G	FG	P
1945–48	West Coast
1946–48	South Island
1947–48	New Zealand	6	0	0	0	0
- Source: As of 2 February 2021
- Relatives: Ces Mountford (brother); Bill Mountford (brother)

Kenneth Henry James Mountford (27 May 1924 – 19 January 1967) was a New Zealand rugby league player who represented New Zealand. He was the brother of fellow players Ces Mountford and Bill Mountford.

== Playing career ==
Mountford played for Blackball of the West Coast Rugby League during the 1940s along with his two brothers. Blackball held the Thacker Shield at the time. He represented both the West Coast and the South Island.

He played for the New Zealand national rugby league team in six test matches on the 1947 tour of Great Britain and France.

== Later years ==
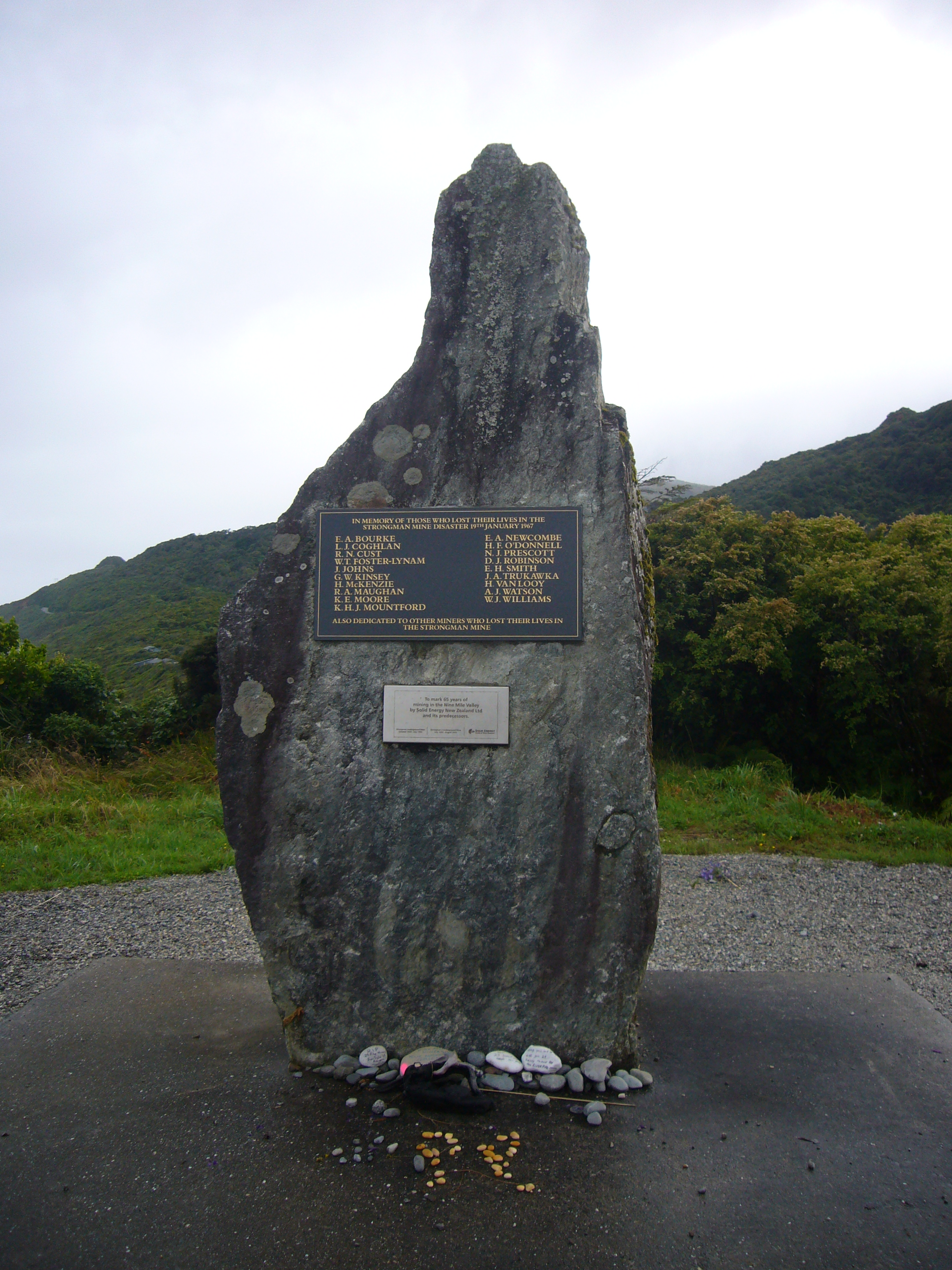
The Strongman Mine memorial on State Highway 6, including the name of K.H.J. Mountford

A coal miner, Mountford was one of 19 miners who lost their lives in the Strongman Mine gas explosion on 19 January 1967.
