= Carolyn Mountford =

Australian researcher

Carolyn Mountford is an Oxford educated Australian based researcher who specializes in magnetic resonance and data mining. Mountford currently holds seven significant patents and twelve PCTs regarding magnetic resonance spectroscopy, prediction of breast cancer, diagnosing and monitoring therapy for PTSD, pain, blast exposure, and ADHD. She is the current CEO of DatChem Pty Ltd and professor of Radiology and Neuroglycobiology at Griffith University. She was made full professor of Radiology at Harvard Medical School in 2011.

== Biography ==
Mountford is a specialist in magnetic resonance spectroscopy (MRS). Her team has been a worldwide development site for Siemens since 1999. This work has resulted in techniques and therapies used by research centres and hospitals for patients with cancer and neurologic and psychological disorders. Her team has worked with the late Professor Michael Cousins AM and with the United States and Australian military on a new in vivo MR approach that can detect changes to brain chemistry. From this study, it has been demonstrated that Traumatic Brain Injury (TBI) is a collective term for blunt force trauma, psychological trauma, blast exposure, and pain. Each of these conditions has a unique neurochemical profile that allows the diagnosis of the condition. The technology has also been shown to monitor response and non-response to therapy.

To date, Mountford has secured approximately $45 million in funding grants. She is the author or co-author of more than 180 peer-review articles and the holder of seven significant patents in the areas of breast cancer, chronic pain, head injury and MR, with a further twelve patents in the pipeline.

Mountford is currently the CEO of DatChem Pty Ltd and Professor of Radiology and Neuroglycobiology at Griffith University. She was previously the CEO and Director of Research for the Translational Research Institute (Australia) (2015-2020). From 2011 until early 2015, Mountford was the Director for the Centre for MR in Health and Professor in Radiology at Newcastle University, Newcastle, New South Wales, where she was instrumental in securing the MRI scanning center. Between 2006 and 2011, Mountford was the Director for Clinical Spectroscopy at the Brigham and Women’s Hospital in Boston, Massachusetts where she was made a Professor in Radiology at Harvard Medical School in 2011.

== Research & Clinical Trials ==
She led a multidisciplinary team who developed a new MRS technique known as localised correlated spectroscopy (L-COSY) to be applied to various clinical human conditions. Following her early work at Ludwig Institute on tumor development, she applied the technology to demonstrate that the scanning technology could detect a series of transitional changes in human breast tissue, which provide early warning signs for women at high risk for breast cancer. This includes women with BRCA 1 and BRCA 2 gene mutations. A twelve year blind clinic trial has shown the technology correctly predicted 32 out of 32 women who would develop a breast cancer two to six years ahead of current methods. The clinic trial documentation was submitted to the United States Food and Drug Administration in April 2025 and is pending approval. If approved, this technology will allow women to make informed decisions as to their treatment.

== Translation Into the Clinic ==
Professor Mountford co-founded the company DatChem Pty Ltd with Professor Peter Malycha AM, a breast surgeon, to allow the technology to be made available to the general public. The IP from their preceding positions has been assigned into DatChem. DatChem receives the spectral data from a scanner, compares it to clinical databases, and returns a chemical report of each individual patient back to the referring clinician or hospital. The recently completed twelve year clinical trial strongly suggests that the extent of deviations from normal can be documented prior to a full blown malignancy occurring.
