= William Fowler Mountford Copeland =

British horticulturist

William Fowler Mountford Copeland (13 February 1872 – 17 January 1953) was a British amateur horticulturist. He was attended Trinity College, Cambridge.

He was the son of Richard Pirie Copeland and grandson of William Taylor Copeland. husband of Beatrice Augusta Mary Geddes and father of Mary Beatrice, 1912–2003; Irene Emily, 1914–1996; and John Richard Geddes, 1917–1946, after whom were named the varieties of daffodils 'Mrs. William Copeland', 'John Evelyn', 'Irene Copeland' and 'Mary Copeland' respectively.

In 2025, the Royal Horticultural Society led a public search across the UK for any bulbs of the variety 'Mrs. William Copeland' flowering in private gardens.
