= Charles H. Mountford =

Charlie Hugh Mountford is a humorist and poet. His family, originally from Birmingham, England, came to Canada early in the twentieth century. He was educated at the University of Western Ontario (MA English) and The University of London (MA Librarianship). He has written books of humorous monologues and books of poetry. He has been a banker, a school librarian, a researcher of historical buildings and the founder and artistic director of Poetry Stratford, A Reading Series. He has also written the librettos for five modern chamber operas which have been produced in Stratford. He enjoys performing his humorous monologues as solo shows. Charlie and his wife, Ruth, (who is a professional photographer) live in Stratford, Ontario and, part-time, in Quebec City.

== Works ==
- The Harvestman (2004), ISBN 0-920820-60-3
- The Night the Ducks Got Loose (2006), ISBN 0-920820-73-5
- Voice Of An Angel (Opera Libretto, produced Stratford, 2000)
- A Stronger Thought Of Love (Opera Libretto, produced Stratford, 2006)
- Henry Hudson (Opera Libretto, produced Stratford, 2008)
- The Thing On The Comb (2011), ISBN 978-1-897163-10-8
- Worried About Love (2013), ISBN 978-1-897163-19-1
- The Swan Dive (2013), ISBN 978-1-897163-20-7
- The Teeth of Tarpon Springs (2014), ISBN 978-1-897163-21-4
- A Fine House In Shaking Bay (2014), ISBN 978-1-897163-22-1
- A Joker, A Toker A Real Estate Broker (2014), ISBN 978-0-9690621-2-7
- painterly (2015), ISBN 978-0-9690621-1-0
- D'Arcy (Opera Libretto, produced in Stratford, 2016)
- Edna loves Stumpy (2016), ISBN 978-0-9690621-3-4
- Dracool or the pleasure of his company (2017), ISBN 978-0-9690621-0-3

== Awards ==
- First Prize, Alberta Poetry Contest, short poem category
- Caroline Kizer Workshop Prize, University of Indiana
- Finalist, 2009, Atlanta Review Poetry Competition
- Shortlisted, Bridport UK Poetry Competition 2008, 2010, x2 2017
- Highly Commended Prize, poetry, Bridport UK Prize 2017
