= Sean Mountford =

English footballer

Personal information
- Full name: Sean Mountford
- Date of birth: 11 October 1988 (age 38)
- Place of birth: Billinge, Greater Manchester, England
- Height: 1.76 m (5 ft 9 1/2 in)
- Positions: Left-back; left midfielder; right midfielder

Youth career
- 2000–2003: Manchester City
- 2003–2008: Bolton Wanderers

Senior career*
Years	Team	Apps	(Gls)
2005–2008	Bolton Wanderers	0	(0)
2009–2010	Atherton Laburnum Rovers	26	(11)
2010–2011	AEZ Zakakiou	12	(2)
2011–2012	Akritas Chlorakas	16	(0)
2012–2013	Hyde	4	(0)
2013–2014	Atherton Laburnum Rovers	13	(1)
- * Club domestic league appearances and goals

Sean Mountford (born 11 October 1988) is an English footballer who plays as a left-back and wide midfielder. He started his career with Bolton Wanderers before moving to Cyprus to play professionally with AEZ Zakakiou and Akritas Chlorakas. He moved back to England in 2012 to play non-league football with Hyde United and Atherton Laburnum Rovers.

== Early life and education ==
Mountford was born in Billinge, Greater Manchester and was brought up in Leigh where he attended Bedford High School. He played for Wigan Schoolboys and Warrington County teams. He grew up supporting Manchester United and his favourite player was Ryan Giggs.

== Club career ==
=== Bolton Wanderers ===
Mountford was playing for Bolton Wanderers U16s in October 2003 when he was invited to train with the Academy team. He progressed to the Reserve team where he played numerous times. On 9 July 2005, Mountford scored two goals for the first team as Bolton won 10–0 in a pre-season friendly against Rushen United in the Isle of Man. After leaving Bolton he had offers from League One and League Two clubs but rejected them for personal and family reasons.
