= Ces Mountford =

Former NZ international rugby league coach & NZ rugby league footballer

Ces Mountford MBE
Personal information
- Full name: Cecil Ralph Mountford
- Born: 16 June 1919 Blackball, New Zealand
- Died: 19 July 2009 (aged 90)

Playing information
- Position: Stand-off
Club
Years	Team	Pld	T	G	FG	P
1946–51	Wigan	210	70	55	0	320
1952	Warrington
	Total	210	70	55	0	320
Representative
Years	Team	Pld	T	G	FG	P
1950–50	Other Nationalities	2	0	0	0	0

Coaching information
Club
Years	Team	Gms	W	D	L	W%
1952–61	Warrington
1972–73	Blackpool Borough
	Total	0	0	0	0
Representative
Years	Team	Gms	W	D	L	W%
1979–82	New Zealand
- Relatives: Bill Mountford (brother); Ken Mountford (brother)

Cecil Ralph Mountford MBE (16 June 1919 – 19 July 2009), also known by the nickname of "The Blackball Bullet", was a New Zealand rugby league footballer and coach.

Mountford was one of ten siblings, he and four of his brothers played rugby league for the South Island whilst Bill Mountford and Ken Mountford played for New Zealand. Mountford also played for West Coast, along with Bill and Ken, in inter-provincial matches.

== Early years ==
Mountford played soccer at school, as he was considered too small to play rugby league. In 1935 at the age of 16 he joined Blackball Rugby League club, where he earned the nickname 'The Blackball Bullet' due to his speed on the field.

== Playing career ==
=== Wigan ===
Mountford signed for Wigan Rugby League Club in 1946, he shared in one of Wigan’s finest moments in the 1949/50 campaign when, as captain – in place of usual captain Joe Egan who was on tour with seven other Wigan stars – he led his side to a sensational 20-2 Championship Final win over Huddersfield at Maine Road.

Mountford played in the Challenge Cup final at Wembley Stadium on two occasions, the first being in 1948, when they beat the current title holders Bradford Northern 8–3 in a nail biting final. The second visit, in 1951, Mountford led the team to a 10-0 victory over Barrow in a rain-soaked Wembley final. He also became the first overseas player to receive the Lance Todd Trophy.

Cecil Mountford played stand-off in Wigan's 9-3 victory over Belle Vue Rangers in the 1946–47 Lancashire Cup Final during the 1946–47 season at Station Road, Swinton on Saturday 26 October 1946, played stand-off in the 14-8 victory over Warrington in the 1948–49 Lancashire Cup Final during the 1948–49 season at Station Road, Swinton on Saturday 13 November 1948, played stand-off in the 20-7 victory over Leigh in the 1949–50 Lancashire Cup Final during the 1949–50 season at Wilderspool Stadium, Warrington on Saturday 29 October 1949, and played stand-off in the 28-5 victory over Warrington in the 1950–51 Lancashire Cup Final during the 1950–51 season at Station Road, Swinton on Saturday 4 November 1950.

=== International career ===
Internationally he missed out on playing for New Zealand, but he did represent Other Nationalities in two European Championships, in a team labelled "The Rest", in 1950, watched by a crowd of 25,000 fans. He requested, and was granted, permission from Wigan to join the 1947-8 New Zealand tour of Great Britain but the Management decided that injuries were not bad enough to bring him in. Instead, during the Kiwis tour Cecil played for Wigan against the Kiwis, which included his brother Ken.

Mountford was appointed head coach of the New Zealand team in 1979, leading the Kiwis on their 1980 tour of Great Britain and France and the 1982 tour of Australia and Papua New Guinea. New Zealand won 6 games, lost 8 and drew 1 under Mountford's coaching. He was replaced in 1983 by Graham Lowe.

== Coaching career ==
In 1951 Mountford qualified as a first grade coach, being offered a 10-year contract at Warrington, despite Wigan initially refusing to release him as a player. Mountford made his first appearance for Warrington in October 1952 initially as a player coach.

Cecil Mountford was the coach in Warrington's 8–7 victory over Halifax the Championship Final during the 1953–54 season at Maine Road, Manchester on Saturday 8 May 1954, in front of a crowd of 36,519.

Cecil Mountford was the coach in Warrington's 8–4 victory over Halifax in the 1953–54 Challenge Cup Final replay during the 1953–54 season at Odsal Stadium, Bradford on Wednesday 5 May 1954, in front of a record crowd of 102,575 or more. At the time, this was a world record attendance for a rugby match of either code.

After completing his tenure as a coach, he returned to New Zealand in May 1961, before heading back to England as Manager of Blackpool Borough in 1972, which was short-lived when he resigned in June 1973. Mountford returned to New Zealand in 1974, initially providing coaching courses before being signed as the manager-coach of the New Zealand national rugby league team from 1979 to 1982.

== Honours ==
In the 1987 Queen's Birthday Honours, Mountford was appointed a Member of the Order of the British Empire, for services to rugby league and in 1990 he was inducted into the New Zealand Sports Hall of Fame. In 2000 he was inducted as one of the New Zealand Rugby League Legends of League.
