= William Mountford =

English Unitarian preacher and author

William Mountford (31 May 1816 – 20 April 1885) was an English Unitarian preacher and author.

== Childhood and education ==
He was born in Kidderminster, England. After his mother's death, he was adopted by her sister, Miss Follows, who lived with her aged father. Mountford always spoke of her with affectionate respect: she was a great reader, and did what she could to teach the children of the poor.

He was a delicate child; and the limp, which was one of his peculiarities, was the result of early weakness. Once he was nearly drowned in the River Stour, from which he was dragged out senseless. He went to Pearsall's Grammar School; and "his intelligence and his quiet studious habits soon won for him the esteem of the schoolmaster, the Rev. Evan Jones", who left him his library. He there became known to the Rev. J. Kentish, of Birmingham, who encouraged him to prepare for entrance at York College. While attending the school of the Rev. E. Bristow at Birmingham, he boarded with Mr. and Mrs. T. H. Carpenter, who being without children of their own, were glad to have such an inmate. He wrote that one of his hosts "had much to do with my tone of thinking and independence. I venerate his memory, and love it. It was an unbroken time of happiness that I passed at King Alfred's Place." During his vacation, he paid a week's visit to Mr. Kentish, who helped him in the purchase of books. Mountford entered Manchester College in York in 1813, then aged about seventeen. In many of his letters, he expressed his thankfulness for his training among the English Presbyterians, and the accurate scholarship of his learned tutors: "If Mr. Wellbeloved did not show us all truth, he gave us that honesty and freedom of thought which are the master-keys of all knowledge, sooner or later." In his earlier sessions, though he was a painstaking student, he gave no promise of eminence. Towards the end of his course, he seemed kindled with fresh thoughts. While in York, Mountford came under the influence of James Martineau, and renounced the philosophy of Hartley and Mill. He astonished the little congregation supplied by the students with a vehemence and fervor they little anticipated, for he was very short in stature, and boyish in appearance.

== Early work as a clergyman ==
Within a month after leaving college (8 July 1838), he commenced his ministry at the Strangeways Chapel, Manchester (opened 17 June). It had been built for the Greengate congregation, founded by the Rev. J. R. Beard (D.D. in 1841). An unfortunate dispute had, however, arisen; and those who claimed the new chapel wished to appoint a new minister. Mountford had consulted Mr. Kentish, who told him that he had no right to decline; but he little anticipated the difficulties that beset him. The leading ministers of the district resented the exclusion of their able and zealous friend, and the ardent young preacher felt himself unwelcome. He was never so unhappy in his life. He worked, however, with great energy, overdoing himself — and his hearers; for some of his doctrinal lectures were nearly an hour and a half in length. He was also a laborious student; but his health suffered, and after about three years he resigned. On 21 October 1841, a massive silver inkstand and a purse of £60 were presented to him at a congregational meeting. Sir T. Potter, who presided, said that "their late esteemed pastor had secured their warmest approbation and affectionate regard." (Dr. Beard subsequently became the minister of the chapel.)

After a short ministry at Hinckley, he moved to Lynn, Norfolk. In February 1814 he wrote, after a long interval: "Ill health does not make me communicative. The last six months before leaving Manchester and eighteen subsequent months I was very ill. Also, when one of your letters reached me, I was in want of some of the necessaries of life, owing to a heavy loss which I sustained in endeavoring to assist some persons. ... It is good for me to have been afflicted. I have more peace of mind than I have possessed at any time since leaving college. My hair, which had begun to turn gray, is now as black as formerly." He speaks of having travelled abroad; and perhaps at this time he obtained the degree of Ph.D., M.A., at a German university. He styled himself "M.A." in only one of his books: on the title pages of the rest, he is simply called "William Mountford." His salary was now only £70 a year; and he lived chiefly on brown bread and milk, that he might be able to buy books.

== Visit to and retirement in the United States ==
Mountford had long wished to visit the United States, and in 1849, Dr. Huntington obtained a free passage for him. He sailed in November, arriving in Boston early in 1850 and preaching in Dr. Huntington's church the next Sunday morning, and the following Thursday, 17 January. He preached for a time at the Unitarian church at Washington, D.C., where President Millard Fillmore had a seat and Daniel Webster and Edward Everett were occasional attendants. In the summer of 1851, he had preached at Nahant, a favorite seaside resort about twelve miles from Boston. Among his hearers was Miss E. Crowninshield, who Mountford married in March, 1853. At her wish, he resigned his pastoral charge, though he preached occasionally. They resided at her house in Boston after spending the summer at Nahant.

The Mountfords were in Europe from 1858 to 1860. He preached only at York and Hampstead. Interesting and characteristic letters on his travels appeared in the Quarterly Journal of the American Unitarian Association. They stayed a long time in Rome, where "the subject of the supernatural" grew on him "as to importance, and deepened as to interest". In a second visit, 1867, he preached at Bridport (2 June) with great power and earnestness on the "Open Vision". Between these journeys, he had been writing a book, for which he studied the Fathers and Neo-Platonists; but he resolved not to speak of it till it was finished. It was not printed; but it probably contained the substance of five articles on "The Miraculous" in the Monthly Religious Magazine in 1868–69. These excited great attention, and were praised both by the Orthodox and the Radicals, so that he was encouraged to add another on " The Outburst of Spiritualism".

Mountford ultimately retired to Cambridge, Massachusetts. His works include Christianity: the Deliverance of the Soul and its Life (1846); Martyria: a Legend (1846); Euthanasy, or Happy Talks toward the End of Life (1850); Beauties of Channing (1852); Thorpe: a Quiet English Town and Life Therein, based on Hinckley, Leicestershire (1852); and Miracles Past and Present (1870). He died in Boston.
