= Montford =

Montford may refer to:

== People ==
=== People with the surname ===
- Andrew Montford, English writer and editor who maintains the Bishop Hill blog
- Arthur Montford (1929–2014), Scottish television sports journalist
- Bill Montford (born 1947), American politician from Florida
- Edgar Montford (1865–1940), Welsh footballer
- Harry Montford (1863–1942), Welsh footballer
- Joe Montford (born 1970), American footballer
- John T. Montford (born 1943), American businessman and politician from Texas
- Paul Raphael Montford (1868–1938), English-born Australian sculptor
- Simon de Montford (executed 1495), English nobleman
- Susan Montford, Scottish film director, screenwriter, and producer

=== People with the given name ===
- Montford Johnson (1843–1896), Chickasaw cattleman
- Montford McGehee (1822–1895), American lawyer, farmer and politician in North Carolina
- Montford Scott (executed 1591), English Roman Catholic priest and martyr
- Montford George Southall (1907–1993), British Olympic cyclist known as George Southall
- Montford Johnson Wagner (born 1980), American professional golfer

== Places ==
- Montford, Shropshire, England, UK; a village and parish
- Montford, North Carolina, USA

=== Facilities and structures ===
- Montford Middle School, Leon County Schools, Leon County, Florida, USA
- Montford Bridge, Montford Bridge, Shropshire, England, UK; a bridge over the Severn in the eponymous village of Montford Bridge

== Other uses ==
- HMS Montford, patrol boat of the Royal Navy and Nigerian Navy between 1957 and 1967

== See also ==
- RAF Montford Bridge, a British air force facility in Shropshire, England, UK
- Montford Point (disambiguation)
- Senator Montford (disambiguation)
- Montfort (disambiguation)
- Mount Ford
