= Harry Brockbank =

English footballer

Personal information
- Full name: Harry William Brockbank
- Date of birth: 26 September 1998 (age 28)
- Place of birth: Bolton, England
- Position: Defender

Team information
- Current team: Clitheroe

Youth career
- 2005–2018: Bolton Wanderers

Senior career*
| Years | Team | Apps | (Gls) |
| 2016–2022 | Bolton Wanderers | 31 | (0) |
| 2016–2017 | → Hyde United (loan) | 0 | (0) |
| 2018–2019 | → Salford City (loan) | 1 | (0) |
| 2022 | El Paso Locomotive | 11 | (2) |
| 2022–2023 | St Patrick's Athletic | 17 | (0) |
| 2024 | Radcliffe | 2 | (0) |
| 2024 | → Bury (loan) | 4 | (0) |
| 2024–2025 | Clitheroe | 0 | (0) |
- * Club domestic league appearances and goals as of 05:46, 11 April 2024 (UTC)

Harry William Brockbank (born 26 September 1998) is an English former footballer who played as a defender for Bolton before playing Non-League football.

== Early life ==
Brockbank was educated at Turton School.

== Club career ==
=== Bolton Wanderers ===
Harry Brockbank joined the Bolton Wanderers academy at the age of seven, playing in central defence all through the age groups. Brockbank had numerous different coaches whilst progressing through the academy, most notably former Bolton Wanderers players Gavin McCann at Under 15s and Nicky Spooner at Under 16s.

==== Loans ====
Brockbank joined Hyde United on loan alongside teammate Ryan White on 16 December 2016. He made no appearances during this loan spell. Two years later he was loaned to Salford City on 30 November 2018 and made his debut on 18 December, starting and playing the full 90 minutes in a 3–1 win against Gateshead in the FA Trophy first round, helping Salford reach the second round for the first time in their history. He played one more game, on 1 January 2019, coming on as a late substitute for Matt Green in a 2–0 league win against Wrexham.

==== First Team ====
He made his debut for Bolton on 19 April 2019, starting in a 0–2 defeat against Aston Villa. This result meant Bolton were relegated to League One. Brockbank was originally released by the club when his contract expired on 30 June 2019, however he signed a new two-year contract on 3 August 2019 despite interest from Burnley and Sunderland. When the senior players refused to play against Coventry City due to unpaid wages, Brockbank played as Captain, and lead the youngest team in Bolton Wanderers history, with an average age of 19, to a 0–0 draw. Brockbank described captaining the club as his dream come true and that Bolton are the only team he wants to play for.

On 2 June 2021 the club announced that Brockbank had signed a new two-year deal which would keep him at the club until at least June 2023. On 19 January 2022, the club announced that he had been released from the remainder of his contract to take up a potential playing opportunity in America.

=== El Paso Locomotive ===
On 21 January 2022, Brockbank signed for USL Championship side El Paso Locomotive. He made his debut on the opening day of the season in which he came on as a half–time substitute for Shavon John-Brown in a 3–1 defeat against Sacramento Republic. On 24 March he scored the first goal of his career in a 5–4 defeat against Las Vegas Lights. On 21 May, he left El Paso by mutual consent later stating he left as he was homesick.

=== St Patrick's Athletic ===
It was announced on 1 July 2022 that Brockbank had signed for League of Ireland Premier Division club St Patrick's Athletic. In signing for St Patrick's Athletic, he reunited with former Bolton team mate Eoin Doyle with Brockbank stating it was Doyle who had arranged for Brockbank to have a trial at the club. His debut came on 15 July 2022, in a 1–1 draw against Dundalk at Richmond Park. Brockbank made his first appearance in European football on 21 July 2022 in a 1–1 draw with Slovenian side NŠ Mura in the UEFA Europa Conference League. After making 15 appearances in his first half season at the club, Brockbank signed a new one-year contract with the club on 8 November 2022. He made just 9 appearances in an injury plagued 2023, before being released at the end of his contract in December 2023.

=== Radcliffe ===
In January 2024, he moved to Northern Premier League Premier Division side Radcliffe. A month later, he joined North West Counties Premier Division side Bury on a 28 day loan.

=== Clitheroe ===
In June 2024, he signed for Clitheroe.

== Personal life ==
In January 2021 Brockbank took on the role as a mental health ambassador for Bolton Wanderers and spends part of his free time helping to support people battling with mental health problems. On 21 May 2021, he was given an award by the Professional Footballers' Association for his work in helping people that struggle with their mental health.

== Style of play ==
He can play in every defensive position and can even play as an emergency goalkeeper though his natural position is as a right-back.

== Career statistics ==
As of match played 9 March 2024

| Club | Season | League | | | National Cup (Note: Includes FA Cup & FAI Cup) | | League Cup | | Other | | Total | |
| Club | Season | Division | Apps | Goals | Apps | Goals | Apps | Goals | Apps | Goals | Apps | Goals |
|---|---|---|---|---|---|---|---|---|---|---|---|---|
| Bolton Wanderers | 2018–19 | Championship | 3 | 0 | 0 | 0 | 0 | 0 | 0 | 0 | 3 | 0 |
| Bolton Wanderers | 2019–20 | League One | 6 | 0 | 0 | 0 | 1 | 0 | 1 (Note: Appearance(s) in the EFL Trophy.) | 0 | 8 | 0 |
| Bolton Wanderers | 2020–21 | League Two | 18 | 0 | 0 | 0 | 0 | 0 | 1 | 0 | 19 | 0 |
| Bolton Wanderers | 2021–22 | League One | 4 | 0 | 0 | 0 | 1 | 0 | 2 | 0 | 7 | 0 |
| Bolton Wanderers | Total | | 31 | 0 | 0 | 0 | 2 | 0 | 4 | 0 | 37 | 0 |
| Hyde United (loan) | 2016–17 | Northern Premier League | 0 | 0 | 0 | 0 | — | | 0 | 0 | 0 | 0 |
| Salford City (loan) | 2018–19 | National League | 1 | 0 | 0 | 0 | — | | 1 (Note: Appearance(s) in the FA Trophy.) | 0 | 2 | 0 |
| El Paso Locomotive | 2022 | USL Championship | 11 | 2 | 1 | 0 | — | | 0 | 0 | 12 | 2 |
| St Patrick's Athletic | 2022 | LOI Premier Division | 11 | 0 | 0 | 0 | — | | 4 (Note: Appearance(s) in the UEFA Europa Conference League.) | 0 | 15 | 0 |
| St Patrick's Athletic | 2023 | LOI Premier Division | 6 | 0 | 0 | 0 | — | | 3 (Note: 1 appearance in the Leinster Senior Cup and 2 appearances in the UEFA Europa Conference League.) | 0 | 9 | 0 |
| St Patrick's Athletic | Total | | 17 | 0 | 0 | 0 | — | | 7 | 0 | 24 | 0 |
| Radcliffe | 2023–24 | Northern Premier League | 2 | 0 | — | | — | | 0 | 0 | 2 | 0 |
| Bury (loan) | 2023–24 | NWC Premier Division | 4 | 0 | — | | — | | 0 | 0 | 4 | 0 |
| Career total | | | 65 | 2 | 1 | 0 | 2 | 0 | 12 | 0 | 80 | 2 |

== Honours ==
Bolton Wanderers

- EFL League Two third-place (promotion): 2020–21

St Patrick's Athletic

- FAI Cup: 2023

Radcliffe

- Northern Premier League: 2023–24
