= Mountford family =

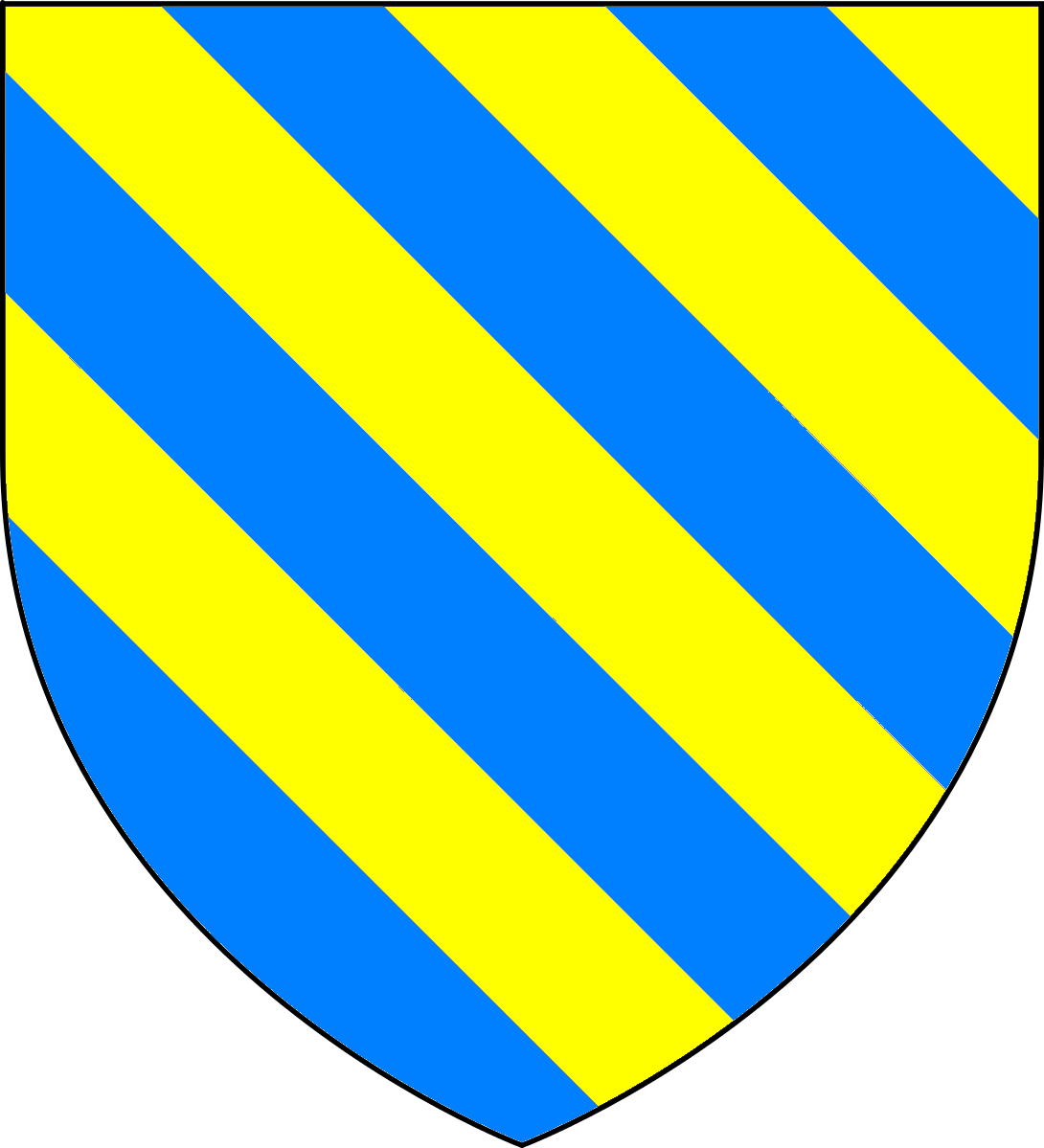
Arms of Mountford of Beaudesert Castle, Warwickshire: Bendy or and azure (number of bends variable)

The Mountford family (also spelled "Mountfort" in contemporary sources, and "Montfort" by later sources) were a gentry family which held lands in Coleshill, Warwickshire, England during the late Middle Ages. They were involved in an inheritance dispute in 1452 which was caused by the disinheritance of a senior line, in favour of the sons of a second wife.

== Descent ==
=== Sir John Mountford ===
The family was descended from Sir John Mountford, the illegitimate son of Peter Mountford (d. 1369), third lord of the manor of Beaudesert, Warwickshire by his mistress Lauren Ullenhall. (No barony "of Beaudesert" existed until 1550, when the "Barony of Paget de Beaudesert, County Stafford" was created for the Paget family.) Sir John Mountford inherited four manors from his father, which he had transferred to him from the legitimate line. Sir John Mountford added another three manors to his landholdings by marrying Joan Clinton, the heiress of Clinton of Coleshill.

=== Baldwin Mountford ===
Baldwin Mountford (d. 1386), son of Sir John Mountford, entered the service of John of Gaunt, 1st Duke of Lancaster. Baldwin died in Spain in 1386 trying to press the Duke's claim to Castile. Baldwin had two sons who were under the guardianship of William Bagot. The elder son, named John after his father, died in 1394.

=== Sir William Mountford ===
Baldwin's second son, Sir William Mountford, had developed a close relationship with Richard Beauchamp, 13th Earl of Warwick. He was knighted after returning from the Hundred Years' War in France. William made an advantageous marriage with Margaret Peche, daughter and heiress of Sir John Peche, which significantly increased the family's landholdings in Warwickshire. By 1436, Sir William was the wealthiest landowner in Warwickshire below the rank of baron. Sir William eventually developed connections with the court of King Henry VI, which he used in an attempt to disinherit the senior line of his family, in favour of the children of his second wife.

== Bibliography ==
- Carpenter, Christine (2004). "Mountford family (per. c.1370–1495)". Oxford Dictionary of National Biography (online ed.). Oxford University Press. doi:10.1093/ref:odnb/52788. (Subscription or UK public library membership required.)
- Griffiths, Ralph A. (1964). King and Country: England and Wales in the Fifteenth Century. A&C Black. ISBN 978-1-85285-018-0.
- Harriss, Gerald (November 9, 2006). Shaping the Nation: England 1360-1461. OUP Oxford. ISBN 978-0-19-921119-7.
- Mercer, Malcolm (2010). The Medieval Gentry: Power, Leadership and Choice During the Wars of the Roses. A&C Black. ISBN 978-1-4411-9064-2.
