= 2022–23 Bolton Wanderers F.C. season =

Bolton Wanderers
2022–23 season
- Owner: Football Ventures Ltd (92%); British Business Bank (8%)
- Chairman: Sharon Brittan
- Manager: Ian Evatt
- Stadium: University of Bolton Stadium
- League One: 5th
- Play-offs: Semi-finals
- FA Cup: First round
- EFL Cup: Second round
- EFL Trophy: Winners
- Top goalscorer: League: Dion Charles (16); All: Dion Charles (21)
- Highest home attendance: 25,428 (vs. Derby County, 27 December)
- Lowest home attendance: 2,115 (vs. Crewe Alexandra, 30 August)
- Average home league attendance: 18,813
- Biggest win: 5–0 vs Peterborough United, 11 February vs Milton Keynes Dons 14 February
- Biggest defeat: 1–4 vs Aston Villa, 23 August
| Home colours | Away colours | Third colours |

The 2022–23 season is the 134th season in the existence of Bolton Wanderers Football Club, the club's second consecutive season in EFL League One and the first time in five seasons that they have started consecutive seasons in the same division. It will cover the period from 1 July 2022 to 30 June 2023. In addition to the league, they will also compete in the 2022–23 FA Cup, the 2022–23 EFL Cup and the 2022–23 EFL Trophy.

== Squad ==
=== First team ===
Note: Flags indicate national team as defined under FIFA eligibility rules; some limited exceptions apply. Players may hold more than one non-FIFA nationality.

| No. | Pos. | Nation | Player |
|---|---|---|---|
| 2 | DF | WAL | Gethin Jones (vice-captain) |
| 3 | DF | WAL | Declan John |
| 4 | MF | WAL | MJ Williams |
| 5 | DF | POR | Ricardo Santos (captain) |
| 6 | DF | SCO | George Johnston |
| 8 | MF | WAL | Josh Sheehan |
| 9 | FW | ISL | Jón Daði Böðvarsson |
| 10 | FW | NIR | Dion Charles |
| 11 | FW | ENG | Dan Nlundulu (on loan from Southampton) |
| 12 | GK | ENG | Joel Dixon |
| 14 | DF | AUS | Jack Iredale |
| 16 | MF | ENG | Aaron Morley |
| 17 | MF | ENG | Shola Shoretire (on loan from Manchester United) |

| No. | Pos. | Nation | Player |
|---|---|---|---|
| 18 | DF | NIR | Eoin Toal |
| 19 | GK | ENG | James Trafford (on loan from Manchester City) |
| 20 | MF | ENG | Kieran Lee |
| 21 | DF | NIR | Conor Bradley (on loan from Liverpool) |
| 22 | MF | ENG | Kyle Dempsey |
| 23 | MF | WAL | Lloyd Isgrove |
| 24 | FW | COD | Elias Kachunga |
| 25 | MF | ENG | George Thomason |
| 27 | DF | ENG | Randell Williams |
| 28 | DF | ENG | Luke Mbete (on loan from Manchester City) |
| 29 | FW | NGR | Victor Adeboyejo |
| 35 | FW | ENG | Cameron Jerome |

=== Bolton B ===
Note: Flags indicate national team as defined under FIFA eligibility rules; some limited exceptions apply. Players may hold more than one non-FIFA nationality.

| No. | Pos. | Nation | Player |
|---|---|---|---|
| 33 | FW | ENG | Gerald Sithole |
| 38 | MF | MAW | Nelson Khumbeni |
| 43 | DF | ENG | Lamine Toure |
| — | GK | ENG | Ellis Litherland |

| No. | Pos. | Nation | Player |
|---|---|---|---|
| — | DF | ENG | Lynford Sackey |
| — | DF | IRL | Eric Yoro |
| — | MF | ENG | Andrew Tutte (Player-coach) |
| — | FW | ENG | Finlay Lockett |

=== Out on loan ===
Note: Flags indicate national team as defined under FIFA eligibility rules; some limited exceptions apply. Players may hold more than one non-FIFA nationality.

| No. | Pos. | Nation | Player |
|---|---|---|---|
| 7 | MF | IRL | Kieran Sadlier (on loan at Leyton Orient until 30 June 2023) |
| 36 | MF | ENG | Connor Stanley (on loan at Bamber Bridge until 30 June 2023) |
| 39 | FW | IRL | Conor Carty (on loan at St Patrick's Athletic until 30 November 2023) |
| 40 | GK | ENG | Luke Hutchinson (on loan at Radcliffe until 30 June 2023) |
| 42 | MF | ENG | Matthew Tweedley (on loan at Lancaster City until 30 June 2023) |

| No. | Pos. | Nation | Player |
|---|---|---|---|
| — | GK | ENG | Mackenzie Chapman (on loan at Atherton Collieries until 30 June 2023) |
| — | DF | ENG | Max Conway (on loan at Buxton until 30 June 2023) |
| — | DF | ENG | Adam Senior (on loan at FC Halifax Town until 30 June 2023) |
| — | MF | ENG | Arran Pettifer (on loan at Atherton Collieries until 30 June 2023) |
| — | FW | ENG | Matty Grivosti (on loan at Radcliffe until 30 June 2023) |

== Pre-season and friendlies ==
On 11 May 2022, the club announced that they would be travelling to Portugal for a training camp once the squad reported for pre season training on 17 June. Five days later, Bolton announced their opening batch of pre-season fixtures with trips to Longridge Town, Chorley, Oldham Athletic and Southport. A further fixture away to Carlisle United was confirmed on 20 May. On 23 May, the game at Oldham Athletic was cancelled after the reaction of some supporters to the fixture. The same day, two more fixtures against Atherton Collieries and Bamber Bridge were announced. On 8 June, Bolton announced their first home fixture of pre-season, against Championship side Huddersfield Town to be played on 23 July, a week before the start of the season. Another friendly against Stockport County was confirmed the same day, to be played on 5 July behind closed doors due to both teams pitches being re-laid. On 24 June, the final fixture of pre-season was announced against Championship side Watford to be played on 12 July behind closed doors at Watford Training Ground. It also served as a replacement fixture for the cancelled Oldham Athletic friendly. On 9 July, Bolton played an unannounced friendly against their near neighbours Wigan Athletic.

Win Draw Loss Fixtures

| 28 June 2022 Friendly | Longridge Town | 0–9 | Bolton Wanderers | Longridge |
| 19:45 BST | | Report | Dempsey 11'; Kachunga 24'; Bakayoko 41'; Charles 54', 61', 75'; Johnston 69'; Böðvarsson 78'; Afolayan 83' | Stadium: Mike Riding Ground; Attendance: 1,056 |

| 2 July 2022 Harold Taylor Memorial Trophy | Chorley | 1–3 | Bolton Wanderers | Chorley |
| 14:10 BST | Hall 89' | Report | Charles 2'; Böðvarsson 42'; Kachunga 78' | Stadium: Victory Park; Attendance: 3,087 |

| 5 July 2022 Friendly | Stockport County | 2–2 | Bolton Wanderers | Carrington |
| 13:00 | Collar 62'; Hippolyte 76' | Report | Kachunga 63'; Bradley 65'; Afolayan (yellow card) 84' | Stadium: Carrington Training Centre; Attendance: Behind closed doors |

| 9 July 2022 Friendly | Bolton Wanderers | 0–1 | Wigan Athletic | Bolton |
| 12:00 BST | | Report | Wyke 33' (pen.) | Stadium: Lostock Training Ground; Attendance: Behind closed doors |

| 12 July 2022 Friendly | Oldham Athletic | P–P | Bolton Wanderers | Oldham |
| 19:45 BST | | | | Stadium: Boundary Park |
Note: On May 23, Bolton Wanderers called off the planned fixture due to concerns of the reaction from some supporters.

| 12 July 2022 Friendly | Watford | 0–2 | Bolton Wanderers | St Albans |
| 15:00 BST | | Report | Lee 14'; Afolayan 43' | Stadium: Watford Training Ground; Attendance: Behind closed doors |

| 13 July 2022 Friendly | Atherton Collieries | 1–0 | Bolton Wanderers B | Atherton |
| 19:30 BST | Trialist 89' | Report | | Stadium: Alder Street |

| 16 July 2022 Friendly | Carlisle United | 3–1 | Bolton Wanderers | Carlisle |
| 15:00 BST | Edmondson 19'; Barclay 38'; Dennis 52' | Report | Morley 50' (pen.) | Stadium: Brunton Park; Attendance: 2,239; Referee: Anthony Backhouse |

| 19 July 2022 Friendly | Bamber Bridge | 1–0 | Bolton Wanderers B | Bamber Bridge |
| 19:30 BST | Sinclair-Smith 64' | Report | | Stadium: Sir Tom Finney Stadium; Attendance: 415 |

| 23 July 2022 Friendly | Bolton Wanderers | 1–1 | Huddersfield Town | Bolton |
| 15:00 BST | Sadlier 90+4' | Report | Ward 45+2' | Stadium: University of Bolton Stadium; Attendance: 4,421; Referee: Darren Handley |

| 26 July 2022 Friendly | Southport | 2–0 | Bolton Wanderers B | Blowick |
| 19:30 BST | Watson 31'; Woods 90' | Report | | Stadium: Haig Avenue; Attendance: 726 |

| 2 August 2022 Friendly | Warrington Town | 2–2 | Bolton Wanderers B | Warrington |
| 19:45 BST | Buckley-Ricketts 12'; Williams 68' (pen.) | Report | Grivosti 3'; Toure 45+1' | Stadium: Cantilever Park; Attendance: 555; Referee: Matty Corless |

== Competitions ==
=== Overall record ===
| Competition | First match | Last match | Starting round | Final position | Record | | | | | | | |
| Competition | First match | Last match | Starting round | Final position | Pld | W | D | L | GF | GA | GD | Win % |
|---|---|---|---|---|---|---|---|---|---|---|---|---|
| League One | 30 July 2022 | 7 May 2023 | Matchday 1 | 5th | 46 | 23 | 12 | 11 | 62 | 36 | +26 | 50.00 |
| FA Cup | 5 November 2022 | 5 November 2022 | First round | First round | 1 | 0 | 0 | 1 | 1 | 2 | −1 | 0.00 |
| EFL Cup | 9 August 2022 | 23 August 2022 | First round | Second round | 2 | 1 | 0 | 1 | 6 | 5 | +1 | 50.00 |
| EFL Trophy | 30 August 2022 | 2 April 2023 | Group Stage | Winners | 8 | 7 | 1 | 0 | 23 | 5 | +18 | 87.50 |
| Play-offs | 13 May 2023 | 19 May 2023 | Semi final | Semi final | 2 | 0 | 1 | 1 | 1 | 2 | −1 | 0.00 |
| Total | | | | | 59 | 31 | 14 | 14 | 93 | 50 | +43 | 52.54 |

Last updated: 19 May 2023
Source: [Soccerway]

=== League One ===
==== League table ====
| Pos | Team | Pld | W | D | L | GF | GA | GD | Pts | Promotion, qualification or relegation |
|---|---|---|---|---|---|---|---|---|---|---|
| 2 | Ipswich Town (P) | 46 | 28 | 14 | 4 | 101 | 35 | +66 | 98 | Promotion to EFL Championship |
| 3 | Sheffield Wednesday (O, P) | 46 | 28 | 12 | 6 | 81 | 37 | +44 | 96 | Qualification for League One play-offs |
| 4 | Barnsley | 46 | 26 | 8 | 12 | 80 | 47 | +33 | 86 | Qualification for League One play-offs |
| 5 | Bolton Wanderers | 46 | 23 | 12 | 11 | 62 | 36 | +26 | 81 | Qualification for League One play-offs |
| 6 | Peterborough United | 46 | 24 | 5 | 17 | 75 | 54 | +21 | 77 | Qualification for League One play-offs |
| 7 | Derby County | 46 | 21 | 13 | 12 | 67 | 46 | +21 | 76 | |
| 8 | Portsmouth | 46 | 17 | 19 | 10 | 61 | 50 | +11 | 70 | |

Source: EFL Official Website
Rules for classification: 1) Points; 2) Goal difference; 3) Number of goals scored; 4) Head-to-head results; 5) Wins; 6) Away goals; 7) Penalty points (sec 9.5); 8) 12-point sending off offences
(O) Play-off winners; (P) Promoted

==== Results summary ====
| Overall | | | | | | | | Home | | | | | | Away | | | | | |
| Pld | W | D | L | GF | GA | GD | Pts | W | D | L | GF | GA | GD | W | D | L | GF | GA | GD |
|---|---|---|---|---|---|---|---|---|---|---|---|---|---|---|---|---|---|---|---|
| 46 | 23 | 12 | 11 | 62 | 36 | +26 | 81 | 14 | 5 | 4 | 32 | 13 | +19 | 9 | 7 | 7 | 30 | 23 | +7 |

Last updated: 7 May 2023.
Source: [Soccerway]

==== Results by matchday ====
| Matchday | 1 | 2 | 3 | 4 | 5 | 6 | 7 | 8 | 9 | 10 | 11 | 12 | 13 | 14 | 15 | 16 | 17 | 18 | 19 | 20 | 21 | 22 | 23 | 24 | 25 | 26 | 27 | 28 | 29 | 30 | 31 | 32 | 33 | 34 | 35 | 36 | 37 | 38 | 39 | 40 | 41 | 42 | 43 | 44 | 45 | 46 |
|---|---|---|---|---|---|---|---|---|---|---|---|---|---|---|---|---|---|---|---|---|---|---|---|---|---|---|---|---|---|---|---|---|---|---|---|---|---|---|---|---|---|---|---|---|---|---|
| Ground | A | H | A | H | H | A | H | A | H | H | A | A | H | A | H | H | A | A | H | A | H | H | A | A | H | H | A | H | A | H | A | H | A | H | A | A | H | A | A | H | A | A | H | H | H | A |
| Result | D | W | D | W | L | L | W | W | W | W | L | L | D | W | W | L | D | W | D | L | W | D | D | W | D | W | L | W | W | W | W | W | L | W | L | D | L | D | W | D | W | D | W | L | W | W |
| Position | 12 | 3 | 8 | 4 | 7 | 10 | 8 | 5 | 5 | 6 | 6 | 6 | 7 | 6 | 5 | 6 | 7 | 5 | 5 | 5 | 5 | 5 | 6 | 5 | 5 | 5 | 5 | 5 | 5 | 5 | 4 | 3 | 4 | 4 | 4 | 4 | 6 | 6 | 5 | 6 | 5 | 6 | 5 | 5 | 5 | 5 |

Updated to match(es) played on 7 May 2023. Source: 11v11 for league tables and fixtures
A = Away; H = Home; W = Win; D = Draw; L = Loss

==== Matches ====
The fixtures for the 2022–23 EFL League One season were released on 23 June and sees Bolton opening their campaign away at Ipswich Town on 30 July. The regular season will conclude on 7 May away at Bristol Rovers.

Win Draw Loss Fixtures

| 30 July 2022 1 | Ipswich Town | 1–1 | Bolton Wanderers | Ipswich |
| 15:00 BST | Evans 38'; Davis (yellow card) 43'; Woolfenden (yellow card) 74' | Report | Morley 25' (pen.); John (yellow card) 33'; Bradley (yellow card) 64' | Stadium: Portman Road; Attendance: 26,688; Referee: Sam Barrott |

| 6 August 2022 2 | Bolton Wanderers | 3–0 | Wycombe Wanderers | Bolton |
| 15:00 BST | Dempsey 15', 66'; Morley 41' | Report | Grimmer (yellow card) 21'; McCleary (yellow card) 60' | Stadium: University of Bolton Stadium; Attendance: 17,416; Referee: Ben Toner |

| 13 August 2022 3 | Port Vale | 0–0 | Bolton Wanderers | Burslem |
| 15:00 BST | Will Forrester (yellow card) 45+2'; Hall (yellow card) 86' | Report | Santos (yellow card) 10' (yellow-red card) 37'; Williams (yellow card) 49' | Stadium: Vale Park; Attendance: 10,277; Referee: Ross Joyce |

| 16 August 2022 4 | Bolton Wanderers | 1–0 | Morecambe | Bolton |
| 19:45 BST | Bradley 39', (yellow card) 90+5' | Report | Melbourne (yellow card) 23' | Stadium: University of Bolton Stadium; Attendance: 17,165; Referee: Anthony Backhouse |

| 20 August 2022 5 | Bolton Wanderers | 0–2 | Sheffield Wednesday | Bolton |
| 15:00 BST | Bradley (yellow card) 71'; Sadlier (yellow card) 90+4' | Report | Byers 36'; Palmer 38'; Adeniran (yellow card) 90+2' | Stadium: University of Bolton Stadium; Attendance: 22,023; Referee: Charles Breakspear |

| 27 August 2022 6 | Plymouth Argyle | 2–0 | Bolton Wanderers | Plymouth |
| 15:00 BST | Ennis 34', (yellow card) 40'; Edwards (yellow card) 53'; Hardie 88' | Report | Bradley (yellow card) 65' | Stadium: Home Park; Attendance: 14,631; Referee: Will Finnie |

| 3 September 2022 7 | Bolton Wanderers | 3–1 | Charlton Athletic | Bolton |
| 15:00 BST | Bradley 9'; Lee 41'; Iredale (yellow card) 65'; Johnston 76'; Jones (yellow card) 79' | Report | Fraser 4'; Lavelle (yellow card) 75' | Stadium: University of Bolton Stadium; Attendance: 19,193; Referee: Tom Reeves |

| 10 September 2022 | Cheltenham Town | Postponed | Bolton Wanderers | Cheltenham |
| 15:00 BST | | | | Stadium: Whaddon Road |
Note: Fixture was postponed as a mark of respect, following the passing of Queen Elizabeth II.

| 13 September 2022 8 | Milton Keynes Dons | 0–2 | Bolton Wanderers | Milton Keynes |
| 19:45 BST | Tucker (yellow card) 58' | Report | Charles 31' (pen.); Jones 60'; Aaron Morley (yellow card) 89' | Stadium: Stadium MK; Attendance: 6,339; Referee: Christopher Pollard |

| 17 September 2022 9 | Bolton Wanderers | 1–0 | Peterborough United | Bolton |
| 15:00 BST | Iredale (yellow card) 35'; Johnston (yellow card) 45+4'; Afolayan 86'; Williams (yellow card) 90+1'; Sadlier (yellow card) 90+2' | Report | Fuchs (yellow card) 25'; Knight (yellow card) 45+4'; Kyprianou (yellow card) 90' | Stadium: University of Bolton Stadium; Attendance: 17,016; Referee: Carl Brook |

| 24 September 2022 | Portsmouth | Postponed | Bolton Wanderers | Portsmouth |
| 15:00 GMT | | | | Stadium: Fratton Park |
Note: Match was postponed due to both teams having players called up to play international football.

| 1 October 2022 10 | Bolton Wanderers | 2–0 | Lincoln City | Bolton |
| 15:00 BST | Charles 40' (pen.); Williams (yellow card) 48'; Johnston (yellow card) 51'; Böðvarsson 84'; Trafford (yellow card) 90+4' | Report | Jackson (yellow card) 39'; House (yellow card) 51' | Stadium: University of Bolton Stadium; Attendance: 17,263; Referee: Neil Hair |

| 4 October 2022 11 | Cheltenham Town | 1–0 | Bolton Wanderers | Cheltenham |
| 19:45 BST | Norton (yellow card) 70'; Broom 87'; Jackson (yellow card) 90+1' | Report | Williams (yellow card) 65'; Thomason (yellow card) 70' | Stadium: Whaddon Road; Attendance: 3,988; Referee: Gavin Ward |

| 8 October 2022 12 | Forest Green Rovers | 1–0 | Bolton Wanderers | Nailsworth |
| 15:00 BST | McAllister (yellow card) 19'; Wickham 32'; Marques (yellow card) 58'; Hendry (yellow card) 66'; Cargill (yellow card) 83' | Report | | Stadium: The New Lawn; Attendance: 3,419; Referee: Marc Edwards |

| 15 October 2022 13 | Bolton Wanderers | 0–0 | Barnsley | Bolton |
| 15:00 BST | Thomason (yellow card) 57'; Dempsey (yellow card) 70'; Bradley (yellow card) 87' | Report | Norwood (yellow card) 24'; Larkeche (yellow card) 27' | Stadium: University of Bolton Stadium; Attendance: 18,415; Referee: David Rock |

| 22 October 2022 14 | Accrington Stanley | 2–3 | Bolton Wanderers | Accrington |
| 15:00 BST | Whalley 8', (yellow card) 77'; Clark (yellow card) 42'; Johnston 48' (o.g.); McConville (yellow card) 50'; Rodgers (yellow card) 59' | Report | Rodgers 56' (o.g.); Lee 71'; Afolayan 75'; Jones (yellow card) 90+2' | Stadium: Crown Ground; Attendance: 4,829; Referee: Bobby Madden |

| 25 October 2022 15 | Bolton Wanderers | 2–1 | Burton Albion | Bolton |
| 19:45 BST | Afolayan (yellow card) 49'; Bakayoko 87'; Böðvarsson 90+8', (yellow card) 90+8' | Report | Adeboyejo (yellow card) 52'; Hughes 73' | Stadium: University of Bolton Stadium; Attendance: 16,172; Referee: Sam Allison |

| 29 October 2022 16 | Bolton Wanderers | 1–3 | Oxford United | Bolton |
| 15:00 BST | Williams (yellow card) 20'; Santos (yellow card) 69'; Charles 73' | Report | Anderson 25'; O'Donkor (yellow card) 29'; Brannagan (yellow card) 31'; McGuane (yellow card) 35'; Brown 53'; Seddon 79', (yellow card) 90+1'; Rodríguez (yellow card) 85' | Stadium: University of Bolton Stadium; Attendance: 17,281; Referee: Ollie Yates |

| 12 November 2022 17 | Cambridge United | 0–0 | Bolton Wanderers | Cambridge |
| 15:00 GMT | Jones, L. (yellow card) 14'; Digby (yellow card) 67' | Report | Kachunga (yellow card) 13'; Dempsey (yellow card) 34' (yellow-red card) 75'; Bradley (yellow card) 45'; Jones, G. (yellow card) 70'; Santos (yellow card) 83' | Stadium: Abbey Stadium; Attendance: 6,819; Referee: Darren Drysdale |

| 19 November 2022 18 | Fleetwood Town | 1–2 | Bolton Wanderers | Fleetwood |
| 15:00 GMT | Mendes Gomes 16'; Rooney (yellow card) 49'; Andrew (yellow card) 53'; Earl (yellow card) 78' | Report | Morley (yellow card) 45'; Bradley (yellow card) 78', (goal) 85'; Afolayan 90+5', (yellow card) 90+6' | Stadium: Highbury Stadium; Attendance: 4,597; Referee: David Webb |

| 2 December 2022 19 | Bolton Wanderers | 1–1 | Bristol Rovers | Bolton |
| 19:45 BST | Thomason (yellow card) 24'; Charles 90+4' | Report | Coburn 2'; Clarke (yellow card) 67'; Gibson (yellow card) 88'; Finley (yellow card) 90+6' | Stadium: University of Bolton Stadium; Attendance: 16,786; Referee: Robert Lewis |

| 10 December 2022 20 | Shrewsbury Town | 3–2 | Bolton Wanderers | Shrewsbury |
| 12:30 GMT | Street 2', (yellow card) 73'; Saydee (yellow card) 65', (goal) 79'; Maroši (yellow card) 70'; Shipley (yellow card) 73'; Dunkley 90+2' | Report | Charles 13', 71' (pen.); Sheehan (yellow card) 45+1' | Stadium: New Meadow; Attendance: 7,098; Referee: Craig Hicks |

| 17 December 2022 21 | Bolton Wanderers | 2–0 | Exeter City | Bolton |
| 15:00 BST | Bradley 8'; Charles 26' | Report | Sparkes (yellow card) 90+3' | Stadium: University of Bolton Stadium; Attendance: 19,942; Referee: Scott Oldham |

| 27 December 2022 22 | Bolton Wanderers | 0–0 | Derby County | Bolton |
| 15:00 BST | Bradley (yellow card) 61'; Aimson (yellow card) 89' | Report | Forsyth (yellow card) 26' | Stadium: University of Bolton Stadium; Attendance: 25,428; Referee: Sam Barrott |

| 30 December 2022 23 | Lincoln City | 1–1 | Bolton Wanderers | Lincoln |
| 19:45 GMT | House 10'; Poole (yellow card) 22'; Mandroiu (yellow card) 43'; Walsh (yellow card) 57' (yellow-red card) 61'; Diamond (yellow card) 63'; Virtue (yellow card) 89' | Report | Bradley (yellow card) 52'; Toal 58' | Stadium: Sincil Bank; Attendance: 9,047; Referee: Geoff Eltringham |

| 2 January 2023 24 | Barnsley | 0–3 | Bolton Wanderers | Barnsley |
| 15:00 GMT | Andersen (red card) 11' | Report | Charles 12' (pen.); Böðvarsson 41'; Dempsey 76'; Johnston (yellow card) 82'; Toal (yellow card) 90+3' | Stadium: Oakwell; Attendance: 13,913; Referee: Sebastian Stockbridge |

| 7 January 2023 25 | Bolton Wanderers | 0–0 | Plymouth Argyle | Bolton |
| 15:00 BST | Böðvarsson (yellow card) 70' | Report | Edwards (yellow card) 70' (yellow-red card) 90+7'; Wilson (yellow card) 70'; Cooper (yellow card) 90+5' | Stadium: University of Bolton Stadium; Attendance: 18,638; Referee: Declan Bourne |

| 14 January 2023 26 | Bolton Wanderers | 3–0 | Portsmouth | Bolton |
| 15:00 BST | Charles 15'; Lee 48'; Toal 71' | Report | Morrell (yellow card) 85' | Stadium: University of Bolton Stadium; Attendance: 17,977; Referee: Geoff Eltringham |

| 21 January 2023 27 | Derby County | 2–1 | Bolton Wanderers | Derby |
| 15:00 GMT | Mendez-Laing 16'; Hourihane (yellow card) 45+1', (goal) 72' | Report | Johnston (yellow card) 16'; Sadlier 90+3' | Stadium: Pride Park Stadium; Attendance: 30,004; Referee: Jeremy Simpson |

| 24 January 2023 28 | Bolton Wanderers | 1–0 | Forest Green Rovers | Bolton |
| 15:00 BST | Charles 6', (red card) 28'; Morley (yellow card) 46' | Report | Cooper (yellow card) 45+4' | Stadium: University of Bolton Stadium; Attendance: 16,329; Referee: Tom Nield |

| 28 January 2023 29 | Charlton Athletic | 1–2 | Bolton Wanderers | Charlton |
| 12:30 GMT | Morgan 46'; Bonne (yellow card) 75' | Report | Morley 4'; Charles 68'; Lee (yellow card) 72'; Sheehan (yellow card) 83'; Trafford (yellow card) 90+6' | Stadium: The Valley; Attendance: 14,458; Referee: Carl Brook |

| 4 February 2023 30 | Bolton Wanderers | 1–0 | Cheltenham Town | Bolton |
| 15:00 GMT | Dempsey 80'; Bradley (yellow card) 84' | Report | Broom (yellow card) 31'; Williams (yellow card) 59'; Keena (yellow card) 86' | Stadium: University of Bolton Stadium; Attendance: 17,736; Referee: Sunny Sukhvir Gill |

| 11 February 2023 31 | Peterborough United | 0–5 | Bolton Wanderers | Peterborough |
| 15:00 GMT | Kyprianou (yellow card) 13'; Poku (yellow card) 35'; Taylor (yellow card) 54' | Report | Santos 12', 77', (yellow card) 55'; Charles 42' (pen.), 47', 51' (pen.), (yellow card) 45+1'; Shoretire (yellow card) 56' | Stadium: London Road Stadium; Attendance: 9,247; Referee: Lee Swabey |

| 14 February 2023 32 | Bolton Wanderers | 5–0 | Milton Keynes Dons | Bolton |
| 19:45 GMT | Santos 7'; Mbete 21'; Jones 28'; Toal 62'; Williams 90+2' | Report | | Stadium: University of Bolton Stadium; Attendance: 16,634; Referee: Marc Edwards |

| 18 February 2023 33 | Wycombe Wanderers | 1–0 | Bolton Wanderers | High Wycombe |
| 15:00 GMT | Obita (yellow card) 1'; Wing 45+8'; Scowen (yellow card) 89' | Report | Shoretire (yellow card) 53'; Morley (yellow card) 74' | Stadium: Adams Park; Attendance: 6,544; Referee: Andy Woolmer |

| 25 February 2023 34 | Bolton Wanderers | 2–1 | Port Vale | Bolton |
| 15:00 GMT | Adeboyejo 18'; Sheehan 27' | Report | Harrison 8' | Stadium: University of Bolton Stadium; Attendance: 19,857; Referee: Will Finnie |

| 28 February 2023 35 | Portsmouth | 3–1 | Bolton Wanderers | Portsmouth |
| 19:45 GMT | Curtis (yellow card) 71'; Towler 73', 84'; Bishop 87'; Rafferty (yellow card) 90+1' | Report | Santos (yellow card) 13'; Bradley (yellow card) 27'; Charles 48'; Lee (yellow card) 57'; Toal (yellow card) 73' | Stadium: Fratton Park; Attendance: 17,132; Referee: Stephen Martin |

| 4 March 2023 36 | Morecambe | 0–0 | Bolton Wanderers | Morecambe |
| 12:30 GMT | Shaw (yellow card) 65' | Report | | Stadium: Globe Arena; Attendance: 5,211; Referee: Oliver Langford |

| 11 March 2023 37 | Bolton Wanderers | 0–2 | Ipswich Town | Bolton |
| 15:00 GMT | Morley (yellow card) 29'; Dempsey (yellow card) 81' | Report | Hirst 44', (yellow card) 65'; Luongo (yellow card) 45+1'; Walton (yellow card) 50'; Woolfenden (yellow card) 52'; Broadhead (yellow card) 64'; Burgess 68' | Stadium: University of Bolton Stadium; Attendance: 20,532; Referee: Neil Hair |

| 17 March 2023 38 | Sheffield Wednesday | 1–1 | Bolton Wanderers | Sheffield |
| 19:45 GMT | Gregory 11'; Bannan (yellow card) 77' | Report | Adeboyejo 36'; Santos (yellow card) 69' | Stadium: Hillsborough Stadium; Attendance: 29,230; Referee: Sam Purkiss |

| 7 April 2023 39 | Exeter City | 0–1 | Bolton Wanderers | Exeter |
| 15:00 BST | | Report | Bradley 27'; Mbete (yellow card) 76'; Thomason (yellow card) 82'; Nlundulu (yellow card) 90+2' | Stadium: St James Park; Attendance: 7,530; Referee: Craig Hicks |

| 10 April 2023 40 | Bolton Wanderers | 1–1 | Cambridge United | Bolton |
| 15:00 BST | Johnston (yellow card) 56'; John 67'; Bradley (yellow card) 71'; Mbete (yellow card) 90+4' | Report | Smith (yellow card) 51', (goal) 90+5' | Stadium: University of Bolton Stadium; Attendance: 24,377; Referee: David Rock |

| 15 April 2023 41 | Oxford United | 0–1 | Bolton Wanderers | Oxford |
| 15:00 BST | Murphy (yellow card) 36'; O'Donkor (yellow card) 90+4' | Report | Charles 7'; Trafford (yellow card) 39'; Williams (yellow card) 45'; Johnston (yellow card) 56'; Sheehan (yellow card) 60'; Kachunga (yellow card) 64' | Stadium: Kassam Stadium; Attendance: 9,506; Referee: Seb Stockbridge |

| 18 April 2023 42 | Burton Albion | 1–1 | Bolton Wanderers | Burton upon Trent |
| 19:45 BST | Powell (yellow card) 55'; Walker 59' | Report | Adeboyejo 5'; Williams (yellow card) 90+5' | Stadium: Pirelli Stadium; Attendance: 3,328; Referee: Andrew Kitchen |

| 22 April 2023 43 | Bolton Wanderers | 1–0 | Shrewsbury Town | Bolton |
| 15:00 BST | Sheehan 63'; Williams (yellow card) 90+2' | Report | Winchester (yellow card) 58'; Bowman (yellow card) 90+2' | Stadium: University of Bolton Stadium; Attendance: 18,596; Referee: Tom Reeves |

| 25 April 2023 44 | Bolton Wanderers | 0–1 | Accrington Stanley | Bolton |
| 19:45 BST | | Report | Hamilton 42' | Stadium: University of Bolton Stadium; Attendance: 17,406; Referee: James Linington |

| 29 April 2023 45 | Bolton Wanderers | 2–0 | Fleetwood Town | Bolton |
| 15:00 BST | Omochere 18' (o.g.); Williams (yellow card) 58'; Lee (yellow card) 64'; Dempsey 78' | Report | Stockley (red card) 58'; Vela (yellow card) 65'; Warrington (yellow card) 67'; Marriott (yellow card) 75' | Stadium: University of Bolton Stadium; Attendance: 20,531; Referee: Benjamin Speedie |

| 7 May 2023 46 | Bristol Rovers | 2–3 | Bolton Wanderers | Bristol |
| 12:00 GMT | Hoole 28'; Marquis 85'; Connolly (yellow card) 90+3' | Report | Sheehan (yellow card) 11'; Shoretire 24'; Thomason (yellow card) 52'; Nlundulu 70', (yellow card) 90+3'; Morley 77' | Stadium: Memorial Stadium; Attendance: 10,086; Referee: Will Finnie |

==== Play-offs ====
Bolton Wanderers finished 5th in the regular 2022–23 EFL League One season, so were drawn against 4th placed Barnsley in the Play-off Semi Final. The first leg took place at the University of Bolton Stadium and the second leg took place at Oakwell.

| 13 May 2023 Semi-Final, First leg | Bolton Wanderers | 1–1 | Barnsley | Bolton |
| 15:00 BST | Charles 67' | Report | Cadden 63' | Stadium: University of Bolton Stadium; Attendance: 23,450; Referee: Andrew Kitchen |

| 19 May 2023 Semi-Final, Second leg | Barnsley | 1–0 (2–1 agg.) | Bolton Wanderers | Barnsley |
| 20:00 GMT | Kitching 24'; Cole (yellow card) 57' | Report | Dempsey (yellow card) 42'; Santos (yellow card) 81' | Stadium: Oakwell; Attendance: 16,274; Referee: Michael Salisbury |

=== FA Cup ===
Bolton were drawn at home to Barnsley in the first round. For the match, Bolton wore a remade version of the shirt they wore 100 years prior to celebrate the centenary anniversary of them winning the 1923 FA Cup Final.

Win Draw Loss Fixtures

| 5 November 2022 First round | Bolton Wanderers | 1–2 | Barnsley | Bolton |
| 14:00 GMT | Thomason (yellow card) 61'; Böðvarsson 80' | Report | Santos 6' (o.g.); Phillips 33' (yellow card) 76'; Kane (yellow card) 37'; Kitching (yellow card) 50'; Walton (yellow card) 87'; Andersen (yellow card) 90' | Stadium: University of Bolton Stadium; Attendance: 5,999; Referee: Carl Boyeson |

=== EFL Cup ===
Bolton entered the EFL Cup at the first round stage, along with all other League One and League Two club and the majority of Championship clubs. The draw was made on 23 June and saw Bolton drawn at home to Salford City. In the next round, Bolton were handed another home tie against Aston Villa.

Win Draw Loss Fixtures

| 9 August 2022 First round | Bolton Wanderers | 5–1 | Salford City | Bolton |
| 19:45 BST | Kachunga 31'; Böðvarsson 42'; Sadlier 61'; Bradley 77'; Afolayan 86'; Thomason (red card) 90+2' | Report | Thomas-Asante 23'; Vassell (yellow card) 70'; Watson (yellow card) 74'; Bolton (yellow card) 82' | Stadium: University of Bolton Stadium; Attendance: 6,505; Referee: John Brooks |

| 23 August 2022 Second round | Bolton Wanderers | 1–4 | Aston Villa | Bolton |
| 19:45 BST | Johnston (yellow card) 13'; Charles 24'; Dixon (yellow card) 61'; Kachunga (yellow card) 62' | Report | Douglas Luiz 36', (yellow card) 62'; Ings 63' (pen.); Digne 66'; Bailey 87' | Stadium: University of Bolton Stadium; Attendance: 20,064; Referee: Andrew Kitchen |

=== EFL Trophy ===
On 20 June, the initial Group stage draw was made, grouping Bolton Wanderers with Crewe Alexandra and Tranmere Rovers. On 23 June, Leeds United U21 joined them. Bolton were then drawn at home to Barrow in the second round, Manchester United U21 in the third round and to Portsmouth in the quarter-finals. The Whites were drawn away to Accrington Stanley in the semi-finals.

| Pos | Div | Team | Pld | W | PW | PL | L | GF | GA | GD | Pts | Qualification |
|---|---|---|---|---|---|---|---|---|---|---|---|---|
| 1 | L1 | Bolton Wanderers | 3 | 2 | 0 | 1 | 0 | 9 | 3 | +6 | 7 | Advance to Round 2 |
| 2 | L2 | Tranmere Rovers | 3 | 1 | 1 | 0 | 1 | 6 | 7 | −1 | 5 | Advance to Round 2 |
| 3 | ACA | Leeds United U21 | 3 | 1 | 0 | 1 | 1 | 5 | 6 | −1 | 4 | |
| 4 | L2 | Crewe Alexandra | 3 | 0 | 1 | 0 | 2 | 1 | 5 | −4 | 2 | |

Source: EFL.com

Win Draw Loss Fixtures

| 30 August 2022 Group game 1 | Bolton Wanderers | 4–1 | Crewe Alexandra | Bolton |
| 19:00 BST | Bakayoko 5'; Aimson (yellow card) 26'; Charles 78', 89'; Sadlier 86' | Report | Baker-Richardson 16' | Stadium: University of Bolton Stadium; Attendance: 2,115; Referee: Scott Oldham |

| 20 September 2022 Group game 2 | Tranmere Rovers | 2–2 (5–4 p) | Bolton Wanderers | Birkenhead |
| 19:00 BST | Morris 21'; Lewis (yellow card) 37' (goal) 40'; Simeu (yellow card) 64'; Lomax (yellow card) 71' | Report | Sadlier 72'; Carty 90+1' | Stadium: Prenton Park; Attendance: 1,779; Referee: Martin Coy |
| | Penalties |
| | Hemmings (penalty scored); Hughes (penalty scored); McAlear (penalty scored); Merrie (penalty scored); Burton (penalty scored) | | Morley (penalty scored); Afolayan (penalty scored); Isgrove (penalty missed); Sadlier (penalty scored); Sheehan (penalty scored) |

| 18 October 2022 Group game 3 | Bolton Wanderers | 3–0 | Leeds United U21 | Bolton |
| 19:00 BST | Böðvarsson 14'; Jones (yellow card) 66'; Bakayoko 78'; Sadlier 89' | Report | Perkins (yellow card) 58' | Stadium: University of Bolton Stadium; Attendance: 2,936; Referee: Peter Wright |

| 22 November 2022 Second round | Bolton Wanderers | 3–2 | Barrow | Bolton |
| 19:45 GMT | Afolayan 23'; Böðvarsson 38'; Kachunga 69' | Report | Neal (yellow card) 18'; Kay 42'; Canavan 56'; Ray (yellow card) 73' | Stadium: University of Bolton Stadium; Attendance: 2,381; Referee: Rebecca Welch |

| 13 December 2022 Third round | Bolton Wanderers | 4–0 | Manchester United U21 | Bolton |
| 19:45 GMT | Afolayan 68'; Morley 76'; Iredale (yellow card) 81'; Bakayoko 90+3'; Bradley 90+5' | Report | Murray (yellow card) 11'; Bernard (yellow card) 80' | Stadium: University of Bolton Stadium; Attendance: 4,735; Referee: Martin Coy |

| 10 January 2023 Quarter-Final | Bolton Wanderers | 1–0 | Portsmouth | Bolton |
| 19:45 GMT | Böðvarsson 17'; Johnston (yellow card) 32' | Report | Curtis (yellow card) 61' | Stadium: University of Bolton Stadium; Attendance: 4,413; Referee: Bobby Madden |

| 22 February 2023 Semi-Final | Accrington Stanley | 0–2 | Bolton Wanderers | Accrington |
| 20:00 GMT | Pressley (yellow card) 21'; McConville (red card) 22'; Coyle (yellow card) 41' | Report | Trafford (yellow card) 52'; Morley (yellow card) 64', (goal) 84'; Kachunga 82' | Stadium: Crown Ground; Attendance: 4,874; Referee: Sam Barrott |

| 2 April 2023 Final | Bolton Wanderers | 4–0 | Plymouth Argyle | London |
| 15:00 GMT | Dempsey 4'; Charles 10'; Kachunga 49'; Jones 62' | Report | Mayor (yellow card) 40'; Scarr (yellow card) 51'; Cosgrove (yellow card) 84' | Stadium: Wembley Stadium; Attendance: 79,389; Referee: Ben Toner |

== Statistics ==
As of match played 19 May 2023

| No. | Pos | Nat | Player | Total | | League One | | FA Cup | | EFL Cup | | EFL Trophy | | Play-Offs | |
| No. | Pos | Nat | Player | Apps | Goals | Apps | Goals | Apps | Goals | Apps | Goals | Apps | Goals | Apps | Goals |
Goalkeepers
| 12 | GK | (England) ENG | Joel Dixon | 7 | 0 | 1+0 | 0 | 0+0 | 0 | 2+0 | 0 | 4+0 | 0 | 0+0 | 0 |
| 19 | GK | (England) ENG | James Trafford | 52 | 0 | 45+0 | 0 | 1+0 | 0 | 0+0 | 0 | 4+0 | 0 | 2+0 | 0 |
Defenders
| 2 | DF | (Wales) WAL | Gethin Jones | 46 | 3 | 37+2 | 2 | 1+0 | 0 | 1+0 | 0 | 4+1 | 1 | 0+0 | 0 |
| 3 | DF | (Wales) WAL | Declan John | 27 | 1 | 14+5 | 1 | 0+0 | 0 | 2+0 | 0 | 5+0 | 0 | 0+1 | 0 |
| 5 | DF | (Portugal) POR | Ricardo Santos | 39 | 3 | 29+1 | 3 | 1+0 | 0 | 1+0 | 0 | 4+1 | 0 | 2+0 | 0 |
| 6 | DF | (Scotland) SCO | George Johnston | 45 | 1 | 35+1 | 1 | 0+0 | 0 | 2+0 | 0 | 3+2 | 0 | 2+0 | 0 |
| 14 | DF | (Australia) AUS | Jack Iredale | 25 | 0 | 17+2 | 0 | 1+0 | 0 | 0+1 | 0 | 4+0 | 0 | 0+0 | 0 |
| 18 | DF | (Northern Ireland) NIR | Eoin Toal | 31 | 3 | 22+0 | 3 | 0+0 | 0 | 0+0 | 0 | 6+1 | 0 | 2+0 | 0 |
| 21 | DF | (Northern Ireland) NIR | Conor Bradley | 53 | 7 | 41+0 | 5 | 1+0 | 0 | 1+1 | 1 | 3+4 | 1 | 2+0 | 0 |
| 27 | DF | (England) ENG | Randell Williams | 19 | 1 | 8+7 | 1 | 0+0 | 0 | 0+0 | 0 | 0+2 | 0 | 2+0 | 0 |
| 28 | DF | (England) ENG | Luke Mbete | 9 | 1 | 8+0 | 1 | 0+0 | 0 | 0+0 | 0 | 1+0 | 0 | 0+0 | 0 |
| 43 | DF | (England) ENG | Lamine Toure | 1 | 0 | 0+0 | 0 | 0+0 | 0 | 0+1 | 0 | 0+0 | 0 | 0+0 | 0 |
Midfielders
| 4 | MF | (Wales) WAL | MJ Williams | 35 | 0 | 20+8 | 0 | 0+0 | 0 | 2+0 | 0 | 2+3 | 0 | 0+0 | 0 |
| 8 | MF | (Wales) WAL | Josh Sheehan | 34 | 2 | 13+11 | 2 | 0+0 | 0 | 0+0 | 0 | 7+1 | 0 | 1+1 | 0 |
| 16 | MF | (England) ENG | Aaron Morley | 50 | 6 | 33+8 | 4 | 1+0 | 0 | 0+0 | 0 | 5+1 | 2 | 2+0 | 0 |
| 17 | MF | (England) ENG | Shola Shoretire | 16 | 1 | 12+4 | 1 | 0+0 | 0 | 0+0 | 0 | 0+0 | 0 | 0+0 | 0 |
| 20 | MF | (England) ENG | Kieran Lee | 41 | 3 | 21+11 | 3 | 1+0 | 0 | 2+0 | 0 | 2+3 | 0 | 0+1 | 0 |
| 22 | MF | (England) ENG | Kyle Dempsey | 47 | 6 | 32+7 | 5 | 0+1 | 0 | 0+1 | 0 | 3+1 | 1 | 2+0 | 0 |
| 23 | MF | (Wales) WAL | Lloyd Isgrove | 6 | 0 | 1+2 | 0 | 0+0 | 0 | 0+0 | 0 | 1+2 | 0 | 0+0 | 0 |
| 25 | MF | (England) ENG | George Thomason | 25 | 0 | 13+7 | 0 | 1+0 | 0 | 1+0 | 0 | 1+1 | 0 | 1+0 | 0 |
| 38 | MF | (Malawi) MAW | Nelson Khumbeni | 1 | 0 | 0+0 | 0 | 0+0 | 0 | 0+1 | 0 | 0+0 | 0 | 0+0 | 0 |
Forwards
| 9 | FW | (Iceland) ISL | Jón Daði Böðvarsson | 27 | 8 | 8+13 | 3 | 0+1 | 1 | 1+0 | 1 | 4+0 | 3 | 0+0 | 0 |
| 10 | FW | (Northern Ireland) NIR | Dion Charles | 52 | 21 | 38+4 | 16 | 1+0 | 0 | 1+0 | 1 | 5+1 | 3 | 2+0 | 1 |
| 11 | FW | (England) ENG | Dan Nlundulu | 16 | 1 | 3+11 | 1 | 0+0 | 0 | 0+0 | 0 | 0+0 | 0 | 1+1 | 0 |
| 24 | FW | (Democratic Republic of the Congo) COD | Elias Kachunga | 50 | 4 | 14+24 | 0 | 0+1 | 0 | 2+0 | 1 | 4+3 | 3 | 1+1 | 0 |
| 29 | FW | (Nigeria) NGR | Victor Adeboyejo | 18 | 3 | 10+6 | 3 | 0+0 | 0 | 0+0 | 0 | 0+0 | 0 | 0+2 | 0 |
| 35 | FW | (England) ENG | Cameron Jerome | 12 | 0 | 1+9 | 0 | 0+0 | 0 | 0+0 | 0 | 0+1 | 0 | 0+1 | 0 |
Player(s) who left the club
| 11 | FW | (Sierra Leone) SLE | Amadou Bakayoko | 27 | 4 | 5+15 | 1 | 0+1 | 0 | 0+1 | 0 | 1+4 | 3 | 0+0 | 0 |
| 15 | DF | (England) ENG | Will Aimson | 17 | 0 | 9+2 | 0 | 0+0 | 0 | 2+0 | 0 | 4+0 | 0 | 0+0 | 0 |
| 17 | FW | (England) ENG | Dapo Afolayan | 29 | 6 | 13+9 | 3 | 1+0 | 0 | 1+1 | 1 | 3+1 | 2 | 0+0 | 0 |
| 30 | DF | (Wales) WAL | Owen Beck | 9 | 0 | 2+3 | 0 | 0+1 | 0 | 0+0 | 0 | 2+1 | 0 | 0+0 | 0 |
Player(s) out on loan
| 7 | MF | (Republic of Ireland) IRL | Kieran Sadlier | 28 | 5 | 1+18 | 1 | 1+0 | 0 | 1+1 | 1 | 5+1 | 3 | 0+0 | 0 |
| 39 | FW | (Republic of Ireland) IRL | Conor Carty | 1 | 1 | 0+0 | 0 | 0+0 | 0 | 0+0 | 0 | 0+1 | 1 | 0+0 | 0 |

=== Goals record ===
As of match played 13 May 2023

| Rank | No. | Nat. | Po. | Name | League One | FA Cup | EFL Cup | EFL Trophy | Play-Offs | Total |
|---|---|---|---|---|---|---|---|---|---|---|
| 1 | 10 | (Northern Ireland) | CF | Dion Charles | 16 | 0 | 1 | 3 | 1 | 21 |
| 2 | 9 | (Iceland) | CF | Jón Daði Böðvarsson | 3 | 1 | 1 | 3 | 0 | 8 |
| 3 | 21 | (Northern Ireland) | RB | Conor Bradley | 5 | 0 | 1 | 1 | 0 | 7 |
| 4 | 16 | (England) | CM | Aaron Morley | 4 | 0 | 0 | 2 | 0 | 6 |
| 4 | 22 | (England) | CM | Kyle Dempsey | 5 | 0 | 0 | 1 | 0 | 6 |
| 4 | - | (England) | LW | Dapo Afolayan | 3 | 0 | 1 | 2 | 0 | 6 |
| 7 | 7 | (Republic of Ireland) | RW | Kieran Sadlier | 1 | 0 | 1 | 3 | 0 | 5 |
| 8 | 24 | (Democratic Republic of the Congo) | CF | Elias Kachunga | 0 | 0 | 1 | 3 | 0 | 4 |
| 8 | - | (Sierra Leone) | CF | Amadou Bakayoko | 1 | 0 | 0 | 3 | 0 | 4 |
| 10 | 2 | (Wales) | RB | Gethin Jones | 2 | 0 | 0 | 1 | 0 | 3 |
| 10 | 5 | (Portugal) | CB | Ricardo Santos | 3 | 0 | 0 | 0 | 0 | 3 |
| 10 | 18 | (Northern Ireland) | CB | Eoin Toal | 3 | 0 | 0 | 0 | 0 | 3 |
| 10 | 20 | (England) | CM | Kieran Lee | 3 | 0 | 0 | 0 | 0 | 3 |
| 10 | 29 | (Nigeria) | CF | Victor Adeboyejo | 3 | 0 | 0 | 0 | 0 | 3 |
| 15 | 8 | (Wales) | CM | Josh Sheehan | 2 | 0 | 0 | 0 | 0 | 2 |
| 16 | 3 | (Wales) | LB | Declan John | 1 | 0 | 0 | 0 | 0 | 1 |
| 16 | 6 | (Scotland) | CB | George Johnston | 1 | 0 | 0 | 0 | 0 | 1 |
| 16 | 11 | (England) | CF | Dan Nlundulu | 1 | 0 | 0 | 0 | 0 | 1 |
| 16 | 17 | (England) | AM | Shola Shoretire | 1 | 0 | 0 | 0 | 0 | 1 |
| 16 | 27 | (England) | LB | Randell Williams | 1 | 0 | 0 | 0 | 0 | 1 |
| 16 | 28 | (England) | CB | Luke Mbete | 1 | 0 | 0 | 0 | 0 | 1 |
| 16 | 39 | (Republic of Ireland) | CF | Conor Carty | 0 | 0 | 0 | 1 | 0 | 1 |
| Own Goals | | | | | 2 | 0 | 0 | 0 | 0 | 2 |
| Total | | | | | 62 | 1 | 6 | 23 | 1 | 93 |

=== Disciplinary record ===
As of match played 19 May 2023

| Rank | No. | Nat. | Po. | Name | League One | | | FA Cup | | | EFL Cup | | | EFL Trophy | | | Play-Offs | | | Total | | |
| Rank | No. | Nat. | Po. | Name | Booked | (yellow card) (yellow-red card) | Sent off (straight red) | Booked | (yellow card) (yellow-red card) | Sent off (straight red) | Booked | (yellow card) (yellow-red card) | Sent off (straight red) | Booked | (yellow card) (yellow-red card) | Sent off (straight red) | Booked | (yellow card) (yellow-red card) | Sent off (straight red) | Booked | (yellow card) (yellow-red card) | Sent off (straight red) |
|---|---|---|---|---|---|---|---|---|---|---|---|---|---|---|---|---|---|---|---|---|---|---|
| 1 | 21 | (Northern Ireland) | RB | Conor Bradley | 12 | 0 | 0 | 0 | 0 | 0 | 0 | 0 | 0 | 0 | 0 | 0 | 0 | 0 | 0 | 12 | 0 | 0 |
| 2 | 5 | (Portugal) | CB | Ricardo Santos | 5 | 1 | 0 | 0 | 0 | 0 | 0 | 0 | 0 | 0 | 0 | 0 | 1 | 0 | 0 | 6 | 1 | 0 |
| 2 | 25 | (England) | CM | George Thomason | 5 | 0 | 0 | 1 | 0 | 0 | 0 | 0 | 1 | 0 | 0 | 0 | 0 | 0 | 0 | 6 | 0 | 1 |
| 4 | 4 | (Wales) | CM | MJ Williams | 8 | 0 | 0 | 0 | 0 | 0 | 0 | 0 | 0 | 0 | 0 | 0 | 0 | 0 | 0 | 8 | 0 | 0 |
| 4 | 6 | (Scotland) | CB | George Johnston | 6 | 0 | 0 | 0 | 0 | 0 | 1 | 0 | 0 | 1 | 0 | 0 | 0 | 0 | 0 | 8 | 0 | 0 |
| 6 | 16 | (England) | CM | Aaron Morley | 5 | 0 | 0 | 0 | 0 | 0 | 0 | 0 | 0 | 1 | 0 | 0 | 0 | 0 | 0 | 6 | 0 | 0 |
| 6 | 22 | (England) | CM | Kyle Dempsey | 2 | 1 | 0 | 0 | 0 | 0 | 0 | 0 | 0 | 0 | 0 | 0 | 1 | 0 | 0 | 3 | 1 | 0 |
| 8 | 2 | (Wales) | RB | Gethin Jones | 3 | 0 | 0 | 0 | 0 | 0 | 0 | 0 | 0 | 1 | 0 | 0 | 0 | 0 | 0 | 4 | 0 | 0 |
| 8 | 8 | (Wales) | CM | Josh Sheehan | 4 | 0 | 0 | 0 | 0 | 0 | 0 | 0 | 0 | 0 | 0 | 0 | 0 | 0 | 0 | 4 | 0 | 0 |
| 8 | 10 | (Northern Ireland) | CF | Dion Charles | 1 | 0 | 1 | 0 | 0 | 0 | 0 | 0 | 0 | 0 | 0 | 0 | 0 | 0 | 0 | 1 | 0 | 1 |
| 8 | 19 | (England) | GK | James Trafford | 3 | 0 | 0 | 0 | 0 | 0 | 0 | 0 | 0 | 1 | 0 | 0 | 0 | 0 | 0 | 4 | 0 | 0 |
| 12 | 14 | (Australia) | LB | Jack Iredale | 2 | 0 | 0 | 0 | 0 | 0 | 0 | 0 | 0 | 1 | 0 | 0 | 0 | 0 | 0 | 3 | 0 | 0 |
| 12 | 20 | (England) | CM | Kieran Lee | 3 | 0 | 0 | 0 | 0 | 0 | 0 | 0 | 0 | 0 | 0 | 0 | 0 | 0 | 0 | 3 | 0 | 0 |
| 12 | 24 | (Democratic Republic of the Congo) | CF | Elias Kachunga | 2 | 0 | 0 | 0 | 0 | 0 | 1 | 0 | 0 | 0 | 0 | 0 | 0 | 0 | 0 | 3 | 0 | 0 |
| 15 | 7 | (Republic of Ireland) | RW | Kieran Sadlier | 2 | 0 | 0 | 0 | 0 | 0 | 0 | 0 | 0 | 0 | 0 | 0 | 0 | 0 | 0 | 2 | 0 | 0 |
| 15 | 9 | (Iceland) | CF | Jón Daði Böðvarsson | 2 | 0 | 0 | 0 | 0 | 0 | 0 | 0 | 0 | 0 | 0 | 0 | 0 | 0 | 0 | 2 | 0 | 0 |
| 15 | 11 | (England) | CF | Dan Nlundulu | 2 | 0 | 0 | 0 | 0 | 0 | 0 | 0 | 0 | 0 | 0 | 0 | 0 | 0 | 0 | 2 | 0 | 0 |
| 15 | 17 | (England) | AM | Shola Shoretire | 2 | 0 | 0 | 0 | 0 | 0 | 0 | 0 | 0 | 0 | 0 | 0 | 0 | 0 | 0 | 2 | 0 | 0 |
| 15 | 18 | (Northern Ireland) | CB | Eoin Toal | 2 | 0 | 0 | 0 | 0 | 0 | 0 | 0 | 0 | 0 | 0 | 0 | 0 | 0 | 0 | 2 | 0 | 0 |
| 15 | 28 | (England) | CB | Luke Mbete | 2 | 0 | 0 | 0 | 0 | 0 | 0 | 0 | 0 | 0 | 0 | 0 | 0 | 0 | 0 | 2 | 0 | 0 |
| 15 | - | (England) | LW | Dapo Afolayan | 2 | 0 | 0 | 0 | 0 | 0 | 0 | 0 | 0 | 0 | 0 | 0 | 0 | 0 | 0 | 2 | 0 | 0 |
| 15 | - | (England) | CB | Will Aimson | 1 | 0 | 0 | 0 | 0 | 0 | 0 | 0 | 0 | 1 | 0 | 0 | 0 | 0 | 0 | 2 | 0 | 0 |
| 23 | 3 | (Wales) | LB | Declan John | 1 | 0 | 0 | 0 | 0 | 0 | 0 | 0 | 0 | 0 | 0 | 0 | 0 | 0 | 0 | 1 | 0 | 0 |
| 23 | 12 | (England) | GK | Joel Dixon | 0 | 0 | 0 | 0 | 0 | 0 | 1 | 0 | 0 | 0 | 0 | 0 | 0 | 0 | 0 | 1 | 0 | 0 |
| 23 | 27 | (England) | LB | Randell Williams | 1 | 0 | 0 | 0 | 0 | 0 | 0 | 0 | 0 | 0 | 0 | 0 | 0 | 0 | 0 | 1 | 0 | 0 |
| Total | | | | | 75 | 2 | 1 | 1 | 0 | 0 | 3 | 0 | 1 | 6 | 0 | 0 | 2 | 0 | 0 | 87 | 2 | 2 |

== Transfers ==
=== In ===
| Date | Pos. | Player | Transferred from | Fee | Ref |
|---|---|---|---|---|---|
| 1 July 2022 (Note: The transfer was announced on 17 June, and would become official on July 1 once his Wolverhampton Wanderers contract expired) | CF | (Republic of Ireland) Conor Carty | (England) Wolverhampton Wanderers | Free transfer | |
| 1 July 2022 (Note: The transfer was announced on 17 June, and would become official on July 1 once his Warrington Town contract expired) | LW | (England) Matty Grivosti | (England) Warrington Town | Free transfer | |
| 1 July 2022 (Note: The transfer was announced on 9 May, and would become official on July 1 once his Cambridge United contract expired) | LB | (Australia) Jack Iredale | (England) Cambridge United | Free transfer | |
| 1 July 2022 (Note: The transfer was announced on 16 June, and would become official on July 1 once his Norwich City contract expired) | DM | (Malawi) Nelson Khumbeni | (England) Norwich City | Free transfer | |
| 1 July 2022 (Note: The transfer was announced on 16 June, and would become official on July 1 once his Reading contract expired) | RB | (England) Lynford Sackey | (England) Reading | Free transfer | |
| 1 July 2022 (Note: The transfer was announced on 24 June, and would become official on July 1 once his Gillingham contract expired) | CF | (England) Gerald Sithole | (England) Gillingham | Free transfer | |
| 1 July 2022 (Note: The transfer was announced on 17 June, and would become official on July 1 once his Manchester United contract expired) | AM | (England) Connor Stanley | (England) Manchester United | Free transfer | |
| 15 July 2022 | CB | (Republic of Ireland) Eric Yoro | (Republic of Ireland) UCD | Undisclosed | |
| 20 July 2022 | CB | (Northern Ireland) Eoin Toal | (Northern Ireland) Derry City | Undisclosed | |
| 12 October 2022 | GK | (England) Mackenzie Chapman | (England) Oxford United | Free transfer | |
| 5 January 2023 | LB | (England) Randell Williams | (England) Hull City | Undisclosed | |
| 27 January 2023 | CF | (England) Cameron Jerome | (England) Luton Town | Free transfer | |
| 27 January 2023 | CF | (Nigeria) Victor Adeboyejo | (England) Burton Albion | Undisclosed (Note: The transfer was reported to be around £500,000 by The Bolton News.) | |

=== Out ===
| Date | Pos. | Player | Transferred to | Fee | Source |
|---|---|---|---|---|---|
| 30 June 2022 | GK | (England) Matthew Alexander | Unattached | Released | |
| 30 June 2022 | CB | (England) Alex Baptiste | (Republic of Ireland) Waterford | Released | |
| 30 June 2022 | CF | (England) Nathan Delfouneso | (England) Accrington Stanley | Released | |
| 30 June 2022 | CB | (England) Liam Edwards | (England) Chester | Free | |
| 30 June 2022 | FW | (England) Jay Fitzmartin | (England) Atherton Collieries | Released | |
| 30 June 2022 | LB | (Guyana) Liam Gordon | (England) Walsall | Free | |
| 30 June 2022 | CB | (Guyana) Reiss Greenidge | (England) Maidstone United | Released | |
| 30 June 2022 | FW | (England) Mitchell Henry | (England) Irlam | Released | |
| 30 June 2022 | CM | (England) Andrew Tutte | Promoted to B Team Player-coach | —N/a | |
| 30 June 2022 | CM | (England) Max Wilcox | (England) Brentford | Released | |
| 13 July 2022 | AM | (England) Ronan Darcy | (England) Swindon Town | Undisclosed | |
| 12 January 2023 | CF | (Sierra Leone) Amadou Bakayoko | (England) Forest Green Rovers | Undisclosed | |
| 19 January 2023 | LW | (England) Dapo Afolayan | (Germany) St. Pauli | Undisclosed (Note: The transfer was reported to be around £500,000 by The Bolton News.) | |
| 27 January 2023 | CB | (England) Will Aimson | (England) Exeter City | Undisclosed | |

=== Loans in ===
| Date | Pos. | Player | Loaned from | On loan until | Source |
|---|---|---|---|---|---|
| 15 June 2022 | GK | (England) James Trafford | (England) Manchester City | End of season | |
| 21 June 2022 | RB | (Northern Ireland) Conor Bradley | (England) Liverpool | End of season | |
| 31 August 2022 | LB | (Wales) Owen Beck | (England) Liverpool | 26 January 2023 | |
| 9 January 2023 | CF | (England) Dan Nlundulu | (England) Southampton | End of season | |
| 19 January 2023 | AM | (England) Shola Shoretire | (England) Manchester United | End of season | |
| 31 January 2023 | CB | (England) Luke Mbete | (England) Manchester City | End of season | |

=== Loans out ===
| Date | Pos. | Player | Loaned to | On loan until | Source |
|---|---|---|---|---|---|
| 5 August 2022 | LW | (England) Matty Grivosti | (England) Yeovil Town | 2 September 2022 | |
| 26 August 2022 | FW | (England) Finlay Lockett | (England) Atherton Collieries | 14 October 2022 | |
| 26 August 2022 | CM | (England) Arran Pettifer | (England) Atherton Collieries | End of Season | |
| 18 October 2022 | AM | (England) Connor Stanley | (England) Bamber Bridge | 18 November 2022 | |
| 21 October 2022 | CF | (Republic of Ireland) Conor Carty | (England) Oldham Athletic | 18 November 2022 | |
| 8 November 2022 | RB | (England) Adam Senior | (England) AFC Telford United | 2 January 2022 | |
| 18 November 2022 | AM | (England) Connor Stanley | (England) United of Manchester | 18 December 2022 | |
| 18 November 2022 | CF | (Republic of Ireland) Conor Carty | (England) Gateshead | 3 January 2023 | |
| 25 November 2022 | LB | (England) Max Conway | (England) Buxton | End of season | |
| 25 November 2022 | CB | (England) Lamine Toure | (England) Lancaster City | 3 January 2023 | |
| 30 November 2022 | LW | (England) Matty Grivosti | (England) Radcliffe | End of season | |
| 26 December 2022 | CM | (England) Matthew Tweedley | (England) Bamber Bridge | 26 January 2023 | |
| 6 January 2023 | GK | (England) Luke Hutchinson | (England) Bamber Bridge | 6 March 2023 | |
| 18 January 2023 | RB | (England) Adam Senior | (England) FC Halifax Town | End of season | |
| 27 January 2023 | RW | (Republic of Ireland) Kieran Sadlier | (England) Leyton Orient | End of season | |
| 4 February 2023 | AM | (England) Connor Stanley | (England) Bamber Bridge | End of season | |
| 4 February 2023 | CF | (Republic of Ireland) Conor Carty | (Republic of Ireland) St Patrick's Athletic | 30 November 2023 | |
| 7 February 2023 | CM | (England) Matthew Tweedley | (England) Lancaster City | End of season | |
| 18 February 2023 | GK | (England) Mackenzie Chapman | (England) Atherton Collieries | End of season | |
| 22 March 2023 | GK | (England) Luke Hutchinson | (England) Radcliffe | End of season | |
