= Luke Mbete =

English footballer (born 2003)

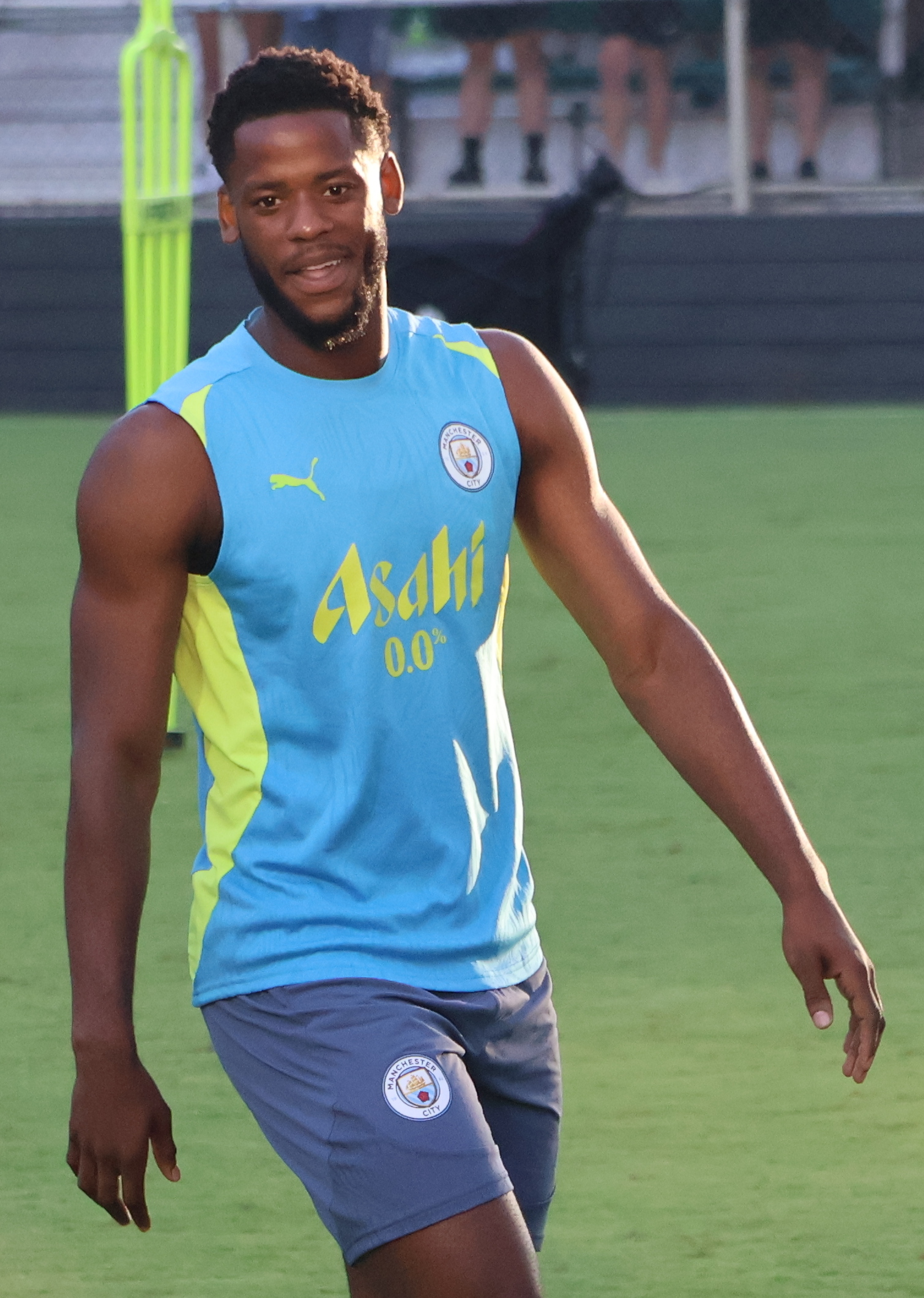
- Mbete training with Manchester City in 2024

Personal information
- Full name: Luke Mbete-Tabu
- Date of birth: 18 September 2003 (age 23)
- Place of birth: Westminster, England
- Height: 6 ft 1 in (1.85 m)
- Position: Defender

Youth career
- 2012–2016: Brentford
- 2016–2021: Manchester City

Senior career*
| Years | Team | Apps | (Gls) |
| 2021–2026 | Manchester City | 0 | (0) |
| 2022–2023 | → Huddersfield Town (loan) | 6 | (0) |
| 2023 | → Bolton Wanderers (loan) | 8 | (1) |
| 2023–2024 | → Den Bosch (loan) | 23 | (2) |
| 2024–2025 | → Northampton Town (loan) | 13 | (0) |

International career^{‡}
| 2017 | England U15 | 1 | (0) |
| 2018 | England U16 | 3 | (0) |
| 2021 | England U19 | 4 | (0) |
| 2023 | England U20 | 1 | (0) |
| 2022 | England U21 | 2 | (0) |
- * Club domestic league appearances and goals as of 07:32, 4 May 2025 (UTC) ‡ National team caps and goals as of 19:59, 25 March 2023 (UTC)

Luke Mbete-Tabu (born 18 September 2003) is an English professional footballer who plays as a left-back or centre-back, most recently for Premier League club Manchester City.

== Early life ==
Luke Mbete was born in Westminster, England to Congolese parents. He has 3 siblings and is a twin. He has a fervent passion for football, and it showed evidently as he partook in football matches during primary school and secondary school. He attended Jesus and Mary Convent and St Mary Magdalen Junior School and St Gregory's Catholic Science College in Harrow, England.

== Club career ==
Born in London, Mbete joined Brentford as a child. When they closed their academy in 2016 he joined Manchester City. In November 2020 he started for the City side that defeated Chelsea in the final of the FA Youth Cup. On 21 September 2021, Mbete made his professional debut when he was named in the starting line up for Manchester City's EFL Cup tie against Wycombe Wanderers.

Mbete was loaned to Huddersfield Town for the 2022–23 season. However, the loan was cut short and on 31 January 2023, he joined Bolton Wanderers on loan for the remainder of the season. On 14 February, he scored his first goal in senior football, scoring the second goal in a 5–0 win over Milton Keynes Dons. On 2 April, Bolton won 4–0 against Plymouth Argyle in the 2023 EFL Trophy final. He did not make the match day squad, though still received a medal as he had played in the semi-final.

On 26 August 2023, Mbete moved on a season-long loan to Den Bosch in the Netherlands.

On 12 August 2024, Mbete signed for Northampton Town on another season-long loan. His season was hampered by a hamstring injury sustained whilst playing against Bolton Wanderers on 1 October. He returned to first team action on 22 March 2025 against Blackpool.

Mbete departed Manchester City ahead of the 2026–27 season.

== International career ==
Born in England, Mbete is of Congolese descent. He has represented England at youth level.

On 16 September 2022, Mbete received his first call up to the England U21 squad. He made his debut as a 90th minute substitute for Taylor Harwood-Bellis during the 2–0 win over Italy in Pescara on 22 September.

On 25 March 2023, Mbete made his debut for the England U20 team during a 4–2 win over USA in Marbella.

== Career statistics ==
As of match played 3 May 2025

Appearances and goals by club, season and competition
| Club | Season | League | | | National Cup | | League Cup | | Europe | | Other | | Total | |
| Club | Season | Division | Apps | Goals | Apps | Goals | Apps | Goals | Apps | Goals | Apps | Goals | Apps | Goals |
|---|---|---|---|---|---|---|---|---|---|---|---|---|---|---|
| Manchester City U21 | 2020–21 | — | | | — | | — | | — | | 3 (Note: Appearance(s) in EFL Trophy) | 0 | 3 | 0 |
| Manchester City U21 | 2021–22 | — | | | — | | — | | — | | 2 | 0 | 2 | 0 |
| Manchester City U21 | Total | | — | | — | | — | | — | | 5 | 0 | 5 | 0 |
| Manchester City | 2021–22 | Premier League | 0 | 0 | 1 | 0 | 1 | 0 | 1 (Note: Appearance(s) in UEFA Champions League) | 0 | 0 | 0 | 3 | 0 |
| Huddersfield Town (loan) | 2022–23 | Championship | 6 | 0 | — | | — | | — | | — | | 6 | 0 |
| Bolton Wanderers (loan) | 2022–23 | League One | 8 | 1 | — | | — | | — | | 1 | 0 | 9 | 1 |
| Den Bosch (loan) | 2023–24 | Eerste Divisie | 23 | 2 | 1 | 0 | — | | — | | — | | 24 | 2 |
| Northampton Town (loan) | 2024–25 | League One | 13 | 0 | 0 | 0 | 1 | 0 | — | | — | | 14 | 0 |
| Career total | | | 50 | 3 | 2 | 0 | 2 | 0 | 1 | 0 | 6 | 0 | 61 | 3 |

== Honours ==
Bolton Wanderers

- EFL Trophy: 2022–23
