= Conor Bradley =

Northern Irish footballer (born 2003)

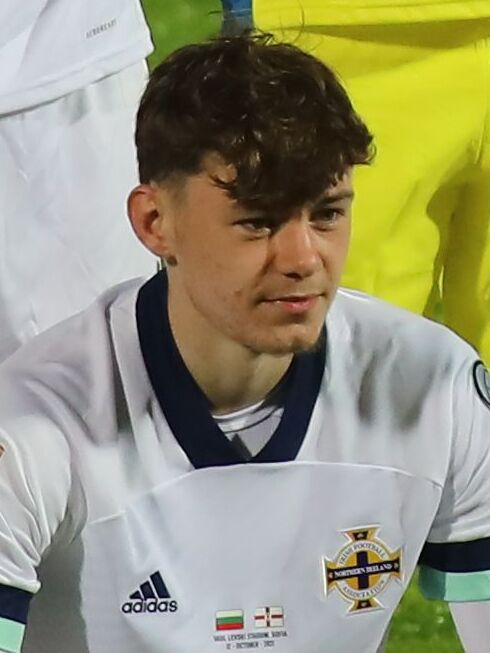
- Bradley with Northern Ireland in 2021

Personal information
- Full name: Conor Bradley
- Date of birth: 9 July 2003 (age 23)
- Place of birth: Castlederg, County Tyrone, Northern Ireland
- Height: 5 ft 11 in (1.80 m)
- Position: Right-back

Team information
- Current team: Liverpool
- Number: 12

Youth career
- 2012–2016: St Patrick's
- 2016–2019: Dungannon Swifts
- 2019–2021: Liverpool

Senior career*
Years	Team	Apps	(Gls)
2021–	Liverpool	45	(1)
2022–2023	→ Bolton Wanderers (loan)	41	(5)

International career^{‡}
2018	Northern Ireland U16	7	(0)
2019	Northern Ireland U17	5	(0)
2021–	Northern Ireland	30	(4)
- * Club domestic league appearances and goals as of 21:57, 8 January 2026 (UTC) ‡ National team caps and goals as of 21:56 17 November 2025 (UTC)

Conor Bradley (born 9 July 2003) is a Northern Irish professional footballer who plays as a right-back for Premier League club Liverpool and captains the Northern Ireland national team.

== Early and personal life ==
Conor Bradley was born on 9 July 2003 in Castlederg, County Tyrone, where he was raised. He played Gaelic football for his local club, Aghyaran St Davog's, with his ability noticeable from a young age. He attended the Christian Brothers Grammar School in Omagh, being fast tracked through the school to complete his GCSEs. His father, Joe Bradley, died at home in Killen, County Tyrone, in February 2024, following a period of ill health.

== Club career ==
=== Liverpool ===
==== Early career ====
Bradley began his youth career with hometown club St Patrick's at age nine and also began training at English club Liverpool's Northern Ireland development centre at the same age. He went on to play for Dungannon United Youth and Dungannon Swifts, before moving to England to join the youth academy of Liverpool full time in 2019 on a two-year scholarship program. However, after a year at the club, he signed his first professional contract with Liverpool, lasting three years until 2023.

Bradley made his first-team debut for Liverpool in a 2021–22 EFL Cup tie against Norwich City in September 2021, becoming the first Northern Irish player to feature in a competitive game for Liverpool since Sammy Smyth in 1954.

==== Loan to Bolton Wanderers ====
On 21 June 2022, Bradley signed for League One club Bolton Wanderers on a season-long loan. He made his debut on 30 July in a 1–1 draw away to Ipswich Town. He scored his first goal in the club's 5–1 EFL Cup victory over Salford City on 9 August. A week later, he scored his first league goal, the only one of the game in a 1–0 win over Morecambe On 2 April 2023, he started in the EFL Trophy final which Bolton won 4–0 against Plymouth Argyle. On 29 April, he started in a 2–0 win over Fleetwood Town that saw Bolton reach the 2023 League One play-offs. The same day, he was voted as Bolton Wanderers' Player of the Year for the 2022–23 season, while also receiving the Players' Player of the Year and Young Player of the Year awards, the latter of which he shared with James Trafford.

==== Return to Liverpool: 2023–2024 season ====
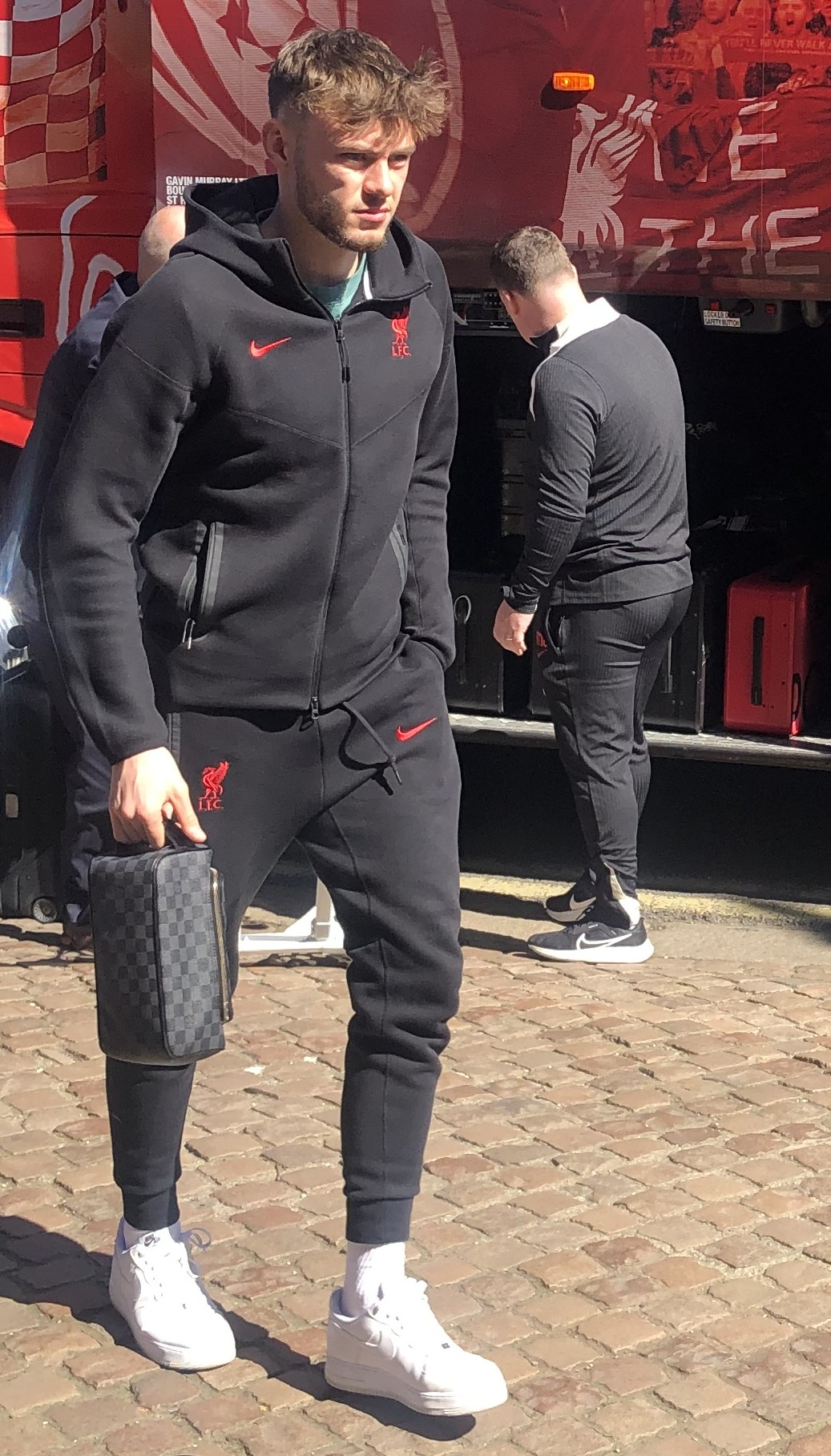
Bradley with Liverpool in 2025

On 21 January 2024, Bradley made his full Premier League debut in a 4–0 win over Bournemouth, starting the match and registering an assist for Diogo Jota's second goal. On 31 January, he scored his first goal for Liverpool in a 4–1 victory against Chelsea. He also registered two assists to his name, earning him the Man of the Match award for the second time in three days.

On 25 February 2024, Bradley started for Liverpool at right-back in the 2024 EFL Cup final against Chelsea at Wembley Stadium, before being substituted in the 72nd minute. Liverpool went on to win the match 1–0 after extra time, earning Bradley his first trophy with the club.

==== 2024–2025 season ====
Having established himself as a rotational player during the 2023–24 season, Bradley earned high praise for his strong start to life under new manager Arne Slot during the 2024–25 season campaign. In particular, his performance in Liverpool's 2–0 Champions League victory over Real Madrid on 27 November 2024, which featured a crunching first-half tackle on French forward Kylian Mbappé, was hailed as a breakout moment for the young right-back.

Liverpool won the 2024–25 Premier League, making Bradley the first Northern Irishman to win the league since Jonny Evans who won it with Manchester United in 2013. On 17 May 2025, it was announced that Bradley had signed a new long-term contract with Liverpool.

==== 2025–2026 season ====
Bradley entered the 2025–26 season with a new squad number changing from 84 to 12. On 8 January 2026, he sustained an knee injury during an 0–0 away draw against Arsenal which would sideline him for the rest of the season. Arsenal player Gabriel Martinelli received criticism after twice trying to push him from the pitch; he later apologised for his actions, saying he "didn't really understand".

== International career ==
Bradley played for the Northern Ireland under-16 national team in 2018, and captained the team to winning the Victory Shield. The following year, he appeared for the under-17 team, including in 2019 UEFA European Under-17 Championship qualifying.

In May 2021, Bradley was called up to the senior national team for friendly matches against Malta and Ukraine. He made his international debut on 30 May against Malta, coming on as a substitute in the 85th minute for Stuart Dallas in a 3–0 win for Northern Ireland.

On 26 March 2024, Bradley scored his first goal for his country in a 1–0 away win over Scotland in a friendly.

Bradley ended 2024 with 3 further international goals. He scored a brace against Andorra in Murcia on 11 June as well as Northern Ireland's second in a 2–2 draw against Luxembourg, helping his country to UEFA Nations League promotion on 18 November.

During the campaign, Bradley captained his country for the first time in a goalless draw behind closed doors against Belarus in Zalaegerszeg, Hungary.

== Career statistics ==
=== Club ===
As of match played 8 January 2026

Appearances and goals by club, season and competition
Club	Season	League			FA Cup		EFL Cup		Europe		Other		Total	
Club	Season	Division	Apps	Goals	Apps	Goals	Apps	Goals	Apps	Goals	Apps	Goals	Apps	Goals
Liverpool U21	2020–21	—			—		—		—		2 (Note: Appearances in EFL Trophy)	0	2	0
Liverpool	2021–22	Premier League	0	0	1	0	3	0	1 (Note: Appearance(s) in UEFA Champions League)	0	—		5	0
Liverpool	2023–24	Premier League	11	1	4	0	4	0	4 (Note: Appearances in UEFA Europa League)	0	—		23	1
Liverpool	2024–25	Premier League	19	0	1	0	4	0	5	0	—		29	0
Liverpool	2025–26	Premier League	15	0	0	0	1	0	5	0	0	0	21	0
Liverpool	Total		45	1	6	0	12	0	15	0	0	0	78	1
Bolton Wanderers (loan)	2022–23	League One	41	5	1	0	2	1	—		9 (Note: Seven appearances and one goal in EFL Trophy, two appearances in League One play-offs)	1	53	7
Career total			86	6	7	0	14	1	15	0	11	1	133	8

=== International ===
As of match played 17 November 2025

Appearances and goals by national team and year
National team	Year	Apps	Goals
Northern Ireland	2021	5	0
Northern Ireland	2022	5	0
Northern Ireland	2023	3	0
Northern Ireland	2024	10	4
Northern Ireland	2025	7	0
Total		30	4

As of match played 17 November 2025
Scores and results list Northern Ireland's goal tally first, score column indicates score after each Bradley goal

List of international goals scored by Conor Bradley
No.	Date	Venue	Cap	Opponent	Score	Result	Competition	Ref.
1	26 March 2024	Hampden Park, Glasgow, Scotland	15	Scotland	1–0	1–0	Friendly	
2	11 June 2024	Estadio Nueva Condomina, Murcia, Spain	17	Andorra	1–0	2–0	Friendly	
3	11 June 2024	Estadio Nueva Condomina, Murcia, Spain	17	Andorra	2–0	2–0	Friendly	
4	18 November 2024	Stade de Luxembourg, Luxembourg City, Luxembourg	23	Luxembourg	2–0	2–2	2024–25 UEFA Nations League C	

== Honours ==
Bolton Wanderers

- EFL Trophy: 2022–23

Liverpool

- Premier League: 2024–25
- FA Cup: 2021–22
- EFL Cup: 2021–22, 2023–24; runner-up: 2024–25

Individual

- PFA Premier League Fans' Player of the Month: January 2024
- Bolton Wanderers Player of the Year: 2022–23
- Bolton Wanderers Players' Player of the Year: 2022–23
- Bolton Wanderers Young Player of the Year: 2022–23 (Shared)
- Northern Ireland Senior Men's Player of the Year: 2024
