= Lamine Toure =

English footballer

Personal information
- Full name: Lamine Cheriff Toure
- Date of birth: 24 December 2003 (age 22)
- Place of birth: England
- Position: Defender

Team information
- Current team: Bolton Wanderers
- Number: 43

Youth career
- 2015–2022: Bolton Wanderers

Senior career*
Years	Team	Apps	(Gls)
2022– 2024	Bolton Wanderers	0	(0)
2022–2023	→ Lancaster City (loan)	3	(0)
2023–2024	→ Bamber Bridge (loan)	9	(0)
- * Club domestic league appearances and goals as of 12:00, 23 April 2024 (UTC)

Lamine Cheriff Toure (born 24 December 2003) is an English footballer of Scottish, Senegalese, Malian and Nigerian descent who last played as a defender for League One side Bolton Wanderers.

== Career ==
Toure came through the Bolton Wanderers Reserves Academy after joining at U12 level. On 13 June 2022, he was one of the five Academy graduates who signed their first professional contracts with Bolton.

Toure made his Bolton debut on 10 August 2022 in a 5–1 victory against Salford City in the EFL Cup, coming on in the 88th minute as a substitute for Gethin Jones. On 25 November 2022, he moved on loan to Lancaster City until 3 January 2023. On 25 May 2023, he signed a new one-year deal with the option for an extra year. On 22 May 2024, the club confirmed that he would be leaving at the end of his contract on 30 June.

== Career statistics ==
As of match played 16 March 2024

Appearances and goals by club, season and competition
Club	Season	League			FA Cup		League Cup		Other		Total	
Club	Season	Division	Apps	Goals	Apps	Goals	Apps	Goals	Apps	Goals	Apps	Goals
Bolton Wanderers	2022–23	League One	0	0	0	0	1	0	0	0	1	0
Bolton Wanderers	2023–24	League One	0	0	0	0	0	0	0	0	0	0
Bolton Wanderers	Total		0	0	0	0	1	0	0	0	1	0
Lancaster City (loan)	2022–23	Northern Premier League	3	0	—		—		—		3	0
Bamber Bridge (loan)	2023–24	Northern Premier League	9	0	—		—		—		9	0
Career total			12	0	0	0	1	0	0	0	13	0
