= James Trafford =

English footballer (born 2002)

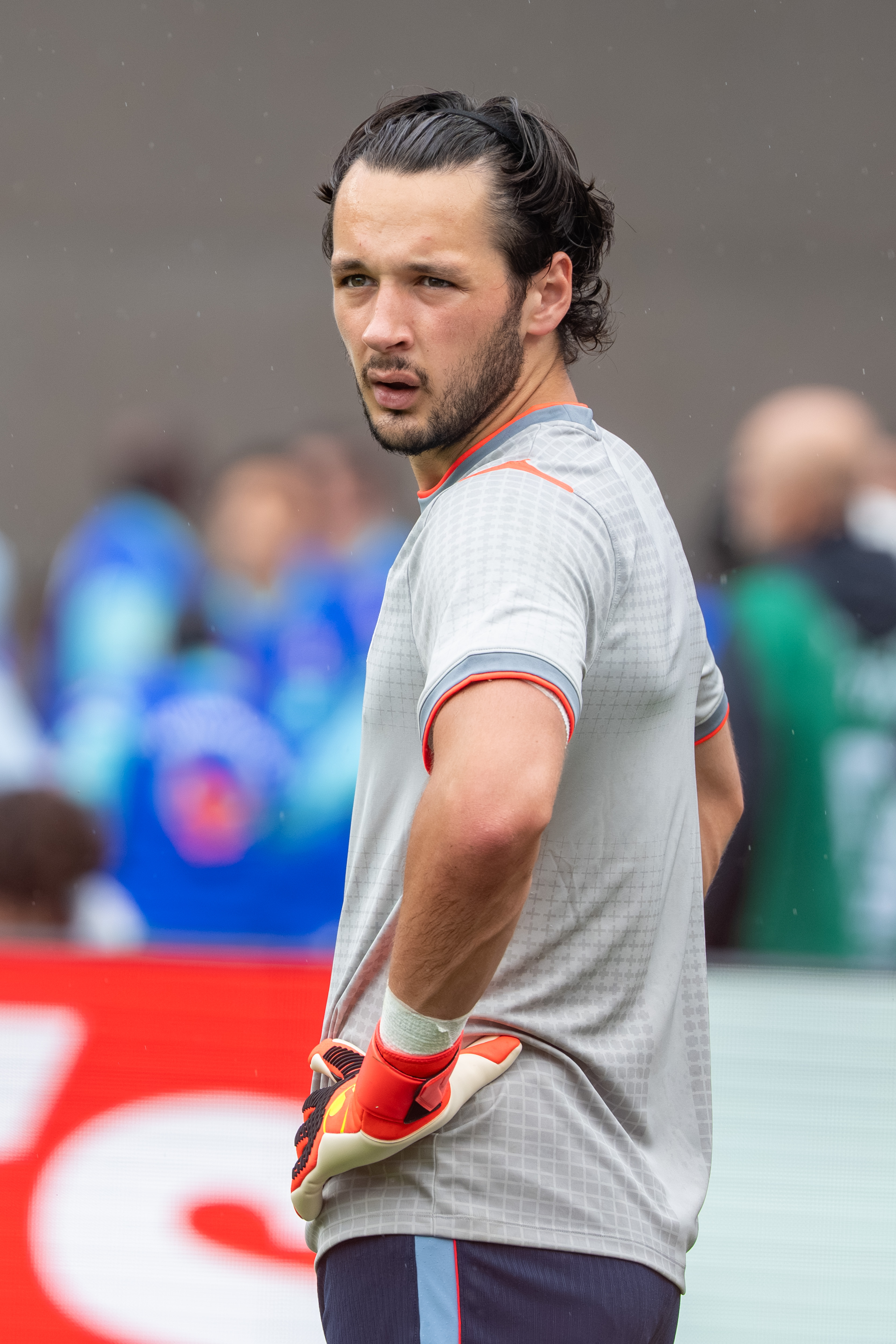
- Trafford with England in 2026

Personal information
- Full name: James Harrington Trafford
- Date of birth: 10 October 2002 (age 24)
- Place of birth: Cockermouth, England
- Height: 6 ft 6 in (1.97 m)
- Position: Goalkeeper

Team information
- Current team: Leeds United
- Number: 1

Youth career
- Cockermouth
- Carlisle United
- 2015–2021: Manchester City

Senior career*
Years	Team	Apps	(Gls)
2021–2023	Manchester City	0	(0)
2021–2022	→ Accrington Stanley (loan)	11	(0)
2022	→ Bolton Wanderers (loan)	22	(0)
2022–2023	→ Bolton Wanderers (loan)	45	(0)
2023–2025	Burnley	73	(0)
2025–2026	Manchester City	4	(0)
2026–	Leeds United	11	(0)

International career^{‡}
2018–2019	England U17	7	(0)
2019	England U18	2	(0)
2019	England U19	1	(0)
2021–2022	England U20	5	(0)
2022–2024	England U21	19	(0)
2026–	England	5	(0)
Medal record
Men's football
Representing England
FIFA World Cup
Third place	2026 Canada–Mexico–US
UEFA European Under-21 Championship
Winner	2023 Georgia-Romania
- * Club domestic league appearances and goals as of 08:36, 22 November 2026 (UTC) ‡ National team caps and goals as of 21:40, 15 November 2026 (UTC)

James Harrington Trafford (born 10 October 2002) is an English professional footballer who plays as a goalkeeper for Premier League club Leeds United and the England national team.

== Early life ==
Trafford was born in Cockermouth, Cumbria, and grew up in the nearby village of Greysouthen in a farming family. He was a Chelsea fan. He attended Cockermouth School and St Bede's College. He learned to drive on a tractor and in his early career he would return to help out on the family farm in the close season.

== Club career ==
=== Manchester City ===
Trafford began his career with Cockermouth and Carlisle United, signing with Manchester City in August 2015 at the age of 12. At Carlisle he began as a midfielder but volunteered to become a goalkeeper at age nine. He was part of the Manchester City Under-18s team that won the 2019–20 Professional U18 Development League and the Under-23s team that won the 2020–21 Professional U23 Development League.

He moved on loan to Accrington Stanley in July 2021. This loan was later described as "challenging" due to injuries and losing his first-team place.

==== Bolton Wanderers ====
Trafford signed on loan for Bolton Wanderers on 13 January 2022, until the end of the 2021–22 season. He kept four clean sheets in his first four games, the first time a goalkeeper had done so in Bolton's entire history.

On 15 June 2022, Trafford rejoined Bolton on loan for a further season. In July 2022, he signed a new five-year contract with Manchester City. By October he was noted for his clean sheets, and Trafford broke Bolton's record for consecutive home clean sheets on 4 February, with the 1–0 win over Cheltenham Town being his eighth in a row. He was able to extend the record to nine, though was unable to have it reach double figures as on 25 February he conceded against Port Vale in a 2–1 win, the first time since 2 December. On 2 April, he started in the 2023 EFL Trophy final and kept a clean sheet in 4–0 win against Plymouth Argyle. Trafford's clean sheet in a 1–0 win against Shrewbury Town on 22 April was his 25th of the season, which broke the record for the most clean sheets by a Bolton goalkeeper in one season. He finished the season with a total of 26 clean sheets. He helped Bolton qualify for the play-offs, though they were defeated by Barnsley in the semi-finals. He was voted as Bolton's Young Player of the Year for the 2022–23 season, together with Conor Bradley. His performances during the season saw him named in the PFA Team of the Year for League One. He said his time at Bolton turned him from a "long, skinny boy" into a "long, skinny man".

Since leaving Bolton, Trafford has consistently expressed his love for the club, going as far as to say "I am a Bolton fan, I love Bolton. Everyone in the club, I loved them."

=== Burnley ===
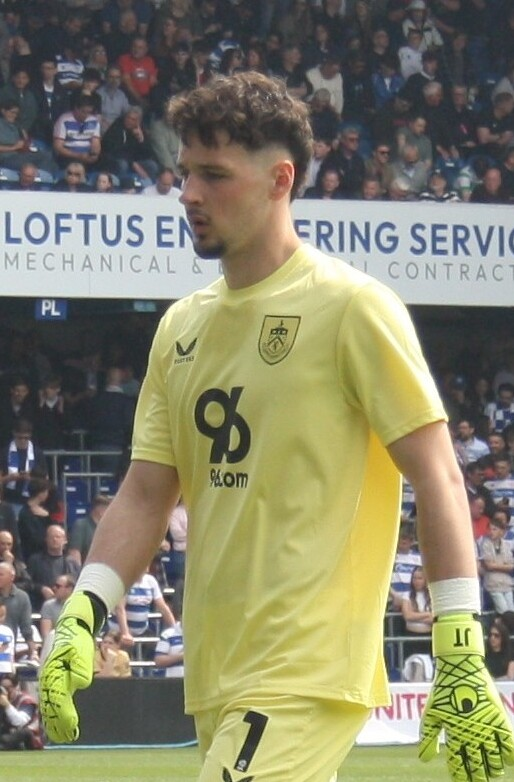
Trafford with Burnley in 2025

On 3 July 2023, it was announced that a £15 million transfer fee had been agreed between Manchester City and Burnley for Trafford. With add-ons, the deal could reach a total of £19 million — which if met would break Burnley's transfer record. On 20 July 2023, Trafford's move to Burnley was officially completed. Due to their sell-on clause, Carlisle United got 15% of the fee for around £2.25m. He became the third most expensive British goalkeeper in history.

He made his Burnley and Premier League debut on 11 August 2023, in a 3–0 home defeat to his former club, Manchester City. He earned high praise after a Man of the Match performance in a 1–1 draw against Brighton & Hove Albion on 9 December, in which he made 10 saves.

In January 2025, he saved two penalties in a league match against Sunderland, being praised by manager Scott Parker as a "special" player. Having not conceded a goal across any of their six matches in the month, he was named EFL Championship Player of the Month. By February 2025, Trafford had gone 1,000 minutes without conceding a goal. In March 2025, this streak came to an end in Burnley's EFL Championship match against Cardiff City, with Yousef Salech scoring in the 42nd minute. During this run, Trafford kept 12 clean sheets in a row, breaking the record for the most consecutive clean sheets in Championship history (the prior record was 10). After 33 games, Trafford and Burnley had conceded only nine goals, the fewest in the history of English Football at that point of the season. Trafford finished the season with 29 clean sheets, which equalled the record for a goalkeeper in a single season in English football. During the 2024–25 season, Burnley conceded only 16 goals in 46 games, the fewest in the history of the Football League, beating the previous record of 20, although this was one more than Chelsea's 15 conceded in 38 games in the 2004–05 Premier League.

=== Return to Manchester City ===
On 29 July 2025, Manchester City announced the return of Trafford on a five-year deal, after activating their buy-back clause and matching Newcastle United's £31 million bid. Trafford's official fee was £31 million (being the record paid for a British goalkeeper), although City received £4 million back due to their sell-on clause, and so only paid £27 million. On 16 August, he made his debut for City in their first Premier League game of the season, keeping a clean sheet in a 4–0 away win against Wolverhampton Wanderers. In his home debut for City on 23 August, he made an error that led to Tottenham Hotspur's second goal in a 2–0 defeat. After the game, Guardiola said he still backed Trafford. Trafford was presented with the August Save of the Month award for saving a close-range shot by Jan Paul van Hecke as City lost 2–1 to Brighton & Hove Albion on 31 August.

After playing in the club's first few matches, he was dropped in favour of transfer deadline day signing Gianluigi Donnarumma. Thereafter Trafford appeared only in Cup games, with former Man City goalkeeper Nicky Weaver saying he "felt sorry" for Trafford. On 22 March 2026, Trafford started in the EFL Cup final, securing a 2–0 victory over Arsenal and becoming the second youngest goalkeeper to achieve this feat, surpassed only by Chris Woods in 1978. On 16 May, he started the FA Cup final, with Man City beating Chelsea 1–0 — meaning Trafford and City won both domestic cups that season.

=== Leeds United ===
In July 2026, Trafford was linked with a reported £40 million transfer to Leeds United, after the club had lost two goalkeepers in the transfer window. BBC Sport suggested such a move might help Trafford's England chances. The transfer was completed on 6 August 2026, for £45 million. This broke his own existing record as the most expensive ever British goalkeeper, and also broke Leeds' transfer record. He made his debut for the club in a 1–0 away victory against Nottingham Forest on 22 August.

== International career ==
Trafford played his first international match of his career for England U17 on 24 March 2018 against Croatia U17 in which he saved a penalty and kept a clean sheet in a 0–0 draw despite England being down to ten men. He made a further six appearances for the U17 including one appearance at the 2019 UEFA European Under-17 Championship, then played twice for England U18, and once for England U19.

On 6 September 2021, Trafford made his debut for the England U20s during a 6–1 victory over Romania U20s at St. George's Park.

On 25 May 2022, Trafford received his first call up to the England U21 squad ahead of the final round of 2023 UEFA European Under-21 Championship qualification matches. Trafford made his debut in the 5–0 win away to Kosovo.

On 14 June 2023, Trafford was included in the England squad for the 2023 UEFA European Under-21 Championship. He did not concede a goal during the tournament in six matches, the first time a goalkeeper had done this in the tournament's history, and saved a stoppage-time penalty and its rebound in the final against Spain as England won the game 1–0. His mentality was praised by England under-21 manager Lee Carsley. It was later reported that Trafford had told friends that he would save a penalty that game.

Following an injury to Sam Johnstone in March 2024, Trafford received his first call up to the senior squad for a friendly against Belgium. He was selected to England's provisional 33-member squad for Euro 2024, but was dropped from the final 26-man squad on 6 June. In October 2025, Manchester City manager Pep Guardiola said that Trafford would become an England goalkeeper in due course.

On 27 March 2026, Trafford made his full England international debut in a friendly against Uruguay at Wembley. He conceded a stoppage time penalty, with the match ending in a 1–1 draw.

On 22 May 2026, Trafford was selected in England's 26-man squad for the 2026 FIFA World Cup. He remained an unused substitute, serving as backup to first-choice goalkeeper Jordan Pickford, as England went on to finish the tournament in third place. In September 2026 he was said by the BBC to be challenging Pickford as England's first-choice goalkeeper.

On 15 November 2026, following a strong performance against reigning world champions Spain, and ending Spain's world record 43 match unbeaten run, Trafford was praised by the media and stated by some journalists to have established himself as England's number 1 goalkeeper.

== Style of play ==
Trafford spent his early career as an outfield player. At Carlisle he began as a midfielder, but volunteered to become a goalkeeper at age nine. He has been praised for his reflexes and distribution. He is noted for his ability to keep clean sheets, breaking multiple records with Bolton Wanderers, Burnley, and winning the 2023 UEFA European Under-21 Championship without conceding a goal.

== Personal life ==
In 2025, two years after leaving Bolton Wanderers, Trafford revealed he loved his time at the club so much that it had caused him to become a Bolton fan. He collects Pokémon Cards.

== Career statistics ==
=== Club ===
As of match played 21 November 2026

Appearances and goals by club, season and competition
Club	Season	League			FA Cup		EFL Cup		Europe		Other		Total	
Club	Season	Division	Apps	Goals	Apps	Goals	Apps	Goals	Apps	Goals	Apps	Goals	Apps	Goals
Manchester City U23	2020–21	—			—		—		—		2 (Note: Appearances in EFL Trophy)	0	2	0
Manchester City	2021–22	Premier League	0	0	0	0	0	0	0	0	0	0	0	0
Manchester City	2022–23	Premier League	0	0	0	0	0	0	0	0	0	0	0	0
Manchester City	Total		0	0	0	0	0	0	0	0	0	0	0	0
Accrington Stanley (loan)	2021–22	League One	11	0	0	0	0	0	—		0	0	11	0
Bolton Wanderers (loan)	2021–22	League One	22	0	0	0	0	0	—		0	0	22	0
Bolton Wanderers (loan)	2022–23	League One	45	0	1	0	0	0	—		6 (Note: Four appearances in EFL Trophy, two appearances in League One play-offs)	0	52	0
Burnley	2023–24	Premier League	28	0	0	0	0	0	—		—		28	0
Burnley	2024–25	Championship	45	0	0	0	0	0	—		—		45	0
Burnley	Total		73	0	0	0	0	0	0	0	0	0	73	0
Manchester City	2025–26	Premier League	4	0	6	0	6	0	1 (Note: Appearance in UEFA Champions League)	0	—		17	0
Leeds United	2026–27	Premier League	11	0	0	0	1	0	—		—		12	0
Career total			166	0	7	0	7	0	1	0	8	0	189	0

=== International ===
As of match played 15 November 2026

Appearances and goals by national team and year
National team	Year	Apps	Goals
England	2026	5	0
Total		5	0

== Honours ==
Manchester City Under-18s

- Professional U18 Development League: 2019–20

Manchester City Under-23s

- Professional U23 Development League: 2020–21

Bolton Wanderers

- EFL Trophy: 2022–23

Burnley

- EFL Championship runner-up: 2024–25

Manchester City

- FA Cup: 2025–26
- EFL Cup: 2025–26

England U21

- UEFA European Under-21 Championship: 2023

England

- FIFA World Cup third place: 2026

Individual

- Bolton Wanderers Young Player of the Year: 2022–23 (shared)
- UEFA European Under-21 Championship Team of the Tournament: 2023
- PFA Team of the Year: 2022–23 League One, 2024–25 Championship
- EFL Championship Player of the Month: January 2025
- EFL Championship Team of the Season: 2024–25
- EFL Championship Golden Glove: 2024–25
- PFA Championship Player of the Year: 2024–25
