= Gethin Jones (soccer, born 1995) =

Australian soccer player (born 1995)

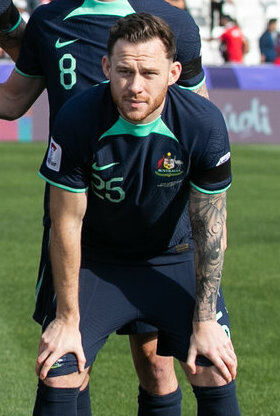
- Jones with Australia at the 2023 AFC Asian Cup

Personal information
- Full name: Gethin Wynne Jones
- Date of birth: 13 October 1995 (age 31)
- Place of birth: Perth, Australia
- Height: 5 ft 10 in (1.78 m)
- Positions: Right back; centre-back

Team information
- Current team: Milton Keynes Dons
- Number: 2

Youth career
- 2007–2008: Wrexham
- 2008–2014: Everton

Senior career*
Years	Team	Apps	(Gls)
2014–2018	Everton	0	(0)
2015	→ Plymouth Argyle (loan)	6	(0)
2017	→ Barnsley (loan)	17	(0)
2018–2019	Fleetwood Town	13	(0)
2019	→ Mansfield Town (loan)	15	(0)
2019–2020	Carlisle United	30	(0)
2020–2025	Bolton Wanderers	163	(6)
2025–	Milton Keynes Dons	35	(1)

International career^{‡}
- Wales U16
2011	Wales U17	5	(1)
2012–2014	Wales U19	7	(0)
2014–2016	Wales U21	9	(0)
2024–	Australia	6	(0)
- * Club domestic league appearances and goals as of 2 May 2026 (UTC) ‡ National team caps and goals as of 23:44, 12 June 2024 (UTC)

Gethin Wynne Jones (born 13 October 1995) is an Australian professional soccer player who plays as a right back or centre-back for EFL League One club Milton Keynes Dons. A former youth international for Wales, he plays for the Australia national team.

== Club career ==
=== Everton ===
Jones was born in Perth, Australia, and joined Everton's academy at the age of 12, signing from Wrexham's academy. His position switched from central midfield to right-back. While progressing through the ranks, Jones won Goal of the Season at the end of the 2011–12 season. He helped Everton win the Under-18 Premier League and in May 2014, then signed a one-year professional contract.

He made his professional debut for the club on 11 December 2014, replacing Tyias Browning in the final minute of a UEFA Europa League match against FC Krasnodar. Everton, having already advanced from the group, lost the match 1–0 at Goodison Park. With one appearance made in the 2014–15 season, Jones signed a two-year contract with the club, keeping him until 2017.

On 25 March 2015, Jones was loaned to League Two team Plymouth Argyle for the remainder of the season. He made his debut nine days later, playing the full 90 minutes in a 1–1 draw with league leaders Burton Albion at Home Park. He played a total of six league games as Plymouth reached the play-offs, featuring in the first leg of their eventual semi-final defeat to Wycombe Wanderers.

Jones joined Championship side Barnsley on 18 January 2017, until the end of the 2016–17 season. Jones made his Barnsley debut three days later, where he made his first start and played the whole game, in a 3–2 win over Leeds United. Jones made eighteen appearances that season: seventeen in the League for Barnsley and one EFL Trophy appearance for Everton U23s against Blackpool.

Jones featured only once more in Everton colours in 2017–18, again in the EFL Trophy, in a defeat to Notts County.

=== Fleetwood Town ===
Jones signed a "long-term" deal at EFL League One side Fleetwood Town on 5 January 2018, ending a decade-long association with Everton. He was assigned squad number 19. Jones made his Cod Army début as an 84th-minute substitute on 13 January, replacing Lewie Coyle in a 2–1 win over Southend United, before making his first Town start three days later in the FA Cup third round replay at Leicester City. His first league start for Fleetwood came on 20 January in a 2–1 defeat against fellow Lancashire club Blackburn Rovers.

He left Fleetwood Town by mutual consent on 19 August 2019.

=== Carlisle United ===
Jones signed a short-term deal at EFL League Two side Carlisle United on 13 September 2019. His contract was extended until the end of the season on 10 January 2020. Jones left Carlisle United following the 2019–20 season after he declined a contract extension with the club.

=== Bolton Wanderers ===
On 4 August 2020, Jones signed for Bolton Wanderers on a one-year contract with the option of another year's extension. His debut came on 5 September in Bolton's first match of the season, a 2–1 home defeat against Bradford in the first round of the EFL Cup. On 5 December 2020 he scored the first goal of his professional career when he scored Bolton's first goal in a 6–3 defeat against Port Vale. On 8 May 2021, it was revealed Bolton had activated the extension in his contract. On 25 May, Jones revealed he had signed a new two-year contract and on 5 November, he signed a one-year contract extension extending it to 2024. On 2 April, he started in the 2023 EFL Trophy Final. He scored the fourth goal, with the Final against Plymouth Argyle eventually ending with a 4–0 Bolton win. He dedicated the goal to his mother, who had died a year earlier. On 28 June 2023, he signed a new deal running up to 2025. On 7 May 2025, the club confirmed that Jones would leave at the end of his contract after five years with them.

=== Milton Keynes Dons ===
On 12 June 2025, Jones agreed to join League Two side Milton Keynes Dons upon the expiry of his contract with Bolton Wanderers. He made his debut for the club on 2 August 2025, the opening day of the 2025–26 season, in a 0-0 home draw with Oldham Athletic.

On 10 March 2026, Jones scored his first goal for the club in a 1-5 away win over Gillingham. At the conclusion of his first season, he achieved the second promotion of his career with the club finishing in second place, having made 35 appearances and scoring a single goal during the campaign.

== International career ==
Australia contacted Everton two or three months back asking for me to play for their U23s but I didn't want to make any decisions then. I feel more Welsh than Australian. I've been Wales captain from the U16s to the U21s so if the first team called I'd definitely go for that. But it depends now. If Australia came in before Wales you never know, it's something I'd have to seriously think about.

— Jones on dual eligibility, 2017.

Jones was eligible to play for Australia and Wales but in the end opted for the Socceroos.

Jones was included in the Wales U16 side in the 2010 Victory Shield, playing against the English, Scottish, and Northern Irish equivalents. Having captained the side at U16 level, Jones also skippered Wales U17.

Jones was called up by Wales U19 for the first time, following his stint at U16 and U17. Jones made his Wales U19 debut on 10 September 2012, where he captained the side and played 90 minutes, in a 3–1 loss against Germany U19.

Two years later, Jones was called up by Wales U21 for the first time and made his Wales U21 debut on 5 September 2014, playing the whole game, in a 2–2 draw against Finland U21. Like his time at Wales U16, Wales U17 and Wales U19, Jones had captained Wales U21 as well.

Having trained with the full Welsh side, reports in November 2016 suggested Jones had been contacted by Football Federation Australia with a view to Jones representing Australia. In a 2017 interview, Jones confirmed that this had occurred and the offer was to play for the Australia U23 side.

In December 2020, he was asked in the Bolton Wanderers official match day programme whether he considered himself Welsh or Australian to which he replied:

"I'd have to say Wales, obviously I was born in Australia but I've lived in Wales pretty much my whole life and speak the Welsh language. I'm 100% Welsh."

In December 2023, Jones received his maiden senior international call-up when was named in the Australian squad for the 2023 AFC Asian Cup to be held in January–February 2024. His debut came on 6 January in which he started a 2–0 pre tournament friendly win against Bahrain.

== Personal life ==
A Welsh Australian, Jones is bilingual in English and Welsh.

In 2021, Jones's mother was diagnosed with motor neurone disease. On 23 September, Bolton Wanderers announced the first team would play a friendly against a team consisting of legendary Bolton players on 13 November to help raise money for his mother's recovery. A quarter of the money raised would also go to former Bolton player Stephen Darby's charity Darby Rimmer MND Foundation, as he had also suffered from Motor Neurone Disease which had forced him to retire. His mother died on 2 March 2022. A year later, he revealed that her death nearly caused him to retire but that the support he received from the fans and staff at Bolton helped him through it.

== Career statistics ==
=== Club ===
As of 8 August 2026

Appearances and goals by club, season and competition
Club	Season	League			FA Cup		League Cup		Other		Total	
Club	Season	Division	Apps	Goals	Apps	Goals	Apps	Goals	Apps	Goals	Apps	Goals
Everton	2014–15	Premier League	0	0	0	0	0	0	1 (Note: Appearance in UEFA Europa League)	0	1	0
Everton	2015–16	Premier League	0	0	0	0	0	0	0	0	0	0
Everton	2016–17	Premier League	0	0	0	0	0	0	0	0	0	0
Everton	Total		0	0	0	0	0	0	1	0	1	0
Plymouth Argyle (loan)	2014–15	League Two	6	0	0	0	0	0	1 (Note: Appearance(s) in League Two play-offs)	0	7	0
Barnsley (loan)	2016–17	Championship	17	0	0	0	0	0	0	0	17	0
Everton U21	2016–17	—			—		—		1 (Note: Appearance(s) in EFL Trophy)	0	1	0
Everton U21	2017–18	—			—		—		1	0	1	0
Fleetwood Town	2017–18	League One	10	0	1	0	0	0	0	0	11	0
Fleetwood Town	2018–19	League One	3	0	0	0	2	0	3	0	8	0
Fleetwood Town	Total		13	0	1	0	2	0	3	0	19	0
Mansfield Town (loan)	2018–19	League Two	15	0	0	0	0	0	2	0	17	0
Carlisle United	2019–20	League Two	30	0	5	0	0	0	2	0	37	0
Bolton Wanderers	2020–21	League Two	38	3	0	0	1	0	1	0	40	3
Bolton Wanderers	2021–22	League One	29	0	0	0	2	0	0	0	31	0
Bolton Wanderers	2022–23	League One	39	2	1	0	1	0	5	1	46	3
Bolton Wanderers	2023–24	League One	34	1	2	0	2	0	6 (Note: Three appearances in EFL Trophy, three appearance in League One play-offs)	1	44	2
Bolton Wanderers	2024–25	League One	23	0	0	0	0	0	4	0	27	0
Bolton Wanderers	Total		173	6	3	0	6	0	16	2	188	8
Milton Keynes Dons	2025–26	League Two	35	1	2	0	0	0	0	0	37	1
Milton Keynes Dons	2026–27	League One	0	0	0	0	1	0	0	0	1	0
Milton Keynes Dons	Total		35	1	2	0	1	0	0	0	38	1
Career total			279	7	11	0	9	0	27	2	326	9

=== International ===
As of match played 11 June 2024

Appearances and goals by national team and year
National team	Year	Apps	Goals
Australia	2024	6	0
Total		6	0

== Honours ==
Bolton Wanderers

- EFL League Two third-place promotion: 2020–21
- EFL Trophy: 2022–23

Milton Keynes Dons

- EFL League Two runner-up: 2025–26
