= MJ Williams =

Welsh footballer (born 1995)

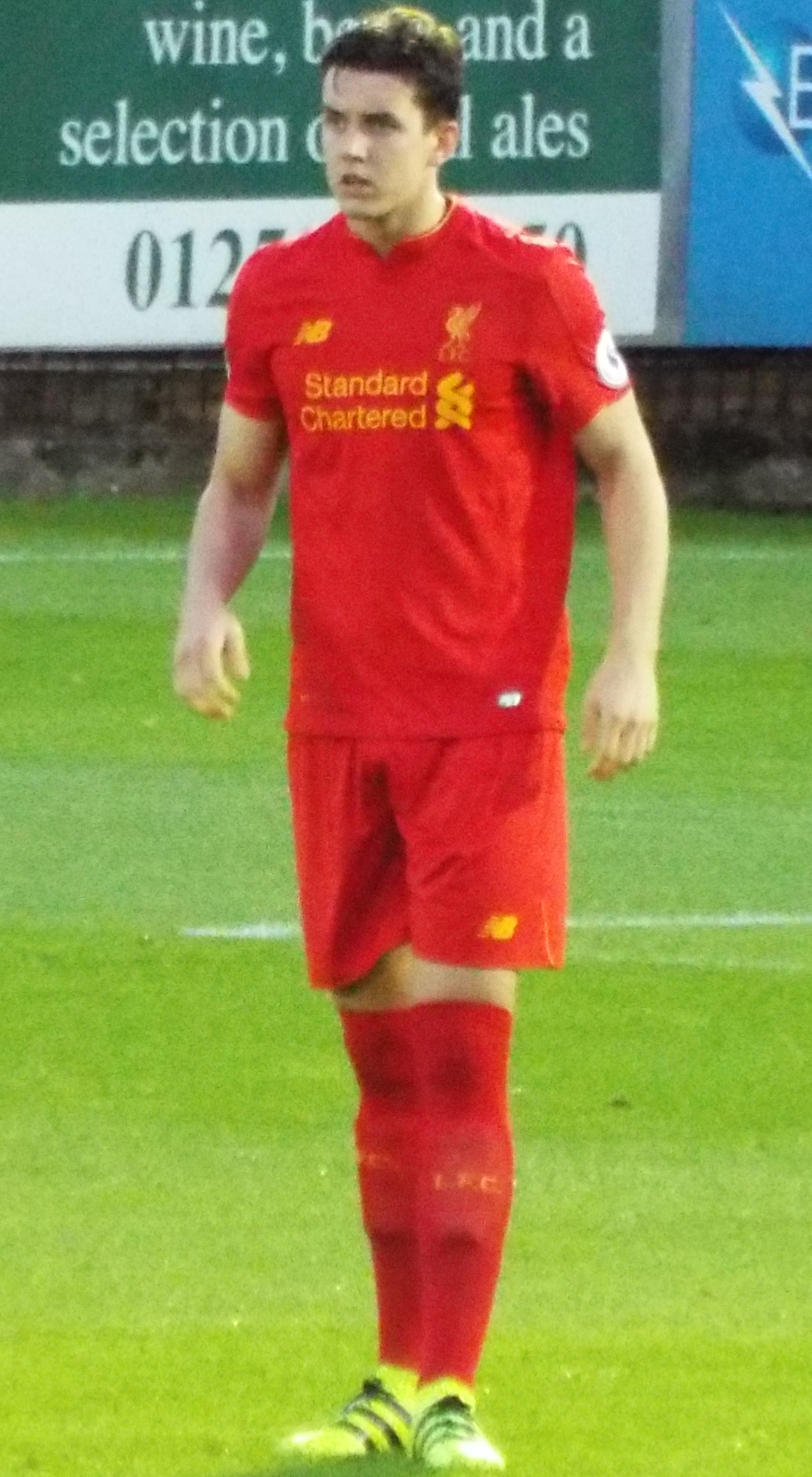
- Williams playing for Liverpool in 2016

Personal information
- Full name: Michael Jordan Williams
- Date of birth: 6 November 1995 (age 30)
- Place of birth: Bangor, Wales
- Height: 6 ft 2 in (1.87 m)
- Positions: Midfielder; defender

Team information
- Current team: Barrow
- Number: 4

Youth career
- Wrexham
- 2009–2014: Liverpool

Senior career*
Years	Team	Apps	(Gls)
2014–2018	Liverpool	0	(0)
2015	→ Notts County (loan)	8	(0)
2015–2016	→ Swindon Town (loan)	9	(0)
2017	→ Rochdale (loan)	12	(0)
2018–2020	Rochdale	56	(0)
2020–2021	Blackpool	10	(0)
2021–2023	Bolton Wanderers	89	(1)
2023–2025	Milton Keynes Dons	50	(2)
2025–	Barrow	43	(0)

International career^{‡}
- Wales U17
2014	Wales U21	1	(0)
- * Club domestic league appearances and goals as of 19:55, 23 January 2025 (UTC) ‡ National team caps and goals as of 08:50, 3 April 2021 (UTC)

Michael Jordan Williams (born 6 November 1995) is a Welsh professional footballer who plays for National League club Barrow. He can play either central midfield or centre-back.

== Club career ==
=== Liverpool ===
Williams joined Liverpool academy at U14 level, having previously been playing for Wrexham.

On 23 September 2014, he made his first-team debut in a League Cup clash against Middlesbrough, coming on as a substitute in 79th minute for Jordan Rossiter. Williams scored in the penalty shootout. He was an unused substitute in the game against AFC Wimbledon in the third round of the FA Cup, and against Blackburn Rovers in a quarter-final of the same tournament, as well as Premier League games against Burnley and Manchester City and a UEFA Europa League clash against Turkish side Beşiktaş J.K. On 22 January 2015, he signed his first professional contract, signing a 2 1/2-year deal with Liverpool.

In 2015 Williams picked up an injury so bad he was nearly forced to retire, however after being the first Welsh footballer to undergo a cartilage transplant he was able to recover and continue his career.

In the 2016–17 season, Williams returned from his injury and was featured for the Liverpool U23 side. He did appear as an unused substitute in a FA Cup fourth round replay against Plymouth Argyle, which saw Liverpool win 1–0. In January transfer window of 2017, Williams was expected to leave the club on a permanent basis, with Charlton Athletic and MK Dons were among interested. Although the move never happened, Williams stayed at the club for the rest of the season; eventually, signing a contract extension.

He was released by Liverpool at the end of the 2017–18 season.

==== Loan spells ====
On 26 March 2015, Williams was loaned out to Notts County. He made his Notts County debut, where he started the whole game, in a 2–2 draw against Scunthorpe United on 28 March 2015. He went on to make eight appearances for the side, as Notts County were relegated to League Two next season. He returned to his parent club at the end of the 2014–15 season.

On 10 July 2015, he joined Swindon Town on a season-long loan. Williams made his Swindon Town debut in the opening game of the season, where he set up a goal for Nathan Byrne, who went on to score a hat–trick, in a 4–1 win over Bradford City. He started out in the midfield position before moving to the defence position. However, he suffered a knee injury that saw him sidelined for most of the season. Although he returned to training in early–2016, Manager Martin Ling hinted about terminating his loan with Swindon Town last month, though he resigned as Manager that month. After cutting his loan spell with the club in February 2016 to allow Williams to heal from his knee injury, he went on to make ten appearances for Swindon Town.

On 31 August 2017, Williams was loaned to Rochdale until 1 January 2018. He made his Rochdale debut, where he started the whole game and played with teammate with the same name, in a 0–0 draw against Southend United on 2 September 2017. In the EFL Trophy Group Stage against Bury, Williams set up a goal for Ian Henderson to score the fourth goal, in a 4–0 win on 19 September 2017. He went on to make 14 appearances for Rochdale before suffering an injury that ended his loan spell at the club.

=== Rochdale ===
On 14 June 2018, he joined Rochdale on a permanent deal, signing a two-year contract.

Williams' first game after signing for the club on a permanent basis came in the opening game of the season against Burton Albion, where he started the whole game, in a 2–1 win for Rochdale. A 4–0 loss against Barnsley on 21 August 2018 included three players by the name of Jordan Williams, with two of them at Rochdale and one at Barnsley.

=== Blackpool ===
Williams joined Blackpool on 24 August 2020, signing a one-year contract with the option for a further year.

=== Bolton Wanderers ===
On 1 February 2021, Williams joined League Two side Bolton Wanderers on an 18-month contract. His debut came on 9 February in a 1–1 draw against Morecambe. Bolton finished the season in third, winning promotion to League One and Williams revealed there was a clause in his contract which would extend it by another year if he made a certain number of appearances in League One during the 2021–2022 season and 5 November his contract was extended to 2023.

On 9 April 2022, he scored the first league goal of his career when finding the net for Bolton in the 90th minute of a 1–1 draw with Sheffield Wednesday at the University of Bolton Stadium. The only other goal of his career had come in the FA Cup for Rochdale away at Newcastle United in January 2020.

On 2 April, he came on as a substitute in the 2023 EFL Trophy Final against Plymouth Argyle. Bolton went on to win 4–0. At the end of the season, he had played enough matches to see his contract extended for another year.

=== Milton Keynes Dons ===
On 12 July 2023, Williams joined League Two club Milton Keynes Dons for an undisclosed fee. He made his debut for the club in the opening game of the 2023–24 season on 5 August 2023, in a 5–3 away win over Wrexham.

=== Barrow ===
On 23 January 2025, Williams joined League Two side Barrow for an undisclosed fee on a two-and-a-half year deal.

== International career ==
Having previously featured for the Wales U17 side, Williams made his Wales under-21 debut in a 1–1 draw against Lithuania on 9 September 2014.

In August 2015, Williams was called up to the Wales senior squad for the first time. He was an unused substitute in the 1–0 win over Cyprus on 3 September 2015.

== Personal life ==
Williams was born in Bangor, North Wales. He is a fluent Welsh speaker, and attended Welsh-medium school Ysgol y Garnedd.

In March 2016, during a Europa League match between Manchester United and Liverpool at Old Trafford, a tweet was sent from Williams' Twitter account which was construed by many as mocking the Munich air disaster. Williams at the time claimed that his Twitter account had been hacked, he apologised and deleted his account. He was later interviewed about the incident and revealed the anguish the incident had caused him and that he had thought "that Tweet could have finished me in football". He explained that he had not intended to reference the Munich air disaster but that it was a reference he and his friends had regularly made about "flying" when doing well. He admitted that his claim that his account had been hacked was borne from a naive panic and was not true.

== Career statistics ==
As of 23 January 2025

Appearances and goals by club, season and competition
Club	Season	League			FA Cup		League Cup		Other		Total	
Club	Season	Division	Apps	Goals	Apps	Goals	Apps	Goals	Apps	Goals	Apps	Goals
Liverpool	2014–15	Premier League	0	0	0	0	1	0	0	0	1	0
Notts County (loan)	2014–15	League One	8	0	0	0	—		0	0	8	0
Swindon Town (loan)	2015–16	League One	9	0	0	0	1	0	0	0	10	0
Rochdale (loan)	2017–18	League One	12	0	0	0	0	0	2 (Note: Appearance(s) in EFL Trophy)	0	14	0
Rochdale	2018–19	League One	28	0	1	0	1	0	3	0	33	0
Rochdale	2019–20	League One	28	0	5	1	2	0	0	0	35	1
Rochdale	Total		68	0	6	1	3	0	5	0	82	1
Blackpool	2020–21	League One	10	0	1	0	0	0	3	0	14	0
Bolton Wanderers	2020–21	League Two	21	0	—		—		—		21	0
Bolton Wanderers	2021–22	League One	40	1	1	0	1	0	2	0	44	1
Bolton Wanderers	2022–23	League One	28	0	0	0	2	0	5	0	35	0
Bolton Wanderers	Total		89	1	1	0	3	0	7	0	100	1
Milton Keynes Dons	2023–24	League Two	37	1	1	0	1	0	3 (Note: 1 appearance in the EFL Trophy, 2 appearances 2023–24 EFL League Two play-offs)	0	42	1
Milton Keynes Dons	2024–25	League Two	13	1	1	0	0	0	2	0	16	1
Milton Keynes Dons	Total		50	2	2	0	1	0	4	0	57	2
Barrow	2024–25	League Two	0	0	0	0	0	0	0	0	0	0
Career total			234	3	10	1	9	0	19	0	272	4

== Honours ==
Bolton Wanderers

- EFL League Two third-place (promotion): 2020–21
- EFL Trophy: 2022–23
