= Kieran Sadlier =

Irish footballer (born 1994)

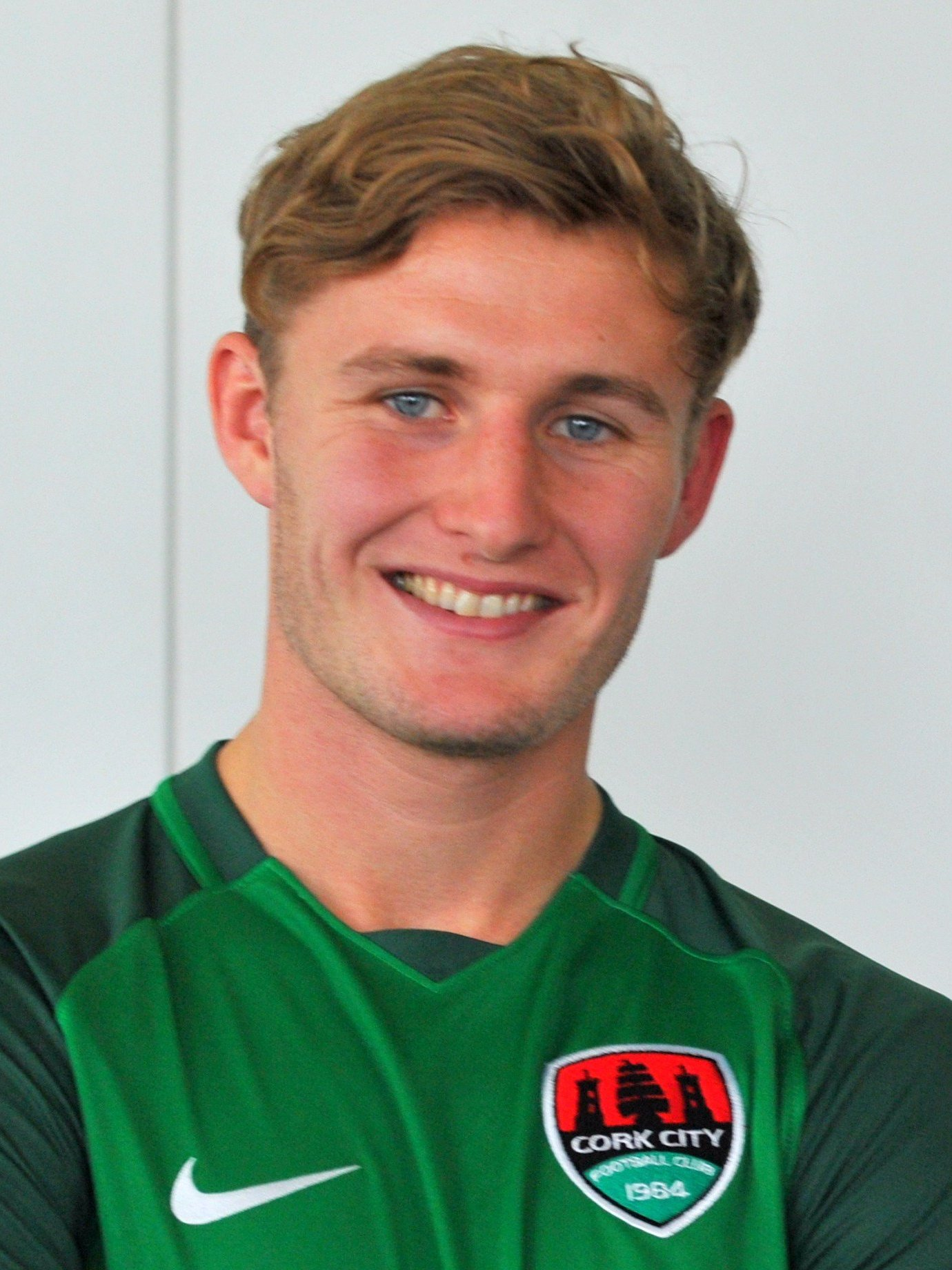
- Sadlier in 2017

Personal information
- Full name: Kieran Paul Sadlier
- Date of birth: 14 September 1994 (age 32)
- Place of birth: Haywards Heath, England
- Height: 5 ft 10 in (1.78 m)
- Positions: Midfielder; wing-back

Team information
- Current team: Sporting JAX
- Number: 10

Youth career
- Cambridge United
- 2005–2013: West Ham United

Senior career*
Years	Team	Apps	(Gls)
2013–2015	West Ham United	0	(0)
2015	St Mirren	11	(1)
2015–2016	Peterborough United	0	(0)
2015	→ FC Halifax Town (loan)	8	(0)
2016–2017	Sligo Rovers	49	(15)
2017–2018	Cork City	48	(18)
2018–2020	Doncaster Rovers	47	(14)
2020–2022	Rotherham United	27	(2)
2022–2023	Bolton Wanderers	37	(5)
2023	→ Leyton Orient (loan)	19	(1)
2023–2025	Wycombe Wanderers	47	(4)
2026–	Sporting JAX	29	(10)

International career
2010–2012	Republic of Ireland U17	2	(0)
2012–2013	Republic of Ireland U19	10	(1)
2014	Republic of Ireland U21	5	(0)
- * Club domestic league appearances and goals as of 16:50, 8 November 2026 (UTC)

Kieran Paul Sadlier (born 14 September 1994) is a professional footballer who plays as a midfielder for USL Championship club Sporting JAX. He can also play as a wing-back. Born in England, he has represented the Republic of Ireland at youth level.

Sadlier previously won both the League of Ireland Premier Division and FAI Cup in his first season with Cork City.

== Club career ==
=== West Ham United ===
A youth team player with Cambridge United, Sadlier joined West Ham United in 2005. After finishing top goal scorer for the U18s in their 2012–13 season, Sadlier went on to feature regularly for the U21s, he requested to be released from his contract early in January 2015 in order to sign for St Mirren until the end of the 2014–15 season.

=== St Mirren ===
Sadlier made his debut on 28 February in a 1–0 home win against Hamilton Academical coming on as a half-time substitute for Viktor Genev. He made his full home debut against Celtic on 3 April 2015 in a Good Friday evening televised game that Celtic went on to win 0–2. Sadlier scored his only goal for St Mirren in a 4–1 home victory against Kilmarnock on 25 April 2015.

Sadlier decided that he wanted to be playing back in England to be nearer to his family and left the club at the end of his contract, despite the St Mirren manager Ian Murray inviting him back for pre-season training.

=== Peterborough United ===
On 20 July 2015, Sadlier signed a contract with Peterborough United after a successful trial period. He was an unused substitute against Burton Albion and started against Charlton Athletic in the second round of the Capital One League Cup.

==== FC Halifax Town ====
On 9 October 2015, Sadlier joined FC Halifax Town, on loan from Peterborough United for three months.

=== Sligo Rovers ===
On 11 January 2016, Sadlier signed for League of Ireland Premier League side Sligo Rovers until the summer where he linked up with former manager Dave Robertson at the club, for whom he played under at Peterborough United. After six weeks the club wanted to retain Sadlier on a longer-term contract and signed him to the club for a further 18 months; till the end of the 2017 season. Sadlier finished the 2016 season strongly, ending the season as joint top goal scorer for the club with 10 goals.

Sadlier started the 2017 season with eight league and cup goals (seven league and one League of Ireland Cup) before attracting interest from three Premier League of Ireland clubs; Dundalk, Limerick and Cork City for his signature to join them.

=== Cork City ===
On 3 July 2017, Sadlier joined Cork City.

Having joined Cork City half-way through the 2017 season, after settling into his new club Sadlier finished the season with five goals for his new club; two goals in the League and three goals in the early rounds, together with the assist of the only goal in the semi-final of the FAI Cup that saw Cork City through to the Cup Final. Cork City met Dundalk FC in the FAI Cup Final at the Aviva Stadium on 5 November 2017 where Sadlier scored the winning penalty after the game finished 1–1 in extra time.

In his second full season with the club, Sadlier finished the season as the club's top goal scorer with 26 goals plus 13 assists, helping the club to a 2nd-place finish in the SSE Airtricity League of Ireland, plus reach the FAI Cup final for the fourth consecutive season. At the end of the season Sadlier was named in the official League of Ireland team of the year finishing as the league's second highest goal scorer. He was also the first person since 1974 to score in every round of the FAI Cup, including the final and only the fourth person to do this in the history of the FAI Cup.

=== Doncaster Rovers ===
In December 2018, Sadlier joined League One side Doncaster Rovers on an 18-month contract. He made his debut for Doncaster Rovers on 6 January 2019 in a third round FA Cup fixture against Preston North End He then made his home debut in the 4th round of the FA Cup at home to Oldham Athletic on 26 January 2019. On 9 February 2019, Sadlier came on in the 68th minute to make his home league debut and scored the third goal in a 3–1 home win against his old club, Peterborough United. Sadlier left the club at the end of the 2019–20 season when the two parties were unable to agree on a new contract. In his final season at Doncaster he played 33 league games, scoring 11 goals and was their leading goal scorer.

=== Rotherham United ===
On 11 August 2020, Sadlier joined Championship club Rotherham United.

=== Bolton Wanderers ===
On 28 January 2022, Sadlier joined Bolton Wanderers for an undisclosed fee, signing a two-and-a-half-year deal. On 2 April, Bolton won 4–0 against Plymouth Argyle in the 2023 EFL Trophy Final He was out on loan at Leyton Orient at the time, though still received a medal as he had played in the earlier rounds. He was released by mutual consent on 1 September 2023.

==== Leyton Orient ====
On 27 January 2023, Sadlier joined Leyton Orient on loan for the remainder of the season.

=== Wycombe Wanderers ===
He later joined Wycombe. On 20 May 2025, the club announced he would be leaving in June when his contract expired.

=== Sporting JAX ===
On 6 January 2026, USL Championship expansion club Sporting JAX announced that Sadlier had signed with the team.

== International career ==
=== Under 15 – U19s ===
Sadlier has played for Republic of Ireland at U15, U16, U19 and U21 levels. For the U15 side, Sadlier made two appearances, scoring on his debut against Northern Ireland U15s and was a substitute against Wales U15s, coming on for the last 20 minutes. He made four appearances for the under-16s against Czech Republic U16s (twice), Portugal U16s and Italy U16s and played in three U17 games against Norway U17, Albania U17 and Malta U17s in the U17 Euro Championships.

For the U19 team, Sadlier made 10 appearances, starting in all 10 games, scoring one goal against Switzerland U19s in the U19 European Championship finals held in Serbia.

=== Under 21s ===
Sadlier made his Ireland U21 debut against Qatar in a friendly played in Aachen, Germany on 24 May 2014. He made four further appearances for the Irish U21s, against Germany in Leipzig, Norway U-21s on 26 September 2014 played in Drammen, Norway, both these matches were in the U21 European Championship. This was followed by a double header of friendlies against the USA & Russia U21s in which Sadlier played against Russia, both games were played in Spain.

=== Senior squad ===
Sadlier was named in Mick McCarthy's provisional squad in October 2019 for qualifiers against the Georgian national team and the Switzerland national team. On 29 October 2019 Sadlier was named in an extended 39-man provisional squad for a friendly against New Zealand and a qualifier against Denmark in November 2019.

== Career statistics ==
As of match played 8 May 2023

Appearances and goals by club, season and competition
Club	Season	League			National cup		League cup		Europe		Other		Total	
Club	Season	Division	Apps	Goals	Apps	Goals	Apps	Goals	Apps	Goals	Apps	Goals	Apps	Goals
St Mirren	2014–15	Scottish Premiership	11	1	—		—		—		—		11	1
Peterborough United	2015–16	League One	0	0	—		1	0	—		0	0	1	0
FC Halifax Town (loan)	2015–16	National League	8	0	1	0	–		—		—		9	0
Sligo Rovers	2016	League of Ireland Premier Division	29	8	2	2	1	0	—		—		32	10
Sligo Rovers	2017	League of Ireland Premier Division	20	7	—		2	1	—		—		22	8
Sligo Rovers	Total		49	15	2	2	3	1	—		—		54	18
Cork City	2017	League of Ireland Premier Division	13	2	5	4	—		2 (Note: Appearances in UEFA Europa League)	0	—		21	6
Cork City	2018	League of Ireland Premier Division	35	16	6	7	1	0	4 (Note: Two appearances in UEFA Champions League; two appearances in UEFA Europa League)	0	3 (Note: One appearance in Munster Senior Cup; one appearance, one goal in President's Cup)	3	49	26
Cork City	Total		48	18	11	11	1	0	6	0	3	3	70	32
Doncaster Rovers	2018–19	League One	14	3	3	0	—		—		2 (Note: Appearances in League One Play-offs)	0	19	3
Doncaster Rovers	2019–20	League One	33	11	2	0	1	0	—		3 (Note: Appearances and goals in EFL Trophy.)	1	39	12
Doncaster Rovers	Total		47	14	5	0	1	0	—		5	1	58	15
Rotherham United	2020–21	Championship	15	1	0	0	1	0	—		0	0	16	1
Rotherham United	2021–22	League One	12	1	2	0	1	1	—		6	4	21	6
Rotherham United	Total		27	2	2	0	2	1	—		6	4	37	7
Bolton Wanderers	2021–22	League One	18 (Note: Soccerbase failed to include his substitute appearance Sunderland on 29 January 2021, as such he made 18 league appearances during the 2021–22 season for Bolton.)	4	—		—		—		0	0	18	4
Bolton Wanderers	2022–23	League One	19	1	1	0	2	1	—		6	3	28	5
Bolton Wanderers	Total		37	5	1	0	2	1	—		6	3	46	9
Leyton Orient (loan)	2022–23	League Two	19	1	—		—		—		—		19	1
Wycombe Wanderers	2023–25	League One	47	4	2	0	2	0	—		8	4	59	8
Sporting JAX	2026-	USL Championship	26	10	4	1	0	0	0	0	0	0	18	8
Career total			319	70	28	14	13	3	6	0	28	15	394	102

== Honours ==
Cork City

- LOI Premier Division: 2017
- FAI Cup: 2017

Rotherham United

- EFL Trophy: 2021–22

Bolton Wanderers

- EFL Trophy: 2022–23

Leyton Orient

- EFL League Two: 2022–23

Wycombe Wanderers

- EFL Trophy runner-up: 2023–24
