= 2023 EFL Trophy final =

2023 EFL Trophy Final
- Event: 2022–23 EFL Trophy
Bolton Wanderers	Plymouth Argyle
4	0
- Date: 2 April 2023
- Venue: Wembley Stadium, London
- Referee: Ben Toner
- Attendance: 79,389

The 2023 EFL Trophy, known as the Papa Johns Trophy for sponsorship reasons, the 40th season in the history of the competition, is a knock-out tournament for clubs in EFL League One and League Two, the third and fourth tiers of the English football league system, as well as the "Academy teams" of 16 Premier League clubs with Category One status. With a crowd of 79,389, the Final was the highest attended match in Europe that week. Bolton defeated Plymouth 4–0 in the biggest ever win in an EFL Trophy Final.

== Route to the final ==
=== Bolton Wanderers ===
Pos	Div	Team	Pld	W	PW	PL	L	GF	GA	GD	Pts	Qualification
1	L1	Bolton Wanderers	3	2	0	1	0	9	3	+6	7	Advance to Round 2
2	L2	Tranmere Rovers	3	1	1	0	1	6	7	−1	5	Advance to Round 2
3	ACA	Leeds United U21	3	1	0	1	1	5	6	−1	4	
4	L2	Crewe Alexandra	3	0	1	0	2	1	5	−4	2	

Source: EFL.com

30 August 2022 Group Stage	Bolton Wanderers	4–1	Crewe Alexandra	Bolton
	Bakayoko 5'; Charles 78', 89'; Sadlier 86'		Baker-Richardson 16'	Stadium: University of Bolton Stadium; Attendance: 2,115; Referee: Scott Oldham

20 September 2022 Group Stage	Tranmere Rovers	2–2 (5–4 p)	Bolton Wanderers	Tranmere
	Morris 21'; Lewis 40'		Sadlier 72'; Carty 90+1'	Stadium: Prenton Park; Attendance: 1,779; Referee: Martin Coy
	Penalties
	Hemmings (penalty scored); Hughes (penalty scored); McAlear (penalty scored); Merrie (penalty scored); Burton (penalty scored)		Morley (penalty scored); Afolayan (penalty scored); Isgrove (penalty missed); Sadlier (penalty scored); Sheehan (penalty scored)

18 October 2022 Group Stage	Bolton Wanderers	3–0	Leeds United U21	Bolton
	Böðvarsson 14'; Bakayoko 78'; Sadlier 89'			Stadium: University of Bolton Stadium; Attendance: 2,936; Referee: Peter Wright

22 November 2022 Round of 32	Bolton Wanderers	3–2	Barrow	Bolton
	Afolayan 23'; Böðvarsson 38'; Kachunga 69'	Report	Kay 42'; Canavan 56'	Stadium: University of Bolton Stadium; Attendance: 2,381; Referee: Rebecca Welch

13 December 2022 Round of 16	Bolton Wanderers	4–0	Manchester United U21	Bolton
	Afolayan 68'; Morley 76'; Bakayoko 90+3'; Bradley 90+5'	Report		Stadium: University of Bolton Stadium; Attendance: 4,735; Referee: Martin Coy

10 January 2023 Quarter-Final	Bolton Wanderers	1–0	Portsmouth	Bolton
	Böðvarsson 17'	Report		Stadium: University of Bolton Stadium; Attendance: 4,413 (304 Away); Referee: Bobby Madden

22 February 2023 Semi-Final	Accrington Stanley	0–2	Bolton Wanderers	Accrington
		Report	Kachunga 82'; Morley 84'	Stadium: Crown Ground; Attendance: 4,874 (2,625 Away); Referee: Sam Barrott

=== Plymouth Argyle ===
Pos	Div	Team	Pld	W	PW	PL	L	GF	GA	GD	Pts	Qualification
1	L1	Plymouth Argyle	3	2	1	0	0	5	2	+3	8	Advance to Round 2
2	L1	Bristol Rovers	3	2	0	1	0	6	1	+5	7	Advance to Round 2
3	ACA	Crystal Palace U21	3	1	0	0	2	2	3	−1	3	
4	L2	Swindon Town	3	0	0	0	3	1	8	−7	0	

Source: EFL.com

30 August 2022 Group Stage	Plymouth Argyle	1–1 (4–3 p)	Bristol Rovers	Plymouth
	Hardie 58' (pen.)		Loft 50'	Stadium: Home Park; Attendance: 2,298; Referee: Carl Brook
	Penalties
	Azaz (penalty scored); Randell (penalty missed); Gillesphey (penalty scored); Houghton (penalty scored); Ennis (penalty scored)		Collins (penalty scored); Evans (penalty missed); Greenslade (penalty missed); McCormick (penalty scored); Jones (penalty scored)

20 September 2022 Group Stage	Swindon Town	1–3	Plymouth Argyle	Swindon
	Hepburn-Murphy 90+1'		Jenkins-Davies 28'; Halls 30'; Hardie 88'	Stadium: County Ground; Attendance: 2,026; Referee: David Rock

18 October 2022 Group Stage	Plymouth Argyle	1–0	Crystal Palace U21	Plymouth
	Ennis 90+1'			Stadium: Home Park; Attendance: 1,918; Referee: Ben Speedie

22 November 2022 Round of 32	Plymouth Argyle	3–2	Charlton Athletic	Plymouth
	Cosgrove 13'; Ennis 15'; Roberts 46'	Report	Kanu 8'; Anderson 90+2'	Stadium: Home Park; Attendance: 1,394; Referee: Robert Lewis

21 December 2022 Round of 16	Plymouth Argyle	3–3 (a.e.t.) (4–3 p)	AFC Wimbledon	Plymouth
	Cosgrove 61', 72', 76'		Hudlin 10', 17'; Assal 45+1'	Stadium: Home Park; Attendance: 1,747; Referee: Sam Barrott
	Penalties
	Hardie (penalty missed); Cosgrove (penalty scored); Houghton (penalty scored); Whittaker (penalty scored); Mumba (penalty scored)		(penalty scored) Hudlin; (penalty scored) Towler; (penalty missed) Assal; (penalty missed) Fisher; (penalty scored) Chislett

10 January 2023 Quarter-Final	Bristol Rovers	0–2	Plymouth Argyle	Bristol
		Report	Waine 24'; Hardie 32'	Stadium: Memorial Stadium; Attendance: 3,742; Referee: Darren Drysdale

21 February 2023 Semi-Final	Plymouth Argyle	1–1 (3–2 p)	Cheltenham Town	Plymouth
	Hardie 63'	Report	May 49'	Stadium: Home Park; Attendance: 12,047; Referee: Robert Lewis
	Penalties
	Hardie (penalty scored); Cosgrove (penalty scored); Azaz (penalty missed); Gillesphey (penalty scored); Houghton (penalty missed)		(penalty scored) Sercombe; (penalty scored) Brown; (penalty missed) Broom; (penalty missed) Bonds; (penalty missed) May

== Match ==
2 April 2023

Bolton Wanderers	4–0	Plymouth Argyle
Dempsey 4'; Charles 10'; Kachunga 49'; Jones 62'	Report

Wembley Stadium, London
Attendance: 79,389
Referee: Ben Toner

Bolton Wanderers	Plymouth Argyle

GK	19	(England) James Trafford
CB	2	(Australia) Gethin Jones
CB	5	(Portugal) Ricardo Santos (c)
CB	18	(Northern Ireland) Eoin Toal	(substituted off) 86'
RWB	21	(Northern Ireland) Conor Bradley
CM	16	(England) Aaron Morley	(substituted off) 82'
CM	8	(Wales) Josh Sheehan	(substituted off) 82'
LWB	3	(Wales) Declan John
AM	22	(England) Kyle Dempsey	(substituted off) 74'
CF	10	(Northern Ireland) Dion Charles	(substituted off) 73'
CF	24	(Democratic Republic of the Congo) Elias Kachunga
Substitutions:
GK	12	(England) Joel Dixon
DF	6	(Scotland) George Johnston	(substituted on) 86'
DF	27	(England) Randell Williams
MF	4	(Wales) MJ Williams	(substituted on) 82'
MF	20	(England) Kieran Lee	(substituted on) 74'
MF	25	(England) George Thomason	(substituted on) 82'
FW	35	(England) Cameron Jerome	(substituted on) 73'
Manager:
(England) Ian Evatt

GK	25	(England) Callum Burton
CB	5	(Wales) James Wilson
CB	6	(England) Dan Scarr	(yellow card) 51'
CB	3	(England) Macaulay Gillesphey		(substituted off) 66'
RWB	8	(England) Joe Edwards (c)
CM	4	(England) Jordan Houghton
CM	28	(England) Jay Matete		(substituted off) 45'
LWB	17	(England) Bali Mumba		(substituted off) 73'
AM	26	(England) Callum Wright		(substituted off) 54'
AM	10	(England) Danny Mayor	(yellow card) 40'	(substituted off) 45'
CF	9	(Scotland) Ryan Hardie
Substitutions:
GK	32	(England) Adam Parkes
DF	21	(Netherlands) Nigel Lonwijk
DF	22	(Zimbabwe) Brendan Galloway		(substituted on) 66'
MF	7	(England) Matt Butcher		(substituted on) 45'
MF	18	(Republic of Ireland) Finn Azaz		(substituted on) 54'
FW	14	(England) Mickel Miller		(substituted on) 73'
FW	16	(England) Sam Cosgrove	(substituted on) 45'	(yellow card) 84'
Manager:
(England) Steven Schumacher
