= 2018–19 Bolton Wanderers F.C. season =

Bolton Wanderers F.C.
2018–19 season
- Chairman: Ken Anderson (Until 13 May 2019)
- Manager: Phil Parkinson
- Stadium: University of Bolton Stadium
- EFL Championship: 23rd (relegated)
- FA Cup: Fourth round
- EFL Cup: First round
- Top goalscorer: League: Sammy Ameobi; Will Buckley; Josh Magennis (4); All: Josh Magennis (7)
- Highest home attendance: 17,811 v Ipswich Town
- Lowest home attendance: 5,506 v Walsall
- Average home league attendance: 14,239
- Biggest win: 5–2 v Walsall, 5 January 2019, FA Cup
- Biggest defeat: 0–6 v Hull City, 1 January 2019, EFL Championship
Home colours	Away colours	Third colours

The 2018–19 season was Bolton Wanderers's second season back in the second tier of English football following their immediate return from EFL League One. The season covered the period from 1 July 2018 to 30 June 2019.

== Pre-season ==
Friendlies against St Mirren, Atherton Collieries, FC Halifax Town, Morecambe, Girona, Guiseley and Peterborough United were confirmed. The game against St Mirren was cancelled a day before when the players went on strike due to unpaid wages. Bolton's game against Morecambe was changed from an away game to a behind closed doors match at Bolton's Lostock training ground due to Globe Arena not yet being ready to host football matches.

7 July 2018 Friendly	St. Mirren	v	Bolton Wanderers	Paisley
12:30 BST				Stadium: The Simple Digital Arena

10 July 2018 Friendly	Atherton Collieries	1–1	Bolton Wanderers XI	Atherton
19:45 BST	Giverin 20'	Report	Wright 86'	Stadium: The Kensite Stadium

14 July 2018 Friendly	FC Halifax Town	1–2	Bolton Wanderers	Halifax
15:00 BST	Leacock-McLeod 68'	Report	Le Fondre 18'; Ameobi 49'	Stadium: The Shay

17 July 2018 Friendly	Bolton Wanderers	0–0	Morecambe	Lostock
13:30 BST		Report		Stadium: Eddie Davies Academy

21 July 2018 Friendly	Bolton Wanderers	0–0	Girona	Leyland
15:00 BST		Report		Stadium: County Ground

24 July 2018 Friendly	Guiseley	3–1	Bolton Wanderers	Guiseley
19:45 BST	Purver 6'; Morrison 22'; Thompson 83' (pen.)	Report	Hall 68'	Stadium: Nethermoor Park

28 July 2018 Friendly	Peterborough United	0–2	Bolton Wanderers	Peterborough
15:00 BST		Report	Le Fondre 14'; Ameobi 25'	Stadium: ABAX Stadium

== Competitions ==
=== EFL Championship ===
==== League table ====
Pos	Team	Pld	W	D	L	GF	GA	GD	Pts	Promotion, qualification or relegation
19	Queens Park Rangers	46	14	9	23	53	71	−18	51	
20	Reading	46	10	17	19	49	66	−17	47	
21	Millwall	46	10	14	22	48	64	−16	44	
22	Rotherham United (R)	46	8	16	22	52	83	−31	40	Relegation to EFL League One
23	Bolton Wanderers (R)	46	8	8	30	29	78	−49	32 (Note: Brentford were awarded a 1–0 win over Bolton due to Bolton's inability to hold the fixture.)	Relegation to EFL League One
24	Ipswich Town (R)	46	5	16	25	36	77	−41	31	Relegation to EFL League One

Source: Sky Sports Archived 25 September 2019 at the Wayback Machine
Rules for classification: 1) Points; 2) Goal difference; 3) Number of goals scored; 4) Head-to-head results
(R) Relegated

==== Results summary ====
Overall								Home						Away					
Pld	W	D	L	GF	GA	GD	Pts	W	D	L	GF	GA	GD	W	D	L	GF	GA	GD
46	8	8	30	29	78	−49	32	4	4	15	13	35	−22	4	4	15	16	43	−27

Last updated: 5 May 2019.
Source: BBC

==== Results by matchday ====
Matchday	1	2	3	4	5	6	7	8	9	10	11	12	13	14	15	16	17	18	19	20	21	22	23	24	25	26	27	28	29	30	31	32	33	34	35	36	37	38	39	40	41	42	43	44	45	46
Ground	A	H	A	H	H	A	H	A	A	H	A	H	A	H	H	A	H	A	A	H	A	H	A	H	H	A	A	H	H	A	H	A	H	A	A	H	H	A	A	H	H	A	H	A	H	A
Result	W	D	W	W	L	D	L	L	D	W	L	L	D	L	L	L	L	D	L	D	L	L	L	W	D	L	L	L	D	L	L	W	L	L	L	W	L	L	W	L	L	L	L	L	L	L
Position	3	7	5	3	3	6	10	15	14	14	15	16	18	18	19	19	23	22	23	22	23	23	23	22	21	22	23	23	23	23	23	23	23	23	23	23	23	23	23	23	23	23	23	23	23	23

Updated to match(es) played on 22 April 2019. Source: 11v11 for league tables and fixtures
A = Away; H = Home; W = Win; D = Draw; L = Loss

==== Matches ====
On 21 June 2018, the Championship fixtures for the forthcoming season were announced. Bolton began their league campaign at newly relegated West Bromwich Albion on 4 August and finished it away at Nottingham Forest on 5 May.

4 August 2018 1	West Bromwich Albion	1–2	Bolton Wanderers	West Bromwich
15:00 BST	Brunt (yellow card) 31'; Barnes 45'	Report	Magennis 18'; Wildschut 89'	Stadium: The Hawthorns; Attendance: 25,901; Referee: Geoff Eltringham

11 August 2018 2	Bolton Wanderers	2–2	Bristol City	Bolton
15:00 BST	Buckley 57'; Magennis 60'; Murphy (yellow card) 63'; Vela (yellow card) 67'; Taylor (yellow card) 84'; Le Fondre (yellow card) 89'; Beevers (yellow card) 90+1'; O'Neil (yellow card) 90+3'	Report	Eliasson (yellow card) 53'; Hunt (yellow card) 60'; Weimann 64'; Paterson 81'	Stadium: University of Bolton Stadium; Attendance: 14,112; Referee: John Brooks

18 August 2018 3	Reading	0–1	Bolton Wanderers	Reading
15:00 BST		Report	Wildschut 48'	Stadium: Madejski Stadium; Attendance: 13,318; Referee: James Linington

22 August 2018 4	Bolton Wanderers	1–0	Birmingham City	Bolton
19:45 BST	Magennis 73'	report		Stadium: University of Bolton Stadium; Attendance: 13,821; Referee: Lee Probert

25 August 2018 5	Bolton Wanderers	0–3	Sheffield United	Bolton
15:00 BST		Report	Duffy 5'; Freeman 22'; Fleck 73'	Stadium: University of Bolton Stadium; Attendance: 14,848; Referee: Andrew Madley

1 September 2018 6	Preston North End	2–2	Bolton Wanderers	Preston
15:00 BST	Robinson 11'; Browne 16'	Report	Ameobi 38'; Olkowski 40'	Stadium: Deepdale; Attendance: 16,331; Referee: Andy Davies

15 September 2018 7	Bolton Wanderers	1–2	Queens Park Rangers	Bolton
15:00 BST	Magennis 69'	Report	Freeman 26'; Eze 56'	Stadium: University of Bolton Stadium; Attendance: 13,581; Referee: Oliver Langford

19 September 2018 8	Middlesbrough	2–0	Bolton Wanderers	Middlesbrough
19:45 BST	Saville 34'; Assombalonga 90+5'	Report		Stadium: Riverside Stadium; Attendance: 21,345; Referee: David Coote

22 September 2018 9	Ipswich Town	0–0	Bolton Wanderers	Ipswich
15:00 BST		Report		Stadium: Portman Road; Attendance: 14,755; Referee: Stephen Martin

29 September 2018 10	Bolton Wanderers	1–0	Derby County	Bolton
15:00 BST	Noone 10'	Report		Stadium: University of Bolton Stadium; Attendance: 14,096; Referee: Scott Duncan

2 October 2018 11	Stoke City	2–0	Bolton Wanderers	Stoke
20:00 BST	Martins Indi 10'; Ince 74'	Report		Stadium: Bet365 Stadium; Attendance: 22,116; Referee: Jeremy Simpson

6 October 2018 12	Bolton Wanderers	0–1	Blackburn Rovers	Bolton
17:30 BST		Report	Dack 22'	Stadium: University of Bolton Stadium; Attendance: 15,461; Referee: Darren Bond

20 October 2018 13	Rotherham United	1–1	Bolton Wanderers	Rotherham
15:00 BST	Vaulks 57'	Report	Doidge 84'	Stadium: New York Stadium; Attendance: 10,011; Referee: John Brooks

24 October 2018 14	Bolton Wanderers	0–3	Nottingham Forest	Bolton
20:00 BST		Report	Lolley 12'; Grabban 64', 83' (pen.)	Stadium: University of Bolton Stadium; Attendance: 13,195; Referee: Andy Davies

27 October 2018 15	Bolton Wanderers	0–1	Hull City	Bolton
20:00 BST		Report	Campbell 7'	Stadium: University of Bolton Stadium; Attendance: 13,108; Referee: David Webb

2 November 2018 16	Aston Villa	2–0	Bolton Wanderers	Aston
19:45 GMT	Grealish 4'; Chester 57'	Report		Stadium: Villa Park; Attendance: 30,802; Referee: Oliver Langford

10 November 2018 17	Bolton Wanderers	0–1	Swansea City	Bolton
15:00 BST		Report	McKay 15'	Stadium: University of Bolton Stadium; Attendance: 14,090; Referee: Graham Scott

24 November 2018 18	Millwall	1–1	Bolton Wanderers	Bermondsey
15:00 GMT	Cooper 82'	Report	Beevers 12'	Stadium: The Den; Attendance: 12,554; Referee: Lee Swabey

27 November 2018 19	Sheffield Wednesday	1–0	Bolton Wanderers	Owlerton
19:45 GMT	Lees 57'	Report		Stadium: Hillsborough Stadium; Attendance: 20,861; Referee: Gavin Ward

1 December 2018 20	Bolton Wanderers	1–1	Wigan Athletic	Bolton
15:00 GMT	Buckley 7'	Report	Grigg 25' (pen.)	Stadium: University of Bolton Stadium; Attendance: 15,237; Referee: Simon Hooper

8 December 2018 21	Norwich City	3–2	Bolton Wanderers	Norwich
15:00 GMT	Vrančić 39'; Stiepermann 59'; Pukki 90+3'	Report	Ameobi (yellow card) 14' (yellow-red card) 90+2' (goal) 63'; Beevers 88'	Stadium: Carrow Road; Attendance: 25,811; Referee: Scott Duncan

15 December 2018 22	Bolton Wanderers	0–1	Leeds United	Bolton
15:00 GMT	Lowe (yellow card) 63'; Noone (yellow card) 90'	Report	Bamford 66'; Douglas (yellow card) 84'	Stadium: University of Bolton Stadium; Attendance: 17,484; Referee: Robert Jones

22 December 2018 23	Brentford	1–0	Bolton Wanderers	Brentford
15:00 GMT	Mepham (yellow card) 40'; Maupay 62'	Report	Lowe (yellow card) 14'; Wheater (yellow card) 72'; O'Neil (yellow card) 90+5'	Stadium: Griffin Park; Attendance: 10,512; Referee: James Linington

26 December 2018 24	Bolton Wanderers	2–1	Rotherham United	Bolton
15:00 GMT	Ameobi 33'; Wilson (yellow card) 51'; O'Neil 65'	Report	Robertson (yellow card) 13'; Vaulks 37'	Stadium: University of Bolton Stadium; Attendance: 15,255; Referee: Jeremy Simpson

29 December 2018 25	Bolton Wanderers	0–0	Stoke City	Bolton
15:00 GMT	Donaldson (yellow card) 60'; Vela (yellow card) 69'	Report	Martins Indi (yellow card) 37'; Allen (yellow card) 65'; Edwards (yellow card) 82'	Stadium: University of Bolton Stadium; Attendance: 15,309; Referee: Keith Stroud

1 January 2019 26	Hull City	6–0	Bolton Wanderers	Hull
15:00 GMT	Grosicki 29', 63'; Kingsley (yellow card) 39'; Evandro 62'; Martin 67'; Bowen 76'; Dicko 83'; Henriksen (yellow card) 88'	Report	Beevers (yellow card) 82'; Grounds (yellow card) 90'	Stadium: KCOM Stadium; Attendance: 12,418; Referee: Tony Harrington

12 January 2019 27	Bristol City	2–1	Bolton Wanderers	Bristol
15:00 GMT	Taylor 64'; Palmer 66'	Report	Magennis (yellow card) 44'; Buckley 58'; Lowe (yellow card) 69'	Stadium: Ashton Gate Stadium; Attendance: 19,730; Referee: Steve Martin

21 January 2019 28	Bolton Wanderers	0–2	West Bromwich Albion	Bolton
20:00 GMT	Olkowski (yellow card) 38'; Donaldson (yellow card) 45+1'	Report	Rodriguez 19'; Holgate (yellow card) 45+1'; Barry (yellow card) 73'; Field 75'	Stadium: University of Bolton Stadium; Attendance: 14,750; Referee: David Webb

29 January 2019 29	Bolton Wanderers	1–1	Reading	Bolton
20:00 GMT	Noone (yellow card) 35'; Taylor (yellow card) 58'; Hobbs 90+2'	Report	Gunter (yellow card) 53'; Rinomhota (yellow card) 60'; Swift (yellow card) 63'; Oliveira 74'	Stadium: University of Bolton Stadium; Attendance: 12,195; Referee: Scott Duncan

2 February 2019 30	Sheffield United	2–0	Bolton Wanderers	Sheffield
15:00 GMT	McGoldrick 56'; Sharp 73'	Report	Connolly (yellow card) 62'	Stadium: Bramall Lane; Attendance: 26,131; Referee: Keith Stroud

9 February 2019 31	Bolton Wanderers	1–2	Preston North End	Bolton
15:00 GMT	Magennis (yellow card) 60'; Vela (yellow card) 85'; Donaldson 90'	Report	Browne 40'; Barkhuizen 82'	Stadium: University of Bolton Stadium; Attendance: 17,381; Referee: Andrew Madley

12 February 2019 32	Birmingham City	0–1	Bolton Wanderers	Birmingham
19:45 GMT	Harding (yellow card) 60'	Report	Connolly (yellow card) 69' (goal) 71'; Noone (yellow card) 90+6'	Stadium: St Andrew's; Attendance: 21,682; Referee: Andy Davies

16 February 2019 33	Bolton Wanderers	0–4	Norwich City	Bolton
15:00 GMT	Noone (yellow card) 29'	Report	Pukki 8', 56'; Stiepermann 25'; Buendía 34'; McLean (penalty missed) 63'	Stadium: University of Bolton Stadium; Attendance: 14,006; Referee: Andy Woolmer

23 February 2019 34	Leeds United	2–1	Bolton Wanderers	Leeds
15:00 GMT	Bamford 16' (pen.); Hernández (yellow card) 62'; Alioski 68'	Report	Lowe (yellow card) 4'; Beevers 22'; Magennis (yellow card) 70'; Williams (yellow card) 71'; O'Neil (yellow card) 88'	Stadium: Elland Road; Attendance: 34,144; Referee: Tony Harrington

2 March 2019 35	Swansea City	2–0	Bolton Wanderers	Swansea
15:00 GMT	McBurnie (penalty missed) 35' 80'; Celina 90+2'; Fulton (yellow card) 90+5'	Report	Noone (yellow card) 34' (yellow-red card) 43'; Wheater (red card) 73'	Stadium: Liberty Stadium; Attendance: 17,880; Referee: Gavin Ward

9 March 2019 36	Bolton Wanderers	2–1	Millwall	Bolton
15:00 GMT	Olkowski 48'; O'Neil 60'	Report	Williams (yellow card) 6'; Elliott (yellow card) 84'; Gregory 87'; Ferguson (yellow card) 90+2'	Stadium: University of Bolton Stadium; Attendance: 13,035; Referee: Simon Hooper

12 March 2019 37	Bolton Wanderers	0–2	Sheffield Wednesday	Bolton
20:00 GMT		Report	Fletcher 44'; Aarons 59'	Stadium: University of Bolton Stadium; Attendance: 13,624; Referee: Stephen Martin

16 March 2019 38	Wigan Athletic	5–2	Bolton Wanderers	Wigan
15:00 GMT	Garner 4'; Massey 51'; Powell 55'; Jacobs 69'; Clarke 81'	Report	Lowe (yellow card) 3'; O'Neil 62'; Ameobi 80'	Stadium: DW Stadium; Attendance: 13,664; Referee: Robert Jones

30 March 2019 39	Queens Park Rangers	1–2	Bolton Wanderers	Shepherd's Bush, London
15:00 GMT	Wells 81'	Report	Buckley 35'; Connolly 71' (yellow card) 75'	Stadium: Loftus Road; Attendance: 13,603; Referee: Geoff Eltringham

6 April 2019 40	Bolton Wanderers	1–2	Ipswich Town	Bolton
15:00 BST	Emmanuel 90+4' (o.g.)	Report	Quaner 33', 44'	Stadium: University of Bolton Stadium; Attendance: 17,811; Referee: Peter Bankes

9 April 2019 41	Bolton Wanderers	0–2	Middlesbrough	Bolton
20:00 BST		Report	Fletcher 16', 28'	Stadium: University of Bolton Stadium; Attendance: 12,259; Referee: Stephen Martin

13 April 2019 42	Derby County	4–0	Bolton Wanderers	Derby
15:00 BST	Johnson (yellow card) 28'; Bryson 37'; Mount 45+1', 55', 82'	Report	Ameobi (yellow card) 31'	Stadium: Pride Park Stadium; Attendance: 26,602; Referee: Andy Davies

19 April 2019 43	Bolton Wanderers	0–2	Aston Villa	Bolton
15:00 BST	Beevers (yellow card) 64'; Connolly (yellow card) 79'	Report	Elmohamady (yellow card) 17'; Grealish 47'; Abraham 57'	Stadium: University of Bolton Stadium; Attendance: 17,344; Referee: John Brooks

22 April 2019 44	Blackburn Rovers	2–0	Bolton Wanderers	Blackburn
15:00 BST	Brereton 30'; Armstrong 50'	Report		Stadium: Ewood Park; Attendance: 14,495; Referee: Andy Woolmer

27 April 2019 C	Bolton Wanderers	0–1	Brentford	Bolton
15:00 BST		Report		Stadium: University of Bolton Stadium; Referee: Tony Harrington
Note: The fixture was first postponed by the English Football League, then cancelled by the Football League, awarding Brentford a 1-0 win as a forfeit.

5 May 2019 46	Nottingham Forest	1–0	Bolton Wanderers	Nottingham
15:00 BST	Lolley 28'	Report		Stadium: City Ground; Attendance: 27,578; Referee: Oliver Langford

=== FA Cup ===
The third round draw was made live on BBC by Ruud Gullit and Paul Ince from Stamford Bridge on 3 December 2018. The fourth round draw was made live on BBC by Robbie Keane and Carl Ikeme from Wolverhampton on 7 January 2019.

5 January 2019 Third round	Bolton Wanderers	5–2	Walsall	Bolton
15:00 GMT	Magennis (yellow card) 40' (goal) 61', 80', 87'; Donaldson (yellow card) 55' (goal) 58'; Guthrie 63' (o.g.)	Report	Cook 19'; Beevers 68' (o.g.); Ferrier (yellow card) 84'	Stadium: University of Bolton Stadium; Attendance: 5,506; Referee: Darren England

25 January 2019 Fourth round	Bristol City	2–1	Bolton Wanderers	Bristol
19:45 GMT	O'Dowda 8'; Eliasson 30'; Pack (yellow card) 66'	Report	Beevers 6'; Noone (yellow card) 63'; Murphy (yellow card) 69'; Ameobi (yellow card) 87'	Stadium: Ashton Gate Stadium; Referee: Stuart Attwell

=== EFL Cup ===
On 15 June 2018, the draw for the first round was made in Vietnam.

14 August 2018 First round	Leeds United	2–1	Bolton Wanderers	Leeds
19:45 BST	Bamford 27'; Sáiz 35'	Report	Oztumer 52'	Stadium: Elland Road; Attendance: 19,617; Referee: Andy Haines

== Squad ==
No.	Name	Pos.	Nationality	Place of birth	Age	Apps	Goals	Signed from	Date signed	Fee	End
Goalkeepers
1	Ben Alnwick	GK	(England)	Prudhoe	32	95	0	Peterborough United	31 August 2016	Free	2020
20	Remi Matthews	GK	(England)	Gorleston	25	20	0	Norwich City	18 January 2019	Undisclosed	2020
27	Ben Williams	GK	(England)	Manchester	36	0	0	Blackpool	3 August 2018	Free	2019
Defenders
2	Mark Little	RB	(England)	Worcester	30	35	1	Bristol City	1 July 2017	Free	2019
3	Andrew Taylor	LB	(England)	Hartlepool	32	88	0	Wigan Athletic	1 July 2017	Free	2019
5	Mark Beevers	CB	(England)	Barnsley	29	132	12	Millwall	3 July 2016	Free	2019
14	Jack Hobbs	CB	(England)	Portsmouth	30	27	1	Nottingham Forest	30 July 2018	Free	2019
16	Paweł Olkowski	RB	(Poland)	Ozimek	29	39	2	1. FC Köln	10 July 2018	Free	2020
17	Callum Connolly	CB/DM	(England)	Liverpool	21	16	2	Everton	31 January 2019	Loan	2019
18	Marc Wilson	CB/DM	(Republic of Ireland)	Aghagallon	31	17	0	Sunderland	23 July 2018	Free	2019
29	Jonathan Grounds	LB	(England)	Thornaby-on-Tees	31	15	0	Birmingham City	13 August 2018	Loan	2019
31	David Wheater	CB	(England)	Redcar	32	236	16	Middlesbrough	20 January 2011	Undisclosed	2019
Midfielders
4	Jason Lowe	DM	(England)	Wigan	27	37	0	Birmingham City	1 July 2018	Free	2020
6	Josh Vela	CM	(England)	Salford	24	189	13	Academy	20 March 2011	Trainee	2019
7	Erhun Oztumer	AM	(Turkey)	Greenwich	28	18	1	Walsall	1 July 2018	Free	2020
10	Sammy Ameobi	RW	(Nigeria)	Newcastle	26	91	12	Newcastle United	14 July 2017	Free	2020
11	Will Buckley	LW	(England)	Oldham	28	59	6	Sunderland	1 July 2017	Free	2019
12	Craig Noone	RW	(England)	Kirkby	30	66	2	Cardiff City	31 August 2017	Undisclosed	2019
15	Luke Murphy	CM	(England)	Macclesfield	29	13	0	Leeds United	2 August 2018	Free	2020
19	Gary O'Neil	CM	(England)	Beckenham	36	31	3	Bristol City	3 August 2018	Free	2019
21	Joe Williams	CM	(England)	Liverpool	22	30	0	Everton	23 August 2018	Loan	2019
22	Lloyd Dyer	LW	(England)	Birmingham	36	7	0	Burton Albion	24 September 2018	Free	2019
30	Yanic Wildschut	LW	(Netherlands)	Amsterdam	27	18	2	Norwich City	19 July 2018	Loan	2019
34	Joe Pritchard	CM	(England)	Watford	22	5	0	Tottenham Hotspur	1 July 2018	Free	2019
48	Luca Connell	CM	(Republic of Ireland)	Liverpool	19	12	0	Academy	5 January 2019	Trainee	2019
Forwards
8	Clayton Donaldson	CF	(Jamaica)	Bradford	35	34	2	Sheffield United	1 July 2018	Free	2019
28	Josh Magennis	CF	(Northern Ireland)	Bangor	28	45	7	Charlton Athletic	30 July 2018	Undisclosed	2020
35	Connor Hall	CF	(England)	Slough	21	2	0	Sheffield United	3 July 2017	Free	2020
Out on Loan
	Ben Amos	GK	(England)	Macclesfield	29	45	0	Manchester United	1 July 2015	Free	2019

=== Statistics ===
As of 6 May 2019

No.	Pos	Nat	Player	Total		Championship		FA Cup		League Cup	
No.	Pos	Nat	Player	Apps	Goals	Apps	Goals	Apps	Goals	Apps	Goals
1	GK	(England) ENG	Ben Alnwick	28	0	27+0	0	1+0	0	0+0	0
2	DF	(England) ENG	Mark Little	4	0	1+1	0	1+0	0	1+0	0
3	DF	(England) ENG	Andrew Taylor	27	0	26+0	0	0+0	0	0+1	0
4	MF	(England) ENG	Jason Lowe	37	0	35+0	0	2+0	0	0+0	0
5	DF	(England) ENG	Mark Beevers	34	4	31+1	3	2+0	1	0+0	0
6	MF	(England) ENG	Josh Vela	19	0	12+5	0	1+0	0	1+0	0
7	MF	(Turkey) TUR	Erhun Oztumer	18	1	8+9	0	0+0	0	1+0	1
8	FW	(Jamaica) JAM	Clayton Donaldson	34	2	18+13	1	0+2	1	1+0	0
10	MF	(Nigeria) NGR	Sammy Ameobi	31	4	26+4	4	0+1	0	0+0	0
11	MF	(England) ENG	Will Buckley	34	4	23+10	4	0+1	0	0+0	0
12	MF	(England) ENG	Craig Noone	39	1	25+11	1	2+0	0	0+1	0
14	DF	(England) ENG	Jack Hobbs	27	1	24+1	1	1+0	0	1+0	0
15	MF	(England) ENG	Luke Murphy	13	0	7+4	0	2+0	0	0+0	0
16	DF	(Poland) POL	Paweł Olkowski	39	2	34+3	2	2+0	0	0+0	0
17	DF	(England) ENG	Callum Connolly	16	2	15+1	2	0+0	0	0+0	0
18	DF	(Republic of Ireland) IRL	Marc Wilson	17	0	13+3	0	0+0	0	1+0	0
19	MF	(England) ENG	Gary O'Neil	31	3	24+5	3	0+1	0	1+0	0
20	GK	(England) ENG	Remi Matthews	20	0	18+0	0	1+0	0	1+0	0
21	MF	(England) ENG	Joe Williams	30	0	29+1	0	0+0	0	0+0	0
22	MF	(England) ENG	Lloyd Dyer	7	0	2+5	0	0+0	0	0+0	0
28	FW	(Northern Ireland) NIR	Josh Magennis	45	7	29+13	4	2+0	3	0+1	0
29	DF	(England) ENG	Jonathan Grounds	15	0	12+1	0	1+0	0	1+0	0
30	MF	(Netherlands) NED	Yanic Wildschut	18	2	4+12	2	1+0	0	1+0	0
31	DF	(England) ENG	David Wheater	34	0	32+1	0	1+0	0	0+0	0
34	MF	(England) ENG	Joe Pritchard	5	0	1+3	0	1+0	0	0+0	0
35	FW	(England) ENG	Connor Hall	1	0	0+0	0	0+0	0	1+0	0
36	DF	(England) ENG	Harry Brockbank	3	0	3+0	0	0+0	0	0+0	0
38	MF	(England) ENG	Jack Earing	1	0	0+1	0	0+0	0	0+0	0
41	DF	(England) ENG	Joe Muscatt	1	0	0+1	0	0+0	0	0+0	0
48	MF	(Republic of Ireland) IRL	Luca Connell	12	0	8+2	0	1+1	0	0+0	0
49	FW	(England) ENG	Ronan Darcy	1	0	0+1	0	0+0	0	0+0	0
Player(s) who left the club:
9	FW	(England) ENG	Adam Le Fondre	1	0	0+1	0	0+0	0	0+0	0
9	FW	(Wales) WAL	Christian Doidge	17	1	8+9	1	0+0	0	0+0	0

=== Goals record ===
As of 30 March 2019

Rank	No.	Nat.	Po.	Name	Championship	FA Cup	League Cup	Total
1	28	(Northern Ireland)	CF	Josh Magennis	4	3	0	7
2	5	(England)	CB	Mark Beevers	3	1	0	4
2	10	(Nigeria)	RW	Sammy Ameobi	4	0	0	4
2	11	(England)	LW	Will Buckley	4	0	0	4
5	19	(England)	CM	Gary O'Neil	3	0	0	3
6	8	(England)	CF	Clayton Donaldson	1	1	0	2
6	16	(Poland)	RB	Paweł Olkowski	2	0	0	2
6	17	(England)	CB	Callum Connolly	2	0	0	2
6	30	(Netherlands)	LW	Yanic Wildschut	2	0	0	2
10	7	(Turkey)	AM	Erhun Oztumer	0	0	1	1
10	9	(Wales)	CF	Christian Doidge	1	0	0	1
10	12	(England)	RW	Craig Noone	1	0	0	1
10	14	(England)	CB	Jack Hobbs	1	0	0	1
Total					28	5	1	34

=== Disciplinary record ===
As of 19 April 2019

Rank	No.	Nat.	Po.	Name	Championship			FA Cup			League Cup			Total		
Rank	No.	Nat.	Po.	Name	Yellow card	(yellow card) (yellow-red card)	Red card	Yellow card	(yellow card) (yellow-red card)	Red card	Yellow card	(yellow card) (yellow-red card)	Red card	Yellow card	(yellow card) (yellow-red card)	Red card
1	12	(England)	RW	Craig Noone	8	1	0	1	0	0	0	0	0	9	1	0
2	4	(England)	CM	Jason Lowe	11	0	0	0	0	0	0	0	0	11	0	0
3	28	(Northern Ireland)	CF	Josh Magennis	7	0	0	1	0	0	0	0	0	8	0	0
4	31	(England)	CB	David Wheater	4	0	1	0	0	0	0	0	0	4	0	1
5	6	(England)	CM	Josh Vela	6	0	0	0	0	0	0	0	0	6	0	0
5	21	(England)	CM	Joe Williams	6	0	0	0	0	0	0	0	0	6	0	0
7	10	(Nigeria)	RW	Sammy Ameobi	1	1	0	1	0	0	0	0	0	2	1	0
7	16	(Poland)	RB	Paweł Olkowski	5	0	0	0	0	0	0	0	0	5	0	0
7	18	(Republic of Ireland)	CB	Marc Wilson	2	0	1	0	0	0	0	0	0	2	0	1
7	19	(England)	CM	Gary O'Neil	5	0	0	0	0	0	0	0	0	5	0	0
11	5	(England)	CB	Mark Beevers	4	0	0	0	0	0	0	0	0	4	0	0
11	8	(England)	CF	Clayton Donaldson	3	0	0	1	0	0	0	0	0	4	0	0
13	11	(England)	LW	Will Buckley	3	0	0	0	0	0	0	0	0	3	0	0
13	17	(England)	CB	Callum Connolly	3	0	0	0	0	0	0	0	0	3	0	0
15	3	(England)	LB	Andrew Taylor	2	0	0	0	0	0	0	0	0	2	0	0
15	15	(England)	CM	Luke Murphy	1	0	0	1	0	0	0	0	0	2	0	0
15	29	(England)	LB	Jonathan Grounds	2	0	0	0	0	0	0	0	0	2	0	0
18	—	(England)	CF	Adam Le Fondre	1	0	0	0	0	0	0	0	0	1	0	0
Total					74	2	2	5	0	0	0	0	0	79	2	2

== Transfers ==
=== Transfers in ===
Date from	Position	Nationality	Name	From	Fee	Ref.
1 July 2018	CF	(Jamaica)	Clayton Donaldson	Sheffield United	Free transfer	
1 July 2018	CF	(Guyana)	Stephen Duke-McKenna	Everton	Free transfer	
1 July 2018	RB	(England)	Chiori Johnson	Arsenal	Free transfer	
1 July 2018	DM	(England)	Jason Lowe	Birmingham City	Free transfer	
1 July 2018	AM	(Turkey)	Erhun Oztumer	Walsall	Free transfer	
1 July 2018	CM	(England)	Joe Pritchard	Tottenham Hotspur	Free transfer	
10 July 2018	RB	(Poland)	Paweł Olkowski	(Germany) 1. FC Köln	Free transfer	
24 July 2018	CB	(Republic of Ireland)	Marc Wilson	Sunderland	Free transfer	
30 July 2018	CB	(England)	Jack Hobbs	Nottingham Forest	Free transfer	
30 July 2018	CF	(Northern Ireland)	Josh Magennis	Charlton Athletic	£200,000	
2 August 2018	CM	(England)	Luke Murphy	Leeds United	Free transfer	
3 August 2018	GK	(England)	Ben Williams	Blackpool	Free transfer	
3 August 2018	CM	(England)	Gary O'Neil	Bristol City	Free transfer	
13 August 2018	DM	(England)	Marcus Wood	Manchester City	Free transfer	
13 August 2018	CB	(France)	Yoan Zouma	(France) Angers SCO	Undisclosed	
24 September 2018	LM	(England)	Lloyd Dyer	Burton Albion	Free transfer	
9 October 2018	CM	(Republic of Ireland)	Stephen Ireland	Stoke City	Free transfer	
18 January 2019	GK	(England)	Remi Matthews	Norwich City	Undisclosed	

=== Transfers out ===
Date from	Position	Nationality	Name	To	Fee	Ref.
1 July 2018	CB	(France)	Dorian Dervite	(Belgium) Charleroi	Released	
1 July 2018	DM	(England)	Karl Henry	Bradford City	Released	
1 July 2018	GK	(England)	Mark Howard	Blackpool	Released	
1 July 2018	CM	(Turkey)	Jem Karacan	Millwall	Released	
1 July 2018	MF	(England)	Jeff King	(Scotland) St Mirren	Released	
1 July 2018	CB	(Germany)	Jan Kirchhoff	(Germany) 1. FC Magdeburg	Released	
1 July 2018	RW	(Portugal)	Filipe Morais	Crawley Town	Released	
1 July 2018	CF	(Nigeria)	Chinedu Obasi	(Sweden) Elfsborg	Released	
1 July 2018	CM	(Spain)	Derik Osede	(Spain) CD Numancia	Released	
1 July 2018	CM	(England)	Darren Pratley	Charlton Athletic	Released	
1 July 2018	LM	(England)	Chris Taylor	Blackpool	Released	
1 July 2018	MF	(England)	Ryan White	Free agent	Released	
1 July 2018	CF	(England)	Aaron Wilbraham	Rochdale	Released	
14 August 2018	CF	(England)	Adam Le Fondre	(Australia) Sydney	Released	
18 September 2018	RB	(England)	Stephen Darby	Retired	—N/a	
20 December 2018	AM	(Republic of Ireland)	Stephen Ireland	Free agent	Mutual consent	

=== Loans in ===
Start date	Position	Nationality	Name	From	End date	Ref.
19 July 2018	LW	(Netherlands)	Yanic Wildschut	Norwich City	30 June 2019	
12 August 2018	GK	(England)	Remi Matthews	Norwich City	1 January 2019	
13 August 2018	LB	(England)	Jonathan Grounds	Birmingham City	31 May 2019	
23 August 2018	CM	(England)	Joe Williams	Everton	31 May 2019	
31 August 2018	CF	(Wales)	Christian Doidge	Forest Green Rovers	1 January 2019	
31 January 2019	DM	(England)	Callum Connolly	Everton	31 May 2019	

=== Loans out ===
Start date	Position	Nationality	Name	To	End date	Ref.
13 July 2018	GK	(England)	Ben Amos	Millwall	31 May 2019	
17 August 2018	GK	(England)	Jake Turner	Stalybridge Celtic	January 2019	
31 August 2018	CF	(England)	Connor Hall	Accrington Stanley	January 2019	
7 September 2018	GK	(England)	James Aspinall	Stalybridge Celtic	October 2018	
23 October 2018	DM	(England)	Marcus Wood	Southport	2 January 2019	
26 October 2018	CM	(Romania)	Dennis Politic	Salford City	January 2019	
2 November 2018	CB	(England)	Liam Edwards	Southport	January 2019	
30 November 2018	RB	(England)	Harry Brockbank	Salford City	January 2019	
12 January 2019	LB	(England)	Joe Muscatt	Salford City	31 May 2019	
1 March 2019	GK	(England)	Jake Turner	Darlington	31 May 2019	
