= Connor Hall (footballer, born 1998) =

English footballer (born 1998)

Personal information
- Full name: Connor Matthew Hall
- Date of birth: 18 February 1998 (age 28)
- Place of birth: Slough, England
- Height: 1.80 m (5 ft 11 in)
- Position: Forward

Team information
- Current team: Maidenhead United
- Number: 27

Youth career
- Binfield
- Eldon Celtic
- Ascot United
- 2015–2016: Sheffield United

Senior career*
Years	Team	Apps	(Gls)
2016–2017	Sheffield United	0	(0)
2016	→ Sheffield (loan)	15	(12)
2016–2017	→ Mickleover Sports (loan)	9	(11)
2017	→ Woking (loan)	8	(1)
2017–2020	Bolton Wanderers	1	(0)
2018–2019	→ Accrington Stanley (loan)	13	(0)
2020	→ Chorley (loan)	6	(3)
2020	Woking	4	(0)
2020	→ Chorley (loan)	7	(2)
2020–2023	Chorley	79	(33)
2023–2024	Solihull Moors	3	(0)
2023	→ Farnborough (loan)	14	(3)
2023–2024	→ Brackley Town (loan)	21	(9)
2024–2026	Brackley Town	76	(24)
2026–	Maidenhead United	4	(2)
- * Club domestic league appearances and goals as of 17:30, 12 September 2026 (UTC)

Connor Matthew Hall (born 18 February 1998) is an English professional footballer who plays as a forward for Maidenhead United.

Progressing through the English football league pyramid featuring for the likes of Binfield and Ascot United, Hall earned himself a move to Football League side Sheffield United in December 2015 and signed his first professional deal just over a year later. Impressive loan spells at Sheffield and Mickleover Sports rewarded Hall with a move to National League side Woking before joining Bolton Wanderers in July 2017. He went on to make his professional debut during their FA Cup third round tie against Huddersfield Town just over six months later, before joining Accrington Stanley on a six-month loan in August 2018.

Ahead of the 2020–21 campaign, Hall returned to Woking on a one-year deal. He later re-joined Chorley on a permanent basis following a short-term loan spell. Following two successful years back at Chorley, Hall was rewarded with a move to National League side, Solihull Moors. In September 2023, he joined Farnborough on a short-term loan.

Connor is the older brother of Newcastle United player, Lewis Hall.

== Club career ==
=== Sheffield United ===
After youth spells with Binfield, Eldon Celtic and Ascot United, Hall joined Football League side Sheffield United in December 2015 on a scholar basis. On 6 May 2016, Hall signed his first professional contract along with fellow academy players; Aaron Ramsdale, Shea Gordon, Kimarni Smith and Nathaniel Crofts.

In September 2016, Hall joined Northern Premier League Division One South side Sheffield on a three-month loan deal. On 10 September 2016, Hall made his Sheffield debut in their 4–2 home victory over Rugby Town, featuring for 89 minutes before being replaced by Pat Lindley. After a month at Sheffield, Hall finally registered his first goal for the club in their 3–0 home victory over Basford United. Following his first goal for the club, Hall went on to net twelve more times for Sheffield, scoring four during their 5–2 victory against Northwich Victoria.

On 6 December 2016, following an impressive loan spell at Sheffield, Hall joined Mickleover Sports on a one-month loan deal. Hall went on to net eleven times in nine games, including five in Mickleover's 7–0 victory against Ilkeston on 26 December 2016.

On 5 January 2017, Hall joined National League side Woking on a one-month loan deal. Two days later, Hall made his Woking debut during their 2–1 away defeat against Wrexham, featuring up until the 71st minute before being replaced by Chike Kandi. On 7 February 2017, Hall's loan spell was extended for a further month. On 17 April 2017, Hall scored his first goal for Woking in their 3–2 comeback against Chester, scoring the equalising goal for the Cards, before fellow forward Gozie Ugwu sealed the victory in the 90th minute.

=== Bolton Wanderers ===
On 3 July 2017, following his release from Sheffield United, Hall joined Championship side Bolton Wanderers on a one-year deal following a successful trial period. On 6 January 2018, Hall made his professional debut during Bolton's FA Cup third round tie against Huddersfield Town, replacing Mark Little in the 2–1 defeat. On 6 May 2018, after netting twenty-two times during the 2017–18 under-23 campaign, Hall was rewarded with the Bolton Wanderers Young Player of the Year award.

Despite the club exercising an option to extend Hall's contract for a further year in early June, he subsequently signed a new two-year deal later that month with a view to more first-team football. On 14 August 2018, Hall made his first start for Bolton during their 2–1 defeat against Leeds United in their EFL Cup first round tie, featuring up until the 65th minute.

On 31 August 2018, Hall joined League One side, Accrington Stanley on loan until January 2019. Hall made his Bolton league debut on 18 January 2020 as a late substitute for Ronan Darcy in a 0–1 defeat against Portsmouth. Six days later Hall signed for Chorley on loan for the rest of the season. He made his Chorley debut on 25 January, starting in a 0–1 defeat against FC Halifax Town. On 26 June, it was announced Hall would be one of 14 senior players released at the end of his contract on 30 June.

=== Woking ===
On 14 August 2020, following his release from Bolton, Hall returned to National League side Woking on a one-year deal. On 30 October 2020, Hall returned to Chorley on a short-term loan.

=== Chorley ===
Hall scored an extra time winning goal in the FA Cup first round against League one side Wigan Athletic at the DW Stadium. In the second round Hall scored the equalising goal to make it 1–1 in the 60th minute, as Chorley came back to knock league one side Peterborough United out 2–1 at London Road, with the winning goal coming from Lewis Baines in the 62nd minute On 24 December, Chorley signed him permanently.

Following a disrupted 2020–21 campaign due to COVID-19, Hall scored his first goals of the 2021–22 season during Chorley's 9–0 thrashing of Gloucester City in September 2021, netting in the 31st and 61st minute.

Following three goals in four matches with Chorley firmly in the play-off picture, Hall won the December 2022 Player of the Month award for the National League North.

=== Solihull Moors ===
On 27 May 2023, Hall agreed to sign for National League club Solihull Moors on a two-year deal.

On 29 September 2023, Hall joined National League South side, Farnborough on a 28-day loan. Two goals in his first six appearances for the Hampshire-based side, saw Hall's loan extended until January 2024.

On 30 December 2023, Hall joined National League North club Brackley Town on loan. Two days later, he scored a hat-trick on his debut as his new side defeated Banbury United 3–1.

=== Brackley Town ===
On 1 July, Solihull Moors announced that, following a successful loan spell at Brackley Town, Hall had joined Brackley on a permanent deal. Hall scored eighteen league goals in his first season as Brackley won the National League North title. He left the club at the end of the 2025–26 season following relegation back to the division. In total he scored thirty goals in 92 appearances for Brackley.

=== Maidenhead United ===
In June 2026, Hall signed for Maidenhead United.

== Career statistics ==
As of 12 September 2026

Appearances and goals by club, season and competition
Club	Season	League			FA Cup		League Cup		Other		Total	
Club	Season	Division	Apps	Goals	Apps	Goals	Apps	Goals	Apps	Goals	Apps	Goals
Sheffield United	2016–17	League One	0	0	0	0	0	0	0	0	0	0
Sheffield (loan)	2016–17	Northern Premier League Division One South	15	12	0	0	—		2 (Note: One appearance in FA Trophy, one appearance and one goal in Northern Premier League Challenge Cup)	1	17	13
Mickleover Sports (loan)	2016–17	Northern Premier League Premier Division	9	11	—		—		0	0	9	11
Woking (loan)	2016–17	National League	8	1	—		—		—		8	1
Bolton Wanderers	2017–18	Championship	0	0	1	0	0	0	—		1	0
Bolton Wanderers	2018–19	Championship	0	0	0	0	1	0	—		1	0
Bolton Wanderers	2019–20	League One	1	0	1	0	0	0	0	0	2	0
Bolton Wanderers	Total		1	0	2	0	1	0	0	0	4	0
Accrington Stanley (loan)	2018–19	League One	13	0	0	0	—		4 (Note: Appearance(s) in EFL Trophy)	2	17	2
Chorley (loan)	2019–20	National League	6	3	—		—		—		6	3
Woking	2020–21	National League	4	0	0	0	—		0	0	4	0
Chorley (loan)	2020–21	National League North	7	2	2	2	—		1 (Note: Appearance(s) in FA Trophy)	0	10	4
Chorley	2020–21	National League North	6	3	2	1	—		—		8	4
Chorley	2021–22	National League North	32	10	2	1	—		1 (Note: Appearance(s) in National League North play-offs)	1	35	12
Chorley	2022–23	National League North	41	20	2	2	—		2	1	45	23
Chorley	Total		79	33	6	4	—		3	2	88	39
Solihull Moors	2023–24	National League	3	0	—		—		—		3	0
Farnborough (loan)	2023–24	National League South	14	3	1	0	—		1	0	16	3
Brackley Town (loan)	2023–24	National League North	21	9	—		—		2	0	23	9
Brackley Town	2024–25	National League North	45	18	6	2	—		1	0	52	20
Brackley Town	2025–26	National League	31	6	3	0	—		6 (Note: Five appearances and four goals in National League Cup, one appearance in FA Trophy)	4	40	10
Brackley Town	Total		76	24	9	2	—		6	4	92	30
Maidenhead United	2026–27	National League South	4	2	0	0	—		0	0	4	2
Career total			229	94	20	8	1	0	19	9	299	117

== Honours ==
Brackley Town:

- National League North: 2024–25

Individual

- Bolton Wanderers Young Player of the Year: 2017–18
- National League North Player of the Month: December 2022
