= Sammy Ameobi =

Association football player (born 1992)

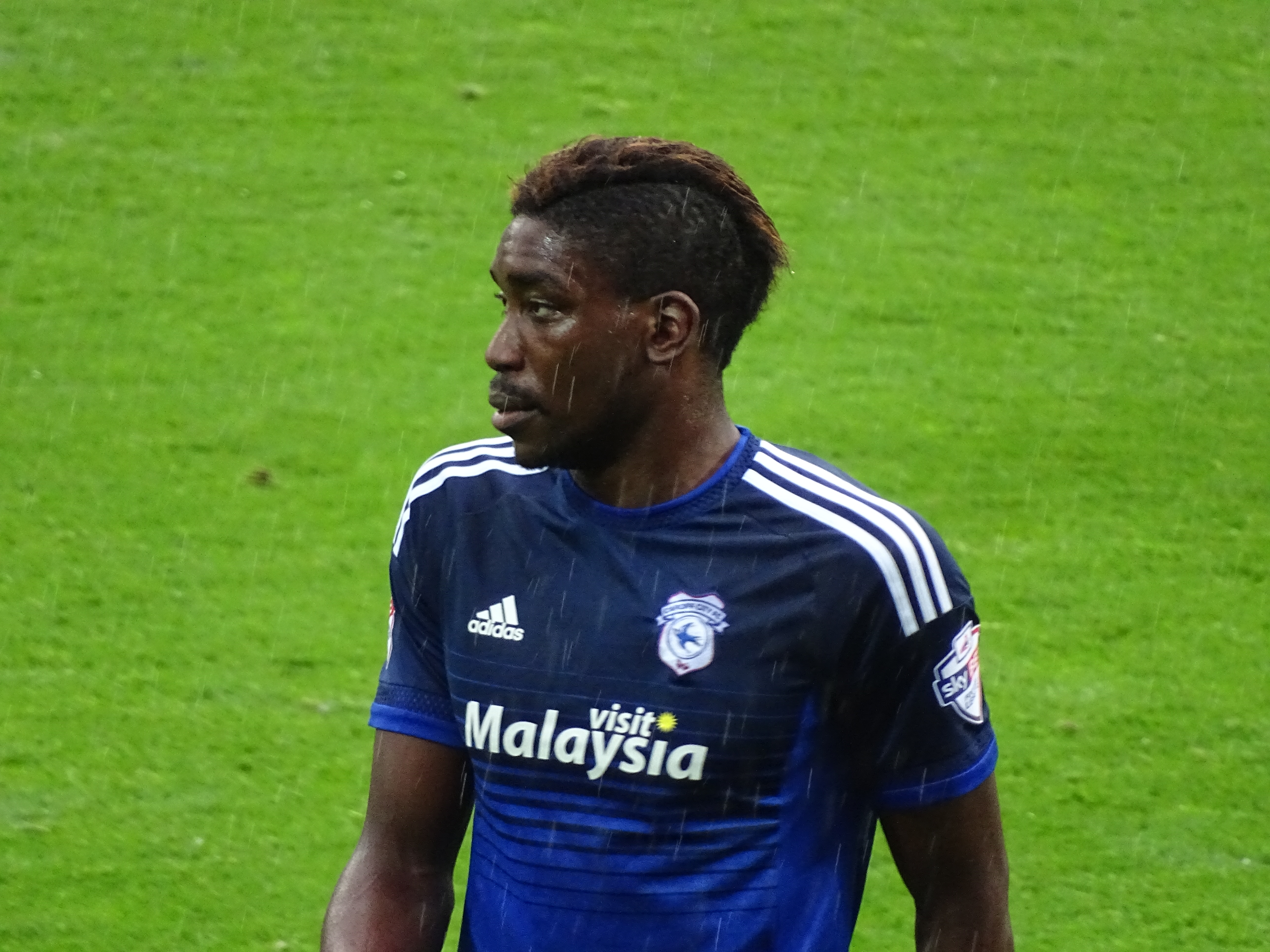
- Ameobi playing for Cardiff City

Personal information
- Full name: Samuel Oluwaseyi Jesutoromo Ameobi
- Date of birth: 1 May 1992 (age 34)
- Place of birth: Newcastle upon Tyne, England
- Height: 6 ft 3 in (1.90 m)
- Position: Winger

Youth career
- 2008–2010: Newcastle United

Senior career*
Years	Team	Apps	(Gls)
2010–2017	Newcastle United	57	(2)
2013	→ Middlesbrough (loan)	9	(1)
2015–2016	→ Cardiff City (loan)	36	(1)
2016–2017	→ Bolton Wanderers (loan)	20	(2)
2017–2019	Bolton Wanderers	65	(8)
2019–2021	Nottingham Forest	77	(8)
2021–2022	Middlesbrough	0	(0)
Total		264	(22)

International career
2011	Nigeria U20	2	(0)
2011–2013	England U21	5	(0)
- * Club domestic league appearances and goals as of 21 June 2021

Samuel Oluwaseyi Jesutoromo "Sammy" Ameobi (born 1 May 1992) is a former professional footballer who played as a winger. Born in England, he was capped by Nigeria at under-20 level and England at under-21 level before switching allegiance to Nigeria in 2014.

Ameobi began his career with Newcastle United, joining the club's youth academy in 2008. After progressing into the first team, he made his senior debut in 2011. However, he struggled to establish himself in the first team, making 70 appearances during a seven-year spell and spending time on loan with Middlesbrough, Cardiff City and Bolton Wanderers. He was released by Newcastle in 2017 and returned to Bolton on a permanent deal.

He is the younger brother of fellow former professional footballers Shola and Tomi Ameobi.

== Early life ==
Born in Newcastle upon Tyne, Ameobi attended Heaton Manor School in Newcastle and Grindon Hall Christian School in Sunderland, and finished school with 11 GCSEs prior to joining the Newcastle academy on a scholarship. His parents, John and Margaret Ameobi, had moved to Newcastle from Nigeria in October 1986. After originally settling in the city centre, the family later relocated to Fenham as John, who had worked as a teacher in Nigeria, undertook a PhD in agricultural engineering. His father later went on to become the pastor of Newcastle Apostolic Church in Spital Tongues and Sammy also became a devout Christian.

Ameobi has two older brothers, both of whom are also footballers: Shola and Tomi. He also has three sisters, Tolu, Titi and Ife. Their father later stated how the family were victims of racist abuse after arriving in Britain, nearly returning to Nigeria before claiming that God told him to remain in Newcastle. Sammy later recalled his own experiences, commenting "There was the odd time when I was chased by someone riding a bike, and had to run home and lock the door behind me." As their father's visa did not allow him to work, the family survived on the £15 a week wages brought in by their mother's part-time job. On the advice of teachers in order to integrate the children into English society, the Ameobis spoke only English at home, and the children eventually lost fluency in their native Yoruba. Ameobi has asthma, having been diagnosed with the condition at the age of twelve.

== Club career ==
=== Newcastle United ===
==== Early career ====
Ameobi said in a 2011 interview that football "wasn't [his] thing" as a child, but seeing his older brother Shola make his first team debut for Newcastle against Chelsea in September 2000 spurred on his enthusiasm for the game. He joined the Newcastle United Academy in July 2008 after finishing school. His youth career was severely disrupted after suffering a serious hip injury, taking a year to recover from surgery in Colorado. He has stated that he "had to learn to run all over again" after recovering from the injury.

He made his reserve team debut on 29 September 2008 against Blackburn Rovers. He made his first-team debut on 15 May 2011 in Newcastle's penultimate match of the 2010–11 season as a second-half substitute against Chelsea at Stamford Bridge in a 2–2 draw, alongside his brother Shola, coming on for Peter Løvenkrands just before Chelsea made the game 2–1. They became the first pair of brothers to play for Newcastle in a league match since George and Ted Robledo in 1952.

Ameobi scored his first senior goal on 15 July 2011, in a pre-season friendly against Darlington. Prior to the goal, supporters chanted, "If Sammy scores we're on the pitch" and thus the goal was followed by a pitch invasion which caused the game to be delayed for 10 minutes. He scored his first competitive goal on 25 August 2011, scoring the winner in extra time against Scunthorpe United in the second round of the Football League Cup in his first appearance of the 2011–12 season. His breakthrough into the first team impressed the club enough that, on 17 November 2011, he signed a new three-and-a-half-year contract extension, keeping him at the club until 2015. Having made twelve appearances in his first full season by December, he was ruled out for the remainder of the 2011–12 season after sustaining a knee injury.

His second goal for the club came two years after his first, scoring in a 2–0 victory over Morecambe in the League Cup. His brother Shola scored Newcastle's other goal, making the pair the first brothers to score in the same match in the club's history. Ameobi scored his first senior league goal for Newcastle on 26 October 2014, within eight seconds of the start of second half against Tottenham Hotspur. The goal was the fastest goal scored by a substitute from open play in the history of the Premier League.

Former Newcastle striker Michael Owen, tipped Ameobi to become one of the Premier League's "most exciting players". However, despite being highly regarded at the club, he struggled to establish himself in the first team. He made 58 league appearances during his seven-year spell with Newcastle, however, the majority were made as a substitute.

==== Middlesbrough (loan) ====
Having not featured for Newcastle in over a month, manager Alan Pardew confirmed that Ameobi had been made available for loan and several clubs had shown interest. Ameobi joined Championship Middlesbrough on 25 February 2013 on loan until the end of the 2012–13 season. On 2 March, Ameobi scored on his debut for the club in a 2–1 victory over Cardiff City. He made nine appearances during his loan spell, scoring once, before returning to Newcastle.

==== Cardiff City (loan) ====
On 7 July 2015, Ameobi joined Championship team Cardiff City on a season-long loan. He made his debut for the Bluebirds on the opening day of the 2015–16 season as a substitute in place of Alex Revell during a 1–1 draw with Fulham, before being handed his first start three days later in the first round of the Football League Cup, playing 73 minutes in a 1–0 victory over AFC Wimbledon before being replaced by Kadeem Harris. His only goal of the loan spell came in the third league game of the season, a 2–0 victory over Wolverhampton Wanderers.

Ameobi made 39 appearances in all competitions during his loan spell with Cardiff as the club fell short of a play-off place, but only 11 of these were starts. Cardiff manager Russell Slade stated that the club felt the need to manage Ameobi's playing time as the winger was suffering from asthma and had been struggling to breathe in training sessions during the early part of his loan spell prior to a change of medication to manage the problem. Towards the end of his loan spell, Slade described Ameobi as an "enigma" and commented "Sammy has fantastic ability, we watch him in training every day, but not always has he transferred that to the pitch."

==== Bolton Wanderers (loan) ====
During the 2016 summer transfer window, following Newcastle's relegation to the Championship, Ameobi was informed by Newcastle manager Rafael Benítez that he was not part of his plans and was free to look for another club while being made to train with the club's reserve side. On 31 August 2016, he joined Football League One side Bolton Wanderers on a six-month loan deal following in the footsteps of his sibling Shola, who had a short spell at Bolton in the previous season. Three days later he made his Bolton debut in a 1–1 draw with Southend United at the Macron Stadium, coming on as a substitute for fellow debutant James Henry. He was initially restricted to substitute appearances following his late arrival to the squad but was quickly tipped by manager Phil Parkinson to be a "game-changer" for Bolton. He scored his first goal for Bolton in an EFL Trophy tie against Blackpool on 4 October 2016.

Ameobi returned to Newcastle in January 2017 after they rejected Bolton's request to extend the loan deal over unpaid fees from his original loan. As Bolton had been placed under a transfer embargo, they were unable to pay loan fees but had agreed to make up the amount by paying the player's wages during the loan spell. However, the club failed to pay the full amount, prompting Ameobi's return to his parent club to bolster Benítez's squad. Ameobi featured four times for Newcastle during the second half of the season before being released by the club at the end of the season following the expiration of his contract, ending a ten-year association.

=== Bolton Wanderers ===
On 14 July 2017, Ameobi signed a permanent deal to return to Bolton, who had been promoted to the Championship, on a one-year contract. However, a knee injury sustained prior to the start of the season resulted in his first appearance coming two months into the season, during a 2–0 defeat to Bristol City on 26 September 2017. In his first six appearances of the season, he scored three times resulting in his nomination for the Professional Footballers' Association (PFA) Championship player of the month for October. In his first full season with the club, he made 36 appearances in all competitions, scoring four times, to help the club avoid relegation.

He signed a two-year extension to his contract in June 2018, turning down offers from several other Championship clubs. Soon after, Ameobi was one of several players who became embroiled in a dispute over pay with club chairman Ken Anderson when the club failed to pay promised bonuses from the previous season, leading to a preseason friendly against St. Mirren being cancelled after the players took industrial action. The two sides eventually reached an "amicable agreement" over the payment row.

=== Nottingham Forest ===
After cancelling the final year of his contract with Bolton, Ameobi joined Nottingham Forest on a one-year deal on 24 June 2019. He scored his first goal for Forest in a 3–2 win against Stoke City on 27 September. He became a key player for Forest during the season, making over 45 appearances in all competitions, scoring 5 goals and assisting 9.

Ameobi agreed a one-year extension to his Nottingham Forest contract, keeping him at Forest until the end of the 2020-21 season. His first goal of the 2020–21 season came on 20 October 2020 in a 1–1 draw with Rotherham United. He went on to score two more goals that season, both coming in a 3–1 win over Millwall. Ameobi was released by Forest following the 2020-21 season.

=== Middlesbrough ===
After being released by Nottingham Forest, Ameobi signed for Middlesbrough which was announced on 29 June 2021, however he missed the entire season due to injury. He was released in June 2022 without making an appearance for the club.

== International career ==
Ameobi joined the Nigeria U-20 squad training in Turkey ahead of the 2011 African Youth Championship. He appeared in two friendly games for the side against Saudi Arabia and Egypt. However, in November 2011, he was called up to the England U-21 squad for matches against Iceland and Belgium by Stuart Pearce as an injury replacement for Connor Wickham. On 10 November, Ameobi made his England Under-21 debut against Iceland in a 5–0 win, as an early substitute in place of Nathan Delfouneso, to maintain England's perfect start to their Euro 2013 Under-21 Qualifying group. Four days later, Ameobi made his first start for the side against Belgium under-21s. England were winning 1–0 when Ameobi was substituted after 67 minutes; the game eventually ended 2–1 to Belgium.

On 6 August 2014, Ameobi confirmed that he has chosen to follow elder brother Shola in declaring for Nigeria.

== Career statistics ==
As of end of 2021–22 season

Appearances and goals by club, season and competition
Club	Season	League			FA Cup		League Cup		Other		Total	
Club	Season	Division	Apps	Goals	Apps	Goals	Apps	Goals	Apps	Goals	Apps	Goals
Newcastle United	2010–11	Premier League	1	0	0	0	0	0	—		1	0
Newcastle United	2011–12	Premier League	9	0	0	0	3	1	—		12	1
Newcastle United	2012–13	Premier League	8	0	1	0	0	0	5 (Note: Appearances in Europa League)	0	14	0
Newcastle United	2013–14	Premier League	10	0	0	0	2	1	—		12	1
Newcastle United	2014–15	Premier League	25	2	0	0	2	0	—		27	2
Newcastle United	2016–17	Championship	4	0	—		0	0	—		4	0
Newcastle United	Total		57	2	1	0	7	2	5	0	70	4
Middlesbrough (loan)	2012–13	Championship	9	1	0	0	0	0	—		9	1
Cardiff City (loan)	2015–16	Championship	36	1	1	0	2	0	—		39	1
Bolton Wanderers (loan)	2016–17	League One	20	2	2	1	0	0	2 (Note: Appearances in the EFL Trophy)	1	24	4
Bolton Wanderers	2017–18	Championship	35	4	1	0	0	0	—		36	4
Bolton Wanderers	2018–19	Championship	30	4	1	0	0	0	—		31	4
Bolton Wanderers	Total		85	10	4	1	0	0	2	1	91	12
Nottingham Forest	2019–20	Championship	45	5	0	0	2	0	—		47	5
Nottingham Forest	2020–21	Championship	32	3	1	0	1	0	—		34	3
Nottingham Forest	Total		77	8	1	0	3	0	0	0	81	8
Middlesbrough	2021–22	Championship	0	0	0	0	0	0	—		0	0
Career total			264	22	7	1	12	2	7	1	290	26
