= 2017–18 Bolton Wanderers F.C. season =

Bolton Wanderers
2017–18 season
- Chairman: Ken Anderson
- Manager: Phil Parkinson
- Stadium: Macron Stadium
- Championship: 21st
- FA Cup: Third round
- League Cup: Third round
- Top goalscorer: League: Gary Madine (10); All: Gary Madine (10)
- Highest home attendance: 21,097 v Birmingham City; 3 April 2018
- Lowest home attendance: 6,385 v Sheffield Wednesday; 22 August 2017
- Average home league attendance: 15,887
Home colours	Away colours	Third colours

The 2017–18 season is Bolton Wanderers's first season back in the second tier of English football following their immediate return from EFL League One. The season covered the period from 1 July 2017 to 30 June 2018.

== Pre-season ==
On 9 May 2017 the club announced that they would host Stoke City on 29 July, a week before their league campaign commences. Two days later, Reece Wabara, Liam Trotter, Lewis Buxton, Tom Walker and Will Jääskeläinen were all confirmed to be leaving the club at the end of their contracts on 30 June, with Conor Wilkinson being allowed to speak to other clubs. The next week five of the club's young players, including Alex Samizadeh and Jack Earing who had previously played for the first team, were offered third year scholarships. On 19 May, a second pre season friendly was announced against National League North side Stockport County on 25 July. Later the same day they confirmed that Lawrie Wilson, Dean Moxey and Mark Davies would also be leaving the club at the end of their contracts. On 24 May, the club confirmed that Jem Karacan had signed a one-year deal, with an option for a further year, keeping him at the club until at least June 2018. A day later Andrew Taylor, who had spent the previous season on loan at the club, joined on a permanent basis on a free transfer from Wigan Athletic on a two-year deal.

26 May saw the club announce more pre-season fixtures. They would travel to Chorley on 8 July and then Fleetwood Town on 22 July. Meanwhile, a Bolton XI would play West Didsbury & Chorlton, Atherton Collieries, F.C. United of Manchester and Marine. The game against West Didsbury & Chorlton was later postponed to a later date. Four days later a fifth match, this one at AFC Fylde, was added to the pre-season diary. Early the next morning the club confirmed that Gary Madine had signed a new two-year contract, keeping him at the club until 2019.

On the first day of June the club announced that David Wheater had signed a new one-year contract with the option of an extension. Five days later, Adam Le Fondre was also signed up, this time on a two-year contract with the option of an extension. Dorian Dervite was the next to sign a new contract, agreeing a new one-year deal, with the option of an extension, on 9 June. A two-year shirt sponsorship deal with the bookmaker Betfred was announced on 12 June. The EFL retained and released list from 13 June confirmed that further players, including George Newell, had been released. Mark Little became the first new player to join the club when it was announced that he was joining from Bristol City on 16 June. On 20 June, Filipe Morais signed a one-year extension to his contract, keeping him at the club until June 2018. A further friendly, this time at Scottish League One side Arbroath on 11 July, was confirmed on 21 June. Max Clayton became the first player to join a new club when it was confirmed on 22 June that he would be joining Blackpool at the expiration of his current contract. On 27 June, the same day that the squad returned to training, a second friendly in Scotland was announced, this time at Dundee on 14 July. 29 June saw forward Conor Wilkinson join Gillingham on a free transfer.

On 3 July, the same day that the club confirmed that Jake Turner, Conor Hall and Jeff King had signed new contracts, Jamie Proctor left the club for Rotherham United for an undisclosed fee. Former Bradford City player Stephen Darby joined his former manager on 7 July on a free transfer. A day later the club confirmed that former captain Jay Spearing had left the club after failing to agree a new contract.

Pre-season kicked off on 8 July with Bolton meeting Chorley for the Howard Taylor Memorial Trophy. With two separate teams starting both halves, the first half team fell behind to two quick goals but the second half team rallied, with two goals from Harry Brockbank and a Ryan White effort sealing the win. Three days later the club commenced their two-game Scottish tour with a 2–1 win at Arbroath, Adam Le Fondre and Connor Hall scoring either side of an Arbroath penalty. They followed this with the same result at Dundee, Gary Madine and Josh Vela giving them a two-goal cushion in the first half. This was on the same day that Sammy Ameobi signed for the club on a permanent basis following his loan the previous season after his release by Newcastle United and Alex Samizadeh leaving to join Kilmarnock. Bolton secured their first loan signing of the season on 17 July when Adam Armstrong joined from Newcastle United until January.

8 July 2017	Chorley	2–3	Bolton Wanderers	Chorley
15:00 BST	Gornell 3'; Carver 17'	Report	Brockbank 59', 76'; White 67'	Stadium: Victory Park; Attendance: 1,447

11 July 2017	(Scotland) Arbroath	1–2	Bolton Wanderers	Arbroath, Scotland
19:30 BST	Doris 33' (pen.)	Report	Le Fondre 32' (pen.); Hall 53'	Stadium: Gayfield Park; Attendance: 722

14 July 2017	(Scotland) Dundee	1–2	Bolton Wanderers	Dundee
19:00 BST	McGowan 75'	Report	Madine 19'; Vela 29'	Stadium: Dens Park; Attendance: 2,227

18 July 2017	AFC Fylde	0–0	Bolton Wanderers	Medlar-with-Wesham
19:45 BST		Report		Stadium: Mill Farm; Attendance: 1,289

22 July 2017	Fleetwood Town	2–0	Bolton Wanderers	Fleetwood
15:00 BST	Hiwula 18'; McAleny 71'	Report		Stadium: Highbury Stadium; Attendance: 2,541

25 July 2017	Stockport County	0–0	Bolton Wanderers	Stockport
19:45 BST		Report		Stadium: Edgeley Park; Attendance: 1,465

29 July 2017	Bolton Wanderers	1–2	Stoke City	Bolton
15:00 BST	Le Fondre 44'	Report	Joselu 78', 88'	Stadium: Macron Stadium; Attendance: 4,724

== Competitions ==
=== EFL Championship ===
==== League table ====
Pos	Team	Pld	W	D	L	GF	GA	GD	Pts	Promotion, qualification or relegation
19	Birmingham City	46	13	7	26	38	68	−30	46	
20	Reading	46	10	14	22	48	70	−22	44	
21	Bolton Wanderers	46	10	13	23	39	74	−35	43	
22	Barnsley (R)	46	9	14	23	48	72	−24	41	Relegation to EFL League One
23	Burton Albion (R)	46	10	11	25	38	81	−43	41	Relegation to EFL League One

Source: English Football League
Rules for classification: 1) Points; 2) Goal difference; 3) Number of goals scored
(R) Relegated

==== Result summary ====
Overall								Home						Away					
Pld	W	D	L	GF	GA	GD	Pts	W	D	L	GF	GA	GD	W	D	L	GF	GA	GD
46	10	13	23	39	74	−35	43	9	4	10	25	33	−8	1	9	13	14	41	−27

Last updated: 6 May 2018.

==== Results by matchday ====
Matchday	1	2	3	4	5	6	7	8	9	10	11	12	13	14	15	16	17	18	19	20	21	22	23	24	25	26	27	28	29	30	31	32	33	34	35	36	37	38	39	40	41	42	43	44	45	46
Ground	H	A	A	H	A	H	H	A	H	A	A	H	H	A	A	H	A	H	A	H	A	H	H	A	A	H	A	H	H	H	A	A	H	A	H	A	A	H	A	H	A	H	A	H	A	H
Result	L	D	D	L	L	L	L	L	L	L	L	W	D	D	D	W	D	D	L	W	L	L	W	L	W	W	L	D	W	D	L	L	W	D	L	D	D	W	L	L	L	L	D	L	L	W
Position	16	16	18	22	24	24	24	24	24	24	24	24	24	24	24	23	22	23	24	21	21	23	22	23	23	20	21	20	19	19	19	20	19	19	19	19	20	19	20	20	21	21	21	21	23	21

Updated to match(es) played on 6 May 2018. Source: Statto.com
A = Away; H = Home; W = Win; D = Draw; L = Loss

==== Matches ====
On 21 June 2017 the fixtures for the forthcoming season were announced. Bolton started the season at home to Leeds United on 6 August and will finish at home to Nottingham Forest on 6 May 2018.

6 August 2017 1	Bolton Wanderers	2–3	Leeds United	Horwich
16:30 BST	Madine 39'; Le Fondre 67' (pen.); Buckley (yellow card) 90+3'	Report	Phillips 7', 42'; Wood 30'	Stadium: Macron Stadium; Attendance: 19,857; Referee: Simon Hooper

12 August 2017 2	Millwall	1–1	Bolton Wanderers	Bermondsey
15:00 BST	Saville 49'; Hutchinson (yellow card) 68'; McLaughlin (yellow card) 85'	Report	Burke (yellow card) 4'; Morais 62'; Taylor (yellow card) 88'; Karacan (yellow card) 90+3'	Stadium: The Den; Attendance: 12,238; Referee: Andy Davies

15 August 2017 3	Birmingham City	0–0	Bolton Wanderers	Birmingham
19:45 BST	Maghoma (yellow card) 50'	Report	Morais (yellow card) 87'	Stadium: St Andrew's; Attendance: 20,215; Referee: Darren England

19 August 2017 4	Bolton Wanderers	1–2	Derby County	Horwich
15:00 BST	Karacan (yellow card) 35'; Beevers (yellow card) 57'; Madine 90+1'	Report	Nugent 8', 21'; Wisdom (yellow card) 79'	Stadium: Macron Stadium; Attendance: 15,175; Referee: Steve Martin

25 August 2017 5	Hull City	4–0	Bolton Wanderers	Kingston upon Hull
19:45 BST	Meyler (yellow card) 11'; Diomande 13'; Bowen 19', 88'; Grosicki 29'	Report	Cullen (yellow card) 50'; Derik (yellow card) 74'	Stadium: KCOM Stadium; Attendance: 16,207; Referee: Oliver Langford

9 September 2017 6	Bolton Wanderers	0–3	Middlesbrough	Horwich
15:00 BST	Karacan (yellow card) 10'	Report	Assombalonga 13', 71'; Traoré (yellow card) 45+1'; Johnson 78'	Stadium: Macron Stadium; Attendance: 17,385; Referee: Geoff Eltringham

12 September 2017 7	Bolton Wanderers	0–1	Sheffield United	Horwich
20:00 BST	Morais (yellow card) 41'; Cullen (yellow card) 52'; Madine (yellow card) 88'	Report	Carter-Vickers 33'; Lafferty (yellow card) 82'	Stadium: Macron Stadium; Attendance: 14,346; Referee: Stuart Attwell

16 September 2017 8	Ipswich Town	2–0	Bolton Wanderers	Ipswich
15:00 BST	Skuse 48'; McGoldrick 89'; Garner (yellow card) 90+3'	Report	Madine (yellow card) 48'; Wheater (yellow card) 67'; Noone (yellow card) 82'	Stadium: Portman Road; Attendance: 14,164; Referee: Andy Madley

23 September 2017 9	Bolton Wanderers	0–3	Brentford	Horwich
15:00 BST	Burke (yellow card) 45+1'; Karacan (yellow card) 56'	Report	Barbet 38'; Yennaris 62' (yellow card) 76'; Watkins 84'	Stadium: Macron Stadium; Attendance: 13,897; Referee: Darren England

26 September 2017 10	Bristol City	2–0	Bolton Wanderers	Bristol
19:45 BST	Pack (yellow card) 6'; Diedhiou 39'; Flint (yellow card) 61', (goal) 77'	Report	Morais (red card) 45+2'; Pratley (yellow card) 76'; Wilbraham (yellow card) 84'	Stadium: Ashton Gate; Attendance: 17,203; Referee: Tony Harrington

30 September 2017 11	Aston Villa	1–0	Bolton Wanderers	Aston
15:00 BST	Whelan (yellow card) 11'; Kodjia 39' (pen.); Taylor (red card) 90+4'	Report	Wheater (yellow card) 67'; Beevers (yellow card) 68'; Henry (yellow card) 90'	Stadium: Villa Park; Attendance: 31,451; Referee: Jeremy Simpson

14 October 2017 12	Bolton Wanderers	2–1	Sheffield Wednesday	Horwich
15:00 BST	Ameobi 10'; Beevers (yellow card) 46'; Hutchinson 61' (o.g.); Morais (yellow card) 68'; Vela (yellow card) 84'	Report	Hunt (yellow card) 39'; Lee 68', (yellow card) 88'; Hooper (yellow card) 89'	Stadium: Macron Stadium; Attendance: 17,967; Referee: David Coote

21 October 2017 13	Bolton Wanderers	1–1	Queens Park Rangers	Horwich
15:00 BST	Pratley 22'	Report	Sylla 78'	Stadium: Macron Stadium; Attendance: 14,243; Referee: James Linington

28 October 2017 14	Fulham	1–1	Bolton Wanderers	Fulham
15:00 BST	McDonald (yellow card) 86'; Cairney 90+4'	Report	Henry (yellow card) 12'; Ameobi 28'; Wheater (yellow card) 68'; Alnwick (yellow card) 78'; Little (yellow card) 84'	Stadium: Craven Cottage; Attendance: 18,792; Referee: Geoff Eltringham

31 October 2017 15	Sunderland	3–3	Bolton Wanderers	Sunderland
19:45 GMT	Grabban 45', 57', (yellow card) 85'; McNair 79'	Report	Ameobi 32'; Madine 60'; Henry 67'	Stadium: Stadium of Light; Attendance: 26,395; Referee: Tony Harrington

4 November 2017 16	Bolton Wanderers	2–1	Norwich City	Horwich
15:00 GMT	Henry (yellow card) 28'; Madine 35'; Armstrong 40'; Pratley (yellow card) 58'; Wheater (yellow card) 78'; Beevers (yellow card) 85'	Report	Zimmermann (yellow card) 77'; Vrancic (yellow card) 79'; Murphy 90+4'	Stadium: Macron Stadium; Attendance: 14,786; Referee: Steve Martin

17 November 2017 17	Preston North End	0–0	Bolton Wanderers	Preston
19:45 GMT	Huntington (yellow card) 77'; Boyle (yellow card) 86'	Report	Henry (yellow card) 2'; Ameobi (yellow card) 53'; Beevers (yellow card) 67'	Stadium: Deepdale; Attendance: 15,213; Referee: Simon Hooper

21 November 2017 18	Bolton Wanderers	2–2	Reading	Horwich
20:00 GMT	Robinson (yellow card) 14'; Burke 18'; Pratley 23'; Madine (yellow card) 81'	Report	Moore 76'; Bacuna 83'	Stadium: Macron Stadium; Attendance: 13,113; Referee: Andrew Madley

25 November 2017 19	Wolverhampton Wanderers	5–1	Bolton Wanderers	Wolverhampton
15:00 GMT	Boly 13'; Bonatini 25'; Jota (yellow card) 58', (goal) 87'; Cavaleiro 62', 82'; Neves (yellow card) 64'	Report	Wheater (yellow card) 43'; Ameobi (yellow card) 45+4'; Buckley 74'	Stadium: Molineux Stadium; Attendance: 27,894; Referee: Keith Stroud

2 December 2017 20	Bolton Wanderers	3–1	Barnsley	Horwich
15:00 GMT	Madine 20', 39'; Ameobi (yellow card) 37'; Henry (yellow card) 55'; Vela (yellow card) 60'; Little 69'; Pratley (yellow card) 89'	Report	Bradshaw 22', (yellow card) 28'; Potts (yellow card) 56'; Williams (yellow card) 60'; Thiam (yellow card) 89'; Yiadom (yellow card) 90+6'	Stadium: Macron Stadium; Attendance: 14,371; Referee: Oliver Langford

9 December 2017 21	Nottingham Forest	3–2	Bolton Wanderers	Nottingham
15:00 GMT	McKay 3'; Mills (yellow card) 32'; Worrall 60'; Brereton 89'; Bridcutt (yellow card) 90+2'	Report	Robinson (yellow card) 30'; Buckley 45'; Henry (yellow card) 87'; Worrall 90+2' (o.g.)	Stadium: City Ground; Attendance: 22,882; Referee: Darren England

16 December 2017 22	Bolton Wanderers	0–1	Burton Albion	Horwich
15:00 GMT		Report	Dyer 23'	Stadium: Macron Stadium; Attendance: 13,632; Referee: Andrew Madley

23 December 2017 23	Bolton Wanderers	2–0	Cardiff City	Horwich
15:00 GMT	Pratley (yellow card) 41'; Henry (yellow card) 61'; Madine 75' (pen.), (yellow card) 87'; Vela 88'	Report	Damour (yellow card) 56'; Peltier (yellow card) 77'; Ecuele Manga (yellow card) 78'; Halford (yellow card) 82'	Stadium: Macron Stadium; Attendance: 15,344; Referee: Darren Bond

26 December 2017 24	Middlesbrough	2–0	Bolton Wanderers	Middlesbrough
15:00 GMT	Howson (yellow card) 33'; Braithwaite 49', (yellow card) 57'; Assombalonga 67'	Report	Taylor (yellow card) 12'; Beevers (yellow card) 51'; Wheater (yellow card) 88'	Stadium: Riverside Stadium; Attendance: 29,433; Referee: Jeremy Simpson

30 December 2017 25	Sheffield United	0–1	Bolton Wanderers	Sheffield
15:00 GMT	Fleck (yellow card) 29'; Baldock (yellow card) 45+1'	Report	Madine 21', (yellow card) 52'; Robinson (yellow card) 37'	Stadium: Bramall Lane; Attendance: 28,387; Referee: Stephen Martin

1 January 2018 26	Bolton Wanderers	1–0	Hull City	Horwich
15:00 GMT	Madine 20'; Vela (yellow card) 71'; Alnwick (yellow card) 87'; Le Fondre (yellow card) 90+4'	Report	Henriksen (yellow card) 71'; Dawson (yellow card) 78'; Campbell (yellow card) 80'	Stadium: Macron Stadium; Attendance: 14,216; Referee: Geoff Eltringham

13 January 2018 27	Brentford	2–0	Bolton Wanderers	Brentford
15:00 GMT	Jozefzoon 40'; Maupay 90+1'	Report	Little (yellow card) 22'; Wheater (yellow card) 42'; Madine (yellow card) 67'; Robinson (yellow card) 83'; Ameobi (yellow card) 90+2'	Stadium: Griffin Park; Attendance: 9,507; Referee: Andy Davies

20 January 2018 28	Bolton Wanderers	1–1	Ipswich Town	Horwich
15:00 GMT	Madine (yellow card) 37', (goal) 53'	Report	Iorfa (yellow card) 73'; Garner 82'	Stadium: Macron Stadium; Attendance: 13,870; Referee: Peter Bankes

2 February 2018 29	Bolton Wanderers	1–0	Bristol City	Horwich
20:00 GMT	Ameobi 71', (yellow card) 90+4'; Dervite (yellow card) 90+4'	Report	Bryan (yellow card) 6'; Brownhill (yellow card) 62'	Stadium: Macron Stadium; Attendance: 14,172; Referee: Andy Madley

10 February 2018 30	Bolton Wanderers	1–1	Fulham	Horwich
15:00 GMT	Little (yellow card) 17'; Henry (yellow card) 45+2'; Le Fondre 61'	Report	Targett 4'; Johansen (yellow card) 60'	Stadium: Macron Stadium; Attendance: 14,386; Referee: Robert Jones

13 February 2018 31	Cardiff City	2–0	Bolton Wanderers	Cardiff
19:45 GMT	Traore 34'; Morrison 44'	Report	Beevers (yellow card) 43'	Stadium: Cardiff City Stadium; Attendance: 16,013; Referee: Tim Robinson

17 February 2018 32	Queens Park Rangers	2–0	Bolton Wanderers	Shepherd's Bush
15:00 GMT	Lynch 72'; Smith 90+1'	Report	Henry (yellow card) 34'; Little (red card) 54'	Stadium: Loftus Road; Attendance: 12,638; Referee: Scott Duncan

20 February 2018 33	Bolton Wanderers	1–0	Sunderland	Horwich
20:00 GMT	Clough 17'; Wheater (yellow card) 65'; Henry (yellow card) 67'; Morais (yellow card) 90+2'; Ameobi (yellow card) 90+5'	Report		Stadium: Macron Stadium; Attendance: 14,915; Referee: David Coote

24 February 2018 34	Norwich City	0–0	Bolton Wanderers	Norwich
15:00 GMT	Zimmermann (yellow card) 55'; Lewis (yellow card) 90+4'	Report	Pratley (yellow card) 37'; Morais (yellow card) 72'; Burke (yellow card) 76'; Ameobi (yellow card) 84'; Flanagan (yellow card) 90+2'	Stadium: Carrow Road; Attendance: 25,475; Referee: Keith Stroud

3 March 2018 35	Bolton Wanderers	1–3	Preston North End	Horwich
15:00 GMT	Beevers 12', (yellow card) 31'; Morais (yellow card) 36'	Report	Cunningham (yellow card) 45+2'; Gallagher (yellow card) 46'; Barkhuizen 53'; Pearson (yellow card) 64'; Maguire 77', 90+2', (yellow card) 78'	Stadium: Macron Stadium; Attendance: 18,141; Referee: Peter Bankes

6 March 2018 36	Reading	1–1	Bolton Wanderers	Reading
20:00 GMT	Barrow 32' (yellow card) 33'; Edwards (yellow card) 64'; Evans (yellow card) 81'	Report	Le Fondre 45'; Buckley (yellow card) 57'; Flanagan (yellow card) 89'; Henry (yellow card) 90+1'	Stadium: Madejski Stadium; Attendance: 8,631; Referee: James Linington

10 March 2018 37	Sheffield Wednesday	1–1	Bolton Wanderers	Sheffield
15:00 GMT	Boyd 78'	Report	Wilbraham 90+3'	Stadium: Hillsborough Stadium; Attendance: 26,809; Referee: Darren Bond

17 March 2018 38	Bolton Wanderers	1–0	Aston Villa	Horwich
17:30 GMT	Le Fondre 19'; Henry (yellow card) 31'	Report	Chester (yellow card) 18'; Snodgrass (yellow card) 31'	Stadium: Macron Stadium; Attendance: 19,304; Referee: Robert Jones

30 March 2018 39	Leeds United	2–1	Bolton Wanderers	Leeds
15:00 GMT	Ekuban 4'; Dallas (yellow card) 28'; Hernandez 50'; Jansson (yellow card) 90+4'	Report	Le Fondre 54'; Derik (yellow card) 90+1'; Wilbraham (yellow card) 90+4'	Stadium: Elland Road; Attendance: 35,377; Referee: Geoff Eltringham

3 April 2018 40	Bolton Wanderers	0–1	Birmingham City	Horwich
20:00 GMT	Flanagan (yellow card) 54'	Report	Jutkiewicz 40'; Adams (red card) 67'; Davis (yellow card) 75'	Stadium: Macron Stadium; Attendance: 21,097; Referee: Oliver Langford

7 April 2018 41	Derby County	3–0	Bolton Wanderers	Derby
15:00 GMT	Pearce 6'; Vydra 33'; Lawrence 54'; Baird (yellow card) 80'	Report	Le Fondre (yellow card) 78'	Stadium: Pride Park; Attendance: 25,723; Referee: Darren England

10 April 2018 42	Bolton Wanderers	0–2	Millwall	Horwich
20:00 GMT		Report	Elliott 34'; Marshall 63'	Stadium: Macron Stadium; Attendance: 13,810; Referee: Robert Jones

14 April 2018 43	Barnsley	2–2	Bolton Wanderers	Barnsley
15:00 GMT	Gardner 22', (yellow card) 57'; Moore (yellow card) 45'; Moncur (yellow card) 79'; McBurnie (yellow card) 81', (goal) 90+3'; Lindsay (yellow card) 90+4'	Report	Henry (yellow card) 13'; Ameobi (yellow card) 55'; Beevers (yellow card) 59'; Pratley (yellow card) 81'; Le Fondre 82' (pen.); Noone 85'	Stadium: Oakwell; Attendance: 14,138; Referee: Mike Jones

21 April 2018 44	Bolton Wanderers	0–4	Wolverhampton Wanderers	Horwich
15:00 GMT	Wheater (yellow card) 56'	Report	Douglas 16'; Afobe 45+1'; Batth (yellow card) 46'; Jota 53'; Coady 66' (pen.)	Stadium: Macron Stadium; Attendance: 19,092; Referee: Keith Stroud

28 April 2018 45	Burton Albion	2–0	Bolton Wanderers	Burton upon Trent
15:00 GMT	McFadzean (yellow card) 11'; Akpan 28'; Akins 36', (yellow card) 79'	Report	Pratley (yellow card) 33'; Beevers (yellow card) 75'	Stadium: Pirelli Stadium; Attendance: 6,535; Referee: Graham Scott

6 May 2018 46	Bolton Wanderers	3–2	Nottingham Forest	Horwich
12:30 GMT	Pratley (yellow card) 13'; Robinson (yellow card) 45+1'; Le Fondre 67'; Wheater 87'; Wilbraham 88', (yellow card) 89'	Report	Bridcutt (yellow card) 7'; Fox (yellow card) 39'; Lolley (yellow card) 57'; Osborn 70'; Colback 79'; Darikwa (yellow card) 83'	Stadium: Macron Stadium; Attendance: 18,289; Referee: Scott Duncan

=== FA Cup ===
Bolton will enter the competition at the third round stage alongside all other EFL Championship and Premier League sides. They were drawn at home to Premier League side Huddersfield Town in the third round.

6 January 2018 Third round	Bolton Wanderers	1–2	Huddersfield Town	Horwich
15:00 GMT	Vela (yellow card) 18'; Ameobi (yellow card) 54'; Osede 64'	Report	Hefele (yellow card) 40' van La Parra 51'; Williams 52'; Coleman (yellow card) 88'	Stadium: Macron Stadium; Attendance: 11,574; Referee: Roger East

=== EFL Cup ===
Bolton entered the competition at the first round stage and were drawn to play away at Crewe Alexandra in the first round. Falling behind in the first half, both Adam Armstrong and Derik scored their first goals for the club in the second half to send Bolton through to the second round where they were drawn at home against Sheffield Wednesday. Bolton raced to a 3–0 lead over their visitors with goals from Jem Karacan, Dorian Dervite and an Adam Armstrong penalty. Despite Jordan Rhodes scoring late twice for the visitors, and both managers being sent to the stands late in the game, Bolton progressed to the third round for the first time in three years, where they were drawn away at Premier League West Ham United.

9 August 2017 First round	Crewe Alexandra	1–2	Bolton Wanderers	Crewe
19:45 BST	Porter 42'; Walker (yellow card) 52'	Report	Pratley (yellow card) 57'; Armstrong 70'; Derik 81'	Stadium: Alexandra Stadium; Attendance: 3,167; Referee: Mark Heywood

22 August 2017 Second round	Bolton Wanderers	3–2	Sheffield Wednesday	Horwich
20:00 BST	Karacan (yellow card) 13' (goal) 64'; Dervite (yellow card) 31' (goal) 42'; Armstrong 57' (pen.)	Report	Pudil (yellow card) 18'; Rhodes 76', 83'; Bannan (yellow card) 89'	Stadium: Macron Stadium; Attendance: 6,385; Referee: David Webb

19 September 2017 Third round	West Ham United	3–0	Bolton Wanderers	Stratford
19:45 BST	Ogbonna 4'; Sakho 31'; Holland (yellow card) 87'; Masuaku 90+3'	Report	Taylor (yellow card) 43'; Pratley (yellow card) 85'	Stadium: London Stadium; Attendance: 35,806; Referee: Simon Hooper

== Squad ==
No.	Name	Pos.	Nationality	Place of birth	Age	Apps	Goals	Signed from	Date signed	Fee	End
Goalkeepers
13	Ben Alnwick	GK	(England)	Prudhoe	31	67	0	Peterborough United	31 August 2016	Free	2018
33	Mark Howard	GK	(England)	Southwark	31	39	0	Sheffield United	13 July 2016	Free	2018
Defenders
2	Mark Little	RB	(England)	Worcester	29	31	1	Bristol City	1 July 2017	Free	2019
3	Andrew Taylor	LB	(England)	Hartlepool	31	61	0	Wigan Athletic	1 July 2017	Free	2019
4	Dorian Dervite	CB	(France)	Lille	29	99	2	Charlton Athletic	27 May 2014	Free	2018
5	Mark Beevers	CB	(England)	Barnsley	28	98	8	Millwall	3 July 2016	Free	2018
14	Jon Flanagan	RB/LB	(England)	Liverpool	25	9	0	Liverpool	31 January 2018	Loan	2018
15	Antonee Robinson	LB	(United States)	Milton Keynes	20	34	0	Everton	6 August 2017	Loan	2018
17	Derik Osede	CB/CM	(Spain)	Madrid	25	72	2	Real Madrid	6 July 2015	Free	2018
23	Stephen Darby	RB	(England)	Liverpool	29	5	0	Bradford City	7 July 2017	Free	2019
31	David Wheater	CB	(England)	Redcar	31	202	16	Middlesbrough	20 January 2011	Undisclosed	2018
32	Reece Burke	CB	(England)	Newham	21	26	1	West Ham United	1 August 2017	Loan	2018
Midfielders
6	Josh Vela	CM	(England)	Salford	24	170	13	Academy	20 March 2011	Trainee	2019
7	Chris Taylor	LW	(England)	Oldham	31	23	0	Blackburn Rovers	2 July 2016	Free	2018
8	Jem Karacan	CM	(Turkey)	Catford	29	23	2	Free agent	11 March 2017	Free	2018
10	Sammy Ameobi	RW	(Nigeria)	Newcastle	26	60	8	Newcastle United	14 July 2017	Free	2018
11	Will Buckley	LW	(England)	Oldham	28	25	2	Sunderland	1 July 2017	Free	2019
12	Craig Noone	RW	(England)	Kirkby	30	27	1	Cardiff City	31 August 2017	Undisclosed	2019
20	Harry Charsley	CM	(Republic of Ireland)	Birkenhead	21	1	0	Everton	12 January 2018	Loan	2018
21	Darren Pratley	CM	(England)	Barking	33	203	17	Swansea City	1 July 2011	Free	2018
22	Filipe Morais	LW/RW	(Portugal)	Benavente	32	56	3	Bradford City	2 February 2017	Free	2018
24	Karl Henry	CM	(England)	Wolverhampton	35	33	1	Queens Park Rangers	25 September 2017	Free	2018
27	Jan Kirchhoff	CM/CB	(Germany)	Frankfurt	27	4	0	Free agent	22 February 2018	Free	2018
34	Jeff King	CM	(England)	Liverpool	22	3	0	Droylsden	3 July 2017	Free	2018
38	Jack Earing	CM	(England)	Bury	19	2	0	Academy	9 August 2017	Trainee	2018
Forwards
9	Adam Le Fondre	CF	(England)	Stockport	31	74	21	Cardiff City	1 July 2017	Free	2019
18	Aaron Wilbraham	CF	(England)	Knutsford	38	28	2	Bristol City	3 August 2017	Undisclosed	2018
19	Tyler Walker	CF	(England)	Nottingham	21	5	0	Nottingham Forest	31 January 2018	Loan	2018
25	Chinedu Obasi	CF	(Nigeria)	Enugu	32	0	0	Free agent	3 March 2018	Free	2018
35	Connor Hall	CF	(England)	Slough	20	1	0	Sheffield United	3 July 2017	Free	2018
40	Zach Clough	CF	(England)	Denton	23	67	22	Nottingham Forest	31 January 2018	Loan	2018
Out on loan
1	Ben Amos	GK	(England)	Macclesfield	28	45	0	Manchester United	1 July 2015	Free	2019

== Statistics ==
As of 6 May 2018

No.	Pos	Nat	Player	Total		Championship		FA Cup		League Cup	
No.	Pos	Nat	Player	Apps	Goals	Apps	Goals	Apps	Goals	Apps	Goals
2	DF	(England) ENG	Mark Little	31	1	27+1	1	1+0	0	2+0	0
3	DF	(England) ENG	Andrew Taylor	21	0	20+0	0	0+0	0	1+0	0
4	DF	(France) FRA	Dorian Dervite	16	1	13+1	0	0+0	0	2+0	1
5	DF	(England) ENG	Mark Beevers	47	1	44+0	1	1+0	0	2+0	0
6	MF	(England) ENG	Josh Vela	31	1	26+4	1	1+0	0	0+0	0
8	MF	(Turkey) TUR	Jem Karacan	18	1	13+3	0	0+0	0	1+1	1
9	FW	(England) ENG	Adam Le Fondre	38	7	15+20	7	1+0	0	1+1	0
10	MF	(Nigeria) NGR	Sammy Ameobi	36	4	33+2	4	1+0	0	0+0	0
11	MF	(England) ENG	Will Buckley	25	2	14+9	2	0+0	0	2+0	0
12	MF	(England) ENG	Craig Noone	27	1	6+19	1	0+1	0	1+0	0
13	GK	(England) ENG	Ben Alnwick	41	0	39+0	0	0+0	0	2+0	0
14	DF	(England) ENG	Jon Flanagan	9	0	8+1	0	0+0	0	0+0	0
15	DF	(United States) USA	Antonee Robinson	34	0	26+4	0	1+0	0	3+0	0
17	DF	(Spain) ESP	Derik	20	2	13+4	0	1+0	1	2+0	1
18	FW	(England) ENG	Aaron Wilbraham	28	2	3+21	2	1+0	0	1+2	0
19	FW	(England) ENG	Tyler Walker	5	0	3+2	0	0+0	0	0+0	0
20	MF	(Republic of Ireland) IRL	Harry Charsley	1	0	1+0	0	0+0	0	0+0	0
21	MF	(England) ENG	Darren Pratley	35	2	31+1	2	0+0	0	2+1	0
22	MF	(Portugal) POR	Filipe Morais	36	1	17+15	1	1+0	0	1+2	0
23	DF	(England) ENG	Stephen Darby	6	0	4+0	0	0+0	0	2+0	0
24	MF	(England) ENG	Karl Henry	33	1	33+0	1	0+0	0	0+0	0
27	MF	(Germany) GER	Jan Kirchhoff	4	0	2+2	0	0+0	0	0+0	0
31	DF	(England) ENG	David Wheater	34	1	31+1	1	1+0	0	0+1	0
32	DF	(England) ENG	Reece Burke	26	1	22+3	1	0+0	0	1+0	0
33	GK	(England) ENG	Mark Howard	10	0	7+1	0	1+0	0	1+0	0
34	MF	(England) ENG	Jeff King	3	0	1+0	0	0+1	0	1+0	0
35	FW	(England) ENG	Connor Hall	1	0	0+0	0	0+1	0	0+0	0
38	MF	(England) ENG	Jack Earing	2	0	0+0	0	0+0	0	1+1	0
40	FW	(England) ENG	Zach Clough	9	1	2+7	1	0+0	0	0+0	0
Player(s) who left the club:
14	FW	(England) ENG	Gary Madine	29	10	28+0	10	0+0	0	0+1	0
16	MF	(Republic of Ireland) IRL	Josh Cullen	12	0	9+3	0	0+0	0	0+0	0
20	FW	(England) ENG	Adam Armstrong	22	3	14+5	1	0+0	0	2+1	2

=== Goals record ===
As of 6 May 2018

Rank	No.	Nat.	Po.	Name	Championship	FA Cup	League Cup	Total
1	—	(England)	CF	Gary Madine	10	0	0	10
2	9	(England)	CF	Adam Le Fondre	7	0	0	7
3	10	(Nigeria)	RW	Sammy Ameobi	4	0	0	4
4	—	(England)	CF	Adam Armstrong	1	0	2	3
5	11	(England)	LW	Will Buckley	2	0	0	2
5	17	(Spain)	CB	Derik Osede	0	1	1	2
5	18	(England)	CF	Aaron Wilbraham	2	0	0	2
5	21	(England)	CM	Darren Pratley	2	0	0	2
9	2	(England)	RB	Mark Little	1	0	0	1
9	4	(France)	CB	Dorian Dervite	0	0	1	1
9	5	(England)	CB	Mark Beevers	1	0	0	1
9	6	(England)	CM	Josh Vela	1	0	0	1
9	8	(Turkey)	CM	Jem Karacan	0	0	1	1
9	12	(England)	RW	Craig Noone	1	0	0	1
9	22	(Portugal)	RW	Filipe Morais	1	0	0	1
9	24	(England)	CM	Karl Henry	1	0	0	1
9	31	(England)	CB	David Wheater	1	0	0	1
9	32	(England)	CB	Reece Burke	1	0	0	1
9	40	(England)	CF	Zach Clough	1	0	0	1
Total					37	1	5	43

=== Disciplinary record ===
As of 6 May 2018

Rank	No.	Nat.	Po.	Name	Championship			FA Cup			League Cup			Total		
Rank	No.	Nat.	Po.	Name	Booked	(yellow card) (yellow-red card)	Sent off (straight red)	Booked	(yellow card) (yellow-red card)	Sent off (straight red)	Booked	(yellow card) (yellow-red card)	Sent off (straight red)	Booked	(yellow card) (yellow-red card)	Sent off (straight red)
1	24	(England)	CM	Karl Henry	13	0	0	0	0	0	0	0	0	13	0	0
2	5	(England)	CB	Mark Beevers	10	0	0	0	0	0	0	0	0	10	0	0
2	21	(England)	CM	Darren Pratley	8	0	0	0	0	0	2	0	0	10	0	0
4	10	(Nigeria)	RW	Sammy Ameobi	8	0	0	1	0	0	0	0	0	9	0	0
4	31	(England)	CB	David Wheater	9	0	0	0	0	0	0	0	0	9	0	0
6	22	(Portugal)	RW	Filipe Morais	6	1	0	0	0	0	0	0	0	6	1	0
7	—	(England)	CF	Gary Madine	7	0	0	0	0	0	0	0	0	7	0	0
8	8	(Turkey)	CM	Jem Karacan	4	0	0	0	0	0	1	0	0	5	0	0
8	15	(United States)	LB	Antonee Robinson	5	0	0	0	0	0	0	0	0	5	0	0
10	2	(England)	RB	Mark Little	3	0	1	0	0	0	0	0	0	3	0	1
10	6	(England)	CM	Josh Vela	3	0	0	1	0	0	0	0	0	4	0	0
12	3	(England)	LB	Andrew Taylor	2	0	0	0	0	0	1	0	0	3	0	0
12	14	(England)	RB	Jon Flanagan	3	0	0	0	0	0	0	0	0	3	0	0
12	18	(England)	CF	Aaron Wilbraham	3	0	0	0	0	0	0	0	0	3	0	0
12	32	(England)	CB	Reece Burke	3	0	0	0	0	0	0	0	0	3	0	0
16	4	(France)	CB	Dorian Dervite	2	0	0	0	0	0	0	0	0	2	0	0
16	9	(England)	CF	Adam Le Fondre	2	0	0	0	0	0	0	0	0	2	0	0
16	11	(England)	LW	Will Buckley	2	0	0	0	0	0	0	0	0	2	0	0
16	13	(England)	GK	Ben Alnwick	2	0	0	0	0	0	0	0	0	2	0	0
16	17	(Spain)	CB	Derik	2	0	0	0	0	0	0	0	0	2	0	0
21	12	(England)	RW	Craig Noone	1	0	0	0	0	0	0	0	0	1	0	0
21	16	(Republic of Ireland)	CM	Josh Cullen	1	0	0	0	0	0	0	0	0	1	0	0
Total					98	1	1	2	0	0	5	0	0	105	1	1

== Transfers ==
=== Transfers in ===
Date from	Position	Nationality	Name	From	Fee	Ref.
1 July 2017	LW	(England)	Will Buckley	Sunderland	Free	
1 July 2017	CF	(England)	Adam Le Fondre	Cardiff City	Free	
1 July 2017	RB	(England)	Mark Little	Bristol City	Free	
1 July 2017	LB	(England)	Andrew Taylor	Wigan Athletic	Free	
7 July 2017	RB	(England)	Stephen Darby	Bradford City	Free	
14 July 2017	RW	(Nigeria)	Sammy Ameobi	Newcastle United	Free	
3 August 2017	CF	(England)	Aaron Wilbraham	Bristol City	Free	
31 August 2017	RW	(England)	Craig Noone	Cardiff City	Free	
25 September 2017	DM	(England)	Karl Henry	Queens Park Rangers	Free	
22 February 2018	DM	(Germany)	Jan Kirchhoff	Unattached	Free	
3 March 2018	CF	(Nigeria)	Chinedu Obasi	Unattached	Free	

=== Transfers out ===
Date from	Position	Nationality	Name	To	Fee	Ref.
29 June 2017	FW	(Republic of Ireland)	Conor Wilkinson	Gillingham	Free	
1 July 2017	RB	(England)	Lewis Buxton	Free agent	Released	
1 July 2017	FW	(England)	Max Clayton	Blackpool	Free	
1 July 2017	CM	(England)	Mark Davies	Free agent	Released	
1 July 2017	GK	(Finland)	Will Jääskeläinen	Leek Town	Released	(Note: Will Jääskeläinen joined Leek Town following his release.)
1 July 2017	LB	(England)	Dean Moxey	Exeter City	Released	(Note: Dean Moxey joined Exeter City after being released.)
1 July 2017	FW	(England)	George Newell	Motherwell	Released	
1 July 2017	CM	(England)	Liam Trotter	AFC Wimbledon	Released	(Note: Liam Trotter joined AFC Wimbledon following his release.)
1 July 2017	RB	(England)	Reece Wabara	Free agent	Released	
1 July 2017	LM	(England)	Tom Walker	Stockport County	Released	
1 July 2017	RB	(England)	Lawrie Wilson	Port Vale	Released	
3 July 2017	CF	(England)	Jamie Proctor	Rotherham United	£75,000	
8 July 2017	CM	(England)	Jay Spearing	Blackpool	Released	(Note: Jay Spearing joined Blackpool following his release.)
14 July 2017	FW	(Iran)	Alex Samizadeh	Kilmarnock	Free	
1 August 2017	CB	(Scotland)	Sam Lavelle	Morecambe	Free	
31 January 2018	FW	(England)	Gary Madine	Cardiff City	Undisclosed (£6-8 million)	

=== Loans in ===
Date from	Position	Nationality	Name	From	Until	Ref.
17 July 2017	CF	(England)	Adam Armstrong	Newcastle United	1 January 2018	
1 August 2017	CM	(Republic of Ireland)	Josh Cullen	West Ham United	1 January 2018	
1 August 2017	CB	(England)	Reece Burke	West Ham United	30 June 2018	
4 August 2017	LB	(United States)	Antonee Robinson	Everton	30 June 2018	
12 January 2018	CM	(Republic of Ireland)	Harry Charsley	Everton	30 June 2018	
31 January 2018	CF	(England)	Tyler Walker	Nottingham Forest	30 June 2018	
31 January 2018	RB	(England)	Jon Flanagan	Liverpool	30 June 2018	
31 January 2018	CF	(England)	Zach Clough	Nottingham Forest	30 June 2018	

=== Loans out ===
Date from	Position	Nationality	Name	To	Until	Ref.
29 July 2017	GK	(England)	Ben Amos	Charlton Athletic	30 June 2018	
