= Jack Earing =

English footballer (born 1999)

Personal information
- Full name: Jack James Earing
- Date of birth: 21 January 1999 (age 27)
- Place of birth: Bury, England
- Height: 1.82 m (6 ft 0 in)
- Position: Midfielder

Team information
- Current team: Hartlepool United (on loan from Barrow)
- Number: 51

Youth career
- –2016: Bolton Wanderers

Senior career*
Years	Team	Apps	(Gls)
2016–2019	Bolton Wanderers	1	(0)
2019	→ Curzon Ashton (loan)	5	(0)
2019–2021	FC Halifax Town	42	(9)
2019–2020	→ Spennymoor Town (loan)	4	(0)
2020	→ Farsley Celtic (loan)	3	(0)
2021–2025	Walsall	93	(9)
2025–	Barrow	30	(1)
2026–	→ Hartlepool United (loan)	1	(0)
- * Club domestic league appearances and goals as of 16:45, 11 October 2026 (UTC)

Jack James Earing (born 21 January 1999) is an English professional footballer who plays as a midfielder for National League club Hartlepool United on loan from National League club Barrow.

== Career ==
=== Bolton Wanderers ===
Earing came through the Bolton Wanderers academy and made his debut for the first team on 30 August 2016, starting in a 2–0 home defeat against Everton U-23s in the Football League Trophy Group Stage. He made two appearances in the League Cup in the 2017–18 season, starting the match against Crewe Alexandra and coming on as a substitute against West Ham United. However, further first team opportunities were limited and on 12 January 2019, Earing was loaned out to Curzon Ashton in the National League North. He made five league appearances for "The Nash" before returning to Bolton to make his league debut on the final day of the 2018–19 season in a 1–0 defeat away to Nottingham Forest.

=== FC Halifax Town ===
On 24 June 2019, it was announced that Earing would be joining FC Halifax Town when his Bolton contract expired on 1 July. Earing scored just three minutes into his Halifax debut, after coming on as a substitute in a 4–1 win at Ebbsfleet United. On 18 December 2019, Earing joined Spennymoor Town on a short-term loan deal, making four appearances in the National League North. On 23 January 2020, Earing again went out on loan to a National League North side, this time Farsley Celtic, where he made three further appearances. The 2020–21 season proved to be a breakthrough season for Earing as he established himself as a regular starter for Halifax, making 35 appearances and scoring nine goals, including five goals in his last 12 appearances of the season.

=== Walsall ===
On 18 June 2021, League Two side Walsall announced the signing of Earing on a two-year deal upon the expiry of his Halifax contract on 1 July for an undisclosed compensation package. He was a near-ever-present in his first season for the club, making 51 appearances in all competitions and scoring four goals. Earing suffered an anterior cruciate ligament injury in Walsall's 2–1 win over Mansfield Town on New Year's Day 2023, keeping him out until December 2023 when he made his return off the bench in a FA Cup tie against Alfreton Town. He scored his first goal back from injury on his first start on the 29 December 2023 in a 3–1 league win over Wrexham and signed a new contract two days later, keeping him at Walsall until the summer of 2025. He was released after the end of his contract on 30 June 2025. He made 114 appearances in his three years at Walsall.

=== Barrow ===
On 10 June 2025 League Two rivals Barrow announced the signing of Earing on a one-year deal with an additional year option upon the expiry of his Walsall contract. On 8 October 2026, he signed with fellow National League side Hartlepool United on an initial one month loan, re-joining old Halifax manager Pete Wild.

== Career statistics ==
As of 10 October 2026

Appearances and goals by club, season and competition
Club	Season	League			FA Cup		League Cup		Other		Total	
Club	Season	Division	Apps	Goals	Apps	Goals	Apps	Goals	Apps	Goals	Apps	Goals
Bolton Wanderers	2016–17	League One	0	0	0	0	0	0	1 (Note: Appearance(s) in EFL Trophy)	0	1	0
Bolton Wanderers	2017–18	Championship	0	0	0	0	2	0	—		2	0
Bolton Wanderers	2018–19	Championship	1	0	0	0	0	0	—		1	0
Bolton Wanderers	Total		1	0	0	0	2	0	1	0	4	0
Curzon Ashton (loan)	2018–19	National League North	5	0	—		—		0	0	5	0
FC Halifax Town	2019–20	National League	10	1	1	0	—		1 (Note: Appearance in National League play-offs)	0	12	1
FC Halifax Town	2020–21	National League	32	8	1	0	—		2 (Note: Appearance(s) in FA Trophy)	1	35	9
FC Halifax Town	Total		42	9	2	0	—		3	1	47	10
Spennymoor Town (loan)	2019–20	National League North	4	0	—		—		0	0	4	0
Farsley Celtic (loan)	2019–20	National League North	3	0	—		—		0	0	3	0
Walsall	2021–22	League Two	45	4	2	0	1	0	3	0	51	4
Walsall	2022–23	League Two	11	0	1	0	2	0	2	0	16	0
Walsall	2023–24	League Two	17	3	2	0	0	0	0	0	19	3
Walsall	2024–25	League Two	20	2	2	0	2	0	4	0	28	2
Walsall	Total		93	9	7	0	5	0	9	0	114	9
Barrow	2025–26	League Two	30	1	1	1	1	0	0	0	32	2
Barrow	2026–27	National League	0	0	0	0	–		0	0	0	0
Barrow	Total		30	1	1	1	1	0	0	0	32	2
Hartlepool United (loan)	2026–27	National League	1	0	0	0	–		0	0	1	0
Career total			179	19	10	1	8	0	13	1	210	21
