= Joe Muscatt =

Maltese footballer (born 1997)

Personal information
- Full name: Joseph Luis Muscatt
- Date of birth: 15 December 1997 (age 28)
- Place of birth: Leytonstone, England
- Position: Defender

Youth career
- 2008–2017: Tottenham Hotspur
- 2017–2019: Bolton Wanderers

Senior career*
Years	Team	Apps	(Gls)
2019	Bolton Wanderers	1	(0)
2019	→ Salford City (loan)	2	(0)
2020–2021	Paderborn II	0	(0)
2021–2022	Welling United	12	(0)
2022	Billericay Town	4	(0)
2022–2023	Braintree Town	17	(0)

International career
2020–	Malta	1	(0)
- * Club domestic league appearances and goals as of 17:05, 30 March 2023 (UTC)

Joseph Muscatt (born 15 December 1997) is a footballer who last played as a defender for Braintree Town. Born in England, he represents the Malta national team.

== Club career ==
Muscatt began his career with Tottenham Hotspur at the age of ten, before being released at the end of the 2016–17 season. Later that summer he joined Bolton Wanderers after a trial period a signed his first professional deal the following year, agreeing a one-year deal. In January 2019, he joined League Two side Salford City on a one-month loan deal. He left Bolton Wanderers at the end of his contract in the summer of 2019. In July 2020, Muscatt joined the reserve team of German club Paderborn. In March 2022, he joined Billericay Town after a spell with Welling United.

On 13 July 2022, Muscatt agreed to join fellow National League South side, Braintree Town.

== International career ==
On 29 September 2020, Muscatt received his first call-up to the Malta national team. On 7 October 2020, he made his senior international debut, starting in a 2–0 friendly win over Gibraltar.

== Personal life ==
Muscatt holds a Maltese passport.

== Career statistics ==
As of match played 20 December 2022

Club	Season	League			National Cup		League Cup		Other		Total	
Club	Season	Division	Apps	Goals	Apps	Goals	Apps	Goals	Apps	Goals	Apps	Goals
Bolton Wanderers	2018–19	Championship	1	0	0	0	0	0	0	0	1	0
Salford City (loan)	2018–19	National League	2	0	—		—		2 (Note: Appearances in the FA Trophy)	0	4	0
Paderborn II	2020–21	Oberliga Westfalen	0	0	—		—		—		0	0
Welling United	2021–22	National League South	12	0	—		—		1	0	13	0
Billericay Town	2021–22	National League South	4	0	—		—		—		4	0
Braintree Town	2022–23	National League South	17	0	2	1	—		2	0	21	1
Career total			36	0	2	1	0	0	5	0	43	1
