= Jeff King (footballer) =

English footballer (born 1995)

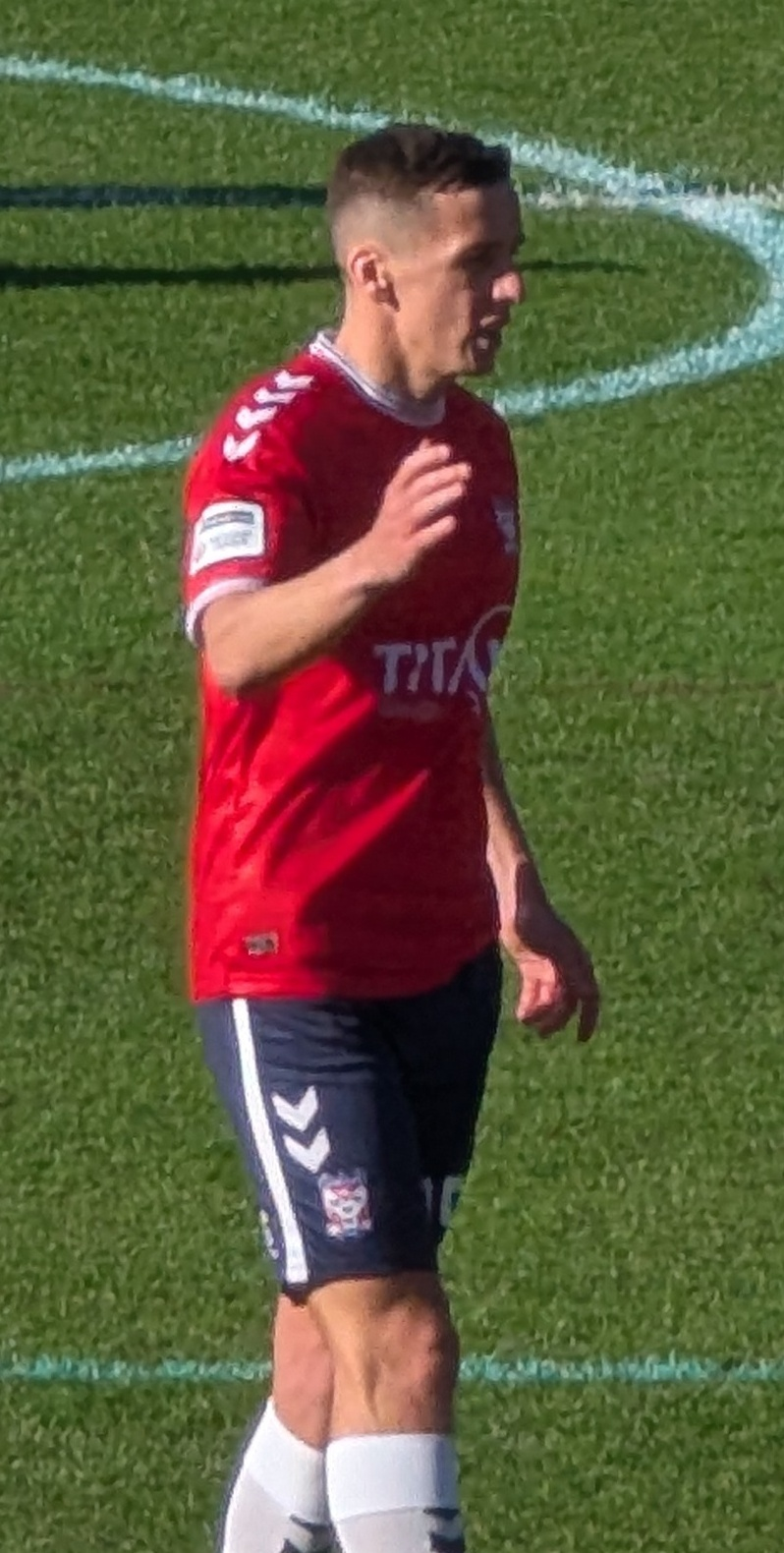
- King in 2026

Personal information
- Full name: Jeff Francis King
- Date of birth: 19 December 1995 (age 30)
- Place of birth: Liverpool, Merseyside, England
- Height: 5 ft 10 in (1.78 m)
- Position: Defender

Team information
- Current team: York City
- Number: 15

Youth career
- –2014: Altrincham

Senior career*
Years	Team	Apps	(Gls)
2014	Altrincham	0	(0)
2014	→ Prescot Cables (loan)		
2014	Nantwich Town	1	(0)
2014–2015	Kendal Town		
2015	Trafford		
2015–2016	Ashton United		
2016	Witton Albion	8	(2)
2016	Droylsden		
2016–2018	Bolton Wanderers	1	(0)
2018	→ FC United of Manchester (loan)	5	(4)
2018–2019	St Mirren	0	(0)
2019–2021	FC Halifax Town	67	(7)
2021–2024	Chesterfield	95	(12)
2024	Swindon Town	8	(0)
2024–	York City	37	(0)
2025–2026	→ Boreham Wood	22	(1)
- * Club domestic league appearances and goals as of 12 September 2026 (UTC)

Jeff Francis King (born 19 December 1995) is an English professional footballer who plays as a defender for EFL League Two club York City.

King started his career in non-league playing for Altrincham, Prescot Cables, Nantwich Town, Kendal Town, Trafford, Ashton United, Witton Albion and Droylsden, before joining the academy of Bolton Wanderers. He made his debut for Bolton in an EFL Cup match against West Ham United. King signed for Scottish Premiership club St Mirren in June 2018, but was released in the following January. On 13 November 2024, he mutually agreed to terminate his contract with Swindon, there becoming a free agent.

== Early life ==
King played for various Junior League sides in the Merseyside area; including The Mags, Warner Portcullis, The Celts and Connect.

== Career ==
=== Non-League ===
King played mostly for the youth team at Altrincham appearing regularly on the first team bench, but making his only first team appearance against Tranmere Rovers in the Cheshire Senior Cup. He had a brief loan spell at Prescot Cables from March 2014 until the end of the season, before returning to train with the Altrincham first team.

King moved to Nantwich Town in September 2014, whilst the club was in the midst of an injury crisis. He made his debut against Halesowen Town. In October 2014 he moved to Kendal Town. In January 2015, King moved to Trafford from Kendal Town, citing transportation difficulties.

In September 2015, King moved to Ashton United. In March 2016 he moved to Witton Albion. He played in the Mid-Cheshire Senior Cup final against 1874 Northwich which Witton lost 3–0. On 19 April 2016, King was charged by the FA with misconduct under Rule E3, allegedly using abusive, race-related language in a match played on 5 December 2015 whilst still at previous club Ashton United. He was subsequently suspended for five matches, fined £100 and ordered to complete an FA equality course.

In August 2016, King signed for Droylsden.

=== Bolton Wanderers ===
By November 2016, King was playing for Bolton's under-23 side. Bolton initially tried to register King's promotion to the first team in the 2016–17 season but due to a transfer embargo, the EFL prohibited the move. King extended his first professional contract with the club in July 2017. He joined the first team on a preseason trip to Scotland. Going into the season it seemed unlikely that King would receive any game time at Bolton, as the club were again restricted to a squad of only 23 professionals.

On 14 September 2017 the embargo was lifted and King was registered with the first team. He made his Bolton debut on 19 September 2017 in a loss against West Ham United in the third round of the EFL Cup, playing 80 minutes. He was released by Bolton at the end of the 2017–18 season.

=== St Mirren ===
On 22 June 2018, King signed a two-year contract with Scottish Premiership club St Mirren. He was released by St Mirren in January 2019.

=== Halifax Town ===
In August 2019, King signed for National League club FC Halifax Town. On 16 August 2020, King signed a new one-year deal for Halifax. King left the club at the end of the 2020–21 season following a season where he won his side's player of the season award as well as being named in the league's official Team of the Season.

=== Chesterfield ===
On 24 June 2021, King agreed a deal to join fellow National League side Chesterfield. King earned a place in the 2022–23 National League Team of the Year.

Following a title-winning campaign, King departed Chesterfield on a free transfer at the end of the 2023–24 season.

=== Swindon Town ===
On 5 August 2024, King joined League Two side Swindon Town following a spell with the club as a trialist.

=== York City ===
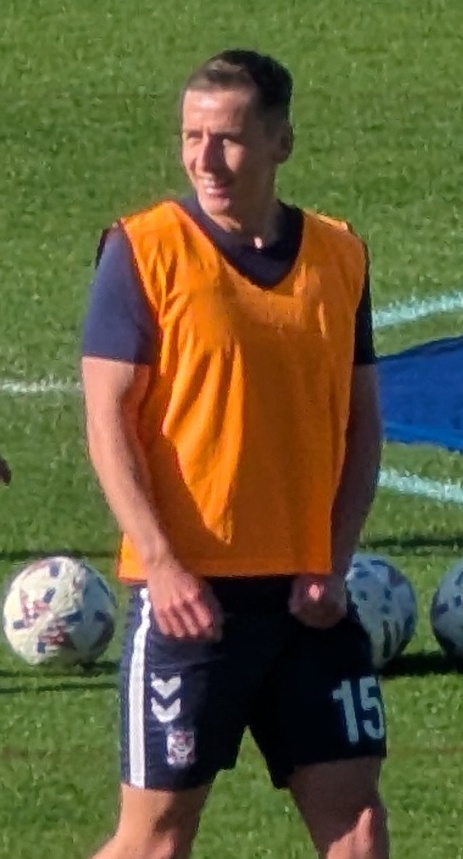
King warming up for York City in 2026

On 13 November 2024, King joined National League leaders York City on a free transfer.

On 3 July 2025, King joined newly promoted National League side Boreham Wood on loan until January 2026.

== Style of play ==
King was previously considered an attacking midfielder that can also cover the centre forward position, but since moving to Halifax he has been converted into a right wing back. He is known as a dead-ball specialist, with a large proportion of his goals occurring from set pieces.

== Personal life ==
He is the nephew of former Altrincham player and manager John King.

== Career statistics ==
As of match played 5 November 2024

Appearances and goals by club, season and competition
Club	Season	League			National cup		League cup		Other		Total	
Club	Season	Division	Apps	Goals	Apps	Goals	Apps	Goals	Apps	Goals	Apps	Goals
Altrincham	2013–14	Conference North	0	0	0	0	–		1 (Note: Appearance in Cheshire Senior Cup)	0	1	0
Nantwich Town	2014–15	NPL Premier Division	1	0	0	0	–		0	0	1	0
Witton Albion	2015–16	NPL Division One North	8	2	0	0	–		1 (Note: Appearance in Mid-Cheshire Senior Cup)	0	9	2
Bolton Wanderers	2017–18	Championship	1	0	0	0	1	0	0	0	2	0
St Mirren	2018–19	Scottish Premiership	0	0	0	0	3	0	0	0	3	0
FC Halifax Town	2019–20	National League	32	0	1	0	—		3 (Note: Two appearances in FA Trophy and one appearance in National League play-offs)	0	36	0
FC Halifax Town	2020–21	National League	35	7	1	0	—		2 (Note: Appearance(s) in FA Trophy)	0	38	7
FC Halifax Town	Total		67	7	2	0	—		5	0	74	7
Chesterfield	2021–22	National League	33	4	3	1	—		2 (Note: Appearance(s) in National League play-offs)	1	38	6
Chesterfield	2022–23	National League	39	7	5	1	—		2	0	46	8
Chesterfield	2023–24	National League	19	0	0	0	—		1	0	20	0
Chesterfield	Total		91	11	8	2	0	0	5	1	104	14
Swindon Town	2024–25	League Two	8	0	0	0	1	0	2 (Note: Appearance(s) in EFL Trophy)	0	11	0
Career total			176	20	10	2	5	0	14	1	205	23

== Honours ==
Chesterfield

- National League: 2023–24

York City

- National League: 2025–26

Individual

- National League Team of the Year: 2020–21, 2022–23
