= Mark Little (footballer) =

English footballer (born 1988)

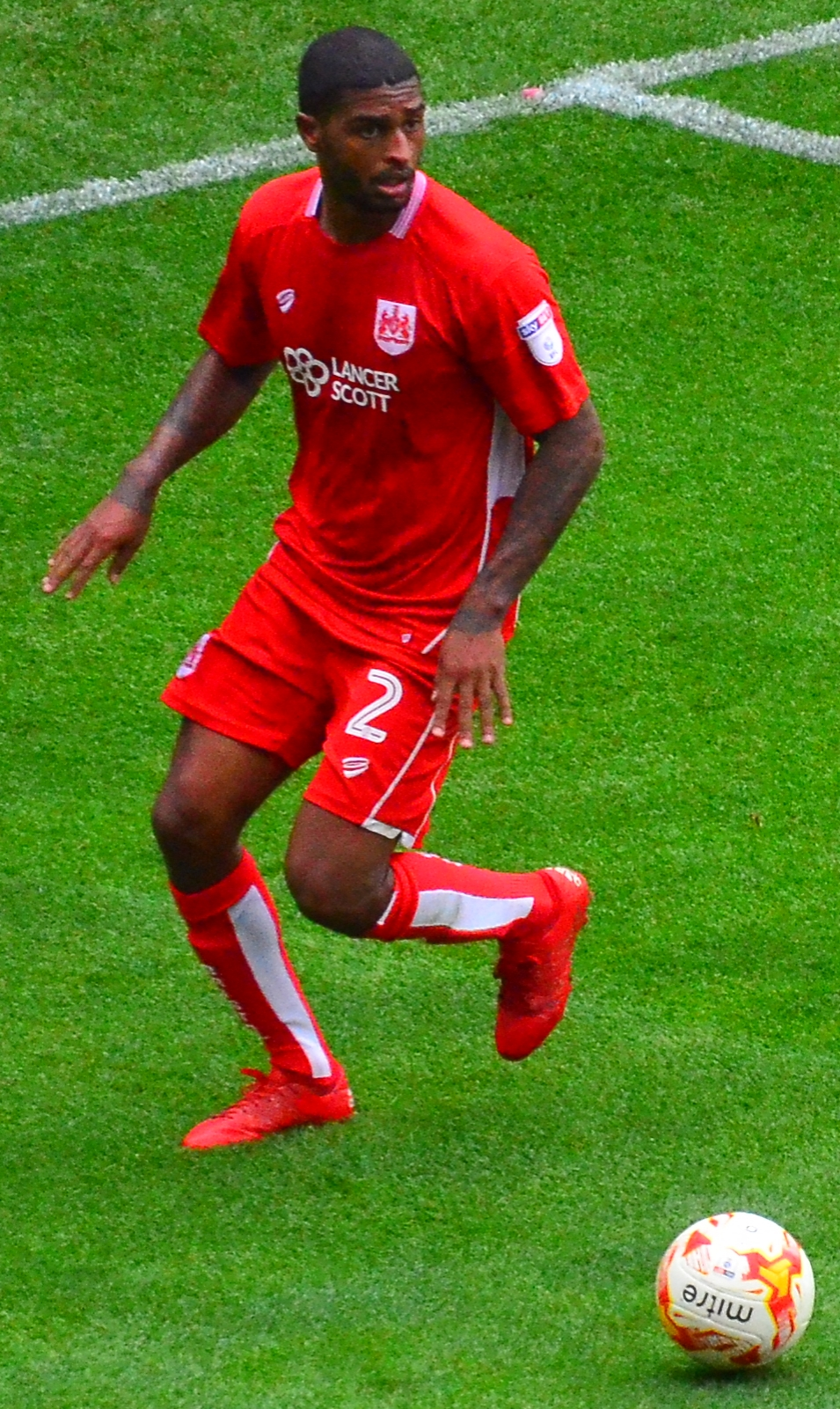

Personal information
- Full name: Mark Daniel Little
- Date of birth: 20 August 1988 (age 38)
- Place of birth: Worcester, England
- Height: 6 ft 2 in (1.87 m)
- Position: Right back

Youth career
- 2004–2005: Wolverhampton Wanderers

Senior career*
Years	Team	Apps	(Gls)
2005–2010	Wolverhampton Wanderers	27	(0)
2008	→ Northampton Town (loan)	17	(0)
2008	→ Northampton Town (loan)	9	(0)
2009–2010	→ Chesterfield (loan)	12	(0)
2010	→ Peterborough United (loan)	9	(0)
2010–2014	Peterborough United	148	(3)
2014–2017	Bristol City	88	(1)
2017–2019	Bolton Wanderers	30	(1)
2019–2021	Bristol Rovers	16	(0)
2021–2022	Yeovil Town	19	(0)
2022–2024	Penybont	53	(1)
2025–2026	Penybont	21	(0)
Total		449	(6)

International career
2006–2007	England U19	6	(0)
- * Club domestic league appearances and goals as of 16:52, 11 February 2026 (UTC)

Mark Daniel Little (born 20 August 1988) is a retired English former professional footballer who played as a defender.

== Career ==
=== Wolverhampton Wanderers ===
Born in Worcester and educated at Nunnery Wood High School, Little began his career as a youth player in Wolves' Academy and played a major role in the side who made it to the last four of the FA Youth Cup in 2005. He signed a three-year professional contract in August 2005 and had become a regular in the reserve side by the end of the 2005–06 season, and featured as an unused substitute for the first team throughout April 2006.

He made his first team debut in the League Cup at Chesterfield on 23 August 2006. This was followed by his league debut off the bench (on the opposite flank at left-back) at Leeds United on 10 September 2006.

Little went on to feature regularly throughout the season but didn't manage to continue this in the 2007–08 campaign. He was sent out on loan to League One side Northampton Town for a month in January 2008, later extended to three months. After beginning the following season with his parent club, but without breaking into the first team, he again returned to Sixfields on loan until the end of October. In late 2009, Little went out on loan again, this time for two months at League Two side Chesterfield.

=== Peterborough United ===
In March 2010 Little joined Championship strugglers Peterborough United on loan for the remainder of the season. After he was not offered a new contract at Wolves, Little signed for Peterborough in a three-year deal on 25 May 2010.

=== Bristol City ===
On 5 June 2014, Little left Peterborough after turning down a new contract offer. On 25 June 2014 it was confirmed Little would join Bristol City on a three-year contract from 1 July 2014. Little was part of the Bristol City squad that won League One (securing promotion to the Championship) and the Football League Trophy (meaning Little had been part of the winning side of the cup competition for two years running), scoring City's second goal and winning man of the match in the final of the latter. He was a regular starter in the Championship for Bristol City under Steve Cotterill and later, Lee Johnson.

=== Bolton Wanderers ===
His contract with Bristol City was not renewed after the 2016–17 season and he joined Bolton Wanderers.

=== Bristol Rovers ===
On 4 June 2019, Little joined Bristol Rovers on a free transfer. He scored his first goal for Rovers when he scored in an EFL Trophy tie against Swindon Town on 13 November 2019. In February 2021, Little spoke out about racial abuse that he had received in response to a post he made on Instagram, joining a host of footballers to have received racial abuse on social media in early 2021 as there were calls for social media companies to tackle abuse with real-life consequences. It was announced at the end of the 2020–21 season that Little's contract would not be renewed and he would be leaving the club.

=== Yeovil Town ===
On 25 June 2021, Little agreed a deal to join National League side Yeovil Town. At the end of the 2021–22 season, Little was released by Yeovil following the expiry of his contract.

=== Penybont ===
On 3 June 2022, Little joined Cymru Premier club Penybont following his release from Yeovil. He departed the club at the end of the 2023–24 season.

In January 2025, Little returned to Penybont. In February 2026, he departed the club to pursue a new career opportunity.

== Career statistics ==
Appearances and goals by club, season and competition
Club	Season	League			National Cup (Note: Includes FA Cup and Welsh Cup)		League Cup (Note: Includes League Cup)		Other		Total	
Club	Season	Division	Apps	Goals	Apps	Goals	Apps	Goals	Apps	Goals	Apps	Goals
Wolverhampton Wanderers	2006–07	Championship	26	0	3	0	1	0	1 (Note: Appearance in the Championship play-offs)	0	31	0
Wolverhampton Wanderers	2007–08	Championship	1	0	0	0	0	0	—		1	0
Wolverhampton Wanderers	2008–09	Championship	0	0	0	0	0	0	—		0	0
Wolverhampton Wanderers	2009–10	Premier League	0	0	0	0	0	0	—		0	0
Wolverhampton Wanderers	Total		27	0	3	0	1	0	1	0	32	0
Northampton Town (loan)	2007–08	League One	17	0	0	0	0	0	0	0	17	0
Northampton Town (loan)	2008–09	League One	9	0	0	0	2	0	1 (Note: Appearances in the Football League Trophy)	0	12	0
Northampton Town (loan)	Total		26	0	0	0	2	0	1	0	29	0
Chesterfield (loan)	2009–10	League Two	12	0	1	0	0	0	1	0	14	0
Peterborough United (loan)	2009–10	Championship	9	0	0	0	0	0	—		9	0
Peterborough United	2010–11	League One	35	0	4	0	1	0	4 (Note: One appearance in the Football League Trophy and three in the League One play-offs)	1	44	1
Peterborough United	2011–12	Championship	35	1	1	0	2	0	—		38	1
Peterborough United	2012–13	Championship	40	1	1	0	2	0	—		43	1
Peterborough United	2013–14	League One	38	1	4	0	2	0	7 (Note: Five appearances in the Football League Trophy and two in the League One play-offs)	0	51	1
Peterborough United	Total		157	3	10	0	7	0	11	1	185	4
Bristol City	2014–15	League One	37	1	3	0	0	0	3	1	43	2
Bristol City	2015–16	Championship	23	0	2	0	0	0	—		25	0
Bristol City	2016–17	Championship	28	0	2	0	4	0	—		34	0
Bristol City	Total		88	1	7	0	4	0	3	1	102	2
Bolton Wanderers	2017–18	Championship	28	1	1	0	2	0	—		31	1
Bolton Wanderers	2018–19	Championship	2	0	1	0	1	0	—		4	0
Bolton Wanderers	Total		30	1	2	0	3	0	—		35	1
Bristol Rovers	2019–20	League One	11	0	3	0	0	0	2	1	16	1
Bristol Rovers	2020–21	League One	5	0	0	0	1	0	1	0	7	0
Bristol Rovers	Total		16	0	3	0	1	0	3	1	23	1
Yeovil Town	2021–22	National League	19	0	0	0	—		1 (Note: Appearance in FA Trophy)	0	20	0
Penybont	2022–23	Cymru Premier	27	0	3	0	0	0	—		30	0
Penybont	2023–24	Cymru Premier	26	1	0	0	0	0	2 (Note: Appearances in UEFA Champions League)	0	28	1
Penybont	2024–25	Cymru Premier	9	0	0	0	0	0	0	0	9	0
Penybont	2025–26	Cymru Premier	12	0	1	0	2	0	2 (Note: Appearances in UEFA Europa Conference League)	0	17	0
Penybont	Total		74	1	4	0	2	0	4	0	84	1
Career total			449	6	30	0	20	0	25	3	524	9

== Honours ==
Peterborough United

- Football League One play-offs: 2011
- Football League Trophy: 2013–14

Bristol City

- Football League One: 2014–15
- Football League Trophy: 2014–15
