= Dorian Dervite =

French footballer (born 1988)

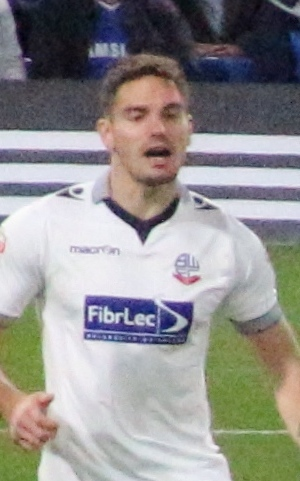
- Dervite playing for Bolton Wanderers, 2014

Personal information
- Full name: Dorian Pierre Dervite-Vaussoue
- Date of birth: 25 July 1988 (age 38)
- Place of birth: Lille, France
- Height: 1.91 m (6 ft 3 in)
- Position: Centre back

Youth career
- 1994–1999: La Madeleine
- 1999–2006: Lille
- 2006: Tottenham Hotspur

Senior career*
Years	Team	Apps	(Gls)
2006–2010	Tottenham Hotspur	0	(0)
2009	→ Southend United (loan)	18	(0)
2010–2012	Villarreal B	23	(0)
2012–2014	Charlton Athletic	70	(5)
2014–2018	Bolton Wanderers	87	(1)
2018–2019	Charleroi	1	(0)
2019	→ NAC Breda (loan)	5	(0)
2019–2020	Doxa Katokopias	20	(1)
2020	K.S.V. Roeselare	0	(0)
2020–	R.A.E.C. Mons		

International career
2009	France U21	8	(1)
- * Club domestic league appearances and goals as of 1 December 2019

Dorian Pierre Dervite-Vaussoue (born 25 July 1988), known as Dorian Dervite, is a French professional footballer who plays as a defender. He is also a former French youth International having played at every youth level from U16 to U21 level.

== Club career ==
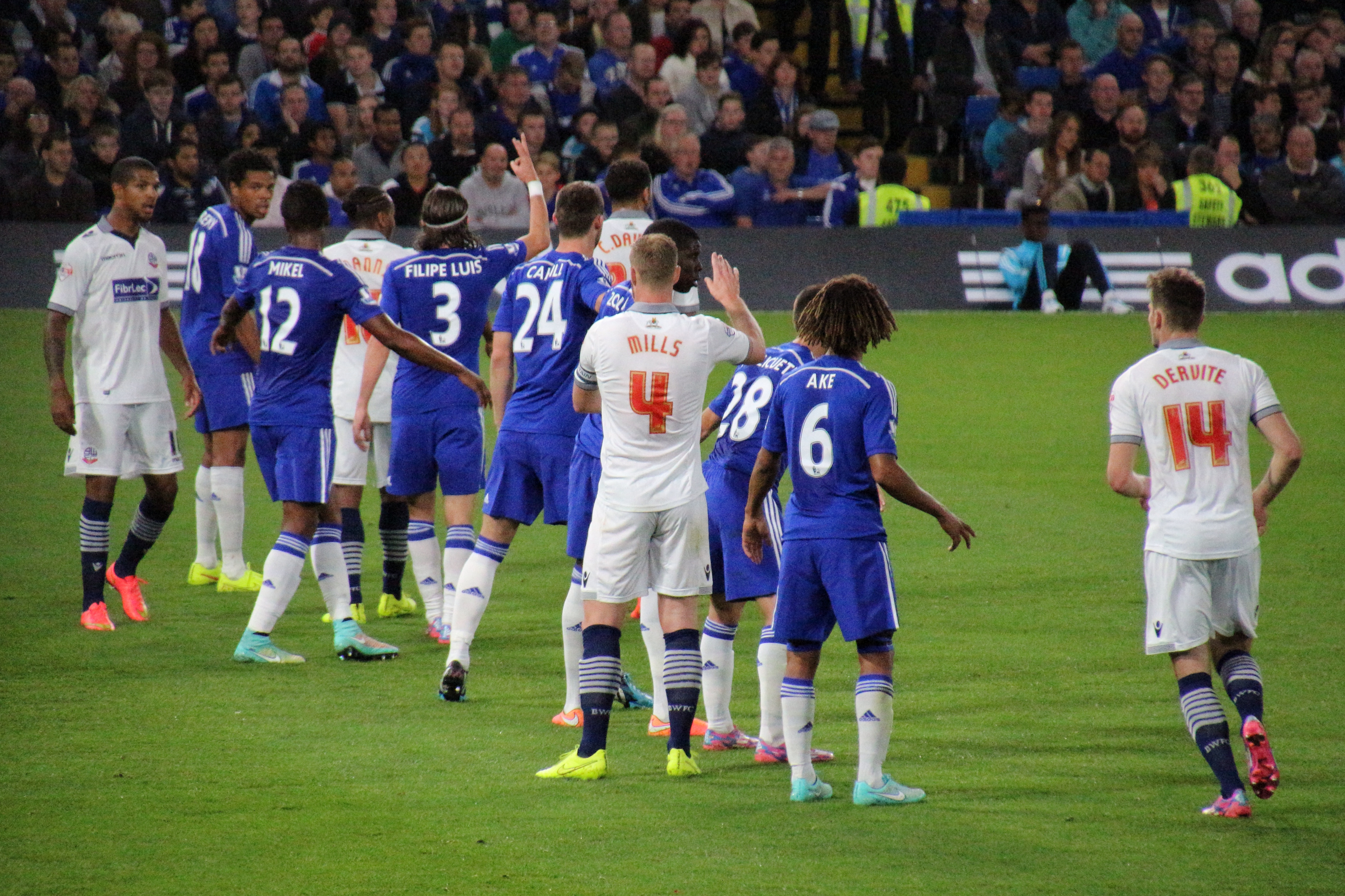
Dervite (wearing No.14) playing for Bolton in the League Cup against Chelsea

Dervite started his career with French club Lille but in July 2006 he moved to England to join and train in the Tottenham Hotspur youth academy. He made his competitive debut for Tottenham in the 3–1 win over Port Vale in the League Cup 4th round on 8 November 2006 where he partnered Michael Dawson in the centre of the Spurs defence.

Dervite suffered a knee injury while playing for the Spurs reserve side during a friendly match against Norwich City in early January 2007, which kept him out for several months. In January 2009, he joined Southend United on loan until the end of the season. Dervite came second in Southend's player of the season vote after a very successful loan.

He then signed for Villarreal B where he played 23 league matches, making his debut against Las Palmas. Dervite left Villarreal B to sign for English Championship side Charlton Athletic. Dervite scored his first Charlton goal in a 1–1 draw away at Leeds United. On 17 May 2013, Dervite signed a one-year contract extension. On 27 May 2014, Dervite signed for Bolton Wanderers, on a three-year contract

On 5 December 2015, he scored his first Bolton goal on his 50th league appearance for the club in a 2–3 defeat against Cardiff City at the Macron Stadium. On 9 June 2017, the club confirmed that Dervite had signed a new one-year contract with the option of an extension. On 24 May 2018, Bolton confirmed that Dervite would leave the club on 30 June when his contract came to an end.

On 23 July 2018, he signed a two-year contract with Belgian side Charleroi, with the option of a further year. In January 2019, he was loaned to NAC Breda until the end of the season.

== International career ==
Dervite has represented France at U-15, U-16, U-17, U-18, U-19 and U-21 levels. He has captained them on occasions. He was called up to the Under-21 squad to face Estonia and England. He was called for the international Toulon Tournament again with the U21, then against Poland and for the U21 European Championship qualifiers against Lithuania and Ukraine. he scored his first goal for France in a home draw with Poland U21 on 12 August 2009 with an 80th minute shot to make it 2–1 to France with the game ending 2–2, his last game for the Under-21s came in their 3–1 away win over Slovenia U21 on 5 September 2009.

== Career statistics ==
As of 22 July 2017

Club	Season	League			National Cup		League Cup		Other		Total	
Club	Season	Division	Apps	Goals	Apps	Goals	Apps	Goals	Apps	Goals	Apps	Goals
Tottenham Hotspur	2006–07	Premier League	0	0	0	0	1	0	0	0	1	0
Tottenham Hotspur	2007–08	Premier League	0	0	0	0	0	0	0	0	0	0
Tottenham Hotspur	2008–09	Premier League	0	0	0	0	0	0	0	0	0	0
Tottenham Hotspur	2009–10	Premier League	0	0	0	0	0	0	—		0	0
Tottenham Hotspur	Spurs total		0	0	0	0	1	0	0	0	1	0
Southend United (loan)	2008–09	League One	18	0	0	0	0	0	0	0	18	0
Villarreal B	2010–11	Segunda División	16	0	—		—		—		16	0
Villarreal B	2011–12	Segunda División	6	0	—		—		—		6	0
Villarreal B	Villarreal B total		22	0	—		—		—		22	0
Charlton Athletic	2012–13	Championship	30	3	1	0	0	0	—		31	3
Charlton Athletic	2013–14	Championship	40	2	3	0	1	0	—		44	2
Charlton Athletic	Charlton total		70	5	4	0	1	0	—		75	5
Bolton Wanderers	2014–15	Championship	37	0	3	0	3	0	—		43	0
Bolton Wanderers	2015–16	Championship	22	1	3	0	1	0	—		26	1
Bolton Wanderers	2016–17	League One	14	0	0	0	0	0	0	0	14	0
Bolton Wanderers	2017–18	Championship	14	0	0	0	2	1	0	0	16	1
Bolton total			87	1	6	0	6	1	0	0	99	2
Career total			197	6	10	0	8	1	0	0	215	7

== Honours ==
Bolton Wanderers

- EFL League One runner-up: 2016–17
