= 2017–18 Northampton Town F.C. season =

Northampton Town F.C.
2017–18 season
- Chairman: Kelvin Thomas
- Manager: Justin Edinburgh (until 31 August); Jimmy Floyd Hasselbaink (from 4 September to 3 April)
- Stadium: Sixfields Stadium
- League One: 22nd
- FA Cup: First round
- EFL Cup: First round
- EFL Trophy: Second round
- Top goalscorer: League: Chris Long (9); All: Chris Long (9)
- Highest home attendance: 7,231 vs MK Dons
- Lowest home attendance: 1,118 vs Southampton U21s
- Average home league attendance: 5,830
Home colours	Away colours	Third colours

The 2017–18 season was Northampton Town's 121st season in their history and the second successive season in League One. Alongside competing in League One, the club also participated in the FA Cup, EFL Cup and EFL Trophy.

== Players ==
As of match played 6 May 2018.

No.	Name	Position	Nat.	Place of birth	Date of birth (age)	Apps	Goals	Previous club	Date signed	Fee
Goalkeepers
1	David Cornell	GK	(Wales)	Waunarlwydd	28 March 1991 (aged 27)	22	0	Oldham Athletic	21 June 2016	Free
13	Richard O'Donnell	GK	(England)	Sheffield	12 September 1988 (aged 29)	19	0	Rotherham United	9 January 2018	Add-ons
25	James Goff	GK	(England)	Northampton	28 March 1999 (aged 19)	0	0	Academy	30 April 2017	N/A
Defenders
2	Brendan Moloney	RB	(Republic of Ireland)	Beaufort	18 January 1989 (aged 29)	115	2	Yeovil Town	2 January 2015	Free
3	David Buchanan (c)	LB	(Northern Ireland)	Rochdale (ENG)	6 May 1986 (aged 32)	143	1	Preston North End	28 May 2015	Free
5	Leon Barnett	CB	(England)	Stevenage	30 November 1985 (aged 32)	18	1	Bury	31 May 2017	Free
6	Ash Taylor	CB	(Wales)	Bromborough (ENG)	2 September 1990 (aged 27)	52	7	Aberdeen	5 July 2017	Free
16	Aaron Pierre	CB	(Grenada)	Southall (ENG)	17 February 1993 (aged 25)	23	0	Wycombe Wanderers	21 July 2017	Free
18	Aaron Phillips	RB	(England)	Warwick	20 November 1993 (aged 24)	27	1	Coventry City	3 June 2016	Free
24	Shay Facey	RB	(England)	Stockport	7 January 1995 (aged 23)	15	1	Manchester City	5 January 2018	Undisclosed
26	Regan Poole	CB	(Wales)	Cardiff	18 June 1998 (aged 19)	24	0	Manchester United	7 July 2017	Loan
27	Raheem Hanley	LB	(England)	Blackburn	24 March 1994 (aged 24)	9	0	Swansea City	14 June 2016	Free
37	Jordan Turnbull	CB	(England)	Trowbridge	30 October 1994 (aged 23)	14	0	Coventry City	11 January 2018	Add-ons
39	Joe Bunney	LB	(England)	Gorton	26 September 1993 (aged 24)	12	0	Rochdale	16 January 2018	Undisclosed
Midfielders
4	Yaser Kasim	CM	(Iraq)	Karrada	10 May 1991 (aged 26)	10	0	Swindon Town	4 July 2017	Free
8	Sam Foley	CM	(Republic of Ireland)	St Albans (ENG)	17 October 1986 (aged 31)	27	3	Port Vale	22 May 2017	Free
11	Daniel Powell	W	(England)	Luton	12 March 1991 (aged 27)	32	2	Milton Keynes Dons	5 May 2017	Free
14	Sam Hoskins	AM	(England)	Dorchester	4 February 1993 (aged 25)	102	13	Yeovil Town	1 August 2015	Free
17	Shaun McWilliams	CM	(England)	Northampton	14 August 1998 (aged 19)	27	0	Academy	30 April 2016	N/A
21	John-Joe O'Toole	CM	(Republic of Ireland)	Harrow (ENG)	30 September 1988 (aged 29)	160	32	Bristol Rovers	30 June 2014	Free
22	Matt Crooks	CM	(England)	Leeds	20 January 1994 (aged 24)	34	4	Rangers	18 July 2017	£100,000
29	Matt Grimes	CM	(England)	Exeter	15 June 1995 (aged 22)	47	4	Swansea City	16 August 2017	Loan
36	Jack Bridge	AM	(England)	Southend	21 September 1995 (aged 22)	4	0	Southend United	5 January 2018	Free
Forwards
10	Kevin van Veen	CF	(Netherlands)	Eindhoven	1 June 1991 (aged 26)	10	0	Scunthorpe United	30 January 2018	Undisclosed
12	Leon Lobjoit	CF	(England)	Hatfield	4 January 1995 (aged 23)	1	0	Buckingham Town	30 March 2017	N/A
19	Chris Long	CF	(England)	Huyton	25 February 1995 (aged 23)	42	9	Burnley	28 July 2017	Loan
42	Kevin Luckassen	CF	(Netherlands)	Eindhoven	27 July 1993 (aged 24)	4	1	SKN St. Pölten	9 March 2018	Free

== Pre-season ==
As of 26 June 2017, Northampton Town have announced six pre-season friendlies, against Derby County, Frome Town, Northampton Sileby Rangers, Kettering Town, Birmingham City 'Dev' and Newport County.

8 July 2017	Northampton Sileby Rangers	2–8	Northampton Town	Northampton
15:00 BST	E.Appleton 74'; N.Ansu 84'	Report	L.Barnett 24'; M.Richards 33'; S.Foley 56', 73'; J.Iaciofano 59', 65', 88'; D.Powell 77'	Stadium: Fernie Fields; Referee: Andy Woolmer

14 July 2017	Northampton Town	4–1	Birmingham City XI	Alicante, Spain
18:30 CEST	A.Revell 7'; B.Waters 55'; M.Richards 77'; D.Bowditch 89'	Report	22'	Stadium: Oliva Nova Complex

18 July 2017	Frome Town	0–4	Northampton Town	Frome
19:30 BST		Report	M.Richards 21'; D.Powell 61'; A.Revell 80'; D.Bowditch 90'	Stadium: Special Effect Stadium; Attendance: 305; Referee: Kevin Johnson

19 July 2017	AFC Rushden & Diamonds	2–0	Northampton Town	Rushden
19:30 BST	B.Farrell 28'; T.Lorraine 80'	Report		Stadium: Hayden Road

22 July 2017	Kettering Town	1–1	Northampton Town	Wellingborough
15:00 BST	M.Richens 65'	Report	D.Bowditch 19'	Stadium: Dog & Duck; Referee: Ian Rathbone

25 July 2017	Northampton Town	1–0	Derby County	Northampton
19:45 BST	M.Richards 18'	Report		Stadium: Sixfields Stadium; Attendance: 2,855; Referee: Andy Woolmer

29 July 2017	Northampton Town	2–1	Newport County	Northampton
15:00 BST	C.Long 70'; L.Barnett 83'	Report	L.Reynolds 67'	Stadium: Sixfields Stadium; Attendance: 1,346; Referee: Darren England

== Competitions ==
=== EFL League One ===
==== League table ====
Pos	Team	Pld	W	D	L	GF	GA	GD	Pts	Promotion, qualification or relegation
20	Rochdale	46	11	18	17	49	57	−8	51	
21	Oldham Athletic (R)	46	11	17	18	58	75	−17	50	Relegation to EFL League Two
22	Northampton Town (R)	46	12	11	23	43	77	−34	47	Relegation to EFL League Two
23	Milton Keynes Dons (R)	46	11	12	23	43	69	−26	45	Relegation to EFL League Two
24	Bury (R)	46	8	12	26	41	71	−30	36	Relegation to EFL League Two

Source: BBC Sport
Rules for classification: 1) Points; 2) Goal difference; 3) Number of goals scored
(R) Relegated

==== League position by match ====
Round	1	2	3	4	5	6	7	8	9	10	11	12	13	14	15	16	17	18	19	20	21	22	23	24	25	26	27	28	29	30	31	32	33	34	35	36	37	38	39	40	41	42	43	44	45	46
Ground	A	H	A	H	H	H	A	A	H	A	A	H	H	A	A	H	A	H	A	H	A	H	H	A	A	H	H	A	H	A	H	A	H	A	H	A	H	H	A	H	A	A	A	H	A	H
Result	L	L	L	L	W	W	D	L	L	D	L	L	L	D	W	W	W	L	L	D	L	W	D	L	L	L	W	W	W	D	L	W	L	D	D	D	L	D	L	L	L	L	W	W	L	D
Position	20	21	23	24	22	17	17	18	20	21	22	22	23	23	22	21	19	21	21	22	23	20	22	22	22	22	22	21	18	20	20	18	20	19	19	20	21	21	21	22	22	23	22	22	22	22

Updated to match(es) played on 9 December 2017. Source: BBC Sport
A = Away; H = Home; W = Win; D = Draw; L = Loss

==== Matches ====
Win Draw Loss

On 21 June 2017, the league fixtures were announced.

5 August 2017 1	Shrewsbury Town	1–0	Northampton Town	Shrewsbury
15:00 BST	L.John–Lewis 90+2'	Report		Stadium: Greenhous Meadow; Attendance: 5,763 (1,053); Referee: Seb Stockbridge

12 August 2017 2	Northampton Town	0–1	Fleetwood Town	Northampton
15:00 BST		Report	D.Cole 75'	Stadium: Sixfields Stadium; Attendance: 5,124 (103); Referee: Brett Huxtable

19 August 2017 3	Charlton Athletic	4–1	Northampton Town	Charlton
15:00 BST	J.Magennis 2'; R.Holmes 61'; J.Forster-Caskey 90+4', 90+7'	Report	M.Richards 79'	Stadium: The Valley; Attendance: 11,289 (881); Referee: Kevin Johnson

26 August 2017 4	Northampton Town	1–4	Peterborough United	Northampton
15:00 BST	A.Revell 85'	Report	G.Edwards 32'; J.Morias 41'; J.Marriott 75'; M.Maddison 90+2' (pen.)	Stadium: Sixfields Stadium; Attendance: 6,685 (1,407); Referee: Roger East

9 September 2017 5	Northampton Town	1–0	Doncaster Rovers	Northampton
15:00 BST	M.Crooks 1'	Report		Stadium: Sixfields Stadium; Attendance: 5,843 (736); Referee: Darren Handley

12 September 2017 6	Northampton Town	3–1	Portsmouth	Northampton
19:45 BST	C.Long 18', 70'; M.Crooks 35'	Report	M.Kennedy 49'	Stadium: Sixfields Stadium; Attendance: 5,855 (1,153); Referee: Darren Drysdale

16 September 2017 7	Southend United	2–2	Northampton Town	Southend
15:00 BST	J.Demetriou 48'; A.Wordsworth 50'	Report	L.Barnett 20'; M.Crooks 43' (red card)	Stadium: Roots Hall; Attendance: 6,532 (428); Referee: Nicholas Kinseley

19 September 2017 8	Wigan Athletic	1–0	Northampton Town	Wigan
19:45 BST	M.Jacobs 56'	Report		Stadium: DW Stadium; Attendance: 7,777 (292); Referee: Anthony Backhouse

23 September 2017 9	Northampton Town	0–1	Bradford City	Northampton
15:00 BST		Report	T.McMahon 34'	Stadium: Sixfields Stadium; Attendance: 6,355 (1,145); Referee: Graham Horwood

26 September 2017 10	Milton Keynes Dons	0–0	Northampton Town	Bletchley
19:45 BST		Report		Stadium: Stadium MK; Attendance: 11,340 (2,566); Referee: Chris Sarginson

30 September 2017 11	Rotherham United	1–0	Northampton Town	Rotherham
15:00 BST	K.Moore 52'	Report		Stadium: New York Stadium; Attendance: 8,073 (566); Referee: Trevor Kettle

7 October 2017 12	Northampton Town	0–6	Bristol Rovers	Northampton
15:00 BST	A.Revell (red card) 69'	Report	B.Bodin 37'; E.Harrison 56', 61'; R.Gaffney 72'; L.Sercombe 76'; D.Telford 86'	Stadium: Sixfields Stadium; Attendance: 6,087 (1,007); Referee: Mark Heywood

14 October 2017 13	Northampton Town	0–1	AFC Wimbledon	Northampton
15:00 BST		Report	H.Forrester 61'	Stadium: Sixfields Stadium; Attendance: 5,306 (501); Referee: Graham Salisbury

17 October 2017 14	Rochdale	2–2	Northampton Town	Rochdale
19:45 BST	I.Henderson 25', 62'	Report	A.Taylor 71'; D.Buchanan 78'	Stadium: Spotland; Attendance: 2,138; Referee: Darren Drysdale

21 October 2017 15	Gillingham	1–2	Northampton Town	Gillingham
15:00 BST	L.Martin 62'	Report	D.Powell 45'; M.Grimes 73'	Stadium: Priestfield Stadium; Attendance: 4,640 (293); Referee: Ross Joyce

28 October 2017 16	Northampton Town	1–0	Blackpool	Northampton
14:00 BST	S.Hoskins 21'	Report		Stadium: Sixfields Stadium; Attendance: 5,213; Referee: John Busby

11 November 2017 17	Oxford United	1–2	Northampton Town	Oxford
15:00 GMT	W.Thomas 44'	Report	A.Taylor 11'; C.Long 45+1'	Stadium: Kassam Stadium; Attendance: 8,267 (1,125); Referee: Kevin Johnson

18 November 2017 18	Northampton Town	0–3	Scunthorpe United	Northampton
15:00 GMT		Report	C.Burgess 56'; D.Holmes 58', 74'	Stadium: Sixfields Stadium; Attendance: 5,181 (306); Referee: Michael Salisbury

21 November 2017 19	Plymouth Argyle	2–0	Northampton Town	Plymouth
19:45 GMT	S.Bradley 30', 52'	Report		Stadium: Home Park; Attendance: 7,610; Referee: Antony Coggins

25 November 2017 20	Northampton Town	0–0	Bury	Northampton
15:00 GMT		Report		Stadium: Sixfields Stadium; Attendance: 4,870 (230); Referee: Carl Boyeson

9 December 2017 21	Oldham Athletic	5–1	Northampton Town	Oldham
15:00 GMT	J.Byrne 4', 45+2'; T.Obadeyi 26'; G.Nepomuceno 60'; C.Davies 90+3'	Report	S.Foley 47'	Stadium: Boundary Park; Attendance: 3,532 (332); Referee: Graham Salisbury

16 December 2017 22	Northampton Town	2–1	Walsall	Northampton
15:00 GMT	C.Long 4', 41'; M.Crooks (red card)	Report	E.Oztumer 2'; A.Bakayoko (red card) 69'	Stadium: Sixfields Stadium; Attendance: 5,055 (394); Referee: Charles Breakspear

23 December 2017 23	Northampton Town	1–1	Blackburn Rovers	Northampton
14:00 GMT	S.Foley 21'	Report	B.Dack 48'	Stadium: Sixfields Stadium; Attendance: 6,541 (1,445); Referee: Gavin Ward

26 December 2017 24	Doncaster Rovers	3–0	Northampton Town	Doncaster
15:00 GMT	J.Coppinger 33'; N.Mason 43' (pen.); A.Butler 66'	Report		Stadium: Keepmoat Stadium; Attendance: 8,032 (495); Referee: Ben Toner

30 December 2017 25	Portsmouth	3–1	Northampton Town	Portsmouth
15:00 GMT	M.Kennedy 41'; O.Hawkins 45', 48'	Report	C.Long 36'	Stadium: Fratton Park; Attendance: 18,539 (538); Referee: Lee Swabey

1 January 2018 26	Northampton Town	0–1	Wigan Athletic	Northampton
15:00 GMT		Report	N.Powell 5'	Stadium: Sixfields Stadium; Attendance: 5,328 (511); Referee: Mark Heywood

6 January 2018 27	Northampton Town	3–1	Southend United	Northampton
14:00 GMT	JJ.O'Toole 19'; M.Grimes 49' (pen.); A.Revell 90'	Report	J.Demetriou 26' (pen.)	Stadium: Sixfields Stadium; Attendance: 5,267 (564); Referee: Michael Salisbury

13 January 2018 28	Bradford City	1–2	Northampton Town	Bradford
15:00 GMT	P.Taylor 90+2'	Report	JJ.O'Toole 43'; C.Long 62'	Stadium: Valley Parade; Attendance: 19,343; Referee: Craig Hicks

20 January 2018 29	Northampton Town	2–1	Milton Keynes Dons	Northampton
15:00 GMT	JJ.O'Toole 16'; C.Long 41'	Report	A.Gilbey 19'; C.Aneke (red card) 90+4'	Stadium: Sixfields Stadium; Attendance: 7,231 (1,210); Referee: Brett Huxtable

27 January 2018 30	Blackburn Rovers	1–1	Northampton Town	Blackburn
15:00 GMT	D.Graham 74'	Report	JJ.O'Toole 12'	Stadium: Ewood Park; Attendance: 12,555 (943); Referee: Anthony Backhouse

3 February 2018 31	Northampton Town	0–1	Rochdale	Northampton
15:00 GMT		Report	C.Andrew 53'	Stadium: Sixfields Stadium; Attendance: 5,475 (214); Referee: John Busby

10 February 2018 32	AFC Wimbledon	1–3	Northampton Town	Kingston upon Thames
15:00 GMT	D.Oshilaja 47'	Report	M.Grimes 8' (pen.); M.Crooks 62'; D.Powell 72'	Stadium: Kingsmeadow; Attendance: 4,485 (741); Referee: Carl Boyeson

13 February 2018 33	Northampton Town	1–2	Gillingham	Northampton
19:45 GMT	A.Taylor 56'	Report	J.Parker 6'; T.Eaves 18'	Stadium: Sixfields Stadium; Attendance: 5,123; Referee: Charles Breakspear

17 February 2018 34	Scunthorpe United	2–2	Northampton Town	Scunthorpe
15:00 GMT	F.Ojo 31'; M.Wallace 77'	Report	C.Long 13'; JJ.O'Toole 57'	Stadium: Glanford Park; Attendance: 4,157; Referee: Andrew Madley

24 February 2018 35	Northampton Town	0–0	Oxford United	Northampton
15:00 GMT		Report		Stadium: Sixfields Stadium; Attendance: 7,095 (1,444); Referee: Martin Coy

10 March 2018 36	Bristol Rovers	1–1	Northampton Town	Bristol
15:00 GMT	K.Bennett 34'	Report	K.Luckassen 62'; Crooks (red card)	Stadium: Memorial Stadium; Attendance: 9,054; Referee: Eddie Ilderton

17 March 2018 37	Northampton Town	0–3	Rotherham United	Northampton
15:00 GMT		Report	M.Smith 17'; D.Ball 62'; R.Towell 81'	Stadium: Sixfields Stadium; Attendance: 5,882; Referee: Ben Toner

20 March 2018 38	Northampton Town	1–1	Shrewsbury Town	Northampton
19:45 GMT	S.Facey 45'; JJ.O'Toole (red card) 64'	Report	A.Ogogo (red card) 65'; J.Nolan 67'	Stadium: Sixfields Stadium; Attendance: 4,788; Referee: Andy Davies

24 March 2018 39	Fleetwood Town	2–0	Northampton Town	Fleetwood
15:00 GMT	K.Dempsey 18'; C.Bolger 83'	Report		Stadium: Highbury Stadium; Attendance: 3,049; Referee: Robert Lewis

30 March 2018 40	Northampton Town	0–4	Charlton Athletic	Northampton
15:00 BST		Report	B.Reeves 14'; T.Fosu 19', 51'; J.Magennis 79'	Stadium: Sixfields Stadium; Attendance: 6,416; Referee: Gavin Ward

2 April 2018 41	Peterborough United	2–0	Northampton Town	Peterborough
15:00 BST	J.Baldwin 12'; J.Marriott 14'	Report	A.Taylor (red card) 79'	Stadium: London Road; Attendance: 8,619; Referee: Michael Salisbury

10 April 2018 42	Blackpool	3–0	Northampton Town	Blackpool
19:45 BST	A.Gnanduillet 42'; S.Longstaff 62'; J.Ryan 74'	Report		Stadium: Bloomfield Road; Attendance: 2,964; Referee: Chris Sarginson

14 April 2018 43	Bury	2–3	Northampton Town	Bury
15:00 BST	P.Clarke 11'; D.Mayor 74'	Report	A.Taylor 6', 88'; S.Hoskins 33'	Stadium: Gigg Lane; Attendance: 3,117; Referee: Trevor Kettle

21 April 2018 44	Northampton Town	2–0	Plymouth Argyle	Northampton
15:00 BST	JJ.O'Toole 42'; Z.Vyner 61' (o.g.)	Report		Stadium: Sixfields Stadium; Attendance: 6,868 (1,452); Referee: Lee Collins

28 April 2018 45	Walsall	1–0	Northampton Town	Walsall
15:00 BST	G.Dobson 90+1'	Report		Stadium: Bescot Stadium; Attendance: 8,919; Referee: Seb Stockbridge

6 May 2018 46	Northampton Town	2–2	Oldham Athletic	Northampton
15:00 BST	M.Grimes 42' (pen.); A.Taylor 45+4'	Report	G.Edmundson 29'; T.Haymer 55'	Stadium: Sixfields Stadium; Attendance: 6,511; Referee: Keith Stroud

=== FA Cup ===
On 16 October 2017, the first round draw was made with Northampton Town drawn at home against Scunthorpe United. A 0–0 draw meant a replay had to be played at Glanford Park.

4 November 2017 First round	Northampton Town	0–0	Scunthorpe United	Northampton
15:00 GMT		Report		Stadium: Sixfields Stadium; Attendance: 2,820 (277); Referee: Robert Jones

14 November 2017 First round (r)	Scunthorpe United	1–0	Northampton Town	Scunthorpe
19:45 GMT	H.Adelakun 32'	Report		Stadium: Glanford Park; Attendance: 1,880; Referee: Andy Haines

=== EFL Cup ===
On 16 June 2017, the first round draw was made with Northampton Town drawn away against QPR.

8 August 2017 First round	Queens Park Rangers	1–0	Northampton Town	Shepherd's Bush
19:45 BST	Y.N'Gbakoto 36'	Report	L.Barnett (red card) 53'	Stadium: Loftus Road; Attendance: 4,317 (735); Referee: Charles Breakspear

=== EFL Trophy ===
On 12 July 2017, the group stage draw was made with Northampton Town drawn in a group with Southampton U23s, Cambridge United and Peterborough United. After finished as runners-up in the group stages, Northampton were drawn away to Portsmouth in the second round.

Pos	Lge	Team	Pld	W	PW	PL	L	GF	GA	GD	Pts	Qualification
1	L1	Peterborough United (Q)	3	2	0	1	0	5	1	+4	7	Round 2
2	L1	Northampton Town (Q)	3	0	3	0	0	5	5	0	6	Round 2
3	ACA	Southampton U21 (E)	3	1	0	1	1	4	5	−1	4	
4	L2	Cambridge United (E)	3	0	0	1	2	1	4	−3	1	

Updated to match(es) played on 7 November 2017. Source: EFL.com
(E) Eliminated; (Q) Qualified to the phase indicated

29 August 2017 Group stage	Northampton Town	1–1 (5–4 p)	Cambridge United	Northampton
19:45 BST	A.Revell 29'	Report	P.Mingoia 27'	Stadium: Sixfields Stadium; Attendance: 1,453 (143); Referee: John Brooks
	Penalties
	A.Revell (penalty scored); J.Iaciofano (penalty scored); B.Waters (penalty scored); S.McWilliams (penalty scored); A.Taylor (penalty scored)		M.Elito (penalty scored); P.Mingoia (penalty scored); J.Brown (penalty scored); L.O'Neil (penalty missed); A.Azeez (penalty scored)

3 October 2017 Group stage	Peterborough United	1–1 (2–4 p)	Northampton Town	Peterborough
19:45 BST	D.Lloyd 43'	Report	J.Baldwin 79' (o.g.)	Stadium: London Road; Attendance: 2,745 (151); Referee: Gavin Ward
	Penalties
	J.Marriott (penalty missed); M.Doherty (penalty scored); L.Lopes (penalty scored); A.Hughes (penalty missed)		M.Grimes (penalty scored); A.Revell (penalty scored); M.Richards (penalty scored); B.Waters (penalty scored)

7 November 2017 Group stage	Northampton Town	3–3 (4–2 p)	Southampton U23s	Northampton
19:45 GMT	S.Foley 72'; L.McGugan 83'; A.Taylor 90+5'	Report	J.Hesketh 6', 51'; T.Johnson 59'	Stadium: Sixfields Stadium; Attendance: 1,118 (53); Referee: Brett Huxtable
	Penalties
	M.Grimes (penalty scored); M.Richards (penalty scored); C.Long (penalty scored); R.McGivern (penalty missed); L.McGugan (penalty scored)		A.Little (penalty scored); T.Johnson (penalty missed); J.Afolabi (penalty scored); O.Cook (penalty missed)

2 December 2017 Second round	Portsmouth	2–0	Northampton Town	Milton
12:30 GMT	G.Evans 41'; S.O'Keefe 58'	Report		Stadium: Fratton Park; Attendance: 1,780; Referee: Tom Nield

=== Appearances, goals and cards ===
No.	Pos	Player	League One			FA Cup			EFL Cup			EFL Trophy			Total			Discipline	
No.	Pos	Player	Starts	Sub	Goals	Starts	Sub	Goals	Starts	Sub	Goals	Starts	Sub	Goals	Starts	Sub	Goals	Yellow card	Red card
1	GK	David Cornell	6	–	–	2	–	–	1	–	–	3	–	–	12	–	–	–	–
2	RB	Brendan Moloney	31	3	–	–	–	–	–	–	–	4	–	–	38	3	–	4	–
3	LB	David Buchanan	32	–	1	1	–	–	1	–	–	2	–	–	36	–	1	3	–
4	CM	Yaser Kasim	4	2	–	1	–	–	1	–	–	2	–	–	8	2	–	–	–
5	CB	Leon Barnett	13	2	1	–	–	–	1	–	–	2	–	–	15	2	1	2	1
6	CB	Ash Taylor	45	–	6	2	–	–	1	–	–	4	–	1	52	–	7	2	1
8	CM	Sam Foley	15	8	2	1	–	–	–	–	–	2	1	1	18	9	3	3	–
10	ST	Kevin van Veen	6	4	–	–	–	–	–	–	–	–	–	–	6	4	–	2	–
11	W	Daniel Powell	21	8	2	1	–	–	–	–	–	2	–	–	24	8	2	3	–
13	GK	Richard O'Donnell	19	–	–	–	–	–	–	–	–	–	–	–	19	–	–	2	–
14	AM	Sam Hoskins	18	9	2	1	–	–	–	–	–	1	–	–	20	9	2	6	–
16	CB	Aaron Pierre	19	–	–	2	–	–	1	–	–	1	–	–	23	–	–	3	–
17	CM	Shaun McWilliams	15	4	–	1	–	–	–	–	–	1	–	–	17	4	–	6	–
18	RB	Aaron Phillips	2	–	–	–	–	–	1	–	–	–	–	–	3	–	–	–	–
19	ST	Chris Long	30	7	9	1	–	–	1	–	–	2	1	–	34	8	9	4	–
21	CM	John-Joe O'Toole	25	4	6	1	1	–	–	–	–	–	–	–	26	5	6	7	1
22	CM	Matt Crooks	29	1	4	1	–	–	1	–	–	2	–	–	33	1	4	10	3
24	RB	Shay Facey	13	2	1	–	–	–	–	–	–	–	–	–	13	2	1	2	–
25	GK	James Goff	–	–	–	–	–	–	–	–	–	–	–	–	–	–	–	–	–
26	CB	Regan Poole	18	4	–	1	–	–	–	–	–	1	–	–	20	4	–	2	–
29	CM	Matt Grimes	43	1	4	–	–	–	–	–	–	1	2	–	44	3	4	13	–
36	AM	Jack Bridge	1	3	–	–	–	–	–	–	–	–	–	–	1	3	–	–	–
37	CB	Jordan Turnbull	14	–	–	–	–	–	–	–	–	–	–	–	14	–	–	2	–
39	LB	Joe Bunney	11	1	–	–	–	–	–	–	–	–	–	–	11	1	–	1	–
40	LM	Morgan Roberts	–	1	–	–	–	–	–	–	–	–	–	–	–	1	–	–	–
42	ST	Kevin Luckassen	1	3	1	–	–	–	–	–	–	–	–	–	1	3	1	1	–
Players out on loan:
7	ST	Billy Waters	9	8	–	–	2	–	1	–	–	2	1	–	12	11	–	3	–
12	ST	Leon Lobjoit	–	–	–	–	–	–	–	1	–	–	–	–	–	1	–	–	–
15	AM	Dean Bowditch	3	8	–	2	–	–	–	–	–	1	2	–	5	11	–	1	–
23	ST	Joe Iaciofano	–	–	–	–	–	–	–	–	–	–	1	–	–	1	–	–	–
27	LB	Raheem Hanley	3	1	–	–	–	–	–	–	–	1	–	–	4	1	–	–	–
30	GK	Luke Coddington	1	–	–	–	–	–	–	–	–	1	–	–	2	–	–	–	–
Players no longer at the club:
9	ST	Marc Richards	7	12	1	1	1	–	–	1	–	3	–	–	11	14	1	–	–
9	ST	Boris Mathis	2	3	–	–	–	–	–	–	–	–	–	–	2	3	–	–	–
10	ST	Alex Revell	10	5	2	–	–	–	1	–	–	1	1	1	12	6	3	–	–
13	GK	Matt Ingram	20	–	–	–	–	–	–	–	–	–	–	–	20	–	–	–	–
20	LB	George Smith	5	1	–	1	–	–	–	1	–	2	–	–	8	2	–	–	–
24	CB	Ryan McGivern	–	1	–	1	–	–	–	–	–	1	–	–	2	1	–	–	–
28	RW	Hildeberto Pereira	4	8	–	–	–	–	–	–	–	–	–	–	4	8	–	3	1
31	CM	Matt Taylor	1	–	–	–	–	–	–	–	–	–	–	–	1	–	–	–	–
37	AM	Lewis McGugan	7	2	–	1	1	–	–	–	–	2	1	1	10	3	1	3	–
45	W	Gboly Ariyibi	3	9	–	–	–	–	–	–	–	–	–	–	3	9	–	–	–

== Awards ==
=== Club awards ===
At the end of the season, Northampton's annual award ceremony, including categories voted for by the players and backroom staff, the supporters, will see the players recognised for their achievements for the club throughout the 2017–18 season.

Player of the Year Award	Ash Taylor
Players' Player of the Year Award	Ash Taylor
Academy Player of the Year Award	Morgan Roberts
Goal of the Season Award	Daniel Powell (vs. Gillingham)

== Transfers ==
=== Transfers in ===
Date from	Position	Nationality	Name	From	Fee	Ref.
1 July 2017	CB	(England)	Leon Barnett	Bury	Free	
1 July 2017	LW	(England)	Dean Bowditch	Milton Keynes Dons	Free	
1 July 2017	CM	(Republic of Ireland)	Sam Foley	Port Vale	Free	
1 July 2017	CF	(England)	Leon Lobjoit	Buckingham Town	Free	
1 July 2017	RW	(England)	Daniel Powell	Milton Keynes Dons	Free	
1 July 2017	LB	(England)	George Smith	Gateshead	Undisclosed	
1 July 2017	CF	(England)	Billy Waters	Cheltenham Town	Undisclosed	
4 July 2017	MF	(Iraq)	Yaser Kasim	Swindon Town	Free	
5 July 2017	CB	(Wales)	Ash Taylor	Aberdeen	Free	
18 July 2017	DM	(England)	Matt Crooks	Rangers	Undisclosed	
21 July 2017	CB	(Grenada)	Aaron Pierre	Wycombe Wanderers	Free	
17 August 2017	GK	(England)	Luke Coddington	Huddersfield Town	Free	
2 October 2017	CM	(England)	Lewis McGugan	Sheffield Wednesday	Free	
3 November 2017	LB	(Northern Ireland)	Ryan McGivern	Shrewsbury Town	Free	

=== Transfers out ===
Date from	Position	Nationality	Name	To	Fee	Ref.
1 July 2017	RM	(England)	Paul Anderson	Mansfield Town	Released	(Note: Paul Anderson joined Mansfield Town following his release.)
1 July 2017	CM	(England)	Harry Beautyman	Stevenage	Free	
1 July 2017	CB	(Scotland)	Zander Diamond	Mansfield Town	Released	(Note: Zander Diamond joined Mansfield Town following his release.)
1 July 2017	RB	(Wales)	Neal Eardley	Lincoln City	Released	(Note: Neal Eardley joined Lincoln City following his release.)
1 July 2017	CB	(England)	Rod McDonald	Coventry City	Undisclosed	
1 July 2017	GK	(England)	Adam Smith	Bristol Rovers	Released	(Note: Adam Smith joined Bristol Rovers following his release.)
1 July 2017	RW	(England)	Emmanuel Sonupe	Free agent	Released	
1 July 2017	CB	(Democratic Republic of the Congo)	Gabriel Zakuani	Gillingham	Released	(Note: Gabriel Zakuani joined Gillingham following his release.)
8 July 2017	CM	(England)	Jak McCourt	Chesterfield	Mutual consent	(Note: Jak McCourt joined Chesterfield following his departure.)
22 August 2017	LM	(England)	Matthew Taylor	Swindon Town	Free	

=== Loans in ===
Start date	Position	Nationality	Name	From	End date	Ref.
7 July 2017	CB	(Wales)	Regan Poole	Manchester United	30 June 2018	
28 July 2017	CF	(England)	Chris Long	Burnley	30 June 2018	
18 August 2017	CM	(England)	Matt Grimes	Swansea City	30 June 2018	
31 August 2017	GK	(England)	Matt Ingram	Queens Park Rangers	30 June 2018	

=== Loans out ===
Start date	Position	Nationality	Name	To	End date	Ref.
25 August 2017	GK	(England)	James Goff	St Ives Town	22 September 2017	
16 September 2017	GK	(England)	Luke Coddington	Wrexham	14 October 2017	
25 September 2017	CF	(England)	Leon Lobjoit	Corby Town	24 October 2017	
26 September 2017	FW	(England)	Joe Iaciofano	Chesham United	26 November 2017	(Note: On 27 October, Joe Iaciofano extended his loan with Chesham United by a further month.)
27 October 2017	CF	(England)	Leon Lobjoit	Nuneaton Town	26 November 2017	
13 December 2017	CF	(England)	Leon Lobjoit	Corby Town	January 2018	
