= Joe Iaciofano =

English footballer

Personal information
- Full name: Giuseppe James Iaciofano
- Date of birth: 10 September 1998 (age 28)
- Place of birth: Northampton, England
- Height: 1.74 m (5 ft 8 1/2 in)
- Position: Forward

Team information
- Current team: Royston Town

Youth career
- 2009–2016: Northampton Town

Senior career*
Years	Team	Apps	(Gls)
2016–2019	Northampton Town	1	(0)
2017	→ Corby Town (loan)	6	(3)
2017–2018	→ Chesham United (loan)	17	(15)
2018	→ Brackley Town (loan)	9	(0)
2018–2019	→ AFC Mansfield (loan)	11	(12)
2019	→ Banbury United (loan)	8	(2)
2019–2020	St Albans City	32	(15)
2020–2021	Havant & Waterlooville	12	(6)
2021–2023	Oxford City	61	(28)
2023	→ Banbury United (loan)	4	(1)
2023–2025	Hemel Hempstead Town	50	(13)
2025	→ Hampton & Richmond Borough (loan)	6	(0)
2025–	Royston Town	36	(13)
- * Club domestic league appearances and goals as of 10:57, 8 October 2026 (UTC)

Giuseppe James "Joe" Iaciofano (born 10 September 1998) is an English professional footballer who plays as a forward for Southern League Division One Central club Royston Town.

== Early life ==
Born in Northampton, Iaciofano attended Northampton School for Boys.

== Club career ==
=== Northampton Town ===
Iaciofano joined the Northampton Town academy in November 2009. He made his senior debut for the club as a 75th-minute substitute replacing fellow countryman Alex Revell in a 1–1 draw with West Ham United U23s in the EFL Trophy on 8 November 2016. Then on 13 December, he was handed an FA Cup debut (in Northampton's 1–0 away defeat to Stourbridge). Iaciofano entered the field in the 91st-minute, coming on in place of Jak McCourt. He came on in stoppage time to make his senior league debut in a 0–1 defeat away to Sheffield United on 31 December 2016. After returning from his work experience loan at neighbouring Corby Town; Iaciofano signed a professional contract with Northampton Town in the summer of 2017.

On 6 May 2019, Iaciofano was told by Northampton that they would not be extending his contract.

==== Corby Town (work experience) ====
On 3 February 2017, Iaciofano joined semi-professional Northamptonshire-based side Corby Town of the Northern Premier League on a work experience basis to gain first-team experience.

==== Chesham United (loan) ====
Having signed his first professional deal with Northampton Town in summer 2017, Iaciofano was loaned to semi-professional Buckinghamshire-based side Chesham United of the Southern League Premier Division.

==== Mansfield (loan) ====
Iaciofano was loaned to Northern Premier League club AFC Mansfield in November 2018. On 4 January 2019, his loan was extended for a further month.

==== Banbury United (loan) ====
Iaciofano was loaned to Southern Premier Division Central club Banbury United on 26 February 2019. Iaciofano made his first appearance in a 1–1 draw against Redditch United and he scored his first goal in a 2–1 win over Needham Market.

He was one of 8 players released by Northampton at the end of the 2018–19 season; a further 3 were placed for sale.

=== Further Career ===
On 12 July 2019, Iaciofano joined National League South club St Albans City. He made his first appearance against Chippenham Town. On 6 August 2019, he scored his first goal for the Saints in a 1–1 draw against Dartford.

After being joint winner of the Golden Boot in the 2019–20 season, Iaciofano joined Havant & Waterlooville.

In June 2021, Iaciofano joined National League South side Oxford City, after fellow striker James Roberts had gone the opposite direction.

In March 2023, he returned to Banbury United on an initial one-month loan, his second loan spell with the club across his career.

On 30 June 2023, Iaciofano returned to the National League South following Oxford City's promotion, signing for Hemel Hempstead Town.

On 28 February 2025, he joined Hampton & Richmond Borough on loan, before returning to his home club for the last three games of the season.

On 5 July 2025, Iaciofano joined Southern League Premier Division Central side Royston Town.

== Career statistics ==
As of end of 2022–23 season

Appearances and goals by club, season and competition
Club	Season	League			FA Cup		League Cup		Other		Total	
Club	Season	Division	Apps	Goals	Apps	Goals	Apps	Goals	Apps	Goals	Apps	Goals
Northampton Town	2016–17	League One	1	0	1	0	0	0	1 (Note: Appearances in the EFL Trophy)	0	3	0
Northampton Town	2017–18	League One	0	0	0	0	0	0	1	0	1	0
Northampton Town	2018–19	League One	0	0	0	0	0	0	1	0	1	0
Northampton Town	Total		1	0	1	0	0	0	3	0	5	0
AFC Mansfield	2018–19	Northern Division One East	11	12	0	0	—		0	0	11	12
Banbury United (loan)	2018–19	Southern Premier Central	8	2	0	0	—		0	0	8	2
St Albans City	2019–20	National League South	32	15	3	2	—		1 (Note: Appearance(s) in FA Trophy)	0	36	17
Havant & Waterlooville	2020–21	National League South	12	2	5	2	—		2	1	19	5
Oxford City	2021–22	National League South	40	22	1	1	—		3 (Note: One appearance, one goal in FA Trophy and two appearances in National League South play-offs)	1	44	24
Oxford City	2022–23	National League South	18	6	1	0	—		2 (Note: One appearance, one goal in FA Trophy and one appearance in National League South play-offs)	1	21	7
Oxford City	Total		58	28	2	1	0	0	5	2	65	31
Banbury United (loan)	2022–23	National League North	4	1	—		—		0	0	4	1
Career total			136	60	11	5	0	0	11	3	158	68
