= John-Joe O'Toole =

English-Irish footballer (born 1988)

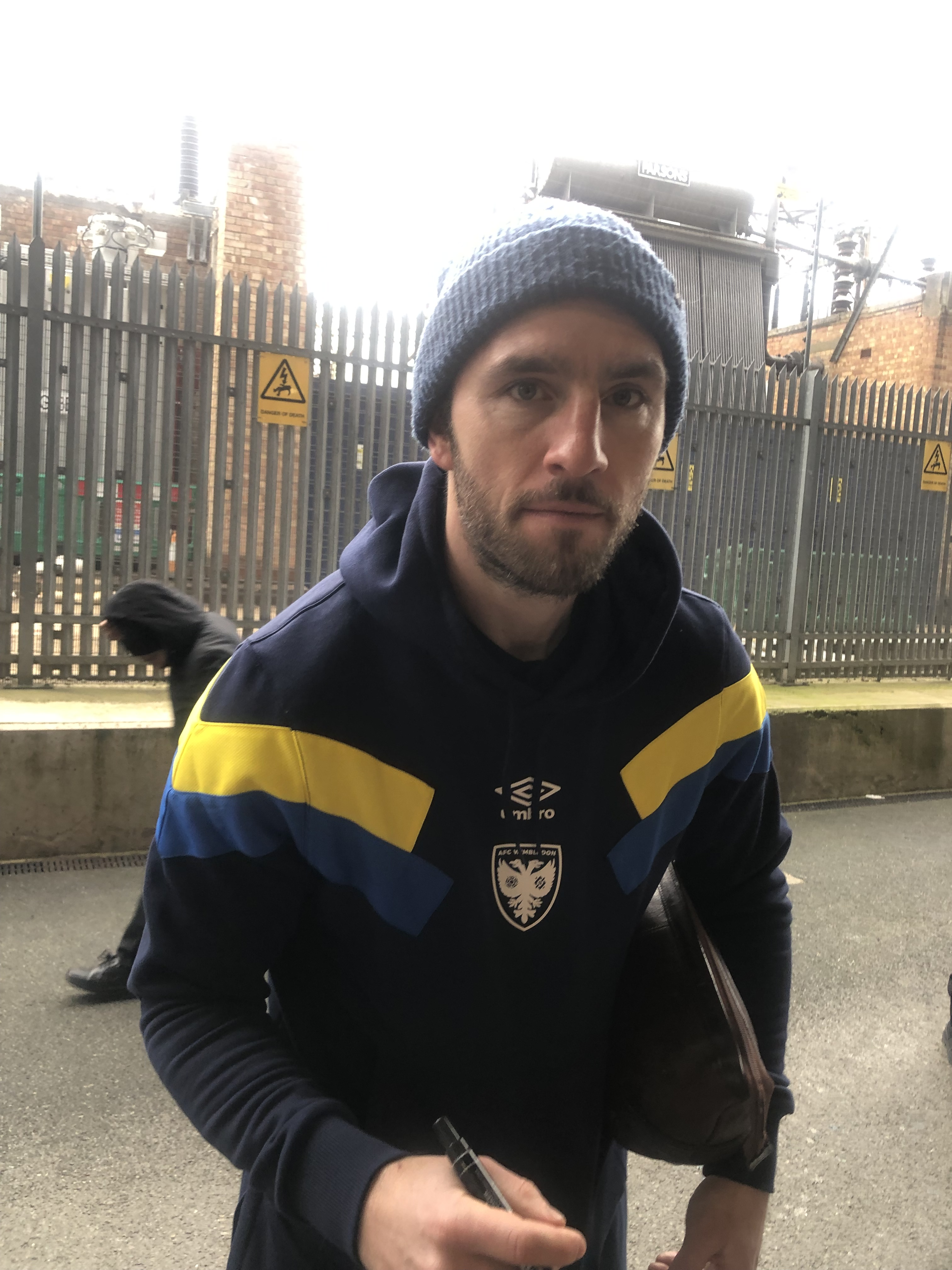
- O'Toole playing in 2025.

Personal information
- Full name: John Joseph O'Toole
- Date of birth: 30 September 1988 (age 38)
- Place of birth: Harrow, England
- Height: 6 ft 2 in (1.88 m)
- Position: Central midfielder

Team information
- Current team: AFC Rushden and Diamonds

Youth career
- –2007: Watford

Senior career*
Years	Team	Apps	(Gls)
2007–2010	Watford	57	(10)
2007	→ Wealdstone (loan)	9	(3)
2009	→ Sheffield United (loan)	9	(1)
2009	→ Colchester United (loan)	17	(1)
2010–2013	Colchester United	55	(1)
2013	→ Bristol Rovers (loan)	18	(3)
2013–2014	Bristol Rovers	41	(13)
2014–2019	Northampton Town	173	(33)
2014	→ Southend United (loan)	2	(0)
2019–2021	Burton Albion	41	(1)
2021–2024	Mansfield Town	45	(2)
2024	→ AFC Wimbledon (loan)	14	(0)
2024–2025	AFC Wimbledon	7	(1)
2026–	AFC Rushden & Diamonds	20	(1)

International career
2007–2011	Republic of Ireland U21	5	(1)
- * Club domestic league appearances and goals as of 11:00, 2 April 2025 (UTC)

John Joseph O'Toole (born 30 September 1988) is a professional footballer who plays as a defender for club AFC Rushden & Diamonds. He is a former Republic of Ireland under-21 international.

== Club career ==
=== Watford ===
Born in Harrow, Greater London, O'Toole spent the end of the 2006–07 season on loan at Wealdstone in the Southern Football League Premier Division where he made nine appearances and scored three goals. His Watford debut was against Southend United in the League Cup as a 71st-minute substitute on 28 August 2007. He made his League debut four days later as an 88th-minute substitute against Ipswich Town. In September 2007 he signed his first professional contract, a one-year deal.

O'Toole scored his first goal for Watford at home against Bristol City on 1 December 2007. Coming on as substitute in the 82nd minute, he headed a goal three minutes later to make the score 1–1, although Watford went on to lose 1–2. In the next game he started in place of captain Gavin Mahon and scored again, another header, in a 2–3 win away to Colchester United. His third goal for the club came on 26 January 2008 in a 4–1 home defeat against Wolverhampton Wanderers in the FA Cup fourth round. His performance the next weekend, once again at home to Wolves, won him a place in the Football League team of the week.

=== Loans ===
O'Toole signed a three-month loan deal for Sheffield United in February 2009 making his debut a couple of weeks later in a 2–1 away victory over Coventry City. O'Toole went on to make nine appearances for The Blades that season, scoring one goal in a local derby against Barnsley at the start of April. He picked up a training-ground injury in the final week of the season and so was unable to appear with Sheffield United in the play-off final at Wembley. With Sheffield United failing to win promotion, O'Toole returned to Watford at the end of his loan period.

On 2 September 2009, O'Toole joined Colchester United on a three-month loan deal until January 2010. He made his debut in a 0–0 draw away at Southampton, and scored his first goal in a 1–1 draw against Tranmere Rovers.

=== Colchester United ===
O'Toole made the loan spell permanent on 1 January 2010, signing a deal to keep him at Colchester until 2012. He made his debut on 23 January against Gillingham in a 0–0 draw. O'Toole scored his first goal as a full-time Colchester player in a 3–2 defeat against Bristol Rovers. O'Toole suffered a serious knee injury against Charlton which left him out for 9 months, after rupturing a cruciate ligament. Groin problems had restricted him to just 16 appearances in the 2011–12 season, but on 7 June 2012, O'Toole signed a new two-year deal, keeping the midfielder at the club until 2014.

=== Bristol Rovers ===
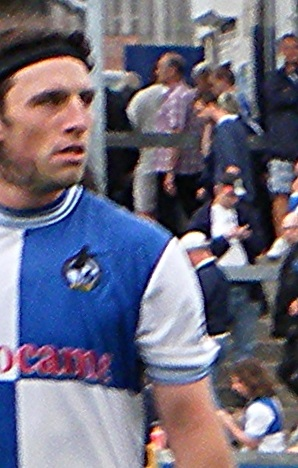
O'Toole playing for Bristol Rovers in 2013

On 31 December 2012, O'Toole signed for League Two team Bristol Rovers, initially on a one-month deal. The move saw him link up with former Colchester manager John Ward, who had recently joined Rovers. He made his debut the following day in a 2–1 win over Plymouth Argyle. He scored his first goal for the club in a convincing 3–0 away win over Fleetwood Town on 12 January 2013 with an 18-yard strike to seal the win. He also scored in another 3–0 emphatic victory over Burton Albion on 2 March 2013, scoring from close-range. In his final game of his loan spell, he scored the opening goal in a 4–2 away victory over Dagenham & Redbridge. O'Toole made 18 appearances alongside scoring his three goals for the club in a loan that was eventually extended until 1 April 2013. Manager Ward expressed interest in signing him permanently over the summer, with O'Toole still having one year to run on his Colchester contract.

After a long protracted transfer saga, O'Toole signed a three-year contract with Bristol Rovers, joining for an undisclosed fee on 24 July 2013. The season proved to be bittersweet for O'Toole. He ended the season as Rovers' top scorer with 15 goals and was included in the PFA Team of the Year for League Two but Rovers' suffered relegation out of the Football League for the first time since their admission in 1920. This was followed by O'Toole activating his release clause with Rovers leaving him free to join a new club on 30 May 2014.

=== Northampton Town ===
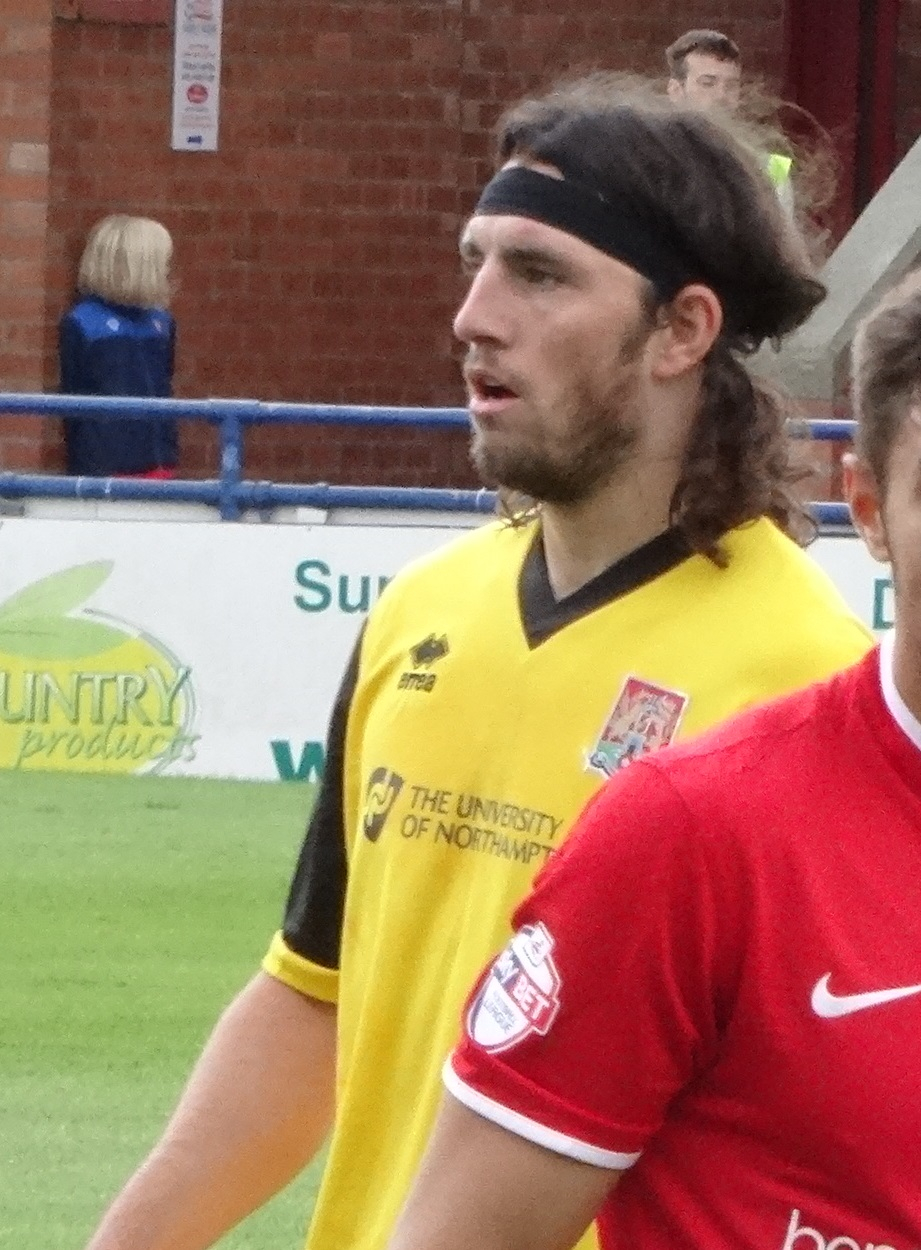
O'Toole playing for Northampton Town in 2014.

O'Toole signed for Northampton Town on a three-year contract on 30 June 2014. He became a cult figure at the club, with fans wearing wigs similar to his long dark hair.

=== Burton Albion ===
O'Toole signed for League One club Burton Albion on 21 May 2019 on a two-year contract after rejecting the offer of a new contract with Northampton. He scored his first goal for Burton in a 4–3 defeat to Wigan Athletic on 29 December 2020.

On 12 May 2021 it was announced that he would be one of 12 players leaving Burton at the end of the season.

=== Mansfield Town ===
On 23 October 2021, O'Toole signed for League Two side Mansfield Town on a contract until January 2022.

=== AFC Wimbledon ===
On 1 February 2024, O'Toole joined League Two side AFC Wimbledon on loan until the end of the 2023–24 season.

On 18 June 2024, O'Toole agreed to return to AFC Wimbledon on a permanent basis upon the expiration of his contract with Mansfield Town. He was released by Wimbledon at the end of the 2024–25 season.

=== AFC Rushden & Diamonds ===
On 17 January 2026, he joined Northern Premier League Division One Midlands side AFC Rushden & Diamonds.

== International career ==
O'Toole qualifies for the Republic of Ireland through his grandparents, who were born in County Mayo. He made his under-21 debut in a 1–0 away loss to Montenegro on 23 November 2007. Four days later he came on as an 83rd-minute substitute against Bulgaria and scored with a header in the 93rd minute, securing a 1–0 win. His third appearance came against England on 5 February 2008, a 3–0 defeat in which he played the entire game.

== Career statistics ==
As of match played 2 April 2025

Appearances and goals by club, season and competition
Club	Season	League			FA Cup		League Cup		Other		Total	
Club	Season	Division	Apps	Goals	Apps	Goals	Apps	Goals	Apps	Goals	Apps	Goals
Watford	2006–07	Premier League	0	0	0	0	0	0	—		0	0
Watford	2007–08	Championship	35	3	1	1	1	0	1 (Note: Appearances in Championship play-offs)	0	38	4
Watford	2008–09	Championship	22	7	3	0	3	1	—		28	8
Watford	2009–10	Championship	0	0	0	0	0	0	—		0	0
Watford	Total		57	10	4	1	4	1	1	0	66	12
Wealdstone (loan)	2006–07	Southern League Premier Division	9	3	—		—		—		9	3
Sheffield United (loan)	2008–09	Championship	9	1	—		—		0	0	9	1
Colchester United	2009–10 (Note: Part of this season was spent on loan from Watford)	League One	31	2	2	1	0	0	0	0	33	3
Colchester United	2010–11	League One	11	0	0	0	0	0	0	0	11	0
Colchester United	2011–12	League One	15	0	0	0	1	0	0	0	16	0
Colchester United	2012–13	League One	15	0	0	0	1	0	0	0	16	0
Colchester United	Total		72	2	2	1	2	0	0	0	76	3
Bristol Rovers (loan)	2012–13	League Two	18	3	—		—		—		18	3
Bristol Rovers	2013–14	League Two	41	13	3	2	1	0	1 (Note: Appearances in the Football League Trophy)	0	46	15
Bristol Rovers	Total		59	16	3	2	1	0	1	0	64	18
Northampton Town	2014–15	League Two	35	2	1	0	2	0	2	0	40	2
Northampton Town	2015–16	League Two	38	12	3	0	1	0	1	0	43	12
Northampton Town	2016–17	League One	40	10	1	1	3	1	2	0	46	12
Northampton Town	2017–18	League One	29	6	2	0	0	0	0	0	31	6
Northampton Town	2018–19	League Two	31	3	1	0	0	0	2	0	34	3
Northampton Town	Total		173	33	8	1	6	1	7	0	194	35
Southend United (loan)	2014–15	League Two	2	0	—		—		—		2	0
Burton Albion	2019–20	League One	25	0	4	0	4	0	3	0	36	0
Burton Albion	2020–21	League One	16	1	0	0	1	0	3	0	20	1
Burton Albion	Total		41	1	4	0	5	0	6	0	56	1
Mansfield Town	2021–22	League Two	27	2	3	0	0	0	4 (Note: One appearance one goal in Football League Trophy, three appearances in League Two play-offs)	1	34	3
Mansfield Town	2022–23	League Two	16	0	1	0	1	0	3	0	21	0
Mansfield Town	2023–24	League Two	2	0	0	0	0	0	1	0	3	0
Mansfield Town	Total		45	2	4	0	1	0	8	1	58	3
AFC Wimbledon (loan)	2023–24	League Two	14	0	0	0	0	0	0	0	14	0
AFC Wimbledon	2024–25	League Two	7	1	0	0	0	0	3	0	10	1
AFC Wimbledon	Total		21	1	0	0	0	0	3	0	24	1
Career total			488	69	25	5	19	2	26	1	558	77

== Honours ==
Northampton Town

- Football League Two: 2015–16

Individual

- EFL League One Player of the Month: January 2018
- Northampton Town Player of the Year: 2015–16
- PFA Team of the Year: 2013–14 League Two, 2015–16 League Two
