= Luke Coddington =

English footballer

Personal information
- Date of birth: 6 June 1995 (age 31)
- Place of birth: Middlesbrough, England
- Height: 1.89 m (6 ft 2 in)
- Position: Goalkeeper

Youth career
- –2014: Middlesbrough

Senior career*
Years	Team	Apps	(Gls)
2014–2016	Middlesbrough	0	(0)
2014	→ Guisborough Town (loan)	25	(0)
2016–2017	Huddersfield Town	0	(0)
2016	→ Wrexham (loan)	6	(0)
2017–2019	Northampton Town	3	(0)
2017	→ Wrexham (loan)	5	(0)
2018	→ Guiseley (loan)	13	(0)
2019–2021	Chesterfield	14	(0)
Total		57	(0)

International career
2011–2012	England U17	3	(0)
2012–2013	England U18	4	(0)
2013	England U19	3	(0)
- * Club domestic league appearances and goals

Luke Coddington (born 6 June 1995) is an English former professional footballer who played as a goalkeeper.

== Club career ==
=== Middlesbrough ===
Coddington signed for Middlesbrough as a youth at the age of nine. After spending a month on loan at Guisborough Town in 2014, Coddington was released in 2016.

=== Huddersfield Town ===
After his release, Coddington signed for then Championship club Huddersfield Town as a free agent.

=== Loan to Wrexham ===
In 2016, Coddington joined Wrexham on a month-long loan as cover for injured goalkeepers Chris Dunn and Shwan Jalal.

=== Northampton Town ===
In 2017, Coddington joined League One club Northampton Town on a free transfer, signing a two-year deal with the club. He made his debut in a 4–1 home defeat to Peterborough United.

=== Return to Wrexham ===
In September 2017, Coddington re-joined Wrexham, again on a month-long loan. He returned to Northampton in October, remaining unbeaten in his five games for Wrexham.

He was one of eight players released by Northampton at the end of the 2018–19 season.

=== Chesterfield ===
In June 2019 Coddington signed a two-year contract with National League side Chesterfield. He was released at the end of his contract and retired shortly afterwards.

== International career ==
Coddington has represented England at under-17, under-18 and under-19 level.

== Personal life ==
Coddington's grandfather, John Coddington, was also a professional footballer who played as a defender, who captained Huddersfield Town in the 1960s. His father, Matthew, was also a goalkeeper at Middlesbrough, however never made a first team appearance.

Coddington retired from football in May 2021 following a serious knee injury he suffered two years earlier. Following his retirement he began training as an engineering apprentice and eventually graduated from the ‘Richie Last school of excellence’.

== Career statistics ==
Appearances and goals by club, season and competition
Club	Season	League			FA Cup		League Cup		Other		Total	
Club	Season	Division	Apps	Goals	Apps	Goals	Apps	Goals	Apps	Goals	Apps	Goals
Middlesbrough	2014–15	Championship	0	0	0	0	0	0	0	0	0	0
Middlesbrough	2015–16	Championship	0	0	0	0	0	0	0	0	0	0
Middlesbrough	Total		0	0	0	0	0	0	0	0	0	0
Huddersfield Town	2016–17	Championship	0	0	0	0	0	0	0	0	0	0
Wrexham (loan)	2016–17	National League	6	0	0	0	—		0	0	5	0
Northampton Town	2017–18	League One	1	0	0	0	0	0	1	0	2	0
Northampton Town	2018–19	League One	2	0	0	0	0	0	0	0	0	0
Northampton Town	Total		1	0	0	0	0	0	1	0	2	0
Wrexham (loan)	2017–18	National League	5	0	0	0	—		0	0	5	0
Guiseley (loan)	2017–18	National League	13	0	0	0	—		0	0	11	0
Chesterfield	2019–20	National League	14	0	1	0	—		0	0	11	0
Career total			32	0	1	0	0	0	1	0	34	0
