= 2016–17 Northampton Town F.C. season =

Northampton Town
2016–17 season
- Chairman: Kelvin Thomas
- Manager: Rob Page (until 9 January); Justin Edinburgh (from 13 January)
- Stadium: Sixfields Stadium
- League One: 16th
- FA Cup: Second round
- EFL Cup: Third round
- EFL Trophy: Group stage
- Top goalscorer: League: Marc Richards; John-Joe O'Toole (10 goals); All: Marc Richards (13 goals)
- Highest home attendance: 7,798 vs Manchester United
- Lowest home attendance: 762 vs West Ham United Under 23s
- Average home league attendance: 6,218
Home colours	Away colours	Third colours

The 2016–17 season was Northampton Town's 120th season in their history and the first season back in League One, after promotion the previous season. Alongside competing in League One, the club also participated in the FA Cup, EFL Cup and EFL Trophy.

== Players ==
As of match played 30 April 2017.

No.	Name	Position	Nat.	Place of Birth	Date of Birth (Age)	Apps	Goals	Previous club	Date signed	Fee
Goalkeepers
1	Adam Smith	GK	(England)	Sunderland	23 November 1992 (aged 24)	94	0	Leicester City	26 June 2015	Free
26	David Cornell	GK	(Wales)	Waunarlwydd	28 March 1991 (aged 26)	10	0	Oldham Athletic	21 June 2016	Free
Defenders
2	Brendan Moloney	RB	(Republic of Ireland)	Beaufort	18 January 1989 (aged 28)	77	2	Yeovil Town	2 January 2015	Free
3	David Buchanan	LB	(Northern Ireland)	Rochdale (ENG)	6 May 1986 (aged 30)	107	0	Preston North End	28 May 2015	Free
5	Zander Diamond	CB	(Scotland)	Alexandria	13 March 1985 (aged 32)	125	5	Burton Albion	7 May 2014	Free
6	Gabriel Zakuani	CB	(Democratic Republic of the Congo)	Kinshasa	31 May 1986 (aged 30)	25	2	Peterborough United	24 June 2016	Free
18	Aaron Phillips	RB	(England)	Warwick	20 November 1993 (aged 23)	24	1	Coventry City	3 June 2016	Free
20	Raheem Hanley	LB	(England)	Blackburn	24 March 1994 (aged 23)	4	0	Swansea City	14 June 2016	Free
22	Lewin Nyatanga	CB	(Wales)	Burton (ENG)	18 August 1988 (aged 28)	42	0	Barnsley	8 August 2016	Loan
28	Rod McDonald	CB	(England)	Liverpool	11 April 1992 (aged 25)	37	3	Telford United	28 July 2015	Free
32	Neal Eardley	RB	(Wales)	Llandudno	6 November 1988 (aged 28)	10	0	Hibernian	12 January 2017	Free
Midfielders
4	Paul Anderson	RM/RW	(England)	Leicester	23 July 1988 (aged 28)	37	7	Bradford City	31 August 2016	Free
8	Hiram Boateng	CM	(England)	Wandsworth	8 January 1996 (aged 21)	16	0	Crystal Palace	31 December 2016	Loan
11	Gregg Wylde	LM/LW	(Scotland)	Kirkintilloch	23 March 1991 (aged 26)	12	1	Millwall	31 December 2016	Loan
12	Jak McCourt	CM	(England)	Liverpool	6 July 1995 (aged 21)	32	1	Barnsley	24 June 2016	Free
14	Sam Hoskins	AM	(England)	Dorchester	4 February 1993 (aged 24)	71	11	Yeovil Town	1 August 2015	Free
16	Harry Beautyman	CM	(England)	Newham	1 April 1992 (aged 25)	26	4	Peterborough United	22 July 2016	Undisclosed
17	Shaun McWilliams	CM	(England)	Northampton	14 August 1998 (aged 18)	5	0	Academy	30 April 2016	N/A
19	Emmanuel Sonupe	RM/RW	(England)	Camberwell	21 March 1996 (aged 21)	3	0	Tottenham Hotspur	12 August 2016	Free
21	John-Joe O'Toole	CM	(Republic of Ireland)	Harrow (ENG)	30 September 1988 (aged 28)	129	26	Bristol Rovers	30 June 2014	Free
31	Matt Taylor	LM	(England)	Oxford	27 November 1981 (aged 35)	48	8	Burnley	1 August 2016	Free
35	Luke Williams	AM	(England)	Middlesbrough	11 June 1993 (aged 23)	8	0	Scunthorpe United	27 January 2017	Loan
Forwards
7	Keshi Anderson	CF	(England)	Luton	6 April 1995 (aged 22)	14	3	Crystal Palace	17 January 2017	Loan
9	Marc Richards	CF	(England)	Wolverhampton	8 July 1982 (aged 34)	185	62	Chesterfield	14 May 2014	Free
10	Alex Revell	CF	(England)	Cambridge	7 July 1983 (aged 33)	39	10	Milton Keynes Dons	14 June 2016	Free
23	Joe Iaciofano	CF	(England)	Northampton	10 September 1998 (aged 18)	3	0	Academy	4 October 2016	N/A
24	Michael Smith	CF	(England)	Wallsend	17 October 1991 (aged 25)	14	2	Portsmouth	31 January 2017	Loan

== Pre-season ==
9 July 2016 Friendly	Northampton Sileby Rangers	0–3	Northampton Town	Northampton
14:00 BST		Report	A.Revell 10'; JJ.O'Toole 48'; D.Buchanan 48'	Stadium: Fernie Fields; Referee: Andy Woolmer

12 July 2016 Friendly	Nuneaton Town	1–0	Northampton Town	Nuneaton
19:30 BST	S.McDonald 33'	Report		Stadium: Liberty Way; Attendance: 393

16 July 2016 Friendly	Brackley Town	4–2	Northampton Town	Brackley
15:00 BST	A.Gudger 9'; D.Moyo 24', 62'; M.Lowe 48'	Report	M.Richards 10'; A.Revell 40'	Stadium: St James Park; Attendance: 653; Referee: Carl Henry

19 July 2016 Friendly	Northampton Town	1–1	Queens Park Rangers	Northampton
19:30 BST	A.Revell 86'	Report	A.El Khayati 80'	Stadium: Sixfields Stadium; Attendance: 2,423 (663); Referee: Andy Woolmer

26 July 2016 Friendly	Northampton Town	2–1	Wolverhampton Wanderers	Northampton
19:30 BST	H.Beautyman 37'; M.Richards 78' (pen.)	Report	N.Ennis 17'	Stadium: Sixfields Stadium; Attendance: 1,829

30 July 2016 Friendly	Eastleigh	4–1	Northampton Town	Eastleigh
15:00 BST	J.Constable 31'; M.Mandron 48', 52'; Wilson 60'	Report	S.McWilliams 77'	Stadium: Ten Acres; Attendance: 757

== Competitions ==
=== EFL League One ===
==== League table ====
Pos	Team	Pld	W	D	L	GF	GA	GD	Pts
14	Walsall	46	14	16	16	51	58	−7	58
15	AFC Wimbledon	46	13	18	15	52	55	−3	57
16	Northampton Town	46	14	11	21	60	73	−13	53
17	Oldham Athletic	46	12	17	17	31	44	−13	53
18	Shrewsbury Town	46	13	12	21	46	63	−17	51

Source: BBC Sport
Rules for classification: 1) Points; 2) Goal difference; 3) Number of goals scored

==== League position by match ====
Round	1	2	3	4	5	6	7	8	9	10	11	12	13	14	15	16	17	18	19	20	21	22	23	24	25	26	27	28	29	30	31	32	33	34	35	36	37	38	39	40	41	42	43	44	45	46
Ground	H	A	A	H	A	H	H	A	H	A	H	A	H	A	A	H	A	H	A	H	A	H	A	A	H	A	H	A	H	A	H	H	A	A	H	H	A	H	A	H	A	H	A	H	A	H
Result	D	D	D	D	D	W	W	L	W	W	L	D	L	L	W	W	L	L	L	L	W	L	W	L	L	L	L	L	W	L	W	W	D	L	L	W	W	W	L	D	D	L	L	D	L	D
Position	12	14	14	15	15	11	8	11	5	4	5	6	9	12	8	5	7	12	15	16	13	15	13	15	16	16	16	18	16	16	16	16	14	16	17	15	15	14	14	14	15	15	16	16	16	16

Updated to match(es) played on 31 December 2016 (UTC). Source: Northampton Town F.C.
A = Away; H = Home; W = Win; D = Draw; L = Loss

==== Matches ====
On 22 June 2016, the fixtures for the forthcoming season were announced.

6 August 2016 1	Northampton Town	1–1	Fleetwood Town	Northampton
15:00 BST	C.Neal 9' (o.g.)	Report	V.Nirennold 52'	Stadium: Sixfields Stadium; Attendance: 5,157 (109); Referee: Andy Haines

13 August 2016 2	Charlton Athletic	1–1	Northampton Town	Charlton
15:00 BST	J.Jackson 57'	Report	A.Revell 16'	Stadium: The Valley; Attendance: 11,567 (1,283); Referee: Darren England

16 August 2016 3	Oldham Athletic	0–0	Northampton Town	Oldham
19:45 BST		Report		Stadium: Boundary Park; Attendance: 3,327; Referee: Seb Stockbridge

20 August 2016 4	Northampton Town	0–0	AFC Wimbledon	Northampton
15:00 BST		Report		Stadium: Sixfields Stadium; Attendance: 5,185 (424); Referee: Nick Kinseley

27 August 2016 5	Coventry City	1–1	Northampton Town	Coventry
15:00 BST	M.Tudgay 63'	Report	H.Beautyman 30'	Stadium: Ricoh Arena; Attendance: 10,022 (1,608); Referee: Jeremy Simpson

4 September 2016 6	Northampton Town	3–2	MK Dons	Northampton
12:00 BST	H.Beautyman 8'; A.Revell 13'; M.Taylor 28'	Report	D.Bowditch 38'; S.Carruthers 90+4'	Stadium: Sixfields Stadium; Attendance: 6,618 (1,269); Referee: Nick Kinseley

10 September 2016 7	Northampton Town	2–0	Walsall	Northampton
15:00 BST	M.Taylor 23'; A.Revell 78' (pen.)	Report		Stadium: Sixfields Stadium; Attendance: 5,538 (601); Referee: Gavin Ward

17 September 2016 8	Chesterfield	3–1	Northampton Town	Chesterfield
15:00 BST	C.Wilkinson 7', 49'; D.Donohue 70'	Report	P.Anderson 62'	Stadium: Proact Stadium; Attendance: 5,910 (736); Referee: Rob Jones

24 September 2016 9	Northampton Town	4–0	Southend United	Northampton
15:00 BST	JJ.O'Toole 46'; A.Revell 51' (pen.); M.Taylor 59'; P.Anderson 78'	Report	J.Demetriou (red card) 50'	Stadium: Sixfields Stadium; Attendance: 6,138 (770); Referee: Ross Joyce

27 September 2016 10	Swindon Town	1–3	Northampton Town	Swindon
19:45 BST	S.Murray 67'	Report	N.Beautyman 7'; JJ.O'Toole 76'; K.Gorré 82'	Stadium: County Ground; Attendance: 6,590 (433); Referee: Brett Huxtable

1 October 2016 11	Northampton Town	2–3	Bristol Rovers	Northampton
15:00 BST	A.Revell 9', 76'; G.Zakuani (red card) 90+1'	Report	R.Gaffney 60'; P.Hartley 71'; C.Colkett 90+2'	Stadium: Sixfields Stadium; Attendance: 6,642 (997); Referee: Graham Horwood

8 October 2016 12	Scunthorpe United	1–1	Northampton Town	Scunthorpe
15:00 BST	J.Morris 44'	Report	M.Taylor (red card) 59'; J.McCourt 74'	Stadium: Glanford Park; Attendance: 4,714; Referee: Darren Handley

15 October 2016 13	Northampton Town	1–3	Millwall	Northampton
15:00 BST	J.McCourt (red card) 54'; M.Richards 80'	Report	L.Gregory 32'; C.Butcher 60'; S.Morison 89'	Stadium: Sixfields Stadium; Attendance: 6,908 (1,019); Referee: Ben Toner

18 October 2016 14	Peterborough United	3–0	Northampton Town	Peterborough
19:45 BST	S.Coulthirst 14'; Z.Diamond 36' (o.g.); T.Nichols 83'	Report		Stadium: ABAX Stadium; Attendance: 9,157 (2,142); Referee: Neil Swarbrick

22 October 2016 15	Shrewsbury Town	2–4	Northampton Town	Shrewsbury
15:00 BST	I.Toney 36' (pen.), 90+4' (pen.)	Report	G.Zakuani 22'; P.Anderson 31', 89'; S.Hoskins 65'	Stadium: New Meadow; Attendance: 5,023 (593); Referee: Trevor Kettle

29 October 2016 16	Northampton Town	3–2	Bury	Northampton
15:00 BST	M.Richards 36', 64' (pen.); M.Taylor 71'	Report	G.Miller 74'; Z.Ismail 82'	Stadium: Sixfields Stadium; Attendance: 5,739 (282); Referee: Carl Boyeson

12 November 2016 17	Gillingham	2–1	Northampton Town	Gillingham
15:00 GMT	M.Ehmer 48'; J.Emmanuel-Thomas 90+2'	Report	JJ.O'Toole 36'	Stadium: Priestfield Stadium; Attendance: 5,790 (637); Referee: Lee Probert

19 November 2016 18	Northampton Town	0–1	Peterborough United	Northampton
15:00 GMT		Report	C.Forrester 90+2'	Stadium: Sixfields Stadium; Attendance: 7,675 (1,462); Referee: Darren Bond

22 November 2016 19	Bradford City	1–0	Northampton Town	Bradford
19:45 GMT	J.Hanson 56'	Report		Stadium: The Coral Windows Stadium; Attendance: 16,935 (243); Referee: Chris Sarginson

26 November 2016 20	Northampton Town	0–1	Bolton Wanderers	Northampton
15:00 GMT		Report	Z.Clough 25'	Stadium: Sixfields Stadium; Attendance: 7,018 (1,264); Referee: Darren Deadman

10 December 2016 21	Port Vale	2–3	Northampton Town	Burslem
15:00 GMT	R.Taylor 52'; R.Cicilia 90+2'	Report	G.Zakuani 22'; S.Hoskins 78'; P.Anderson 90'	Stadium: Vale Park; Attendance: 4,379 (451); Referee: Graham Salisbury

17 December 2016 22	Northampton Town	2–3	Rochdale	Northampton
15:00 GMT	M.Taylor 16'; S.Hoskins 57'	Report	M.Lund 19', 63', 67'	Stadium: Sixfields Stadium; Attendance: 5,247 (261); Referee: Eddie Ilderton

26 December 2016 23	Oxford United	0–1	Northampton Town	Oxford
15:00 GMT		Report	M.Richards 90+4'	Stadium: Kassam Stadium; Attendance: 11,790 (1,128); Referee: John Brooks

31 December 2016 24	Sheffield United	1–0	Northampton Town	Sheffield
13:00 GMT	K.Freeman 89'	Report		Stadium: Bramall Lane; Attendance: 24,194 (1,650); Referee: Darren Drysdale

2 January 2017 25	Northampton Town	1–2	Bradford City	Northampton
15:00 GMT	A.Revell 39'	Report	M.Marshall 73'; J.Hiwula 86'	Stadium: Sixfields Stadium; Attendance: 6,031 (1,067); Referee: Scott Duncan

7 January 2017 26	Bristol Rovers	5–0	Northampton Town	Horfield
15:00 GMT	B.Bodin 7'; E.Harrison 17', 21', 24', 54'	Report		Stadium: Memorial Stadium; Attendance: 8,424 (321); Referee: Gavin Ward

14 January 2017 27	Northampton Town	1–2	Scunthorpe United	Northampton
15:00 GMT	A.Revell 42'	Report	K.Van Veen 21'; J.Morris 83'	Stadium: Sixfields Stadium; Attendance: 5,649 (499); Referee: Graham Horwood

21 January 2017 28	MK Dons	5–3	Northampton Town	Bletchley
15:00 GMT	K.Agard 38'; C.Aneke 43' (pen.), 56'; D.Potter 63'; H.Barnes 79'	Report	G.Wylde 61'; M.Richards 71', 84' (pen.)	Stadium: Stadium MK; Attendance: 12,300 (3,039); Referee: Roger East

28 January 2017 29	Northampton Town	3–0	Coventry City	Northampton
15:00 GMT	K.Anderson 53', 64', 76'	Report	J.Willis (red card) 19'	Stadium: Sixfields Stadium; Attendance: 7,543 (1,463); Referee: Lee Probert

4 February 2017 30	Walsall	2–1	Northampton Town	Walsall
15:00 GMT	M.Preston 64'; E.Oztumer 69'	Report	JJ.O'Toole 23'; M.Richards (penalty missed) 90'	Stadium: Bescot Stadium; Attendance: 4,961 (941); Referee: Robert Jones

11 February 2017 31	Northampton Town	3–1	Chesterfield	Northampton
15:00 GMT	JJ.O'Toole 12', 42'; M.Richards 48'	Report	D.Faupala 54'	Stadium: Sixfields Stadium; Attendance: 5,824 (452); Referee: Richard Clark

14 February 2017 32	Northampton Town	2–1	Swindon Town	Northampton
19:45 GMT	L.Jones 64' (o.g.); JJ.O'Toole 82'	Report	L.Norris 81'	Stadium: Sixfields Stadium; Attendance: 5,094 (423); Referee: Darren Handley

18 February 2017 33	Southend United	2–2	Northampton Town	Southend
15:00 GMT	J.McGlashan 20'; S.Cox 31'	Report	M.Richards 29'; JJ.O'Toole 44'	Stadium: Roots Hall; Attendance: 8,425 (544); Referee: John Brooks

25 February 2017 34	Fleetwood Town	3–0	Northampton Town	Fleetwood
15:00 GMT	D.Cole 42'; B.Grant 56'; D.Ball 60'	Report		Stadium: Highbury Stadium; Attendance: 3,361 (400); Referee: Andy Haines

28 February 2017 35	Northampton Town	1–2	Oldham Athletic	Northampton
19:45 GMT	JJ.O'Toole 84'	Report	T.Obedeyi 23'; L.Erwin 90+2'	Stadium: Sixfields Stadium; Attendance: 4,636 (197); Referee: Brett Huxtable

4 March 2017 36	Northampton Town	2–1	Charlton Athletic	Northampton
15:00 GMT	M.Smith 32'; JJ.O'Toole 62'	Report	J.Botaka 36'	Stadium: Sixfields Stadium; Attendance: 7,118 (1,424); Referee: Ben Toner

11 March 2017 37	AFC Wimbledon	0–1	Northampton Town	Kingston upon Thames
15:00 GMT		Report	M.Taylor 86' (pen.)	Stadium: Kingsmeadow; Attendance: 4,512 (603); Referee: Nigel Miller

14 March 2017 38	Northampton Town	2–1	Port Vale	Northampton
19:45 GMT	A.Phillips 63'; M.Taylor 86'	Report	JJ.Hooper 73'	Stadium: Sixfields Stadium; Attendance: 4,812 (248); Referee: Gavin Ward

18 March 2017 39	Bolton Wanderers	2–1	Northampton Town	Bolton
15:00 GMT	A.Le Fondre 75' (pen.); F.Morais 82'	Report	M.Smith 57'	Stadium: Macron Stadium; Attendance: 14,255 (872); Referee: Richard Clark

25 March 2017 40	Northampton Town	0–0	Oxford United	Northampton
15:00 GMT		Report		Stadium: Sixfields Stadium; Attendance: 7,434 (1,399); Referee: Gavin Ward

1 April 2017 41	Rochdale	1–1	Northampton Town	Rochdale
15:00 BST	N.Mendez-Laing 58'	Report	P.Anderson 90+3'	Stadium: Spotland; Attendance: 2,939; Referee: Ross Joyce

8 April 2017 42	Northampton Town	1–2	Sheffield United	Northampton
15:00 BST	Richards 45+1'	Report	L.Clarke 61'; J.Fleck 88'	Stadium: Sixfields Stadium; Attendance: 7,425 (1,456); Referee: Mark Heywood

14 April 2017 43	Millwall	3–0	Northampton Town	Millwall
15:00 BST	A.O'Brien 27'; J.Wallace 38', 45+4'	Report		Stadium: The Den; Attendance: 10,886 (672); Referee: Graham Salisbury

17 April 2017 44	Northampton Town	1–1	Shrewsbury Town	Northampton
15:00 BST	M.Richards 21'	Report	M.Sadler 66'	Stadium: Sixfields Stadium; Attendance: 6,211 (676); Referee: Charles Breakspear

22 April 2017 45	Bury	3–0	Northampton Town	Bury
15:00 BST	J.Vaughan 3', 90+2'; G.Miller 72'	Report		Stadium: Gigg Lane; Attendance: 5,190 (772); Referee: Nigel Miller

30 April 2017 46	Northampton Town	0–0	Gillingham	Northampton
12:00 BST		Report		Stadium: Sixfields Stadium; Attendance: 7,034 (1,054); Referee: Darren England

=== FA Cup ===
5 November 2016 First round	Northampton Town	6–0	Harrow Borough	Northampton
15:00 GMT	P.Anderson 6'; M.Richards 11', 54'; JJ.O'Toole 70'; M.Taylor 82'; JJ.Hooper 90+2'	Report		Stadium: Sixfields Stadium; Attendance: 3,406 (371); Referee: Ross Joyce

13 December 2016 Second round	Stourbridge	1–0	Northampton Town	Stourbridge
19:45 GMT	J.Duggan 86'	Report		Stadium: War Memorial Athletic Ground; Attendance: 2,520; Referee: Andy Davies

=== EFL Cup ===
On 22 June 2016, the first round draw was made with Northampton Town drawn away against Barnsley. On 10 August 2016, the second round draw was made with Northampton Town drawn at home against West Bromwich Albion. On 24 August 2016, the third round draw was made with Northampton Town drawn at home against Manchester United.

9 August 2016 First round	Barnsley	1–2 (a.e.t.)	Northampton Town	Barnsley
19:45 BST	J.Scowen 21'	Report	A.Davies 52' (o.g.); JJ.O'Toole 114'	Stadium: Oakwell; Attendance: 4,445 (322); Referee: Carl Boyeson

23 August 2016 Second round	Northampton Town	2–2 (a.e.t.) (4–3 p)	West Brom	Northampton
19:45 BST	Z.Diamond 36'; A.Revell 82'	Report	J.McClean 45'; G.McAuley 47'	Stadium: Sixfields Stadium; Attendance: 5,516; Referee: Darren Bond
	Penalties
	S.Hoskins (penalty scored); M.Taylor (penalty scored); JJ.O'Toole (penalty missed); A.Revell (penalty scored); K.Gorré (penalty scored)		(penalty scored) S.Rondón; (penalty missed) S.Berahino; (penalty scored) D.Fletcher; (penalty scored) M.Phillips; (penalty missed) J.Morrison

21 September 2016 Third round	Northampton Town	1–3	Manchester United	Northampton
19:45 BST	A.Revell 43' (pen.)		M.Carrick 17'; A.Herrera 68'; M.Rashford 75'	Stadium: Sixfields Stadium; Attendance: 7,798 (944); Referee: Stuart Attwell

=== EFL Trophy ===
On 27 July 2016, the group-stage draw was made with Northampton Town drawn in a group with a West Ham United XI, Coventry City and Wycombe Wanderers.

==== Group stage ====
Pos	Div	Team	Pld	W	PW	PL	L	GF	GA	GD	Pts	Qualification
1	L1	Coventry City	3	3	0	0	0	11	5	+6	9	Advance to Round 2
2	L2	Wycombe Wanderers	3	2	0	0	1	8	4	+4	6	Advance to Round 2
3	ACA	West Ham United U21	3	0	1	0	2	3	8	−5	2	
4	L1	Northampton Town	3	0	0	1	2	2	7	−5	1	

Source: Sky Sports

30 August 2016 1	Northampton Town	0–3	Wycombe Wanderers	Northampton
19:45 BST		Report	D.Rowe 17'; P.Hayes 47'; G.Thompson 90+3'	Stadium: Sixfields Stadium; Attendance: 1,408 (74); Referee: Paul Tierney

4 October 2016 2	Coventry City	3–1	Northampton Town	Coventry
19:45 BST	D.Agyei 1'; J.Jones 8'; R.Lameiras 66'	Report	M.Richards 2'	Stadium: Ricoh Arena; Attendance: 2,085

8 November 2016 3	Northampton Town	1–1 (2–3 p)	West Ham United U23	Northampton
19:45 GMT	H.Beautyman 23'	Report	D.Parfitt-Williams 39'	Stadium: Sixfields Stadium; Attendance: 951; Referee: Graham Salisbury
	Penalties
	H.Beautyman (penalty missed); A.Potter (penalty scored); J.Byrom (penalty scored); E.Sonupe (penalty missed); JJ.O'Toole (penalty missed)		M.Browne (penalty missed); A.Pike (penalty scored); A.Lewis (penalty scored); D.Kemp (penalty scored)

=== Appearances, goals and cards ===
No.	Pos	Player	League One			FA Cup			EFL Cup			EFL Trophy			Total			Discipline	
No.	Pos	Player	Starts	Sub	Goals	Starts	Sub	Goals	Starts	Sub	Goals	Starts	Sub	Goals	Starts	Sub	Goals	Yellow card	Red card
1	GK	Adam Smith	40	–	–	1	–	–	3	–	–	–	–	–	44	–	–	1	–
2	RB	Brendan Moloney	19	4	–	1	–	–	2	–	–	–	–	–	22	4	–	5	–
3	LB	David Buchanan	45	–	–	2	–	–	3	–	–	3	–	–	53	–	–	7	1
4	W	Paul Anderson	28	7	6	2	–	1	–	–	–	–	–	–	30	7	7	2	–
5	CB	Zander Diamond	37	2	–	1	–	–	3	–	1	2	–	–	43	2	1	4	–
6	CB	Gabriel Zakuani	20	1	2	2	–	–	2	–	–	–	–	–	24	1	2	2	1
7	ST	Keshi Anderson	9	5	3	–	–	–	–	–	–	–	–	–	9	5	3	–	–
8	CM	Hiram Boateng	11	5	–	–	–	–	–	–	–	–	–	–	11	5	–	1	–
9	ST	Marc Richards	28	14	10	2	–	2	–	1	–	1	–	1	31	15	13	5	–
10	ST	Alex Revell	29	3	8	1	1	–	3	–	2	2	–	–	35	4	10	7	–
11	W	Gregg Wylde	6	6	1	–	–	–	–	–	–	–	–	–	6	6	1	–	–
12	CM	Jak McCourt	16	11	1	2	–	–	2	–	–	1	–	–	21	11	1	7	1
14	AM	Sam Hoskins	18	7	3	2	–	–	–	3	–	–	1	–	20	11	3	1	–
16	CM	Harry Beautyman	11	9	3	–	–	–	3	–	–	2	1	1	16	9	4	1	–
17	CM	Shaun McWilliams	2	3	–	–	–	–	–	–	–	–	–	–	2	3	–	–	–
18	RB	Aaron Phillips	17	1	1	1	–	–	1	1	–	3	–	–	22	2	1	5	–
19	W	Emmanuel Sonupe	–	1	–	–	–	–	–	–	–	2	1	–	2	2	–	1	–
20	LB	Raheem Hanley	–	1	–	–	1	–	–	–	–	–	2	–	–	4	–	1	–
21	CM	John-Joe O'Toole	34	6	10	–	1	1	2	1	1	2	–	–	38	8	12	14	1
22	CB	Lewin Nyatanga	34	3	–	1	–	–	1	–	–	3	–	–	39	3	–	3	–
23	ST	Joe Iaciofano	–	1	–	–	1	–	–	–	–	–	1	–	–	3	–	–	–
24	ST	Michael Smith	13	1	2	–	–	–	–	–	–	–	–	–	13	1	2	2	–
26	GK	David Cornell	6	–	–	1	–	–	–	–	–	3	–	–	10	–	–	–	–
28	CB	Rod McDonald	2	5	–	–	–	–	–	–	–	1	1	–	3	6	–	–	–
31	LM	Matt Taylor	43	–	7	2	–	1	3	–	–	–	–	–	48	–	8	7	1
32	RB	Neal Eardley	10	–	–	–	–	–	–	–	–	–	–	–	10	–	–	1	–
35	AM	Luke Williams	8	–	–	–	–	–	–	–	–	–	–	–	8	–	–	1	–
Players no longer at the club:
7	RM	Lawson D'Ath	–	1	–	–	–	–	–	1	–	1	1	–	1	3	–	–	–
8	CM	Joel Byrom	1	1	–	–	–	–	–	–	–	2	–	–	3	1	–	1	–
11	W	Kenji Gorré	9	3	1	–	–	–	3	–	–	1	1	–	13	4	1	2	–
13	GK	Paddy Kenny	–	–	–	–	–	–	–	–	–	–	–	–	–	–	–	–	–
15	W	Alfie Potter	3	7	–	–	1	–	1	2	–	1	–	–	5	10	–	3	–
30	ST	JJ Hooper	5	5	–	1	–	1	–	–	–	2	–	–	8	5	1	–	–

== Awards ==
=== Club awards ===
At the end of the season, Northampton's annual award ceremony, including categories voted for by the players and backroom staff, the supporters, will see the players recognised for their achievements for the club throughout the 2016–17 season.

Player of the Year Award	Zander Diamond
Players' Player of the Year Award	David Buchanan
Academy Player of the Year Award	Joe Iaciofano
Goal of the Season Award	Marc Richards (vs. Sheffield United)

== Transfers ==
=== Transfers in ===
Date from	Position	Nationality	Name	From	Fee	Ref.
1 July 2016	GK	(Wales)	David Cornell	Oldham Athletic	Free transfer	
1 July 2016	LB	(England)	Raheem Hanley	Swansea City	Free transfer	
1 July 2016	GK	(Republic of Ireland)	Paddy Kenny	Rotherham United	Free transfer	
1 July 2016	CM	(England)	Jak McCourt	Barnsley	Free transfer	
1 July 2016	RB	(England)	Aaron Phillips	Coventry City	Free transfer	
1 July 2016	CF	(England)	Alex Revell	Milton Keynes Dons	Free transfer	
1 July 2016	CB	(Democratic Republic of the Congo)	Gabriel Zakuani	Peterborough United	Free transfer	
21 July 2016	CM	(England)	Harry Beautyman	Peterborough United	Undisclosed	
1 August 2016	LM	(England)	Matthew Taylor	Burnley	Free transfer	
12 August 2016	RW	(England)	Emmanuel Sonupe	Tottenham Hotspur	Free transfer	
31 August 2016	RM	(England)	Paul Anderson	Bradford City	Free transfer	
12 January 2017	RB	(Wales)	Neal Eardley	Hibernian	Free transfer	

=== Transfers out ===
Date from	Position	Nationality	Name	To	Fee	Ref.
1 July 2016	W	(Wales)	Nicky Adams	Carlisle United	Free transfer	
1 July 2016	GK	(England)	Ryan Clarke	AFC Wimbledon	Free transfer	
1 July 2016	CM	(Republic of Ireland)	Paul Corry	Free agent	Released	
1 July 2016	RM	(England)	Chris Hackett	Free agent	Released	
1 July 2016	W	(England)	Ricky Holmes	Charlton Athletic	Undisclosed	
1 July 2016	LB	(England)	Evan Horwood	Chester (Note: Following Horwood's release, he signed for Chester.)	Released	
1 July 2016	RB	(Kenya)	Josh Lelan	Crawley Town (Note: Following Lelan's release, he signed for Crawley Town.)	Released	
1 July 2016	CM	(England)	Danny Rose	Portsmouth	Free transfer	
1 August 2016	CB	(England)	Ryan Cresswell	Eastleigh	Free transfer	
16 August 2016	CM	(England)	Jason Taylor	Free agent	Mutual consent	
31 December 2016	CM	(England)	Joel Byrom	Mansfield Town (Note: Following Byrom's departure, he signed for Mansfield Town.)	Contract cancelled	
6 January 2017	CM	(England)	Lawson D'Ath	Luton Town	Undisclosed	
31 January 2017	RW	(England)	Alfie Potter	Mansfield Town	Mutual consent	

=== Loans in ===
Date from	Position	Nationality	Name	From	Date until	Ref.
29 July 2016	RW	(Netherlands)	Kenji Gorré	Swansea City	3 January 2017	
8 August 2016	CB	(Wales)	Lewin Nyatanga	Barnsley	End of Season	
22 August 2016	CF	(England)	JJ Hooper	Port Vale	10 January 2017	
1 January 2017	DM	(England)	Hiram Boateng	Crystal Palace	End of Season	
1 January 2017	LM	(Scotland)	Gregg Wylde	Millwall	End of Season	
17 January 2017	SS	(England)	Keshi Anderson	Crystal Palace	End of Season	
27 January 2017	SS	(England)	Luke Williams	Scunthorpe United	End of Season	
31 January 2017	CF	(England)	Michael Smith	Portsmouth	End of Season	

=== Loans out ===
Date from	Position	Nationality	Name	To	Date until	Ref.
16 August 2016	MF	(England)	Shaun McWilliams	King's Lynn Town	25 March 2017	
3 February 2017	CF	(England)	Joe Iaciofano	Corby Town	22 April 2017	
23 March 2017	RM/RW	(England)	Emmanuel Sonupe	Kidderminster Harriers	End of Season	
