= Leon Lobjoit =

English footballer

Personal information
- Full name: Leon Alan Lobjoit
- Date of birth: 4 January 1995 (age 31)
- Place of birth: Hatfield, England
- Height: 6 ft 2 in (1.88 m)
- Position: Striker

Team information
- Current team: Peterborough Sports

Youth career
- Milton Keynes Dons
- 2012–2014: Coventry City

Senior career*
Years	Team	Apps	(Gls)
2014	Hemel Hempstead Town		
2014	New Bradwell St Peter	10	(11)
2014–2015	Leighton Town	4	(0)
2015	Arlesey Town	6	(1)
2015–2016	Queens Park Rangers	0	(0)
2016–2017	Buckingham Town		
2017–2018	Northampton Town	0	(0)
2017	→ Corby Town (loan)		
2017	→ Nuneaton Town (loan)	4	(0)
2018	→ Banbury United (loan)	1	(0)
2018	Brackley Town		
2018	AFC Rushden & Diamonds	2	(0)
2018	Oxford City	1	(0)
2018	MK Gallacticos	1	(1)
2019	Bedford Town	8	(4)
2019	Hemel Hempstead Town	8	(1)
2019–2020	Newport Pagnell Town	9	(14)
2020–2021	St Neots Town	7	(3)
2021–2023	Leighton Town	40	(49)
2023–2024	Daventry Town	21	(26)
2024–2025	Bedford Town	54	(44)
2025	Kettering Town	3	(1)
2025	Bedford Town	6	(0)
2025–2026	Potters Bar Town	6	(1)
2026	Stamford	20	(12)
2026–	Peterborough Sports	0	(0)
- * Club domestic league appearances and goals as of 19:53, 19 May 2026 (UTC)

Leon Alan Lobjoit (born 4 January 1995) is an English footballer who plays as a striker for Southern League Premier Division Central club Peterborough Sports.

== Career ==
Born in Hatfield, Lobjoit played youth football with Milton Keynes Dons and Coventry City, and non-league football with Hemel Hempstead Town, New Bradwell St Peter, Leighton Town, Arlesey Town and Buckingham Town. In March 2017 it was announced that he would sign a two-year professional contract with Northampton Town, effective from 1 July 2017. In September 2017 he joined local Evo-Stik Northern Premier League Division One South side Corby Town for a month to gain more first team experience. In October 2017 Lobjoit Joined Nuneaton Town on a one-month loan to gain experience at a higher level. On 2 February 2018 Leon moved to Banbury United on loan. He was released by Northampton at the end of the 2017–18 season, following their relegation. He then played for Brackley Town, AFC Rushden & Diamonds, Oxford City, MK Gallacticos, Bedford Town, Hemel Hempstead Town, Newport Pagnell Town and St Neots Town, before singing for Leighton Town. In the 2022–23 season he scored 60 goals, including several whilst suffering from an eye injury. He moved to Daventry Town in June 2023, before returning to Bedford Town in January 2024.

He scored 27 goals for Bedford Town in the 2024–25 season as the club were promoted to the National League North as champions of the Southern League Premier Division Central. However, he left the club during summer 2025, citing "work commitments" making him unable to commit to the extra travel of playing in the National League North, and he signed for Southern League Premier Division Central club Kettering Town. He returned to Bedford Town in October 2025, before joining Potters Bar Town in November 2025, and Stamford in January 2026.

In May 2026, Lobjoit followed manager Graham Drury in leaving Stamford to join recently relegated Southern League Premier Division Central side Peterborough Sports.
