= Raheem Hanley =

Kittian footballer (b.1994)

Personal information
- Full name: Raheem Shaquille Rushan Hanley
- Date of birth: 24 February 1994 (age 32)
- Place of birth: Blackburn, England
- Positions: Left-back; central midfielder; left wing

Team information
- Current team: West Didsbury & Chorlton

Youth career
- Fletcher Moss Rangers
- 2004–2010: Manchester United
- 2010–2012: Blackburn Rovers

Senior career*
Years	Team	Apps	(Gls)
2012–2014	Blackburn Rovers	0	(0)
2014–2016	Swansea City	0	(0)
2016–2018	Northampton Town	5	(0)
2018	→ FC Halifax Town	7	(0)
2019	Connah's Quay Nomads		
2019	Chorley	0	(0)
2019	Hereford	7	(0)
2019–2020	Mossley	?	(?)
2020–2022	Radcliffe		
2022–2023	Stalybridge Celtic		
2023	Runcorn Linnets		
2023–	West Didsbury & Chorlton	1	(0)

International career^{‡}
2012	England U19	3	(0)
2018–	Saint Kitts and Nevis	19	(0)
- * Club domestic league appearances and goals as of 17:44, 23 August 2023 (UTC) ‡ National team caps and goals as of 16:28, 18 November 2024 (UTC)

Raheem Shaquille Rushan Hanley (born 24 February 1994) is professional footballer who plays as a left-back for Midland League Premier Division club West Didsbury & Chorlton. Born in England, he represents the Saint Kitts and Nevis national team.

Hanley is an attacking left-back. He is also able to play in central midfield.

== Club career ==
=== Youth football ===
Hanley played for junior club Fletcher Moss Rangers before signing with the Manchester United academy in 2004.

=== Blackburn and Swansea ===
Hanley joined Blackburn Rovers from Manchester United following a successful trial in 2010. He initially struggled with injuries, but went on to play a successful role in the club's run in the 2011–12 FA Youth Cup, scoring in the semi-final against Burnley and playing both legs of the final against Chelsea in the centre of midfield as his side lost 4–1 on aggregate. He would also play regular under-21 football season as the Academy reached the final of the Academy League National Final. At the end of the 2012–13 season, he was offered a new contract by the club.

Hanley joined Swansea City in January 2014. He signed a new one-year contract with the Premier League side in April 2015. At the end of the 2015–16 season, Hanley was released without having made a single first team appearance.

=== Northampton Town ===
Hanley signed a two-year contract with League One side Northampton Town in June 2016. He promised to challenge David Buchanan for a first-team place, saying that manager Rob Page convinced him that Northampton was the best place for him to advance his career.

Hanley made his senior debut for Northampton as a 57th-minute substitute for JJ Hooper in a 3–0 home defeat to Wycombe Wanderers on 30 August 2016, in an EFL Trophy group stage match. However, Hanley spent most of the season on the sidelines, making five appearances in all competitions. At the end of the 2016–17 season, he was among four players to be placed on a transfer list.

Ahead of the 2017–18 season, Hanley went on a trial with Oxford United and featured in a trial match. In the season that followed he played for the Northampton first team on four occasions. On 10 March 2018, Hanley was loaned out to FC Halifax Town for the rest of the season. He made his Halifax debut on 10 March 2018, in a 3–1 win over Woking. He went on to make seven appearances for the National League side.

Hanley was released by Northampton at the end of the 2017–18 season, following their relegation from League One.

=== Non-League career ===
On 28 April 2019, after a little over one month at Connah's Quay Nomads, Hanley moved to National League North side Chorley until the end of the season.

Hanley joined National League North club Hereford on 2 August 2019 after a successful trial period. He subsequently signed for Mossley in November 2019 and Radcliffe in January 2020.

In October 2022, Hanley joined Northern Premier League Premier side Stalybridge Celtic and later in the season he would sign for Runcorn Linnets of the Northern Premier Division One West.

On 22 August 2023, North West Counties Premier side West Didsbury & Chorlton announced the signing of Hanley. He made his debut and won the club's supporter-nominated man of the match in a 2–0 victory against Skelmersdale United on the day of his signing.

== International career ==
Hanley represented England U19, being called up for the first time in October 2012. He went on to earn three caps.

Hanley's grandfather was from Saint Kitts and Nevis. In November 2018, he was called up to Saint Kitts and Nevis national football team and made his debut on 18 November 2018 in a CONCACAF Nations League qualifier against Canada, as a starter. In June 2023, Hanley was selected in his country's squad for the 2023 CONCACAF Gold Cup. He made one appearance at the tournament, playing the entire match as his side lost 5–0 to Jamaica in the group stage.

== Professional career statistics ==
Appearances and goals by club, season and competition
Club	Season	League			FA Cup		EFL Cup		Other		Total	
Club	Season	Division	Apps	Goals	Apps	Goals	Apps	Goals	Apps	Goals	Apps	Goals
Blackburn Rovers	2012–13	Championship	0	0	0	0	0	0	0	0	0	0
Blackburn Rovers	2013–14	Championship	0	0	0	0	0	0	0	0	0	0
Blackburn Rovers	Total		0	0	0	0	0	0	0	0	0	0
Swansea City	2014–15	Premier League	0	0	0	0	0	0	0	0	0	0
Swansea City	2015–16	Premier League	0	0	0	0	0	0	0	0	0	0
Swansea City	Total		0	0	0	0	0	0	0	0	0	0
Northampton Town	2016–17	League One	1	0	1	0	0	0	2 (Note: Appearance/s in the EFL Trophy.)	0	3	0
Career total			0	0	0	0	0	0	1	0	3	0

== Personal life ==
In November 2015, Hanley was banned from driving for 14 months after being caught speeding by the police.
