= 2020 EFL League Two play-off final =

Football match at Wembley Stadium

- The match took place behind closed doors at Wembley Stadium.
- Event: 2019–20 EFL League Two
Exeter City	Northampton Town
0	4
- Date: 29 June 2020
- Venue: Wembley Stadium, London
- Man of the Match: Callum Morton
- Referee: Michael Salisbury
- Attendance: 0

The 2020 EFL League Two play-off final was an association football match played on 29 June 2020 at Wembley Stadium, London, between Exeter City and Northampton Town to determine the fourth and final team to gain promotion from EFL League Two to EFL League One. The top three teams of the 2019–20 EFL League Two season gained automatic promotion to League One, while those placed from fourth to seventh place in the table took part in play-off semi-finals; the winners of these semi-finals competed for the final place for the 2020–21 season in League One.

The match was played behind closed doors to comply with restrictions during the coronavirus pandemic. It was thought to be the first ever competitive game behind closed doors at Wembley and was Northampton Town's first appearance at the stadium since the 2013 Football League Two play-off final.

Ryan Watson opened the scoring for Northampton Town after 11 minutes, before Callum Morton doubled their lead in the 31st minute. Exeter City's Dean Moxey was sent off midway through the second half before Sam Hoskins made it 3–0. Andy Williams scored Northampton Town's fourth goal late in the game to ensure his team won the match 4–0 and secure promotion to League One.

== Route to the final ==
Note: In all results below, the score of the finalist is given first (H: home; A: away).

EFL League Two final table, leading positions
Pos	Team	Pld	W	D	L	GF	GA	GD	Pts	PPG
1	Swindon Town	36	21	6	9	62	39	+23	69	1.92
2	Crewe Alexandra	37	20	9	8	67	43	+24	69	1.86
3	Plymouth Argyle	37	20	8	9	61	39	+22	68	1.84
4	Cheltenham Town	36	17	13	6	52	27	+25	64	1.78
5	Exeter City	37	18	11	8	53	43	+10	65	1.76
6	Colchester United	37	15	13	9	52	37	+15	58	1.57
7	Northampton Town	37	17	7	13	54	40	+14	58	1.57

Because of the COVID-19 pandemic, the Football League season was temporarily suspended on 13 March. Three weeks later this suspension was extended indefinitely. On 9 June, clubs in EFL League One and League Two, the third and fourth tiers of the English football league system, voted to curtail the season, meaning the final table would be calculated by a points-per-game (PPG) method. The play-offs would then be played between the clubs finishing fourth to seventh as normal. Exeter City finished the regular season in fifth place in League Two, two places ahead of Northampton Town. Both therefore missed out on the three automatic places for promotion to League One and instead took part in the play-offs to determine the fourth promoted team. The three promoted teams were Swindon Town (as champions), Crewe Alexandra and Plymouth Argyle. Cheltenham Town and Colchester United were the losing play-off semi-finalists.

Exeter City's play-off semi-final opponents were Colchester United, with the first leg taking place at the Colchester Community Stadium on 18 June 2020. It was the first EFL game to take place since the suspension in March, and was played behind closed doors. After a goalless first half, Cohen Bramall scored direct from a free kick with nine minutes of the game remaining, and the match ended 1–0 to Colchester United. The second leg of the semi-final took place four days later at St James Park in Exeter. Aaron Martin put the home side ahead with a 15 yards (14 m) strike after ten minutes. Jayden Richardson then gave Exeter an aggregate lead 13 minutes into the second half but an equaliser from Courtney Senior sent the match into extra time. In the 111th minute, Ryan Bowman scored the winning goal, to send Exeter to the final with a 3–2 aggregate victory.

In the other play-off semi-final, Cheltenham Town faced Northampton Town, with the first leg being played at Sixfields Stadium in Northampton on 18 June 2020. Fifteen minutes in, Ryan Broom fouled Michael Harriman in the Northampton Town penalty area; Ryan Watson's resulting penalty was saved by Owen Evans. Charlie Raglan put the visitors ahead midway through the first half before Conor Thomas made it a final score of 2–0 with four minutes of the game remaining. The BBC reporter Tom Garry described Evans, on loan from Wigan Athletic as putting on an "impressive goalkeeping display", keeping his third consecutive clean sheet. The second leg was played at Whaddon Road in Cheltenham four days later. Vadaine Oliver scored Northampton Town's opening goal with a header in the ninth minute of the match. Twelve minutes into the second half, Callum Morton levelled the aggregate score as the ball deflected off his head after a defensive mix-up in the Cheltenham Town box. He scored his second twenty minutes later when he converted a rebound from a Harriman shot which had struck the post after confusion between Will Boyle and Evans. The match ended 3–0 to Northampton Town who progressed to the Wembley final with a 3–2 aggregate win.

== Match ==
=== Background ===
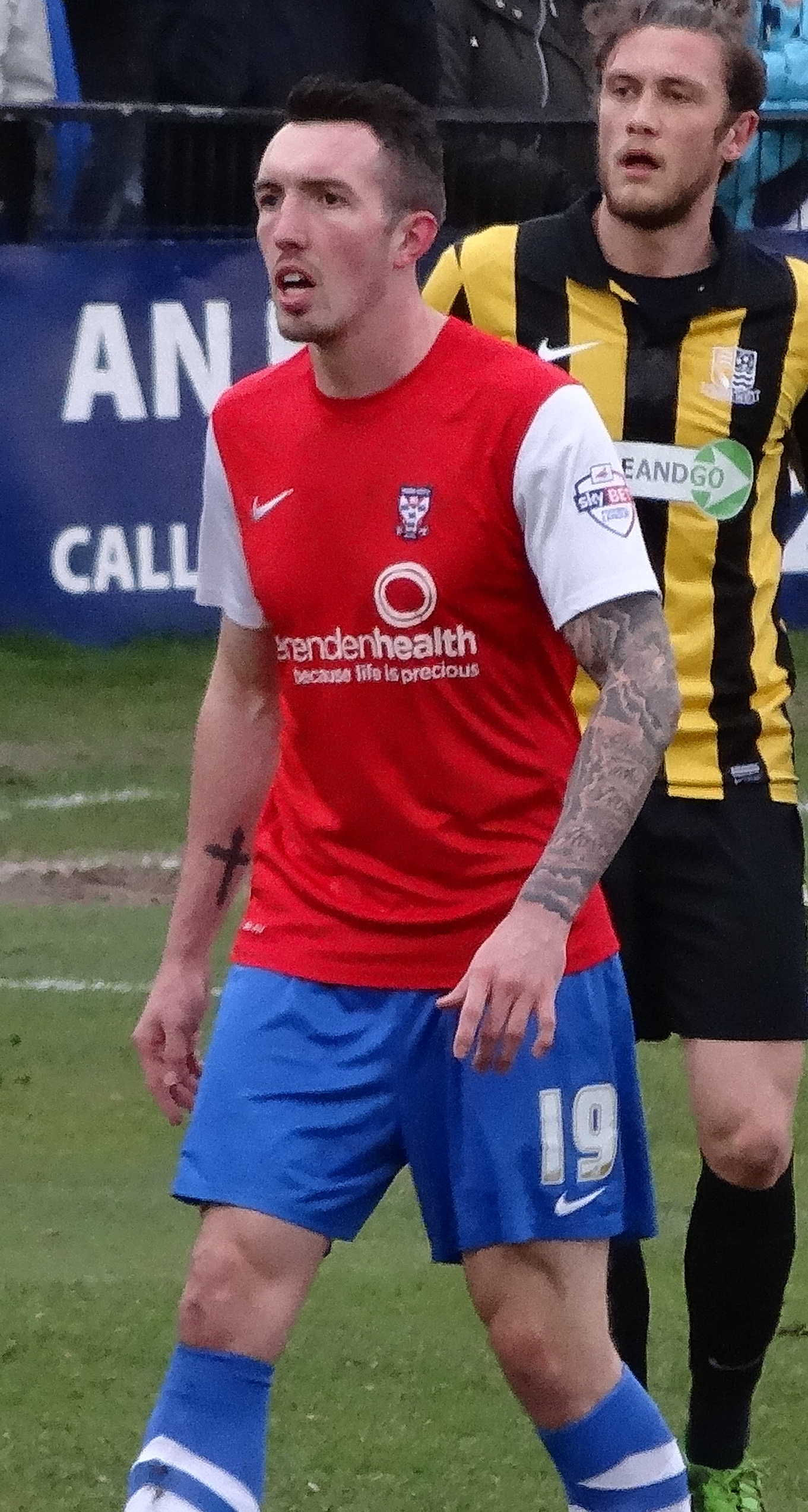
Ryan Bowman (pictured in 2014) was Exeter City's top scorer.

This was Northampton Town's fourth play-off final: they had won promotion from the fourth tier when they defeated Swansea City in the 1997 Football League Third Division play-off final at the old Wembley Stadium before losing the third tier final the following year 1–0 against Grimsby Town. They had also lost out to Bradford City 3–0 in the 2013 Football League Two play-off final. Exeter City were making their third fourth tier play-off final appearance in four years, having lost 2–1 to Blackpool in the 2017 EFL League Two play-off final and being defeated 3–1 by Coventry City in the following season's final. Exeter had also re-gained promotion to the Football League with victory over Cambridge United in the 2008 Conference Premier play-off final at Wembley. In the matches played between the two sides in the regular season, each team won once: Exeter City secured a 3–2 victory at home in December 2019 while Northampton Town won 2–0 the following February. The highest scorer for Exeter City during the regular league season was Ryan Bowman with 13 goals followed by Broom on 8, while Sam Hoskins and Andy Williams were joint-top marksmen for Northampton Town with eight apiece.

Northampton Town had played in League Two since being relegated from League One in the 2017–18 season, while Exeter City had been relegated to the fourth tier and remained there since the 2011–12 season. The referee for the match was Michael Salisbury, assisted by George Byrne and Matthew Jones, with Leigh Doughty acting as the fourth official and Natalie Aspinall the reserve assistant referee. The game was broadcast live in the UK on Sky Sports Main Event and Sky Sports Football. The EFL reported that it was believed to be the first match at Wembley Stadium played behind closed doors. Neither team were considered to be clear favourites to win the final by bookmakers, although Exeter were favoured in the press.

The Exeter City manager Matt Taylor made one change to his team from the semi-final against Colchester with Nigel Atangana replacing Archie Collins. Keith Curle made no changes to his Northampton Town team. No presentation to dignitaries was held before the match: a minute's silence was held in remembrance of Theo Foley who had represented both clubs, before the players and officials took the knee to observe the Black Lives Matter movement. Taylor reflected on Exeter's previous losses in play-off finals: "We've got a recent history with Wembley and play-off finals and we certainly don't want to be left wanting at the end of this one ... My memory's not gone back to those two occasions, when I was involved as a coach, because they were negative times in terms of the results that we got". Curle had suffered defeat to Exeter City in the play-off semi-final in 2017 when he was Carlisle United manager. Northampton Town played in the black shirts and shorts of their away strip, with claret socks, while Exeter wore their traditional red and white shirts, with black and white shorts and socks.

=== First half ===
Northampton Town kicked off around 7:30 p.m. and dominated the early stages of the match. In the fourth minute, Exeter City's Randell Williams was fouled by Scott Wharton who was shown the first yellow card of the game: the resulting free kick was cleared. On ten minutes, a long throw-in from Northampton Town's Charlie Goode was cleared by Aaron Martin. The subsequent throw-in was headed away and fell to Ryan Watson on the edge of the Exeter City penalty area. He controlled the ball on his thigh, feigned to shoot to send Jake Taylor the wrong way before taking a shot which deflected off Martin's heel past Jonny Maxted in the Exeter City goal. Four minutes after the restart, Northampton Town won a free kick about 25 yards (23 m) from Exeter City's goal. The direct shot from Nicky Adams was saved by Maxted and the Exeter City goalkeeper then kept out the follow-up strike. Vadaine Oliver then headed over the Exeter City crossbar from a Goode cross. Midway though the first half, play was hallted in order for both teams to take a drinks break. In the 29th minute, Exeter City's Richardson made a run down the left but the ball went out for a goal kick. Two minutes later, Northampton Town were forced to make their first substitution of the match: Adams went off with a leg injury to be replaced by Mark Marshall. Almost immediately, Morton doubled Northampton Town's lead after converting a flick-on from Jordan Turnbull from a Wharton header. On 35 minutes, a curling strike from Exeter City's Williams was blocked by Harriman. Three minutes later, Maxted made the first of several saves and with four minutes of the half remaining, Northampton Town had accumulated six shots on target without reply. Four minutes of injury time were indicated, and one minute in, Bowman beat the offside trap to run clear, only to trip over before being able to shoot. Maxted then made two more saves, from both Oliver and Goode, to keep the score 2–0 to Northampton Town at half time.

=== Second half ===
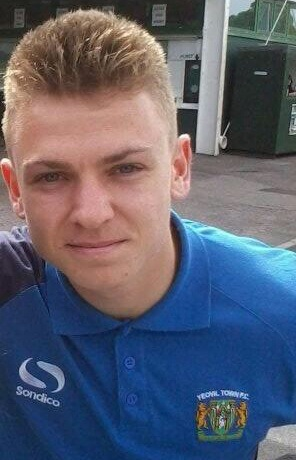
Sam Hoskins (pictured in 2014) scored Northampton Town's third goal.

Neither side made any changes during half time and the second half was kicked off by Exeter City. Three minutes in and following a free kick, Watson's shot was blocked by Exeter players. In the 51st minute, Exeter City made their first substitutions of the evening, with Richardson and Alex Fisher being replaced by Tom Parkes and Collins. Two minutes later, Northampton Town's Hoskins was brought down by Atangana in the penalty area but the referee declined to award a penalty and in the 55th minute, Watson was booked for a foul on Randell Williams. On 59 minutes, Exeter City were reduced to ten players when Dean Moxey was sent off after being shown a red card for a late tackle on Watson. Jack Sparkes was brought on two minutes later to replace Atangana. The second half was interrupted in the 68th minute for a drinks break. With 19 minutes of regular time remaining, Morton went through one-on-one with Maxted but his shot went just past the outside of the post. Collins was then brought down in the box as he went to shoot, but no penalty was awarded and replays indicated that Northampton Town's Marshall won the ball legally. In the 75th minute, Alan McCormack and Oliver were replaced by James Olayinka and Harry Smith for Northampton Town. Five minutes later Hoskins made it 3–0 converting Marshall's pass at the far post. On 82 minutes, Exeter City made their final substitution of the game with Pierce Sweeney being replaced by Brennan Dickenson. With four minutes of the match remaining, Martin was shown a yellow card for a foul on Morton, and two minutes later, Northampton Town made their final changes, with Morton and Watson being substituted for Andy Williams and Paul Anderson. A minute after his introduction, Andy Williams increased Northampton Town's lead further when he scored from close range after Smith headed on a long throw-in from Goode. Four minutes of additional time were played but with no change to the score: Northampton Town won the match 4–0 and were promoted to League One.

=== Details ===
29 June 2020
19:30 BST

Exeter City	0–4	Northampton Town
	Report	Watson 11'; Morton 31'; Hoskins 80'; Williams 89'

Wembley Stadium, London
Attendance: 0
Referee: Michael Salisbury

Exeter City	Northampton Town

GK	23	(England) Jonny Maxted
CB	2	(Republic of Ireland) Pierce Sweeney		(substituted off) 82'
CB	5	(England) Aaron Martin	(yellow card) 86'
CB	21	(England) Dean Moxey	(red card) 59'
RWB	11	(England) Randell Williams
CM	25	(Wales) Jake Taylor
CM	4	(France) Nigel Atangana		(substituted off) 61'
LWB	20	(England) Jayden Richardson		(substituted off) 51'
AM	8	(England) Nicky Law
CF	12	(England) Ryan Bowman
CF	18	(England) Alex Fisher		(substituted off) 51'
Substitutes:
GK	1	(England) Lewis Ward
DF	15	(England) Tom Parkes		(substituted in) 51'
MF	7	(England) Lee Martin
MF	22	(England) Jack Sparkes		(substituted in) 61'
MF	24	(England) Brennan Dickenson		(substituted in) 82'
MF	27	(England) Archie Collins		(substituted in) 51'
FW	14	(England) Nicky Ajose
FW	17	(England) Matt Jay
FW	35	(England) Ben Seymour
Manager:
(England) Matt Taylor

GK	25	(England) Steve Arnold
CB	5	(England) Charlie Goode
CB	6	(England) Jordan Turnbull
CB	16	(England) Scott Wharton	(yellow card) 4'
RWB	10	(Wales) Nicky Adams		(substituted off) 31'
CM	4	(Republic of Ireland) Alan McCormack		(substituted off) 75'
CM	8	(England) Ryan Watson	(yellow card) 55'	(substituted off) 88'
LWB	23	(Republic of Ireland) Michael Harriman
AM	7	(England) Sam Hoskins
CF	19	(England) Vadaine Oliver		(substituted off) 75'
CF	39	(England) Callum Morton		(substituted off) 88'
Substitutes
GK	1	(Wales) David Cornell
DF	3	(England) Joe Martin
MF	14	(England) Chris Lines
MF	20	(England) Matt Warburton
MF	21	(England) James Olayinka		(substituted in) 74'
MF	44	(England) Paul Anderson		(substituted in) 88'
MF	45	(Jamaica) Mark Marshall		(substituted in) 31'
FW	9	(England) Harry Smith		(substituted in) 74'
FW	11	(England) Andy Williams		(substituted in) 88'
Manager:
(England) Keith Curle

Man of the Match:
Callum Morton (Northampton)
Assistant referees:
George Byrne
Matthew Jones
Fourth official:
Leigh Doughty

Match rules

- 90 minutes
- 30 minutes of extra time if necessary
- Penalty shoot-out if scores still level
- Nine named substitutes
- Maximum of five substitutions, with a sixth allowed in extra time

=== Statistics ===
Statistics
	Exeter City	Northampton Town
Possession	60%	40%
Total shots	8	21
Shots on target	1	10
Corner kicks	5	7
Fouls committed	14	18
Yellow cards	1	2
Red cards	1	0

== Post-match ==
It was the highest margin of victory in a fourth tier play-off final. The Exeter City manager Taylor admitted that conceding an early goal had a negative impact on his team, noting "we started as men but quickly turned into boys". His counterpart Curle spoke of his team's supporters, saying: "we're proud, as players and football staff, to represent them". He continued: "You have to have belief, and we've got a group of players and staff that have got belief in what we are trying to do ... We've got an identity and we have to make sure we didn't navigate away from our identity. I remember a season ticket holder throwing a season ticket at me". He went on to describe what his plans were: to "have a hot chocolate, go to sleep, get up, watch the game back because that's what I do".
