= Matthew Warburton =

Matthew Warburton is the name of:

- Matty Warburton, English footballer
- Matt Warburton, American screenwriter
