= 2019–20 Northampton Town F.C. season =

Northampton Town
2019–20 season
- Chairman: Kelvin Thomas
- Manager: Keith Curle
- Stadium: Sixfields Stadium
- League Two: 7th
- Play-offs: Winners
- FA Cup: Fourth round
- EFL Cup: First round
- EFL Trophy: Second round
- Top goalscorer: League: Andy Williams; Sam Hoskins (8 each); All: Sam Hoskins (12)
- Highest home attendance: 7,798 vs Derby County
- Lowest home attendance: 2,515 vs Arsenal U21
- Average home league attendance: 5,028
Home colours	Away colours

The 2019–20 season was Northampton Town's 123rd season in their history and the second successive season in League Two. Alongside competing in League Two, the club also participated in the FA Cup, EFL Cup and EFL Trophy.

== Players ==
As of match played 29 June 2020.

No.	Name	Position	Nat.	Place of birth	Date of birth (age)	Apps	Goals	Previous club	Date signed	Fee
Goalkeepers
1	David Cornell	GK	(Wales)	Waunarlwydd	28 March 1991 (aged 29)	108	0	Oldham Athletic	21 June 2016	Free
25	Steve Arnold	GK	(England)	Welham Green	22 August 1989 (aged 30)	10	0	Shrewsbury Town	5 June 2019	Undisclosed
38	Bradley Lashley	GK	(England)	London	12 September 2000 (aged 19)	0	0	Academy	26 March 2019	N/A
Defenders
2	Reece Hall-Johnson	RB	(England)	Aylesbury	9 May 1995 (aged 25)	7	0	Grimsby Town	17 June 2019	Free
3	Joe Martin	LB	(England)	Dagenham	29 November 1988 (aged 31)	21	0	Stevenage	13 May 2019	Free
5	Charlie Goode (c)	CB	(England)	Watford	3 August 1995 (aged 24)	62	4	Scunthorpe United	3 July 2019	Undisclosed
6	Jordan Turnbull	CB	(England)	Trowbridge	30 October 1994 (aged 25)	94	5	Coventry City	11 January 2018	Add-ons
15	Jay Williams	CB	(England)	Northampton	4 October 2000 (aged 19)	17	0	Academy	8 January 2019	N/A
16	Scott Wharton	CB	(England)	Blackburn	1 October 1997 (aged 22)	43	4	Blackburn Rovers	26 July 2019	Loan
23	Michael Harriman	RB	(Republic of Ireland)	Chichester (ENG)	23 October 1992 (aged 27)	30	1	Wycombe Wanderers	4 September 2019	Free
Midfielders
4	Alan McCormack	DM	(Republic of Ireland)	Dublin	10 January 1984 (aged 36)	21	0	Luton Town	5 June 2019	Free
7	Sam Hoskins	AM	(England)	Dorchester	4 February 1993 (aged 27)	195	32	Yeovil Town	1 August 2015	Free
8	Ryan Watson	CM	(England)	Crewe	7 June 1993 (aged 27)	56	8	Milton Keynes Dons	3 June 2019	Free
10	Nicky Adams	AM	(Wales)	Bolton (ENG)	16 October 1986 (aged 33)	91	6	Bury	5 June 2019	Free
12	Scott Pollock	CM	(England)	Northampton	22 January 2001 (aged 19)	23	1	Football & Education Programme	26 March 2019	N/A
14	Chris Lines	CM	(England)	Bristol	30 November 1985 (aged 34)	39	2	Bristol Rovers	15 May 2019	Free
17	Shaun McWilliams	CM	(England)	Northampton	14 August 1998 (aged 21)	78	1	Academy	30 April 2016	N/A
20	Matt Warburton	AM	(England)	Manchester	24 May 1992 (aged 28)	28	2	Stockport County	7 May 2019	Free
22	Morgan Roberts	LM	(Wales)	Northampton (ENG)	20 December 2000 (aged 19)	10	0	Academy	17 May 2018	N/A
37	Sean Whaler	RM	(England)	Northampton	22 July 2000 (aged 19)	2	0	Academy	17 May 2018	N/A
44	Paul Anderson	RM	(England)	Melton Mowbray	23 July 1988 (aged 31)	64	8	Plymouth Argyle	18 October 2019	Free
45	Mark Marshall	W	(Jamaica)	Manchester Parish	5 May 1987 (aged 33)	8	0	Gillingham	25 January 2020	Free
Forwards
9	Harry Smith	CF	(England)	London	18 May 1995 (aged 25)	29	7	Macclesfield Town	17 May 2019	Undisclosed
11	Andy Williams	CF	(England)	Hereford	14 August 1986 (aged 33)	85	21	Doncaster Rovers	25 May 2018	Free
19	Vadaine Oliver	CF	(England)	Sheffield	21 October 1991 (aged 28)	40	8	Morecambe	3 July 2019	Free
29	Billy Waters	CF	(England)	Epsom	15 October 1994 (aged 25)	56	2	Cheltenham Town	8 June 2017	Undisclosed

== Pre-season ==
The Cobblers announced pre-season friendlies against Northampton Sileby Rangers, Brackley Town Sheffield Wednesday, Sheffield United and Milton Keynes Dons.

6 July 2019 Friendly	Northampton Sileby Rangers	0–7	Northampton Town	Moulton, Northampton
15:00 BST		Report	A.Williams 3'; J.Morias 21'; V.Oliver 59', 76', 88'; B.Waters 78'; M.Warburton 82'	Stadium: Fernie Fields

12 July 2019 Friendly	Coventry City	1–1	Northampton Town	San Pedro del Pinatar, Spain
17:00 CET	J.Allen 47'	Report	H.Smith 42'	Stadium: Pinatar Arena Football Center

16 July 2019 Friendly	Northampton Town	0–4	Sheffield Wednesday	Northampton
19:30 BST		Report	F.Forestieri 17'; S.Fletcher 44'; A.Nuhiu 59'; J.Rhodes 82'	Stadium: Sixfields Stadium; Attendance: 2,525 (1,095); Referee: Andy Woolmer

20 July 2019 Friendly	Northampton Town	0–2	Sheffield United	Northampton
15:00 BST		Report	O.Norwood 23' (pen.), 43' (pen.)	Stadium: Sixfields Stadium; Attendance: 3,825; Referee: Andy Woolmer

23 July 2019 Friendly	Brackley Town	1–0	Northampton Town	Brackley
19:45 BST	T.Daire 71'	Report		Stadium: St James Park; Attendance: 690; Referee: Oliver Mackey

26 July 2019 Friendly	Northampton Town	2–1	Milton Keynes Dons	Northampton
19:30 BST	S.Hoskins 13'; H.Smith 56'	Report	K.Agard 86'	Stadium: Sixfields Stadium; Attendance: 1,904; Referee: Kevin Friend

== Competitions ==
=== EFL League Two ===
==== League table ====
Pos	Team	Pld	W	D	L	GF	GA	GD	Pts	PPG	Promotion, qualification or relegation
3	Plymouth Argyle (P)	37	20	8	9	61	39	+22	68	1.84	Promotion to EFL League One
4	Cheltenham Town	36	17	13	6	52	27	+25	64	1.78	Qualification for League Two play-offs (Note: Four teams play for one spot and promotion to EFL League One.)
5	Exeter City	37	18	11	8	53	43	+10	65	1.76	Qualification for League Two play-offs
6	Colchester United	37	15	13	9	52	37	+15	58	1.57	Qualification for League Two play-offs
7	Northampton Town (O, P)	37	17	7	13	54	40	+14	58	1.57	Qualification for League Two play-offs
8	Port Vale	37	14	15	8	50	44	+6	57	1.54	
9	Bradford City	37	14	12	11	44	40	+4	54	1.46	
10	Forest Green Rovers	36	13	10	13	43	40	+3	49	1.36	
11	Salford City	37	13	11	13	49	46	+3	50	1.35	

Source: EFL Official Website
Rules for classification: 1) Points per game; 2) Goal difference; 3) Number of goals scored; 4) Head-to-head results; 5) Wins; 6) Away goals; 7) Penalty points (sec 9.5); 8) 12-point sending off offences
(O) Play-off winners; (P) Promoted

==== Results summary ====
Overall								Home						Away					
Pld	W	D	L	GF	GA	GD	Pts	W	D	L	GF	GA	GD	W	D	L	GF	GA	GD
37	17	7	13	54	40	+14	58	11	2	6	31	14	+17	6	5	7	23	26	−3

Last updated: 25 February 2020.

==== League position by match ====
Round	1	2	3	4	5	6	7	8	9	10	11	12	13	14	15	16	17	18	19	20	21	22	23	24	25	26	27	28	29	30	31	32	33	34	35	36	37
Ground	H	A	H	A	A	H	A	H	A	H	A	H	A	H	A	H	A	H	H	A	H	A	A	H	H	A	H	A	H	A	H	H	A	H	A	A	H
Result	L	D	L	W	L	W	L	W	W	D	D	L	L	W	W	W	D	W	W	L	W	D	L	D	W	W	W	D	W	W	L	L	L	W	L	W	L
Position	19	20	20	19	20	17	18	14	10	12	13	14	18	15	9	8	9	7	5	7	7	7	9	9	7	8	6	6	6	5	6	6	8	7	7	6	7

Updated to match(es) played on 25 February 2020. Source: BBC Sport
A = Away; H = Home; W = Win; D = Draw; L = Loss

==== Matches ====
On Thursday, 20 June 2019, the EFL League Two fixtures were revealed.

Win Draw Loss Postponed

3 August 2019 1	Northampton Town	0–1	Walsall	Northampton
15:00 BST		Report	J.Clarke 13'	Stadium: Sixfields Stadium; Attendance: 6,260 (1,455); Referee: Nick Kinseley

10 August 2019 2	Port Vale	1–1	Northampton Town	Burslem
15:00 BST	D.Amoo 26'	Report	R.Watson 45+2'	Stadium: Vale Park; Attendance: 5,931 (500); Referee: David Rock

17 August 2019 3	Northampton Town	1–2	Macclesfield Town	Northampton
15:00 BST	J.Turnbull 72'	Report	B.Stephens 39'; T.Archibald 90'	Stadium: Sixfields Stadium; Attendance: 4,319 (198); Referee: James Oldham

20 August 2019 4	Swindon Town	0–1	Northampton Town	Swindon
19:45 BST		Report	A.Williams 67'	Stadium: County Ground; Attendance: 7,203 (345); Referee: Craig Hicks

24 August 2019 5	Colchester United	1–0	Northampton Town	Colchester
15:00 BST	L.Norris 66' (pen.)	Report		Stadium: Colchester Community Stadium; Attendance: 3,164 (428); Referee: Ollie Yates

31 August 2019 6	Northampton Town	3–1	Plymouth Argyle	Northampton
15:00 BST	R.Watson 7' (pen.); A.Williams 21', 41'	Report	J.Riley 10'	Stadium: Sixfields Stadium; Attendance: 5,535 (1,291); Referee: Seb Stockbridge

7 September 2019 7	Bradford City	2–1	Northampton Town	Bradford
15:00 BST	M.Harriman 77' (o.g.); P.O'Connor 88'; Z.Ismail (red card) 90+2'	Report	C.Goode 20'	Stadium: Valley Parade; Attendance: 13,678; Referee: Leigh Doughty

14 September 2019 8	Northampton Town	2–0	Newport County	Northampton
15:00 BST	A.Williams 5'; S.Hoskins 72'	Report	J.Matt (red card) 90'	Stadium: Sixfields Stadium; Attendance: 4,616 (289); Referee: Alan Young

17 September 2019 9	Stevenage	0–1	Northampton Town	Stevenage
19:45 BST		Report	H.Smith 56' (red card) 68'	Stadium: Broadhall Way; Attendance: 2,877 (460); Referee: Charles Breakspear

21 September 2019 10	Northampton Town	2–2	Crawley Town	Northampton
15:00 BST	C.Lines 15' (pen.) (penalty missed) 50'; S.McWilliams 64'	Report	A.Nathaniel-George 70'; J.Martin 90+5' (o.g.)	Stadium: Sixfields Stadium; Attendance: 5,121 (233); Referee: Andy Haines

28 September 2019 11	Morecambe	2–2	Northampton Town	Morecambe
15:00 BST	A.Buxton 72'; K.Ellison 90+3'	Report	J.Turnbull 21', 37'	Stadium: Globe Arena; Attendance: 2,245 (318); Referee: Martin Coy

5 October 2019 12	Northampton Town	0–1	Leyton Orient	Northampton
15:00 BST		Report	J.Brophy 57'	Stadium: Sixfields Stadium; Attendance: 5,419 (960); Referee: Tony Harrington

12 October 2019 13	Scunthorpe United	3–0	Northampton Town	Scunthorpe
15:00 BST	L.Novak 11', 14'; K.Van Veen 31'	Report	V.Oliver (red card) 53'	Stadium: Glanford Park; Attendance: 3,377; Referee: Trevor Kettle

19 October 2019 14	Northampton Town	2–0	Salford City	Northampton
15:00 BST	S.Hoskins 35' (pen.); J.Turnbull 66'	Report		Stadium: Sixfields Stadium; Attendance: 4,886 (151); Referee: Lee Swabey

22 October 2019 15	Carlisle United	0–2	Northampton Town	Carlisle
19:45 BST		Report	S.Pollock 51'; S.Hoskins 90+2'	Stadium: Brunton Park; Attendance: 3,324 (176); Referee: Scott Oldham

26 October 2019 16	Northampton Town	2–0	Cambridge United	Northampton
15:00 BST	H.Smith 26'; G.Taft 45+1' (o.g.)	Report		Stadium: Sixfields Stadium; Attendance: 5,221 (694); Referee: Graham Salisbury

2 November 2019 17	Oldham Athletic	2–2	Northampton Town	Oldham
15:00 GMT	S.Wilson 85'; J.Smith 89'	Report	M.Warburton 6'; A.Williams 80'	Stadium: Boundary Park; Attendance: 3,274 (373); Referee: Peter Wright

16 November 2019 18	Northampton Town	4–1	Crewe Alexandra	Northampton
15:00 GMT	S.Wharton 10', 18'; S.Hoskins 24' (pen.); A.Williams 56'	Report	C.Porter 37'	Stadium: Sixfields Stadium; Attendance: 5,236 (522); Referee: Craig Hicks

23 November 2019 19	Northampton Town	2–0	Grimsby Town	Northampton
15:00 GMT	S.Wharton 25'; V.Oliver 41'	Report		Stadium: Sixfields Stadium; Attendance: 5,211 (597); Referee: Andy Haines

7 December 2019 20	Exeter City	3–2	Northampton Town	Exeter
15:00 GMT	R.Williams 38'; A.Martin 64'; A.Fisher 66'	Report	C.Goode 33'; S.Hoskins 79'	Stadium: St James Park; Attendance: 3,971 (247); Referee: Neil Hair

14 December 2019 21	Northampton Town	1–0	Forest Green Rovers	Northampton
15:00 GMT	M.Mills 45' (o.g.)	Report		Stadium: Sixfields Stadium; Attendance: 4,534 (139); Referee: Anthony Coggins

21 December 2019 22	Mansfield Town	1–1	Northampton Town	Mansfield
15:00 GMT	A.Cook 74'	Report	H.Smith 84'	Stadium: Field Mill; Attendance: 4,496 (474); Referee: Alan Young

26 December 2019 23	Crawley Town	4–0	Northampton Town	Crawley
15:00 GMT	N.Ferguson 27'; B.Lubala 62'; O.Palmer 80'; M.Bloomfield 84'	Report		Stadium: Broadfield Stadium; Attendance: 2,190 (430); Referee: Sam Purkiss

29 December 2019 24	Northampton Town	1–1	Cheltenham Town	Northampton
15:00 GMT	J.Turnbull 38'	Report	C.Thomas 3' (pen.); A.Addai (red card) 90+6'	Stadium: Sixfields Stadium; Attendance: 5,090 (367); Referee: Carl Boyeson

1 January 2020 25	Northampton Town	1–0	Stevenage	Northampton
15:00 GMT	A.Williams 90+4'	Report		Stadium: Sixfields Stadium; Attendance: 4,613 (252); Referee: Trevor Kettle

11 January 2020 26	Salford City	1–2	Northampton Town	Salford
15:00 GMT	J.Baldwin 20'	Report	S.Hoskins 29'; A.Williams 63'	Stadium: Moor Lane; Attendance: 2,919 (1,066); Referee: Ross Joyce

18 January 2020 27	Northampton Town	4–1	Morecambe	Northampton
15:00 GMT	P.Anderson 28'; R.Watson 45+1'; N.Adams 55'; C.Lines 75'	Report	A.Phillips 64'	Stadium: Sixfields Stadium; Attendance: 4,761 (105); Referee: Graham Salisbury

21 January 2020 28	Leyton Orient	1–1	Northampton Town	Leyton, London
19:45 GMT	J.Wright 85' (pen.); J.Dayton (red card) 89'	Report	R.Watson 43'; S.Wharton (red card) 88'	Stadium: Brisbane Road; Attendance: 3,774 (380); Referee: Alan Young

28 January 2020 29	Northampton Town	3–0	Scunthorpe United	Northampton
19:45 GMT	V.Oliver 7', 62'; S.Hoskins 70' (pen.)	Report	K.Van Veen (red card) 36'	Stadium: Sixfields Stadium; Attendance: 4,038 (181); Referee: Sam Purkiss

1 February 2020 30	Macclesfield Town	0–1	Northampton Town	Macclesfield
15:00 GMT		Report	C.Morton 59'	Stadium: Moss Rose; Attendance: 1,712 (475); Referee: John Busby

8 February 2020 31	Northampton Town	0–1	Port Vale	Northampton
15:00 GMT		Report	D.Worrall 72'	Stadium: Sixfields Stadium; Attendance: 5,583 (461); Referee: Charles Breakspear

11 February 2020 32	Northampton Town	0–1	Swindon Town	Northampton
19:45 GMT		Report	J.Lyden 77'	Stadium: Sixfields Stadium; Attendance: 5,759 (1,319); Referee: Tom Nield

15 February 2020 33	Walsall	3–2	Northampton Town	Walsall
15:00 GMT	J.Gordon 55'; D.Guthrie 77'; R.Holden 90+3'	Report	C.Morton 21', 39'	Stadium: Bescot Stadium; Attendance: 4,541 (867); Referee: Ben Toner

22 February 2020 34	Northampton Town	2–0	Exeter City	Northampton
15:00 GMT	V.Oliver 1'; S.Hoskins 81' (pen.)	Report		Stadium: Sixfields Stadium; Attendance: 5,046 (402); Referee: Martin Coy

25 February 2020 35	Cheltenham Town	2–1	Northampton Town	Cheltenham
19:45 GMT	R.Broom 19'; L.Varney 85'	Report	R.Watson 3'	Stadium: Whaddon Road; Attendance: 2,934 (276); Referee: Craig Hicks

29 February 2020 36	Grimsby Town	0–3	Northampton Town	Cleethorpes
15:00 GMT		Report	C.Goode 9'; C.Morton 26', 82'	Stadium: Blundell Park; Attendance: 4,879 (303); Referee: Christopher Pollard

7 March 2020 37	Northampton Town	1–2	Mansfield Town	Northampton
15:00 GMT	S.Hoskins (red card) 10'; H.Smith 90+5'	Report	D.CRose 12' (pen.); W.Tomlinson 74'	Stadium: Sixfields Stadium; Attendance: 5,666 (767); Referee: Peter Wright

14 March 2020	Forest Green Rovers	v	Northampton Town	Nailsworth
15:00 GMT				Stadium: The New Lawn
Note: Season was suspended until 3 April 2020, due to the COVID-19 pandemic.

17 March 2020	Northampton Town	v	Carlisle United	Northampton
19:45 GMT				Stadium: PTS Academy Stadium
Note: Season was suspended until 3 April 2020, due to the COVID-19 pandemic.

21 March 2020	Cambridge United	v	Northampton Town	Cambridge
15:00 GMT				Stadium: Abbey Stadium
Note: Season was suspended until 3 April 2020, due to the COVID-19 pandemic.

28 March 2020	Northampton Town	v	Oldham Athletic	Northampton
15:00 GMT				Stadium: PTS Academy Stadium
Note: Season was suspended until 3 April 2020, due to the COVID-19 pandemic.

4 April 2020	Crewe Alexandra	v	Northampton Town	Crewe
15:00 BST				Stadium: Alexandra Stadium
Note: On 3 April, the English Football League decided to postpone all football until safe to do so due to the COVID-19 pandemic.

10 April 2020	Northampton Town	v	Colchester United	Northampton
15:00 BST				Stadium: PTS Academy Stadium
Note: On 3 April, the English Football League decided to postpone all football until safe to do so due to the COVID-19 pandemic.

13 April 2020	Plymouth Argyle	v	Northampton Town	Plymouth
15:00 BST				Stadium: Home Park
Note: On 3 April, the English Football League decided to postpone all football until safe to do so due to the COVID-19 pandemic.

18 April 2020	Northampton Town	v	Bradford City	Northampton
15:00 BST				Stadium: Sixfields Stadium
Note: On 3 April, the English Football League decided to postpone all football until safe to do so due to the COVID-19 pandemic.

25 April 2020	Newport County	v	Northampton Town	Newport
15:00 BST				Stadium: Rodney Parade
Note: On 3 April, the English Football League decided to postpone all football until safe to do so due to the COVID-19 pandemic.

==== Play-offs ====
On 9 June 2020, League Two clubs voted by an overwhelming majority to curtail the 2019–20 season early due to the COVID-19 pandemic in the United Kingdom. It was announced the same day that the play-offs would still be played and that positions would be determined on a points per game (PPG) basis. This meant that Northampton Town finished 7th in the League Two table, thus occupying the final play-off spot.

18 June 2020 Semi Final 1st Leg	Northampton Town	0–2	Cheltenham Town	Northampton
19:45 BST		Report	C.Raglan 26'; C.Thomas 86'	Stadium: Sixfields Stadium; Attendance: 0 Referee: Marc Edwards
Note: Live on Sky Sports

22 June 2020 Semi Final 2nd Leg	Cheltenham Town	0–3 (2–3 agg.)	Northampton Town	Cheltenham
20:00 BST		Report	V.Oliver 9'; C.Morton 57', 77'	Stadium: Whaddon Road; Attendance: 0 Referee: Leigh Doughty
Note: Live on Sky Sports

29 June 2020 Final	Exeter City	0–4	Northampton Town	Wembley, London
19:30 BST	D.Moxey (red card) 59'	Report	R.Watson 11'; C.Morton 31'; S.Hoskins 80'; A.Williams 89'	Stadium: Wembley Stadium; Attendance: 0 Referee: Michael Salisbury
Note: Live on Sky Sports

=== FA Cup ===
The first round draw was made on 21 October 2019. The second round draw was made on 11 November 2019. The third round draw was made live on BBC Two from Etihad Stadium, Micah Richards and Tony Adams conducted the draw. The fourth round draw was made by Alex Scott and David O'Leary on Monday, 6 January.

10 November 2019 First round	Chippenham Town	0–3	Northampton Town	Chippenham
12:45 GMT		Report	H.Smith 22'; V.Oliver 26', 45+3'	Stadium: Hardenhuish Park; Attendance: 2,625 (744); Referee: Christopher Pollard

1 December 2019 Second round	Northampton Town	3–1	Notts County	Northampton
14:00 GMT	S.Wharton 3'; V.Oliver 25'; H.Smith 76'	Report	K.Dennis 84'	Stadium: Sixfields Stadium; Attendance: 4,489 (1,041); Referee: Paul Marsden

5 January 2020 Third round	Burton Albion	2–4	Northampton Town	Burton upon Trent
14:01 GMT	R.Edwards 45+2'; S.Fraser 90+1'	Report	N.Adams 10'; R.Watson 23'; C.Goode 45+1'; S.Hoskins 70'	Stadium: Pirelli Stadium; Attendance: 3,810 (1,483); Referee: Jeremy Simpson

24 January 2020 Fourth round	Northampton Town	0–0	Derby County	Northampton
20:00 GMT		Report		Stadium: Sixfields Stadium; Attendance: 7,798 (1,439); Referee: Darren England
Note: Live on BT Sport

4 February 2020 Fourth round (R)	Derby County	4–2	Northampton Town	Derby
19:45 GMT	A.Wisdom 28'; D.Holmes 35'; J.Marriott 51'; W.Rooney 77' (pen.)	Report	N.Adams 47'; S.Hoskins 84' (pen.)	Stadium: Pride Park; Attendance: 15,860 (4,442); Referee: David Webb

=== EFL Cup ===
The first round draw was made on 20 June.

13 August 2019 First round	Swansea City	3–1	Northampton Town	Swansea
19:45 BST	A.Ayew 80', 88'; G.Byers 83'	Report	M.Warburton 61'	Stadium: Liberty Stadium; Referee: Kevin Johnson

=== EFL Trophy ===
On 9 July 2019, the pre-determined group stage draw was announced with Invited clubs to be drawn on 12 July 2019. The draw for the second round was made on 16 November 2019 live on Sky Sports.

Pos	Div	Team	Pld	W	PW	PL	L	GF	GA	GD	Pts	Qualification
1	L1	Peterborough United	3	3	0	0	0	5	1	+4	9	Advance to Round 2
2	L2	Northampton Town	3	1	1	0	1	2	3	−1	5	Advance to Round 2
3	ACA	Arsenal U21	3	0	1	1	1	2	3	−1	3	
4	L2	Cambridge United	3	0	0	1	2	2	4	−2	1	

Source: EFL.com

27 August 2019 South Group H	Northampton Town	1–1 (4–3 p)	Arsenal U21	Northampton
19:30 BST	S.Hoskins 82'	Report	T.Omole (red card) 61'; J.Olayinka 78'	Stadium: Sixfields Stadium; Attendance: 2,515 (599); Referee: Robert Lewis
	Penalties
	S.Hoskins (penalty scored); S.McWilliams (penalty scored); R.Watson (penalty scored); B.Waters (penalty scored); C.Goode (penalty missed)		T.Coyle (penalty missed); R.Burton (penalty scored); N.Tormey (penalty scored); F.Balogun (penalty scored); E.Smith Rowe (penalty missed)

3 September 2019 South Group H	Northampton Town	0–2	Peterborough United	Northampton
19:30 BST		Report	I.Kanu 21'; S.Dembele 24'	Stadium: Sixfields Stadium; Attendance: 2,234 (553); Referee: Josh Smith

8 October 2019 South Group H	Cambridge United	0–1	Northampton Town	Cambridge
19:30 BST		Report	H.Smith 17'	Stadium: Abbey Stadium; Attendance: 764 (90); Referee: Sam Purkiss

3 December 2019 Second round	Portsmouth	2–1	Northampton Town	Milton
19:45 GMT	L.Maloney 39'; M.Harness 62'	Report	M.Harriman 12'	Stadium: Fratton Park; Attendance: 2,413 (90)

=== Appearances, goals and cards ===
No.	Pos	Player	League Two			FA Cup			EFL Cup			EFL Trophy			Play-offs			Total			Discipline	
No.	Pos	Player	Starts	Sub	Goals	Starts	Sub	Goals	Starts	Sub	Goals	Starts	Sub	Goals	Starts	Sub	Goals	Starts	Sub	Goals	Booked	Sent off (straight red)
1	GK	David Cornell	33	1	–	3	–	–	1	–	–	–	–	–	–	–	–	37	1	–	3	–
2	RB	Reece Hall-Johnson	4	1	–	–	–	–	–	–	–	2	–	–	–	–	–	6	1	–	1	–
3	LB	Joe Martin	13	4	–	–	1	–	–	–	–	2	–	–	–	1	–	15	6	–	4	–
4	DM	Alan McCormack	11	4	–	2	–	–	–	–	–	–	1	–	3	–	–	16	5	–	8	–
5	CB	Charlie Goode	36	–	3	5	–	1	–	–	–	1	–	–	3	–	–	45	–	4	9	–
6	CB	Jordan Turnbull	31	–	5	4	–	–	1	–	–	3	–	–	3	–	–	42	–	5	11	–
7	AM	Sam Hoskins	36	1	8	4	–	2	1	–	–	1	2	1	2	–	1	44	3	12	9	1
8	CM	Ryan Watson	21	4	5	3	1	1	1	–	–	3	–	–	3	–	1	31	5	7	5	–
9	ST	Harry Smith	7	12	4	1	1	2	–	1	–	4	–	1	–	3	–	12	17	7	3	1
10	AM	Nicky Adams	37	–	1	5	–	2	–	–	–	1	–	–	3	–	–	46	–	3	2	–
11	ST	Andy Williams	20	12	8	4	–	–	1	–	–	1	1	–	–	2	1	26	15	9	1	–
14	CM	Chris Lines	25	6	2	5	–	–	–	1	–	1	1	–	–	–	–	31	8	2	5	–
16	CB	Scott Wharton	30	2	3	4	–	1	1	–	–	3	–	–	3	–	–	41	2	4	8	1
17	CM	Shaun McWilliams	13	4	1	–	–	–	1	–	–	4	–	–	–	–	–	18	4	1	3	–
19	ST	Vadaine Oliver	19	11	4	5	–	3	–	–	–	–	2	–	3	–	1	27	13	8	5	1
20	AM	Matt Warburton	8	10	1	1	4	–	1	–	1	4	–	–	–	–	–	14	14	2	1	–
21	CM	James Olayinka	1	–	–	–	–	–	–	–	–	–	–	–	1	2	–	2	2	–	1	–
23	RB	Michael Harriman	15	6	–	2	2	–	–	–	–	2	–	1	3	–	–	22	8	1	3	–
25	GK	Steve Arnold	4	–	–	2	–	–	–	–	–	1	–	–	3	–	–	10	–	–	–	–
33	CB	Lloyd Jones	6	1	–	–	–	–	–	–	–	–	–	–	–	–	–	6	1	–	2	–
39	ST	Callum Morton	7	2	5	–	–	–	–	–	–	–	–	–	3	–	3	10	2	8	2	–
44	AM	Paul Anderson	17	1	1	5	–	–	–	–	–	–	–	–	–	2	–	22	3	1	6	–
45	W	Mark Marshall	5	2	–	–	–	–	–	–	–	–	–	–	–	1	–	5	3	–	–	–
Youth team scholars:
12	CM	Scott Pollock	3	8	1	–	4	–	–	–	–	3	–	–	–	–	–	6	12	1	1	–
15	CB	Jay Williams	–	–	–	–	–	–	1	–	–	1	1	–	–	–	–	2	1	–	–	–
18	ST	Michael Harding	–	–	–	–	–	–	–	–	–	–	1	–	–	–	–	–	1	–	–	–
22	LM	Morgan Roberts	–	1	–	–	1	–	–	1	–	–	2	–	–	–	–	–	5	–	–	–
24	CB	Ryan Hughes	–	–	–	–	–	–	–	–	–	–	–	–	–	–	–	–	–	–	–	–
27	RB	Camron McWilliams	–	–	–	–	–	–	–	–	–	–	–	–	–	–	–	–	–	–	–	–
28	CM	Jack Newell	–	–	–	–	–	–	–	–	–	–	–	–	–	–	–	–	–	–	–	–
30	ST	Caleb Chukwuemeka	–	–	–	–	–	–	–	–	–	–	–	–	–	–	–	–	–	–	–	–
31	ST	Ethan Johnston	–	–	–	–	–	–	–	–	–	–	–	–	–	–	–	–	–	–	–	–
37	RM	Sean Whaler	–	–	–	–	–	–	–	–	–	–	–	–	–	–	–	–	–	–	–	–
38	GK	Bradley Lashley	–	–	–	–	–	–	–	–	–	–	–	–	–	–	–	–	–	–	–	–
Players no longer at the club:
21	W	Egli Kaja	–	4	–	–	–	–	–	–	–	–	–	–	–	–	–	–	4	–	–	–
29	ST	Billy Waters	2	5	–	–	1	–	1	–	–	3	1	–	–	–	–	6	7	–	2	–
30	ST	Junior Morias	–	2	–	–	–	–	–	–	–	–	–	–	–	–	–	–	2	–	–	–
33	GK	Andy Fisher	–	–	–	–	–	–	–	–	–	3	–	–	–	–	–	3	–	–	–	–
39	LB	Joe Bunney	3	1	–	–	–	–	1	–	–	1	–	–	–	–	–	5	1	–	4	–

== Awards ==
=== Club awards ===
At the end of the season, Northampton's annual award ceremony, including categories voted for by the players and backroom staff, the supporters, will see the players recognised for their achievements for the club throughout the 2019–20 season.

Player of the Year Award	Charlie Goode
Academy Player of the Year Award	Haydn Price
Goal of the Season Award	Chris Lines (vs. Morecambe)

=== Divisional awards ===
Date	Nation	Winner	Award
February 2020	(England)	Callum Morton	Football League Two Player of the Month
Season	(England)	Charlie Goode	PFA League Two Team of the Year
Season	(Wales)	Nicky Adams	PFA League Two Team of the Year

== Transfers ==
=== Transfers in ===
Date from	Position	Nationality	Name	From	Fee	Ref.
1 July 2019	AM	(Wales)	Nicky Adams	(England) Bury	Free transfer	
1 July 2019	GK	(England)	Steve Arnold	(England) Shrewsbury Town	Undisclosed	
1 July 2019	RB	(England)	Reece Hall-Johnson	(England) Grimsby Town	Free transfer	
1 July 2019	CM	(England)	Chris Lines	(England) Bristol Rovers	Free transfer	
1 July 2019	LB	(England)	Joe Martin	(England) Stevenage	Free transfer	
1 July 2019	DM	(Republic of Ireland)	Alan McCormack	(England) Luton Town	Free transfer	
1 July 2019	CF	(England)	Harry Smith	(England) Macclesfield Town	Undisclosed	
1 July 2019	AM	(England)	Matt Warburton	(England) Stockport County	Free transfer	
1 July 2019	CM	(England)	Ryan Watson	(England) Milton Keynes Dons	Free transfer	
3 July 2019	CB	(England)	Charlie Goode	(England) Scunthorpe United	Undisclosed	
3 July 2019	CF	(England)	Vadaine Oliver	(England) Morecambe	Free transfer	
2 September 2019	RW	(Albania)	Egli Kaja	Free agent	Free transfer	
4 September 2019	RB	(Republic of Ireland)	Michael Harriman	Free agent	Free transfer	
18 October 2019	RM	(England)	Paul Anderson	Free agent	Free transfer	
25 January 2020	RW	(Jamaica)	Mark Marshall	Free agent	Free transfer	

=== Loans in ===
Date from	Position	Nationality	Name	From	Date until	Ref.
26 July 2019	CB	(England)	Scott Wharton	(England) Blackburn Rovers	30 June 2020	
23 August 2019	GK	(England)	Andy Fisher	(England) Blackburn Rovers	1 January 2020	
27 January 2020	CF	(England)	Callum Morton	(England) West Bromwich Albion	30 June 2020	
27 January 2020	CM	(England)	James Olayinka	(England) Arsenal	30 June 2020	
31 January 2020	CB	(England)	Lloyd Jones	(England) Luton Town	30 June 2020	

=== Transfers out ===
Date from	Position	Nationality	Name	To	Fee	Ref.
1 July 2019	AM	(England)	Dean Bowditch	Free agent	Released	
1 July 2019	AM	(England)	Jack Bridge	(England) Carlisle United	Released	
1 July 2019	LB	(Northern Ireland)	David Buchanan	(England) Chesterfield	Released	
1 July 2019	FW	(England)	Jack Daldy	Free agent	Released	
1 July 2019	GK	(England)	Luke Coddington	(England) Chesterfield	Released	
1 July 2019	RB	(England)	Shay Facey	(England) Walsall	Released	
1 July 2019	CM	(Republic of Ireland)	Sam Foley	(Scotland) St Mirren	Released	
1 July 2019	GK	(England)	James Goff	Free agent	Released	
1 July 2019	CF	(England)	Joe Iaciofano	(England) St Albans City	Released	
1 July 2019	CM	(Republic of Ireland)	John-Joe O'Toole	(England) Burton Albion	Rejected option	
1 July 2019	CB	(Grenada)	Aaron Pierre	(England) Shrewsbury Town	Undisclosed	
1 July 2019	W	(England)	Daniel Powell	(England) Crewe Alexandra	Contract rejected	
1 July 2019	CB	(Wales)	Ash Taylor	(Scotland) Aberdeen	Mutual consent	
22 August 2019	CF	(Jamaica)	Junior Morias	(Scotland) St Mirren	Undisclosed	
2 September 2019	LB	(England)	Joe Bunney	(England) Bolton Wanderers	Mutual Consent	

=== Loans out ===
Date from	Position	Nationality	Name	To	Date until	Ref.
9 August 2019	MF	(England)	Jack Newell	(England) Redditch United	September 2019	
27 September 2019	CB	(England)	Jay Williams	(England) Ketteting Town		
11 October 2019	CB	(England)	Ryan Hughes	(England) AFC Rushden & Diamonds	November 2019	
11 October 2019	LM	(England)	Morgan Roberts	(England) AFC Rushden & Diamonds	November 2019	
1 November 2019	RB	(England)	Camron McWilliams	(England) St Ives Town	December 2019	
5 November 2019	GK	(England)	Bradley Lashley	(England) Daventry Town	December 2019	
12 November 2019	LM	(England)	Morgan Roberts	(England) Banbury United	December 2019	
13 December 2019	CB	(England)	Jay Williams	(England) Kettering Town	8 January 2020	
7 January 2020	SS	(England)	Billy Waters	(Wales) Newport County	30 June 2020	
9 January 2020	CB	(England)	Ryan Hughes	(England) Banbury United	February 2020	
6 March 2020	CB	(England)	Ryan Hughes	(England) Corby Town	April 2020	
13 March 2020	CM	(England)	Camron McWilliams	(England) Corby Town	April 2020	
