= Lloyd Jones (English footballer) =

English footballer (born 1995)

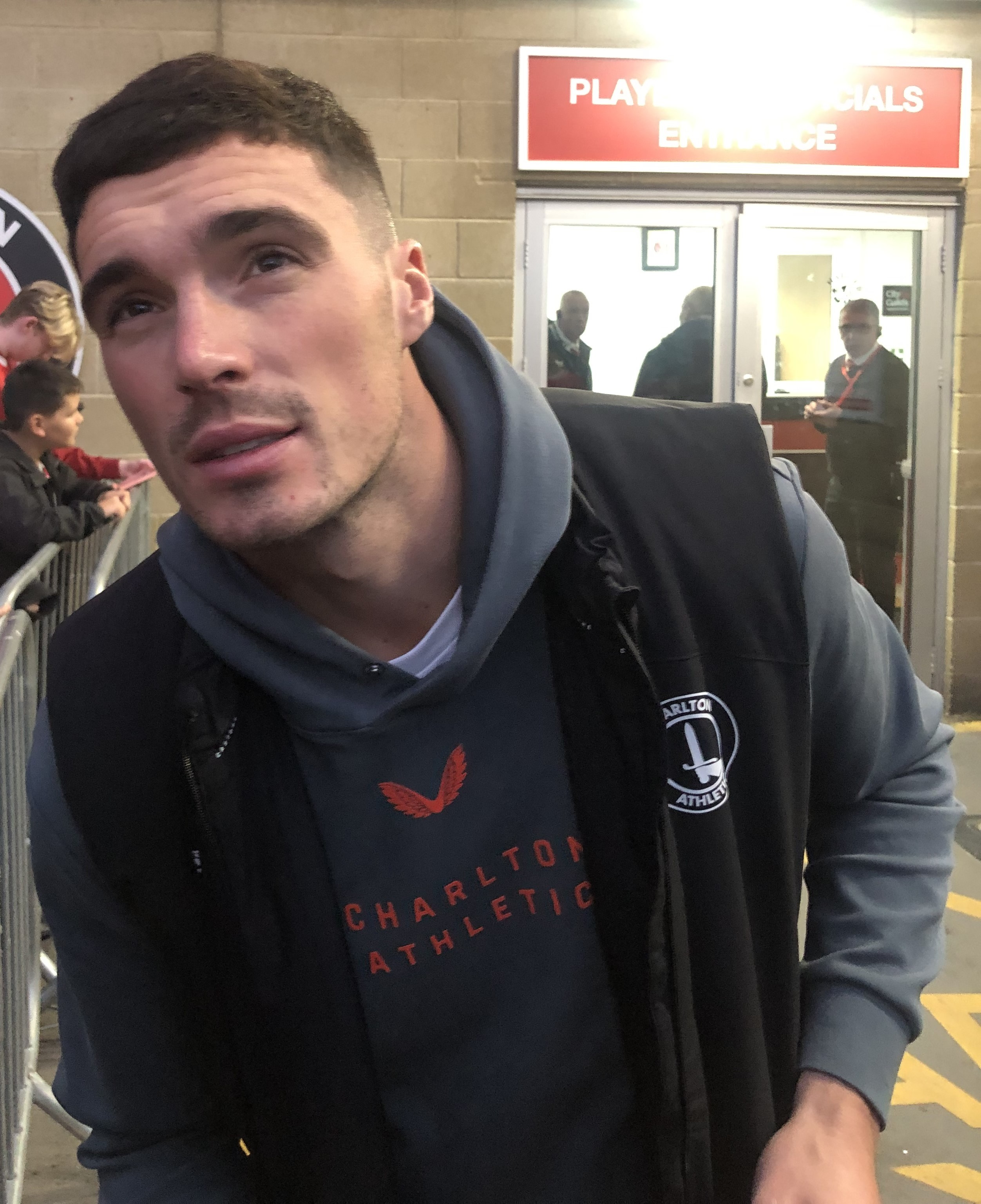
- Jones in 2024

Personal information
- Full name: Lloyd Richard Jones
- Date of birth: 7 October 1995 (age 31)
- Place of birth: Southend, England
- Height: 6 ft 3 in (1.91 m)
- Position: Defender

Team information
- Current team: Charlton Athletic
- Number: 5

Youth career
- 2006–2011: Plymouth Argyle
- 2011–2014: Liverpool

Senior career*
Years	Team	Apps	(Gls)
2013–2018	Liverpool	0	(0)
2015	→ Cheltenham Town (loan)	6	(0)
2015	→ Accrington Stanley (loan)	11	(1)
2015–2016	→ Blackpool (loan)	10	(0)
2016–2017	→ Swindon Town (loan)	24	(2)
2018–2020	Luton Town	6	(0)
2019	→ Plymouth Argyle (loan)	9	(1)
2020	→ Northampton Town (loan)	7	(0)
2020–2021	Northampton Town	27	(0)
2021–2023	Cambridge United	61	(4)
2023–	Charlton Athletic	128	(8)

International career^{‡}
2011–2012	Wales U17	11	(1)
2012	Wales U19	1	(0)
2014	England U19	3	(0)
2014	England U20	4	(0)
- * Club domestic league appearances and goals as of 22:10, 3 November 2026 (UTC) ‡ National team caps and goals as of 15:10, 11 September 2025 (UTC)

Lloyd Richard Jones (born 7 October 1995) is an English professional footballer who plays as a defender for and captains EFL Championship club Charlton Athletic.

== Club career ==
=== Liverpool ===
Liverpool signed Lloyd Jones in May 2011 from Plymouth Argyle for a sum of £20,000

The large figure of Jones quickly became a regular starter for Liverpool's Under-21 squad during the 2012–13 season. He was rewarded with his good performances by earning a call up to the senior squad on 12 May 2013 for Liverpool's Premier League encounter against Fulham. He was an unused substitute in the 3–1 victory for Liverpool.

In July 2013, he signed a three-year professional deal with the club. Jones captained the Reserve team for the latter part of the 2013–14 campaign and throughout the 2014–15 season.

==== Various loan spells ====
On 1 January 2015, Lloyd Jones signed a six-week loan deal with Cheltenham Town along with fellow reserve teammates Kevin Stewart and Jack Dunn. He made his Cheltenham, and senior debut, on 3 January in a League Two match against Oxford United which saw Cheltenham win 2–1.

On 12 March 2015, Jones joined Accrington Stanley on a six weeks loan. On 3 August 2015, Jones signed a season long loan with Blackpool. On 30 September 2015, he suffered a serious injury, injuring both his knee and ankle in the same tackle, and was out for 6 months.

On 6 August 2016, Jones signed new 2-year contract with Liverpool and on the same day, he was loaned to Swindon Town.

=== Luton Town ===
On 31 January 2018, Jones joined Luton Town for an undisclosed fee. He returned to Luton's League One rivals Plymouth Argyle on 31 January 2019 on loan until the end of 2018–19.

=== Northampton Town ===
Jones was loaned to League Two club Northampton Town on 31 January 2020 until the end of the 2019–20 season. His debut came a day later in a 1–0 win away to Macclesfield Town, which manager Keith Curle described as "a very solid performance".

He made seven appearances by the time the season was suspended because of the COVID-19 pandemic in England. Northampton finished in seventh place on points per game, but with his Luton contract expiring at the end of June and another club showing an interest in signing him, Jones chose not to participate in the play-offs to avoid an injury. However, the proposed move fell through and Jones failed to find a club in the summer transfer window.

Northampton were promoted to League One with victory in the 2020 League Two play-off final, and Jones returned to the club in October to train with them. As a result of English Football League rules restricting clubs in League One to 22-man squads, Northampton could only offer Jones a contract in December, after they were able to remove another player from their squad list.

He re-signed for the club on 29 December on a contract until the end of the season. His first appearance after returning came later that day in a 3–1 home win over Gillingham, a result that ended a run of four consecutive defeats. After making six successive league starts and helping the team keep three clean sheets, manager Curle praised Jones' efforts to win back his trust. However, Northampton lost their next match 1–0 at home to Wigan Athletic, resulting in Curle being dismissed a day later with the club in 23rd place, and was replaced by caretaker manager Jon Brady.

Jones had played every minute of Northampton's 16 league matches since rejoining the club by mid-March 2021, with the team keeping seven clean sheets, and was named as captain by Brady for the first time in a 2–1 away defeat to Charlton Athletic on 9 March.

=== Cambridge United ===
On 8 June 2021, Jones signed for newly promoted Cambridge United.

=== Charlton Athletic ===
On 30 June 2023, Jones signed for Charlton Athletic on a two-year deal. On 28 January 2025, Jones signed a new two-and-a-half year contract, keeping him at the club until the summer of 2027. Jones helped Charlton keep a club record 23 clean sheets in their promotion winning 2024–25 season, and was awarded Charlton's Player of the Year.

Jones picked up the award for a second consecutive season having helped the club to survival in their first season back in the Championship. Jones was one of two players (alongside Sonny Carey) who completed the season as an ever-present, having played in all 46 of Charlton's league matches.

On 14 August 2026, Jones signed a new two-year contract, keeping him at the club until the summer of 2028.

== International career ==
Jones is eligible to represent his birth country England as well as Wales through his Welsh father. He made eleven appearances for the Welsh under-17s scoring once. He earned one cap for the Welsh U19s before switching allegiance to England in October 2013, having rejected a call-up to the Welsh U21s.

He got called up for the England U19s for their 2014 UEFA European Under-19 Championship elite qualification matches in May 2014. Jones featured in all three matches. Four months later he made his debut for the U20s in a friendly against Romania. He has played four times for the U20s.

== Personal life ==
Jones featured as a contestant on the 2024 Peacock reality dating show, Love Undercover. In 2025 he started dating Love Island's Ella Thomas.

== Career statistics ==
As of match played 3 November 2026

Appearances and goals by club, season and competition
Club	Season	League			FA Cup		League Cup		Other		Total	
Club	Season	Division	Apps	Goals	Apps	Goals	Apps	Goals	Apps	Goals	Apps	Goals
Liverpool	2013–14	Premier League	0	0	0	0	0	0	0	0	0	0
Liverpool	2014–15	Premier League	0	0	0	0	0	0	0	0	0	0
Liverpool	2015–16	Premier League	0	0	—		—		—		0	0
Liverpool	2016–17	Premier League	0	0	—		—		—		0	0
Liverpool	2017–18	Premier League	0	0	0	0	0	0	0	0	0	0
Liverpool	Total		0	0	0	0	0	0	0	0	0	0
Cheltenham Town (loan)	2014–15	League Two	6	0	—		—		—		6	0
Accrington Stanley (loan)	2014–15	League Two	11	1	—		—		—		11	1
Blackpool (loan)	2015–16	League One	10	0	0	0	1	0	0	0	11	0
Swindon Town (loan)	2016–17	League One	24	2	2	0	1	0	2 (Note: Appearances in EFL Trophy)	0	29	2
Luton Town	2017–18	League Two	1	0	—		—		—		1	0
Luton Town	2018–19	League One	1	0	0	0	1	0	3	0	5	0
Luton Town	2019–20	Championship	4	0	1	0	3	1	—		8	1
Luton Town	Total		6	0	1	0	4	1	3	0	14	1
Plymouth Argyle (loan)	2018–19	League One	9	1	—		—		—		9	1
Northampton Town (loan)	2019–20	League Two	7	0	—		—		0	0	7	0
Northampton Town	2020–21	League One	27	0	—		—		0	0	27	0
Northampton Town	Total		34	0	—		—		0	0	34	0
Cambridge United	2021–22	League One	25	0	0	0	2	0	1	0	28	0
Cambridge United	2022–23	League One	36	4	3	0	1	0	1	0	41	4
Cambridge United	Total		61	4	3	0	3	0	2	0	69	4
Charlton Athletic	2023–24	League One	32	2	2	0	0	0	2	0	36	2
Charlton Athletic	2024–25	League One	36	3	1	0	1	0	3 (Note: Appearance in the League One play-offs.)	0	41	3
Charlton Athletic	2025–26	Championship	46	1	1	0	0	0	—		47	1
Charlton Athletic	2026–27	Championship	14	2	0	0	2	1	—		16	3
Charlton Athletic	Total		128	8	4	0	3	1	5	0	140	9
Career total			289	16	10	0	12	2	12	0	323	18

== Honours ==
Charlton Athletic

- EFL League One play-offs: 2025

Individual

- Cambridge United Player of the Year: 2022–23
- EFL League One Team of the Season: 2024–25
- Charlton Athletic Player of the Year: 2024–25, 2025–26
- PFA Team of the Year: 2024–25 League One
