= Charlie Goode =

English footballer (born 1995)

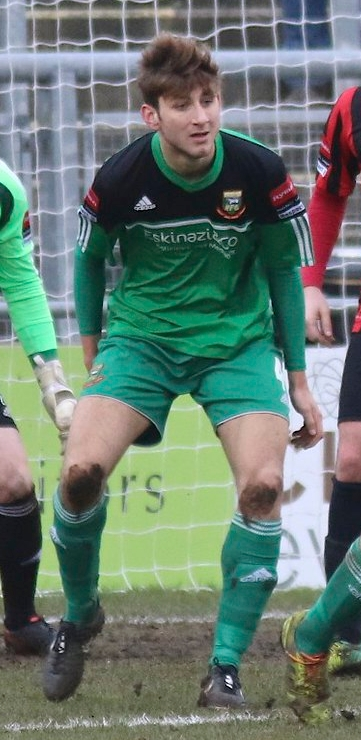
- Goode playing for Hendon in 2015

Personal information
- Full name: Charles James Goode
- Date of birth: 3 August 1995 (age 31)
- Place of birth: Watford, England
- Height: 6 ft 5 in (1.96 m)
- Position: Centre-back

Team information
- Current team: Milton Keynes Dons
- Number: 5

Youth career
- –2005: Watford
- 2005–2012: Fulham
- 2012–2013: Harefield United

Senior career*
Years	Team	Apps	(Gls)
2013–2014	Hadley	4	(3)
2014	AFC Hayes	12	(1)
2014–2015	Hendon	26	(2)
2015–2019	Scunthorpe United	64	(5)
2019	→ Northampton Town (loan)	17	(0)
2019–2020	Northampton Town	36	(3)
2020–2024	Brentford	14	(0)
2022	→ Sheffield United (loan)	2	(0)
2023	→ Blackpool (loan)	2	(0)
2024	→ Wigan Athletic (loan)	13	(0)
2024–2026	Stevenage	62	(1)
2026–	Milton Keynes Dons	11	(2)

International career
2015	England C	1	(0)
- * Club domestic league appearances and goals as of 27 October 2026 (UTC)

Charles James Goode (born 3 August 1995) is an English professional footballer who plays as a centre-back for EFL League One club Milton Keynes Dons.

A graduate of the Fulham Academy, Goode began his senior career in non-League football, before breaking into League football with Scunthorpe United in 2015. A loan to Northampton Town in January 2019 led to a permanent move to the club at the end of the 2018–19 season. Following victory in the 2020 League Two play-off final, Goode transferred to Championship club Brentford, with whom he was promoted to the Premier League in 2021. Following an injury and illness-affected spell during which he appeared sparingly, Goode transferred to Stevenage in 2024. He was capped by England C at international level.

== Club career ==
=== Early career ===
Goode began his youth career as a forward, before being moved back through midfield to right back. After a spell with hometown club Watford, he joined the Fulham Academy at the age of 10 and was released at age 16 in 2012. Goode dropped into non-League football and after a season with Harefield United U18, he gained his first experience of senior football with Hadley, A.F.C. Hayes and Hendon between 2013 and 2015. He was a part of the 2014–15 Hendon squad which reached the Isthmian League Premier Division play-off final and won the 2014–15 Isthmian League Cup and London Senior Cup. A growth spurt during the 2014–15 season saw Goode move from right back to central defence.

=== Scunthorpe United ===
On 10 June 2015, Goode joined League One club Scunthorpe United on a free transfer and signed a two-year contract, with the option of a further year. He failed to fully establish himself during four seasons at Glanford Park and by the time of his departure in July 2019, he had made 85 appearances and scored six goals.

=== Northampton Town ===
As a result of falling down the pecking order at Scunthorpe United, on 31 January 2019, Goode joined League Two club Northampton Town on loan until the end of the 2018–19 season. During what remained of the season, he made 17 appearances and signed a three-year contract with the club for an undisclosed fee on 3 July 2019.

Goode was named team captain for the 2019–20 season and made 45 appearances and scored four goals during a campaign which culminated in promotion to League One, after victory in the 2020 League Two play-off final. He was voted the club's 2019–20 Supporters' Player of the Year, was named in the League Two PFA Team of the Year and was nominated for the September and October 2019 PFA Fans' Player of the Month awards. On 18 August 2020, Goode departed Northampton Town for a club-record fee. During 18 months at Sixfields, he made 62 appearances and scored four goals.

=== Brentford ===
==== 2020–21 season ====
On 18 August 2020, Goode transferred to Championship club Brentford and signed a four-year contract, with the option of a further year, for an undisclosed fee reported to be "just over" £1 million. Competing with Mads Bech Sørensen for third place in the centre back pecking order, Goode played sparingly during the opening months of the 2020–21 season. After a period out with illness, he returned to match play in mid-December 2020, but then spent another period out of the squad until returning to full fitness in March 2021. Goode made four late-season appearances, but did not appear during Brentford's 2021 EFL playoff campaign. As an unused substitute during the 2–0 victory in the Final over Swansea City, he received a promotion medal.

==== 2021–22 season and loan to Sheffield United ====
Goode made his first appearance of the 2021–22 season with a start in a EFL Cup third round match versus Oldham Athletic and his performance in the 7–0 win was recognised with a place in the EFL Cup Team of the Round. In early November 2021, injuries to summer transfers Zanka and Kristoffer Ajer allowed Goode to make a run of Premier League starts. His run was ended by a hamstring injury suffered in late December and he failed to return to the matchday squad prior to his departure on loan for the remainder of the season on the final day of the winter transfer window.

Linking up with Championship club Sheffield United, Goode was sent off for the first time in his professional career on his second appearance, for a two-footed challenge on Blackburn Rovers attacker Reda Khadra on 23 February 2022. While training during the suspension, he suffered a knee cartilage problem, which led to his return to Brentford for treatment in April. Goode failed to return to fitness before the end of the season and he was not involved in the Blades' unsuccessful playoff campaign.

==== 2022–23 season and loan to Blackpool ====
The knee cartilage problem saw Goode miss Brentford's entire 2022–23 pre-season and the first half of the regular season. He was included in the squad for the mid-season training camp and made one friendly appearance during the period. Goode returned to the matchday squad on Boxing Day 2022 and remained an unused substitute during a 2–2 draw with Tottenham Hotspur. He failed to win any further first team call-ups before joining Championship club Blackpool on loan until the end of the 2022–23 season on 23 January 2023. Goode immediately went into the starting lineup, before suffering a season-ending hamstring injury on his third appearance.

==== 2023–24 season and loan to Wigan Athletic ====
During the 2023–24 pre-season, Goode was included in Brentford's 2023 Premier League Summer Series squad, but he was not called into a matchday squad during the tournament. He returned to match play with the B team on 25 October 2023 and was an unused substitute during six first team matches either side of the turn of the year. On 22 January 2024, Goode joined League One club Wigan Athletic on loan until the end of the 2023–24 season. He made 13 appearances during the remainder of a mid-table season and returned to Brentford one week early, for personal reasons. Goode was released by Brentford when his contract expired at the end of the 2023–24 season. He made just 20 appearances during his four seasons with the club.

=== Stevenage ===
On 5 August 2024, Goode transferred to League One club Stevenage and signed a one-year contract, with the option of a further year, on a free transfer. Either side of four months out with a broken fibula, Goode made 24 appearances and scored one goal during a mid-table 2024–25 season. The one-year option on Goode's contract was triggered for the 2025–26 season and he made 45 appearances, scoring one goal, prior to the club's defeat in the playoff semi-finals. Goode entered discussions over a new contract at the end of the season, but he elected to depart the club. Goode made 69 appearances and scored two goals during his two seasons at Broadhall Way.

=== Milton Keynes Dons ===
On 5 June 2026, Goode signed an undisclosed-length contract with League One club Milton Keynes Dons on a free transfer, effective 1 July 2026. He made his debut on 8 August 2026 in a 4–1 EFL Cup first round defeat away to Norwich City.

== International career ==
Goode was capped once by England C, as a second-half substitute in a 2–1 friendly victory over Republic of Ireland U21 on 1 June 2015.

== Personal life ==
Goode's father and brother Ben also became footballers. He is an Arsenal supporter. Goode attended Bushey Meads School and during his career in non-League football, he worked in his family's business, installing electric blinds.

== Career statistics ==
As of 27 October 2026

Appearances and goals by club, season and competition
Club	Season	League			National cup (Note: Includes FA Cup)		League cup (Note: Includes EFL Cup)		Other		Total	
Club	Season	Division	Apps	Goals	Apps	Goals	Apps	Goals	Apps	Goals	Apps	Goals
Hadley	2013–14	Spartan South Midlands League Premier Division	4	3	3	0	―		1 (Note: Appearance in FA Vase)	0	8	3
AFC Hayes	2014–15	Southern League Division One Central	12	1	3	0	―		2 (Note: Appearances in FA Trophy)	0	17	1
Hendon	2014–15	Isthmian League Premier Division	26	2	―		―		10 (Note: 5 appearances in Isthmian League Cup, 2 appearances in Isthmian League Premier Division play-offs, 2 appearances in London Senior Cup, 1 appearance in Middlesex Senior Cup)	0	36	2
Scunthorpe United	2015–16	League One	10	1	3	0	0	0	1 (Note: Appearance(s) in EFL Trophy)	1	14	2
Scunthorpe United	2016–17	League One	20	0	1	0	1	0	5	0	27	0
Scunthorpe United	2017–18	League One	13	1	2	0	1	0	3	0	19	1
Scunthorpe United	2018–19	League One	21	3	1	0	1	0	2	0	25	3
Scunthorpe United	Total		64	5	7	0	3	0	11	1	85	6
Northampton Town (loan)	2018–19	League Two	17	0	―		―		―		17	0
Northampton Town	2019–20	League Two	36	3	5	1	0	0	4 (Note: 3 appearances in League Two play-offs, 1 appearance in EFL Trophy)	0	45	4
Northampton Town	Total		53	3	5	1	0	0	4	0	62	4
Brentford	2020–21	Championship	8	0	1	0	3	0	0	0	12	0
Brentford	2021–22	Premier League	6	0	0	0	2	0	―		8	0
Brentford	2022–23	Premier League	0	0	0	0	0	0	―		0	0
Brentford	2023–24	Premier League	0	0	0	0	0	0	―		0	0
Brentford	Total		14	0	1	0	5	0	0	0	20	0
Sheffield United (loan)	2021–22	Championship	2	0	―		―		0	0	2	0
Blackpool (loan)	2022–23	Championship	2	0	1	0	―		―		3	0
Wigan Athletic (loan)	2023–24	League One	13	0	―		―		―		13	0
Stevenage	2024–25	League One	21	0	0	0	1	1	2	0	24	1
Stevenage	2025–26	League One	41	1	0	0	1	0	3 (Note: 2 appearances in League One play-offs, 1 appearance in EFL Trophy)	0	45	1
Stevenage	Total		62	1	0	0	2	1	5	0	69	2
Milton Keynes Dons	2026–27	League One	11	2	0	0	1	0	1	1	12	2
Career total			163	17	20	1	11	1	34	2	328	21

== Honours ==
Hendon

- Isthmian League Cup: 2014–15
- London Senior Cup: 2014–15

Northampton Town

- EFL League Two play-offs: 2020

Brentford

- EFL Championship play-offs: 2021

Individual

- Harefield United U18 Players' Player of the Year: 2012–13
- Northampton Town Supporters' Player of the Year: 2019–20
- PFA Team of the Year: 2019–20 League Two
- EFL League One Team of the Year: 2025–26
