= Callum Morton =

English footballer (born 2000)

Personal information
- Full name: Callum Damian Peter Morton
- Date of birth: 19 January 2000 (age 26)
- Place of birth: Torquay, England
- Height: 5 ft 10 in (1.78 m)
- Position: Striker

Team information
- Current team: Torquay United

Youth career
- 2014–2015: Torquay United
- 2015–2017: Yeovil Town
- 2017–2018: West Bromwich Albion

Senior career*
Years	Team	Apps	(Gls)
2018–2022	West Bromwich Albion	0	(0)
2018–2019	→ Braintree Town (loan)	14	(5)
2020	→ Northampton Town (loan)	9	(5)
2020–2021	→ Lincoln City (loan)	17	(2)
2021–2022	→ Fleetwood Town (loan)	18	(4)
2022	→ Peterborough United (loan)	7	(0)
2022–2023	Fleetwood Town	20	(2)
2023–2025	Salford City	27	(0)
2023–2024	→ Forest Green Rovers (loan)	11	(3)
2024	→ Northampton Town (loan)	7	(1)
2025–2026	Bristol Rovers	4	(1)
2026	Worthing	9	(1)
2026–	Torquay United	0	(0)
- * Club domestic league appearances and goals as of 13:27, 25 May 2026 (UTC)

Callum Damian Peter Morton (born 19 January 2000) is an English professional footballer who plays as a striker for National League South club Torquay United.

Morton began his career at his hometown club Torquay United until the closure of the youth team in 2015, at which point he went to play in the Yeovil Town youth set up, before signing for West Bromwich Albion. During his four years with Albion, he had spells on loan at Braintree Town, Northampton Town, Lincoln City, Fleetwood Town, and Peterborough United. He returned to Fleetwood on a permanent contract in 2022, but left after six months to sign for Salford.

== Career ==
=== West Bromwich Albion ===
Born in Torquay, England, Morton was part of the Torquay United youth team until its closure in 2015, at which point he joined the youth academy of Yeovil Town, later signing a two-year scholarship in February 2016. In January 2017, after scoring against them the previous month in Yeovil's 3–2 FA Youth Cup victory, Morton signed for West Bromwich Albion for an undisclosed fee.

In January 2020, Morton joined Northampton Town on loan. In June 2020 he won the EFL League Two Play-offs with Northampton; he scored twice in the semi-final second leg against Cheltenham Town to help them overturn a 2–0 first leg deficit, and then scored once in the final as they defeated Exeter City 4–0.

On 4 September 2020, it was announced that Morton, alongside West Brom teammate Alex Palmer, had joined Lincoln City on loan for the season. He made his debut for Lincoln the next day, coming off the bench in the first round of the EFL Cup. In the following round he would score his first goal for Lincoln in a 5–0 win over Bradford City. On 25 September, it was announced that Morton had suffered a shoulder injury and would miss a number of games. On 3 November 2020, Lincoln stated that Morton's injury had not improved as much as hoped, and that surgery might be required. In January 2021 it was announced that his recovery was nearing its end and that it was hoped he would be available to play in February. He would return to action on 2 March 2021, coming off the bench against Fleetwood Town and scoring a goal.

He moved on loan to Fleetwood in July 2021. After scoring seven goals in twenty-two appearances in all competitions, Morton was recalled by West Brom on 8 January 2022. On 13 January, Morton joined Championship side Peterborough United on loan for the remainder of the 2021–22 season.

=== Fleetwood Town ===
In June 2022 it was announced that he would return to Fleetwood on a permanent contract on 1 July, signing a three-year contract for an undisclosed transfer fee.

=== Salford City ===
On 13 January 2023, Morton signed a two-and-a-half-year contract with League Two side Salford City. He moved on loan to Forest Green Rovers in September 2023. The loan ended in January 2024.

On 4 July 2024, Morton returned to Northampton Town on a season-long loan deal. He suffered a serious knee injury against Wrexham in October 2024, which ruled him out for the rest of the 2024–25 season.

=== Bristol Rovers ===
On 28 November 2025, Morton joined League Two club Bristol Rovers on a short-term deal. On 19 December, he scored his first goal for the club on his first start, equalising in a 1–1 draw with Crewe Alexandra that ended Rovers' ten-match losing streak in the league, although he was later forced off with a hamstring strain.

In February 2026, new Rovers manager Steve Evans said that it was "unlikely" that Morton would stay at the club, and he was released later that month.

=== Worthing ===
Morton joined Worthing in March 2026, on a contract lasting until the end of the season.

=== Torquay United ===
Morton re-joined Torquay United on 18 May 2026.

== Career statistics ==
As of match played 25 April 2026

Appearances and goals by club, season and competition
Club	Season	League			FA Cup		EFL Cup		Other		Total	
Club	Season	Division	Apps	Goals	Apps	Goals	Apps	Goals	Apps	Goals	Apps	Goals
West Bromwich Albion	2017–18	Premier League	0	0	0	0	0	0	—		0	0
West Bromwich Albion	2018–19	Championship	0	0	0	0	0	0	—		0	0
West Bromwich Albion	2019–20	Championship	0	0	0	0	0	0	—		0	0
West Bromwich Albion	2020–21	Premier League	0	0	0	0	0	0	—		0	0
West Bromwich Albion	2021–22	Championship	0	0	0	0	0	0	—		0	0
West Bromwich Albion	Total		0	0	0	0	0	0	0	0	0	0
West Bromwich Albion U23	2017–18	—			—		—		3 (Note: Appearance(s) in EFL Trophy)	0	3	0
West Bromwich Albion U23	2018–19	—			—		—		3	0	3	0
Braintree Town (loan)	2018–19	National League	14	5	0	0	—		1 (Note: Appearance in FA Trophy)	0	15	5
Northampton Town (loan)	2019–20	League Two	9	5	0	0	0	0	3 (Note: Appearances in League Two play-offs)	3	12	8
Lincoln City (loan)	2020–21	League One	17	2	0	0	2	1	2 (Note: One appearance in EFL Trophy, one appearances in League One play-offs)	0	21	3
Fleetwood Town (loan)	2021–22	League One	18	4	1	0	1	0	2	3	22	7
Peterborough United (loan)	2021–22	Championship	7	0	0	0	0	0	—		7	0
Fleetwood Town	2022–23	League One	20	2	3	0	0	0	1	0	24	2
Salford City	2022–23	League Two	14	0	0	0	0	0	2	0	16	0
Salford City	2023–24	League Two	13	0	0	0	0	0	0	0	13	0
Salford City	2024–25	League Two	0	0	0	0	0	0	0	0	0	0
Salford City	Total		27	0	0	0	0	0	2	0	29	0
Forest Green Rovers (loan)	2023–24	League Two	11	3	2	1	0	0	2	0	15	4
Northampton Town (loan)	2024–25	League One	7	1	0	0	1	0	0	0	8	1
Bristol Rovers	2025–26	League Two	4	1	1	0	0	0	1	0	6	1
Worthing	2025–26	National League South	9	1	—		—		1 (Note: Appearance in Sussex Senior Cup)	1	10	2
Torquay United	2026–27	National League South	0	0	0	0	—		0	0	0	0
Career total			143	24	7	1	4	1	21	7	175	33

== Honours ==
Northampton Town

- EFL League Two play-offs: 2020

Individual

- EFL League Two Player of the Month: February 2020
