= Paul Anderson (footballer) =

English footballer (born 1988)

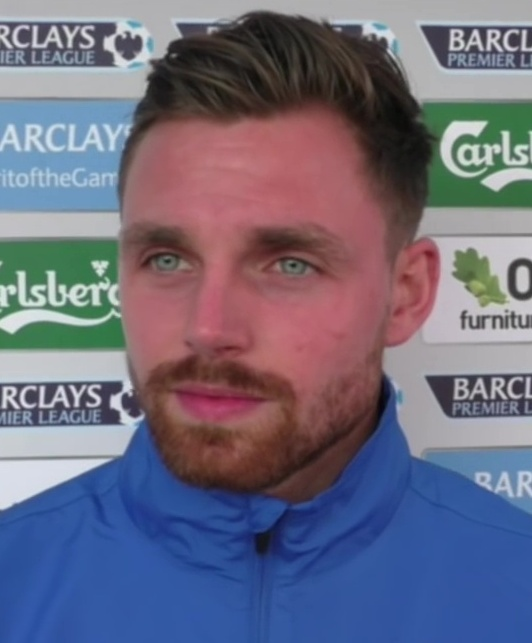
- Anderson after signing for Bradford City, 2015

Personal information
- Full name: Paul Anderson
- Date of birth: 23 July 1988 (age 38)
- Place of birth: Melton Mowbray, England
- Height: 5 ft 9 in (1.75 m)
- Position: Winger

Team information
- Current team: Derby County (U15 head hoach)

Youth career
- West Bromwich Albion
- 2005–2006: Hull City

Senior career*
Years	Team	Apps	(Gls)
2006–2009	Liverpool	0	(0)
2007–2008	→ Swansea City (loan)	31	(7)
2008–2009	→ Nottingham Forest (loan)	26	(2)
2009–2012	Nottingham Forest	89	(7)
2012–2013	Bristol City	29	(3)
2013–2015	Ipswich Town	67	(6)
2015–2016	Bradford City	14	(0)
2016–2017	Northampton Town	36	(6)
2017–2019	Mansfield Town	33	(1)
2019	Plymouth Argyle	4	(0)
2019–2020	Northampton Town	14	(1)
2021–2024	Melton Town		

International career
2007	England U19	4	(1)
- * Club domestic league appearances and goals

Paul Anderson (born 23 July 1988) is an English former professional footballer who played as a winger. He is a former England U19 international. He is currently Derby County under-15s head coach.

He started his career at Hull City before moving to Liverpool but made no league appearances for either club. Loan spells with Swansea City and Nottingham Forest resulted in a permanent move to the latter for whom he made nearly 100 league appearances. In 2012, he moved to Bristol City before signing for Ipswich Town the following year. In 2015, he moved to Bradford City. In the 2016 Summer transfer window he moved to Northampton Town on a free transfer after leaving Bradford City. In 2017 he joined Mansfield Town but left in 2019 and joined Plymouth Argyle. On 18 October Northampton Town announced they had signed the winger on a short-term deal.

== Club career ==
=== Early career ===
Born in Melton Mowbray, Leicestershire, Anderson attended Brownlow County Primary School, then John Ferneley College and then King Edward School in Melton Mowbray. As a schoolboy he was attached to Leicester City but they declined to offer him a professional contract, believing he would never make the grade. After this setback Anderson then decided to join Hull City, the club his father Phil Anderson had played for. His performances for their academy team caught the eye of Liverpool who took him to Anfield on an extended trial.

=== Liverpool ===
On 11 November 2005 Liverpool's official website announced that a swap deal was arranged for Liverpool's John Welsh to move to Hull, while Anderson went the other way after impressing during a trial.

Anderson was a regular in the Liverpool U-18 team which won the 2006 FA Youth Cup and his performances led some to compare him to Michael Owen.

Anderson earned his first call-up to the senior team in March 2006 when he was an unused substitute in Liverpool's Champions League Round of 16 second leg against Benfica. On 15 July 2006, Anderson made a memorable debut for the Liverpool's first team in a pre-season friendly against Wrexham. Anderson scored an early goal in the fifth minute to set Liverpool on their way to a 2–0 victory.

On 1 July 2008, immediately prior to his loan to Nottingham Forest, Anderson signed a new three-year contract.

=== Swansea City ===
Anderson joined League One side Swansea City on loan for the 2007–08 season. After a successful season with the club, Anderson was named Swansea Young Player of the Year scoring 10 goals in all competitions. Swansea manager Roberto Martínez expressed his desire to sign the winger on a permanent basis. Swansea faced competition for the player from Nottingham Forest who were also understood to be interested in the player.

=== Nottingham Forest ===
On 26 June 2008, it was announced that Anderson was to join Forest on a season-long loan. After suffering with injury, Anderson eventually made his Forest debut against Queens Park Rangers on 18 October 2008. He scored his first goal for the club in November, in the 2–1 home defeat against Norwich City. His second goal came in a 2–0 home win against Plymouth Argyle.

On 23 January 2009, in an FA Cup fourth round qualifier, between Derby County and Nottingham Forest, Anderson suffered a serious injury in the second half of the game. Anderson fell awkwardly after a challenge by Derby's Paul Connolly and suffered a broken arm and dislocated wrist. He returned only four weeks later, and helped Forest secure Championship status, finishing 19th.

In May 2009, Liverpool accepted a bid from Swansea for Anderson. However, due to Roberto Martínez leaving Swansea, personal terms were agreed and Forest signed the winger on a permanent basis for a fee of £250,000 on 30 June 2009. The 20-year-old signed a three-year deal, becoming Forest's third confirmed signing in two days.

=== Bristol City ===
Anderson signed for Bristol City on 26 July 2012 on a two-year deal. He made his debut on 18 August in a 1–0 defeat against his former club Nottingham Forest. He scored his first goal for the club on 23 October in a 4–3 defeat against Burnley. He scored his second goal for the club on 29 December in a 4–2 win against Peterborough United. He scored his third goal of the season on 29 January in a 2–0 win at home to Watford.

=== Ipswich Town ===
On 8 July 2013 Anderson signed a two-year contract with Ipswich Town as part of a swap deal (with Jay Emmanuel-Thomas joining Anderson's previous club Bristol City). During the 2014/15 season, Anderson helped Ipswich qualify for The Championship playoffs. Anderson's best moment in an Ipswich shirt came when he scored a crucial equaliser against bitter rivals Norwich City in the first leg of the semi-finals. This led to Ipswich fan Ross Morgan punching a hole in his ceiling during the celebrations. Anderson kindly offered to foot the bill for the damage caused, which was well received by the Town and many other football fans alike.

After surprisingly being released at the end of the 2014–15 season after Ipswich failed to gain promotion, despite Anderson being top of the clubs assists chart for the 2014–15 season, On 19 May 2015 Ipswich Town fans created a petition for Anderson to be re-signed by the club.

=== Bradford City ===
On 1 August 2015, Anderson signed for Bradford City on a two-year deal following his release from Ipswich Town. He made his debut on 8 August appearing as a substitute in a 4–1 defeat against Swindon Town.

=== Northampton Town ===
On 31 August 2016, Anderson signed for Northampton Town on a free transfer.

=== Mansfield Town ===
On 16 May 2017 Anderson signed for Mansfield Town. He scored his first goal for Mansfield in a 2–0 win over Forest Green Rovers on 12 August 2017.

He was transfer-listed by Mansfield at the end of the 2017–18 season.

=== Plymouth Argyle ===
He was released from his contract at Mansfield on 31 January 2019, transfer deadline day. He signed for Plymouth Argyle on 22 February 2019.

He was released by Plymouth Argyle at the end of the 2018–19 season.

=== Northampton Town ===
It was announced on 18 October 2019 that he had signed a short-term deal at Northampton Town. After making 14 appearances, only being on the losing side once, Anderson's deal at Northampton was extended until the end of the 2019–20 season on 14 January 2020. On 15 January 2020 Anderson signed a new deal to keep him at Northampton Town until the end of the current season. He helped Northampton win promotion from League Two during the 2019–20 season by winning the 2020 EFL League Two play-off final on 29 June. He was released at the end of the season following the end of his contract.

== International career ==
Anderson has been capped by England at Under-19 level.

== Career statistics ==
As of match played 29 June 2020

Appearances and goals by club, season and competition
Club	Season	League			FA Cup		League Cup		Other		Total	
Club	Season	Division	Apps	Goals	Apps	Goals	Apps	Goals	Apps	Goals	Apps	Goals
Swansea City (loan)	2007–08	League One	31	7	3	0	2	1	5 (Note: Appearances in EFL Trophy)	2	41	10
Nottingham Forest (loan)	2008–09	Championship	26	2	2	0	0	0	0	0	28	2
Nottingham Forest	2009–10	Championship	37	4	2	0	3	1	2 (Note: Appearance(s) in EFL Championship play-offs)	0	44	5
Nottingham Forest	2010–11	Championship	36	3	1	1	1	0	1	0	39	4
Nottingham Forest	2011–12	Championship	16	0	2	0	1	0	0	0	19	0
Nottingham Forest	Total		89	7	5	1	5	1	3	0	102	9
Bristol City	2012–13	Championship	29	3	1	0	0	0	0	0	30	3
Ipswich Town	2013–14	Championship	31	5	1	0	1	0	0	0	33	5
Ipswich Town	2014–15	Championship	36	1	0	0	0	0	2	1	38	2
Ipswich Town	Total		67	6	1	0	1	0	2	1	71	7
Bradford City	2015–16	League One	11	0	0	0	1	0	2 (Note: Appearances in EFL League One play-offs)	0	14	0
Bradford City	2016–17	League One	3	0	0	0	1	0	0	0	4	0
Bradford City	Total		14	0	0	0	2	0	2	0	18	0
Northampton Town	2016–17	League One	36	6	2	1	1	0	0	0	39	7
Mansfield Town	2017–18	League Two	33	0	4	0	1	0	2	0	40	0
Plymouth Argyle	2018–19	League One	4	0	0	0	0	0	0	0	4	0
Northampton Town	2019–20	League Two	18	1	5	0	0	0	2 (Note: Appearance in EFL League Two play-offs)	0	25	1
Career total			347	32	23	2	12	2	16	3	398	39

== Honours ==
Liverpool

- FA Youth Cup: 2005–06

Swansea City

- Football League One: 2007–08

Northampton Town

- EFL League Two play-offs: 2020
