= Mark Marshall =

Jamaican footballer (born 1987)

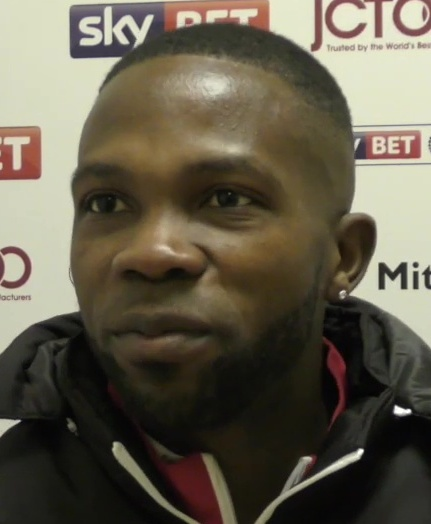
- Marshall in 2016

Personal information
- Full name: Mark Anthony Marshall
- Date of birth: 5 May 1987 (age 39)
- Place of birth: Manchester, Jamaica
- Height: 6 ft 1 in (1.85 m)
- Position: Winger

Team information
- Current team: Beckenham Town

Youth career
- ?–2005: Carshalton Athletic

Senior career*
Years	Team	Apps	(Gls)
2005–2007	Carshalton Athletic	?	(?)
2007–2008	Grays Athletic	11	(0)
2007–2008	→ Eastleigh (loan)	5	(3)
2008	Eastleigh	10	(2)
2008–2010	Swindon Town	19	(0)
2009	→ Hereford United (loan)	8	(0)
2010–2012	Barnet	71	(7)
2014	Coventry City	14	(0)
2014–2015	Port Vale	46	(7)
2015–2017	Bradford City	73	(6)
2017–2019	Charlton Athletic	49	(2)
2019–2020	Gillingham	18	(0)
2020–2021	Northampton Town	36	(1)
2021–2022	Crawley Town	18	(0)
2023	Maidstone United	11	(0)
2023–2024	Carshalton Athletic	34	(4)
2024–2026	Dulwich Hamlet	31	(1)
2026–	Beckenham Town	29	(3)
- * Club domestic league appearances and goals as of 19:58, 29 April 2026 (UTC)

Mark Anthony Marshall (born 5 May 1987) is a Jamaican professional footballer who plays as a winger for Southern Counties East League Premier Division club Beckenham Town.

Marshall began his career with non-League sides Carshalton Athletic, Grays Athletic and Eastleigh, before winning a move into the English Football League with Swindon Town in August 2008. He was loaned out to Hereford United in September 2009, before he joined Barnet in July 2010. He was a first-team regular for the club before he received a two-year ban from football after he was found to have the stimulant Methylhexanamine in his system following a routine drug test on Boxing Day 2011. He returned to the game with Coventry City in February 2014 and signed with Port Vale in July 2014. A year later, he switched clubs to Bradford City and became the club's Player of the Season for the 2016–17 campaign. He joined Charlton Athletic in June 2017, and after two seasons with the club, he moved on to Gillingham in July 2019.

He signed with Northampton Town in January 2020. He helped the club to win promotion out of League Two via the play-offs in 2020. He signed with Crawley Town in September 2021 after being released following Northampton's relegation and remained with Crawley until December 2022. He joined Maidstone United in February 2023. He then returned to his first club, Carshalton Athletic, for the start of the 2023–24 season. He joined Dulwich Hamlet in July 2024, moving on to Beckenham Town after two seasons.

== Career ==
=== Early career ===
Marshall's early career saw him come through the ranks at Isthmian League side Carshalton Athletic before he joined Conference Premier club Grays Athletic for the 2007–08 season after unsuccessful trials with Premier League club Reading and League One side Yeovil Town. He was loaned out to Eastleigh of the Conference South in January 2008, and joined the club permanently before the end of the month.

=== Swindon Town ===
During the pre-season of 2008–09 he joined Swindon Town on trial, but was originally not offered a deal as Town continued their pursuit of winger Kevin Betsy. A subsequent loan offer from Bournemouth was rejected. However, Swindon's move for Betsy failed as the player joined League One rivals Southend United and Marshall finally joined Swindon in early August 2008 on a two-year deal for an undisclosed fee. His debut for the "Robins" came in a 2–0 defeat away to Cheltenham Town on 16 August. He continued to make some cameo appearances from the substitute bench under manager Maurice Malpas, but his involvement with the first-team ended at the same time as Malpas' departure in November 2008. New manager Danny Wilson accepted an offer from Bournemouth to take the winger on a one-month loan in January 2009, but Marshall rejected the move. He later made a few substitute appearances as the season drew to a close. Marshall's first season at Swindon saw him make 15 appearances in all competitions, all but one as a substitute.

In September 2009, Marshall joined League Two side Hereford United on a one-month loan. The loan was later extended into a second month after he impressed in his early appearances at Edgar Street. He played a total of ten games for the "Bulls". He failed to establish himself in the first-team back at Swindon, despite the departure of Anthony McNamee, new loan signing Frank Nouble was preferred. Swindon released him in May 2010 after struggling for a first-team place under manager Danny Wilson.

=== Barnet ===
Marshall joined Barnet as one of manager Mark Stimson's 14 new signings in July 2010. He played all 46 of the "Bees" League Two games of the 2010–11 campaign, contributing six league goals to help the club to stay one point above the relegation zone by the end of the season.

He remained a key player at Underhill for new manager Lawrie Sanchez during the first half of the 2011–12 season. However, Marshall tested positive for the stimulant Methylhexanamine following a routine drug test on Boxing Day 2011 when Barnet lost 3–0 at Dagenham & Redbridge; he claimed "to have unwittingly taken a banned substance in a supplement". The Football Association later confirmed Marshall would serve a two-year ban from all football activity, which started from the date of his provisional ban on 20 January 2012. Marshall was released by Barnet following the expiry of his contract in May 2012.

=== Coventry City ===
Following the expiry of his ban, Marshall was signed by Coventry City on a short-term contract in February 2014 after impressing manager Steven Pressley on trial. He made his first competitive appearance in two years on 4 February, coming on as a 72nd-minute substitute for Carl Baker in a 2–1 win over Bristol City at Ashton Gate. In total he made 14 League One appearances during the 2013–14 season, but despite being popular with fans he was not offered a fresh contract in the summer by manager Steven Pressley.

=== Port Vale ===
In July 2014, Marshall signed a one-year deal for League One side Port Vale. He scored his first goal for the "Valiants" on 30 August, in a 2–1 defeat to Chesterfield at Vale Park. He scored his third goal for the club on 1 November, and also set up the winning goal in a 2–1 victory at Colchester United, and was named on that week's Football League Team of the Week. He scored seven goals in 49 appearances in the 2014–15 campaign, and it was reported in The Sentinel that his "combination of skill, pace and work rate made him a favourite among supporters". He was voted as the Away Travel Player of the Year by the club's supporters. He left the club after he rejected the offer of a new contract in the summer, a decision that chairman Norman Smurthwaite described as "silly".

=== Bradford City ===
In July 2015, Marshall signed a two-year contract with League One side Bradford City. He made 38 appearances across the 2015–16 campaign, but started just eight league games, and was an unused substitute as Bradford were beaten by Millwall in the play-off semi-finals.

He was nominated for the EFL League One Player of the Month award for January 2017, which was won by Bury striker James Vaughan. In April 2017 he was named Bradford City's Player of the Year for the 2016–17 season. Manager Stuart McCall praised Marshall's consistency and versatility, saying that "he crosses and shoots equally as well with both feet" and "is one of the highest for assists in the league". He helped the "Bantams" to reach the League One play-off final against Millwall at Wembley Stadium, and was described by the BBC as "particularly influential" in the match; he provided a goalscoring opportunity to Billy Clarke, but Clarke's shot was saved and Bradford lost the game 1–0. Marshall was reported to have made 261 crosses and 285 completed dribbles in League One in 2016–17, ahead of any other player in the division.

=== Charlton Athletic ===
On 17 June 2017, Marshall signed a two-year contract with League One club Charlton Athletic; "Addicks" manager Karl Robinson said he was "one of our main targets" alongside former Bradford teammate Billy Clarke. However, he missed much of the opening three months of the 2017–18 season after picking up an injury during pre-season. He went on to score two goals in 31 games to help Charlton qualify for the play-offs under new manager Lee Bowyer. However, he did not feature in the play-offs as Charlton secured promotion with a 2–1 victory over Sunderland. He was released by Charlton at the end of the 2018–19 season.

=== Gillingham ===
After his release from Charlton, Marshall signed for Gillingham on 25 July 2019, shortly after the club's signing of Sheffield United winger Nathan Thomas fell through. He made 23 appearances in the first half of the 2019–20 season, though started just three league games, before leaving the club upon the expiry of his contract on 23 January 2020; "Gills" manager Steve Evans said Marshall was "unlucky at times" and cited budget constrains for his decision not to offer Marshall a contract extension.

=== Northampton Town ===
Marshall joined League Two side Northampton Town on a short-term deal on 25 January 2020. Manager Keith Curle said he was please to bring in "a player with pace, trickery, a strong work ethic" despite "really strong competition" from other clubs. The season was curtailed early due to the COVID-19 pandemic in England and Northampton went on to qualify for the play-offs; Marshall played as a 31st-minute substitute for Nicky Adams in the behind closed doors Wembley final as the "Cobblers" recorded a 4–0 victory over Exeter City to secure promotion into League One. Marshall provided the assist for Sam Hoskins for the third goal.

He scored his first goal for Northampton in a 2–1 win at Shrewsbury Town on 19 September 2020. He barely featured towards the end of Curle's reign as he chose to play without wingers before Marshall returned to the first-team after Jon Brady took charge in February. He scored two goals in 33 games in the 2020–21 season and was not offered a new contract when the club's retained list was published in May following Town's relegation out of League One.

=== Crawley Town ===
On 21 September 2021, it was announced that Marshall had joined League Two club Crawley Town on a one-month rolling contract, having been on trial at the club since the start of the season. Manager John Yems said: "I've known Mark for many years, he will be a great asset for the team". He made his debut four days later, coming on as a substitute in a 2–1 win over former club Bradford City at the Broadfield Stadium. He featured 20 times in the 2021–22 campaign, though started just one league match, and entered contract talks with the club in the summer. However, he left the club upon the expiry of his contract in December 2022, having been limited to four cup appearances in the first half of the 2022–23 season.

=== Non-League ===
On 17 February 2023, Marshall signed with National League club Maidstone United. The following month he stated his intention to continue playing into his 40s. He made eleven appearances as Maidstone were relegated at the end of the 2022–23 season before being released. He rejoined Carshalton Athletic in the Isthmian League Premier Division for the 2023–24 season and went on to score five goals from 41 appearances. On 30 July 2024, Marshall joined Dulwich Hamlet, also of the Isthmian League Premier Division. He made 35 appearances in the 2024–25 campaign. On 11 August 2025, he signed with Isthmian League South East Division side Beckenham Town. He played 29 games in the 2025–26 season, scoring three goals, as the club fell to relegation.

== Style of play ==
Marshall is known for his pace.

== Career statistics ==
As of match played 25 April 2026

Appearances and goals by club, season and competition
Club	Season	League			FA Cup		League Cup		Other		Total	
Club	Season	Division	Apps	Goals	Apps	Goals	Apps	Goals	Apps	Goals	Apps	Goals
Grays Athletic	2007–08	Conference Premier	11	0	2	0	—		2 (Note: Two appearances in the Essex Senior Cup)	1	15	1
Eastleigh (loan)	2007–08	Conference South	5	3	0	0	—		2 (Note: One appearance in the FA Trophy, one appearance in the Hampshire Senior Cup)	0	7	3
Eastleigh	2007–08	Conference South	10	2	0	0	—		0	0	10	2
Eastleigh	Total		15	5	0	0	—		2	0	17	5
Swindon Town	2008–09	League One	12	0	1	0	0	0	2 (Note: Appearances in the Football League Trophy)	0	15	0
Swindon Town	2009–10	League One	7	0	0	0	2	0	0	0	9	0
Swindon Town	Total		19	0	1	0	2	0	2	0	24	0
Hereford United (loan)	2009–10	League Two	8	0	0	0	0	0	2	0	10	0
Barnet	2010–11	League Two	46	6	2	0	1	0	1	1	50	7
Barnet	2011–12	League Two	25	1	2	0	2	0	5	2	34	3
Barnet	Total		71	7	4	0	3	0	6	3	84	10
Coventry City	2013–14	League One	14	0	—		—		—		14	0
Port Vale	2014–15	League One	46	7	1	0	1	0	1	0	49	7
Bradford City	2015–16	League One	31	0	5	0	1	0	1	0	38	0
Bradford City	2016–17	League One	42	6	1	0	1	0	6 (Note: Three appearances in EFL Trophy, three appearances in the League One Play-Offs)	0	50	6
Bradford City	Total		73	6	6	0	2	0	7	0	88	6
Charlton Athletic	2017–18	League One	27	1	2	1	0	0	2	0	31	2
Charlton Athletic	2018–19	League One	22	1	3	1	1	0	3 (Note: Appearances in the EFL Trophy)	0	29	2
Charlton Athletic	Total		49	2	5	2	1	0	5	0	60	4
Gillingham	2019–20	League One	18	0	1	0	1	0	3	0	23	0
Northampton Town	2019–20	League Two	7	0	0	0	—		1 (Note: Appearance(s) in the League Two play-offs)	0	8	0
Northampton Town	2020–21	League One	29	1	1	0	1	0	2	1	33	2
Northampton Town	Total		36	1	1	0	1	0	3	1	41	2
Crawley Town	2021–22	League Two	18	0	0	0	—		2	0	20	0
Crawley Town	2022–23	League Two	0	0	0	0	1	0	3	1	4	1
Crawley Town	Total		18	0	0	0	1	0	5	1	24	1
Maidstone United	2022–23	National League	11	0	0	0	—		1 (Note: Appearance(s) in the FA Trophy)	0	12	0
Carshalton Athletic	2023–24	Isthmian League; Premier Division	34	4	5	1	—		2 (Note: 1 appearance in the FA Trophy and 1 appearance in the Surrey Senior Cup)	0	41	5
Dulwich Hamlet	2024–25	Isthmian League; Premier Division	31	1	1	0	—		3 (Note: 1 appearance in the FA Trophy, 1 appearance in the Alan Turvey Trophy and 1 appearance in the London Senior Cup)	0	35	1
Beckenham Town	2025–26	Isthmian League; South East Division	29	3	0	0	—		0	0	29	3
Beckenham Town	2026–27	Southern Counties East; Premier Division	0	0	0	0	—		0	0	0	0
Beckenham Town	Total		29	3	0	0	0	0	0	0	29	3
Career total			483	36	27	3	12	0	44	6	566	45

== Honours ==
Charlton Athletic

- EFL League One play-offs: 2019

Northampton Town

- EFL League Two play-offs: 2020

Individual

- Bradford City Player of the Year: 2016–17
