= Michael Harding (soccer) =

American soccer player (born 2001)

Personal information
- Full name: Michael Joshua Francis Harding
- Date of birth: October 18, 2001 (age 25)
- Place of birth: Washington, D.C., United States
- Height: 1.75 m (5 ft 9 in)
- Position: Forward

Team information
- Current team: Flackwell Heath

Youth career
- Carib SSFC
- –2019: Northampton Town

Senior career*
| Years | Team | Apps | (Gls) |
| 2019–2020 | Northampton Town | 0 | (0) |
| 2020 | → Kettering Town (loan) | 1 | (0) |
| 2020–2021 | St Ives Town | 4 | (0) |
| 2021–2022 | Beaconsfield Town | | |
| 2022–2023 | Barwell | 6 | (0) |
| 2023 | Risborough | 12 | (5) |
| 2023– | Flackwell Heath | 0 | (0) |
- * Club domestic league appearances and goals as of 20:00, January 1, 2024 (UTC)

Michael Joshua Francis Harding (born October 18, 2001) is an American soccer player who plays as a forward for side Flackwell Heath.

== Career ==
=== Northampton Town ===
Harding made his first-team debut for Northampton Town on December 3, 2019, coming on as a 69th-minute substitute in a 2–1 defeat at Portsmouth in the EFL Trophy.

=== Kettering Town ===
On January 1, 2020, he joined Kettering Town on work experience.

=== St Ives Town ===
Harding signed for Southern League Premier Division Central side St Ives Town on October 26, 2020.

=== Beaconsfield Town ===
On November 2, 2021, it was confirmed that Harding had signed for Southern League Premier Division South side Beaconsfield Town.

=== Barwell ===
Harding signed for Southern League Premier Division Central side Barwell on July 30, 2022. He made his debut for Barwell on August 6, in a Southern League Premier Division Central fixture at home to Hitchin Town, the match finished 2–1 to the visitors.

== Career statistics ==
As of match played August 6, 2022

Appearances and goals by club, season and competition
| Club | Season | League | | | National cup | | League cup | | Other | | Total | |
| Club | Season | Division | Apps | Goals | Apps | Goals | Apps | Goals | Apps | Goals | Apps | Goals |
|---|---|---|---|---|---|---|---|---|---|---|---|---|
| Northampton Town | 2019–20 | League Two | 0 | 0 | 0 | 0 | 0 | 0 | 1 (Note: Appearances in the EFL Trophy) | 0 | 0 | 0 |
| Kettering Town (loan) | 2019–20 | National League North | 1 | 0 | 0 | 0 | — | | 0 | 0 | 1 | 0 |
| St Ives Town | 2020–21 | Southern League Premier Division Central | 0 | 0 | 0 | 0 | — | | 3 (Note: Appearances in the FA Trophy) | 0 | 3 | 0 |
| St Ives Town | 2021–22 | Southern League Premier Division Central | 4 | 0 | 0 | 0 | — | | 0 | 0 | 4 | 0 |
| Beaconsfield Town | 2021–22 | Southern League Premier Division South | — | | — | | — | | — | | — | |
| Barwell | 2022–23 | Southern League Premier Division Central | 1 | 0 | 0 | 0 | — | | 0 | 0 | 1 | 0 |
| Career total | | | 6 | 0 | 0 | 0 | 0 | 0 | 4 | 0 | 10 | 0 |
