= Ryan Hughes (footballer) =

English footballer (born 2001)

Personal information
- Full name: Ryan Annesley Hughes
- Date of birth: 24 April 2001 (age 25)
- Place of birth: Burton upon Trent, England
- Position: Defender

Team information
- Current team: AFC Rushden & Diamonds

Youth career
- 2011–2018: Northampton Town

Senior career*
Years	Team	Apps	(Gls)
2018–2020	Northampton Town	1	(0)
2018–2019	→ St Neots Town (loan)	21	(0)
2019	→ AFC Rushden & Diamonds (loan)	4	(0)
2020	→ Banbury United (loan)	2	(0)
2020	→ Corby Town (loan)	1	(0)
2020–	AFC Rushden & Diamonds	86	(6)
- * Club domestic league appearances and goals as of 22:00, 8 July 2022 (UTC)

Ryan Annesley Hughes (born 24 April 2001) is an English footballer who plays for Northern Premier League Division One Midlands side AFC Rushden & Diamonds, where he plays as a defender.

== Club career ==
=== Northampton Town ===
Hughes joined the youth-team at Northampton Town as a ten-year old in 2011. On 22 December 2018, he joined Southern League Premier Division Central side St Neots Town on a work experience loan deal. He made his "Saints" debut later that day, in a 2–1 defeat to Stratford Town at Rowley Park. He returned to Sixfields to make his debut for the "Cobblers" in a 3–1 defeat at Cheltenham Town on 23 March 2019. He joined AFC Rushden & Diamonds on a one-month loan on 11 October 2019. Hughes was recalled in January 2020. On 9 January 2020, Hughes joined Banbury United on a one-month loan. On 6 March 2020, he joined Corby Town on a one-month loan. He has Now joined ON Cheneks

=== AFC Rushden & Diamonds ===
In August 2020, Hughes re-joined Rushden & Diamonds, this time on a permanent basis.

On 1 July 2022, Hughes, along with teammates Jesse Akubuine, Patrick Casey and Connor Furlong were named as the first four players to commit to AFC Rushden & Diamonds for the 2022–23 season.

== Statistics ==
As of 23 April 2022

Club	Season	League			FA Cup		EFL Cup		Other		Total	
Club	Season	Division	Apps	Goals	Apps	Goals	Apps	Goals	Apps	Goals	Apps	Goals
Northampton Town	2018–19	EFL League Two	1	0	0	0	0	0	0	0	1	0
St Neots Town (loan)	2018–19	Southern League Premier Division Central	22	0	0	0	—		2 (Note: Appearance(s) in the Huntingdonshire Senior Cup)	0	24	0
Northampton Town	2019–20	EFL League Two	0	0	0	0	0	0	0	0	0	0
AFC Rushden & Diamonds (loan)	2019–20	Southern League Premier Division Central	4	0	0	0	—		1 (Note: Appearance(s) in FA Trophy)	0	5	0
Banbury United (loan)	2019–20	Southern League Premier Division Central	2	0	0	0	—		0	0	2	0
Corby Town (loan)	2019–20	Southern League Division One Central	1	0	0	0	—		0	0	1	0
AFC Rushden & Diamonds	2020–21	Southern League Premier Division Central	3	1	0	0	—		0	0	3	1
AFC Rushden & Diamonds	2021–22	Southern League Premier Division Central	16	3	1	0	—		5 (Note: Three appearances in Northamptonshire Senior Cup) (Note: One appearance in Southern League Cup) (Note: One appearance in FA Trophy)	0	22	3
AFC Rushden & Diamonds	2022–23	Southern League Premier Division Central	0	0	0	0	—		0	0	0	0
Career total			49	4	1	0	0	0	8	0	58	4
