= Jordan Turnbull =

English footballer (born 1994)

Personal information
- Full name: Jordan Robert Turnbull
- Date of birth: 30 October 1994 (age 32)
- Place of birth: Trowbridge, England
- Height: 1.85 m (6 ft 1 in)
- Position: Defender

Team information
- Current team: Tranmere Rovers
- Number: 4

Youth career
- –2007: Swindon Town
- 2007–2013: Southampton

Senior career*
Years	Team	Apps	(Gls)
2013–2016	Southampton	0	(0)
2014–2016	→ Swindon Town (loan)	86	(1)
2016–2018	Coventry City	36	(0)
2017–2018	→ Partick Thistle (loan)	19	(0)
2018–2020	Northampton Town	76	(5)
2020–2022	Salford City	79	(4)
2022–	Tranmere Rovers	138	(6)

International career
2013	England U19	2	(0)
2015	England U20	1	(0)
- * Club domestic league appearances and goals as of 06:10, 3 October 2026 (UTC)

Jordan Robert Turnbull (born 30 October 1994) is an English professional footballer who plays as a central defender for EFL League Two club Tranmere Rovers.

Turnbull began his career with the academy of Southampton, signing his first professional contract in 2013 and spending two seasons on loan at Swindon Town. He signed for Coventry City in 2016, and won the EFL Trophy in 2017 before suffering relegation. After spending six months on loan in Scotland with Partick Thistle, Turnbull returned to England and signed for Northampton Town. Having achieved promotion in 2020, he left the club to sign for Salford. In July 2022, Turnbull signed for Tranmere Rovers.

Internationally, Turnbull represented his country for the U19 and U20 teams.

== Career ==
=== Southampton ===
Turnbull started his career within the youth system at Swindon Town but later joined Southampton Academy. He turned professional with Southampton, and signed a two-year extension in 2013 after making the step-up to Saints under-21 side. During his first season on loan at Swindon, he signed a contract extension to keep him at the club until 2018.

==== Loans to Swindon Town ====
After being permission to play in a friendly against Leeds United during pre-season, Turnbull joined Swindon Town on a season-long loan on 8 August 2014. He made his debut on the opening day of Swindon's 2014–15 campaign at home to Scunthorpe United, his first appearance in the English Football League. By November, Turnbull had played every minute of the season, and in an interview with the Swindon Advertiser, he said "I feel a lot more confident and I feel like I've grown as a player already", adding that playing against fully professional players had aided his development.

Turnbull scored his first goal for Swindon in a 3–3 home draw against Walsall in April. For his impressive performances he was voted as Swindon's "Player of the Season". Swindon reached the play-off final, where they were defeated 4–0 by Preston North End.

On 3 August 2015, Turnbull joined Swindon Town for another season-long loan spell. In the 2015–16 he played at left back on many occasions due to a centre half partnership formed between Adam El-Abd and Raphael Rossi Branco. Overall, Turnbull played 97 times for The Robins in all competitions.

=== Coventry City ===
On 15 August 2016, Turnbull joined Coventry City on a three-year deal for an undisclosed fee. He made his debut on 20 August in a 3–1 defeat at Bradford City, when he was sent off in the 66th minute after he pulled down Billy Clarke.

He scored his first goals for Coventry when he scored twice in an EFL Trophy tie against West Ham Under-23s on 30 August 2016. He played five games in Coventry's run to the final, where Coventry defeated Oxford United 2–1 at Wembley Stadium to win their first trophy in 30 years. Turnbull played the final alongside Chris Stokes, a former teammate at Trowbridge Town, and said the day was "just a whirlwind and it was an unbelievable experience", and that winning the trophy alongside Stokes was a "special moment".

After Coventry suffered relegation at the end of the season, Turnbull was expected to activate a clause in his contract which allowed him to leave, but on 31 July, the deadline to trigger the clause, he left on loan to Partick Thistle.

==== Loan to Partick Thistle ====
Turnbull joined Scottish Premiership club Partick Thistle on a one-year loan deal on 31 July 2017. After making 21 appearances in all competitions for The Jags, Turnbull was recalled from his loan in January 2018.

=== Northampton Town ===
The day after being recalled, Turnbull joined Northampton Town, for an undisclosed fee; the Coventry Telegraph reported there was no initial fee, but Turnbull had a sell-on clause should Northampton receive a fee for him as part of a future transfer. Signed by manager Jimmy Floyd Hasselbaink due to injuries to defenders Aaron Pierre and Leon Barnett, Turnbull had scored two goals against The Cobblers the previous season for Coventry. Despite being signed a cover for injuries, Hasselbaink said it wasn't a short-term signing, praising him for his experience and versatility.

During his first full season at the club, Turnbull failed to start a game until October, but went on to make 34 appearances in all competitions following the sacking of manager Dean Austin, playing both as a defender and in centre-midfield. Continuing to play in midfield during the 2019–20 season, Turnbull began picking up regular bookings, and was suspended having received five yellow cards in eight games. Turnbull was reverted to the defence with manager Keith Curle changing the formation of the team to a 3–4–3, and was a regular during the first half of the campaign.

He missed three games between January and February 2020 after suffering a hip injury in an FA Cup match against Derby County. He left the club on a free transfer in 2020, with Curle explaining that financial restructuring at the club meant Northampton couldn't afford to keep Turnbull on his current wages.

=== Salford City ===
In July 2020 he signed for Salford City on a two-year contract.

Turnbull was offered a new contract at the end of the 2021–22 season, opting instead to leave the club.

=== Tranmere Rovers ===
On 26 July, Turnbull signed for Tranmere Rovers on a two-year deal.

== International career ==
Turnbull has represented England at under-19 and under-20 level.

== Career statistics ==
As of match played 5 September 2026

Appearances and goals by club, season and competition
Club	Season	League			National cup		League cup		Other		Total	
Club	Season	Division	Apps	Goals	Apps	Goals	Apps	Goals	Apps	Goals	Apps	Goals
Southampton	2014–15	Premier League	0	0	0	0	0	0	—		0	0
Southampton	2015–16	Premier League	0	0	0	0	0	0	—		0	0
Southampton	Total		0	0	0	0	0	0	0	0	0	0
Swindon Town (loan)	2014–15	League One	44	1	1	0	2	0	4 (Note: Two appearances in Football League Trophy and two in League One play-offs)	0	51	1
Swindon Town (loan)	2015–16	League One	42	0	1	0	1	0	2 (Note: Appearances in Football League Trophy)	0	46	0
Swindon Town (loan)	Total		86	1	2	0	3	0	6	0	97	1
Coventry City	2016–17	League One	36	0	3	0	0	0	7 (Note: Appearance(s) in EFL Trophy)	2	46	2
Coventry City	2017–18	League Two	0	0	0	0	0	0	0	0	0	0
Coventry City	Total		36	0	3	0	0	0	7	2	46	2
Partick Thistle (loan)	2017–18	Scottish Premiership	19	0	0	0	2	0	—		21	0
Northampton Town	2017–18	League One	14	0	0	0	0	0	0	0	14	0
Northampton Town	2018–19	League Two	31	0	1	0	1	0	5	0	38	0
Northampton Town	2019–20	League Two	31	5	4	0	1	0	6 (Note: Three appearances in EFL Trophy and three in League Two play-offs)	0	42	5
Northampton Town	Total		76	5	5	0	2	0	11	0	94	5
Salford City	2020–21	League Two	42	1	2	0	2	0	4	0	50	1
Salford City	2021–22	League Two	37	3	2	1	1	1	3	1	43	6
Salford City	Total		79	4	4	1	3	1	7	1	93	7
Tranmere Rovers	2022–23	League Two	39	3	0	0	2	0	1	1	42	4
Tranmere Rovers	2023–24	League Two	36	2	1	0	1	0	2	0	40	2
Tranmere Rovers	2024–25	League Two	44	1	1	0	1	0	3	0	49	1
Tranmere Rovers	2025–26	League Two	14	0	0	0	1	0	1	1	16	1
Tranmere Rovers	2026–27	League Two	5	0	0	0	1	0	0	0	6	0
Tranmere Rovers	Total		138	6	2	0	6	0	7	2	153	8
Career total			434	16	15	1	16	1	38	5	504	23

== Honours ==
Coventry City

- EFL Trophy: 2016–17

Northampton Town

- EFL League Two play-offs: 2020

Salford City

- EFL Trophy: 2019–20

Individual

- EFL League Two Team of the Season: 2021–22
