= Ryan Watson (footballer) =

English footballer (born 1993)

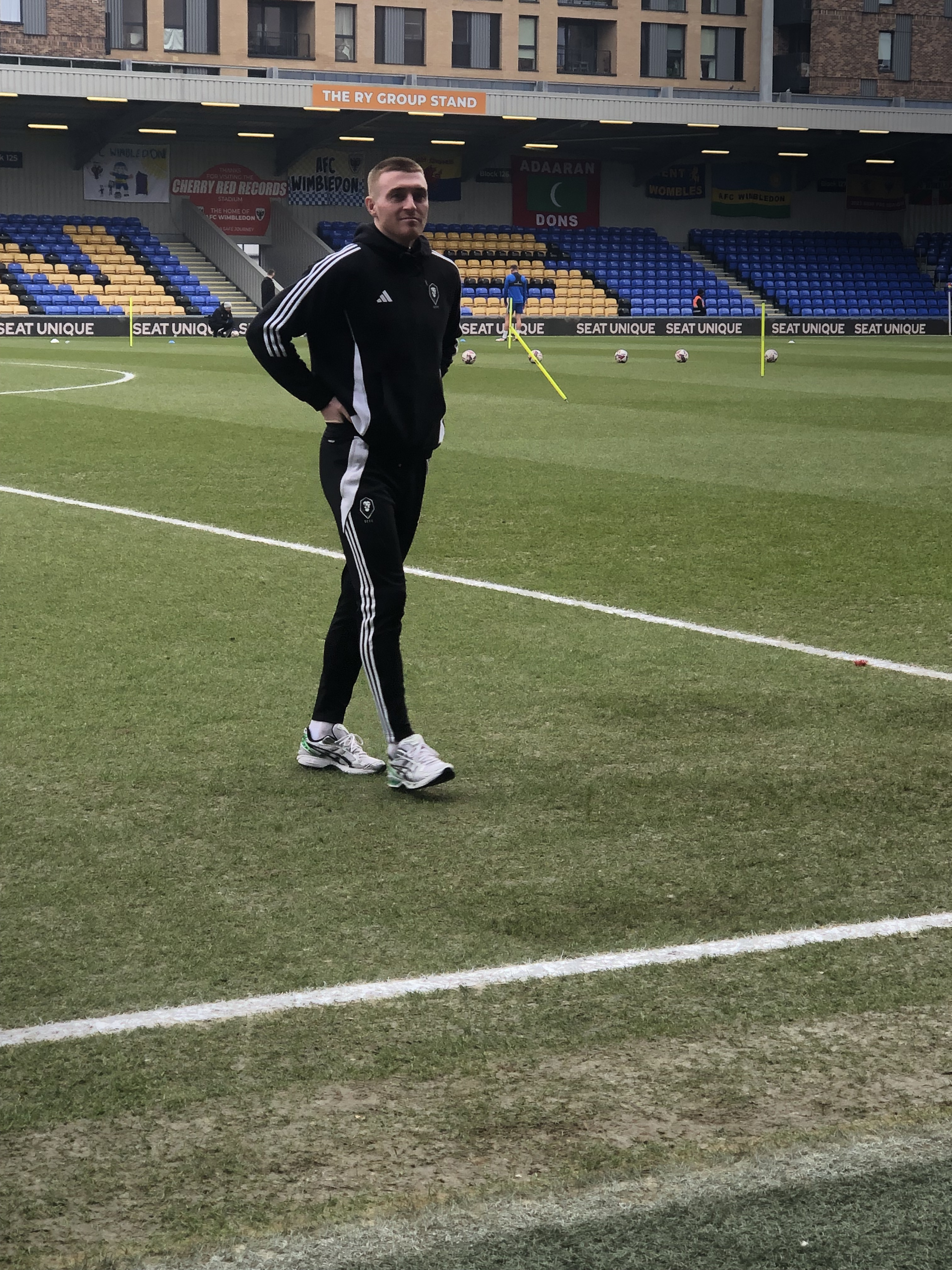
- Ryan Watson in 2025.

Personal information
- Full name: Ryan James Watson
- Date of birth: 7 July 1993 (age 33)
- Place of birth: Crewe, England
- Height: 1.85 m (6 ft 1 in)
- Position: Midfielder

Team information
- Current team: Tranmere Rovers
- Number: 44

Youth career
- –2010: Everton
- 2010–2011: Wigan Athletic

Senior career*
Years	Team	Apps	(Gls)
2011–2013	Wigan Athletic	0	(0)
2012	→ Accrington Stanley (loan)	0	(0)
2013–2016	Leicester City	0	(0)
2014	→ Northampton Town (loan)	5	(0)
2015	→ Northampton Town (loan)	11	(0)
2016–2018	Barnet	47	(2)
2018–2019	Milton Keynes Dons	22	(0)
2019–2021	Northampton Town	64	(13)
2021–2022	Tranmere Rovers	16	(1)
2022–2025	Salford City	107	(18)
2026–	Tranmere Rovers	0	(0)
- * Club domestic league appearances and goals as of 14:36, 7 January 2024 (UTC)

Ryan James Watson (born 7 July 1993) is an English professional footballer who plays as a midfielder for Tranmere Rovers.

== Career ==
=== Wigan Athletic ===
After an initial spell with the academy of Everton, Watson joined the academy of Wigan Athletic in 2010. He signed professional terms in 2011 and played for the team's development squad throughout the 2011–12 season. After a brief loan spell with League Two club Accrington Stanley, Watson was one of ten players released by Wigan at the end of the 2012–13 season.

=== Leicester City ===
Watson signed a one-year deal with then Championship club Leicester City in September 2013, having impressed on trial with the club's development squad. Having continued to impress for the club's reserve team, Watson signed a two-year contract extension in June 2014. On 26 August 2014, Watson made his first team debut for the club, starting in a second round League Cup home defeat to Shrewsbury Town.

After joining Northampton Town on loan initially until January 2015, Watson suffered a cruciate ligament injury after only five appearances for the League Two club, and returned to Leicester City for treatment in October 2014. The injury would rule him out of action for the remainder of the 2014–15 season. Watson re-joined Northampton Town on loan at the beginning of the 2015–16 season, and went on to make fifteen appearances for the club, scoring a single goal in a 3–2 Football League Trophy first round win against Colchester United on 1 September 2015.

Following the expiry of his loan, Watson returned to Leicester City in January 2016 and continued to play for the club's reserve team. He captained the side in a 1–1 draw with Middlesbrough on 25 January 2016. At the end of the season, Watson was among seven players released by the club.

=== Barnet ===
On 1 July 2016, Watson joined then League Two club Barnet. After two seasons with the club, Watson was released at the end of the 2017–18 season having scored two goals in 52 appearances.

=== Milton Keynes Dons ===
On 20 June 2018, Watson joined newly-relegated League Two club Milton Keynes Dons on a one-year deal effective from 1 July 2018. He scored his first goal for the club on 14 August 2018, in a 3–0 EFL Cup first round home win over Charlton Athletic. Following limited first team opportunities, Watson was one of ten players released by the club at the end of the 2018–19 season.

=== Northampton Town ===
On 3 June 2019, Watson joined Northampton Town on a free transfer effective from 1 July 2019, having previously played for the club across two loan spells. He finished 2020/21 as player of the season and top goal scorer but chose not to sign a new contract at Northampton.

=== Tranmere Rovers ===
On 19 June 2021, Watson joined Tranmere Rovers on a two-year deal.

=== Salford City ===
On 14 January 2022, Watson signed an 18-month contract with League Two side Salford City after joining for an undisclosed fee.

On 12 May 2025, the club announced he would be released in June when his contract expires.

=== Return to Tranmere Rovers ===
On 26 March 2026, Watson signed for former club Tranmere Rovers on a short-term contract.

== Career statistics ==
As of match played 28 February 2023

Appearances and goals by club, season and competition
Club	Season	League			FA Cup		League Cup		Other (Note: Includes appearances in EFL Trophy.)		Total	
Club	Season	Division	Apps	Goals	Apps	Goals	Apps	Goals	Apps	Goals	Apps	Goals
Wigan Athletic	2011–12	Premier League	0	0	0	0	0	0	—		0	0
Wigan Athletic	2012–13	Premier League	0	0	0	0	0	0	—		0	0
Wigan Athletic	Total		0	0	0	0	0	0	—		0	0
Accrington Stanley (loan)	2012–13	League Two	0	0	—		0	0	1 (Note: Appearance(s) in the EFL Trophy.)	0	1	0
Leicester City	2013–14	Championship	0	0	0	0	0	0	—		0	0
Leicester City	2014–15	Premier League	0	0	0	0	1	0	—		1	0
Leicester City	2015–16	Premier League	0	0	—		—		—		0	0
Leicester City	Total		0	0	0	0	1	0	—		1	0
Northampton Town (loan)	2014–15	League Two	5	0	—		—		0	0	5	0
Northampton Town (loan)	2015–16	League Two	11	0	1	0	1	0	2	1	15	1
Barnet	2016–17	League Two	19	1	1	0	1	0	1	0	22	1
Barnet	2017–18	League Two	28	1	1	0	0	0	1	0	30	1
Barnet	Total		47	2	2	0	1	0	2	0	52	2
Milton Keynes Dons	2018–19	League Two	22	0	0	0	2	1	3	0	27	1
Northampton Town	2019–20	League Two	25	5	4	1	1	0	6 (Note: Three appearances in League Two play-offs)	1 (Note: One goal in League Two play-offs)	36	7
Northampton Town	2020–21	League One	39	8	0	0	2	1	4	0	45	9
Northampton Town	Total		80	13	5	1	4	1	12	2	101	17
Tranmere Rovers	2021–22	League Two	16	1	2	0	1	0	3	1	22	2
Salford City	2021–22	League Two	23	4	0	0	0	0	0	0	23	4
Salford City	2022–23	League Two	34	7	2	0	1	0	5	0	42	7
Salford City	Total		57	11	2	0	1	0	5	0	65	11
Career total			222	27	11	1	10	2	26	3	269	33

== Honours ==
Northampton Town

- League Two: 2015–16; play-offs: 2020

Milton Keynes Dons

- EFL League Two third-place promotion: 2018–19
