= Michael Harriman =

English footballer (born 1992)

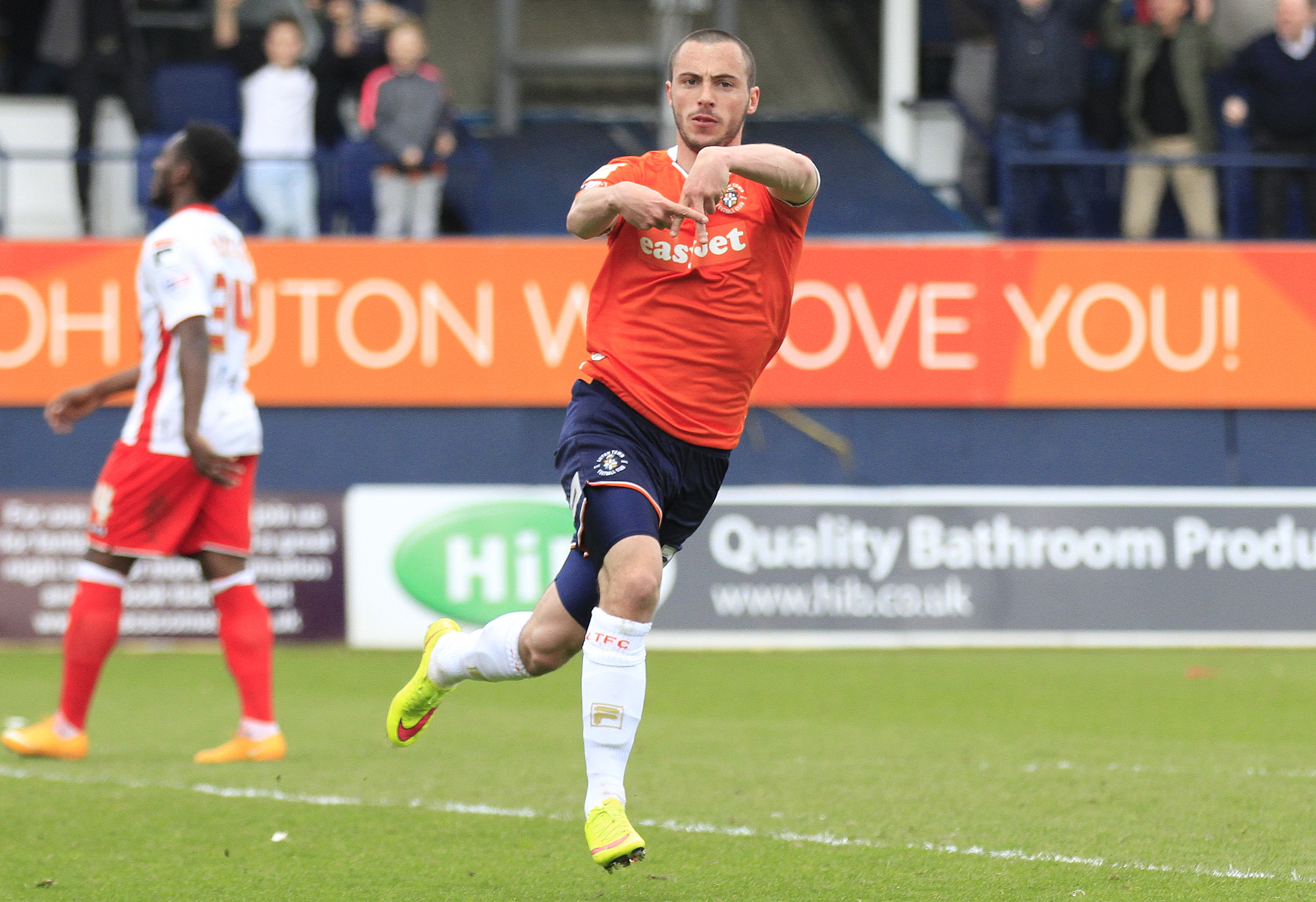
- Harriman goal celebration for Luton Town

Personal information
- Full name: Michael Grant Harriman
- Date of birth: 23 October 1992 (age 34)
- Place of birth: Chichester, England
- Height: 5 ft 8 in (1.73 m)
- Position: Defender

Youth career
- 2003–2011: Queens Park Rangers

Senior career*
Years	Team	Apps	(Gls)
2011–2016	Queens Park Rangers	2	(0)
2011	→ St Albans City (loan)	10	(0)
2013	→ Wycombe Wanderers (loan)	20	(0)
2013–2014	→ Gillingham (loan)	34	(1)
2014–2015	→ Luton Town (loan)	35	(1)
2015–2016	→ Wycombe Wanderers (loan)	23	(5)
2016–2019	Wycombe Wanderers	102	(3)
2019–2022	Northampton Town	56	(0)
2022–2023	Bedford Town	4	(0)
2023–2025	AFC Rushden & Diamonds	32	(0)

International career
2009–2010	Republic of Ireland U18	4	(0)
2011	Republic of Ireland U19	1	(0)
2013	Republic of Ireland U21	4	(0)

Managerial career
- 2023–2025: AFC Rushden & Diamonds
- * Club domestic league appearances and goals as of 16:04, 28 May 2025 (UTC)

Michael Grant Harriman (born 23 October 1992) is a former professional footballer who played as a defender. He was most recently manager of AFC Rushden & Diamonds.

== Career ==
=== Queens Park Rangers ===
Harriman made his professional debut on 23 August 2011 after being introduced as a 31st-minute substitute for Bradley Orr in a 2–0 defeat at home to Rochdale in the League Cup second round. This was followed by his Premier League debut four days later in a 2–0 defeat away to Wigan Athletic, coming on as a 61st-minute substitute for Fitz Hall.

On 10 November 2011, Harriman was loaned to Southern League Premier Division club St Albans City for one month. He made his debut for St Albans two days later in a 4–1 win at home to Evesham United, in which he assisted two goals from Paul Furlong. Harriman finished the loan with 10 appearances.

He signed for League Two club Wycombe Wanderers on a one-month youth loan on 1 January 2013, making his debut later that day as a 78th-minute substitute in a 1–0 defeat at home to Exeter City. Harriman's loan was extended on 29 January until the end of 2012–13, which he finished with 20 appearances.

Harriman joined League One club Gillingham on 5 August 2013 on a 28-day emergency loan, which would be extended until January 2014. The loan was extended until the end of the season on 7 January 2014, having made 24 appearances up to that point in 2013–14. Harriman scored his first professional goal in a 2–0 win at home to Swindon Town on 18 January and completed the loan spell with one goal from 37 appearances.

On 9 October 2014, Harriman joined League Two club Luton Town on a 28-day emergency loan. The loan was extended for a further month on 7 November, which would be extended for a third month on 8 December. Harriman scored his first goal for Luton in a 2–1 defeat away to Cambridge United in the FA Cup third round on 3 January 2015. His loan was extended until the end of 2014–15 on 16 January. Harriman scored Luton's second goal in a 2–0 victory at home to Stevenage on 2 May, though they missed out on the play-offs to finish the season in eighth place. He completed the loan spell with 39 appearances and two goals.

=== Wycombe Wanderers ===
On 10 July 2015, Harriman rejoined Wycombe Wanderers on loan until the end of January 2016. On 6 January 2016, Harriman signed for Wycombe permanently on a three-and-a-half-year contract for an undisclosed fee. Harriman was released when his contract expired at the end of the 2018–19 season.

=== Northampton Town ===
Harriman signed for League Two club Northampton Town on 4 September 2019 on a short-term contract until January 2020. He scored his first goal for Northampton in an EFL Trophy second round tie against Portsmouth on 3 December, in which they were beaten 2–1 away. Harriman was released by the club at the end of the 2021–22 season.

=== Non-League ===
On 7 October 2022, Harriman signed for Southern League Premier Division Central club Bedford Town.

In March 2023, he joined league rivals AFC Rushden & Diamonds.

== Managerial career ==
In October 2023, Harriman was appointed manager of AFC Rushden & Diamonds having held the role of player-coach since the summer. He departed the club by mutual consent in May 2025.

== Career statistics ==
As of end of 2024–25 season

Appearances and goals by club, season and competition
Club	Season	League			FA Cup		League Cup		Other		Total	
Club	Season	Division	Apps	Goals	Apps	Goals	Apps	Goals	Apps	Goals	Apps	Goals
Queens Park Rangers	2011–12	Premier League	1	0	0	0	1	0	—		2	0
Queens Park Rangers	2012–13	Premier League	1	0	0	0	0	0	—		1	0
Queens Park Rangers	2013–14	Championship	0	0	—		—		—		0	0
Queens Park Rangers	2014–15	Premier League	0	0	—		0	0	—		0	0
Queens Park Rangers	2015–16	Championship	—		—		—		—		0	0
Queens Park Rangers	Total		2	0	0	0	1	0	—		3	0
St Albans City (loan)	2011–12	Southern League Premier Division	10	0	—		—		—		10	0
Wycombe Wanderers (loan)	2012–13	League Two	20	0	—		—		—		20	0
Gillingham (loan)	2013–14	League One	34	1	1	0	1	0	1 (Note: Appearance in Football League Trophy)	0	37	1
Luton Town (loan)	2014–15	League Two	35	1	4	1	—		—		39	2
Wycombe Wanderers	2015–16	League Two	45	7	3	1	1	0	0	0	49	8
Wycombe Wanderers	2016–17	League Two	38	0	2	0	1	0	5 (Note: Appearance(s) in EFL Trophy)	0	46	0
Wycombe Wanderers	2017–18	League Two	18	1	0	0	1	0	1	0	20	1
Wycombe Wanderers	2018–19	League One	24	0	0	0	2	0	2	0	28	0
Wycombe Wanderers	Total		125	8	5	1	5	0	8	0	143	9
Northampton Town	2019–20	League Two	21	0	4	0	—		5 (Note: Two appearances and one goal in EFL Trophy, three appearances in League Two play-offs)	1	30	1
Northampton Town	2020–21	League One	30	0	0	0	2	0	5	0	37	0
Northampton Town	2021–22	League Two	5	0	1	0	0	0	2	0	8	0
Northampton Town	Total		56	0	5	0	2	0	12	1	75	1
Bedford Town	2022–23	Southern League Premier Division Central	4	0	0	0	—		2 (Note: One appearance in FA Trophy, one appearance in Bedfordshire Senior Cup)	0	6	0
AFC Rushden & Diamonds	2022–23	Southern League Premier Division Central	5	0	0	0	—		0	0	5	0
AFC Rushden & Diamonds	2023–24	Northern Premier League Division One Midlands	23	0	1	0	—		1 (Note: Appearance(s) in FA Trophy)	0	25	0
AFC Rushden & Diamonds	2024–25	Northern Premier League Division One Midlands	4	0	0	0	—		0	0	4	0
AFC Rushden & Diamonds	Total		32	0	1	0	0	0	1	0	34	0
Career total			308	10	16	2	9	0	22	1	355	13

== Honours ==
Northampton Town

- EFL League Two play-offs: 2020
