= Matty Warburton =

English footballer

Personal information
- Full name: Matthew Thomas Warburton
- Date of birth: 24 May 1992 (age 34)
- Place of birth: Manchester, England
- Height: 5 ft 9 in (1.76 m)
- Position: Attacking midfielder

Team information
- Current team: Redditch United

Senior career*
Years	Team	Apps	(Gls)
2012–2013	Maine Road		
2013–2016	Curzon Ashton	98	(47)
2016–2017	Salford City	20	(2)
2017	Curzon Ashton	17	(13)
2017–2019	Stockport County	79	(34)
2019–2021	Northampton Town	22	(2)
2020–2021	→ Yeovil Town (loan)	17	(1)
2021–2023	FC Halifax Town	64	(15)
2023–2025	Solihull Moors	50	(7)
2025	King's Lynn Town	10	(0)
2025–	Redditch United	0	(0)
- * Club domestic league appearances and goals as of 14:10, 13 July 2025 (UTC)

Matthew Thomas Warburton (born 24 May 1992) is an English professional footballer who plays as an attacking midfielder for Southern League Premier Division Central club Redditch United.

== Career ==
After playing for Maine Road, Curzon Ashton, Salford City and Stockport County, in May 2019 it was announced that Warburton has signed a two-year contract with Northampton Town, starting in July 2019. Before joining Northampton, Warburton worked as a PE teacher at Ashton-on-Mersey School in Sale, Greater Manchester. On 3 August 2019, he made his professional debut in a 1–0 defeat against Walsall.

On 8 October 2020, Warburton signed for National League side Yeovil Town on loan until the end of the 2020–21 season.

On 11 May 2021 it was announced that he would leave Northampton when his contract expired at the end of the season.

On 1 August 2021, Warburton was announced to have signed for National League club FC Halifax Town on a free transfer. He scored his first goal for the club in their 3–0 National League win over Stockport County. He was awarded the National League Player of the Month award for December 2021 after three goals across the month. On 21 May 2023, he featured as a substitute in the 2023 FA Trophy Final as Halifax defeated Gateshead to lift the trophy for a second time, proving to be his final appearance for the club.

In May 2023, he agreed to join Solihull Moors on a two-year deal.

In February 2025, Warburton joined National League North side King's Lynn Town.

In July 2025, Warburton joined Southern League Premier Division South side Redditch United.

== Career statistics ==
As of end of 2024–25 season

Appearances and goals by club, season and competition
Club	Season	League			FA Cup		League Cup		Other		Total	
Club	Season	Division	Apps	Goals	Apps	Goals	Apps	Goals	Apps	Goals	Apps	Goals
Maine Road	2012–13	NWCFL Premier Division	~	~	~	~	—		2 (Note: Appearances in FA Vase)	2	~	~
Curzon Ashton	2013–14	NPL Division One North	40	27	5	3	—		6 (Note: Five appearances and two goals in FA Trophy, one appearances in Peter Swales Shield)	2	51	32
Curzon Ashton	2014–15	NPL Premier Division	21	8	2	1	—		1 (Note: Appearance in Manchester Premier Cup)	0	24	9
Curzon Ashton	2015–16	National League North	37	12	1	1	—		3 (Note: Appearances in FA Trophy)	1	41	14
Curzon Ashton	Total		98	47	8	5	—		10	3	116	55
Salford City	2016–17	National League North	20	2	2	0	—		4 (Note: Two appearances in FA Trophy, two appearances and four goals in Manchester Premier Cup)	4	26	6
Curzon Ashton	2016–17	National League North	17	13	—		—		—		17	13
Stockport County	2017–18	National League North	37	16	2	2	—		6	3	45	21
Stockport County	2018–19	National League North	42	18	4	3	—		8 (Note: Seven appearances and six goals in FA Trophy, one appearance in Cheshire Senior Cup)	6	54	27
Stockport County	Total		79	34	6	5	—		14	9	99	48
Northampton Town	2019–20	League Two	18	1	5	0	1	1	4 (Note: Appearance(s) in the EFL Trophy.)	0	28	2
Northampton Town	2020–21	League One	4	1	—		1	1	1	0	6	2
Northampton Town	Total		22	2	5	0	2	2	5	0	34	4
Yeovil Town (loan)	2020–21	National League	17	1	3	1	—		—		20	2
FC Halifax Town	2021–22	National League	41	13	4	1	—		4 (Note: Three appearances in FA Trophy and one appearance in National League play-offs)	0	49	14
FC Halifax Town	2022–23	National League	23	2	1	0	—		4	0	28	2
FC Halifax Town	Total		64	15	5	1	0	0	8	0	77	16
Solihull Moors	2023–24	National League	31	6	1	0	—		2	0	34	6
Solihull Moors	2024–25	National League	19	1	1	0	—		1	0	21	1
Solihull Moors	Total		50	7	2	0	0	0	3	0	55	7
King's Lynn Town	2024–25	National League North	10	0	0	0	—		1 (Note: Appearance(s) in National League North play-offs)	0	11	0
Career total			377	121	31	12	2	2	47	18	457	153

== Honours ==
Northampton Town

- EFL League Two play-offs: 2020

FC Halifax Town

- FA Trophy: 2022–23

Solihull Moors

- FA Trophy runner-up: 2023–24

Individual

- National League Player of the Month: December 2021
