= 2023–24 EFL Trophy =

Tournament details
- Country: England; Wales
- Teams: 64

Final positions
- Champions: Peterborough United (2nd title)
- Runners-up: Wycombe Wanderers

Tournament statistics
- Matches played: 127
- Goals scored: 413 (3.25 per match)
- Attendance: 293,253 (2,309 per match)
- Top goal scorer(s): (England) Tyler Smith; Bradford City (6 goals)

The 2023–24 EFL Trophy, known as the Bristol Street Motors Trophy (Note: It was known as the EFL Trophy during the group stage.) for sponsorship reasons, was the 43rd season in the history of the competition, and was a knock-out tournament for clubs in EFL League One and League Two, the third and fourth tiers of the English football league system, as well as the "Academy teams" of 15 Premier League and one Championship club with Category One status. For the first time since 1984, the competition lacked a sponsor. Following the expiration of Papa Johns's sponsorship contract, the EFL attempted to find a new sponsor but were unable to do so. On 2 November 2023, EFL announced they had reached a sponsorship agreement with car dealership brand Bristol Street Motors and the tournament's name was changed to reflect that from that point.

The defending champions were Bolton Wanderers who defeated Plymouth Argyle 4–0 in the previous season's final, but they were knocked out in the quarter-finals on penalties by Blackpool.

== Participating clubs ==
- 48 clubs from League One and League Two.
- 16 invited Category One Academy teams.

	League One	League Two	Academies
Clubs	Barnsley; Blackpool; Bolton Wanderers; Bristol Rovers; Burton Albion; Cambridge United; Carlisle United; Charlton Athletic; Cheltenham Town; Derby County; Exeter City; Fleetwood Town; Leyton Orient; Lincoln City; Northampton Town; Oxford United; Peterborough United; Port Vale; Portsmouth; Reading; Shrewsbury Town; Stevenage; Wigan Athletic; Wycombe Wanderers	Accrington Stanley; AFC Wimbledon; Barrow; Bradford City; Colchester United; Crawley Town; Crewe Alexandra; Doncaster Rovers; Forest Green Rovers; Gillingham; Grimsby Town; Harrogate Town; Mansfield Town; Milton Keynes Dons; Morecambe; Newport County; Notts County; Salford City; Stockport County; Sutton United; Swindon Town; Tranmere Rovers; Walsall; Wrexham	Arsenal; Aston Villa; Brighton & Hove Albion; Chelsea; Crystal Palace; Everton; Fulham; Leicester City; Liverpool; Manchester City; Manchester United; Newcastle United; Nottingham Forest; Tottenham Hotspur; West Ham United; Wolverhampton Wanderers
Total	24	24	16

== Eligibility criteria for players ==
For EFL clubs

- Minimum of four qualifying outfield players in their starting XI. A qualifying outfield player was one who met any of the following requirements:
  - Any player who started the previous or following first-team fixture.
  - Any player who is in the top 10 players at the club who has made the most starting appearances in league and domestic cup competitions this season.
  - Any player with forty or more first-team starting appearances in their career, including International matches.
  - Any player on loan from a Premier League club or any EFL Category One Academy club.
- A club can play any eligible goalkeeper in the competition.
- Any player out on a long loan term at a National League, National League North, or National League South team can play as long as the loaning team agree to allow the player to return for the match.

For invited teams

- Minimum of six players in the starting line-up who are aged under 21 on 30 June 2023.
- Maximum of two players on the team sheet who are aged over 21 and have also made forty or more senior appearances.

== Competition format ==
Group stage

- Sixteen groups of four teams will be organised on a regionalised basis.
- All groups will include one invited club.
- All clubs will play each other once, either home or away (academy sides will play all group matches away from home).
- Clubs will be awarded three points for a win and one point for a draw.
- In the event of a drawn game (after 90 minutes), a penalty shoot-out will be held with the winning team earning an additional point.
- Clubs expelled from the EFL will be knocked out of the tournament automatically.
- The top two teams in each group will progress to the knockout stage.

Knockout stage

- Rounds 2 and 3 of the competition will be drawn on a regionalised basis.
- In Round 2, the group winners will be seeded and the group runners-up will be unseeded in the draw.
- In Round 2, teams who played in the same group as each other in the group stage will be kept apart.

== Group stage ==
The group stage draw was finalised on 22 June 2023.

=== Northern section ===
==== Group A ====
Pos	Div	Team	Pld	W	PW	PL	L	GF	GA	GD	Pts	Qualification
1	L1	Blackpool	3	3	0	0	0	9	3	+6	9	Advance to Round 2
2	ACA	Liverpool U21	3	1	0	0	2	6	7	−1	3	Advance to Round 2
3	L2	Morecambe	3	1	0	0	2	4	6	−2	3	
4	L2	Barrow	3	1	0	0	2	3	6	−3	3	

Updated to match(es) played on 14 November 2023. Source: EFL.com

5 September 2023	Barrow	0–2	Blackpool	Barrow-in-Furness
19:00 BST (UTC+1)		Report	Carey 44'; Kouassi 85'	Stadium: Holker Street; Attendance: 1,436; Referee: Matthew Corlett

19 September 2023	Morecambe	0–3	Liverpool U21	Morecambe
19:00 BST (UTC+1)		Report	Musiałowski 13'; Scanlon 28'; Clark 39'	Stadium: Mazuma Stadium; Attendance: 1,607; Referee: Ollie Yates

10 October 2023	Blackpool	5–2	Liverpool U21	Blackpool
19:00 BST (UTC+1)	Morgan 45+3'; Kouassi 46', 75', 89'; Lyons 90+6'	Report	Glatzel 30'; Musiałowski 66'	Stadium: Bloomfield Road; Attendance: 2,683; Referee: Scott Simpson

10 October 2023	Morecambe	3–1	Barrow	Morecambe
19:00 BST (UTC+1)	Brown 38'; Rooney 58'; Smith 73'	Report	Whitfield 68'	Stadium: Mazuma Stadium; Attendance: 2,203; Referee: Simon Mather

7 November 2023	Barrow	2–1	Liverpool U21	Barrow-in-Furness
19:00 GMT	Etaluku 65'; Ogungbo 75'	Report	Musiałowski 29'	Stadium: Holker Street; Attendance: 1,463; Referee: Edward Duckworth

14 November 2023	Blackpool	2–1	Morecambe	Blackpool
19:00 GMT	Beesley 21', 46'	Report	Rawson 90+2'	Stadium: Bloomfield Road; Attendance: 1,829; Referee: Martin Woods

==== Group B ====
Pos	Div	Team	Pld	W	PW	PL	L	GF	GA	GD	Pts	Qualification
1	L2	Wrexham	3	3	0	0	0	6	1	+5	9	Advance to Round 2
2	L1	Port Vale	3	1	1	0	1	3	3	0	5	Advance to Round 2
3	L2	Crewe Alexandra	3	1	0	0	2	2	5	−3	3	
4	ACA	Newcastle United U21	3	0	0	1	2	2	4	−2	1	

Updated to match(es) played on 7 November 2023. Source: EFL.com

5 September 2023	Wrexham	1–0	Newcastle United U21	Wrexham
19:30 BST (UTC+1)	Dalby 13'	Report		Stadium: Racecourse Ground; Attendance: 7,988; Referee: Thomas Parsons

5 September 2023	Port Vale	1–0	Crewe Alexandra	Burslem
19:45 BST (UTC+1)	Garrity 18'	Report		Stadium: Vale Park; Attendance: 2,846; Referee: Steven Copeland

10 October 2023	Crewe Alexandra	0–3	Wrexham	Crewe
19:00 BST (UTC+1)		Report	Tunnicliffe 5'; Davies 13'; Young 73' (pen.)	Stadium: Gresty Road; Attendance: 3,751; Referee: Aaron Jackson

10 October 2023	Port Vale	1–1 (3–2 p)	Newcastle United U21	Burslem
19:00 BST (UTC+1)	Debrah 17'	Report	Stanton 90'	Stadium: Vale Park; Attendance: 1,197; Referee: Jacob Miles
	Penalties
	Garrity (penalty scored); Lowe (penalty scored); Shorrock (penalty missed); Walters (penalty missed); Clark (penalty scored)		(penalty scored) Diallo; (penalty missed) Stanton; (penalty missed) Crossley; (penalty scored) Huntley; (penalty missed) Ndiweni

7 November 2023	Wrexham	2–1	Port Vale	Wrexham
19:00 GMT	Mullin 70'; McClean 83'	Report	Thomas 31'	Stadium: Racecourse Ground; Attendance: 7,870; Referee: Lewis Smith

21 November 2023	Crewe Alexandra	2–1	Newcastle United U21	Crewe
19:45 GMT	Allport 47'; Evans 83'	Report	Huntley 60'	Stadium: Gresty Road; Attendance: 551

==== Group C ====
Pos	Div	Team	Pld	W	PW	PL	L	GF	GA	GD	Pts	Qualification
1	L2	Accrington Stanley	3	2	0	0	1	7	5	+2	6	Advance to Round 2
2	ACA	Nottingham Forest U21	3	2	0	0	1	5	3	+2	6	Advance to Round 2
3	L1	Carlisle United	3	1	0	0	2	2	3	−1	3	
4	L2	Harrogate Town	3	1	0	0	2	5	8	−3	3	

Updated to match(es) played on 14 November 2023. Source: EFL.com

5 September 2023	Accrington Stanley	1–0	Carlisle United	Accrington
19:45 BST (UTC+1)	Whelan 86' (o.g.)	Report		Stadium: Crown Ground; Attendance: 888; Referee: Scott Jackson

5 September 2023	Harrogate Town	2–1	Nottingham Forest U21	Harrogate
19:45 BST (UTC+1)	Thomson 56' (pen.); O'Connor 82'	Report	Osong 84'	Stadium: Wetherby Road; Attendance: 1,178; Referee: Edward Duckworth

10 October 2023	Carlisle United	0–2	Nottingham Forest U21	Carlisle
19:00 BST (UTC+1)		Report	Powell 69'; Perry 77'	Stadium: Brunton Park; Attendance: 1,268; Referee: Thomas Kirk

10 October 2023	Harrogate Town	3–5	Accrington Stanley	Harrogate
19:45 BST (UTC+1)	Folarin 35', 76'; Mattock 58'	Report	Trickett 27', 89'; Adedoyin 30', 37', 51'	Stadium: Wetherby Road; Attendance: 959; Referee: Marc Edwards

14 November 2023	Carlisle United	2–0	Harrogate Town	Carlisle
19:00 GMT	Gibson 3', 79'	Report		Stadium: Brunton Park; Attendance: 716; Referee: Dale Baines

21 November 2023	Accrington Stanley	1–2	Nottingham Forest U21	Accrington
19:45 GMT	Adedoyin 58'	Report	Thompson 18'; Larsson 39'	Stadium: Crown Ground; Attendance: 687

==== Group D ====
Pos	Div	Team	Pld	W	PW	PL	L	GF	GA	GD	Pts	Qualification
1	L1	Wigan Athletic	3	1	2	0	0	10	4	+6	7	Advance to Round 2
2	L1	Fleetwood Town	3	2	0	1	0	9	3	+6	7	Advance to Round 2
3	ACA	Leicester City U21	3	1	0	0	2	2	11	−9	3	
4	L2	Tranmere Rovers	3	0	0	1	2	0	3	−3	1	

Updated to match(es) played on 14 November 2023. Source: EFL.com

5 September 2023	Fleetwood Town	2–0	Tranmere Rovers	Fleetwood
19:00 BST (UTC+1)	Stockley 73' (pen.); Patterson 82'	Report		Stadium: Highbury Stadium; Attendance: 664; Referee: Scott Simpson

19 September 2023	Wigan Athletic	7–1	Leicester City U21	Wigan
19:00 BST (UTC+1)	Magennis 34' (pen.), 46'; Lang 57'; Young 60' (o.g.); McHugh 72'; Sze 85'; Stones 90+5'	Report	Raikhy 30'	Stadium: DW Stadium; Attendance: 2,073; Referee: Scott Simpson

10 October 2023	Wigan Athletic	3–3 (4–3 p)	Fleetwood Town	Wigan
19:00 BST (UTC+1)	Humphrys 55'; Stones 65'; Pearce 87'	Report	Tshimanga 43', 45+3'; Earl 90+3'	Stadium: DW Stadium; Attendance: Scott Tallis; Referee: 1,600
	Penalties
	Lang (penalty missed); Sze (penalty scored); Pearce (penalty missed); Clare (penalty scored); Stones (penalty scored); Hughes (penalty scored)		(penalty scored) Marriott; (penalty missed) Mayor; (penalty scored) Robertson; (penalty missed) Simons; (penalty scored) Earl; (penalty missed) Broom

10 October 2023	Tranmere Rovers	0–1	Leicester City U21	Birkenhead
19:00 BST (UTC+1)		Report	Thomas 9'	Stadium: Prenton Park; Attendance: 678; Referee: Adam Herczeg

7 November 2023	Fleetwood Town	4–0	Leicester City U21	Fleetwood
19:00 GMT	Broom 29', 40'; Johnson 49'; Graydon 86'	Report		Stadium: Highbury Stadium; Attendance: 425; Referee: Michael Barlow

14 November 2023	Tranmere Rovers	0–0 (5–6 p)	Wigan Athletic	Birkenhead
19:00 GMT		Report		Stadium: Prenton Park; Attendance: 1,142; Referee: Simon Mather
	Penalties
	Morris (penalty scored); Hughes (penalty scored); Jolley (penalty scored); Norris (penalty scored); Saunders (penalty missed); Taylor (penalty missed); Davies (penalty scored); Pike (penalty missed)		(penalty scored) Mcmanaman; (penalty scored) Humphrys; (penalty scored) Pearce; (penalty scored) Sze; (penalty missed) Stones; (penalty missed) Balagizi; (penalty scored) McHugh; (penalty scored) Watts

==== Group E ====
Pos	Div	Team	Pld	W	PW	PL	L	GF	GA	GD	Pts	Qualification
1	L1	Bolton Wanderers	3	3	0	0	0	13	1	+12	9	Advance to Round 2
2	L2	Stockport County	3	1	0	1	1	4	4	0	4	Advance to Round 2
3	L2	Salford City	3	1	0	0	2	5	9	−4	3	
4	ACA	Manchester United U21	3	0	1	0	2	5	13	−8	2	

Updated to match(es) played on 14 November 2023. Source: EFL.com

22 August 2023	Stockport County	1–1 (3–5 p)	Manchester United U21	Stockport
19:00 BST (UTC+1)	Olaofe 90+13' (pen.)	Report	Hugill 64'	Stadium: Edgeley Park; Attendance: 5,000; Referee: Matt Corlett
	Penalties
	Lemonheigh-Evans (penalty scored); Barry (penalty scored); Rydel (penalty missed); Olaofe (penalty scored)		(penalty scored) McNeill; (penalty scored) Shoretire; (penalty scored) Nolan; (penalty scored) Williams; (penalty scored) Wheatley

5 September 2023	Bolton Wanderers	3–0	Salford City	Horwich
19:45 BST (UTC+1)	Mendes Gomes 1'; Santos 12'; Morley 53'	Report		Stadium: Toughsheet Community Stadium; Attendance: 2,983; Referee: Aaron Jackson

26 September 2023	Bolton Wanderers	8–1	Manchester United U21	Horwich
19:45 BST (UTC+1)	Nlundulu 19', 48'; Sheehan 22', 38'; Jones 41'; Böðvarsson 64'; Khumbeni 74'; Matheson 84'	Report	Forson 67'	Stadium: Toughsheet Community Stadium; Attendance: 3,007; Referee: Scott Jackson

10 October 2023	Salford City	1–3	Stockport County	Salford
19:30 BST (UTC+1)	Dackers 3'	Report	Madden 20' (pen.), 52', 67'	Stadium: Moor Lane; Attendance: 1,355; Referee: David Bourne

31 October 2023	Salford City	4–3	Manchester United U21	Salford
19:30 GMT	McAleny 24'; Lund 27', 87' (pen.), 90+5' (pen.)	Report	Shoretire 7', 51'; Forson 47'	Stadium: Moor Lane; Attendance: 1,799; Referee: David Rock

14 November 2023	Stockport County	0–2	Bolton Wanderers	Stockport
19:30 GMT		Report	Böðvarsson 37', 45+1'	Stadium: Edgeley Park; Attendance: 3,427; Referee: Scott Oldham

==== Group F ====
Pos	Div	Team	Pld	W	PW	PL	L	GF	GA	GD	Pts	Qualification
1	L2	Bradford City	3	3	0	0	0	10	2	+8	9	Advance to Round 2
2	L1	Barnsley	3	2	0	0	1	6	6	0	6	Advance to Round 2
3	ACA	Manchester City U21	3	0	1	0	2	3	8	−5	2	
4	L2	Grimsby Town	3	0	0	1	2	3	6	−3	1	

Updated to match(es) played on 31 October 2023. Source: EFL.com

29 August 2023	Grimsby Town	2–2 (2–4 p)	Manchester City U21	Cleethorpes
19:30 BST (UTC+1)	Clifton 77'; Pyke 90+1'	Report	Dickson 9'; Ndala 28'	Stadium: Blundell Park; Attendance: 1,101
	Penalties
	Hunt (penalty scored); Driscoll-Glennon (penalty missed); Clifton (penalty scored); Gnahoua (penalty missed)		(penalty scored) Wright; (penalty scored) Galvez; (penalty scored) Heskey; (penalty scored) Samuel

5 September 2023	Barnsley	2–0	Grimsby Town	Barnsley
19:30 BST (UTC+1)	Dodgson 33'; Marsh 90+1'	Report		Stadium: Oakwell; Attendance: 2,439; Referee: Ruebyn Ricardo

26 September 2023	Barnsley	3–1	Manchester City U21	Barnsley
19:30 BST (UTC+1)	McCarthy 26'; Russell 31'; Nzondo 79'	Report	Dickson 43'	Stadium: Oakwell; Attendance: 2,051; Referee: Martin Woods

10 October 2023	Grimsby Town	1–2	Bradford City	Cleethorpes
19:30 BST (UTC+1)	Pyke 18'	Report	Kelly 16'; Osadebe 48'	Stadium: Blundell Park; Attendance: 747; Referee: Paul Howard

31 October 2023	Bradford City	3–0	Manchester City U21	Bradford
19:30 GMT	Smith 15', 36', 44'	Report		Stadium: Valley Parade; Attendance: 1,750; Referee: Ben Toner

21 November 2023	Bradford City	5–1	Barnsley	Bradford
19:30 GMT	Platt 2'; Cook 17'; Smith 35'; Richards 63'; Oduor 66'	Report	Cotter 77'	Stadium: Valley Parade; Attendance: 1,770

==== Group G ====
Pos	Div	Team	Pld	W	PW	PL	L	GF	GA	GD	Pts	Qualification
1	L1	Derby County	3	3	0	0	0	8	2	+6	9	Advance to Round 2
2	L1	Lincoln City	3	2	0	0	1	4	2	+2	6	Advance to Round 2
3	ACA	Wolverhampton Wanderers U21	3	1	0	0	2	3	7	−4	3	
4	L2	Notts County	3	0	0	0	3	2	6	−4	0	

Updated to match(es) played on 8 November 2023. Source: EFL.com

12 September 2023	Notts County	1–2	Wolverhampton Wanderers U21	Nottingham
19:45 BST (UTC+1)	Hubner 90+5' (o.g.)	Report	Hesketh 17'; Fraser 55'	Stadium: Meadow Lane; Attendance: 1,459; Referee: Paul Howard

19 September 2023	Derby County	2–0	Lincoln City	Derby
19:00 BST (UTC+1)	Barkhuizen 51'; Sibley 77'	Report		Stadium: Pride Park Stadium; Attendance: 2,726; Referee: Seb Stockbridge

10 October 2023	Lincoln City	2–0	Wolverhampton Wanderers U21	Lincoln
19:00 BST (UTC+1)	Adelakun 19'; Makama 90+3'	Report		Stadium: Sincil Bank; Attendance: 1,384; Referee: Scott Jackson

10 October 2023	Notts County	1–2	Derby County	Nottingham
19:00 BST (UTC+1)	Morias 78' (pen.)	Report	Sibley 20', 57'	Stadium: Meadow Lane; Attendance: 5,946; Referee: Christopher Pollard

7 November 2023	Lincoln City	2–0	Notts County	Lincoln
19:00 GMT	Burroughs 6'; Vale 67'	Report		Stadium: Sincil Bank; Attendance: 2,018; Referee: Aaron Jackson

8 November 2023	Derby County	4–1	Wolverhampton Wanderers U21	Derby
19:00 GMT	Collins 43', 55', 62'; Weston 79'	Report	Esen 49'	Stadium: Pride Park Stadium; Attendance: 1,952; Referee: Scott Simpson

==== Group H ====
Pos	Div	Team	Pld	W	PW	PL	L	GF	GA	GD	Pts	Qualification
1	L2	Doncaster Rovers	3	2	0	0	1	6	4	+2	6	Advance to Round 2
2	L1	Burton Albion	3	2	0	0	1	5	3	+2	6	Advance to Round 2
3	L2	Mansfield Town	3	1	0	0	2	4	5	−1	3	
4	ACA	Everton U21	3	1	0	0	2	1	4	−3	3	

Updated to match(es) played on 7 November 2023. Source: EFL.com

19 September 2023	Doncaster Rovers	2–0	Everton U21	Doncaster
19:00 BST (UTC+1)	Marsh 57'; Biggins 81'	Report		Stadium: Keepmoat Stadium; Attendance: 1,067

26 September 2023	Burton Albion	2–0	Everton U21	Burton upon Trent
19:00 BST (UTC+1)	Bennett 8'; Oshilaja 20'	Report		Stadium: Pirelli Stadium; Attendance: 473; Referee: Scott Tallis

10 October 2023	Mansfield Town	3–2	Doncaster Rovers	Mansfield
19:00 BST (UTC+1)	Gale 11' (pen.), 13'; Johnson 88'	Report	Close 38'; Ironside 64'	Stadium: Field Mill; Attendance: 1,486; Referee: Ruebyn Ricardo

7 November 2023	Doncaster Rovers	2–1	Burton Albion	Doncaster
19:00 GMT	Faal 18'; Hurst 55'	Report	Lubala 84'	Stadium: Keepmoat Stadium; Attendance: 1,068; Referee: Matthew Corlett

7 November 2023	Mansfield Town	0–1	Everton U21	Mansfield
19:00 GMT		Report	Chermiti 90+1' (pen.)	Stadium: Field Mill; Attendance: 819; Referee: Neil Hair

21 November 2023	Burton Albion	2–1	Mansfield Town	Burton upon Trent
19:00 GMT	Stockton 34'; Hamer 53'	Report	Cooper 21'	Stadium: Pirelli Stadium; Attendance: 855

=== Southern section ===
==== Group A ====
Pos	Div	Team	Pld	W	PW	PL	L	GF	GA	GD	Pts	Qualification
1	L2	Forest Green Rovers	3	1	1	1	0	4	1	+3	6	Advance to Round 2
2	ACA	Brighton & Hove Albion U21	3	1	1	1	0	3	2	+1	6	Advance to Round 2
3	L1	Shrewsbury Town	3	1	1	0	1	3	5	−2	5	
4	L2	Walsall	3	0	0	1	2	5	7	−2	1	

Updated to match(es) played on 14 November 2023. Source: EFL.com

22 August 2023	Walsall	2–3	Brighton & Hove Albion U21	Walsall
19:00 BST (UTC+1)	McEntee 27'; Knowles 86'	Report	Moran 13', 33'; Gordon 65' (o.g.)	Stadium: Bescot Stadium; Attendance: 1,780; Referee: Tom Parsons

5 September 2023	Forest Green Rovers	3–0	Shrewsbury Town	Nailsworth
19:00 BST (UTC+1)	Kadji 37'; Omotoye 61'; Stevens 65'	Report		Stadium: The New Lawn; Attendance: 709; Referee: Farai Hallam

19 September 2023	Shrewsbury Town	0–0 (4–1 p)	Brighton & Hove Albion U21	Shrewsbury
19:00 BST (UTC+1)		Report		Stadium: New Meadow; Attendance: 1,027; Referee: Paul Howard
	Penalties
	Bayliss (penalty scored); Bowman (penalty scored); Bennett (penalty scored); Anderson (penalty scored)		(penalty missed) Barrington; (penalty missed) O'Mahony; (penalty scored) Baker-Boaitey

10 October 2023	Walsall	1–1 (2–4 p)	Forest Green Rovers	Walsall
19:00 BST (UTC+1)	Hutchinson 67'	Report	Omotoye 51'	Stadium: Bescot Stadium; Attendance: 1,516; Referee: Stephen Parkinson
	Penalties
	Stirk (penalty missed); James-Taylor (penalty scored); McEntee (penalty scored); Johnson (penalty missed)		(penalty scored) Stevens; (penalty scored) Taylor; (penalty scored) Robson; (penalty scored) Bunker

7 November 2023	Forest Green Rovers	0–0 (2–4 p)	Brighton & Hove Albion U21	Nailsworth
19:00 GMT		Report		Stadium: The New Lawn; Attendance: 750; Referee: David Rock
	Penalties
	Bunker (penalty scored); Omotoye (penalty scored); Robson (penalty missed); Welch (penalty missed)		(penalty scored) O'Mahony; (penalty scored) Hinchy; (penalty scored) Chouchane; (penalty scored) Mullins

14 November 2023	Shrewsbury Town	3–2	Walsall	Shrewsbury
19:00 GMT	Udoh 32'; Benning 34'; Bowman 49'	Report	Johnson 6'; Hutchinson 73'	Stadium: New Meadow; Attendance: 1,409; Referee: Ruebyn Ricardo

==== Group B ====
Pos	Div	Team	Pld	W	PW	PL	L	GF	GA	GD	Pts	Qualification
1	L2	Crawley Town	3	2	0	1	0	7	5	+2	7	Advance to Round 2
2	L1	Charlton Athletic	3	2	0	0	1	10	6	+4	6	Advance to Round 2
3	L2	Sutton United	3	0	1	1	1	2	5	−3	3	
4	ACA	Aston Villa U21	3	0	1	0	2	6	9	−3	2	

Updated to match(es) played on 21 November 2023. Source: EFL.com

5 September 2023	Crawley Town	4–3	Charlton Athletic	Crawley
19:45 BST (UTC+1)	Forster 1'; Lolos 45+4'; Tsaroulla 70'; Khaleel 81'	Report	Leaburn 23'; Campbell 26'; Dobson 58'	Stadium: Broadfield Stadium; Attendance: 1,973; Referee: Aji Ajibola

19 September 2023	Sutton United	2–2 (4–5 p)	Aston Villa U21	Sutton
19:45 BST (UTC+1)	Kasimu 79'; Beautyman 90+10'	Report	O'Reilly 6' (pen.); Kellyman 68'	Stadium: Gander Green Lane; Attendance: 859; Referee: Jacob Miles
	Penalties
	Beautyman (penalty scored); O'Brien (penalty scored); Milsom (penalty missed); N'Guessan (penalty scored); Patrick (penalty scored)		(penalty scored) Munroe; (penalty scored) Rowe; (penalty scored) Patterson; (penalty scored) Moore; (penalty scored) Broggio

10 October 2023	Charlton Athletic	4–2	Aston Villa U21	Charlton
19:00 BST (UTC+1)	Kirk 4'; Leaburn 29' (pen.), 45+2'; Watson 40'	Report	Moore 73'; Alcock 81'	Stadium: The Valley; Attendance: 1,273; Referee: Neil Hair

10 October 2023	Sutton United	0–0 (5–4 p)	Crawley Town	Sutton
19:45 BST (UTC+1)		Report		Stadium: Gander Green Lane; Attendance: 928; Referee: Kirsty Dowie
	Penalties
	N'Guessan (penalty scored); Angol (penalty scored); Beautyman (penalty scored); Fadahunsi (penalty scored); Coley (penalty scored)		(penalty scored) Adeyemo; (penalty scored) Roles; (penalty scored) Henry; (penalty scored) Wright; (penalty missed) Forster

7 November 2023	Crawley Town	3–2	Aston Villa U21	Crawley
19:45 GMT	Roles 7', 55'; Simon-Swyer 15'	Report	Moore 42'; Richards 50'	Stadium: Broadfield Stadium; Attendance: 865; Referee: Sunny Gill

21 November 2023	Charlton Athletic	3–0	Sutton United	Charlton
19:00 GMT	Blackett-Taylor 11'; McGrandles 50'; May 68'	Report		Stadium: The Valley; Attendance: 1,377; Referee: Carl Brook

==== Group C ====
Pos	Div	Team	Pld	W	PW	PL	L	GF	GA	GD	Pts	Qualification
1	L1	Wycombe Wanderers	3	3	0	0	0	3	0	+3	9	Advance to Round 2
2	L2	AFC Wimbledon	3	1	1	0	1	3	2	+1	5	Advance to Round 2
3	L1	Stevenage	3	1	0	1	1	6	4	+2	4	
4	ACA	Crystal Palace U21	3	0	0	0	3	2	8	−6	0	

Updated to match(es) played on 14 November 2023. Source: EFL.com

5 September 2023	AFC Wimbledon	1–1 (6–5 p)	Stevenage	Wimbledon
19:00 BST (UTC+1)	Lewis 71'	Report	Reid 55' (pen.)	Stadium: Plough Lane; Attendance: 1,317; Referee: Stephen Parkinson
	Penalties
	Sasu (penalty scored); Ball (penalty scored); Brown (penalty scored); Ogundere (penalty scored); Tilley (penalty scored); Lakin (penalty scored)		(penalty scored) Reid; (penalty scored) Hemmings; (penalty scored) MacDonald; (penalty scored) Forster-Caskey; (penalty scored) Thompson; (penalty missed) Freeman

19 September 2023	Wycombe Wanderers	1–0	Crystal Palace U21	High Wycombe
19:00 BST (UTC+1)	Leahy 90+2' (pen.)	Report		Stadium: Adams Park; Attendance: 442; Referee: Sam Purkiss

10 October 2023	Stevenage	0–1	Wycombe Wanderers	Stevenage
19:00 BST (UTC+1)		Report	Vokes 70'	Stadium: Broadhall Way; Attendance: 902; Referee: Daniel Middleton

7 November 2023	AFC Wimbledon	2–0	Crystal Palace U21	Wimbledon
19:00 GMT	Davison 3', 16'	Report		Stadium: Plough Lane; Attendance: 895; Referee: Christopher Pollard

14 November 2023	Stevenage	5–2	Crystal Palace U21	Stevenage
19:00 GMT	Sheridan 5' (o.g.); Forster-Caskey 13'; White 22'; Pressley 54', 83'	Report	Ebiowei 17'; Ola-Adebomi 20'	Stadium: Broadhall Way; Attendance: 607; Referee: Daniel Middleton

18 November 2023	Wycombe Wanderers	1–0	AFC Wimbledon	High Wycombe
12:30 GMT	Sadlier 84'	Report		Stadium: Adams Park; Attendance: 664
Note: Was originally playing on 21 November 2023 but was moved forward due to both Clubs having league games postponed due to international break

==== Group D ====
Pos	Div	Team	Pld	W	PW	PL	L	GF	GA	GD	Pts	Qualification
1	L1	Peterborough United	3	2	0	0	1	5	2	+3	6	Advance to Round 2
2	L2	Colchester United	3	2	0	0	1	3	6	−3	6	Advance to Round 2
3	ACA	Tottenham Hotspur U21	3	1	0	0	2	7	7	0	3	
4	L1	Cambridge United	3	1	0	0	2	5	5	0	3	

Updated to match(es) played on 7 November 2023. Source: EFL.com

12 September 2023	Peterborough United	2–0	Cambridge United	Peterborough
19:00 BST (UTC+1)	Katongo 19'; Mason-Clark 54'	Report		Stadium: London Road; Attendance: 3,687; Referee: Kirsty Dowle

19 September 2023	Colchester United	0–5	Tottenham Hotspur U21	Colchester
19:30 BST (UTC+1)		Report	Donley 33', 56'; Soonsup-Bell 53', 73'; Lankester 60'	Stadium: Colchester Community Stadium; Attendance: 1,895; Referee: Sunny Singh Gill

17 October 2023	Cambridge United	1–2	Colchester United	Cambridge
19:00 BST (UTC+1)	Ahadme 90+5' (pen.)	Report	Tovide 17'; Cooper 43'	Stadium: Abbey Stadium; Attendance: 991; Referee: Jamie O'Connor

31 October 2023	Peterborough United	3–1	Tottenham Hotspur U21	Peterborough
19:00 GMT	Fernandez 31'; Jones 53'; Poku 69'	Report	Véliz 24'	Stadium: London Road; Attendance: 2,094; Referee: Carl Brook

7 November 2023	Cambridge United	4–1	Tottenham Hotspur U21	Cambridge
19:00 GMT	Yearn 41'; Janneh 53'; Lankester 88'; Simper 90+2'	Report	Lankshear 73'	Stadium: Abbey Stadium; Attendance: 1,311; Referee: Jacob Miles

21 November 2023	Colchester United	1–0	Peterborough United	Colchester
19:30 GMT	Ihionvien 42'	Report		Stadium: Colchester Community Stadium; Attendance: 802

==== Group E ====
Pos	Div	Team	Pld	W	PW	PL	L	GF	GA	GD	Pts	Qualification
1	L1	Portsmouth	3	2	1	0	0	10	5	+5	8	Advance to Round 2
2	ACA	Fulham U21	3	1	0	2	0	6	5	+1	5	Advance to Round 2
3	L2	Gillingham	3	1	0	0	2	3	7	−4	3	
4	L1	Leyton Orient	3	0	1	0	2	4	6	−2	2	

Updated to match(es) played on 7 November 2023. Source: EFL.com

22 August 2023	Portsmouth	3–3 (5–4 p)	Fulham U21	Portsmouth
19:00 BST (UTC+1)	Raggett 17', 51'; Devlin 28'	Report	Donnell 1'; Godo 39'; McCoy-Splatt 73'	Stadium: Fratton Park; Attendance: 3,596; Referee: Carl Brook
	Penalties
	Raggett (penalty scored); Robertson (penalty scored); Scully (penalty scored); Swanson (penalty missed); Kamara (penalty scored); Sparkes (penalty scored)		(penalty scored) Dibley-Dias; (penalty scored) McFarlane; (penalty scored) Donnell; (penalty missed) Araujo; (penalty scored) Šekularac; (penalty missed) Tanton

5 September 2023	Gillingham	2–1	Leyton Orient	Gillingham
19:00 BST (UTC+1)	Alexander 80' (pen.); Beckles 83' (o.g.)	Report 1 Report 2	Morris 43' (o.g.)	Stadium: Priestfield Stadium; Attendance: 1,388; Referee: Ben Atkinson

19 September 2023	Leyton Orient	2–2 (5–4 p)	Fulham U21	Leyton
19:00 BST (UTC+1)	Galbraith 9'; El Mizouni 90+6'	Report	Šekularac 45+2'; O'Neill 60'	Stadium: Brisbane Road; Attendance: 780; Referee: Darren Drysdale
	Penalties
	Moncur (penalty scored); Graham (penalty scored); Pigott (penalty scored); Galbraith (penalty scored); El Mizouni (penalty scored)		(penalty scored) Dibley-Dias; (penalty scored) O'Neill; (penalty scored) Pajaziti; (penalty missed) Lanquedoc; (penalty scored) Šekularac

10 October 2023	Portsmouth	5–1	Gillingham	Portsmouth
19:45 BST (UTC+1)	Anjorin 11'; Stevenson 50'; Yengi 54'; Kamara 72'; Towler 80'	Report	Williams 45'	Stadium: Fratton Park; Attendance: 5,066; Referee: Farai Hallam

7 November 2023	Gillingham	0–1	Fulham U21	Gillingham
19:00 GMT		Report	Loupalo-Bi 43'	Stadium: Priestfield Stadium; Attendance: 1,226; Referee: Craig Hicks

7 November 2023	Leyton Orient	1–2	Portsmouth	Leyton
19:00 GMT	Pigott 58'	Report	Saydee 44'; Kamara 74'	Stadium: Brisbane Road; Attendance: 2,371; Referee: Stephen Parkinson

==== Group F ====
Pos	Div	Team	Pld	W	PW	PL	L	GF	GA	GD	Pts	Qualification
1	L2	Milton Keynes Dons	3	3	0	0	0	8	3	+5	9	Advance to Round 2
2	L1	Oxford United	3	2	0	0	1	8	2	+6	6	Advance to Round 2
3	ACA	Chelsea U21	3	0	1	0	2	3	11	−8	2	
4	L1	Northampton Town	3	0	0	1	2	5	8	−3	1	

Updated to match(es) played on 7 November 2023. Source: EFL.com

29 August 2023	Milton Keynes Dons	4–1	Chelsea U21	Milton Keynes
19:00 BST (UTC+1)	Dennis 9'; Leko 56'; Dean 70', 79'	Report 1 Report 2	Morgan 21'	Stadium: Stadium MK; Attendance: 1,704; Referee: J Miles

5 September 2023	Northampton Town	1–3	Oxford United	Northampton
19:00 BST (UTC+1)	Simpson 4' (pen.)	Report	Harris 15' (pen.), 61'; Edwards 48'	Stadium: Sixfields Stadium; Attendance: 1,608; Referee: Garreth Rhodes

19 September 2023	Oxford United	0–1	Milton Keynes Dons	Oxford
19:00 BST (UTC+1)		Report	Payne 56' (pen.)	Stadium: Kassam Stadium; Attendance: 1,588; Referee: Alan Young

26 September 2023	Northampton Town	2–2 (3–4 p)	Chelsea U21	Northampton
19:00 BST (UTC+1)	McWilliams 22'; Simpson 24'	Report	Stutter 11'; Golding 36'	Stadium: Sixfields Stadium; Attendance: 2,004; Referee: David Rock
	Penalties
	Lintott (penalty missed); Wyatt (penalty scored); Abimbola (penalty scored); Dobson (penalty scored); Monthé (penalty missed)		(penalty scored) Williams; (penalty scored) Castledine; (penalty scored) Rak-Sayki; (penalty scored) George

7 November 2023	Oxford United	5–0	Chelsea U21	Oxford
19:00 GMT	Perkins 15'; Thorniley 18'; Murphy 71', 78'; Harris 90+1'	Report		Stadium: Kassam Stadium; Attendance: 1,298; Referee: James Durkin

21 November 2023	Milton Keynes Dons	3–2	Northampton Town	Milton Keynes
19:00 GMT	Waller 56'; Burns 64'; Devoy 83'	Report	Monthe 36'; Simpson 82' (pen.)	Stadium: Stadium MK; Attendance: 1,648

==== Group G ====
Pos	Div	Team	Pld	W	PW	PL	L	GF	GA	GD	Pts	Qualification
1	L1	Reading	3	3	0	0	0	19	2	+17	9	Advance to Round 2
2	ACA	Arsenal U21	3	1	1	0	1	9	7	+2	5	Advance to Round 2
3	L1	Exeter City	3	1	0	0	2	1	14	−13	3	
4	L2	Swindon Town	3	0	0	1	2	2	8	−6	1	

Updated to match(es) played on 14 November 2023. Source: EFL.com

22 August 2023	Swindon Town	2–2 (4–5 p)	Arsenal U21	Swindon
19:00 BST (UTC+1)	Walters 6' (o.g.); Uwakwe 34'	Report	Sousa 11'; Gower 82'	Stadium: County Ground; Attendance: 3,352; Referee: Lee Swabey
	Penalties
	Cain (penalty scored); Wakeling (penalty scored); Shade (penalty scored); Ward (penalty missed); Genesini (penalty scored)		(penalty scored) Flores; (penalty scored) Cozier–Duberry; (penalty scored) Edwards; (penalty scored) Nwaneri; (penalty scored) Sweet

19 September 2023	Exeter City	0–9	Reading	Exeter
19:00 BST (UTC+1)			McIntyre 3'; Jules 32' (o.g.); Mukairu 56', 60'; Ballard 67', 90+6'; Elliott 79'; Harris 85'; Vickers 90'	Stadium: St James Park; Attendance: 1,871; Referee: Carl Brook

10 October 2023	Reading	5–0	Swindon Town	Reading
19:00 BST (UTC+1)	Knibbs 19', 45+2', 49' (pen.); Mukairu 90+4'; Dean 90+6'	Report		Stadium: Madejski Stadium; Attendance: 6,121; Referee: Aji Ajibola

10 October 2023	Exeter City	0–5	Arsenal U21	Exeter
19:15 BST (UTC+1)		Report	Sagoe Jr. 61'; Ferdinand 79', 90+7'; Edwards 82'; Henry-Francis 90'	Stadium: St James Park; Attendance: 3,311; Referee: Edward Duckworth

14 November 2023	Reading	5–2	Arsenal U21	Reading
19:00 GMT	Ehibhatiomhan 13', 35'; Vickers 24'; Knibbs 68'; Smith 90+5'	Report	Vieira 33' (pen.); Edwards 53'	Stadium: Madejski Stadium; Attendance: 3,015; Referee: Alan Young

21 November 2023	Swindon Town	0–1	Exeter City	Swindon
19:00 GMT		Report	Minturn 6' (o.g.)	Stadium: County Ground; Attendance: 644

==== Group H ====
Pos	Div	Team	Pld	W	PW	PL	L	GF	GA	GD	Pts	Qualification
1	ACA	West Ham United U21	3	3	0	0	0	8	1	+7	9	Advance to Round 2
2	L1	Bristol Rovers	3	2	0	0	1	6	4	+2	6	Advance to Round 2
3	L2	Newport County	3	1	0	0	2	2	2	0	3	
4	L1	Cheltenham Town	3	0	0	0	3	1	10	−9	0	

Updated to match(es) played on 14 November 2023. Source: EFL.com

5 September 2023	Bristol Rovers	4–1	Cheltenham Town	Bristol
19:45 BST (UTC+1)	Gibbons 9'; Evans 27'; Collins 40'; Street 68' (o.g.)	Report	Gibbons 50' (o.g.)	Stadium: Memorial Stadium; Attendance: 1,184; Referee: Daniel Middleton

19 September 2023	Bristol Rovers	1–3	West Ham United U21	Bristol
19:45 BST (UTC+1)	Finley 24'	Report	Marshall 70' (pen.), 90+3'; Earthy 78'	Stadium: Memorial Stadium; Attendance: 978; Referee: Scott Tallis

10 October 2023	Cheltenham Town	0–2	Newport County	Cheltenham
19:30 BST (UTC+1)		Report	Wood 26'; Evans 53'	Stadium: Whaddon Road; Attendance: 1,175; Referee: Matthew Russell

31 October 2023	Newport County	0–1	West Ham United U21	Newport
19:30 GMT		Report	Kodua 62'	Stadium: Rodney Parade; Attendance: 800; Referee: Craig Hicks

7 November 2023	Cheltenham Town	0–4	West Ham United U21	Cheltenham
19:30 GMT		Report	Scarles 23'; Mubama 24'; Earthy 35'; Marshall 80'	Stadium: Whaddon Road; Attendance: 1,090; Referee: Tom Reeves

14 November 2023	Newport County	0–1	Bristol Rovers	Newport
19:45 GMT		Report	Evans 37'	Stadium: Rodney Parade; Attendance: 1,346; Referee: Farai Hallam

== Round of 32 ==
The draw for the Round of 32 was made on Friday 24 November 2023, with ties scheduled to take place on the week commencing 4 December.

=== Northern section ===
5 December 2023	Blackpool	2–1	Barnsley	Blackpool
19:00 GMT	Dale 50'; Beesley 62'	Report	McAtee 41'	Stadium: Bloomfield Road; Attendance: 1,296; Referee: Daniel Middleton

5 December 2023	Derby County	3–0	Fleetwood Town	Derby
19:00 GMT	Collins 25', 77'; John-Jules 88'	Report		Stadium: Pride Park Stadium; Attendance: 1,981; Referee: Lewis Smith

5 December 2023	Doncaster Rovers	3–0	Nottingham Forest U21	Doncaster
19:00 GMT	Molyneux 43'; Hurst 74'; Ironside 85'	Report		Stadium: Eco-Power Stadium; Attendance: 1,252; Referee: Simon Mather

5 December 2023	Bradford City	4–0	Liverpool U21	Bradford
19:30 GMT	Smith 7', 90+5'; Cook 49'; Oliver 64'	Report		Stadium: Valley Parade; Attendance: 1,907; Referee: Adam Herczeg

5 December 2023	Wrexham	2–3	Burton Albion	Wrexham
19:30 GMT	Dalby 5'; Davies 90+2'	Report	Oshilaja 1'; Helm 3'; Sweeney 64'	Stadium: STōK Cae Ras; Attendance: 4,963; Referee: Scott Tallis

5 December 2023	Bolton Wanderers	2–0	Port Vale	Horwich
19:45 GMT	Charles 9'; Gomes 64'	Report		Stadium: Toughsheet Community Stadium; Attendance: 2,103; Referee: Matthew Corlett

6 December 2023	Wigan Athletic	2–0	Stockport County	Wigan
19:00 GMT	Smith 17'; Morrison 23'	Report		Stadium: DW Stadium; Attendance: 3,051; Referee: Sunny Sukhvir Gill

12 December 2023	Accrington Stanley	1–0	Lincoln City	Accrington
19:00 GMT	Longelo 90+3'	Report		Stadium: Crown Ground; Attendance: 1,159
Note: original Match on 5 December was postponed due to a frozen pitch.

=== Southern section ===
5 December 2023	Wycombe Wanderers	3–2	Fulham U21	High Wycombe
19:00 GMT	D. Taylor 22', 37'; Forino-Joseph 79'	Report	O'Neill 45+3'; Esenga 82'	Stadium: Adams Park; Attendance: 323; Referee: Kirsty Dowle

5 December 2023	MK Dons	0–4	Brighton & Hove Albion U21	Milton Keynes
19:00 GMT		Report	Chouchane 50'; Knight 67'; McConville 88'; Bashir 90+1'	Stadium: Stadium MK; Attendance: 789; Referee: Neil Hair

5 December 2023	Forest Green Rovers	0–1	Oxford United	Nailsworth
19:00 GMT		Report	Goodrham 49'	Stadium: The New Lawn; Attendance: 494; Referee: Ollie Yates

5 December 2023	Peterborough United	3–0	Arsenal U21	Peterborough
19:30 GMT	de Havilland 36'; Clarke-Harris 39'; Mothersille 49'	Report		Stadium: London Road Stadium; Attendance: 2,151; Referee: Lee Swabey

5 December 2023	Colchester United	0–4	West Ham United U21	Colchester
19:30 GMT		Report	Chesters 8'; Earthy 57'; Orford 73'; Mubama 82'	Stadium: Colchester Community Stadium; Attendance: 1,149; Referee: Jacob Miles

5 December 2023	Crawley Town	2–1	Bristol Rovers	Crawley
19:45 GMT	Roles 56'; Forster 69'	Report	Thomas 45'	Stadium: Broadfield Stadium; Attendance: 896; Referee: Alan Young

6 December 2023	Reading	1–1 (4–2 p)	Charlton Athletic	Reading
19:00 GMT	Savage 82'	Report	May 42'	Stadium: Select Car Leasing Stadium; Attendance: 1,809; Referee: Peter Wright
	Penalties
	Knibbs (penalty scored); Carson (penalty scored); Azeez (penalty scored); Vickers (penalty scored)		(penalty missed) May; (penalty scored) Fraser; (penalty scored) Hector; (penalty missed) Watson

19 December 2023	Portsmouth	2–5	AFC Wimbledon	Portsmouth
19:45 GMT	Yengi 43'; Whyte 58'	Report	Sasu 11'; Davison 22'; Pearce 28'; Pell 48'; Al-Hamadi 89'	Stadium: Fratton Park; Attendance: 7,922; Referee: Craig Hicks

== Round of 16 ==
The draw was made on Friday 8 December 2023, with ties scheduled to take place on the week commencing 8 January 2024.

=== Northern section ===
9 January 2024	Derby County	0–1	Bradford City	Derby
19:00 GMT		Report	Stubbs 67'	Stadium: Pride Park Stadium; Attendance: 3,831; Referee: Carl Brook

10 January 2024	Blackpool	2–1	Burton Albion	Blackpool
19:00 GMT	Virtue 4'; Ekpiteta 67'	Report	Scott 71'	Stadium: Bloomfield Road; Attendance: 1,534

10 January 2024	Accrington Stanley	1–3	Bolton Wanderers	Accrington
19:45 GMT	Henderson 37'	Report	Jerome 15'; Morley 29' (pen.); Dempsey 83'	Stadium: Wham Stadium; Attendance: 3,441

16 January 2024	Doncaster Rovers	1–1 (4–2 p)	Wigan Athletic	Doncaster
19:00 GMT	Bailey 70'	Report	Wyke 11'	Stadium: Eco-Power Stadium; Attendance: 1,530; Referee: Ollie Yates
	Penalties
	Ironside (penalty scored); Close (penalty scored); Bailey (penalty scored); Hurst (penalty scored)		Magennis (penalty scored); Humphrys (penalty scored); Hughes (penalty missed); Jones (penalty missed)

=== Southern section ===
9 January 2024	Brighton & Hove Albion U21	0–0 (3–2 p)	Reading	Falmer
19:00 GMT		Report		Stadium: Falmer Stadium; Attendance: 990; Referee: Will Finnie
	Penalties
	O'Mahony (penalty scored); Hinchy (penalty scored); Slater (penalty missed); Knight (penalty missed); Howell (penalty scored)		(penalty missed) Vickers; (penalty scored) Bindon; (penalty missed) Azeez; (penalty missed) Rushesha; (penalty scored) Wareham

9 January 2024	Wycombe Wanderers	2–1	West Ham United U21	High Wycombe
19:00 GMT	Orford 5' (o.g.); Kone 32'	Report	Kodua 58'	Stadium: Adams Park; Attendance: 881; Referee: Alex Chilowicz

9 January 2024	AFC Wimbledon	2–0	Oxford United	Wimbledon
19:45 GMT	Tilley 21', 50'	Report		Stadium: Plough Lane; Attendance: 1,316; Referee: Declan Bourne

23 January 2024	Peterborough United	2–1	Crawley Town	Peterborough
19:00 GMT	Burrows 28'; Mason-Clark 37'	Report	Tsaroulla 23'	Stadium: London Road Stadium; Attendance: 2,933; Referee: Simon Mather
Note: Match originally scheduled for 10 January, postponed due to a Frozen Pitch

== Quarter-finals ==
The draw was made on Friday 12 January 2024 with ties scheduled to take place on the week commencing 29 January 2024.

=== Northern section ===
30 January 2024	Blackpool	0–0 (5–4 p)	Bolton Wanderers	Blackpool
19:00 GMT		Report		Stadium: Bloomfield Road; Attendance: 5,649; Referee: Seb Stockbridge
	Penalties
	Hamilton (penalty scored); Connolly (penalty scored); Norburn (penalty missed); Lawrence-Gabriel (penalty missed); Dembélé (penalty scored); Kouassi (penalty scored); Pennington (penalty scored)		(penalty scored) Morley; (penalty missed) Charles; (penalty missed) Böðvarsson; (penalty scored) Mendes Gomes; (penalty scored) Thomason; (penalty scored) Dacres-Cogley; (penalty missed) Ashworth

30 January 2024	Bradford City	1–0	Doncaster Rovers	Bradford
19:30 GMT	Chapman 58'	Report		Stadium: Valley Parade; Attendance: 3,086; Referee: Will Finnie

=== Southern section ===
30 January 2024	Peterborough United	3–1	AFC Wimbledon	Peterborough
19:00 GMT	Mothersille 2'; Mason-Clark 4'; Jones 90+5'	Report	McLean 89'	Stadium: Weston Homes Stadium; Attendance: 3,225; Referee: Carl Brook

31 January 2024	Wycombe Wanderers	4–1	Brighton & Hove Albion U21	High Wycombe
19:00 GMT	Sadlier 40', 45+1'; Kavanagh 44' (o.g.); Taylor 47'	Report	Barrington 65'	Stadium: Adams Park; Attendance: 769; Referee: Paul Howard
Note: Brighton were Drawn as the Home side but were granted Special Dispensation by the EFL to play Away from Home. They were also given Dispensation by the EFL to play the Game on Wednesday 31 January due to their first Team playing on Tuesday 30 January

== Semi-finals ==
The draw was made on Friday 2 February 2024 with ties scheduled taking place in the week commencing 19 February 2024. The draw was not regionalised. Both semi-final games were broadcast on Sky Sports.

20 February 2024	Blackpool	0–3	Peterborough United	Blackpool
20:00 GMT		Report	Mothersille 37'; Burrows 79' (pen.), 90+3'	Stadium: Bloomfield Road; Attendance: 6,044; Referee: Lewis Smith

21 February 2024	Bradford City	0–1	Wycombe Wanderers	Bradford
20:00 GMT		Report	Butcher 90+1'	Stadium: Valley Parade; Attendance: 6,903; Referee: Tom Reeves

== Final ==
7 April 2024
16:30 BST

Peterborough United	2–1	Wycombe Wanderers
Burrows 85', 90+1'	Report	Taylor 89'

Wembley Stadium, London
Attendance: 42,252
Referee: Scott Oldham
