= 2023–24 Northampton Town F.C. season =

126th season in existence of Northampton Town FC

Northampton Town
2023–24 season
- Chairman: Kelvin Thomas
- Manager: Jon Brady
- Stadium: Sixfields Stadium
- League One: 14th
- FA Cup: First round
- EFL Cup: First round
- EFL Trophy: Group stage
- Top goalscorer: League: Sam Hoskins (15); All: Sam Hoskins (15)
- Highest home attendance: 7,710 vs Charlton Athletic
- Lowest home attendance: 1,608 vs Oxford United
- Average home league attendance: 6,841
Home colours	Away colours

The 2023–24 season was Northampton Town's 127th season in their history and the first season back in League One, after promotion the previous season. Alongside competing in League One, the club also participated in the FA Cup, EFL Cup and EFL Trophy. The season covered the period from 1 July 2023 to 30 June 2024.

== Players ==
As of 27 April 2024

No.	Name	Position	Nat.	Place of Birth	Date of Birth (Age)	Apps	Goals	Previous club	Date signed	Fee
Goalkeepers
1	Lee Burge	GK	(England)	Hereford	9 January 1993 (aged 31)	59	0	Sunderland	22 June 2022	Free
31	Louie Moulden	GK	(England)	Bolton	6 January 2002 (aged 22)	12	0	Wolverhampton Wanderers	16 January 2024	Loan
36	James Dadge	GK	(England)	Northampton	18 October 2004 (aged 19)	0	0	Academy	1 July 2023	N/A
Defenders
2	Tyler Magloire	CB	(England)	Bradford	21 December 1998 (aged 25)	29	2	Blackburn Rovers	28 July 2022	Undisclosed
3	Aaron McGowan (vc)	RB	(England)	Liverpool	24 July 1996 (aged 27)	95	2	Kilmarnock	12 July 2021	Undisclosed
5	Jon Guthrie (c)	CB	(England)	Devizes	29 July 1992 (aged 31)	130	14	Livingston	24 June 2021	Free
6	Sam Sherring	CB	(England)	Dorchester	8 May 2000 (aged 23)	77	2	AFC Bournemouth	5 July 2022	Compensation
12	Manny Monthé	CB	(Cameroon)	Douala	26 January 1995 (aged 29)	36	2	Walsall	14 July 2023	Free
14	Ali Koiki	LB	(England)	Kensington	22 August 1999 (aged 24)	88	2	Bristol Rovers	23 July 2021	Free
15	Jordan Willis	CB	(England)	Coventry	24 August 1994 (aged 29)	28	0	Wycombe Wanderers	7 October 2023	Free
20	Harvey Lintott	RB	(England)	Gillingham	20 February 2003 (aged 21)	58	1	Gillingham	11 July 2022	Free
22	Akin Odimayo	FB	(England)	Camden	28 November 1999 (aged 24)	54	0	Swindon Town	2 July 2022	Compensation
24	Ryan Haynes	LB	(England)	Northampton	27 September 1995 (aged 28)	38	1	Newport County	20 June 2022	Free
25	Josh Tomlinson	CB	(England)	Kettering	1 December 2005 (aged 18)	5	1	Academy	7 December 2022	N/A
26	Liam Moore	CB	(England)	Loughborough	31 January 1993 (aged 31)	8	0	Reading	13 February 2023	Free
33	Patrick Brough	LB	(England)	Carlisle	20 February 1996 (aged 28)	40	2	Barrow	15 June 2023	Free
35	Max Dyche	CB	(England)	Northampton	22 February 2003 (aged 21)	33	1	Academy	12 December 2020	N/A
Midfielders
4	Jack Sowerby	CM	(England)	Preston	23 March 1995 (aged 29)	141	2	Fleetwood Town	18 September 2020	Undisclosed
8	Ben Fox	CM	(England)	Burton upon Trent	1 February 1998 (aged 26)	47	4	Grimsby Town	17 June 2022	Free
11	Mitch Pinnock	W	(England)	Gravesend	12 December 1994 (aged 29)	149	23	Kilmarnock	8 June 2021	Free
17	Shaun McWilliams	CM	(England)	Northampton	14 August 1998 (aged 25)	229	7	Academy	30 April 2016	N/A
21	Marc Leonard	CM	(Scotland)	Glasgow	19 December 2001 (aged 22)	97	6	Brighton & Hove Albion	29 July 2023	Loan
23	Will Hondermarck	CM	(Republic of the Congo)	Orléans (FRA)	21 November 2000 (aged 23)	49	2	Barnsley	26 January 2023	Undisclosed
27	Peter Abimbola	CM	(England)	Northampton	22 February 2004 (aged 20)	11	0	Academy	30 August 2021	N/A
28	Tony Springett	W	(Republic of Ireland)	London (ENG)	22 September 2002 (aged 21)	13	1	Norwich City	15 January 2024	Loan
29	Dominic Gape	DM	(England)	Burton Bradstock	9 September 1994 (aged 29)	2	0	Sutton United	3 February 2024	Free
Forwards
7	Sam Hoskins	FW	(England)	Dorchester	4 February 1993 (aged 31)	378	90	Yeovil Town	1 August 2015	Free
9	Louis Appéré	CF	(Scotland)	Perth	26 March 1999 (aged 25)	106	18	Dundee United	31 January 2022	Undisclosed
10	Danny Hylton	CF	(England)	Camden	25 February 1989 (aged 35)	32	0	Luton Town	21 June 2022	Free
16	Tyreece Simpson	CF	(England)	Ipswich	7 February 2002 (aged 22)	44	6	Huddersfield Town	26 July 2023	Loan
19	Kieron Bowie	FW	(Scotland)	Kirkcaldy	21 September 2002 (aged 21)	85	14	Fulham	3 July 2023	Loan

== Pre-season and friendlies ==
On 26 May, Northampton Town confirmed the squad would return to University of St Andrews in Scotland for a pre-season training camp. Six days later, the first friendly was confirmed, against Birmingham City. A second friendly was confirmed against Milton Keynes Dons. A third friendly was announced, as part of the clubs annual open day, against Leicester City. On 16 June, the Cobblers revealed a fourth friendly, against Brackley Town. A week later, a fifth fixture was added, against Kidderminster Harriers.

15 July 2023 Friendly	Northampton Town	0–1	Leicester City	Northampton
15:00 BST		Report	K.Dewsbury-Hall 27'	Stadium: Sixfields Stadium; Attendance: 7,765 (3,738); Referee: Dean Whitestone

19 July 2023 Friendly	Northampton Town	0–1	Birmingham City	Northampton
19:45 BST		Report	J.James 30'	Stadium: Sixfields Stadium; Attendance: 2,540 (984); Referee: Josh Smith

22 July 2023 Friendly	Brackley Town	1–2	Northampton Town	Brackley
14:00 BST	G.Dean 52'	Report	H.Lindley (trialist) 44'; K.Leshabela (trialist) 62'	Stadium: St James Park; Attendance: 813; Referee: Carl Henry

25 July 2023 Friendly	Kidderminster Harriers	2–2	Northampton Town	Kidderminster
19:00 BST	K.Pearce 65'; A.Hemmings 77'	Report	S.Hoskins 5'; M.Pinnock 20'	Stadium: Aggborough Stadium; Attendance: 840 (82)

29 July 2023 Friendly	Milton Keynes Dons	1–3	Northampton Town	Bletchley
15:00 BST	W.O'Hora 59'	Report	M.Pinnock 8'; P.Abimbola 87'; B.Fox 88'	Stadium: Stadium MK; Attendance: 3,087 (1,073); Referee: Alan Young

== Competitions ==
=== Overall record ===
Competition	Starting round	Final position	Record							
Competition	Starting round	Final position	Pld	W	D	L	GF	GA	GD	Win %
League One	Matchday 1		46	17	9	20	57	66	−9	36.96
FA Cup	First round	First round	1	0	0	1	1	3	−2	0.00
EFL Cup	First round	First round	1	0	0	1	0	3	−3	0.00
EFL Trophy	Group stage	Group stage	3	0	1	2	5	8	−3	0.00
Total			51	17	10	24	63	80	−17	33.33

Last updated: 27 April 2024
Source: Soccerway

=== EFL League One ===
==== League table ====
Pos	Team	Pld	W	D	L	GF	GA	GD	Pts
11	Leyton Orient	46	18	11	17	53	55	−2	65
12	Wigan Athletic	46	20	10	16	63	56	+7	62 (Note: On 19 May 2023, Wigan Athletic were deducted four points for failing to pay players and staff on time following previous EFL rules breaches in the 2022–23 season. Another four-point deduction was applied on 26 May, after the club's owners missed a deadline to deposit an amount equalling 125% of its monthly wage bill.)
13	Exeter City	46	17	10	19	46	61	−15	61
14	Northampton Town	46	17	9	20	57	66	−9	60
15	Bristol Rovers	46	16	9	21	52	68	−16	57
16	Charlton Athletic	46	11	20	15	64	65	−1	53
17	Reading	46	16	11	19	68	70	−2	53 (Note: On 16 August 2023, Reading were deducted one point for failing to pay players on time and in full on three occasions in the 2022–23 season. Another 3-point deduction was applied on 13 September, for failing to deposit wages on time. Another 2-point deduction was applied on 27 February, due to late HMRC payments.)

Source: EFL Official Website
Rules for classification: 1) Points; 2) Goal difference; 3) Number of goals scored; 4) Head-to-head results; 5) Wins; 6) Away goals; 7) Penalty points (sec 9.5); 8) 12-point sending off offences

==== Results summary ====
Overall								Home						Away					
Pld	W	D	L	GF	GA	GD	Pts	W	D	L	GF	GA	GD	W	D	L	GF	GA	GD
46	17	9	20	57	66	−9	60	11	5	7	31	23	+8	6	4	13	26	43	−17

Last updated: 27 April 2024.
Source: Soccerway

==== League position by match ====
Round	1	2	3	4	5	6	8	9	10	11	12	14	15	16	7^{1}	17	19	20	13^{2}	21	22	23	24	25	26	28	18^{3}	30	31	32	33	34	29^{5}	35	36	27^{4}	37	38	39	40	41	42	43	44	45	46
Ground	H	A	H	H	A	H	A	H	A	H	A	A	H	A	A	H	H	A	H	H	A	H	A	A	H	H	A	H	A	H	A	H	A	A	H	A	A	H	A	H	A	H	H	A	H	A
Result	L	L	D	W	W	L	L	L	W	W	L	L	D	L	L	W	W	W	L	W	D	W	L	W	W	D	W	L	L	D	L	W	D	W	D	L	D	L	L	W	L	W	W	L	L	D
Position	17	18	19	16	13	15	19	18	17	16	17	19	19	20	20	19	15	13	13	12	12	10	11	10	9	9	9	9	11	11	12	11	11	11	12	12	11	12	14	11	11	11	11	11	14	14

Updated to match(es) played on 27 April 2024. Source:
A = Away; H = Home; W = Win; D = Draw; L = Loss
Notes:
- ^{1} Matchday 7 (vs Derby County) was postponed due to the international call-ups.
- ^{2} Matchday 13 (vs Portsmouth) was postponed due to the international call-ups.
- ^{3} Matchday 18 (vs Charlton Athletic) was postponed due to the international call-ups.
- ^{4} Matchday 27 (vs Peterborough United) was postponed due Peterborough's FA Cup involvement.
- ^{5} Matchday 29 (vs Oxford United) postponed because of a frozen pitch.

==== Matches ====
Win Draw Loss

The 2023/24 league fixtures were announced on 22 June.

5 August 2023 1	Northampton Town	0–1	Stevenage	Northampton
15:00 BST	A.Odimayo (yellow card) 17'; S.Hoskins (yellow card) 69'	Report	C.Piergianni (yellow card) 4' (goal) 80'; D.Butler (yellow card) 88'; F.Burns (yellow card) 90+13'	Stadium: Sixfields Stadium; Attendance: 7,049 (961); Referee: Lewis Smith

12 August 2023 2	Wigan Athletic	2–1	Northampton Town	Wigan
15:00 BST	C.Lang (yellow card) 45+3'; S.Humphrys (yellow card) 62'; C.Hughes 72'; C.McManaman 79'; T.Pearce (yellow card) 87'; C.Sze (yellow card) 90+2'	Report	S.Hoskins 24'; J.Sowerby (yellow card) 27'; M.Leonard (yellow card) 60'; A.Odimayo (yellow card) 61'; J.Guthrie (yellow card) 68'	Stadium: DW Stadium; Attendance: 10,095 (866); Referee: Ross Joyce

15 August 2023 3	Northampton Town	2–2	Lincoln City	Northampton
19:45 BST	S.Hoskins (yellow card) 80' (goal) 90+8'; L.Appéré 86'	Report	R.Hackett-Fairchild 22'; P.O'Connor 78'	Stadium: Sixfields Stadium; Attendance: 6,188 (786); Referee: Ollie Yates

19 August 2023 4	Northampton Town	1–0	Peterborough United	Northampton
15:00 BST	M.Pinnock 90'; S.Hoskins (yellow card) 90+2'	Report	A.Collins (yellow card) 17'; P.Kioso (yellow card) 82'	Stadium: Sixfields Stadium; Attendance: 7,684 (1,451); Referee: Martin Woods

26 August 2023 5	Cheltenham Town	0–1	Northampton Town	Cheltenham
15:00 BST	L.Freestone (yellow card) 82'	Report	K.Bowie (yellow card) 14'; J.Guthrie (yellow card) 64'; S.Hoskins 88'	Stadium: Whaddon Road; Attendance: 3,907 (692); Referee: Tom Nield

2 September 2023 6	Northampton Town	0–1	Wycombe Wanderers	Northampton
15:00 BST		Report	R.Keogh 5'; K.Phillips (yellow card) 29'; T.De Barr (yellow card) 86'	Stadium: Sixfields Stadium; Attendance: 6,570 (863); Referee: Tom Reeves

16 September 2023 8	Port Vale	1–0	Northampton Town	Burslem
15:00 BST	E.Chislett (yellow card) 53'; B.Garrity 84'	Report		Stadium: Vale Park; Attendance: 7,532 (640); Referee: Scott Oldham

23 September 2023 9	Northampton Town	1–2	Barnsley	Northampton
15:00 BST	L.Appéré 90+8'	Report	C.Styles 4'; A.Phillips (yellow card) 12'; C.O'Keeffe (yellow card) 50'; K.Łopata (yellow card) 59'; J.McCart (yellow card) 82'; D.Cole 88'	Stadium: Sixfields Stadium; Attendance: 7,522 (1,391); Referee: Alan Young

30 September 2023 10	Exeter City	0–2	Northampton Town	Exeter
15:00 BST	Z.Jules (yellow card) 8'	Report	S.Hoskins 20'; K.Bowie (yellow card) 35'; P.Brough (yellow card) 41' (goal) 90+2'; S.Sherring (yellow card) 44'; A.Odimayo (yellow card) 62'; M.Monthé (yellow card) 84'	Stadium: St James Park; Attendance: 6,541 (365); Referee: Neil Hair

3 October 2023 11	Northampton Town	3–1	Reading	Northampton
19:45 BST	S.Hoskins 10'; L.Appéré 37'; S.McWilliams (yellow card) 80'; M.Pinnock 90+6'	Report	C.Savage (yellow card) 11'; K.Ehibhatiomhan (yellow card) 15'; D.Ballard 66'; C.Mola (yellow card) 78'; A.Yiadom (red card) 90+1'	Stadium: Sixfields Stadium; Attendance: 6,550 (1,285); Referee: Matthew Corlett

7 October 2023 12	Shrewsbury Town	1–0	Northampton Town	Shrewsbury
15:00 BST	N.Kenneh (yellow card) 4'; D.Udoh 90+1'	Report	M.Pinnock (yellow card) 20'; L.Appéré (yellow card) 37'; P.Brough (yellow card) 45+1'	Stadium: New Meadow; Attendance: 5,722 (760); Referee: Carl Brook

21 October 2023 14	Bolton Wanderers	2–1	Northampton Town	Horwich
15:00 BST	D.Charles 8'; R.Williams 16'	Report	S.Hoskins 66'; W.Hondermarck (yellow card) 86'	Stadium: Toughsheet Community Stadium; Attendance: 19,160 (750); Referee: Martin Coy

24 October 2023 15	Northampton Town	2–2	Leyton Orient	Northampton
19:45 BST	S.Hoskins 49', 52' (pen.); K.Bowie (red card) 58'; L.Burge (yellow card) 81'	Report	D.Happe (yellow card) 10'; R.Hunt 14'; B.Cooper (yellow card) 19'; S.Forde 90+6'; E.Turns (yellow card) 90+7'	Stadium: Sixfields Stadium; Attendance: 6,193 (716); Referee: Jacob Miles

28 October 2023 16	Bristol Rovers	2–1	Northampton Town	Bristol
15:00 BST	C.Martin 10' (yellow card) 41'; J.Grant (yellow card) 12'; A.Evans (yellow card) 18' (goal) 30' (pen.)	Report	M.Pinnock (yellow card) 54'; M.Monthé 57'	Stadium: Memorial Stadium; Attendance: 8,518 (596); Referee: Sunny Singh Gill

31 October 2023 7	Derby County	4–0	Northampton Town	Derby
19:45 GMT	M.Bird 14', 32'; C.Washington 22' (yellow card) 57'; N.Mendez-Laing 49'	Report	P.Brough (yellow card) 2'; A.Odimayo (yellow card) 71'	Stadium: Pride Park; Attendance: 24,719 (1,339); Referee: Simon Mather
Note: Fixture was previous postponed due to international call-ups.

11 November 2023 17	Northampton Town	2–0	Burton Albion	Northampton
15:00 GMT	M.Leonard 54'; S.Hoskins 78'	Report	J.Powell (yellow card) 25'; B.Lubala (yellow card) 90'	Stadium: Sixfields Stadium; Attendance: 6,640 (338); Referee: Scott Jackson

25 November 2023 19	Northampton Town	2–1	Cambridge United	Northampton
15:00 GMT	S.McWilliams (yellow card) 42'; K.Bowie 49'; S.Hoskins 55'	Report	J.Brophy (yellow card) 40'; G.Ahadme 77'; P.Digby (yellow card) 79' (yellow-red card) 80'; D.Andrew (yellow card) 90'	Stadium: Sixfields Stadium; Attendance: 6,929 (1,213); Referee: Lewis Smith

28 November 2023 20	Blackpool	1–2	Northampton Town	Blackpool
19:45 GMT	J.Rhodes 65'	Report	K.Bowie 31' (yellow card) 31'; A.Odimayo (yellow card) 34'; S.Hoskins (yellow card) 64' (goal) 75'; J.Sowerby (yellow card) 86'	Stadium: Bloomfield Road; Attendance: 9,058 (332); Referee: Geoff Eltringham

2 December 2023 13	Northampton Town	0–3	Portsmouth	Northampton
15:00 GMT	K.Bowie (yellow card) 47'	Report	S.Raggett 11'; W.Norris (yellow card) 22'; P.Lane 26', 48'	Stadium: Sixfields Stadium; Attendance: 7,215 (1,454); Referee: Darren Drysdale
Note: Fixture was previous postponed due to international call-ups.

9 December 2023 21	Northampton Town	3–0	Fleetwood Town	Northampton
15:00 GMT	M.Pinnock 27', 90+1'; S.Hoskins 31' (pen.); K.Bowie (yellow card) 49'	Report	D.Mayor (yellow card) 23'	Stadium: Sixfields Stadium; Attendance: 5,491 (97); Referee: Marc Edwards

16 December 2023 22	Carlisle United	2–2	Northampton Town	Carlisle
15:00 GMT	J.Armer 67'; R.Edmondson 81'	Report	S.McWilliams 30'; P.Brough (yellow card) 34'; K.Bowie (yellow card) 69' (goal) 90+3'	Stadium: Brunton Park; Attendance: 6,744 (371); Referee: Daniel Middleton

23 December 2023 23	Northampton Town	2–1	Oxford United	Northampton
15:00 GMT	K.Bowie 50'; P.Brough (yellow card) 66'; T.Simpson 90+7' (yellow card) 90+8'	Report	C.Brannagan 62' (pen.); C.Brown (yellow card) 90+2'	Stadium: Sixfields Stadium; Attendance: 7,581 (1,467); Referee: Craig Hicks

26 December 2023 24	Stevenage	3–0	Northampton Town	Stevenage
15:00 GMT	J.Reid 2'; J.Roberts 42'; E.List 67'	Report	J.Sowerby (yellow card) 52'	Stadium: Broadhall Way; Attendance: 5,164 (895); Referee: Will Finnie

29 December 2023 25	Lincoln City	1–2	Northampton Town	Lincoln
19:45 GMT	T.Bishop (yellow card) 41'; T.Eyoma 61'; P.O'Connor (red card) 76'	Report	W.Hondermarck (yellow card) 25'; J.Guthrie 30'; K.Bowie (yellow card) 45+2' (goal) 58'; A.Odimayo (yellow card) 90'; T.Simpson (yellow card) 90+4'; D.Hylton (yellow card) 90+8'	Stadium: Sincil Bank; Attendance: 8,661 (926); Referee: Matt Corlett

1 January 2024 26	Northampton Town	1–0	Cheltenham Town	Northampton
15:00 GMT	J.Willis (yellow card) 53'; K.Bowie 66' (pen.); T.Simpson (yellow card) 90+1'	Report	L.Smith (yellow card) 26'; L.Freestone (yellow card) 66'; S.Long (yellow card) 90'	Stadium: Sixfields Stadium; Attendance: 6,467 (361); Referee: Neil Hair

13 January 2024 28	Northampton Town	1–1	Wigan Athletic	Northampton
15:00 GMT	S.Hoskins 16' (pen.); M.Pinnock (yellow card) 58'; P.Brough (yellow card) 81'; S.McWilliams (yellow card) 87'	Report	S.Tickle (yellow card) 16'; J.Magennis (yellow card) 40' (goal) 64'; M.Smith (yellow card) 67'; C.Hughes (yellow card) 71'; J.Jones (yellow card) 87'; C.Wyke (yellow card) 90+3'	Stadium: Sixfields Stadium; Attendance: 6,664 (622); Referee: Anthony Backhouse

23 January 2024 18	Charlton Athletic	2–3	Northampton Town	Charlton, London
19:45 GMT	A.McGowan 20' (o.g.); T.Edun (yellow card) 32' (yellow-red card) 86'; T.Watson 45+3'; F.Ladapo (yellow card) 58'; T.Bakinson (yellow card) 69'; C.Coventry (yellow card) 71'	Report	T.Simpson 7'; S.Hoskins 22' (yellow card) 25'; K.Bowie (yellow card) 89'; L.Appéré 90+7'	Stadium: The Valley; Attendance: 10,943 (667); Referee: Paul Howard
Note: Fixture was previously postponed due to international call-ups.

27 January 2024 30	Northampton Town	0–2	Shrewsbury Town	Northampton
15:00 GMT		Report	D.Udoh 57' (yellow card) 58'; T.Bayliss (yellow card) 73'; C.Dunkley 75'; M.Feeney (yellow card) 90+3'	Stadium: Sixfields Stadium; Attendance: 7,186 (771); Referee: Seb Stockbridge

3 February 2024 31	Portsmouth	4–1	Northampton Town	Portsmouth
15:00 GMT	C.Ogilvie 7'; P.Lane 16', 58'; T.McIntyre (red card) 54'; C.Lang 71'; J.Sparkes (yellow card) 90+5'	Report	J.Guthrie (yellow card) 42'; M.Leonard 89'	Stadium: Fratton Park; Attendance: 19,245 (756); Referee: Sam Purkiss

10 February 2024 32	Northampton Town	1–1	Bolton Wanderers	Northampton
15:00 GMT	K.Bowie 2'	Report	V.Adeboyejo (yellow card) 23'; G.Thomason (red card) 27'; J.Sheehan (yellow card) 54'; C.Mendes Gomes 74'; G.Jones (yellow card) 90+1'	Stadium: Sixfields Stadium; Attendance: 7,593 (1,370); Referee: Jeremy Simpson

13 February 2024 33	Leyton Orient	4–3	Northampton Town	Leyton, London
19:45 GMT	I.El Mizouni (yellow card) 21'; O.O'Neill 35'; J.Brown (yellow card) 41'; S.Forde 58'; R.Sotiriou 80', 90+7'	Report	D.Gape (yellow card) 31'; M.Leonard 45+1'; K.Bowie 77'; T.Simpson 83'; J.Guthrie (yellow card) 90+6'	Stadium: Brisbane Road; Attendance: 7,228 (573); Referee: Ben Atkinson

17 February 2024 34	Northampton Town	3–1	Bristol Rovers	Northampton
15:00 GMT	P.Brough 3' (yellow card) 52'; M.Pinnock 40'; M.Leonard 84'; L.Moulden (yellow card) 79'	Report	J.Wilson (yellow card) 24'; C.Martin 79'	Stadium: Sixfields Stadium; Attendance: 6,817 (872); Referee: Adam Herczeg

20 February 2024 29	Oxford United	2–2	Northampton Town	Oxford
19:45 GMT	J.Murphy 6'; W.Goodwin 81'; R.Rodrigues (yellow card) 89'	Report	W.Hondermarck 35' (yellow card) 74'; T.Simpson (yellow card) 78'; M.Pinnock (yellow card) 82'; S.Hoskins (yellow card) 90'; T.Springett 90+2'	Stadium: Kassam Stadium; Attendance: 8,732 (1,268); Referee: Charles Breakspear
Note: Fixture was originally scheduled for 20 January, but was postponed due to a frozen pitch.

24 February 2024 35	Burton Albion	0–2	Northampton Town	Burton upon Trent
15:00 GMT		Report	M.Leonard 22' (yellow card) 90+4'; M.Pinnock 36'; L.Moulden (yellow card) 47'	Stadium: Pirelli Stadium; Attendance: 3,953 (1,150); Referee: Tom Reeves

2 March 2024 36	Northampton Town	1–1	Charlton Athletic	Northampton
15:00 GMT	T.Simpson (yellow card) 33'; P.Brough (yellow card) 76'; L.Appéré 80'	Report	K.Anderson 4'; C.Coventry (yellow card) 71'; R.Edmonds-Green (yellow card) 90+2'	Stadium: Sixfields Stadium; Attendance: 7,710 (1,469); Referee: Martin Woods

5 March 2024 27	Peterborough United	5–1	Northampton Town	Peterborough
19:45 GMT	E.Mason-Clark 25'; K.Poku 28'; J.Randall 45'; H.Kyprianou 59'; J.Knight 64'; M.Mothersille (yellow card) 75'	Report	J.Guthrie 9'; K.Bowie (yellow card) 39'	Stadium: London Road; Attendance: 9,028 (1,674); Referee: Craig Hicks
Note: Fixture was originally scheduled for 6 January, but was postponed due to the hosts involvement in the FA Cup.

9 March 2024 37	Cambridge United	1–1	Northampton Town	Cambridge
15:00 GMT	E.Kachunga 16'; P.Digby (yellow card) 81'	Report	J.Guthrie 82'	Stadium: Abbey Stadium; Attendance: 6,942 (1,089); Referee: Declan Bourne

12 March 2024 38	Northampton Town	0–1	Blackpool	Northampton
19:45 GMT	J.Sowerby (yellow card) 5'	Report	M.Pennington 55'	Stadium: Sixfields Stadium; Attendance: 5,472 (323); Referee: James Bell

16 March 2024 39	Wycombe Wanderers	2–0	Northampton Town	High Wycombe
15:00 GMT	M.Butcher 69', 84'; R.Kone (yellow card) 79'	Report	M.Monthé (yellow card) 29'; J.Sowerby (yellow card) 36'; A.McGowan (yellow card) 90+5'	Stadium: Adams Park; Attendance: 4,583 (655); Referee: Ollie Yates

23 March 2024 40	Northampton Town	1–0	Derby County	Northampton
15:00 GMT	M.Pinnock (yellow card) 14'; S.Hoskins 23'; M.Leonard (yellow card) 65'	Report	L.Sibley (yellow card) 45'; E.Cashin (yellow card) 50'; S.Bradley (red card) 90+10'	Stadium: Sixfields Stadium; Attendance: 7,679 (1,463); Referee: Scott Oldham

29 March 2024 41	Reading	1–0	Northampton Town	Reading
15:00 GMT	B.Elliott (yellow card) 22'; K.Ehibhatiomhan 65'	Report	M.Monthé (yellow card) 4'	Stadium: Madejski Stadium; Attendance: 15,451 (1,112); Referee: Thomas Parsons

1 April 2024 42	Northampton Town	2–0	Port Vale	Northampton
15:00 BST	M.Pinnock 34'; L.Burge (yellow card) 78'; S.McWilliams 90+4' (yellow card) 90+5'	Report	B.Garrity (yellow card) 16'; J.Weir (yellow card) 64'	Stadium: Sixfields Stadium; Attendance: 6,739 (736); Referee: Lee Swabey

6 April 2024 43	Northampton Town	2–0	Carlisle United	Northampton
15:00 BST	K.Bowie 33'; A.Koiki 90+4'	Report		Stadium: Sixfields Stadium; Attendance: 6,328 (335); Referee: Ross Joyce

13 April 2024 44	Fleetwood Town	2–0	Northampton Town	Fleetwood
15:00 BST	P.Omochere 5'; B.Lawal 30' (yellow card) 84'; D.Mayor (yellow card) 65'; R.Broom (yellow card) 71'	Report	A.McGowan (yellow card) 17'; K.Bowie (yellow card) 80'	Stadium: Highbury Stadium; Attendance: Not announced Referee: Thomas Kirk

20 April 2024 45	Northampton Town	1–2	Exeter City	Northampton
14:00 BST	J.Guthrie (yellow card) 45' (goal) 73'	Report	L.Harris 20'; R.Woods (red card) 44'; W.Aimson 83'	Stadium: Sixfields Stadium; Attendance: 7,097 (647); Referee: Ruebyn Ricardo
Note: Fixture was initially scheduled to kick-off at 15:00, but was moved to avoid a logistical issue with Northampton Saints fixture the same day.

27 April 2024 46	Barnsley	1–1	Northampton Town	Barnsley
12:30 BST	H.Kane 18' (yellow card) 90+5'; M.Durand de Gevigney (yellow card) 21'; C.O'Keeffe (yellow card) 43'	Report	S.McWilliams (yellow card) 90+5'; L.Appéré 90+6'	Stadium: Oakwell; Attendance: 15,108 (1,222); Referee: Ollie Yates

=== FA Cup ===
Northampton Town were drawn at home to Barrow in the first round.

4 November 2023 First round	Northampton Town	1–3	Barrow	Northampton
13:30 GMT	M.Pinnock 29' (yellow card) 85'; W.Hondermarck (yellow card) 45'; S.Hoskins (yellow card) 68'	Report	E.Acquah 9'; M.Ogungbo (yellow card) 21'; T.White 52'; B.Whitfield 72'	Stadium: Sixfields Stadium; Attendance: 3,187 (168); Referee: Paul Howard

=== EFL Cup ===
Northampton were drawn away to Swansea City in the first round.

8 August 2023 First round	Swansea City	3–0	Northampton Town	Swansea, Wales
19:30 BST	J.Piroe 10', 53'; J.Ginnelly 90+4'	Report	M.Pinnock (yellow card) 57'	Stadium: Swansea.com Stadium; Attendance: 6,923 (away fans not confirmed); Referee: Peter Wright

=== EFL Trophy ===
In the group stage, Northampton Town were drawn alongside Milton Keynes Dons, Oxford United and Chelsea Under-21s.

Pos	Div	Team	Pld	W	PW	PL	L	GF	GA	GD	Pts	Qualification
1	L2	Milton Keynes Dons	3	3	0	0	0	8	3	+5	9	Advance to Round 2
2	L1	Oxford United	3	2	0	0	1	8	2	+6	6	Advance to Round 2
3	ACA	Chelsea U21	3	0	1	0	2	3	11	−8	2	
4	L1	Northampton Town	3	0	0	1	2	5	8	−3	1	

Updated to match(es) played on 7 November 2023. Source: EFL.com

5 September 2023 Group stage	Northampton Town	1–3	Oxford United	Northampton
19:00 BST	T.Simpson 4' (pen.); S.McWilliams (yellow card) 32'; A.McGowan (yellow card) 58'; M.Dyche (red card) 76'	Report	M.Harris 15' (pen.), 61'; J.Murphy (yellow card) 44'; K.Edwards 48'	Stadium: Sixfields Stadium; Attendance: 1,608 (411); Referee: Garreth Rhodes

26 September 2023 Group stage	Northampton Town	2–2 (3–4 p)	Chelsea U21	Northampton
19:00 BST	S.McWilliams 22'; T.Simpson 24'	Report	R.Stutter 11'; H.Murray-Campbell (yellow card) 26'; M.Golding 36'	Stadium: Sixfields Stadium; Attendance: 2,004 (155); Referee: David Rock
	Penalties
	H.Lintott (penalty missed); R.Wyatt (penalty scored); P.Abimbola (penalty scored); N.Dobson (penalty scored); M.Monthé (penalty missed)		D.Williams (penalty scored); L.Castledine (penalty scored); S.Rak-Sakyi (penalty scored); T.George (penalty scored)

21 November 2023 Group stage	Milton Keynes Dons	3–2	Northampton Town	Bletchley
19:00 GMT	C.Waller 56'; D.Burns 64'; D.Devoy 84'	Report	T.Simpson (yellow card) 28' (goal) 82' (pen.); M.Monthé 36'; W.Hondermarck (yellow card) 85'	Stadium: Stadium MK; Attendance: 1,648 (427); Referee: Sam Purkiss

=== Appearances, goals and cards ===
No.	Pos	Player	League One			FA Cup			EFL Cup			EFL Trophy			Total			Discipline	
No.	Pos	Player	Starts	Sub	Goals	Starts	Sub	Goals	Starts	Sub	Goals	Starts	Sub	Goals	Starts	Sub	Goals	Yellow card	Red card
1	GK	Lee Burge	20	–	–	–	–	–	–	–	–	–	–	–	20	–	–	2	–
2	CB	Tyler Magloire	–	–	–	–	–	–	–	–	–	–	–	–	–	–	–	–	–
3	RB	Aaron McGowan	18	10	–	–	1	–	1	–	–	2	–	–	21	11	–	2	–
4	CM	Jack Sowerby	24	6	–	–	1	–	–	1	–	–	1	–	24	9	–	5	–
5	CB	Jon Guthrie	33	3	4	–	–	–	–	–	–	1	–	–	34	3	4	5	–
6	CB	Sam Sherring	37	–	–	1	–	–	1	–	–	1	–	–	40	–	–	1	–
7	W	Sam Hoskins	34	4	15	1	–	–	–	1	–	–	–	–	35	5	15	6	–
8	CM	Ben Fox	9	10	–	–	–	–	–	–	–	1	–	–	10	10	–	–	–
9	ST	Louis Appéré	16	21	6	–	1	–	1	–	–	2	–	–	19	22	6	1	–
10	ST	Danny Hylton	–	4	–	–	–	–	–	–	–	–	–	–	–	4	–	1	–
11	W	Mitch Pinnock	44	1	7	1	–	1	1	–	–	–	1	–	46	2	8	6	–
12	CB	Manny Monthé	12	21	1	–	1	–	1	–	–	3	–	1	16	22	2	3	–
14	LB	Ali Koiki	2	9	1	1	–	–	1	–	–	1	–	–	5	9	1	–	–
15	CB	Jordan Willis	21	6	–	1	–	–	–	–	–	–	–	–	22	6	–	1	–
16	ST	Tyreece Simpson	18	22	3	–	1	–	–	–	–	3	–	3	21	23	6	5	–
17	CM	Shaun McWilliams	23	13	2	1	–	–	–	–	–	2	–	1	26	13	3	5	–
19	ST	Kieron Bowie	40	4	9	–	–	–	1	–	–	–	–	–	41	4	9	10	1
20	RB	Harvey Lintott	4	12	–	–	–	–	–	–	–	3	–	–	7	12	–	–	–
21	CM	Marc Leonard	46	–	5	1	–	–	1	–	–	1	–	–	49	–	5	3	–
22	CB	Akin Odimayo	22	7	–	1	–	–	–	1	–	1	–	–	24	8	–	6	–
23	CM	Will Hondermarck	12	17	1	1	–	–	1	–	–	1	–	–	15	17	1	2	–
24	LB	Ryan Haynes	–	3	–	–	–	–	–	–	–	2	–	–	2	3	–	–	–
26	CB	Liam Moore	5	3	–	–	–	–	–	–	–	–	–	–	5	3	–	–	–
28	W	Tony Springett	1	12	1	–	–	–	–	–	–	–	–	–	1	12	1	–	–
29	DM	Dominic Gape	2	–	–	–	–	–	–	–	–	–	–	–	2	–	–	1	–
31	GK	Louie Moulden	11	1	–	–	–	–	–	–	–	–	–	–	11	1	–	2	–
33	LB	Patrick Brough	37	–	2	1	–	–	–	1	–	–	1	–	38	2	2	8	–
35	CB	Max Dyche	–	4	–	–	–	–	1	–	–	1	1	–	2	5	–	–	–
Youth team scholars:
37	CM	Jacob Scott	–	–	–	–	–	–	–	–	–	–	3	–	–	3	–	–	–
38	ST	Jamari Hart	–	–	–	–	–	–	–	–	–	1	–	–	1	–	–	–	–
39	LB	Matthew Ireland	–	–	–	–	–	–	–	–	–	–	1	–	–	1	–	–	–
40	ST	Neo Dobson	–	–	–	–	–	–	–	–	–	–	2	–	–	2	–	–	–
41	CM	Reuben Wyatt	–	–	–	–	–	–	–	–	–	1	1	–	1	1	–	–	–
43	CB	Tom Cartwright	–	–	–	–	–	–	–	–	–	–	1	–	–	1	–	–	–
Out on loan:
25	CB	Josh Tomlinson	–	–	–	–	–	–	–	–	–	1	–	–	1	–	–	–	–
27	CM	Peter Abimbola	–	1	–	–	–	–	–	1	–	2	–	–	2	2	–	–	–
36	GK	James Dadge	–	–	–	–	–	–	–	–	–	–	–	–	–	–	–	–	–
Players no longer at club:
26	GK	Max Thompson	15	–	–	1	–	–	1	–	–	3	–	–	20	–	–	–	–

== Awards ==
=== Club awards ===
At the end of the season, Northampton's annual award ceremony, including categories voted for by the players and backroom staff, the supporters, will see the players recognised for their achievements for the club throughout the 2023–24 season.

Player of the Year Award	Marc Leonard
Players' Player of the Year Award	Marc Leonard
Academy Player of the Year Award	Reuben Wyatt
Goal of the Season Award	Kieron Bowie (vs. Lincoln City)

=== Divisional awards ===
Date	Nation	Winner	Award
November 2023	(England)	Sam Hoskins	EFL League One Player of the Month

== Transfers ==
=== Transfers in ===
Date from	Position	Nationality	Name	From	Fee	Ref.
1 July 2023 (Note: The transfer was announced on 15 June, and would become official on 1 July once his Barrow contract expired)	LB	(England)	Patrick Brough	(England) Barrow	Free transfer	
14 July 2023	CB	(Cameroon)	Manny Monthé	(England) Walsall	Free transfer	
7 October 2023	CB	(England)	Jordan Willis	Free agent	Free transfer	
3 February 2024	CM	(England)	Dominic Gape	Free agent	Free transfer	
13 February 2024	CB	(England)	Liam Moore	Free agent	Free transfer	

=== Loans in ===
Date from	Position	Nationality	Name	Loaned from	On loan until	Ref.
3 July 2023	CF	(Scotland)	Kieron Bowie	(England) Fulham	End of season	
26 July 2023	CF	(England)	Tyreece Simpson	(England) Huddersfield Town	End of season	
29 July 2023	CM	(Scotland)	Marc Leonard	(England) Brighton & Hove Albion	End of season	
7 August 2023	GK	(England)	Max Thompson	(England) Newcastle United	11 January 2024	
15 January 2024	W	(Republic of Ireland)	Tony Springett	(England) Norwich City	End of season	
16 January 2024	GK	(England)	Louie Moulden	(England) Wolverhampton Wanderers	End of season	

=== Transfers out ===
Date from	Position	Nationality	Name	To	Fee	Ref.
30 June 2023	CF	(England)	Jack Connor	(England) Cogenhoe United	Released	
30 June 2023 (Note: The transfer was announced on 23 June, and would become official on 1 July once his contract at the club expired)	W	(England)	Liam Cross	(England) Brackley Town	Released	
30 June 2023	AM	(England)	Josh Harrop	(England) Cheltenham Town	Released	
30 June 2023	GK	(England)	Jonny Maxted	(Wales) Newport County	Released	
30 June 2023	CB	(Canada)	David Norman Jr.	(Republic of Ireland) St Patrick's Athletic	Released	
30 June 2023	W	(England)	Miguel Ngwa	(England) Barwell	Released	
30 June 2023	LB	(England)	Paul Osew	(England) Woking	Released	
3 July 2023	GK	(Wales)	Tom King	(England) Wolverhampton Wanderers	Rejected contract	
20 July 2023	RW	(England)	Kai O'Keeffe	(England) Kettering Town	Free transfer	

=== Loans out ===
Date from	Position	Nationality	Name	Loaned to	On loan until	Ref.
11 September 2023	CB	(England)	Max Dyche	(England) Aldershot Town	9 October 2023	
5 October 2023	CM	(England)	Peter Abimbola	(England) St Ives Town	2 November 2023	
5 October 2023	CB	(England)	Josh Tomlinson	(England) St Ives Town	2 November 2023	
7 October 2023	GK	(England)	James Dadge	(England) Harborough Town	Work experience	
21 October 2023	CM	(England)	Jacob Scott	(England) AFC Rushden & Diamonds	Work experience	
21 October 2023	CM	(England)	Reuben Wyatt	(England) AFC Rushden & Diamonds	Work experience	
18 December 2023	CB	(England)	Tom Cartwright	(England) AFC Rushden & Diamonds	15 January 2024	
5 January 2024	GK	(England)	James Dadge	(England) St Ives Town	Work experience	
27 January 2024	CB	(England)	Max Dyche	(England) Woking	End of season	
17 February 2024	CM	(England)	Peter Abimbola	(England) Bromsgrove Sporting	17 March 2024	
