= Marc Leonard =

Scottish footballer

Personal information
- Full name: Marc Henry Leonard
- Date of birth: 19 December 2001 (age 24)
- Place of birth: Glasgow, Scotland
- Height: 1.80 m (5 ft 11 in)
- Position: Midfielder

Team information
- Current team: Birmingham City
- Number: 12

Youth career
- Rangers
- 2014–2018: Heart of Midlothian
- 2018–2022: Brighton & Hove Albion

Senior career*
Years	Team	Apps	(Gls)
2021–2024	Brighton & Hove Albion	0	(0)
2022–2023	→ Northampton Town (loan)	45	(1)
2023–2024	→ Northampton Town (loan)	46	(5)
2024–	Birmingham City	50	(0)
2026	→ Heart of Midlothian (loan)	13	(1)

International career
2017–2018	Scotland U17	8	(0)
2018	Scotland U18	2	(0)
2019	Scotland U19	5	(0)
2021–2022	Scotland U21	7	(0)
- * Club domestic league appearances and goals as of 12 May 2026

Marc Henry Leonard (born 19 December 2001) is a Scottish professional football midfielder. He plays for EFL Championship club Birmingham City.

He began his career in youth football with Rangers and Heart of Midlothian before joining English Premier League club Brighton & Hove Albion in 2018. He spent two seasons on loan at Northampton Town, helping them gain promotion to EFL League One in 2022–23 and winning their Player of the Season award the following season, before joining Birmingham City in 2024. Internationally, he has represented Scotland at youth levels up to under-21.

== Club career ==
=== Brighton & Hove Albion ===
In 2018, Leonard, a former Rangers youth player, joined the academy of Brighton & Hove Albion from Heart of Midlothian.

Leonard made his professional debut on 24 August 2021, starting in the 2–0 away victory over Cardiff City in the EFL Cup second round. He was named in a Premier League matchday squad for the first time in a 1–0 home loss against Wolverhampton Wanderers on 15 December.

==== Northampton Town (loan) ====
On 25 July 2022, Leonard signed for EFL League Two club Northampton Town on loan for the duration of the 2022–23 season. His first professional goal, a precise finish from the edge of the box, opened the scoring in a 2–2 draw at home to Sutton United on 25 October. Leonard played 45 matches in the league, including the 1–0 away win over Tranmere Rovers on the last day of the season that sealed third place and promotion to League One.

On 29 July 2023, Leonard re-joined Northampton Town for a second season on loan. He was named in the starting eleven for all 46 league games, was pivotal in securing a successful first season back in League One for the club, and won both the fans' Player of the Season and players' Player of the Season awards.

=== Birmingham City ===
On 25 July 2024, recently relegated League One club Birmingham City signed Leonard on a four-year contract. The fee was undisclosed. He made his debut in the starting eleven for the opening fixture of the season, a 1–1 draw at home to Reading.

==== Heart of Midlothian (loan) ====
On 23 January 2026, Leonard returned to Scottish Premiership side Heart of Midlothian on loan until the end of the 2025/26 season. He scored his first goal for the club in a 4-2 defeat against Rangers at Ibrox.

== International career ==
After representing Scotland at under-17, under-18 and under-19 level, he made his Scotland U21 debut on 7 October 2021, coming on as a 72nd-minute substitute in the 1–0 home loss against Denmark U21 in the 2023 European qualifiers.

== Career statistics ==
As of 12 May 2026

Appearances and goals by club, season and competition
Club	Season	League			National cup (Note: Includes Scottish Cup, FA Cup)		League cup (Note: Includes Scottish League Cup, EFL Cup)		Other		Total	
Club	Season	Division	Apps	Goals	Apps	Goals	Apps	Goals	Apps	Goals	Apps	Goals
Brighton & Hove Albion	2021–22	Premier League	0	0	0	0	2	0	—		2	0
Brighton & Hove Albion	2022–23	Premier League	0	0	0	0	0	0	—		0	0
Brighton & Hove Albion	2023–24	Premier League	0	0	0	0	0	0	—		0	0
Brighton & Hove Albion	Total		0	0	0	0	2	0	0	0	2	0
Brighton & Hove Albion U23	2021–22	—			—		—		3 (Note: Appearance(s) in EFL Trophy)	0	3	0
Northampton Town (loan)	2022–23	League Two	45	1	1	0	1	0	1	0	48	1
Northampton Town (loan)	2023–24	League One	46	5	1	0	1	0	1	0	49	5
Northampton Town (loan)	Total		91	6	2	0	2	0	2	0	97	6
Birmingham City	2024–25	League One	35	0	3	0	2	0	7	0	47	0
Birmingham City	2025–26	Championship	15	0	0	0	2	0	—		17	0
Birmingham City	Total		50	0	3	0	4	0	7	0	64	0
Heart of Midlothian (loan)	2025–26	Scottish Premiership	13	1	—		—		—		13	1
Career total			154	7	5	0	8	0	12	0	179	7

== Honours ==
Northampton Town

- EFL League Two promotion: 2022–23

Birmingham City

- EFL League One: 2024–25
- EFL Trophy runner-up: 2024–25

Individual

- Northampton Town Player of the Year: 2023–24
