= 2021–22 Gillingham F.C. season =

English football club season

Gillingham
2021–22 season
- Chairman: Paul Scally
- Manager: Steve Evans (until 9 January); Neil Harris (from 31 January)
- Stadium: Priestfield Stadium
- League One: 21st (relegated)
- FA Cup: First round
- EFL Cup: Second round
- EFL Trophy: Group stage
- Top goalscorer: League: Vadaine Oliver (10); All: Vadaine Oliver (11)
- Highest home attendance: 8,542 vs Rotherham United (30 April 2022); League One
- Lowest home attendance: 1,116 vs Ipswich Town (5 October 2021); EFL Trophy
- Average home league attendance: 5,167
Home colours	Away colours

The 2021–22 season was Gillingham's 129th year in their history and ninth consecutive season in League One. Along with the league, the club also competed in the FA Cup, the EFL Cup and the 2021–22 EFL Trophy. The season covered the period from 1 July 2021 to 30 June 2022.

== Pre-season friendlies ==
As part of their pre-season preparations, Gillingham announced friendly matches against Chatham Town, Welling United, Dartford, Queens Park Rangers, Ebbsfleet United, Peterborough United, Colchester United, Millwall, Leyton Orient and Norwich City.

However, the scheduled friendlies against Dartford, Queens Park Rangers, Peterborough United and Ebbsfleet United were cancelled due to a number of players testing positive for COVID-19.

3 July 2021 Friendly	Chatham Town	3–2	Gillingham XI	Chatham
13:00 BST	Lawal 25'; Robins 53'; Strouts 73'	Report	Gbode 9'; Sithole 23'	Stadium: The Bauvill Stadium

10 July 2021 Friendly	Welling United	3–3	Gillingham	Welling
13:00 BST	Akinyemi 27', 28'; Della-Verde 73' (pen.)	Report	Lloyd 7'; Oliver 14'; Akinde 90'	Stadium: Park View Road

13 July 2021 Friendly	Dartford	Cancelled	Gillingham	Dartford
19:00 BST				Stadium: Princes Park
Note: Match cancelled due to positive COVID-19 test results.

16 July 2021 Friendly	Gillingham	Cancelled	Queens Park Rangers	Gillingham
19:00 BST				Stadium: Priestfield Stadium
Note: Match cancelled due to positive COVID-19 test results.

17 July 2021 Friendly	Ebbsfleet United	Cancelled	Gillingham XI	Northfleet
14:00 BST				Stadium: Stonebridge Road
Note: Match cancelled due to positive COVID-19 test results.

20 July 2021 Friendly	Gillingham	Cancelled	Peterborough United	Gillingham
18:00 BST				Stadium: Priestfield Stadium
Note: Match cancelled due to positive COVID-19 test results.

24 July 2021 Friendly	Colchester United	0–2	Gillingham	Colchester
13:00 BST		Report	Reeves 10'; Tucker 80'	Stadium: JobServe Community Stadium; Referee: Alan Dale

27 July 2021 Friendly	Gillingham	1–1	Millwall	Gillingham
19:00 BST	Dempsey 11'	Report	Cooper 85'	Stadium: Priestfield Stadium; Referee: Gavin Ward

31 July 2021 Friendly	Leyton Orient	2–0	Gillingham	Leyton
14:00 BST	Beckles 13'; Trialist 37'	Report		Stadium: Breyer Group Stadium; Referee: Craig Hicks

3 August 2021 Friendly	Norwich City	5–0	Gillingham	Norwich
20:00 BST	Lees-Melou 10'; Idah 36', 73'; Rupp 61'; Sørensen 90'	Report		Stadium: Carrow Road; Attendance: 10,692; Referee: Andy Woolmer

== Competitions ==
=== League One ===
==== League table ====
Pos	Team	Pld	W	D	L	GF	GA	GD	Pts	Promotion, qualification or relegation
17	Lincoln City	46	14	10	22	55	63	−8	52	
18	Shrewsbury Town	46	12	14	20	47	51	−4	50	
19	Morecambe	46	10	12	24	57	88	−31	42	
20	Fleetwood Town	46	8	16	22	62	82	−20	40	
21	Gillingham (R)	46	8	16	22	35	69	−34	40	Relegation to EFL League Two
22	Doncaster Rovers (R)	46	10	8	28	37	82	−45	38	Relegation to EFL League Two
23	AFC Wimbledon (R)	46	6	19	21	49	75	−26	37	Relegation to EFL League Two
24	Crewe Alexandra (R)	46	7	8	31	37	83	−46	29	Relegation to EFL League Two

Source: EFL Official Website
Rules for classification: 1) Points; 2) Goal difference; 3) Number of goals scored; 4) Head-to-head results; 5) Wins; 6) Away goals; 7) Penalty points based on yellow and red cards received excluding the last four games of the season (sec 9.5); 8) 12-point sending off offences; 9) If the tie affects the automatic promotion or relegation places, a play-off game or games would be held between the two tied teams
(R) Relegated

==== Results summary ====
Overall								Home						Away					
Pld	W	D	L	GF	GA	GD	Pts	W	D	L	GF	GA	GD	W	D	L	GF	GA	GD
46	8	16	22	35	69	−34	40	4	8	11	13	36	−23	4	8	11	22	33	−11

Last updated: 30 April 2022.

==== Matches ====
Gills' fixtures were announced on 24 June 2021.

7 August 2021 1	Gillingham	1–1	Lincoln City	Gillingham
15:00 BST	Lloyd 44'; Phillips (yellow card) 63'; Tutonda (yellow card) 68' Steve Evans (yellow card)	Report	Edun 4', (yellow card) 17'; Bramall (yellow card) 6'	Stadium: Priestfield Stadium; Attendance: 5,486; Referee: Thomas Bramall

14 August 2021 2	Plymouth Argyle	1–0	Gillingham	Plymouth
15:00 BST	Jephcott 88'; Houghton (yellow card) 90+5'	Report	O'Keefe (yellow card) 44'; Tucker (yellow card) 62'	Stadium: Home Park; Attendance: 10,854; Referee: Charles Breakspear

17 August 2021 3	AFC Wimbledon	1–1	Gillingham	Wimbledon
19:45 BST	Mebude (yellow card) 39'; Nightingale (yellow card) 73'; Palmer 85', (yellow card) 87'; Assal (yellow card) 90+6'	Report	McKenzie (yellow card) 11'; Tutonda (yellow card) 55' (yellow-red card) 72'; Tucker (yellow card) 66'; O'Keefe (yellow card) 90+2'; Kalambayi 90+7' (o.g.); Oliver (yellow card) 90+7'	Stadium: Plough Lane; Referee: Carl Brook

21 August 2021 4	Gillingham	2–1	Morecambe	Gillingham
15:00 BST	Carayol 4'; Oliver 79' (pen.), (yellow card) 90+1'	Report	Stockton 25'; Cooney (yellow card) 46'; Lavelle (yellow card) 51'	Stadium: Priestfield Stadium; Attendance: 3,789; Referee: Tom Nield

28 August 2021 5	Shrewsbury Town	2–1	Gillingham	Shrewsbury
15:00 BST	Bloxham 59'; Cosgrove 68'; Davis (yellow card) 90+3' (yellow-red card) 90+8'	Report	Tucker 12'; Adshead (yellow card) 43'; Phillips (yellow card) 90+2' (yellow-red card) 90+8'	Stadium: Montgomery Waters Meadow; Attendance: 4,625; Referee: Sam Allison

11 September 2021 6	Burton Albion	1–1	Gillingham	Burton upon Trent
15:00 BST	Hemmings 46'	Report	Oliver 18'; Tucker (yellow card) 40'; Ehmer (yellow card) 60'	Stadium: Pirelli Stadium; Attendance: 2,555; Referee: Carl Boyeson

18 September 2021 7	Gillingham	1–4	Milton Keynes Dons	Gillingham
15:00 BST	Oliver 20'; O'Keefe (yellow card) 22' (yellow-red card) 26'; Tucker (yellow card) 68'	Report	Robson (yellow card) 24'; Twine (penalty missed) 28', 28'; Kioso 39', (yellow card) 65'; Ehmer 82' (o.g.); Watters 88'	Stadium: Priestfield; Attendance: 4,119; Referee: John Busby

21 September 2021 8	Gillingham	1–1	Charlton Athletic	Gillingham
19:45 BST	Ehmer (yellow card) 48'; Purrington 56' (o.g.); Lee (yellow card) 76'	Report	Lee 18'	Stadium: Priestfield; Attendance: 7,301; Referee: Keith Stroud

25 September 2021 9	Oxford United	1–1	Gillingham	Oxford
15:00 BST	Taylor 5'	Report	MacDonald 30'; Tucker (yellow card) 44'; Cumming (yellow card) 85'	Stadium: The Kassam Stadium; Attendance: 6,664; Referee: Darren Drysdale

28 September 2021 10	Cambridge United	0–2	Gillingham	Cambridge
19:45 BST	Jones (yellow card) 72'	Report	Tutonda (yellow card) 19'; Ehmer (yellow card) 22'; Oliver 26'; Lloyd 60'; Cumming (yellow card) 90+7'	Stadium: Abbey Stadium; Attendance: 4,019; Referee: James Bell

2 October 2021 11	Gillingham	0–2	Wigan Athletic	Gillingham
15:00 BST	Dempsey (yellow card) 36'	Report	Naylor (yellow card) 14'; Power 64'; Keane 82'; Massey (yellow card) 86'	Stadium: Priestfield; Attendance: 4,503; Referee: Neil Hair

9 October 2021 12	Wycombe Wanderers	2–0	Gillingham	High Wycombe
15:00 BST	McCleary 2'; Hanlan 7'	Report	Oliver (penalty missed) 31', (yellow card) 37'	Stadium: Adams Park; Attendance: 4,992; Referee: Kevin Friend

16 October 2021 13	Gillingham	1–2	Sunderland	Gillingham
15:00 BST	Lloyd 25' (pen.); Kelman (yellow card) 90+3'	Report	Cirkin (yellow card) 43'; O'Brien 45+3'; Flanagan 54'; Embleton (red card) 67'; Stewart (yellow card) 84'	Stadium: Priestfield; Attendance: 6,310; Referee: Lee Swabey

19 October 2021 14	Gillingham	1–0	Doncaster Rovers	Gillingham
19:45 BST	Oliver (yellow card) 41'; O'Keefe (yellow card) 76', (goal) 79'	Report	Knoyle (yellow card) 52'; Williams (yellow card) 70'	Stadium: Priestfield; Attendance: 3,713; Referee: Sam Purkiss

23 October 2021 15	Bolton Wanderers	2–2	Gillingham	Horwich
15:00 BST	Afolayan (yellow card) 71', (goal) 86'; Lee 90+1'	Report	Akinde 11'; Dempsey 14', (yellow card) 40'; Tucker (yellow card) 56'; O'Keefe (yellow card) 67'	Stadium: University of Bolton Stadium; Attendance: 13,807; Referee: Ben Toner

30 October 2021 16	Gillingham	0–0	Accrington Stanley	Gillingham
15:00 BST	Tucker (yellow card) 90+3'	Report	Sykes (yellow card) 62'; Morgan (yellow card) 84'	Stadium: Priestfield; Attendance: 3,609; Referee: Christopher Pollard

13 November 2021 17	Sheffield Wednesday	1–1	Gillingham	Owlerton
15:00 GMT	Kamberi 75'; Johnson (yellow card) 81'	Report	Oliver 22'; Phillips (yellow card) 30'; Akinde (yellow card) 90+6'	Stadium: Hillsborough; Attendance: 20,593; Referee: John Busby

20 November 2021 18	Crewe Alexandra	2–0	Gillingham	Crewe
15:00 GMT	Long 11'; Offord (yellow card) 68'; Lowery 90+1'	Report	O'Keefe (yellow card) 47'; Phillips (yellow card) 61'	Stadium: Alexandra Stadium; Attendance: 4,047; Referee: Anthony Backhouse

23 November 2021 19	Gillingham	0–2	Cheltenham Town	Gillingham
19:45 GMT	Ehmer (yellow card) 53'	Report	Long 30'; May 60'; Flinders (yellow card) 69'	Stadium: Priestfield; Attendance: 3,115; Referee: James Linington

27 November 2021 20	Gillingham	0–1	Portsmouth	Gillingham
15:00 GMT		Report	Romeo (yellow card) 82'; Tucker 90+3' (o.g.)	Stadium: Priestfield; Attendance: 5,637; Referee: Dean Whitestone

7 December 2021 21	Rotherham United	5–1	Gillingham	Rotherham
19:45 GMT	Ladapo 39'; Miller 45'; Barlaser 59' (pen.), (penalty missed) 72', 81'; Ogbene 89'	Report	Lee 5'; Jackson (yellow card) 38' (yellow-red card) 71'	Stadium: AESSEAL New York Stadium; Attendance: 8,008; Referee: Ross Joyce

11 December 2021 22	Fleetwood Town	2–1	Gillingham	Rotherham
15:00 GMT	Biggins 38', (yellow card) 90+7'; Clarke 65'	Report	Phillips (yellow card) 65'; McKenzie 74'; Tutonda (yellow card) 90'	Stadium: Highbury; Attendance: 2,313; Referee: Steve Martin

1 January 2022 23	Milton Keynes Dons	0–0	Gillingham	Denbigh
15:00 GMT	Harvie (yellow card) 24'	Report	McKenzie (yellow card) 16'; Carayol (yellow card) 45'; Ehmer (yellow card) 61'; Phillips (yellow card) 87'	Stadium: Stadium MK; Attendance: 7,891; Referee: Charles Breakspear

8 January 2022 24	Gillingham	0–4	Ipswich Town	Gillingham
15:00 GMT	O'Keefe (yellow card) 63'; Phillips (yellow card) 69' (yellow-red card) 73'	Report	Norwood 9'; Donacien (yellow card) 11'; Burns 13'; Bonne 23'; Chaplin 85' (pen.)	Stadium: Priestfield; Attendance: 6,401; Referee: Alan Young

15 January 2022 25	Gillingham	1–3	Burton Albion	Gillingham
15:00 GMT	McKenzie 3'; Tucker (yellow card) 25'; Dempsey (yellow card) 84'	Report	Hamer (yellow card) 16', (goal) 50'; Brayford 79'; Smith 87'	Stadium: Priestfield; Attendance: 4,198; Referee: Thomas Bramall

22 January 2022 26	Wigan Athletic	3–2	Gillingham	Wigan
15:00 GMT	Keane 8', 77'; Humphrys 21'; Darikwa (yellow card) 90'	Report	McKenzie (yellow card) 31'; Reeves 53'; O'Keefe 70'	Stadium: DW Stadium; Attendance: 9,359; Referee: Carl Boyeson

25 January 2022 27	Gillingham	0–0	Shrewsbury Town	Gillingham
19:45 GMT	Lee (yellow card) 27'; Ehmer (yellow card) 29'; Phillips (yellow card) 78'	Report	Leahy (yellow card) 90+1'	Stadium: Priestfield; Attendance: 3,213; Referee: Brett Huxtable

29 January 2022 28	Gillingham	2–7	Oxford United	Gillingham
15:00 GMT	Lee (yellow card) 11'; Carayol (yellow card) 18'; Dahlberg (yellow card) 47'; Lloyd 62'; McKenzie 85'	Report	Bodin 8'; Brannagan 12' (pen.), 48' (pen.), 55' (pen.), 83' (pen.); Taylor 19'; Forde 89'	Stadium: Priestfield; Attendance: 4,985; Referee: Bobby Madley

1 February 2022 29	Gillingham	1–0	Crewe Alexandra	Gillingham
19:45 GMT	Lloyd 16' (pen.); Tutonda (yellow card) 65'; McKenzie (yellow card) 90+7'	Report		Stadium: Priestfield; Attendance: 4,917; Referee: Darren Drysdale

5 February 2022 30	Ipswich Town	1–0	Gillingham	Ipswich
15:00 GMT	Chaplin 74'	Report	Tutonda (yellow card) 11'	Stadium: Portman Road; Attendance: 20,698; Referee: Stephen Martin

8 February 2022 31	Gillingham	1–0	Cambridge United	Gillingham
19:45 GMT	Tutonda (yellow card) 58'; Thompson (yellow card) 67'; Oliver 86'	Report		Stadium: Priestfield; Attendance: 3,824; Referee: James Bell

12 February 2022 32	Morecambe	1–1	Gillingham	Morecambe
15:00 GMT	Obika 84'	Report	Tutonda (yellow card) 45+1'; Jackson 72'; Kelman (yellow card) 90+4'	Stadium: Mazuma Stadium; Attendance: 4,499; Referee: Peter Wright

19 February 2022 33	Gillingham	0–2	Plymouth Argyle	Gillingham
15:00 GMT	Lee (yellow card) 61'	Report	Wilson (yellow card) 30'; Garrick 46'; Jephcott 76' (pen.)	Stadium: Priestfield; Attendance: 5,197; Referee: Paul Howard

22 February 2022 34	Gillingham	0–0	AFC Wimbledon	Gillingham
19:45 GMT	Tucker (yellow card) 74'; Lee (yellow card) 83'	Report	Mebude (yellow card) 90+4'	Stadium: Priestfield; Attendance: 4,151; Referee: Chris Sarginson

26 February 2022 35	Lincoln City	0–2	Gillingham	Lincoln
15:00 GMT	Bishop (yellow card) 43'; Walsh (yellow card) 90+4'	Report	Lee (yellow card) 11'; Jackson (yellow card) 74'; Oliver 75'; Masterson (yellow card) 85'; Reeves (yellow card) 86'; Thompson 90+1'	Stadium: LNER Stadium; Attendance: 8,208; Referee: Ross Joyce

5 March 2022 36	Gillingham	0–3	Bolton Wanderers	Gillingham
15:00 GMT	Phillips (yellow card) 57' (yellow-red card) 61'	Report	Morley 31'; John 65'; Williams (yellow card) 73'; Böðvarsson 86'	Stadium: MEMS Priestfield Stadium; Attendance: 5,109; Referee: Craig Hicks

12 March 2022 37	Doncaster Rovers	0–1	Gillingham	Doncaster
15:00 GMT	Galbraith (yellow card) 90+7'	Report	Kelman 1'	Stadium: Eco-Power Stadium; Attendance: 6,920; Referee: Anthony Backhouse

15 March 2022 38	Charlton Athletic	1–0	Gillingham	Charlton
19:45 GMT	Gilbey (yellow card) 32', (goal) 40'; Stockley (yellow card) 82'	Report	O'Keefe (yellow card) 86'	Stadium: The Valley; Attendance: 9,728; Referee: Will Finnie

19 March 2022 39	Gillingham	0–0	Sheffield Wednesday	Gillingham
15:00 GMT	Jackson (yellow card) 57'; Masterson (yellow card) 77'; Kelman (yellow card) 90+4'	Report	Dunkley (yellow card) 14'; Bannan (yellow card) 83'; Hutchinson (yellow card) 87'	Stadium: Priestfield Stadium; Attendance: 7,433; Referee: Gavin Ward

26 March 2022 40	Accrington Stanley	1–2	Gillingham	Accrington
15:00 GMT	Adedoyin (yellow card) 62'; Sykes (yellow card) 66'; Bishop 90+1' (pen.)	Report	Kelman 64'; Oliver 73'; Thompson (yellow card) 81'	Stadium: Wham Stadium; Attendance: 2,764; Referee: Scott Oldham

2 April 2022 41	Sunderland	1–0	Gillingham	Sunderland
15:00 BST	Cirkin (yellow card) 45+3'; Broadhead 90+5', (yellow card) 90+6'	Report	Lee (yellow card) 38'; Tutonda (yellow card) 40'; Josh (yellow card) 41'; Reeves (yellow card) 78'	Stadium: Stadium of Light; Attendance: 31,619; Referee: Oliver Langford

9 April 2022 42	Gillingham	1–1	Wycombe Wanderers	Gillingham
15:00 BST	Kelman (yellow card) 64'; Tucker 75'; Oliver (yellow card) 78'	Report	Vokes 20'; Scowen (yellow card) 27'; Wing (red card) 86'	Stadium: MEMS Priestfield Stadium; Attendance: 4,858; Referee: Simon Mather

15 April 2022 43	Cheltenham Town	2–2	Gillingham	Cheltenham
15:00 BST	Wright 40'; Hutchinson (yellow card) 57'; Etete 78'; Long (yellow card) 85'	Report	Oliver 14', (yellow card) 88'; Reeves 59'	Stadium: The Jonny Rocks Stadium; Attendance: 4,415; Referee: David Rock

18 April 2022 44	Gillingham	0–0	Fleetwood Town	Gillingham
15:00 BST	Lee (yellow card) 7'; Ehmer (yellow card) 17'; Kelman (red card) 79'; Tucker (yellow card) 90+6'	Report	Lane (red card) 78'	Stadium: Priestfield Stadium; Attendance: 8,436; Referee: James Linington

23 April 2022 45	Portsmouth	3–1	Gillingham	Milton
15:00 BST	Curtis 4', 45+2'; Robertson 54'	Report	Tutonda (yellow card) 22'; Jackson 30'; Ehmer (yellow card) 90+3'	Stadium: Fratton Park; Attendance: 15,540; Referee: Darren Drysdale

30 April 2022 46	Gillingham	0–2	Rotherham United	Gillingham
12:30 BST	O'Keefe (yellow card) 17'; Tutonda (yellow card) 21'; Thompson (yellow card) 71'	Report	Edmonds-Green 34'; Wood (yellow card) 55'; Harding (yellow card) 83'; Kelly 89', (yellow card) 90'	Stadium: MEMS Priestfield Stadium; Attendance: 8,542; Referee: Sam Barrott

=== FA Cup ===
Gillingham were drawn at home to Cheltenham Town in the first round.

6 November 2021 First round	Gillingham	1–1	Cheltenham Town	Gillingham
14:00 GMT	Jackson (yellow card) 36'; Sithole 59'; Tucker (yellow card) 90'	Report	Pollock 34'; Chapman (yellow card) 54'; Long (yellow card) 84'	Stadium: Priestfield; Referee: Ollie Yates

16 November 2021 First round replay	Cheltenham Town	1–0	Gillingham	Cheltenham
19:45 GMT	Pollock 11'; Joseph (yellow card) 87'	Report	Tucker (yellow card) 54'; O'Keefe (yellow card) 80'; Ehmer (yellow card) 81'	Stadium: Jonny-Rocks Stadium; Attendance: 2,651; Referee: Lee Swabey

=== EFL Cup ===
Gills were drawn at away to Crawley Town in the first round and at home to Cheltenham Town in the second round.

10 August 2021 First round	Crawley Town	2–2 (9–10 p)	Gillingham	Crawley
19:30 BST	Ashford 55'; Francillette (yellow card) 74'; Davies 90+7'		Sithole 3'; Ehmer (yellow card) 36'; Phillips 90+5'	Stadium: The People's Pension Stadium; Attendance: 1,904
	Penalties
	Francomb (penalty scored); Dallison (penalty scored); Craig (penalty scored); Powell (penalty scored); Nadesan (penalty scored); Hessenthaler (penalty scored); Tilley (penalty scored); Ferry (penalty scored); Davies (penalty scored); Francillette (penalty missed)		Lee (penalty scored); Oliver (penalty scored); Lloyd (penalty scored); Phillips (penalty scored); O'Keefe (penalty scored); Tutonda (penalty scored); Maghoma (penalty scored); Sithole (penalty scored); Ehmer (penalty scored); Lintott (penalty scored)

24 August 2021 Second round	Gillingham	1–1 (4–5 p)	Cheltenham Town	Gillingham
19:45 BST	Oliver 20'	Report	May 24'	Stadium: Priestfield Stadium; Referee: David Rock
	Penalties
	Lee (penalty scored); O'Keefe (penalty missed); Lloyd (penalty scored); Carayol (penalty scored); Adshead (penalty scored)		Thomas (penalty scored); Wright (penalty scored); Lloyd (penalty scored); Tozer (penalty scored); Chapman (penalty scored)

=== EFL Trophy ===
The Gills were drawn into Group A of the Southern section, alongside Colchester United, Ipswich Town and West Ham United U21s. On July 7, the fixtures for the group stage round was confirmed.

Pos	Div	Team	Pld	W	PW	PL	L	GF	GA	GD	Pts	Qualification
1	L1	Ipswich Town	3	1	1	0	1	3	2	+1	5	Advance to Round 2
2	L2	Colchester United	3	1	0	1	1	1	1	0	4	Advance to Round 2
3	ACA	West Ham United U21	3	2	0	0	1	4	2	+2	3 (Note: West Ham U21 deducted 3 points for fielding an ineligible player in their match with Gillingham.)	
4	L1	Gillingham	3	1	0	0	2	1	4	−3	3	

Source: EFL.com
Notes:

7 September 2021 Group game 1	Colchester United	0–1	Gillingham	Colchester
19:30 BST	Kennedy (yellow card) 53'	Report	Lintott (yellow card) 38'; O'Keefe (yellow card) 44'; MacDonald (yellow card) 50'; McKenzie 90+3'	Stadium: JobServe Community Stadium; Attendance: 731; Referee: Brett Huxtable

5 October 2021 Group game 2	Gillingham	0–2	Ipswich Town	Gillingham
19:00 BST	McKenzie (yellow card) 58'; Akehurst (yellow card) 66'	Report	Pigott 43'; Harper (yellow card) 57'; Chaplin 72'; El Mizouni (yellow card) 85'	Stadium: Priestfield; Attendance: 1,116; Referee: Trevor Kettle

26 October 2021 Group game 3	Gillingham	0–2	West Ham United U21	Gillingham
19:00 BST	Adshead (yellow card) 61'	Report	Ashby 22', (yellow card) 90+2'; Neves 33'; Swyer (yellow card) 85'	Stadium: Priestfield; Referee: Craig Hicks

== Transfers ==
=== Transfers in ===
Date	Position	Nationality	Name	From	Fee	Ref.
18 June 2021	LB	(Democratic Republic of the Congo)	David Tutonda	(England) Bristol Rovers	Free transfer	
1 July 2021	CB	(Germany)	Max Ehmer	(England) Bristol Rovers	Free transfer	
1 July 2021	CM	(England)	Olly Lee	(Scotland) Heart of Midlothian	Free transfer	
1 July 2021	AM	(Northern Ireland)	Ben Reeves	(England) Plymouth Argyle	Free transfer	
6 July 2021	LW	(England)	Danny Lloyd	(England) Tranmere Rovers	Free transfer	
6 July 2021	GK	(England)	Aaron Chapman	(Scotland) Motherwell	Free transfer	
23 July 2021	CB	(England)	Rhys Bennett	(England) Carlisle United	Free transfer	
9 August 2021	LW	(The Gambia)	Mustapha Carayol	Unattached	Free transfer	
31 January 2022	CM	(England)	Ben Thompson	(England) Millwall	Free transfer	

=== Loans in ===
Date from	Position	Nationality	Name	From	Date until	Ref.
23 July 2021	CM	(Trinidad and Tobago)	Daniel Phillips	(England) Watford	End of season	
26 July 2021	GK	(England)	Jamie Cumming	(England) Chelsea	13 January 2022 (Note: On 13 January, Cumming's was recalled early by his parent club Chelsea, to facilitate a loan move to MK Dons.)	
19 August 2021	CM	(England)	Daniel Adshead	(England) Norwich City	End of season	
31 August 2021	CF	(United States)	Charlie Kelman	(England) Queens Park Rangers	1 January 2022 (Note: On 3 November, Charlie Kelman returned to QPR ahead of an official recall on 1 January 2022.)	
4 January 2022	CF	(Scotland)	Thomas Dickson-Peters	(England) Norwich City	End of season	
14 January 2022	GK	(Sweden)	Pontus Dahlberg	(England) Watford	End of season	
14 January 2022	CF	(United States)	Charlie Kelman	(England) Queens Park Rangers	End of season	
28 January 2022	CB	(Republic of Ireland)	Conor Masterson	(England) Queens Park Rangers	End of season	

=== Loans out ===
Date from	Position	Nationality	Name	To	Date until	Ref.
27 July 2021	CM	(England)	Henry Woods	(England) Dover Athletic	End of the season	
20 August 2021	CB	(Democratic Republic of the Congo)	Christian Maghoma	(England) Eastleigh	31 January 2022	
7 February 2022	GK	(England)	Tommy Crump	(England) Barking		
7 February 2022	MF	(England)	Sam Gale	(England) Lordswood		
7 February 2022	MF	(England)	Joseph Gbode	(England) Margate	March 2022	
7 February 2022	CB	(England)	Alex Giles	(England) Faversham Town		
7 February 2022	MF	(England)	Ethan Smith	(England) Sittingbourne		

=== Transfers out ===
Date	Position	Nationality	Name	To	Fee	Ref.
30 June 2021	GK	(France)	Sacha Bastien	(England) Stevenage	Released	
30 June 2021	GK	(Republic of Ireland)	Jack Bonham	(England) Stoke City	Released	
30 June 2021	LW	(England)	Jordan Graham	(England) Birmingham City	Released	
30 June 2021	LM	(England)	Tyreke Johnson	(England) Woking	Released	
30 June 2021	LB	(England)	Connor Ogilvie	(England) Portsmouth	Released	
30 June 2021	CF	(England)	Dominic Samuel	(Scotland) Ross County	Released	
30 June 2021	CM	(Montserrat)	Matty Willock	(England) Salford City	Released	
27 January 2022	CF	(England)	John Akinde	(England) Colchester United	Free transfer	
28 January 2022	CB	(England)	Rhys Bennett	(England) Morecambe	Free transfer	
31 January 2022	CM	(England)	Kyle Dempsey	(England) Bolton Wanderers	Undisclosed (Note: The transfer was reported to be around £150,000 by The Bolton News)	
