= Gerald Sithole =

English footballer

Personal information
- Full name: Gerald Albert Sithole
- Date of birth: 28 December 2002 (age 23)
- Place of birth: Ashford, Kent, England
- Height: 5 ft 11 in (1.80 m)
- Positions: Winger; striker

Team information
- Current team: FC United of Manchester

Youth career
- –2021: Gillingham

Senior career*
Years	Team	Apps	(Gls)
2021–2022	Gillingham	16	(0)
2022–2024	Bolton Wanderers	0	(0)
2023	→ Altrincham (loan)	4	(0)
2024	→ Chorley (loan)	3	(0)
2024	Warrington Town	10	(0)
2024	FC United of Manchester		
- * Club domestic league appearances and goals as of 12:30, 23 April 2024 (UTC)

Gerald Albert Sithole (born 28 December 2002) is an English professional footballer who plays as a winger or striker for FC United of Manchester.

== Career ==
Having come through Gillingham's youth set-up, he signed his first professional contract with the club on 17 April 2021, hours before being named on the first-team bench for their match against Oxford United. He made his league debut for the club on 24 April 2021 as an 88th-minute substitute in a 2–2 draw with Northampton Town. He made his first appearance of the 2021–22 season on 7 August 2021 in a 1–1 draw with Lincoln City, before scoring the first goal of his career three days later with the opening goal of a 2–2 draw with Crawley Town in the EFL Cup. Following the club's relegation to League Two, Sithole was released by the club at the end of the 2021–22 season.

On 24 June 2022 it was announced that he had signed for League One side Bolton Wanderers, and would feature initially for its B team. He missed eight months of the 2022–23 due to a knee injury.

On 21 September 2023, Sithole joined National League club Altrincham on an initial one-month loan. In March 2024, he joined Chorley on loan for the remainder of the season. On 22 May, the club confirmed that he would be leaving at the end of his contract on 30 June.

On 8 August 2024, Warrington Town announced Sithole had signed for the club after impressing during their pre-season programme.

In October 2024 Sithole signed for FC United of Manchester.

== Style of play ==
Sithole can play as a winger or as a striker.

== Career statistics ==
As of match played 13 April 2024

Appearances and goals by club, season and competition
Club	Season	League			FA Cup		EFL Cup		Other		Total	
Club	Season	Division	Apps	Goals	Apps	Goals	Apps	Goals	Apps	Goals	Apps	Goals
Gillingham	2020–21	EFL League One	1	0	0	0	0	0	0	0	1	0
Gillingham	2021–22	EFL League One	15	0	2	1	1	1	3 (Note: Appearance(s) in EFL Trophy)	0	21	2
Gillingham	Total		16	0	2	1	1	1	3	0	22	2
Bolton Wanderers	2022–23	EFL League One	0	0	0	0	0	0	0	0	0	0
Bolton Wanderers	2023–24	EFL League One	0	0	0	0	0	0	0	0	0	0
Bolton Wanderers	Total		0	0	0	0	0	0	0	0	0	0
Altrincham (loan)	2023–24	National League	4	0	0	0	—		0	0	4	0
Chorley (loan)	2023–24	National League North	3	0	0	0	—		0	0	3	0
Career total			23	0	2	1	1	1	3	0	29	2
