= Harvey Lintott =

English footballer

Personal information
- Full name: Harvey Daniel Lintott
- Date of birth: 20 February 2003 (age 23)
- Height: 6 ft 2 in (1.89 m)
- Positions: Right-back; right wing-back

Team information
- Current team: Tonbridge Angels

Youth career
- –2021: Gillingham

Senior career*
Years	Team	Apps	(Gls)
2021–2022	Gillingham	6	(0)
2022–2025	Northampton Town	48	(1)
2025	→ Sligo Rovers (loan)	12	(0)
2025–2026	Eastbourne Borough	35	(0)
2026–	Tonbridge Angels	0	(0)
- * Club domestic league appearances and goals as of 23:35, 25 April 2026 (UTC)

Harvey Daniel Lintott (born 20 February 2003) is an English professional footballer who plays as a right-back or right wing-back for National League South club Tonbridge Angels.

== Career ==
=== Gillingham ===
After playing youth football with the club, Lintott signed a professional contract with Gillingham in April 2021. He made his debut for the club on 10 August 2021 in a 2–2 EFL Cup draw with Crawley Town and scored the winning penalty of a 10–9 shoot-out victory. Lintott was released at the end of the 2021–22 season following the club's relegation.

=== Northampton Town ===
On 11 July 2022, Lintott joined EFL League Two club Northampton Town on an initial one-year deal with the option for a further year following a successful trial period. On 3 April 2023 the club announced that Lintott had signed a new two-year contract.

==== Sligo Rovers loan ====
On 20 January 2025, Lintott signed for League of Ireland Premier Division club Sligo Rovers on loan until June. On 6 May 2025, Northampton announced the player would leave in June when his contract expired. On 30 June 2025, Sligo announced that Linton had departed the club following the end of his loan spell in which he made 12 appearances for the club.

=== Eastbourne Borough ===
On 4 July 2025, Lintott signed for National League South club Eastbourne Borough.

=== Tonbridge Angels ===
On 10 June 2026, Lintott departed Eastbourne and joined fellow National League South club Tonbridge Angels.

== Career statistics ==
As of match played on 25 April 2026

Appearances and goals by club, season and competition
Club	Season	League			National Cup		League Cup		Other		Total	
Club	Season	Division	Apps	Goals	Apps	Goals	Apps	Goals	Apps	Goals	Apps	Goals
Gillingham	2021–22	League One	6	0	2	0	1	0	2 (Note: Appearance(s) in EFL Trophy)	0	11	0
Northampton Town	2022–23	League Two	33	1	1	0	1	0	3	0	38	1
Northampton Town	2023–24	League One	14	0	0	0	0	0	3	0	17	0
Northampton Town	2024–25	League One	1	0	0	0	0	0	1	0	2	0
Northampton Town	Total		48	1	1	0	1	0	7	0	57	1
Sligo Rovers (loan)	2025	LOI Premier Division	12	0	–		–		–		12	0
Eastbourne Borough	2025–26	National League South	35	0	2	0	–		2 (Note: One appearance in FA Trophy, one appearance in Sussex Senior Cup)	0	39	0
Career total			101	1	5	0	2	0	11	0	119	1

== Honours ==
Northampton Town

- EFL League Two promotion: 2022–23
