= Khayon Edwards =

English footballer (born 2003)

Personal information
- Date of birth: 12 September 2003 (age 23)
- Place of birth: Islington, England
- Height: 1.80 m (5 ft 11 in)
- Position: Striker

Team information
- Current team: Anagennisi Karditsa
- Number: 47

Youth career
- 2008–2023: Arsenal

Senior career*
Years	Team	Apps	(Gls)
2023–2025	Arsenal	0	(0)
2024	→ Leyton Orient (loan)	7	(0)
2025–2026	Estoril	2	(0)
2026–	Anagennisi Karditsa	0	(0)
- * Club domestic league appearances and goals as of 25 May 2026

Khayon Edwards (born 12 September 2003) is an English professional footballer who plays as a striker for Super League Greece 2 club Anagennisi Karditsa.

== Career ==
=== Arsenal ===
Born in Islington, Edwards began his career at Arsenal, joining at the age of 5, and playing for their various youth teams. After being linked with a transfer to Chelsea in April 2022, he turned professional in May 2022, training with the first team later that year.

He moved on loan to Leyton Orient in February 2024.

He was released by Arsenal at the end of the 2024–25 season.

=== Estoril ===
On 4 July 2025, Edwards joined Primeira Liga club Estoril on a three-year deal.

=== Anagennisi Karditsa ===
On 30 September 2026, Edwards signed for Super League Greece 2 club Anagennisi Karditsa on a free transfer.

== Personal life ==
Born in England, Edwards is of Jamaican descent.
