= Peter Abimbola =

English footballer (born 2004)

Personal information
- Date of birth: 22 February 2004 (age 22)
- Place of birth: Northampton, England
- Position: Midfielder

Team information
- Current team: Bedford Town

Youth career
- Northampton Town

Senior career*
Years	Team	Apps	(Gls)
2021–2024	Northampton Town	3	(0)
2022	→ AFC Rushden & Diamonds (loan)	3	(1)
2023	→ Aldershot Town (loan)	1	(0)
2023	→ St Ives Town (loan)	3	(0)
2024	→ Bromsgrove Sporting (loan)	10	(1)
2024–2025	St Ives Town	39	(0)
2025–2026	Banbury United	36	(0)
2026–	Bedford Town	0	(0)
- * Club domestic league appearances and goals as of 19:05, 2 June 2026 (UTC)

Peter Abimbola (born 22 February 2004) is an English professional footballer who plays as a midfielder for National League North club Bedford Town.

== Career ==
Born in Northampton, Abimbola made his first-team debut for Northampton Town on 2 November 2021, in a 2–1 defeat to Brighton & Hove Albion U21 in an EFL Trophy match at Sixfields Stadium. He made his EFL League Two debut on 19 March 2022, in a 1–0 home defeat to Bristol Rovers. He signed his first professional contract in June 2022. On 12 November 2022, he joined Southern League Premier Division Central side AFC Rushden & Diamonds on a one-month loan.

On 13 January 2023, Abimbola joined National League side Aldershot Town on a one-month loan deal.

In October 2023, Abimbola joined St Ives Town on an initial one-month loan deal. In February 2024, he joined Bromsgrove Sporting on another one-month loan deal. He was released by Northampton at the end of the 2023–24 season.

Abimbola left Northampton Town on 30 June 2024 and subsequently joined St Ives Town. In June 2025, he joined Banbury United. In June 2026, he joined National League North club Bedford Town.

== Career statistics ==
As of end of 2025–26 season

Appearances and goals by club, season and competition
Club	Season	League			FA Cup		EFL Cup		Other		Total	
Club	Season	Division	Apps	Goals	Apps	Goals	Apps	Goals	Apps	Goals	Apps	Goals
Northampton Town	2021–22	League Two	1	0	0	0	0	0	1 (Note: Appearances in the EFL Trophy)	0	2	0
Northampton Town	2022–23	League Two	1	0	1	0	0	0	3	0	5	0
Northampton Town	2023–24	League One	1	0	0	0	1	0	2	0	4	0
Northampton Town	Total		3	0	1	0	1	0	6	0	11	0
AFC Rushden & Diamonds (loan)	2022–23	Southern League Premier Central	3	1	0	0	0	0	0	0	3	1
Aldershot Town (loan)	2022–23	National League	1	0	0	0	—		2 (Note: Appearance(s) in FA Trophy)	0	3	0
St Ives Town (loan)	2023–24	Southern League Premier Central	3	0	0	0	—		2	0	5	0
Bromsgrove Sporting (loan)	2023–24	Southern League Premier Central	10	1	0	0	—		0	0	10	1
St Ives Town	2024–25	Southern League Premier Central	39	0	2	2	—		2 (Note: Appearance(s) in Huntingdonshire Senior Cup)	0	43	2
Banbury United	2025–26	Southern League Premier Central	36	0	5	0	—		2	0	43	0
Career total			95	2	8	2	1	0	14	0	118	4
