= Tyreece Simpson =

Kittitian footballer (born 2002)

Personal information
- Full name: Tyreece Tyson Nesbett Simpson
- Date of birth: 7 February 2002 (age 24)
- Place of birth: Ipswich, England
- Height: 1.86 m (6 ft 1 in)
- Position: Striker

Team information
- Current team: Southend United (on loan from Port Vale)
- Number: 45

Youth career
- 2018–2019: Ipswich Town

Senior career*
Years	Team	Apps	(Gls)
2019–2022	Ipswich Town	4	(0)
2021–2022	→ Swindon Town (loan)	25	(9)
2022–2024	Huddersfield Town	9	(0)
2023–2024	→ Northampton Town (loan)	40	(3)
2024–2026	Stevenage	19	(0)
2025	→ Colchester United (loan)	20	(2)
2026–	Port Vale	4	(0)
2026–	→ Southend United (loan)	4	(3)

International career^{‡}
2025–	Saint Kitts and Nevis	6	(2)
- * Club domestic league appearances and goals as of 10:07, 22 November 2026 (UTC) ‡ National team caps and goals as of 21:47, 5 October 2026 (UTC)

Tyreece Tyson Nesbett Simpson (born 7 February 2002) is a professional footballer who plays as a striker for National League club Southend United, on loan from EFL League Two club Port Vale. Born in England, he represents the Saint Kitts and Nevis national team.

Simpson turned down a professional contract by rugby union club Leicester Tigers and instead joined the football academy at Ipswich Town, eventually turning professional in March 2020. He spent the first half of the 2021–22 season on loan at Swindon Town, scoring 11 goals in 30 games. He was sold to Huddersfield Town for £500,000 in September 2022 and made nine Championship appearances for the club. He spent the 2023–24 season on loan at Northampton Town, scoring six goals in 44 games. He was sold to Stevenage in July 2024 and spent the second half of the 2024–25 campaign on loan at Colchester United. He was released after an Achilles tendon rupture ruled him out for the entirety of the 2025–26 season. He joined Port Vale in August 2026, from where he was loaned out to Southend United two months later.

== Early life ==
Tyreece Tyson Nesbett Simpson was born in Ipswich on 7 February 2002. He grew up in Gorleston-on-Sea and supported Manchester City. He had a trial with Manchester City. He represented Langley School at rugby, and Great Yarmouth and District Athletics Club in athletics. He was offered a professional contract by rugby union club Leicester Tigers in March 2018, but turned the offer down so that he could pursue a career in football.

== Club career ==
=== Ipswich Town ===
Simpson joined the academy at Ipswich Town late in the 2017–18 season, signing a two-year scholarship. He made his senior debut for the club on 3 September 2019, featuring as a second-half substitute in a 2–1 win over Tottenham Hotspur U23s in an EFL Trophy group stage match at Portman Road. Assistant manager Stuart Taylor praised him, saying "I thought he did excellently, he was full of energy, showed his presence, held the ball up well and he was a threat". Manager Paul Lambert said he was "one for the future" who needed time to develop. He made his league debut in a 2–1 defeat at Blackpool on 29 February 2020. He signed his first two-year professional contract with the club in March 2020, with the option of an extra year. He played four League One games and three EFL Trophy matches for the Tractor Boys.

On 31 July 2021, Simpson joined League Two club Swindon Town on a season-long loan deal, having impressed Ben Garner in a pre-season friendly. He scored his first career goal to give Swindon a 1–0 victory over Mansfield Town at the County Ground on 28 August. He formed a dangerous strike partnership with Harry McKirdy. On 23 January 2022, Simpson was recalled from his season-long loan deal after scoring 11 goals in 30 matches for the Robins. The reason given for the recall was a contract dispute, with Cardiff City, Hull City, and Barnsley all expressing an interest in his services. He spoke out three months later to tell Ipswich manager Kieran McKenna that he wanted to leave the club and began training away from Portman Road. McKenna said that whilst it was "not impossible" he'd get gametime at Ipswich, the club were looking to sign him to a longer deal and get him out on loan again. Simpson later spoke of his regret at not signing a new contract with the Blues. The club retained the option to extend his existing contract until summer 2023. West Bromwich Albion made a late enquiry after a sale had already been agreed.

=== Huddersfield Town ===
On 1 September 2022, Simpson signed a four-year deal with Championship club Huddersfield Town after transferring for an undisclosed fee, with Head of Football Operations Leigh Bromby commenting that "we want to give Danny (manager Danny Schofield) as many different options as we can". The fee was later reported as an initial £500,000 plus top-ups. He was seen as a long-term development prospect, and also arrived at the club whilst injured, which saw him sidelined for three months. He made his debut for the Terriers under new head coach Mark Fotheringham in December, and played ten games during the 2022–23 campaign, only one of which was a start, in the FA Cup. He subsequently found himself out of new manager Neil Warnock's first-team plans at the John Smith's Stadium.

On 26 July 2023, Simpson joined League One club Northampton Town on a season-long loan deal after being a "long time target" of manager Jon Brady. He struggled for confidence after undergoing a league goal drought at Sixfields, though he had scored two goals in the EFL Trophy. He ended the 2023–24 campaign with six goals in 44 appearances for the Cobblers.

=== Stevenage ===
On 26 July 2024, Simpson joined League One club Stevenage for a "significant" undisclosed fee. Manager Alex Revell said he suited the style of play the club wanted to adopt. He started ten games for Boro, with a further 15 appearances off the bench, scoring two goals. On 20 January 2025, Simpson joined League Two club Colchester United on loan for the remainder of the 2024–25 season, where manager Danny Cowley praised his mentality, as well as his physicality, power and pace. He scored two goals in 20 appearances for the U's, helping the Colchester Community Stadium team to go from 15th to within three points of the play-offs.

Stevenage reportedly turned down a transfer bid for him in June 2025. He suffered an Achilles tendon rupture not long afterwards, which saw him ruled out of action for a lengthy period. He left Broadhall Way after being released at the end of the 2025–26 season, having not played at all due to the injury.

=== Port Vale ===
Following a successful trial, Simpson signed a one-year deal with League Two club Port Vale on 4 August 2026. He played four games for the Valiants before joining National League club Southend United on loan until 10 January. Head coach Kieron Dyer said he would bring "a lot of pace and power" to the Shrimpers. He scored on his debut later that day to secure a 3–3 draw at Worthing.

== International career ==
Simpson was called up to the Saint Kitts and Nevis team for the first time for their 2026 FIFA World Cup qualifiers against Trinidad and Tobago and Grenada in June 2025. Saint Kitts were beaten 6–2 by Trinidad and Tobago and 3–2 by Grenada, with Simpson scoring in the game against Grenada.

== Style of play ==
Simpson is a pacey striker who posted a personal best sprint time of 11.2s in 100 metres. He is noted for his power and pace.

== Career statistics ==
=== Club statistics ===
As of match played 20 November 2026

Appearances and goals by club, season and competition
Club	Season	Division	League		FA Cup		EFL Cup		Other		Total	
Club	Season	Division	Apps	Goals	Apps	Goals	Apps	Goals	Apps	Goals	Apps	Goals
Ipswich Town	2019–20	League One	3	0	0	0	0	0	1 (Note: Appearance(s) in EFL Trophy)	0	4	0
Ipswich Town	2020–21	League One	1	0	0	0	0	0	2	0	3	0
Ipswich Town	2021–22	League One	0	0	0	0	0	0	0	0	0	0
Ipswich Town	Total		4	0	0	0	0	0	3	0	7	0
Swindon Town (loan)	2021–22	League Two	25	9	3	2	1	0	1	0	30	11
Huddersfield Town	2022–23	Championship	9	0	1	0	—		—		10	0
Huddersfield Town	2023–24	Championship	0	0	0	0	0	0	—		0	0
Huddersfield Town	Total		9	0	1	0	0	0	0	0	10	0
Northampton Town (loan)	2023–24	League One	40	3	1	0	0	0	3	3	44	6
Stevenage	2024–25	League One	19	0	1	0	1	0	4	2	25	2
Stevenage	2025–26	League One	0	0	0	0	0	0	0	0	0	0
Stevenage	Total		19	0	1	0	1	0	4	2	25	2
Colchester United (loan)	2024–25	League Two	20	2	—		—		0	0	20	2
Port Vale	2026–27	League Two	4	0	0	0	0	0	0	0	4	0
Southend United (loan)	2026–27	National League	4	3	—		—		0	0	4	3
Career total			125	17	6	2	2	0	11	5	144	24

=== International statistics ===
As of match played 5 October 2026

Appearances and goals by national team and year
National team	Year	Apps	Goals
Saint Kitts and Nevis	2025	2	1
Saint Kitts and Nevis	2026	4	1
Total		6	2

=== International goals ===
Scores and results list Saint Kitts and Nevis' goal tally first, score column indicates score after each Simpson goal.

List of international goals scored by Tyreece Simpson
No.	Date	Venue	Opponent	Score	Result	Competition
1	10 June 2025	Warner Park Sporting Complex, Basseterre, Saint Kitts and Nevis	Grenada	1–0	2–3	2026 FIFA World Cup qualification
2	2 October 2026	Hasely Crawford Stadium, Port of Spain, Trinidad and Tobago	Cuba	2–3	3–3	2026–27 CONCACAF Nations League B
