= 2021–22 Northampton Town F.C. season =

Northampton Town
2021–22 season
- Chairman: Kelvin Thomas
- Manager: Jon Brady
- Stadium: Sixfields Stadium
- League Two: 4th
- Play-offs: Semi-final
- FA Cup: First round
- EFL Cup: Second round
- EFL Trophy: Group stage
- Top goalscorer: League: Sam Hoskins (13); All: Sam Hoskins (13)
- Highest home attendance: 7,764 vs Exeter City
- Lowest home attendance: 1,014 vs Brighton & Hove Albion U21
- Average home league attendance: 5,366
Home colours	Away colours

The 2021–22 season was Northampton Town's 125th season in their history and the first season back in League Two after relegation the previous year. Alongside competing in League Two, the club also participated in the FA Cup, EFL Cup and EFL Trophy. The season covered the period from 1 July 2021 to 30 June 2022.

== Players ==
As of match played 18 May 2022.

No.	Name	Position	Nat.	Place of Birth	Date of Birth (Age)	Apps	Goals	Previous club	Date signed	Fee
Goalkeepers
1	Liam Roberts	GK	(England)	Walsall	24 November 1994 (aged 27)	49	0	Walsall	22 June 2021	Undisclosed
26	Jonny Maxted	GK	(England)	Tadcaster	26 October 1993 (aged 28)	5	0	Exeter City	24 June 2021	Free
Defenders
2	Michael Harriman	RB	(Republic of Ireland)	Chichester (ENG)	23 October 1992 (aged 29)	75	1	Wycombe Wanderers	4 September 2019	Free
3	Aaron McGowan	RB	(England)	Liverpool	24 July 1996 (aged 25)	44	2	Kilmarnock	12 July 2021	Undisclosed
5	Jon Guthrie	CB	(England)	Devizes	29 July 1992 (aged 29)	50	8	Livingston	24 June 2021	Free
6	Fraser Horsfall (vc)	CB	(England)	Huddersfield	12 November 1996 (aged 25)	100	12	Macclesfield Town	14 August 2020	Free
14	Ali Koiki	LB	(England)	Kensington	22 August 1999 (aged 22)	50	1	Bristol Rovers	23 July 2021	Free
15	Sid Nelson	CB	(England)	Lewisham	1 January 1996 (aged 26)	4	0	Tranmere Rovers	9 July 2021	Free
23	Joseph Mills (c)	LB	(England)	Swindon	30 October 1989 (aged 32)	51	2	Forest Green Rovers	8 August 2020	Free
29	Josh Flanagan	CB	(England)	Milton Keynes	30 June 2003 (aged 18)	1	0	Academy	1 August 2021	N/A
35	Max Dyche	CB	(England)	Northampton	23 February 2003 (aged 19)	4	0	Academy	12 December 2020	N/A
–	Ryan Nolan	CB	(Republic of Ireland)	Shannon	17 February 1999 (aged 23)	0	0	Getafe	28 February 2022	Free
Midfielders
4	Jack Sowerby	CM	(England)	Preston	23 March 1995 (aged 27)	69	1	Fleetwood Town	18 September 2020	Undisclosed
7	Sam Hoskins	W	(England)	Dorchester	4 February 1993 (aged 29)	296	53	Yeovil Town	1 August 2015	Free
8	Paul Lewis	CM	(England)	Liverpool	17 December 1994 (aged 27)	43	7	Tranmere Rovers	10 June 2021	Free
10	Bez Lubala	W	(Democratic Republic of the Congo)	Kinshasa	8 January 1998 (aged 24)	14	0	Blackpool	31 January 2022	Loan
11	Mitch Pinnock	W	(England)	Gravesend	12 December 1994 (aged 27)	53	9	Kilmarnock	8 June 2021	Free
12	Scott Pollock	CM	(England)	Northampton	22 January 2001 (aged 21)	29	2	Football & Education Programme	26 March 2019	N/A
17	Shaun McWilliams	CM	(England)	Northampton	14 August 1998 (aged 23)	157	1	Academy	30 April 2016	N/A
19	Idris Kanu	AM	(Sierra Leone)	London (ENG)	5 December 1999 (aged 22)	7	0	Peterborough United	26 January 2022	Loan
34	Liam Cross	W	(England)	Northampton	8 April 2003 (aged 19)	2	0	Academy	30 October 2019	N/A
Forwards
18	Chanka Zimba	CF	(Zambia)	Lusaka	29 December 2001 (aged 20)	13	1	Cardiff City	6 January 2022	Loan
21	Josh Eppiah	CF	(Belgium)	Brussels	11 October 1998 (aged 23)	16	2	Leicester City	28 January 2022	Loan
22	Benny Ashley-Seal	CF	(England)	Southwark	21 November 1998 (aged 23)	42	5	Wolverhampton Wanderers	7 September 2020	Undisclosed
24	Louis Appéré	CF	(Scotland)	Perth	26 March 1999 (aged 23)	20	3	Dundee United	31 January 2022	Undisclosed
32	Danny Rose	CF	(England)	Barnsley	10 December 1993 (aged 28)	87	7	Mansfield Town	2 October 2020	Undisclosed

== Pre-season ==
The Cobblers announced their first pre-season friendly against Birmingham City, as part of the club's open day. This was soon followed by a match against West Ham United. The club announced a number of local games on May 28. A seventh friendly against Cambridge United was announced on 8 June. Nottingham Forest was then confirmed on 28 June.

10 July 2021 Friendly	Northampton Sileby Rangers	0–6	Northampton Town	Moulton
15:00 BST		Report	L.Cross 1'; N.Kabamba 21', 30'; M.Pinnock 51', 57'; B.Ashley-Seal 69'	Stadium: Fernie Fields; Referee: Andy Woolmer

13 July 2021 Friendly	Northampton Town	1–2	West Ham United	Northampton
19:00 BST	S.Hoskins 29'	Report	S.Nelson 2' (o.g.); C.Coventry 13'	Stadium: Sixfields Stadium; Attendance: 1,715; Referee: Andy Woolmer

17 July 2021 Friendly	Stamford	2–1	Northampton Town	Stamford
12:00 BST	Johnson 16'; Blunden 41'	Report	B.Ashley-Seal 55'	Stadium: Zeeco Stadium; Referee: Carl Henry

20 July 2021 Friendly	Northampton Town	0–2	Nottingham Forest	Northampton
19:45 BST		Report	L.Taylor 48'; Cafú 62'	Stadium: Sixfields Stadium; Attendance: 2,526; Referee: Dean Whitestone

24 July 2021 Friendly	Northampton Town	3–2	Birmingham City	Northampton
15:00 BST	M.Pinnock 9'; N.Kabamba 20'; C.Chukwuemeka 70'	Report	I.Sánchez 2'; L.Jutkiewicz 35'	Stadium: Sixfields Stadium; Attendance: 3,698; Referee: Andy Woolmer

27 July 2021 Friendly	Brackley Town	P–P	Northampton Town	Brackley
19:00 BST				Stadium: St James Park
Note: Match was cancelled and replaced with the rearranged friendly against AFC Rushden & Diamonds.

27 July 2021 Friendly	AFC Rushden & Diamonds	3–1	Northampton Town	Wellingborough
19:45 BST	Diamond 3'; Lorraine 38'; J.Flanagan 72' (o.g.)	Report	J.Mills 88' (pen.)	Stadium: London Road

31 July 2021 Friendly	Cambridge United	0–0	Northampton Town	Cambridge
15:00 BST		Report		Stadium: Abbey Stadium; Attendance: 1,235

== Competitions ==
=== EFL League Two ===
==== League table ====
Pos	Team	Pld	W	D	L	GF	GA	GD	Pts	Promotion, qualification or relegation
1	Forest Green Rovers (C, P)	46	23	15	8	75	44	+31	84	Promotion to EFL League One
2	Exeter City (P)	46	23	15	8	65	41	+24	84	Promotion to EFL League One
3	Bristol Rovers (P)	46	23	11	12	71	49	+22	80	Promotion to EFL League One
4	Northampton Town	46	23	11	12	60	38	+22	80	Qualification for League Two play-offs
5	Port Vale (O, P)	46	22	12	12	67	46	+21	78	Qualification for League Two play-offs
6	Swindon Town	46	22	11	13	77	54	+23	77	Qualification for League Two play-offs
7	Mansfield Town	46	22	11	13	67	52	+15	77	Qualification for League Two play-offs

Source: EFL Official Website
Rules for classification: 1) Points; 2) Goal difference; 3) Number of goals scored; 4) Head-to-head results; 5) Wins; 6) Away goals; 7) Penalty points (sec 9.5); 8) 12-point sending off offences
(C) Champions; (O) Play-off winners; (P) Promoted

==== Results summary ====
Overall								Home						Away					
Pld	W	D	L	GF	GA	GD	Pts	W	D	L	GF	GA	GD	W	D	L	GF	GA	GD
46	23	11	12	60	38	+22	80	13	5	5	31	16	+15	10	6	7	29	22	+7

Last updated: 7 May 2022.

==== League position by match ====
Round	1	2	3	4	5	6	7	8	9	10	11	12	13	14	15	16	17	18	19	20	21	22	23	24	25	26	27	28	29	30	31	32	33	34	35	36	37	38	39	40	41	42	43	44	45	46
Ground	H	A	H	A	H	A	A	H	A	H	A	H	H	A	H	A	A	H	H	A	A	A	H	H	A	H	H	A	H	A	H	A	A	H	H	A	A	H	H	A	H	A	H	A	H	A
Result	W	W	L	D	W	L	W	D	D	L	L	W	W	W	W	L	D	W	W	W	W	L	L	D	D	W	L	W	W	D	W	D	L	D	W	L	W	L	W	L	D	W	W	W	D	W
Position	7	4	10	8	5	9	3	4	5	10	14	8	6	3	3	4	5	4	2	2	2	2	3	3	4	5	5	4	3	3	3	2	2	2	2	2	2	3	3	4	5	4	4	3	3	4

Updated to match(es) played on 7 May 2022. Source:
A = Away; H = Home; W = Win; D = Draw; L = Loss

==== Matches ====
Northampton Town's fixtures were announced on 24 June 2021. Win Draw Loss Postponed

7 August 2021 1	Northampton Town	1–0	Port Vale	Northampton
15:00 BST	B.Ashley-Seal 23'; J.Guthrie (yellow card) 71'; A.McGowan (yellow card) 73'; D.Connolly (yellow card) 77'; D.Rose (yellow card) 79'	Report	R.Johnson (yellow card) 27'; L.Covolan (red card) 55'; A.Martin (yellow card) 81'	Stadium: Sixfields Stadium; Attendance: 5,804 (1,106); Referee: Simon Mather

14 August 2021 2	Colchester United	0–1	Northampton Town	Colchester
15:00 BST		Report	J.Guthrie 22'; M.Pinnock (yellow card) 31'; S.Hoskins (yellow card) 75'; F.Horsfall (red card) 84'; S.McWilliams (yellow card) 90+3'	Stadium: JobServe Community Stadium; Attendance: 2,772 (446); Referee: Trevor Kettle

21 August 2021 3	Northampton Town	1–3	Rochdale	Northampton
15:00 BST	J.Guthrie 21'; S.Nelson (yellow card) 46'; S.Hoskins (yellow card) 66'	Report	M.Taylor 17'; J.Andrews 73'; A.Odoh 90+5'	Stadium: Sixfields Stadium; Attendance: 4,870 (221); Referee: Carl Brook

28 August 2021 4	Crawley Town	0–0	Northampton Town	Crawley
15:00 BST	J.Powell (yellow card) 83'	Report	D.Connolly (yellow card) 90'	Stadium: The People's Pension Stadium; Attendance: 2,254 (415); Referee: Lee Swabey

4 September 2021 5	Northampton Town	2–0	Scunthorpe United	Northampton
15:00 BST	F.Horsfall (yellow card) 44'; D.Rose 64'; S.Hoskins 90+3'	Report	L.Thompson (yellow card) 16'; M.Onariase (red card) 20'; H.Davis (yellow card) 90'	Stadium: Sixfields Stadium; Attendance: 4,870 (331); Referee: Tom Reeves

11 September 2021 6	Forest Green Rovers	1–0	Northampton Town	Nailsworth
15:00 BST	K.Wilson (yellow card) 43'; J.Matt 76'	Report	A.McGowan (yellow card) 21'; P.Lewis (yellow card) 74'	Stadium: The innocent New Lawn Stadium; Attendance: 2,576 (Away not confirmed); Referee: Scott Oldham

14 September 2021 7	Newport County	0–1	Northampton Town	Newport, Wales
19:45 BST	A.Livermore (yellow card) 42'	Report	J.Guthrie 43'; D.Rose (yellow card) 76'; S.McWilliams (yellow card) 76'; J.Flores (yellow card) 90+6'	Stadium: Rodney Parade; Attendance: 3,169 (161); Referee: Craig Hicks

18 September 2021 8	Northampton Town	1–1	Swindon Town	Northampton
14:00 BST	D.Rose (yellow card) 43'; J.Sowerby (yellow card) 44'; S.Hoskins (yellow card) 68'; F.Horsfall 83'; S.McWilliams (yellow card) 84'	Report	D.Conroy (yellow card) 52'; T.Simpson 57'	Stadium: Sixfields Stadium; Attendance: 5,863 (962); Referee: Brett Huxtable

25 September 2021 9	Salford City	2–2	Northampton Town	Salford
15:00 BST	A.Hunter (yellow card) 8'; M.Lund 24'; J.Lowe (yellow card) 90'; A.Eastham 90+3'	Report	P.Lewis 16'; D.Rose (yellow card) 45'; M.Pinnock 77'	Stadium: Moor Lane; Attendance: 2,037 (677); Referee: Anthony Backhouse

2 October 2021 10	Northampton Town	0–2	Sutton United	Northampton
15:00 BST	S.McWilliams (yellow card) 37'; D.Rose (yellow card) 38'; A.Koiki (yellow card) 71'; J.Flores (yellow card) 85'	Report	J.Kizzi 41'; D.Wilson 46'; D.Bouzanis (yellow card) 89'	Stadium: Sixfields Stadium; Attendance: 4,789 (224); Referee: Rebecca Welch

9 October 2021 11	Hartlepool United	2–1	Northampton Town	Hartlepool
15:00 BST	D.Ferguson 53', (yellow card) 56'; L.Molyneux 83'	Report	S.Hoskins 51', (yellow card) 66'; A.McGowan (yellow card) 79'	Stadium: Victoria Park; Attendance: 5,522 (250); Referee: Ben Toner

16 October 2021 12	Northampton Town	2–0	Mansfield Town	Northampton
15:00 BST	A.McGowan 23'; K.Etete (yellow card) 24'; F.Horsfall 74', (yellow card) 75'	Report	H.Charsley (yellow card) 41'	Stadium: Sixfields Stadium; Attendance: 6,034 (1,019); Referee: Robert Lewis

19 October 2021 13	Northampton Town	3–0	Stevenage	Northampton
19:45 BST	K.Etete 34'; S.Hoskins 43'; F.Horsfall 63'; P.Lewis (yellow card) 88'	Report	J.Reeves (yellow card) 12'; T.Vancooten (yellow card) 54'; J.Reid (yellow card) 56'; B.Coker (yellow card) 73'	Stadium: Sixfields Stadium; Attendance: 4,123 (204); Referee: Sam Barrott

23 October 2021 14	Tranmere Rovers	0–2	Northampton Town	Birkenhead
15:00 BST	J.Spearing (yellow card) 72'	Report	P.Lewis (yellow card) 43'; K.Etete 52'; A.Koiki (yellow card) 58'; S.Hoskins 68' (pen.), (yellow card) 86'	Stadium: Prenton Park; Attendance: 6,885 (475); Referee: Tom Nield

30 October 2021 15	Northampton Town	3–0	Carlisle United	Northampton
14:00 BST	P.Lewis 41', 57', 67' (pen.)	Report	C.Guy (yellow card) 82'	Stadium: Sixfields Stadium; Attendance: 4,909 (288); Referee: Ollie Yates

13 November 2021 16	Bristol Rovers	2–1	Northampton Town	Horfield
15:00 GMT	G.Whelan (yellow card) 12' (yellow-red card) 67'; C.Harries (yellow card) 49'; J.Grant 54'; A.Evans 59'; H.Anderson (yellow card) 74'	Report	S.Hoskins 39' (pen.), (yellow card) 74'; L.Roberts (yellow card) 90+5'	Stadium: Memorial Stadium; Attendance: 6,884 (Away not confirmed); Referee: Sam Allison

20 November 2021 17	Bradford City	1–1	Northampton Town	Bradford
15:00 GMT	N.Canavan (yellow card) 63'; C.Vernam 67'; Y.Songo'o (yellow card) 70'; A.Gilliead (yellow card) 88'	Report	M.Pinnock 60'; J.Sowerby (yellow card) 88'	Stadium: Valley Parade; Attendance: 15,372 (426); Referee: Carl Boyeson

23 November 2021 18	Northampton Town	2–1	Oldham Athletic	Northampton
19:45 GMT	J.Guthrie 14'; K.Etete 38'; S.McWilliams (yellow card) 90+5'	Report	C.Piergianni (yellow card) 45+2', (goal) 54'; H.McGahey (yellow card) 90+5'	Stadium: Sixfields Stadium; Attendance: 4,059 (132); Referee: Brett Huxtable

27 November 2021 19	Northampton Town	1–0	Leyton Orient	Northampton
15:00 GMT	S.Hoskins 41'	Report	H.Kyprianou (yellow card) 52'; C.Wood (yellow card) 90'	Stadium: Sixfields Stadium; Attendance: 5,769 (907); Referee: Andrew Kitchen

7 December 2021 20	Exeter City	1–2	Northampton Town	Exeter
19:45 GMT	P.Amond 50'; J.Key (yellow card) 56'; J.Caprice (yellow card) 79'	Report	J.Sowerby 34'; S.McWilliams (yellow card) 35'; J.Guthrie (yellow card) 72'; M.Pinnock 74'	Stadium: St James Park; Attendance: 3,823 (159); Referee: John Busby

11 December 2021 21	Harrogate Town	1–2	Northampton Town	Harrogate
15:00 GMT	J.Diamond 23'; W.Burrell (yellow card) 59'	Report	F.Horsfall 7'; J.Guthrie 49'; A.McGowan (yellow card) 55'; D.Rose (yellow card) 69'; J.Sowerby (yellow card) 83'	Stadium: Wetherby Road; Attendance: 2,166 (574); Referee: Carl Brook

1 January 2022 22	Swindon Town	5–2	Northampton Town	Swindon
15:00 GMT	H.McKirdy 28', 51', 55', 66'; R.Hunt (yellow card) 49'; T.Simpson 60'; K.Kesler Hayden (yellow card) 88'	Report	S.McWilliams (yellow card) 18'; J.Sowerby (yellow card) 34'; S.Hoskins 37'; J.Guthrie 50'; A.Koiki (yellow card) 62'	Stadium: County Ground; Attendance: 9,071 (746); Referee: Sam Allison

8 January 2022 23	Northampton Town	0–1	Crawley Town	Northampton
15:00 GMT	F.Horsfall (yellow card) 90+3'	Report	J.Lynch (yellow card) 9'; T.Nichols 41'; S.Ashford (yellow card) 87'	Stadium: Sixfields Stadium; Attendance: 4,714 (193); Referee: Declan Bourne

15 January 2022 24	Northampton Town	1–1	Forest Green Rovers	Northampton
15:00 GMT	J.Sowerby (yellow card) 45'; P.Lewis (yellow card) 51'; F.Horsfall (yellow card) 64'; M.Pinnock 90+5' (yellow card) 90+6'	Report	M.Stevens 70'; K.Wilson (yellow card) 80'	Stadium: Sixfields Stadium; Attendance: 5,415 (276); Referee: Marc Edwards

22 January 2022 25	Sutton United	0–0	Northampton Town	Sutton, London
15:00 GMT	C.Eastmond (red card) 74'	Report	P.Lewis (yellow card) 56'; F.Horsfall (yellow card) 79'; D.Rose (yellow card) 80'	Stadium: Gander Green Lane; Attendance: 3,588 (500); Referee: John Busby

29 January 2022 26	Northampton Town	1–0	Salford City	Northampton
15:00 GMT	P.Lewis 12'	Report	J.Lowe (yellow card) 35'; C.Ndaba (yellow card) 66'	Stadium: Sixfields Stadium; Attendance: 5,237 (128); Referee: Tom Nield

1 February 2022 27	Northampton Town	0–1	Barrow	Northampton
19:45 GMT	S.McWilliams (yellow card) 71'	Report	R.Hutton (yellow card) 33'; A.Amadi-Holloway 51'; J.Taylor (yellow card) 64'; J.Kay (yellow card) 79'; J.Rooney (yellow card) 90+4'	Stadium: Sixfields Stadium; Attendance: 4,604 (151); Referee: Lee Swabey

5 February 2022 28	Walsall	0–1	Northampton Town	Walsall
15:00 GMT	L.Kinsella (yellow card) 66'; J.Labadie (yellow card) 88'	Report	L.Appéré 10' (yellow card) 65'; S.McWilliams (yellow card) 88'	Stadium: Bescot Stadium; Attendance: 5,315 (1,200); Referee: Seb Stockbridge

8 February 2022 29	Northampton Town	1–0	Newport County	Northampton
19:45 GMT	M.Pinnock (yellow card) 25'; T.Magloire (yellow card) 78'; F.Horsfall 82'	Report	C.Norman (yellow card) 73'	Stadium: Sixfields Stadium; Attendance: 4,255 (228); Referee: Benjamin Speedie

12 February 2022 30	Port Vale	0–0	Northampton Town	Burslem
15:00 GMT	A.Martin (yellow card) 65'	Report	P.Lewis (yellow card) 52'; S.McWilliams (yellow card) 63'; B.Lubala (yellow card) 82'	Stadium: Vale Park; Attendance: 5,979 (587); Referee: Alan Young

19 February 2022 31	Northampton Town	3–0	Colchester United	Northampton
14:00 GMT	F.Horsfall 16'; S.Hoskins 49'; B.Ashley-Seal 90+4'	Report	A.Judge (yellow card) 35'	Stadium: Sixfields Stadium; Attendance: 5,309 (413); Referee: Scott Oldham

22 February 2022 32	Scunthorpe United	0–0	Northampton Town	Scunthorpe
19:45 GMT	A.Grant (yellow card) 59'; J.Nuttall (yellow card) 78'	Report	T.Magloire (yellow card) 45'; J.Guthrie (yellow card) 46'; A.Koiki (yellow card) 62'; S.Hoskins (yellow card) 82'; J.Eppiah (yellow card) 90'	Stadium: Glanford Park; Attendance: 2,355 (Away not confirmed); Referee: Darren Handley

26 February 2022 33	Rochdale	1–0	Northampton Town	Rochdale
15:00 GMT	T.Campbell 53'	Report	J.Mills (yellow card) 78'; B.Lubala (yellow card) 88'	Stadium: Spotland Stadium; Attendance: 2,643 (444); Referee: Ollie Yates

1 March 2022 34	Northampton Town	1–1	Walsall	Northampton
19:45 GMT	M.Pinnock 4'; T.Magloire (yellow card) 48'; J.Mills (yellow card) 62'; P.Lewis (yellow card) 70'	Report	J.Labadie (yellow card) 29'; C.Wilkinson 50'	Stadium: Sixfields Stadium; Attendance: 4,861 (385); Referee: Paul Howard

5 March 2022 35	Northampton Town	3–2	Tranmere Rovers	Northampton
15:00 GMT	F.Horsfall 29', 37', (yellow card) 72'; M.Pinnock 66'; B.Lubala (yellow card) 90+3'	Report	C.McManaman (yellow card) 12'; J.McPake (yellow card) 68', (goal) 75'; K.Hemmings 88' (pen.); L.O'Connor (yellow card) 90+2'	Stadium: Sixfields Stadium; Attendance: 7,379 (707); Referee: Stephen Martin

12 March 2022 36	Carlisle United	2–1	Northampton Town	Carlisle
15:00 GMT	T.Sho-Silva 74'; J.Riley (yellow card) 80'; J.Gibson 90+4' (pen.)	Report	S.McWilliams (yellow card) 30'; F.Horsfall (yellow card) 56'; P.Lewis 79'; M.Pinnock (yellow card) 80'	Stadium: Brunton Park; Attendance: 8,514 (380); Referee: James Bell

15 March 2022 37	Stevenage	1–2	Northampton Town	Stevenage
19:45 GMT	C.Lines 82'	Report	A.McGowan 18'; M.Pinnock 50'; S.Hoskins (yellow card) 68'; D.Rose (yellow card) 78'	Stadium: Broadhall Way; Attendance: 2,362 (568); Referee: Craig Hicks

19 March 2022 38	Northampton Town	0–1	Bristol Rovers	Northampton
15:00 GMT	A.McGowan (yellow card) 61'; P.Lewis (yellow card) 71'; M.Pinnock (yellow card) 90+5'	Report	H.Anderson 1'; S.Finley (yellow card) 68'; P.Coutts (yellow card) 75'; J.Connolly (yellow card) 81'; C.Taylor (yellow card) 90+1'	Stadium: Sixfields Stadium; Attendance: 6,405 (1,388); Referee: Oliver Langford

26 March 2022 39	Northampton Town	2–0	Hartlepool United	Northampton
15:00 GMT	S.Hoskins 6'; J.Mills (yellow card) 29'; C.Zimba 61'	Report	G.Liddle (yellow card) 14'; O.Bogle (yellow card) 82'; N.Featherstone (yellow card) 90+1'	Stadium: Sixfields Stadium; Attendance: 5,673 (320); Referee: Keith Stroud

2 April 2022 40	Mansfield Town	1–0	Northampton Town	Mansfield
15:00 BST	S.McLaughlin (yellow card) 5'; O.Hawkins 21'; E.Hewitt (yellow card) 65'; R.Stirk (yellow card) 85'	Report	P.Lewis (yellow card) 75' (yellow-red card) 75'	Stadium: Field Mill; Attendance: 6,678 (935); Referee: Anthony Backhouse

9 April 2022 41	Northampton Town	0–0	Bradford City	Northampton
15:00 BST	B.Lubala (yellow card) 90+4'	Report	L.Hendrie (yellow card) 90+2'	Stadium: Sixfields Stadium; Attendance: 5,548 (557); Referee: David Rock

15 April 2022 42	Oldham Athletic	0–2	Northampton Town	Oldham
15:00 BST	C.Piergianni (red card) 88'; K.Jameson (yellow card) 90'	Report	J.Guthrie 44'; J.Sowerby (yellow card) 64'; L.Appéré 66'; D.Rose (yellow card) 84'; A.Koiki (yellow card) 90'; S.Hoskins (yellow card) 90'	Stadium: Boundary Park; Attendance: 5,789 (456); Referee: Sam Purkiss

18 April 2022 43	Northampton Town	3–0	Harrogate Town	Northampton
15:00 BST	S.Hoskins 28', 63'; L.Appéré 59'	Report	J.Austerfield (yellow card) 45'; W.Burrell (yellow card) 90+5'	Stadium: Sixfields Stadium; Attendance: 5,168 (93); Referee: Robert Lewis

23 April 2022 44	Leyton Orient	2–4	Northampton Town	Leyton, London
15:00 BST	T.Archibald 45+1'; J.Brown 50'; S.Ogie (red card) 84'	Report	M.Pinnock 19' (yellow card) 43'; S.Hoskins (yellow card) 29'; J.Guthrie 32'; J.Eppiah 38', 45+3'; S.McWilliams (yellow card) 41'; J.Sowerby (yellow card) 75'; D.Rose (yellow card) 84'	Stadium: Brisbane Road; Attendance: 6,237 (1,250); Referee: Darren Handley

30 April 2022 45	Northampton Town	1–1	Exeter City	Northampton
15:00 BST	M.Pinnock 29'; J.Guthrie (yellow card) 87'	Report	T.Dieng (yellow card) 20'; J.Sparkes (yellow card) 54'; J.Brown (yellow card) 68'; S.Nombe 71'; A.Collins (yellow card) 88'; J.Key (yellow card) 90+4'	Stadium: Sixfields Stadium; Attendance: 7,764 (1,449); Referee: Simon Mather

7 May 2022 46	Barrow	1–3	Northampton Town	Barrow-in-Furness
15:00 BST	J.Kay 45' (yellow card) 45+1'	Report	S.Hoskins 5', 22' (yellow card) 49'; F.Horsfall 14'; D.Rose (yellow card) 77'; L.Roberts (red card) 90+2'	Stadium: Holker Street; Attendance: 4,603 (575); Referee: Ross Joyce

==== Play-offs ====
14 May 2022 Semi-final 1st leg	Mansfield	2–1	Northampton Town	Mansfield
19:45 BST	R.Oates 13'; J.Bowery 32'; G.Maris (yellow card) 50'; J.Perch (yellow card) 61'	Report	S.McWilliams (yellow card) 22'; A.Koiki 61'	Stadium: Field Mill; Attendance: 7,469 (1,221); Referee: Anthony Backhouse
Note: Live on Sky Sports

18 May 2022 Semi-final 2nd leg	Northampton Town	0–1 (1–3 agg.)	Mansfield Town	Northampton
19:45 BST	M.Pinnock (yellow card) 87'; F.Horsfall (yellow card) 90+2'	Report	S.McLaughlin 32'; J-J.O'Toole (yellow card) 53'; K.Wallace (yellow card) 63'	Stadium: Sixfields Stadium; Attendance: 7.619 (1,463); Referee: Ben Toner
Note: Live on Sky Sports

=== FA Cup ===
Northampton were drawn at home to Cambridge United in the first round.

6 November 2021 First round	Northampton Town	2–2	Cambridge United	Northampton
15:00 GMT	K.Etete 6'; F.Horsfall (yellow card) 12'; P.Lewis 35'; S.McWilliams (yellow card) 87'	Report	S.Smith 14', (yellow card) 63'; C.Masterson 66'	Stadium: Sixfields Stadium; Attendance: 3,792 (775); Referee: Martin Coy

16 November 2021 First round (R)	Cambridge United	3–1	Northampton Town	Cambridge
19:45 GMT	H.Knibbs 13'; S.Smith 40'; B.Worman 48'	Report	D.Rose 75'; A.McGowan (yellow card) 82'	Stadium: Abbey Stadium; Attendance: 3,068 (691); Referee: Darren Drysdale

=== EFL Cup ===
Northampton were drawn away to Coventry City in the first round and at home to AFC Wimbledon in the second round.

11 August 2021 First round	Coventry City	1–2	Northampton Town	Coventry
19:45 BST	T.Walker 13'	Report	S.Nelson (yellow card) 36'; K.Etete 52', 70'	Stadium: The Coventry Building Society Arena; Attendance: 5,284 (903); Referee: Ben Speedie

24 August 2021 Second round	Northampton Town	0–1	AFC Wimbledon	Northampton
19:45 BST	F.Horsfall (yellow card) 34'; S.Hoskins (yellow card) 85'	Report	D.Csóka (yellow card) 17'; A.Pressley (yellow card) 34'; A.Hartigan 90+5'	Stadium: Sixfields Stadium; Attendance: 3,257 (302); Referee: Ross Joyce

=== EFL Trophy ===
Cobblers were drawn into Southern Group D alongside Brighton & Hove Albion U21s, Forest Green Rovers and Walsall. The group stage ties were confirmed on 1 July 2021.

Pos	Div	Team	Pld	W	PW	PL	L	GF	GA	GD	Pts	Qualification
1	L2	Forest Green Rovers	3	1	1	1	0	5	3	+2	6	Advance to Round 2
2	L2	Walsall	3	1	1	0	1	2	3	−1	5	Advance to Round 2
3	ACA	Brighton & Hove Albion U21	3	1	0	1	1	4	4	0	4	
4	L2	Northampton Town	3	0	1	1	1	3	4	−1	3	

Source: EFL.com

31 August 2021 Group game 1	Forest Green Rovers	1–1 (2–4 p)	Northampton Town	Nailsworth
19:00 BST	M.Harriman 14' (o.g.)	Report	J.Flores (yellow card) 26'; S.Pollock 51', (yellow card) 73'; M.Harriman (yellow card) 79'	Stadium: The innocent New Lawn Stadium; Attendance: 892; Referee: Christopher Pollard
	Penalties
	M.Stevens (penalty scored); J.Evans (penalty missed); J.Matt (penalty missed); E.Adams (penalty scored)		D.Rose (penalty scored); N.Kabamba (penalty scored); D.Connolly (penalty scored); S.McWilliams (penalty missed); S.Pollock (penalty scored)

5 October 2021 Group game 2	Northampton Town	1–1 (2–4 p)	Walsall	Northampton
19:00 BST	F.Horsfall (yellow card) 63'; D.Connolly 72' (pen.); J.Flores (yellow card) 73'; B.Ashley-Seal (yellow card) 82'; S.McWilliams (yellow card) 88'	Report	E.Osadebe 4'; M.Monthé (yellow card) 10'; Z.Mills (yellow card) 19'; A.Bates (yellow card) 35'; R.Menayese (yellow card) 81'	Stadium: PTS Academy Stadium; Attendance: 1,285 (124); Referee: Charles Breakspear
	Penalties
	M.Pinnock (penalty missed); D.Connolly (penalty scored); K.Etete (penalty missed); J.Flores (penalty scored)		J.Earing (penalty scored); T.Shade (penalty scored); J.Labadie (penalty scored); K.Phillips (penalty scored)

2 November 2021 Group game 3	Northampton Town	1–2	Brighton & Hove Albion U21	Northampton
19:00 GMT	N.Kabamba 37'; L.Cross (yellow card) 73'	Report	E.Turns (yellow card) 64'; E.Ferguson 71'; L.Tolaj 90+2'	Stadium: Sixfields Stadium; Attendance: 1,014 (21); Referee: Christopher Pollard

=== Appearances, goals and cards ===
No.	Pos	Player	League Two			FA Cup			EFL Cup			EFL Trophy			Play-offs			Total			Discipline	
No.	Pos	Player	Starts	Sub	Goals	Starts	Sub	Goals	Starts	Sub	Goals	Starts	Sub	Goals	Starts	Sub	Goals	Starts	Sub	Goals	Booked	Sent off (straight red)
1	GK	Liam Roberts	46	–	–	2	–	–	–	–	–	–	–	–	1	–	–	49	–	–	1	1
2	RB	Michael Harriman	–	5	–	1	–	–	–	–	–	2	–	–	–	–	–	3	5	–	–	–
3	RB	Aaron McGowan	42	–	2	–	1	–	1	–	–	–	–	–	–	–	–	43	1	2	5	–
4	CM	Jack Sowerby	34	–	1	1	–	–	–	–	–	1	–	–	2	–	–	38	–	1	7	–
5	CB	Jon Guthrie	44	–	8	2	–	–	2	–	–	–	–	–	2	–	–	50	–	8	4	–
6	CB	Fraser Horsfall	45	–	9	2	–	–	2	–	–	1	1	–	2	–	–	52	1	9	7	1
7	W	Sam Hoskins	44	–	13	2	–	–	1	1	–	2	–	–	2	–	–	51	1	13	11	–
8	CM	Paul Lewis	37	2	6	2	–	1	2	–	–	–	–	–	–	–	–	41	2	7	8	1
10	W	Bez Lubala	5	9	–	–	–	–	–	–	–	–	–	–	–	–	–	5	9	–	3	–
11	W	Mitch Pinnock	44	2	9	1	1	–	–	2	–	1	–	–	2	–	–	48	5	9	6	–
12	CM	Scott Pollock	1	1	–	–	–	–	1	–	–	3	–	1	–	–	–	5	1	1	–	–
14	LB	Ali Koiki	37	5	–	2	–	–	2	–	–	1	1	–	2	–	1	44	6	1	5	–
15	CB	Sid Nelson	1	1	–	–	–	–	1	–	–	1	–	–	–	–	–	3	1	–	1	–
17	CM	Shaun McWilliams	34	2	–	2	–	–	1	–	–	1	1	–	2	–	–	40	3	–	12	–
18	ST	Chanka Zimba	2	10	1	–	–	–	–	–	–	–	–	–	–	1	–	2	11	1	–	–
19	AM	Idris Kanu	1	5	–	–	–	–	–	–	–	–	–	–	1	–	–	2	5	–	–	–
21	ST	Josh Eppiah	8	6	2	–	–	–	–	–	–	–	–	–	1	1	–	9	7	2	1	–
22	ST	Benny Ashley-Seal	1	8	2	–	–	–	–	1	–	2	1	–	–	–	–	3	10	2	–	–
23	LB	Joseph Mills	10	7	–	–	–	–	1	–	–	–	–	–	2	–	–	13	7	–	3	–
24	ST	Louis Appéré	16	2	3	–	–	–	–	–	–	–	–	–	2	–	–	18	2	3	1	–
26	GK	Jonny Maxted	–	–	–	–	–	–	2	–	–	2	–	–	1	–	–	5	–	–	–	–
29	CB	Josh Flanagan	–	–	–	–	–	–	–	–	–	1	–	–	–	–	–	1	–	–	–	–
32	ST	Danny Rose	14	22	1	1	1	1	2	–	–	–	1	–	–	2	–	16	25	2	11	–
34	W	Liam Cross	–	–	–	–	–	–	–	–	–	1	–	–	–	–	–	1	–	–	–	–
Youth team scholars:
25	CB	Josh Tomlinson	–	–	–	–	–	–	–	–	–	1	–	–	–	–	–	1	–	–	–	–
27	CM	Peter Abimbola	–	1	–	–	–	–	–	–	–	1	–	–	–	–	–	1	1	–	–	–
28	W	Miguel Ngwa	–	–	–	–	–	–	–	–	–	1	–	–	–	–	–	1	–	–	–	–
30	RB	Courtney Lashley	–	–	–	–	–	–	–	–	–	–	1	–	–	–	–	–	1	–	–	–
31	CM	Dylan Hill	–	–	–	–	–	–	–	–	–	–	1	–	–	–	–	–	1	–	–	–
35	CB	Max Dyche	1	–	–	–	–	–	–	–	–	–	1	–	–	–	–	1	1	–	–	–
36	GK	Charlie Woods	–	–	–	–	–	–	–	–	–	1	–	–	–	–	–	1	–	–	–	–
38	ST	Tommy Curry	–	–	–	–	–	–	–	–	–	–	1	–	–	–	–	–	1	–	–	–
Out on loan:
9	ST	Nicke Kabamba	6	15	–	–	2	–	–	1	–	3	–	1	–	–	–	8	18	1	–	–
–	CB	Ryan Nolan	–	–	–	–	–	–	–	–	–	–	–	–	–	–	–	–	–	–	–	–
Players no longer at club:
10	W	Dylan Connolly	3	13	–	1	1	–	1	1	–	2	–	1	–	–	–	7	15	1	1	–
16	CM	Jordan Flores	6	5	–	–	–	–	1	–	–	2	–	–	–	–	–	9	5	–	2	–
19	ST	Kion Etete	15	3	3	2	–	1	2	–	2	1	–	–	–	–	–	20	3	6	1	–
20	CB	Tyler Magloire	8	2	–	–	–	–	–	–	–	–	–	–	–	–	–	8	2	–	3	–
24	CB	Dominic Revan	1	2	–	1	–	–	–	–	–	2	–	–	–	–	–	4	2	–	–	–

=== Clean sheets ===
Includes all competitive matches.

As of match played 18 May 2022

No.	Nat.	Player	Matches Played	Clean Sheet %	League Two	FA Cup	EFL Cup	EFL Trophy	TOTAL
1	(England)	Liam Roberts	49	43%	21	0	0	0	21
26	(England)	Jonny Maxted	5	0%	0	0	0	0	0
Totals			52	40%	21	0	0	0	21

=== Scores overview ===
Northampton Town' score given first.

Win Draw Loss

Opposition	Home score	Away score	Double
Barrow	0 – 1	3 – 1	No
Bradford City	1 – 1	0 – 0	No
Bristol Rovers	0 – 1	1 – 2	No
Carlisle United	3 – 0	1 – 2	No
Colchester United	3 – 0	1 – 0	Yes
Crawley Town	0 – 1	0 – 0	No
Exeter City	1 – 1	2 – 1	No
Forest Green Rovers	1 – 1	0 – 1	No
Harrogate Town	3 – 0	2 – 1	Yes
Hartlepool United	2 – 0	1 – 2	No
Leyton Orient	1 – 0	4 – 2	Yes
Mansfield Town	2 – 0	0 – 1	No
Newport County	1 – 0	1 – 0	Yes
Oldham Athletic	2 – 1	2 – 0	Yes
Port Vale	1 – 0	0 – 0	No
Rochdale	1 – 3	0 – 1	No
Salford City	1 – 0	2 – 2	No
Scunthorpe United	2 – 0	0 – 0	No
Stevenage	3 – 0	2 – 1	Yes
Sutton United	0 – 2	0 – 0	No
Swindon Town	1 – 1	2 – 5	No
Tranmere Rovers	3 – 2	2 – 0	Yes
Walsall	1 – 1	1 – 0	No

== Awards ==
=== Club awards ===
At the end of the season, Northampton's annual award ceremony, including categories voted for by the players and backroom staff, the supporters, will see the players recognised for their achievements for the club throughout the 2021–22 season.

Player of the Year Award	Liam Roberts
Players' Player of the Year Award	Liam Roberts
Academy Player of the Year Award	Peter Abimbola
Goal of the Season Award	Aaron McGowan (vs. Stevenage); Mitch Pinnock (vs. Leyton Orient)

=== Divisional awards ===
Date	Nation	Winner	Award
Season	(England)	Jon Guthrie	EFL Awards Team of the Season
Season	(England)	Liam Roberts	PFA League Two Team of the Year
Season	(England)	Jon Guthrie	PFA League Two Team of the Year
Season	(England)	Fraser Horsfall	PFA League Two Team of the Year

== Transfers ==
=== Transfers in ===
Date from	Position	Nationality	Name	From	Fee	Ref.
22 June 2021	GK	(England)	Liam Roberts	(England) Walsall	Undisclosed	
1 July 2021 (Note: The transfer was announced on 15 June, and would become official on July 1 once his St Mirren contract expired)	RW	(Republic of Ireland)	Dylan Connolly	(Scotland) St Mirren	Free transfer	
1 July 2021 (Note: The transfer was announced on 24 June, and would become official on July 1 once his Livingston contract expired)	CB	(England)	Jon Guthrie	(Scotland) Livingston	Free transfer	
1 July 2021 (Note: The transfer was announced on 1 June, and would become official on July 1 once his Kilmarnock contract expired)	CF	(Democratic Republic of the Congo)	Nicke Kabamba	(Scotland) Kilmarnock	Free transfer	
1 July 2021 (Note: The transfer was announced on 10 June, and would become official on July 1 once his Tranmere Rovers contract expired)	CM	(England)	Paul Lewis	(England) Tranmere Rovers	Free transfer	
1 July 2021 (Note: The transfer was announced on 24 June, and would become official on July 1 once his Exeter City contract expired)	GK	(England)	Jonny Maxted	(England) Exeter City	Free transfer	
1 July 2021 (Note: The transfer was announced on 8 June, and would become official on July 1 once his Kilmarnock contract expired)	LW	(England)	Mitch Pinnock	(Scotland) Kilmarnock	Free transfer	
9 July 2021	CB	(England)	Sid Nelson	(England) Tranmere Rovers	Free transfer	
12 July 2021	RB	(England)	Aaron McGowan	(Scotland) Kilmarnock	Undisclosed	
23 July 2021	LB	(England)	Ali Koiki	(England) Bristol Rovers	Free transfer	
6 August 2021	CM	(England)	Jordan Flores	(England) Hull City	Free transfer	
31 January 2022	CF	(Scotland)	Louis Appéré	(Scotland) Dundee United	Undisclosed	
28 February 2022	CB	(Republic of Ireland)	Ryan Nolan	(Spain) Getafe	Free transfer	

=== Loans in ===
Date from	Position	Nationality	Name	From	Date until	Ref.
1 July 2021	CM	(England)	Jordan Flores	(England) Hull City	6 August 2021 (Note: Jordan Flores later signed permanently following his release from parent club, Hull City.)	
2 August 2021	CF	(England)	Kion Etete	(England) Tottenham Hotspur	4 January 2022	
31 August 2021	CB	(England)	Dominic Revan	(England) Aston Villa	January 2022	
6 January 2022	CF	(Zambia)	Chanka Zimba	(Wales) Cardiff City	End of season	
18 January 2022	CB	(England)	Tyler Magloire	(England) Blackburn Rovers	End of season	
26 January 2022	RW	(Sierra Leone)	Idris Kanu	(England) Peterborough United	End of season	
28 January 2022	CF	(Belgium)	Josh Eppiah	(England) Leicester City	End of season	
31 January 2022	LW	(Democratic Republic of the Congo)	Beryly Lubala	(England) Blackpool	End of season	

=== Loans out ===
Date from	Position	Nationality	Name	To	Date until	Ref.
5 August 2021	DF	(England)	Max Dyche	(England) Kettering Town		
13 August 2021	MF	(England)	Liam Cross	(England) St Ives Town	September 2021	
13 August 2021	DF	(England)	Josh Flanagan	(England) St Ives Town	September 2021	
27 November 2021	DF	(England)	Josh Flanagan	(England) Corby Town	1 January 2022	
29 November 2021	CM	(England)	Liam Cross	(England) Tamworth		
4 January 2022	DF	(England)	Josh Flanagan	(England) St Ives Town	February 2022	
21 January 2022	CF	(Democratic Republic of the Congo)	Nicke Kabamba	(England) Woking	End of season	
28 January 2022	CM	(England)	Liam Cross	(England) St Ives Town	26 February 2022	
4 February 2022	CB	(England)	Max Dyche	(England) Brackley Town		
26 February 2022	CM	(England)	Scott Pollock	(England) Boston United	26 March 2022	
9 March 2022	CB	(Republic of Ireland)	Ryan Nolan	(England) Kidderminster Harriers	End of season	

=== Transfers out ===
Date from	Position	Nationality	Name	To	Fee	Ref.
30 June 2021	GK	(England)	Steve Arnold	(England) Southend United	Released	
30 June 2021	CB	(Republic of Ireland)	Cian Bolger	(Northern Ireland) Larne	Rejected Option	
30 June 2021	CF	(England)	Ethan Johnston	(England) Banbury United	Released	
30 June 2021	CB	(England)	Lloyd Jones	(England) Cambridge United	Rejected Contract	
30 June 2021	LW	(England)	Ricky Korboa	(England) Sutton United	Released	
30 June 2021	RW	(Jamaica)	Mark Marshall	(England) Crawley Town	Released	
30 June 2021	LB	(Republic of Ireland)	Alan Sheehan	(England) Oldham Athletic	Released	
30 June 2021	SS	(England)	Matty Warburton	(England) FC Halifax Town	Released	
30 June 2021	CM	(England)	Ryan Watson	(England) Tranmere Rovers	Rejected Contract	
7 July 2021	GK	(Northern Ireland)	Dylan Berry	(England) Norwich City	Undisclosed	
7 July 2021	CF	(England)	Harry Smith	(England) Leyton Orient	Undisclosed	
16 August 2021	CF	(England)	Caleb Chukwuemeka	(England) Aston Villa	Undisclosed	
31 January 2022	AM	(Republic of Ireland)	Dylan Connolly	(England) Morecambe	Undisclosed	
31 January 2022	CM	(England)	Jordan Flores	(Republic of Ireland) Bohemians	Contract cancelled	
