= Josh Eppiah =

Belgian footballer

Personal information
- Full name: Joshua Felix Okpoda Eppiah
- Date of birth: 11 October 1998 (age 28)
- Place of birth: Belgium
- Position: Forward

Team information
- Current team: Morecambe
- Number: 22

Youth career
- 2008–2020: Leicester City

Senior career*
Years	Team	Apps	(Gls)
2020–2023	Leicester City	0	(0)
2020–2021	→ OH Leuven (loan)	11	(1)
2022	→ Northampton Town (loan)	14	(2)
2022–2023	→ Northampton Town (loan)	3	(0)
2024	Amazonas	0	(0)
2025–	Morecambe	0	(0)
- * Club domestic league appearances and goals as of 21:03, 1 September 2025 (UTC)

Joshua Felix Okpoda Eppiah (born 11 October 1998) is a Belgian professional footballer who plays as a forward for Morecambe.

== Club career ==
Eppiah made his professional debut for OH Leuven on 23 November 2020 in the home match against Sint-Truiden. Eppiah was subbed in on the hour mark to replace Olivier Myny, scored after 73 minutes to put OH Leuven in the lead 2–1, but made a defensive error just five minutes before time resulting in Sint-Truiden scoring the equaliser.

On 28 January 2022, he joined League Two club Northampton Town on loan until the end of the season.

After a spell in Brazil with Amazonas, Eppiah joined Morecambe in September 2025. On 16 May 2026, Morecambe announced he was being released.

== International career ==
Eppiah was born in Belgium and is of Nigerian descent. He is a youth international for Belgium.

== Career statistics ==
As of match played 20 August 2022

Club	Season	League			National Cup		League Cup		Other		Total	
Club	Season	Division	Apps	Goals	Apps	Goals	Apps	Goals	Apps	Goals	Apps	Goals
Leicester City U21	2017–18	—			—		—		5 (Note: Appearance in EFL Trophy)	0	5	0
Leicester City U21	2019–20	—			—		—		4 (Note: Appearance in EFL Trophy)	2	4	2
Leicester City U21	Total		0	0	0	0	0	0	9	2	9	2
Leicester City	2020–21	Premier League	0	0	0	0	0	0	0	0	0	0
Leicester City	2021–22	Premier League	0	0	0	0	0	0	0	0	0	0
Leicester City	Total		0	0	0	0	0	0	0	0	0	0
OH Leuven (loan)	2022–23	Jupiler Pro League	11	1	1	0	0	0	0	0	12	1
Northampton Town (loan)	2021–22	League Two	14	2	0	0	0	0	2 (Note: Appearances in League Two play-offs)	0	16	2
Northampton Town (loan)	2022–23	League Two	0	0	0	0	0	0	0	0	0	0
Northampton Town (loan)	Total		14	2	0	0	0	0	2	0	16	2
Career total			25	3	1	0	0	0	11	2	37	5
