= Mitch Pinnock =

English footballer (born 1994)

Personal information
- Full name: Mitchell Bernard Pinnock
- Date of birth: 12 December 1994 (age 31)
- Place of birth: Gravesend, England
- Height: 6 ft 1 in (1.85 m)
- Position: Midfielder

Team information
- Current team: Bromley
- Number: 11

Youth career
- Glebe
- 2003–2010: Arsenal
- 2010–2013: Southend United

Senior career*
Years	Team	Apps	(Gls)
2013–2014	Southend United	2	(0)
2014	→ East Thurrock United (loan)	10	(0)
2014–2015	Bromley	6	(0)
2014–2015	→ Concord Rangers (loan)	3	(0)
2015	→ Tonbridge Angels (loan)	5	(1)
2015	→ Tonbridge Angels (loan)	5	(3)
2015	Maidstone United	6	(0)
2015	→ Tonbridge Angels (loan)	4	(0)
2015–2016	Dover Athletic	2	(0)
2016	Kingstonian	8	(1)
2016–2018	Dover Athletic	65	(8)
2018–2020	AFC Wimbledon	59	(6)
2020–2021	Kilmarnock	30	(4)
2021–2025	Northampton Town	182	(24)
2025–	Bromley	46	(2)

International career
2018	England C	1	(0)
- * Club domestic league appearances and goals as of 22:07, 2 May 2026 (UTC)

Mitchell Bernard Pinnock (born 12 December 1994) is an English professional footballer who plays as a midfielder for EFL League One club Bromley.

== Career ==
Pinnock began his career with Southend United and made his professional debut on 16 April 2013 in a 2–0 victory against Aldershot Town. He had a loan spell at East Thurrock United of the Isthmian League Premier Division in 2014. Following his release from Southend, he joined Bromley. He made his debut for the club in a 1–0 home win over Bath City on 18 October, coming on as a second-half substitute. In a home fixture against Hemel Hempstead Town, Pinnock played over 45 minutes as goalkeeper, following Seb Brown's sending off. He made two further league appearances for Bromley, before joining Concord Rangers on loan in December. In February 2015, he moved to Tonbridge Angels on a month's loan. He was recalled from his loan early by Bromley, due to injuries to several attacking players. However, he returned to Tonbridge at the end of March, on loan for the remainder of the season.

During the summer of 2015 he joined Maidstone United, subsequently going out to Tonbridge Angels for a third loan spell in September. Following his release by Maidstone United in November, he was signed by Dover Athletic later that same week.

After a brief spell with Kingstonian, he re-signed for Dover Athletic in July 2016 until the end of the 2016–17 season.

In the summer of 2018, he signed with AFC Wimbledon on a permanent transfer.

=== Kilmarnock ===
In the summer of 2020, he signed a one-year deal with Kilmarnock. Pinnock scored his first goal for the club in November 2020 in a Betfred Cup victory over Dumbarton, cutely finishing over the goalkeeper on the brink of half-time.

On 4 June 2021, it was announced that Pinnock would be leaving the club after one season after he had turned down the offer of a new contract.

=== Northampton Town ===
On 8 June 2021, Pinnock was announced to have agreed to join recently relegated League Two side Northampton Town on a two-year contract, joining the club on 1 July when his contract in Scotland would expire. Pinnock was nominated for the October League Two Player of the Month Award after claiming five assists across the course of the month, ultimately missing out to Dom Telford however.

On 30 May 2025, Northampton announced the player had rejected a new contract and would be leaving the club.

=== Return to Bromley ===
On 6 June 2025, Pinnock agreed to return to League Two side Bromley, over ten years following a short spell with the then National League South club.

On 18 April 2026, Bromley were promoted to League One for the first time in the club's history. The following day at the EFL Awards, he was named in the League Two Team of the Season.

== Career statistics ==
As of match played 2 May 2026

Appearances and goals by club, season and competition
Club	Season	League			National Cup (Note: Includes appearances in FA Cup and Scottish Cup)		League Cup (Note: Includes appearances in EFL Cup and Scottish League Cup)		Other		Total	
Club	Season	Division	Apps	Goals	Apps	Goals	Apps	Goals	Apps	Goals	Apps	Goals
Southend United	2012–13	League Two	2	0	0	0	0	0	0	0	2	0
Southend United	2013–14	League Two	0	0	0	0	0	0	0	0	0	0
Southend United	Total		2	0	0	0	0	0	0	0	2	0
East Thurrock United (loan)	2013–14	Ryman League Premier	10	0	0	0	—		0	0	10	0
Bromley	2014–15	Conference South	6	0	1	0	—		0	0	7	0
Concord Rangers (loan)	2014–15	Conference South	3	0	0	0	—		0	0	3	0
Tonbridge Angels (loan)	2014–15	Ryman League Premier	10	4	0	0	—		0	0	10	4
Maidstone United	2015–16	National League South	6	0	0	0	—		0	0	6	0
Tonbridge Angels (loan)	2015–16	Ryman League Premier	4	0	0	0	—		0	0	4	0
Dover Athletic	2015–16	National League	2	0	0	0	—		0	0	2	0
Kingstonian	2015–16	Ryman League Premier	8	1	0	0	—		0	0	8	1
Dover Athletic	2016–17	National League	23	0	2	1	—		2 (Note: Appearance(s) in FA Trophy)	0	27	1
Dover Athletic	2017–18	National League	42	8	2	0	—		3	3	47	11
Dover Athletic	Total		67	8	4	1	0	0	5	3	76	12
AFC Wimbledon	2018–19	League One	34	3	5	1	2	0	3 (Note: Appearance(s) in EFL Trophy)	0	44	4
AFC Wimbledon	2019–20	League One	25	3	2	0	0	0	2	0	29	3
AFC Wimbledon	Total		59	6	7	1	2	0	5	0	73	7
Kilmarnock	2020–21	Scottish Premiership	30	4	3	0	2	1	2 (Note: 2 appearances in Scottish Premiership relegation play-offs)	0	37	5
Northampton Town	2021–22	League Two	46	9	2	0	2	0	3 (Note: 2 appearances in League Two play-offs)	0	53	9
Northampton Town	2022–23	League Two	45	6	1	0	1	0	1	0	48	6
Northampton Town	2023–24	League One	45	7	1	1	1	0	1	0	48	8
Northampton Town	2024–25	League One	46	2	1	0	1	0	3	0	51	2
Northampton Town	Total		182	24	5	1	5	0	8	0	200	25
Bromley	2025–26	League Two	46	2	1	0	2	0	0	0	49	2
Career total			435	49	21	3	11	1	20	3	487	56

== Honours ==
Northampton Town

- EFL League Two promotion: 2022–23

Bromley

- EFL League Two: 2025–26

Individual

- EFL League Two Team of the Season: 2022–23, 2025–26
- Northampton Town Player of the Year: 2024–25
- PFA Team of the Year: 2025–26 League Two
