= 2020–21 Northampton Town F.C. season =

Northampton Town
2020–21 season
- Chairman: Kelvin Thomas
- Manager: Keith Curle (until 10 February); Jon Brady (from 10 February)
- Stadium: Sixfields Stadium
- League One: 22nd (Relegated)
- FA Cup: First round
- EFL Cup: Second round
- EFL Trophy: Third round
- Top goalscorer: League: Ryan Watson (8); All: Ryan Watson (9)
Home colours	Away colours

The 2020–21 season was Northampton Town's 124th season in their history and the first season back in League One, after promotion via the play-offs the previous season. Alongside competing in League One, the club also participated in the FA Cup, EFL Cup and EFL Trophy.

== Players ==
As of match played 9 May 2021.

No.	Name	Position	Nat.	Place of birth	Date of birth (age)	Apps	Goals	Previous club	Date signed	Fee
Goalkeepers
1	Steve Arnold	GK	(England)	Welham Green	22 August 1989 (aged 31)	22	0	Shrewsbury Town	5 June 2019	Undisclosed
13	Jonathan Mitchell	GK	(England)	Hartlepool	24 November 1994 (aged 26)	42	0	Derby County	4 August 2020	Loan
Defenders
2	Michael Harriman	RB	(Republic of Ireland)	Chichester (ENG)	23 October 1992 (aged 28)	67	1	Wycombe Wanderers	4 September 2019	Free
5	Cian Bolger (c)	CB	(Republic of Ireland)	Celbridge	12 March 1992 (aged 29)	31	1	Lincoln City	21 August 2020	Free
6	Fraser Horsfall	CB	(England)	Huddersfield	12 November 1996 (aged 24)	47	3	Macclesfield Town	14 August 2020	Free
15	Peter Kioso	RB	(Republic of Ireland)	Swords, County Dublin	15 August 1999 (aged 21)	21	3	Luton Town	25 January 2021	Loan
23	Joseph Mills	LB	(England)	Swindon	30 October 1989 (aged 31)	31	2	Forest Green Rovers	8 August 2020	Free
28	Lloyd Jones	CB	(England)	Plymouth	12 November 1996 (aged 24)	34	0	Luton Town	29 December 2020	Free
44	Alan Sheehan	CB	(Republic of Ireland)	Athlone	14 September 1986 (aged 34)	15	1	Lincoln City	28 November 2020	Free
Midfielders
4	Jack Sowerby	CM	(England)	Preston	23 March 1995 (aged 26)	31	0	Fleetwood Town	18 September 2020	Undisclosed
7	Sam Hoskins	AM	(England)	Dorchester	4 February 1993 (aged 28)	244	40	Yeovil Town	1 August 2015	Free
8	Ryan Watson	CM	(England)	Crewe	7 June 1993 (aged 27)	101	17	Milton Keynes Dons	3 June 2019	Free
11	Ricky Korboa	W	(England)	Liverpool	2 August 1996 (aged 24)	22	2	Carshalton Athletic	1 September 2020	Undisclosed
12	Scott Pollock	CM	(England)	Northampton	22 January 2001 (aged 20)	23	1	Football & Education Programme	26 March 2019	N/A
14	Mickel Miller	W	(England)	Croydon	2 December 1995 (aged 25)	12	0	Rotherham United	14 January 2021	Loan
17	Shaun McWilliams	CM	(England)	Northampton	14 August 1998 (aged 22)	114	1	Academy	30 April 2016	N/A
18	Bryn Morris	DM	(England)	Hartlepool	26 April 1996 (aged 25)	22	0	Portsmouth	18 January 2021	Loan
19	Morgan Roberts	W	(Wales)	Northampton (ENG)	20 December 2000 (aged 20)	18	0	Academy	17 May 2018	N/A
20	Matt Warburton	AM	(England)	Manchester	24 May 1992 (aged 28)	34	4	Stockport County	7 May 2019	Free
45	Mark Marshall	W	(Jamaica)	Manchester Parish	5 May 1987 (aged 34)	41	2	Gillingham	25 January 2020	Free
Forwards
9	Harry Smith	CF	(England)	London	18 May 1995 (aged 25)	50	11	Macclesfield Town	17 May 2019	Undisclosed
10	Alex Jones	CF	(England)	Sutton Coldfield	28 September 1994 (aged 26)	9	1	Partick Thistle	2 March 2021	Free
22	Benny Ashley-Seal	CF	(England)	Southwark	21 November 1998 (aged 22)	29	3	Wolverhampton Wanderers	7 September 2020	Undisclosed
26	Ryan Edmondson	CF	(England)	Harrogate	20 May 2001 (aged 19)	21	2	Leeds United	14 January 2021	Loan
29	Danny Rose	CF	(England)	Barnsley	10 December 1993 (aged 27)	44	5	Mansfield Town	2 October 2020	Undisclosed
30	Caleb Chukwuemeka	CF	(England)	Northampton	25 January 2002 (aged 19)	28	2	Academy	4 February 2020	N/A
31	Ethan Johnston	CF	(England)	Kettering	30 June 2002 (aged 18)	1	0	Academy	20 January 2020	N/A

== Pre-season ==
The Cobblers announced pre-season friendlies against Leyton Orient and Luton Town

22 August 2020 Friendly	Northampton Town	1–0	Leyton Orient	Northampton
13:00 BST	S.Hoskins 15'	Report		Stadium: Sixfields Stadium; Attendance: Behind Closed Doors; Referee: Dean Whitestone

25 August 2020 Friendly	Northampton Town	2–2	West Bromwich Albion U23	Northampton
14:00 BST	H.Smith 55'; J.Mills 60'	Report	T.Dyce 45'; O.Windsor 61'	Stadium: Sixfields Stadium; Attendance: Behind Closed Doors

29 August 2020 Friendly	Northampton Town	0–3	Luton Town	Northampton
13:30 BST		Report	J.Collins 62'; K.LuaLua 77'; M.Cranie 81'	Stadium: Sixfields Stadium; Attendance: Behind Closed Doors; Referee: Andy Woolmer

== Competitions ==
=== EFL League One ===
==== League table ====
Pos	Team	Pld	W	D	L	GF	GA	GD	Pts	Promotion, qualification or relegation
17	Shrewsbury Town	46	13	15	18	50	57	−7	54	
18	Plymouth Argyle	46	14	11	21	53	80	−27	53	
19	AFC Wimbledon	46	12	15	19	54	70	−16	51	
20	Wigan Athletic	46	13	9	24	54	77	−23	48	
21	Rochdale (R)	46	11	14	21	61	78	−17	47	Relegation to EFL League Two
22	Northampton Town (R)	46	11	12	23	41	67	−26	45	Relegation to EFL League Two
23	Swindon Town (R)	46	13	4	29	55	89	−34	43	Relegation to EFL League Two
24	Bristol Rovers (R)	46	10	8	28	40	70	−30	38	Relegation to EFL League Two

Source: EFL Official Website
Rules for classification: 1) Points; 2) Goal difference; 3) Number of goals scored; 4) Head-to-head results; 5) Wins; 6) Away goals; 7) Penalty points (sec 9.5); 8) 12-point sending off offences
(R) Relegated

==== Results summary ====
Overall								Home						Away					
Pld	W	D	L	GF	GA	GD	Pts	W	D	L	GF	GA	GD	W	D	L	GF	GA	GD
46	11	12	23	41	68	−27	45	8	5	10	20	27	−7	3	7	13	21	41	−20

Last updated: 9 May 2021.

==== League position by match ====
Round	1	2	3	4	5	6	7	8	9	10	11	12	13	14	15	16	17	18	19	20	21	22	23	24	25	26	27	28	29	30	31	32	33	34	35	36	37	38	39	40	41	42	43	44	45	46
Ground	H	A	H	A	H	A	H	H	A	A	H	H	A	A	H	H	A	A	H	H	H	A	A	A	A	H	H	A	A	H	A	H	H	A	A	H	H	A	H	A	H	A	H	A	H	A
Result	D	W	L	L	L	L	W	L	L	W	D	L	W	D	W	L	L	L	L	W	D	L	D	L	D	L	L	D	L	D	L	W	W	L	D	L	W	L	W	L	D	L	W	D	L	D
Position	10	7	10	16	19	22	16	19	20	18	17	19	16	16	16	16	18	20	21	19	19	21	20	21	22	23	23	21	22	23	24	22	19	21	20	22	20	20	19	19	19	21	21	21	22	22

Updated to match(es) played on 9 May 2021. Source:
A = Away; H = Home; W = Win; D = Draw; L = Loss

==== Matches ====
Win Draw Loss Postponed

The 2020–21 season fixtures were released on 21 August.

12 September 2020 1	Northampton Town	2–2	AFC Wimbledon	Northampton
15:00 BST	M.Warburton 19'; R.Korboa 31'	Report	E.Chislett 1'; N.Guinness-Walker 23'	Stadium: Sixfields Stadium; Attendance: Behind Closed Doors; Referee: Ollie Yates

19 September 2020 2	Shrewsbury Town	1–2	Northampton Town	Shrewsbury
15:00 BST	S.Whalley 54'	Report	M.Marshall 12'; S.Hoskins 65'	Stadium: New Meadow; Attendance: 1,000; Referee: Neil Hair

26 September 2020 3	Northampton Town	0–2	Hull City	Northampton
15:00 BST		Report	K.Lewis-Potter 34'; G.Honeyman 44'	Stadium: Sixfields Stadium; Attendance: Behind Closed Doors; Referee: Alan Young

3 October 2020 4	Bristol Rovers	2–0	Northampton Town	Horfield, Bristol
15:00 BST	B.Hanlan 55' (pen.); J.Baldwin 79'	Report	J.Martin (red card) 60'	Stadium: Memorial Ground; Attendance: Behind Closed Doors; Referee: Sam Purkiss

10 October 2020 5	Northampton Town	0–2	Peterborough United	Northampton
15:00 BST		Report	N.Thompson 33'; R.Brown 80'	Stadium: Sixfields Stadium; Attendance: Behind Closed Doors; Referee: Brett Huxtable

17 October 2020 6	Plymouth Argyle	2–1	Northampton Town	Plymouth
15:00 BST	F.Nouble 41'; K.Watts 86'	Report	R.Korboa 62'	Stadium: Home Park; Attendance: Behind Closed Doors; Referee: Craig Hicks

20 October 2020 7	Northampton Town	2–1	Swindon Town	Northampton
19:45 BST	C.Missilou 7'; D.Rose 28'	Report	T.Smith 76' (pen.)	Stadium: Sixfields Stadium; Attendance: Behind Closed Doors; Referee: Jarred Gillett

24 October 2020 8	Northampton Town	0–2	Charlton Athletic	Northampton
15:00 BST		Report	D.Pratley 54'; J.Sowerby 59' (o.g.)	Stadium: Sixfields Stadium; Attendance: Behind Closed Doors; Referee: Sam Allison

27 October 2020 9	Portsmouth	4–0	Northampton Town	Portsmouth
19:45 GMT	J.Marquis 39', 47'; R.Curtis 50'; M.Harness 83'	Report		Stadium: Fratton Park; Attendance: Behind Closed Doors; Referee: Trevor Kettle

31 October 2020 10	Wigan Athletic	2–3	Northampton Town	Wigan
15:00 GMT	J.Garner 63' (pen.); T.James 75'	Report	D.Rose 13'; S.Hoskins 21'; C.Chukwuemeka 66'	Stadium: DW Stadium; Attendance: Behind Closed Doors; Referee: Josh Smith

3 November 2020 11	Northampton Town	0–0	Milton Keynes Dons	Northampton
19:45 GMT		Report		Stadium: Sixfields Stadium; Attendance: Behind Closed Doors; Referee: Thomas Bramall

14 November 2020 12	Northampton Town	0–1	Accrington Stanley	Northampton
15:00 GMT		Report	J.Russell 2'	Stadium: Sixfields Stadium; Attendance: Behind Closed Doors; Referee: Kevin Johnson

21 November 2020 13	Burton Albion	1–3	Northampton Town	Burton upon Trent
15:00 GMT	L.Akins 90+2' (pen.)	Report	H.Smith 2', 67'; C.Lines 81'	Stadium: Pirelli Stadium; Attendance: Behind Closed Doors; Referee: Seb Stockbridge

24 November 2020 14	Rochdale	1–1	Northampton Town	Rochdale
19:00 GMT	S.Humphrys 85'	Report	H.Smith 20'	Stadium: Spotland Stadium; Attendance: Behind Closed Doors; Referee: Andy Haines

1 December 2020 15	Northampton Town	1–0	Fleetwood Town	Northampton
19:45 GMT	C.Bolger 47'	Report		Stadium: Sixfields Stadium; Attendance: Behind Closed Doors; Referee: Trevor Kettle

5 December 2020 16	Northampton Town	0–2	Doncaster Rovers	Northampton
15:00 GMT	S.McWilliams (red card) 18'	Report	T.John-Jules 36'; J.Wright 57'; B.Whiteman (penalty missed)	Stadium: Sixfields Stadium; Attendance: 1,164; Referee: Graham Salisbury

12 December 2020 17	Crewe Alexandra	2–1	Northampton Town	Crewe
15:00 GMT	O.Dale 53'; R.Wintle 90+4'	Report	R.Holmes 3'; J.Martin (yellow card) 26' (yellow-red card) 70'	Stadium: Gresty Road; Attendance: 2,000; Referee: John Busby

15 December 2020 18	Oxford United	4–0	Northampton Town	Oxford
19:45 GMT	M.Taylor 49', 89'; O.Shodipo 65'; D.Agyei 90+3'	Report		Stadium: Kassam Stadium; Attendance: 2,000; Referee: Declan Bourne

19 December 2020 19	Northampton Town	0–4	Lincoln City	Northampton
15:00 GMT		Report	A.Scully 2'; T.Hopper 42'; B.Johnson 83', 90+8'	Stadium: Sixfields Stadium; Attendance: 2,000; Referee: Robert Lewis

29 December 2020 20	Northampton Town	3–1	Gillingham	Northampton
19:45 GMT	S.Hoskins 31' (pen.); D.Rose 35'; A.Sheehan 47'	Report	K.Dempsey 45'	Stadium: Sixfields Stadium; Attendance: Behind Closed Doors; Referee: Carl Boyeson

2 January 2021 21	Northampton Town	0–0	Sunderland	Northampton
15:00 GMT		Report		Stadium: Sixfields Stadium; Attendance: Behind Closed Doors; Referee: Leigh Doughty

23 January 2021 22	Lincoln City	2–1	Northampton Town	Lincoln
15:00 GMT	C.McGrandles 75'; A.Scully 84'	Report	D.Rose 90+6'	Stadium: Sincil Bank; Attendance: Behind Closed Doors; Referee: Anthony Backhouse

26 January 2021 23	Fleetwood Town	0–0	Northampton Town	Fleetwood
19:45 GMT		Report		Stadium: Fleetwood; Attendance: Behind Closed Doors; Referee: Martin Coy

2 February 2021 24	Blackpool	2–0	Northampton Town	Blackpool
19:00 GMT	M.Ekpiteta 12'; J.Yates 90+2'	Report		Stadium: Bloomfield Road; Attendance: Behind Closed Doors; Referee: James Oldham

6 February 2021 25	Accrington Stanley	0–0	Northampton Town	Accrington
15:00 GMT	J.Pritchard (yellow card) 71' (yellow-red card) 85'	Report		Stadium: Crown Ground; Attendance: Behind Closed Doors; Referee: Peter Wright

9 February 2021 26	Northampton Town	0–1	Wigan Athletic	Northampton
19:00 GMT		Report	C.Lang 82'	Stadium: Sixfields Stadium; Attendance: Behind Closed Doors; Referee: Marc Edwards

13 February 2021 27	Northampton Town	0–2	Burton Albion	Northampton
15:00 GMT		Report	M.Bostwick 77'; R.Edwards 90+4'	Stadium: Sixfields Stadium; Attendance: Behind Closed Doors; Referee: Scott Oldham

16 February 2021 28	Ipswich Town	0–0	Northampton Town	Ipswich
19:00 GMT	F.Downes (red card) 90+3'	Report		Stadium: Portman Road; Attendance: Behind Closed Doors; Referee: Darren Drysdale

20 February 2021 29	Milton Keynes Dons	4–3	Northampton Town	Bletchley
19:00 GMT	A.Surman 13'; W.Grigg 34'; C.Jerome 83'; C.Brown 88'	Report	F.Horsfall 2'; R.Watson 46'; P.Kioso 78'	Stadium: Stadium MK; Attendance: Behind Closed Doors; Referee: Sam Barrott

23 February 2021 30	Northampton Town	0–0	Rochdale	Northampton
19:00 GMT		Report		Stadium: Sixfields Stadium; Attendance: Behind Closed Doors; Referee: Kevin Johnson

27 February 2021 31	Swindon Town	2–1	Northampton Town	Swindon
15:00 GMT	S.Twine 45+2'; B.Pitman 69'	Report	R.Watson 26'	Stadium: County Ground; Attendance: Behind Closed Doors; Referee: Ben Speedie

3 March 2021 32	Northampton Town	2–0	Plymouth Argyle	Northampton
19:00 GMT	R.Watson 40', 65'	Report	S.Woods (red card) 90+1'	Stadium: Sixfields Stadium; Attendance: Behind Closed Doors; Referee: Graham Salisbury

6 March 2021 33	Northampton Town	4–1	Portsmouth	Northampton
15:00 GMT	R.Watson 20', 23'; F.Horsfall 32'; R.Edmondson 43'	Report	E.Harrison 73' (pen.)	Stadium: Sixfields Stadium; Attendance: Behind Closed Doors; Referee: Andy Haines

9 March 2021 34	Charlton Athletic	2–1	Northampton Town	Charlton, London
19:00 GMT	C.Washington 65' (pen.), 84'	Report	A.Jones 90+3'	Stadium: The Valley; Attendance: Behind Closed Doors; Referee: Paul Howard

13 March 2021 35	Doncaster Rovers	0–0	Northampton Town	Doncaster
15:00 GMT		Report		Stadium: Keepmoat Stadium; Attendance: Behind Closed Doors; Referee: Tom Neild

20 March 2021 36	Northampton Town	0–1	Crewe Alexandra	Northampton
15:00 GMT		Report	O.Dale 74'	Stadium: Sixfields Stadium; Attendance: Behind Closed Doors; Referee: Sam Allison

23 March 2021 37	Northampton Town	1–0	Oxford United	Northampton
19:00 GMT	S.Hoskins 55'	Report		Stadium: Sixfields Stadium; Attendance: Behind Closed Doors; Referee: Christopher Pollard

27 March 2021 38	AFC Wimbledon	1–0	Northampton Town	Wimbledon, London
15:00 GMT	J.Pigott 88'	Report	S.Hoskins (penalty missed) 90+7'	Stadium: Plough Lane; Attendance: Behind Closed Doors; Referee: Ben Toner

2 April 2021 39	Northampton Town	1–0	Shrewsbury Town	Northampton
15:00 BST	R.Watson 27'	Report		Stadium: Sixfields Stadium; Attendance: Behind Closed Doors; Referee: Ross Joyce

5 April 2021 40	Hull City	3–0	Northampton Town	Kingston upon Hull
15:00 BST	C.Elder 30'; K.Lewis-Potter 44'; G.Whyte 90+3'	Report		Stadium: KCOM Stadium; Attendance: Behind Closed Doors; Referee: Thomas Bramall

10 April 2021 41	Northampton Town	1–1	Bristol Rovers	Northampton
15:00 BST	S.Hoskins 78' (pen.)	Report	L.Leahy 19'	Stadium: Sixfields Stadium; Attendance: Behind Closed Doors; Referee: David Rock

16 April 2021 42	Peterborough United	3–1	Northampton Town	Peterborough
19:45 BST	S.Szmodics 33', 48'; J.Clarke-Harris 67' (pen.)	Report	S.Hoskins 43' (pen.)	Stadium: London Road Stadium; Attendance: Behind Closed Doors; Referee: Lee Swabey

20 April 2021 43	Northampton Town	3–0	Ipswich Town	Northampton
19:00 BST	P.Kioso 8', 32'; R.Watson 84'	Report		Stadium: Sixfields Stadium; Attendance: Behind Closed Doors; Referee: James Bell

24 April 2021 44	Gillingham	2–2	Northampton Town	Gillingham
15:00 BST	V.Oliver 11'; O.Lee 68'	Report	R.Edmondson 79'; F.Horsfall 83'	Stadium: Priestfield Stadium; Attendance: Behind Closed Doors; Referee: Carl Brook

1 May 2021 45	Northampton Town	0–3	Blackpool	Northampton
15:00 BST		Report	L.Garbutt 19'; J.Yates 75', 86'	Stadium: Sixfields Stadium; Attendance: Behind Closed Doors; Referee: Peter Wright

9 May 2021 46	Sunderland	1–1	Northampton Town	Sunderland
12:00 BST	C.Winchester 87'	Report	S.Hoskins 84'	Stadium: Stadium of Light; Attendance: Behind Closed Doors; Referee: Sam Barrott

=== FA Cup ===
The draw for the first round was made on Monday 26, October.

9 November 2020 First round	Oxford City	2–1	Northampton Town	Marston, Oxford
19:45 GMT	J.Roberts 12'; J.Ashby 68' (pen.)	Report	S.Hoskins 7'	Stadium: Marsh Lane; Attendance: Behind Closed Doors; Referee: Paul Howard

=== EFL Cup ===
The first round draw was made on 18 August. The draw for both the second and third round were confirmed on September 6, live on Sky Sports by Phil Babb.

5 September 2020 First round	Northampton Town	3–0	Cardiff City	Northampton
15:00 BST	H.Smith 33' (pen.); M.Warburton 49'; R.Watson 59'	Report		Stadium: Sixfields Stadium; Attendance: Behind Closed Doors; Referee: Darren Drysdale

14 September 2020 Second round	Bristol City	4–0	Northampton Town	Ashton Gate. Bristol
19:45 BST	C.Martin 43'; K.Palmer 48', 88'; A.Semenyo 82'	Report		Stadium: Ashton Gate Stadium; Attendance: Behind Closed Doors; Referee: Tom Nield

=== EFL Trophy ===
The regional group stage draw was confirmed on 18 August. The second round draw was made by Matt Murray on 20 November, at St Andrew’s. The third round was made on 10 December 2020 by Jon Parkin.

Pos	Div	Team	Pld	W	PW	PL	L	GF	GA	GD	Pts	Qualification
1	L1	Milton Keynes Dons	3	2	0	0	1	7	5	+2	6	Advance to Round 2
2	L1	Northampton Town	3	1	1	0	1	6	3	+3	5	Advance to Round 2
3	L2	Stevenage	3	1	0	1	1	4	4	0	4	
4	ACA	Southampton U21	3	1	0	0	2	3	8	−5	3	

Source: EFL.com

8 September 2020 South Group C	Milton Keynes Dons	3–1	Northampton Town	Bletchley
19:00 BST	R.Poole 34'; S.Nombe 74'; M.Sorinola 77'	Report	J.Mills 13'	Stadium: Stadium MK; Attendance: Behind Closed Doors; Referee: Christopher Pollard

6 October 2020 South Group C	Northampton Town	5–0	Southampton U21	Northampton
19:45 BST	J.Mills 7'; M.Marshall 40'; B.Ashley-Seal 46', 58'; C.Chukwuemeka 50'	Report		Stadium: Sixfields Stadium; Attendance: Behind Closed Doors; Referee: David Rock

17 November 2020 South Group C	Northampton Town	0–0 (4–2 p)	Stevenage	Northampton
19:00 GMT		Report		Stadium: Sixfields Stadium; Attendance: Behind Closed Doors; Referee: Chris Sarginson
	Penalties
	C.Lines (penalty scored); D.Rose (penalty missed); S.McWilliams (penalty scored); F.Horsfall (penalty scored); C.Chukwuemeka (penalty scored)		D.Newton (penalty missed); C.Carter (penalty scored); T.Marsh (penalty scored); F.Akinwande (penalty missed)

8 December 2020 Second round	Exeter City	1–2	Northampton Town	Exeter
19:00 GMT	N.Atangana 51'	Report	D.Rose 22'; B.Ashley-Seal 82'	Stadium: St James Park; Attendance: 714; Referee: Carl Brook

12 January 2021 Third round	Northampton Town	0–2	Milton Keynes Dons	Northampton
19:45 GMT		Report	S.Walker 27', 83' (pen.)	Stadium: Sixfields Stadium; Attendance: Behind Closed Doors; Referee: Craig Hicks

=== Appearances, goals and cards ===
No.	Pos	Player	League One			FA Cup			EFL Cup			EFL Trophy			Total			Discipline	
No.	Pos	Player	Starts	Sub	Goals	Starts	Sub	Goals	Starts	Sub	Goals	Starts	Sub	Goals	Starts	Sub	Goals	Booked	Sent off (straight red)
1	GK	Steve Arnold	11	–	–	–	–	–	1	–	–	–	–	–	12	–	–	1	–
2	RB	Michael Harriman	22	8	–	–	–	–	2	–	–	5	–	–	29	8	–	2	–
4	CM	Jack Sowerby	26	2	–	–	–	–	–	–	–	2	1	–	28	3	–	5	–
5	CB	Cian Bolger	26	–	1	–	–	–	2	–	–	3	–	–	31	–	1	7	–
6	CB	Fraser Horsfall	37	3	3	1	–	–	2	–	–	4	–	–	44	3	3	6	–
7	AM	Sam Hoskins	44	2	7	1	–	1	1	–	–	1	–	–	47	2	8	6	–
8	CM	Ryan Watson	33	6	8	–	–	–	2	–	1	4	–	–	39	6	9	9	–
10	ST	Alex Jones	4	5	1	–	–	–	–	–	–	–	–	–	4	5	1	–	–
11	W	Ricky Korboa	5	11	2	1	–	–	1	–	–	2	2	–	9	13	2	2	–
12	CM	Scott Pollock	–	–	–	–	–	–	–	–	–	–	–	–	–	–	–	–	–
13	GK	Jonathan Mitchell	35	–	–	1	–	–	1	–	–	5	–	–	42	–	–	3	–
14	W	Mickel Miller	11	1	–	–	–	–	–	–	–	–	–	–	11	1	–	2	–
15	RB	Peter Kioso	21	–	3	–	–	–	–	–	–	–	–	–	21	–	3	6	–
17	CM	Shaun McWilliams	30	2	–	–	–	–	–	–	–	3	1	–	33	3	–	10	1
18	DM	Bryn Morris	19	3	–	–	–	–	–	–	–	–	–	–	19	3	–	5	–
19	W	Morgan Roberts	–	2	–	1	–	–	–	2	–	1	2	–	2	6	–	–	–
22	ST	Benny Ashley-Seal	7	16	–	1	–	–	1	–	–	3	1	3	12	17	3	1	–
23	LB	Joseph Mills	27	–	–	–	–	–	1	–	–	3	–	2	31	–	2	5	–
26	ST	Ryan Edmondson	13	8	2	–	–	–	–	–	–	–	–	–	13	8	2	3	–
28	CB	Lloyd Jones	27	–	–	–	–	–	–	–	–	–	–	–	27	–	–	4	–
29	ST	Danny Rose	23	16	4	–	1	–	–	–	–	4	–	1	27	17	5	5	–
30	ST	Caleb Chukwuemeka	2	20	1	1	–	–	1	–	–	–	4	1	4	24	2	2	–
31	ST	Ethan Johnston	–	–	–	–	–	–	–	1	–	–	–	–	–	1	–	–	–
32	CB	Max Dyche	1	1	–	–	–	–	–	–	–	–	–	–	1	1	–	–	–
34	MF	Liam Cross	–	1	–	–	–	–	–	–	–	–	–	–	–	1	–	–	–
44	CB	Alan Sheehan	12	2	1	–	–	–	–	–	–	1	–	–	13	2	1	2	–
45	W	Mark Marshall	18	11	1	1	–	–	–	1	–	2	–	1	21	12	2	1	–
Out on loan:
9	ST	Harry Smith	13	3	3	–	1	–	1	–	1	2	1	–	16	4	4	1	–
20	AM	Matt Warburton	4	–	1	–	–	–	1	–	1	1	–	–	6	–	2	2	–
Players no longer at club:
3	LB	Joe Martin	5	1	–	1	–	–	1	–	–	2	1	–	9	2	–	2	2
10	W	Nicky Adams	10	4	–	–	–	–	–	–	–	2	–	–	12	4	–	–	–
14	CM	Chris Lines	1	3	1	–	–	–	–	2	–	2	2	–	3	7	1	1	–
15	CB	Luka Racic	4	2	–	1	–	–	2	–	–	1	–	–	8	2	–	2	–
21	W	Ricky Holmes	5	4	1	–	1	–	–	–	–	1	–	–	6	4	1	1	–
24	ST	Joe Nuttall	–	1	–	–	–	–	–	–	–	–	–	–	–	1	–	–	–
26	LB	Jacob Ballinger	–	–	–	–	–	–	–	–	–	–	–	–	–	–	–	–	–
27	DM	Christopher Missilou	11	4	1	1	–	–	2	–	–	1	1	–	15	5	1	3	–

== Transfers ==
=== Transfers in ===
Date from	Position	Nationality	Name	From	Fee	Ref.
27 July 2020	DM	(Republic of the Congo)	Christopher Missilou	(England) Oldham Athletic	Free transfer	
8 August 2020	LB	(England)	Joseph Mills	(England) Forest Green Rovers	Free transfer	
14 August 2020	CB	(England)	Fraser Horsfall	(England) Macclesfield Town	Free transfer	
21 August 2020	CB	(Republic of Ireland)	Cian Bolger	(England) Lincoln City	Free transfer	
1 September 2020	CF	(England)	Ricky Korboa	(England) Carshalton Athletic	Undisclosed	
7 September 2020	CF	(England)	Benny Ashley-Seal	(England) Wolverhampton Wanderers	Undisclosed	
18 September 2020	CM	(England)	Jack Sowerby	(England) Fleetwood Town	Undisclosed	
2 October 2020	CF	(England)	Danny Rose	(England) Mansfield Town	Undisclosed	
27 October 2020	CB	(Republic of Ireland)	Alan Sheehan	Unattached	Free transfer	
2 November 2020	W	(England)	Ricky Holmes	Unattached	Free transfer	
29 December 2020	CB	(England)	Lloyd Jones	Unattached	Free transfer	
2 March 2021	ST	(England)	Alex Jones	Unattached	Free transfer	

=== Loans in ===
Date from	Position	Nationality	Name	From	Until	Ref.
4 August 2020	GK	(England)	Jonathan Mitchell	(England) Derby County	End of season	
21 August 2020	CB	(Denmark)	Luka Racic	(England) Brentford	3 January 2021	
31 August 2020	CF	(England)	Joe Nuttall	(England) Blackpool	End of season	
14 January 2021	CF	(England)	Ryan Edmondson	(England) Leeds United	End of season	
14 January 2021	CF	(England)	Mickel Miller	(England) Rotherham United	End of season	
18 January 2021	DM	(England)	Bryn Morris	(England) Portsmouth	End of season	
25 January 2021	RB	(Republic of Ireland)	Peter Kioso	(England) Luton Town	End of season	

=== Loans out ===
Date from	Position	Nationality	Name	To	Until	Ref.
26 September 2020	DF	(England)	Jacob Ballinger	(England) St Ives Town	October 2021	
26 September 2020	FW	(England)	Ethan Johnston	(England) Redditch United	October 2021	
8 October 2020	SS	(England)	Matty Warburton	(England) Yeovil Town	End of season	
12 December 2020	FW	(England)	Ethan Johnston	(England) Kettering Town	January 2021	
12 December 2020	AM	(England)	Morgan Roberts	(England) Brackley Town	January 2021	
21 January 2021	CF	(England)	Harry Smith	(Scotland) Motherwell	End of season	

=== Transfers out ===
Date from	Position	Nationality	Name	To	Fee	Ref.
2 July 2020	AM	(England)	Paul Anderson	Free agent	Released	
2 July 2020	GK	(Wales)	David Cornell	(England) Ipswich Town	Released	
2 July 2020	RB	(England)	Reece Hall-Johnson	(Wales) Wrexham	Released	
2 July 2020	CB	(England)	Ryan Hughes	(England) AFC Rushden & Diamonds	Released	
2 July 2020	GK	(England)	Bradley Lashley	(England) Cogenhoe United	Released	
2 July 2020	CM	(Republic of Ireland)	Alan McCormack	(England) Southend United	Released	
2 July 2020	RB	(England)	Camron McWilliams	(Wales) Cardiff City U23s	Released	
2 July 2020	CM	(England)	Jack Newell	Free agent	Released	
2 July 2020	CB	(England)	Jordan Turnbull	(England) Salford City	Released	
2 July 2020	CF	(England)	Billy Waters	(England) Torquay United	Released	
2 July 2020	CF	(England)	Andy Williams	(England) Cheltenham Town	Released	
2 July 2020	CB	(England)	Jay Williams	(England) Wealdstone	Released	
2 July 2020	RM	(England)	Sean Whaler	Free agent	Released	
5 August 2020	CF	(England)	Vadaine Oliver	(England) Gillingham	Rejected Contract	
19 August 2020	CB	(England)	Charlie Goode	(England) Brentford	£1,000,000+	
29 December 2020	LB	(England)	Jacob Ballinger	Free agent	Released	
5 January 2021	CM	(England)	Chris Lines	(England) Stevenage	Undisclosed	
22 January 2021	RM	(Wales)	Nicky Adams	(England) Oldham Athletic	Undisclosed	
29 January 2021	LB	(England)	Joe Martin	(England) Stevenage	Undisclosed	
1 February 2021	DM	(Republic of the Congo)	Christopher Missilou	(England) Swindon Town	Undisclosed	
18 February 2021	LW	(England)	Ricky Holmes	(England) Southend United	Free transfer	
