= Fraser Horsfall =

English footballer (born 1996)

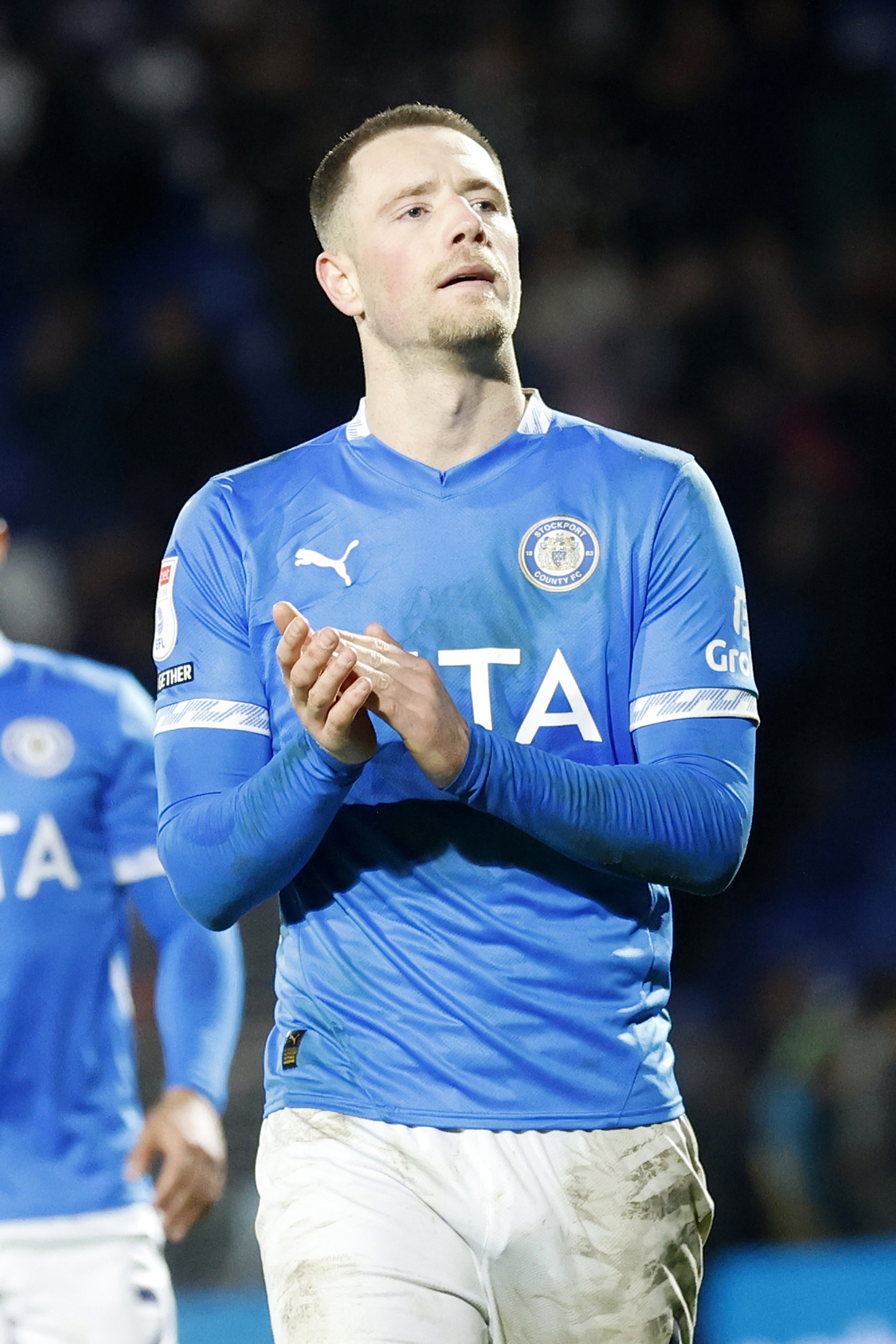
- Horsfall in 2024

Personal information
- Full name: Fraser Matthew Horsfall
- Date of birth: 12 November 1996 (age 29)
- Place of birth: Huddersfield, England
- Height: 6 ft 3 in (1.90 m)
- Position: Centre-back

Team information
- Current team: Blackpool
- Number: 5

Youth career
- 2004–2016: Huddersfield Town

Senior career*
Years	Team	Apps	(Gls)
2016–2017	Huddersfield Town	0	(0)
2016	→ Trafford (loan)		
2017	→ Stalybridge Celtic (loan)	5	(1)
2017	→ Salford City (loan)	4	(1)
2017	→ Gateshead (loan)	0	(0)
2017	→ Kidderminster Harriers (loan)	16	(1)
2017–2019	Kidderminster Harriers	60	(5)
2019–2020	Macclesfield Town	26	(0)
2020–2022	Northampton Town	85	(12)
2022–2025	Stockport County	106	(6)
2025–	Blackpool	25	(0)

International career
2018	England C	2	(0)
- * Club domestic league appearances and goals as of 12:32, 28 October 2026 (UTC)

Fraser Matthew Horsfall (born 12 November 1996) is an English professional footballer who plays as a centre-back for Blackpool.

== Career ==
Born in Huddersfield, Horsfall began his senior career at Huddersfield Town, having graduated through the academy at the club after joining in 2004. Horsfall was subsequently sent out on loan to Trafford, Stalybridge Celtic, Salford City and Gateshead, before signing on loan for Kidderminster Harriers. In December 2017, after 16 National League North appearances, Horsfall joined Kidderminster on a permanent deal. During his time at Kidderminster, Horsfall was called up to the England C squad twice. In July 2019, Horsfall signed for Football League club Macclesfield Town. He signed for Northampton Town in August 2020.

In June 2022 it was announced that he would sign for Stockport County on a free transfer on 1 July 2022.

On 20 May 2025, the club announced it had offered the player a new contract. He declined this offer, instead opting to sign for Blackpool. The deal, a four-year contract, was completed on 1 July.

== Personal life ==
During his youth footballing career, Horsfall played youth cricket in his hometown of Halifax for Sowerby Bridge Church Institute.

== Career statistics ==
As of match played 27 October 2026

Appearances and goals by club, season and competition
Club	Season	League			FA Cup		League Cup		Other		Total	
Club	Season	Division	Apps	Goals	Apps	Goals	Apps	Goals	Apps	Goals	Apps	Goals
Huddersfield Town	2016–17	Championship	0	0	0	0	0	0	0	0	0	0
Huddersfield Town	2017–18	Premier League	0	0	0	0	0	0	0	0	0	0
Huddersfield Town	Total		0	0	0	0	0	0	0	0	0	0
Stalybridge Celtic (loan)	2016–17	National League North	5	1	0	0	—		0	0	5	1
Salford City (loan)	2016–17	National League North	4	1	0	0	—		0	0	4	1
Gateshead (loan)	2017–18	National League	0	0	0	0	—		0	0	0	0
Kidderminster Harriers (loan)	2017–18	National League North	15	1	2	0	—		1 (Note: Appearance(s) in FA Trophy)	0	18	1
Kidderminster Harriers	2017–18	National League North	19	2	0	0	—		2	1	21	3
Kidderminster Harriers	2018–19	National League North	42	3	0	0	—		0	0	42	3
Kidderminster Harriers	Total		61	5	0	0	0	0	2	1	63	6
Macclesfield Town	2019–20	League Two	26	0	0	0	2	0	3 (Note: Appearance(s) in EFL Trophy)	0	31	0
Northampton Town	2020–21	League One	40	3	1	0	2	0	4	0	47	3
Northampton Town	2021–22	League Two	45	9	2	0	2	0	4 (Note: Two appearances in EFL Trophy, two appearances in play-offs)	0	53	9
Northampton Town	Total		85	12	3	0	4	0	8	0	100	12
Stockport County	2022–23	League Two	32	2	2	0	0	0	4 (Note: One appearance in EFL Trophy, three appearances in play-offs)	0	38	2
Stockport County	2023–24	League Two	45	2	2	0	1	0	0	0	48	2
Stockport County	2024–25	League One	29	2	2	1	0	0	5 (Note: Three appearances in EFL Trophy, two appearances and one goal in play-offs)	1	36	4
Stockport County	Total		106	6	6	1	1	0	9	1	122	8
Blackpool	2025–26	League One	25	0	2	0	0	0	3	0	30	0
Blackpool	2026–27	League One	0	0	0	0	0	0	1	0	1	0
Blackpool	Total		25	0	2	0	0	0	4	0	31	0
Career total			327	26	13	1	7	0	27	2	374	29

== Honours ==
Stockport County

- EFL League Two: 2023–24

Individual

- PFA Team of the Year: 2021–22 League Two, 2023–24 League Two
- EFL League Two Team of the Season: 2023–24
