= Shaun McWilliams =

English footballer

Personal information
- Full name: Shaun Daniel McWilliams
- Date of birth: 14 August 1998 (age 28)
- Place of birth: Northampton, England
- Height: 1.80 m (5 ft 11 in)
- Position: Midfielder

Team information
- Current team: Cheltenham Town
- Number: 17

Youth career
- –2016: Northampton Town

Senior career*
Years	Team	Apps	(Gls)
2016–2024	Northampton Town	200	(6)
2016–2017	→ King's Lynn Town (loan)	26	(7)
2024–2026	Rotherham United	50	(2)
2026–	Cheltenham Town	10	(0)
- * Club domestic league appearances and goals as of 16:19, 22 November 2026(UTC)

Shaun Daniel McWilliams (born 14 August 1998) is an English footballer who plays as a midfielder for EFL League Two side Cheltenham Town.

== Career ==
Having come through the youth academy at Northampton Town, McWilliams had his first taste of senior football when, in August 2016, he joined Southern League Premier Division side King's Lynn Town on a youth-loan deal.

McWilliams made his debut for Northampton Town on 1 April 2017 in a 1–1 draw away at Rochdale. He came off of the bench aged just 18 in the 61' minute of the match, replacing John-Joe O'Toole. Following five first-team appearances at the end of the 2016–17 season, McWilliams signed a new three-year contract with the club on 29 September 2017 after impressing manager Jimmy Floyd Hasselbaink. McWilliams would feature 19 times in the league during the 2017–18 season as Northampton were relegated to League Two after two seasons back in the third tier, McWilliams featuring on the final day of the season as a 2–2 draw with Oldham Athletic, a result that saw relegation confirmed for both sides.

On 21 September 2019, he scored his first professional goal in a 2–2 draw with Crawley Town. In November 2019 he underwent surgery on his appendix. On Boxing Day 2019, McWilliams was stretchered off in a 4–0 defeat to Crawley Town, an injury that would keep him out for the rest of the season which ended in success for the Cobblers as they secured promotion back to the third tier with a 4–0 play-off final victory over Exeter City.

On 17 July 2026, McWilliams signed for EFL League Two club Cheltenham Town following his departure from Rotherham United at the end of the 2025–26 season.

== Personal life ==
McWilliams' brother Camron is also a footballer who came through the youth system at Northampton too before moving to Cardiff City.

== Career statistics ==
As of match played 21 November 2026

Appearances and goals by club, season and competition
Club	Season	League			FA Cup		League Cup		Other		Total	
Club	Season	Division	Apps	Goals	Apps	Goals	Apps	Goals	Apps	Goals	Apps	Goals
Northampton Town	2016–17	League One	5	0	0	0	0	0	0	0	5	0
Northampton Town	2017–18	League One	19	0	2	0	0	0	1 (Note: Appearance(s) in the EFL Trophy.)	0	22	0
Northampton Town	2018–19	League Two	25	0	1	0	0	0	3	0	29	0
Northampton Town	2019–20	League Two	17	1	0	0	1	0	4	0	22	1
Northampton Town	2020–21	League One	32	0	0	0	0	0	4	0	36	0
Northampton Town	2021–22	League Two	36	0	2	0	1	0	4 (Note: Appearances in League Two play-offs)	0	43	0
Northampton Town	2022–23	League Two	30	3	1	0	1	0	1	0	33	3
Northampton Town	2023–24	League One	36	2	1	0	0	0	2	1	39	3
Northampton Town	Total		200	6	7	0	3	0	19	1	229	7
King's Lynn Town (loan)	2016–17	Southern League Premier	26	7	0	0	—		3 (Note: Appearance(s) in FA Trophy)	0	29	7
Rotherham United	2024–25	League One	24	0	0	0	2	0	5	1	31	1
Rotherham United	2025–26	League One	26	2	1	0	2	0	4	1	33	3
Rotherham United	Total		50	2	1	0	4	0	9	2	64	4
Cheltenham Town	2026–27	League Two	10	0	1	0	1	0	1	0	13	0
Career total			286	15	9	0	8	0	32	3	335	18

== Honours ==
Northampton Town

- EFL League Two play-offs: 2020
- EFL League Two promotion: 2022–23
