= Jack Sowerby =

English footballer (born 1995)

Personal information
- Full name: Jack Anthony Charles William Sowerby
- Date of birth: 23 March 1995 (age 31)
- Place of birth: Preston, England
- Height: 5 ft 9 in (1.75 m)
- Position: Midfielder

Youth career
- 2012–2013: Preston North End

Senior career*
Years	Team	Apps	(Gls)
2013–2014	Squires Gate		
2014–2020	Fleetwood Town	77	(3)
2018–2019	→ Carlisle United (loan)	25	(4)
2020–2025	Northampton Town	140	(2)
- * Club domestic league appearances and goals as of 23:37, 16 November 2024 (UTC)

Jack Anthony Charles William Sowerby (born 23 March 1995) is an English professional footballer.

== Career ==
Sowerby played youth team football for Preston North End, joining North West Counties League side Squires Gate in 2013. After impressing on a trial basis, he signed with League One side Fleetwood Town in November 2014. He made his debut in the Football League on 22 August 2015, coming on as a late substitute for Antoni Sarcevic in a 4–0 win over Colchester United at Highbury Stadium. He scored his first goal for Fleetwood in a 2–0 win over Peterborough United on 15 October 2016.

Fleetwood exercised a one-year contract extension for him at the end of the 2017–18 season.

On 6 May 2025, Northampton announced the player would leave in June when his contract expired.

== Career statistics ==
As of match played 16 November 2024

Appearances and goals by club, season and competition
Club	Season	League			FA Cup		League Cup		Other		Total	
Club	Season	Division	Apps	Goals	Apps	Goals	Apps	Goals	Apps	Goals	Apps	Goals
Fleetwood Town	2015–16	League One	8	0	0	0	0	0	0	0	8	0
Fleetwood Town	2016–17	League One	8	1	3	0	0	0	1 (Note: Appearances in the EFL Trophy)	1	12	2
Fleetwood Town	2017–18	League One	22	2	2	1	0	0	1	0	25	3
Fleetwood Town	2018–19	League One	15	0	0	0	0	0	0	0	15	0
Fleetwood Town	2019–20	League One	24	0	2	0	0	0	4	1	30	1
Fleetwood Town	Total		77	3	7	1	0	0	6	2	90	6
Carlisle United (loan)	2018–19	League Two	25	4	2	0	1	0	1	1	29	5
Northampton Town	2020–21	League One	28	0	0	0	0	0	3	0	31	0
Northampton Town	2021–22	League Two	34	1	1	0	0	0	3 (Note: Appearances in League Two play-offs)	0	38	1
Northampton Town	2022–23	League Two	38	1	1	0	0	0	0	0	39	1
Northampton Town	2023–24	League One	32	0	1	0	1	0	1	0	35	0
Northampton Town	2024–25	League One	10	0	1	0	0	0	1	0	12	0
Northampton Town	Total		140	2	4	0	1	0	8	0	153	2
Career total			240	9	13	1	2	0	15	3	269	13

== Honours ==
Northampton Town

- EFL League Two promotion: 2022–23
