= Benny Ashley-Seal =

English footballer

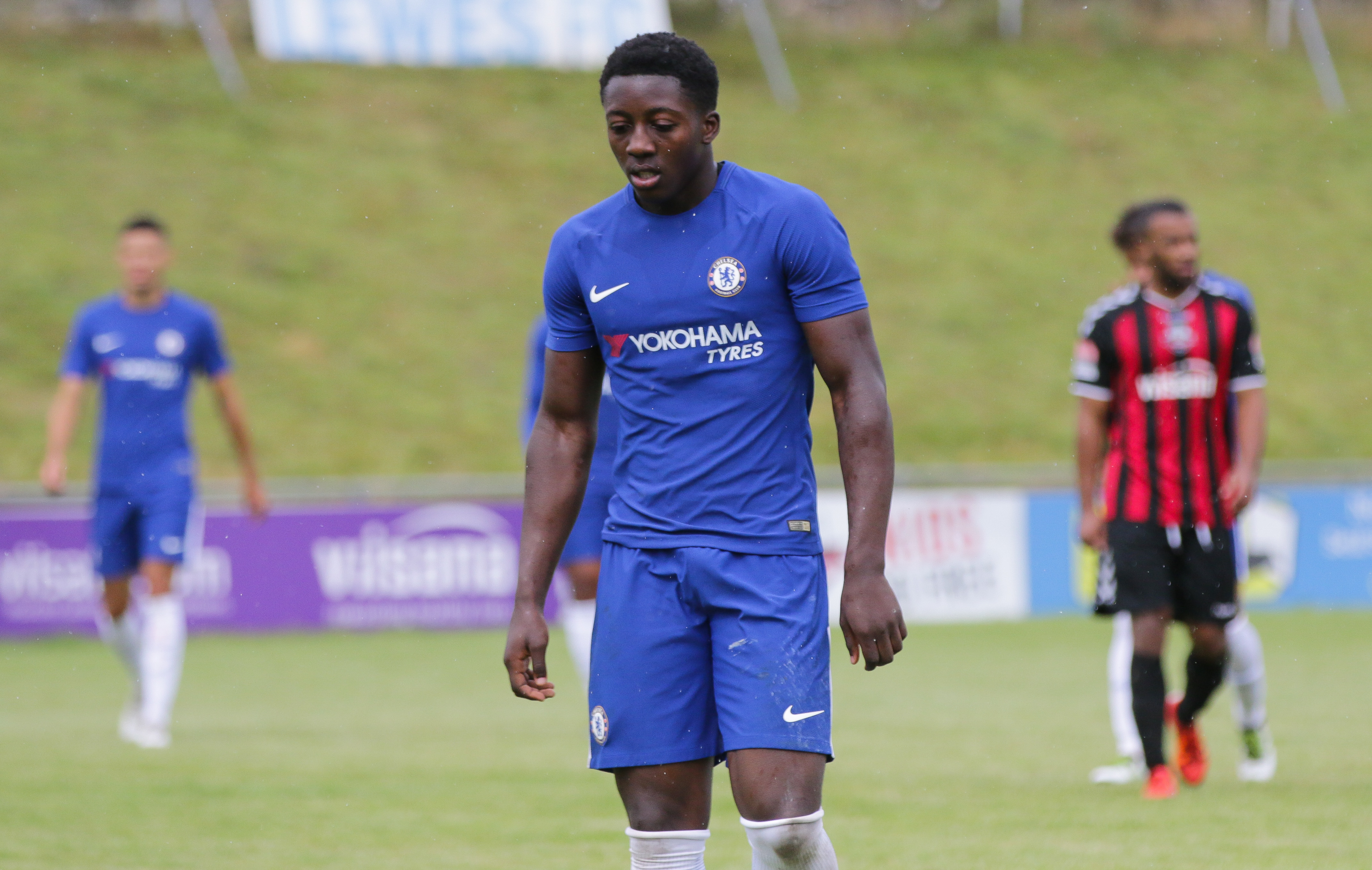

Personal information
- Full name: Bernard Patrick Ashley-Seal
- Date of birth: 21 November 1998 (age 27)
- Place of birth: Southwark, England
- Position: Striker

Youth career
- Arsenal
- Tottenham Hotspur
- 2015–2017: Norwich City
- 2017–2018: Wolverhampton Wanderers

Senior career*
Years	Team	Apps	(Gls)
2018–2020	Wolverhampton Wanderers	0	(0)
2019	→ Famalicão (loan)	5	(1)
2020	→ Accrington Stanley (loan)	5	(0)
2020–2022	Northampton Town	32	(2)
2022–2023	KTP	7	(0)
2023	Hamilton Academical	8	(1)
- * Club domestic league appearances and goals as of 11 June 2024

Bernard Patrick Ashley-Seal (born 21 November 1998) is an English professional footballer who last played as a striker for Scottish League One club Hamilton Academical.

== Career ==
=== Early career ===
Ashley-Seal was on the books at Arsenal and Tottenham Hotspur before joining Norwich's academy in 2015. In October 2015, he was named by The Guardian as one of the top twenty prospects of his age group to look out for. Despite this, he did not sign a professional contract with the club and, despite reported interest from Leicester City, instead had trials with Chelsea and Stoke.

In October 2017 he signed with Wolverhampton Wanderers on a two-an-a-half-year deal. He made his professional debut for the club on 28 August 2018 in a 2–0 League Cup victory at Sheffield Wednesday, coming on as a substitute in the 80th minute for Léo Bonatini. He made a further appearance as a substitute in the following round of the competition against Leicester, in which he was the only Wolves player to successfully convert his penalty in a shootout.

On 23 January 2019, having signed a new three-and-a-half-year contract with Wolves, the striker joined LigaPro side Famalicão on loan until the end of the 2018–19 season.

Ashley-Seal made his first start for Wolves on 4 January 2020 in a third round FA Cup tie against Manchester United at Molineux, although he was withdrawn at half-time in favour of Raúl Jiménez., this was to be final appearance for the club. At the end of the month, he moved in a six-month loan deal to League One club Accrington Stanley.

=== Northampton Town ===
On 7 September 2020, Ashley-Seal joined League One side Northampton Town on a two-year deal for an undisclosed fee. He scored his first goals for Northampton when he scored twice in an EFL Trophy tie against Southampton U21s on 6 October 2020.

=== KTP ===
On 26 July 2022, Ashley-Seal signed for Finnish club KTP.

=== Hamilton Academical ===
On March 18, 2023, Ashley-Seal joined Hamilton Academical on a contract till end of the season.

== Career statistics ==
As of 8 August 2021

Appearances and goals by club, season and competition
Club	Season	League			National Cup		League Cup		Other		Total	
Club	Season	Division	Apps	Goals	Apps	Goals	Apps	Goals	Apps	Goals	Apps	Goals
Wolverhampton Wanderers	2018–19	Premier League	0	0	0	0	2	0	0	0	2	0
Wolverhampton Wanderers	2019–20	Premier League	0	0	1	0	1	0	0	0	2	0
Wolverhampton Wanderers	Total		0	0	1	0	3	0	0	0	4	0
Wolverhampton Wanderers U23	2018–19	—			—		—		3 (Note: Appearance(s) in the EFL Trophy.)	1	3	1
Wolverhampton Wanderers U23	2019–20	—			—		—		3	3	3	3
Wolverhampton Wanderers U23	Total		0	0	0	0	0	0	6	4	6	4
Famalicão (loan)	2018–19	LigaPro	5	1	0	0	0	0	0	0	5	1
Accrington Stanley (loan)	2019–20	League One	5	0	0	0	0	0	0	0	5	0
Northampton Town	2020–21	League One	23	0	1	0	1	0	4	3	29	3
Northampton Town	2021–22	League Two	9	2	1	0	0	0	3	0	13	2
Northampton Town	Total		32	2	2	0	1	0	7	3	42	5
KTP	2022	Ykkönen	7	0	0	0	–		–		7	0
Hamilton Academical	2022–23	Scottish Championship	8	1	0	0	1	0	–		9	1
Career total			57	4	3	0	5	0	13	7	78	11

== Honours ==
Hamilton Academical

- Scottish Challenge Cup: 2022–23
