= Scott Pollock =

English footballer (born 2001)

Scott Henry Alexander Pollock
Personal information
- Full name: Scott Henry Alexander Gladman Pollock
- Date of birth: 12 March 2001 (age 25)
- Place of birth: Northampton, England
- Height: 1.84 m (6 ft 0 in)
- Position: Midfielder

Team information
- Current team: Oxford City

Youth career
- –2016: Northampton Town
- 2017–2018: Hashtag United
- 2018: Northampton Town

Senior career*
Years	Team	Apps	(Gls)
2017–2018	Hashtag United	0	(0)
2018–2022	Northampton Town	18	(1)
2019	→ St Neots Town (loan)	9	(0)
2022	→ Boston United (loan)	5	(2)
2022–2023	Boston United	27	(14)
2023–2024	Yeovil Town	7	(0)
2024–2026	Brackley Town	63	(5)
2026–	Oxford City	10	(6)
- * Club domestic league appearances and goals as of 10:52, 19 October 2026 (UTC)

Scott Alexander Gladman Pollock (born 12 March 2001) is an English professional footballer who plays as a midfielder for National League North club Oxford City.

== Career ==
Pollock began his career with Northampton Town, featuring in the club's youth Football & Education Programme having joined as an under-14. In 2017, Pollock began playing for the then Sunday League team Hashtag United after winning their nationwide academy competition in May. He subsequently appeared at the EE Wembley Cup later that year, a competition in which he won man of the match and was subsequently handed a trial at Crystal Palace. They did not sign Pollock though, stating he was "too slight".

Pollock, before playing for Hashtag United, had a trial with Leicester City.

On 14 September 2018, Pollock signed a two-year contract with Northampton Town. Two weeks later, he was selected as a substitute in a League Two fixture against Mansfield Town. In January 2019, Pollock was sent out on loan to St Neots Town. He was recalled following two appearances. Pollock subsequently made his professional league debut on 19 January against Cambridge United. In the succeeding February, Pollock rejoined St Neots Town on loan. He was again recalled in April after seven games.

Pollock started in League Two for the first time on 13 April as Northampton drew 1–1 with Mansfield Town. He assisted Sam Foley's goal.

On 22 October 2019, Pollock netted his first goal in a 2–0 away win over Carlisle United; scoring in the 51st minute.

On 26 February 2022, Pollock joined National League North side Boston United on a one-month loan deal. He made his debut that day and opened the scoring just ten minutes in as his side defeated Kettering Town 3–2. He was recalled in March 2022. In June 2022, following his release from Northampton Town, Pollock joined Boston United on a permanent basis.

On 6 March 2023, Pollock signed with Yeovil Town in the National League South. On 12 April 2024, Pollock departed Yeovil Town after the mutual termination of his contract, having not featured during the 2023–24 season.

In June 2024, Pollock signed for National League North side Brackley Town. He scored 12 goals in 79 apps during his time with the Saints

On 19 June 2026, Pollock joined Oxford City in the National League North following Brackley Town's relegation. Pollock made his City debut against Spalding United on 15th August 2026.

== Career statistics ==
As of end of 2025–26 season

Appearances and goals by club, season and competition
Club	Season	League			FA Cup		EFL Cup		Other		Total	
Club	Season	Division	Apps	Goals	Apps	Goals	Apps	Goals	Apps	Goals	Apps	Goals
Northampton Town	2018–19	League Two	5	0	0	0	0	0	0	0	5	0
Northampton Town	2019–20	League Two	11	1	4	0	0	0	3 (Note: Appearance(s) in the EFL Trophy.)	0	18	1
Northampton Town	2020–21	League One	0	0	0	0	0	0	0	0	0	0
Northampton Town	2021–22	League Two	2	0	0	0	1	0	3	1	6	1
Northampton Town	Total		18	1	4	0	1	0	6	1	29	2
St Neots Town (loan)	2018–19	Southern League; Premier Division Central	9	0	0	0	—		0	0	9	0
Boston United (loan)	2021–22	National League North	5	2	0	0	—		0	0	5	2
Boston United	2022–23	National League North	27	14	3	2	—		2 (Note: One appearance in FA Trophy, one appearance in Lincolnshire Senior Cup.)	0	32	16
Boston United	Total		32	16	3	2	—		2	0	37	18
Yeovil Town	2022–23	National League	7	0	—		—		—		7	0
Yeovil Town	2023–24	National League South	0	0	0	0	—		0	0	0	0
Yeovil Town	Total		7	0	0	0	—		0	0	7	0
Brackley Town	2024–25	National League North	28	4	5	3	—		1 (Note: Appearance in NFA Hillier Senior Cup)	3	34	10
Brackley Town	2025–26	National League	35	1	4	1	—		5 (Note: Two appearances in FA Trophy, three appearances in National League Cup)	0	44	2
Brackley Town	Total		63	5	9	4	—		6	3	78	12
Career total			129	22	16	6	1	0	14	4	165	32

== Honours ==
Brackley Town:

- National League North: 2024–25

Individual

- Northampton Town Young Player of the Season: 2018–19
- EFL League Two Apprentice of the Year: 2020
