= Ali Koiki =

English footballer (born 1999)

Personal information
- Full name: Abd-Al-Ali Morakinyo Olaposi Koiki
- Date of birth: 22 August 1999 (age 27)
- Place of birth: Kensington, England
- Height: 1.87 m (6 ft 2 in)
- Position: Left back

Team information
- Current team: Eastleigh

Youth career
- Crystal Palace
- Kinetic Academy
- 2016–2018: Burnley

Senior career*
Years	Team	Apps	(Gls)
2018–2020	Burnley	0	(0)
2019	→ Swindon Town (loan)	15	(0)
2020–2021	Bristol Rovers	10	(0)
2021–2025	Northampton Town	80	(1)
2026–	Eastleigh	0	(0)
- * Club domestic league appearances and goals as of 21:55, 16 October 2026 (UTC)

Abd-Al-Ali Morakinyo Olaposi Koiki (born 22 August 1999) is an English professional footballer who plays as a left back for National League club Eastleigh.

== Career ==
Born in Kensington, London, Koiki began his career in the youth team of Crystal Palace before being released at the age of eleven. He later moved to Burnley in the summer of 2016 following a trial, after he had been spotted playing local football for Kinetic Academy, in Croydon. He signed his first professional contract at the end of the 2017–18 campaign having moved up to the development squad at the start of the season. He moved on loan to League Two side Swindon Town in January 2019 until the end of the season. He made his professional debut on 12 January 2019 replacing Matthew Taylor as a substitute in the 2–2 draw with Lincoln City.

He was offered a new contract by Burnley at the end of the 2019–20 season, but rejected the offer and left the club.

=== Bristol Rovers ===
On 22 October 2020 he joined League One side Bristol Rovers. Koiki made his debut for the club on 3 November 2020, coming off of the bench in the 65' minute of a 2–0 defeat to Peterborough United and made his full debut that weekend in an FA Cup victory over Walsall. Koiki scored his first professional goal with the opener in a 2–1 EFL Trophy victory over Leyton Orient on 8 December 2020. At the end of the season it was announced that Koiki would not be having his contract renewed and would leave the club after just a year.

=== Northampton Town ===
On 23 July 2021, Koiki joined recently relegated League Two side Northampton Town on a one-year contract after impressing on trial. Koiki remained at Northampton and signed a two-year contract in June 2023.

On 6 May 2025, Northampton announced the player would leave in June when his contract expired.

=== Eastleigh ===
On 16 October 2026, after over a year without a club, Koiki joined National League side Eastleigh on a short-term deal.

== Personal life ==
Koiki is of Nigerian descent.

== Career statistics ==
As of match played 15 March 2025

Appearances and goals by club, season and competition
Club	Season	League			FA Cup		EFL Cup		Other		Total	
Club	Season	Division	Apps	Goals	Apps	Goals	Apps	Goals	Apps	Goals	Apps	Goals
Burnley	2018–19	Premier League	0	0	0	0	0	0	0	0	0	0
Burnley	2019–20	Premier League	0	0	0	0	0	0	0	0	0	0
Burnley	Total		0	0	0	0	0	0	0	0	0	0
Swindon Town (loan)	2018–19	League Two	15	0	0	0	0	0	0	0	15	0
Bristol Rovers	2020–21	League One	10	0	1	0	0	0	2 (Note: Appearances in the EFL Trophy)	1	13	1
Northampton Town	2021–22	League Two	42	0	2	0	2	0	4 (Note: Two appearances in the EFL Trophy; two appearances and one goal in the League Two play-offs)	1	50	1
Northampton Town	2022–23	League Two	22	0	0	0	1	0	1	0	24	0
Northampton Town	2023–24	League One	11	1	1	0	1	0	1	0	14	1
Northampton Town	2024–25	League One	5	0	0	0	0	0	0	0	5	0
Northampton Town	Total		80	1	3	0	4	0	6	1	93	2
Career total			105	1	4	0	4	0	8	2	121	3

== Honours ==
Northampton Town

- EFL League Two promotion: 2022–23
