= Sam Hoskins =

English footballer (born 1993)

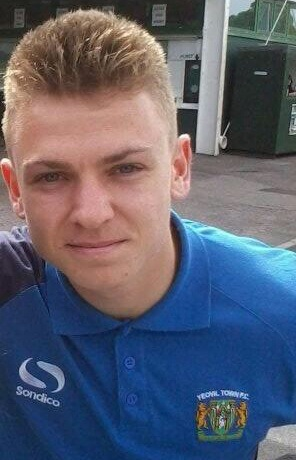
- Hoskins in 2014

Personal information
- Full name: Samuel Tobias Hoskins
- Date of birth: 4 February 1993 (age 33)
- Place of birth: Dorchester, England
- Height: 5 ft 8 in (1.73 m)
- Positions: Attacking midfielder; wing-back

Team information
- Current team: Northampton Town
- Number: 7

Youth career
- 1999–2005: Oakwood Rangers
- 2005–2011: Southampton

Senior career*
Years	Team	Apps	(Gls)
2011–2013	Southampton	0	(0)
2011	→ Preston North End (loan)	0	(0)
2012	→ Rotherham United (loan)	8	(2)
2013	→ Stevenage (loan)	14	(1)
2013–2015	Yeovil Town	31	(1)
2014	→ Barnet (loan)	6	(2)
2015–	Northampton Town	424	(95)
- * Club domestic league appearances and goals as of 12 November 2026 (UTC)

Samuel Tobias Hoskins (born 4 February 1993) is an English professional footballer who plays as an attacking midfielder for EFL League Two club Northampton Town.

Hoskins was born in Dorchester, Dorset and began his career at Southampton, joining the club as a trainee in 2005; signing his first professional contract six years later. After making his first-team debut for Southampton in August 2011, Hoskins was loaned out to Preston North End three months later, although he made no appearances due to injury. He was loaned out once again in March 2012, signing for Rotherham United of League Two for the remainder of the 2011–12 campaign. Hoskins was loaned out for a third time in January 2013, this time joining League One side Stevenage for the rest of the 2012–13 season. After leaving Southampton in 2013, Hoskins signed for Championship side Yeovil Town on a two-year deal.

== Career ==
=== Southampton ===
Hoskins joined Southampton's youth academy from Oakwood Rangers in 2005, progressing through the ranks and becoming a permanent fixture in the club's youth and reserve sides. He was top goalscorer for Southampton's U18 side for two successive seasons, before repeating the feat the following two years at U21 level, despite being out on loan for significant periods during the season. Hoskins signed his first professional contract in April 2011, signing an initial year-long deal with the option of a further year. In August 2011, Hoskins made his first-team debut for Southampton, coming on as a last minute substitute for Guly do Prado in the club's 3–1 victory over Swindon Town in the League Cup.

==== Preston North End (Loan) ====
In November 2011, Hoskins joined League One side Preston North End on an emergency one-month loan deal, alongside fellow Southampton striker Jonathan Forte. Southampton manager Nigel Adkins hoped the loan move would help Hoskins gain valuable first-team experience. However, he picked up an injury during a training session, and returned to his parent club in December 2011 having made no appearances for Preston. A month later, in January 2012, he made one further first-team appearance for Southampton during the 2011–12 campaign, appearing as a 59th-minute substitute as Southampton came from a goal down to win 2–1 at Coventry City in the FA Cup third round.

==== Rotherham United (Loan) ====
The coaching staff at Southampton believed a loan move would be beneficial to Hoskins' development, and on 15 March 2012, he joined League Two side Rotherham United on loan until the end of the 2011–12 season, with an option to extend the agreement should Rotherham reach the play-offs. He made his debut two days after joining the club, coming on as a substitute in a 2–1 away defeat to Oxford United. Hoskins scored his first professional goal in April 2012, again appearing as a second-half substitute, and netting an 83rd-minute winner in a 2–1 victory at AFC Wimbledon. He earned his first starting appearance in the penultimate game of the season, scoring with a neat chip in a 2–2 draw against Aldershot Town. During the two-month loan spell, Hoskins made eight appearances, scoring two goals.

==== Stevenage (Loan) ====
Hoskins made two substitute appearances for Southampton at the start of the 2012–13, both in League Cup victories. Meanwhile, he continued to impress in the club's U21 development side, leading the overall goalscoring charts in the division with nine goals in twelve games. In January 2013, Hoskins was loaned out for a third time, this time joining League One side Stevenage, on loan for the remainder of the season. He scored his only goal for Stevenage in the club's 2–0 home win over Notts County on 5 February 2013, scoring within the first minute of the match, from close range after Filipe Morais' shot had deflected into his path. He made 14 appearances for the club during the loan agreement before returning to Southampton at the end of the season.

Hoskins was the top scorer for four consecutive years (twice at U18 level and twice at U21 level) and completed two successful loan spells during his first professional term with Southampton. His goal against Newcastle was voted U21 goal of the season. On 4 June 2013, he was released by Southampton.

=== Yeovil Town ===
Hoskins joined newly promoted Championship club Yeovil Town on a two-year deal on 26 June 2013. On 3 August 2013, Hoskins made his debut as a second-half substitute in Yeovil's 1–0 victory over Millwall.

On 19 September 2014, Hoskins joined Conference Premier side Barnet on a short-term loan deal. He made his debut the following day in a 5–0 win over Altrincham, replacing John Akinde, who had already scored a hat-trick, Hoskins scored Barnet's fifth with his first touch to round off the victory. Following the return to fitness of Barnet striker, Charlie MacDonald, Hoskins returned to Yeovil on 27 October 2014 after making seven appearances and scoring twice for Barnet.

On 13 December 2014, Hoskins scored his first Yeovil goal in a 4–0 win over Oldham Athletic.

Hoskins was released by Yeovil at the end of the 2014–15 season following their relegation to League Two.

=== Northampton Town ===
On 1 August 2015, Hoskins signed for Northampton Town on a one-year contract. He scored his first league goal for the club in the 1–0 win over Oxford United in Football League Two on 12 September 2015, with his second goal following the week after, away at Morecambe. Hoskins signed a new two-and-a-half-year contract on 26 February 2016. On 29 June 2020, Hoskins started in the 2020 League Two play-off final at Wembley Stadium and scored the Cobblers' third goal as Northampton won 4–0 against Exeter City to win promotion to League One.

Hoskins won the League Two Player of the Month award for August 2022 after scoring five goals during the month. On 25 March 2023, Hoskins scored his 20th league goal of the season in a win against Doncaster Rovers, becoming the first Northampton player to score 20 league goals in a season since 1986–87. On 23 April 2023, Hoskins won the EFL League Two Player of the Season for the 2022–23 season. He was also named as the Cobblers' Player of the Season. He scored the only goal of the game as Northampton defeated Tranmere Rovers on the final day of the 2022–23 season, securing Northampton's third-place finish and automatic promotion back to League One. Hoskins was named in the League Two PFA Team of the Year for the 2022–23 season. On 30 August 2023, Hoskins signed a new contract with Northampton, committing him with the club until 2026. Hoskins won the League One Player of the Month award for November 2023 after scoring three goals during the month.

On 4 January 2025, Hoskins made his 400th appearance for the Cobblers (only the 4th player in the club's history to do so) in all competitions against Burton Albion. He marked the occasion by scoring his 92nd goal for the club in the 86th minute to win the game.

== Career statistics ==
As of match played 24 October 2026

Appearances and goals by club, season and competition
Club	Season	League			FA Cup		League Cup		Other		Total	
Club	Season	Division	Apps	Goals	Apps	Goals	Apps	Goals	Apps	Goals	Apps	Goals
Southampton	2011–12	Championship	0	0	1	0	1	0	—		2	0
Southampton	2012–13	Premier League	0	0	0	0	2	0	—		2	0
Southampton	Total		0	0	1	0	3	0	—		4	0
Preston North End (loan)	2011–12	League One	0	0	0	0	0	0	0	0	0	0
Rotherham United (loan)	2011–12	League Two	8	2	0	0	0	0	0	0	8	2
Stevenage (loan)	2012–13	League One	14	1	0	0	0	0	0	0	14	1
Yeovil Town	2013–14	Championship	19	0	0	0	2	0	—		21	0
Yeovil Town	2014–15	League One	12	1	0	0	1	0	1 (Note: Appearance(s) in EFL Trophy)	0	14	1
Yeovil Town	Total		31	1	0	0	3	0	1	0	35	1
Barnet (loan)	2014–15	Conference Premier	6	2	1	0	—		0	0	7	2
Northampton Town	2015–16	League Two	34	6	4	1	2	1	2	0	42	8
Northampton Town	2016–17	League One	25	3	2	0	3	0	1	0	31	3
Northampton Town	2017–18	League One	27	2	1	0	0	0	1	0	29	2
Northampton Town	2018–19	League Two	42	5	1	0	1	1	2	1	46	7
Northampton Town	2019–20	League Two	37	8	4	2	1	0	5 (Note: Appearance(s) in EFL League Two play-offs)	2	47	12
Northampton Town	2020–21	League One	46	7	1	1	1	0	1	0	49	8
Northampton Town	2021–22	League Two	44	13	2	0	2	0	4	0	52	13
Northampton Town	2022–23	League Two	41	22	1	0	0	0	0	0	42	22
Northampton Town	2023–24	League One	38	15	1	0	1	0	0	0	40	15
Northampton Town	2024–25	League One	37	7	0	0	1	0	1	0	39	7
Northampton Town	2025–26	League One	42	6	0	0	1	0	5	1	48	7
Northampton Town	2026–27	League Two	10	1	0	0	1	0	2	0	13	1
Northampton Town	Total		423	95	17	4	14	2	24	4	478	105
Career totals			482	101	19	4	20	2	25	4	545	111

== Honours ==
Northampton Town

- Football/EFL League Two: 2015–16; third-place promotion: 2022–23; play-offs: 2020

Individual

- EFL League Two Player of the Season: 2022–23
- EFL League Two Team of the Season: 2022–23
- PFA Team of the Year: 2022–23 League Two
- Northampton Town Player of the Year: 2022–23
