= Liam Cross =

English association football player

Personal information
- Full name: Liam James Cross
- Date of birth: 8 April 2003 (age 23)
- Place of birth: Oxford, England
- Height: 1.82 m (6 ft 0 in)
- Position: Midfielder

Team information
- Current team: Needham Market (on loan from Brackley Town)

Youth career
- –2021: Northampton Town

Senior career*
Years	Team	Apps	(Gls)
2021–2023	Northampton Town	1	(0)
2021	→ St Ives Town (loan)	12	(4)
2021	→ Tamworth (loan)	2	(0)
2022	→ St Ives Town (loan)	13	(1)
2022–2023	→ Leamington (loan)	21	(3)
2023–	Brackley Town	12	(0)
2023–2024	→ Gloucester City (loan)	2	(1)
2024–	→ Needham Market (loan)	0	(0)
- * Club domestic league appearances and goals as of 11:20, 7 December 2024 (UTC)

Liam James Cross (born 8 April 2003) is an English semi-professional footballer who plays as a midfielder for Southern League Premier Division Central club Needham Market, on loan from fellow National League North club Brackley Town.

== Career ==
After graduating through Northampton Town's youth academy, he made his senior debut for the club in the final match of the 2020–21 season as a 79th-minute substitute in a 1–1 draw with Sunderland. Following the end of the season, he was offered a professional contract with the club.

On 13 August 2021, Cross along with teammate Josh Flanagan, signed for St Ives Town on a one-month loan deal.

Cross signed for Southern League Premier Division Central side Tamworth on 29 November 2021 on a one-month loan deal. Cross made his Southern League Premier Central debut for Tamworth on 30 November 2021, starting against Biggleswade Town in an away fixture, Cross was however withdrawn on the 56th minute for Charlie Shaw, following a red card for teammate Jack Thomas, the match finished 2-2.

On 28 January 2022, he returned to St Ives Town on a second month-long loan.

On 24 November 2022, Cross joined National League North side Leamington on a one-month loan deal. He was released by Northampton Town at the end of the 2022–23 season.

On 16 June 2023, Cross signed for National League North club Brackley Town. In November 2023, he joined Gloucester City on loan.
