= Ryan Nolan =

Irish footballer (born 1999)

Personal information
- Full name: Ryan Patrick Nolan
- Date of birth: 17 February 1999 (age 27)
- Place of birth: County Clare, Ireland
- Position: Centre back

Team information
- Current team: Larne
- Number: 19

Youth career
- –2015: Torre Pacheco
- 2015–2018: Inter Milan

Senior career*
Years	Team	Apps	(Gls)
2019–2020	Arezzo	8	(0)
2020	→ Giana Erminio (loan)	1	(0)
2020–2021	Getafe B	4	(0)
2020–2021	Getafe	0	(0)
2022	Northampton Town	0	(0)
2022–2023	Raith Rovers	30	(1)
2023–2024	Hércules	23	(1)
2024-	Larne	48	(1)

International career
2016	Republic of Ireland U16	4	(0)
2016–2017	Republic of Ireland U17	16	(0)
2017–2018	Republic of Ireland U18	5	(0)
- * Club domestic league appearances and goals as of 29 April 2026

Ryan Patrick Nolan (born 17 February 1999) is an Irish professional footballer who plays as a defender for NIFL Premiership side Larne.

== Club career ==
Born in County Clare, Ireland, Nolan was raised in Torre-Pacheco, Spain from a young age. Whilst playing for Torre Pacheco youth team, Nolan was noticed by former player Pierluigi Casiraghi and subsequently recommended to Internazionale.

On 2 September 2019, Nolan left Internazionale and signed with Arezzo. On 31 January 2020, Nolan joined Serie C club Giana Erminio on loan. In the midst of the Coronavirus pandemic, Nolan's contract with Arezzo was terminated by mutual consent on 24 September 2020. He subsequently returned to Spain to join Getafe. Nolan was due to make his first team debut in December 2020 but was ruled out for the season after he tore his cruciate ligament in training.

In February 2022 he signed for Northampton Town.

In August 2022 he signed with Raith Rovers, taking the number 5 shirt.

Nolan made his league debut for Raith Rovers on July 30, 2022, playing the full 90 minutes in an away game against Cove Rangers.

On March 18, 2023, Nolan scored his first league goal in the reverse fixture against Cove Rangers, in a 6–1 home win.

On July 15, 2023, it was announced that Nolan had returned to Spain to play for Hércules.

After helping Hércules to Promotion to the Primera RFEF, including a last minute winner against UD Alzira which kicked off a winning run that included the play off final win to return to the third tier of Spanish football, Nolan signed for Larne FC in the NIFL Premiership.

In the Summer of 2025, Nolan signed a contract extension to remain with Larne, playing in all of their UEFA Conference League qualifiers. Despite keeping a clean sheet away from home against Portuguese Primeira Liga side CD Santa Clara, Larne exited the competition on aggregate.

During the months of August and September 2025, Nolan was an ever present during a six-game run that saw Larne concede zero goals, all of the games ending in wins.

== International career ==
Nolan has represented The Republic of Ireland national team at underage level. He has been capped at U16, U17, and U18 - he has made the provisional U21 squad on one occasion, although he did not make the final squad.

== Honours ==
Larne

- NIFL Premiership 2025-26
