= Caleb Chukwuemeka =

Austrian footballer

Personal information
- Full name: Chigozier Caleb Chukwuemeka
- Date of birth: 25 January 2002 (age 24)
- Place of birth: Eisenstadt, Austria
- Position: Forward

Youth career
- –2020: Northampton Town

Senior career*
Years	Team	Apps	(Gls)
2020–2021	Northampton Town	22	(1)
2020	→ Corby Town (loan)	3	(1)
2021–2023	Aston Villa	0	(0)
2022	→ Livingston (loan)	8	(0)
2022–2023	→ Crawley Town (loan)	10	(0)
2024	Tabor Sežana	8	(2)
2024–2025	AC Bellinzona	10	(1)
- * Club domestic league appearances and goals as of 4 November 2024

Chigoziem Caleb Chukwuemeka (born 25 January 2002) is a professional footballer who plays as a forward. Born in Austria to Nigerian parents, he also holds United Kingdom citizenship.

He is a product of the Northampton Town academy and subsequently was signed for Aston Villa. He later moved to Tabor Sežana and has played on loan at Corby Town, Livingston and Crawley Town during his professional career. He is the older brother of Borussia Dortmund player Carney Chukwuemeka.

== Career ==
=== Northampton Town ===
Chukwuemeka started his career at Northampton Town and joined Corby Town on loan in February 2020, where he made three appearances in the league, scoring once. In July 2020 Chukwuemeka spent a month on trial at Kettering Town playing in three friendly matches. He made his senior debut for Northampton Town on 12 September 2020 as a late substitute in a 2–2 draw with AFC Wimbledon, before starting his first match for the club four days later in a 4–0 EFL Cup defeat to Bristol City. He scored his first goal for Northampton in an EFL Trophy tie against Southampton U21s on 6 October 2020, and scored his first league goal later that month with Northampton's third goal in a 3–2 victory over Wigan Athletic on 31 October.

=== Aston Villa ===
On 16 August 2021, Chukwuemeka signed for Premier League team Aston Villa for an undisclosed fee. He entered their Academy where he was reunited with younger brother Carney. On 24 August 2021, he made his Aston Villa debut, coming on as a substitute for his brother, in a 6–0 EFL Cup victory over Barrow. He was awarded Premier League 2 player of the month for September 2021 - after scoring five goals and providing one assist in three matches in that period.

On 12 January 2022, Chukwuemeka joined Scottish Premiership side Livingston on loan until the end of the season. He made his debut on 18 January 2022, as a second-half substitute in a 2–0 home victory over Dundee. On 22 January, Chukwuemeka was substituted only 7 minutes after entering the field in a match against Aberdeen. Livingston manager David Martindale criticised Chukwuemeka's workrate, but insisted that he still had what it takes to be a success.

On 1 September 2022, Chukwuemeka joined League Two club Crawley Town on a season-long loan with an obligation to buy. He made his debut 2 days later, in a 2–2 draw against Salford City. Despite the transfer being reported as one that would become permanent, Chukwuemeka was included in Aston Villa's retained list at the end of the season.

Chukwuemeka left Aston Villa in 2023, and went on trial at Bristol City in September, though he did not earn a contract.

=== Tabor Sežana ===
In February 2024, he joined Slovenian Second League side Tabor Sežana. He made his debut on 2 March 2024, in a 4–1 defeat to Brinje Grosuplje On 9 March, Chukwuemeka scored his first goals for Tabor, scoring twice in a 3–1 victory over Bilje. He scored twice in 8 league matches for Tabor Sežana.

=== AC Bellinzona ===
In July 2024, Chukwuemeka signed for Swiss Challenge League club AC Bellinzona on a two-year contract. He made his debut for the club on 26 July 2024, where he started against Stade Nyonnais, scoring in the fourth minute as Bellinzona lost 2–1.

== Personal life ==
Chukwuemeka was born in Austria to Nigerian parents. His younger brother Carney plays for Dortmund, they had previously been at both Northampton Town and Aston Villa together.

== Career statistics ==
As of match played on 5 December 2024

Appearances and goals by club, season and competition
Club	Season	League			National Cup		League Cup		Other		Total	
Club	Season	Division	Apps	Goals	Apps	Goals	Apps	Goals	Apps	Goals	Apps	Goals
Northampton Town	2019–20	League Two	0	0	0	0	0	0	0	0	0	0
Northampton Town	2020–21	League One	22	1	1	0	1	0	4 (Note: Appearance(s) in EFL Trophy)	1	28	2
Northampton Town	Total		22	1	1	0	1	0	4	1	28	2
Corby Town (loan)	2019–20	Southern League Division One Central	3	1	0	0	—		0	0	3	1
Aston Villa U21	2021–22	—			—		—		2	0	2	0
Aston Villa	2021–22	Premier League	0	0	0	0	1	0	0	0	1	0
Aston Villa	2022–23	Premier League	0	0	0	0	0	0	0	0	0	0
Aston Villa	Total		0	0	0	0	1	0	0	0	1	0
Livingston (loan)	2021–22	Scottish Premiership	8	0	1	0	0	0	0	0	9	0
Crawley Town (loan)	2022–23	League Two	10	0	1	0	1	0	2	0	14	0
Tabor Sežana	2023–24	Slovenian Second League	5	2	0	0	—		—		5	2
AC Bellinzona	2024–25	Swiss Challenge League	10	1	2	1	—		—		12	2
Career total			58	5	5	1	3	0	8	1	74	7
