= Ethan Johnston =

English footballer (born 2002)

Personal information
- Full name: Ethan Owen Liam Johnston
- Date of birth: 13 June 2002 (age 24)
- Place of birth: Kettering, England
- Height: 1.84 m (6 ft 0 in)
- Position: Forward

Team information
- Current team: Banbury United

Youth career
- –2020: Northampton Town

Senior career*
Years	Team	Apps	(Gls)
2020–2021	Northampton Town	0	(0)
2021–2021	Banbury United	0	(0)
2021–2023	St Ives Town	0	(0)
2023–	AFC Rushden & Diamonds	87	(8)
- * Club domestic league appearances and goals as of 16 September 2020

Ethan Owen Liam Johnston (born 13 June 2002) is an English footballer who plays as a forward for AFC Rushden & Diamonds.

== Career ==
On 18 February 2020, Johnston signed his first professional contract with Northampton Town. Johnston made his professional debut with Northampton Town in a 4-0 EFL Cup loss to Bristol City on 16 September 2020. On 11 May 2021, Johnston was one of six players released by Northampton Town.

On 28 July 2021, Johnston signed for Southern League Premier Division Central side Banbury United.

Per 27 November 2021 Johnston transferred to St Ives Town.
