= 2024 EFL League One play-off final =

Association football match

Bolton Wanderers	Oxford United
0	2
- Date: 18 May 2024
- Venue: Wembley Stadium, London
- Man of the Match: Josh Murphy
- Referee: Sam Barrott
- Attendance: 70,472

The 2024 EFL League One play-off final was an association football match that took place on 18 May 2024 at Wembley Stadium, London, to determine the third and final team to gain promotion from EFL League One, the third tier of English football, to the EFL Championship. The top two teams of the 2023–24 EFL League One, Portsmouth and Derby County, gained automatic promotion to the Championship.

== Route to the final ==
EFL League One final table, leading positions
Pos	Team	Pld	W	D	L	GF	GA	GD	Pts
1	Portsmouth (C, P)	46	28	13	5	78	41	+37	97
2	Derby County (P)	46	28	8	10	78	37	+41	92
3	Bolton Wanderers	46	25	12	9	86	51	+35	87
4	Peterborough United	46	25	9	12	89	61	+28	84
5	Oxford United (O, P)	46	22	11	13	79	56	+23	77
6	Barnsley	46	21	13	12	82	64	+18	76

(C) Champions; (O) Play-off winners; (P) Promoted

Bolton Wanderers finished the regular 2023–24 season in third place in EFL League One, the third tier of the English football league system, two places and 10 points ahead of Oxford United. Both, therefore, missed out on the two automatic places for promotion to the EFL Championship and instead took part in the play-offs to determine the third promoted team. Bolton finished five points behind Derby County (who were promoted in second place) and 10 behind league winners Portsmouth. They finished 11 points ahead of Barnsley, their opponents in the play-off semi-final. Oxford United finished seven points behind Peterborough United, their semi-final opponents. The format for the play-offs was two semi-finals, played over two legs, followed by the final.

The first leg between Bolton and Barnsley took place at Oakwell on 3 May. Dion Charles put Bolton ahead in the 23rd minute, scoring from a Paris Maghoma cross. He scored a second on 53 minutes from the penalty spot after Liam Roberts had fouled Josh Sheehan. Barnsley pulled one back when substitute Sam Cosgrove, on for Devante Cole, scored. They were unable to find an equaliser and Randell Williams scored direct from a corner kick to make it 3–1 to Bolton, the final score.

On 4 May, Elliott Moore's goal was enough to give Oxford United victory as they beat Peterborough United by a single goal at the Kassam Stadium.

Bolton and Barnsley played their second leg on 7 May at the Toughsheet Community Stadium. Sam Cosgrove put Barnsley 1–0 up on 36 minutes. Aaron Collins scored from 25 yards (23 m) on 43 minutes and three minutes later a headed goal from Eoin Toal put the hosts 2–1 at half-time. In the second half a deflected shot from Adam Phillips on 64 minutes and another Cosgrove goal on 76 minutes brought Barnsley within a goal of bringing the tie level. No goals followed and Bolton won 5–4 on aggregate securing their place in the final on 18 May.

The return leg between Peterborough United and Oxford United at the Weston Homes Stadium on 8 May finished 1–1. Josh Knight scored for Peterborough United on 41 minutes and a goal from the penalty spot from Cameron Brannagan drew the game level. The tie finished 2–1 on aggregate in Oxford's favour taking them to Wembley to face Bolton Wanderers.

== Match ==
=== Background ===
The match was Bolton's first appearance in a play-off final since 2001 when they appeared in the 2001 First Division play-off final played in Cardiff, and beat Preston North End 3–0.

This was the third time Oxford United had been in a play-off final, the most recent being the 2020 EFL League One play-off final which they lost to Wycombe Wanderers. Games between the two clubs in the 2023–24 season resulted in a goalless draw at the Kassam Stadium in November 2023 and a 5–0 Bolton victory at the Toughsheet Community Stadium in March 2024.

The match was televised live by Sky Sports on both its Football and Main Event channels and was also available for live streaming on Sky Go and NOW. BBC Local Radio stations covered the game for each team: BBC Radio Manchester for Bolton Wanderers and BBC Radio Oxford for Oxford United. Talksport provided national radio commentary.

=== Details ===
18 May 2024
16:15 BST

Bolton Wanderers	0–2	Oxford United
	Report	Murphy 31', 42'

Wembley Stadium, London
Attendance: 70,472
Referee: Sam Barrott

Bolton Wanderers	Oxford United

GK	1	(England) Nathan Baxter	(yellow card) 72'
RWB	12	(England) Josh Dacres-Cogley
LWB	17	(England) Nathanael Ogbeta		(substituted off) 66'
CB	5	(Portugal) Ricardo Santos (c)
CB	2	(Australia) Gethin Jones	(yellow card) 47'
CB	18	(Northern Ireland) Eoin Toal
CM	17	(England) Paris Maghoma		(substituted off) 49'
CM	4	(England) George Thomason	(yellow card) 77'
DM	8	(Wales) Josh Sheehan		(substituted off) 65'
RS	10	(Northern Ireland) Dion Charles		(substituted off) 66'
LS	28	(Wales) Aaron Collins
Substitutes:
MF	22	(England) Kyle Dempsey	(yellow card) 68'	(substituted on) 49'
DF	3	(Australia) Jack Iredale		(substituted on) 65'
FW	14	(Nigeria) Victor Adeboyejo		(substituted on) 66'
FW	35	(England) Cameron Jerome		(substituted on) 66'
Head Coach:
(England) Ian Evatt

GK	1	(England) Jamie Cumming
RB	2	(England) Sam Long
LB	12	(England) Joe Bennett		(substituted off) 87'
CM	8	(England) Cameron Brannagan		(substituted off) 64'
CB	5	(England) Elliott Moore	(c)
CB	3	(Northern Ireland) Ciaron Brown
RM	20	(Portugal) Rúben Rodrigues		(substituted off) 80'
LM	19	(England) Tyler Goodrham	(yellow card) 90+8'
CF	21	(Wales) Mark Harris
RW	30	(England) Owen Dale
LW	23	(England) Josh Murphy
Substitutes:
MF	18	(England) Marcus McGuane		(substituted on) 64'
MF	6	(England) Josh McEachran		(substituted on) 80'
DF	22	(Jamaica) Greg Leigh		(substituted on) 87'
Head Coach:
(England) Des Buckingham

Statistics
	Bolton Wanderers	Oxford United
Possession	63.4%	36.6%
Goals scored	0	2
Shots on target	0	5
Shots off target	3	4
Fouls committed	12	12
Corner kicks	7	3
Yellow cards	4	1
Red cards	0	0
