= 2023–24 Bolton Wanderers F.C. season =

135th season in existence of Bolton Wanderers FC

Bolton Wanderers
2023–24 season
- Owner: Football Ventures (Whites) Ltd (92%); British Business Bank (8%)
- Chairman: Sharon Brittan
- Manager: Ian Evatt
- Stadium: Toughsheet Community Stadium
- League One: 3rd
- FA Cup: Third Round
- EFL Cup: Second Round
- EFL Trophy: Quarter Final
- Play-offs: Final
- Top goalscorer: League: Dion Charles (14); All: Dion Charles (20)
- Highest home attendance: 25,738 (vs. Portsmouth, 13 April)
- Lowest home attendance: 2,150 (vs. Port Vale, 5 December)
- Average home league attendance: 21,022
- Biggest win: 8–1, vs. Manchester United U21, 26 September; 7–0 vs. Exeter City, 25 November
- Biggest defeat: 0–4, vs. Wigan Athletic, 19 August
Home colours	Away colours

The 2023–24 season was the 135th season in the existence of Bolton Wanderers Football Club and the club's third consecutive season in EFL League One. It covered the period from 1 July 2023 to 30 June 2024. In addition to the league, they also competed in the FA Cup, the EFL Cup, and the EFL Trophy.

Bolton's kits for the 2023–24 design were voted on by Bolton fans from a choice of three kits for both. The choices for the home kit were between a remade version of the 1983–84 kit, a remade version of the 1993–94 kit, and a third alternate design. The choices for the away kit were from Teal Diamonds, Navy x Hot Pink, and Graphic Black. The 1983–84 and Graphic Black options won the votes.

== Current squad ==
As of 19 April 2024

No.	Name	Position	Nationality	Place of birth	Date of birth (age)	Signed from	Date signed	Fee	Contract end
Goalkeepers
1	Nathan Baxter	GK	(England)	Westminster	8 November 1998 (age 28)	Chelsea	1 July 2023	Free Transfer	30 June 2025
13	Joel Coleman	GK	(England)	Bolton	26 September 1995 (age 31)	Ipswich Town	1 July 2023	Free Transfer	30 June 2025
Defenders
2	Gethin Jones	CB	(Australia)	Perth	13 October 1995 (age 31)	Carlisle United	4 August 2020	Free Transfer	30 June 2025
3	Jack Iredale	CB	(Australia)	(Scotland) Greenock	2 May 1996 (age 30)	Cambridge United	1 July 2022	Free Transfer	30 June 2025
5	Ricardo Santos	CB	(Portugal)	(Portugal) Almada	18 June 1995 (age 31)	Barnet	3 August 2020	Free Transfer	30 June 2025
6	George Johnston	CB	(Scotland)	(England) Manchester	1 September 1998 (age 28)	(Netherlands) Feyenoord	1 July 2021	Free Transfer	30 June 2026
12	Josh Dacres-Cogley	RWB	(England)	Coventry	12 March 1996 (age 30)	Tranmere Rovers	1 July 2023	Free Transfer	30 June 2025
15	Will Forrester	CB	(England)	Alsager	29 June 2001 (age 25)	Port Vale	4 July 2023	Undisclosed	30 June 2026
17	Nathanael Ogbeta	LWB	(England)	Salford	28 April 2001 (age 25)	(Wales) Swansea City	26 January 2024	Loan	31 May 2024
18	Eoin Toal	CB	(Northern Ireland)	Armagh	15 February 1999 (age 27)	(Northern Ireland) Derry City	20 July 2022	Undisclosed	30 June 2027
20	Calvin Ramsay	RWB	(Scotland)	Aberdeen	31 July 2003 (age 23)	Liverpool	29 January 2024	Loan	31 May 2024
21	Caleb Taylor	CB	(England)	Burnley	14 January 2003 (age 23)	West Bromwich Albion	1 February 2024	Loan	31 May 2024
26	Zac Ashworth	LWB	(Wales)	(England) King's Lynn	6 September 2002 (age 24)	West Bromwich Albion	20 July 2023	Loan	31 May 2024
27	Randell Williams	LWB	(England)	London	30 December 1996 (age 29)	Hull City	5 January 2023	Undisclosed	30 June 2025
Midfielders
4	George Thomason	CM	(England)	Barrow-in-Furness	12 January 2001 (age 25)	Longridge Town	6 January 2020	Free Transfer	30 June 2027
7	Carlos Mendes Gomes	AM	(Guinea-Bissau)	(Senegal) Pikine	14 November 1998 (age 27)	Luton Town	24 July 2023	£300,000	30 June 2026
8	Josh Sheehan	CM	(Wales)	Pembrey	30 March 1995 (age 31)	(Wales) Newport County	1 July 2021	Free Transfer	30 June 2025
16	Aaron Morley	CM	(England)	Bury	27 February 2000 (age 26)	Rochdale	11 January 2022	£100,000	30 June 2027
19	Paris Maghoma	CM	(England)	Enfield	8 May 2001 (age 25)	Brentford	31 July 2023	Loan	31 May 2024
22	Kyle Dempsey	CM	(England)	Whitehaven	17 September 1995 (age 31)	Gillingham	31 January 2022	£150,000	30 June 2026
Forwards
9	Jón Daði Böðvarsson	CF	(Iceland)	Selfoss	25 May 1992 (age 34)	Millwall	20 January 2022	Free Transfer	30 June 2024
10	Dion Charles	CF	(Northern Ireland)	(England) Preston	7 October 1995 (age 31)	Accrington Stanley	1 January 2022	£320,000	30 June 2026
11	Dan Nlundulu	CF	(England)	(France) Paris	5 February 1999 (age 27)	Southampton	24 June 2023	£250,000	30 June 2026
14	Victor Adeboyejo	CF	(Nigeria)	Ibadan	12 January 1998 (age 28)	Burton Albion	27 January 2023	£500,000	30 June 2026
28	Aaron Collins	CF	(Wales)	Newport	27 May 1997 (age 29)	Bristol Rovers	1 February 2024	£750,000	30 June 2027
35	Cameron Jerome	CF	(England)	Huddersfield	14 August 1986 (age 40)	Luton Town	27 January 2023	Free Transfer	30 June 2024
39	Conor Carty	CF	(Republic of Ireland)	Dunlavin	25 May 2002 (age 24)	Wolverhampton Wanderers	1 July 2022	Free Transfer	30 June 2025
B Team
40	Luke Hutchinson	GK	(England)		1 September 2002 (age 24)	Academy	1 July 2021	—N/a	30 June 2024
45	Sam Inwood	LWB	(Northern Ireland)	(England) Salford		Academy	1 July 2023	—N/a	30 June 2026
48	Sonny Sharples-Ahmed	CM	(Egypt)	(England) Salford		Academy	1 July 2023	—N/a	30 June 2024
49	Ben Andreucci	CF	(Scotland)	(England) Bedford	5 October 2004 (age 22)	Leeds United	1 July 2023	Free Transfer	30 June 2025
50	Noah Halford	CB	(England)			Academy	1 July 2023	—N/a	30 June 2024
	Jack Flint	GK	(England)			Crewe Alexandra	22 August 2023	Free Transfer	30 June 2024
	Wes Frimpong	RWB	(Netherlands)			Academy	1 July 2023	—N/a	30 June 2024
	Charlie Hayes-Green	CB	(England)		30 December 2004 (age 21)	Liverpool	1 July 2023	Free Transfer	30 June 2024
	Lamine Toure	CB	(England)		24 December 2003 (age 22)	Academy	1 July 2022	—N/a	30 June 2024
	Matthew Tweedley	CM	(England)	Rochdale	16 April 2004 (age 22)	Academy	1 July 2022	—N/a	30 June 2024
Out on loan
25	Declan John	LWB	(Wales)	Merthyr Tydfil	30 June 1995 (age 31)	(Wales) Swansea City	1 July 2021	Free Transfer	30 June 2024
38	Nelson Khumbeni	CM	(Malawi)	Lilongwe	14 October 2002 (age 24)	Norwich City	1 July 2022	Free Transfer	30 June 2025
41	Luke Matheson	RWB	(England)	Manchester	3 October 2002 (age 24)	Wolverhampton Wanderers	1 August 2023	Free Transfer	30 June 2025
	Ellis Litherland-Riding	GK	(England)			Academy	1 July 2022	—N/a	30 June 2025
	Max Conway	LWB	(England)	Manchester	5 September 2003 (age 23)	Academy	1 July 2022	—N/a	30 June 2025
	Eric Yoro	CB	(Republic of Ireland)	Dublin	19 February 2004 (age 22)	(Republic of Ireland) UCD	15 July 2022	Undisclosed	30 June 2024
	Trevon Bryan	CF	(Jamaica)		8 March 2005 (age 21)	Burnley	1 July 2023	Free Transfer	30 June 2025
	Finlay Lockett	CF	(England)	Marple	10 April 2003 (age 23)	Academy	1 July 2021	—N/a	30 June 2024
	Gerald Sithole	CF	(England)	Ashford	28 December 2002 (age 23)	Gillingham	1 July 2022	Free Transfer	30 June 2024

== Transfers ==
=== In ===
Date	Pos	Player	Transferred from	Fee	Ref
24 June 2023	CF	(England) Dan Nlundulu	(England) Southampton	Undisclosed (Note: The transfer was reported to be around £250,000 by The Bolton News.)	
1 July 2023 (Note: The transfer was announced on 7 June, and would become official on July 1 once his Leeds United contract expired)	CF	(Scotland) Ben Andreucci ‡	(England) Leeds United	Free Transfer	
1 July 2023 (Note: The transfer was announced on 19 June, and would become official on July 1 once his Chelsea contract expired)	GK	(England) Nathan Baxter	(England) Chelsea	Free Transfer	
1 July 2023 (Note: The transfer was announced on 22 June, and would become official on July 1 once his Burnley contract expired)	CF	(Jamaica) Trevon Bryan ‡	(England) Burnley	Free Transfer	
1 July 2023 (Note: The transfer was announced on 20 June, and would become official on July 1 once his Ipswich Town contract expired)	GK	(England) Joel Coleman	(England) Ipswich Town	Free Transfer	
1 July 2023 (Note: The transfer was announced on 21 June, and would become official on July 1 once his Tranmere Rovers contract expired)	RWB	(England) Josh Dacres-Cogley	(England) Tranmere Rovers	Free Transfer	
1 July 2023 (Note: The transfer was announced on 14 June, and would become official on July 1 once his Liverpool contract expired)	CB	(England) Charlie Hayes-Green ‡	(England) Liverpool	Free Transfer	
4 July 2023	CB	(England) Will Forrester	(England) Port Vale	Undisclosed	
24 July 2023	AM	(Guinea-Bissau) Carlos Mendes Gomes	(England) Luton Town	Undisclosed (Note: The transfer was reported to be around £300,000 by The Bolton News.)	
1 August 2023	RWB	(England) Luke Matheson ‡	(England) Wolverhampton Wanderers	Free Transfer	
22 August 2023	GK	(England) Jack Flint ‡	(England) Crewe Alexandra	Free Transfer	
1 February 2024	CF	(Wales) Aaron Collins	(England) Bristol Rovers	Undisclosed (Note: The transfer was reported to be around £750,000 by The Bolton News.)	

‡ Signed for 'B' Team

=== Out ===
Date	Pos	Player	Transferred to	Fee	Ref
30 June 2023	GK	(England) Mackenzie Chapman	(England) Blackpool	Released	
30 June 2023	GK	(England) Joel Dixon	(England) Hartlepool United	Released	
30 June 2023	LW	(England) Matty Grivosti	(England) Warrington Town	Released	
30 June 2023	RW	(Wales) Lloyd Isgrove	(England) Sholing	Released	
30 June 2023	CF	(Democratic Republic of the Congo) Elias Kachunga	(England) Cambridge United	Released	
30 June 2023	CM	(England) Kieran Lee		Released	
30 June 2023	RWB	(England) Lynford Sackey		Released	
30 June 2023	RB	(England) Adam Senior	(England) FC Halifax Town	Released	
30 June 2023	AM	(England) Connor Stanley	(England) Hereford	Released	
12 July 2023	DM	(Wales) MJ Williams	(England) Milton Keynes Dons	Undisclosed	
1 September 2023	RW	(Republic of Ireland) Kieran Sadlier	(England) Wycombe Wanderers	Mutual Consent	
2 February 2024	CM	(England) Arran Pettifer	(Republic of Ireland) St Patrick's Athletic	Undisclosed	

=== Loaned in ===
Date	Pos	Player	Loaned from	On loan until	Ref
20 July 2023	LWB	(Wales) Zac Ashworth	(England) West Bromwich Albion	End of season	
31 July 2023	CM	(England) Paris Maghoma	(England) Brentford	End of season	
26 January 2024	LWB	(England) Nathanael Ogbeta	(Wales) Swansea City	End of season	
29 January 2024	RWB	(Scotland) Calvin Ramsay	(England) Liverpool	End of season	
1 February 2024	CB	(England) Caleb Taylor	(England) West Bromwich Albion	End of Season	

=== Loaned out ===
Date	Pos	Player	Loaned to	On loan until	Ref
4 February 2023	CF	(Republic of Ireland) Conor Carty	(Republic of Ireland) St Patrick's Athletic	30 November 2023	
18 August 2023	CM	(England) Arran Pettifer	(England) Warrington Town	18 September 2023	
24 August 2023	LWB	(England) Max Conway	(England) Rochdale	6 October 2023	
25 August 2023	GK	(England) Luke Hutchinson	(England) Hyde United	31 August 2023	
1 September 2023	LWB	(Wales) Declan John	(England) Salford City	End of season (Note: On 5 January, John's loan at Salford City was extended until the end of the season.)	
21 September 2023	CF	(England) Gerald Sithole	(England) Altrincham	21 November 2023	
7 October 2023	LWB	(England) Max Conway	(England) AFC Fylde	End of season (Note: On 7 November, Conway's loan at Fylde was extended until the end of January.) (Note: On 31 January, Conway's loan at Fylde was extended until the end of the season.)	
7 October 2023	CM	(Malawi) Nelson Khumbeni	(England) AFC Fylde	5 January 2024 (Note: On 7 November, Khumbeni's loan at Fylde was extended until the end of January. He was recalled earlier in January.)	
8 December 2023	CB	(England) Lamine Toure	(England) Bamber Bridge	24 March 2024 (Note: On 8 January, Toure's loan at Bamber Bridge was extended until the end of the season. On 24 March, Toure was recalled early.)	
15 December 2023	CM	(Egypt) Sonny Sharples-Ahmed	(England) Bamber Bridge	15 January 2024	
16 December 2023	GK	(England) Luke Hutchinson	(England) Marine	19 February 2024 (Note: On 18 January, Hutchinson's loan at Marine was extended until the end of the season. On 19 February, he was recalled from his loan.)	
3 January 2024	CF	(Republic of Ireland) Conor Carty	(England) Doncaster Rovers	2 February 2024 (Note: On 2 February, Carty's loan at Doncaster Rovers was cut short due to injury.)	
10 January 2024	CF	(Jamaica) Trevon Bryan	(England) FC United of Manchester	End of season (Note: On 14 February, Bryan's loan at FC United of Manchester was extended until the end of the season.)	
1 February 2024	CB	(Republic of Ireland) Eric Yoro	(Northern Ireland) Cliftonville	End of season	
1 February 2024	CM	(Malawi) Nelson Khumbeni	(England) Morecambe	End of season	
9 February 2024	CF	(Scotland) Ben Andreucci	(England) Buxton	11 April 2024 (Note: On 13 March, Andreucci's loan at Buxton was extended until the end of the season. On 11 April, he was recalled from his loan after sustaining an injury.)	
22 February 2024	RWB	(England) Luke Matheson	(Republic of Ireland) Bohemians	30 June 2024	
28 March 2024	AM	(Portugal) Gio Loureiro	(England) Nantwich Town	End of season	
28 March 2024	CF	(England) Finlay Lockett	(England) Southport	End of season	
28 March 2024	CF	(England) Gerald Sithole	(England) Chorley	End of season	
19 April 2024	GK	(England) Ellis Litherland-Riding	(England) Bamber Bridge	End of season	

== Pre-season and friendlies ==
On 26 May 2023, the club announced its first set of pre-season fixtures with trips to Bamber Bridge, Curzon Ashton, Chester and Salford City. Three fixtures were also announced for the B Team on the same day with trips to Lancaster City, Longridge Town and Atherton Collieries. On 8 June, a home friendly against Premier League side Everton was later added. Bolton were due to face 'top-flight' European opposition in their final friendly but the agreement broke down at the last moment despite their best efforts. West Bromwich Albion were confirmed to be the replacement on 12 June.

Win Draw Loss Fixtures

8 July 2023 Friendly	Bamber Bridge	0–1	Bolton Wanderers	Bamber Bridge
15:00 BST		Report	Williams 80'	Stadium: Sir Tom Finney Stadium

11 July 2023 Friendly	Curzon Ashton	1–3	Bolton Wanderers	Ashton-under-Lyne
19:45 BST	Mols 50' (pen.)	Report	Dacres-Cogley 3'; Jones 26'; Jerome 64'	Stadium: Tameside Stadium; Attendance: 702

12 July 2023 Friendly	Lancaster City	1–1	Bolton Wanderers B	Lancaster
19:00 BST	Trialist 51'	Report	Bryan 2'	Stadium: Giant Axe; Attendance: 224

15 July 2023 Friendly	Chester	1–1	Bolton Wanderers	Chester
15:00 BST	Taylor 45'	Report	Thomason 35'	Stadium: Deva Stadium; Attendance: 1,419

18 July 2023 Friendly	Bolton Wanderers	5–2	Bradford City	Bolton
13:00 BST	Charles; Adeboyejo; Böðvarsson; Nlundulu; Jerome	Report	Cook; Smith	Stadium: Eddie Davies Academy; Attendance: Behind closed doors

18 July 2023 Friendly	Longridge Town	2–5	Bolton Wanderers B	Longridge
19:00 BST	Halford 50' (o.g.); Ing 82' (pen.)	Report	Pettifer 40'; Bryan 44'; Andreucci 56'; Lockett 62'; Loureiro 68'	Stadium: Recycling Lives Ground; Attendance: 202

22 July 2023 Friendly	Atherton Collieries	2–5	Bolton Wanderers B	Atherton
12:00 BST	Hayes-Green 48' (o.g.); Evans 70'	Report	Matheson 10'; Lockett 38'; Andreucci 40'; Graham 62'; Frimpong 80'	Stadium: Alder House

22 July 2023 Friendly	Salford City	1–2	Bolton Wanderers	Salford
15:00 BST	Hendry 50'	Report	Thomason 73'; Morley 86'	Stadium: Moor Lane

25 July 2023 Friendly	Bolton Wanderers	0–0	Everton	Bolton
19:45 BST		Report		Stadium: Toughsheet Community Stadium; Attendance: 13,242; Referee: Matt Donohue

29 July 2023 Friendly	Bolton Wanderers B	3–0	Everton U21	Bolton
12:00 BST	Pettifer; Lockett; Andreucci	Report		Stadium: Eddie Davies Academy; Attendance: Behind closed doors

29 July 2023 Friendly	Bolton Wanderers	4–3	West Bromwich Albion	Bolton
15:00 BST	Dempsey 45', 59'; Forrester 64'; Morley 90+5'	Report	Wallace 10'; Thomas-Asante 53', 69'	Stadium: Toughsheet Community Stadium; Attendance: 4,900; Referee: Simon Mather

== Competitions ==
=== Overall record ===
Competition	First match	Last match	Starting round	Final position	Record							
Competition	First match	Last match	Starting round	Final position	Pld	W	D	L	GF	GA	GD	Win %
League One	5 August 2023	27 April 2024	Matchday 1	3rd	46	25	12	9	86	51	+35	54.35
FA Cup	4 November 2023	16 January 2024	First round	Third round	4	2	1	1	10	3	+7	50.00
EFL Cup	8 August 2023	29 August 2023	First round	Second Round	2	1	0	1	2	3	−1	50.00
EFL Trophy	5 September 2023	30 January 2024	Group stage	Quarter Final	6	5	1	0	18	2	+16	83.33
Play-offs	3 May 2024	18 May 2024	Semi-Final	Final	3	1	0	2	5	6	−1	33.33
Total					61	34	14	13	121	65	+56	55.74

Last updated: 18 May 2024
Source: Soccerway

=== League One ===
==== League table ====
Pos	Team	Pld	W	D	L	GF	GA	GD	Pts	Promotion, qualification or relegation
1	Portsmouth (C, P)	46	28	13	5	78	41	+37	97	Promotion to EFL Championship
2	Derby County (P)	46	28	8	10	78	37	+41	92	Promotion to EFL Championship
3	Bolton Wanderers	46	25	12	9	86	51	+35	87	Qualification for League One play-offs
4	Peterborough United	46	25	9	12	89	61	+28	84	Qualification for League One play-offs
5	Oxford United (O, P)	46	22	11	13	79	56	+23	77	Qualification for League One play-offs
6	Barnsley	46	21	13	12	82	64	+18	76	Qualification for League One play-offs

Source: EFL Official Website
Rules for classification: 1) Points; 2) Goal difference; 3) Number of goals scored; 4) Head-to-head results; 5) Wins; 6) Away goals; 7) Penalty points (sec 9.5); 8) 12-point sending off offences
(C) Champions; (O) Play-off winners; (P) Promoted

==== Results summary ====
Overall								Home						Away					
Pld	W	D	L	GF	GA	GD	Pts	W	D	L	GF	GA	GD	W	D	L	GF	GA	GD
46	25	12	9	86	51	+35	87	15	5	3	52	27	+25	10	7	6	34	24	+10

Last updated: 27 April 2024.
Source: Soccerway

==== Results by round ====
Round	1	2	3	4	5	6	8	9	10	11	12	14	15	16	7^{1}	17	19	20	21	22	23	24	25	26	29	28^{5}	30	31	32	33	34	18^{3}	35	27^{4}	36	13^{2}	37	38	39	41	42	43	44	40^{6}	45	46
Ground	H	A	H	H	A	H	A	H	A	H	H	H	A	A	A	H	H	A	A	H	H	A	A	H	A	H	A	H	A	H	H	A	A	A	H	A	A	H	A	A	H	A	H	H	H	A
Result	W	W	W	L	D	W	L	D	W	W	L	W	W	W	W	W	W	D	L	L	W	W	W	W	L	W	W	D	D	W	D	W	L	L	W	D	D	W	L	D	W	W	D	D	W	D
Position	3	1	1	2	3	2	7	7	4	3	6	4	3	3	3	1	1	2	2	5	3	3	2	2	4	3	2	3	3	3	3	3	3	3	3	2	3	3	3	3	3	3	3	3	3	3
Points	3	6	9	9	10	13	13	14	17	20	20	23	26	29	32	35	38	39	39	39	42	45	48	51	51	54	57	58	59	62	63	66	66	66	69	70	71	74	74	75	78	81	82	83	86	87

Updated to match(es) played on 27 April 2024. Source: Soccerway
W = Win; D = Draw; L = Loss; P = Postponed
Notes:
- ^{1} Matchday 7 (vs Shrewsbury Town) was postponed due to the international call-ups.
- ^{2} Matchday 13 (vs Barnsley) was postponed due to the international call-ups.
- ^{3} Matchday 18 (vs Cambridge United) was postponed due to the international call-ups. It was rearranged again after being abandoned due to a waterlogged pitch.
- ^{4} Matchday 27 (vs Wigan Athletic) was postponed due to FA Cup involvements.
- ^{5} Matchday 28 (vs Cheltenham Town) was rescheduled after the previous match was abandoned due to a fan suffering a cardiac arrest.
- ^{6} Matchday 40 (vs Shrewsbury Town) was postponed due to the international call-ups.

==== Matches ====
The fixtures for the 2023–24 EFL League One season were released on 22 June and sees Bolton opening their campaign at home to Lincoln City on 5 August. The regular season will conclude on 27 April away at Peterborough United. On 3 July the club announced that both games against Wigan Athletic would be moved forward to a 12.30 kick off time on police advice.

Win Draw Loss Fixtures

5 August 2023 1	Bolton Wanderers	3–0	Lincoln City	Bolton
15:00 BST	Iredale 4'; Sheehan (yellow card) 14'; Adeboyejo 59'; O'Connor 74' (o.g.); Maghoma (yellow card) 87'; Nlundulu (yellow card) 90+7'	Report	House (yellow card) 27'; Eyoma (yellow card) 45+6'; Mandroiu (yellow card) 49'	Stadium: Toughsheet Community Stadium; Attendance: 20,143; Referee: Will Finnie

12 August 2023 2	Cheltenham Town	0–3	Bolton Wanderers	Cheltenham
15:00 BST	Davies (yellow card) 29'; Smith (yellow card) 39'	Report	Charles 15', 33'; Smith 30' (o.g.); Adeboyejo (yellow card) 57'	Stadium: Whaddon Road; Attendance: 4,898; Referee: David Rock

15 August 2023 3	Bolton Wanderers	3–1	Fleetwood Town	Bolton
19:45 BST	Adeboyejo 3', 14', 37'; Thomason (yellow card) 28'; Charles (yellow card) 45+1' (yellow-red card) 68'; Evatt (red card) 72'; Ashworth (yellow card) 86'	Report	Johnston (yellow card) 10'; Broom (yellow card) 47'; Omochere (yellow card) 54'; Vela (yellow card) 79'; Earl 90+4'	Stadium: Toughsheet Community Stadium; Attendance: 18,485; Referee: Tom Nield

19 August 2023 4	Bolton Wanderers	0–4	Wigan Athletic	Bolton
12:30 BST	Iredale (yellow card) 53'; Jones (yellow card) 72'	Report	Wyke 12', 75'; Humphrys 24', 45+4', (yellow card) 45'; Watts (yellow card) 56'; Adeeko (yellow card) 80'	Stadium: Toughsheet Community Stadium; Attendance: 24,116; Referee: Tom Reeves

26 August 2023 5	Burton Albion	1–1	Bolton Wanderers	Burton upon Trent
15:00 BST	Harper (yellow card) 15'; Helm 46'; Oshilaja (yellow card) 56'; Crocombe (yellow card) 57'; Caprice (yellow card) 74'; Moon (yellow card) 84'; Carayol (yellow card) 87'	Report	Maghoma (yellow card) 20'; Thomason (yellow card) 44'; Charles 58'	Stadium: Pirelli Stadium; Attendance: 3,711; Referee: Carl Brook

2 September 2023 6	Bolton Wanderers	2–1	Derby County	Bolton
15:00 BST	Charles 43' (pen.); Santos (yellow card) 60'; Dacres-Cogley 65'; Thomason (yellow card) 70'; Williams (yellow card) 84'	Report	Hourihane 34' (pen.); Smith (yellow card) 43'; Wildsmith (red card) 48'; Forsyth (yellow card) 70'	Stadium: Toughsheet Community Stadium; Attendance: 21,754; Referee: Charles Breakspear

16 September 2023 8	Reading	2–1	Bolton Wanderers	Reading
15:00 BST	Ballard (yellow card) 30'; Savage 77', (yellow card) 90+2'; Yiadom (yellow card) 79'; Vickers 86'	Report	Santos (yellow card) 13'; Toal (yellow card) 16' (yellow-red card) 90+4'; Charles 20'; Williams (yellow card) 38'; Jerome (yellow card) 76'; Thomason (yellow card) 76'	Stadium: Madjeski Stadium; Referee: Lee Swabey

23 September 2023 9	Bolton Wanderers	1–1	Peterborough United	Bolton
15:00 BST	Iredale (yellow card) 4'; Dacres-Cogley (yellow card) 39'; Adeboyejo 43'; Jones (red card) 45+2'; Dempsey (yellow card) 47'; Thomason (yellow card) 81'	Report	Kioso (yellow card) 39'; Clarke-Harris 42'; Collins (yellow card) 90+4'	Stadium: Toughsheet Community Stadium; Attendance: 21,318; Referee: Ross Joyce

30 September 2023 10	Port Vale	0–1	Bolton Wanderers	Burslem
15:00 BST	Iacovitti (yellow card) 3'; Balmer (yellow card) 45+1'	Report	Charles 43'; Iredale (yellow card) 64'; Morley (yellow card) 68'; Sheehan (yellow card) 77'	Stadium: Vale Park; Attendance: 10,457; Referee: Declan Bourne

3 October 2023 11	Bolton Wanderers	3–2	Stevenage	Bolton
19:45 BST	Charles 13' (pen.); Thomason (yellow card) 29'; Iredale (yellow card) 44', (goal) 49'; Jerome (yellow card) 64'; Sheehan 70'	Report	Reid 20', 64' (pen.), (yellow card) 68'; Sweeney (yellow card) 69'	Stadium: Toughsheet Community Stadium; Attendance: 17,997; Referee: Josh Smith

7 October 2023 12	Bolton Wanderers	1–3	Carlisle United	Bolton
15:00 BST	Mellish 28' (o.g.); Dempsey (yellow card) 35'; Charles (yellow card) 82'; Sheehan (yellow card) 90+8'	Report	Gibson 44' (pen.), 70', 90+5'; Lavelle (yellow card) 7'; McCalmont (yellow card) 38'; Armer (yellow card) 90+6'	Stadium: Toughsheet Community Stadium; Attendance: 23,187; Referee: Sebastian Stockbridge

21 October 2023 14	Bolton Wanderers	2–1	Northampton Town	Bolton
15:00 BST	Charles 8'; Williams 16'	Report	Hoskins 66'; Hondermarck (yellow card) 86'	Stadium: Toughsheet Community Stadium; Attendance: 19,160; Referee: Martin Coy

24 October 2023 15	Wycombe Wanderers	2–4	Bolton Wanderers	High Wycombe
19:45 BST	Scowen (yellow card) 43'; Leahy 48'; Wheeler 82'; Keogh (yellow card) 88'; Low (yellow card) 90+1'	Report	Maghoma 14', (yellow card) 41'; Thomason 36'; Toal 85'; Morley 89' (pen.)	Stadium: Adams Park; Attendance: 4,935; Referee: Leigh Doughty

28 October 2023 16	Charlton Athletic	0–2	Bolton Wanderers	Charlton
15:00 BST	Jones (yellow card) 78'	Report	Williams 16'; Charles 21'; Baxter (yellow card) 77'	Stadium: The Valley; Attendance: 14,343; Referee: Geoff Eltringham

7 November 2023 7	Shrewsbury Town	0–2	Bolton Wanderers	Shrewsbury
19:45 GMT		Report	Maghoma 65'; Morley 90+8'	Stadium: The Croud Meadow; Attendance: 5,901; Referee: Sam Allison
Note: Fixture was originally scheduled for 9 September, but was postponed due to international call-ups.

11 November 2023 17	Bolton Wanderers	1–0	Blackpool	Bolton
15:00 GMT	Sheehan (yellow card) 21'; Maghoma (yellow card) 36'; Thomason 74'; Baxter (yellow card) 78'; Dacres-Cogley (yellow card) 78'; Santos (yellow card) 80'	Report	Thompson (yellow card) 57'	Stadium: Toughsheet Community Stadium; Attendance: 24,238; Referee: Ben Toner

25 November 2023 19	Bolton Wanderers	7–0	Exeter City	Bolton
15:00 GMT	Iredale 34'; Adeboyejo 43'; Maghoma 55'; Charles 63', 74'; Dempsey 87'; Nlundulu 90+2'	Report	Jules (yellow card) 17'	Stadium: Toughsheet Community Stadium; Attendance: 19,193; Referee: Benjamin Speedie

28 November 2023 20	Oxford United	0–0	Bolton Wanderers	Oxford
19:45 GMT	Mills (yellow card) 37'; Bodin (yellow card) 45+3'	Report	Thomason (yellow card) 25'; Baxter (yellow card) 45+3'	Stadium: Kassam Stadium; Attendance: 8,899; Referee: Sam Purkiss

11 December 2023 21	Portsmouth	2–0	Bolton Wanderers	Portsmouth
20:00 GMT	Robertson (yellow card) 10'; Sparkes (yellow card) 35'; Shaughnessy 45'; Rafferty (yellow card) 85'; Yengi 88'	Report	Thomason (yellow card) 14'; Sheehan (yellow card) 74'; Mendes Gomes (yellow card) 90+2'; Jones (yellow card) 90+5'	Stadium: Fratton Park; Attendance: 19,052; Referee: Paul Howard

16 December 2023 22	Bolton Wanderers	1–2	Bristol Rovers	Bolton
15:00 GMT	Santos (red card) 33'; Forrester (yellow card) 45+2'; Baxter (yellow card) 45+5'; Dempsey (yellow card) 81'; Toal 84'; Williams (yellow card) 88'	Report	Marquis 10'; Finley (yellow card) 17'; Thomas (yellow card) 29'; Evans 41'; Taylor (yellow card) 87'	Stadium: Toughsheet Community Stadium; Attendance: 19,543; Referee: Carl Brook

23 December 2023 23	Bolton Wanderers	3–2	Leyton Orient	Bolton
15:00 GMT	Dacres-Cogley 3'; Charles 7'; Thomason 10'	Report	Sotiriou (yellow card) 45+4'; James (yellow card) 54'; Forde 55'; Archibald (yellow card) 57', (goal) 60'; Happe (yellow card) 84'	Stadium: Toughsheet Community Stadium; Attendance: 21,482; Referee: Charles Breakspear

26 December 2023 24	Lincoln City	0–1	Bolton Wanderers	Lincoln
15:00 GMT	Makama (yellow card) 35'; Bishop (yellow card) 53'; Mandroiu (red card) 72'; Eyoma (yellow card) 88'	Report	Toal 89'; Dempsey (yellow card) 90+2'	Stadium: LNER Stadium; Attendance: 10,064; Referee: Neil Hair

29 December 2023 25	Fleetwood Town	0–2	Bolton Wanderers	Fleetwood
19:45 GMT	Sarpong-Wiredu (yellow card) 36'; Asamoah (yellow card) 82'	Report	Thomason (yellow card) 43'; Charles 49'; Adeboyejo 83'	Stadium: Highbury Stadium; Attendance: 3,922; Referee: Oliver Yates

1 January 2024 26	Bolton Wanderers	1–0	Burton Albion	Bolton
15:00 GMT	Moon 51' (o.g.); Morley (yellow card) 86'	Report	Baah (yellow card) 57'; Gilligan (yellow card) 65'	Stadium: Toughsheet Community Stadium; Attendance: 20,259; Referee: Darren Drysdale

13 January 2024 28	Bolton Wanderers	Abandoned	Cheltenham Town	Bolton
15:00 GMT		Report		Stadium: Toughsheet Community Stadium; Referee: Sunny Singh Gill
Note: Match abandoned after 29 minutes with the score at 0–0 due to a Bolton fan suffering a suspected cardiac arrest.

20 January 2024 29	Leyton Orient	1–0	Bolton Wanderers	Leyton
15:00 GMT	Sweeney (yellow card) 29'; Agyei 54'	Report	Sheehan (yellow card) 13'; Jerome (yellow card) 90+3'	Stadium: Gaughan Group Stadium; Referee: Alex Chilowicz

23 January 2024 28	Bolton Wanderers	1–0	Cheltenham Town	Bolton
19:45 GMT	Adeboyejo 24'; Thomason (yellow card) 90+6'	Report	Bradbury (yellow card) 44'; Harrop (yellow card) 87'	Stadium: Toughsheet Community Stadium; Attendance: 19,309; Referee: Ben Speedie
Note: Fixture was originally scheduled for 13 January but was abandoned after 29 minutes due to a Bolton fan suffering a suspected cardiac arrest.

27 January 2024 30	Carlisle United	1–4	Bolton Wanderers	Carlisle
15:00 GMT	Mellish (yellow card) 51'; Gibson 71'	Report	Ashworth 31'; Maghoma 36'; Toal (yellow card) 62'; Dacres-Cogley (yellow card) 85'; Dempsey 90+1'; Ogbeta 90+7'	Stadium: Brunton Park; Attendance: 11,443; Referee: Scott Oldham

3 February 2024 31	Bolton Wanderers	1–1	Barnsley	Bolton
15:00 GMT	Maghoma (yellow card) 18'; Ashworth 64'; Dempsey (yellow card) 84'	Report	de Gevigney (yellow card) 3'; Cole 5', (yellow card) 90+1'; Connell (yellow card) 35'; Williams (yellow card) 47'	Stadium: Toughsheet Community Stadium; Attendance: 21,709; Referee: Leigh Doughty

6 February 2024 18	Cambridge United	Abandoned	Bolton Wanderers	Cambridge
19:45 GMT				Stadium: Abbey Stadium; Referee: David Rock
Note: Fixture was originally scheduled for 18 November, but was postponed due to international call-ups. The rescheduled match was abandoned after nine minutes due to a waterlogged pitch with the score at 0–0.

10 February 2024 32	Northampton Town	1–1	Bolton Wanderers	Northampton
15:00 GMT	Bowie 2'	Report	Adeboyejo (yellow card) 23'; Thomason (red card) 27'; Sheehan (yellow card) 54'; Mendes Gomes 74'; Jones (yellow card) 90+1'	Stadium: Sixfields Stadium; Attendance: 7,593; Referee: Jeremy Simpson

13 February 2024 33	Bolton Wanderers	2–1	Wycombe Wanderers	Bolton
19:45 GMT	Jones 32'; Böðvarsson 90+1'; Coleman (yellow card) 90+7'	Report	Butcher (yellow card) 90+1'; Leahy 90+8' (pen.)	Stadium: Toughsheet Community Stadium; Attendance: 18,778; Referee: Will Finnie

17 February 2024 34	Bolton Wanderers	3–3	Charlton Athletic	Bolton
15:00 GMT	Adeboyejo 19'; Maghoma 51', (yellow card) 65'; Böðvarsson 71'; Sheehan (yellow card) 77'	Report	Small 22'; Jones (yellow card) 27', (goal) 40'; Coventry (yellow card) 37'; Anderson (yellow card) 48'; Dobson (yellow card) 49'; Kanu (yellow card) 54', (goal) 61'; May (yellow card) 90+3'	Stadium: Toughsheet Community Stadium; Attendance: 20,179; Referee: Ross Joyce

20 February 2024 18	Cambridge United	1–2	Bolton Wanderers	Cambridge
19:45 GMT	Toal 8' (o.g.); Cousins (yellow card) 40'; Kachunga (yellow card) 41'; Taylor (red card) 90+1'	Report	Sheehan (yellow card) 22'; Maghoma 52'; Mendes Gomes 63'; Iredale (yellow card) 90+1'	Stadium: Abbey Stadium; Attendance: 6,525; Referee: David Rock
Note: Fixture was originally scheduled for 18 November, but was postponed due to international call-ups. The rescheduled match was abandoned after nine minutes due to a waterlogged pitch with the score at 0–0.

24 February 2024 35	Blackpool	4–1	Bolton Wanderers	Blackpool
15:00 GMT	Beesley 16', 68' (pen.); Ekpiteta 27'; Grimshaw (yellow card) 61'; Lawrence-Gabriel 84'	Report	Thomason 9'; Mendes Gomes (yellow card) 30'; Jones (yellow card) 51'; Santos (red card) 66'	Stadium: Bloomfield Road; Attendance: 12,276; Referee: Josh Smith

27 February 2024 27	Wigan Athletic	1–0	Bolton Wanderers	Wigan
20:14 GMT	Magennis (yellow card) 45'; Smith (yellow card) 60'; Humphrys 69'; Smith (yellow card) 77'	Report	Maghoma (yellow card) 7'; Ogbeta (yellow card) 24'; Thomason (yellow card) 90+2'	Stadium: DW Stadium; Attendance: 13,204; Referee: John Busby
Note: Fixture was originally scheduled for 6 January, but was postponed due to FA Cup involvements. On the night of the match, the kick off was delayed 30 minutes due to supporters struggling to get into the stadium with the match kicking off at 20:14.

2 March 2024 36	Bolton Wanderers	2–0	Cambridge United	Bolton
15:00 GMT	Adeboyejo (yellow card) 27'; Thomason 35', (yellow card) 70'; Dacres-Cogley (yellow card) 46'; Collins 66'; Dempsey (yellow card) 82'	Report	Kaikai (yellow card) 41'; Morrison (yellow card) 66'	Stadium: Toughsheet Community Stadium; Attendance: 20,246; Referee: Ollie Yates

5 March 2024 13	Barnsley	2–2	Bolton Wanderers	Barnsley
19:45 BST	McAtee 25', (yellow card) 32'; Pines 47'; Williams (yellow card) 90+11'	Report	Thomason (yellow card) 11'; Adeboyejo 62'; Williams 90+8'; Jerome (yellow card) 90+9'; Iredale (yellow card) 90+10'	Stadium: Oakwell; Attendance: 14,808; Referee: James Bell
Note: Fixture was originally scheduled for 14 October, but was postponed due to international call-ups.

9 March 2024 37	Exeter City	2–2	Bolton Wanderers	Exeter
15:00 GMT	Cox 46', 49'; Aitchison (yellow card) 73'; Sweeney (yellow card) 90+7'	Report	Maghoma 33'; Toal 87'	Stadium: St James Park; Attendance: 6,748; Referee: Daniel Middleton

12 March 2024 38	Bolton Wanderers	5–0	Oxford United	Bolton
20:00 GMT	Ogbeta 19'; Dacres-Cogley 27'; Thomason 59'; Collins 65'; Sheehan 69'	Report	Dale (yellow card) 55'; Brannagan (yellow card) 63'; Brown (yellow card) 72'	Stadium: Toughsheet Community Stadium; Attendance: 19,134; Referee: Sunny Singh Gill
Note: Fixture was initially given a 19:45 kick-off time, but was moved for live Sky Sports coverage.

16 March 2024 39	Derby County	1–0	Bolton Wanderers	Derby
15:00 GMT	Mendez-Laing (yellow card) 59'; Wilson 78'	Report	Toal (yellow card) 28'	Stadium: Pride Park Stadium; Attendance: 32,538; Referee: Marc Edwards

29 March 2024 41	Stevenage	0–0	Bolton Wanderers	Stevenage
15:00 GMT		Report	Sheehan (yellow card) 75'; Maghoma (yellow card) 76'	Stadium: Broadhall Way; Attendance: 6,282; Referee: Sam Allison

1 April 2024 42	Bolton Wanderers	5–2	Reading	Bolton
15:00 BST	Collins 11', 45+4' (pen.), 77'; Ogbeta (yellow card) 16'; Böðvarsson 49', 90+5'; Sheehan (yellow card) 53'	Report	Wing 40'; Mukairu 90+2'	Stadium: Toughsheet Community Stadium; Attendance: 25,266; Referee: Ben Toner

6 April 2024 43	Bristol Rovers	0–2	Bolton Wanderers	Bristol
15:00 BST	Evans (yellow card) 33'; Thomas (yellow card) 55'; Martin (yellow card) 56'; Connolly (yellow card) 62'; Conteh (yellow card) 76'; Taylor (yellow card) 90+8'	Report	Collins 52'; Iredale (yellow card) 55'; Baxter (yellow card) 85'; Morley 90+8' (pen.)	Stadium: Memorial Stadium; Attendance: 8,814; Referee: Carl Brook

13 April 2024 44	Bolton Wanderers	1–1	Portsmouth	Bolton
15:00 BST	Toal (yellow card) 32'; Collins 36'; Santos (yellow card) 88'; Jerome (yellow card) 90+1'	Report	Kamara 7'; Lang (yellow card) 14'	Stadium: Toughsheet Community Stadium; Attendance: 25,738; Referee: Anthony Backhouse

16 April 2024 40	Bolton Wanderers	2–2	Shrewsbury Town	Bolton
19:45 BST	Jerome 40'; Maghoma 71'	Report	Udoh 21'; Marosi (yellow card) 40'; Shipley 43'; Bennett (yellow card) 85'	Stadium: Toughsheet Community Stadium; Attendance: 19,974; Referee: Scott Oldham
Note: Fixture was originally scheduled for 23 March, but was postponed due to international call-ups.

20 April 2024 45	Bolton Wanderers	2–0	Port Vale	Bolton
15:00 BST	Maghoma (yellow card) 70'; Charles (yellow card) 70'; Collins 72'; Toal (yellow card) 79'; Jerome 90+3'	Report	Garrity (yellow card) 70'	Stadium: Toughsheet Community Stadium; Attendance: 22,311; Referee: Charles Breakspear

27 April 2024 46	Peterborough United	3–3	Bolton Wanderers	Peterborough
12:30 BST	Mothersille 50', 79'; Randall 67', (yellow card) 87'	Report	Dempsey 4'; Charles 8' (pen.); Dacres-Cogley (yellow card) 58'; Thomason (yellow card) 61'; Toal (yellow card) 73'; Jerome 82'	Stadium: London Road Stadium; Referee: Bobby Madley

==== Play-offs ====
Bolton Wanderers finished 3rd in the regular 2023–24 EFL League One season, so were drawn against 6th placed Barnsley in the Play-off Semi Final for the second season in a row. The first leg took place at Oakwell and the second leg took place at Toughsheet Community Stadium. Bolton advanced 5-4 on aggregate to face Oxford United in the final for promotion to the EFL Championship.

3 May 2024 Semi-Final First leg	Barnsley	1–3	Bolton Wanderers	Barnsley
19:30 BST	Phillips (yellow card) 18'; Connell (yellow card) 58'; Cosgrove 76'	Report	Charles 23', 53' (pen.); Maghoma (yellow card) 41'; Thomason (yellow card) 45+3'; Dacres-Cogley (yellow card) 80'; Williams 90+4'; Toal (yellow card) 90+7'	Stadium: Oakwell; Attendance: 13,846; Referee: Will Finnie

7 May 2024 Semi-Final Second leg	Bolton Wanderers	2–3 (5–4 agg.)	Barnsley	Bolton
20:00 BST	Collins 43'; Toal 45+1'; Thomason (yellow card) 45+2'	Report	Cosgrove 36', 76'; O'Keeffe (yellow card) 63'; Phillips 64', (yellow card) 69'; Williams (yellow card) 90+1'	Stadium: Toughsheet Community Stadium; Attendance: 24,518; Referee: Oliver Langford

18 May 2024 Final	Bolton Wanderers	0–2	Oxford United	Wembley
16:15 BST	Jones (yellow card) 47'; Dempsey (yellow card) 68'; Baxter (yellow card) 72'; Thomason (yellow card) 77'	Report	Murphy 31', 42'; Goodrham (yellow card) 90+8'	Stadium: Wembley Stadium; Attendance: 70,472; Referee: Sam Barrott

=== FA Cup ===
Bolton were drawn at home against Solihull Moors in the first round. Bolton were drawn at home against Harrogate Town in the second round. Bolton were drawn away to Luton Town in the third round.

Win Draw Loss Fixtures

4 November 2023 First round	Bolton Wanderers	4–0	Solihull Moors	Bolton
15:00 GMT	Santos 39'; Maghoma 52'; Forrester 69'; Jerome (yellow card) 78'; Charles 87'	Report	Labadie (yellow card) 15'; Craig (yellow card) 42'; Osborne (yellow card) 80' (yellow-red card) 90+6'	Stadium: Toughsheet Community Stadium; Attendance: 5,523; Referee: Scott Simpson

2 December 2023 Second round	Bolton Wanderers	5–1	Harrogate Town	Bolton
15:00 GMT	Böðvarsson 9', 33', 43'; Nlundulu 49', 52'; Mendes Gomes (yellow card) 64'; Jones (yellow card) 81'	Report	Thomson 45', (yellow card) 75'	Stadium: Toughsheet Community Stadium; Attendance: 5,703; Referee: Tony Harrington

7 January 2024 Third round	Luton Town	0–0	Bolton Wanderers	Luton
14:00 GMT	Clark (yellow card) 90+1'	Report		Stadium: Kenilworth Road; Attendance: 10,739; Referee: Andrew Madley

16 January 2024 Third round replay	Bolton Wanderers	1–2	Luton Town	Bolton
19:45 GMT	Charles 11'; Forrester (yellow card) 27'	Report	Chong 15'; Mengi (yellow card) 31'; Ogbene 57'; Clark (yellow card) 64'	Stadium: Toughsheet Community Stadium; Attendance: 10,878; Referee: Thomas Bramall

=== EFL Cup ===
Bolton were drawn at home against Barrow, Manager Ian Evatt's former team, in the first round. Bolton were drawn at home against Middlesbrough in the second round, a rematch of the 2004 Football League Cup final.

Win Draw Loss Fixtures

8 August 2023 First round	Bolton Wanderers	1–0	Barrow	Bolton
19:45 BST	Thomason (yellow card) 32'; Ashworth 44'; Mendes Gomes (yellow card) 60'; Coleman (yellow card) 90+3'	Report	Ray (yellow card) 43'; Feely (yellow card) 67'; Spence (yellow card) 71'	Stadium: Toughsheet Community Stadium; Attendance: 4,871; Referee: Anthony Backhouse

29 August 2023 Second round	Bolton Wanderers	1–3	Middlesbrough	Bolton
19:45 BST	Charles 23'; Forrester (yellow card) 51'; Thomason (yellow card) 58'; Iredale (yellow card) 70'; Ashworth (yellow card) 90+2'	Report	Crooks 33', (yellow card) 48'; Jones (yellow card) 47'; McGree 90+1'; Rogers 90+4'	Stadium: Toughsheet Community Stadium; Attendance: 8,624; Referee: Stephen Martin

=== EFL Trophy ===
On 21 June, the initial group stage draw was made as Bolton were drawn into Northern Group E alongside Stockport County and Salford City. On 22 June, Manchester United U21 were drawn to complete the group. On 24 November, the second round draw was made as Bolton were drawn at home to Port Vale. On 8 December, Bolton were confirmed to face Accrington Stanley in the round of 16. In the quarter-finals, Bolton were drawn away to Blackpool.

Pos	Div	Team	Pld	W	PW	PL	L	GF	GA	GD	Pts	Qualification
1	L1	Bolton Wanderers	3	3	0	0	0	13	1	+12	9	Advance to Round 2
2	L2	Stockport County	3	1	0	1	1	4	4	0	4	Advance to Round 2
3	L2	Salford City	3	1	0	0	2	5	9	−4	3	
4	ACA	Manchester United U21	3	0	1	0	2	5	13	−8	2	

Updated to match(es) played on 14 November 2023. Source: EFL.com

Win Draw Loss Fixtures

5 September 2023 Group game 1	Bolton Wanderers	3–0	Salford City	Bolton
19:45 BST	Mendes Gomes 1'; Santos 12'; Morley 53'; Matheson (yellow card) 90+7'	Report	Berkoe (yellow card) 45'	Stadium: Toughsheet Community Stadium; Attendance: 2,983; Referee: Aaron Jackson

26 September 2023 Group game 2	Bolton Wanderers	8–1	Manchester United U21	Bolton
19:45 BST	Nlundulu 19', 48'; Sheehan 22', 38'; Jones 41'; Böðvarsson 64'; Khumbeni 74'; Matheson 84'	Report	Shoretire (yellow card) 63'; Forson 67'	Stadium: Toughsheet Community Stadium; Attendance: 3,007; Referee: Scott Jackson

14 November 2023 Group game 3	Stockport County	0–2	Bolton Wanderers	Stockport
19:30 GMT	Pond (yellow card) 45+2'	Report	Böðvarsson 37', 45+1'; Thomason (yellow card) 88'	Stadium: Edgeley Park; Attendance: 3,427; Referee: Scott Oldham

5 December 2023 Round of 32	Bolton Wanderers	2–0	Port Vale	Bolton
19:45 GMT	Charles 9'; Thomason (yellow card) 60'; Mendes Gomes 64'	Report	Iacovitti (yellow card) 57'	Stadium: Toughsheet Community Stadium; Attendance: 2,150; Referee: Matthew Corlett

10 January 2024 Round of 16	Accrington Stanley	1–3	Bolton Wanderers	Accrington
19:30 GMT	Henderson 37'; Martin (yellow card) 51'; Woods (yellow card) 71'; O'Brien (yellow card) 74'; Hills (yellow card) 87'	Report	Jerome 15'; Morley 29' (pen.); Dempsey 83'	Stadium: Wham Stadium; Attendance: 3,441; Referee: Marc Edwards

30 January 2024 Quarter-Final	Blackpool	0–0 (5–4 p)	Bolton Wanderers	Blackpool
19:00 GMT	Connolly (yellow card) 27'	Report	Santos (yellow card) 5'; Thomason (yellow card) 87'	Stadium: Bloomfield Road; Attendance: 5,649; Referee: Seb Stockbridge
	Penalties
	Hamilton (penalty scored); Connolly (penalty scored); Norburn (penalty missed); Lawrence-Gabriel (penalty missed); Dembélé (penalty scored); Kouassi (penalty scored); Pennington (penalty scored)		Morley (penalty scored); Charles (penalty missed); Böðvarsson (penalty missed); Mendes Gomes (penalty scored); Thomason (penalty scored); Dacres-Cogley (penalty scored); Ashworth (penalty missed)

== Statistics ==
As of match played 18 May 2024

No.	Pos	Nat	Player	Total		League One		FA Cup		EFL Cup		EFL Trophy		Play-Offs	
No.	Pos	Nat	Player	Apps	Goals	Apps	Goals	Apps	Goals	Apps	Goals	Apps	Goals	Apps	Goals
Goalkeepers
1	GK	(England) ENG	Nathan Baxter	43	0	33+0	0	4+0	0	0+1	0	2+0	0	3+0	0
13	GK	(England) ENG	Joel Coleman	19	0	13+0	0	0+0	0	2+0	0	4+0	0	0+0	0
Defenders
2	DF	(Australia) AUS	Gethin Jones	44	2	34+0	1	2+0	0	1+1	0	2+1	1	3+0	0
3	DF	(Australia) AUS	Jack Iredale	43	3	23+8	3	2+1	0	2+0	0	6+0	0	0+1	0
5	DF	(Portugal) POR	Ricardo Santos	45	2	34+0	0	4+0	1	1+0	0	3+0	1	3+0	0
12	DF	(England) ENG	Josh Dacres-Cogley	55	3	44+0	3	2+0	0	1+1	0	2+2	0	3+0	0
15	DF	(England) ENG	Will Forrester	24	1	9+5	0	4+0	1	2+0	0	4+0	0	0+0	0
17	DF	(England) ENG	Nathanael Ogbeta	17	2	12+3	2	0+0	0	0+0	0	1+0	0	1+0	0
18	DF	(Northern Ireland) NIR	Eoin Toal	51	5	40+0	4	2+1	0	1+0	0	4+0	0	3+0	1
20	DF	(Scotland) SCO	Calvin Ramsay	4	0	1+2	0	0+0	0	0+0	0	1+0	0	0+0	0
21	DF	(England) ENG	Caleb Taylor	7	0	4+3	0	0+0	0	0+0	0	0+0	0	0+0	0
26	DF	(Wales) WAL	Zac Ashworth	23	3	6+10	2	1+1	0	2+0	1	2+1	0	0+0	0
27	DF	(England) ENG	Randell Williams	40	4	23+9	3	3+0	0	0+0	0	3+0	0	2+0	1
45	DF	(Northern Ireland) NIR	Sam Inwood	1	0	0+0	0	0+0	0	0+0	0	0+1	0	0+0	0
Midfielders
4	MF	(England) ENG	George Thomason	52	6	37+2	6	2+1	0	2+0	0	3+2	0	3+0	0
7	MF	(Guinea-Bissau) GBS	Carlos Mendes Gomes	23	4	3+13	2	1+1	0	2+0	0	2+1	2	0+0	0
8	MF	(Wales) WAL	Josh Sheehan	51	4	37+4	2	2+1	0	1+0	0	1+2	2	3+0	0
16	MF	(England) ENG	Aaron Morley	50	5	10+27	3	2+2	0	1+1	0	6+0	2	0+1	0
19	MF	(England) ENG	Paris Maghoma	50	9	28+9	8	3+1	1	1+1	0	4+0	0	3+0	0
22	MF	(England) ENG	Kyle Dempsey	51	4	24+17	3	2+0	0	0+2	0	2+1	1	0+3	0
48	MF	(Egypt) EGY	Sonny Sharples-Ahmed	1	0	0+0	0	0+0	0	0+0	0	0+1	0	0+0	0
Forwards
9	FW	(Iceland) ISL	Jón Daði Böðvarsson	46	10	11+25	4	2+2	3	0+1	0	5+0	3	0+0	0
10	FW	(Northern Ireland) NIR	Dion Charles	44	20	31+2	14	2+2	2	1+1	1	1+1	1	3+0	2
11	FW	(England) ENG	Dan Nlundulu	28	5	3+18	1	2+0	2	1+0	0	3+1	2	0+0	0
14	FW	(Nigeria) NGR	Victor Adeboyejo	46	10	28+7	10	2+1	0	0+1	0	1+3	0	0+3	0
28	FW	(Wales) WAL	Aaron Collins	22	9	14+5	8	0+0	0	0+0	0	0+0	0	3+0	1
35	FW	(England) ENG	Cameron Jerome	43	4	2+28	3	0+3	0	1+0	0	2+4	1	0+3	0
Player(s) out on loan
38	MF	(Malawi) MAW	Nelson Khumbeni	1	1	0+0	0	0+0	0	0+0	0	0+1	1	0+0	0
41	DF	(England) ENG	Luke Matheson	5	1	0+0	0	0+1	0	0+0	0	2+2	1	0+0	0

=== Goals record ===
As of match played 7 May 2024

Rank	No.	Nat.	Po.	Name	League One	FA Cup	EFL Cup	EFL Trophy	Play-Offs	Total
1	10	(Northern Ireland)	CF	Dion Charles	14	2	1	1	2	20
2	9	(Iceland)	CF	Jón Daði Böðvarsson	4	3	0	3	0	10
2	14	(Nigeria)	CF	Victor Adeboyejo	10	0	0	0	0	10
4	19	(England)	CM	Paris Maghoma	8	1	0	0	0	9
4	28	(Wales)	CF	Aaron Collins	8	0	0	0	1	9
6	4	(England)	CM	George Thomason	6	0	0	0	0	6
7	11	(England)	CF	Dan Nlundulu	1	2	0	2	0	5
7	16	(England)	CM	Aaron Morley	3	0	0	2	0	5
7	18	(Northern Ireland)	CB	Eoin Toal	4	0	0	0	1	5
10	7	(Guinea-Bissau)	AM	Carlos Mendes Gomes	2	0	0	2	0	4
10	8	(Wales)	CM	Josh Sheehan	2	0	0	2	0	4
10	22	(England)	CM	Kyle Dempsey	3	0	0	1	0	4
10	27	(England)	LB	Randell Williams	3	0	0	0	1	4
10	35	(England)	CF	Cameron Jerome	3	0	0	1	0	4
15	3	(Australia)	CB	Jack Iredale	3	0	0	0	0	3
15	12	(England)	RB	Josh Dacres-Cogley	3	0	0	0	0	3
15	26	(Wales)	LB	Zac Ashworth	2	0	1	0	0	3
18	2	(Australia)	CB	Gethin Jones	1	0	0	1	0	2
18	5	(Portugal)	CB	Ricardo Santos	0	1	0	1	0	2
18	17	(England)	LB	Nathanael Ogbeta	2	0	0	0	0	2
21	15	(England)	CB	Will Forrester	0	1	0	0	0	1
21	38	(Malawi)	CM	Nelson Khumbeni	0	0	0	1	0	1
21	41	(England)	RB	Luke Matheson	0	0	0	1	0	1
Own Goals					4	0	0	0	0	4
Total					86	10	2	18	5	121

=== Disciplinary record ===
As of match played 18 May 2024

Rank	No.	Nat.	Po.	Name	League One			FA Cup			EFL Cup			EFL Trophy			Play-Offs			Total		
Rank	No.	Nat.	Po.	Name	Yellow card	(yellow card) (yellow-red card)	Red card	Yellow card	(yellow card) (yellow-red card)	Red card	Yellow card	(yellow card) (yellow-red card)	Red card	Yellow card	(yellow card) (yellow-red card)	Red card	Yellow card	(yellow card) (yellow-red card)	Red card	Yellow card	(yellow card) (yellow-red card)	Red card
1	4	(England)	CM	George Thomason	14	0	1	0	0	0	2	0	0	3	0	0	3	0	0	22	0	1
2	5	(Portugal)	CB	Ricardo Santos	4	0	2	0	0	0	0	0	0	1	0	0	0	0	0	5	0	2
2	8	(Wales)	CM	Josh Sheehan	11	0	0	0	0	0	0	0	0	0	0	0	0	0	0	11	0	0
4	19	(England)	CM	Paris Maghoma	9	0	0	0	0	0	0	0	0	0	0	0	1	0	0	10	0	0
5	2	(Australia)	CB	Gethin Jones	4	0	1	1	0	0	0	0	0	0	0	0	1	0	0	6	0	1
5	18	(Northern Ireland)	CB	Eoin Toal	5	1	0	0	0	0	0	0	0	0	0	0	1	0	0	6	1	0
7	3	(Australia)	CB	Jack Iredale	7	0	0	0	0	0	1	0	0	0	0	0	0	0	0	8	0	0
8	22	(England)	CM	Kyle Dempsey	6	0	0	0	0	0	0	0	0	0	0	0	1	0	0	7	0	0
9	1	(England)	GK	Nathan Baxter	5	0	0	0	0	0	0	0	0	0	0	0	1	0	0	6	0	0
9	12	(England)	RB	Josh Dacres-Cogley	5	0	0	0	0	0	0	0	0	0	0	0	1	0	0	6	0	0
9	35	(England)	CF	Cameron Jerome	5	0	0	1	0	0	0	0	0	0	0	0	0	0	0	6	0	0
12	10	(Northern Ireland)	CF	Dion Charles	2	1	0	0	0	0	0	0	0	0	0	0	0	0	0	2	1	0
13	7	(Guinea-Bissau)	AM	Carlos Mendes Gomes	2	0	0	1	0	0	1	0	0	0	0	0	0	0	0	4	0	0
14	14	(Nigeria)	CF	Victor Adeboyejo	3	0	0	0	0	0	0	0	0	0	0	0	0	0	0	3	0	0
14	15	(England)	CB	Will Forrester	1	0	0	1	0	0	1	0	0	0	0	0	0	0	0	3	0	0
14	27	(England)	LB	Randell Williams	3	0	0	0	0	0	0	0	0	0	0	0	0	0	0	3	0	0
17	13	(England)	GK	Joel Coleman	1	0	0	0	0	0	1	0	0	0	0	0	0	0	0	2	0	0
17	16	(England)	CM	Aaron Morley	2	0	0	0	0	0	0	0	0	0	0	0	0	0	0	2	0	0
17	17	(England)	LB	Nathanael Ogbeta	2	0	0	0	0	0	0	0	0	0	0	0	0	0	0	2	0	0
17	26	(Wales)	LB	Zac Ashworth	1	0	0	0	0	0	1	0	0	0	0	0	0	0	0	2	0	0
21	11	(England)	CF	Dan Nlundulu	1	0	0	0	0	0	0	0	0	0	0	0	0	0	0	1	0	0
21	41	(England)	RB	Luke Matheson	0	0	0	0	0	0	0	0	0	1	0	0	0	0	0	1	0	0
Total					95	2	4	4	0	0	7	0	0	5	0	0	9	0	0	120	2	4
