= Arran Pettifer =

English footballer

Personal information
- Full name: Arran James Pettifer
- Date of birth: 1 October 2003 (age 23)
- Place of birth: Stockport, England
- Position: Midfielder

Team information
- Current team: Matlock Town

Youth career
- 2010–2022: Bolton Wanderers

Senior career*
Years	Team	Apps	(Gls)
2021–2024	Bolton Wanderers	0	(0)
2022–2023	→ Atherton Collieries (loan)	31	(2)
2023	→ Warrington Town (loan)	6	(0)
2024	St Patrick's Athletic	0	(0)
2024–2025	Cliftonville	20	(0)
2025–2026	Arbroath	11	(1)
2026	Kelty Hearts	14	(2)
2026	Alloa Athletic	0	(0)
2026	FC United of Manchester	7	(0)
2026	Hyde United	4	(0)
2026–	Matlock Town	4	(0)
- * Club domestic league appearances and goals as of 23:24, 12 November 2026

Arran James Pettifer (born 1 October 2003) is an English footballer who plays as a midfielder for Northern Premier League Divison One East side Matlock Town.

== Career ==
Pettifer came through the Bolton Wanderers Academy, which he joined at the age of seven.

Pettifer made his Bolton debut on 5 October 2021 in a 4–1 victory against Liverpool U21's in the EFL Trophy, coming on in the 72nd minute as a substitute for Josh Sheehan. On 30 November 2021, he made his first appearance against a professional team in a 1–0 victory against Fleetwood Town, also in the EFL Trophy, coming on in the 70th minute as a substitute for the game's goalscorer Kieran Lee.

On 13 June 2022, Pettifer became one of the five Academy graduates that signed their first professional contracts with Bolton.

On 26 August 2022, Pettifer joined Northern Premier League Premier Division club Atherton Collieries on a short-term loan deal alongside teammate Finlay Lockett. The loan was later extended until January 2023 and then February. On 25 May 2023, he signed a new one-year deal with the option for an extra year. 18 August 2023 he signed for Warrington Town on loan for a month.

On 2 February 2024, Pettifer left Bolton after 14 years with the club, signing on a permanent basis for League of Ireland Premier Division club St Patrick's Athletic. He made his debut the following day in a Leinster Senior Cup game away to St Mochta's in which he was sent off in the 41st minute for a last man foul in his own box. That proved to be his only senior appearance for the club, as he joined NIFL Premiership side Cliftonville on 30 August 2024. On 29 May 2025, it was confirmed that he had departed Cliftonville following the end of his contract, after scoring 1 goal in 27 appearances for the club.

On 4 July 2025, he signed a one year contract with Scottish Championship club Arbroath. On 22 July 2025, he scored his first goals for the club, with a first half Hat-trick in a 6–0 win over Annan Athletic in the Scottish League Cup.

On 14 January 2026, he moved to Scottish League One club Kelty Hearts.

In July 2026, he made 3 appearances in the Scottish League Cup during a short-term ultimately unsuccessful trial period with Alloa Athletic. In August 2026, he signed for FC United of Manchester where he only spent a month before joining Hyde United in September 2026, again leaving after a month, this time to join Matlock Town on 16 October 2026.

== Career statistics ==
As of match played 31 October 2026

Appearances and goals by club, season and competition
Club	Season	League			National Cup (Note: Includes FA Cup, FAI Cup, Irish Cup & Scottish Cup)		League Cup (Note: Includes EFL Cup, Northern Ireland Football League Cup & Scottish League Cup)		Other		Total	
Club	Season	Division	Apps	Goals	Apps	Goals	Apps	Goals	Apps	Goals	Apps	Goals
Bolton Wanderers	2021–22	League One	0	0	0	0	0	0	2 (Note: Appearance(s) in the EFL Trophy)	0	2	0
Bolton Wanderers	2022–23	League One	0	0	0	0	0	0	0	0	0	0
Bolton Wanderers	2023–24	League One	0	0	0	0	0	0	0	0	0	0
Bolton Wanderers	Total		0	0	0	0	0	0	2	0	2	0
Atherton Collieries (loan)	2022–23	Northern Premier League Premier Division	31	2	1	0	—		4 (Note: One appearance in the FA Trophy, three appearances in the Lancashire FA Challenge Trophy)	0	36	2
Warrington Town (loan)	2023–24	National League North	6	0	0	0	—		0	0	6	0
St Patrick's Athletic	2024	League of Ireland Premier Division	0	0	0	0	—		1 (Note: Appearance in the Leinster Senior Cup)	0	1	0
Cliftonville	2024–25	NIFL Premiership	20	0	3	1	2	0	1 (Note: Appearance in the County Antrim Shield)	0	26	1
Arbroath	2025–26	Scottish Championship	11	1	0	0	4	3	1 (Note: Appearances in the Scottish Challenge Cup)	1	16	5
Kelty Hearts	2025–26	Scottish League One	14	2	2	0	–		–		16	2
Alloa Athletic	2026–27	Scottish League One	–		–		3	0	–		3	0
FC United of Manchester	2026–27	Northern Premier League Premier Division	7	0	–		–		–		7	0
Hyde United	2026–27	Northern Premier League Premier Division	4	0	–		–		–		4	0
Matlock Town	2026–27	Northern Premier League Division One East	4	0	–		–		0	0	4	0
Career total			97	5	6	1	9	3	9	1	121	10
