= Will Forrester =

English footballer

- Forrester playing for Leyton Orient in 2026

Personal information
- Full name: William Samuel Forrester
- Date of birth: 29 June 2001 (age 25)
- Place of birth: Alsager, England
- Height: 1.80 m (5 ft 11 in)
- Position: Defender

Team information
- Current team: Leyton Orient
- Number: 6

Youth career
- 2007–2021: Stoke City

Senior career*
Years	Team	Apps	(Gls)
2021–2022	Stoke City	4	(1)
2021	→ Mansfield Town (loan)	4	(0)
2022–2023	Port Vale	35	(2)
2023–2026	Bolton Wanderers	37	(0)
2026–	Leyton Orient	27	(2)
- * Club domestic league appearances and goals as of 12:05, 22 November 2026 (UTC)

William Samuel Forrester (born 29 June 2001) is an English professional footballer who plays as a defender for EFL League One club Leyton Orient.

Forrester made his professional debut at Stoke City in May 2021 and spent time on loan at Mansfield Town before signing with Port Vale in July 2022. He was sold to Bolton Wanderers in July 2023. He spent two-and-a-half seasons at the club before he moved on to Leyton Orient.

== Career ==
=== Stoke City ===
Forrester was born in Alsager and joined at the Stoke City academy at the age of six. He progressed through the youth teams at Stoke, and made his senior debut on 9 October 2018, playing for the U21s in the EFL Trophy against Morecambe. Forrester made his professional debut on 8 May 2021, scoring the opening goal on the final day of the 2020–21 season in a 2–0 away win against AFC Bournemouth in the Championship. On 31 August 2021, Forrester joined League Two side Mansfield Town on loan until January 2022. Forrester's time at Field Mill was hampered by an ankle injury which restricted him to seven appearances. Despite this, manager Nigel Clough still asked Stoke to extend the loan until the end of the campaign. After returning to Stoke, Forrester made three first-team appearances at the end of the 2021–22 season. Manager Michael O'Neill praised his composure on the ball and patience for waiting for game time in April 2022. However, Forrester was sold just three months later, and O'Neill explained that it was because he refused to sign a long-term contract. The club already had 20-year-old centre-back Connor Taylor who also needed game time to develop.

=== Port Vale ===
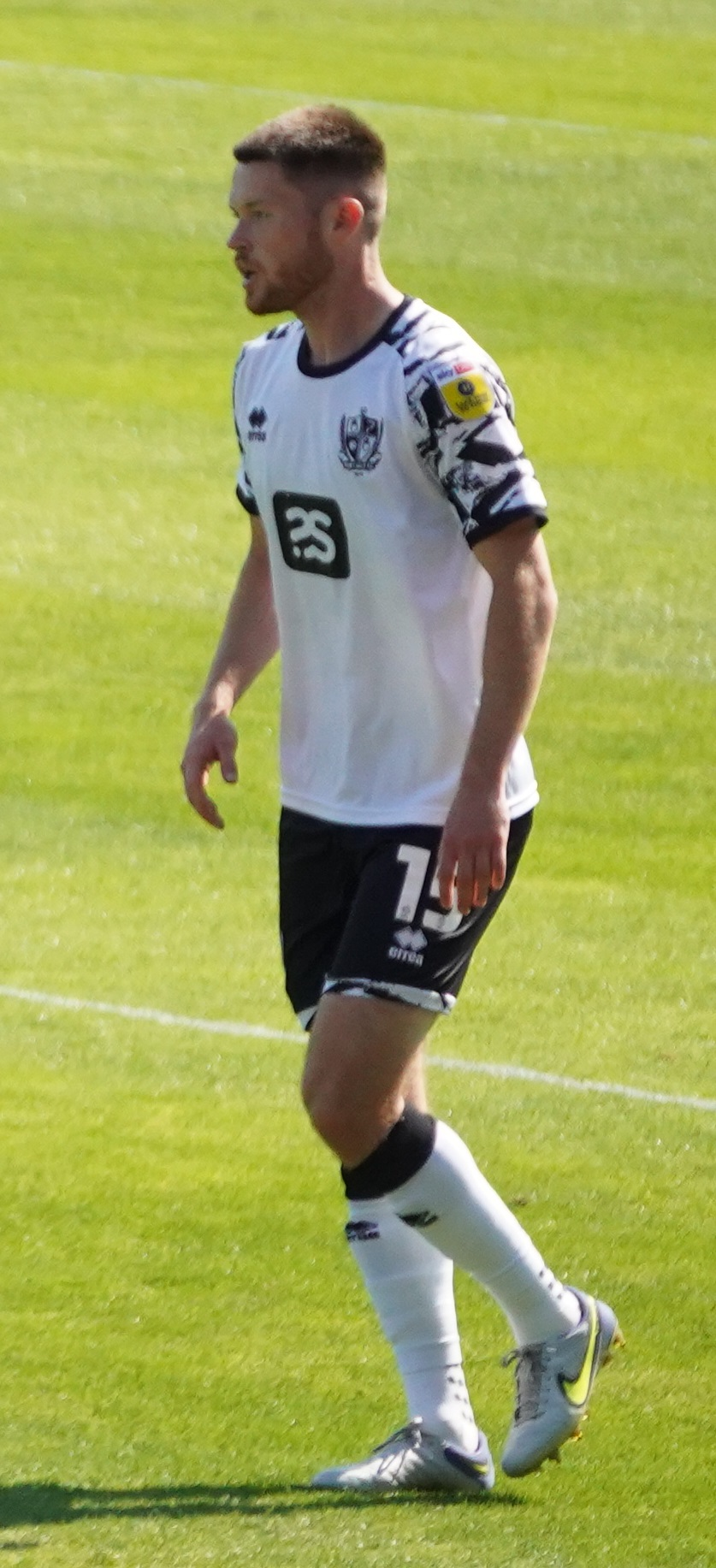
Forrester playing for Port Vale in 2022

On 26 July 2022, Forrester joined League One side Port Vale for an undisclosed fee. It was the first transfer between Stoke and Vale since 1978. He started the 2022–23 season playing on the right of a back three, though also impressed playing in the centre of the three. He was voted as Player of the Match for his performance in a 2–1 win at Derby County on 8 October, and went on to win the club's Player of the Month award. He was again voted as the club's Player of the Month for February, having featured in six of Vale's seven games, and admitted it was tough to experience a large number of games in a condensed period for the first time in his career.

=== Bolton Wanderers ===
On 4 July 2023, Bolton Wanderers announced that Forrester had joined the club on a three-year deal for an undisclosed fee (reported to be £250,000). He enjoyed a run in the first XI after Gethin Jones departed on international duty, earning plaudits for his performances, before he was sidelined with a hamstring injury in January. He was an unused substitute in the 2024 League One play-off final defeat to Oxford United.

Forrester suffered a fall at home in August 2024, breaking his toe and dislocating another, which left him sidelined for some weeks. He considered leaving the club in the January transfer window as he was not a regular starter until manager Ian Evatt was replaced by Steven Schumacher. At that point, he enjoyed a run of games following an injury to Ricardo Santos. He was named Bolton's Player of the Month for February.

Barnsley were reported to have targeted Forrester during the 2025 summer window, and they maintained their interest despite missing out on a deadline day deal. He missed the start of the 2025–26 season with a long-term hamstring injury. He returned to fitness in November, though was told to "join the queue" by Schumacher as the defence was looking strong with the team near the top of the table.

=== Leyton Orient ===
On 7 January 2026, Forrester joined League One club Leyton Orient on a two-and-a-half-year deal for an undisclosed fee. Orient head coach Richie Wellens said that "he will bring a new dimension to our defence" because he was a "progressive passer who can help start attacks from deep". He was named club captain following the departure of Omar Beckles. He played 17 games in the second half of the 2025–26 season, and then lost the captaincy to new signing Isaac Hayden.

== Style of play ==
Forrester is a versatile defender and plays as a centre-back, left-back, or right-back.

== Career statistics ==
As of match played 21 November 2026

Appearances and goals by club, season and competition
Club	Season	League			FA Cup		EFL Cup		Other		Total	
Club	Season	Division	Apps	Goals	Apps	Goals	Apps	Goals	Apps	Goals	Apps	Goals
Stoke City U21	2018–19	—			—		—		1 (Note: Appearances in the EFL Trophy.)	0	1	0
Stoke City	2020–21	Championship	1	1	0	0	0	0	—		1	1
Stoke City	2021–22	Championship	3	0	0	0	0	0	—		3	0
Stoke City	Total		4	1	0	0	0	0	0	0	4	1
Mansfield Town (loan)	2021–22	League Two	4	0	2	1	—		1	0	7	1
Port Vale	2022–23	League One	35	2	0	0	1	0	2	0	38	2
Bolton Wanderers	2023–24	League One	14	0	4	1	2	0	4	0	24	1
Bolton Wanderers	2024–25	League One	23	0	1	0	0	0	3	0	27	0
Bolton Wanderers	2025–26	League One	0	0	0	0	0	0	2	0	2	0
Bolton Wanderers	Total		37	0	5	1	2	0	9	0	53	1
Leyton Orient	2025–26	League One	17	1	0	0	—		—		17	1
Leyton Orient	2026–27	League One	10	1	0	0	2	0	3	0	15	1
Leyton Orient	Total		27	2	0	0	2	0	3	0	32	2
Career total			107	5	7	2	5	0	16	0	135	7
