= Paris Maghoma =

English footballer (born 2001)

Personal information
- Full name: Edmond-Paris Maghoma
- Date of birth: 8 May 2001 (age 25)
- Place of birth: Enfield, England
- Height: 1.81 m (5 ft 11 in)
- Position: Central midfielder

Team information
- Current team: Norwich City
- Number: 25

Youth career
- –2020: Tottenham Hotspur
- 2020–2022: Brentford

Senior career*
Years	Team	Apps	(Gls)
2022–2026	Brentford	8	(0)
2022–2023	→ AFC Wimbledon (loan)	18	(0)
2023	→ Milton Keynes Dons (loan)	20	(1)
2023–2024	→ Bolton Wanderers (loan)	37	(8)
2026–	Norwich City	25	(6)

International career
- England U15
- England U16
2018–2019	England U18	6	(1)
2019	England U19	6	(0)
2020	England U20	1	(0)
- * Club domestic league appearances and goals as of 09:09, 22 November 2026 (UTC)

Edmond-Paris Maghoma (born 8 May 2001) is an English professional footballer who plays as a central midfielder for EFL Championship club Norwich City. He is a product of the Tottenham Hotspur academy and was capped by England at youth level.

== Club career ==
=== Tottenham Hotspur ===
A central midfielder, Maghoma began his career in the academy at Tottenham Hotspur. He progressed to sign a scholarship deal at the end of the 2016–17 season and progressed through the club's U18 team to the Development Squad. Maghoma made two appearances and scored one goal during the U21 team's 2018–19 EFL Trophy campaign. He departed White Hart Lane in January 2020.

=== Brentford ===
On 16 January 2020, Maghoma signed an 18-month contract with the B team of Championship club Brentford for an undisclosed fee. In what remained of the 2019–20 season, he made 10 appearances and scored one goal. Maghoma was included in the first team group for the 2020–21 pre-season and was an unused substitute on the opening day of the regular season. At the end of an injury hit 2020–21 season, he signed a new one-year contract, with the option of a further year. Maghoma returned fit for the 2021–22 pre-season and with the first team now playing Premier League football, a midfield injury crisis saw him win a number of first team call-ups between October and December 2021. On 10 January 2022, it was announced that he had signed a new 3 1/2-year contract. Maghoma was a part of the B team's 2021–22 London Senior Cup-winning squad and was promoted into the first team squad at the end of the campaign.

In July 2022, Maghoma joined League Two club AFC Wimbledon on loan for the duration of the 2022–23 season. He made the first competitive appearance of his career on the opening day of the season, with a start in a 2–0 victory over Gillingham. Following 24 appearances, Maghoma was sidelined by an ankle injury suffered in training in mid-December, which led to his recall from the loan on 5 January 2023. 18 days later, he joined League One club Milton Keynes Dons on loan until the end of the 2022–23 season.

On 31 July 2023, he moved on loan to Bolton Wanderers.

=== Norwich City ===
On 26 January 2026, Maghoma joined Championship club Norwich City, signing a three-and-a-half-year for an undisclosed fee.

== International career ==
Maghoma was capped by England at U15, U16, U18, U19 and U20 levels.

In September 2026, he was called-up by the DR Congo national team.

== Personal life ==
Maghoma grew up in Finchley and attended Finchley Catholic High School. He is of DR Congo descent and his brothers Jacques and Christian are both footballers.

== Career statistics ==
As of match played 21 November 2026

Appearances and goals by club, season and competition
Club	Season	League			FA Cup		League Cup		Other		Total	
Club	Season	Division	Apps	Goals	Apps	Goals	Apps	Goals	Apps	Goals	Apps	Goals
Tottenham Hotspur U21	2018–19	―							2 (Note: Appearance(s) in the EFL Trophy.)	1	2	1
Brentford	2022–23	Premier League	0	0	0	0	0	0	—		0	0
Brentford	2023–24	Premier League	0	0	0	0	0	0	—		0	0
Brentford	2024–25	Premier League	8	0	1	0	1	0	—		10	0
Brentford	2025–26	Premier League	0	0	0	0	0	0	—		0	0
Brentford	Total		8	0	1	0	1	0	0	0	10	0
AFC Wimbledon (loan)	2022–23	League Two	18	0	3	0	1	0	2	0	24	0
Milton Keynes Dons (loan)	2022–23	League One	20	1	0	0	0	0	0	0	20	1
Bolton Wanderers (loan)	2023–24	League One	37	8	4	1	2	0	7 (Note: Four appearances in EFL Trophy, three appearances in League One play-offs)	0	50	9
Norwich City	2025–26	Championship	14	1	2	1	0	0	—		16	2
Norwich City	2026–27	Championship	11	5	0	0	2	0	—		13	5
Norwich City	Total		25	6	2	1	2	0	0	0	29	7
Career total			108	15	10	2	6	0	11	1	135	18

== Honours ==
Brentford B

- London Senior Cup: 2021–22

Individual

- Tournoi Européen de Baisieux Player of the Tournament: 2018
