= Jack Iredale =

Australian soccer player (born 1996)

Personal information
- Full name: Jack Henry Stewart Iredale
- Date of birth: 2 May 1996 (age 30)
- Place of birth: Greenock, Scotland
- Height: 1.84 m (6 ft 0 in)
- Position: Defender

Team information
- Current team: Hibernian
- Number: 15

Youth career
- AIS
- 2016–2017: Perth Glory

Senior career*
Years	Team	Apps	(Gls)
2016–2017	Perth Glory NPL	23	(2)
2017	ECU Joondalup	4	(1)
2017–2019	Greenock Morton	37	(3)
2017–2018	→ Queen's Park (loan)	14	(1)
2019–2020	Carlisle United	22	(2)
2020–2022	Cambridge United	73	(5)
2022–2024	Bolton Wanderers	51	(3)
2024–	Hibernian	62	(1)

International career
2012	Australia U17	5	(0)
- * Club domestic league appearances and goals as of 20 May 2026

Jack Henry Stewart Iredale (born 2 May 1996) is a professional soccer player who plays as a defender for Scottish Premiership club Hibernian. Born in Scotland, he represented Australia at youth level.

== Early life ==
Iredale was born in Scotland, before moving to New Zealand at the age of one. He lived in New Zealand, where his mother, Fiona represented the country in judo at the 2000 Summer Olympics. He moved to Australia as a ten-year-old. He suffered three anterior cruciate ligament injuries playing football between the ages of 15 and 18.

== Career ==
=== Club ===
Iredale signed with National Premier Leagues Western Australia side ECU Joondalup in May 2017.

In July 2017, Iredale signed with his hometown club, Scottish Championship side, Greenock Morton. Iredale was nominated for SPFA Goal of the Season for a wonder-strike against Dundee United.

He signed a one-year extension in May 2018.

On 7 May 2019, English League Two side Carlisle United announced that they had signed Iredale on a one-year contract for the 2019–20 season.

On 14 August 2020, Iredale signed for Cambridge United. On 4 May 2022, it was announced Iredale would be leaving the club after turning down a new contract.

On 9 May 2022, Iredale signed a three-year contract with Bolton Wanderers, marking their first signing of the transfer window. In January 2023, he was ruled out for the rest of the season due to injury.

Iredale moved to Scottish Premiership club Hibernian in August 2024, signing a two-year contract. He scored his first goal for Hibs on 2 March 2025, a match-winning goal in an Edinburgh derby against Hearts that won the PFA Scotland goal of the season award for 2024–25. He signed a new contract with Hibs in April 2025, which is due to expire in the summer of 2028.

=== International ===
Iredale was selected for a training camp of the full Australia squad in May 2025, ahead of 2026 World Cup qualifiers against Japan and Saudi Arabia.

== Career statistics ==
As of match played 22 February 2026

Appearances and goals by club, season and competition
Club	Season	League			National Cup		League Cup		Other		Total	
Club	Season	Division	Apps	Goals	Apps	Goals	Apps	Goals	Apps	Goals	Apps	Goals
ECU Joondalup	2017	National Premier Leagues	4	2	0	0	0	0	0	0	4	2
Greenock Morton	2017–18	Scottish Championship	9	2	3	1	1	0	1 (Note: Appearance in Scottish Challenge Cup)	0	14	3
Greenock Morton	2018–19	Scottish Championship	28	1	3	0	4	0	1	0	36	1
Greenock Morton	Total		37	3	6	1	5	0	2	0	50	4
Queen's Park (loan)	2017–18	Scottish League One	14	1	0	0	0	0	0	0	14	1
Carlisle United	2019–20	League Two	22	2	3	0	2	0	3 (Note: Appearance(s) in EFL Trophy)	0	30	2
Cambridge United	2020–21	League Two	38	4	1	0	2	0	4	0	45	4
Cambridge United	2021–22	League One	35	1	4	0	2	0	3	0	44	1
Cambridge United	Total		73	5	5	0	4	0	7	0	89	5
Bolton Wanderers	2022–23	League One	19	0	1	0	1	0	4	0	25	0
Bolton Wanderers	2023–24	League One	31	3	3	0	2	0	7 (Note: Six appearances in EFL Trophy, one appearance in League One play-offs)	0	43	3
Bolton Wanderers	2024–25	League One	1	0	0	0	0	0	0	0	1	0
Bolton Wanderers	Total		51	3	4	0	3	0	11	0	69	3
Hibernian F.C.	2024–25	Scottish Premiership	28	1	3	0	0	0	0	0	31	1
Hibernian F.C.	2025–26	Scottish Premiership	27	0	0	0	1	0	6	0	34	0
Hibernian F.C.	Total		55	1	3	0	1	0	6	0	64	1
Career total			256	17	21	1	15	0	29	0	321	18
