= Victor Adeboyejo =

Nigerian footballer (born 1998)

Personal information
- Full name: Ayomide Victor Adeboyejo
- Date of birth: 12 January 1998 (age 28)
- Place of birth: Ibadan, Nigeria
- Height: 1.80 m (5 ft 11 in)
- Position: Striker

Team information
- Current team: Bromley
- Number: 20

Youth career
- Arsenal
- AFC Wimbledon
- Charlton Athletic
- –2014: Leyton Orient

Senior career*
| Years | Team | Apps | (Gls) |
| 2014–2017 | Leyton Orient | 15 | (1) |
| 2015 | → Royston Town (loan) | 5 | (2) |
| 2015 | → Hemel Hempstead Town (loan) | 0 | (0) |
| 2015 | → Heybridge Swifts (loan) | 1 | (0) |
| 2016 | → Dulwich Hamlet (loan) | 2 | (0) |
| 2016 | → Soham Town Rangers (loan) | 6 | (1) |
| 2016 | → Margate (loan) | 3 | (0) |
| 2017–2022 | Barnsley | 78 | (7) |
| 2019–2020 | → Bristol Rovers (loan) | 18 | (1) |
| 2020 | → Cambridge United (loan) | 8 | (0) |
| 2022–2023 | Burton Albion | 26 | (11) |
| 2023–2026 | Bolton Wanderers | 78 | (16) |
| 2026 | Mansfield Town | 14 | (1) |
| 2026– | Bromley | 6 | (4) |
- * Club domestic league appearances and goals as of 17:33, 12 September 2026 (UTC)

Ayomide Victor Adeboyejo (born 12 January 1998) is a Nigerian professional footballer who plays as a striker for EFL League One club Bromley.

== Club career ==
=== Leyton Orient ===
After spells with the academies of Arsenal, AFC Wimbledon and Charlton Athletic, Adeboyejo moved to Orient in the summer of 2014. He performed well in Leyton Orient's U18 side during the early part of the 2014–15 season, scoring 10 goals in 16 appearances, and progressed to the club's reserve team, for which he also scored. He is contracted to Orient until 30 June 2016.

Adeboyejo was first named on Orient's first-team bench for the 2–0 win at Doncaster Rovers on 21 October 2014, and made his senior debut as a substitute for Jobi McAnuff in the 2–1 defeat at home to Peterborough United on 13 December, in manager Fabio Liverani's first match in charge of the club.

In February 2015, Adeboyejo went on a work experience loan to Southern League club Royston Town. He scored on his debut in Royston's 2–0 win at Aylesbury United on 21 February.

On 1 October 2015, Adeboyejo went on a youth loan to Conference South club Hemel Hempstead Town. On 21 October, he moved to Heybridge Swifts and featured in their penalty shoot-out victory at Wivenhoe Town in the Third Round of the Essex Senior Cup on the same day. He subsequently played as a substitute in Swifts' 8–1 home league defeat to Cheshunt on 24 October.

On his return to Orient, he featured as a substitute in the 0–0 FA Cup Second Round draw at home to Scunthorpe United on 5 December.

Ahead of the start of the 2016–17 season, Adeboyejo went on a work experience loan to Isthmian League Premier Division club Dulwich Hamlet.

After making two substitute appearances during his loan spell with Dulwich Hamlet, Adeboyejo joined Soham Town Rangers on loan at the start of September 2016.

On 17 April 2017 Adeboyejo scored his first goal for Leyton Orient in a 2–1 win over Hartlepool United.

=== Barnsley ===
After leaving Leyton Orient in the summer of 2017, Adeboyejo went on trial with Chelsea, playing two games for their under-23s before signing for Barnsley on a three-year deal. He scored on his debut for Barnsley in a 4–0 win over Oxford United on 4 August 2018. In December 2018, Adeboyejo signed a new two-and-a-half-year deal until the summer of 2021. On 23 February 2021, Barnsley triggered a clause in Adeboyejo's contract which saw him sign a new one-year contract extension.

==== Bristol Rovers (loan) ====
On 26 July 2019, Adeboyejo joined Bristol Rovers of League One on loan for the duration of the 2019-20 season.

==== Cambridge United (loan) ====
After his loan at Bristol Rovers was cut short, Adeboyejo dropped down a league to join League Two club Cambridge United on loan for the rest of the campaign.

=== Burton Albion ===
On 15 July 2022, Adeboyejo joined fellow League One club Burton Albion following Barnsley's relegation from the Championship. On 1 October 2022, Adeboyejo scored a first career hat trick, the third of the goals being a 92nd-minute winner, as Burton beat fellow strugglers Forest Green Rovers 3–2.

=== Bolton Wanderers ===
On 27 January 2023, Adeboyejo transferred to fellow League One club Bolton Wanderers with it reported the 25-year-old joined for an undisclosed fee which met the buy-out clause of his contract at the Pirelli Stadium, and has been reported as £500,000. He was cup-tied as Bolton went on to win the 2022–23 EFL Trophy. On 15 August, he scored a hat-trick in a 3–1 win against Fleetwood Town. He spent an entire year injured between February 2025 and 2026.

=== Mansfield Town ===
On 9 January 2026, Adeboyejo signed for Mansfield Town on a six-month deal. On 5 May 2026, the club announced he would be leaving in the summer when his contract expired.

=== Bromley ===
On July 13, 2026, Adeboyejo moved to EFL League One side Bromley.

== International career ==
Adeboyejo has expressed a desire to represent Nigeria if he reaches international standard.

== Career statistics ==
As of match played 6 April 2026

Appearances and goals by club, season and competition
| Club | Season | League | | | FA Cup | | EFL Cup | | Other | | Total | |
| Club | Season | Division | Apps | Goals | Apps | Goals | Apps | Goals | Apps | Goals | Apps | Goals |
|---|---|---|---|---|---|---|---|---|---|---|---|---|
| Leyton Orient | 2014–15 | League One | 1 | 0 | 0 | 0 | 0 | 0 | 0 | 0 | 1 | 0 |
| Leyton Orient | 2015–16 | League Two | 1 | 0 | 2 | 0 | 0 | 0 | 0 | 0 | 3 | 0 |
| Leyton Orient | 2016–17 | League Two | 13 | 1 | 0 | 0 | 0 | 0 | 1 (Note: Appearance(s) in EFL Trophy) | 0 | 14 | 1 |
| Leyton Orient | Total | | 15 | 1 | 2 | 0 | 0 | 0 | 1 | 0 | 18 | 1 |
| Royston Town (loan) | 2014–15 | Southern League Division One Central | 5 | 2 | 0 | 0 | — | | 0 | 0 | 5 | 2 |
| Heybridge Swifts (loan) | 2015–16 | Isthmian League Division One North | 1 | 0 | 0 | 0 | — | | 0 | 0 | 1 | 0 |
| Dulwich Hamlet (loan) | 2016–17 | Isthmian League Premier Division | 2 | 0 | 0 | 0 | — | | 0 | 0 | 2 | 0 |
| Soham Town Rangers (loan) | 2016–17 | Isthmian League Division One North | 6 | 1 | 1 | 1 | — | | 1 (Note: Appearance(s) in Alan Turvey Trophy) | 1 | 8 | 3 |
| Margate (loan) | 2016–17 | National League South | 3 | 0 | 0 | 0 | — | | 2 (Note: Appearance(s) in FA Trophy) | 1 | 5 | 1 |
| Barnsley | 2017–18 | Championship | 0 | 0 | 0 | 0 | 0 | 0 | — | | 0 | 0 |
| Barnsley | 2018–19 | League One | 25 | 2 | 1 | 0 | 1 | 0 | 4 | 2 | 31 | 4 |
| Barnsley | 2019–20 | Championship | 0 | 0 | 0 | 0 | 0 | 0 | 0 | 0 | 0 | 0 |
| Barnsley | 2020–21 | Championship | 30 | 2 | 3 | 0 | 1 | 0 | 0 | 0 | 34 | 2 |
| Barnsley | 2021–22 | Championship | 26 | 3 | 1 | 0 | 1 | 0 | 0 | 0 | 28 | 3 |
| Barnsley | Total | | 81 | 7 | 5 | 0 | 3 | 0 | 4 | 2 | 93 | 9 |
| Bristol Rovers (loan) | 2019–20 | League One | 18 | 1 | 5 | 0 | 2 | 0 | 5 | 1 | 30 | 2 |
| Cambridge United (loan) | 2019–20 | League Two | 8 | 0 | 0 | 0 | 0 | 0 | 0 | 0 | 8 | 0 |
| Burton Albion | 2022–23 | League One | 26 | 11 | 3 | 0 | 1 | 0 | 4 | 2 | 34 | 13 |
| Bolton Wanderers | 2022–23 | League One | 16 | 3 | 0 | 0 | 0 | 0 | 2 (Note: Appearance(s) in the League One play-offs) | 0 | 18 | 3 |
| Bolton Wanderers | 2023–24 | League One | 35 | 10 | 3 | 0 | 1 | 0 | 5 (Note: Four appearances in EFL Trophy, one appearance in League One play-offs) | 0 | 44 | 10 |
| Bolton Wanderers | 2024–25 | League One | 27 | 3 | 1 | 0 | 2 | 0 | 5 | 1 | 35 | 4 |
| Bolton Wanderers | 2025–26 | League One | 0 | 0 | 0 | 0 | 0 | 0 | 0 | 0 | 0 | 0 |
| Bolton Wanderers | Total | | 78 | 16 | 4 | 0 | 3 | 0 | 12 | 1 | 94 | 17 |
| Mansfield Town | 2025–26 | League One | 14 | 1 | 3 | 0 | 0 | 0 | 0 | 0 | 17 | 1 |
| Career total | | | 257 | 39 | 23 | 1 | 9 | 0 | 29 | 8 | 318 | 48 |

== Honours ==
Barnsley

- EFL League One runner-up: 2018–19
