= Finlay Lockett =

English footballer

Personal information
- Birth name: Finlay Hurford-Lockett
- Date of birth: 10 April 2003 (age 23)
- Place of birth: Marple, England
- Positions: Winger; centre-forward

Team information
- Current team: Bolton Wanderers

Youth career
- Burnley
- Bolton Wanderers

Senior career*
| Years | Team | Apps | (Gls) |
| 2019–2024 | Bolton Wanderers | 3 | (0) |
| 2022–2023 | → Atherton Collieries (loan) | 5 | (0) |
| 2024 | → Southport (loan) | 2 | (0) |
- * Club domestic league appearances and goals as of 12:15, 23 April 2024 (UTC)

Finlay Lockett (born Finlay Hurford-Lockett, 10 April 2003) is an English professional footballer who last played for Bolton Wanderers.

== Career ==
At the age of 8, Lockett was signed as a youth player by Burnley after being scouted at Brazilian Soccer Schools, Tameside. On 10 August 2019, Lockett made his Bolton Wanderers debut as a second-half substitute in a 0–0 draw at home to Coventry City, in which Bolton fielded their youngest ever team, due to financial difficulties.

As of 2019, Lockett is the second youngest ever player to play a first team game for Bolton aged 16 years and 122 days, with only former England international Ray Parry having been younger at the age of his debut. He returned to the U-18 for the 20–21 season. He scored 19 goals and got 18 assists for the U-18 in the 2020–21 season, however on the final day of the season he injured his ACL which could see him miss the entire 2021–22 season. On 16 June he announced he had signed his first professional contract signing until June 2022. He returned from injury for the reserves on 29 March 2022 and on 2 May Bolton announced they had activated an option clause in his contract to extend it to an unspecified date. On 14 June, he signed a new contract.

On 26 August 2022, Lockett joined Northern Premier League Premier Division side Atherton Collieries on a short-term loan agreement alongside his fellow young Trotter Arran Pettifer. He made his debut a day later as a substitute in a 1–0 defeat against Matlock Town. On 26 September, their loans were extended for another month. On 14 October, he was recalled from his loan. On 25 May 2023, he signed a new one-year deal with the option for an extra year.

In March 2024, Lockett joined National League North club Southport on loan until the end of the season. On 22 May, the club confirmed that he would be leaving at the end of his contract on 30 June.

== Personal life ==
On 6 October 2020 it was revealed his name had been shortened from "Finlay Hurford-Lockett" to "Finlay Lockett".

== Career statistics ==
As of match played 13 April 2024

Appearances and goals by club, season and competition
| Club | Season | League | | | FA Cup | | League Cup | | Other | | Total | |
| Club | Season | Division | Apps | Goals | Apps | Goals | Apps | Goals | Apps | Goals | Apps | Goals |
|---|---|---|---|---|---|---|---|---|---|---|---|---|
| Bolton Wanderers | 2019–20 | League One | 2 | 0 | 0 | 0 | 1 | 0 | 0 | 0 | 3 | 0 |
| Bolton Wanderers | 2020–21 | League Two | 1 | 0 | 0 | 0 | 0 | 0 | 1 (Note: Appearance(s) in the EFL Trophy.) | 0 | 2 | 0 |
| Bolton Wanderers | 2021–22 | League One | 0 | 0 | 0 | 0 | 0 | 0 | 0 | 0 | 0 | 0 |
| Bolton Wanderers | 2022–23 | League One | 0 | 0 | 0 | 0 | 0 | 0 | 0 | 0 | 0 | 0 |
| Bolton Wanderers | 2023–24 | League One | 0 | 0 | 0 | 0 | 0 | 0 | 0 | 0 | 0 | 0 |
| Bolton Wanderers | Total | | 3 | 0 | 0 | 0 | 1 | 0 | 1 | 0 | 5 | 0 |
| Atherton Collieries (loan) | 2022–23 | Northern Premier League | 5 | 0 | 1 | 0 | 0 | 0 | 0 | 0 | 6 | 0 |
| Southport (loan) | 2023–24 | National League North | 2 | 0 | 0 | 0 | 0 | 0 | 0 | 0 | 2 | 0 |
| Career total | | | 10 | 0 | 1 | 0 | 1 | 0 | 1 | 0 | 13 | 0 |
