= Josh Sheehan =

Welsh footballer (born 1995)

Personal information
- Full name: Joshua Luke Sheehan
- Date of birth: 30 March 1995 (age 31)
- Place of birth: Pembrey, Wales
- Height: 5 ft 8 in (1.72 m)
- Position: Midfielder

Team information
- Current team: Bolton Wanderers
- Number: 8

Youth career
- 2005–2014: Swansea City

Senior career*
Years	Team	Apps	(Gls)
2014–2018	Swansea City	0	(0)
2015	→ Yeovil Town (loan)	13	(0)
2015–2016	→ Yeovil Town (loan)	13	(2)
2016–2017	→ Newport County (loan)	20	(5)
2018–2021	Newport County	122	(8)
2021–	Bolton Wanderers	162	(14)

International career^{‡}
2012–2014	Wales U19	9	(0)
2014–2016	Wales U21	12	(0)
2020–	Wales	24	(0)
- * Club domestic league appearances and goals as of 16:47, 1 February 2025 (UTC) ‡ National team caps and goals as of 22:10, 17 November 2026 (UTC)

Joshua Luke Sheehan (born 30 March 1995) is a Welsh professional footballer who plays as a midfielder for EFL Championship club Bolton Wanderers and the Wales national team.

== Club career ==
=== Swansea City ===
Sheehan joined Swansea City academy at the age of 10. On 2 November 2012, he signed a professional contract with the club until the summer of 2015. In April 2014, Sheehan signed a new contract at Swansea until the summer of 2016. Sheehan was included in Swansea's 2014–15 pre-season tour of the United States, and later made his professional debut for the club against Rotherham United in the League Cup.

On 17 February 2015, Sheehan signed for Yeovil Town on a month's emergency loan which was later extended until the end of the season. Sheehan made 13 appearances for the Glovers as they were relegated to League Two.

Upon returning to Swansea, Sheehan captained the Under-21 team to the 2014–15 Professional U21 Development League 2 title. Sheehan subsequently signed a new contract with Swansea.

Sheehan rejoined Yeovil on loan in September 2015, returning to Swansea in January 2016.

On 8 August 2016, Sheehan joined Newport County on loan until 21 January 2017. He made his debut for Newport on 24 September 2016 in a League Two match versus Cambridge United as a second-half substitute. He scored his first goal for Newport County on 29 October 2016 in a 3–1 League Two win against Accrington Stanley. On 24 January 2017, the loan was extended to the end of the 2016–17 season but he returned to Swansea on 9 March 2017 after being ruled out for the remainder of the season through injury.

=== Newport County ===
On 5 January 2018, Sheehan returned to Newport County on a permanent 18-month deal. He was part of the team that reached the League Two play-off final at Wembley Stadium on 25 May 2019. Newport lost to Tranmere Rovers 1–0 after a goal in the 119th minute. He signed a two-year contract extension with Newport in May 2019. In July 2020 Sheehan was selected as Newport County's Player of the Year for the 2019–20 season. Sheehan played for Newport in the League Two play-off final at Wembley Stadium on 31 May 2021 which Newport lost to Morecambe, 1–0 after a 107th-minute penalty. Sheehan was named in the League Two PFA Team of the year for the 2020–21 season. Sheehan declined a contract extension at Newport at the end of the 2020–21 season.

=== Bolton Wanderers ===
At the conclusion of his contract at Newport, Sheehan joined League One club Bolton Wanderers on a two-year deal on 7 June 2021. His competitive debut came on 7 August 2021, when he scored a 20-yard free kick in a 3–3 draw against Milton Keynes Dons. On 20 November 2021, Bolton confirmed that Sheehan had been ruled out for the remainder of the 2021–22 season with a knee ligament injury.

On 2 April 2023, he started in the 2023 EFL Trophy final which Bolton won 4–0 against Plymouth Argyle. Following defeat in the play-offs, he was offered a new contract at the end of the 2022–23 season which he signed on 5 June 2023, extending his stay for two years. In November 2024 Sheehan extended his contract to the end of the 2026-27 season. In February 2026, he signed a new contract until 2028.

== International career ==
In September 2014, Sheehan was called up to the Wales under-21 squad for matches against Finland under-21 and Lithuania under-21. Sheehan made his Wales under-21 debut in a 2–2 draw against Finland.

On 5 November 2020, Sheehan received his first call-up to the Wales senior squad for matches during November against the US, Finland and Republic of Ireland.

He won his first senior cap on 12 November 2020 as a half time substitute in the 0–0 friendly match against the USA.

On 5 June 2024, it was announced that Sheehan would captain the Wales senior squad for the first time in their friendly against Gibraltar. He captained Wales to a 0–0 draw on 6 June 2024.

== Career statistics ==
=== Club ===
As of match played 6 November 2026

Appearances and goals by club, season and competition
Club	Season	League			FA Cup		League Cup		Other		Total	
Club	Season	Division	Apps	Goals	Apps	Goals	Apps	Goals	Apps	Goals	Apps	Goals
Swansea City	2014–15	Premier League	0	0	0	0	1	0	—		1	0
Swansea City	2015–16	Premier League	0	0	0	0	0	0	—		0	0
Swansea City	2016–17	Premier League	0	0	0	0	0	0	—		0	0
Swansea City	2017–18	Premier League	0	0	0	0	0	0	—		0	0
Swansea City	Total		0	0	0	0	1	0	—		1	0
Yeovil Town (loan)	2014–15	League One	13	0	0	0	—		0	0	13	0
Yeovil Town (loan)	2015–16	League Two	13	2	2	0	0	0	1 (Note: Appearance in Football League Trophy)	0	16	2
Yeovil Town (loan)	Total		26	2	2	0	0	0	1	0	29	2
Newport County (loan)	2016–17	League Two	20	5	4	2	0	0	1 (Note: Appearance(s) in EFL Trophy)	0	25	7
Newport County	2017–18	League Two	13	2	0	0	0	0	0	0	13	2
Newport County	2018–19	League Two	33	1	4	0	2	0	7 (Note: Four appearances in EFL Trophy, three appearances in League Two play-offs)	0	46	1
Newport County	2019–20	League Two	33	2	4	0	2	0	3	0	42	2
Newport County	2020–21	League Two	43	3	3	0	4	0	3 (Note: Three appearances in League Two play-offs)	0	53	3
Newport County	Total		122	8	11	0	8	0	13	0	154	8
Bolton Wanderers	2021–22	League One	15	4	1	0	2	0	2	0	20	4
Bolton Wanderers	2022–23	League One	24	2	0	0	0	0	10 (Note: Eight appearances in EFL Trophy, two appearances in League One play-offs)	0	34	2
Bolton Wanderers	2023–24	League One	43	2	3	0	1	0	6 (Note: Three appearances in EFL Trophy, three appearances in League One play-offs)	2	53	4
Bolton Wanderers	2024–25	League One	34	3	1	1	2	0	1	0	38	4
Bolton Wanderers	2025–26	League One	38	3	2	0	0	0	6 (Note: Three appearances in EFL Trophy, three appearances in League One play-offs)	0	46	3
Bolton Wanderers	2026–27	Championship	15	2	0	0	1	0	—		16	2
Total			168	16	7	1	6	0	25	2	207	19
Career total			337	31	24	3	15	0	40	2	416	36

=== International ===
As of match played 17 November 2026

Appearances and goals by national team and year
National team	Year	Apps	Goals
Wales	2020	1	0
Wales	2021	2	0
Wales	2022	0	0
Wales	2023	2	0
Wales	2024	5	0
Wales	2025	6	0
Wales	2026	8	0
Total		24	0

== Honours ==
Bolton Wanderers

- EFL Trophy: 2022–23
- EFL League One play-offs: 2026

Individual

- Newport County Player of the Year: 2019–20
- PFA Team of the Year: 2020–21 League Two, 2023–24 League One
- EFL League One Team of the Season: 2023–24
- Bolton Wanderers Player of the Year: 2023–24
