= Eoin Toal =

Northern Irish footballer (born 1999)

Personal information
- Full name: Eoin Toal
- Date of birth: 15 February 1999 (age 27)
- Place of birth: Armagh, Northern Ireland
- Height: 6 ft 3 in (1.91 m)
- Position: Defender

Team information
- Current team: Bolton Wanderers
- Number: 18

Youth career
- –2015: Armagh City

Senior career*
Years	Team	Apps	(Gls)
2015–2017	Armagh City		
2017–2022	Derry City	140	(5)
2022–	Bolton Wanderers	126	(12)

International career^{‡}
- Northern Ireland U15
2015	Northern Ireland U17	3	(0)
2017	Northern Ireland U19	3	(1)
2019–2020	Northern Ireland U21	13	(0)
2023–	Northern Ireland	10	(0)
- * Club domestic league appearances and goals as of 20:52, 23 October 2026 (UTC) ‡ National team caps and goals as of 22:03, 7 September 2025 (UTC)

Eoin Toal (born 15 February 1999) is a Northern Irish professional footballer who plays as a defender for EFL Championship club Bolton Wanderers and the Northern Ireland national team.

== Early and personal life ==
Toal was born in Armagh. One of his uncles, Peter Rafferty, and one of his cousins, Ethan Rafferty, played for Armagh in Gaelic football. Peter later managed Armagh U21 to All-Ireland glory in 2004. Eoin himself played Gaelic football until the age of 14, deciding instead to switch to association football. Another uncle, Mickey Toal, and another cousin, Thomas Mackle, both played Irish road bowling, with Mickey considered a legend in the sport, whilst Thomas has won the All-Ireland Championship.

== Club career ==
Toal began his career with Armagh City, captaining the youth team and making his first-team debut in 2015 aged 16, making over 50 appearances for the club in all competitions, before moving to Derry City in 2017. He served as club captain for Derry City, making 155 appearances for the club in all competitions. He started and played in the 2019 League of Ireland Cup final, and even converted one of the penalties in the penalty shootout, but it wasn't enough as they lost to Dundalk.

Toal signed for Bolton Wanderers in July 2022 on a three-year contract. It was reported in 2024 that Bolton paid £50,000 for the defender.

Toal picked up an ankle injury towards the end of his time at Derry, choosing to play through the injury as he did not want to miss their matches in the UEFA Europa Conference League against Riga. In doing so, he worsened the injury which caused him to miss Bolton's pre-season, as well as the start of their season. Upon his return from injury, he played for Bolton's B team to build up match fitness. He then stepped up his recovery by playing matches in the EFL Trophy. After more matches for the B team, as well as the EFL Trophy, Toal made his Football League debut on 2 December 2022 in a 1–1 draw against Bristol Rovers, with Toal being praised for his performance. Three weeks later he scored his first Bolton goal, scoring the equaliser in a 1–1 draw with Lincoln City. He received praise from his teammates for how well he had played during the start of his Bolton career and was named Bolton Player of the Month for December 2022. On 2 April, he started in the 2023 EFL Trophy final which Bolton won 4–0 against Plymouth Argyle. He was forced off towards the end of the match after a challenge by Sam Cosgrove, with Bolton manager Ian Evatt accusing Cosgrove of injuring him on purpose. A few days later, it was revealed the injury would possibly keep Toal out for the rest of the season. Toal recovered much earlier than expected though, allowing him to return for Bolton's last few games of the season. On 4 March 2024, he signed a new three-year contract with Bolton. On 2 August 2025, he was named the new Bolton captain. A week later, he scored his first goal as captain in a 2–0 win against Plymouth Argyle — the same team that injured him in the EFL Trophy final in 2023, gaining a small measure of revenge. Bolton won the 2026 EFL League One play-offs and gained promotion to the EFL Championship. Toal played in both legs of the semi-final, but missed the final due to an injury picked up in the semi final. He still lifted the trophy as captain.

== International career ==
Toal first played international football with the Northern Ireland under-15 team. He later played three times for the under-17 team in 2015, three times for the under-19 team in 2017, and 13 times for the under-21 team between 2019 and 2020. He scored one goal during this time, on 7 October 2017 in a 7–1 defeat against Germany under-19. He captained the under-21 team on multiple occasions.

On 7 March 2023, he received his first call-up to the Northern Irish senior national team by manager Michael O'Neill, for the UEFA Euro 2024 qualifying matches against San Marino and Finland. His debut came seven months later on 17 October when he started in a 1–0 qualifier defeat against Slovenia.

== Career statistics ==
=== Club ===
As of match played 23 October 2026

Appearances and goals by club, season and competition
Club	Season	League			National cup		League cup		Other		Total	
Club	Season	Division	Apps	Goals	Apps	Goals	Apps	Goals	Apps	Goals	Apps	Goals
Derry City	2017	League of Ireland Premier Division	3	0	0	0	0	0	—		3	0
Derry City	2018	League of Ireland Premier Division	30	1	0	0	2	0	—		32	1
Derry City	2019	League of Ireland Premier Division	35	2	2	0	4	0	—		41	2
Derry City	2020	League of Ireland Premier Division	18	0	2	0	—		1 (Note: Appearance in UEFA Europa League)	1	21	1
Derry City	2021	League of Ireland Premier Division	34	1	2	0	—		—		36	1
Derry City	2022	League of Ireland Premier Division	20	1	0	0	—		2 (Note: Appearances in UEFA Europa Conference League)	0	22	1
Derry City	Total		140	5	6	0	6	0	3	1	155	6
Bolton Wanderers	2022–23	League One	22	3	0	0	0	0	9 (Note: Seven appearances in EFL Trophy, two appearances in the League One play-offs)	0	31	3
Bolton Wanderers	2023–24	League One	40	4	3	0	1	0	7 (Note: Four appearances in EFL Trophy, three appearances and one goal in League One play-offs)	1	51	5
Bolton Wanderers	2024–25	League One	19	2	0	0	2	0	1 (Note: Appearance in the EFL Trophy)	0	22	2
Bolton Wanderers	2025–26	League One	37	3	2	0	0	0	3 (Note: One appearance in the EFL Trophy, two appearances in the play-offs)	0	42	3
Bolton Wanderers	2026–27	Championship	8	0	0	0	1	0	0	0	9	0
Bolton Wanderers	Total		126	12	5	0	4	0	20	1	155	13
Career total			266	17	11	0	10	0	23	2	310	19

=== International ===
As of match played 31 March 2026

Appearances and goals by national team and year
National team	Year	Apps	Goals
Northern Ireland	2023	3	0
Northern Ireland	2024	5	0
Northern Ireland	2025	2	0
Northern Ireland	2026	1	0
Total		11	0

== Honours ==
Derry City

- League of Ireland Cup runner-up: 2019

Bolton Wanderers

- EFL Trophy: 2022–23
- EFL League One play-offs: 2026
