= Randell Williams =

English footballer (born 1996)

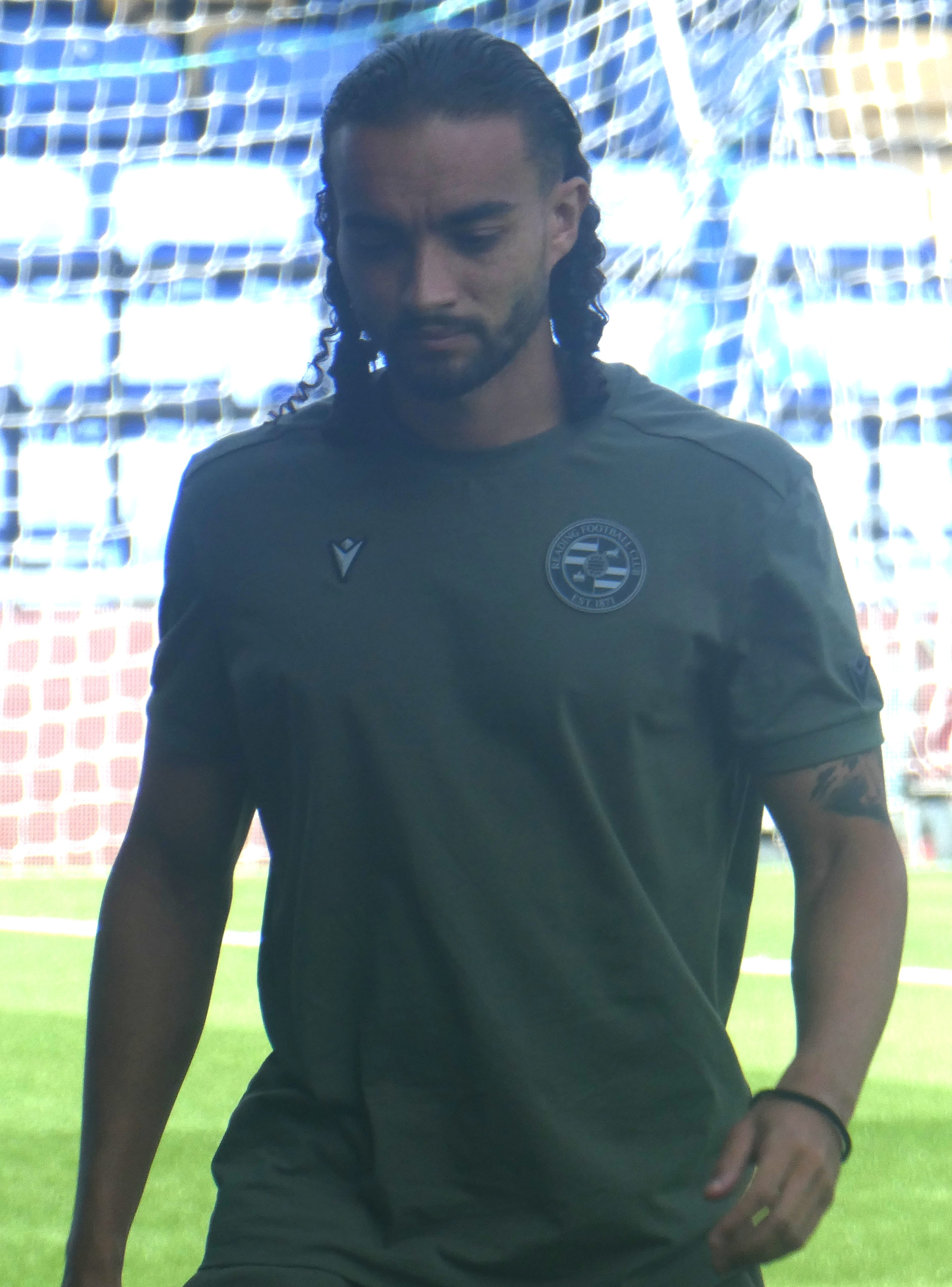
- Williams in 2026

Personal information
- Full name: Randell Alphonso Williams
- Date of birth: 30 December 1996 (age 29)
- Place of birth: Lambeth, England
- Height: 5 ft 8 in (1.73 m)
- Positions: Full back; winger

Team information
- Current team: Reading
- Number: 14

Youth career
- Tottenham Hotspur

Senior career*
Years	Team	Apps	(Gls)
2015–2016	Tower Hamlets	10	(1)
2016–2017	Crystal Palace	0	(0)
2017–2019	Watford	0	(0)
2018	→ Wycombe Wanderers (loan)	6	(1)
2018–2019	→ Wycombe Wanderers (loan)	20	(2)
2019–2021	Exeter City	76	(9)
2021–2023	Hull City	20	(0)
2023–2025	Bolton Wanderers	63	(5)
2025	Leyton Orient	14	(2)
2025–	Reading	31	(2)
- * Club domestic league appearances and goals as of 11:20, 22 November 2026 (UTC)

Randell Alphonso Williams (born 30 December 1996) is an English professional footballer who plays as a full-back and winger for EFL League One club Reading.

== Career ==
=== Early career ===
After spending time with the Tottenham Hotspur academy and playing non-league football for Tower Hamlets, Williams signed for Crystal Palace in January 2016. He had been on trial with the club in December 2015. Williams was released by Palace at the end of the 2016–17 season; in July 2017 he signed for Watford. He moved on loan to Wycombe Wanderers in January 2018. He made his professional debut on 2 April 2018, in a league game against Grimsby Town, and was praised by Wycombe manager Gareth Ainsworth for his performance. He returned to Wycombe Wanderers in July 2018 for a second loan spell, which ended on 1 January 2019.

=== Exeter City ===
He moved to Exeter City on a free transfer on 18 January 2019. He scored his first goal for Exeter City in the 4–0 derby victory against local rivals Plymouth Argyle. Williams ended the 2019–20 season with 5 goals and 14 assists, and was awarded Player of the Season and Goal of the Season by the club.

He was offered a new contract by Exeter City on 12 May 2021, with the club saying they expected him to leave.

=== Hull City ===
On 17 June 2021 it was announced that he would sign for Hull City on a free transfer on 1 July 2021. He made his debut for Hull City on 14 August 2021 when he came on as a 73rd minute substitute for Richie Smallwood in the 3–0 loss to Queens Park Rangers.

=== Bolton Wanderers ===
On 5 January 2023, Williams joined Bolton Wanderers for an undisclosed fee, signing a two-and-a-half-year deal with the club. On 14 February, he scored his first goal for the club in a 5–0 home win against MK Dons. On 2 April, he was an unused substitute in the 2023 EFL Trophy final. Bolton went on to win 4–0 against Plymouth Argyle at Wembley Stadium to win the trophy.

=== Leyton Orient ===
In February 2025, Williams signed for Leyton Orient. He was released by the club at the end of the 2024–25 season, following the expiry of his contract.

=== Reading ===
On 5 November 2025, Williams signed a short-term contract with Reading until January 2026. On 7 January 2026, Reading announced that they had extended their contract with Williams until the summer of 2027.

== Career statistics ==
As of match played 21 November 2026

Appearances and goals by club, season and competition
Club	Season	League			FA Cup		League Cup		Other		Total	
Club	Season	Division	Apps	Goals	Apps	Goals	Apps	Goals	Apps	Goals	Apps	Goals
Crystal Palace	2016–17	Premier League	0	0	0	0	0	0	0	0	0	0
Watford	2017–18	Premier League	0	0	0	0	0	0	0	0	0	0
Watford	2018–19	Premier League	0	0	0	0	0	0	0	0	0	0
Watford	Total		0	0	0	0	0	0	0	0	0	0
Wycombe Wanderers (loan)	2017–18	League Two	6	1	0	0	0	0	0	0	6	1
Wycombe Wanderers (loan)	2018–19	League One	20	2	1	0	1	1	1 (Note: Appearances in the EFL Trophy.)	0	23	3
Exeter City	2018–19	League Two	10	0	0	0	0	0	0	0	10	0
Exeter City	2019–20	League Two	37	5	4	0	0	0	5 (Note: Two appearances in the EFL Trophy and three appearances in the League Two play-offs.)	0	46	5
Exeter City	2020–21	League Two	29	4	1	0	0	1	0	0	31	4
Exeter City	Total		76	9	5	0	1	0	5	0	87	9
Hull City	2021–22	Championship	13	0	1	0	0	0	0	0	14	0
Hull City	2022–23	Championship	7	0	0	0	1	0	0	0	8	0
Hull City	Total		20	0	1	0	1	0	0	0	22	0
Bolton Wanderers	2022–23	League One	15	1	—		—		4 (Note: Two appearances in the EFL Trophy, two appearances in the League One play-offs)	0	19	1
Bolton Wanderers	2023–24	League One	32	3	3	0	0	0	5 (Note: Three appearances in EFL Trophy, two appearances and one goal in League One play-offs)	1	40	4
Bolton Wanderers	2024–25	League One	16	1	1	0	2	0	3	0	22	1
Bolton Wanderers	Total		63	5	4	0	2	0	12	1	81	6
Leyton Orient	2024–25	League One	14	2	0	0	0	0	3 (Note: Appearances in the play-offs)	0	17	2
Reading	2025–26	League One	15	2	0	0	0	0	0	0	15	2
Reading	2026–27	League One	16	0	1	0	3	1	2	0	22	1
Reading	Total		31	2	1	0	3	1	2	0	37	3
Career total			230	21	12	0	8	2	23	1	273	24

== Honours ==
Bolton Wanderers

- EFL Trophy: 2022–23

Individual

- PFA Team of the Year: 2019–20 League Two
- Exeter City Player of the Season: 2019–20
