= Josh Dacres-Cogley =

English footballer (born 1996)

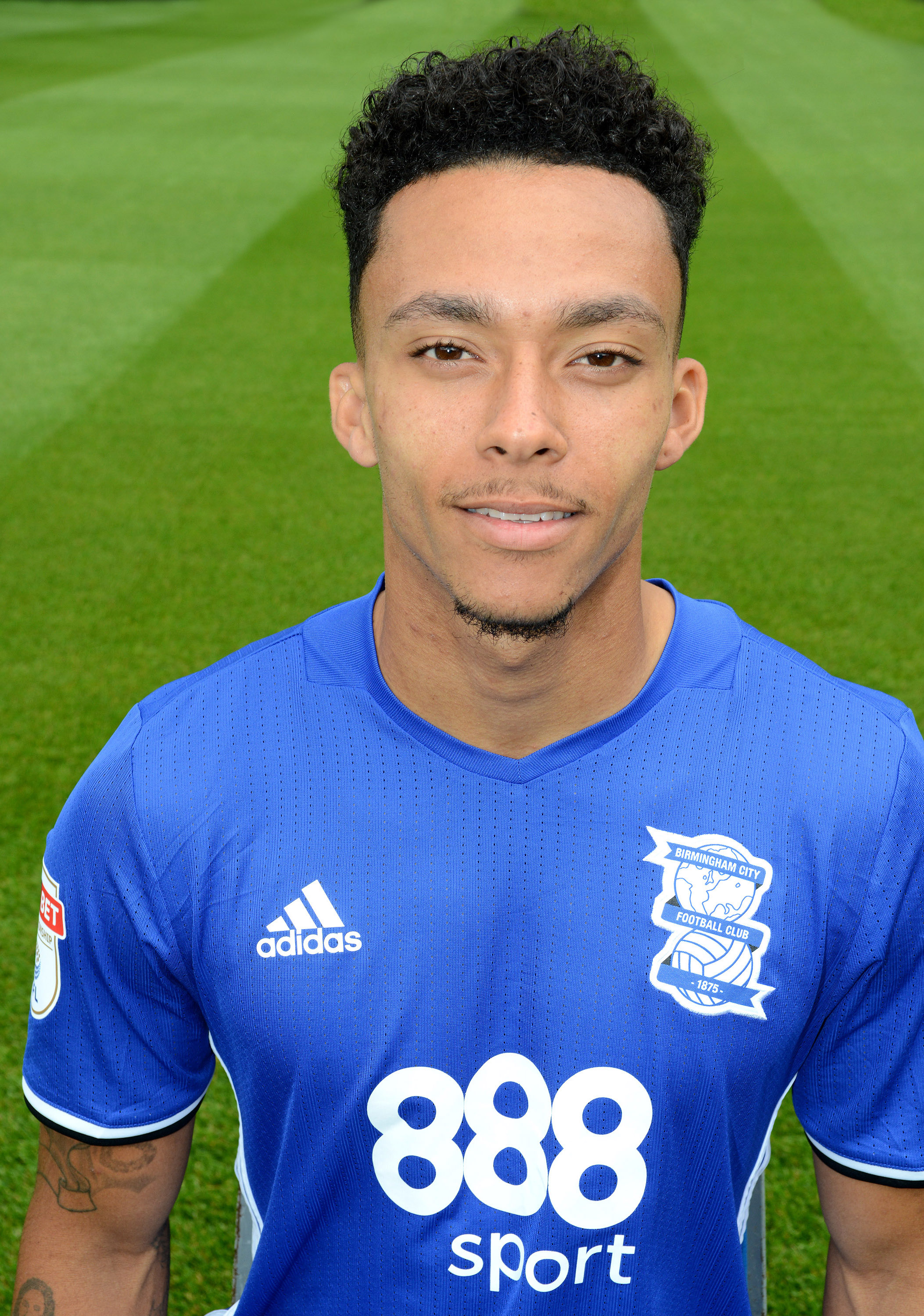
- Dacres-Cogley with Birmingham City in 2016

Personal information
- Full name: Joshua Jacob Dacres-Cogley
- Date of birth: 12 March 1996 (age 30)
- Place of birth: Coventry, England
- Height: 5 ft 9 in (1.74 m)
- Positions: Right-back; right wing-back

Team information
- Current team: Stockport County
- Number: 2

Youth career
- 2011–2015: Birmingham City

Senior career*
Years	Team	Apps	(Gls)
2015–2021	Birmingham City	23	(0)
2019–2020	→ Crawley Town (loan)	16	(0)
2021–2023	Tranmere Rovers	91	(2)
2023–2026	Bolton Wanderers	99	(4)
2026–	Stockport County	22	(0)
- * Club domestic league appearances and goals as of 00:22, 25 October 2026 (UTC)

Joshua Jacob Dacres-Cogley (born 12 March 1996), sometimes referred to as Josh Cogley, is an English professional footballer who plays as a right-back or right wing-back for EFL League One club Stockport County.

Cogley spent ten years with Birmingham City, making 30 first-team appearances, including 23 in the Championship, and had a loan spell with Crawley Town of League Two in the 2019–20 season. Released in 2021, he spent two seasons as a regular with League Two club Tranmere Rovers before moving up a division to join Bolton Wanderers.

== Life and career ==
=== Early life and youth football ===
Dacres-Cogley was born in Coventry and attended Myton School, Warwick. He joined Birmingham City F.C.'s academy in 2011, and took up a scholarship in July 2012. Interviewed in January 2014, the player assessed his strengths as speed, stamina, getting forward and defending, but felt he needed to improve his passing. When some of his peers signed their first professional contracts, Dacres-Cogley accepted a third-year scholarship. He played in the Birmingham team – a mixture of first-team and reserve players – that won the 2014–15 Birmingham Senior Cup, and signed his first professional contract, of one year, a few days later. According to coach Steve Spooner, Dacres-Cogley had an unsuccessful trial with Birmingham as a winger, but when he returned as a full back, "he did very well so we signed him as a scholar. He has really progressed well and worked on his overall game and his variety of passing. That part of game has really come to fruition. He is a wonderful athlete, he's quick and has the ability to get forward and back quickly, which is a prerequisite for a modern day full-back.

He performed well in pre-season matches, and manager Gary Rowett had hoped to loan him out to a Football League team, but an injury prevented any such move. At the end of the 2015–16 season, Dacres-Cogley was an unused substitute for the Birmingham reserve team that lost the 2016 Birmingham Senior Cup final to National League North champions Solihull Moors, and the club took up their option for another year on his contract. Ahead of the 2015–16 season, he was one of three youngsters – the others were Dom Bernard and Wes Harding – who began their pre-season training with the first team, and he impressed enough to be included in first-team friendlies. Against Port Vale, he provided the crosses that led to both Birmingham's goals, and a couple of days later was given a squad number.

=== First-team football with Birmingham City ===
Dacres-Cogley made his senior debut on 9 August 2016 in the EFL Cup first-round match at home to Oxford United. He played the whole 120 minutes of the match, which Birmingham lost 1–0 after extra time. With Jonathan Spector suspended and Paul Caddis injured, he made his first Football League appearance on 26 November, starting the visit to Brentford at right back. Birmingham won 2–1, and Rowett praised Dacres-Cogley's performance, saying "he played with a lot of composure at times, showed good energy, got through the game in terms of his athleticism and fitness. And when he had to defend and win some headers he certainly did that." Rowett left the club soon afterwards, and his successor, Gianfranco Zola, continued with Dacres-Cogley in the starting eleven for a time, but the team struggled. An experiment with Dacres-Cogley on the right of a back three was not successful, and he made only two brief substitute appearances in the last two months of the campaign. In February 2017, he signed a three-and-a-half-year contract with Birmingham.

The arrival of several defensive players during the 2017 summer transfer window pushed Dacres-Cogley down the pecking order, and his first appearance of the new season did not come until December, starting in central defence in a 1–0 loss to Fulham. In what remained of the 2017–18 season and the whole of the next, he made four appearances in cup competitions and played just 12 minutes of Championship football.

==== Crawley Town (loan) ====
After playing in Birmingham's EFL Cup defeat at Portsmouth on 6 August, Dacres-Cogley signed a one-year contract extension and joined League Two club Crawley Town on loan to the end of the 2019–20 season. During his third appearance, he fractured an ankle. He returned to first-team action on 1 January 2020, playing the first 71 minutes of a 1–1 draw away to Colchester United. He returned to action in January 2020, and had made 16 appearances by the time the League Two season was first suspended and then ended early because of the COVID-19 pandemic.

=== Return to Birmingham ===
Dacres-Cogley made his first league appearance for Birmingham for nearly two years when he started at right back and was involved in the build-up to the opening goal in the 2–1 win away to Preston North End on 31 October 2020. He was a regular in the matchday squad and made two more starts in the first half of the season, but then dropped out of contention. After Birmingham avoided relegation, new manager Lee Bowyer used the two remaining matches as an opportunity to look at his fringe players, and Dacres-Cogley started in both. In May 2021, Birmingham confirmed that Dacres-Cogley would leave the club when his contract expired at the end of the season.

=== Tranmere Rovers ===
Dacres-Cogley signed a two-year contract with League Two club Tranmere Rovers in June 2021. He made his debut on the opening day of the season, playing the whole of the 1–0 win at home to Walsall.

=== Bolton Wanderers ===
On 21 June 2023, Bolton Wanderers announced that Dacres-Cogley would join them on a two-year deal on 1 July at the end of his Tranmere contract. He scored Bolton's second goal in a 2–1 win over Derby County on 2 September, but the goal was not initially credited to him by some sources. It was eventually awarded to him by the dubious goals panel later in the month.

=== Stockport County ===
On 15 January 2026, Dacres-Cogley signed for Stockport County on an eighteen month deal for an undisclosed fee.

== Career statistics ==
As of match played 24 October 2026

Appearances and goals by club, season and competition
Club	Season	League			FA Cup		EFL Cup		Other		Total	
Club	Season	Division	Apps	Goals	Apps	Goals	Apps	Goals	Apps	Goals	Apps	Goals
Birmingham City	2016–17	Championship	14	0	2	0	1	0	—		17	0
Birmingham City	2017–18	Championship	3	0	2	0	0	0	—		5	0
Birmingham City	2018–19	Championship	1	0	0	0	1	0	—		2	0
Birmingham City	2019–20	Championship	0	0	0	0	1	0	—		1	0
Birmingham City	2020–21	Championship	5	0	0	0	0	0	—		5	0
Birmingham City	Total		23	0	4	0	3	0	—		30	0
Crawley Town (loan)	2019–20	League Two	16	0	0	0	—		0	0	16	0
Tranmere Rovers	2021–22	League Two	45	1	2	0	1	0	0	0	48	1
Tranmere Rovers	2022–23	League Two	46	1	1	0	2	0	3 (Note: Appearance(s) in EFL Trophy)	0	52	1
Tranmere Rovers	Total		91	2	3	0	3	0	3	0	100	2
Bolton Wanderers	2023–24	League One	44	3	2	0	2	0	7 (Note: Four appearances in EFL Trophy, three in League One play-offs)	0	55	3
Bolton Wanderers	2024–25	League One	42	1	1	0	3	0	6	0	52	1
Bolton Wanderers	2025–26	League One	13	0	1	0	1	0	3	0	18	0
Bolton Wanderers	Total		99	4	4	0	6	0	16	0	125	4
Stockport County	2025–26	League One	15	0	0	0	—		3 (Note: Three appearances in League One play-offs)	0	18	0
Stockport County	2026–27	League One	7	0	0	0	0	0	2	0	9	0
Stockport County	Total		22	0	0	0	0	0	5	0	27	0
Career total			251	6	11	0	12	0	24	0	298	6

== Honours ==
Individual

- EFL League One Team of the Season: 2023–24
