= Sam Barrott =

English football referee

- Full name: Samuel Barrott
- Born: 1992 or 1993 (age 33–34); Yorkshire

Domestic
Years	League	Role
2020–	English Football League	Referee
2024–	Premier League	Referee

International
Years	League	Role
2025–	FIFA listed	Referee

Samuel Barrott (born 1992 or 1993) is an English professional football referee who has primarily officiated in the Premier League since 2024. He was promoted to the FIFA list of international referees in December 2024.

== Refereeing career ==
Barrot started refereeing at the age of 15 after an injury playing for the Halifax Town youth team. He is based in West Riding.

Barrott was promoted from the National list of officials to the EFL at the end of the 2019–2020 season.

He was promoted Select Group 2 at the start of the 2023–2024 season. He refereed 15 Premier League matches during the season, with his debut coming on 7 October 2023 at Craven Cottage between Fulham and Sheffield United.

Barrott refereed the 2024 EFL League One play-off final between Bolton Wanderers and Oxford United.

He was promoted to the Select Group at the start of the 2024–2025 season.

Barrott was promoted to the FIFA list of international referees in December 2024, replacing Craig Pawson.

== See also ==
- List of football referees
