= 2024 EFL play-offs =

English Football League play-offs
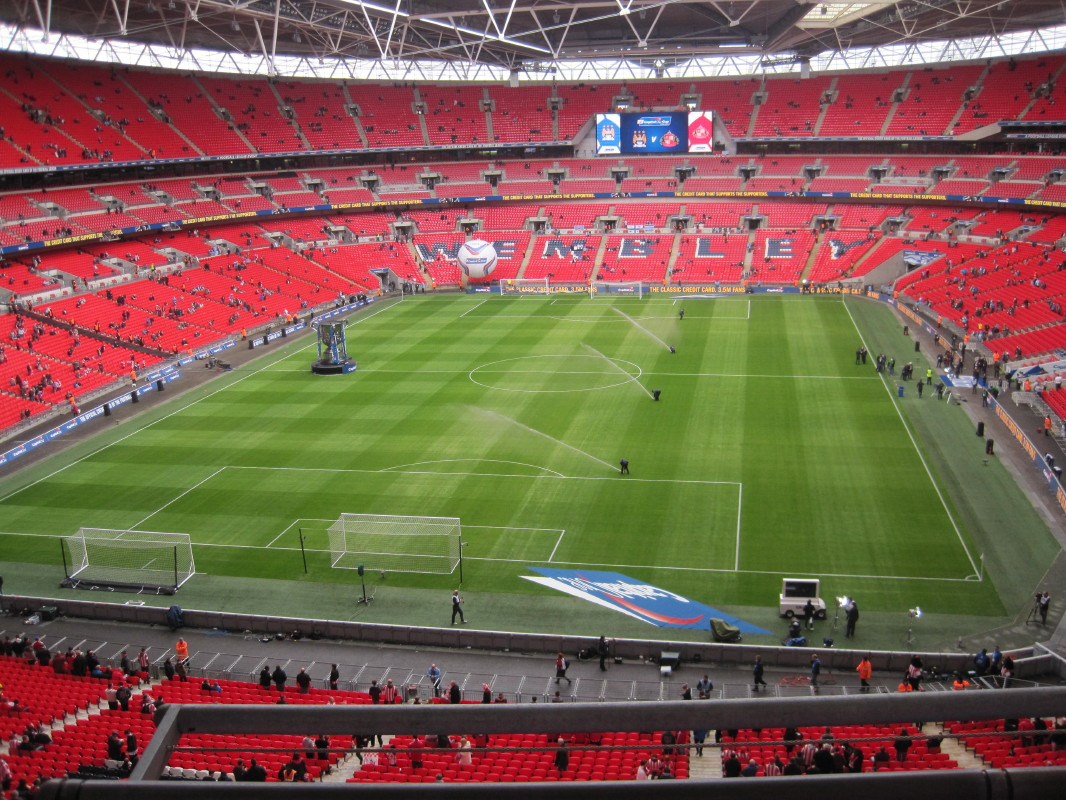
- Wembley Stadium was the venue for each play-off final
- Season: 2023–24

The English Football League play-offs for the 2023–24 season (referred to as the Sky Bet Play-Offs for sponsorship reasons) were held in May 2024 with all finals being staged at Wembley Stadium in London.

The play-offs began in each league with two semi-finals which were played over two legs. The teams who finished in 3rd to 6th place in the Championship and League One and the 4th to 7th-placed teams in League Two competed. The winners of the semi-finals advanced to the finals, with the winners gaining promotion for the following season.

== Background ==
The English Football League play-offs have been held every year since 1987. They take place for each division following the conclusion of the regular season and are contested by the four clubs finishing below the automatic promotion places. The fixtures are determined by final league position – in the Championship and League One this is 3rd v 6th and 4th v 5th, while in League Two it is 4th v 7th and 5th v 6th.

== Championship ==
=== Championship semi-finals ===
The final table was confirmed after the final matchday on 4 May 2024. Going into the final day, Southampton had already confirmed their place in their play-offs by finishing 4th. Leeds United could only secure automatic promotion if they beat Southampton and Ipswich Town lost to Huddersfield Town. In the end, Leeds United missed out on automatic promotion after losing to Southampton, confirming they would finish 3rd. Ipswich Town won their match against Huddersfield. Norwich City, West Bromwich Albion, and Hull City were all in the hunt for the last two spots. West Bromwich Albion leapfrogged Norwich City to 5th after beating Preston North End. Despite their loss to relegation-threatened Birmingham City, Norwich City managed to finish 6th after Hull City also lost against Birmingham City's relegation rivals Plymouth Argyle.

Final league position - Championship
Pos	Team	Pld	W	D	L	GF	GA	GD	Pts
3	Leeds United	46	27	9	10	81	43	+38	90
4	Southampton	46	26	9	11	87	63	+24	87
5	West Bromwich Albion	46	21	12	13	70	47	+23	75
6	Norwich City	46	21	10	15	79	64	+14	73

First leg

12 May 2024
12:00 BST

Norwich City	0–0	Leeds United
	Report

Carrow Road, Norwich
Attendance: 26,982
Referee: Josh Smith
12 May 2024
14:15 BST

West Bromwich Albion	0–0	Southampton
	Report

The Hawthorns, West Bromwich
Attendance: 25,367
Referee: Sam Barrott

Second leg

16 May 2024
20:00 BST

Leeds United	4–0	Norwich City
Gruev 7'; Piroe 20'; Rutter 40'; Summerville 68'	Report

Elland Road, Leeds
Attendance: 36,384
Referee: Jarred Gillett

Leeds United won 4–0 on aggregate.

17 May 2024
20:00 BST

Southampton	3–1	West Bromwich Albion
Smallbone 49'; A. Armstrong 78', 86' (pen.)	Report	Kipré 90+7'

St Mary's Stadium, Southampton
Attendance: 30,712
Referee: Tim Robinson

Southampton won 3–1 on aggregate.

=== Championship final ===
26 May 2024
15:00 BST

Leeds United	0–1	Southampton
	Report	A. Armstrong 24'

Wembley Stadium, London
Attendance: 85,862
Referee: John Brooks

== League One ==
=== League One semi-finals ===
The final table was confirmed after the final matchday on 27 April 2024. Going into the final day, Bolton Wanderers had already qualified for the play-offs but still had a chance of automatic promotion. However, a Derby County win prevented that possibility. In the end, they drew with Peterborough United, who had also already guaranteed their place in the play-offs to finish 3rd and 4th respectively. The final day also saw a four-way battle between Barnsley, Oxford United, Lincoln City and Blackpool for the final two spots. In the end, Oxford United secured 5th with a win over Exeter City while Barnsley's draw with Northampton Town proved enough to finish 6th as Lincoln City and Blackpool lost to Champions Portsmouth and Reading respectively to miss out.

Final league position - League One
Pos	Team	Pld	W	D	L	GF	GA	GD	Pts
3	Bolton Wanderers	46	25	12	9	86	51	+35	87
4	Peterborough United	46	25	9	12	89	61	+28	84
5	Oxford United	46	22	11	13	79	56	+23	77
6	Barnsley	46	21	13	12	82	64	+18	76

First leg

3 May 2024
19:45 BST

Barnsley	1–3	Bolton Wanderers
Cosgrove 75'	Report	Charles 23', 53' (pen.); Williams 90+4'

Oakwell, Barnsley
Attendance: 13,846
Referee: Will Finnie
4 May 2024
19:45 BST

Oxford United	1–0	Peterborough United
Moore 53'	Report

Kassam Stadium, Oxford
Attendance: 11,125
Referee: Lewis Smith

Second leg

7 May 2024
20:00 BST

Bolton Wanderers	2–3	Barnsley
Collins 43'; Toal 45+1'	Report	Cosgrove 36', 76'; Phillips 64'

Toughsheet Community Stadium, Horwich
Attendance: 24,518
Referee: Oliver Langford

Bolton Wanderers won 5–4 on aggregate.

8 May 2024
20:00 BST

Peterborough United	1–1	Oxford United
Knight 41'	Report	Brannagan 45+3' (pen.)

London Road Stadium, Peterborough
Attendance: 12,420
Referee: Andrew Kitchen

Oxford United won 2–1 on aggregate.

=== League One final ===
18 May 2024
16:15 BST

Bolton Wanderers	0–2	Oxford United
	Report	Murphy 31', 42'

Wembley Stadium, London
Attendance: 70,472
Referee: Sam Barrott

== League Two ==
=== League Two semi-finals ===
The final table was confirmed after the final matchday on 27 April 2024. Going into the final day, Milton Keynes Dons had already secured a play-off place and were confirmed to finish 4th. The remaining three places were under contention between Doncaster Rovers, Crewe Alexandra, Crawley Town, Barrow and Bradford City. Thanks to Doncaster Rovers' spectacular run from February onwards, where they only lost once coupled with a 10-match win streak, a draw against Gillingham was enough to see them finish 5th. A draw against Colchester United was also enough for Crewe Alexandra to secure 6th. Crawley Town's win over Grimsby Town saw them take 7th as Barrow's draw against Mansfield Town meant they would drop out off the play-offs. All these results meant that Bradford City's win over Newport County would not be enough to see them over the line.

Final league position - League Two
Pos	Team	Pld	W	D	L	GF	GA	GD	Pts
4	Milton Keynes Dons	46	23	9	14	83	68	+15	78
5	Doncaster Rovers	46	21	8	17	73	68	+5	71
6	Crewe Alexandra	46	19	14	13	69	65	+4	71
7	Crawley Town	46	21	7	18	73	67	+6	70

First leg

6 May 2024
17:30 BST

Crewe Alexandra	0–2	Doncaster Rovers
	Report	Molyneux 34'; Biggins 48'

Gresty Road, Crewe
Attendance: 8,220
Referee: Sunny Singh Gill
7 May 2024
19:30 BST

Crawley Town	3–0	Milton Keynes Dons
L. Kelly 5'; Williams 45+1'; Darcy 65'	Report

Broadfield Stadium, Crawley
Attendance: 5,564
Referee: Ross Joyce

Second leg

10 May 2024
20:00 BST

Doncaster Rovers	0–2 (a.e.t.)	Crewe Alexandra
	Report	Demetriou 6'; Maxwell 16' (o.g.)
Penalties
Ironside (penalty scored); Westbrooke (penalty missed); Miller (penalty scored); Bailey (penalty scored); Adelakun (penalty missed)	3–4	(penalty scored) Baker-Richardson; (penalty missed) Demetriou; (penalty scored) Cooney; (penalty scored) Leigh; (penalty scored) Kirk

Eco-Power Stadium, Doncaster
Attendance: 12,889
Referee: Scott Oldham

2–2 on aggregate, Crewe Alexandra won 4–3 on penalties.

11 May 2024
19:45 BST

Milton Keynes Dons	1–5	Crawley Town
Dean 45+1'	Report	Williams 3'; Orsi 30', 48', 90+2'; Roles 80'

Stadium MK, Milton Keynes
Attendance: 10,053
Referee: Seb Stockridge

Crawley Town won 8–1 on aggregate.

=== League Two final ===
19 May 2024
13:00 BST

Crawley Town	2–0	Crewe Alexandra
Orsi 41'; L. Kelly 85'	Report

Wembley Stadium, London
Attendance: 33,341
Referee: Ben Toner (Lancashire)
