= 2026 EFL League One play-off final =

Association football match

2026 EFL League One play-off Final
- Wembley Stadium in London hosted the final.
Stockport County	Bolton Wanderers
1	4
- Date: 24 May 2026
- Venue: Wembley Stadium, London
- Attendance: 48,268

The 2026 EFL League One play-off final was an association football match played on 24 May 2026 at Wembley Stadium, London, to determine the third and final team to gain promotion from EFL League One, the third tier of English football, to the EFL Championship. The top two teams of the 2025–26 EFL League One, champions Lincoln City and 2nd-placed Cardiff City, gained automatic promotion to the Championship.

== Route to the final ==
EFL League One final table, leading positions
Pos	Team	Pld	W	D	L	GF	GA	GD	Pts	Qualification
1	Lincoln City (C, P)	46	31	10	5	89	41	+48	103	Promotion to 2026–27 EFL Championship
2	Cardiff City (P)	46	27	10	9	90	50	+40	91	Promotion to 2026–27 EFL Championship
3	Stockport County	46	22	11	13	71	58	+13	77	Qualified
4	Bradford City	46	22	11	13	58	51	+7	77	Eliminated
5	Bolton Wanderers (O, P)	46	19	18	9	70	52	+18	75	Qualified
6	Stevenage	46	21	12	13	49	46	+3	75	Eliminated

Source: EFL Official Website
(C) Champions; (O) Play-off winners; (P) Promoted

== Match ==
=== Details ===
24 May 2026
13:00 BST

Stockport County	1–4	Bolton Wanderers
Sidibeh 29'	Report	Rodrigues 3', 90+4' (pen.); Wootton 64' (o.g.); Dalby 81'

Wembley Stadium, London
Attendance: 48,268
Referee: Josh Smith

Stockport County	Bolton Wanderers

GK	34	(Jamaica) Corey Addai
RB	2	(England) Josh Dacres-Cogley	(red card) 90+2'
CB	19	(England) Kyle Wootton	(yellow card) 60'
CB	15	(England) Ethan Pye
LB	14	(England) Tayo Edun		(substituted off) 90+5'
CM	27	(England) Odin Bailey	(yellow card) 80'
CM	26	(Northern Ireland) Oliver Norwood (c)
CM	23	(England) Ben Osborn		(substituted off) 81'
RW	28	(Northern Ireland) Josh Stokes		(substituted off) 65'
CF	29	(The Gambia) Adama Sidibeh		(substituted off) 65'
LW	20	(England) Louie Barry		(substituted off) 65'
Substitutes:
GK	1	(England) Ben Hinchliffe
DF	16	(England) Callum Connolly		(substituted on) 90+5'
MF	18	(Scotland) Lewis Fiorini
FW	7	(England) Jack Diamond		(substituted on) 65'
FW	9	(England) Tanto Olaofe		(substituted on) 65'
FW	11	(Jamaica) Malik Mothersille		(substituted on) 81'
FW	22	(Iceland) Benoný Breki Andrésson		(substituted on) 65'
Manager:
(England) Dave Challinor

GK	1	(Republic of Ireland) Jack Bonham
RB	14	(England) Jordi Osei-Tutu
CB	3	(Saint Lucia) Chris Forino-Joseph
CB	6	(Scotland) George Johnston (c)
LB	25	(England) Max Conway	(substituted off) 76'
CM	8	(Wales) Josh Sheehan
CM	4	(England) Xavier Simons	(substituted off) 62'
RW	19	(England) Amario Cozier-Duberry
AM	27	(Portugal) Rúben Rodrigues
LW	11	(Barbados) Thierry Gale	(substituted off) 72'
CF	48	(England) Mason Burstow	(substituted off) 72'
Substitutes:
GK	23	(Republic of Ireland) David Harrington
DF	29	(Republic of Ireland) Cyrus Christie	(substituted on) 76'
MF	21	(Scotland) Ethan Erhahon
MF	22	(England) Kyle Dempsey
FW	10	(England) Sam Dalby	(substituted on) 62'
FW	20	(Guinea) Ibrahim Cissoko	(substituted on) 72'
FW	45	(England) John McAtee	(substituted on) 72'
Head Coach:
(England) Steven Schumacher

Statistics
	Stockport County	Bolton Wanderers
Possession	42%	58%
Goals scored	1	4
Shots on target	4	9
Shots off target	1	3
Fouls committed	11	8
Corner kicks	2	5
Yellow cards	2	0
Red cards	1	0
