= 2025–26 Bolton Wanderers F.C. season =

137th season in existence of Bolton Wanderers FC

Bolton Wanderers F.C.
2025–26 season
- Owner: Football Ventures Ltd (92%), British Business Bank (8%)
- Chairman: Sharon Brittan
- Manager: Steven Schumacher
- Stadium: Toughsheet Community Stadium
- League One: 5th (promoted via play-offs)
- Play-offs: Winners
- FA Cup: Second round
- EFL Cup: First round
- EFL Trophy: Round of 16
- Top goalscorer: League: Mason Burstow (12); All: Sam Dalby (14)
- Highest home attendance: 26,473 v Bradford City (22 Nov 2025, League One)
- Lowest home attendance: 1,955 v Port Vale (13 Jan 2026, EFL Trophy)
- Average home league attendance: 21,692
- Biggest win: 4–0 v Port Vale (Home, 8 Nov 2025, League One); 2–6 v Oldham Athletic (Away, 11 Nov 2025, EFL Trophy); 1–5 v Exeter City (Away, 13 Dec 2025, League One); 5–1 v Stevenage (Home, 14 Apr 2026, League One)
- Biggest defeat: 4–0 v Swindon Town (Away, 6 Dec 2025, FA Cup)

The 2025–26 season is the 137th season in the history of Bolton Wanderers Football Club and their fifth consecutive season in League One. In addition to the domestic league, the club also participated in the FA Cup, the EFL Cup, and the EFL Trophy.

Like previous seasons, Bolton's home kit was decided by a fan vote. The choices were between Abstract, Map, Graphic, and Herringbone with Abstract winning. The away kit is a modernised version of the away kit from the 2005–06 season, to celebrate the 20th anniversary of Bolton's first ever season in the UEFA Cup.

== Squad ==
=== First team ===
As of 13 March 2026

Note: Flags indicate national team as defined under FIFA eligibility rules; some limited exceptions apply. Players may hold more than one non-FIFA nationality.

No.	Pos.	Nation	Player
1	GK	IRL	Jack Bonham
3	DF	LCA	Chris Forino-Joseph (vice-captain)
4	MF	ENG	Xavier Simons
5	DF	ENG	Richard Taylor
6	DF	SCO	George Johnston (vice-captain)
8	MF	WAL	Josh Sheehan
9	FW	IRL	Johnny Kenny (on loan from Celtic)
10	FW	ENG	Sam Dalby
11	FW	BRB	Thierry Gale
13	GK	ENG	Nathan Broome
14	DF	ENG	Jordi Osei-Tutu
15	FW	SCO	Rob Apter (on loan from Charlton Athletic)
18	DF	NIR	Eoin Toal (captain)
19	FW	ENG	Amario Cozier-Duberry (on loan from Brighton & Hove Albion)

No.	Pos.	Nation	Player
20	FW	GUI	Ibrahim Cissoko (on loan from Toulouse)
21	MF	SCO	Ethan Erhahon
22	MF	ENG	Kyle Dempsey
23	GK	IRL	David Harrington
24	FW	FIN	Marcus Forss (on loan from Middlesbrough)
25	DF	ENG	Max Conway
26	DF	IRL	Lewis Temple
27	MF	POR	Rúben Rodrigues
28	MF	EGY	Sonny Sharples-Ahmed
29	DF	IRL	Cyrus Christie
35	FW	ENG	Corey Blackett-Taylor (on loan from Derby County)
45	FW	ENG	John McAtee
48	FW	ENG	Mason Burstow (on loan from Hull City)

=== Bolton B squad ===
As of 30 January 2026

Note: Flags indicate national team as defined under FIFA eligibility rules; some limited exceptions apply. Players may hold more than one non-FIFA nationality.

No.	Pos.	Nation	Player
34	DF	ENG	Sean Hogan
36	FW	ENG	Daeshon Lawrence
40	MF	ENG	Harley Irwin
41	DF	ENG	Oliver Smith
54	DF	ENG	Toby Ritchie
—	GK	SCO	Jack Dallimore
—	DF	ENG	Jamie Grayson

No.	Pos.	Nation	Player
—	DF	ENG	Emile Oliver
—	MF	ENG	Harry Leigh
—	MF	ENG	Conor Lewis
—	MF	ENG	Harrison Rice
—	MF	ENG	Andrew Tutte (Player-coach)
—	FW	IRL	Mark Isong

=== Out on loan ===
Note: Flags indicate national team as defined under FIFA eligibility rules; some limited exceptions apply. Players may hold more than one non-FIFA nationality.

No.	Pos.	Nation	Player
7	FW	GBS	Carlos Mendes Gomes (on loan at Exeter City until 31 May 2026)
17	MF	ENG	Joel Randall (on loan at Blackpool until 31 May 2026)
23	MF	HUN	Szabolcs Schön (on loan at Győr until 27 May 2026)
32	DF	NIR	Sam Inwood (on loan at Aldershot Town until 31 May 2026)

No.	Pos.	Nation	Player
33	FW	ENG	Charlie Warren (on loan at Aldershot Town until 31 May 2026)
—	GK	ENG	Luke Hutchinson (on loan at Altrincham until 31 May 2026)
—	DF	ENG	Ajay Weston (on loan at FC United of Manchester until 31 May 2026)
—	FW	ENG	David Abimbola (on loan at Accrington Stanley until 31 May 2026)

== Transfers ==
=== In ===
Date	Pos.	Player	From	Fee	Ref.
12 June 2025	CM	(England) Xavier Simons	(England) Hull City	Undisclosed (Note: The transfer was reported to be around £300,000 by The Bolton News.)	
13 June 2025	RW	(England) Charlie Warren	(England) Felixstowe & Walton United	Undisclosed	
1 July 2025 (Note: The transfer was announced on 9 June, and would become official on 1 July once his Wrexham contract expired)	CF	(England) Sam Dalby	(Wales) Wrexham	Free	
1 July 2025 (Note: The transfer was announced on 13 June, and would become official on 1 July once his St Mirren contract expired)	LB	(England) Richard Taylor	(Scotland) St Mirren	Free	
4 July 2025	LW	(Barbados) Thierry Gale	(Austria) Rapid Wien	Undisclosed (Note: The transfer was reported to be around £600,000 by The Bolton News.)	
22 July 2025	GK	(England) Nathan Broome	(Wales) Swansea City	Free	
25 July 2025	CM	(Scotland) Ethan Erhahon	(England) Lincoln City	Undisclosed (Note: The transfer was reported to be around £750,000 by The Bolton News.)	
13 August 2025	GK	(United States) Tyler Miller	(England) Notts County	Free	
1 September 2025	RB	(Republic of Ireland) Cyrus Christie	(Wales) Swansea City	Free	
6 January 2026	CB	(Republic of Ireland) Lewis Temple	(Republic of Ireland) Shelbourne	Undisclosed	
14 January 2026	GK	(Republic of Ireland) Jack Bonham	(England) Stoke City	Undisclosed	
15 January 2026	GK	(Republic of Ireland) David Harrington	(England) Fleetwood Town	Undisclosed	
30 January 2026	CM	(Portugal) Rúben Rodrigues	(Brazil) Vitória	Free	

=== Out ===
Date	Pos.	Player	To	Fee	Ref.
19 June 2025	CF	(Wales) Aaron Collins	(England) Milton Keynes Dons	Undisclosed (Note: The transfer was reported to be around £800,000 by The Bolton News.)	
6 July 2025	GK	(Northern Ireland) Luke Southwood	(England) Bristol Rovers	Undisclosed	
21 July 2025	CM	(England) George Thomason	(Wales) Wrexham	Undisclosed (Note: The transfer was reported to be around £1.2 million by The Bolton News.)	
1 August 2025	AM	(Greece) Klaidi Lolos	(England) Peterborough United	Undisclosed	
1 September 2025	CF	(England) Dan Nlundulu	(Scotland) St Mirren	Mutual Consent	
2 January 2026	AM	(England) Dubem Eze	(England) Sutton United	Undisclosed	
8 January 2026	CB	(England) Will Forrester	(England) Leyton Orient	Undisclosed	
9 January 2026	CF	(Nigeria) Victor Adeboyejo	(England) Mansfield Town	Undisclosed	
15 January 2026	RB	(England) Josh Dacres-Cogley	(England) Stockport County	Undisclosed	
20 January 2026	GK	(United States) Tyler Miller	(United States) Charlotte FC	Undisclosed	
29 January 2026	CM	(England) Aaron Morley	(England) Wycombe Wanderers	Undisclosed (Note: The transfer was reported to be around £750,000 by The Bolton News, and may reach £1m with performance related add-ons.)	

=== Loaned in ===
Date	Pos.	Player	From	Date until	Ref.
20 June 2025	GK	(England) Teddy Sharman-Lowe	(England) Chelsea	14 January 2026 (Note: On 14 January, Sharman-Lowe was recalled early from his loan.)	
5 July 2025	RW	(England) Amario Cozier-Duberry	(England) Brighton & Hove Albion	31 May 2026	
28 July 2025	CF	(England) Mason Burstow	(England) Hull City	31 May 2026	
13 August 2025	LW	(Guinea) Ibrahim Cissoko	(France) Toulouse	31 May 2026	
1 September 2025	CF	(Finland) Marcus Forss	(England) Middlesbrough	31 May 2026	
27 January 2026	LW	(England) Corey Blackett-Taylor	(England) Derby County	31 May 2026	
28 January 2026	RW	(Scotland) Rob Apter	(England) Charlton Athletic	31 May 2026	
2 February 2026	CF	(Republic of Ireland) Johnny Kenny	(Scotland) Celtic	31 May 2026	

=== Loaned out ===
Date	Pos.	Player	To	Date until	Ref.
30 June 2025	AM	(England) Dubem Eze	(England) Scunthorpe United	2 January 2026 (Note: On 2 January, Eze was recalled early from his loan.)	
4 July 2025	LB	(England) Ajay Weston	(England) FC United of Manchester	31 May 2026 (Note: On 24 October, Weston's loan was extended until the end of the season.)	
15 July 2025	GK	(England) Luke Hutchinson	(England) Altrincham	31 May 2026	
1 September 2025	LM	(Hungary) Szabolcs Schön	(Hungary) Győr	31 May 2026	
1 September 2025	LW	(Guinea-Bissau) Carlos Mendes Gomes	(England) Exeter City	31 May 2026	
8 September 2025	GK	(Scotland) Jack Dallimore	(England) Atherton Collieries	3 January 2026	
8 September 2025	CF	(Republic of Ireland) Mark Isong	(England) Warrington Town	1 December 2026 (Note: On 1 December, Isong was recalled early from his loan.)	
18 October 2025	CB	(England) Oliver Smith	(England) FC Halifax Town	18 November 2025	
30 October 2025	CB	(Northern Ireland) Sam Inwood	(England) Aldershot Town	31 May 2026	
21 November 2025	CM	(Egypt) Sonny Sharples-Ahmed	(England) Torquay United	3 January 2026	
29 November 2025	GK	(England) Nathan Broome	(England) Rochdale	3 January 2026	
2 December 2025	CF	(England) Daeshon Lawrence	(England) FC United of Manchester	30 December 2025	
6 December 2025	GK	(England) Luke Lomax (Note: U18s player)	(England) Atherton Collieries	3 January 2026	
6 December 2025	CF	(Republic of Ireland) Mark Isong	(England) Atherton Collieries	3 January 2026	
19 December 2025	RW	(England) Charlie Warren	(England) Aldershot Town	31 May 2026 (Note: On 16 January, Warren's loan was extended until the end of the season.)	
19 December 2025	CM	(England) Harley Irwin	(England) Stafford Rangers	17 January 2026	
19 January 2026	AM	(England) Joel Randall	(England) Blackpool	31 May 2026	
26 January 2026	CM	(Egypt) Sonny Sharples-Ahmed	(England) Spennymoor Town	1 March 2026	
30 January 2026	CF	(England) David Abimbola	(England) Accrington Stanley	31 May 2026	

=== Released / Out of Contract ===
Date	Pos.	Player	Subsequent club	Join date	Ref.
30 June 2025	GK	(England) Nathan Baxter	(England) Watford	1 July 2025 (Note: The transfer was announced on 2 June, and would become official on 1 July once his contract expired)	
30 June 2025	RB	(Australia) Gethin Jones	(England) Milton Keynes Dons	1 July 2025 (Note: The transfer was announced on 12 June, and would become official on 1 July once his contract expired)	
30 June 2025	CB	(Cape Verde) Ricardo Santos	(Wales) Swansea City	1 July 2025 (Note: The transfer was announced on 6 June, and would become official on 1 July once his contract expired)	
30 June 2025	CF	(Scotland) Ben Andreucci	(England) Cleethorpes Town	5 July 2025	
30 June 2025	RB	(England) Luke Matheson	(England) Macclesfield	26 July 2025	
30 June 2025	LW	(Jamaica) Trevon Bryan	(Croatia) NK NAŠK	28 August 2025	
30 June 2025	GK	(England) Joel Coleman	(England) Millwall	28 August 2025	
30 June 2025	GK	(England) Ellis Litherland	(England) Huddersfield Town	6 September 2025	
30 June 2025	AM	(England) Harrison Fleury	(England) West Didsbury & Chorlton	26 September 2025	
30 June 2025	CF	(England) Yestin Shakespear	(England) Abbey Hey	1 November 2025	
30 June 2025	CB	(England) Noah Halford	(England) Clitheroe	4 November 2025	
30 June 2025	CB	(England) Joseph Toole	(England) Fleetwood Town		
30 June 2025	RM	(England) James Westwood			

=== New Contract ===
Date	Pos.	Player	End date	Ref.
7 May 2025	LB	(England) Max Conway	30 June 2026	
7 May 2025	GK	(Scotland) Jack Dallimore	30 June 2026	
7 May 2025	CB	(England) Sean Hogan	30 June 2026	
7 May 2025	CM	(Egypt) Sonny Sharples-Ahmed	30 June 2026	
17 June 2025	GK	(England) Luke Hutchinson	30 June 2027	
1 July 2025	CF	(England) David Abimbola	Undisclosed (Note: First professional contract)	
1 July 2025	RB	(England) Jamie Grayson	Undisclosed	
1 July 2025	CM	(England) Harley Irwin	Undisclosed	
1 July 2025	CF	(England) Daeshon Lawrence	Undisclosed	
1 July 2025	CM	(England) Harry Leigh	Undisclosed	
1 July 2025	AM	(England) Conor Lewis	Undisclosed	
1 July 2025	CB	(England) Emile Oliver	Undisclosed	
1 July 2025	LM	(England) Harrison Rice	Undisclosed	
1 July 2025	CB	(England) Oliver Smith	Undisclosed	
9 September 2025	CB	(Northern Ireland) Sam Inwood	30 June 2028 (Note: Option for a further year)	
9 September 2025	CM	(Egypt) Sonny Sharples-Ahmed	30 June 2027	
20 October 2025	LB	(England) Max Conway	30 June 2029	
26 January 2026	AM	(England) Toby Ritchie	30 June 2029	
27 January 2026	CF	(England) David Abimbola	30 June 2027	
20 February 2026	CM	(Wales) Josh Sheehan	30 June 2028	
24 March 2026	GK	(England) Luke Lomax	Undisclosed	
24 March 2026	CM	(Republic of Ireland) Jack Mawditt	Undisclosed	
24 March 2026	CB	(England) Sam O'Neill	Undisclosed	

== Pre-season and friendlies ==
On 20 May, Bolton Wanderers announced their first two pre-season friendlies, against Barrow and Shrewsbury Town. On 4 June, another fixture was announced against Hibernian. On 6 June, the club confirmed their final pre-season fixture of the schedule would be played at home to Preston North End. On 17 June, the club confirmed that a fixture against Orlando Pirates would take place during the club's training camp in Spain. On 30 June, fixtures were announced for the B-Team, against Atherton Collieries and Longridge Town.

Win Draw Loss Fixtures

5 July 2025 Friendly	Bolton Wanderers	1–1	Tranmere Rovers	Lostock
15:00 BST	McAtee 13'	Report	Davison 85'	Stadium: Eddie Davies Academy (Behind-closed-doors)

11 July 2025 Friendly	Bolton Wanderers	2–0	Orlando Pirates	Marbella
11:00 CET	Warren 38'; Johnston 61'	Report		Stadium: Marbella Football Centre

12 July 2025 Friendly	Bolton Wanderers B	1–3	FC Halifax Town	Lostock
15:00 BST	Ritchie 87'	Report	Pugh 55'; Cooke 80'; Bray 89'	Stadium: Eddie Davies Academy (Behind-closed-doors)

15 July 2025 Friendly	Barrow	0–1	Bolton Wanderers	Barrow-in-Furness
19:00 BST		Report	Conway 53'	Stadium: SO Legal Stadium

19 July 2025 Friendly	Hibernian	0–2	Bolton Wanderers	Edinburgh
14:00 BST		Report	Cozier-Duberry 56'; Sharples-Ahmed 86'	Stadium: Easter Road

19 July 2025 Friendly	Atherton Collieries	1–0	Bolton Wanderers B	Atherton
15:00 BST	Dwyer 19'	Report		Stadium: Dreams2Reality Stadium

22 July 2025 Friendly	Shrewsbury Town	2–5	Bolton Wanderers	Shrewsbury
19:00 BST	Stewart 53'; Gray 90'	Report	Gale 21'; Lawrence 29'; Dacres-Cogley 45'; Biggins 58' (o.g.); Conway 77'	Stadium: The Crowd Meadow

22 July 2025 Friendly	Longridge Town	2–4	Bolton Wanderers B	Longridge
19:00 BST	Hewitt 2'; Van Wyk 7'	Report	Trialist 42'; Isong 46'; C. Lewis 49'; L. Lewis 88'	Stadium: The Recycling Lives Ground

26 July 2025 Friendly	Bolton Wanderers	2–0	Preston North End	Bolton
15:00 BST	Cozer-Duberry 73'; Randall 76'	Report		Stadium: Toughsheet Community Stadium; Attendance: 8,115 (1,931 Preston); Referee: Simon Mather

== Competitions ==
=== Overall record ===
Competition	First match	Last match	Starting round	Final position	Record							
Competition	First match	Last match	Starting round	Final position	Pld	W	D	L	GF	GA	GD	Win %
League One	3 August 2025	2 May 2026	Matchday 1	5th	46	19	18	9	70	52	+18	41.30
FA Cup	1 November 2025	6 December 2025	First round	Second round	2	1	0	1	2	5	−3	50.00
EFL Cup	13 August 2025	13 August 2025	First round	First round	1	0	1	0	3	3	+0	0.00
EFL Trophy	2 September 2025	13 January 2026	Group stage	Round of 16	5	4	0	1	13	3	+10	80.00
Play-offs	9 May 2026	24 May 2026	Semi-Final	Winners	3	3	0	0	6	1	+5	100.00
Total					57	27	19	11	94	64	+30	47.37

Last updated: 24 May 2026
Source: Soccerway

=== League One ===
==== League table ====
Pos	Team	Pld	W	D	L	GF	GA	GD	Pts	Promotion, qualification or relegation
3	Stockport County	46	22	11	13	71	58	+13	77	Qualification for League One play-offs
4	Bradford City	46	22	11	13	58	51	+7	77	Qualification for League One play-offs
5	Bolton Wanderers (O, P)	46	19	18	9	70	52	+18	75	Qualification for League One play-offs
6	Stevenage	46	21	12	13	49	46	+3	75	Qualification for League One play-offs
7	Luton Town	46	21	11	14	68	56	+12	74	

Source: EFL Official Website
Rules for classification: 1) Points; 2) Goal difference; 3) Number of goals scored; 4) Head-to-head results; 5) Wins; 6) Away goals; 7) Penalty points (sec 9.5); 8) 12-point sending off offences
(O) Play-off winners; (P) Promoted

==== Results summary ====
Overall								Home						Away					
Pld	W	D	L	GF	GA	GD	Pts	W	D	L	GF	GA	GD	W	D	L	GF	GA	GD
46	19	18	9	70	52	+18	75	13	8	2	46	24	+22	6	10	7	24	28	−4

Last updated: 2 May 2026.
Source: Soccerway

==== Results by round ====
Round	1	2	3	4	5	6	7	8	9	10	11	12	13	14	15	17	18	19	20	21	22	23	24	25	26	27	16^{1}	28	29	30	31	32	33	34	35	36	37	38	39	41	42	43	40^{2}	44	45	46
Ground	A	H	A	H	H	A	H	A	H	A	H	A	A	H	H	H	A	A	H	A	H	H	A	H	A	A	A	H	H	A	H	A	A	H	A	H	A	H	A	A	H	A	H	H	A	H
Result	L	W	D	D	D	D	W	D	W	L	W	L	W	W	W	D	D	W	W	L	W	L	D	D	L	W	D	W	W	W	W	D	D	D	W	W	D	D	L	W	D	L	W	D	D	L
Position	22	13	13	15	14	14	10	12	10	11	8	9	7	7	3	6	6	5	4	6	4	6	6	4	6	5	5	3	3	3	3	3	3	3	3	3	3	3	3	3	4	4	3	3	3	5
Points	0	3	4	5	6	7	10	11	14	14	17	17	20	23	26	27	28	31	34	34	37	37	38	39	39	42	43	46	49	52	55	56	57	58	61	64	65	66	66	69	70	70	73	74	75	75

Source: Soccerway
W = Win; D = Draw; L = Loss; P = Postponed
Notes:
- ^{1} Matchday 16 (vs. Stevenage) was postponed due to international call-ups.
- ^{2} Matchday 40 (vs. Stevenage) was postponed due to international call-ups.

==== Matches ====
On 26 June, the League One fixtures were announced. It sees Bolton open their campaign on 3 August away at Stockport County, with the regular season concluding on 2 May at home to Luton Town.

Win Draw Loss Fixtures

3 August 2025 1	Stockport County	2–0	Bolton Wanderers	Stockport
12:00 BST	Mothersille 45+2'; Diamond (yellow card) 68'; Moxon (yellow card) 74'; Wootton 89'	Report	Simons (yellow card) 77'	Stadium: Edgeley Park; Attendance: 10,172; Referee: Elliot Bell
Note: Fixture was selected for live Sky Sports broadcasting.

9 August 2025 2	Bolton Wanderers	2–0	Plymouth Argyle	Bolton
15:00 BST	Johnston (yellow card) 14'; Toal 20'; Sheehan (yellow card) 45+2'; Burstow 60'	Report	Sorinola (yellow card) 55'; Ibrahim (yellow card) 63'; Mumba (yellow card) 87'; Watts (yellow card) 90'	Stadium: Toughsheet Community Stadium; Attendance: 21,570; Referee: Ross Joyce

16 August 2025 3	Barnsley	1–1	Bolton Wanderers	Barnsley
15:00 BST	Yoganathan (yellow card) 34' (yellow-red card) 52'; McGoldrick 48'; Farrugia (yellow card) 90+7'; Cooper (yellow card) 90+8'	Report	Burstow (yellow card) 34'; McAtee 86'; Morley (yellow card) 90+4'	Stadium: Oakwell; Attendance: 13,167; Referee: Leigh Doughty

20 August 2025 4	Bolton Wanderers	1–1	Reading	Bolton
20:00 BST	Burstow 52'	Report	O'Mahony (yellow card) 16'; Savage (yellow card) 43'; Doyle (yellow card) 65'; Kyerewaa (yellow card) 74'; Williams (yellow card) 78'; Garcia 84'	Stadium: Toughsheet Community Stadium; Attendance: 19,625 (358 away); Referee: Tom Reeves
Note: Fixture was originally scheduled for 19 August, but was moved live Sky Sports broadcasting.

23 August 2025 5	Bolton Wanderers	1–1	Lincoln City	Bolton
15:00 BST	Erhahon (yellow card) 22'; Conway (yellow card) 76'; Hamer 90+7' (o.g.)	Report	Draper 1'; Towler (yellow card) 60'; McGrandles (yellow card) 82'	Stadium: Toughsheet Community Stadium; Attendance: 19,938; Referee: Jacob Miles

30 August 2025 6	Blackpool	1–1	Bolton Wanderers	Blackpool
15:00 BST	Sharman-Lowe 13' (o.g.); Imray (yellow card) 38'	Report	Sheehan (yellow card) 35'; Burstow 61', (yellow card) 86'	Stadium: Bloomfield Road; Attendance: 11,579

6 September 2025 7	Bolton Wanderers	3–0	AFC Wimbledon	Bolton
15:00 BST	Burstow 29'; Cozier-Dubbery 53'; Randall 62'; Gale (yellow card) 69'; Forino-Joseph (yellow card) 71'	Report	Reeves (yellow card) 4'; Browne (red card) 50'; Lewis (yellow card) 74' (yellow-red card) 90'	Stadium: Toughsheet Community Stadium; Attendance: 20,157; Referee: Darren Drysdale

13 September 2025 8	Leyton Orient	1–1	Bolton Wanderers	Leyton
15:00 BST	Mitchell (yellow card) 29'; Simpson (yellow card) 39', (goal) 69'; James (yellow card) 89'	Report	Dacres-Cogley (yellow card) 28'; Johnston (yellow card) 87'; Cozier-Duberry 90+4'	Stadium: Brisbane Road; Attendance: 8,731; Referee: David Rock

20 September 2025 9	Bolton Wanderers	4–1	Wigan Athletic	Bolton
12:30 BST	Gale 15'; Forss 20', 50'; Burstow 42'	Report	Hungbo (yellow card) 45+6'; Mullin 54'	Stadium: Toughsheet Community Stadium; Attendance: 25,565; Referee: Ben Speedie
Note: Fixture was originally scheduled for a 15:00 kick-off, but was moved live Sky Sports broadcasting.

27 September 2025 10	Northampton Town	2–0	Bolton Wanderers	Northampton
15:00 BST	Hoskins (yellow card) 45+1', (goal) 73'; McGeehan 70'; Wormleighton (yellow card) 78'	Report	Forino-Joseph (yellow card) 86'	Stadium: Sixfields Stadium; Attendance: 7,366; Referee: Scott Oldham

4 October 2025 11	Bolton Wanderers	2–1	Peterborough United	Bolton
15:00 BST	Burstow 5', 21'; Sharman-Lowe (yellow card) 88'; Forino-Joseph (yellow card) 90+5'	Report	Kioso (yellow card) 26', (goal) 41'; Nevett (yellow card) 63'; Lisbie (yellow card) 88'	Stadium: Toughsheet Community Stadium; Attendance: 20,336; Referee: Seb Stockbridge

11 October 2025 12	Burton Albion	3–0	Bolton Wanderers	Burton
15:00 BST	Beesley 27' (pen.), 90+4'; Godwin-Malife (yellow card) 45+2'; Tavares 48'	Report	Cissoko (yellow card) 42'; Forss (yellow card) 90+9'	Stadium: Pirelli Stadium; Attendance: 4,725; Referee: Neil Hair

16 October 2025 13	Huddersfield Town	1–2	Bolton Wanderers	Huddersfield
20:00 BST	Castledine 7'; Taylor (yellow card) 36'	Report	Sheehan (yellow card) 27'; Cozier-Duberry (yellow card) 29', (goal) 90+5'; Taylor (yellow card) 85'; Dalby 90+3'; Burstow (yellow card) 90+6'	Stadium: Kirklees Stadium; Attendance: 17,201; Referee: Oliver Yates
Note: Fixture was originally scheduled for 18 October, but was rescheduled for live Sky Sports broadcasting.

25 October 2025 14	Bolton Wanderers	1–0	Cardiff City	Bolton
12:30 BST	Osei-Tutu (yellow card) 89'; Sheehan (yellow card) 90+2'; Cozier-Duberry 90+4'	Report	Ng (yellow card) 41'	Stadium: Toughsheet Community Stadium; Attendance: 22,587; Referee: Ben Toner
Note: Fixture was originally scheduled for a 15:00 kick-off, but was rescheduled for live Sky Sports broadcasting.

8 November 2025 15	Bolton Wanderers	4–0	Port Vale	Bolton
15:00 GMT	Cozier-Duberry 31', 68'; Simons 36'; Cissoko (yellow card) 54'; Dempsey 72'	Report	Humphreys (yellow card) 80'; Paton (yellow card) 90+1'	Stadium: Toughsheet Community Stadium; Attendance: 21,658; Referee: Martin Coy

22 November 2025 17	Bolton Wanderers	0–0	Bradford City	Bolton
15:00 GMT	Sheehan (yellow card) 38'; Johnston (yellow card) 67'	Report	Touray (yellow card) 17'; Pennington (yellow card) 29'; Power (yellow card) 90+4'	Stadium: Toughsheet Community Stadium; Attendance: 26,473; Referee: Darren Drysdale

29 November 2025 18	Luton Town	1–1	Bolton Wanderers	Luton
15:00 GMT	Lonwijk (yellow card) 57'; Kodua 83'	Report	Dempsey 8'; Simons (yellow card) 53' (yellow-red card) 70'; Dacres-Cogley (yellow card) 61'	Stadium: Kenilworth Road; Attendance: 11,204; Referee: Ruebyn Ricardo

9 December 2025 19	Mansfield Town	0–1	Bolton Wanderers	Mansfield
19:45 GMT	Oates (red card) 13'	Report	Johnston (yellow card) 6'; Osei-Tutu 40'	Stadium: Field Mill; Attendance: 7,628; Referee: Thomas Parsons

13 December 2025 20	Bolton Wanderers	2–1	Exeter City	Bolton
15:00 GMT	Dalby 70'; Gale 82'	Report	Aitchison 20'; Niskanen (yellow card) 73'; Swinkels (yellow card) 78'; Doyle-Hayes (yellow card) 80'; Sweeney (yellow card) 89'	Stadium: Toughsheet Community Stadium; Attendance: 20,622; Referee: Ben Speedie

20 December 2025 21	Wycombe Wanderers	2–1	Bolton Wanderers	High Wycombe
15:00 GMT	Grimmer 40'; Quitirna 43'; Woodrow (yellow card) 69'; Norris (yellow card) 90'	Report	Gale 16'	Stadium: Adams Park; Attendance: 6,197; Referee: Craig Hicks

26 December 2025 22	Bolton Wanderers	2–1	Rotherham United	Bolton
15:00 GMT	Sheehan 45+1', 90+3'; Conway (yellow card) 69'	Report	Martha (yellow card) 63'; Baptiste (yellow card) 85'; Nombe 90' (pen.)	Stadium: Toughsheet Community Stadium; Attendance: 23,416; Referee: Elliot Bell

29 December 2025 23	Bolton Wanderers	0–1	Mansfield Town	Bolton
19:45 GMT	Sheehan (yellow card) 58'; Cissoko (yellow card) 81'	Report	Hewitt (yellow card) 21'; Oates 43'; Moriah-Welsh (yellow card) 64'; Reed (yellow card) 84'	Stadium: Toughsheet Community Stadium; Attendance: 22,320; Referee: Peter Wright

1 January 2026 24	Doncaster Rovers	1–1	Bolton Wanderers	Doncaster
15:00 GMT	Middleton 54'; Bailey (yellow card) 75'; Clifton (yellow card) 81'	Report	Osei-Tutu (yellow card) 36'; Simons (yellow card) 47'; Dempsey (yellow card) 70', (goal) 78'	Stadium: Eco-Power Stadium; Attendance: 10,456; Referee: Martin Coy

4 January 2026 25	Bolton Wanderers	0–0	Northampton Town	Bolton
12:00 GMT		Report		Stadium: Toughsheet Community Stadium; Attendance: 20,333; Referee: Alex Chilowicz
Note: Fixture was originally scheduled for a 15:00 kick-off, but was rescheduled for live Sky Sports broadcasting.

10 January 2026 26	Peterborough United	3–1	Bolton Wanderers	Peterborough
15:00 GMT	Morgan 34'; Garbett 54'; Lisbie 66'; Kioso (yellow card) 81'	Report	Dalby 65'	Stadium: London Road Stadium; Attendance: 7,838; Referee: Oliver Yates

17 January 2026 27	Wigan Athletic	0–1	Bolton Wanderers	Wigan
12:30 GMT		Report	Sheehan (yellow card) 22', (goal) 82'	Stadium: Brick Community Stadium; Attendance: 15,112; Referee: Stephen Martin
Note: Fixture was originally scheduled for a 15:00 kick-off, but was moved following an agreement between the two sides.

20 January 2026 16	Stevenage	0–0	Bolton Wanderers	Stevenage
19:45 GMT		Report	Johnston (yellow card) 83'	Stadium: Broadhall Way; Attendance: 3,156; Referee: Stephen Parkinson
Note: Fixture was initially scheduled for 15 November, but was moved to 20 January due to international call-ups.

24 January 2026 28	Bolton Wanderers	2–1	Leyton Orient	Bolton
15:00 GMT	Osei-Tutu (yellow card) 13'; Christie (yellow card) 33'; Gale 46'; McAtee (yellow card) 70'; Burstow 90+1' (pen.)	Report	Abdulai (yellow card) 29'; Archibald 49'	Stadium: Toughsheet Community Stadium; Attendance: 20,352; Referee: Seb Stockbridge

27 January 2026 29	Bolton Wanderers	2–1	Burton Albion	Bolton
19:45 GMT	Dalby 50', 90+3', (yellow card) 66'; Christie (yellow card) 54'; Osei-Tutu (yellow card) 86'	Report	Armer 69'; Godwin-Malife (yellow card) 81'	Stadium: Toughsheet Community Stadium; Attendance: 18,820; Referee: Thomas Parsons

31 January 2026 30	AFC Wimbledon	0–1	Bolton Wanderers	Wimbledon
15:00 GMT	Smith (yellow card) 90+5'	Report	Blackett-Taylor 13'; McAtee (yellow card) 60'	Stadium: Plough Lane; Attendance: 8,659; Referee: Andrew Humphries

7 February 2026 31	Bolton Wanderers	3–2	Barnsley	Bolton
15:01 GMT	Dalby 5', 19'; Dempsey (yellow card) 29'; McAtee 32'; Forino-Joseph (yellow card) 45+2'; Johnston (yellow card) 77'	Report	Connell 57'; Phillips 60'; Bland (yellow card) 79'; Shepherd (yellow card) 88'	Stadium: Toughsheet Community Stadium; Attendance: 21,415; Referee: Scott Oldham
Note: Kick off was pushed back one minute for EFL's Every Minute Matters campaign.

14 February 2026 32	Lincoln City	1–1	Bolton Wanderers	Lincoln
15:00 GMT	Draper (yellow card) 17'; Varfolomeev (yellow card) 22'; Moylan 25'; Oné (yellow card) 90+4'	Report	Erhahon (yellow card) 23'; Dempsey (yellow card) 35'; Dalby (yellow card) 45', (goal) 82'; Sheehan (yellow card) 88'; Kenny (yellow card) 90+3'	Stadium: Sincil Bank; Attendance: 10,235; Referee: William Finnie

17 February 2026 33	Reading	1–1	Bolton Wanderers	Reading
20:00 GMT	O'Connor (yellow card) 27'; Marriott 36'; Doyle (yellow card) 42'; Savage (yellow card) 80'; Ehibhatiomhan (yellow card) 85'	Report	Burstow 90+6'; Forino-Joseph (yellow card) 90+10'	Stadium: Madejski Stadium; Attendance: 10,025; Referee: Peter Wight

21 February 2026 34	Bolton Wanderers	2–2	Blackpool	Bolton
15:00 GMT	Toal 66'; Burstow 85'; Gale (yellow card) 90'	Report	Horsfall (yellow card) 18'; Coulson 73'; Honeyman 77'; Walters (yellow card) 81'; Bowler (yellow card) 90+6'	Stadium: Toughsheet Community Stadium; Attendance: 23,172; Referee: Richard Eley

28 February 2026 35	Exeter City	1–5	Bolton Wanderers	Exeter
15:00 GMT	Fitzwater (yellow card) 39'; Magennis (yellow card) 45+2'; Wareham 67'	Report	Dalby 21'; Johnston (yellow card) 35', (goal) 90+4'; Kenny 60'; Gale 72'; Cissoko 77'	Stadium: St James Park; Attendance: 7,341; Referee: Craig Hicks

7 March 2026 36	Bolton Wanderers	3–2	Wycombe Wanderers	Bolton
15:00 GMT	Osei-Tutu (yellow card) 56'; Kenny (yellow card) 76'; Rodrigues 88'; Burstow 90+1'; Blackett-Taylor 90+5', (yellow card) 90+6'	Report	Woodrow 27', (yellow card) 87'; Harris 41'; Allen (yellow card) 56'; Harvie (yellow card) 58'; Boyd-Munce (yellow card) 71'	Stadium: Toughsheet Community Stadium; Attendance: 20,512; Referee: Matthew Corlett

14 March 2026 37	Rotherham United	2–2	Bolton Wanderers	Rotherham
12:30 GMT	Rafferty (yellow card) 38'; Nombe 39', 42'; Cover (yellow card) 48'; Cann (yellow card) 57'	Report	Erhahon (yellow card) 13'; Forino-Joseph 51'; Dalby 83'	Stadium: New York Stadium; Attendance: 9,348; Referee: James Oldham
Note: Fixture was initially scheduled for a 15:00 kick-off, but was brought forward for Sky Sports broadcasting.

17 March 2026 38	Bolton Wanderers	0–0	Doncaster Rovers	Bolton
19:45 GMT	Dempsey (yellow card) 58'; Toal (yellow card) 90+7'	Report	Gotts (yellow card) 45+1'; Pearson (yellow card) 54'; Sterry (yellow card) 90+6'; Byrne (yellow card) 90+8'	Stadium: Toughsheet Community Stadium; Attendance: 19,570; Referee: Darren Drysdale

21 March 2026 39	Port Vale	1–0	Bolton Wanderers	Burslem
15:00 GMT	Hall 34'	Report	Osei-Tutu (yellow card) 21'; Erhahon (yellow card) 60'	Stadium: Vale Park; Attendance: 8,442; Referee: Tom Reeves

3 April 2026 41	Plymouth Argyle	1–2	Bolton Wanderers	Plymouth
15:00 BST	Curtis 57'	Report	Sheehan (yellow card) 18'; McAtee (red card) 42'; Rodrigues (yellow card) 45+2'; Kenny 49' (pen.); Dalby (Note: This goal, originally attributed to as own goal and still listed as such by most sources, was later credited to Dalby by the Dubious Goals Committee.) 70'	Stadium: Home Park; Attendance: 16,616; Referee: Charles Breakspear

6 April 2026 42	Bolton Wanderers	2–2	Stockport County	Bolton
15:00 BST	Kenny 39'; Osborn 79' (o.g.)	Report	Sidibeh 45+3', (yellow card) 80'; Edun 51'; Barry (yellow card) 89' (yellow-red card) 90+4'	Stadium: Toughsheet Community Stadium; Attendance: 23,855; Referee: Stephen Martin

11 April 2026 43	Cardiff City	2–0	Bolton Wanderers	Cardiff
12:30 BST	Kellyman 50'; Willock 52'; Bagan (yellow card) 70'	Report		Stadium: Cardiff City Stadium; Attendance: 21,640; Referee: Elliot Bell
Note: Fixture was initially scheduled for a 15:00 kick-off, but was brought forward for Sky Sports broadcasting.

14 April 2026 40	Bolton Wanderers	5–1	Stevenage	Bolton
19:45 BST	Cozier-Duberry 13', 49'; Kenny 30'; Rodrigues 67'; Burstow 81'	Report	Phillips (red card) 42'; Kemp 64'; Earley (yellow card) 90+2'	Stadium: Toughsheet Community Stadium; Attendance: 19,177; Referee: Thomas Parsons
Note: Fixture was initially scheduled for 28 March, but was moved due to international call-ups.

18 April 2026 44	Bolton Wanderers	3–3	Huddersfield Town	Bolton
12:30 BST	Toal 14', (yellow card) 80'; Johnston (yellow card) 51'; Osei-Tutu (red card) 53'; Kenny 77', (yellow card) 90+5'; Cissoko 90+11'; Gale (yellow card) 90+12'	Report	Ledson (yellow card) 11'; Kasumu 52', 66'; Harness 55' (pen.), (yellow card) 64'; Humphreys (yellow card) 61'; Balker (yellow card) 90+1'; Sørensen (yellow card) 90+9'	Stadium: Toughsheet Community Stadium; Attendance: 21,891; Referee: Jacob Miles
Note: Fixture was initially scheduled for a 15:00 kick-off, but was brought forward for Sky Sports broadcasting.

25 April 2026 45	Bradford City	1–1	Bolton Wanderers	Bradford
15:00 BST	Neufville (yellow card) 15'; Wright (yellow card) 36'; Jackson 80'	Report	Kenny 72'; Johnston (yellow card) 79'; Forino-Joseph (yellow card) 90+1'	Stadium: Valley Parade; Attendance: 23,732; Referee: Seb Stockbridge

2 May 2026 46	Bolton Wanderers	2–3	Luton Town	Bolton
15:00 BST	Conway (yellow card) 13'; Osei-Tutu 20'; Cissoko 45+3', (yellow card) 60'; Forino-Joseph (yellow card) 63'; Sheehan (yellow card) 78'	Report	Clark 15' (pen.); Walsh (yellow card) 35'; Odoffin 62'; Palmer (yellow card) 63'; Van den Berg (yellow card) 88'; Morris 90+3'	Stadium: Toughsheet Community Stadium; Attendance: 25,555; Referee: Matthew Corlett

==== Play-offs ====
Bolton Wanderers finished 5th in the regular 2025–26 EFL League One season and, as a result, were drawn against 4th placed Bradford City in the Play-off Semi Final. The first leg took place at Toughsheet Community Stadium and the second leg took place at Valley Parade. They won both legs, advancing 2-0 on aggregate to face fellow Greater Manchester side Stockport County in the final for promotion to the EFL Championship.

9 May 2026 Semi-final (1st leg)	Bolton Wanderers	1–0	Bradford City	Bolton
20:00 BST	Cozier-Duberry 60'; Cissoko (yellow card) 89'	Report	Neufville (yellow card) 33'	Stadium: Toughsheet Community Stadium; Attendance: 22,789; Referee: Martin Coy

14 May 2026 Semi-final (2nd leg)	Bradford City	0–1 (0–2 agg.)	Bolton Wanderers	Bradford
20:00 BST	Baldwin (yellow card) 90+1'	Report	Simons 81'	Stadium: Valley Parade; Attendance: 22,381; Referee: Thomas Kirk

24 May 2026 Final	Bolton Wanderers	4–1	Stockport County	Wembley
13:00 BST	Rodrigues 3', 90+4' (pen.); Wootton 64' (o.g.); Dalby 81'	Report	Sidibeh 29'; Wootton (yellow card) 60'; Bailey (yellow card) 80'; Dacres-Cogley (red card) 90+2'	Stadium: Wembley Stadium; Attendance: 48,268; Referee: Josh Smith

=== FA Cup ===
Bolton were drawn at home to Huddersfield Town in the first round. In the second round, Bolton were drawn away to Swindon Town.

Win Draw Loss Fixtures

1 November 2025 First round	Bolton Wanderers	2–1	Huddersfield Town	Bolton
15:00 GMT	Cissoko 41'; Taylor 69'	Report	Ledson (yellow card) 45+1'; Radulović 63'; Low (yellow card) 90+1'	Stadium: Toughsheet Community Stadium; Attendance: 6,077; Referee: Ross Joyce

6 December 2025 Second round	Swindon Town	4–0	Bolton Wanderers	Swindon
15:00 GMT	Drinan 8' (pen.), 76', 86'; Clarke (yellow card) 49'; Snowdon 55'	Report	Taylor (yellow card) 53'	Stadium: County Ground; Attendance: 9,364; Referee: Lee Swabey

=== EFL Cup ===
On 26 June, the draw for the first round was made, with Bolton being draw at home to Sheffield Wednesday.

Win Draw Loss Fixtures

13 August 2025 First round	Bolton Wanderers	3–3 (2–4 p)	Sheffield Wednesday	Bolton
19:45 BST	Inwood (red card) 27'; Osei-Tutu 36'; Forino-Joseph (yellow card) 45'; Gale 77'; Cozier-Duberry 90+2'	Report	Siqueira 8'; Ugbo 37'; Thornton (yellow card) 70'; Johnson 80'	Stadium: Toughsheet Community Stadium; Attendance: 8,208 (3,148 away); Referee: Oliver Langford
	Penalties
	Morley (penalty missed); Cozier-Duberry (penalty scored); Burstow (penalty scored); Conway (penalty missed)		McNeill (penalty scored); J. Lowe (penalty scored); M. Lowe (penalty scored); Palmer (penalty scored)

=== EFL Trophy ===
In the group stage, Bolton were drawn into Northern Group E alongside Rotherham United, Oldham Athletic and Manchester City U21s. After advancing to the knockout stage, Bolton were drawn at home to Bradford City in the Round of 32. In the Round of 16, they were drawn at home Port Vale.

==== Group stage ====
Pos	Div	Team	Pld	W	PW	PL	L	GF	GA	GD	Pts	Qualification
1	L1	Bolton Wanderers	3	3	0	0	0	10	2	+8	9	Advance to Round 2
2	L1	Rotherham United	3	2	0	0	1	7	5	+2	6	Advance to Round 2
3	ACA	Manchester City U21	3	1	0	0	2	7	8	−1	3	
4	L2	Oldham Athletic	3	0	0	0	3	5	14	−9	0	

Source: EFL

Win Draw Loss Fixtures

2 September 2025 Group game 1	Bolton Wanderers	1–0	Rotherham United	Bolton
19:00 BST	Gale 37', (red card) 45+2'; Taylor (yellow card) 86'	Report	Kaleta (yellow card) 52'; Jules (yellow card) 90+3'	Stadium: Toughsheet Community Stadium; Attendance: Andrew Humphries; Referee: 2,063

23 September 2025 Group game 2	Bolton Wanderers	3–0	Manchester City U21s	Bolton
19:00 BST	Dalby (yellow card) 7', (goal) 9'; McAtee 14'; Morley 23'	Report	Mbete (yellow card) 64'	Stadium: Toughsheet Community Stadium; Attendance: 2,763; Referee: Dale Baines

11 November 2025 Group game 3	Oldham Athletic	2–6	Bolton Wanderers	Oldham
19:00 GMT	Drummond 78'; Morris 88'; Woods (yellow card) 90+3'	Report	Osei-Tutu 44'; Dacres-Cogley (yellow card) 45+3'; McAtee 48'; Forss 63', 65'; Dempsey (yellow card) 74'; Ritchie 80'; Dalby 83'	Stadium: Boundary Park; Attendance: 2,392; Referee: Greg Rollason

==== Knockout stage ====
2 December 2025 Round of 32	Bolton Wanderers	3–0	Bradford City	Bolton
19:00 GMT	Cissoko 11', 20'; Forss 69'	Report	Neufville (yellow card) 70'; Touray (yellow card) 71'	Stadium: Toughsheet Community Stadium; Attendance: 2,500; Referee: David Rock

13 January 2026 Round of 16	Bolton Wanderers	0–1	Port Vale	Bolton
19:00 GMT	Forss (yellow card) 31'; Forino-Joseph (yellow card) 38'; Christie (yellow card) 68'; Gale (yellow card) 90+6'	Report	Waine 90'; Croasdale (yellow card) 90+4'	Stadium: Toughsheet Community Stadium; Attendance: 1,955; Referee: Jamie O'Connor

== Statistics ==
=== Appearances and goals ===
As of match played 24 May 2026

Players with no appearances are not included on the list; italics indicate loaned in player

No.	Pos	Nat	Player	Total		League One		FA Cup		EFL Cup		EFL Trophy		Play-Offs	
No.	Pos	Nat	Player	Apps	Goals	Apps	Goals	Apps	Goals	Apps	Goals	Apps	Goals	Apps	Goals
1	GK	(Republic of Ireland) IRL	Jack Bonham	24	0	21+0	0	0+0	0	0+0	0	0+0	0	3+0	0
3	DF	(Saint Lucia) LCA	Chris Forino-Joseph	36	1	26+2	1	1+0	0	1+0	0	2+1	0	3+0	0
4	MF	(England) ENG	Xavier Simons	38	2	23+9	1	0+0	0	0+0	0	3+0	0	1+2	1
5	DF	(England) ENG	Richard Taylor	14	1	1+6	0	2+0	1	0+0	0	5+0	0	0+0	0
6	DF	(Scotland) SCO	George Johnston	50	1	43+0	1	1+0	0	0+1	0	2+0	0	3+0	0
8	MF	(Wales) WAL	Josh Sheehan	46	3	29+9	3	2+0	0	0+0	0	2+1	0	3+0	0
9	FW	(Republic of Ireland) IRL	Johnny Kenny	14	6	11+3	6	0+0	0	0+0	0	0+0	0	0+0	0
10	FW	(England) ENG	Sam Dalby	51	14	23+18	11	2+0	0	0+0	0	5+0	2	0+3	1
11	FW	(Barbados) BRB	Thierry Gale	42	7	20+16	5	1+0	0	0+1	1	2+0	1	1+1	0
13	GK	(England) ENG	Nathan Broome	1	0	0+0	0	0+0	0	0+0	0	1+0	0	0+0	0
14	DF	(England) ENG	Jordi Osei-Tutu	42	4	29+7	2	0+1	0	1+0	1	1+0	1	3+0	0
15	FW	(Scotland) SCO	Rob Apter	13	0	9+4	0	0+0	0	0+0	0	0+0	0	0+0	0
18	DF	(Northern Ireland) NIR	Eoin Toal	42	3	36+1	3	2+0	0	0+0	0	1+0	0	2+0	0
19	MF	(England) ENG	Amario Cozier-Duberry	41	10	30+4	8	2+0	0	0+1	1	0+1	0	3+0	1
20	FW	(Guinea) GUI	Ibrahim Cissoko	34	6	11+16	3	1+0	1	0+0	0	2+1	2	2+1	0
21	MF	(Scotland) SCO	Ethan Erhahon	37	0	22+8	0	0+1	0	1+0	0	1+2	0	2+0	0
22	MF	(England) ENG	Kyle Dempsey	33	3	15+14	3	0+1	0	0+0	0	1+2	0	0+0	0
24	FW	(Finland) FIN	Marcus Forss	25	5	9+9	2	0+2	0	0+0	0	4+1	3	0+0	0
25	DF	(England) ENG	Max Conway	48	0	35+6	0	0+2	0	0+1	0	0+1	0	1+2	0
27	MF	(Portugal) POR	Rúben Rodrigues	15	4	6+6	2	0+0	0	0+0	0	0+0	0	3+0	2
28	MF	(Egypt) EGY	Sonny Sharples-Ahmed	1	0	0+0	0	0+0	0	0+0	0	0+1	0	0+0	0
29	DF	(Republic of Ireland) IRL	Cyrus Christie	30	0	12+11	0	1+1	0	0+0	0	4+0	0	0+1	0
34	DF	(England) ENG	Sean Hogan	1	0	0+0	0	0+0	0	0+0	0	1+0	0	0+0	0
35	FW	(England) ENG	Corey Blackett-Taylor	7	2	5+2	2	0+0	0	0+0	0	0+0	0	0+0	0
36	FW	(England) ENG	Daeshon Lawrence	2	0	0+0	0	0+0	0	1+0	0	0+1	0	0+0	0
40	MF	(England) ENG	Harley Irwin	1	0	0+0	0	0+0	0	0+0	0	0+1	0	0+0	0
41	DF	(England) ENG	Oliver Smith	2	0	0+0	0	0+0	0	0+0	0	1+1	0	0+0	0
45	FW	(England) ENG	John McAtee	32	4	7+16	2	0+0	0	1+0	0	4+1	2	0+3	0
48	FW	(England) ENG	Mason Burstow	53	12	29+16	12	0+2	0	0+1	0	0+2	0	3+0	0
54	MF	(England) ENG	Toby Ritchie	2	1	0+1	0	0+0	0	0+0	0	0+1	1	0+0	0
Players who featured but departed the club permanently during the season:
1	GK	(England) ENG	Teddy Sharman-Lowe	23	0	22+0	0	0+0	0	0+0	0	1+0	0	0+0	0
2	DF	(England) ENG	Josh Dacres-Cogley	18	0	11+2	0	1+0	0	1+0	0	2+1	0	0+0	0
15	DF	(England) ENG	Will Forrester	2	0	0+0	0	0+0	0	0+0	0	2+0	0	0+0	0
16	MF	(England) ENG	Aaron Morley	28	1	8+12	0	2+0	0	1+0	0	4+1	1	0+0	0
27	GK	(United States) USA	Tyler Miller	9	0	3+0	0	2+0	0	1+0	0	3+0	0	0+0	0
Players who featured but departed the club on loan during the season:
7	FW	(Guinea-Bissau) GBS	Carlos Mendes Gomes	2	0	1+0	0	0+0	0	1+0	0	0+0	0	0+0	0
17	MF	(England) ENG	Joel Randall	20	1	9+6	1	2+0	0	0+0	0	0+3	0	0+0	0
32	DF	(Northern Ireland) NIR	Sam Inwood	1	0	0+0	0	0+0	0	1+0	0	0+0	0	0+0	0
33	FW	(England) ENG	Charlie Warren	5	0	0+1	0	0+0	0	1+0	0	1+2	0	0+0	0

=== Goals record ===
As of match played 24 May 2026

Rank	No.	Nat.	Po.	Name	League One	FA Cup	EFL Cup	EFL Trophy	Play-Offs	Total
1	10	(England)	CF	Sam Dalby	11	0	0	2	1	14
2	48	(England)	CF	Mason Burstow	12	0	0	0	0	12
3	19	(England)	RW	Amario Cozier-Duberry	8	0	1	0	1	10
4	11	(Barbados)	LW	Thierry Gale	5	0	1	1	0	7
5=	9	(Republic of Ireland)	CF	Johnny Kenny	6	0	0	0	0	6
5=	20	(Guinea)	LW	Ibrahim Cissoko	3	1	0	2	0	6
7	24	(Finland)	CF	Marcus Forss	2	0	0	3	0	5
8=	14	(England)	RB	Jordi Osei-Tutu	2	0	1	1	0	4
8=	27	(Portugal)	CM	Rúben Rodrigues	2	0	0	0	2	4
8=	45	(England)	CF	John McAtee	2	0	0	2	0	4
11=	8	(Wales)	CM	Josh Sheehan	3	0	0	0	0	3
11=	18	(Northern Ireland)	CB	Eoin Toal	3	0	0	0	0	3
11=	22	(England)	CM	Kyle Dempsey	3	0	0	0	0	3
14=	4	(England)	CM	Xavier Simons	1	0	0	0	1	2
14=	35	(England)	LW	Corey Blackett-Taylor	2	0	0	0	0	2
16=	3	(Saint Lucia)	CB	Chris Forino-Joseph	1	0	0	0	0	1
16=	5	(England)	LB	Richard Taylor	0	1	0	0	0	1
16=	6	(Scotland)	CB	George Johnston	1	0	0	0	0	1
16=	16	(England)	CM	Aaron Morley	0	0	0	1	0	1
16=	17	(England)	AM	Joel Randall	1	0	0	0	0	1
16=	54	(England)	AM	Toby Ritchie	0	0	0	1	0	1
Own Goals					2	0	0	0	1	3
Total					70	2	3	13	6	94

=== Disciplinary record ===
As of match played 24 May 2026

Rank	No.	Nat.	Po.	Name	League One			FA Cup			EFL Cup			EFL Trophy			Play-Offs			Total		
Rank	No.	Nat.	Po.	Name	Yellow card	(yellow card) (yellow-red card)	Red card	Yellow card	(yellow card) (yellow-red card)	Red card	Yellow card	(yellow card) (yellow-red card)	Red card	Yellow card	(yellow card) (yellow-red card)	Red card	Yellow card	(yellow card) (yellow-red card)	Red card	Yellow card	(yellow card) (yellow-red card)	Red card
1	8	(Wales)	CM	Josh Sheehan	10	0	0	0	0	0	0	0	0	0	0	0	0	0	0	10	0	0
2=	3	(Saint Lucia)	CB	Chris Forino-Joseph	7	0	0	0	0	0	1	0	0	1	0	0	0	0	0	9	0	0
2=	6	(Scotland)	CB	George Johnston	9	0	0	0	0	0	0	0	0	0	0	0	0	0	0	9	0	0
2=	14	(England)	RB	Jordi Osei-Tutu	6	0	1	0	0	0	0	0	0	0	0	0	0	0	0	6	0	1
5	11	(Barbados)	LW	Thierry Gale	3	0	0	0	0	0	0	0	0	1	0	1	0	0	0	4	0	1
6=	20	(Guinea)	LW	Ibrahim Cissoko	4	0	0	0	0	0	0	0	0	0	0	0	1	0	0	5	0	0
6=	22	(England)	CM	Kyle Dempsey	4	0	0	0	0	0	0	0	0	1	0	0	0	0	0	5	0	0
6=	45	(England)	CF	John McAtee	2	0	1	0	0	0	0	0	0	0	0	0	0	0	0	2	0	1
9=	4	(England)	CM	Xavier Simons	2	1	0	0	0	0	0	0	0	0	0	0	0	0	0	2	1	0
9=	21	(Scotland)	CM	Ethan Erhahon	4	0	0	0	0	0	0	0	0	0	0	0	0	0	0	4	0	0
11=	2	(England)	RB	Josh Dacres-Cogley	2	0	0	0	0	0	0	0	0	1	0	0	0	0	0	3	0	0
11=	5	(England)	LB	Richard Taylor	1	0	0	1	0	0	0	0	0	1	0	0	0	0	0	3	0	0
11=	9	(Republic of Ireland)	CF	Johnny Kenny	3	0	0	0	0	0	0	0	0	0	0	0	0	0	0	3	0	0
11=	10	(England)	CF	Sam Dalby	2	0	0	0	0	0	0	0	0	1	0	0	0	0	0	3	0	0
11=	25	(England)	LB	Max Conway	3	0	0	0	0	0	0	0	0	0	0	0	0	0	0	3	0	0
11=	29	(Republic of Ireland)	RB	Cyrus Christie	2	0	0	0	0	0	0	0	0	1	0	0	0	0	0	3	0	0
11=	32	(Northern Ireland)	CB	Sam Inwood	0	0	0	0	0	0	0	0	1	0	0	0	0	0	0	0	0	1
11=	48	(England)	CF	Mason Burstow	3	0	0	0	0	0	0	0	0	0	0	0	0	0	0	3	0	0
19=	18	(Northern Ireland)	CB	Eoin Toal	2	0	0	0	0	0	0	0	0	0	0	0	0	0	0	2	0	0
19=	24	(Finland)	CF	Marcus Forss	1	0	0	0	0	0	0	0	0	1	0	0	0	0	0	2	0	0
21=	1	(England)	GK	Teddy Sharman-Lowe	1	0	0	0	0	0	0	0	0	0	0	0	0	0	0	1	0	0
21=	16	(England)	CM	Aaron Morley	1	0	0	0	0	0	0	0	0	0	0	0	0	0	0	1	0	0
21=	19	(England)	RW	Amario Cozier-Duberry	1	0	0	0	0	0	0	0	0	0	0	0	0	0	0	1	0	0
21=	27	(Portugal)	CM	Rúben Rodrigues	1	0	0	0	0	0	0	0	0	0	0	0	0	0	0	1	0	0
21=	35	(England)	LW	Corey Blackett-Taylor	1	0	0	0	0	0	0	0	0	0	0	0	0	0	0	1	0	0
Total					75	1	2	1	0	0	1	0	1	8	0	1	1	0	0	86	1	4
