= Sam Dalby =

English footballer (born 1999)

Personal information
- Full name: Samuel George Dalby
- Date of birth: 7 December 1999 (age 26)
- Place of birth: Leytonstone, England
- Height: 1.90 m (6 ft 3 in)
- Position: Striker

Team information
- Current team: Bolton Wanderers
- Number: 10

Youth career
- Buckhurst Hill
- –2016: Leyton Orient

Senior career*
| Years | Team | Apps | (Gls) |
| 2016–2018 | Leyton Orient | 18 | (1) |
| 2018–2019 | Leeds United | 0 | (0) |
| 2019 | → Morecambe (loan) | 2 | (0) |
| 2019–2021 | Watford | 0 | (0) |
| 2021 | → Stockport County (loan) | 4 | (0) |
| 2021 | → Woking (loan) | 14 | (1) |
| 2021–2022 | Southend United | 43 | (9) |
| 2022–2025 | Wrexham | 73 | (7) |
| 2024–2025 | → Dundee United (loan) | 35 | (15) |
| 2025– | Bolton Wanderers | 55 | (17) |
- * Club domestic league appearances and goals as of 22:10, 3 November 2026 (UTC)

Samuel George Dalby (born 7 December 1999) is an English professional footballer who plays as a striker for EFL Championship club Bolton Wanderers.

== Club career ==
=== Leyton Orient ===
Dalby made his debut for Leyton Orient in the 3–1 win over Stevenage in the EFL Trophy on 30 August 2016, coming on as a substitute for Jordan Bowery. He became one of the youngest Orient players in the club's history, aged 16 years and 226 days.

After scoring 11 goals in 19 appearances for Orient's U18 side, Dalby signed a professional contract with the club in December 2016. He made his league debut as a second-half substitute for Robbie Weir in the 1–0 defeat at Wycombe Wanderers on 17 December 2016.

Dalby made his full debut in the Leyton Orient starting eleven against Crawley Town in League Two on 26 December 2016, also scoring the first goal in the 3–2 win. After impressing in his debut season at Orient, he went on trial at Premier League side Crystal Palace in the summer of 2017.

=== Leeds United ===
On 23 January 2018, Dalby was signed by EFL Championship side Leeds United for an undisclosed fee on a two-and-a-half-year contract. On 19 March, Dalby impressed for Leeds United Under-23s in a victory against Ipswich, with it being described as a 'coming of age performance', after scoring his 4th goal in 6 games for the squad.

On 3 March 2018, Dalby was named in Leeds' first team for their travelling squad for the EFL Championship game against Fulham at Craven Cottage, however he was not named amongst the substitutes. On 8 May, he was named in Leeds' first team squad by head coach Paul Heckingbottom for their post season friendlies tour to Myanmar.

Dalby scored his first goal for Leeds' first team when he scored for Leeds under new head coach Marcelo Bielsa in their pre-season friendly 1–1 draw against York City on 20 July 2018. On 26 July 2018, Dalby was given the number 41 shirt for the upcoming 2018–19 season for Leeds.

On 31 January 2019, Dalby joined League Two side Morecambe on loan until the end of the season. He made his debut on 9 February in a 3–2 defeat against Bury and in total made 2 substitute appearances.

=== Watford ===
On 12 July 2019, Dalby joined Premier League club Watford for an undisclosed fee, signing a two-year deal with an additional one-year option. He was part of their development squad during the 2019–20 season. On 28 July 2019, Dalby scored a hat-trick whilst playing for Watford U23s against a RB Leipzig U19 side in a friendly match. He was also selected in the matchday squad for Watford's EFL Cup fourth round defeat to Everton on 29 October 2019, but ultimately remained an unused substitute.

On 19 February 2021, Dalby joined National League side Stockport County on loan for one month.

On 22 March 2021, Dalby returned to the National League to join Woking on loan for the remainder of the campaign.

On 18 May 2021, it was announced that Dalby would leave Watford upon the expiry of his contract in June.

=== Southend United ===
On 28 July 2021, Dalby was announced to have joined recently relegated National League side Southend United on a two-year deal.

=== Wrexham ===
On 1 August 2022, Dalby signed for Wrexham for an undisclosed fee on a two-year deal with the option for a further year. On 16 August, he made his debut for the club coming on off the bench in a 2–0 defeat to Chesterfield. On 24 September, Dalby scored his first goal for Wrexham in a 6–0 home victory against Torquay. On 6 November, he scored his first ever FA Cup goal in a 3–0 win against Oldham Athletic where he also got an assist.

==== Dundee United (loan) ====
On 30 August 2024, Dalby signed for Dundee United on a season-long loan. He scored ten goals in the first half of the Scottish Premiership season, including an 88th-minute winner in a 2–1 win for Dundee United against Dundee in the Dundee derby on 2 January 2025.

On 24 January 2025, it was confirmed that Dalby would remain with Dundee United until the conclusion of the Scottish Premiership season. Dalby departed both Dundee United and parent club Wrexham at the end of the season.

=== Bolton Wanderers ===
With his contract up at Wrexham, Dalby signed a four-year contract with Bolton Wanderers on 9 June 2025. He officially joined the club when his contract expired on 30 June.

== Style of play ==
Dalby's style of play has been likened to English striker Harry Kane, due to his stature, finishing and hold up play. He was described as a special talent, with former Orient teammate James Dayton describing him 'He's left-footed, has a lovely touch and he's very aware of space. He is very natural at taking the ball into space and away from pressure'.

== Career statistics ==
As of match played 3 November 2026

Appearances and goals by club, season and competition
| Club | Season | League | | | National cup (Note: Includes FA Cup, Scottish Cup) | | League cup (Note: Includes EFL Cup, Scottish League Cup) | | Other | | Total | |
| Club | Season | Division | Apps | Goals | Apps | Goals | Apps | Goals | Apps | Goals | Apps | Goals |
|---|---|---|---|---|---|---|---|---|---|---|---|---|
| Leyton Orient | 2016–17 | League Two | 16 | 1 | 0 | 0 | 0 | 0 | 1 (Note: Appearance(s) in EFL Trophy) | 0 | 17 | 1 |
| Leyton Orient | 2017–18 | National League | 2 | 0 | 0 | 0 | — | | 0 | 0 | 2 | 0 |
| Leyton Orient | Total | | 18 | 1 | 0 | 0 | 0 | 0 | 1 | 0 | 19 | 1 |
| Leeds United | 2017–18 | Championship | 0 | 0 | — | | — | | — | | 0 | 0 |
| Leeds United | 2018–19 | Championship | 0 | 0 | 0 | 0 | 0 | 0 | — | | 0 | 0 |
| Leeds United | Total | | 0 | 0 | 0 | 0 | 0 | 0 | — | | 0 | 0 |
| Morecambe (loan) | 2018–19 | League Two | 2 | 0 | — | | — | | — | | 2 | 0 |
| Watford | 2019–20 | Premier League | 0 | 0 | 1 | 0 | 0 | 0 | — | | 1 | 0 |
| Watford | 2020–21 | Championship | 0 | 0 | 0 | 0 | 0 | 0 | — | | 0 | 0 |
| Watford | Total | | 0 | 0 | 1 | 0 | 0 | 0 | — | | 1 | 0 |
| Stockport County (loan) | 2020–21 | National League | 4 | 0 | — | | — | | — | | 4 | 0 |
| Woking (loan) | 2020–21 | National League | 14 | 1 | — | | — | | 1 (Note: Appearance(s) in FA Trophy) | 0 | 15 | 1 |
| Southend United | 2021–22 | National League | 43 | 9 | 2 | 0 | — | | 2 | 1 | 47 | 10 |
| Wrexham | 2022–23 | National League | 41 | 6 | 6 | 2 | — | | 2 | 0 | 49 | 8 |
| Wrexham | 2023–24 | League Two | 31 | 1 | 4 | 2 | 2 | 0 | 3 | 2 | 40 | 5 |
| Wrexham | 2024–25 | League One | 1 | 0 | 0 | 0 | 1 | 0 | 0 | 0 | 2 | 0 |
| Wrexham | Total | | 73 | 7 | 10 | 4 | 3 | 0 | 5 | 2 | 91 | 13 |
| Dundee United (loan) | 2024–25 | Scottish Premiership | 35 | 15 | 1 | 0 | 1 | 0 | — | | 37 | 15 |
| Bolton Wanderers | 2025–26 | League One | 41 | 11 (Note: Bolton's second goal against Plymouth Argyle on 3 April 2026, originally attributed to as own goal and still listed as such by most sources, was later credited to Dalby by the Dubious Goals Committee.) | 2 | 0 | 0 | 0 | 8 (Note: Five appearances and two goals in the EFL Trophy and three appearances and one goal in the League One play-offs) | 3 | 51 | 14 |
| Bolton Wanderers | 2026–27 | Championship | 14 | 6 | 0 | 0 | 1 | 0 | 0 | 0 | 15 | 6 |
| Bolton Wanderers | Total | | 55 | 17 | 2 | 0 | 1 | 0 | 8 | 3 | 66 | 20 |
| Career total | | | 244 | 48 | 16 | 4 | 5 | 0 | 17 | 6 | 282 | 58 |

== Honours ==
Wrexham

- National League: 2022–23
- EFL League Two runner-up: 2023–24

Bolton Wanderers

- EFL League One play-offs: 2026
