= Sam Inwood =

Northern Irish-English footballer (born 2005)

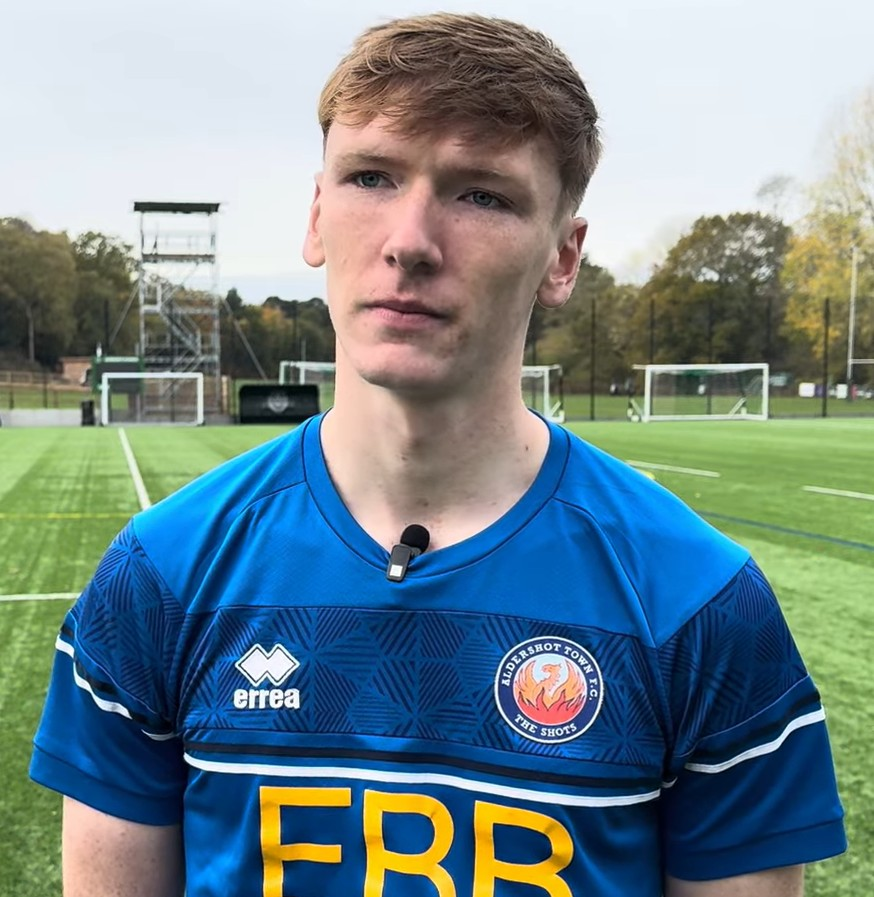
- Inwood in October 2025

Personal information
- Full name: Samuel Lawrence Inwood
- Date of birth: 17 September 2005 (age 21)
- Place of birth: Salford, England
- Height: 1.86 m (6 ft 1 in)
- Position: Defender

Team information
- Current team: Swindon Town (on loan from Bolton Wanderers)
- Number: 16

Youth career
- –2023: Bolton Wanderers

Senior career*
Years	Team	Apps	(Gls)
2023–	Bolton Wanderers	2	(0)
2025–2026	→ Aldershot Town (loan)	21	(0)
2026–	→ Swindon Town (loan)	1	(0)

International career^{‡}
2025–	Northern Ireland U21	4	(0)
- * Club domestic league appearances and goals as of 09:32, 31 July 2026 (UTC) ‡ National team caps and goals as of 09:32, 31 July 2026 (UTC)

Samuel Lawrence Inwood (born 17 September 2005) is a professional footballer who plays as a defender for EFL League Two side Swindon Town on loan from EFL Championship club Bolton Wanderers. Born in England, he plays for the Northern Ireland U21 team.

== Club career ==
=== Bolton Wanderers ===
Inwood began his professional career with Bolton Wanderers, signing his first professional contract in April 2023. He made his first-team debut on 26 September 2023, featuring in an 8–1 win over Manchester United U21s in the EFL Trophy. In the following season, Inwood made his league debut, completing the full match in a 1–1 draw against Peterborough United. On 9 September 2025, he signed a new three-year deal with the club running until June 2028.

On 30 October 2025, Inwood joined National League club, Aldershot Town on loan for the remainder of the 2025–26 campaign.

On 3 August 2026, Bolton sent Inwood out on loan again, this time to EFL League Two side Swindon Town for the 2026-27 season.

== International career ==
Eligible to play for England, Northern Ireland, and the Republic of Ireland, Inwood has represented Northern Ireland at under-21 level, appearing in their 1–1 draw with Moldova U21.

== Career statistics ==
As of match played 1 November 2025

Appearances and goals by club, season and competition
Club	Season	League			FA Cup		EFL Cup		Other		Total	
Club	Season	Division	Apps	Goals	Apps	Goals	Apps	Goals	Apps	Goals	Apps	Goals
Bolton Wanderers	2023–24	League One	0	0	0	0	0	0	1 (Note: Appearance in the EFL Trophy)	0	1	0
Bolton Wanderers	2024–25	League One	2	0	0	0	0	0	1	0	3	0
Bolton Wanderers	2025–26	League One	0	0	0	0	1	0	0	0	1	0
Bolton Wanderers	Total		2	0	0	0	1	0	2	0	5	0
Aldershot Town (loan)	2025–26	National League	0	0	1	0	—		0	0	1	0
Career total			2	0	1	0	1	0	2	0	6	0
