= Teddy Sharman-Lowe =

English footballer (born 2003)

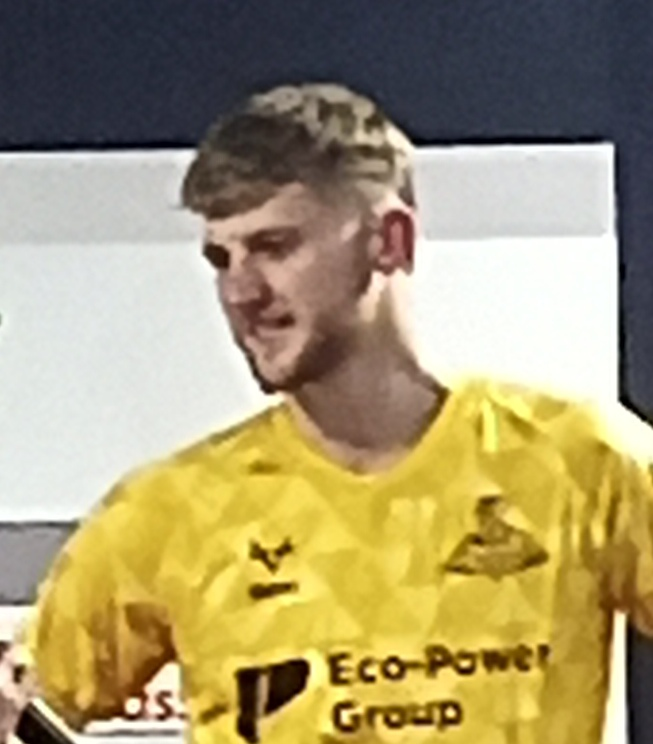
- Sharman-Lowe in 2025

Personal information
- Full name: Teddy Samuel Sharman-Lowe
- Date of birth: 30 March 2003 (age 23)
- Place of birth: Leicester, England
- Height: 6 ft 2 in (1.89 m)
- Position: Goalkeeper

Team information
- Current team: Chelsea
- Number: 28

Youth career
- –2017: Leicester City
- 2017–2020: Burton Albion

Senior career*
Years	Team	Apps	(Gls)
2020–	Chelsea	0	(0)
2020–2021	→ Burton Albion (loan)	0	(0)
2023	→ Havant & Waterlooville (loan)	21	(0)
2023–2024	→ Bromley (loan)	1	(0)
2024–2025	→ Doncaster Rovers (loan)	46	(0)
2025–2026	→ Bolton Wanderers (loan)	22	(0)

International career^{‡}
2020	England U17	2	(0)
2021–2022	England U19	3	(0)
2023	England U20	1	(0)
2025	England U21	1	(0)
Medal record
Men's football
Representing England
UEFA European Under-21 Championship
Winner	2025 Slovakia
UEFA European Under-19 Championship
Winner	2022 Slovakia
- * Club domestic league appearances and goals as of 16:06, 14 January 2026 (UTC) ‡ National team caps and goals as of 11:01, 10 April 2025 (UTC)

Teddy Samuel Sharman-Lowe (born 30 March 2003) is an English professional footballer who plays as a goalkeeper for Premier League club Chelsea.

== Club career ==
=== Early career ===
Sharman-Lowe was released by Leicester City as a schoolboy prior to joining Burton Albion's youth academy in 2017.

=== Chelsea ===
In September 2020, it was confirmed that he had signed for Chelsea and would remain on loan with Burton for the entirety of the 2020–21 season. On 8 September 2020 he made his first-team debut in an EFL Trophy group match against Peterborough United, and later that month played against Aston Villa in the EFL Cup. On 4 January 2021, Sharman-Lowe was recalled from his loan spell by his parent club, Chelsea.

==== Loans to non-league clubs ====
On 13 January 2023, Sharman-Lowe joined Havant & Waterlooville on loan for the remainder of the National League South season. On 10 July 2023, Sharman-Lowe agreed to join National League side Bromley on a season-long loan, but was recalled to Chelsea on 22 January 2024.

==== Loan to Doncaster Rovers ====
On 24 May 2024, Sharman-Lowe signed a new one-year deal with Chelsea, with an option for a further season. He was later sent on loan to League Two club Doncaster Rovers for the 2024–25 season.

On 12 January 2025, Sharman-Lowe helped Doncaster to a memorable third-round victory over Hull City at the MKM Stadium. After a 1–1 draw in normal and extra time, he played a significant role in the ensuing penalty shootout, making a crucial save that contributed to Doncaster’s progression to the next round.

On 26 April 2025, Sharman-Lowe saved a late penalty from Tyreik Wright in a 2–1 win over Bradford City that confirmed Doncaster’s promotion to League One with one game remaining. He played every league minute as Doncaster finished the season as champions of EFL League Two, securing promotion to EFL League One. His performance was praised as a key contribution to the club’s return to the third tier.

==== Loan to Bolton Wanderers ====
On 20 June 2025, Sharman-Lowe signed a two-year contract with Chelsea and joined League One side Bolton Wanderers on a season-long loan deal. On 14 January 2026, Sharman-Lowe was recalled by Chelsea.

== International career ==
In February 2020, Sharman-Lowe was selected by the England U-17 team and made two appearances at that level.

On 2 September 2021, Sharman-Lowe made his debut for the England U-19s during a 2–0 victory over Italy at St. George's Park.

On 17 June 2022, Sharman-Lowe was included in the England U-19 squad for the 2022 UEFA European Under-19 Championship. England won the tournament with a 3–1 extra time victory over Israel on 1 July 2022.

On 10 May 2023, Sharman-Lowe was included in the England squad for the 2023 FIFA U-20 World Cup. He made his U20 debut during the 0–0 draw with Iraq on 28 May 2023.

On 24 March 2025, Sharman-Lowe made his England U21 debut as a half-time substitute for James Beadle at The Hawthorns during a 4–2 win against Portugal.

== Career statistics ==
As of 13 January 2026

Appearances and goals by club, season and competition
Club	Season	League			FA Cup		EFL Cup		Europe		Other		Total	
Club	Season	Division	Apps	Goals	Apps	Goals	Apps	Goals	Apps	Goals	Apps	Goals	Apps	Goals
Chelsea	2020–21	Premier League	0	0	0	0	—		0	0	—		0	0
Chelsea	2021–22	Premier League	0	0	0	0	0	0	0	0	0	0	0	0
Chelsea	2022–23	Premier League	0	0	0	0	0	0	0	0	—		0	0
Chelsea	2023–24	Premier League	0	0	0	0	0	0	—		—		0	0
Chelsea	2025–26	Premier League	0	0	0	0	0	0	0	0	—		0	0
Chelsea	2026–27	Premier League	0	0	0	0	0	0	—		—		0	0
Chelsea	Total		0	0	0	0	0	0	0	0	0	0	0	0
Burton Albion (loan)	2020–21	League One	0	0	0	0	1	0	—		2 (Note: Appearance(s) in the EFL Trophy)	0	3	0
Chelsea U23	2021–22	—			—		—		—		2	0	2	0
Chelsea U23	2022–23	—			—		—		—		1	0	1	0
Havant & Waterlooville (loan)	2022–23	National League South	21	0	—		—		—		—		21	0
Bromley (loan)	2023–24	National League	1	0	0	0	—		—		2	0	3	0
Doncaster Rovers (loan)	2024–25	League Two	46	0	4	0	1	0	—		0	0	51	0
Bolton Wanderers (loan)	2025–26	EFL League One	22	0	0	0	0	0	—		1	0	23	0
Career total			90	0	4	0	2	0	0	0	8	0	104	0

== Honours ==
England U19

- UEFA European Under-19 Championship: 2022

England U21

- UEFA European Under-21 Championship: 2025

Doncaster Rovers

- EFL League Two: 2024–25
