= Jack Bonham =

Irish-English footballer (born 1993)

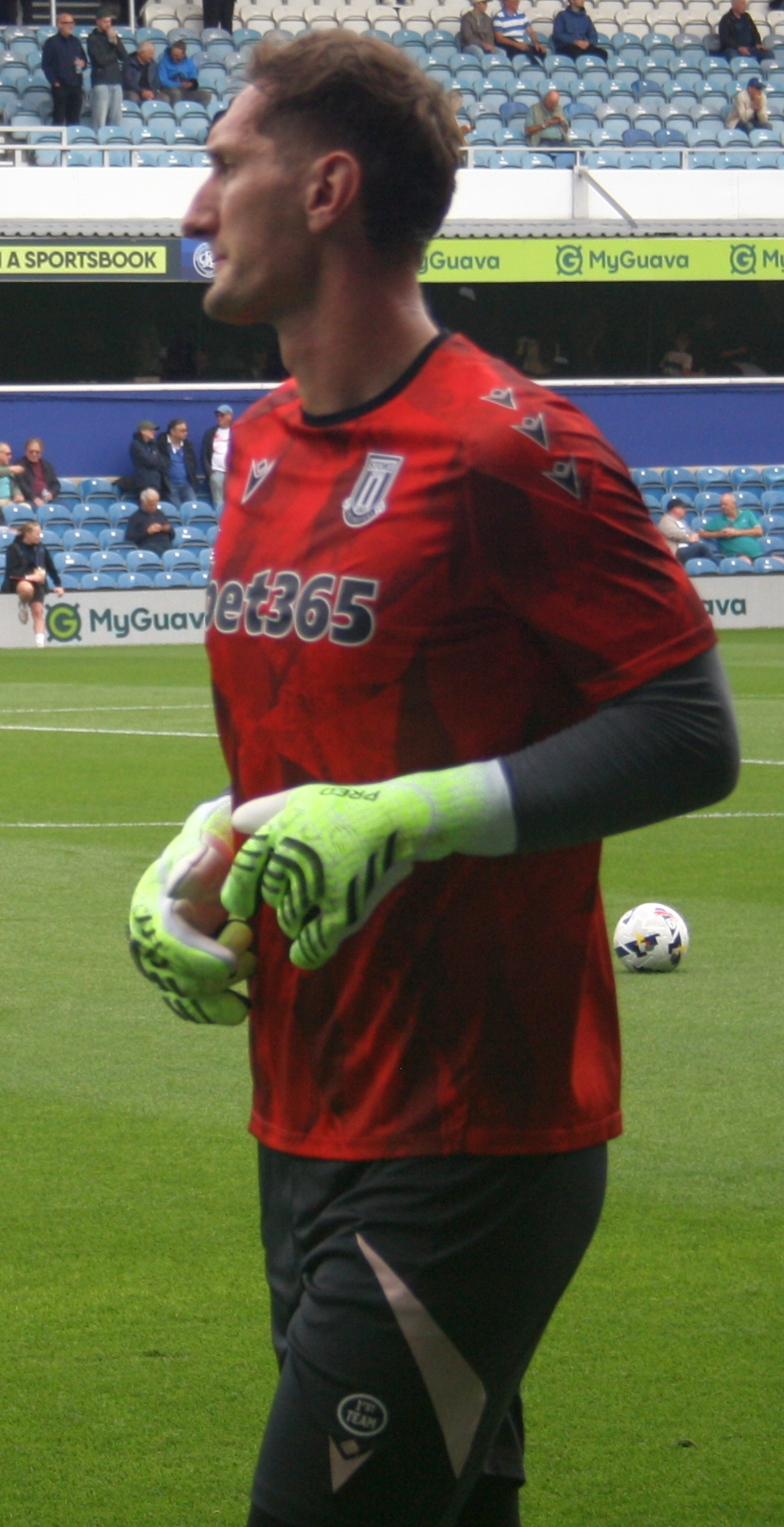
- Bonham while with Stoke City in 2025.

Personal information
- Full name: Jack Elliott Bonham
- Date of birth: 14 September 1993 (age 33)
- Place of birth: Stevenage, England
- Height: 1.92 m (6 ft 4 in)
- Position: Goalkeeper

Team information
- Current team: Bolton Wanderers
- Number: 1

Youth career
- –2010: Watford

Senior career*
Years	Team	Apps	(Gls)
2010–2013	Watford	1	(0)
2012	→ Harrow Borough (loan)	9	(0)
2013–2019	Brentford	2	(0)
2013–2014	→ Arlesey Town (loan)	15	(0)
2017–2018	→ Carlisle United (loan)	42	(0)
2018–2019	→ Bristol Rovers (loan)	40	(0)
2019–2021	Gillingham	79	(0)
2021–2026	Stoke City	52	(0)
2026–	Bolton Wanderers	23	(0)

International career
2009–2010	Republic of Ireland U17	5	(0)
- * Club domestic league appearances and goals as of 11:39, 26 August 2026 (UTC)

Jack Elliott Bonham (born 14 September 1993) is a professional footballer who plays as a goalkeeper for EFL Championship club Bolton Wanderers.

A product of the Watford academy, Bonham spent time on loan at non-League club Harrow Borough, before transferring to Brentford in June 2013. After failing to break into the team, he spent much of his later career with the club away on loan, before transferring to Gillingham in 2019. Following two seasons as the Gills' first-choice goalkeeper, he transferred to Stoke City in 2021. After slipping out of the first team picture by 2024, Bonham transferred to Bolton Wanderers in 2026. Although born in England, Bonham represented the Republic of Ireland at U17 level.

== Club career ==
=== Watford ===
==== 2010–2012 ====
Bonham signed a scholarship deal with Watford in June 2010, but quickly signed his first professional contract three months later, having just turned 17. Due to first team goalkeeper Scott Loach incurring a suspension, Bonham won his maiden call up to the first team squad on 26 November 2011, when he was an unused substitute during a 0–0 Championship draw with Doncaster Rovers. Bonham was an unused substitute on 12 occasions during the 2012–13 season.

On 17 February 2012, Bonham joined Isthmian League Premier Division club Harrow Borough on a one-month emergency loan. He made the first senior appearance of his career the following day, conceding two goals in a 2–2 draw with Bury Town. On 14 March, the loan was extended by a further month. He returned to Watford in April after he broke a bone in his hand during a 4–3 defeat to Canvey Island. He made 9 appearances for the club and failed to keep a clean sheet.

==== 2012–13 season ====
Bonham made his only appearance for Watford on 4 May 2013, when he came on as a substitute for injured goalkeeper Jonathan Bond after 24 minutes of the final game of the season against Leeds United. He was only included in the squad due to an injury sustained in the warm up by first-choice goalkeeper Manuel Almunia and was at fault for both Leeds' goals in the 2–1 defeat, which cost Watford the chance of automatic promotion to the Premier League. After the match, Watford manager Gianfranco Zola refused to blame Bonham for his actions. Bonham was not called into the matchday squads during Watford's unsuccessful playoff campaign. On 7 June 2013, Watford announced that Bonham's contract would not be renewed and he was released by the club.

=== Brentford ===
==== 2013–14 season and loan to Arlesey Town ====
On 12 June 2013, Bonham signed a two-year contract with League One club Brentford on a free transfer. He made his debut for the club in a League Cup first round tie at home to Dagenham & Redbridge on 6 August, in which Brentford ran out 3–2 extra time winners. His second appearance came in the following round away to Derby County, in which he endured a torrid evening as the home side cruised to a 3–0 lead before half time, eventually winning 5–0. Bonham made his league debut on 7 September, coming off the bench against Bradford City after starting keeper David Button was sent off. Described as a 'nightmare afternoon' in press reports, he conceded four goals as Brentford lost 4–0.

Bonham spent much of the remainder of the 2013–14 season away on loan at Southern League Premier Division club Arlesey Town. Joining on 15 November 2013, he made his debut the following day in a 2–0 FA Trophy third qualifying round victory over Marlow. He endured another nightmare afternoon in the following round, conceding five goals in a 5–1 defeat to Whitehawk on 30 November. After four successive defeats and conceding 12 goals, Bonham helped Arlesey to three consecutive league wins in December. At the end of the month, his loan was extended until the end of the 2013–14 season. Bonham was recalled on 8 February 2014, after making 19 appearances.

==== 2014–15 season ====
Following Brentford's promotion to the Championship, a persistent shoulder injury suffered by Richard Lee saw Bonham serve as backup to David Button through the 2014–15 season. He signed a new 3 1/2 year contract on 2 January 2015 and celebrated his signing the following day with his only appearance of the season with a start in an FA Cup third round match versus Brighton & Hove Albion. He conceded two late goals as Brentford were knocked out after suffering a 2–0 defeat, though winning the club's social media man of the match award proved to be a consolation.

==== 2015–2017 ====
Bonham had a nightmare start to the 2015–16 season, conceding four goals on his sole appearance against Oxford United in the League Cup first round on 11 August 2015. He again served as David Button's backup throughout the campaign. Despite the departure of Button on 19 July 2016, Bonham entered the 2016–17 season as second-choice behind new signing Dan Bentley. He made his first appearance of the season in a 1–0 EFL Cup first round defeat to Exeter City on 9 August 2016. Having failed to make an appearance in nearly five months, Bonham revealed in late December 2016 that it was "frustrating" to be denied the chance to move away on loan. He made his second and final appearance of the season with his first Brentford start in a 1–1 draw versus Barnsley on 17 April 2017 and won the club's man of the match award for his performance.

==== 2017–18 season and loan to Carlisle United ====
Bonham signed a one-year contract extension in June 2017, which would keep him at Griffin Park until the end of the 2018–19 season. He spent the entire 2017–18 season away on loan at League Two club Carlisle United. Bonham's performances in January 2018 saw him nominated for the PFA League Two Fans' Player of the Month award and he finished the season with 49 appearances.

==== 2018–19 season and loan to Bristol Rovers ====
On 27 August 2018, Bonham joined League One club Bristol Rovers on loan until the end of the 2018–19 season. He had an impressive start to his time with the club and was reported on 15 October 2018 to have "the best save percentage of any first-choice goalkeeper in England so far this season, with 91.5%". Bonham finished the season with 46 appearances. Bonham departed Brentford when his contract expired at the end of the 2018–19 season, after making just seven appearances during six seasons at Griffin Park.

=== Gillingham ===
On 4 June 2019, Bonham signed a two-year contract with League One club Gillingham on a free transfer, effective 1 July 2019. He made 89 appearances during two mid-table seasons with the club and departed Priestfield after rejecting a new contract at the end of the 2020–21 season.

=== Stoke City ===
On 28 June 2021, Bonham signed a two-year contract with Championship club Stoke City. He failed to win a call into a matchday squad until 20 November 2021, when he was promoted to the substitutes' bench due to first-choice goalkeeper Josef Bursik suffering a torn thigh muscle. Bonham backed up second-choice goalkeeper Adam Davies until January 2022, when he assumed the starting role. After Davies' transfer away from the club in January 2022 and Bursik's return from injury one month later, Bonham largely held the starting spot through to the end of the 2021–22 season and finished the campaign with 17 appearances.

Bonham improved his tally to 28 appearances during the 2022–23 season and the one-year option to extend his contract was exercised at the end of the campaign. Bonham signed another one-year contract extension in November 2023. Behind successive loan signings Mark Travers and Daniel Iversen in the pecking order, Bonham made 16 appearances during a mid-table 2023–24 season. Despite the presence of Viktor Johansson restricting Bonham to just two cup appearances during the 2024–25 season, he signed a further one-year contract extension in May 2025.

On his first appearance of the 2025–26 season, Bonham scored the penalty that decided an EFL Cup first round shootout versus Walsall on 12 August 2025. He made one further EFL Cup appearance before transferring out of the club on 14 January 2026. During 4 1/2 years with Stoke City, Bonham made 64 appearances.

=== Bolton Wanderers ===
On 14 January 2026, Bonham transferred to League One club Bolton Wanderers and signed an 18-month contract, for an undisclosed fee. He made 24 appearances during the remainder of the 2025–26 season and was the starting goalkeeper in the 2026 League One playoff final victory, which secured promotion to the Championship. On 22 August, Bonham made ten saves in a 0–0 away draw against Queens Park Rangers. This earned him a spot in the EFL Team of the Week. He 18 September, he signed a new two-year contract.

== International career ==
Bonham won five caps for the Republic of Ireland U17 team in 2009 and 2010. In October 2018, it was reported that the full Republic of Ireland team were considering calling up Bonham, due to his club form for Bristol Rovers.

== Career statistics ==
As of match played 22 August 2026

Appearances and goals by club, season and competition
Club	Season	League			FA Cup		League Cup		Other		Total	
Club	Season	Division	Apps	Goals	Apps	Goals	Apps	Goals	Apps	Goals	Apps	Goals
Watford	2011–12	Championship	0	0	0	0	0	0	—		0	0
Watford	2012–13	Championship	1	0	0	0	0	0	0	0	1	0
Watford	Total		1	0	0	0	0	0	0	0	1	0
Harrow Borough (loan)	2011–12	Isthmian League Premier Division	9	0	—		—		—		9	0
Brentford	2013–14	League One	1	0	0	0	2	0	0	0	3	0
Brentford	2014–15	Championship	0	0	1	0	0	0	0	0	1	0
Brentford	2015–16	Championship	0	0	0	0	1	0	—		1	0
Brentford	2016–17	Championship	1	0	0	0	1	0	—		2	0
Brentford	2017–18	Championship	0	0	0	0	0	0	—		0	0
Brentford	2018–19	Championship	0	0	0	0	0	0	—		0	0
Brentford	Total		2	0	1	0	4	0	0	0	7	0
Arlesey Town (loan)	2013–14	Southern League Premier Division	15	0	—		—		4 (Note: 2 appearances in FA Trophy, 1 appearance in Southern League Cup, 1 appearance in Bedfordshire Senior Cup)	0	19	0
Carlisle United (loan)	2017–18	League Two	42	0	5	0	2	0	0	0	49	0
Bristol Rovers (loan)	2018–19	League One	40	0	0	0	0	0	6 (Note: Appearance(s) in EFL Trophy)	0	46	0
Gillingham	2019–20	League One	35	0	4	0	1	0	0	0	40	0
Gillingham	2020–21	League One	44	0	2	0	2	0	1	0	49	0
Gillingham	Total		79	0	6	0	3	0	1	0	89	0
Stoke City	2021–22	Championship	15	0	2	0	0	0	—		17	0
Stoke City	2022–23	Championship	23	0	3	0	1	0	—		27	0
Stoke City	2023–24	Championship	14	0	0	0	2	0	—		16	0
Stoke City	2024–25	Championship	0	0	1	0	1	0	—		2	0
Stoke City	2025–26	Championship	0	0	0	0	2	0	—		2	0
Stoke City	Total		52	0	6	0	6	0	—		64	0
Bolton Wanderers	2025–26	League One	21	0	—		—		3 (Note: Appearances in League One play-offs)	0	24	0
Bolton Wanderers	2026–27	Championship	2	0	0	0	1	0	—		3	0
Bolton Wanderers	Total		23	0	0	0	1	0	3	0	27	0
Career total			263	0	18	0	16	0	14	0	311	0

== Honours ==
Bolton Wanderers

- EFL League One play-offs: 2026
