= Chris Forino-Joseph =

Saint Lucian footballer (born 2000)

- Forino-Joseph playing for Bolton Wanderers in August 2026

Personal information
- Full name: Christian Kai John Forino-Joseph
- Date of birth: 26 April 2000 (age 26)
- Place of birth: Islington, England
- Height: 1.91 m (6 ft 3 in)
- Position: Defender

Team information
- Current team: Bolton Wanderers
- Number: 3

Youth career
- Soccer Chance Academy
- 2010–2016: Brentford
- –2018: Cheshunt
- 2018–2019: Colchester United

Senior career*
Years	Team	Apps	(Gls)
2019–2020	Wingate & Finchley	16	(1)
2020	Loughborough University	6	(0)
2021–2024	Wycombe Wanderers	75	(5)
2024–	Bolton Wanderers	54	(3)

International career^{‡}
2024–	Saint Lucia	2	(1)
- * Club domestic league appearances and goals as of 09:15, 22 November 2026 (UTC) ‡ National team caps and goals as of 10:00, 10 September 2024 (UTC)

Christian Kai John Forino-Joseph (born 26 April 2000) is a professional footballer who plays as a defender for EFL Championship club Bolton Wanderers. Born in England, he plays for the Saint Lucia national football team.

He is a product of the Brentford Academy and played his first senior football with non-League clubs Wingate & Finchley and Loughborough University.

== Club career ==
=== Early years ===
A defender, Forino-Joseph began his youth career with spells in the Soccer Chance Academy, the Brentford Academy and Cheshunt U18. After a break from football to focus on education, he signed his first professional contract with the U23 team at League Two club Colchester United in July 2018. Forino-Joseph was released when his one-year contract expired and joined Isthmian League Premier Division club Wingate & Finchley in September 2019. He made 20 appearances and scored one goal during the COVID-19-affected 2019–20 season. Forino-Joseph had a spell at United Counties League Premier Division club Loughborough University during the first half of the 2020–21 season, which was again abandoned early due to COVID-19.

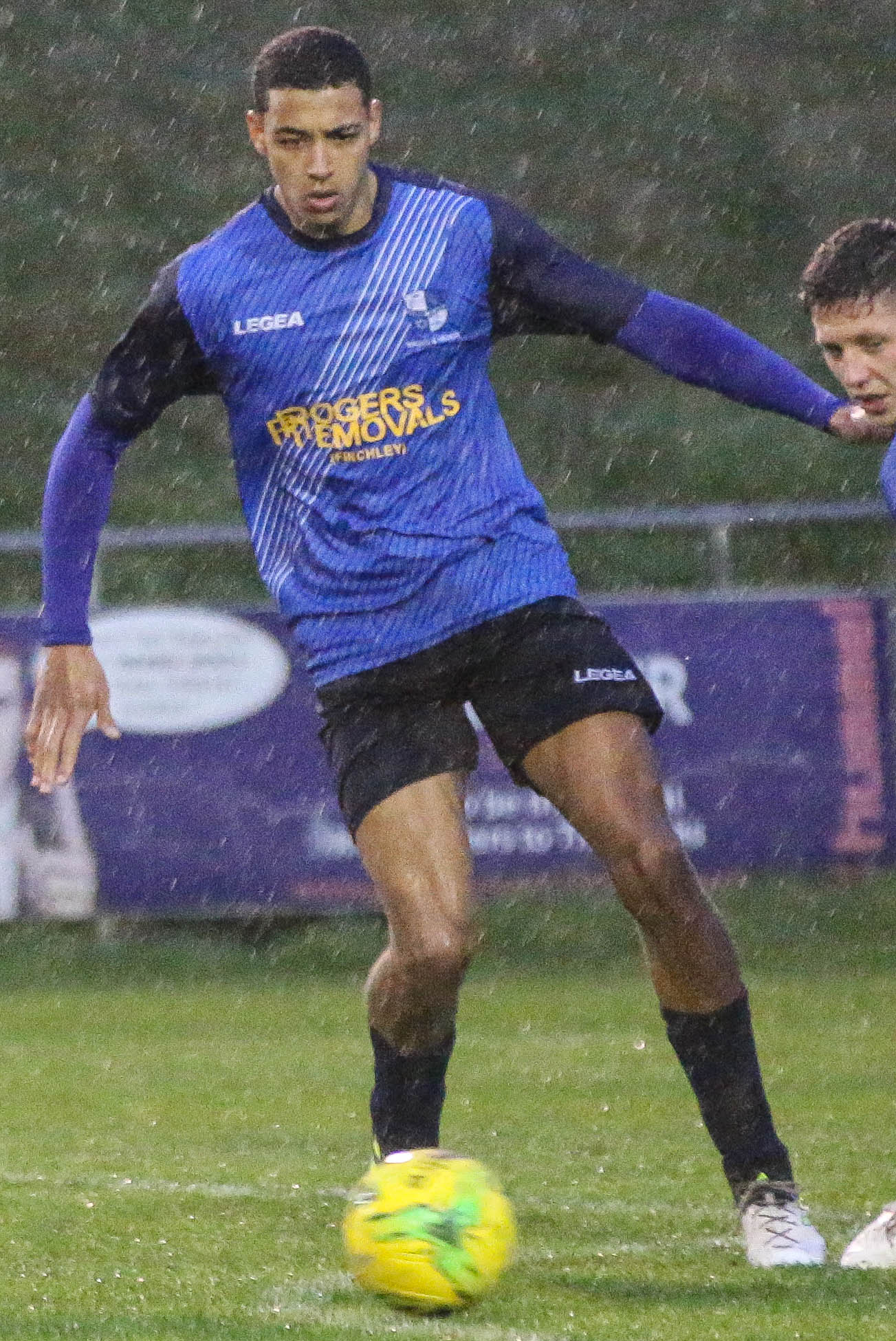
Forino-Joseph playing for Wingate & Finchley in November 2019

=== Wycombe Wanderers ===
After a trial period, Forino-Joseph signed a one-year contract with Championship club Wycombe Wanderers on 27 April 2021. Following the club's relegation to League One shortly after he arrived at Adams Park, he had a long spell out injured and undertook a lengthy course of conditioning with the club's Development Squad physiotherapist. Forino-Joseph made his senior debut with a start in a 3–1 EFL Trophy group stage defeat to Aston Villa U21 on 31 August 2021. His second appearance came with a start in a FA Cup first round match versus Hartlepool United on 6 November and he scored the first senior goal for the club in the 2–2 draw.

In April 2024, Forino was allegedly racially abused by Blackpool fans.

He was offered a new contract by Wycombe at the end of the 2023–24 season.

=== Bolton Wanderers ===
On 14 June 2024, it was announced that Forino-Joseph would join EFL League One side Bolton Wanderers on a free transfer, signing a three-year contract set to be activated on 1 July 2024.

In September 2024 he suffered a hamstring injury. He underwent surgery in October, and was expected to be out for 3 to 4 months.

On 1 April 2025, he scored his first goal for Bolton in their local derby with Wigan Athletic at the Brick Community Stadium. The goal in the latter stages of the game handed Wanderers a 1-0 victory and was their first win over Wigan in ten years. Forino-Joseph later dedicated his goal to the Bolton fans.

== International career ==
Forino-Joseph was eligible for England, Italy and Saint Lucia, and in December 2022, pledged his international allegiance to Saint Lucia. He received his first call-up to the Saint Lucia national team in November 2023.

He made his debut two years later, on 6 September 2024, in the CONCACAF Nations League match against Curaçao, which ended in a 2–1 victory.

Three days later, he scored his first goal in the match against Grenada, which ended in a 1–2 defeat.

== Personal life ==
In 2021, Forino-Joseph gave up a place at university in order to become a professional footballer. He is of Saint Lucian and Italian descent.

== Career statistics ==
=== Club ===
As of match played 21 November 2026

Appearances and goals by club, season and competition
Club	Season	League			FA Cup		EFL Cup		Other		Total	
Club	Season	Division	Apps	Goals	Apps	Goals	Apps	Goals	Apps	Goals	Apps	Goals
Wingate & Finchley	2019–20	Isthmian League Premier Division	16	1	0	0	―		4 (Note: 2 appearances in the FA Trophy and 2 appearances in the Middlesex Senior Cup.)	0	20	1
Loughborough University	2020–21	United Counties League Premier Division	6	0	1	0	―		3 (Note: Appearances in the FA Vase.)	1	9	1
Wycombe Wanderers	2021–22	League One	15	1	1	1	0	0	2 (Note: Appearance(s) in the EFL Trophy.)	0	18	2
Wycombe Wanderers	2022–23	League One	30	4	0	0	2	0	2	0	34	4
Wycombe Wanderers	2023–24	League One	30	0	1	0	2	1	5	1	38	2
Wycombe Wanderers	Total		75	5	2	1	4	1	9	1	90	8
Bolton Wanderers	2024–25	League One	16	2	0	0	3	0	0	0	19	2
Bolton Wanderers	2025–26	League One	28	1	1	0	1	0	6 (Note: Three appearances in the EFL Trophy, three appearances in the play-offs)	0	36	1
Bolton Wanderers	2026–27	Championship	10	0	0	0	1	0	0	0	11	0
Bolton Wanderers	Total		54	3	1	0	5	0	6	0	66	3
Career total			151	9	4	1	9	1	22	1	185	13

=== International ===
As of match played 9 September 2024

Appearances and goals by national team and year
National team	Year	Apps	Goals
Saint Lucia	2024	2	1
Total		2	1

Scores and results list Saint Lucia's goal tally first, score column indicates score after each Forino-Joseph goal.

List of international goals scored by Chris Forino-Joseph
No.	Date	Venue	Opponent	Score	Result	Competition	Ref.
1	9 September 2024	Kirani James Athletic Stadium, St. George's, Grenada	Grenada	1–0	2–1	2024–25 CONCACAF Nations League B	

== Honours ==
Wycombe Wanderers

- EFL Trophy runner-up: 2023–24

Bolton Wanderers

- EFL League One play-offs: 2026
