= Amario Cozier-Duberry =

English footballer (born 2005)

Personal information
- Full name: Amario Oswald Gerardo Cozier-Duberry
- Date of birth: 29 May 2005 (age 21)
- Place of birth: Islington, England
- Height: 5 ft 7 in (1.70 m)
- Positions: Winger; attacking midfielder

Team information
- Current team: Middlesbrough (on loan from Brighton & Hove Albion)
- Number: 11

Youth career
- 2013–2019: Chettle Court Rangers
- 2019–2024: Arsenal
- 2024: Brighton & Hove Albion

Senior career*
Years	Team	Apps	(Gls)
2024–	Brighton & Hove Albion	0	(0)
2024–2025	→ Blackburn Rovers (loan)	22	(1)
2025–2026	→ Bolton Wanderers (loan)	34	(8)
2026–	→ Middlesbrough (loan)	11	(3)

International career^{‡}
2021	England U16	1	(1)
2021–2022	England U17	8	(2)
2022	England U18	3	(1)
2023	England U19	8	(3)
2024–2025	England U20	2	(0)
2026–	England U21	3	(0)
- * Club domestic league appearances and goals as of 21 November 2026 ‡ National team caps and goals as of 13 October 2026

Amario Oswald Gerardo Cozier-Duberry (born 29 May 2005) is an English professional footballer who plays as a winger or attacking midfielder for EFL Championship club Middlesbrough, on loan from Brighton & Hove Albion.

== Early life ==
Cozier-Duberry was born in London, England, growing up in Tottenham. He was passed up by numerous London clubs he went on trial, with him going on to join Chettle Court Rangers when he was eight, playing through the under-11s to under-15s. After Cozier-Duberry won a youth tournament with Chettle Court Rangers in Enfield, Arsenal offered him a 10-week trial which he accepted. After 10 weeks with the academy, he permanently joined Hale End at age fourteen in October 2019.

== Club career ==
=== Arsenal ===
Cozier-Duberry came off the bench in his EFL Trophy debut for the under-21s, donning the number 91 in a 2–1 away loss at Swindon Town in September 2021. Cozier-Duberry signed his first professional contract with the first team in early June 2022, taking the number 85. He scored his first EFL Trophy goal in a 3–1 victory at the Sixfields Stadium against Northampton in early October 2022. His home debut for the senior team came in a friendly against Juventus, when at the 63rd minute he was subbed on to replace Granit Xhaka.

Cozier-Duberry started in all six of Arsenal U18's games during the 2022–23 FA Youth Cup. He scored five goals and set up three goals during the campaign, culminating in a 5–1 loss to West Ham United in the final. He led Arsenal U21's goals and assists in the 2022–23 Premier League 2, with seven goals and five assists, with his strikes against both Newcastle United and Brighton nominated for Arsenal's goal of the month, in January and April respectively.

Cozier-Duberry was named in a preseason squad touring across the United States with matches with the MLS All-Stars, Manchester United, and Barcelona. He was subbed in versus the latter at the 85th minute mark, wearing number 45.

Cozier-Duberry left Arsenal on 30 June after turning down a new contract offer, having made a total of 4 friendly appearances for the first team in the five years he spent at Arsenal.

=== Brighton & Hove Albion ===
On 7 July 2024, Cozier-Duberry joined fellow Premier League club Brighton & Hove Albion on a free transfer, signing a four-year contract.

==== Blackburn Rovers (loan) ====
Cozier-Duberry joined EFL Championship club Blackburn Rovers on a season-long loan on 30 August 2024. He made his debut for Blackburn Rovers in a 3–0 win at Ewood Park versus Bristol City on 14 September, as a 90th minute substitution for Ryan Hedges. His first senior goal came during his first senior start two months later on 14 December, slotting the opening goal in a 2–0 victory over Luton Town. Cozier-Duberry received Blackburn Rovers' Player of the Match award at the end of this fixture. After the season had concluded, he had made 22 league appearances and scored once for Blackburn Rovers through the course of the season.

==== Bolton Wanderers (loan) ====
Cozier-Duberry joined League One club Bolton Wanderers on a season-long loan on 5 July 2025. He made his Bolton Wanderers debut on 3 August, starting for the club in a 2–0 loss versus Stockport County at Edgeley Park. His first goal for The Trotters was a last gasp left-footed curled strike versus Sheffield Wednesday in the EFL Cup, tying the game at 3–3 and sending the match to penalties. Bolton Wanderers went on to lose 4–2 on penalties. He was named both EFL League One Player of the Month and EFL Young Player of the Month for October, after bagging two assists and scoring two injury-time winners that month.

Having proved himself as one Bolton's best players, Cozier-Duberry sustained a knee ligament injury during Bolton's 2–1 home win over Leyton Orient on 24 January 2026, being replaced by Cyrus Christie in the 26th minute.

Cozier-Duberry would return to action over two months later, on 6 April 2026. Amario was brought on as a substitute in the 72nd minute of a 2–2 draw in a Greater Manchester derby against geographical and promotion rivals Stockport County.

The next day, Cozier-Duberry was named as a nominee for EFL League One Young Player of the Season.

Cozier-Duberry's first start after returning from injury came on 14 April 2026 in a home fixture against Stevenage, another team hoping to secure a place in the play-offs. Cozier-Duberry would score twice, playing a crucial role in Bolton winning 5–1, leading him to be awarded man of the match.

==== Middlesbrough (loan) ====
On 1 September 2026, Cozier-Duberry extended his contract with Brighton until 2029 and joined Middlesbrough on a season-long loan.

== International career ==
Born in England, Cozier-Duberry is of Montserratian and Barbadian descent. He made one appearance for the England under-16s against Wales U16s scoring once, in a 3–2 loss. Cozier-Duberry scored twice in four appearances for the England U17s, as they were qualifying for the U17 euros. Cozier-Duberry has scored once in three Costa Calida Supercup appearances for the England U18s. He was called up to play for the under-19s, where he played in three U19 Euros qualifiers, against Iceland, Hungary, and Turkey, netting once against the latter. He was called up by the England U19s once more in September in two friendlies versus Germany U19 and Switzerland U19, with Cozier-Duberry scoring against the latter.

On 21 March 2025, Cozier-Duberry made his England U20 debut in a 1–1 draw at Portugal in Leiria, followed up by an appearance in a 2–2 draw versus Switzerland in Marbella.

== Style of play ==
Growing up, Cozier-Duberry admired Arjen Robben, mainly because of his "wand of a left foot", and "unstoppable cut-inside move". He is touted to play like Bukayo Saka, a Hale End graduate, and Moussa Diaby, a prolific winger for Aston Villa.

Former Arsenal Under-18 coach Jack Wilshere said in 2023: "In some moments, he's (Cozier-Duberry) unplayable. You give him the ball, and he can make things happen."

== Career statistics ==
As of match played 21 November 2026

Club	Season	Division	League		FA Cup		League Cup		Europe		Other		Total	
Club	Season	Division	Apps	Goals	Apps	Goals	Apps	Goals	Apps	Goals	Apps	Goals	Apps	Goals
Arsenal U21	2021–22	—			—		—		—		1 (Note: Appearance(s) in EFL Trophy)	0	1	0
Arsenal U21	2022–23	—			—		—		—		2	2	2	2
Arsenal U21	2023–24	—			—		—		—		1	0	1	0
Arsenal U21	Total		—		—		—		—		4	2	4	2
Brighton & Hove Albion U21	2024–25	—			—		—		—		1	0	1	0
Brighton & Hove Albion	2024—25	Premier League	0	0	0	0	0	0	—		—		0	0
Brighton & Hove Albion	2025–26	Premier League	0	0	0	0	0	0	—		—		0	0
Brighton & Hove Albion	2026–27	Premier League	0	0	0	0	0	0	1 (Note: Appearance in UEFA Conference League)	0	—		1	0
Brighton & Hove Albion	Total		0	0	0	0	0	0	1	0	—		1	0
Blackburn Rovers (loan)	2024–25	Championship	22	1	1	0	—		—		—		23	1
Bolton Wanderers (loan)	2025–26	League One	34	8	2	0	1	1	—		4 (Note: One appearance in EFL Trophy, three appearances and one goal in EFL League One play-offs)	1	41	10
Middlesbrough (loan)	2026–27	Championship	11	3	0	0	1	0	—		—		12	3
Career total			67	12	3	0	2	1	1	0	9	3	82	16

== Honours ==
Arsenal U21

- FA Youth Cup runner-up: 2022–23

Bolton Wanderers

- EFL League One play-offs: 2026

Individual

- EFL Young Player of the Month: October 2025
- EFL League One Player of the Month: October 2025
- EFL League One Young Player of the Season: 2025–26 nominee
- EFL League One Team of the Season: 2025-26
- PFA Team of the Year: 2025–26 League One
