= Max Conway =

English footballer (born 2003)

Personal information
- Full name: Maxwell John Conway
- Date of birth: 5 September 2003 (age 23)
- Place of birth: Manchester, England
- Height: 6 ft 0 in (1.82 m)
- Position: Left-back

Team information
- Current team: Bolton Wanderers
- Number: 25

Youth career
- 2010–2022: Bolton Wanderers

Senior career*
Years	Team	Apps	(Gls)
2022–	Bolton Wanderers	44	(0)
2022–2023	→ Buxton (loan)	26	(1)
2023	→ Rochdale (loan)	7	(0)
2023–2024	→ AFC Fylde (loan)	27	(0)
2024–2025	→ Crewe Alexandra (loan)	46	(2)
- * Club domestic league appearances and goals as of 00:09, 1 September 2026 (UTC)

Maxwell "Max" John Conway (born 5 September 2003) is an English professional footballer who plays as a left-back for EFL Championship club Bolton Wanderers.

== Career ==
=== Bolton Wanderers ===
Conway came through the Bolton Wanderers academy, joining at age 7. He signed his first professional contract with Bolton Wanderers on 13 June 2022.

Prior to signing his deal, Conway had featured on the first team bench during the 2020–21 season and was amongst the substitutes for the EFL Trophy Group stage game against Shrewsbury Town in October 2020.

In May 2023, Bolton announced that Conway had signed a new one-year deal with the club. Exactly a year later, Bolton confirmed that they had activated an option to extend his contract with the club.

On 7 May 2025, Bolton took up another one-year option in Conway's contract which ties him down until the summer of 2026. On 20 October, he signed a new contract until 2029.

His first season as a playing member of the first team came during the 2025–26 season. He returned from his loans and became the first choice left-back, with Bolton winning promotion through the EFL League One play-offs.

==== National League loan spells ====
In November 2022, Conway joined National League North club Buxton on loan until January 2023, and the following February, he extended his loan deal with the club until the end of the season.

In August 2023, Conway was loaned out to newly relegated National League side, Rochdale, On 6 October after featuring just seven times for Dale, he was recalled by parent club, Bolton Wanderers.

A day later, Conway joined fellow National League club AFC Fylde on a 28-day loan deal; his loan was extended in November until 31 January 2024, and then until the end of the season.

==== Crewe Alexandra (loan) ====
On 9 August 2024, despite featuring heavily for Bolton's first team during pre-season, Conway joined League Two side Crewe Alexandra on a season-long loan. Conway made his senior debut in the EFL a day later, coming on as a substitute for Lewis Billington during Crewe's 1–0 defeat at Barrow on the opening day of the season. He scored his first senior goal (a "fine individual effort") in Crewe's 1–1 League draw at Doncaster Rovers on 12 October 2024. On 16 January 2025, Crewe confirmed that Conway would remain at the club until the end of the season. He played every league game for Crewe, and was voted Crewe's Player of the Year.

== Personal life ==
One of Conway's grandparents was born in Pretoria, South Africa.

== Career statistics ==
As of match played 29 August 2026

Appearances and goals by club, season and competition
Club	Season	League			FA Cup		League Cup		Other		Total	
Club	Season	Division	Apps	Goals	Apps	Goals	Apps	Goals	Apps	Goals	Apps	Goals
Bolton Wanderers	2025–26	League One	41	0	2	0	1	0	4 (Note: One Appearance in the EFL Trophy and three appearances and in the EFL League One play-offs)	0	48	0
Bolton Wanderers	2026–27	Championship	3	0	0	0	1	0	0	0	4	0
Bolton Wanderers	Total		44	0	2	0	2	0	4	0	52	0
Buxton (loan)	2022–23	National League North	26	1	1	0	—		—		27	1
Rochdale (loan)	2023–24	National League	7	0	—		—		—		7	0
AFC Fylde (loan)	2023–24	National League	27	0	2	0	0	0	2 (Note: Appearances in FA Trophy)	0	31	0
Crewe Alexandra (loan)	2024–25	League Two	46	2	1	0	1	0	2 (Note: Appearance(s) in EFL Trophy)	0	50	2
Career total			150	3	6	0	3	0	8	0	167	3

== Honours ==
Bolton Wanderers

- EFL League One play-offs: 2026

Individual

- Crewe Alexandra Player of the Year: 2024–25
