= George Johnston (footballer, born 1998) =

Scottish footballer (born 1998)

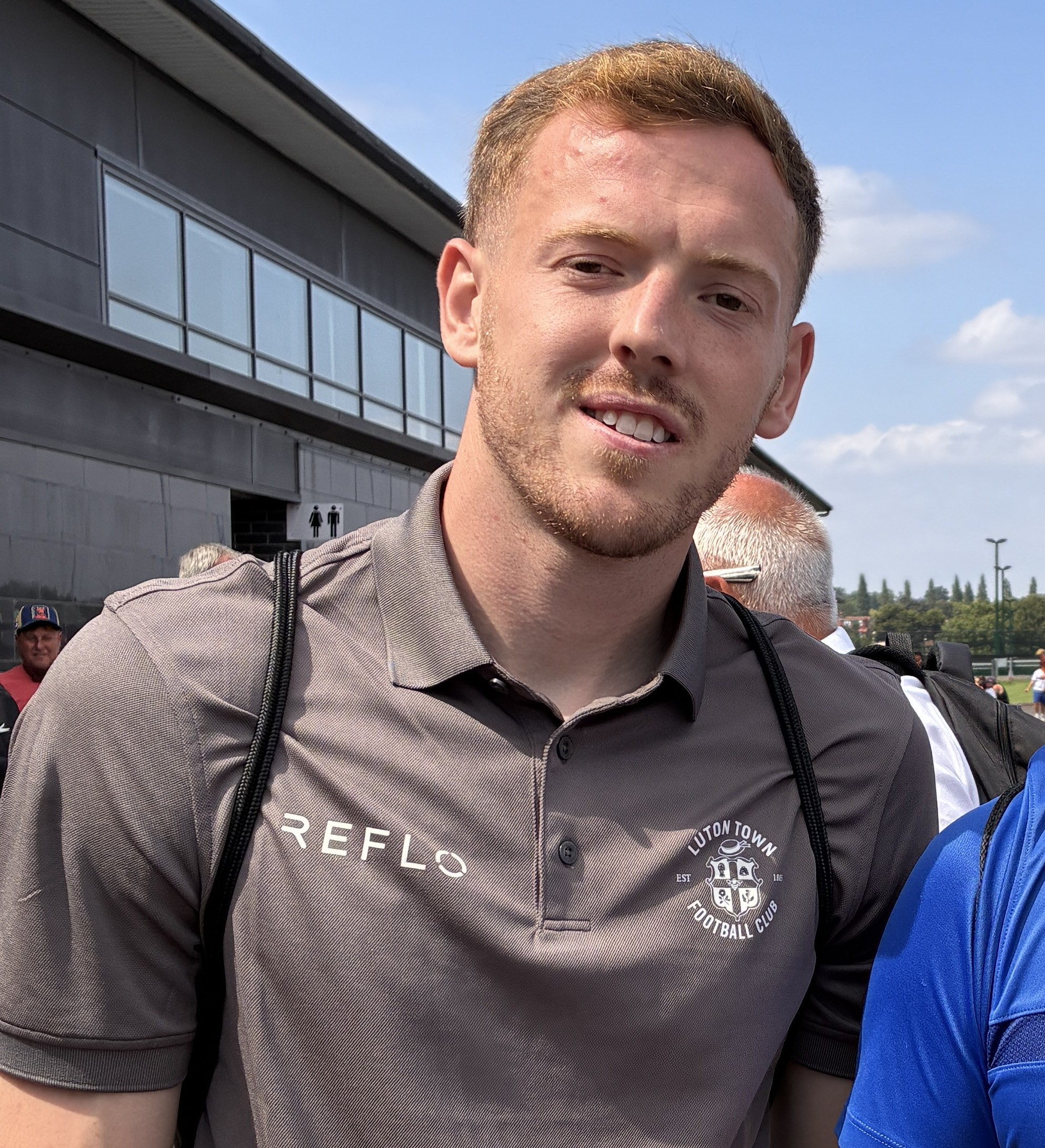
- Johnston in 2026 with Luton Town

Personal information
- Full name: George Thomas Johnston
- Date of birth: 1 September 1998 (age 28)
- Place of birth: Manchester, England
- Height: 5 ft 11 in (1.81 m)
- Position: Centre-back

Team information
- Current team: Luton Town
- Number: 6

Youth career
- 2008–2019: Liverpool

Senior career*
Years	Team	Apps	(Gls)
2019–2021	Feyenoord	4	(0)
2021	→ Wigan Athletic (loan)	22	(1)
2021–2026	Bolton Wanderers	160	(4)
2026–	Luton Town	15	(0)

International career^{‡}
2018	Scotland U20	1	(0)
2019–2020	Scotland U21	10	(0)
- * Club domestic league appearances and goals as of 18:51, 21 November 2026 (UTC) ‡ National team caps and goals as of 17:13, 20 November 2026 (UTC)

George Thomas Johnston (born 1 September 1998) is a professional footballer who plays as a centre-back for EFL League One club Luton Town. Born in England, Johnston has represented Scotland at youth international level.

== Career ==
=== Liverpool ===
Johnston came through the Liverpool academy, making one first-team appearance in a preseason friendly against Torino at Anfield in August 2018.

=== Feyenoord ===
In August 2019, he moved to Eredivisie club Feyenoord on a permanent deal. Feyenoord paid Liverpool £300,000, and the deal included a 30% sell-on clause.

=== Wigan Athletic (loan) ===
On 22 January 2021, Johnston joined League One side Wigan Athletic on loan for the remainder of the 2020–21 season. He scored his first goal for Wigan in a 3–0 win against Milton Keynes Dons on 6 March 2021.

=== Bolton Wanderers ===
On 4 June 2021, Johnston returned to League One, this time joining Bolton Wanderers on a three-year deal. He turned down a permanent contract at Wigan to join Bolton. His competitive debut came on 7 August in a 3–3 draw against Milton Keynes Dons, where he made a goal line clearance.

On 2 April 2023, he came on as a substitute in the 2023 EFL Trophy final against Plymouth Argyle. Bolton went on to win 4–0.

On 8 July, Johnston suffered an injury in a pre-season friendly at Bamber Bridge and three days later the club confirmed that he was likely to miss the whole of the following season. In spite of this, on 1 August, Johnston signed a new deal taking him up to 2026.

On 26 May 2026, the club confirmed that Johnston would leave at the end of his contract.

=== Luton Town ===
On 9 June 2026, Johnston agreed to join League One club Luton Town on a free transfer. He made his competitive debut for the club against Gillingham in the EFL Cup on 8 August.

== International career ==
Born in England, Johnston is eligible to play for Scotland.

He made his debut for the Under-21s team on 22 March 2019 in a friendly against Mexico, having previously represented the Under-20s.

== Career statistics ==
As of match played 21 November 2026

Appearances and goals by club, season and competition
Club	Season	League			National cup (Note: Includes KNVB Cup, FA Cup)		League cup (Note: Includes EFL Cup)		Other		Total	
Club	Season	Division	Apps	Goals	Apps	Goals	Apps	Goals	Apps	Goals	Apps	Goals
Feyenoord	2019–20	Eredivisie	0	0	0	0	—		0	0	0	0
Feyenoord	2020–21	Eredivisie	4	0	0	0	—		0	0	4	0
Feyenoord	Total		4	0	0	0	—		0	0	4	0
Wigan Athletic (loan)	2020–21	League One	22	1	—		—		—		22	1
Bolton Wanderers	2021–22	League One	43	2	1	0	2	0	2 (Note: Appearances in EFL Trophy)	0	48	2
Bolton Wanderers	2022–23	League One	36	1	0	0	2	0	7 (Note: Five appearances in EFL Trophy, two appearances in League One play-offs)	0	45	1
Bolton Wanderers	2023–24	League One	0	0	0	0	0	0	0	0	0	0
Bolton Wanderers	2024–25	League One	38	0	1	0	3	0	6	0	48	0
Bolton Wanderers	2025–26	League One	43	1	1	0	1	0	5 (Note: Two appearances in EFL Trophy, three appearances League One play-offs)	0	50	1
Bolton Wanderers	Total		160	4	3	0	8	0	20	0	191	4
Luton Town	2026–27	League One	15	0	1	0	2	0	2	0	20	0
Career total			201	5	4	0	10	0	22	0	237	5

== Honours ==
Bolton Wanderers

- EFL Trophy: 2022–23
- EFL League One play-offs: 2026
