= Xavier Simons =

English footballer (born 2003)

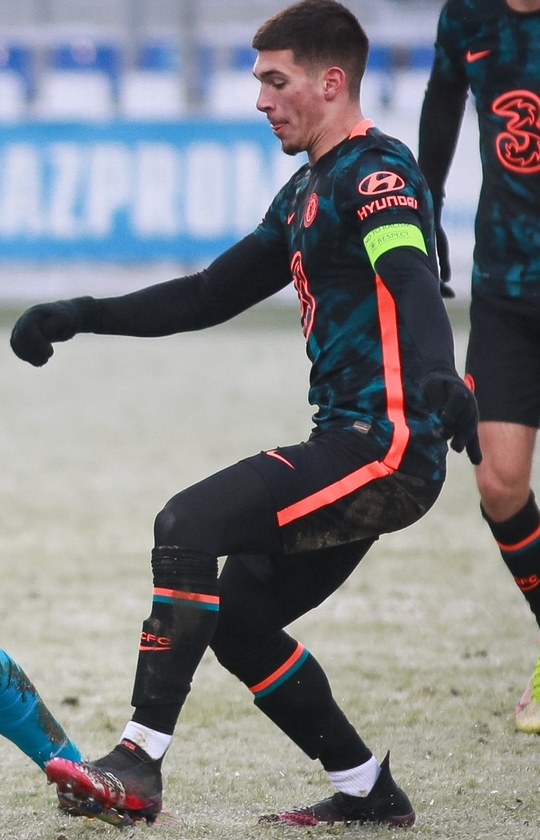
- Simons in the UEFA Youth League in 2021

Personal information
- Full name: Xavier Levi Simons
- Date of birth: 20 February 2003 (age 23)
- Place of birth: Hammersmith, London, England
- Height: 6 ft 0 in (1.83 m)
- Position: Defensive midfielder

Team information
- Current team: Bolton Wanderers
- Number: 4

Youth career
- –2016: Brentford
- 2016–2021: Chelsea

Senior career*
Years	Team	Apps	(Gls)
2021–2023	Chelsea	0	(0)
2022–2023	→ Hull City (loan)	12	(0)
2023–2025	Hull City	22	(2)
2023–2024	→ Fleetwood Town (loan)	12	(1)
2025	→ Wycombe Wanderers (loan)	14	(0)
2025–	Bolton Wanderers	35	(2)

International career
2017	England U15	1	(0)
2018	England U16	1	(0)
2019	England U17	3	(1)
2022	England U19	3	(0)
2023	England U20	2	(0)
- * Club domestic league appearances and goals as of 02:14, 28 September 2026 (UTC)

Xavier Levi Simons (born 20 February 2003) is an English professional footballer who plays as a defensive midfielder for EFL Championship club Bolton Wanderers.

== Early life ==
Simons is of Dutch descent on his father's side and Sri Lankan descent on his mother's side through his grandfather. Simons is second cousin of Portsmouth midfielder Andre Dozzell.

== Club career ==
=== Chelsea ===
Simons signed for Chelsea in 2016 from local rivals Brentford. He made his Chelsea debut on 22 December 2021 in the quarterfinals of the EFL Cup, starting in a 2–0 win against his former club at Brentford Community Stadium.

=== Hull City ===
On 1 September 2022, he moved on loan to Hull City for the season. On 16 March 2023, it was announced that Simons would join Hull City permanently in July. He scored his first goal for the club on 23 October 2024 in the 1–1 home draw against Burnley.

==== Fleetwood Town (loan) ====
On 1 September 2023, Simons joined EFL League One club Fleetwood Town on loan for the remainder of the 2023–24 season. On 20 April 2024, Simons scored his first goal for Fleetwood Town.

==== Wycombe Wanderers (loan) ====
On 3 February 2025, Simons moved on loan to Wycombe Wanderers for the remainder of the 2024–25 season.

=== Bolton Wanderers ===
On 12 June 2025, it was announced that Simons had moved to Bolton Wanderers on a four-year contract for an undisclosed fee from Hull City.

== International career ==
Having represented England from U15 through to U17 level, Simons made his U19 debut as a substitute in a 3–1 win over Republic of Ireland during 2022 UEFA European Under-19 Championship qualification at the Bescot Stadium on 23 March 2022.

On 21 May 2023, Simons was added to the England squad for the 2023 FIFA U-20 World Cup as a replacement for the injured Aaron Ramsey. He made his U20 debut as a substitute in the opening game of the tournament, a 1–0 victory over Tunisia.

== Career statistics ==
As of 20 September 2026

Appearances and goals by club, season and competition
Club	Season	League			FA Cup		League Cup		Europe		Other		Total	
Club	Season	Division	Apps	Goals	Apps	Goals	Apps	Goals	Apps	Goals	Apps	Goals	Apps	Goals
Chelsea U21	2019–20	—			—		—		—		1 (Note: Appearances in EFL Trophy)	0	1	0
Chelsea U21	2021–22	—			—		—		—		4	0	4	0
Chelsea U21	Total		0	0	0	0	0	0	0	0	5	0	5	0
Chelsea	2021–22	Premier League	0	0	0	0	1	0	0	0	0	0	1	0
Hull City (loan)	2022–23	Championship	12	0	1	0	0	0	—		—		13	0
Hull City	2023–24	Championship	2	0	0	0	1	0	—		—		3	0
Hull City	2024–25	Championship	19	2	1	0	1	0	—		—		21	2
Hull City	Total		21	2	2	0	1	0	0	0	0	0	24	2
Fleetwood Town (loan)	2023–24	League One	13	1	0	0	3	0	—		—		16	1
Bolton Wanderers	2025–26	League One	32	1	0	0	0	0	—		6 (Note: Three Appearances in the EFL Trophy, three appearances in the League One play-offs)	1	38	2
Bolton Wanderers	2026-27	Championship	3	1	0	0	1	0	—		—		4	1
Bolton Wanderers	Total		35	2	0	0	1	0	0	0	6	1	42	3
Career total			81	5	2	0	7	0	0	0	11	1	101	6

== Honours ==
Bolton Wanderers

- EFL League One play-offs: 2026
