= Mason Burstow =

English footballer (born 2003)

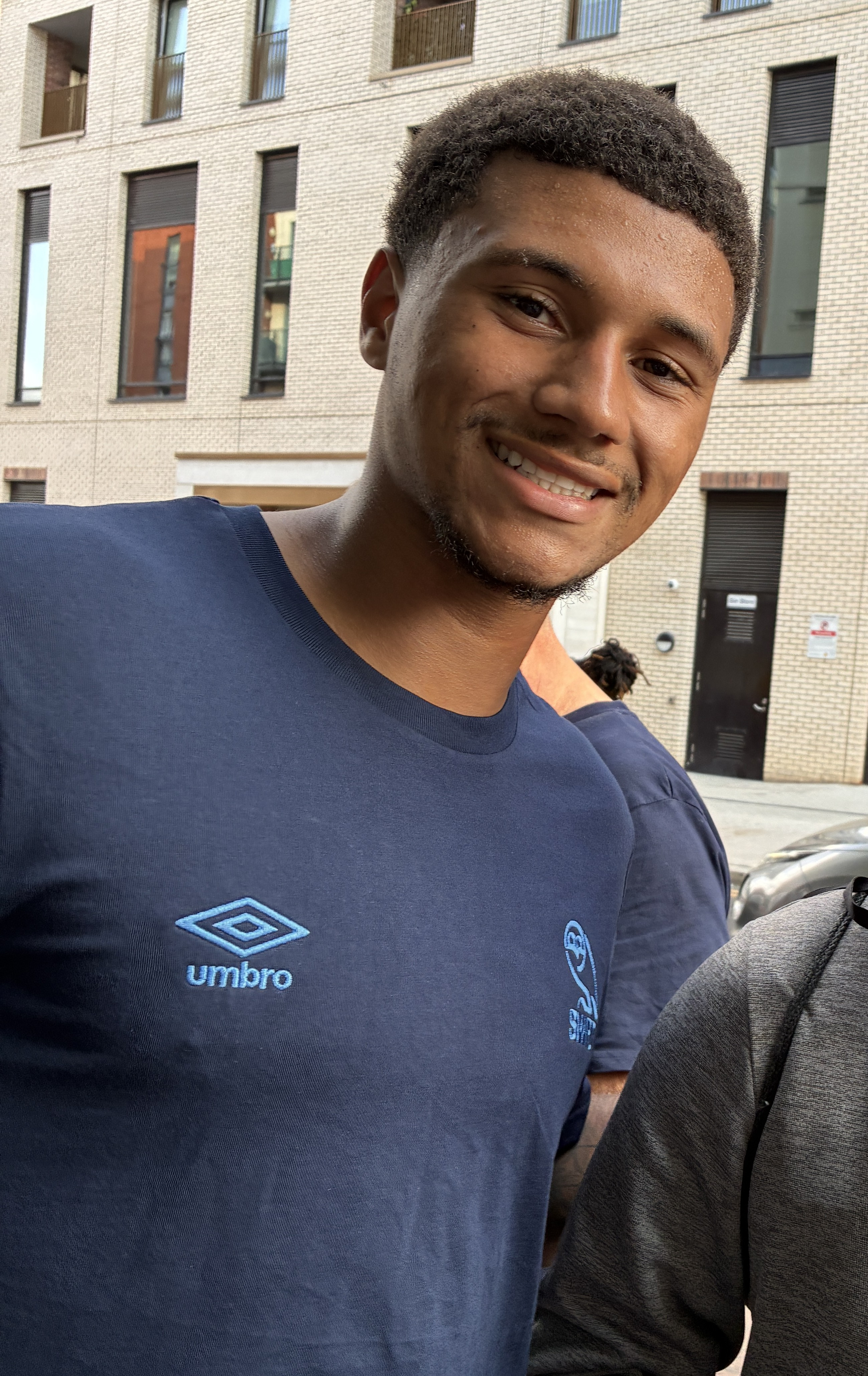
- Burstow in 2026

Personal information
- Full name: Mason Paul James Burstow
- Date of birth: 4 August 2003 (age 23)
- Place of birth: Greenwich, England
- Position: Forward

Team information
- Current team: Sheffield Wednesday (on loan from Hull City)
- Number: 48

Youth career
- –2020: Welling United
- 2020: Maidstone United
- 2020–2021: Charlton Athletic

Senior career*
Years	Team	Apps	(Gls)
2021–2022	Charlton Athletic	7	(2)
2022–2024	Chelsea	2	(0)
2022	→ Charlton Athletic (loan)	9	(0)
2023–2024	→ Sunderland (loan)	20	(1)
2024–	Hull City	31	(2)
2025–2026	→ Bolton Wanderers (loan)	45	(12)
2026–	→ Sheffield Wednesday (loan)	11	(2)

International career
2023	England U20	2	(0)
- * Club domestic league appearances and goals as of 16:04, 1 November 2026 (UTC)

Mason Paul James Burstow (born 4 August 2003) is an English professional footballer who plays as a forward for EFL League One club Sheffield Wednesday, on loan from Premier League club Hull City.

== Career ==
=== Charlton Athletic ===
Burstow came through the youth ranks at Welling United and Maidstone United before joining Charlton Athletic in 2020. He made his debut for the club on 31 August 2021 in a 6–1 EFL Trophy victory over Crawley Town where he scored Charlton's fifth goal of the night with his first touch in professional football.

=== Chelsea ===
On 1 February 2022, Burstow joined Premier League side Chelsea, remaining on loan at Charlton Athletic until the end of the 2021–22 season. He was the last signing for the club under former owner Roman Abramovich. He made his debut for Chelsea on 20 August 2023 in a 1–3 Premier League defeat to West Ham.

==== Sunderland (loan) ====
On 1 September 2023, Burstow joined EFL Championship club Sunderland on a season-long loan. He scored his goal for the Black Cats on 27 January 2024 in a 3–1 home win over Stoke City.

=== Hull City ===
On 16 August 2024, Burstow signed for Hull City on a four-year deal for an undisclosed fee. He made his debut for Hull on 17 August, when he replaced Óscar Estupiñán in a 1–1 away draw against Plymouth Argyle. He scored his first goal for the club on 30 November 2024, when he came off the bench as a half-time substitute for Kasey Palmer in the 1–3 loss to Middlesbrough.

==== Bolton Wanderers (loan) ====
On 28 July 2025, Burstow joined League One side Bolton Wanderers on a season long loan. He made his Bolton debut on 3 August 2025 in the 2–0 defeat to Stockport County at Edgeley Park and scored his first goal for the club a week later on 9 August 2025 as they defeated Plymouth Argyle 2–0 at the Toughsheet Community Stadium.

==== Sheffield Wednesday (loan) ====
On 31 July 2026, Burstow returned to League One, joining Sheffield Wednesday on a season-long loan. He was one of eight players to make their debut against Bolton Wanderers in the EFL Cup, starting the game in a 1–0 win. On 29 August, he got his first goal goal for Wednesday, scoring the second goal in a 7–2 victory against Bromley firing low past the keeper.

== International career ==
On 12 October 2023, Burstow made his England U20 debut in a 0–2 defeat to Romania in Bucharest.

== Career statistics ==
As of 1 November 2026

Appearances and goals by club, season and competition
Club	Season	League			FA Cup		EFL Cup		Other		Total	
Club	Season	Division	Apps	Goals	Apps	Goals	Apps	Goals	Apps	Goals	Apps	Goals
Charlton Athletic	2021–22	League One	16	2	2	1	0	0	5 (Note: Appearances in EFL Trophy)	3	23	6
Chelsea	2022–23	Premier League	0	0	0	0	0	0	0	0	0	0
Chelsea	2023–24	Premier League	2	0	0	0	1	0	—		3	0
Chelsea	Total		2	0	0	0	1	0	0	0	3	0
Chelsea U21	2022–23	—			—		—		4	1	4	1
Sunderland (loan)	2023–24	Championship	20	1	0	0	0	0	—		20	1
Hull City	2024–25	Championship	31	2	1	0	0	0	—		32	2
Hull City	2025–26	Championship	0	0	0	0	0	0	—		0	0
Hull City	2026–27	Premier League	0	0	0	0	0	0	—		0	0
Hull City	Total		31	2	1	0	0	0	0	0	32	2
Bolton Wanderers (loan)	2025–26	League One	45	12	2	0	1	0	5 (Note: Two appearances in the EFL Trophy and three appearances in the EFL League One play-offs)	0	53	12
Sheffield Wednesday (loan)	2026–27	League One	11	2	0	0	2	0	2	0	15	2
Career total			125	19	5	1	4	0	16	4	150	24

== Honours ==
Bolton Wanderers

- EFL League One play-offs: 2026
