= Sonny Sharples-Ahmed =

Egyptian footballer

Personal information
- Full name: Sonny Sharples-Ahmed
- Date of birth: 24 March 2005 (age 21)
- Place of birth: Salford, England
- Position: Midfielder

Team information
- Current team: Hednesford Town

Youth career
- –2023: Bolton Wanderers

Senior career*
Years	Team	Apps	(Gls)
2023–2026	Bolton Wanderers	3	(0)
2023–2024	→ Bamber Bridge (loan)	1	(0)
2025	→ Torquay United (loan)	5	(0)
2026	→ Spennymoor Town (loan)	7	(0)
2026–	Hednesford Town	0	(0)

International career^{‡}
2025–	Egypt U23	1	(0)
- * Club domestic league appearances and goals as of 16:36, 19 June 2026 (UTC) ‡ National team caps and goals as of 21:56, 23 March 2025 (UTC)

Sonny Sharples-Ahmed (born 24 March 2005) is a footballer who plays as a midfielder for National League North club Hednesford Town. Born in England, he represents Egypt at youth level.

== Career ==
=== Bolton Wanderers ===
Sharples-Ahmed came through the Bolton Wanderers Academy. He signed his first professional contract with the club on 14 April 2023.

Sharples-Ahmed made his Bolton debut on 14 November 2023 in a 2–0 victory against Stockport County in the EFL Trophy, coming on in the 86th minute as a substitute for Dan Nlundulu. On 15 December 2023, he joined Bamber Bridge on a one-month loan.

On 3 December 2024, Sharples-Ahmed made his league debut for Bolton in a 3–1 victory over Mansfield Town, coming on as a 90th-minute substitute for John McAtee. Following his league debut, manager Ian Evatt confirmed that Sharples-Ahmed was now part of the first team squad.

=== Hednesford Town ===
On 19 June 2026, he left Bolton to sign for Hednesford Town for an undisclosed fee.

He had previously spent time away from Wanderers on loan at Bamber Bridge, Torquay United and Spennymoor Town.

== International career ==
He participated with the Egyptian national team U23 for the first time on 19 March 2025 against Qatar national team U23 in a friendly match in Doha.
