= Dubious Goals Committee =

Committee in English football leagues

A Dubious Goals Committee is a committee in the English football leagues which adjudicates in any instance where the identity of the scorer of a goal is disputed.

The Premier League Committee meets on an ad hoc basis, whenever a disputed goal is brought to its attention. This is generally around three or four times each season.

The EFL Dubious Goals Committee exists for the English Football League.

== EPL Committee ==
The EPL Committee is made up of three former football players or football officials. The identity of the Committee members at any given time is kept secret in order to protect Committee members from undue influence to make any particular decision.

== Role of a committee ==
The role of a committee is solely to determine the identity of the goal scorer to be entered into the separate official records of that player, his club, and the league. The committee does not enquire into:

- whether a goal has been scored. This is a matter for the officials attending the match in question.
- Assists. If such statistics are collected, these are attributed to players by their clubs.

== Adjudication process ==
The adjudication process comprises the viewing of video evidence followed by discussion by the committee members. The guiding principle when adjudicating is as follows:

As a rule, if the initial attempt is goalbound it is credited to the player making the goal attempt. However if the deflection means that a wayward effort results in a goal then it is attributed to the player who had the last definitive touch of the ball.

== See also ==
- Official scorer (Major League Baseball)
