= 2026–27 Northampton Town F.C. season =

130th season in existence of Northampton Town FC

Northampton Town
2026–27 season
- Chairman: Kelvin Thomas (until 30 September); Joao Xavier; Tim Chamberlain (from 30 September)
- Manager: Chris Hogg
- Stadium: Sixfields Stadium
- EFL Cup: First round
- Top goalscorer: League: Matty Warhurst; Joe O'Brien-Whitmarsh (2 each); All: Matty Warhurst (3)
- Highest home attendance: 7,120 v Swindon Town
Away colours

The 2026–27 season is Northampton Town's 130th season in their history and their first season back in League Two after relegation from League One. Alongside competing in League Two, the club also participate in the FA Cup, EFL Cup and EFL Trophy. The season covers the period from 1 July 2026 to 30 June 2027.

== Current squad ==
As of 24 October 2026

Italics indicate a loaned in player

No.	Name	Position	Nat.	Place of birth	Date of birth (age)	Apps	Goals	Previous club	Date signed	Fee	Contract
Goalkeepers
1	Zach Jeacock	GK	(England)	Birmingham	8 May 2001 (age 25)	13	0	Lincoln City	11 June 2026	Loan	2027
31	James Dadge	GK	(England)	Northampton	18 October 2004 (age 22)	1	0	Academy	1 July 2023	N/A	2027
34	Ross Fitzsimons	GK	(England)	Hammersmith	28 May 1994 (age 32)	32	0	Scunthorpe United	9 June 2025	Free	2027
Defenders
3	James Maxwell	LB	(Scotland)	Crewe (ENG)	9 December 2001 (age 24)	11	0	Doncaster Rovers	23 June 2026	Free	2028
5	Jon Guthrie (c)	CB	(England)	Devizes	29 July 1992 (age 34)	189	17	Livingston	24 June 2021	Free	2027
6	Elliott Moore	CB	(England)	Coalville	16 March 1997 (age 29)	26	0	Oxford United	10 January 2026	Free	2027
15	Conor McCarthy	CB	(Republic of Ireland)	Blarney	11 April 1998 (age 28)	38	2	Barnsley	23 June 2025	Free	2027
16	Joe Wormleighton	RB	(England)	Leicester	30 December 2003 (age 22)	32	0	Leicester City	11 July 2025	Free	2027
22	Josh Powell	LB	(England)	Nottingham	9 January 2005 (age 21)	6	0	Nottingham Forest	1 September 2026	Loan	2027
30	Jack Burroughs	RB	(Scotland)	Coventry (ENG)	21 March 2001 (age 25)	33	0	Coventry City	29 May 2025	Free	2027
35	Max Dyche	CB	(England)	Northampton	22 February 2003 (age 23)	104	3	Academy	12 December 2020	N/A	2027
44	Janoi Donacien	RB	(Saint Lucia)	Castries	30 December 2003 (age 22)	9	0	Chesterfield	26 June 2026	Free	2027
Midfielders
4	Joe O'Brien-Whitmarsh	CM	(Republic of Ireland)	Dublin	11 May 2005 (age 21)	11	2	Southampton	17 August 2026	Undisclosed	2029
8	Lee Evans	CM	(Wales)	Newport	24 July 1994 (age 32)	10	0	Bradford City	7 August 2026	Free	2027
10	Elliott List	W	(England)	Camberwell	12 May 1997 (age 29)	47	3	Stevenage	19 June 2025	Free	2027
11	Kamarai Swyer	W	(England)	Redbridge	4 December 2002 (age 23)	47	5	West Ham United	30 May 2025	Free	2027
14	Tyrese Fornah	CM	(Sierra Leone)	Canning Town (ENG)	11 September 1999 (age 27)	52	1	Derby County	25 June 2025	Free	2028
19	Owen Dale	W	(England)	Warrington	1 November 1998 (age 28)	8	0	Oxford United	1 September 2026	Free	2027
20	Logan Briggs	AM	(Wales)	Northampton (ENG)	7 February 2005 (age 21)	8	1	Leicester City	2 July 2026	Loan	2027
21	Jack Perkins	CM	(England)	Nottingham	23 October 2003 (age 23)	40	1	Nottingham Forest	19 May 2025	Undisclosed	2027
24	Connor Evans	AM	(Wales)	Swansea	24 January 1997 (age 29)	11	0	Milton Keynes Dons	22 July 2026	Free	2028
26	Sam Chambers	AM	(Scotland)	Leeds (ENG)	18 August 2007 (age 19)	3	0	Leeds United	1 September 2026	Loan	2027
29	Liam Shaw	CM	(England)	Sheffield	12 March 2001 (age 25)	8	2	Fleetwood Town	3 January 2025	Undisclosed	2027
Forwards
7	Sam Hoskins	FW	(England)	Dorchester	4 February 1993 (age 33)	478	105	Yeovil Town	1 August 2015	Free	2028
9	Matty Warhurst	FW	(England)	Stalybridge	25 September 2006 (age 20)	13	3	Manchester City	21 July 2026	Undisclosed	2029
17	Nathan Opoku	FW	(Ghana)	Accra	22 July 2001 (age 25)	8	1	Leicester City	21 August 2026	Undisclosed	2029
32	Harvey Saunders	FW	(England)	Wolverhampton	20 July 1997 (age 29)	8	0	Tranmere Rovers	3 June 2026	Free	2028
40	Neo Dobson	FW	(England)	Hackney	6 December 2006 (age 19)	10	3	Academy	1 September 2023	N/A	2027

== Managerial changes ==
Prior to the season starting, Chris Hogg was appointed as manager on a two-year contract.

== Pre-season and friendlies ==
On 13 May, Northampton announced a pre-season fixture against Coventry City. A week later, a trip to Solihull Moors and Cambridge United was confirmed. On 1 June, a fourth opponent was confirmed for pre-season against Southend United. Two further fixtures were later added against Birmingham City and Leicester City.

Win Draw Loss

11 July 2026 Friendly	Leicester City	3–0	Northampton Town	Seagrave
12:00 BST	Mavididi 6'; Alves 17', 22'	Report		Stadium: LCFC Training Ground; Attendance: 0 (BCD); Referee: Ruebyn Ricardo

18 July 2026 Friendly	Northampton Town	0–0	Coventry City	Northampton
14:00 BST		Report		Stadium: Sixfields Stadium; Attendance: 5,060 (3,041); Referee: Andy Woolmer

22 July 2026 Friendly	Southend United	1–3	Northampton Town	Southend-on-Sea
19:30 BST	Hyams 83'	Report	Dyche 7'; M.Warhurst 39'; H.Saunders 71'	Stadium: Roots Hall; Attendance: 1,720 (64)

25 July 2026 Friendly	Northampton Town	0–2	Birmingham City	Northampton
15:00 BST		Report	D.Gray (x2)	Stadium: Sixfields Stadium; Attendance: 1,678 (526); Referee: Andrew Humphries

28 July 2026 Friendly	Cambridge United	0–0	Northampton Town	Cambridge
19:30 BST		Report		Stadium: Cledara Abbey Stadium; Referee: Neil Hair

1 August 2026 Friendly	Solihull Moors	2–4	Northampton Town	Solihull
13:00 BST	Green 5'; Wakeling 67'	Report	M.Warhurst 31'; C.Evans 36'; E.List 51' (pen.); S.Hoskins 65'	Stadium: ARMCO Arena; Referee: Robert Massey-Ellis

== Competitions ==
=== League Two ===
==== League table ====
Pos	Team	Pld	W	D	L	GF	GA	GD	Pts
16	Bristol Rovers	16	6	1	9	20	25	−5	19
17	Swindon Town	16	5	4	7	16	23	−7	19
18	Northampton Town	15	4	6	5	13	13	0	18
19	Port Vale	14	5	3	6	15	18	−3	18
20	Oldham Athletic	16	4	4	8	17	22	−5	16

Updated to match(es) played on 21 November 2026. Source: EFL Official Website
Rules for classification: 1) Points; 2) Goal difference; 3) Number of goals scored; 4) Head-to-head results; 5) Wins; 6) Away goals; 7) Penalty points (sec 9.5); 8) 12-point sending off offences

==== Results summary ====
Overall								Home						Away					
Pld	W	D	L	GF	GA	GD	Pts	W	D	L	GF	GA	GD	W	D	L	GF	GA	GD
15	4	6	5	13	13	0	18	3	2	3	7	6	+1	1	4	2	6	7	−1

Last updated: 21 November 2026.
Source: Soccerway

==== League position by match ====
Round	1	2	3	4	5	6	7	10	11	12	13	14	9^{2}	15	16	8^{1}	17	18	19	20	21	22	23	24	25	26	27
Ground	H	A	A	H	H	A	H	A	A	H	H	A	H	A	H	A	A	H	A	H	A	H	H	A	H	A	A
Result	D	L	D	D	W	L	L	D	W	L	W	D	L	D	W												
Position	13	18	19	18	14	17	22	23	22	23	19	20	21	19	18												

A = Away; H = Home; W = Win; D = Draw; L = Loss; P = Postponed
Notes:
- ^{1} Matchday 8 (vs. Port Vale) was postponed due to international call-ups.
- ^{1} Matchday 9 (vs. Oldham Athletic) was postponed due to international call-ups.

==== Matches ====
On 25 June, the League Two fixtures were revealed.

Win Draw Loss Fixtures

15 August 2026 1	Northampton Town	0–0	Swindon Town	Northampton
15:00 BST		Report	M. Clark (yellow card) 37'; T. Nichols (yellow card) 73'	Stadium: Sixfields Stadium; Attendance: 7,120 (1,534); Referee: Scott Oldham

22 August 2026 2	Crewe Alexandra	1–0	Northampton Town	Crewe
15:00 BST	J. March (yellow card) 37', (goal) 53'	Report	L. Evans (yellow card) 87'	Stadium: Mornflake Stadium; Attendance: 5,375 (861); Referee: Lewis Sandoe

29 August 2026 3	Gillingham	1–1	Northampton Town	Gillingham
15:00 BST	R. McKenzie (yellow card) 4'; C. McManus 7'; O. Beckles (yellow card) 14'	Report	T. Fornah (yellow card) 26'; L. Briggs 36', (yellow card) 72'; J. Maxwell (yellow card) 54'; M. Dyche (yellow card) 79'	Stadium: MEMS Priestfield Stadium; Attendance: 5,701 (537); Referee: Elliott Swallow

1 September 2026 4	Northampton Town	1–1	Crawley Town	Northampton
19:45 BST	N. Opoku 38'; L. Evans (red card) 55'	Report	K. Krasniqi (yellow card) 42'; J. Arthurs (yellow card) 60'; D .Pereira 67'	Stadium: Sixfields Stadium; Attendance: 4,890 (270); Referee: Alan Dale

5 September 2026 5	Northampton Town	1–0	Newport County	Northampton
15:00 BST	M. Warhurst (yellow card) 60'; J. Wormleighton (yellow card) 71'; J. O'Brien-Whitmarsh 87'; L. Briggs (yellow card) 90+3'	Report	M. Dibley-Dias (yellow card) 31'; C. Evans (yellow card) 86'	Stadium: Sixfields Stadium; Attendance: 5,546 (368); Referee: Alan Young

12 September 2026 6	Shrewsbury Town	2–0	Northampton Town	Shrewsbury
15:00 BST	K.McMahon-Brown 8', (yellow card) 57'; K.Berkoe 45'	Report	S.Chambers (yellow card) 81'	Stadium: The Croud Meadow; Attendance: 5,003 (582); Referee: Emily Heaslip

19 September 2026 7	Northampton Town	0–1	Rotherham United	Northampton
15:00 BST	M. Dyche (yellow card) 72'; T. Fornah (yellow card) 85'		J.Austerfield (yellow card) 48'; O. Ashley (yellow card) 66'	Stadium: Sixfields Stadium; Attendance: 5,771 (716); Referee: Will Finnie

10 October 2026 10	York City	1–1	Northampton Town	Huntington
15:00 BST	H.Boyes (yellow card) 49'; O.Pearce 85'; F.Maguire (yellow card) 86'	Report	J.O'Brien-Whitmarsh 10'; J.Powell (yellow card) 40'	Stadium: LNER Community Stadium; Attendance: 8,209 (879); Referee: Michael Barlow

17 October 2026 11	Grimsby Town	0–2	Northampton Town	Cleethorpes
15:00 BST	D.Tharme (yellow card) 28'; C.Vernam (yellow card) 42'; E.Pruti (red card) 61'; J.Walker (yellow card) 72'	Report	M.Warhurst 34'; J.Powell (yellow card) 54'; J.Guthrie 58', (yellow card) 74'	Stadium: Blundell Park; Attendance: 6,911 (415); Referee: Martin Woods

20 October 2026 12	Northampton Town	0–1	Tranmere Rovers	Northampton
19:45 BST		Report	B.Faulkner 37'; R.Watson (yellow card) 42'; L.O'Connor (yellow card) 90+1'	Stadium: Sixfields Stadium; Attendance: 4,918 (362); Referee: Aaron Jackson

24 October 2026 13	Northampton Town	2–0	Colchester United	Northampton
12:30 BST	M.Warhurst 9'; L.Evans (yellow card) 32'; S.Hoskins (yellow card) 15', (goal) 50'	Report	M.Sesay (yellow card) 30'	Stadium: Sixfields Stadium; Attendance: 5,959 (601); Referee: Scott Jackson
Note: Fixture was initially scheduled for a 15:00 kick-off, but was brought forward for live Sky Sports broadcasting.

31 October 2026 14	Accrington Stanley	1–1	Northampton Town	Accrington
15:00 GMT	Warren 5'; Mols (yellow card) 75'	Report	Warhurst (yellow card) 46'; Moore (yellow card) 66'; List 90+2'	Stadium: Wham Stadium; Attendance: 1,979 (552 Cobblers fans); Referee: Niall Smith

3 November 2026 9	Northampton Town	0–1	Oldham Athletic	Northampton
19:45 GMT	Dale (yellow card) 64'	Report	Norburn 70'	Stadium: Sixfields Stadium; Attendance: 5,098; Referee: Carl Brook
Note: Fixture was originally scheduled for 3 October, but was postponed due to international call-ups.

14 November 2026 15	Salford City	1–1	Northampton Town	Kersal
15:00 GMT	Butcher (yellow card) 19'; Cesay 64'	Report	Moore 2'; O'Brien-Whitmarsh (yellow card) 17'; Maxwell (yellow card) 31'; Dale (yellow card) 51'	Stadium: AIG Stadium; Attendance: 3,525; Referee: Ben Toner

21 November 2026 16	Northampton Town	3–2	Rochdale	Northampton
15:00 GMT	Dale 11'; Warhurst (yellow card) 35'; C. Evans (yellow card) 63'; List 65'; L. Evans (yellow card) 69', (goal) 74' (pen.)	Report	Allen (yellow card) 24'; Francis 51'; Hayes 53'; Ebanks-Landell (yellow card) 61'; Taylor (yellow card) 64'	Stadium: Sixfields Stadium; Attendance: 5,515 (291 away supporters); Referee: Callum Jones

24 November 2026 8	Port Vale	v	Northampton Town	Burslem
19:45 GMT				Stadium: Vale Park
Note: Fixture was originally scheduled for 26 September, but was postponed due to international call-ups within the Port Vale squad.

28 November 2026 17	Walsall	v	Northampton Town	Walsall
15:00 GMT				Stadium: Pallet-Track Bescot Stadium

1 December 2026 18	Northampton Town	v	Fleetwood Town	Northampton
19:45 GMT				Stadium: Sixfields Stadium

12 December 2026 19	Barnet	v	Northampton Town	Edgware
15:00 GMT				Stadium: The Hive Stadium

19 December 2026 20	Northampton Town	v	Exeter City	Northampton
12:30 GMT				Stadium: Sixfields Stadium
Note: Fixture was initially scheduled for a 15:00 kick-off, but was brought forward for live Sky Sports broadcasting.

26 December 2026 21	Chesterfield	v	Northampton Town	Whittington Moor
15:00 GMT				Stadium: SMH Group Stadium

29 December 2026 22	Northampton Town	v	Cheltenham Town	Northampton
19:45 GMT				Stadium: Sixfields Stadium

2 January 2027 23	Northampton Town	v	Bristol Rovers	Northampton
15:00 GMT				Stadium: Sixfields Stadium
Note: Fixture was initially scheduled for 1 January, but was pushed back by 24 hours after both teams agreed to reschedule to allow extra player recovery time over the festive period.

9 January 2027 24	Exeter City	v	Northampton Town	Exeter
15:00 GMT				Stadium: St James Park

16 January 2027 25	Northampton Town	v	Grimsby Town	Northampton
15:00 GMT				Stadium: Sixfields Stadium

19 January 2027 26	Tranmere Rovers	v	Northampton Town	Birkenhead
19:45 GMT				Stadium: Prenton Park

23 January 2027 27	Colchester United	v	Northampton Town	Colchester
12:30 GMT				Stadium: JobServe Community Stadium
Note: Fixture was initially scheduled for a 15:00 kick-off, but was brought forward for live Sky Sports broadcasting.

=== FA Cup ===
Northampton were drawn away to York City in the first round.

Win Draw Loss

7 November 2026 First round	York City	4–0	Northampton Town	Huntington
15:00 GMT	Pearce 1', 11'; Hunt 29'; Stones 81'	Report	Wormleighton (yellow card) 41'	Stadium: LNER Community Stadium; Attendance: 4,273 (413 Cobblers' fans); Referee: Martin Coy

=== EFL Cup ===
Northampton were drawn away to Leicester City in the first round.

Win Draw Loss

8 August 2026 First round	Leicester City	1–0	Northampton Town	Leicester
15:00 BST	C.Okoli 15'; B.De Cordova-Reid (yellow card) 37'; S.Braybrooke (yellow card) 42'; W.Burns (yellow card) 83'; T.Watson (yellow card) 90+8'	Report	H.Saunders (yellow card) 90+3'	Stadium: King Power Stadium; Attendance: 9,792; Referee: Ollie Yates

=== EFL Trophy ===
Win Draw Loss

==== Group stage ====
Northampton Town were drawn against Cambridge United, Gillingham and Brighton & Hove Albion U21 in Southern Group G.

Pos	Div	Team	Pld	W	PW	PL	L	GF	GA	GD	Pts	Qualification
1	L1	Cambridge United	3	3	0	0	0	12	2	+10	9	Advance to Round 2
2	L2	Gillingham	3	2	0	0	1	7	8	−1	6	Advance to Round 2
3	ACA	Brighton & Hove Albion U21	3	1	0	0	2	6	10	−4	3	
4	L2	Northampton Town	3	0	0	0	3	2	7	−5	0	

Source: EFL

18 August 2026 Group stage	Northampton Town	0–3	Brighton & Hove Albion U21	Northampton
19:00 BST	J.Wormleighton (yellow card) 65'	Report	C.Tasker 8'; K.Doyle 15'; M.O'Mahony (yellow card) 22', (goal) 52' (pen.)	Stadium: Sixfields Stadium; Attendance: 1,026 (41); Referee: Simon Mather

6 October 2026 Group stage	Cambridge United	2–1	Northampton Town	Cambridge
19:00 BST	P.Mpanzu 29'; G.Ahadme 62' (pen.); K.Watts (yellow card) 73'	Report	M.Warhurst 51'; J.Powell (yellow card) 72'; C.Evans (yellow card) 82'	Stadium: Cledara Abbey Stadium; Attendance: 888 (100 Cobblers fans); Referee: Aaron Farmer

10 November 2026 Group stage	Northampton Town	1–2	Gillingham	Sixfields
19:00 GMT	List 47'	Report	Sillah 12'; Antwi 54'	Stadium: Sixfields Stadium; Attendance: 667 (70 away fans); Referee: Alex Chilowicz

=== Appearances, goals and cards ===
As of match played 21 November 2026

No.	Pos	Player	League Two			FA Cup			League Cup			League Trophy			Total			Discipline	
No.	Pos	Player	Starts	Sub	Goals	Starts	Sub	Goals	Starts	Sub	Goals	Starts	Sub	Goals	Starts	Sub	Goals	Yellow card	Red card
1	GK	Zach Jeacock	14	–	–	1	–	–	1	–	–	1	–	–	17	–	–	–	–
3	LB	James Maxwell	10	3	–	1	–	–	1	–	–	1	–	–	13	3	–	2	–
4	AM	Joe O'Brien-Whitmarsh	11	3	2	–	–	–	–	–	–	2	–	–	13	3	2	1	–
5	CB	Jon Guthrie	15	–	1	1	–	–	1	–	–	1	1	–	18	1	1	1	–
6	CB	Elliott Moore	15	–	1	1	–	–	1	–	–	1	–	–	18	–	1	1	–
7	W	Sam Hoskins	4	7	1	–	–	–	–	1	–	1	1	–	5	9	1	1	–
8	CM	Lee Evans	12	–	1	1	–	–	–	1	–	1	–	–	14	1	1	3	1
9	ST	Matty Warhurst	11	3	2	1	–	–	–	1	–	1	–	2	13	4	4	3	–
10	W	Elliott List	–	9	2	1	–	–	1	–	–	2	–	1	4	9	3	–	–
11	W	Kamarai Swyer	–	2	–	–	–	–	1	–	–	2	1	–	3	3	–	–	–
14	CM	Tyrese Fornah	7	4	–	1	–	–	1	–	–	1	–	–	10	4	–	2	–
15	CB	Conor McCarthy	2	–	–	–	1	–	–	–	–	1	1	–	3	2	–	–	–
16	RB	Joe Wormleighton	14	–	–	1	–	–	–	1	–	3	–	–	18	1	–	2	–
17	CF	Nathan Opoku	4	3	1	–	–	–	–	–	–	–	1	–	4	4	1	–	–
19	W	Owen Dale	9	2	1	1	–	–	–	–	–	1	–	1	11	2	2	2	–
20	AM	Logan Briggs	5	4	1	–	1	–	–	–	–	2	–	–	7	5	1	2	–
21	CM	Jack Perkins	–	1	–	–	–	–	1	–	–	1	–	–	2	1	–	–	–
22	LB	Josh Powell	5	2	–	–	1	–	–	–	–	1	–	–	6	3	–	3	–
24	AM	Connor Evans	11	2	–	–	–	–	1	–	–	2	–	–	14	2	–	1	–
26	AM	Sam Chambers	2	1	–	–	–	–	–	–	–	–	–	–	2	1	–	1	–
31	GK	James Dadge	–	–	–	–	1	–	–	–	–	–	–	–	–	1	–	–	–
32	CF	Harvey Saunders	3	5	–	–	–	–	1	–	–	2	–	–	6	5	–	–	–
34	GK	Ross Fitzsimons	1	–	–	–	–	–	–	–	–	2	–	–	3	–	–	–	–
35	CB	Max Dyche	1	4	–	1	–	–	–	1	–	2	1	–	4	6	–	2	–
44	RB	Janoi Donacien	9	–	–	–	–	–	1	–	–	1	–	–	11	–	–	–	–
Youth team scholars:
42	LB	Bobby Ashton	–	–	–	–	–	–	–	–	–	1	–	–	1	–	–	–	–

== Transfers and contracts ==
=== Transfers in ===
Date from	Position	Name	From	Fee	Ref.
1 July 2026 (Note: The transfer was announced on 26 June, and would become official on July 1 once Donacien's contract at Chesterfield expired.)	RB	(Saint Lucia) Janoi Donacien	(England) Chesterfield	Free	
1 July 2026 (Note: The transfer was announced on 23 June, and would become official on July 1 once Maxwell's contract at Doncaster Rovers expired.)	LB	(Scotland) James Maxwell	(England) Doncaster Rovers	Free	
1 July 2026 (Note: The transfer was announced on 3 June, and would become official on July 1 once Saunders' contract at Tranmere Rovers expired.)	CF	(England) Harvey Saunders	(England) Tranmere Rovers	Free	
21 July 2026	FW	(England) Matty Warhurst	(England) Manchester City	Undisclosed	
22 July 2026	AM	(Wales) Connor Evans	(England) Milton Keynes Dons	Free	
7 August 2026	CM	(Wales) Lee Evans	(England) Bradford City	Free	
17 August 2026	AM	(Republic of Ireland) Joe O'Brien-Whitmarsh	(England) Southampton	Undisclosed	
21 August 2026	FW	(Ghana) Nathan Opoku	(England) Leicester City	Undisclosed	
1 September 2026	RW	(England) Owen Dale	(England) Oxford United	Free	

=== Loans in ===
Date from	Position	Name	Loaned from	On loan until	Ref.
15 June 2026 (Note: The loan was announced on 11 June, and would become on June 15 once the transfer window opened.)	GK	(England) Zach Jeacock	(England) Lincoln City	End of Season	
2 July 2026	AM	(Wales) Logan Briggs	(England) Leicester City	End of Season	
1 September 2026	AM	(Scotland) Sam Chambers	(England) Leeds United	End of Season	
1 September 2026	LB	(England) Josh Powell	(England) Nottingham Forest	End of Season	

=== Transfers out ===
Date from	Position	Name	To	Fee	Ref.
7 August 2026	DM	(Scotland) Dean Campbell	(England) Notts County	£200,000	

=== Loans out ===
Date from	Position	Name	Loaned to	On loan until	Ref.
8 August 2026	CF	(England) Neo Dobson	(England) St Ives Town	8 September 2026	
12 September 2026	CF	(England) Neo Dobson	(England) Banbury United	12 October 2026	
13 October 2026	CF	(England) Neo Dobson	(England) Halesowen Town	13 November 2026	

=== Released / out of contract ===
Date from	Position	Name	Subsequent club	Joined date	Ref.
30 June 2026	CM	(Northern Ireland) Cameron McGeehan	(England) Barnsley	1 July 2026	
30 June 2026	CB	(England) Josh Tomlinson	(England) Brackley Town	1 July 2026	
30 June 2026	LB	(England) Nesta Guinness-Walker	(Scotland) Aberdeen	8 July 2026	
30 June 2026	GK	(Republic of Ireland) Theo Avery	(England) Ilkeston Town	31 July 2026	
30 June 2026	LW	(England) Michael Jacobs	(England) Harborough Town	15 August 2026	
30 June 2026	GK	(England) Lee Burge	(England) Salford City	11 September 2026	
30 June 2026	CF	(England) Tom Eaves	(England) Gillingham	29 September 2026	
30 June 2026	LW	(England) Kyle Edwards			
30 June 2026	LB	(Scotland) Matthew Ireland			
30 June 2026	CF	(Wales) Jack Vale			
30 June 2026	CB	(England) Jordan Willis			

=== New contract ===
Date from	Position	Name	Contract expiry	Ref.
5 May 2026	CB	(England) Jon Guthrie	30 June 2027	
29 May 2026	RW	(England) Sam Hoskins	30 June 2028	
