= 2025–26 Northampton Town F.C. season =

129th season in existence of Northampton Town FC

Northampton Town
2025–26 season
- Chairman: Kelvin Thomas
- Manager: Kevin Nolan (until 9 March); Colin Calderwood (from 9 March)
- Stadium: Sixfields Stadium
- League One: 24th (relegated)
- FA Cup: First round
- EFL Cup: First round
- EFL Trophy: Semi-finals
- Top goalscorer: League: Tom Eaves (8); All: Tom Eaves (10)
- Highest home attendance: 8,029 v Luton Town
- Lowest home attendance: 802 v Shrewsbury Town
- Average home league attendance: 6,542
Home colours	Away colours	Third colours

The 2025–26 season was Northampton Town's 129th season in their history and their third successive season in League One. Alongside competing in League One, the club also participated in the FA Cup, EFL Cup and EFL Trophy. The season covers the period from 1 July 2025 to 30 June 2026.

== Managerial changes ==
On 9 March, Kevin Nolan was sacked as manager after seventy games at the helm and a 31.4% win ratio.

== Current squad ==
As of 2 May 2026

Italics indicate a loaned in player

No.	Name	Position	Nat.	Place of birth	Date of birth (age)	Apps	Goals	Previous club	Date signed	Fee	Contract
Goalkeepers
1	Lee Burge	GK	(England)	Hereford	9 January 1993 (age 33)	113	0	Sunderland	22 June 2022	Free	2026
31	James Dadge	GK	(England)	Northampton	18 October 2004 (age 22)	1	0	Academy	1 July 2023	N/A	2026
34	Ross Fitzsimons	GK	(England)	Hammersmith	28 May 1994 (age 32)	31	0	Scunthorpe United	9 June 2025	Free	2026
Defenders
2	Jack Burroughs	RB	(Scotland)	Coventry (ENG)	21 March 2001 (age 25)	33	0	Coventry City	29 May 2025	Free	2027
3	Conor McCarthy	CB	(Republic of Ireland)	Blarney	11 April 1998 (age 28)	37	2	Barnsley	23 June 2025	Free	2027
5	Jon Guthrie (c)	CB	(England)	Devizes	29 July 1992 (age 34)	175	16	Livingston	24 June 2021	Free	2026+
6	Jordan Willis	CB	(England)	Coventry	24 August 1994 (age 32)	65	1	Wycombe Wanderers	7 October 2023	Free	2026
12	Nesta Guinness-Walker	LB	(England)	London	14 September 1999 (age 27)	72	3	Reading	27 September 2024	Free	2026
16	Joe Wormleighton	RB	(England)	Leicester	30 December 2003 (age 22)	19	0	Leicester City	11 July 2025	Free	2027
18	Michael Forbes	CB	(Northern Ireland)	Ardboe	29 April 2004 (age 22)	26	2	West Ham United	25 July 2024	Loan	2026
24	Elliott Moore	CB	(England)	Coalville	16 March 1997 (age 29)	17	0	Oxford United	10 January 2026	Free	2027
25	Josh Tomlinson	CB	(England)	Kettering	1 December 2005 (age 20)	5	1	Academy	7 December 2022	N/A	2026+
35	Max Dyche	CB	(England)	Northampton	22 February 2003 (age 23)	96	3	Academy	12 December 2020	N/A	2027
Midfielders
4	Dean Campbell	CM	(Scotland)	Bridge of Don	19 March 2001 (age 25)	48	0	Barrow	19 June 2025	Free	2027
8	Cameron McGeehan	CM	(Northern Ireland)	Kingston (ENG)	6 April 1995 (age 31)	82	18	Colchester United	5 July 2024	Free	2026
10	Elliott List	W	(England)	Camberwell	12 May 1997 (age 29)	40	3	Stevenage	19 June 2025	Free	2027
11	Kamarai Swyer	W	(England)	Redbridge	4 December 2002 (age 23)	42	5	West Ham United	30 May 2025	Free	2027
14	Tyrese Fornah	CM	(Sierra Leone)	Canning Town (ENG)	11 September 1999 (age 27)	41	1	Derby County	25 June 2025	Free	2028
17	Michael Jacobs	AM	(England)	Rothwell	4 November 1991 (age 35)	128	17	Chesterfield	16 June 2025	Free	2026+
21	Jack Perkins	CM	(England)	Nottingham	23 October 2003 (age 23)	37	1	Nottingham Forest	19 May 2025	Undisclosed	2027
22	Kyle Edwards	W	(England)	Dudley	17 February 1998 (age 28)	17	1	Stevenage	1 September 2025	Free	Jan 2026
23	Terry Taylor	CM	(Wales)	Irvine (SCO)	29 June 2001 (age 25)	68	1	Charlton Athletic	11 August 2025	Loan	2026
29	Liam Shaw	CM	(England)	Sheffield	12 March 2001 (age 25)	8	2	Fleetwood Town	3 January 2025	Undisclosed	2027
Forwards
7	Sam Hoskins	FW	(England)	Dorchester	4 February 1993 (age 33)	465	104	Yeovil Town	1 August 2015	Free	2026
9	Tom Eaves	CF	(England)	Liverpool	14 January 1992 (age 34)	62	15	Rotherham United	12 July 2024	Free	2026
15	Jake Evans	FW	(England)	Northampton	21 August 2008 (age 18)	18	2	Leicester City	27 January 2026	Loan	2026
27	Jack Vale	CF	(England)	Liverpool	3 March 2001 (age 25)	25	1	Blackburn Rovers	18 September 2025	Free	2026

== Pre-season and friendlies ==
On 13 and 15 May, Northampton Town announced behind closed doors friendlies against Norwich City and Cambridge United; respectively. A third fixture was added to the schedule, against West Ham United U21s. A fourth fixture was added to the scheduled on May 19, away to Brackley Town. On 9 June, the club announced a training camp in Alicante and a fixture against Millwall.

Also included in the pre-season schedule, was a testimonial for Sam Hoskins against Birmingham City.

Win Draw Loss

5 July 2025 Friendly	Brackley Town	0–0	Northampton Town	Brackley
15:00 BST		Report		Stadium: St James Park; Attendance: 999; Referee: Carl Henry

8 July 2025 Friendly	Northampton Town	0–3	Cambridge United	Northampton
12:00 BST		Report	S.Kaikai 36'; J.Brophy 72'; E.Kachunga 75'	Stadium: Moulton College; Attendance: 0 (Behind closed doors)

12 July 2025 Friendly	Norwich City	3–1	Northampton Town	Colney
13:00 BST	M.Jurásek 26'; L.Sealey 34'; 89' (o.g.)	Report	M.Jacobs 42'	Stadium: Colney Training Centre; Attendance: 0 (Behind closed doors)

15 July 2025 Friendly	Millwall	3–0	Northampton Town	San Pedro del Pinatar, Spain
19:00 CEST	M.Ivanović 4'; L.Cundle 39'; J.Coburn 79'	Report		Stadium: Pinatar Arena

22 July 2025 Friendly	Northampton Town	0–0	West Ham United U21s	Northampton
19:00 BST		Report		Stadium: Sixfields Stadium; Attendance: 1,056; Referee: Joe Woolmer

26 July 2025 Sam Hoskins Testimonial	Northampton Town	3–0	Birmingham City	Northampton
15:00 BST	J.Perkins 4'; S.Hoskins 57'; T.Fornah 89'	Report		Stadium: Sixfields Stadium; Attendance: 2,548 (465); Referee: Andy Woolmer

== Competitions ==
=== League One ===
==== League table ====
Pos	Team	Pld	W	D	L	GF	GA	GD	Pts	Promotion, qualification or relegation
20	Leyton Orient	46	14	10	22	59	71	−12	52	
21	Exeter City (R)	46	12	13	21	52	61	−9	49	Relegation to EFL League Two
22	Port Vale (R)	46	10	12	24	36	61	−25	42	Relegation to EFL League Two
23	Rotherham United (R)	46	10	11	25	41	71	−30	41	Relegation to EFL League Two
24	Northampton Town (R)	46	9	8	29	39	74	−35	35	Relegation to EFL League Two

Source: EFL Official Website
Rules for classification: 1) Points; 2) Goal difference; 3) Number of goals scored; 4) Head-to-head results; 5) Wins; 6) Away goals; 7) Penalty points (sec 9.5); 8) 12-point sending off offences
(R) Relegated

==== Results summary ====
Overall								Home						Away					
Pld	W	D	L	GF	GA	GD	Pts	W	D	L	GF	GA	GD	W	D	L	GF	GA	GD
46	9	8	29	39	74	−35	35	6	4	13	23	31	−8	3	4	16	16	43	−27

Last updated: complete.
Source: Soccerway

==== League position by match ====
Round	1	2	3	4	5	6	8	9	10	11	12	13	7^{1}	14	15	17	18	19	20	21	22	23	24	25	27	28	29	30	16^{2}	31	32	33	34	26^{3}	35	36	37	38	39	41	42	43	44	45	40^{4}	46
Ground	A	H	A	H	H	A	H	A	H	A	H	A	A	H	H	H	A	H	A	H	A	A	H	A	H	A	A	H	A	H	A	A	H	H	H	A	H	A	A	A	H	A	H	A	H	H
Result	L	D	L	L	W	W	W	L	W	D	L	W	L	L	W	L	W	D	L	W	L	L	D	D	L	L	L	L	D	W	D	L	L	L	D	L	L	L	L	L	L	L	L	L	L	L
Position	20	18	21	21	18	15	15	15	13	13	14	11	11	16	13	17	14	14	14	12	16	19	19	19	21	21	22	23	23	19	17	21	22	22	22	23	23	23	23	23	24	24	24	24	24	24

A = Away; H = Home; W = Win; D = Draw; L = Loss; P = Postponed
Notes:
- ^{1} Matchday 7 (vs Reading) was postponed due to international call-ups.
- ^{2} Matchday 16 (vs Barnsley) was postponed due to international call-ups.
- ^{3} Matchday 26 (vs Port Vale) was postponed due to Vale's continued involvement in the FA Cup.
- ^{4} Matchday 40 (vs Barnsley) was postponed due to international call-ups.

==== Matches ====
Win Draw Loss

On 26 June, the League One fixtures were announced.

2 August 2025 1	Wigan Athletic	3–1	Northampton Town	Wigan
15:00 BST	F.Murray 29', 46'; J.Weir 43'	Report	J.Thorniley (yellow card) 64'; M.Forbes 70'; C.McCarthy (yellow card) 76'	Stadium: Brick Community Stadium; Attendance: 9,471; Referee: Alex Chilowicz

9 August 2025 2	Northampton Town	0–0	Bradford City	Northampton
15:00 BST	C.McGeehan (yellow card) 29'; T.Fornah (yellow card) 29'; E.List (yellow card) 40'	Report	B.Pointin (yellow card) 29'; J.Neufville (yellow card) 58'; M.Pennington (yellow card) 82'; W.Swan (yellow card) 87'; C.Tilt (yellow card) 90+2'	Stadium: Sixfields; Attendance: 7,295 (1,546); Referee: Simon Mather

16 August 2025 3	Stevenage	2–0	Northampton Town	Stevenage
15:00 BST	C.Piergianni (yellow card) 20'; D.Butler (yellow card) 33'; D.Kemp 67'; G.Ahadme 82'	Report		Stadium: Broadhall Way; Attendance: 3,350; Referee: Tom Reeves

19 August 2025 4	Northampton Town	0–1	Lincoln City	Northampton
19:45 BST	E.Wheatley (yellow card) 54'; T.Fornah (yellow card) 67'; J.Perkins (yellow card) 87'	Report	F.Draper 20'; R.Towler (yellow card) 42'; C.McGrandles (yellow card) 58'; G.Wickens (yellow card) 79'; E.Hamilton (yellow card) 86'	Stadium: Sixfields; Attendance: 5,729 (626); Referee: Ollie Yates

23 August 2025 5	Northampton Town	2–0	Exeter City	Northampton
15:00 BST	E.Wheatley 1'; M.Dyche 16'	Report	S.Cox (yellow card) 43'; J.Doyle-Hayes (yellow card) 77'; E.Turns (yellow card) 79'; J.Magennis (yellow card) 90+3'	Stadium: Sixfields; Attendance: 5,739 (393); Referee: Edward Duckworth

30 August 2025 6	Leyton Orient	0–1	Northampton Town	Leyton, London
15:00 BST	T.Adaramola (yellow card) 40'; T.James (yellow card) 45+2'; J.Koroma (yellow card) 54'; O.Beckles (yellow card) 90+5'; A.Connolly (yellow card) 90+6'	Report	S.Hoskins 58'	Stadium: Brisbane Road; Attendance: 8,009 (1,026); Referee: Jacob Miles

13 September 2025 8	Northampton Town	1–0	Blackpool	Northampton
12:30 BST	C.McCarthy (yellow card) 28'; C.McGeehan 82'	Report	J.Bowler (yellow card) 9'	Stadium: Sixfields; Attendance: 6,058 (605); Referee: Sebastian Stockbridge
Note: Fixture was initially scheduled for a 15:00 kick-off, but was moved for live Sky Sports broadcasting.

20 September 2025 9	Wycombe Wanderers	2–0	Northampton Town	High Wycombe
15:00 BST	Harvie 17'; Abbott 72'; Boyd-Munce (yellow card) 90+5'	Report	Fornah (yellow card) 56'	Stadium: Adams Park; Attendance: 5,197; Referee: Andrew Madley

27 September 2025 10	Northampton Town	2–0	Bolton Wanderers	Northampton
15:00 BST	S.Hoskins (yellow card) 45+1' (goal) 73'; C.McGeehan 70'; J.Wormleighton (yellow card) 78'	Report	C.Forino-Joseph (yellow card) 85'	Stadium: Sixfields Stadium; Attendance: 7,366 (1,450); Referee: Scott Oldham

4 October 2025 11	Port Vale	0–0	Northampton Town	Burslem
15:00 BST	J.Lawrence-Gabriel (yellow card) 24'; J.Headley (yellow card) 39'	Report	J.Thorniley (yellow card) 29'	Stadium: Vale Park; Attendance: 7,657 (682); Referee: Martin Woods

11 October 2025 12	Northampton Town	1–2	Rotherham United	Northampton
14:00 BST	C.McCarthy (yellow card) 38'; S.Hoskins 26' (pen.) (yellow card) 58'	Report	J.Baptiste (yellow card) 35'; Z.Jules (yellow card) 45+3'; J.Rafferty 71'; J.Benson 87'	Stadium: Sixfields Stadium; Attendance: 6,458 (596); Referee: Paul Tierney
Note: Fixture was initially scheduled for a 15:00 kick-off, but was brought forward an hour to avoid a clash with a Northampton Saints fixture.

18 October 2025 13	Doncaster Rovers	1–2	Northampton Town	Doncaster
15:00 BST	B.Close 36'; G.Middleton (yellow card) 55'	Report	E.Wheatley 47'; S.Hoskins 67' (pen.); Fornah (yellow card) 81'	Stadium: Eco-Power Stadium; Attendance: 8,113; Referee: John Busby

21 October 2025 7	Reading	1–0	Northampton Town	Reading
20:00 BST	D.Williams (yellow card) 55'; K.Ehibhatiomhan 65'; M.Jacob (yellow card) 87'; D.Kyerewaa (yellow card) 90+2'	Report		Stadium: Madejski Stadium; Attendance: 9,228 (382); Referee: Abigail Byrne
Note: Fixture was originally scheduled for 6 September, but was postponed due to international call-ups.

25 October 2025 14	Northampton Town	0–1	Luton Town	Northampton
15:00 BST	J.Perkins (yellow card) 13'; K.Swyer (yellow card) 45+1'	Report	L.Fanne (yellow card) 40' (goal) 77'; K.Naismith (yellow card) 52'	Stadium: Sixfields Stadium; Attendance: 8,029 (1,551); Referee: Matthew Corlett

8 November 2025 15	Northampton Town	2–1	Mansfield Town	Northampton
12:30 GMT	J.Perkins 53'; T.Eaves 74' (pen.); J.Thorniley (yellow card) 83'	Report	R.Oates 18'	Stadium: Sixfields; Attendance: 6,849 (1,471); Referee: Elliot Bell
Note: Fixture was initially scheduled for a 15:00 kick-off, but was moved for live Sky Sports broadcasting.

22 November 2025 17	Northampton Town	1–3	Cardiff City	Sixfields
15:00 GMT	E.Wheatley 57'	Report	J.Colwill 7' (yellow card) 55'; W.Fish (yellow card) 19'; E.Wheatley 60' (o.g.); C.Willock 90+3'	Stadium: Sixfields Stadium; Attendance: 7,151 (1,525); Referee: Neil Hair

29 November 2025 18	Plymouth Argyle	0–3	Northampton Town	Plymouth
15:00 GMT	M.Ross (yellow card) 45+1'; L.Tolaj (red card) 65'	Report	J.Thorniley (yellow card) 5'; E.Wheatley (yellow card) 45+1'; C.McCarthy (yellow card) 53'; T.Eaves 58'; T.Taylor (yellow card) 69'; E.List 76'; J.Willis 80'; M.Forbes (yellow card) 90+4'	Stadium: Home Park; Attendance: 15,419 (618); Referee: Stephen Parkinson

9 December 2025 19	Northampton Town	1–1	Huddersfield Town	Northampton
19:45 GMT	N.Guinness-Walker 9'	Report	L.Castledine 36'	Stadium: Sixfields Stadium; Attendance: 5,584 (386); Referee: James Durkin

13 December 2025 20	Peterborough United	2–1	Northampton Town	Peterborough
15:00 GMT	H.Leonard 45+1', 48' (yellow card) 89'; P.Kioso (yellow card) 52'; M.Garbett (yellow card) 90+3'	Report	J.Perkins (red card) 10'; T.Eaves 69'	Stadium: London Road Stadium; Attendance: 9,260 (1,626); Referee: John Busby

19 December 2025 21	Northampton Town	3–1	AFC Wimbledon	Northampton
19:45 GMT	C.McCarthy 10'; J.Thorniley (yellow card) 26'; C.McGeehan 50' 59'; S.Hoskins (yellow card) 76'	Report	M.Browne 16'; N.Asiimwe (yellow card) 47'; J.Reeves (yellow card) 85'	Stadium: Sixfields Stadium; Attendance: 6,525 (723); Referee: Carl Brook
Note: Fixture was initially scheduled for 20 December, but was rescheduled to avoid a clash with Northampton Saints.

26 December 2025 22	Burton Albion	5–1	Northampton Town	Burton upon Trent
15:00 GMT	J.Beesley 3' (pen.); J.Armer 23'; M.Dyche 28' (o.g.); T.Shade 44', 84'; D.Williams (yellow card) 56'; T.Vancooten (yellow card) 59'; G.Evans (yellow card) 77'	Report	T.Eaves 39'; E.Wheatley (yellow card) 51'; J.Burroughs (yellow card) 75'	Stadium: Pirelli Stadium; Attendance: 4,704; Referee: Sam Mulhall

29 December 2025 23	Huddersfield Town	2–0	Northampton Town	Huddersfield
19:45 GMT	J.Low 45+5'; B.Radulović 83'	Report	R.Fitzsimons (yellow card) 40'; D.Campbell (yellow card) 45+8'; T.Taylor (yellow card) 62'	Stadium: Kirklees Stadium; Attendance: 16,639; Referee: Will Finnie

1 January 2026 24	Northampton Town	0–0	Stockport County	Northampton
15:00 GMT	T.Taylor (yellow card) 81'	Report	E.Pye (yellow card) 10'; J.Fevrier (yellow card) 53'; O.Norwood (yellow card) 90'	Stadium: Sixfields Stadium; Attendance: 7,050 (838); Referee: Darren Drysdale

4 January 2026 25	Bolton Wanderers	0–0	Northampton Town	Horwich
12:00 GMT		Report		Stadium: Toughsheet Community Stadium; Attendance: 20,333; Referee: Alex Chilowicz
Note: Fixture was initially scheduled for a 15:00 kick-off, but was moved for live Sky Sports broadcasting.

17 January 2026 27	Northampton Town	1–2	Wycombe Wanderers	Northampton
15:00 GMT	J.Wormleighton (yellow card) 20'; J.Guthrie 36'; T.Taylor (yellow card) 58'	Report	T.Allen (yellow card) 5'; F.Onyedinma 17', 64'; C.Woodrow (yellow card) 58'; D.Harvie (yellow card) 89'	Stadium: Sixfields Stadium; Attendance: 6,756 (838); Referee: Lee Swabey

24 January 2026 28	Blackpool	2–0	Northampton Town	Blackpool
15:00 GMT	Z.Ashworth 3'; A.Fletcher 50' (pen.); M.Obafemi (yellow card) 66'	Report	T.Taylor (yellow card) 48'	Stadium: Bloomfield Road; Attendance: 10,099; Referee: Peter Wright

27 January 2026 29	Rotherham United	2–1	Northampton Town	Rotherham
19:45 GMT	S.Nombe (yellow card) 28'; H.Gray (yellow card) 46', (goal) 58'; E.Adegboyega 84'; J.Rafferty (yellow card) 90+2'	Report	T.Eaves 26'	Stadium: New York Stadium; Attendance: 7,228 (293); Referee: Alan Young

31 January 2026 30	Northampton Town	0–2	Reading	Northampton
14:00 GMT	E.Moore (yellow card) 57'; C.McGeehan (yellow card) 67'	Report	C.Savage (yellow card) 52'; J.Marriott 55'; W.Keane 58'; A.Yiadom (yellow card) 90+2'; H.Roberts (yellow card) 90+4'	Stadium: Sixfields Stadium; Attendance: 7,038 (1,525); Referee: Jamie O'Connor
Note: Fixture was initially scheduled for a 15:00 kick-off, but was brought forward an hour to avoid a clash with Northampton Saints also being at home.

3 February 2026 16	Barnsley	2–2	Northampton Town	Barnsley
19:45 GMT	J.Shepherd (yellow card) 4'; D.McGoldrick 30'; A.Phillips 62'; P.Kelly (yellow card) 90+5'	Report	N.Guinness-Walker 3'; C.McGeehan (yellow card) 58'; M.Dyche 71'	Stadium: Oakwell; Attendance: 8,806 (247); Referee: Thomas Parsons
Note: Fixture was originally scheduled for 15 November, but was postponed due to international call-ups.

7 February 2026 31	Northampton Town	3–1	Stevenage	Northampton
15:00 GMT	M.Forbes 27'; T.Eaves (penalty missed) 45+3' 45+3'; M.Dyche (yellow card) 61'; E.Moore (yellow card) 74'; R.Fitzsimons (yellow card) 77'; S.Hoskins (yellow card) 88' (goal) 90'	Report	J.Reid 37' (yellow card) 45+3'; C.Goode (yellow card) 45+2'; D.Sweeney (yellow card) 71'	Stadium: Sixfields Stadium; Attendance: 6,344 (485); Referee: Ollie Yates

14 February 2026 32	Exeter City	0–0	Northampton Town	Exeter
15:00 GMT		Report	D.Campbell (yellow card) 68'	Stadium: St James Park; Attendance: 6,310 (350); Referee: Oliver Mackey

17 February 2026 33	Lincoln City	4–0	Northampton Town	Lincoln
19:45 GMT	R.Oné 11'; T.Darikwa (yellow card) 30'; J.Moylan 51'; I.Varfolomeyev 72'; R.Street 75'	Report	J.Vale (red card) 56'; J.Perkins (yellow card) 79'	Stadium: Sincil Bank; Attendance: 9,242 (432); Referee: Kirsty Dowle

21 February 2026 34	Northampton Town	1–2	Leyton Orient	Northampton
15:00 GMT	Eaves 60'; Guinness-Walker (yellow card) 65'	Report	Ballard 10'; Craig (yellow card) 45'; Morris 47'; Dennis (yellow card) 72'	Stadium: Sixfields Stadium; Attendance: 6,441 (711 away fans); Referee: Edward Duckworth

24 February 2026 26	Northampton Town	0–1	Port Vale	Northampton
19:45 GMT	Burroughs (yellow card) 28'	Report	Stockley 45+8'	Stadium: Sixfields Stadium; Attendance: 5,335 (227 away fans); Referee: Charles Breakspear
Note: Fixture was originally scheduled for 10 January, but was postponed due to Port Vale's continued involvement in the FA Cup.

28 February 2026 35	Northampton Town	1–1	Peterborough United	Northampton
12:30 GMT	Evans (yellow card) 41'; Eaves 44'	Report	Morgan 52', (yellow card) 64'; Frith (yellow card) 60'	Stadium: Sixfields Stadium; Attendance: 7,637 (1,524 away fans); Referee: David Rock
Note: Fixture was initially scheduled for a 15:00 kick-off, but was rescheduled for live Sky Sports broadcasting.

8 March 2026 36	AFC Wimbledon	1–0	Northampton Town	Wimbledon, London
12:00 GMT	Maycock 10'	Report	Dyche (yellow card) 80'	Stadium: Plough Lane; Attendance: 8,142 (728 Cobblers fans); Referee: Elliot Bell
Note: Fixture was initially scheduled for a 15:00 kick-off, but was moved for live Sky Sports broadcasting.

14 March 2026 37	Northampton Town	0–2	Burton Albion	Northampton
15:00 GMT	Taylor (yellow card) 13'; McGeehan (yellow card) 20'	Report	Beesley 32'; Collins (yellow card) 70'; Chauke (yellow card) 86'; Lofthouse 89'	Stadium: Sixfields Stadium; Attendance: 6,450 (433 away fans); Referee: Lee Swabey

17 March 2026 38	Stockport County	2–1	Northampton Town	Edgeley
19:45 GMT	Stokes 2'; Olaofe (yellow card) 11'; Wootton 58'	Report	McGeehan 42'; Hoskins (yellow card) 74'	Stadium: Edgeley Park; Attendance: 8,085; Referee: Scott Oldham

21 March 2026 39	Mansfield Town	4–1	Northampton Town	Mansfield
15:00 GMT	Evans 5', 48'; Oshilaja (yellow card) 57'; Akins 62', 90+3'	Report	Perkins (yellow card) 11'; Willis (yellow card) 24'; Taylor (yellow card) 34'; McGeehan 73'	Stadium: Field Mill; Attendance: 7,624 (378 Cobblers fans); Referee: Matt Corlett

3 April 2026 41	Bradford City	1–0	Northampton Town	Bradford
15:00 BST	Humphrys 14'; Metcalfe (yellow card) 55'; Power (yellow card) 86'; Pennington (yellow card) 90'	Report	Moore (yellow card) 77'	Stadium: Valley Parade; Attendance: 19,105 (412 Cobblers fans); Referee: Martin Coy

6 April 2026 42	Northampton Town	1–3	Wigan Athletic	Northampton
15:00 BST	Evans 80'	Report	Carragher (yellow card) 14'; Wright 15'; Guthrie 45' (o.g.); Aimson 88'	Stadium: Sixfields Stadium; Attendance: 6,148 (703 away fans); Referee: Alex Chilowicz

15 April 2026 43	Luton Town	2–1	Northampton Town	Luton
19:45 BST	Walsh 43'; Naismith 85'; Lonwijk (yellow card) 90+1'; Keeley (yellow card) 90+4'	Report	Hoskins 31'; McGeehan (yellow card) 62'; McCarthy (yellow card) 76'; Guthrie (yellow card) 77'	Stadium: Kenilworth Road; Attendance: 9,636 (370 Cobblers fans); Referee: James Durkin
Note: Fixture was initially scheduled for 15 April but was rearranged due to the 2026 EFL Trophy final.

18 April 2026 44	Northampton Town	1–3	Doncaster Rovers	Northampton
15:00 BST	Burroughs (yellow card) 45'; Campbell (yellow card) 59'; Guinness-Walker (yellow card) 69'; Evans (yellow card) 86'; List (yellow card) 90+1'; McGeehan 90+6'	Report	Lee 50'; Adelakun 57'; Lo-Tutala (yellow card) 69'; Broadbent 90+3'; Gotts (yellow card) 90+5'	Stadium: Sixfields Stadium; Attendance: 6,454 (966 away fans); Referee: Dale Baines

25 April 2026 45	Cardiff City	5–1	Northampton Town	Leckwith
15:00 BST	Tanner 9', 54'; Colwill 19'; Robinson 37'; Robertson (yellow card) 74'; Salech 85'	Report	Hoskins (yellow card) 42'; Evans 68'	Stadium: Cardiff City Stadium; Attendance: 23,223; Referee: Ed Duckworth

28 April 2026 40	Northampton Town	0–1	Barnsley	Northampton
15:00 GMT	List (yellow card) 87'	Report	Cleary 37'; O'Keeffe (yellow card) 55'	Stadium: Sixfields Stadium; Attendance: 5,143 (260 away fans); Referee: Jamie O'Connor
Note: Fixture was initially scheduled for 28 March, but was rearranged due to international call-ups.

2 May 2026 46	Northampton Town	2–3	Plymouth Argyle	Northampton
15:00 BST	List 13', (yellow card) 64'; Jacobs 18'; McCarthy (yellow card) 45+1' (yellow-red card) 62'; Evans (yellow card) 84'	Report	Tolaj 28'; Dale (yellow card) 34'; Boateng 40', (yellow card) 66'; Ross (yellow card) 59'; Wiredu 74'; Curtis (yellow card) 79'	Stadium: Sixfields Stadium; Attendance: 7,131 (1,531 away supporters); Referee: Benjamin Speedie

=== FA Cup ===
Northampton were drawn away to Oldham Athletic in the first round.

1 November 2025 First round	Oldham Athletic	3–1	Northampton Town	Oldham
15:00 GMT	M.Mellon 3', 4', 50'; J.Garner (yellow card) 71'	Report	J.Thorniley (yellow card) 80'; C.McGeehan 90+1'; E.List (yellow card) 90+10'	Stadium: Boundary Park; Attendance: 3,693 (515); Referee: Peter Wright

=== EFL Cup ===
On 26 June, the draw for the first round was made, with Northampton being drawn at home against Southampton.

12 August 2025 First round	Northampton Town	0–1	Southampton	Northampton
19:45 BST	C.McGeehan (yellow card) 56'; J.Wormleighton (yellow card) 69'; J.Perkins (yellow card) 89'	Report	R.Edwards (yellow card) 11'; M.Fernandes 48' (yellow card) 56'; T.Harwood-Bellis (yellow card) 57'; F.Downes (yellow card) 86'	Stadium: Sixfields; Attendance: 4,381 (1,520); Referee: David Rock

=== EFL Trophy ===
In the group stage, Northampton were drawn into Southern Group C alongside Shrewsbury Town, Walsall and Chelsea U21. After winning the group, Town were drawn at home to Wycombe Wanderers in the round of 32, to Walsall in the round of 16, away to AFC Wimbledon in the quarter-finals and away to either Luton Town or Plymouth Argyle in the semi-finals.

==== Group stage ====
Pos	Div	Team	Pld	W	PW	PL	L	GF	GA	GD	Pts	Qualification
1	L1	Northampton Town	3	3	0	0	0	6	1	+5	9	Advance to Round 2
2	L2	Walsall	3	1	1	0	1	3	2	+1	5	Advance to Round 2
3	L2	Shrewsbury Town	3	1	0	0	2	5	6	−1	3	
4	ACA	Chelsea U21	3	0	0	1	2	1	6	−5	1	

Source: EFL

23 September 2025 South Group C	Northampton Town	3–0	Chelsea U21	Northampton
19:00 BST	K.Swyer 19'; M.Jacobs 23'; E.List 28' (pen.)	Report		Stadium: Sixfields Stadium; Attendance: 1,341 (138); Referee: Darren Drysdale

7 October 2025 South Group C	Walsall	0–1	Northampton Town	Bescot
19:00 BST	S.Hornby (yellow card) 78'; R.Maher (yellow card) 82'	Report	C.McCarthy (yellow card) 53'; K.Swyer 88'	Stadium: Bescot Stadium; Attendance: 1,907; Referee: Richard Eley

11 November 2025 South Group C	Northampton Town	2–1	Shrewsbury Town	Northampton
19:00 GMT	K.Swyer (yellow card) 27' (goal) 29'; T.Taylor (yellow card) 75'; C.McCarthy 78'; T.Eaves (yellow card) 83'	Report	T.Anderson (yellow card) 23'; M.Benning (yellow card) 45+1'	Stadium: Sixfields Stadium; Attendance: 802 (85); Referee: Wayne Cartmel

==== Knockout stages ====
2 December 2025 Round of 32	Northampton Town	2–0	Wycombe Wanderers	Northampton
19:00 GMT	K.Edwards 26'; T.Fornah 40'; M.Dyche (yellow card) 65'; T.Taylor (yellow card) 81'	Report	D.McNeilly (yellow card) 57'	Stadium: Sixfields Stadium; Attendance: 1,022 (131); Referee: Isaac Searle

14 January 2026 Round of 16	Northampton Town	4–2	Walsall	Northampton
19:00 GMT	K.Swyer 18', 48'; S.Hoskins 62'; M.Jacobs (yellow card) 23'; T.Eaves 90+2'	Report	A.Adomah 5'; M.Hancock (yellow card) 24'; J.Hollman (yellow card) 55'; D.Kanu 75'	Stadium: Sixfields Stadium; Attendance: 1,406 (217); Referee: Abigail Byrne

10 February 2026 Quarter-finals	AFC Wimbledon	1–2	Northampton Town	Wimbledon, London
19:00 GMT	M.Stevens 50'	Report	J.Vale 38'; K.McAdam (yellow card) 75'; T.Eaves 73' (yellow card) 90'	Stadium: Plough Lane; Attendance: 1,752 (319); Referee: Paul Howard

4 March 2026 Semi-finals	Luton Town	2–1	Northampton Town	Luton
19:30 GMT	Naismith (yellow card) 16'; Wells 53', (yellow card) 60'; Clark (yellow card) 79'; Walsh 82'	Report	McAdam 17'	Stadium: Kenilworth Road; Attendance: 10,280 (1,311 away fans); Referee: Tom Reeves
Note: Live on Sky Sports

=== Appearances, goals and discipline ===
No.	Pos	Player	League One			FA Cup			EFL Cup			EFL Trophy			Total			Discipline	
No.	Pos	Player	Starts	Sub	Goals	Starts	Sub	Goals	Starts	Sub	Goals	Starts	Sub	Goals	Starts	Sub	Goals	Yellow card	Red card
1	GK	Lee Burge	20	–	–	–	–	–	–	–	–	4	–	–	24	–	–	–	–
2	RB	Jack Burroughs	19	8	–	–	–	–	–	1	–	4	1	–	23	10	–	3	–
3	CB	Conor McCarthy	26	4	1	–	–	–	1	–	–	4	2	1	31	6	2	6	1
4	CM	Dean Campbell	40	2	–	–	–	–	1	–	–	2	3	–	43	5	–	3	–
5	CB	Jon Guthrie	14	3	1	–	–	–	–	–	–	–	2	–	14	5	1	1	–
6	CB	Jordan Willis	8	8	1	1	–	–	1	–	–	6	–	–	16	8	1	1	–
7	W	Sam Hoskins	33	9	6	–	–	–	1	–	–	1	4	1	35	13	7	5	–
8	CM	Cameron McGeehan	32	2	7	1	–	1	1	–	–	1	3	–	33	5	8	6	–
9	ST	Tom Eaves	18	14	8	–	1	–	–	–	–	–	4	2	18	19	10	–	–
10	W	Elliott List	12	20	2	–	1	–	1	–	–	4	1	1	17	22	3	4	–
11	W	Kamarai Swyer	11	23	–	–	1	–	–	–	–	6	1	5	17	25	5	1	–
12	LB	Nesta Guinness-Walker	33	6	2	1	–	–	–	–	–	1	2	–	35	8	2	2	–
14	CM	Tyrese Fornah	27	6	–	–	1	–	1	–	–	5	1	1	33	8	1	4	–
15	CF	Jake Evans	7	9	2	–	–	–	–	–	–	1	1	–	8	10	2	2	–
16	RB	Joe Wormleighton	8	7	–	–	–	–	1	–	–	3	–	–	12	7	–	3	–
17	AM	Michael Jacobs	7	12	1	1	–	–	–	–	–	6	1	1	14	13	2	–	–
18	CB	Michael Forbes	19	3	2	1	–	–	–	1	–	1	1	–	21	5	2	1	–
21	CM	Jack Perkins	21	9	1	1	–	–	1	–	–	4	1	–	27	10	1	5	1
22	W	Kyle Edwards	3	10	–	1	–	–	–	–	–	2	1	1	6	11	1	–	–
23	CM	Terry Taylor	38	4	–	1	–	–	–	1	–	4	1	–	43	6	–	7	–
24	CB	Elliott Moore	12	1	–	–	–	–	–	–	–	–	–	–	12	1	–	3	–
26	LM	Kyle McAdam	5	3	–	–	–	–	–	–	–	2	–	1	7	3	1	–	–
27	ST	Jack Vale	9	11	–	–	–	–	–	–	–	5	–	1	14	11	1	–	1
28	CM	Ben Hammond	–	–	–	–	–	–	–	–	–	–	1	–	–	1	–	–	–
34	GK	Ross Fitzsimons	26	–	–	1	–	–	1	–	–	3	–	–	31	–	–	2	–
35	CB	Max Dyche	22	15	2	–	–	–	1	–	–	4	1	–	27	16	2	3	–
40	CF	Neo Dobson	–	1	–	–	–	–	–	–	–	–	–	–	–	1	–	–	–
Player(s) who featured whilst on loan but returned to parent club during the season:
15	CB	Jordan Thorniley	16	2	–	1	–	–	–	–	–	3	–	–	20	2	–	6	–
19	ST	Ethan Wheatley	20	2	3	1	–	–	–	1	–	1	–	–	22	3	3	3	–

== Transfers and contracts ==
=== Transfers in ===
Date from	Position	Nationality	Name	From	Fee	Ref.
1 June 2025 (Note: The transfer was announced on 19 May, and would become official on June 1 once the transfer window had reopened)	CM	(England)	Jack Perkins	(England) Nottingham Forest	Undisclosed	
1 July 2025 (Note: The transfer was announced on 29 May, and would become official on July 1 once his contract at Coventry had ended)	RB	(Scotland)	Jack Burroughs	(England) Coventry City	Free	
1 July 2025 (Note: The transfer was announced on 30 May, and would become official on July 1 once his contract at West Ham United had ended)	RW	(England)	Kamarai Swyer	(England) West Ham United	Free	
1 July 2025 (Note: The transfer was announced on 9 June, and would become official on July 1 once his contract at Scunthorpe had ended)	GK	(England)	Ross Fitzsimons	(England) Scunthorpe United	Free	
1 July 2025 (Note: The transfer was announced on 16 June, and would become official on July 1 once his contract at Chesterfield had ended)	AM	(England)	Michael Jacobs	(England) Chesterfield	Free	
1 July 2025 (Note: The transfer was announced on 19 June, and would become official on July 1 once his contract at Barrow had ended)	DM	(Scotland)	Dean Campbell	(England) Barrow	Free	
1 July 2025 (Note: The transfer was announced on 19 June, and would become official on July 1 once his contract at Stevenage had ended)	LW	(England)	Elliott List	(England) Stevenage	Free	
1 July 2025 (Note: The transfer was announced on 23 June, and would become official on July 1 once his contract at Barnsley had ended)	CB	(Republic of Ireland)	Conor McCarthy	(England) Barnsley	Free	
1 July 2025 (Note: The transfer was announced on 25 June, and would become official on July 1 once his contract at Derby County had ended)	DM	(Sierra Leone)	Tyrese Fornah	(England) Derby County	Free	
11 July 2025	RB	(England)	Joe Wormleighton	(England) Leicester City	Free	
1 September 2025	LW	(England)	Kyle Edwards	(England) Stevenage	Free	
2 September 2025	GK	(Republic of Ireland)	Theo Avery	(England) Nottingham Forest	Free	
18 September 2025	CF	(Wales)	Jack Vale	(England) Blackburn Rovers	Free	
10 January 2026	CB	(England)	Elliott Moore	(England) Oxford United	Free	

=== Loans in ===
Date from	Position	Nationality	Name	Loaned from	On loan until	Ref.
17 July 2025	CB	(England)	Jordan Thorniley	(England) Oxford United	5 January 2026 (Note: On 5 January, Thorniley was recalled to Oxford to continue his rehabilitation from injury)	
25 July 2025	CB	(Northern Ireland)	Michael Forbes	(England) West Ham United	31 May 2026	
1 August 2025	CF	(England)	Ethan Wheatley	(England) Manchester United	12 January 2026 (Note: On 12 January, Wheatley was recalled from his initial season-long loan from Manchester United)	
11 August 2025	CDM	(Wales)	Terry Taylor	(England) Charlton Athletic	31 May 2026	
27 January 2026	CF	(England)	Jake Evans	(England) Leicester City	31 May 2026	
2 February 2026	CM	(Wales)	Ben Hammond	(England) Nottingham Forest	31 May 2026	
2 February 2026	LWB	(England)	Kyle McAdam	(England) Nottingham Forest	31 May 2026	

=== Transfers out ===
Date from	Position	Nationality	Name	To	Fee	Ref.
1 July 2025 (Note: The transfer was announced on 6 June, and would become official on 1 July once his contract at the club expired)	LM	(England)	Mitch Pinnock	(England) Bromley	Rejected contract	
10 October 2025	RB	(England)	Aaron McGowan	(England) Tranmere Rovers	Rejected contract	
7 August 2025	CB	(England)	Jack Baldwin	(England) Colchester United	Free	

=== Loans out ===
Date from	Position	Nationality	Name	Loaned to	On loan until	Ref.
2 August 2025	CF	(England)	Neo Dobson	(England) St Ives Town	Work Experience	
9 August 2025	GK	(England)	James Dadge	(England) Spalding United	Work Experience	
9 August 2025	CB	(England)	Josh Tomlinson	(England) Bedford Town	Work Experience	
30 August 2025	LB	(Scotland)	Matthew Ireland	(England) Corby Town	Work Experience	
18 October 2025	CAM	(England)	Joziah Barnett	(England) Redditch United	Work Experience	
9 December 2025	CB	(England)	Josh Tomlinson	(England) Leamington	6 January 2026	
9 January 2026	GK	(Republic of Ireland)	Theo Avery	(England) Corby Town	7 February 2026	

=== Released ===
Date from	Position	Nationality	Name	Subsequent club	Join date	Ref.
30 June 2025	LB	(England)	Patrick Brough	(England) Tranmere Rovers	1 July 2025	
30 June 2025	CM	(Republic of the Congo)	Will Hondermarck	(England) Bromley	1 July 2025	
30 June 2025	GK	(New Zealand)	Nik Tzanev	(Wales) Newport County	1 July 2025	
30 June 2025	CM	(England)	Reuben Wyatt	(England) Tamworth	1 July 2025	
30 June 2025	RB	(England)	Harvey Lintott	(England) Eastbourne Borough	4 July 2025	
30 June 2025	CB	(England)	Timothy Eyoma	(Belgium) Lommel	18 July 2025	
30 June 2025	RB	(England)	Akin Odimayo	(Wales) Newport County	24 October 2025	
30 June 2025	CB	(England)	Tyler Magloire	(England) Workington	8 November 2025	
30 June 2025	LW	(Ghana)	Tariqe Fosu	Unattached		
30 June 2025	LB	(England)	Ali Koiki	Unattached		
30 June 2025	LM	(Scotland)	Liam McCarron	Unattached		
30 June 2025	CM	(England)	Jack Sowerby	Unattached		
30 June 2025	FW	(England)	James Wilson	Unattached		

=== New contract ===
Date from	Position	Nationality	Name	Length	End date	Ref.
15 May 2025	CB	(England)	Jon Guthrie	1 year +	30 June 2026	
29 May 2025	CB	(England)	Josh Tomlinson	1 year +	30 June 2026	
23 June 2025	CB	(England)	Max Dyche	2 years	30 June 2027	
3 January 2026	LW	(England)	Kyle Edwards	6 months	30 June 2026	
9 January 2026	GK	(England)	Ross Fitzsimons	1 year +	30 June 2027 (Note: Option for a further year)	
