= Tyrese Fornah =

Sierra Leonean footballer (born 1999)

Personal information
- Full name: Tyrese Momodu Fornah
- Date of birth: 11 September 1999 (age 27)
- Place of birth: Canning Town, England
- Height: 1.85 m (6 ft 1 in)
- Position: Defensive midfielder

Team information
- Current team: Northampton Town
- Number: 14

Youth career
- 2012–2018: Reading
- 2018: Brighton & Hove Albion
- 2018–2020: Nottingham Forest

Senior career*
Years	Team	Apps	(Gls)
2020–2023	Nottingham Forest	1	(0)
2020	→ Casa Pia (loan)	5	(0)
2020–2021	→ Plymouth Argyle (loan)	39	(0)
2022	→ Shrewsbury Town (loan)	19	(0)
2022–2023	→ Reading (loan)	35	(2)
2023–2025	Derby County	20	(0)
2024–2025	→ Salford City (loan)	40	(1)
2025–	Northampton Town	33	(0)

International career^{‡}
2023–	Sierra Leone	8	(0)
- * Club domestic league appearances and goals as of 28 April 2026 (UTC) ‡ National team caps and goals as of 22:34, 15 November 2023 (UTC)

Tyrese Momodu Fornah (born 11 September 1999) is a professional footballer who plays as a defensive midfielder for EFL League Two club Northampton Town. Born in England, he plays for the Sierra Leone national team.

Fornah graduated for the academy at Nottingham Forest, but struggled to break into the first team and had loan spells at Casa Pia, Plymouth Argyle, Shrewsbury Town and Reading. In August 2023, Fornah left Forest to join local rivals Derby County in a rare direct transfer between clubs. A year later, he joined Salford City on a season-long loan; Fornah was released by Derby in June 2025.

== Club career ==
=== Nottingham Forest ===
Fornah was a member of the Nottingham Forest academy, having joined following his release from Brighton & Hove Albion in the summer of 2018. He signed a contract with Forest on 11 December 2019 that would keep him at the club until the summer of 2022.

Fornah made his professional debut on 5 January 2020, appearing as a 69th-minute substitute during a 3rd round FA Cup game against Chelsea.

On 31 January 2020, Fornah moved on loan to Portuguese LigaPro side Casa Pia for the remainder of the season, making five appearances.

He signed for League One side Plymouth Argyle on 2 October 2020 on a season-long loan.

On 18 January 2022, Fornah joined League One side Shrewsbury Town on loan until the end of the season.

On 8 July 2022, it was announced that Fornah had signed on a season-long loan with Championship side Reading. Despite an extended period of limited playing time, Fornah expressed an interest in signing permanently for the Royals.

=== Derby County ===
On 25 August 2023, Fornah joined EFL League One club Derby County on a two-year contract for an undisclosed fee. A day later, Fornah made his debut in Derby's 4–2 win at Peterborough United, as a 81st minute substitute for Conor Hourihane. Fornah started his career at Derby well, with his composure on the ball and aggression off it winning over fans, Fornah himself stated that he had settled in to life at Derby well. In the second half the season, Fornah would struggle for game time to a decline in performances and injuries. Fornah made 23 appearances during his first season at Derby, as the club secured automatic promotion to the Championship by finishing runners-up in League One.

Fornah featured in Derby's first match of the 2024–25 season, as an 86th minute substitute against Blackburn Rovers on 9 August 2024. On 14 August 2024, Fornah would join League Two club Salford City on a season-long loan. On 26 December 2024, Fornah scored his first goal for Salford City in a 3–0 win after Barrow, a game where he was also sent off for two bookable offences. He played 43 times for Salford during his loan spell, scoring once as Salford missed out on a place in the League Two play-offs by one point and place.

On 16 May 2025, it was announced that Fornah's contract at Derby would not be renewed upon expiry in June 2025; he played 24 times for Derby County over two seasons.

=== Northampton Town ===
On 26 June 2025, Fornah joined EFL League One club Northampton Town on a three-year contract.

== International career ==
In November 2023, Fornah received his first call-up to the Sierra Leone national team for World Cup Qualifiers against Ethiopia and Egypt.

== Personal life ==
Born in England, Fornah is of Ghanaian and Sierra Leonean descent.

== Career statistics ==
=== Club ===
As of match played 8 August 2026

Appearances and goals by club, season and competition
Club	Season	League			Cup		League Cup		Other		Total	
Club	Season	Division	Apps	Goals	Apps	Goals	Apps	Goals	Apps	Goals	Apps	Goals
Nottingham Forest	2019–20	Championship	0	0	1	0	0	0	—		1	0
Nottingham Forest	2020–21	Championship	0	0	0	0	0	0	—		0	0
Nottingham Forest	2021–22	Championship	1	0	0	0	2	0	—		3	0
Nottingham Forest	2022–23	Premier League	0	0	0	0	0	0	—		0	0
Nottingham Forest	Total		1	0	1	0	2	0	0	0	4	0
Casa Pia (loan)	2019–20	LigaPro	5	0	0	0	0	0	0	0	5	0
Plymouth Argyle (loan)	2020–21	League One	39	0	4	0	0	0	1 (Note: Appearance in the EFL Trophy)	0	44	0
Shrewsbury Town (loan)	2021–22	League One	17	0	0	0	0	0	—		17	0
Reading (loan)	2022–23	Championship	35	2	1	0	1	0	—		37	2
Derby County	2023–24	League One	19	0	0	0	0	0	4	0	23	0
Derby County	2024–25	Championship	1	0	0	0	0	0	—		1	0
Derby County	Total		20	0	0	0	0	0	4	0	24	0
Salford City (loan)	2024–25	League Two	40	1	3	0	—		0	0	43	1
Northampton Town	2025–26	League One	33	0	1	0	1	0	6	1	41	1
Northampton Town	2026–27	League Two	0	0	0	0	1	0	0	0	1	0
Northampton Town	Total		33	0	1	0	2	0	6	1	42	1
Career total			190	3	10	0	5	0	11	1	217	4

=== International ===
As of match played 16 October 2023

Appearances and goals by national team and year
National team	Year	Apps	Goals
Sierra Leone	2023	1	0
Total		1	0

== Honours ==
Derby County

- EFL League One second-place promotion: 2023–24
