= Ethan Wheatley =

English footballer (born 2006)

Personal information
- Full name: Ethan Joseph Wheatley
- Date of birth: 20 January 2006 (age 20)
- Place of birth: Stockport, England
- Height: 6 ft 2 in (1.87 m)
- Position: Forward

Team information
- Current team: Lincoln City (on loan from Manchester United)
- Number: 29

Youth career
- 2015–2024: Manchester United

Senior career*
Years	Team	Apps	(Gls)
2024–	Manchester United	3	(0)
2025	→ Walsall (loan)	4	(0)
2025–2026	→ Northampton Town (loan)	22	(3)
2026	→ Bradford City (loan)	12	(0)
2026–	→ Lincoln City (loan)	1	(0)

International career^{‡}
2022	England U17	1	(0)
2024	England U18	2	(3)
2024–2025	England U19	10	(3)
2025–	England U20	3	(0)
- * Club domestic league appearances and goals as of 17:06, 21 November 2026 (UTC) ‡ National team caps and goals as of 15:30, 15 November 2025 (UTC)

Ethan Joseph Wheatley (born 20 January 2006) is an English professional footballer who plays as a forward for EFL Championship club Lincoln City on loan from Premier League club Manchester United. He is an England youth international.

== Club career ==
=== Manchester United ===
Wheatley joined the Manchester United Academy at the age of nine and he signed a professional contract with the club in January 2024. Wheatley was included in a first-team matchday squad for the first time on 13 April 2024, for a Premier League game against AFC Bournemouth. He made his Premier League debut at the age of 18 on 24 April, against Sheffield United in a 4–2 victory, becoming the 250th academy graduate to make his debut for United's senior team.

==== Loan to Walsall ====
On 25 January 2025, Wheatley joined EFL League Two club Walsall on loan for the remainder of the season.

==== Loan to Northampton Town ====
On 1 August 2025, Wheatley joined EFL League One club Northampton Town on a season long loan. On 12 January 2026, Wheatley was recalled from his loan spell.

==== Loan to Bradford City ====
On 2 February 2026, fellow League One club Bradford City announced Wheatley had joined the club on loan until the end of the season.

==== Loan to Lincoln City ====
On 24 August 2026, Wheatley joined EFL Championship club Lincoln City on a season-long loan. He made his debut the following day in the EFL Cup second round, coming off the bench against Blackpool.

== International career ==
Wheatley has played youth international football for England at under-17, under-18, under-19 and under-20 levels.

In May 2024, he was called up to the England under-18 side. He made a goalscoring debut during a 4–2 win over Northern Ireland at St. George's Park.

On 7 September 2024, Wheatley made his England under-19 debut during a 1–1 draw away to Croatia. He was a member of England's squad at the 2025 UEFA European Under-19 Championship. During the tournament he scored goals in group stage games against Germany and Netherlands.

On 5 September 2025, Wheatley made his under-20 debut during a 2–1 defeat to Italy at the SMH Group Stadium.

== Career statistics ==
As of 21 November 2026

Appearances and goals by club, season and competition
Club	Season	League			FA Cup		EFL Cup		Europe		Other		Total	
Club	Season	Division	Apps	Goals	Apps	Goals	Apps	Goals	Apps	Goals	Apps	Goals	Apps	Goals
Manchester United U21	2023–24	—	—		—		—		—		2 (Note: Appearance(s) in EFL Trophy)	0	2	0
Manchester United U21	2024–25	—	—		—		—		—		2	0	2	0
Manchester United U21	Total		—		—		—		—		4	0	4	0
Manchester United	2023–24	Premier League	3	0	0	0	0	0	0	0	—		3	0
Manchester United	2024–25	Premier League	0	0	0	0	1	0	0	0	0	0	1	0
Manchester United	2025–26	Premier League	0	0	0	0	—		—		—		0	0
Manchester United	2026–27	Premier League	0	0	—		—		—		—		0	0
Manchester United	Total		3	0	0	0	1	0	0	0	0	0	4	0
Walsall (loan)	2024–25	League Two	4	0	—		—		—		—		4	0
Northampton Town (loan)	2025–26	League One	22	3	1	0	1	0	—		1	0	25	3
Bradford City (loan)	2025–26	League One	12	0	—		—		—		—		12	0
Lincoln City (loan)	2026–27	Championship	1	0	0	0	1	0	—		—		2	0
Career total			42	3	1	0	3	0	0	0	5	0	51	3

== Honours ==
Individual

- Jimmy Murphy Young Player of the Year: 2023–24
