= Matty Warhurst =

English footballer (born 2006)

Personal information
- Full name: Matthew Ethan Warhurst
- Date of birth: 25 September 2006 (age 20)
- Place of birth: Stalybridge, England
- Position: Forward

Team information
- Current team: Northampton Town
- Number: 9

Youth career
- –2019: Oldham Athletic
- 2019–2026: Manchester City

Senior career*
Years	Team	Apps	(Gls)
2026–	Northampton Town	12	(2)
- * Club domestic league appearances and goals as of 21:00, 24 October 2026 (UTC)

Matthew Ethan Warhurst (born 25 September 2006) is an English professional footballer who plays as a forward for EFL League Two club Northampton Town.

== Career ==
Warhurst was a member of the youth academy of Manchester City for seven years after joining from Oldham Athletic.

Northampton Town signed Warhurst for an undisclosed fee in the summer of 2026, agreeing a three-year contract.

== Career statistics ==
As of match played 24 October 2026

Appearances and goals by club, season and competition
Club	Season	League			FA Cup		EFL Cup		Other		Total	
Club	Season	Division	Apps	Goals	Apps	Goals	Apps	Goals	Apps	Goals	Apps	Goals
Manchester City U21	2023–24	—	—		—		—		1 (Note: Appearances in EFL Trophy)	0	1	0
Manchester City U21	2025–26	—	—		—		—		2	0	2	0
Manchester City U21	Total		0	0	0	0	0	0	3	0	3	0
Northampton Town	2026–27	League Two	11	2	0	0	1	0	1	1	13	3
Career Total			11	2	0	0	1	0	4	1	16	3
