= Joe Wormleighton =

English footballer (born 2003)

Personal information
- Full name: Joseph Oliver Wormleighton
- Date of birth: 30 December 2003 (age 22)
- Place of birth: Leicester, England
- Height: 5 ft 10 in (1.78 m)
- Position: Right-back

Team information
- Current team: Northampton Town
- Number: 16

Youth career
- –2022: Leicester City

Senior career*
Years	Team	Apps	(Gls)
2022–2025	Leicester City	0	(0)
2025–	Northampton Town	25	(0)
- * Club domestic league appearances and goals as of 24 October 2026 (UTC)

Joseph Oliver Wormleighton (born 30 December 2003) is an English professional footballer who plays as a right-back for EFL League Two club Northampton Town.

== Career ==
=== Leicester City ===
Having grew up in the nearby village of Whetstone, Wormleighton joined the Leicester City academy at a young age.

He made over 60 appearance in the Premier League 2 for Leicester, as well as an additional 6 in the EFL Trophy.

He was named on the bench for the club's Premier League match against Leeds United on 20 October 2022, although never made a first team appearance for the club.

=== Northampton Town ===
On 11 July 2025, Wormleighton signed for EFL League One club Northampton Town on a two-year contract. He made 19 appearances in his first season.

== Career statistics ==
As of match played 24 October 2026

Appearances and goals by club, season and competition
Club	Season	League			FA Cup		League Cup		Other		Total	
Club	Season	Division	Apps	Goals	Apps	Goals	Apps	Goals	Apps	Goals	Apps	Goals
Leicester City U21	2022–23	—	—		—		—		3 (Note: Appearance(s) in EFL Trophy)	0	3	0
Leicester City U21	2023–24	—	—		—		—		0	0	0	0
Leicester City U21	2024–25	—	—		—		—		3	0	3	0
Leicester City U21	Total		—		—		—		6	0	6	0
Northampton Town	2025–26	League One	15	0	0	0	1	0	3	0	19	0
Northampton Town	2026–27	League Two	10	0	0	0	1	0	2	0	13	0
Northampton Town	Total		25	0	0	0	2	0	5	0	32	0
Career total			25	0	0	0	2	0	11	0	38	0
