= Logan Briggs =

Footballer (born 2006)

Personal information
- Full name: Logan Hamilton Briggs
- Date of birth: 6 December 2005 (age 20)
- Place of birth: Northampton, England
- Position: Attacking midfielder

Team information
- Current team: Northampton Town (on loan from Leicester City)
- Number: 20

Youth career
- –2026: Leicester City

Senior career*
Years	Team	Apps	(Gls)
2026–	Leicester City	0	(0)
2026–	→ Northampton Town (loan)	8	(1)

International career^{‡}
2026–	Wales U21	1	(0)
- * Club domestic league appearances and goals as of 23:34, 10 November 2026 (UTC) ‡ National team caps and goals as of 12:57, 18 September 2026 (UTC)

Logan Hamilton Briggs (born 6 December 2005) is a professional footballer who plays as a midfielder for EFL League Two club Northampton Town, on loan from EFL League One club Leicester City. He is a Wales under-21 international.

== Club career ==
Born in Northampton, Briggs is a product of the Leicester City academy. He was named Academy Player of the Season at the club's end of season awards in 2024. He was also awarded Premier League scholar of the year in 2024, an award which honours players who excel in football while maintaining high academic standards.

On 2 July 2026, Briggs signed a new contract with Leicester and joined League Two club Northampton Town on a season-long loan. On 15 August 2026, he made his professional debut, starting in a 0–0 draw with Swindon Town in the league.

== International career ==
Born in England, Briggs has represented Wales at under-21 level.

== Career statistics ==
As of match played 10 November 2026

Appearances and goals by club, season and competition
Club	Season	League			FA Cup		EFL Cup		Other		Total	
Club	Season	Division	Apps	Goals	Apps	Goals	Apps	Goals	Apps	Goals	Apps	Goals
Leicester City U21	2024–25	—			—		—		1 (Note: Appearances in EFL Trophy)	0	1	0
Northampton Town	2026–27	League Two	8	1	1	0	0	0	2	0	11	1
Career Total			8	1	1	0	0	0	3	0	12	1
