= Elliott Moore =

English footballer (born 1997)

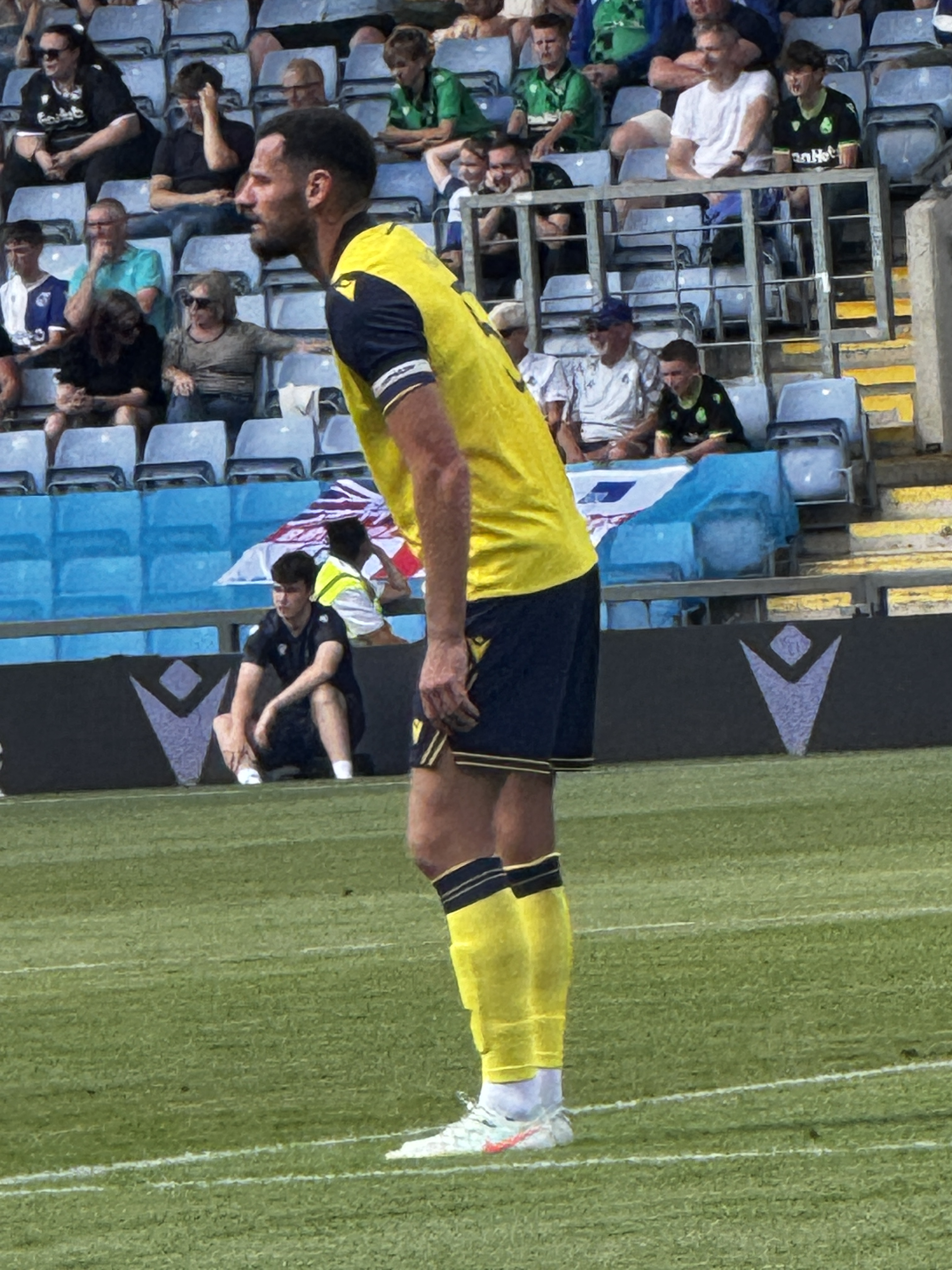
- Moore on 26 July 2025 at a home friendly against Bristol Rovers.

Personal information
- Full name: Elliott Jordan Moore
- Date of birth: 16 March 1997 (age 29)
- Place of birth: Coalville, England
- Height: 6 ft 5 in (1.96 m)
- Position: Centre back

Team information
- Current team: Northampton Town
- Number: 6

Youth career
- 2003–2017: Leicester City

Senior career*
Years	Team	Apps	(Gls)
2017–2019	Leicester City	0	(0)
2017–2019	→ OH Leuven (loan)	61	(7)
2019–2025	Oxford United	201	(10)
2026–	Northampton Town	27	(1)

International career
2015	England U18	1	(0)
2017	England U20	2	(0)
- * Club domestic league appearances and goals as of 22:01, 14 November 2026 (UTC)

Elliott Jordan Moore (born 16 March 1997) is an English professional footballer who plays as a defender for EFL League Two club Northampton Town.

== Club career ==
=== Leicester City ===
Born in Coalville, England, Moore began his career with Leicester City at the age of 6, training with the club's Academy Development Group before signing a contract with the club at the age of 8. He gained his scholarship at the age of 16 and helped the under-18s reach the semi-final of the FA Youth cup in 2014–15. That team included several players that went on to play in the Premier League with Leicester's first team – Ben Chilwell, Hamza Choudhary and Harvey Barnes. He made his under-21s debut at the age of 16 against Coalville Town in the Westerby Cup Winners' Cup final on 31 July 2013. Moore went on to make over 60 appearances for the club at under-21 and under-23 levels and captained the under-23 side during the 2016–17 season. His performance in the 2014–15 season earned him a nomination for Leicester's Academy Player of the Year award but he lost out to Ben Chilwell.

On 18 May 2017, Moore was called up to the first team but appeared as an unused substitute in the 6–1 defeat to Tottenham Hotspur in the last game of the season. He joined the first team's pre-season tour to Austria and Asia during the Summer of 2017 and made his first appearance on 19 July 2017. He came on as a half-time substitute in the Asia Trophy semi-final win over West Bromwich Albion in front of a crowd of 40,000.

In August 2017, Moore signed a new two-year contract, keeping him at the King Power Stadium until July 2019, and he signed another two-year contract until 2020 the following June.

=== OH Leuven (loan) ===
His new contract with Leicester City included a loan deal that saw him join OH Leuven, also owned by King Power.

Moore immediately featured in the starting lineup at OH Leuven one day after signing for the club, in a 7–1 victory over Cercle Brugge. Moore quickly established himself in the side following his debut. On 27 August 2017, he scored the 8th goal for OH Leuven and his first for the club in an 8–0 cup win against Turnhout. He scored his first league goal for the club on 8 September 2017, in a 2–0 win over Tubize, and scored again on 3 October 2017, in a 3–0 win over Cercle Brugge. He captained the side for the first time, following an injury to Dimitri Daeseleire, in a 2–2 draw against Cercle Brugge on 2 February 2018, and also captained the following match against Lierse on 11 February 2018 before suffering an injury. Moore returned from injury as captain on 1 April 2018, in a 2–2 draw against Zulte Waregem. As the 2017–18 season progressed, Moore featured as captain in a number of matches, though OH Leuven failed to return to the Belgian top flight. Moore finished his first season at OH Leuven having made 35 appearances and scored 3 times in all competitions.

Following the 2017–18 season, Moore rejoined Leuven on loan for a second season.

=== Oxford United ===
Moore signed a three-year deal with Oxford United on 1 August 2019 for an undisclosed fee. He made his debut two days later as a 94th-minute substitute in United's first league game of the 2019–20 season at Sunderland. On 7 June 2022, Moore signed a new three-year deal, keeping him at the club until 2025.

On 1 September 2025, he departed the club by mutual consent.

=== Northampton Town ===
Moore signed a deal lasting until June 2027 with Northampton Town on 10 January 2026.

== International career ==
In June 2015, Moore was called up for the England U18 squad and made his only appearance for the side, in a 2–1 defeat over Russia U18.

In June 2017, he was called up for the England U20 squad for the first time ahead of Toulon Tournament. He made his England U20 debut on 1 June 2017 as a 68th-minute substitute in a 7–1 win over Cuba. He made his full debut three days later in a 2–1 win over Japan. England went on to win the Tournament and Moore received his first medal at international level.

== Personal life ==
His father played football as a semi-professional.

== Career statistics ==
As of match played 14 November 2026

Appearances and goals by club, season and competition
Club	Season	League			National cup (Note: Includes FA Cup, Belgian Cup)		League cup (Note: Includes EFL Cup)		Other		Total	
Club	Season	Division	Apps	Goals	Apps	Goals	Apps	Goals	Apps	Goals	Apps	Goals
Leicester City U21	2016–17	—	—		—		—		2 (Note: Appearance(s) in EFL Trophy)	0	2	0
Leicester City	2017–18	Premier League	0	0	0	0	0	0	0	0	0	0
Leicester City	2018–19	Premier League	0	0	0	0	0	0	0	0	0	0
Leicester City	Total		0	0	0	0	0	0	0	0	0	0
OH Leuven	2017–18	Belgian First Division B	33	2	2	1	—		—		35	3
OH Leuven	2018–19	Belgian First Division B	28	5	1	0	—		—		29	5
OH Leuven	Total		61	7	3	1	0	0	0	0	64	8
Oxford United	2019–20	League One	20	1	5	0	5	1	5 (Note: Two appearances in EFL Trophy; three appearances in EFL League One play-offs)	0	35	2
Oxford United	2020–21	League One	46	5	1	0	2	0	5 (Note: Two appearances in EFL Trophy; two appearances in EFL League One play-offs)	0	54	5
Oxford United	2021–22	League One	31	1	2	0	1	0	1	0	35	1
Oxford United	2022–23	League One	37	1	3	0	1	0	1	0	42	1
Oxford United	2023–24	League One	39	1	2	0	1	0	4 (Note: One appearance in EFL Trophy; three appearances, one goal in EFL League One play-offs)	1	46	2
Oxford United	2024–25	Championship	26	1	0	0	1	0	0	0	27	1
Oxford United	2025–26	Championship	2	0	0	0	2	0	0	0	4	0
Oxford United	Total		201	10	13	0	13	1	16	1	243	12
Northampton Town	2025–26	League One	13	0	—		—		0	0	13	0
Northampton Town	2026–27	League Two	14	1	1	0	1	0	1	0	17	1
Northampton Town	Total		27	1	1	0	1	0	1	0	30	1
Career total			289	18	17	1	14	1	19	1	339	21

== Honours ==
Oxford United

- EFL League One play-offs: 2024
