= Max Dyche =

English footballer

Personal information
- Full name: Max Dyche
- Date of birth: 22 February 2003 (age 23)
- Place of birth: Northampton, England
- Height: 1.84 m (6 ft 0 in)
- Position: Defender

Team information
- Current team: Northampton Town
- Number: 35

Youth career
- –2020: Northampton Town

Senior career*
Years	Team	Apps	(Gls)
2020–	Northampton Town	87	(3)
2021	→ Kettering Town (loan)	7	(0)
2022	→ Brackley Town (loan)	6	(1)
2023	→ Aldershot Town (loan)	2	(0)
2024	→ Woking (loan)	9	(0)
2024–2025	→ Woking (loan)	21	(2)
- * Club domestic league appearances and goals as of 12 November 2026 (UTC)

Max Dyche (born 22 February 2003) is an English professional footballer who plays as a defender for EFL League Two club Northampton Town.

== Career ==
Dyche began his career with Northampton Town. He made his debut on 12 December 2020 against Crewe Alexandra, as a substitute for Christopher Missilou in the 72nd minute of the game. The match ended 2–1 to Crewe. Dyche made his first start against Oxford United on 15 December 2020, the match finishing 4–0 to Oxford. On 4 February 2022, he joined National League North leaders Brackley Town on loan to aid his development.

On 11 September 2023, Dyche joined National League club Aldershot Town on an initial one-month loan deal.

On 27 January 2024 it had been confirmed that Dyche had gone back out on loan. Returning to the National League to spend the rest of the season at Woking. Following nine appearances in a Woking shirt, Dyche was recalled in March due to injuries in the Northampton squad. In June 2024, he returned to Woking on a season-long loan deal. On 8 January 2025, it was announced that Northampton Town had recalled Dyche from his loan spell. Returning to Northamptonshire having featured 25 times, scoring twice for the Cards during his six months at the club.

On 6 May 2025, Northampton announced the player had been offered a new contract. On 23 June 2025, the club announced he had signed a new two-year contract.

== Career statistics ==
As of match played 1 September 2026

Appearances and goals by club, season and competition
Club	Season	League			FA Cup		League Cup		Other		Total	
Club	Season	Division	Apps	Goals	Apps	Goals	Apps	Goals	Apps	Goals	Apps	Goals
Northampton Town	2020–21	League One	2	0	0	0	0	0	0	0	2	0
Northampton Town	2021–22	League Two	1	0	0	0	0	0	1 (Note: Appearance(s) in the EFL Trophy)	0	2	0
Northampton Town	2022–23	League Two	18	1	1	0	0	0	3	0	22	1
Northampton Town	2023–24	League One	4	0	0	0	1	0	2	0	7	0
Northampton Town	2024–25	League One	20	0	0	0	0	0	0	0	20	0
Northampton Town	2025–26	League One	37	2	0	0	1	0	5	0	43	2
Northampton Town	2026–27	League Two	2	0	0	0	1	0	1	0	4	0
Northampton Town	Total		84	3	1	0	3	0	12	0	100	3
Kettering Town (loan)	2021–22	National League North	7	0	0	0	—		0	0	7	0
Brackley Town (loan)	2021–22	National League North	6	1	0	0	—		0	0	6	1
Aldershot Town (loan)	2023–24	National League	2	0	0	0	—		0	0	2	0
Woking (loan)	2023–24	National League	9	0	0	0	—		0	0	9	0
Woking (loan)	2024–25	National League	21	2	2	0	—		2 (Note: Appearance(s) in National League Cup)	0	25	2
Career total			128	6	3	0	3	0	14	0	143	6

== Honours ==
Northampton Town

- EFL League Two promotion: 2022–23

== Personal life ==
Dyche is one of the two children of Sean Dyche.
