= Joe O'Brien-Whitmarsh =

Irish association football player

Personal information
- Full name: Joseph Paul O'Brien-Whitmarsh
- Date of birth: 11 May 2005 (age 21)
- Place of birth: Dublin, Ireland
- Height: 5 ft 8 in (1.73 m)
- Position: Midfielder

Team information
- Current team: Northampton Town

Youth career
- –2019: Fermoy
- 2019–2023: Cork City

Senior career*
Years	Team	Apps	(Gls)
2021–2023	Cork City	23	(4)
2024–2026	Southampton	0	(0)
2025	→ Accrington Stanley (loan)	13	(3)
2026–	Northampton Town	13	(2)

International career^{‡}
2019–2020	Republic of Ireland U15	4	(0)
2021	Republic of Ireland U18	1	(0)
2023	Republic of Ireland U19	4	(0)
2024–2025	Republic of Ireland U21	3	(0)
- * Club domestic league appearances and goals as of 06:21, 15 November 2026 (UTC) ‡ National team caps and goals as of 00:26, 18 November 2026 (UTC)

Joseph Paul O'Brien-Whitmarsh (born 11 May 2005) is an Irish professional footballer who plays as a midfielder for EFL League Two club Northampton Town.

== Club career ==
=== Cork City ===
Born in Dublin, O'Brien-Whitmarsh grew up in Fermoy, County Cork and started his career at local club Fermoy FC before joining Cork City academy in 2019. He signed a professional contract with Cork in 2021. He made his senior debut for Cork City in March 2023 and played for the club in the 2023 League of Ireland Premier Division.

=== Southampton ===
He joined Premier League side Southampton in January 2024 from Cork City for an undisclosed fee. He was included in Southampton's match-day squad for the EFL Cup tie against Cardiff City on 28 August 2024, making his debut as a second-half substitute.

==== Accrington Stanley (loan) ====
On 3 February 2025, O'Brien-Whitmarsh joined League Two side Accrington Stanley on loan for the remainder of the 2024–25 season. He made his debut for the club on 8 February in a 0–0 home draw with AFC Wimbledon. On 4 March, he scored his first goal in English football during a 2–0 home win over Milton Keynes Dons. O'Brien-Whitmarsh scored a brace on 11 March in a 5–0 victory against Newport County.

=== Northampton Town ===
On 17 August 2026, O'Brien-Whitmarsh joined League Two side Northampton Town on a three-year contract for an undisclosed fee. He made his first appearance for the club on 22 August in a 1–0 defeat against Crewe Alexandra after he replaced Logan Briggs in the 66th minute. On 5 September, O'Brien-Whitmarsh scored his first goal for the club in a 1–0 victory against Newport County.

== International career ==
He has been capped by the Republic of Ireland at under-19 level. In November 2024, he received his first call up to the Republic of Ireland U21 squad for their two friendlies against Sweden U21 in Marbella, Spain. He made his debut in a 2–0 defeat to Sweden on 14 November 2024.

== Personal life ==
He is the son of former Cobh Ramblers striker Paul Whitmarsh. His older brother Beineon O'Brien-Whitmarsh has also played professional football in the League of Ireland, with the pair playing for Cork City at the same time.

== Career statistics ==
=== Club ===
As of match played 14 November 2026

Appearances and goals by club, season and competition
Club	Season	League			National cup (Note: Includes FAI Cup)		League cup (Note: Includes EFL Cup)		Other		Total	
Club	Season	Division	Apps	Goals	Apps	Goals	Apps	Goals	Apps	Goals	Apps	Goals
Cork City	2021	LoI First Division	0	0	0	0	—		0	0	0	0
Cork City	2022	LoI First Division	0	0	0	0	—		0	0	0	0
Cork City	2023	LoI Premier Division	23	4	1	0	—		1 (Note: Appearance in League of Ireland Premier Division play-off)	0	25	4
Cork City	Total		23	4	1	0	—		1	0	25	4
Southampton	2024–25	Premier League	0	0	0	0	1	0	—		1	0
Southampton	2025–26	Championship	0	0	1	0	0	0	0	0	1	0
Southampton	Total		0	0	1	0	1	0	0	0	2	0
Accrington Stanley (loan)	2024–25	League Two	13	3	0	0	—		—		13	3
Northampton Town	2026–27	League Two	13	2	0	0	0	0	1 (Note: Appearance(s) in EFL Trophy)	0	14	2
Career total			50	9	1	0	1	0	2	0	54	9
