= Michael Forbes (footballer) =

Northern Irish footballer (born 2004)

- Forbes with Dundee United in 2026

Personal information
- Full name: Michael Forbes
- Date of birth: 29 April 2004 (age 22)
- Place of birth: Ardboe, Northern Ireland
- Height: 1.88 m (6 ft 2 in)
- Position: Centre-back

Team information
- Current team: Dundee United
- Number: 18

Youth career
- 2008–2009: Ardboe
- 2009–2017: Cookstown Youth
- 2017–2020: Dungannon Swifts
- 2020–2022: West Ham United

Senior career*
Years	Team	Apps	(Gls)
2022–2026	West Ham United	0	(0)
2024–2025	→ Bristol Rovers (loan)	7	(0)
2025	→ Colchester United (loan)	0	(0)
2025–2026	→ Northampton Town (loan)	22	(2)
2026–	Dundee United	11	(1)

International career^{‡}
2019	Northern Ireland U16	4	(1)
2022	Northern Ireland U18	2	(1)
2021–2022	Northern Ireland U19	6	(0)
2023–	Northern Ireland U21	8	(0)
2023–	Northern Ireland	1	(0)
- * Club domestic league appearances and goals as of 29 April 2026 (UTC) ‡ National team caps and goals as of 09:59, 29 July 2025 (UTC)

Michael Forbes (born 29 April 2004) is a Northern Irish footballer who plays as a centre-back for Dundee United and the Northern Ireland national team.

== Club career ==
=== West Ham United ===
Forbes is a youth product of Ardboe, Cookstown Youth, and Dungannon Swifts. He joined the youth academy of West Ham United on 24 July 2020 when he signed a scholarship contract with the club. The following season, he captained the U18s and debuted with the U23s in December 2021. He signed his first professional contract with the club on 31 May 2022. He made his first appearance on the senior West Ham squad for a UEFA Conference League match against FCSB on 3 November 2022.

On 5 July 2024, Forbes joined League One club Bristol Rovers on a season-long loan deal. He was recalled on 3 January 2025 to continue rehabilitation from a hamstring injury suffered two weeks prior. On 30 January 2025, he joined League Two side Colchester United on loan for the remainder of the season. During an in-house training match, he once again suffered a hamstring injury requiring surgery, returning to West Ham United in March 2025.

On 25 July 2025, Forbes joined League One side Northampton Town on a season-long loan deal. He made his Northampton debut on 2 August scoring in a 3–1 away defeat to Wigan Athletic.

Forbes was released by West Ham United upon the expiry of his contract at the end of the 2025–26 season.

=== Dundee United ===
On 16 June 2026, Forbes agreed to join Scottish Premiership club Dundee United on an initial two-year deal.

== International career ==
Forbes is a youth international for Northern Ireland, having played up to the Northern Ireland U21s. After injuries to the senior squad in November 2021, he was called up to train with the senior national team. He debuted with the senior Northern Ireland national team as a late substitute in a 4–0 UEFA Euro 2024 qualifying loss to Finland on 17 November 2023.

== Career statistics ==
As of start of 2026–27 season

Appearances and goals by club, season and competition
Club	Season	League			FA Cup		League Cup		Other		Total	
Club	Season	Division	Apps	Goals	Apps	Goals	Apps	Goals	Apps	Goals	Apps	Goals
West Ham United U21	2020–21	—			—		—		1 (Note: Appearance(s) in EFL Trophy)	0	1	0
West Ham United U21	2021–22	—			—		—		0	0	0	0
West Ham United U21	2022–23	—			—		—		3	0	3	0
West Ham United U21	2023–24	—			—		—		3	0	3	0
West Ham United U21	2024–25	—			—		—		0	0	0	0
West Ham United U21	Total		0	0	0	0	0	0	7	0	7	0
Bristol Rovers (loan)	2024–25	League One	7	0	2	0	1	0	2	0	12	0
Colchester United (loan)	2024–25	League Two	0	0	0	0	0	0	0	0	0	0
Northampton Town (loan)	2025–26	League One	22	2	1	0	1	0	2	0	25	2
Dundee United	2026—27	Scottish Premiership	11	1	—		—		0	0	11	1
Career total			40	3	3	0	2	0	11	0	55	3

=== International ===
As of matches played 17 November 2023

Appearances and goals by national team and year
National team	Year	Apps	Goals
Northern Ireland	2023	1	0
Northern Ireland	Total	1	0
