= Conor McCarthy (association footballer) =

Irish footballer (born 1998)

Personal information
- Full name: Conor McCarthy
- Date of birth: 11 April 1998 (age 28)
- Place of birth: Blarney, County Cork, Ireland
- Height: 1.93 m (6 ft 4 in)
- Position: Defender

Team information
- Current team: Northampton Town
- Number: 15

Youth career
- Blarney United
- Cork City

Senior career*
Years	Team	Apps	(Gls)
2016–2019	Cork City	66	(6)
2020–2022	St Mirren	68	(2)
2022–2025	Barnsley	27	(0)
2024	→ Swindon Town (loan)	18	(0)
2025–	Northampton Town	32	(1)

International career
- Republic of Ireland U18
- Republic of Ireland U21
- * Club domestic league appearances and goals as of 14:21, 22 November 2026 (UTC)

Conor McCarthy (born 11 April 1998) is an Irish professional footballer who plays as a defender for EFL League Two club Northampton Town. He has previously played for Cork City and St Mirren.

== Club career ==
A Blarney native, McCarthy began his career with local club Blarney United, before signing for Cork City. Whilst playing for Cork's under-19 team, McCarthy captained Cork to a 1–0 UEFA Youth League win over HJK Helsinki - the first victory by an Irish club in the competition's history. McCarthy signed for Scottish club St Mirren in January 2020.

=== Barnsley ===
In June 2022 it was announced that he would sign for English club Barnsley on 1 July 2022, signing a three-year contract.

In January 2024, he joined League Two club Swindon Town on loan until the end of the season.

He was released by Barnsley at the end of the 2024–25 season.

=== Northampton Town ===
On 23 June 2025, McCarthy agreed to join League One side Northampton Town on a two-year deal upon the expiration of his Barnsley contract.

== International career ==
McCarthy has represented the Republic of Ireland at under-18 and under-21 level.

== Career statistics ==
As of match played 21 November 2026

Club	Season	League			National Cup		League Cup		Europe		Other		Total	
Club	Season	Division	Apps	Goals	Apps	Goals	Apps	Goals	Apps	Goals	Apps	Goals	Apps	Goals
Cork City	2016	LOI Premier Division	2	1	0	0	2	1	0	0	0	0	4	2
Cork City	2017	LOI Premier Division	7	0	4	0	3	0	0	0	2 (Note: 1 appearance in President's Cup and 1 appearance in Munster Senior Cup)	0	16	0
Cork City	2018	LOI Premier Division	22	1	5	0	0	0	1 (Note: Appearances in UEFA Champions League)	0	2 (Note: 1 appearance in President's Cup and 2 appearances, 1 goal in Munster Senior Cup)	1	30	1
Cork City	2019	LOI Premier Division	35	4	2	1	1	0	2 (Note: Appearances in UEFA Europa League)	1	2 (Note: 1 appearance in President's Cup and 1 appearance in Munster Senior Cup)	0	42	6
Cork City	Total		66	6	11	1	6	1	3	1	6	1	92	9
St Mirren	2019–20	Scottish Premiership	9	1	4	0	—		—		—		13	1
St Mirren	2020–21	Scottish Premiership	37	0	4	1	5	1	—		—		46	2
St Mirren	2021–22	Scottish Premiership	22	1	1	0	2	1	—		—		25	2
St Mirren	Total		68	2	8	1	7	2	0	0	0	0	84	5
Barnsley	2022–23	League One	7	0	0	0	2	0	—		2 (Note: Appearance(s) in EFL Trophy)	0	11	0
Barnsley	2023–24	League One	0	0	0	0	0	0	—		3	1	3	1
Barnsley	2024–25	League One	20	0	0	0	1	0	—		3	0	24	0
Barnsley	Total		27	0	0	0	3	0	0	0	8	1	38	1
Swindon Town (loan)	2023–24	League Two	18	0	0	0	0	0	—		0	0	18	0
Northampton Town	2025–26	League One	30	1	0	0	1	0	—		6	1	37	2
Northampton Town	2026–27	League Two	2	0	1	0	0	0	—		2	0	5	0
Northampton Town	Total		32	1	1	0	1	0	0	0	8	1	42	2
Career Total			211	9	21	2	17	3	3	1	22	3	274	17
