= Jack Perkins (English footballer) =

English footballer (born 2003)

Personal information
- Full name: Jack William Perkins
- Date of birth: 26 October 2003 (age 23)
- Place of birth: Nottingham, England
- Height: 1.78 m (5 ft 10 in)
- Position: Midfielder

Team information
- Current team: Northampton Town
- Number: 21

Youth career
- –2025: Nottingham Forest

Senior career*
Years	Team	Apps	(Gls)
2025–	Northampton Town	30	(1)
- * Club domestic league appearances and goals as of 21:00, 6 April 2026 (UTC)

Jack William Perkins (born 26 October 2003) is an English professional footballer who plays as a midfielder for EFL League One club Northampton Town.

== Career ==
Perkins was a member of the youth academy of Nottingham Forest from under-8 level. After progressing through the youth ranks, during the 2023-24 season he made 19 appearances in Premier League 2 as well as three starts in the EFL Trophy and signed a new one-year professional contract with the club. He made three further EFL Trophy appearances the following season, prior to training with EFL League One club Northampton Town for the last week of the 2024-25 season. He subsequently signed for an undisclosed fee in the summer of 2025, agreeing a two-year contract.

=== Northampton Town ===
He featured for Northampton at both wingback and in central midfield during their preseason fixtures. He made his league debut for Northampton as part of a back-five on 2 August 2025, away against Wigan Athletic in League One, in a 3-1 defeat. On 8th November 2025, Perkins scored his first senior goal in a 2-1 win over Mansfield Town. He was considered by many fans to be the most improved player across the season, deputising as Left Back, Left Wing-Back and Left Winger throughout the season. His first season was cut short by injury.

== Career statistics ==
As of match played 8 August 2026

Appearances and goals by club, season and competition
Club	Season	League			FA Cup		EFL Cup		Other		Total	
Club	Season	Division	Apps	Goals	Apps	Goals	Apps	Goals	Apps	Goals	Apps	Goals
Nottingham Forest U21	2023–24	—	—		—		—		3 (Note: Appearances in EFL Trophy)	0	3	0
Nottingham Forest U21	2024–25	—	—		—		—		3	0	3	0
Nottingham Forest U21	Total		0	0	0	0	0	0	6	0	6	0
Northampton Town	2025–26	League One	30	1	1	0	1	0	5	0	37	1
Northampton Town	2026–27	League Two	0	0	0	0	1	0	0	0	1	0
Northampton Town	Total		30	1	1	0	2	0	5	0	38	1
Career Total			30	1	1	0	2	0	11	0	44	1
