= Kamarai Swyer =

English footballer (born 2002)

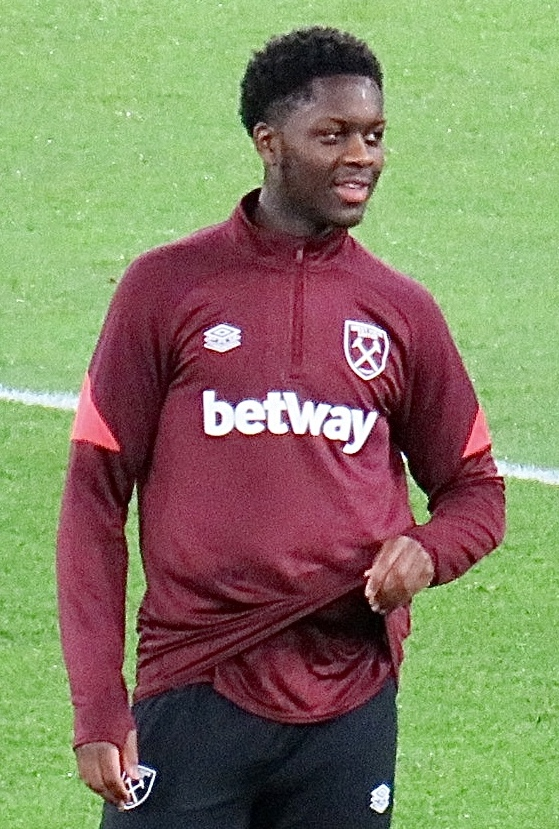
- Simon-Swyer with West Ham United in 2021

Personal information
- Full name: Kamarai Joshua Simon-Swyer
- Date of birth: 4 December 2002 (age 23)
- Place of birth: Redbridge, England
- Height: 6 ft 0 in (1.83 m)
- Position: Attacking midfielder

Team information
- Current team: Northampton Town
- Number: 11

Youth career
- –2022: West Ham United

Senior career*
| Years | Team | Apps | (Gls) |
| 2021–2025 | West Ham United | 0 | (0) |
| 2023–2024 | → Crawley Town (loan) | 6 | (0) |
| 2025– | Northampton Town | 36 | (0) |
- * Club domestic league appearances and goals as of 12 November 2026 (UTC)

Kamarai Joshua Simon-Swyer (born 4 December 2002) is an English professional footballer who plays as an attacking midfielder for EFL League Two club Northampton Town.

== Career ==
Simon-Swyer joined West Ham United at the age of eight. On his 18th birthday, Simon-Swyer signed his first professional contract with West Ham.

Simon-Swyer's first involvement in West Ham's first team came in a 1–0 defeat against Dinamo Zagreb, where he was an unused substitute in a UEFA Europa League tie on 9 December 2021. On 3 November 2022, Simon-Swyer made his debut for West Ham in a 3–0 UEFA Europa Conference League win against Romanian club FCSB coming on as a 77th minute substitute for Divin Mubama.

In July 2023, he signed a further two-year contract with the club.

On 29 July 2023, Simon-Swyer signed for League Two club Crawley Town on a season-long loan. He made his Crawley debut on 5 August in a 1–0 home win against Bradford City coming on as an 83rd minute substitute for Dom Telford. Having made 11 appearances for the club, he was recalled by West Ham in January 2024.

In May 2025, Simon-Swyer signed a two-year contract with League One team Northampton Town linking up again with manager Kevin Nolan with whom he had worked when Nolan was first team coach at West Ham United.

== Career statistics ==
As of match played 8 August 2026

Appearances and goals by club, season and competition
| Club | Season | League | | | FA Cup | | EFL Cup | | Europe | | Other | | Total | |
| Club | Season | Division | Apps | Goals | Apps | Goals | Apps | Goals | Apps | Goals | Apps | Goals | Apps | Goals |
|---|---|---|---|---|---|---|---|---|---|---|---|---|---|---|
| West Ham United U21 | 2020–21 | — | | | — | | — | | — | | 1 (Note: Appearance(s) in EFL Trophy) | 0 | 1 | 0 |
| West Ham United U21 | 2021–22 | — | | | — | | — | | — | | 3 | 0 | 3 | 0 |
| West Ham United U21 | 2022–23 | — | | | — | | — | | — | | 1 | 1 | 1 | 1 |
| West Ham United U21 | 2024–25 | — | | | — | | — | | — | | 3 | 1 | 3 | 1 |
| West Ham United U21 | Total | | — | | — | | — | | — | | 8 | 2 | 8 | 2 |
| West Ham United | 2022–23 | Premier League | 0 | 0 | 0 | 0 | 0 | 0 | 1 (Note: Appearances in UEFA Europa Conference League) | 0 | — | | 1 | 0 |
| West Ham United | Total | | 0 | 0 | 0 | 0 | 0 | 0 | 1 | 0 | 0 | 0 | 1 | 0 |
| Crawley Town (loan) | 2023–24 | League Two | 6 | 0 | 0 | 0 | 1 | 0 | — | | 4 | 1 | 11 | 1 |
| Northampton Town | 2025–26 | League One | 34 | 0 | 1 | 0 | 0 | 0 | — | | 7 | 5 | 42 | 5 |
| Northampton Town | 2026–27 | League Two | 0 | 0 | 0 | 0 | 1 | 0 | — | | 0 | 0 | 1 | 0 |
| Northampton Town | Total | | 34 | 0 | 1 | 0 | 1 | 0 | 1 | 0 | 7 | 5 | 43 | 5 |
| Career total | | | 40 | 0 | 1 | 0 | 2 | 0 | 1 | 0 | 19 | 8 | 63 | 8 |
