= Jon Guthrie =

English footballer

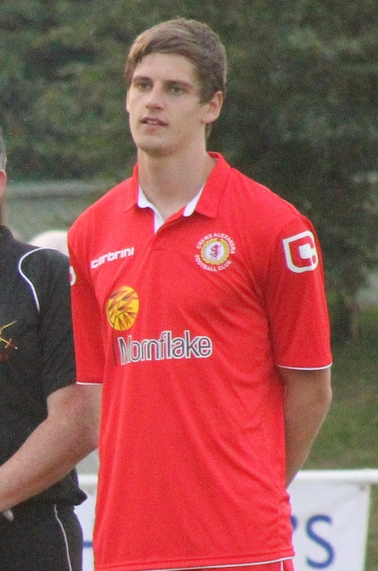
- Guthrie in 2012

Personal information
- Full name: Jonathan Neil Guthrie
- Date of birth: 29 July 1992 (age 34)
- Place of birth: Devizes, England
- Height: 6 ft 3 in (1.91 m)
- Position: Defender

Team information
- Current team: Northampton Town
- Number: 5

Youth career
- 2001–2008: Pewsey Vale

Senior career*
Years	Team	Apps	(Gls)
2008–2012	Pewsey Vale		
2012–2017	Crewe Alexandra	122	(1)
2012	→ Leek Town (loan)	8	(0)
2017–2019	Walsall	88	(3)
2019–2021	Livingston	64	(10)
2021–	Northampton Town	175	(17)
- * Club domestic league appearances and goals as of 12 November 2026 (UTC)

Jonathan Neil Guthrie (born 29 July 1992) is an English professional footballer who plays as a defender for EFL League Two club Northampton Town.

He began his career with Pewsey Vale and has also played for Crewe Alexandra, Leek Town, Walsall and Livingston.

== Club career ==
Guthrie was born in Devizes, Wiltshire. He started his career with Pewsey Vale, progressing through the youth system before playing for the first-team in the Wessex League from the age of 16.

=== Crewe Alexandra ===
In September 2011, he joined League Two side Crewe Alexandra on a 10-week trial. In February 2012, he signed his first professional contract with Crewe, on an 18-month deal. In March 2012, he joined Northern Premier League side Leek Town on loan, where he made a total of 8 appearances.

He made his professional debut for Crewe on 23 October 2012, in a 2–1 win over Swindon Town in League One, coming on as a late substitute for Michael West. He scored his first professional goal on 27 February 2016, against Barnsley. The following month, he signed a new contract at Crewe through to the summer of 2017 and in August 2016 was offered a new contract beyond 2017. In March 2017, he was sidelined with a hernia problem.

On 9 May 2017, Crewe said Guthrie's contract offer remained open but manager David Artell gave a 22 May deadline for a decision, otherwise the offer would be "ripped up". On 23 May it was confirmed that Guthrie would be leaving the club.

=== Walsall ===
On 22 June 2017, Guthrie agreed to join League One side Walsall on a two-year contract. He scored his first goal for the club on 10 February 2018, in a 2–2 draw with Blackpool at Bloomfield Road. He made 52 appearances during his first season with the club, scoring once.

Guthrie continued to be a regular in the first team, making 49 appearances in all competitions during the 2018–19 season, including scoring a brace in a 2–3 loss to Portsmouth on 12 March 2019. He was released by Walsall at the end of the 2018–19 season.

=== Livingston ===
On 12 August 2019, Guthrie joined Livingston of the Scottish Premiership on a two-year deal with an option of a third.

=== Northampton Town ===
On 24 June 2021 it was announced Guthrie had joined Northampton Town on a two-year contract. Guthrie was selected in the 2021–22 League 2 PFA Team of the season, alongside fellow Cobblers players Liam Roberts and Fraser Horsfall. The following season he captained the club towards promotion to League 1, finishing in 3rd.

In May 2025, after multiple consistent seasons, in which he captained the club to their highest finish in the English Football Pyramid for 16 years, the club offered captain Guthrie a new deal, and he signed a one-year contract with an option for a further year. On 5 May 2026, Northampton announced it had triggered the one-year extension keeping him at the club until 2027. He suffered an ACL Injury on New Years Day 2025, sidelining him for the remainder of the 2024–25 season, as well as the first half of the 2025–26 season. On 10th December 2025, He made he returned top the pitch, 11 months after the injury took place. He slowly made his way back to the starting 11 but couldn't prevent the club from being relegated back to League 2.

== Career statistics ==
As of match played 24 October 2026

Club	Season	League			FA Cup		League Cup		Other		Total	
Club	Season	Division	Apps	Goals	Apps	Goals	Apps	Goals	Apps	Goals	Apps	Goals
Crewe Alexandra	2012–13	League One	2	0	0	0	0	0	0	0	2	0
Crewe Alexandra	2013–14	League One	23	0	2	0	0	0	0	0	25	0
Crewe Alexandra	2014–15	League One	25	0	2	0	2	0	1 (Note: Appearance in Football League Trophy)	0	30	0
Crewe Alexandra	2015–16	League One	39	1	1	0	1	0	1	0	42	1
Crewe Alexandra	2016–17	League Two	33	0	2	0	1	0	2 (Note: Appearance(s) in EFL Trophy)	0	38	0
Crewe Alexandra	Total		122	1	7	0	4	0	4	0	137	1
Walsall	2017–18	League One	46	1	1	0	1	0	4	0	52	1
Walsall	2018–19	League One	42	2	4	0	2	0	1	0	49	2
Walsall	Total		88	3	5	0	3	0	5	0	101	3
Livingston	2019–20	Scottish Premiership	28	5	2	0	2	0	0	0	32	5
Livingston	2020–21	Scottish Premiership	36	5	2	0	6	0	0	0	44	5
Livingston	Total		64	10	4	0	8	0	0	0	76	10
Northampton Town	2021–22	League Two	44	8	2	0	2	0	2 (Note: Appearances in League Two play-offs)	0	50	8
Northampton Town	2022–23	League Two	41	2	1	0	1	0	0	0	43	2
Northampton Town	2023–24	League One	36	4	0	0	0	0	1	0	37	4
Northampton Town	2024–25	League One	24	1	1	0	1	0	0	0	26	1
Northampton Town	2025–26	League One	17	1	0	0	0	0	2	0	19	1
Northampton Town	2026–27	League Two	11	1	0	0	1	0	2	0	14	1
Northampton Town	Total		173	17	4	0	5	0	5	0	189	17
Career total			449	31	20	0	20	0	16	0	503	31

== Honours ==
Northampton Town

- League Two promotion: 2022–23

Individual

- PFA Team of the Year: League Two 2021–22
- League Two Team of the Season: 2021–22
