= Jack Vale (footballer, born 2001) =

Welsh footballer

Personal information
- Full name: Jack Robert Vale
- Date of birth: 3 March 2001 (age 25)
- Place of birth: Wrexham, Wales
- Height: 1.85 m (6 ft 1 in)
- Position: Forward

Youth career
- –2017: The New Saints
- 2017–2020: Blackburn Rovers

Senior career*
Years	Team	Apps	(Gls)
2020–2025	Blackburn Rovers	18	(0)
2020	→ Barrow (loan)	0	(0)
2021	→ Rochdale (loan)	3	(0)
2021–2022	→ FC Halifax Town (loan)	10	(1)
2023–2024	→ Lincoln City (loan)	14	(1)
2024	→ Motherwell (loan)	13	(2)
2024–2025	→ Motherwell (loan)	6	(0)
2025–2026	Northampton Town	18	(0)

International career^{‡}
2016–2017	Wales U17	6	(1)
2018–2019	Wales U19	6	(0)
2019–2022	Wales U21	6	(3)
- * Club domestic league appearances and goals as of 15 October 2026 ‡ National team caps and goals as of 09:54, 18 September 2022 (UTC)

Jack Robert Vale (born 3 March 2001) is a Welsh footballer who plays as a forward. He is a former Wales under-21 international.

== Club career ==
=== Blackburn Rovers ===
On 16 March 2017, Vale signed his professional contract with Blackburn on a two-and-a-half-year deal. He signed a new long-term deal on 4 October 2019, agreeing a deal to keep him at the club until the summer of 2023.

Vale made his professional debut for Blackburn in the club's first Championship game of the 2020–21 season against Reading on 18 July 2020, coming on as a substitute for Adam Armstrong in the 78th minute of the game. Blackburn sealed a 4–3 victory against The Royals after a late goal by Sam Gallagher.

On 19 May 2025, it was announced he will be leaving the club upon the expiration of his current contract.

==== Loan to Barrow ====
On 5 March 2020, National League outfit Barrow announced that they had agreed a deal to take Vale on loan until the end of the season. However, as a result of the ongoing COVID-19 pandemic, the National League announced on 16 March that the season would be suspended until the beginning of April. Days before the league was due to resume, it was announced that the season had been suspended indefinitely. As a result, Vale was unable to make a single appearance for Barrow.

==== Loan to Rochdale ====
On 1 February 2021, Vale joined League One side Rochdale until the end of the season. Vale joined a side which were ultimately relegated to League Two, only managing to make three appearances for Rochdale.

==== Loan to FC Halifax Town ====
On 9 September 2021, Vale joined National League side FC Halifax Town, linking up with fellow academy player Aidan Dowling at the club. Vale made his National League debut for Halifax two days later on 11 September, in the club's 3–1 defeat of Southend United. He scored the first professional goal of his career on 14 December, scoring in the 93rd minute to secure a 2–0 win against King's Lynn Town.

==== Loan to Lincoln City ====
On 1 September 2023, Vale joined Lincoln City on a season-long loan deal. He made his debut on 24 October, coming off the bench against Charlton Athletic. He scored his first goal in an EFL Trophy match against Notts County on 7 November 2023. On 5 January 2024, he was recalled from his loan spell.

==== Loan to Motherwell ====
On 31 January 2024, Vale joined Scottish Premiership club Motherwell on loan until the end of the season. He returned to the club on a season-long loan on 30 August 2024.

=== Northampton Town ===
On 18 September 2025, Vale Joined Northampton Town. He was released at the end of the season.

== International career ==
Vale has represented the Wales national team at U17, U19 and U21 level.

== Career statistics ==
As of 10 February 2026

Appearances and goals by club, season and competition
Club	Season	League			National cup (Note: Includes FA Cup, Scottish Cup)		League cup (Note: Includes EFL Cup)		Other		Total	
Club	Season	Division	Apps	Goals	Apps	Goals	Apps	Goals	Apps	Goals	Apps	Goals
Blackburn Rovers	2019–20	Championship	1	0	0	0	0	0	0	0	1	0
Blackburn Rovers	2020–21	Championship	0	0	0	0	0	0	0	0	0	0
Blackburn Rovers	2021–22	Championship	2	0	0	0	0	0	0	0	2	0
Blackburn Rovers	2022–23	Championship	15	0	4	1	3	1	0	0	22	2
Blackburn Rovers	Total		18	0	4	1	3	1	0	0	25	2
Barrow (loan)	2019–20	National League	0	0	0	0	0	0	0	0	0	0
Rochdale (loan)	2020–21	League One	3	0	0	0	0	0	0	0	3	0
FC Halifax Town (loan)	2021–22	National League	10	1	3	1	0	0	1 (Note: Appearance in FA Trophy)	1	14	3
Lincoln City (loan)	2023–24	League One	14	1	1	0	0	0	2 (Note: Appearances in EFL Trophy)	1	17	2
Motherwell (loan)	2023–24	Scottish Premiership	13	2	1	1	0	0	0	0	14	3
Motherwell (loan)	2024–25	Scottish Premiership	6	0	1	1	0	0	0	0	7	1
Northampton Town	2025–26	League One	12	0	0	0	0	0	4	1	16	1
Career total			76	4	10	4	3	1	7	3	96	12
