= Neo Dobson =

English footballer (born 2006)

Personal information
- Full name: Neo Isaiah Dobson
- Date of birth: 6 December 2006 (age 19)
- Place of birth: Hackney, England
- Position: Forward

Team information
- Current team: St Ives Town (on loan from Northampton Town)

Youth career
- –2023: Northampton Town

Senior career*
Years	Team	Apps	(Gls)
2023–	Northampton Town	4	(0)
2023–2024	→ Kettering Town (loan)	3	(1)
2024	→ Banbury United (loan)	2	(0)
2024–2025	→ Corby Town (loan)	21	(7)
2025–2026	→ St Ives Town (loan)	15	(8)
2026–	→ St Ives Town (loan)	0	(0)
- * Club domestic league appearances and goals as of 8:41, 22 July 2026 (UTC)

Neo Isaiah Dobson (born 6 December 2006) is an English professional footballer who plays as a forward for St Ives Town on loan from EFL League Two club Northampton Town.

== Career ==
Dobson started his career with Northampton Town, making his senior debut in September 2023 as a second-half substitute in an EFL Trophy tie against Chelsea U21. In December 2023, having made a second senior appearance in the EFL Trophy, he joined Southern League Premier Division Central side Kettering Town on a one-month loan deal.

In September 2024, Dobson joined Banbury United on an initial one-month loan deal, subsequently joining Corby Town upon the expiration of this deal for a further month. Following his return to Northampton Town, he found himself more involved in the first-team, scoring his first goals for the club with a brace in a 3–0 EFL Trophy victory over Leicester City U21. He subsequently made his league debut on 9 November 2024, appearing as a substitute in a 1–1 draw with Birmingham City.

He joined St Ives Town on loan in August 2026.

== Career statistics ==
As of match played 4 May 2026

Appearances and goals by club, season and competition
Club	Season	League			FA Cup		League Cup		Other		Total	
Club	Season	Division	Apps	Goals	Apps	Goals	Apps	Goals	Apps	Goals	Apps	Goals
Northampton Town	2023–24	League One	0	0	0	0	0	0	2 (Note: Appearance(s) in EFL Trophy)	0	2	0
Northampton Town	2024–25	League One	3	0	0	0	0	0	4	3	7	3
Northampton Town	2025–26	League One	1	0	0	0	0	0	0	0	1	0
Northampton Town	Total		4	0	0	0	0	0	6	3	10	3
Kettering Town (loan)	2023–24	SLP Division Central	3	1	0	0	—		0	0	3	1
Banbury United (loan)	2024–25	SLP Division Central	2	0	0	0	—		1 (Note: Appearance(s) in FA Trophy)	0	3	0
Corby Town (loan)	2024–25	NPL Midlands Division	21	7	0	0	—		2 (Note: Appearance(s) in NPL Play-offs)	0	23	7
St Ives Town (loan)	2025–26	SLP Division Central	15	8	0	0	—		0	0	15	8
Career total			34	9	0	0	0	0	9	3	43	20
