= Ross Fitzsimons =

English footballer (born 1994)

Personal information
- Full name: Ross Alan Richard Frank Fitzsimons
- Date of birth: 28 May 1994 (age 32)
- Place of birth: Hammersmith, England
- Height: 1.90 m (6 ft 3 in)
- Position: Goalkeeper

Team information
- Current team: Northampton Town
- Number: 34

Youth career
- –2011: Crystal Palace

Senior career*
Years	Team	Apps	(Gls)
2011–2014	Crystal Palace	0	(0)
2013	→ Harrow Borough (loan)		
2013–2014	→ Hendon (loan)	8	(0)
2013	→ Havant & Waterlooville (loan)	4	(0)
2014	→ Farnborough (loan)	10	(0)
2014–2016	Bolton Wanderers	0	(0)
2015–2016	→ Bishop's Stortford (loan)	8	(0)
2016	Braintree Town	1	(0)
2016–2017	Chelmsford City	40	(0)
2017–2020	Notts County	49	(0)
2020	→ Chesterfield (loan)	1	(0)
2020–2021	Boston United	13	(0)
2021	Stockport County	0	(0)
2021–2022	Weymouth	43	(0)
2022	St Joseph's	0	(0)
2022–2023	Chesterfield	33	(0)
2023–2025	Scunthorpe United	91	(0)
2025–	Northampton Town	22	(0)
- * Club domestic league appearances and goals as of 21:05, 14 February 2026 (UTC)

Ross Alan Richard Frank Fitzsimons (born 28 May 1994) is an English professional footballer who plays as a goalkeeper for EFL League Two side Northampton Town.

== Playing career ==
=== Early career ===
Fitzsimons began his career at Crystal Palace. On 17 January 2013, he joined Isthmian League Premier side Harrow Borough on an initial one-month loan to replace the departed Elvijs Putnins. He returned to the Isthmian League Premier on a one-month loan at Hendon in December 2013. He made his debut in a 6–0 win at Cray Wanderers on 17 December. He went on to play a total of eight league games and one cup game for the "Greens".

On 10 September 2013, he joined Conference South club Havant & Waterlooville on a one-month loan to provide cover for the injured Scott Bevan. He made his debut the "Hawks" he following day in a 2–1 win over Farnborough at West Leigh Park. He made three further appearances for the club before returning to Selhurst Park. On 20 March 2014, he joined Farnborough on a one-month loan, and made his debut two days later in a 3–1 victory at Bishop's Stortford. He played a total of ten games for the "Yellows" before returning to the "Eagles". He was released by Crystal Palace in May 2014.

On 1 July 2014, Fitzsimons signed a two-year contract with Championship club Bolton Wanderers. On 16 December 2015, he joined National League South club Bishop's Stortford on a one-month loan. The loan was later extended into a second month, and he made a total of eight appearances for the "Blues". He was released by the "Trotters" in May 2016.

On 16 August 2016, he joined National League club Braintree Town on a short-term deal to stand in for the suspended Jamie Butler. He made his debut for the "Iron" later that day in a 2–1 defeat at Maidstone United. He joined Chelmsford City on 25 August, and manager Rod Stringer released goalkeepers Joe Welch and Colan Balkwell in the week following Fitzsimons's arrival. On 28 March 2017, he kept a clean sheet as Chelmsford beat East Thurrock United 1–0 in the final of the Essex Senior Cup. He made a total of 40 league appearances for the "Clarets", helping the club to qualify for the play-offs with a fourth-place finish; the club reached the play-off final, but were beaten 2–1 by Ebbsfleet United at Stonebridge Road.

=== Notts County ===
On 27 July 2017, Fitzsimons signed with Notts County following a trial period. Manager Kevin Nolan said that he expected Fitzsimons to challenge Adam Collin for a first team place. Fitzsimons stated that he was looking forwards to working with goalkeeping coach Mark Crossley, who he said "has a very effective way of coaching". He made his debut on 8 August, in a 3–3 draw with Scunthorpe United at Glanford Park in the first round of the EFL Cup; County lost the resulting penalty shoot-out 6–5.

He was offered new contract by Notts County at the end of the 2017–18 season.

==== Chesterfield (loan) ====
On 16 January 2020, Fitzsimons joined Chesterfield on loan for the remainder or the 2019–20 season. He was recalled by Notts County on 24 January following an injury to Sam Slocombe.

=== Boston United ===
On 22 August 2020, Fitsimons joined National League North side Boston United on an initial one-year deal. On 11 January 2021, Fitzsimons was awarded the National League North Player of the Month award for December 2020.

=== Stockport County ===
On 26 March 2021, Fitzsimons joined National League side Stockport County on a short-term contract.

=== Weymouth ===
On 12 July 2021, Fitzsimons joined Weymouth following the expiration of his Stockport contract.

=== St Joseph's ===
On 4 July 2022, it was revealed that Fitzsimons had moved to Gibraltar to join St Joseph's, with the goalkeeper being announced as part of their Europa Conference League squad to face Larne. He kept a clean sheet in both his first games as the Saints recorded an historic 1–0 aggregate victory over their Northern Irish opponents.

=== Chesterfield ===
In August 2022, Fitzsimons returned to England, joining National League side Chesterfield on a permanent basis following a short loan spell two years prior. Following defeat in the 2023 play-off final, he departed the club at the end of the 2022–23 season.

=== Scunthorpe United ===
On 17 May 2023, Fitzsimons agreed to join recently relegated National League North side Scunthorpe United on a two-year deal.

The 2024–25 season saw Fitzsimons named in the National League North Team of the Year having helped the Iron to promotion through the play-offs. He was offered a new contract following the conclusion of the season.

=== Northampton Town ===
On 9 June 2025, Fitzsimons agreed to join League One side Northampton Town on a one-year deal.

== Career statistics ==
As of match played 14 February 2026

Appearances and goals by club, season and competition
Club	Season	League			FA Cup		League Cup		Other		Total	
Club	Season	Division	Apps	Goals	Apps	Goals	Apps	Goals	Apps	Goals	Apps	Goals
Crystal Palace	2011–12	Championship	0	0	0	0	0	0	0	0	0	0
Crystal Palace	2012–13	Championship	0	0	0	0	0	0	0	0	0	0
Crystal Palace	2013–14	Premier League	0	0	0	0	0	0	—		0	0
Crystal Palace	Total		0	0	0	0	0	0	0	0	0	0
Hendon (loan)	2013–14	Isthmian League Premier	8	0	0	0	—		1	0	9	0
Havant & Waterlooville (loan)	2013–14	Conference South	4	0	2	0	—		0	0	6	0
Farnborough (loan)	2013–14	Conference South	10	0	0	0	—		0	0	10	0
Bolton Wanderers	2014–15	Championship	0	0	0	0	0	0	0	0	0	0
Bolton Wanderers	2015–16	Championship	0	0	0	0	0	0	0	0	0	0
Bolton Wanderers	Total		0	0	0	0	0	0	0	0	0	0
Bishop's Stortford (loan)	2015–16	National League South	8	0	0	0	—		0	0	8	0
Braintree Town	2016–17	National League	1	0	0	0	—		0	0	1	0
Chelmsford City	2016–17	National League South	40	0	0	0	—		4 (Note: Appearances in the FA Trophy)	0	44	0
Notts County	2017–18	League Two	17	0	3	0	1	0	0	0	21	0
Notts County	2018–19	League Two	29	0	1	0	1	0	3 (Note: Appearances in EFL Trophy)	0	34	0
Notts County	2019–20	National League	3	0	0	0	0	0	1	0	4	0
Notts County	Total		49	0	4	0	2	0	4	0	59	0
Chesterfield (loan)	2019–20	National League	1	0	0	0	—		0	0	1	0
Boston United	2020–21	National League North	13	0	0	0	—		2	0	15	0
Stockport County	2020–21	National League	0	0	0	0	—		0	0	0	0
Weymouth	2021–22	National League	43	0	2	0	—		2	0	47	0
Chesterfield	2022–23	National League	33	0	3	0	—		2 (Note: Appearances in National League Play-offs)	0	38	0
Scunthorpe United	2023–24	National League North	45	0	2	0	0	0	3 (Note: 1 Appearance in National League North Play-offs)	0	50	0
Scunthorpe United	2024–25	National League North	46	0	0	0	0	0	2 (Note: Appearances in National League North Play-offs)	0	48	0
Scunthorpe United	Total		91	0	2	0	0	0	5	0	98	0
Northampton Town	2025–26	League One	22	0	1	0	1	0	2	0	26	0
Career total			323	0	14	0	3	0	19	0	362	0

== Honours ==
Chelmsford City

- Essex Senior Cup: 2017

Scunthorpe United

- National League North play-offs: 2025

Individual

- National League North Player of the Month: December 2020
- National League North Team of the Season: 2024–25
