= James Dadge =

English footballer (born 2004)

Personal information
- Full name: James Michael Dadge
- Date of birth: 18 October 2004 (age 22)
- Place of birth: Northampton, England
- Position: Goalkeeper

Team information
- Current team: Northampton Town
- Number: 31

Youth career
- –2023: Northampton Town

Senior career*
Years	Team	Apps	(Gls)
2023–	Northampton Town	2	(0)
2023	→ St Ives Town (loan)	16	(0)
2023	→ Harborough Town (loan)	3	(0)
2024	→ St Ives Town (loan)	4	(0)
2024	→ Banbury United (loan)	7	(0)
2024	→ Harborough Town (loan)	3	(0)
2025	→ Spalding United (loan)	10	(0)
- * Club domestic league appearances and goals as of 12:05, 7 August 2026 (UTC)

James Michael Dadge (born 18 October 2004) is an English professional footballer who plays as a goalkeeper for Spalding United, on loan from EFL League Two club Northampton Town.

== Career ==
A product of the Northampton Town academy, Dadge spent time on loan with St Ives Town, Harborough Town and Banbury United across the 2022–23 and 2023–24 seasons.

On 3 May 2025, the final day of the 2024–25 season, Dadge made his senior debut for the Cobblers, appearing as a late substitute in a 1–1 draw with Wigan Athletic. Having previously appeared on the bench for the first-team on over fifty occasions, he spoke of the 'amazing feeling' to finally make his debut, manager Kevin Nolan challenging the youngster to push to become first-choice for the following season.

In August 2025, Dadge joined Southern League Premier Division South club Spalding United on loan.

== Career statistics ==
As of end of 2024–25 season

Appearances and goals by club, season and competition
Club	Season	League			FA Cup		League Cup		Other		Total	
Club	Season	Division	Apps	Goals	Apps	Goals	Apps	Goals	Apps	Goals	Apps	Goals
Northampton Town	2022–23	League Two	0	0	0	0	0	0	0	0	0	0
Northampton Town	2023–24	League One	0	0	0	0	0	0	0	0	0	0
Northampton Town	2024–25	League One	1	0	0	0	0	0	0	0	1	0
Northampton Town	2025-26	League Two	0	0	1	0	0	0	0	0	1	0
Northampton Town	Total		1	0	0	0	0	0	0	0	2	0
St Ives Town (loan)	2022–23	Southern League Premier Division Central	16	0	0	0	—		1 (Note: Appearance(s) in Huntingdonshire Senior Cup)	0	17	0
Harborough Town (loan)	2023–24	NPL Division One Midlands	3	0	0	0	—		2 (Note: Appearance(s) in FA Trophy)	0	5	0
St Ives Town (loan)	2023–24	Southern League Premier Division Central	4	0	0	0	—		1	0	5	0
Banbury United (loan)	2023–24	National League North	7	0	0	0	—		0	0	7	0
Harborough Town (loan)	2024–25	Southern League Premier Division Central	3	0	0	0	—		0	0	3	0
Career total			34	0	0	0	0	0	4	0	38	0
