= 2024–25 Bolton Wanderers F.C. season =

136th season in existence of Bolton Wanderers FC

Bolton Wanderers
2024–25 season
- Owner: Football Ventures Ltd (92%), British Business Bank (8%)
- Chairman: Sharon Brittan
- Manager: Ian Evatt (until 22 January); Julian Darby, Andrew Tutte, and Andy Taylor (interim from 22 January); Steven Schumacher (from 30 January)
- Stadium: Toughsheet Community Stadium
- League One: 8th
- FA Cup: First round
- EFL Cup: Third round
- EFL Trophy: Quarter-Final
- Top goalscorer: League: Aaron Collins (12); All: Aaron Collins (19)
- Highest home attendance: 25,957 (vs. Wrexham, 18 August)
- Lowest home attendance: 1,607 (vs. Fleetwood Town, 12 November)
- Average home league attendance: 21,325
- Biggest win: 5–2 (vs. Reading, 21 September)
- Biggest defeat: 0–5 (vs. Stockport County, 9 November)
Home colours

The 2024–25 season is the 136th season in the history of Bolton Wanderers Football Club and their fourth consecutive season in League One, having lost the previous season's play off final. In addition to the domestic league, the club also participated in the FA Cup, the EFL Cup, and the EFL Trophy. Once again, Bolton's kits were decided via fan voting.

== Squad ==
=== First team ===
As of 29 April 2025

Note: Flags indicate national team as defined under FIFA eligibility rules; some limited exceptions apply. Players may hold more than one non-FIFA nationality.

| No. | Pos. | Nation | Player |
|---|---|---|---|
| 1 | GK | ENG | Nathan Baxter |
| 2 | DF | AUS | Gethin Jones |
| 3 | DF | IRL | Alex Murphy (on loan from Newcastle United) |
| 4 | MF | ENG | George Thomason (captain) |
| 5 | DF | POR | Ricardo Santos |
| 6 | DF | SCO | George Johnston |
| 7 | FW | GBS | Carlos Mendes Gomes |
| 8 | MF | WAL | Josh Sheehan |
| 9 | FW | NGR | Victor Adeboyejo |
| 12 | DF | ENG | Josh Dacres-Cogley |
| 13 | GK | ENG | Joel Coleman |
| 14 | DF | ENG | Jordi Osei-Tutu |
| 15 | DF | ENG | Will Forrester |
| 16 | MF | ENG | Aaron Morley |

| No. | Pos. | Nation | Player |
|---|---|---|---|
| 17 | MF | GRE | Klaidi Lolos |
| 18 | DF | NIR | Eoin Toal |
| 19 | FW | WAL | Aaron Collins |
| 20 | GK | NIR | Luke Southwood |
| 21 | DF | LCA | Chris Forino-Joseph |
| 22 | MF | ENG | Kyle Dempsey |
| 23 | MF | HUN | Szabolcs Schön |
| 28 | MF | ENG | Jay Matete (on loan from Sunderland) |
| 29 | FW | ENG | Kion Etete (on loan from Cardiff City) |
| 31 | MF | ENG | Joel Randall |
| 40 | GK | ENG | Luke Hutchinson |
| 41 | DF | ENG | Luke Matheson |
| 45 | FW | ENG | John McAtee |
| 48 | MF | EGY | Sonny Sharples-Ahmed |

=== Bolton B squad ===
As of 29 April 2025

Note: Flags indicate national team as defined under FIFA eligibility rules; some limited exceptions apply. Players may hold more than one non-FIFA nationality.

| No. | Pos. | Nation | Player |
|---|---|---|---|
| 30 | FW | IRL | Mark Isong |
| 32 | FW | SCO | Ben Andreucci |
| 33 | DF | ENG | Ajay Weston |
| 42 | GK | SCO | Jack Dallimore |
| 44 | DF | ENG | Sean Hogan |
| 52 | DF | NIR | Sam Inwood |
| — | GK | ENG | Ellis Litherland |

| No. | Pos. | Nation | Player |
|---|---|---|---|
| — | DF | ENG | Noah Halford |
| — | DF | ENG | Joseph O'Toole |
| — | MF | ENG | Harrison Fleury |
| — | MF | ENG | Andrew Tutte (Player-coach) |
| — | MF | ENG | James Westwood |
| — | FW | JAM | Trevon Bryan |
| — | FW | ENG | Yestin Shakespear |

=== Out on loan ===
Note: Flags indicate national team as defined under FIFA eligibility rules; some limited exceptions apply. Players may hold more than one non-FIFA nationality.

| No. | Pos. | Nation | Player |
|---|---|---|---|
| 11 | FW | ENG | Dan Nlundulu (on loan at Cambridge United until 30 June 2025) |
| 34 | DF | ENG | Max Conway (on loan at Crewe Alexandra until 30 June 2025) |

| No. | Pos. | Nation | Player |
|---|---|---|---|
| 35 | MF | ENG | Dubem Eze (on loan at FC Halifax Town until 30 May 2025) |

== Transfers ==
=== In ===
| Date | Pos. | Player | From | Fee | Ref |
|---|---|---|---|---|---|
| 28 June 2024 | AM | Klaidi Lolos (GRE) | Crawley Town (ENG) | Undisclosed | |
| 1 July 2024 | AM | Dubem Eze (ENG) (Note: Signed initially for the 'B' team) | Norwich City (ENG) | Free | |
| 1 July 2024 (Note: The transfer was announced on 14 June, and would become official on 1 July once his Wycombe Wanderers contract expired) | CB | Chris Forino-Joseph (LCA) | Wycombe Wanderers (ENG) | Free | |
| 1 July 2024 (Note: The transfer was announced on 21 June, and would become official on 1 July once his Cheltenham Town contract expired) | GK | Luke Southwood (NIR) | Cheltenham Town (ENG) | Free | |
| 2 July 2024 | LWB | Ajay Weston (ENG) | Hull City (ENG) | Free | |
| 12 July 2024 | AM | Scott Arfield (CAN) | Charlotte FC (USA) | Free | |
| 2 August 2024 | LWB | Szabolcs Schön (HUN) | Fehérvár (HUN) | Undisclosed (Note: The transfer was reported to be around £800,000 by The Bolton News.) | |
| 8 August 2024 | RWB | Jordi Osei-Tutu (ENG) | Bochum (GER) | Undisclosed | |
| 9 August 2024 | CF | John McAtee (ENG) | Luton Town (ENG) | Undisclosed | |
| 2 September 2024 | CF | Mark Isong (IRL) | Shelbourne (IRL) | Undisclosed | |
| 9 January 2025 | AM | Joel Randall (ENG) | Peterborough United (ENG) | Undisclosed | |

=== Out ===
| Date | Pos. | Player | To | Fee | Ref |
|---|---|---|---|---|---|
| 30 July 2024 | RWB | Wes Frimpong (NED) | LASK (AUT) | Training Fee | |
| 30 August 2024 | LB | Jack Iredale (AUS) | Hibernian (SCO) | Undisclosed | |
| 15 January 2025 | CF | Conor Carty (IRL) | St Patrick's Athletic (IRL) | Undisclosed | |
| 15 January 2025 | CF | Dion Charles (NIR) | Huddersfield Town (ENG) | Undisclosed | |
| 17 January 2025 | CM | Nelson Khumbeni (MWI) | Gillingham (ENG) | Undisclosed | |
| 3 February 2025 | LM | Randell Williams (ENG) | Leyton Orient (ENG) | Free | |
| 3 February 2025 | AM | Scott Arfield (CAN) | Falkirk (SCO) | Free | |
| 29 March 2025 | CB | Charlie Hayes-Green (ENG) | FC Halifax Town (ENG) | Undisclosed | |

=== Loaned in ===
| Date | Pos. | Player | From | Date until | Ref |
|---|---|---|---|---|---|
| 8 August 2024 | DM | Jay Matete (ENG) | Sunderland (ENG) | End of season | |
| 20 January 2025 | LB | Alex Murphy (IRL) | Newcastle United (ENG) | End of season | |
| 31 January 2025 | CF | Kion Etete (ENG) | Cardiff City (WAL) | End of Season | |

=== Loaned out ===
| Date | Pos. | Player | To | Date until | Ref |
|---|---|---|---|---|---|
| 12 July 2024 | GK | Luke Hutchinson (ENG) | Marine (ENG) | 4 October 2024 (Note: On 4 October, Hutchinson was recalled early from his season-long loan.) | |
| 5 August 2024 | CB | Charlie Hayes-Green (ENG) | Clitheroe (ENG) | 26 November 2024 (Note: On 25 September, Hayes-Green's loan was extended.) | |
| 9 August 2024 | LWB | Max Conway (ENG) | Crewe Alexandra (ENG) | End of Season | |
| 9 August 2024 | GK | Ellis Litherland (ENG) | Atherton Collieries (ENG) | 12 October 2024 | |
| 16 August 2024 | CM | Nelson Khumbeni (MWI) | Accrington Stanley (ENG) | 15 January 2025 | |
| 23 August 2024 | CM | Aaron Morley (ENG) | Wycombe Wanderers (ENG) | 1 January 2025 (Note: On 1 January, Morley was recalled early from his season-long loan.) | |
| 23 August 2024 | CF | Yestin Shakespear (ENG) | Workington (ENG) | 3 months | |
| 30 August 2024 | CF | Dan Nlundulu (ENG) | Cambridge United (ENG) | End of Season | |
| 7 September 2024 | LW | Trevon Bryan (JAM) | Ashton United (ENG) | 13 January 2025 (Note: On 5 October, Bryan's loan was extended for another 28 days. On 12 December, his loan was extended until the beginning of February. On 13 January, he was recalled from his loan.) | |
| 13 September 2024 | CF | Ben Andreucci (SCO) | Buxton (ENG) | 1 January 2025 | |
| 20 September 2024 | CB | Joseph O'Toole (ENG) | Hyde United (ENG) | 9 November 2024 | |
| 11 October 2024 | AM | Dubem Eze (ENG) | Chorley (ENG) | 25 March 2025 (Note: On 12 November, Eze's loan was extended until January. On 8 January, his loan was extended again until the end of the season. On 25 March, Eze was recalled from his loan.) | |
| 26 October 2024 | CB | Noah Halford (ENG) | Warrington Town (ENG) | 1 month | |
| 16 November 2024 | CB | Sean Hogan (ENG) | Ashton United (ENG) | Short Term | |
| 28 November 2024 | CB | Noah Halford (ENG) | FC United of Manchester (ENG) | 8 March 2025 (Note: On 7 January, Halford's loan was extended until February.) | |
| 28 November 2024 | CB | Charlie Hayes-Green (ENG) | FC United of Manchester (ENG) | End of Season (Note: On 7 January, Hayes-Green's loan was extended until the end of the season. On 29 March, Hayes-Green was recalled from his loan.) | |
| 28 January 2025 | LW | Trevon Bryan (JAM) | Marine (ENG) | 26 February 2025 | |
| 22 February 2025 | RB | Luke Matheson (ENG) | Alfreton Town (ENG) | End of Season | |
| 7 March 2025 | CF | Ben Andreucci (SCO) | Darlington (ENG) | End of Season | |
| 22 March 2025 | GK | Ellis Litherland (ENG) | Matlock Town (ENG) | End of Season | |
| 25 March 2025 | AM | Dubem Eze (ENG) | FC Halifax Town (ENG) | End of Season | |
| 29 March 2025 | GK | Jack Dallimore (SCO) | Guiseley (ENG) | End of Season | |
| 29 March 2025 | CB | Sean Hogan (ENG) | Ashton United (ENG) | End of Season | |
| 29 March 2025 | RM | James Westwood (ENG) | Ashton United (ENG) | End of Season | |
| 11 April 2025 | GK | Luke Hutchinson (ENG) | Crawley Town (ENG) | 18 April 2025 | |

=== Released / Out of Contract ===
| Date | Pos. | Player | Subsequent club | Join date | Ref. |
|---|---|---|---|---|---|
| 30 June 2024 | GK | Jack Flint (ENG) | Flint Town United (WAL) | 1 July 2024 (Note: The transfer was announced on 25 May, and would become official on 1 July once his contract expired) | |
| 30 June 2024 | CB | Eric Yoro (IRL) | Longford Town (IRL) | 4 July 2024 | |
| 30 June 2024 | CM | Matthew Tweedley (ENG) | Nantwich Town (ENG) | 1 August 2024 | |
| 30 June 2024 | CF | Gerald Sithole (ENG) | Warrington Town (ENG) | 8 August 2024 | |
| 30 June 2024 | AM | Gio Loureiro (POR) | Nantwich Town (ENG) | 20 August 2024 | |
| 30 June 2024 | CF | Jón Daði Böðvarsson (ISL) | Wrexham (WAL) | 25 October 2024 | |
| 30 June 2024 | LB | Declan John (WAL) | St Mirren (SCO) | 12 November 2024 | |
| 30 June 2024 | CF | Cameron Jerome (ENG) | Retired | | |
| 30 June 2024 | LW | Finlay Lockett (ENG) | | | |
| 30 June 2024 | CB | Lamine Toure (ENG) | | | |

== Pre-season and friendlies ==
On 4 June 2024, the club announced their first set of pre-season fixtures, welcoming Stoke City at home and facing Port Vale away. A third friendly against Middlesbrough, to be played at Bishop Auckland, was added three days later. The first pre-season friendly for the B-Team was announced on 11 June, facing Stoke City U21s. On 17 June, another fixture was announced against Chorley. Another B-Team fixture was added on 19 June against Workington. On 20 June, a home friendly against Italian side Fiorentina was added. On 25 June, a behind-closed-doors friendly was added against West Bromwich Albion, to be played at St George's Park. The same day, a fixture against Atherton Collieries was added for the B-Team.

Win Draw Loss Fixtures

| 13 July 2024 Friendly | West Bromwich Albion | 1–2 | Bolton Wanderers | Burton upon Trent |
| 14:00 BST | Thomas-Asante | Report | Dempsey; Collins | Stadium: St George's Park |

| 20 July 2024 Friendly | Middlesbrough | 3–0 | Bolton Wanderers | Bishop Auckland |
| 14:00 BST | Latte Lath 65'; Finch 75'; Burgzorg 86' (pen.) | Report | | Stadium: Heritage Park; Attendance: 1,560; Referee: Geoff Eltringham |

| 23 July 2024 Friendly | Chorley | 0–4 | Bolton Wanderers | Chorley |
| 19:30 BST | | Report | Morley 3' (pen.); Sampson 47' (o.g.); Khumbeni 49'; Adeboyejo 69' (pen.) | Stadium: Victory Park; Attendance: 2,455; Referee: Mike Crushma |

| 23 July 2024 Friendly | Runcorn Linnets | 3–2 | Bolton Wanderers B | Runcorn |
| 19:30 BST | Welsh 16'; Trialist 61'; Moseley 85' | Report | Wylie 35' (o.g.); Eze 54' | Stadium: APEC Taxis Stadium |

| 26 July 2024 Friendly | Bolton Wanderers | 1–1 | Fiorentina | Bolton |
| 19:30 BST | Adeboyejo 66' | Report | Brekalo 18' | Stadium: Toughsheet Community Stadium; Attendance: 6,862; Referee: Bobby Madley |

| 30 July 2024 Friendly | Bolton Wanderers | 0–1 | Stoke City | Bolton |
| 19:30 BST | | Report | Manhoef 34' | Stadium: Toughsheet Community Stadium; Attendance: 3,512; Referee: Tom Kirk |

| 30 July 2024 Friendly | Workington | 1–0 | Bolton Wanderers B | Workington |
| 19:30 BST | Rigg 55' | Report | | Stadium: Borough Park |

| 3 August 2024 Friendly | Port Vale | 0–3 | Bolton Wanderers | Burslem |
| 15:00 BST | | Report | Collins 2'; Adeboyejo 32'; Charles 75' | Stadium: Vale Park |

| 3 August 2024 Friendly | Atherton Collieries | 2–2 | Bolton Wanderers B | Atherton |
| 15:00 BST | Dawson 60'; Trialist 81' | Report | Trialist 10'; Inwood 58' | Stadium: Skuna Stadium |

| 6 August 2024 Friendly | Stoke City U21 | 1–1 | Bolton Wanderers B | Stoke-on-Trent |
| 13:00 BST | McGuinness 75' | Report | Charles 23' (pen.) | Stadium: Clayton Wood |

== Competitions ==
=== Overall record ===
| Competition | First match | Last match | Starting round | Final position | Record | | | | | | | |
| Competition | First match | Last match | Starting round | Final position | Pld | W | D | L | GF | GA | GD | Win % |
|---|---|---|---|---|---|---|---|---|---|---|---|---|
| League One | 10 August 2024 | 3 May 2025 | Matchday 1 | 8th | 46 | 20 | 8 | 18 | 67 | 70 | −3 | 43.48 |
| FA Cup | 2 November 2024 | 2 November 2024 | First round | First round | 1 | 0 | 0 | 1 | 1 | 2 | −1 | 0.00 |
| EFL Cup | 13 August 2024 | 25 September 2024 | First round | Third round | 3 | 1 | 1 | 1 | 4 | 6 | −2 | 33.33 |
| EFL Trophy | 3 September 2024 | 11 February 2025 | Group stage | Quarter-final | 6 | 4 | 1 | 1 | 10 | 6 | +4 | 66.67 |
| Total | | | | | 56 | 25 | 10 | 21 | 82 | 84 | −2 | 44.64 |

Last updated: 3 May 2025
Source: Soccerway

=== League One ===
==== League table ====
| Pos | Team | Pld | W | D | L | GF | GA | GD | Pts | Promotion, qualification or relegation |
|---|---|---|---|---|---|---|---|---|---|---|
| 6 | Leyton Orient | 46 | 24 | 6 | 16 | 72 | 48 | +24 | 78 | Qualification for League One play-offs |
| 7 | Reading | 46 | 21 | 12 | 13 | 68 | 57 | +11 | 75 | |
| 8 | Bolton Wanderers | 46 | 20 | 8 | 18 | 67 | 70 | −3 | 68 | |
| 9 | Blackpool | 46 | 17 | 16 | 13 | 72 | 60 | +12 | 67 | |
| 10 | Huddersfield Town | 46 | 19 | 7 | 20 | 58 | 55 | +3 | 64 | |

Source: EFL Official Website
Rules for classification: 1) Points; 2) Goal difference; 3) Number of goals scored; 4) Head-to-head results; 5) Wins; 6) Away goals; 7) Penalty points (sec 9.5); 8) 12-point sending off offences

==== Results summary ====
| Overall | | | | | | | | Home | | | | | | Away | | | | | |
| Pld | W | D | L | GF | GA | GD | Pts | W | D | L | GF | GA | GD | W | D | L | GF | GA | GD |
|---|---|---|---|---|---|---|---|---|---|---|---|---|---|---|---|---|---|---|---|
| 46 | 20 | 8 | 18 | 67 | 70 | −3 | 68 | 11 | 4 | 7 | 36 | 32 | +4 | 9 | 4 | 11 | 31 | 38 | −7 |

Last updated: 3 May 2025.
Source: Soccerway

==== Results by round ====
| Round | 1 | 2 | 3 | 4 | 6 | 7 | 8 | 9 | 10 | 12 | 13 | 14 | 11^{2} | 15 | 17 | 5^{1} | 18 | 20 | 21 | 22 | 23 | 24 | 25 | 16^{3} | 27 | 26^{5} | 28 | 29 | 30 | 31 | 32 | 33 | 34 | 35 | 36 | 19^{4} | 37 | 39 | 40 | 41 | 38^{6} | 42 | 43 | 44 | 45 | 46 |
|---|---|---|---|---|---|---|---|---|---|---|---|---|---|---|---|---|---|---|---|---|---|---|---|---|---|---|---|---|---|---|---|---|---|---|---|---|---|---|---|---|---|---|---|---|---|---|
| Ground | A | H | A | H | H | H | A | A | H | H | A | H | A | A | H | A | H | H | A | H | H | A | A | A | H | H | A | H | A | H | A | H | A | H | A | A | H | A | A | H | H | A | H | A | A | H |
| Result | W | D | L | L | L | W | W | W | D | W | L | W | W | L | W | D | W | L | D | L | W | L | W | L | D | L | W | W | L | W | W | W | D | W | W | L | L | L | W | W | L | L | L | L | D | D |
| Position | 5 | 9 | 13 | 18 | 21 | 18 | 14 | 11 | 13 | 11 | 14 | 9 | 6 | 10 | 9 | 8 | 7 | 8 | 7 | 11 | 8 | 10 | 10 | 10 | 9 | 9 | 9 | 7 | 9 | 7 | 8 | 8 | 7 | 7 | 6 | 6 | 7 | 8 | 6 | 6 | 7 | 8 | 8 | 8 | 8 | 8 |
| Points | 3 | 4 | 4 | 4 | 4 | 7 | 10 | 13 | 14 | 17 | 17 | 20 | 23 | 23 | 26 | 27 | 30 | 30 | 31 | 31 | 34 | 34 | 37 | 37 | 38 | 38 | 41 | 44 | 44 | 47 | 50 | 53 | 54 | 57 | 60 | 60 | 60 | 60 | 63 | 66 | 66 | 66 | 66 | 66 | 67 | 68 |

Updated to match(es) played on 3 May 2025. Source: Soccerway
W = Win; D = Draw; L = Loss; P = Postponed
Notes:
- ^{1} Matchday 5 (vs. Cambridge United) was postponed due to international call-ups.
- ^{2} Matchday 11 (vs. Stevenage) was postponed due to international call-ups.
- ^{3} Matchday 16 (vs. Rotherham United) was postponed due to international call-ups.
- ^{4} Matchday 19 (vs. Bristol Rovers) was postponed due to Storm Darragh.
- ^{5} Matchday 26 (vs. Charlton Athletic) was postponed due Charlton's FA Cup involvements.
- ^{6} Matchday 38 (vs. Rotherham United) was postponed due to international call-ups.

==== Matches ====
On 26 June, the League One fixtures were announced. It sees Bolton open their campaign on 10 August away at Leyton Orient, with the regular season concluding on 3 May, at home against Stevenage.

Win Draw Loss Fixtures

| 10 August 2024 1 | Leyton Orient | 1–2 | Bolton Wanderers | Leyton |
| 17:30 BST | Kelman 38'; Galbraith (yellow card) 54'; Beckles (yellow card) 62'; Sweeney (yellow card) 74'; Happe (yellow card) 87' | Report | Charles 8'; Adeboyejo 75'; Baxter (yellow card) 90+5'; Osei-Tutu (yellow card) 90+7' | Stadium: Brisbane Road; Attendance: 7,835; Referee: Charles Breakspear |

| 18 August 2024 2 | Bolton Wanderers | 0–0 | Wrexham | Horwich |
| 15:00 BST | Santos (yellow card) 50'; Schön (yellow card) 65' | Report | O’Connor (yellow card) 70' | Stadium: Toughsheet Community Stadium; Attendance: 25,957; Referee: Ben Speedie |
Note: Fixture was initially scheduled for 17 August, but was moved for live Sky Sports broadcast.

| 24 August 2024 3 | Charlton Athletic | 2–0 | Bolton Wanderers | Charlton |
| 15:00 BST | Berry (yellow card) 8'; Coventry (yellow card) 8'; Docherty 10'; Mitchell (yellow card) 60'; Godden 88' | Report | Schön (yellow card) 61'; Matete (yellow card) 83'; Toal (yellow card) 83' | Stadium: The Valley; Attendance: 14,365; Referee: Lee Swabey |

| 31 August 2024 4 | Bolton Wanderers | 0–2 | Exeter City | Horwich |
| 15:00 BST | Santos (yellow card) 23'; Johnston (yellow card) 66'; Matete (yellow card) 82'; Dacres-Cogley (yellow card) 90+1' | Report | Sweeney (yellow card) 9'; Doyle 34'; Alli 49'; Niskanen (yellow card) 53'; Whitworth (yellow card) 69'; Cole (yellow card) 81'; Yfeko (yellow card) 90+1' | Stadium: Toughsheet Community Stadium; Attendance: 22,086; Referee: Ben Toner |

| 14 September 2024 6 | Bolton Wanderers | 0–4 | Huddersfield Town | Horwich |
| 15:00 BST | Thomason (yellow card) 37' | Report | Koroma 44', 59'; Hogg (yellow card) 47'; Wiles 68'; Evans 81' | Stadium: Toughsheet Community Stadium; Attendance: 22,532; Referee: Alex Chilowicz |

| 21 September 2024 7 | Bolton Wanderers | 5–2 | Reading | Horwich |
| 15:00 BST | Sheehan 12'; Santos (yellow card) 16'; Charles 21' (pen.), 34', 45+5' (pen.); Baxter (yellow card) 81'; Dempsey 87'; Williams (yellow card) 88'; Arfield (yellow card) 90+1' | Report | Wing (yellow card) 11'; Elliott 41'; Smith 57' (pen.); Knibbs (yellow card) 71' | Stadium: Toughsheet Community Stadium; Attendance: 19,635; Referee: Sebastian Stockbridge |

| 28 September 2024 8 | Crawley Town | 0–2 | Bolton Wanderers | Crawley |
| 12:30 BST | Kelly (yellow card) 86'; Mukena (yellow card) 90+5' | Report | Dempsey 5'; Adeboyejo (yellow card) 27'; Thomason (yellow card) 59'; McAtee 78'; Collins (yellow card) 90+3' | Stadium: Broadfield Stadium; Attendance: 4,696; Referee: Jacob Miles |

| 1 October 2024 9 | Northampton Town | 2–4 | Bolton Wanderers | Northampton |
| 19:45 BST | McGeehan (yellow card) 10'; Chouchane (yellow card) 37'; Roberts (yellow card) 67'; Pinnock (yellow card) 87'; Eaves 90+1'; Guthrie 90+3' | Report | McAtee 6'; Thomason (yellow card) 17', (goal) 23'; Schön (yellow card) 33'; Toal 60'; Charles 83'; Matete (yellow card) 90+2'; Williams (yellow card) 90+5' | Stadium: Sixfields Stadium; Attendance: 5,730; Referee: Matthew Corlett |

| 5 October 2024 10 | Bolton Wanderers | 2–2 | Shrewsbury Town | Horwich |
| 15:00 BST | Dempsey 47'; Schön 61' | Report | Pierre (yellow card) 15'; Feeney 20', (yellow card) 34'; Shipley 28'; Savin (yellow card) 66'; Gilliead (yellow card) 78'; Ojo (yellow card) 78' | Stadium: Toughsheet Community Stadium; Attendance: 19,765; Referee: Scott Oldham |

| 19 October 2024 12 | Bolton Wanderers | 2–1 | Burton Albion | Horwich |
| 15:00 BST | Johnston (yellow card) 47'; Collins 61'; Williams 63', (yellow card) 85' | Report | Bennett (yellow card) 24'; Orsi 66'; Whitfield (yellow card) 86'; Sweeney (yellow card) 90+1' | Stadium: Toughsheet Community Stadium; Attendance: 19,540; Referee: Scott Simpson |

| 22 October 2024 13 | Birmingham City | 2–0 | Bolton Wanderers | Birmingham |
| 19:45 BST | Iwata 3'; Stansfield 83' (pen.); Klarer (yellow card) 87' | Report | Dempsey (yellow card) 18'; Dacres-Cogley (yellow card) 24'; Matete (yellow card) 39'; McAtee (yellow card) 78' | Stadium: St Andrew's; Attendance: 25,793; Referee: Stephen Martin |

| 26 October 2024 14 | Bolton Wanderers | 1–0 | Peterborough United | Horwich |
| 15:00 BST | Adeboyejo (yellow card) 50'; Schön (yellow card) 52'; Lolos 90+9', (yellow card) 90+10' | Report | Curtis (yellow card) 69'; Ihionvien (yellow card) 85'; Fernandez (yellow card) 88' de Havilland (yellow card) 90+8' | Stadium: Toughsheet Community Stadium; Attendance: 20,022; Referee: Ollie Yates |

| 29 October 2024 11 | Stevenage | 1–4 | Bolton Wanderers | Stevenage |
| 19:45 GMT | Phillips (yellow card) 67'; Kemp 70'; Wildin (yellow card) 80'; Butler (yellow card) 84' | Report | Santos 13', (yellow card) 73'; McAtee 16'; Sheehan (yellow card) 31'; Johnston (yellow card) 59'; Adeboyejo 61'; Southwood (yellow card) 78'; Charles 88' | Stadium: Lamex Stadium; Attendance: 3,611; Referee: Carl Brook |
Note: Fixture was initially scheduled for 12 October, but was moved due to international call-ups.

| 9 November 2024 15 | Stockport County | 5–0 | Bolton Wanderers | Stockport |
| 15:00 GMT | Collar 30', (yellow card) 67'; Wootton 47'; Horsfall 55'; Barry 62'; Bailey 90' | Report | | Stadium: Edgeley Park; Attendance: 10,342; Referee: David Rock |

| 23 November 2024 17 | Bolton Wanderers | 2–1 | Blackpool | Horwich |
| 12:30 GMT | Thomason (yellow card) 35', (goal) 53'; Sheehan (yellow card) 45+3'; Schön (yellow card) 50'; Johnston (yellow card) 85'; Collins 90+4', (yellow card) 90+5' | Report | Joseph 32', (yellow card) 52'; Norburn (yellow card) 57'; Ashworth (yellow card) 79'; Evans (yellow card) 88'; Ballard (yellow card) 90' | Stadium: Toughsheet Community Stadium; Attendance: 22,479; Referee: Edward Duckworth |
Note: Fixture was initially scheduled for a 15:00 kick-off, but was moved for live Sky Sports broadcast.

| 26 November 2024 5 | Cambridge United | 1–1 | Bolton Wanderers | Cambridge |
| 19:45 GMT | Njoku (yellow card) 44'; Okedina (red card) 49'; Smith (yellow card) 59'; Kaikai 89' | Report | Thomason (yellow card) 17'; Sheehan (yellow card) 54'; Collins 59'; Osei-Tutu (yellow card) 77'; Baxter (yellow card) 88'; Jones (yellow card) 90+4' | Stadium: Cledara Abbey Stadium; Attendance: 5,266; Referee: Paul Howard |
Note: Fixture was initially scheduled for 7 September, but was moved due to international call-ups.

| 3 December 2024 18 | Bolton Wanderers | 3–1 | Mansfield Town | Horwich |
| 19:45 GMT | Collins (yellow card) 51'; Charles 75'; Adeboyejo 80'; McAtee 85' | Report | Boateng 34', (yellow card) 59' (yellow-red card) 70'; Bowery (yellow card) 46'; Evans (yellow card) 59'; Oshilaja (yellow card) 90+1' | Stadium: Toughsheet Community Stadium; Attendance: 19,823; Referee: Seb Stockbridge |

| 14 December 2024 20 | Bolton Wanderers | 0–2 | Wigan Athletic | Horwich |
| 12:30 GMT | Johnston (yellow card) 9'; Santos (yellow card) 14'; Thomason (yellow card) 37' | Report | Taylor 18', (yellow card) 77'; Smith (yellow card) 20'; Sessegnon (yellow card) 26'; Aasgaard 67'; Carragher (yellow card) 72' | Stadium: Toughsheet Community Stadium; Attendance: 24,448; Referee: Adam Herczeg |
Note: Fixture was initially scheduled for a 15:00 kick-off, but was moved for live Sky Sports broadcast.

| 20 December 2024 21 | Wycombe Wanderers | 0–0 | Bolton Wanderers | High Wycombe |
| 19:45 GMT | Hartridge (yellow card) 82' | Report | Matete (yellow card) 65'; Lolos (yellow card) 75'; Williams (yellow card) 90+2' | Stadium: Adams Park; Attendance: 6,119; Referee: Stephen Martin |
Note: Fixture was initially scheduled for 21 December, but was moved following an agreement between the two sides.

| 26 December 2024 22 | Bolton Wanderers | 1–2 | Barnsley | Horwich |
| 15:00 GMT | Lolos 26', (yellow card) 58'; Thomason (yellow card) 75'; Williams (yellow card) 75'; Charles (yellow card) 90' | Report | McCarthy (yellow card) 42'; Cotter (yellow card) 76'; Keillor-Dunn 80'; Nwakali (yellow card) 85'; Phillips 89'; Yoganathan (yellow card) 90+4' | Stadium: Toughsheet Community Stadium; Attendance: 22,215; Referee: Thomas Kirk |

| 29 December 2024 23 | Bolton Wanderers | 3–0 | Lincoln City | Horwich |
| 15:00 GMT | Collins 37'; Matete 50', 66' | Report | McGrandles (yellow card) 18'; House (yellow card) 23'; O'Connor (yellow card) 44'; Erhahon (yellow card) 45+1' (yellow-red card) 45+3' | Stadium: Toughsheet Community Stadium; Attendance: 22,395; Referee: Ross Joyce |

| 1 January 2025 24 | Mansfield Town | 2–1 | Bolton Wanderers | Mansfield |
| 15:00 GMT | McLaughlin 20', (yellow card) 78'; Gregory 36', (yellow card) 54'; Cargill (yellow card) 59'; Lewis (yellow card) 89' | Report | Dacres-Cogley (yellow card) 14'; Collins 40'; Schön (yellow card) 54'; Santos (yellow card) 72'; Williams (yellow card) 74'; Osei-Tutu (yellow card) 89' | Stadium: One Call Stadium; Attendance: 8,553; Referee: Anthony Backhouse |

| 4 January 2025 25 | Exeter City | 1–2 | Bolton Wanderers | Exeter |
| 15:00 GMT | Mitchell 54'; Richards (yellow card) 63'; McMillan (yellow card) 90' | Report | Schön (yellow card) 22'; Thomason (yellow card) 51'; Williams (yellow card) 62'; McAtee (yellow card) 81'; Collins 88'; Morley 90+1'; Forrester (yellow card) 90+5' | Stadium: St James Park; Attendance: 6,353; Referee: Ben Speedie |

| 11 January 2025 16 | Rotherham United | 3–1 | Bolton Wanderers | Rotherham |
| 12:30 GMT | Humphreys (yellow card) 15'; Wilks 34' (pen.); James 45+6'; Nombe 76' | Report | Santos (yellow card) 33'; McAtee 86' | Stadium: AESSEAL New York Stadium; Attendance: 10,258; Referee: Alan Young |
Note: Fixture was initially scheduled for 16 November, but was moved due to international call-ups to 21 January. Due to Bolton's original 11 January opponents Charlton Athletic being involved in the FA Cup 3rd Round, it was moved again to 11 January.

| 18 January 2025 27 | Bolton Wanderers | 2–2 | Cambridge United | Horwich |
| 15:00 GMT | McAtee 34', (yellow card) 43'; Collins (yellow card) 35'; Sheehan (yellow card) 76'; Ibsen Rossi 90' (o.g.) | Report | Stokes 4'; Kachunga 36', (yellow card) 40'; Andrew (yellow card) 68' | Stadium: Toughsheet Community Stadium; Attendance: 19,946; Referee: Tom Nield |

| 21 January 2025 26 | Bolton Wanderers | 1–2 | Charlton Athletic | Horwich |
| 19:45 GMT | Thomason (yellow card) 45+5'; Randall 55'; Osei-Tutu (yellow card) 74'; Matete (yellow card) 90+5' | Report | Mitchell (yellow card) 14'; Docherty (yellow card) 34'; Jones 71'; Small (yellow card) 74'; Anderson 86'; Campbell (yellow card) 90+4' | Stadium: Toughsheet Community Stadium; Attendance: 18,477; Referee: Jacob Miles |
Note: Fixture was initially scheduled for 11 January, but was postponed due to Charlton Athletic's involvement in the FA Cup Third Round.

| 25 January 2025 28 | Huddersfield Town | 0–1 | Bolton Wanderers | Huddersfield |
| 12:30 GMT | Spencer (yellow card) 43'; Sørensen (yellow card) 64' | Report | Dacres-Cogley (yellow card) 41'; Collins 55'; Schön (yellow card) 64'; Johnston (yellow card) 89'; Morley (yellow card) 90+3'; Osei-Tutu (yellow card) 90+4' | Stadium: John Smith's Stadium; Attendance: 19,999; Referee: Paul Howard |
Note: Fixture was initially scheduled for a 15:00 kick-off, but was moved for live Sky Sports broadcast.

| 28 January 2025 29 | Bolton Wanderers | 3–1 | Northampton Town | Horwich |
| 19:45 GMT | Thomason 3'; Sheehan (yellow card) 41'; Shaw 44' (o.g.); Collins 83' | Report | Shaw 8', (yellow card) 36'; Taylor (yellow card) 31' | Stadium: Toughsheet Community Stadium; Attendance: 18,956; Referee: Sunny Singh Gill |

| 1 February 2025 30 | Reading | 1–0 | Bolton Wanderers | Reading |
| 15:00 GMT | Craig (yellow card) 81'; Knibbs 89' (pen.) | Report | Thomason (yellow card) 74'; Southwood (yellow card) 89'; Toal (yellow card) 90+7' | Stadium: Select Car Leasing Stadium; Attendance: 11,508; Referee: Anthony Backhouse |

| 8 February 2025 31 | Bolton Wanderers | 4–3 | Crawley Town | Horwich |
| 15:00 GMT | Sheehan (yellow card) 22', (goal) 85'; Osei-Tutu 52'; Murphy 68'; Barker 90+9' (o.g.) | Report | Hepburn-Murphy 50', 62'; Swan 54'; Radcliffe (yellow card) 61'; Barker (yellow card) 72'; Feely (yellow card) 84' (yellow-red card) 89'; Showunmi (yellow card) 90+8' | Stadium: Toughsheet Community Stadium; Attendance: 20,384; Referee: Alex Chilowicz |

| 15 February 2025 32 | Shrewsbury Town | 2–3 | Bolton Wanderers | Shrewsbury |
| 15:00 GMT | Oliver 20'; Hoole (yellow card) 31', (goal) 90+4'; Gilliead (yellow card) 66' | Report | Toal 59'; Matete (yellow card) 62'; McAtee 63', 79'; Sheehan (yellow card) 70' | Stadium: The Croud Meadow; Attendance: 8,613; Referee: James Durkin |

| 22 February 2025 33 | Bolton Wanderers | 2–1 | Leyton Orient | Horwich |
| 15:00 GMT | McAtee 60'; Forrester (yellow card) 65'; Morley 75' (pen.); Forino-Joseph (yellow card) 90+7' | Report | Kelman 40', (yellow card) 72'; Galbraith (yellow card) 66'; Keeley (yellow card) 75' | Stadium: Toughsheet Community Stadium; Attendance: 20,851; Referee: Sam Purkiss |

| 1 March 2025 34 | Wrexham | 0–0 | Bolton Wanderers | Wrexham |
| 12:30 GMT | James (yellow card) 13'; Dobson (yellow card) 58' | Report | Osei-Tutu (yellow card) 68'; Dacres-Cogley (yellow card) 72'; Forrester (yellow card) 90+3' | Stadium: STōK Cae Ras; Attendance: 13,284; Referee: Declan Bourne |
Note: Fixture was initially scheduled for a 15:00 kick-off, but was moved for live Sky Sports broadcasting.

| 4 March 2025 35 | Bolton Wanderers | 3–1 | Birmingham City | Horwich |
| 19:45 GMT | McAtee 39', (yellow card) 53'; Thomason 49'; Morley (yellow card) 61'; Collins 71'; Osei-Tutu (yellow card) 90+8'; Forino-Joseph (yellow card) 90+8'; Johnston (yellow card) 90+8' | Report | Hansson 23'; Gardner-Hickman (yellow card) 48'; Harris (yellow card) 90+8'; Klarer (yellow card) 90+9' | Stadium: Toughsheet Community Stadium; Attendance: 23,023; Referee: Thomas Kirk |

| 8 March 2025 36 | Burton Albion | 1–2 | Bolton Wanderers | Burton upon Trent |
| 15:00 GMT | McKiernan (yellow card) 29'; Armer (yellow card) 42'; Sweeney 53'; Lofthouse (yellow card) 61'; Bennett (yellow card) 79' | Report | Morley 22'; Sheehan (yellow card) 47', (goal) 60'; Murphy (yellow card) 76' | Stadium: Pirelli Stadium; Attendance: 4,172; Referee: Lee Swabey |

| 11 March 2025 19 | Bristol Rovers | 3–2 | Bolton Wanderers | Bristol |
| 19:45 GMT | Martin 6' (pen.), 63'; Taylor 88'; Forde (yellow card) 90+2'; Swinkels (yellow card) 90+4' | Report | Morley 38'; McAtee 70' | Stadium: Memorial Stadium; Attendance: 7,644; Referee: Carl Brook |
Note: Fixture was originally scheduled for 7 December but was postponed due to safety reasons as a result of Storm Darragh.

| 15 March 2025 37 | Bolton Wanderers | 0–1 | Stockport County | Horwich |
| 12:30 GMT | McAtee (yellow card) 45'; Matete (yellow card) 90+2' | Report | Knoyle (yellow card) 6'; Camps (yellow card) 60'; Bate (yellow card) 63'; Olaofe 72'; Moxon (yellow card) 84' | Stadium: Toughsheet Community Stadium; Attendance: 24,571; Referee: Ben Toner |
Note: Fixture was initially scheduled for a 15:00 kick-off, but was moved for live Sky Sports broadcasting.

| 29 March 2025 39 | Blackpool | 2–1 | Bolton Wanderers | Blackpool |
| 15:00 GMT | Fletcher 13'; Evans (yellow card) 40'; Husband (yellow card) 43'; Carey (yellow card) 53'; Ennis 59' | Report | McAtee (yellow card) 21'; Collins 35'; Morley (yellow card) 90+6' (yellow-red card) 90+7' | Stadium: Bloomfield Road; Attendance: 11,602; Referee: Graham Scott |

| 1 April 2025 40 | Wigan Athletic | 0–1 | Bolton Wanderers | Wigan |
| 19:45 BST | McHugh (yellow card) 24'; Dale (yellow card) 27'; Smith (yellow card) 64'; Aimson (yellow card) 65'; Asamoah (yellow card) 72'; McManaman (yellow card) 90+7' | Report | Forino-Joseph 90+2' | Stadium: Brick Community Stadium; Attendance: 15,445; Referee: Farai Hallam |

| 5 April 2025 41 | Bolton Wanderers | 1–0 | Bristol Rovers | Horwich |
| 15:00 BST | Collins 76' | Report | Butcher (yellow card) 30' | Stadium: Toughsheet Community Stadium; Attendance: 22,422; Referee: Anthony Backhouse |

| 8 April 2025 38 | Bolton Wanderers | 0–1 | Rotherham United | Horwich |
| 19:45 BST | Baxter (yellow card) 85' | Report | Nombe 11' | Stadium: Toughsheet Community Stadium; Attendance: 19,218; Referee: Ross Joyce |
Note: Fixture was initially scheduled for 22 March, but was moved due to international call-ups.

| 12 April 2025 42 | Barnsley | 4–1 | Bolton Wanderers | Barnsley |
| 15:00 BST | Russell 15', 86'; Kellior-Dunn (yellow card) 22'; Jaló 25', 71'; Connell (yellow card) 66' | Report | Collins 74'; Dempsey (yellow card) 85'; Lolos (yellow card) 90+2' | Stadium: Oakwell; Attendance: 13,685; Referee: Elliot Bell |

| 18 April 2025 43 | Bolton Wanderers | 0–2 | Wycombe Wanderers | Horwich |
| 15:00 BST | Matete (yellow card) 57'; Johnston (yellow card) 68' | Report | Taylor 58'; Grimmer (yellow card) 68'; Leahy (yellow card) 80', (goal) 90+4' | Stadium: Toughsheet Community Stadium; Attendance: 21,114; Referee: Adam Herczeg |

| 21 April 2025 44 | Lincoln City | 4–2 | Bolton Wanderers | Lincoln |
| 15:00 BST | Ring 10'; Collins 18' (pen.), 53'; Hackett 61'; Hamer (yellow card) 64'; House (yellow card) 73' | Report | Matete 29'; Jones (yellow card) 36'; Murphy 38'; Dacres-Cogley (yellow card) 90' (yellow-red card) 90+2' | Stadium: LNER Stadium; Attendance: 10,240; Referee: Jacob Miles |

| 26 April 2025 45 | Peterborough United | 1–1 | Bolton Wanderers | Peterborough |
| 15:00 BST | Mothersille 20' (pen.), (yellow card) 20'; Odoh (yellow card) 24' de Havilland (yellow card) 72'; Kyprianou (yellow card) 85' | Report | Lolos (yellow card) 16'; Matete (yellow card) 18'; Thomason (yellow card) 24'; Forino-Joseph 33', (yellow card) 65'; Randall (yellow card) 68' | Stadium: Weston Homes Stadium; Attendance: 9,231; Referee: Ruebyn Ricardo |

| 3 May 2025 46 | Bolton Wanderers | 1–1 | Stevenage | Horwich |
| 15:00 BST | Dacres-Cogley 66' | Report | Young 76'; Piergianni (yellow card) 82' | Stadium: Toughsheet Community Stadium; Attendance: 20,613; Referee: Darren Drysdale |

=== FA Cup ===
On 14 October, the draw for the first round was made, with Bolton being drawn away to Walsall.

Win Draw Loss Fixtures

| 2 November 2024 First round | Walsall | 2–1 | Bolton Wanderers | Walsall |
| 15:00 BST | Williams (yellow card) 53'; Gordon 59'; Jellis 90+1'; Matt (yellow card) 90+8' | Report | Sheehan 55'; Schön (yellow card) 65'; Matete (yellow card) 90+8' | Stadium: Bescot Stadium; Attendance: 6,684; Referee: Ruebyn Ricardo |

=== EFL Cup ===
On 27 June, the draw for the first round was made, with Bolton being drawn at home against Mansfield Town. In the second round, Bolton were drawn away to Shrewsbury Town. In the third round, Bolton were again drawn away to Premier League side Arsenal.

Win Draw Loss Fixtures

| 13 August 2024 First round | Bolton Wanderers | 1–1 (5–4 p) | Mansfield Town | Horwich |
| 19:45 BST | Johnston (yellow card) 39'; McAtee (yellow card) 40'; Thomason 68' | Report | Macdonald (yellow card) 28'; Oshilaja (yellow card) 67'; Boateng (yellow card) 78'; Keillor-Dunn 83', (yellow card) 90+3' | Stadium: Toughsheet Community Stadium; Attendance: 4,131; Referee: Adam Herczeg |
| | Penalties |
| | Adeboyejo (penalty scored); Thomason (penalty missed); Collins (penalty scored); Williams (penalty missed); Charles (penalty scored); Matete (penalty scored); Dacres-Cogley (penalty scored) | | Bowery (penalty scored); Gregory (penalty scored); Hewitt (penalty scored); Boateng (penalty missed); Lewis (penalty missed); Macdonald (penalty scored); Swan (penalty missed) |

| 27 August 2024 Second round | Shrewsbury Town | 0–2 | Bolton Wanderers | Shrewsbury |
| 19:45 BST | Hoole (yellow card) 62'; Pierre (yellow card) 70' | Report | Osei-Tutu 52'; Charles 65' | Stadium: The Croud Meadow; Attendance: 3,220; Referee: Sunny Sukhvir Gill |

| 25 September 2024 Third round | Arsenal | 5–1 | Bolton Wanderers | Holloway |
| 19:45 BST | Rice 16'; Calafiori (yellow card) 34'; Nwaneri 37', 49'; Sterling 64'; Havertz 77' | Report | Collins 53' | Stadium: Emirates Stadium; Attendance: 59,056; Referee: Josh Smith |

=== EFL Trophy ===
In the group stage, Bolton were drawn into Northern Group D alongside Barrow, Fleetwood Town and Aston Villa U21. In the Round of 32, Bolton were drawn at home to Huddersfield Town. In the Round of 16, Bolton were drawn away to Lincoln City. In the Quarter-finals, Bolton were drawn away to Wrexham.

==== Group stage ====
| Pos | Div | Team | Pld | W | PW | PL | L | GF | GA | GD | Pts | Qualification |
|---|---|---|---|---|---|---|---|---|---|---|---|---|
| 1 | L1 | Bolton Wanderers | 3 | 2 | 0 | 1 | 0 | 6 | 4 | +2 | 7 | Advance to Round 2 |
| 2 | ACA | Aston Villa U21 | 3 | 1 | 1 | 0 | 1 | 4 | 6 | −2 | 5 | Advance to Round 2 |
| 3 | L2 | Fleetwood Town | 3 | 1 | 0 | 0 | 2 | 6 | 5 | +1 | 3 | |
| 4 | L2 | Barrow | 3 | 1 | 0 | 0 | 2 | 5 | 6 | −1 | 3 | |

Source: EFL

Win Draw Loss Fixtures

| 3 September 2024 Group game 1 | Barrow | 2–3 | Bolton Wanderers | Barrow-in-Furness |
| 19:45 BST | Foley 38'; Dallas 81' | Report | Schön (yellow card) 65'; McAtee 68'; Collins 73'; Dempsey (yellow card) 77', (goal) 79' | Stadium: Holker Street; Attendance: 2,006; Referee: Thomas Parsons |

| 8 October 2024 Group game 2 | Bolton Wanderers | 1–1 (1–4 p) | Aston Villa U21 | Bolton |
| 19:45 BST | Adeboyejo 79'; Johnston (yellow card) 83' | Report | Mulley 33'; Zych (yellow card) 40' (yellow card) PSO; Barnes (yellow card) 49'; Amundsen-Day (yellow card) 77' | Stadium: Toughsheet Community Stadium; Attendance: 1,767; Referee: Aaron Bannister |
| | Penalties |
| | Collins (penalty missed); Dempsey (penalty scored); Thomason (penalty missed) | | (penalty scored) Borland; (penalty scored) Amundsen-Day; (penalty scored) Brannigan; (penalty scored) Burrowes |
Note: Fixture was initially scheduled for 24 September, but was rearranged due to EFL Cup involvement.

| 12 November 2024 Group game 3 | Bolton Wanderers | 2–1 | Fleetwood Town | Bolton |
| 19:45 GMT | Collins 26', 90+1'; Forrester (yellow card) 75' | Report | Hughes (yellow card) 24'; Graydon 52'; Patterson (yellow card) 87' | Stadium: Toughsheet Community Stadium; Attendance: 1,607; Referee: Elliot Bell |

==== Knockout stage ====
| 10 December 2024 Round of 32 | Bolton Wanderers | 3–1 | Huddersfield Town | Bolton |
| 19:45 GMT | Lolos 40', (yellow card) 86'; Collins 83', 88' | Report | Pearson (yellow card) 48'; Koroma (yellow card) 50'; Kasumu (yellow card) 52'; Headley (yellow card) 86'; Dacres-Cogley 90' (o.g.); Iorpenda (yellow card) 90+5' | Stadium: Toughsheet Community Stadium; Attendance: 1,802; Referee: Scott Jackson |

| 14 January 2025 Round of 16 | Lincoln City | 0–1 | Bolton Wanderers | Lincoln |
| 19:00 GMT | Erhahon (yellow card) 82' | Report | Collins 21'; Dacres-Cogley (yellow card) 35'; Santos (yellow card) 51'; Matete (yellow card) 56'; Schön (yellow card) 90+2' | Stadium: LNER Stadium; Attendance: 2,252; Referee: Thomas Parsons |

| 11 February 2025 Quarter-Final | Wrexham | 1–0 | Bolton Wanderers | Wrexham |
| 19:30 GMT | Cannon (yellow card) 42', (goal) 70' | | Sheehan (yellow card) 30'; Dacres-Cogley (yellow card) 68'; Collins (yellow card) 78'; Johnston (yellow card) 90+2' | Stadium: STōK Cae Ras; Attendance: 7,591; Referee: Ross Joyce |

== Statistics ==
=== Appearances and goals ===
As of match played 3 May 2025

Players with no appearances are not included on the list

| No. | Pos | Nat | Player | Total | | League One | | FA Cup | | EFL Cup | | EFL Trophy | |
| No. | Pos | Nat | Player | Apps | Goals | Apps | Goals | Apps | Goals | Apps | Goals | Apps | Goals |
|---|---|---|---|---|---|---|---|---|---|---|---|---|---|
| 1 | GK | (England) ENG | Nathan Baxter | 29 | 0 | 26+0 | 0 | 0+0 | 0 | 0+0 | 0 | 3+0 | 0 |
| 2 | DF | (Australia) AUS | Gethin Jones | 27 | 0 | 16+7 | 0 | 0+0 | 0 | 0+0 | 0 | 4+0 | 0 |
| 3 | DF | (Republic of Ireland) IRL | Alex Murphy | 13 | 2 | 11+2 | 2 | 0+0 | 0 | 0+0 | 0 | 0+0 | 0 |
| 4 | MF | (England) ENG | George Thomason | 46 | 5 | 35+3 | 4 | 0+0 | 0 | 1+2 | 1 | 5+0 | 0 |
| 5 | DF | (Portugal) POR | Ricardo Santos | 32 | 1 | 25+0 | 1 | 0+0 | 0 | 3+0 | 0 | 4+0 | 0 |
| 6 | DF | (Scotland) SCO | George Johnston | 48 | 0 | 37+1 | 0 | 1+0 | 0 | 2+1 | 0 | 5+1 | 0 |
| 7 | MF | (Guinea-Bissau) GBS | Carlos Mendes Gomes | 12 | 0 | 2+9 | 0 | 0+0 | 0 | 0+0 | 0 | 0+1 | 0 |
| 8 | MF | (Wales) WAL | Josh Sheehan | 38 | 4 | 29+5 | 3 | 1+0 | 1 | 1+1 | 0 | 1+0 | 0 |
| 9 | FW | (Nigeria) NGR | Victor Adeboyejo | 35 | 4 | 12+15 | 3 | 0+1 | 0 | 1+1 | 0 | 4+1 | 1 |
| 12 | DF | (England) ENG | Josh Dacres-Cogley | 52 | 1 | 37+5 | 1 | 1+0 | 0 | 2+1 | 0 | 5+1 | 0 |
| 14 | DF | (England) ENG | Jordi Osei-Tutu | 38 | 2 | 15+17 | 1 | 0+0 | 0 | 2+0 | 1 | 3+1 | 0 |
| 15 | DF | (England) ENG | Will Forrester | 27 | 0 | 18+5 | 0 | 1+0 | 0 | 0+0 | 0 | 3+0 | 0 |
| 16 | MF | (England) ENG | Aaron Morley | 20 | 4 | 18+1 | 4 | 0+0 | 0 | 1+0 | 0 | 0+0 | 0 |
| 17 | MF | (Greece) GRE | Klaidi Lolos | 30 | 3 | 8+16 | 2 | 1+0 | 0 | 0+0 | 0 | 5+0 | 1 |
| 18 | DF | (Northern Ireland) NIR | Eoin Toal | 22 | 2 | 18+1 | 2 | 0+0 | 0 | 1+1 | 0 | 1+0 | 0 |
| 19 | FW | (Wales) WAL | Aaron Collins | 55 | 19 | 36+9 | 12 | 0+1 | 0 | 1+2 | 1 | 4+2 | 6 |
| 20 | GK | (Northern Ireland) NIR | Luke Southwood | 26 | 0 | 20+0 | 0 | 1+0 | 0 | 3+0 | 0 | 2+0 | 0 |
| 21 | DF | (Saint Lucia) LCA | Chris Forino-Joseph | 19 | 2 | 12+4 | 2 | 0+0 | 0 | 3+0 | 0 | 0+0 | 0 |
| 22 | MF | (England) ENG | Kyle Dempsey | 19 | 4 | 8+7 | 3 | 0+0 | 0 | 2+0 | 0 | 1+1 | 1 |
| 23 | MF | (Hungary) HUN | Szabolcs Schön | 44 | 1 | 34+5 | 1 | 1+0 | 0 | 0+1 | 0 | 1+2 | 0 |
| 28 | MF | (England) ENG | Jay Matete | 45 | 3 | 18+17 | 3 | 1+0 | 0 | 2+1 | 0 | 6+0 | 0 |
| 29 | FW | (England) ENG | Kion Etete | 5 | 0 | 0+5 | 0 | 0+0 | 0 | 0+0 | 0 | 0+0 | 0 |
| 31 | MF | (England) ENG | Joel Randall | 19 | 1 | 10+9 | 1 | 0+0 | 0 | 0+0 | 0 | 0+0 | 0 |
| 32 | FW | (Scotland) SCO | Ben Andreucci | 1 | 0 | 0+0 | 0 | 0+0 | 0 | 0+0 | 0 | 0+1 | 0 |
| 40 | GK | (England) ENG | Luke Hutchinson | 1 | 0 | 0+0 | 0 | 0+0 | 0 | 0+0 | 0 | 1+0 | 0 |
| 41 | DF | (England) ENG | Luke Matheson | 2 | 0 | 0+0 | 0 | 0+0 | 0 | 0+0 | 0 | 1+1 | 0 |
| 45 | FW | (England) ENG | John McAtee | 55 | 12 | 31+14 | 11 | 0+1 | 0 | 2+1 | 0 | 2+4 | 1 |
| 48 | MF | (Egypt) EGY | Sonny Sharples-Ahmed | 5 | 0 | 1+2 | 0 | 0+0 | 0 | 0+1 | 0 | 1+0 | 0 |
| 52 | DF | (Northern Ireland) NIR | Sam Inwood | 3 | 0 | 2+0 | 0 | 0+0 | 0 | 0+0 | 0 | 0+1 | 0 |
| 54 | MF | (England) ENG | Daeshon Lawrence | 2 | 0 | 0+2 | 0 | 0+0 | 0 | 0+0 | 0 | 0+0 | 0 |
| 55 | MF | (England) ENG | Conor Lewis | 1 | 0 | 0+0 | 0 | 0+0 | 0 | 0+0 | 0 | 0+1 | 0 |
| 56 | FW | (England) ENG | David Abimbola | 4 | 0 | 1+3 | 0 | 0+0 | 0 | 0+0 | 0 | 0+0 | 0 |
| 57 | MF | (England) ENG | Harrison Rice | 1 | 0 | 0+1 | 0 | 0+0 | 0 | 0+0 | 0 | 0+0 | 0 |
Players who featured but departed the club permanently during the season:
| 3 | DF | (Australia) AUS | Jack Iredale | 1 | 0 | 1+0 | 0 | 0+0 | 0 | 0+0 | 0 | 0+0 | 0 |
| 10 | FW | (Northern Ireland) NIR | Dion Charles | 29 | 8 | 15+9 | 7 | 1+0 | 0 | 1+2 | 1 | 1+0 | 0 |
| 27 | MF | (England) ENG | Randell Williams | 22 | 1 | 7+9 | 1 | 1+0 | 0 | 2+0 | 0 | 3+0 | 0 |
| 37 | MF | (Canada) CAN | Scott Arfield | 16 | 0 | 3+9 | 0 | 1+0 | 0 | 3+0 | 0 | 0+0 | 0 |

=== Goals record ===
As of match played 3 May 2025

| Rank | No. | Nat. | Po. | Name | League One | FA Cup | EFL Cup | EFL Trophy | Total |
|---|---|---|---|---|---|---|---|---|---|
| 1 | 19 | (Wales) | CF | Aaron Collins | 12 | 0 | 1 | 6 | 19 |
| 2 | 45 | (England) | CF | John McAtee | 11 | 0 | 0 | 1 | 12 |
| 3 | 10 | (Northern Ireland) | CF | Dion Charles | 7 | 0 | 1 | 0 | 8 |
| 4 | 4 | (England) | CM | George Thomason | 4 | 0 | 1 | 0 | 5 |
| 5= | 8 | (Wales) | CM | Josh Sheehan | 3 | 1 | 0 | 0 | 4 |
| 5= | 9 | (Nigeria) | CF | Victor Adeboyejo | 3 | 0 | 0 | 1 | 4 |
| 5= | 16 | (England) | CM | Aaron Morley | 4 | 0 | 0 | 0 | 4 |
| 5= | 22 | (England) | CM | Kyle Dempsey | 3 | 0 | 0 | 1 | 4 |
| 9= | 17 | (Greece) | AM | Klaidi Lolos | 2 | 0 | 0 | 1 | 3 |
| 9= | 28 | (England) | DM | Jay Matete | 3 | 0 | 0 | 0 | 3 |
| 11= | 3 | (Republic of Ireland) | LB | Alex Murphy | 2 | 0 | 0 | 0 | 2 |
| 11= | 14 | (England) | RB | Jordi Osei-Tutu | 1 | 0 | 1 | 0 | 2 |
| 11= | 18 | (Northern Ireland) | CB | Eoin Toal | 2 | 0 | 0 | 0 | 2 |
| 11= | 21 | (Saint Lucia) | CB | Chris Forino-Joseph | 2 | 0 | 0 | 0 | 2 |
| 15= | 5 | (Portugal) | CB | Ricardo Santos | 1 | 0 | 0 | 0 | 1 |
| 15= | 12 | (England) | RB | Josh Dacres-Cogley | 1 | 0 | 0 | 0 | 1 |
| 15= | 23 | (Hungary) | LW | Szabolcs Schön | 1 | 0 | 0 | 0 | 1 |
| 15= | 27 | (England) | LB | Randell Williams | 1 | 0 | 0 | 0 | 1 |
| 15= | 31 | (England) | AM | Joel Randall | 1 | 0 | 0 | 0 | 1 |
| Own Goals | | | | | 3 | 0 | 0 | 0 | 3 |
| Total | | | | | 67 | 1 | 4 | 10 | 82 |

=== Disciplinary record ===
As of match played 3 May 2025

| Rank | No. | Nat. | Po. | Name | League One | | | FA Cup | | | EFL Cup | | | EFL Trophy | | | Total | | |
| Rank | No. | Nat. | Po. | Name | Yellow card | (yellow card) (yellow-red card) | Red card | Yellow card | (yellow card) (yellow-red card) | Red card | Yellow card | (yellow card) (yellow-red card) | Red card | Yellow card | (yellow card) (yellow-red card) | Red card | Yellow card | (yellow card) (yellow-red card) | Red card |
|---|---|---|---|---|---|---|---|---|---|---|---|---|---|---|---|---|---|---|---|
| 1= | 23 | (Hungary) | LW | Szabolcs Schön | 9 | 0 | 0 | 1 | 0 | 0 | 0 | 0 | 0 | 2 | 0 | 0 | 12 | 0 | 0 |
| 1= | 28 | (England) | CM | Jay Matete | 10 | 0 | 0 | 1 | 0 | 0 | 0 | 0 | 0 | 1 | 0 | 0 | 12 | 0 | 0 |
| 3= | 4 | (England) | CM | George Thomason | 11 | 0 | 0 | 0 | 0 | 0 | 0 | 0 | 0 | 0 | 0 | 0 | 11 | 0 | 0 |
| 3= | 6 | (Scotland) | CB | George Johnston | 8 | 0 | 0 | 0 | 0 | 0 | 1 | 0 | 0 | 2 | 0 | 0 | 11 | 0 | 0 |
| 5 | 12 | (England) | RB | Josh Dacres-Cogley | 5 | 1 | 0 | 0 | 0 | 0 | 0 | 0 | 0 | 2 | 0 | 0 | 7 | 1 | 0 |
| 6 | 8 | (Wales) | CM | Josh Sheehan | 8 | 0 | 0 | 0 | 0 | 0 | 0 | 0 | 0 | 1 | 0 | 0 | 9 | 0 | 0 |
| 7 | 5 | (Portugal) | CB | Ricardo Santos | 7 | 0 | 0 | 0 | 0 | 0 | 0 | 0 | 0 | 1 | 0 | 0 | 8 | 0 | 0 |
| 8= | 14 | (England) | RB | Jordi Osei-Tutu | 7 | 0 | 0 | 0 | 0 | 0 | 0 | 0 | 0 | 0 | 0 | 0 | 7 | 0 | 0 |
| 8= | 45 | (England) | CF | John McAtee | 6 | 0 | 0 | 0 | 0 | 0 | 1 | 0 | 0 | 0 | 0 | 0 | 7 | 0 | 0 |
| 10= | 17 | (Greece) | AM | Klaidi Lolos | 5 | 0 | 0 | 0 | 0 | 0 | 0 | 0 | 0 | 1 | 0 | 0 | 6 | 0 | 0 |
| 10= | 19 | (Wales) | CF | Aaron Collins | 5 | 0 | 0 | 0 | 0 | 0 | 0 | 0 | 0 | 1 | 0 | 0 | 6 | 0 | 0 |
| 10= | 27 | (England) | LB | Randell Williams | 6 | 0 | 0 | 0 | 0 | 0 | 0 | 0 | 0 | 0 | 0 | 0 | 6 | 0 | 0 |
| 13 | 16 | (England) | CM | Aaron Morley | 2 | 1 | 0 | 0 | 0 | 0 | 0 | 0 | 0 | 0 | 0 | 0 | 2 | 1 | 0 |
| 14= | 1 | (England) | GK | Nathan Baxter | 4 | 0 | 0 | 0 | 0 | 0 | 0 | 0 | 0 | 0 | 0 | 0 | 4 | 0 | 0 |
| 14= | 15 | (England) | CB | Will Forrester | 3 | 0 | 0 | 0 | 0 | 0 | 0 | 0 | 0 | 1 | 0 | 0 | 4 | 0 | 0 |
| 16= | 2 | (Australia) | CB | Gethin Jones | 3 | 0 | 0 | 0 | 0 | 0 | 0 | 0 | 0 | 0 | 0 | 0 | 3 | 0 | 0 |
| 16= | 21 | (Saint Lucia) | CB | Chris Forino-Joseph | 3 | 0 | 0 | 0 | 0 | 0 | 0 | 0 | 0 | 0 | 0 | 0 | 3 | 0 | 0 |
| 16= | 22 | (England) | CM | Kyle Dempsey | 2 | 0 | 0 | 0 | 0 | 0 | 0 | 0 | 0 | 1 | 0 | 0 | 3 | 0 | 0 |
| 19= | 9 | (Nigeria) | CF | Victor Adeboyejo | 2 | 0 | 0 | 0 | 0 | 0 | 0 | 0 | 0 | 0 | 0 | 0 | 2 | 0 | 0 |
| 19= | 18 | (Northern Ireland) | CB | Eoin Toal | 2 | 0 | 0 | 0 | 0 | 0 | 0 | 0 | 0 | 0 | 0 | 0 | 2 | 0 | 0 |
| 19= | 20 | (Northern Ireland) | GK | Luke Southwood | 2 | 0 | 0 | 0 | 0 | 0 | 0 | 0 | 0 | 0 | 0 | 0 | 2 | 0 | 0 |
| 22= | 3 | (Republic of Ireland) | LB | Alex Murphy | 1 | 0 | 0 | 0 | 0 | 0 | 0 | 0 | 0 | 0 | 0 | 0 | 1 | 0 | 0 |
| 22= | 10 | (Northern Ireland) | CF | Dion Charles | 1 | 0 | 0 | 0 | 0 | 0 | 0 | 0 | 0 | 0 | 0 | 0 | 1 | 0 | 0 |
| 22= | 31 | (England) | AM | Joel Randall | 1 | 0 | 0 | 0 | 0 | 0 | 0 | 0 | 0 | 0 | 0 | 0 | 1 | 0 | 0 |
| 22= | 37 | (Canada) | AM | Scott Arfield | 1 | 0 | 0 | 0 | 0 | 0 | 0 | 0 | 0 | 0 | 0 | 0 | 1 | 0 | 0 |
| Total | | | | | 114 | 2 | 0 | 2 | 0 | 0 | 2 | 0 | 0 | 13 | 0 | 0 | 131 | 2 | 0 |
