= 2024–25 Northampton Town F.C. season =

128th season in existence of Northampton Town FC

Northampton Town F.C.
2024–25 season
- Chairman: Kelvin Thomas
- Manager: Jon Brady (until 5 December); Ian Sampson (interim from 5 December); Kevin Nolan (from 23 December)
- Stadium: Sixfields Stadium
- League One: 19th
- FA Cup: First round
- EFL Cup: First round
- EFL Trophy: Round of 32
- Top goalscorer: League: Cameron McGeehan (10); All: Cameron McGeehan (10)
- Highest home attendance: 7,947 vs Birmingham City
- Lowest home attendance: 778 vs Burton Albion
- Average home league attendance: 6,638
Home colours	Away colours	Third colours

The 2024–25 season was Northampton Town's 128th season in their history and their second successive season in League One. Alongside competing in League One, the club also participated in the FA Cup, EFL Cup and EFL Trophy. The season covered the period from 1 July 2024 to 30 June 2025.

== Players ==
As of 3 May 2025

No.	Name	Position	Nat.	Place of birth	Date of birth (age)	Apps	Goals	Previous club	Date signed	Fee
Goalkeepers
1	Lee Burge	GK	(England)	Hereford	9 January 1993 (aged 32)	89	0	Sunderland	22 June 2022	Free
13	Nik Tzanev	GK	(New Zealand)	Wellington	23 December 1996 (aged 28)	23	0	AFC Wimbledon	3 July 2024	Free
36	James Dadge	GK	(England)	Northampton	18 October 2004 (aged 20)	1	0	Academy	1 July 2023	N/A
Defenders
2	Tyler Magloire	CB	(England)	Bradford	21 December 1998 (aged 26)	54	3	Blackburn Rovers	28 July 2022	Undisclosed
3	Aaron McGowan (vc)	RB	(England)	Liverpool	24 July 1996 (aged 28)	131	3	Kilmarnock	12 July 2021	Undisclosed
5	Jon Guthrie (c)	CB	(England)	Devizes	29 July 1992 (aged 32)	156	15	Livingston	24 June 2021	Free
6	Jordan Willis	CB	(England)	Coventry	24 August 1994 (aged 30)	44	0	Wycombe Wanderers	7 October 2023	Free
12	Nesta Guinness-Walker	LB	(England)	London	14 September 1999 (aged 25)	29	1	Reading	27 September 2024	Free
14	Ali Koiki	LB	(England)	Kensington	22 August 1999 (aged 25)	93	2	Bristol Rovers	23 July 2021	Free
21	Luke Mbete	CB	(England)	Westminster	18 September 2003 (aged 21)	14	0	Manchester City	12 August 2024	Loan
22	Akin Odimayo	FB	(England)	Camden	28 November 1999 (aged 25)	98	0	Swindon Town	2 July 2022	Compensation
26	Jack Baldwin	CB	(England)	Barking	30 June 1993 (aged 31)	24	1	Ross County	9 July 2024	Undisclosed
28	Timothy Eyoma	CB	(England)	Hackney	29 January 2000 (aged 25)	27	1	Lincoln City	1 November 2024	Free
33	Patrick Brough	LB	(England)	Carlisle	20 February 1996 (aged 29)	45	2	Barrow	15 June 2023	Free
35	Max Dyche	CB	(England)	Northampton	22 February 2003 (aged 22)	52	1	Academy	12 December 2020	N/A
Midfielders
4	Jack Sowerby	CM	(England)	Preston	23 March 1995 (aged 30)	153	2	Fleetwood Town	18 September 2020	Undisclosed
8	Ben Perry	AM	(England)	Nottingham	11 October 2004 (aged 20)	17	0	Nottingham Forest	3 February 2025	Loan
10	Mitch Pinnock	W	(England)	Gravesend	12 December 1994 (aged 30)	200	25	Kilmarnock	8 June 2021	Free
16	Terry Taylor	CM	(Wales)	Irvine (SCO)	29 June 2001 (aged 23)	19	1	Charlton Athletic	22 January 2025	Loan
17	Liam McCarron	LM	(Scotland)	Preston (ENG)	7 March 2001 (aged 24)	21	2	Stoke City	1 August 2024	Undisclosed
18	Cameron McGeehan	CM	(Northern Ireland)	Kingston (ENG)	6 April 1995 (aged 30)	43	10	Colchester United	5 July 2024	Free
23	Will Hondermarck	CM	(Republic of the Congo)	Orléans (FRA)	21 November 2000 (aged 24)	88	2	Barnsley	26 January 2023	Undisclosed
24	Tariqe Fosu	W	(Ghana)	Wandsworth (ENG)	5 November 1995 (aged 29)	36	4	Brentford	9 August 2024	Free
29	Liam Shaw	CM	(England)	Sheffield	12 March 2001 (aged 24)	8	2	Fleetwood Town	3 January 2025	Undisclosed
30	Samy Chouchane	CM	(Tunisia)	Neuilly-sur-Seine (FRA)	5 September 2003 (aged 21)	27	0	Brighton & Hove Albion	19 August 2024	Loan
Forwards
7	Sam Hoskins	FW	(England)	Dorchester	4 February 1993 (aged 32)	417	97	Yeovil Town	1 August 2015	Free
9	Tom Eaves	CF	(England)	Liverpool	14 January 1992 (aged 33)	24	5	Rotherham United	12 July 2024	Free
11	James Wilson	CF	(England)	Biddulph	1 December 1995 (aged 29)	11	0	Port Vale	2 July 2024	Free
15	Dara Costelloe	FW	(Republic of Ireland)	Limerick	11 December 2002 (aged 22)	15	6	Burnley	3 February 2025	Loan
19	Tyler Roberts	FW	(Wales)	Gloucester (ENG)	12 January 1999 (aged 26)	29	1	Birmingham City	30 August 2024	Loan
39	Callum Morton	CF	(England)	Torquay	19 January 2000 (aged 25)	20	9	Salford City	4 July 2024	Loan

== Pre-season and friendlies ==
On 8 May, the club announced a four-day pre-season training camp in Alicante. At the end of May, Town confirmed their first friendly fixture, versus Cheltenham Town. On June 4, a second friendly fixture was confirmed, against Brackley Town. Ten days later, a third friendly was added versus Norwich City. A fourth friendly fixture was confirmed, away against King's Lynn Town. On 16 July, the club also confirmed a fixture for the pre-season training camp in Spain, versus La Unión Atlético.

Win Draw Loss Fixtures

13 July 2024 Friendly	Northampton Town	0–3	Norwich City	Northampton
15:00 BST		Report	J.Rowe 4', 12'; K.Aboh 89'	Stadium: Sixfields; Attendance: 2,626 (774); Referee: Andy Woolmer

20 July 2024 Practice Match	Northampton Town	2–0	Peterborough Sports	Northampton
12:00 BST	3' (o.g.); S.Hoskins 64'	Report		Stadium: Sixfields; Attendance: Behind Closed Doors

27 July 2024 Friendly	Brackley Town	1–2	Northampton Town	Brackley
14:00 BST	S.Pollock 56'	Report	J.Guthrie 27'; 64' (o.g.)	Stadium: St. James Park; Referee: Joe Woolmer

30 July 2024 Friendly	King's Lynn Town	2–2	Northampton Town	King's Lynn
19:45 BST	J.Margetts 71'; B.Cybulski 79'	Report	A.Trialist 15'; J.Wilson 31'	Stadium: The Walks

3 August 2024 Friendly	Cheltenham Town	2–0	Northampton Town	Cheltenham
15:00 BST	R.Bowman 20', 22'	Report		Stadium: Whaddon Road; Referee: Scott Tallis

== Competitions ==
=== League One ===
==== League table ====
Pos	Team	Pld	W	D	L	GF	GA	GD	Pts	Promotion, qualification or relegation
17	Mansfield Town	46	15	9	22	60	73	−13	54	
18	Peterborough United	46	13	12	21	68	81	−13	51	
19	Northampton Town	46	12	15	19	48	66	−18	51	
20	Burton Albion	46	11	14	21	49	66	−17	47	
21	Crawley Town (R)	46	12	10	24	57	83	−26	46	Relegation to EFL League Two

Source: EFL Official Website
Rules for classification: 1) Points; 2) Goal difference; 3) Number of goals scored; 4) Head-to-head results; 5) Wins; 6) Away goals; 7) Penalty points (sec 9.5); 8) 12-point sending off offences
(R) Relegated

==== Results summary ====
Overall								Home						Away					
Pld	W	D	L	GF	GA	GD	Pts	W	D	L	GF	GA	GD	W	D	L	GF	GA	GD
46	12	15	19	48	66	−18	51	7	7	9	24	31	−7	5	8	10	24	35	−11

Last updated: 3 May 2025.
Source: Soccerway

==== League position by match ====
Round	1	2	3	4	6	7	8	9	10	12	13	14	5^{1}	15	16	17	11^{2}	18	19	20	21	22	23	24	25	27	28	29	30	31	32	33	26^{3}	34	35	36	37	38	39	40	41	42	43	44	45	46
Ground	A	H	A	H	H	A	H	H	A	H	A	H	A	A	A	H	A	A	H	A	H	A	A	H	A	H	A	A	H	A	H	H	H	A	H	A	H	H	A	H	A	H	A	H	A	H
Result	L	W	D	D	L	W	L	L	L	W	D	W	L	D	D	D	L	L	W	L	L	L	D	D	W	L	D	L	W	W	L	W	L	D	D	W	D	L	D	L	W	D	L	W	L	D
Position	19	14	10	13	18	12	17	19	20	19	19	17	18	17	16	16	18	21	17	19	20	20	19	19	18	20	20	20	20	17	19	17	17	18	18	17	19	19	19	19	18	19	19	18	18	19

Updated to match(es) played on 3 May 2025. Source:
A = Away; H = Home; W = Win; D = Draw; L = Loss; P = Postponed
Notes:
- ^{1} Matchday 5 (vs Lincoln City) was postponed due to the international call-ups.
- ^{2} Matchday 11 (vs Wigan Athletic) was postponed due to the international call-ups.
- ^{3} Matchday 26 (vs Barnsley) was postponed due to a frozen pitch.

==== Matches ====
Win Draw Loss Fixtures

On 26 June, the League One fixtures were announced.

10 August 2024 1	Bristol Rovers	1–0	Northampton Town	Bristol
17:30 BST	J.Griffiths (yellow card) 24'; B.Bilongo 90+2'	Report	S.Hoskins (yellow card) 90+1'; B.Fox (yellow card) 90+3'	Stadium: Memorial Stadium; Attendance: 8,529 (586); Referee: Alex Chilowicz

17 August 2024 2	Northampton Town	2–1	Exeter City	Northampton
15:00 BST	A.McGowan (yellow card) 55'; C.Morton 65'; C.McGeehan 77'; L.Mbete (yellow card) 87'	Report	T.Crama 8'; E.Francis (yellow card) 35'; R.Cole (yellow card) 43'	Stadium: Sixfields; Attendance: 5,981 (490); Referee: Carl Brook

24 August 2024 3	Barnsley	2–2	Northampton Town	Barnsley
15:00 BST	M.Watters 26'; A.Phillips 46'; J.Earl (yellow card) 62'; K.Lofthouse (yellow card) 90+5'	Report	L.McCarron 73'; J.Baldwin 78'	Stadium: Oakwell; Attendance: 11,248 (528); Referee: Darren Drysdale

31 August 2024 4	Northampton Town	0–0	Burton Albion	Northampton
15:00 BST	W.Hondermarck (yellow card) 26'; C.McGeehan (yellow card) 34'; S.Chouchane (yellow card) 54'	Report	T.Kalinauskas (yellow card) 33'; E.Watt (yellow card) 34'; D.Orsi (yellow card) 43'	Stadium: Sixfields; Attendance: 5,909 (410); Referee: Ben Atkinson

14 September 2024 6	Northampton Town	1–2	Wycombe Wanderers	Northampton
12:30 BST	S.Hoskins 4' (pen.); P.Brough (yellow card) 43'	Report	J.Grimmer (yellow card) 4'; D.Udoh 11'; R.Kone 52'; J.Scowen (yellow card) 61'; F.Ravizzoli (yellow card) 86'	Stadium: Sixfields; Attendance: 5,995 (624); Referee: Adam Herczeg
Note: Fixture was initially scheduled for a 15:00 kick-off, but was moved for live Sky Sports broadcast.

21 September 2024 7	Huddersfield Town	1–3	Northampton Town	Huddersfield
15:00 BST	J.Headley (yellow card) 33'; J.Koroma 80' (penalty missed) 84'; B.Spencer (yellow card) 90+4'	Report	M.Helik 18' (o.g.); T.Fosu (yellow card) 20' (goal) 58'; C.McGeehan 25'; M.Pinnock (yellow card) 43'; A.Odimayo (yellow card) 79' (yellow-red card) 83'; L.Mbete (yellow card) 89'; J.Baldwin (yellow card) 90+3'	Stadium: Kirklees Stadium; Attendance: 18,417 (775); Referee: Sunny Singh Gill

28 September 2024 8	Northampton Town	0–2	Mansfield Town	Northampton
15:00 BST	T.Fosu (penalty missed) 38	Report	W.Evans 47' (yellow card) 51'; B.Cargill (yellow card) 58'; H.Boateng (yellow card) 67'; A.Lewis 89'	Stadium: Sixfields; Attendance: 7,223 (1,465); Referee: Ben Speedie

1 October 2024 9	Northampton Town	2–4	Bolton Wanderers	Northampton
19:45 BST	C.McGeehan (yellow card) 10'; S.Chouchane (yellow card) 37'; T.Roberts (yellow card) 67'; M.Pinnock (yellow card) 87'; T.Eaves 90+1'; J.Guthrie 90+3'	Report	J.McAtee 6'; G.Thomason (yellow card) 17' (goal) 23'; S.Schön (yellow card) 33'; E.Toal 60'; D.Charles 83'; J.Matete (yellow card) 90+2'; R.Williams (yellow card) 90+5'	Stadium: Sixfields; Attendance: 5,730 (633); Referee: Matthew Corlett

5 October 2024 10	Wrexham	4–1	Northampton Town	Wrexham, Wales
15:00 BST	J.McClean 8', 67' (yellow card) 29'; J.Marriott 38'; E.Lee 56'	Report	C.McGeehan 27'; J.Sowerby (yellow card) 31'; S.Hoskins (yellow card) 75'	Stadium: Racecourse Ground; Attendance: 13,324 (1,262); Referee: Geoff Eltringham

19 October 2024 12	Northampton Town	1–0	Leyton Orient	Northampton
15:00 BST	C.McGeehan 48'; J.Baldwin (yellow card) 55'; M.Pinnock (yellow card) 84'; J.Guthrie (yellow card) 90+3'	Report	E.Galbraith (yellow card) 10'; D.Agyei (yellow card) 35'; T.James (yellow card) 56'	Stadium: Sixfields; Attendance: 7,015 (841); Referee: Oliver Mackey

22 October 2024 13	Stockport County	1–1	Northampton Town	Stockport
19:45 BST	L.Barry 87' (pen.); L.Bate (yellow card) 90'	Report	A.Odimayo (yellow card) 54'; B.Fox (yellow card) 56'; S.Chouchane (yellow card) 64'; C.McGeehan (yellow card) 86'; T.Magloire 90+3'	Stadium: Edgeley Park; Attendance: 8,585 (304); Referee: Jacob Miles

26 October 2024 14	Northampton Town	3–0	Crawley Town	Northampton
15:00 BST	T.Fosu 16'; J.Williams 30' (o.g.); M.Pinnock 55'; B.Fox (yellow card) 84'	Report	R.Darcy (yellow card) 75'; J.Williams (yellow card) 84'	Stadium: Sixfields; Attendance: 6,445 (320); Referee: Thomas Kirk

29 October 2024 5	Lincoln City	2–1	Northampton Town	Lincoln
19:45 GMT	T.Hamer 18'; B.House (yellow card) 43'; E.Ring 88'; F.Draper (yellow card) 89'; G.Wickens (yellow card) 90+4'	Report	T.Fosu 2'; J.Baldwin (yellow card) 17'; T.Roberts (yellow card) 35' (yellow-red card) 75'; C.McGeehan (yellow card) 62'; J.Guthrie (yellow card) 90+3'; N.Guinness-Walker (yellow card) 90+4'	Stadium: Sincil Bank; Attendance: 8,219 (463); Referee: Ollie Yates
Note: Fixture was previous postponed due to international call-ups.

9 November 2024 15	Birmingham City	1–1	Northampton Town	Birmingham
15:00 GMT	J.Stansfield 58'; R.Allsop (yellow card) 90+2'	Report	J.Guthrie (yellow card) 41'; C.McGeehan (yellow card) 60'; M.Pinnock (yellow card) 90+1' (goal) 90+7'	Stadium: St Andrew's; Attendance: 27,085 (2,205); Referee: Carl Brook

16 November 2024 16	Blackpool	0–0	Northampton Town	Blackpool
15:00 GMT		Report	S.Hoskins (yellow card) 58'	Stadium: Bloomfield Road; Attendance: 8,873; Referee: Alex Chilowicz

23 November 2024 17	Northampton Town	0–0	Cambridge United	Northampton
15:00 GMT		Report	S.Lavery (yellow card) 75'	Stadium: Sixfields; Attendance: 6,654 (919); Referee: Alan Young

26 November 2024 11	Wigan Athletic	2–1	Northampton Town	Wigan
19:45 GMT	T.Aasgaard 11'; J.Smith 18'; M.Smith (yellow card) 79'	Report	J.Guthrie (yellow card) 48'; T.Eaves 56'	Stadium: Brick Community Stadium; Attendance: 7,754 (154); Referee: Aaron Bannister
Note: Fixture was previous postponed due to international call-ups.

3 December 2024 18	Stevenage	2–0	Northampton Town	Stevenage
19:45 GMT	C.Piergianni (yellow card) 2'; H.White (yellow card) 45+3'; N.Thompson (yellow card) 52'; D.Kemp 89'; J.Reid 90+3'	Report	T.Eaves (yellow card) 2' (yellow-red card) 28'; A.Odimayo (yellow card) 16'; C.McGeehan (yellow card) 51'	Stadium: Broadhall Way; Attendance: 2,767; Referee: Scott Jackson

9 December 2024 19	Northampton Town	2–1	Peterborough United	Northampton
20:00 GMT	C.McGeehan 28', 84'	Report	M.Mothersille 39'	Stadium: Sixfields; Attendance: 7,098 (1,465); Referee: Simon Mather
Note: Fixture was initially scheduled for 7 December, but was moved for live Sky Sports broadcast.

14 December 2024 20	Rotherham United	3–0	Northampton Town	Rotherham
15:00 GMT	J.Clarke-Harris 3', 34'; A.Green 49'; J.Powell (yellow card) 54'	Report	S.Hoskins (yellow card) 44'; M.Waghorn (yellow card) 72'	Stadium: New York Stadium; Attendance: 8,745 (659); Referee: Elliot Bell

21 December 2024 21	Northampton Town	0–5	Charlton Athletic	Northampton
15:00 GMT	C.McGeehan (yellow card) 36'; T.Roberts (yellow card) 73'	Report	G.Docherty 9', 68' (yellow card) 41'; T.Campbell 12'; M.Leaburn 36'; A.Mitchell (yellow card) 50'; A.Maynard-Brewer (yellow card) 60'; D.Hylton 90+1'	Stadium: Sixfields; Attendance: 7,015 (1,186); Referee: Ben Toner

26 December 2024 22	Reading	4–1	Northampton Town	Reading
15:00 GMT	H.Knibbs 5'; S.Smith 28'; C.Savage 75'; M.Camará 87'	Report	T.Eaves (yellow card) 45' (goal) 81'; C.McGeehan (yellow card) 90+3'	Stadium: Madejski Stadium; Attendance: 12,283 (508); Referee: Scott Simpson

29 December 2024 23	Shrewsbury Town	1–1	Northampton Town	Shrewsbury
15:00 GMT	T.Perry (yellow card) 40'; A.Pierre 60' (yellow card) 90+1'; J.Kayode (yellow card) 86'	Report	T.Eyoma (yellow card) 4'; C.McGeehan 63'	Stadium: New Meadow; Attendance: 6,894 (688); Referee: Seb Stockbridge

1 January 2025 24	Northampton Town	0–0	Stevenage	Northampton
15:00 GMT	W.Hondermarck (yellow card) 14'; N.Dobson (yellow card) 88'	Report		Stadium: Sixfields; Attendance: 6,294 (535); Referee: Darren Drysdale

4 January 2025 25	Burton Albion	0–1	Northampton Town	Burton upon Trent
12:30 GMT	C.Webster (yellow card) 17'	Report	S.Hoskins (yellow card) 84' (goal) 86'	Stadium: Pirelli Stadium; Attendance: 2,837; Referee: Ross Joyce
Note: Fixture was initially scheduled for a 15:00 kick-off, but was moved for live Sky Sports broadcast.

18 January 2025 27	Northampton Town	0–1	Lincoln City	Northampton
14:00 GMT	T.Eyoma (yellow card) 59'; T.Fosu (yellow card) 64'	Report	T.Darikwa 38'; B.House (yellow card) 70'	Stadium: Sixfields; Attendance: 6,094 (547); Referee: Craig Hicks

25 January 2025 28	Wycombe Wanderers	0–0	Northampton Town	High Wycombe
15:00 GMT		Report	A.McGowan (yellow card) 15'; T.Taylor (yellow card) 45'	Stadium: Adams Park; Attendance: 5,446 (587); Referee: David Rock

28 January 2024 29	Bolton Wanderers	3–1	Northampton Town	Horwich
19:45 GMT	G.Thomason 3'; J.Sheehan (yellow card) 41'; L.Shaw 44' (o.g.); A.Collins 83'	Report	L.Shaw 8' (yellow card) 36'; T.Taylor (yellow card) 31'	Stadium: Toughsheet Community Stadium; Attendance: 18,956; Referee: Sunny Singh Gill

1 February 2025 30	Northampton Town	3–2	Huddersfield Town	Northampton
15:00 GMT	S.Hoskins 32'; T.Eaves 40' (yellow card) 87'; L.Shaw 51'	Report	D.Charles (yellow card) 50'; M.Pearson (yellow card) 55'; H.Kane 70'; J.Hogg 82'	Stadium: Sixfields; Attendance: 6,933 (1,398); Referee: Ben Speedie

7 February 2025 31	Mansfield Town	0–1	Northampton Town	Mansfield
19:45 GMT	A.Lewis (yellow card) 28'; J.Rhodes (yellow card) 49'; H.Boateng (yellow card) 85'	Report	S.Hoskins (penalty missed) 20; C.McGeehan 55'; L.Shaw (yellow card) 81'; B.Perry (yellow card) 90+2'	Stadium: Field Mill; Attendance: 7,320 (543); Referee: Edward Duckworth
Note: Fixture was initially scheduled for 8 February, but was moved for live Sky Sports broadcasting.

15 February 2025 32	Northampton Town	0–2	Wrexham	Northampton
12:30 GMT	B.Perry (yellow card) 45'; C.McGeehan (yellow card) 86'	Report	S.Smith 19'; O.Rathbone 22'; M.Cleworth (yellow card) 86'	Stadium: Sixfields; Attendance: 7,685 (1,404); Referee: Tom Reeves
Note: Fixture was initially scheduled for a 15:00 kick-off, but was moved for live Sky Sports broadcasting.

22 February 2025 33	Northampton Town	2–1	Bristol Rovers	Northampton
15:00 GMT	D.Costelloe 61'; N.Guinness-Walker 78'; C.McGeehan (yellow card) 80'; M.Pinnock (yellow card) 90+4'	Report	S.Sinclair 46'; C.Taylor (yellow card) 60'; J.Wilson (yellow card) 90+4'	Stadium: Sixfields; Attendance: 6,996 (799); Referee: Matthew Russell

25 February 2025 26	Northampton Town	1–2	Barnsley	Northampton
19:45 GMT	D.Costelloe (yellow card) 68'; S.Hoskins 78'	Report	D.Keillor-Dunn 36', 59'; S.Humphrys (yellow card) 68'; J.Earl (yellow card) 76'; K.Nwakali (yellow card) 86'; M.de Gevigney (red card) 87'	Stadium: Sixfields; Attendance: 5,820 (542); Referee: Declan Bourne
Note: Fixture was originally scheduled for 11 January, but was postponed due to a frozen pitch.

1 March 2025 34	Exeter City	1–1	Northampton Town	Exeter
15:00 GMT	I.Niskanen (yellow card) 69'; S.Cox 87'; R.Cole (yellow card) 89'; C.Watts (yellow card) 89'	Report	D.Costelloe 42' (yellow card) 90'; T.Taylor (yellow card) 51'	Stadium: St James Park; Attendance: 6,834 (490); Referee: Charles Breakspear

4 March 2025 35	Northampton Town	1–1	Stockport County	Northampton
19:45 GMT	T.Taylor 31' (yellow card) 49'; S.Hoskins (yellow card) 38'; M.Dyche (yellow card) 43'	Report	B.Hills (yellow card) 66'; B.Andrésson 79'	Stadium: Sixfields; Attendance: 5,559 (552); Referee: Lee Swabey

8 March 2025 36	Leyton Orient	1–2	Northampton Town	Leyton, London
15:00 GMT	J.Simpson (yellow card) 44'; C.Kelman 60'	Report	T.Roberts 11'; C.McGeehan 45'	Stadium: Brisbane Road; Attendance: 8,911 (1,221); Referee: Alex Chilowicz

15 March 2025 37	Northampton Town	1–1	Birmingham City	Northampton
15:00 GMT	T.Iwata 11' (o.g.); L.Burge (yellow card) 88'	Report	J.Stansfield (yellow card) 45'; K.Anderson 45+2'	Stadium: Sixfields; Attendance: 7,947 (1,374); Referee: Ross Joyce

22 March 2025 38	Northampton Town	0–2	Blackpool	Northampton
15:00 GMT	T.Taylor (yellow card) 32'; S.Hoskins (yellow card) 61'; T.Roberts (yellow card) 65'	Report	A.Fletcher 20'; N.Ennis 61'; J.Lawrence-Gabriel (yellow card) 90'	Stadium: Sixfields; Attendance: 6,714 (511); Referee: Scott Jackson

29 March 2025 39	Cambridge United	1–1	Northampton Town	Cambridge
15:00 GMT	J.Brophy 52'; B.Stevenson (yellow card) 72'; J.Stokes (yellow card) 74'	Report	S.Hoskins 26'	Stadium: Abbey Stadium; Attendance: 7,252 (1,045); Referee: Matthew Russell

1 April 2025 40	Northampton Town	0–2	Rotherham United	Northampton
19:45 BST	T.Eyoma (yellow card) 40'; B.Perry (yellow card) 75'	Report	P.Ruddock Mpanzu 22'; J.Powell (yellow card) 53'; S.Nombe 65'	Stadium: Sixfields; Attendance: 5,720 (339); Referee: Scott Simpson

5 April 2025 41	Peterborough United	0–4	Northampton Town	Peterborough
15:00 BST	T.Edun (red card) 27'	Report	S.Hoskins 15', 34' (pen.); C.McGeehan (yellow card) 27'; D.Costelloe 41'; T.Eaves 90'	Stadium: London Road; Attendance: 9,782 (1,609); Referee: Simon Mather

12 April 2025 42	Northampton Town	0–0	Reading	Northampton
15:00 BST	N.Guinness-Walker (yellow card) 20' (yellow-red card) 77'	Report		Stadium: Sixfields; Attendance: 7,616 (1,545); Referee: Greg Rollason

18 April 2025 43	Charlton Athletic	2–1	Northampton Town	Charlton, London
15:00 BST	L.Berry 9'; C.Coventry (yellow card) 12'; M.Godden 71'; A.Gilbert (yellow card) 77'; K.Ramsay (yellow card) 85'; T.Small (yellow card) 90+4'; C.Aneke (yellow card) 90+6'	Report	D.Costelloe 15' (pen.); A.McGowan (yellow card) 68'; C.McGeehan (yellow card) 90+6'; M.Dyche (yellow card) 90+6'	Stadium: The Valley; Attendance: 20,198 (1,238); Referee: Ollie Yates

21 April 2025 44	Northampton Town	4–1	Shrewsbury Town	Northampton
15:00 BST	A.McGowan 26'; D.Costelloe 44', 83'; T.Magloire (yellow card) 54'; B.Perry (yellow card) 59'; C.McGeehan 70'; M.Dyche (yellow card) 90'	Report	A.Pierre (yellow card) 4'; J.Marquis (yellow card) 32' (goal) 90+1'	Stadium: Sixfields; Attendance: 6,632 (269); Referee: Zac Kennard-Kettle

26 April 2025 45	Crawley Town	3–0	Northampton Town	Crawley
15:00 BST	R.Hepburn-Murphy 39'; J.Kelly 66'; K.Doyle 88'; L.Fraser (yellow card) 90+1'	Report		Stadium: Broadfield Stadium; Attendance: 5,105 (964); Referee: Jacob Miles

3 May 2025 46	Northampton Town	1–1	Wigan Athletic	Northampton
15:00 BST	T.Fosu 33'; T.Magloire (yellow card) 76'	Report	B.Adeeko (yellow card) 24'; J.Carragher (yellow card) 31'; D.Taylor 90+6'; W.Aimson (red card) 90+12'	Stadium: Sixfields; Attendance: 7,591 (895); Referee: Neil Hair

=== FA Cup ===
Northampton Town were drawn at home to Kettering Town in the first round.

2 November 2024 First round	Northampton Town	1–2 (a.e.t.)	Kettering Town	Northampton
17:30 GMT	C.Johnson 28' (o.g.); W.Hondermarck (yellow card) 104'; T.Magloire (yellow card) 116'	Report	L.Miller 66'; C.Johnson (yellow card) 73'; A.Powell (yellow card) 90'; N.Ranger 92'	Stadium: Sixfields; Attendance: 7,104 (1,460); Referee: Elliot Bell
Note: Live on BBC Two

=== EFL Cup ===
On 27 June, the draw for the first round was made, with Northampton being drawn at home against Wycombe Wanderers.

13 August 2024 First round	Northampton Town	0–2	Wycombe Wanderers	Northampton
19:45 BST	M.Pinnock (yellow card) 90+7'	Report	D.Udoh 9'; A.Hartridge (yellow card) 25' (yellow-red card) 78'; L.Mbete 45+1' (o.g.)	Stadium: Sixfields; Attendance: 2,012 (273); Referee: Declan Bourne

=== EFL Trophy ===
In the group stage, Northampton were drawn into Southern Group F alongside Burton Albion, Notts County and Leicester City Under-21s. In the round of 32, Northampton were drawn away to Peterborough United.

==== Group stage ====
Pos	Div	Team	Pld	W	PW	PL	L	GF	GA	GD	Pts	Qualification
1	L1	Burton Albion	3	2	0	0	1	9	5	+4	6	Advance to Round 2
2	L1	Northampton Town	3	2	0	0	1	7	5	+2	6	Advance to Round 2
3	L2	Notts County	3	2	0	0	1	3	3	0	6	
4	ACA	Leicester City U21	3	0	0	0	3	1	7	−6	0	

Source: EFL

8 October 2024 Group stage	Notts County	0–2	Northampton Town	Nottingham
19:00 BST	R.Reynolds (yellow card) 77'	Report	B.Fox 22'; N.Guinness-Walker (yellow card) 36'; W.Hondermarck (yellow card) 45+1'; L.McCarron 59'	Stadium: Meadow Lane; Attendance: 1,614 (206); Referee: Farai Hallam

5 November 2024 Group stage	Northampton Town	3–0	Leicester City U21	Northampton
19:00 GMT	T.Eyoma 30'; N.Dobson 70', 81'	Report		Stadium: Sixfields; Attendance: 1,018 (89); Referee: James Oldham

12 November 2024 Group stage	Northampton Town	2–5	Burton Albion	Northampton
19:15 GMT	N.Dobson 2'; M.Waghorn 47'	Report	N.Akoto 13'; D.Williams 36'; C.Webster 39'; R.Donovan 49'; B.Whitfield 66'	Stadium: Sixfields; Attendance: 778 (59); Referee: James Durkin

==== Knockout stages ====
17 December 2024 Round of 32	Peterborough United	3–0	Northampton Town	Peterborough
19:00 GMT	R.Jones 48'; R.de Havilland 52'; A.Odoh 65'	Report	T.Eyoma (red card) 41'; S.Hoskins (yellow card) 54'	Stadium: London Road; Attendance: 2,549 (294); Referee: Scott Tallis

=== Appearances, goals and cards ===
As of match played 3 May 2025

No.	Pos	Player	League One			FA Cup			EFL Cup			EFL Trophy			Total			Discipline	
No.	Pos	Player	Starts	Sub	Goals	Starts	Sub	Goals	Starts	Sub	Goals	Starts	Sub	Goals	Starts	Sub	Goals	Yellow card	Red card
1	GK	Lee Burge	30	–	–	–	–	–	–	–	–	–	–	–	30	–	–	1	–
2	CB	Tyler Magloire	6	15	1	–	1	–	1	–	–	2	–	–	9	16	1	3	–
3	RB	Aaron McGowan	30	5	1	–	–	–	–	–	–	1	–	–	31	5	1	3	–
4	CM	Jack Sowerby	8	2	–	–	1	–	–	–	–	1	–	–	9	3	–	1	–
5	CB	Jon Guthrie	24	–	1	1	–	–	–	1	–	–	–	–	25	1	1	4	–
6	CB	Jordan Willis	11	4	–	–	–	–	–	–	–	–	1	–	11	5	–	–	–
7	W	Sam Hoskins	32	5	7	–	–	–	–	1	–	1	–	–	33	6	7	7	–
8	AM	Ben Perry	14	3	–	–	–	–	–	–	–	–	–	–	14	3	–	4	–
9	ST	Tom Eaves	14	9	5	–	–	–	–	–	–	1	–	–	15	9	5	3	1
10	W	Mitch Pinnock	45	1	2	1	–	–	1	–	–	1	2	–	48	3	2	5	–
11	ST	James Wilson	–	8	–	–	–	–	1	–	–	1	1	–	2	9	–	–	–
12	LB	Nesta Guinness-Walker	23	4	1	1	–	–	1	–	–	1	–	–	25	4	1	2	1
13	GK	Nik Tzanev	16	1	–	1	–	–	1	–	–	4	–	–	22	1	–	–	–
14	LB	Ali Koiki	2	3	–	–	–	–	–	–	–	–	–	–	2	3	–	–	–
15	W	Dara Costelloe	14	1	6	–	–	–	–	–	–	–	–	–	14	1	6	2	–
16	CM	Terry Taylor	19	–	1	–	–	–	–	–	–	–	–	–	19	–	1	5	–
17	LM	Liam McCarron	4	12	1	1	–	–	–	1	–	2	1	1	7	14	2	–	–
18	CM	Cameron McGeehan	40	–	10	1	–	–	1	–	–	–	1	–	43	–	10	12	–
19	AM	Tyler Roberts	21	6	1	–	–	–	–	–	–	2	–	–	23	6	1	4	1
21	CB	Luke Mbete	9	4	–	–	–	–	1	–	–	–	–	–	10	4	–	2	–
22	RB	Akin Odimayo	32	9	–	1	–	–	1	–	–	1	–	–	35	9	–	3	1
23	CM	Will Hondermarck	12	21	–	–	1	–	–	1	–	4	–	–	16	23	–	2	–
24	W	Tariqe Fosu	17	16	4	1	–	–	1	–	–	1	–	–	20	16	4	1	–
26	CB	Jack Baldwin	11	11	1	1	–	–	1	–	–	–	–	–	13	11	1	3	–
28	CB	TJ Eyoma	17	7	–	–	1	–	–	–	–	2	–	1	19	8	1	2	–
29	CM	Liam Shaw	8	–	2	–	–	–	–	–	–	–	–	–	8	–	2	2	–
30	CM	Samy Chouchane	17	5	–	1	–	–	–	–	–	4	–	–	22	5	–	3	–
33	LB	Patrick Brough	1	4	–	–	–	–	–	–	–	–	–	–	1	4	–	1	–
35	CB	Max Dyche	13	7	–	–	–	–	–	–	–	–	–	–	13	7	–	3	–
36	GK	James Dadge	–	1	–	–	–	–	–	–	–	–	–	–	–	1	–	–	–
39	ST	Callum Morton	5	2	1	–	–	–	1	–	–	–	–	–	6	2	1	–	–
Youth team scholars:
25	CB	Josh Tomlinson	–	–	–	–	–	–	–	–	–	4	–	–	4	–	–	–	–
37	LB	Matthew Ireland	–	–	–	–	–	–	–	–	–	2	1	–	2	1	–	–	–
38	RB	Kiantay Licorish-Mullings	–	1	–	–	–	–	–	–	–	2	2	–	2	3	–	–	–
40	ST	Neo Dobson	–	4	–	–	–	–	–	–	–	2	2	3	2	6	3	1	–
42	ST	Ollie Evans	–	–	–	–	–	–	–	–	–	–	1	–	–	1	–	–	–
43	W	Charlie Carroll	–	–	–	–	–	–	–	–	–	–	2	–	–	2	–	–	–
44	CM	Josh Rayfield	–	–	–	–	–	–	–	–	–	–	1	–	–	1	–	–	–
45	AM	Harry Guess	–	–	–	–	–	–	–	–	–	–	1	–	–	1	–	–	–
46	CM	Freddie Findlay	–	–	–	–	–	–	–	–	–	–	2	–	–	2	–	–	–
47	ST	Fran Obiagwu	–	2	–	–	–	–	–	–	–	–	–	–	–	2	–	–	–
Out on loan:
20	RB	Harvey Lintott	–	1	–	–	–	–	–	–	–	1	–	–	1	1	–	–	–
41	CM	Reuben Wyatt	–	–	–	–	–	–	–	–	–	1	2	–	1	2	–	–	–
Players who featured but departed the club during the season:
8	CM	Ben Fox	10	3	–	1	–	–	1	–	–	2	–	1	14	3	1	3	–
16	CM	Matt Dibley-Dias	1	1	–	–	–	–	–	1	–	–	–	–	1	2	–	–	–
29	ST	Martyn Waghorn	–	6	–	–	1	–	–	–	–	1	–	1	1	7	1	1	–

== Awards ==
=== Club awards ===
At the end of the season, Northampton's annual award ceremony, including categories voted for by the players and backroom staff, the supporters, will see the players recognised for their achievements for the club throughout the 2024–25 season.

Player of the Year Award	Mitch Pinnock
Players' Player of the Year Award	Cameron McGeehan
Academy Player of the Year Award	Fran Obiagwu
Goal of the Season Award	Sam Hoskins (vs. Peterborough United)

== Transfers ==
=== Transfers in ===
Date from	Position	Nationality	Name	From	Fee	Ref.
2 July 2024	CF	(England)	James Wilson	(England) Port Vale	Free transfer	
3 July 2024	GK	(New Zealand)	Nik Tzanev	(England) AFC Wimbledon	Free transfer	
5 July 2024	CM	(Northern Ireland)	Cameron McGeehan	(England) Colchester United	Free transfer	
9 July 2024	CB	(England)	Jack Baldwin	(Scotland) Ross County	Undisclosed	
12 July 2024	CF	(England)	Tom Eaves	(England) Rotherham United	Free transfer	
1 August 2024	LM	(Scotland)	Liam McCarron	(England) Stoke City	Undisclosed	
9 August 2024	W	(Ghana)	Tariqe Fosu	Free agent	Free transfer	
27 September 2024	LB	(England)	Nesta Guinness-Walker	Free agent	Free transfer	
1 November 2024	CB	(England)	TJ Eyoma	Free agent	Free transfer	
1 November 2024	CF	(England)	Martyn Waghorn	Free agent	Free transfer	
3 January 2025	DM	(England)	Liam Shaw	(England) Fleetwood Town	Undisclosed	

=== Loans in ===
Date from	Position	Nationality	Name	Loaned from	On loan until	Ref.
4 July 2024	CF	(England)	Callum Morton	(England) Salford City	End of season	
26 July 2024	CM	(New Zealand)	Matt Dibley-Dias	(England) Fulham	8 January 2025 (Note: On 8 January, Dibley-Dias was recalled back to Fulham.)	
12 August 2024	CB	(England)	Luke Mbete	(England) Manchester City	End of season	
19 August 2024	CM	(Tunisia)	Samy Chouchane	(England) Brighton & Hove Albion	End of season	
30 August 2024	AM	(Wales)	Tyler Roberts	(England) Birmingham City	End of season	
22 January 2025	CM	(Wales)	Terry Taylor	(England) Charlton Athletic	End of season	
3 February 2025	LW	(Republic of Ireland)	Dara Costelloe	(England) Burnley	End of season	
3 February 2025	AM	(England)	Ben Perry	(England) Nottingham Forest	End of season	

=== Transfers out ===
Date from	Position	Nationality	Name	To	Fee	Ref.
30 June 2024	CM	(England)	Peter Abimbola	(England) St Ives Town	Released	
30 June 2024	CM	(England)	Dominic Gape	(England) Eastleigh	Released	
30 June 2024 (Note: The transfer was announced on 15 June, and would become official on 1 July once his contract at the club expired)	LB	(England)	Ryan Haynes	(England) Cheltenham Town	Released	
30 June 2024	CF	(England)	Danny Hylton	(England) Charlton Athletic	Released	
30 June 2024	CB	(England)	Liam Moore	(England) Spalding United	Released	
1 July 2024 (Note: The transfer was announced on 20 May, and would become official on 1 July once his contract at the club expired)	CM	(England)	Shaun McWilliams	(England) Rotherham United	Rejected contract	
1 July 2024 (Note: The transfer was announced on 24 May, and would become official on 1 July once his contract at the club expired)	CF	(Scotland)	Louis Appéré	(England) Stevenage	Rejected contract	
1 July 2024 (Note: The transfer was announced on 21 June, and would become official on 1 July once his contract at the club expired)	CB	(England)	Sam Sherring	(England) Milton Keynes Dons	Rejected contract	
2 July 2024	CB	(Cameroon)	Manny Monthé	(England) Oldham Athletic	Free transfer	
17 December 2024	CF	(England)	Martyn Waghorn	Unattached	Mutual consent	
3 February 2025	CM	(England)	Ben Fox	(England) Harrogate Town	Free transfer	

=== Loans out ===
Date from	Position	Nationality	Name	Loaned to	On loan until	Ref.
1 July 2024 (Note: The loan was announced on 17 June, and would become official on 1 July)	CB	(England)	Max Dyche	(England) Woking	8 January 2025 (Note: On 8 January, Dyche was recalled from his loan at Woking.)	
2 August 2024	CM	(England)	Reuben Wyatt	(England) Redditch United	Work experience	
23 August 2024	CB	(England)	Josh Tomlinson	(England) Needham Market	Work experience	
8 November 2024	GK	(England)	James Dadge	(England) Harborough Town	7 December 2024	
10 January 2025	CM	(England)	Reuben Wyatt	(England) St Albans City	Work experience	
20 January 2025	RB	(England)	Harvey Lintott	(Republic of Ireland) Sligo Rovers	End of season	
