= Alex Murphy (footballer) =

Irish football player (born 2004)

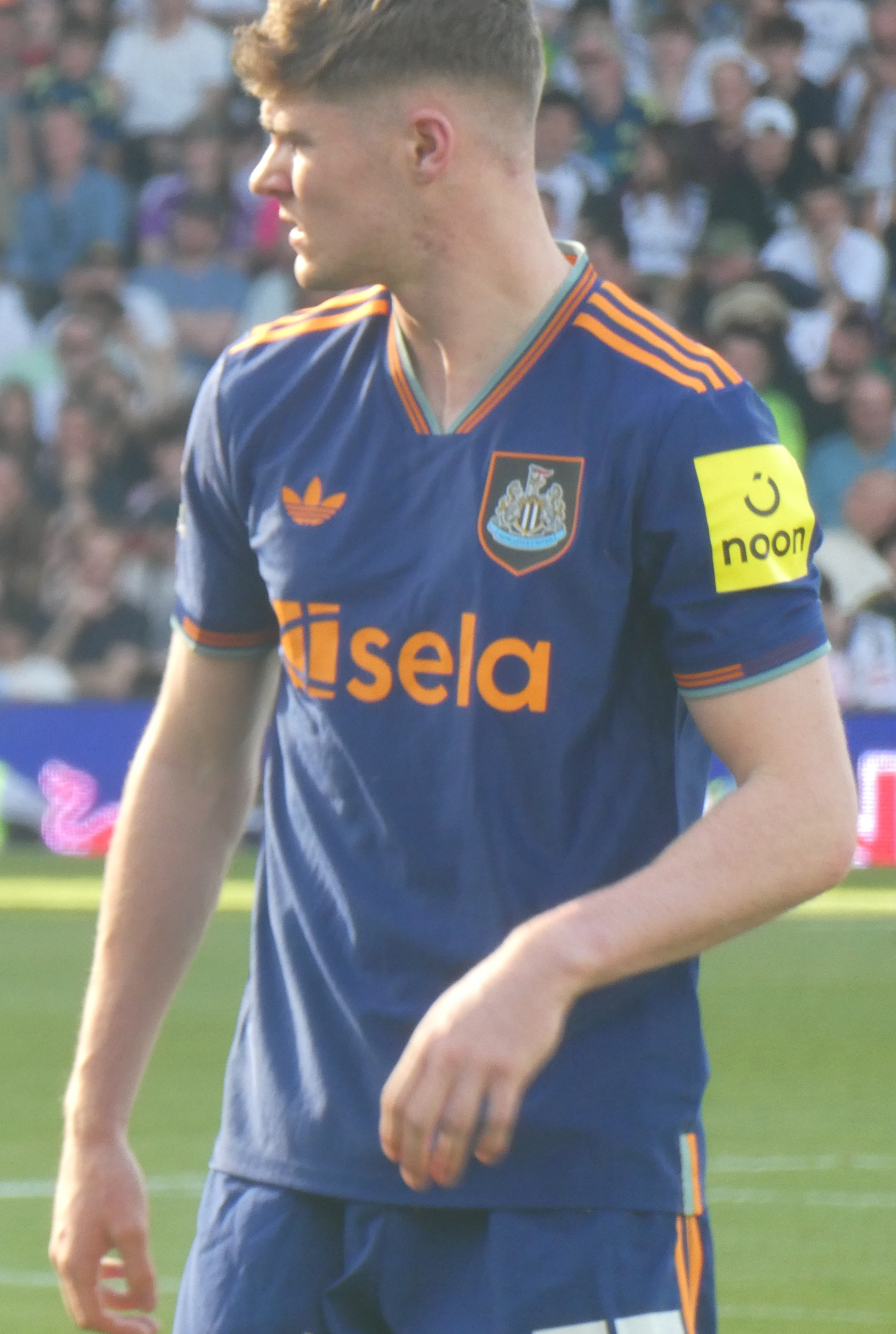
- Murphy playing for Newcastle United in 2026

Personal information
- Date of birth: 25 June 2004 (age 22)
- Place of birth: Galway, Ireland
- Height: 1.88 m (6 ft 2 in)
- Positions: Centre back; left-back

Team information
- Current team: 1. FC Kaiserslautern; (on loan from Newcastle United)
- Number: 3

Youth career
- –2019: Corrib Celtic
- 2019–2021: Galway United

Senior career*
Years	Team	Apps	(Gls)
2021–2022	Galway United	30	(2)
2022–	Newcastle United	4	(0)
2025	→ Bolton Wanderers (loan)	13	(2)
2026–	→ 1. FC Kaiserslautern (loan)	0	(0)

International career^{‡}
2021	Republic of Ireland U18	4	(1)
2021–2023	Republic of Ireland U19	9	(0)
2024–2026	Republic of Ireland U21	17	(1)
- * Club domestic league appearances and goals as of 23:33, 24 May 2026 (UTC) ‡ National team caps and goals as of 00:07, 18 November 2026 (UTC)

Alex Murphy (born 25 June 2004) is an Irish professional footballer who plays as a defender for 2. Bundesliga club 1. FC Kaiserslautern, on loan from Premier League club Newcastle United. He is a youth international footballer for the Republic of Ireland. Primarily a centre-back, he can also play as a left-back.

== Club career ==
=== Galway United ===
From Annaghdown, Murphy's father was a coach at his local club, Corrib Celtic, where Murphy would play until joining Galway United in 2019, debuting at U15 level.

He made his League of Ireland debut and his senior debut for Galway United in June 2021, in a League Of Ireland First Division match against Athlone Town at 16 years-old, as a left back

He signed his first professional contract with the Tribesmen in August 2021.

Interest in Murphy started at the beginning of the 2022 season as offers were made

=== Newcastle United ===
Murphy joined Newcastle United from Galway United in July 2022.

During the 2022–23 season, Murphy trained with the Newcastle first-team squad. He featured in first-team friendly matches, playing in a 5–0 win over Saudi Arabian side Al Hilal SFC in Riyadh in December 2022. He also captained the Newcastle under-21 team, and played at both left-back and centre-back.

After impressing during the 2023–24 pre-season, Murphy made his first senior start in a 2–0 victory over ACF Fiorentina, keeping a clean sheet and playing the full 90 minutes. He made his league debut for Newcastle on 25 November 2023, appearing as a second-half substitute in a 4–1 win in the Premier League against Chelsea. In May 2024 Murphy signed a new long-term contract with Newcastle. On 20 January 2025, he signed for Bolton Wanderers on loan for the rest of the season.

He was included in Newcastle's pre-season tour of the Far East but on 27 July 2025, in Singapore, he scored an own goal in a 3–2 defeat against Arsenal.

On 24 February 2026, he made his first competitive start for the club in their second-leg UEFA Champions League playoff tie against Qarabağ. Playing the full 90 minutes, Murphy helped Newcastle advance to the next round.

On 11 August 2026, Murphy moved on loan to 1. FC Kaiserslautern in the German second tier.

== International career ==
Murphy played as a youth international footballer for the Republic of Ireland, and has captained age-group teams. On 31 August 2023, Murphy received his first call up to the Republic of Ireland U21 squad for their 2025 UEFA European Under-21 Championship qualification fixtures against Turkey U21 and San Marino U21 on 8 and 12 September 2023. He made his debut for the U21 side on 7 June 2024, in a 3–2 win away to Croatia U21 in a friendly.

== Style of play ==
Murphy is said to be comfortable in possession at centre back, with recovery speed. He is able to play as a left back, as well as both right and left centre back.

== Career statistics ==
As of match played 24 May 2026

Appearances and goals by club, season and competition
Club	Season	League			National cup (Note: Includes FAI Cup, FA Cup)		League cup (Note: Includes EFL Cup)		Other		Total	
Club	Season	Division	Apps	Goals	Apps	Goals	Apps	Goals	Apps	Goals	Apps	Goals
Galway United	2021	LOI First Division	10	0	1	0	—		1 (Note: Appearance in League of Ireland Promotion/relegation play-offs)	0	12	0
Galway United	2022	LOI First Division	20	2	—		—		—		20	2
Galway United	Total		30	2	1	0	—		1	0	32	2
Newcastle United U23	2022–23	—							2 (Note: Appearances in EFL Trophy)	0	2	0
Newcastle United U23	2024–25	—							3 (Note: One appearance in EFL Trophy, two appearances in National League Cup)	0	3	0
Newcastle United U23	Total		—						5	0	5	0
Newcastle United	2023–24	Premier League	2	0	0	0	0	0	0	0	2	0
Newcastle United	2024–25	Premier League	0	0	0	0	0	0	—		0	0
Newcastle United	2025–26	Premier League	2	0	1	0	2	0	1 (Note: Appearance in UEFA Champions League)	0	6	0
Newcastle United	Total		4	0	1	0	2	0	1	0	8	0
Bolton Wanderers (loan)	2024–25	League One	13	2	—		—		—		13	2
Career total			47	4	2	0	2	0	7	0	58	4

== Honours ==
Individual

- FAI Under-18 International Player of the Year: 2021
