= Liam McCarron =

Scottish footballer

Personal information
- Full name: Liam James McCarron
- Date of birth: 7 March 2001 (age 25)
- Place of birth: Preston, England
- Height: 5 ft 9 in (1.75 m)
- Positions: Left winger; left wing-back

Team information
- Current team: Wythenshawe

Youth career
- 2014–2018: Carlisle United

Senior career*
Years	Team	Apps	(Gls)
2018–2019	Carlisle United	16	(0)
2019–2022	Leeds United	1	(0)
2022–2024	Stoke City	0	(0)
2022–2023	→ Port Vale (loan)	2	(0)
2024–2025	Northampton Town	16	(1)
2026	Boston United	2	(0)
2026–	Wythenshawe	0	(0)

International career
2020	Scotland U19	1	(0)
- * Club domestic league appearances and goals as of 21:31, 29 April 2026 (UTC)

Liam James McCarron (born 7 March 2001) is a professional footballer who plays as a left winger or left wing-back for Northern Premier League Division One West club Wythenshawe. Born in England, McCarron has represented Scotland at under-19 level.

McCarron turned professional at Carlisle United in September 2018 and played twenty first-team games before he was sold to Leeds United in July 2019. He made his Premier League debut in December 2021 and was sold to Stoke City in June 2022. He was loaned out to Port Vale for the 2022–23 season. He spent the 2024–25 campaign with Northampton Town. He entered non-League football by joining Boston United in February 2026. He joined Wythenshawe in September 2026.

== Club career ==
=== Carlisle United ===
McCarron was born in Preston and grew up in Appleby-in-Westmorland. After coming through the academy at Carlisle United, McCarron broke into the first-team under manager John Sheridan, making his first-team debut in the EFL Trophy on 4 September 2018, coming on as an 83rd-minute substitute for Ashley Nadesan in a 3–2 win over Morecambe at Brunton Park. He made his debut in League Two eleven days later, in a 2–0 home defeat to Tranmere Rovers. Later that month he signed an 18-month contract, with the option of a further year. He was given his first start in a 3–1 defeat at Sunderland in an EFL Trophy group stage game on 9 October. He was handed his first league start by caretaker-managers Tommy Wright and Paul Murray on 12 January, in a 3–0 defeat at Northampton Town, and retained his place in the starting eleven for the next two matches under new manager Steven Pressley. He ended the 2018–19 season with four starts and 16 substitute appearances to his name. He turned down an improved contract offer from the club.

=== Leeds United ===
McCarron signed for Leeds United for an undisclosed fee on 1 July 2019, agreeing a three-year deal at the club. He signed a new two-year contract with the club in September 2021. Marcelo Bielsa gave McCarron his Premier League debut at Elland Road on 18 December, sending him on as a second-half substitute in a 4–1 defeat to Arsenal. This proved to be his only first-team appearance for the club, in addition to three EFL Trophy appearances for the under-21s.

=== Stoke City ===
On 29 June 2022, McCarron joined Stoke City on a three-year contract for an undisclosed fee. He was told by manager Michael O'Neill that he "would be given a chance to play in the first team", however, O'Neill was sacked on 25 August. On 1 September, McCarron joined League One side Port Vale on loan for the 2022–23 season; he became the first Stoke player to be loaned directly to Potteries derby rivals Port Vale since March 1978. He played two league and two cup games for Port Vale. McCarron made his Stoke debut one and a half years after signing for the club in a FA Cup match against Brighton & Hove Albion on 6 January 2024. New manager Steven Schumacher said that "the door isn't shut for anyone at this club... and I actually thought he did really well". It remained McCarron's only appearance of the 2023–24 season.

=== Northampton Town ===
On 1 August 2024, McCarron signed a one-year deal (with an optional further year) at League One side Northampton Town after being bought for an undisclosed fee. He had impressed manager Jon Brady during a two-week trial. He scored his first goal in senior football on 24 August, in a 2–2 draw at Barnsley. He missed the second half of the 2024–25 season due to injury, and was released upon the expiry of his contract.

McCarron went on trial at Fleetwood Town in July 2025. He trained with the Professional Footballers' Association (PFA) the following month.

=== non-League ===
On 24 February 2026, McCarron signed a deal with National League club Boston United until the end of the 2025–26 season. He made two substitute appearances and was released upon the expiry of his contract.

McCarron had a trial with St Johnstone, though ended up signing with Northern Premier League Division One West club Wythenshawe in September 2026.

== International career ==
McCarron was added to the Scotland under-19 squad in February 2020 and won one cap. On 21 August 2020, McCarron was called up to the Scotland under-21 squad for the first time.

== Style of play ==
Carlisle academy manager Darren Edmondson described McCarron as a "pacey" winger with "a high work rate". He is also able to play at left-back or left-wing-back. McCarron describes his main strength as "running with the ball".

== Career statistics ==
As of match played 3 March 2026

Appearances and goals by club, season and competition
Club	Season	League			FA Cup		EFL Cup		Other		Total	
Club	Season	Division	Apps	Goals	Apps	Goals	Apps	Goals	Apps	Goals	Apps	Goals
Carlisle United	2018–19	League Two	16	0	1	0	0	0	3 (Note: Appearances in the EFL Trophy.)	0	20	0
Leeds United	2019–20	Championship	0	0	0	0	0	0	—		0	0
Leeds United	2020–21	Premier League	0	0	0	0	0	0	—		0	0
Leeds United	2021–22	Premier League	1	0	0	0	0	0	—		1	0
Leeds United	Total		1	0	0	0	0	0	—		1	0
Leeds United U21	2020–21	—			—		—		1	0	1	0
Leeds United U21	2021–22	—			—		—		2	0	2	0
Leeds United U21	Total		—		—		—		3	0	3	0
Stoke City	2022–23	Championship	0	0	0	0	0	0	—		0	0
Stoke City	2023–24	Championship	0	0	1	0	0	0	—		1	0
Stoke City	Total		0	0	1	0	0	0	—		1	0
Port Vale (loan)	2022–23	League One	2	0	1	0	0	0	1	0	4	0
Northampton Town	2024–25	League One	16	1	1	0	1	0	3	1	21	2
Boston United	2025–26	National League	2	0	—		—		—		2	0
Wythenshawe	2026–27	Northern Premier League; Division One West	0	0	0	0	—		0	0	0	0
Career total			37	1	4	0	1	0	10	1	52	2
