= Ben Perry (footballer) =

English footballer (born 2004)

Personal information
- Full name: Benjamin Marshall Perry
- Date of birth: 1 December 2004 (age 21)
- Place of birth: Derby, England
- Height: 1.84 m (6 ft 0 in)
- Position: Midfielder

Team information
- Current team: Colchester United
- Number: 4

Youth career
- 2014–2025: Nottingham Forest

Senior career*
Years	Team	Apps	(Gls)
2025	Nottingham Forest	0	(0)
2025	→ Northampton Town (loan)	17	(0)
2025–	Colchester United	3	(0)
- * Club domestic league appearances and goals as of 16:51, 28 November 2025 (UTC)

Benjamin Marshall Perry (born 1 December 2004) is an English professional footballer who plays as a defensive or central midfielder for Colchester United.

== Career ==
A product of the Nottingham Forest youth academy, he played for the club in Premier League 2 and the EFL Trophy during the 2023–2024 and 2024–25 seasons. On 3 February 2025, he moved on loan to League One club Northampton Town for the rest of the season. He made his senior debut for Northampton on 7 February 2025, coming off the bench in the second half in a 1-0 win against Mansfield Town in EFL League One. On 10 July 2025, Perry joined League Two side Colchester United for an undisclosed fee, signing a three-year deal.

== Style of play ==
After signing him on loan in February 2025, Northampton manager Kevin Nolan praised his versatility in central midfield saying he has the ability to "sit" as well to "go box-to-box" and that he can also play a little further forward "because of his brain and his quality and his work-rate and enthusiasm and tenacity, he can bring something to that role a bit higher".

== Career statistics ==
As of match played 16 August 2025

Appearances and goals by club, season and competition
Club	Season	League			FA Cup		EFL Cup		Other		Total	
Club	Season	Division	Apps	Goals	Apps	Goals	Apps	Goals	Apps	Goals	Apps	Goals
Nottingham Forest U21	2023–24	—			—		—		3 (Note: Appearance(s) in EFL Trophy)	1	3	1
Nottingham Forest U21	2024–25	—			—		—		3	0	3	0
Nottingham Forest U21	Total		—		—		—		6	1	6	1
Nottingham Forest	2024–25	Premier League	0	0	0	0	0	0	—		0	0
Northampton Town (loan)	2024–25	League One	17	0	—		—		—		17	0
Colchester United	2025–26	League Two	3	0	0	0	1	0	0	0	4	0
Career total			20	0	0	0	1	0	6	1	27	1
