= Samy Chouchane =

Tunisian footballer (born 2003)

Personal information
- Full name: Samy Olivier Chouchane
- Date of birth: 5 September 2003 (age 23)
- Place of birth: Neuilly-sur-Seine, France
- Height: 1.80 m (5 ft 11 in)
- Position: Defensive midfielder

Team information
- Current team: Dijon
- Number: 21

Youth career
- AC Boulogne-Billancourt
- 2020–2024: Brighton & Hove Albion

Senior career*
| Years | Team | Apps | (Gls) |
| 2019–2020 | AC Boulogne-Billancourt | 2 | (0) |
| 2024–2025 | Brighton & Hove Albion | 0 | (0) |
| 2024–2025 | → Northampton Town (loan) | 22 | (0) |
| 2025– | Dijon | 29 | (1) |

International career^{‡}
| 2021–2023 | Tunisia U20 | 10 | (1) |
| 2026– | Tunisia | 1 | (0) |
- * Club domestic league appearances and goals as of 22 June 2026 ‡ National team caps and goals as of 13 November 2026

Samy Olivier Chouchane (Arabic: سامي أوليفير شوشان; born 5 September 2003) is a footballer who plays as a defensive midfielder. Born in France, he represents the Tunisia national team.

== Early life ==
As a youth player, Chouchane joined the youth academy of English Premier League side Brighton & Hove Albion, helping the club win the 2021 Under 17s Premier League Cup.

== Club career ==
On 19 August 2024, Chouchane joined League One club Northampton Town on a season-long loan deal.

In June 2025, Chouchane was released from the Brighton academy upon the expiration of his contract.

== International career ==
Chouchane represented Tunisia internationally at the 2023 FIFA U-20 World Cup.

== Style of play ==
Chouchane mainly operates as a midfielder and is known for his passing ability.

== Personal life ==
Chouchane was born to a German mother and a Tunisian father.

== Career statistics ==
As of match played 18 January 2025

Appearances and goals by club, season and competition
| Club | Season | League | | | FA Cup | | EFL Cup | | Other | | Total | |
| Club | Season | Division | Apps | Goals | Apps | Goals | Apps | Goals | Apps | Goals | Apps | Goals |
|---|---|---|---|---|---|---|---|---|---|---|---|---|
| Brighton & Hove Albion | 2022–23 | Premier League | 0 | 0 | 0 | 0 | 0 | 0 | — | | 0 | 0 |
| Brighton & Hove Albion | 2023–24 | Premier League | 0 | 0 | 0 | 0 | 0 | 0 | — | | 0 | 0 |
| Brighton & Hove Albion | Total | | 0 | 0 | 0 | 0 | 0 | 0 | 0 | 0 | 0 | 0 |
| Brighton & Hove Albion U21s | 2022–23 | — | | | | | | | 2 (Note: Appearances in EFL Trophy) | 0 | 2 | 0 |
| Brighton & Hove Albion U21s | 2023–24 | — | | | | | | | 6 | 1 | 6 | 1 |
| Brighton & Hove Albion U21s | Total | — | | | | | | | 8 | 1 | 8 | 1 |
| Northampton Town (loan) | 2024–25 | League One | 22 | 0 | 1 | 0 | 0 | 0 | 4 | 0 | 27 | 0 |
| Career total | | | 22 | 0 | 1 | 0 | 0 | 0 | 12 | 1 | 35 | 1 |
