= Jay Matete =

English footballer (born 2001)

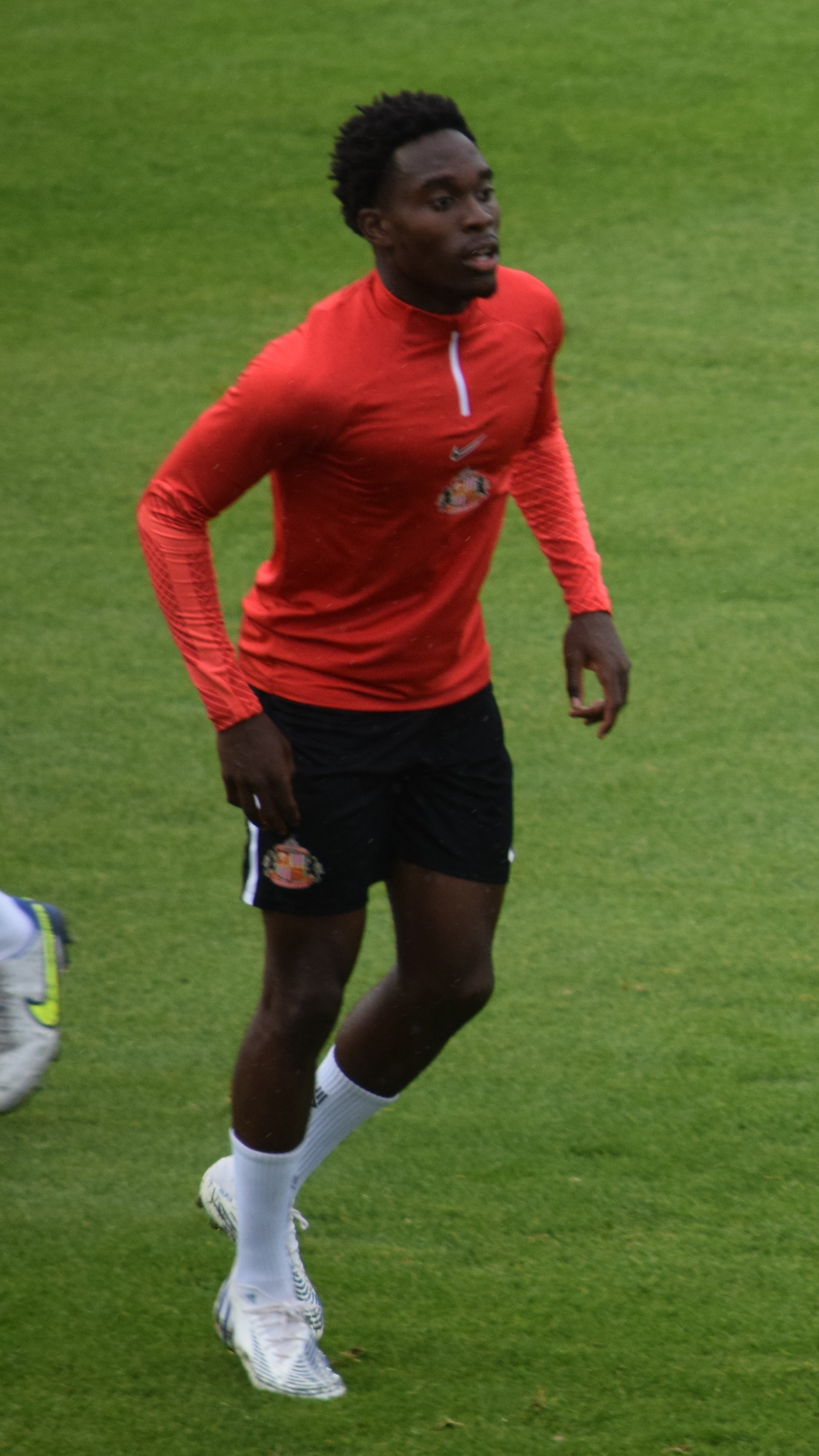
- Matete warming up for Sunderland in 2022

Personal information
- Full name: Jay Matete
- Date of birth: 11 February 2001 (age 25)
- Place of birth: Lambeth, England
- Height: 1.76 m (5 ft 9 in)
- Position: Defensive midfielder

Team information
- Current team: Milton Keynes Dons
- Number: 28

Youth career
- –2018: Reading
- 2018–2019: Fleetwood Town

Senior career*
Years	Team	Apps	(Gls)
2019–2022	Fleetwood Town	27	(1)
2021	→ Grimsby Town (loan)	20	(3)
2022–2026	Sunderland	22	(0)
2023	→ Plymouth Argyle (loan)	19	(1)
2024	→ Oxford United (loan)	6	(0)
2024–2025	→ Bolton Wanderers (loan)	35	(3)
2026–	Milton Keynes Dons	6	(0)
- * Club domestic league appearances and goals as of 22:30, 17 February 2026 (UTC)

Jay Matete (born 11 February 2001) is an English professional footballer who plays as a defensive midfielder for EFL League One club Milton Keynes Dons

Matete was part of the youth academy at Reading before joining Fleetwood Town. He went on to have a loan spell with Grimsby Town before joining Sunderland in 2022. He was also part of the Plymouth Argyle squad that won the EFL League One title in 2023 following a successful loan spell.

== Career ==
=== Fleetwood Town ===
In May 2018, Matete signed for Fleetwood Town's academy, following a spell at Reading. During the 2019–20 EFL Trophy, he made two appearances for Fleetwood Town, once against Liverpool U21 and once against Oldham Athletic.

==== Grimsby Town (loan) ====
On 21 January 2021, Matete signed for Grimsby Town on loan until the end of the 2020–21 season. During his loan spell, Matete made 20 appearances for The Mariners, scoring his first goal for the club just 32 seconds into a EFL League Two match against Bolton Wanderers which Grimsby Town won 2–1.

He scored the winner in a 2–1 win at Oldham Athletic, with a brilliant solo strike having run from the halfway line before hitting a shot into the top corner. A few days later, he scored again away at Exeter City to give The Mariners a 2–1 lead, but was later sent off as Grimsby eventually lost 3–2 confirming relegation from the Football League. The club appealed his red card but this was turned down effectively ending his season.

=== Sunderland ===
On 31 January 2022, Matete signed for fellow EFL League One side Sunderland on a four-year contract for an undisclosed fee.

On 6 January 2023, Matete signed for Plymouth Argyle on loan until the end of the 2022–23 season.

On 8 August 2024, Matete signed for Bolton Wanderers on loan until the end of the 2024–25 season.

=== Milton Keynes Dons ===
On 9 January 2026, Matete joined EFL League Two club Milton Keynes Dons for an undisclosed fee, ending his four-year association with Sunderland. He made his league debut for the club on 17 January 2026, coming on as a 76th-minute substitute in a 2–0 away win over Accrington Stanley.

On 17 February 2026, Matete suffered a hamstring injury during a 0–0 home draw with Crawley Town, which ruled him out for the remainder of the 2025–26 season. Despite missing much of the second half of the season, Matete achieved the third promotion of his career as the club finished second-place and returned to League One.

== Career statistics ==
As of 8 August 2026

Appearances and goals by club, season and competition
Club	Season	League			FA Cup		EFL Cup		Other		Total	
Club	Season	Division	Apps	Goals	Apps	Goals	Apps	Goals	Apps	Goals	Apps	Goals
Fleetwood Town	2019–20	League One	0	0	0	0	0	0	3 (Note: Appearances in Football League Trophy)	0	3	0
Fleetwood Town	2020–21	League One	7	0	0	0	2	0	4	0	13	0
Fleetwood Town	2021–22	League One	20	1	1	0	1	0	3	1	25	2
Fleetwood Town	Total		27	1	1	0	3	0	10	1	41	2
Grimsby Town (loan)	2020–21	League Two	20	3	—		—		—		20	3
Sunderland	2021–22	League One	14	0	—		—		2 (Note: Appearances in EFL League One play-offs)	0	16	0
Sunderland	2022–23	Championship	8	0	0	0	1	0	0	0	9	0
Sunderland	Total		22	0	0	0	1	0	0	0	25	0
Plymouth Argyle (loan)	2022–23	League One	19	1	0	0	0	0	3	0	22	1
Oxford United (loan)	2023–24	League One	6	0	0	0	0	0	0	0	6	0
Bolton Wanderers (loan)	2024–25	League One	35	3	1	0	3	0	6	0	45	3
Milton Keynes Dons	2025–26	League Two	6	0	1	0	—		—		7	0
Milton Keynes Dons	2026–27	League One	0	0	0	0	1	0	0	0	1	0
Milton Keynes Dons	Total		6	0	1	0	1	0	0	0	8	0
Career total			135	8	3	0	8	0	21	1	167	9

== Honours ==
Sunderland

- EFL League One play-offs: 2022

Plymouth Argyle

- EFL League One: 2022–23
- EFL Trophy runner-up: 2022–23
