= Hiram Boateng =

English footballer (born 1996)

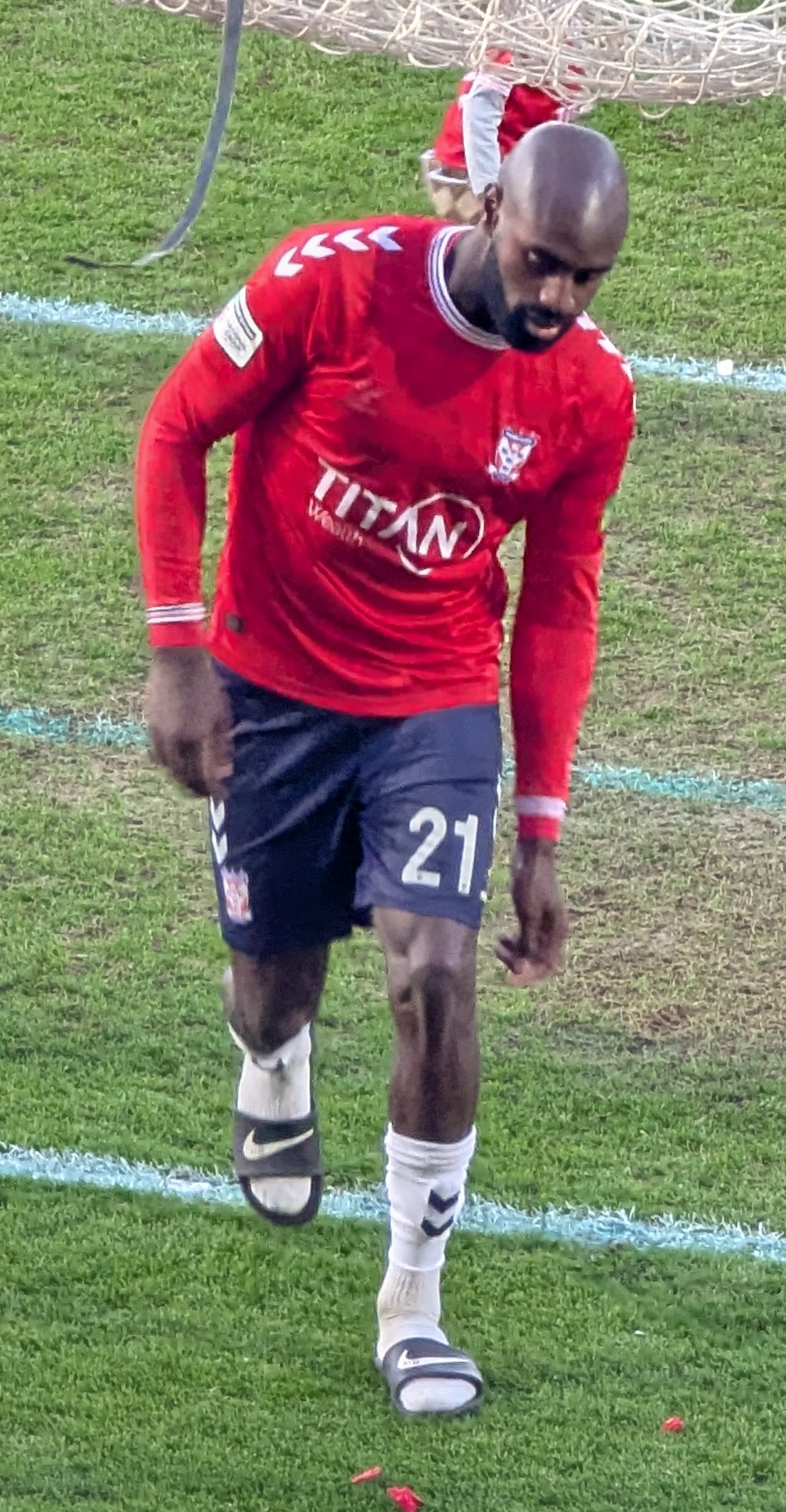
- Boateng in 2026

Personal information
- Full name: Hiram Kojo Kwarteng Boateng
- Date of birth: 8 January 1996 (age 30)
- Place of birth: Wandsworth, England
- Height: 6 ft 0 in (1.83 m)
- Position: Midfielder

Team information
- Current team: York City
- Number: 21

Youth career
- 2004–2013: Crystal Palace

Senior career*
Years	Team	Apps	(Gls)
2013–2017	Crystal Palace	1	(0)
2014–2015	→ Crawley Town (loan)	1	(0)
2015–2016	→ Plymouth Argyle (loan)	16	(1)
2016	→ Plymouth Argyle (loan)	8	(0)
2016	→ Bristol Rovers (loan)	9	(0)
2016–2017	→ Northampton Town (loan)	16	(0)
2017–2019	Exeter City	66	(2)
2019–2022	Milton Keynes Dons	49	(3)
2020–2021	→ Cambridge United (loan)	25	(0)
2022–2025	Mansfield Town	112	(10)
2025–	York City	34	(3)
- * Club domestic league appearances and goals as of 7 May 2025 (UTC)

Hiram Kojo Kwarteng Boateng (born 8 January 1996) is an English professional footballer who plays as a midfielder for EFL League Two club York City.

== Club career ==
=== Crystal Palace ===
Born in Wandsworth, Greater London, Boateng joined the academy of Crystal Palace at the age of 8. Progressing through the academy system and eventually into first team contention, he made his first team debut on 15 January 2013 in a 4–1 FA Cup third round replay defeat away to Stoke City.

At the conclusion of his first season as a professional Boateng was named the club's Academy Player of the Year. The 2013–14 season saw limited but impressive performances from Boateng, and he spent the final months of the season on loan to League One club Crawley Town. Ahead of the 2014–15 campaign, Boateng was involved in several pre-season friendlies for the first team but was later limited to the reserve team for much of the season. In March 2015 he extended his stay with the club until the summer of 2017.

Boateng spent the first half of the 2015–16 season on loan to League Two club Plymouth Argyle. On 3 October 2015, he scored his first professional goal in a 2–1 home win over former loan club Crawley Town. His spell was eventually cut short due to injury and he returned to his parent club. Following his recovery, Boateng made his league debut for Crystal Palace on 6 February 2016, coming on as a 70th-minute substitute in a 1–1 draw away to Swansea City, before returning to Plymouth for the remainder of the season in March 2016 where he later featured in all three of Plymouth's play-off matches. He was later named Crystal Palace's Development Player of the Year for 2015–16.

The following 2016–17 season saw further limited opportunities with Crystal Palace, and Boateng spent the majority of the year on loan to Bristol Rovers and Northampton Town.

=== Exeter City ===
Following the expiry of his contract, on 31 August 2017 Boateng made a deadline-day free transfer to League Two club Exeter City. Following an impressive first two seasons, in April 2019 Exeter City manager Matt Taylor said Exeter would struggle to keep Boateng at the club if they weren't promoted, and by May he had not signed a new contract with Exeter. He made a total of 77 appearances for the club, scoring 3 goals.

=== Milton Keynes Dons ===
In May 2019, having declined the offer of a new contract with Exeter, Boateng joined up with former manager Paul Tisdale at Milton Keynes Dons, in a deal that would see Exeter City receive compensation due to the player's age.

Following the departure of Paul Tisdale, Boateng fell out of favour under new manager Russell Martin, and in October 2020 was sent out on loan to League Two club Cambridge United for the remainder of the 2020–21 season, where he played a key role in his loan club's promotion to League One.

After Russell Martin left Milton Keynes Dons a week prior to the start of the 2021–22 season, Boateng was selected by interim manager Dean Lewington for the club's opening fixture away to Bolton Wanderers on 7 August 2021. Boateng, who had not even been allocated a squad number prior to Martin's departure, came on as an 81st-minute substitute and scored the club's third goal just two minutes later in an eventual 3–3 draw. It was his first appearance for the club since January 2020. That season he went on to make 37 appearances and score 4 goals, contributing to the club achieving a third-place play-off finish. On 13 May 2022, Boateng confirmed he would be leaving the club after three seasons.

=== Mansfield Town ===
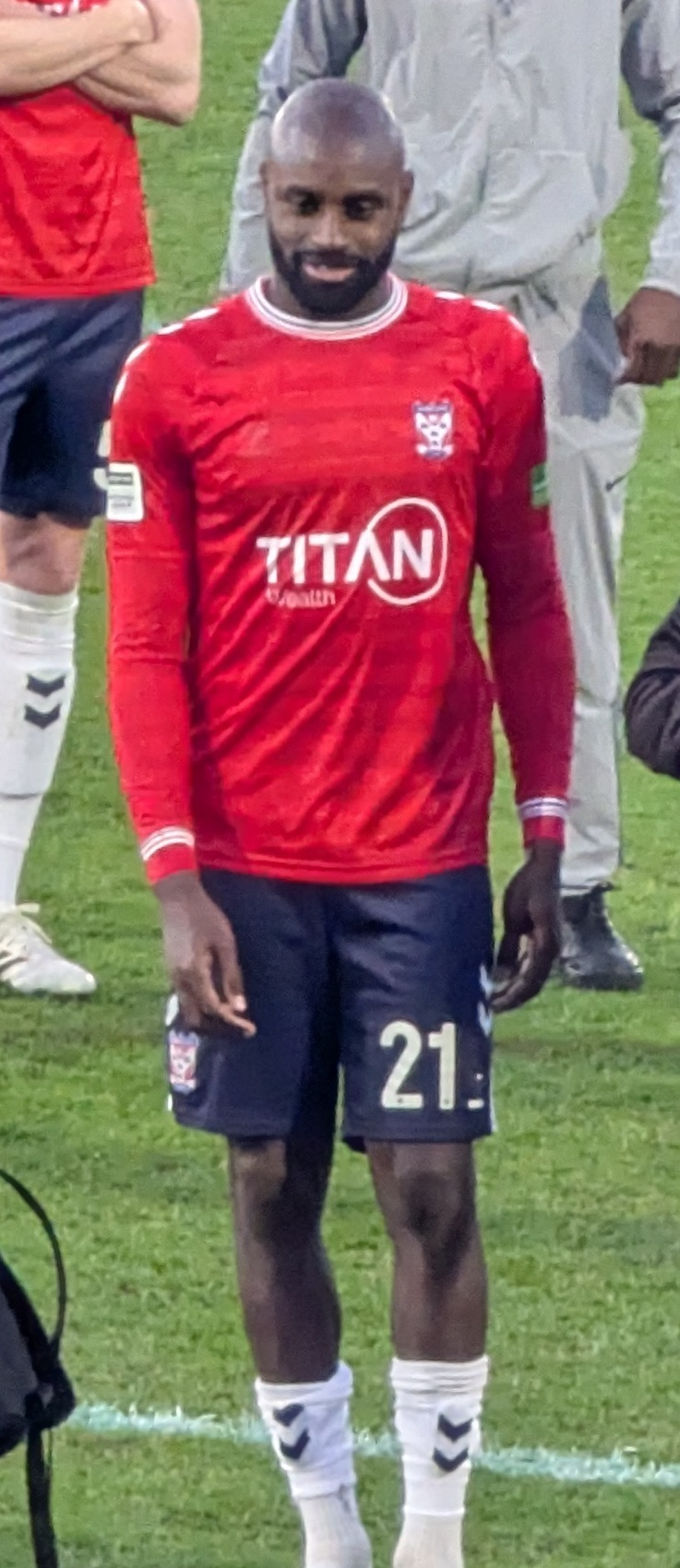
Boateng with York City in 2026

On 15 June 2022, League Two club Mansfield Town announced Boateng had signed a three-year deal with the club effective from 1 July 2022.

Boateng scored a hat trick for Mansfield on 13 February 2024 and picked up the man of the match award as Mansfield beat Harrogate Town 9–2, equalling a club record winning scoreline for the Stags.

Boateng played a key role in Mansfield Town's promotion to League One in the 2023–24 season.

On 7 May 2025, the club announced he would be released in June once his contract expired. He signed for York City the following month.

== International career ==
Boateng is eligible to represent Ghana as he has both a British passport and a Ghanaian passport.

== Career statistics ==
As of match played 8 May 2023

Appearances and goals by club, season and competition
Club	Season	League			FA Cup		League Cup		Other		Total	
Club	Season	Division	Apps	Goals	Apps	Goals	Apps	Goals	Apps	Goals	Apps	Goals
Crystal Palace	2012–13	Championship	0	0	1	0	0	0	0	0	1	0
Crystal Palace	2013–14	Premier League	0	0	1	0	0	0	—		1	0
Crystal Palace	2014–15	Premier League	0	0	0	0	0	0	—		0	0
Crystal Palace	2015–16	Premier League	1	0	0	0	0	0	—		1	0
Crystal Palace	2016–17	Premier League	0	0	0	0	0	0	—		0	0
Crystal Palace	Total		1	0	2	0	0	0	0	0	3	0
Crawley Town (loan)	2013–14	League One	1	0	—		—		—		1	0
Plymouth Argyle (loan)	2015–16	League Two	24	1	0	0	1	0	6 (Note: Three appearances and one goal in Football League Trophy, three appearances in 2015–16 Football League Two play-offs.)	1	31	2
Bristol Rovers (loan)	2016–17	League One	9	0	1	0	—		2 (Note: Appearances in EFL Trophy.)	0	12	0
Northampton Town (loan)	2016–17	League One	16	0	—		—		—		16	0
Exeter City	2017–18	League Two	38	1	4	0	0	0	4 (Note: One appearance in EFL Trophy, three appearances and one goal 2017–18 EFL League Two play-offs.)	1	46	2
Exeter City	2018–19	League Two	28	1	0	0	2	0	1	0	31	1
Exeter City	Total		66	2	4	0	2	0	5	1	77	3
Milton Keynes Dons	2019–20	League One	20	0	1	0	2	1	5	0	28	1
Milton Keynes Dons	2020–21	League One	0	0	0	0	0	0	0	0	0	0
Milton Keynes Dons	2021–22	League One	29	3	1	0	0	0	7 (Note: Five appearances in EFL Trophy, two in 2021–22 EFL League One play-offs.)	1	37	4
Milton Keynes Dons	Total		49	3	2	0	2	1	12	1	65	5
Cambridge United (loan)	2020–21	League Two	25	0	1	0	—		1	0	27	0
Mansfield Town	2022–23	League Two	37	3	1	0	0	0	2	0	40	3
Career total			228	9	11	0	5	1	28	3	272	13

== Honours ==
Cambridge United

- EFL League Two second-place promotion: 2020–21

Mansfield Town

- EFL League Two third-place promotion: 2023–24

York City

- National League: 2025–26

Individual

- Crystal Palace Academy Player of the Year: 2013–14
- Crystal Palace Development Player of the Year: 2015–16
