= Zak Jules =

Scottish footballer

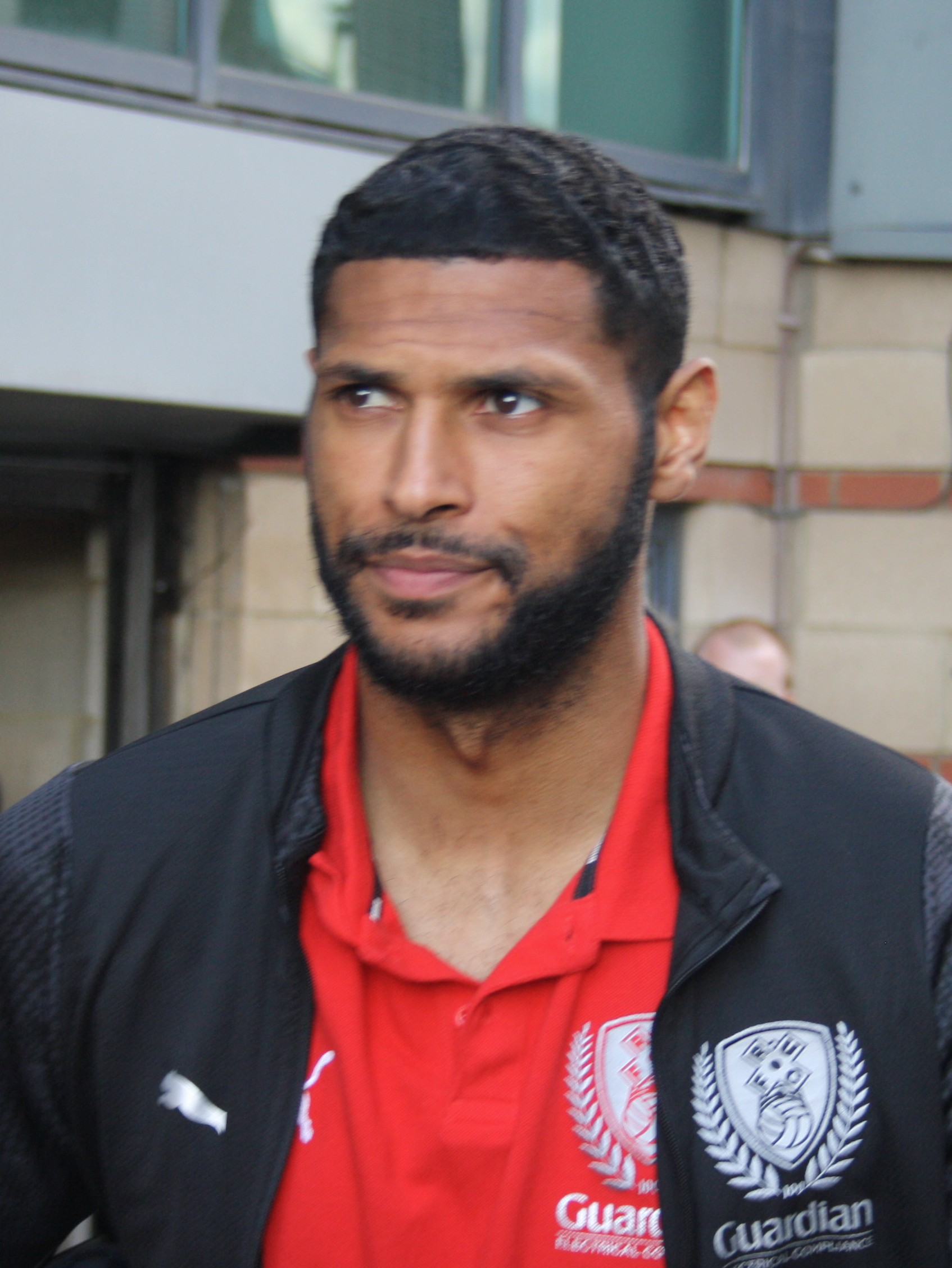
- Jules in 2026

Personal information
- Full name: Zak Kennedy Jules
- Date of birth: 7 February 1997 (age 29)
- Place of birth: Islington, England
- Height: 6 ft 3 in (1.90 m)
- Position: Defender

Team information
- Current team: Eyüpspor

Youth career
- 20??–2015: Reading

Senior career*
Years	Team	Apps	(Gls)
2015–2017	Reading	0	(0)
2015–2016	→ Hemel Hempstead Town (loan)	5	(0)
2016–2017	→ Braintree Town (loan)	3	(0)
2017	→ Motherwell (loan)	10	(1)
2017–2019	Shrewsbury Town	0	(0)
2017	→ Chesterfield (loan)	6	(0)
2018	→ Port Vale (loan)	2	(0)
2018	→ Barnet (loan)	4	(0)
2019	Macclesfield Town	14	(0)
2019–2021	Walsall	34	(1)
2021–2023	Milton Keynes Dons	59	(2)
2022	→ Fleetwood Town (loan)	20	(0)
2023–2024	Exeter City	40	(2)
2024–2026	Rotherham United	57	(3)
2026–	Eyüpspor	3	(1)

International career
2014	Scotland U17	3	(0)
2015–2016	Scotland U19	5	(0)
2017	Scotland U20	3	(0)
2016	Scotland U21	3	(0)
- * Club domestic league appearances and goals as of 30 August 2026 (UTC)

Zak Kennedy Jules (born 7 February 1997) is a professional footballer who plays as a defender for Süper Lig club Eyüpspor. He was born in Islington, England, but has represented Scotland at all levels from under-17 to under-21.

Jules began his career at Reading, from where he was loaned out to Hemel Hempstead Town, Braintree Town and Motherwell. He signed with Shrewsbury Town in June 2017 and spent the 2017–18 season on loan at Chesterfield and Port Vale. He joined Barnet on loan in September 2018 before joining Macclesfield Town after leaving Shrewsbury by mutual consent in January 2019. He signed with Walsall in July 2019, where he stayed for 18 months before being sold to Milton Keynes Dons. He spent the second half of the 2021–22 season on loan at Fleetwood Town and was sold to Exeter City in July 2023. He joined Rotherham United the following summer. He moved to Turkey to join Eyüpspor in July 2026.

== Club career ==
=== Reading ===
Jules came through the Academy at Reading, and on 31 October 2015 was sent on loan to National League South club Hemel Hempstead Town. He made his debut for the club on 31 October, in a 6–2 victory at Gosport Borough. He made a further seven appearances for Dean Brennan's "Tudors", before he returned to the Madejski Stadium on 4 January 2016. He later said that the loan spell "toughened me up a bit". He signed an extension to his professional contract at Reading at the end of the 2015–16 season.

On 2 December 2016, Jules joined Braintree Town on a month-long loan deal. He played in three National League matches during his time at Cressing Road, and also featured in two cup games. Back at Reading, he reported that he had been working closely with "Royals" head coach Jaap Stam, who told him to be more aggressive. On 27 January 2017, Jules joined Scottish Premiership club Motherwell on loan until the end of the 2016–17 season. He endured a difficult start to his time at Fir Park as he conceded a Penalty kick (association football) in the 2–0 defeat at Celtic and scored an own goal in the 5–1 home defeat by Dundee that preceded manager Mark McGhee's departure from the club. He did though score the winning goal in a 2–1 victory at Kilmarnock on 4 March, in what was new manager Stephen Robinson's first game in charge. However, on 6 May, an error by Jules gifted Ross County a 1–0 win at Fir Park that sent the "Steelmen" into the relegation play-off zone with three matches left to play.

=== Shrewsbury Town ===
On 25 June 2017, Jules signed a two-year contract with League One club Shrewsbury Town. He scored in a pre-season friendly with Aston Villa at the New Meadow, though "Shrews" manager Paul Hurst said that "he's a player that we feel needs a lot of work". On 31 August 2017, Jules joined Gary Caldwell's League Two side Chesterfield on loan until 14 January 2018. He made his debut two days later in a 0–0 draw with Coventry City at the Proact Stadium. However, he tore 90% of his hamstring during his sixth appearance for the "Spireites" on 26 September. He was forced to return to Shrewsbury for a lengthy rehabilitation period. However, he was unable to win a first-team place at Shrewsbury due to the team's good form and excellent defensive record. On 19 January 2018, he returned to League Two after joining Port Vale on loan until the end of the 2017–18 season. He began as the "Valiants" first-choice left-back but struggled for form and was substituted after 51 minutes of his second appearance at Vale Park by manager Neil Aspin.

On 21 September 2018, Jules returned to the National League on a three-month loan at Barnet after failing to figure in new Shrewsbury manager John Askey's first-team plans. Jules made five appearances for John Still's "Bees", the last of which came in a 4–2 FA Cup victory over Braintree Town on 20 October. Jules left Shrewsbury by mutual consent on 3 January 2019.

=== Macclesfield Town ===
On 28 January 2019, Jules signed a short-term deal with League Two relegation-threatened club Macclesfield Town. He went on to become an important part of the Macclesfield defence, featuring 14 times to help the "Silkmen" to avoid relegation at the end of the 2018–19 season. His stay at Moss Rose was extended by a further 12-months after manager Sol Campbell opted to take up an option on his contract.

=== Walsall ===
On 27 July 2019, Jules signed a contract of undisclosed length with newly relegated League Two side Walsall after being signed for an undisclosed fee. Manager Darrell Clarke described him as "a young player we want to develop". He began the 2019–20 season in the starting eleven and filled in for an injured Cameron Pring at left-back. However, he went almost three months from 19 October with only one league start and was then taken off at half-time in a 3–1 defeat at Cheltenham Town on 11 January. On 8 September 2020, Jules scored his first goal for the club during a 2–2 home EFL Trophy group stage tie with Bristol Rovers. He became a key player in the first half of the 2020–21 season, filling in at left-back as well as at centre-back. Some higher division clubs were reportedly tracking him.

=== Milton Keynes Dons ===
On 1 February 2021, the final day of the January transfer window, Jules joined League One club Milton Keynes Dons for an undisclosed fee. He made his debut at Stadium MK on 6 February in a 2–2 draw with Sunderland, and scored his first goal three days later in a 4–1 win away at Rochdale. He made his debut at wing-back, though manager Russell Martin said he intended to play Jules as part of a back three in the long-term. Jules was indeed moved to the left side of a back three and said he felt he was adapting well to MK Dons' unique style of play that demanded confidence on the ball from the backline. He ended the 2020–21 season with 15 starts and five substitute appearances as the Dons posted a 13th-place finish in League One.

On 15 January 2022, following limited first-team opportunities at MK Dons under new manager Liam Manning, Jules joined fellow League One club Fleetwood Town on loan for the remainder of the 2021–22 season. He was immediately handed a start by manager Stephen Crainey, and kept a clean sheet in a 1–0 win over Rotherham United at Highbury Stadium. The Blackpool Gazette reported that he "quickly become a key player in the Fleetwood defence". Jules went on to make 20 appearances for Fleetwood, helping the club to finish outside of the relegation zone on goal difference.

Jules established himself back in the Dons first-team during the 2022–23 season, earning praise from captain Dean Lewington in October. On 4 March, he got involved in an off the ball incident during a 1–0 defeat at former club Port Vale and was later given a three-game suspension for violent conduct after admitting an FA charge. Manager Mark Jackson subsequently held a team meeting to lecture the squad on ill-discipline. Jules made 27 league starts and 41 appearances total as the Dons were relegated in 21st-place.

=== Exeter City ===
On 28 July 2023, Jules joined League One side Exeter City for an undisclosed fee; he signed a one-year deal with the option of a second. He had previously played under manager Gary Caldwell at Chesterfield. He entered talks over a new contract in April 2024 after impressing during the 2023–24 campaign.

=== Rotherham United ===
On 18 June 2024, Jules agreed to join League One side Rotherham United on a two-year deal following the expiration of his Exeter City contract. He did not make his debut until October as he spent time away from the game due to the death of his mother, being named man of the match in a 1–0 win at Leyton Orient. His performances kept Jamie McCart out of the team and caused manager Steve Evans to say "his mum has sadly gone upstairs but he's making her very, very proud". He played 29 games until March, when he was ruled out of the rest of the 2024–25 season with a hamstring injury, leaving him unable to feature under new manager Matt Hamshaw.

He started the 2025–26 season in indifferent form, though he was praised by Hamshaw for his performance in a 1–0 win over Leyton Orient. He played 39 games over the course of the 2025–26 campaign, which culminated in relegation. He was released upon the expiry of his contract.

=== Eyüpspor ===
On 8 July 2026, Jules joined Süper Lig side Eyüpspor.

== International career ==
Jules was born in Islington, but became eligible to play for Scotland through his mother, who came from Glasgow. He represented the under-17 team and was selected by Scot Gemmill in the Scotland squad for the 2014 UEFA European Under-17 Championship in Malta. The team were knocked out at the semi-final stage. He went on to win caps at under-18 and under-19 level, before going on to make his under-21 debut in a 2–0 defeat to Iceland on 5 October 2016. He was selected in the Scotland squad for the 2017 Toulon Tournament in France, and played in the group stage games against the Czech Republic and Indonesia. The team beat the Czech this time to secure the bronze medal. It was the nation's first ever medal at the competition.

== Style of play ==
A 6 ft 3 in (1.91 m) central-defender, Jules describes himself as "fast and good on the ball" and has said that "I am quite quick and quite powerful, I have a half-decent left foot and I like to play a bit as well". A left-footed player, he can also fill in at left-back.

== Career statistics ==
As of match played 2 May 2026

Appearances and goals by club, season and competition
Club	Season	League			National cup (Note: Includes FA Cup, Scottish Cup, Turkish Cup)		League cup (Note: Includes Football League Cup, Scottish League Cup)		Other		Total	
Club	Season	Division	Apps	Goals	Apps	Goals	Apps	Goals	Apps	Goals	Apps	Goals
Reading	2015–16	Championship	0	0	0	0	0	0	—		0	0
Reading	2016–17	Championship	0	0	0	0	0	0	–		0	0
Reading	Total		0	0	0	0	0	0	0	0	0	0
Hemel Hempstead Town (loan)	2015–16	National League South	5	0	0	0	—		3 (Note: 2 appearances in the FA Trophy and 1 appearance in the Herts Senior Cup)	0	8	0
Braintree Town (loan)	2016–17	National League	3	0	1	0	—		1 (Note: Appearance(s) in the FA Trophy)	0	5	0
Motherwell (loan)	2016–17	Scottish Premiership	10	1	0	0	0	0	—		10	1
Shrewsbury Town	2017–18	League One	0	0	0	0	0	0	0	0	0	0
Shrewsbury Town	2018–19	League One	0	0	0	0	0	0	0	0	0	0
Shrewsbury Town	Total		0	0	0	0	0	0	0	0	0	0
Chesterfield (loan)	2017–18	League Two	6	0	0	0	—		0	0	6	0
Port Vale (loan)	2017–18	League Two	2	0	0	0	0	0	0	0	2	0
Barnet (loan)	2018–19	National League	4	0	1	0	—		0	0	5	0
Macclesfield Town	2018–19	League Two	14	0	—		—		—		14	0
Walsall	2019–20	League Two	17	0	1	0	1	0	3 (Note: Appearance(s) in the EFL Trophy)	0	22	0
Walsall	2020–21	League Two	17	1	1	0	1	0	1	1	20	2
Walsall	Total		34	1	2	0	2	0	4	1	42	2
Milton Keynes Dons	2020–21	League One	20	1	—		—		—		20	1
Milton Keynes Dons	2021–22	League One	7	0	0	0	0	0	5	1	12	1
Milton Keynes Dons	2022–23	League One	32	1	0	0	4	0	5	1	41	2
Milton Keynes Dons	Total		59	2	0	0	4	0	10	2	73	4
Fleetwood Town (loan)	2021–22	League One	20	0	—		—		—		20	0
Exeter City	2023–24	League One	40	2	1	0	4	0	2	0	47	2
Rotherham United	2024–25	League One	22	2	1	0	0	0	6	1	29	3
Rotherham United	2025–26	League One	35	1	0	0	1	0	3	0	39	1
Rotherham United	Total		57	3	1	0	1	0	9	1	68	4
Eyüpspor	2026–27	Süper Lig	0	0	0	0	—		—		0	0
Career total			254	9	6	0	11	0	29	4	300	13
