= Harry Darling =

English footballer (born 1999)

Personal information
- Full name: Harry Jack Darling
- Date of birth: 8 August 1999 (age 27)
- Place of birth: Cambridge, England
- Height: 6 ft 2 in (1.88 m)
- Position: Centre-back

Team information
- Current team: Norwich City
- Number: 6

Youth career
- 2011–2012: Cambridge United
- –2015: Newmarket Town
- 2015–2016: Cambridge United

Senior career*
Years	Team	Apps	(Gls)
2016–2021	Cambridge United	55	(2)
2017	→ Bishop's Stortford (loan)	2	(0)
2017	→ Hampton & Richmond Borough (loan)	2	(0)
2017	→ Royston Town (loan)	8	(0)
2018	→ East Thurrock United (loan)	5	(0)
2021–2022	Milton Keynes Dons	64	(7)
2022–2025	Swansea City	108	(12)
2025–	Norwich City	42	(2)
- * Club domestic league appearances and goals as of 16:13, 7 November 2026 (UTC)

Harry Jack Darling (born 8 August 1999) is an English professional footballer who plays as a centre-back for EFL Championship club Norwich City.

== Career ==
=== Cambridge United ===
Darling joined Cambridge United at the age of 12, but left a year later. After being spotted again playing for Newmarket Town's youth team, he rejoined the club in 2015. Darling joined the first team for pre-season ahead of the 2016–17 campaign. He signed his first professional contract with the club in October 2016. and on 8 November 2016, he made his debut in a 2–0 EFL Trophy defeat to Scunthorpe United. He signed for Bishop's Stortford on a one-month loan in January 2017.

On 8 August 2017, Darling started in a 4–1 EFL Cup defeat at Bristol Rovers, and extended his contract with the club until 2021 shortly after. Darling joined Hampton & Richmond Borough on a month-long loan on 9 September 2017, and later joined Royston Town on loan in November 2017. He made his full league debut for the club on 13 January 2018 in a 0–0 draw against Mansfield Town. Darling joined East Thurrock United on a one-month loan in March 2018, having made 5 appearances for Cambridge so far in the 2017–18 season.

On 17 August 2019, he scored his first professional goal, an 86th-minute winner against Colchester United.

=== Milton Keynes Dons ===
On 22 January 2021, Darling joined EFL League One club Milton Keynes Dons for an undisclosed fee, and made his debut four days later in a 0–1 home defeat to Charlton Athletic. He was named MK Dons' Young Player of the Year for the 2020–21 season having made 21 appearances.

On 31 August 2021, whilst captaining the side, Darling scored his first goal for the club, on his 100th start as a professional, in a 2–1 EFL Trophy group stage win away over Burton Albion. He scored his first league goal on 27 November 2021, in a 4–0 away win over Morecambe.

After an impressive first full season at the club in which he scored 10 goals in all competitions from centre-back, Darling was named in both the EFL League One Team of the Season and PFA Team of the Year for 2021–22 alongside teammate Scott Twine.

=== Swansea City ===
On 18 June 2022, Darling signed for EFL Championship club Swansea City on a three-year deal for an undisclosed fee, reuniting with former coach Russell Martin. On 16 June 2025, Swansea City announced Darling had left the club after his contract expired.

=== Norwich City ===
On 16 June 2025, Darling signed for fellow EFL Championship club Norwich City on a three-year deal with an option of an additional year upon his Swansea City contract expiring on 30 June. On 16th August 2025, Darling scored his first goal for the club with a header away at Portsmouth.

== Career statistics ==
As of match played 7 November 2026

Appearances and goals by club, season and competition
Club	Season	League			FA Cup		League Cup		Other		Total	
Club	Season	Division	Apps	Goals	Apps	Goals	Apps	Goals	Apps	Goals	Apps	Goals
Cambridge United	2016–17	League Two	0	0	0	0	0	0	1 (Note: Appearance(s) in EFL Trophy)	0	1	0
Cambridge United	2017–18	League Two	3	0	0	0	1	0	1	0	5	0
Cambridge United	2018–19	League Two	12	0	0	0	1	0	4	0	17	0
Cambridge United	2019–20	League Two	24	2	1	0	2	0	3	0	30	2
Cambridge United	2020–21	League Two	16	0	0	0	0	0	4	1	20	1
Cambridge United	Total		55	2	1	0	4	0	13	1	73	3
Bishops Stortford (loan)	2016–17	National League South	2	0	—		—		—		2	0
Hampton & Richmond (loan)	2017–18	National League South	2	0	—		—		—		2	0
Royston Town (loan)	2017–18	Southern Premier	8	0	—		—		2 (Note: Two appearances and a goal in FA Trophy, one appearance in Southern League Cup.)	1	10	1
East Thurrock United (loan)	2017–18	National League South	5	0	—		—		—		5	0
Milton Keynes Dons	2020–21	League One	23	0	—		—		0	0	23	0
Milton Keynes Dons	2021–22	League One	41	7	2	2	1	0	5 (Note: Three appearances and a goal in EFL Trophy, two appearances in 2021–22 EFL League One play-offs.)	1	49	10
Milton Keynes Dons	Total		64	7	2	2	1	0	5	1	72	10
Swansea City	2022–23	Championship	31	4	1	0	1	0	—		33	4
Swansea City	2023–24	Championship	38	3	0	0	2	0	—		40	3
Swansea City	2024–25	Championship	39	5	0	0	0	0	—		39	5
Swansea City	Total		108	12	1	0	3	0	0	0	112	12
Norwich City	2025–26	Championship	35	1	1	0	2	0	—		38	1
Norwich City	2026–27	Championship	7	1	0	0	3	0	—		1	0
Norwich City	Total		42	2	1	0	5	0	0	0	39	1
Career total			286	23	5	2	13	0	20	3	324	28

== Honours ==
Cambridge United

- EFL League Two runners-up: 2020–21

Individual

- EFL League One Team of the Season: 2021–22
- PFA Team of the Year: 2021–22 League One
- Milton Keynes Dons Players' Player of the Year: 2021–22
- Milton Keynes Dons Young Player of the Year: 2020–21
