= John Freeman (footballer) =

English footballer

Personal information
- Full name: John David Freeman
- Date of birth: 4 November 2001 (age 25)
- Place of birth: Stevenage, England
- Height: 5 ft 11 in (1.80 m)
- Position: Midfielder

Youth career
- 2010–2019: Milton Keynes Dons

Senior career*
Years	Team	Apps	(Gls)
2019–2022	Milton Keynes Dons	4	(0)
2019	→ Kempston Rovers (loan)	1	(0)
2020	→ Wantage Town (loan)	5	(1)
2020	→ St Neots Town (loan)	1	(0)
2021	→ Woking (loan)	8	(0)
2022	→ Chelmsford City (loan)	3	(0)
2022	Cambridge City	0	(0)
2023	Staines Town	0	(0)
- * Club domestic league appearances and goals

John David Freeman (born 4 November 2001) is an English semi-professional footballer who plays as a midfielder for Northern Premier League Division One Midlands club Cambridge City.

== Club career ==
=== Milton Keynes Dons ===
Born in Stevenage, Freeman joined the academy of Milton Keynes Dons at the age of nine and progressed through several age groups at the club. During his later academy years, he suffered two long-term injuries, firstly a ruptured knee ligament followed by a broken leg.

In September 2020, Freeman was given the squad number 30 ahead of the 2020–21 season having signed his first professional deal in the summer. He made his professional first team debut for the club the following day in an EFL Cup first round home tie against Coventry City.

On 15 April 2021, Freeman signed a contract extension keeping him at the club beyond the 2020–21 campaign, before joining National League side Woking on loan for the remainder of the season. The following 2021–22 campaign saw limited first team opportunities for Freeman and at the halfway point he spent several weeks out on loan to National League South club Chelmsford City. Freeman was later one of six players released by MK Dons at the end of the season.

=== Cambridge City ===
In August 2022, Freeman joined Northern Premier League Division One Midlands club Cambridge City.

== Career statistics ==
As of 17 August 2022

Appearances and goals by club, season and competition
Club	Season	League			FA Cup		League Cup		Other		Total	
Club	Season	Division	Apps	Goals	Apps	Goals	Apps	Goals	Apps	Goals	Apps	Goals
Milton Keynes Dons	2019–20	League One	0	0	0	0	0	0	0	0	0	0
Milton Keynes Dons	2020–21	League One	4	0	1	0	1	0	5 (Note: Appearance(s) in EFL Trophy)	0	11	0
Milton Keynes Dons	2021–22	League One	0	0	0	0	0	0	0	0	0	0
Milton Keynes Dons	Total		4	0	1	0	1	0	5	0	11	0
Kempston Rovers (loan)	2019–20	Southern League Division One Central	1	0	—		—		—		1	0
Wantage Town (loan)	2019–20	Southern League Division One Central	5	1	—		—		—		5	1
St Neots Town (loan)	2019–20	Southern League Division One Central	1	0	—		—		—		1	0
Woking (loan)	2020–21	National League	8	0	—		—		—		8	0
Chelmsford City (loan)	2021–22	National League South	3	0	—		—		1 (Note: Appearance(s) in Essex Senior Cup)	0	4	0
Cambridge City	2022–23	Northern Premier Division One Midlands	1	0	0	0	0	0	0	0	1	0
Career total			24	1	1	0	1	0	6	0	32	1
