= Charlie Brown (footballer, born 1999) =

English footballer

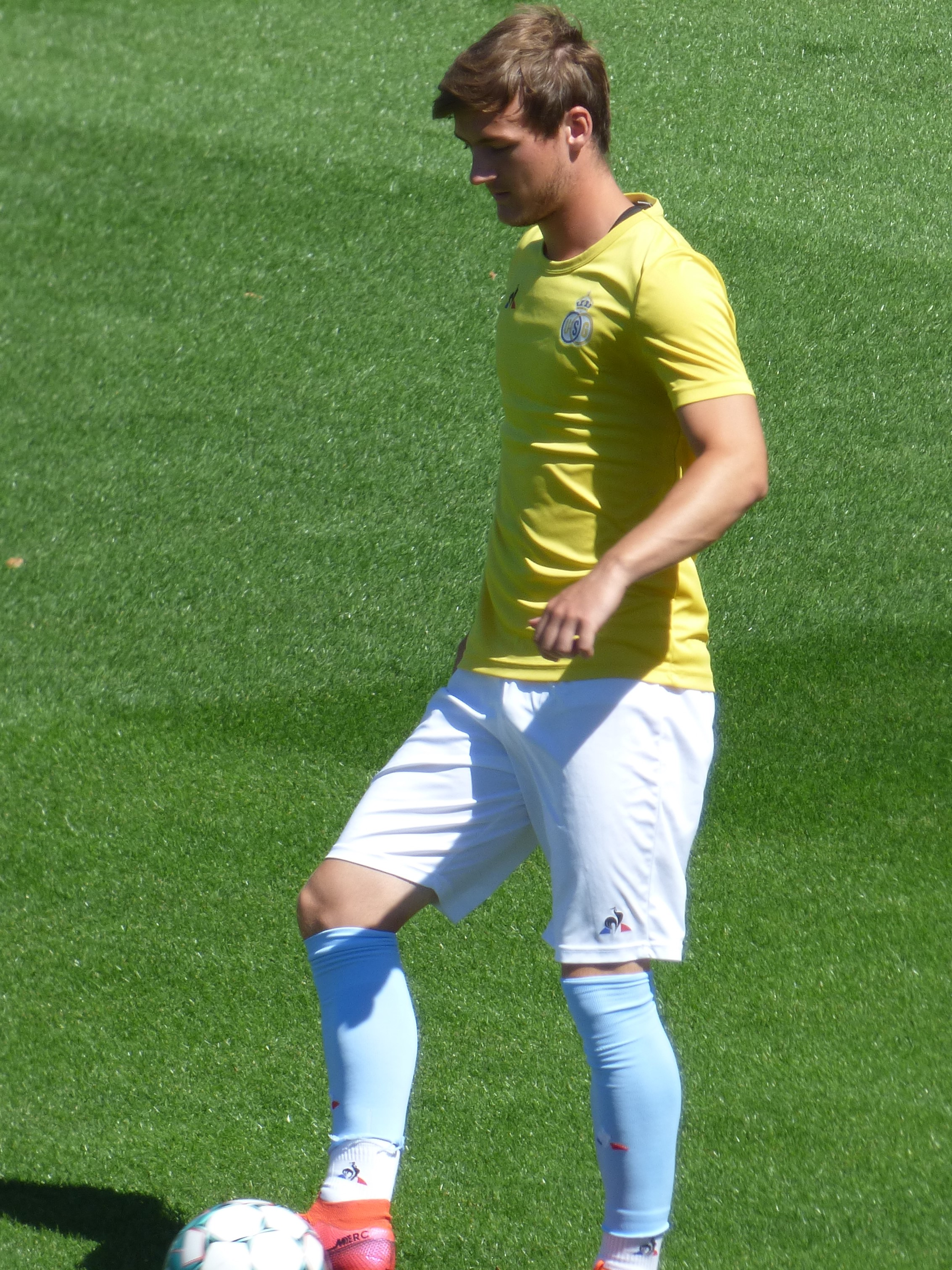
- Brown in 2020

Personal information
- Full name: Charlie Daniel Brown
- Date of birth: 30 September 1999 (age 27)
- Place of birth: Ipswich, England
- Height: 1.83 m (6 ft 0 in)
- Position: Forward

Team information
- Current team: Accrington Stanley
- Number: 20

Youth career
- –2016: Ipswich Town
- 2016–2020: Chelsea

Senior career*
Years	Team	Apps	(Gls)
2020–2021	Chelsea	0	(0)
2020	→ Union SG (loan)	3	(0)
2021–2022	Milton Keynes Dons	26	(3)
2022–2023	Cheltenham Town	23	(1)
2023–2025	Morecambe	29	(6)
2025–	Accrington Stanley	39	(0)
- * Club domestic league appearances and goals as of 16:52, 3 May 2026 (UTC)

Charlie Daniel Brown (born 23 September 1999) is an English professional footballer who plays as a forward for EFL League Two club Accrington Stanley.

== Club career ==
=== Chelsea ===
Brown spent his early years with the academy of Ipswich Town before joining Chelsea in 2016. He was a prolific goalscorer for the club's academy teams and development squad, scoring 53 goals in 108 appearances for Chelsea's U18, U19 and U23 sides.

Following the culmination of the 2018–19 UEFA Youth League, Brown was awarded the Golden Boot for Chelsea U23s having scored 12 goals in 9 appearances during the competition. As of January 2021 he is the all-time joint record scorer for the competition with 15 goals, along with Borja Mayoral and Roberto.

On 31 January 2020, Brown joined Belgian First Division B side Union SG on loan until the end of the season. On 8 February 2020, he made his professional league debut, as a substitute in a 0-0 draw with Virton. After three appearances, the loan deal was extended for another season in July 2020. However, after failing to make an appearance in the opening months of the season, his loan deal was terminated in October 2020 and he returned to Chelsea.

=== Milton Keynes Dons ===
On 13 January 2021, Brown joined League One club Milton Keynes Dons on a permanent deal. He made his debut for the club on 16 January 2021 as a 76th-minute substitute in a 3–0 defeat away to Peterborough United. On 20 February 2021, Brown scored the winning goal - his first at senior level as a professional - in a 4–3 home win over Northampton Town.

=== Cheltenham Town ===
On 6 January 2022, Brown joined League One club Cheltenham Town, signing for an undisclosed fee.

He was released at the end of the 2022–23 season.

=== Morecambe ===
On 23 June 2023, Brown signed for League Two club Morecambe on a one-year deal. On 13 January 2024, he scored his first goal for Morecambe against Mansfield Town. On 5 March 2024, he extended his contract with the club until the summer of 2025.

=== Accrington Stanley ===
On 3 January 2025, Brown joined fellow League Two side Accrington Stanley on a two-and-a-half year deal for an undisclosed fee.

== Personal life ==
He is the older brother of fellow footballer Zak Brown.

== Career statistics ==
As of 12 November 2025.

Appearances and goals by club, season and competition
Club	Season	League			National Cup		League Cup		Other		Total	
Club	Season	Division	Apps	Goals	Apps	Goals	Apps	Goals	Apps	Goals	Apps	Goals
Chelsea U23	2018–19	—	—		—		—		5 (Note: Appearances in the EFL Trophy)	4	5	4
Chelsea U23	2019–20	—	—		—		—		4	2	4	2
Chelsea U23	2020–21	—	—		—		—		1	0	1	0
Chelsea U23	Total		—		—		—		10	6	10	6
Union SG (loan)	2019–20	Proximus League	3	0	0	0	—		0	0	3	0
Union SG (loan)	2020–21	Proximus League	0	0	0	0	—		0	0	0	0
Union SG (loan)	Total		3	0	0	0	—		0	0	3	0
Milton Keynes Dons	2020–21	League One	20	3	—		—		0	0	20	3
Milton Keynes Dons	2021–22	League One	6	0	1	0	1	0	4	0	12	0
Milton Keynes Dons	Total		26	3	1	0	1	0	4	0	32	3
Cheltenham Town	2021–22	League One	3	0	0	0	0	0	0	0	3	0
Cheltenham Town	2022–23	League One	20	1	1	0	1	0	6	4	28	5
Cheltenham Town	Total		23	1	1	0	1	0	6	4	31	5
Morecambe	2023–24	League Two	25	6	1	0	1	0	2	1	29	7
Morecambe	2024–25	League Two	4	0	0	0	0	0	3	1	7	1
Morecambe	Total		29	6	1	0	1	0	5	2	36	8
Accrington Stanley	2024-25	League Two	12	0	0	0	0	0	0	0	12	0
Accrington Stanley	2025-26	League Two	12	0	0	0	2	0	1	0	15	0
Accrington Stanley	Total		24	0	0	0	2	0	1	0	27	0
Career total			105	10	3	0	5	0	26	12	139	22

== Honours ==
Chelsea U18

- FA Youth Cup: 2017–18
- U18 Premier League: 2017–18
- U18 Premier League Cup: 2017–18
- U18 Premier League South: 2017–18

Individual

- UEFA Youth League Golden Boot: 2018–19
