= Jay Bird (footballer) =

English footballer (born 2001)

Personal information
- Full name: Jay Gregory Maison Bird
- Date of birth: 6 May 2001 (age 25)
- Place of birth: Milton Keynes, England
- Height: 6 ft 1 in (1.86 m)
- Position: Forward

Team information
- Current team: Boreham Wood (on loan from Salford City)

Youth career
- 2008–2019: Milton Keynes Dons

Senior career*
Years	Team	Apps	(Gls)
2019–2022	Milton Keynes Dons	2	(0)
2019	→ Hitchin Town (loan)	11	(1)
2019	→ Hitchin Town (loan)	2	(0)
2021–2022	→ Wealdstone (loan)	8	(0)
2022–2023	Dagenham and Redbridge	13	(2)
2023–2024	Arbroath	33	(6)
2024–2025	Exeter City	14	(0)
2025	→ Rochdale (loan)	9	(4)
2025–	Salford City	8	(0)
2026–	→ Boreham Wood (loan)	6	(5)
- * Club domestic league appearances and goals as of 20:19, 30 September 2026 (UTC)

Jay Gregory Maison Bird (born 6 May 2001) is an English professional footballer who plays as a striker for Boreham Wood on loan from EFL League Two club Salford City.

== Club career ==
=== Milton Keynes Dons ===
Born in Milton Keynes, Bird joined the academy of Milton Keynes Dons at the age of eight, and progressed through several age groups before signing professional terms with the club on 25 June 2019. In August 2019 he joined Southern Premier Central club Hitchin Town on loan for the 2019–20 campaign, but after only two matches a serious injury resulted in Bird being ruled out for the rest of the season.

On 6 October 2020, Bird made his first team professional debut for the club, scoring twice in a 3–2 EFL Trophy group stage away victory over Stevenage. The following 2021–22 season saw limited first team opportunities for Bird, with the player spending the first half of the season out on loan to National League club Wealdstone. At the end of the season Bird was one of six players released by MK Dons.

=== Dagenham & Redbridge ===
On 19 November 2022, Bird signed for National League club Dagenham & Redbridge on a non-contract basis. Bird made his debut that same day off the bench, scoring a late winner as his new side defeated Scunthorpe United.

=== Arbroath ===
Bird signed a one-year contract with Arbroath in July 2023. He departed the club at the end of his contract.

=== Exeter City ===
On 2 July 2024, Bird signed a one-year contract with EFL League One club Exeter City, with the option of a further year.

On 25 February 2025, Bird joined National League side Rochdale on loan for the remainder of the season.

=== Salford City ===
On 26 June 2025, Bird signed for League Two side Salford City on a two-year deal for an undisclosed fee.

On 4 September 2026, Bird joined National League club Boreham Wood on an original one-month loan.

== Career statistics ==
As of end of 2025–26 season

Appearances and goals by club, season and competition
Club	Season	League			National Cup (Note: Includes FA Cup)		League Cup (Note: Includes Scottish League Cup)		Other		Total	
Club	Season	Division	Apps	Goals	Apps	Goals	Apps	Goals	Apps	Goals	Apps	Goals
Milton Keynes Dons	2017–18	League One	0	0	0	0	0	0	0	0	0	0
Milton Keynes Dons	2018–19	League Two	0	0	0	0	0	0	0	0	0	0
Milton Keynes Dons	2019–20	League One	0	0	0	0	0	0	0	0	0	0
Milton Keynes Dons	2020–21	League One	2	0	1	0	0	0	1 (Note: Appearance(s) in EFL Trophy.)	2	4	2
Milton Keynes Dons	2021–22	League One	0	0	—		0	0	2	1	2	1
Milton Keynes Dons	Total		2	0	1	0	0	0	3	3	6	3
Hitchin Town (loan)	2018–19	SL Premier Division Central	11	1	—		—		1 (Note: Appearance(s) in Hertfordshire Charity Cup)	0	12	1
Hitchin Town (loan)	2019–20	SL Premier Division Central	2	0	—		—		—		2	0
Hitchin Town (loan)	Total		13	1	—		—		1	0	14	1
Wealdstone (loan)	2021–22	National League	8	0	1	1	—		1 (Note: Appearance(s) in FA Trophy)	0	10	1
Dagenham & Redbridge	2022–23	National League	13	2	1	0	—		1	0	15	2
Arbroath	2023–24	Scottish Championship	33	6	1	0	4	2	2 (Note: Appearance(s) in Scottish Challenge Cup)	2	40	10
Exeter City	2024–25	League One	14	0	3	1	0	0	3	1	20	2
Rochdale (loan)	2024–25	National League	9	4	0	0	—		2 (Note: One appearance and one goal in FA Trophy, one appearance and one goal in National League play-offs)	2	11	6
Salford City	2025–26	League Two	8	0	0	0	1	0	2	1	11	1
Career total			100	13	7	2	5	2	15	9	127	26
