= Matt O'Riley =

Footballer (born 2000)

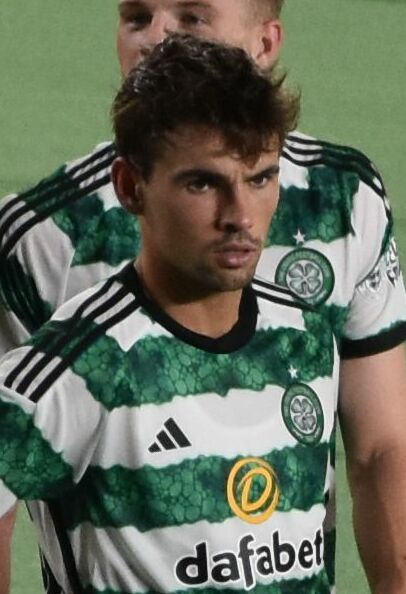
- O'Riley with Celtic in 2023

Personal information
- Full name: Matthew Sean O'Riley
- Date of birth: 21 November 2000 (age 25)
- Place of birth: Hounslow, London, England
- Height: 6 ft 2 in (1.87 m)
- Positions: Attacking midfielder; right midfielder

Team information
- Current team: Brighton & Hove Albion
- Number: 33

Youth career
- 2007–2009: NPL Youth
- 2009–2017: Fulham

Senior career*
Years	Team	Apps	(Gls)
2017–2020	Fulham	1	(0)
2021–2022	Milton Keynes Dons	49	(10)
2022–2024	Celtic	93	(25)
2024–	Brighton & Hove Albion	29	(3)
2025–2026	→ Marseille (loan)	15	(1)

International career^{‡}
2015–2016	England U16	4	(0)
2017	England U18	1	(0)
2022	Denmark U21	5	(1)
2023–	Denmark	6	(0)
- * Club domestic league appearances and goals as of 19 September 2026 ‡ National team caps and goals as of 23:47, 12 October 2025 (UTC)

Matthew Sean O'Riley (born 21 November 2000) is a professional footballer who plays as an attacking midfielder or right midfielder for Premier League club Brighton & Hove Albion. Born in England, he plays for the Denmark national team.

== Club career ==
=== Fulham ===
O'Riley joined the academy of Fulham at the age of eight, having previously played for Teddington-based NPL Youth. He progressed through several age groups, eventually becoming a regular in the club's U18 and reserve sides. He made his first team debut on 8 August 2017 in a 2–0 EFL Cup first round away win over Wycombe Wanderers.

Over the next two seasons O'Riley featured for the club's U21 side in several EFL Trophy group matches while on the fringes of the first team. He made his Championship debut on 1 January 2020 as a 19th-minute substitute in a 2–1 home defeat to Reading. O'Riley left the club in the summer of 2020, having declined a new three-year first team deal amidst rumoured interest from several clubs domestically and abroad.

=== Milton Keynes Dons ===
On 24 January 2021, O'Riley signed for League One club Milton Keynes Dons, having spent six months training with the side as a free agent since leaving Fulham. He made his debut for the club two days later on 26 January 2021, in a 1–0 home defeat to Charlton Athletic. Just a week after joining the club, O'Riley scored his first professional career goal in a 2–0 away win over AFC Wimbledon on 30 January 2021.

After an impressive start to the 2021–22 season, on 11 December 2021 he was named EFL Young Player of the Month for November 2021, a month in which he scored four goals in as many appearances.

=== Celtic ===
On 20 January 2022, O'Riley joined Scottish Premiership club Celtic on a four-and-a-half-year deal for a reported £1,500,000 fee after the club met his release clause. He made his debut on 26 January 2022, starting in a 2–1 away win over Hearts. On 9 February 2022, O'Riley scored his first goal for the club in a 3–2 away victory over Aberdeen. On 9 April 2022 he scored a brace in a 7–0 home win over St Johnstone. O'Riley would help Celtic lift the 2021–22 Scottish Premiership that year.

On 6 September 2022, O'Riley made his UEFA Champions League debut in a 3–0 home defeat against Real Madrid. In September 2023, he signed a new four-year contract with the club. On 20 October 2023, O' Riley was named Scottish Premiership Player of the Month for the month of September. In April 2024, he was named in the PFA Scottish Premiership Team of the Year for the 2023–24 campaign. A month later he was voted Player of the Year, Young Player of the Year and Players' Player of the Year for the 2023–24 season at the club's annual awards ceremony, topping off a successful season in which he went on to claim his third successive league title with Celtic.

=== Brighton & Hove Albion ===
On 26 August 2024, O'Riley joined Premier League club Brighton & Hove Albion for a fee of £25 million, signing a contract until June 2029. He made his debut the next day, starting in a EFL Cup tie against Crawley Town, but after a nasty tackle was injured nine minutes into the game and forced to come off. O'Riley subsequently underwent ankle surgery, with Brighton chairman Tony Bloom confirming that it was hoped he would return to full fitness "at some point in the latter part of the year." On 9 November 2024, O'Riley scored his first goal for Brighton on his Premier League debut in a 2–1 league win over defending champions Manchester City. His first season was a frustrating one, failing to complete 90 minutes once.

==== Loan to Marseille ====
On 2 September 2025, Ligue 1 side Marseille announced the season-long loan signing of O'Riley. He made his debut against Lorient in a 4–0 victory, coming off the bench. He scored his first goal against Metz.

On 2 February 2026, the loan was terminated, and the player returned to Brighton.

== International career ==
O'Riley was an England youth international. Apart from England, he is eligible to represent Denmark due to his maternal family. In February 2022, O'Riley declared his interest in representing Denmark internationally when he stated that: "I played for England youth teams but at the same time, I do feel quite Danish. My mum is Danish and I can speak a decent amount and I can understand a very good amount. In that sense, I don't think it is out of the question at all. If I did get a call up from Denmark, I don't think I'd be saying no".

In March 2022, O'Riley was called up to the Denmark under-21 for the first time. On 14 June 2022, O'Riley scored his first goal against Turkey in a 2023 UEFA European Under-21 Championship qualification which Denmark won 3–2.

On 20 November 2023, O'Riley made his senior debut for Denmark, starting in a UEFA Euro 2024 qualifying match against Northern Ireland. Despite his fantastic form for Celtic, he was controversially left out of the 26-man squad for the finals in Germany. Denmark manager Kasper Hjulmand said: "Matt has been a really good player, he's had a great season. He played well and I understand the question. I have chosen six other midfielders but it was tight. I have chosen six players that we can move around a bit. Mikkel Damsgaard and Andreas Christensen can also cover positions in the midfield. It has gone beyond Matt, but it was a difficult choice. I know he will play a lot of international matches. He couldn't have done anything differently [to earn a place in the squad]. He could hardly do better than what he did this season."

== Career statistics ==
=== Club ===
As of match played 5 November 2026

Appearances and goals by club, season and competition
Club	Season	League			National cup (Note: Includes FA Cup, Scottish Cup, Coupe de France)		League cup (Note: Includes EFL Cup, Scottish League Cup)		Europe		Other		Total	
Club	Season	Division	Apps	Goals	Apps	Goals	Apps	Goals	Apps	Goals	Apps	Goals	Apps	Goals
Fulham U21	2017–18	—			—		—		—		3 (Note: Appearance(s) in EFL Trophy)	0	3	0
Fulham U21	2018–19	—			—		—		—		1	0	1	0
Fulham U21	2019–20	—			—		—		—		2	0	2	0
Fulham U21	Total		—		—		—		—		6	0	6	0
Fulham	2017–18	Championship	0	0	0	0	2	0	—		0	0	2	0
Fulham	2018–19	Premier League	0	0	0	0	1	0	—		—		1	0
Fulham	2019–20	Championship	1	0	0	0	1	0	—		0	0	2	0
Fulham	Total		1	0	0	0	4	0	—		0	0	5	0
Milton Keynes Dons	2020–21	League One	23	3	—		—		—		1	0	24	3
Milton Keynes Dons	2021–22	League One	26	7	1	0	1	0	—		2	0	30	7
Milton Keynes Dons	Total		49	10	1	0	1	0	—		3	0	54	10
Celtic	2021–22	Scottish Premiership	16	4	2	0	—		2 (Note: Appearances in UEFA (Europa) Conference League)	0	—		20	4
Celtic	2022–23	Scottish Premiership	38	3	5	1	3	0	6 (Note: Appearances in UEFA Champions League)	0	—		52	4
Celtic	2023–24	Scottish Premiership	37	18	5	1	1	0	6	0	—		49	19
Celtic	2024–25	Scottish Premiership	2	0	—		1	0	—		—		3	0
Celtic	Total		93	25	12	2	5	0	14	0	—		124	27
Brighton & Hove Albion	2024–25	Premier League	21	2	1	0	1	0	—		—		23	2
Brighton & Hove Albion	2025–26	Premier League	6	1	0	0	0	0	—		—		6	1
Brighton & Hove Albion	2026–27	Premier League	2	0	0	0	2	0	4	1	—		8	1
Brighton & Hove Albion	Total		29	3	1	0	3	0	4	1	—		37	4
Marseille (loan)	2025–26	Ligue 1	15	1	2	0	—		7	0	1 (Note: Appearance in Trophée des Champions)	0	25	1
Career total			187	39	16	2	13	0	25	1	10	0	251	42

=== International ===
As of match played 12 October 2025

Appearances and goals by national team and year
National team	Year	Apps	Goals
Denmark	2023	1	0
Denmark	2024	1	0
Denmark	2025	4	0
Total		6	0

== Honours ==
Celtic

- Scottish Premiership: 2021–22, 2022–23, 2023–24
- Scottish Cup: 2022–23, 2023–24
- Scottish League Cup: 2022–23

Individual

- EFL Young Player of the Month: November 2021
- Scottish Premiership Goal of the Month: April 2022
- Scottish Premiership Player of the Month: September 2023
- PFA Scottish Premiership Team of the Year: 2023–24
- Celtic Player of the Year: 2023–24
- Celtic Players' Player of the Year: 2023–24
- Celtic Young Player of the Year: 2022–23, 2023–24
