= Lewis Johnson (footballer) =

English footballer

Personal information
- Full name: Lewis Martin Benjamin Johnson
- Date of birth: 9 January 2004 (age 22)
- Place of birth: England
- Position: Winger

Team information
- Current team: Hofstra University

Youth career
- 2017–2019: Aston Villa
- 2019–2023: Milton Keynes Dons

Senior career*
Years	Team	Apps	(Gls)
2020–2023	Milton Keynes Dons	16	(0)
2021–2022	→ Banbury United (loan)	12	(5)
2022	→ AFC Rushden & Diamonds (loan)	8	(0)
2022	→ Concord Rangers (loan)	10	(3)
2023–2024	Berkhamsted F.C.	12	(7)
2024	University of Kentucky	10	(1)
2024	→ Asheville City SC (loan)	14	(7)
2025	Lexington Sporting Club	9	(5)
2025	Gardner Webb	17	(1)
2026–	Hofstra University	0	(0)
- * Club domestic league appearances and goals as of 19:58, 1 May 2023 (UTC)

Lewis Martin Benjamin Johnson (born 9 January 2004) is an English footballer who plays as a winger for the Hofstra Pride men’s soccer team.

== Club career ==
=== Milton Keynes Dons ===
Johnson joined the academy of Milton Keynes Dons in 2019, having previously played for Aston Villa's academy since the age of 13. On 11 November 2020 he made his senior first team debut, starting in a 1–2 EFL Trophy group stage defeat at home to Southampton U21.

On 26 December 2020 he made his league debut, coming on as a 69th-minute substitute for Cameron Jerome in a 2–0 home win against Bristol Rovers. Following several first team appearances, on 16 February 2021 the club announced Johnson had signed his first professional deal. At the end of his breakthrough season, Johnson was named the LFE League One Apprentice of the Season for 2021. He spent the majority of the following 2021–22 season out on loan to Southern Premier Central clubs Banbury United and AFC Rushden & Diamonds.

On 7 August 2022, Johnson joined was again sent out on loan, this time to National League South club Concord Rangers, However following the conclusion of the 2022–23 season, Johnson was one of nine players who departed Milton Keynes Dons following their relegation to League Two.

Johnson joined Berkhamsted FC at the start of the 2023–24 season, where he would score 7 goals in 12 appearances.

In January 2024 he left Berkhamsted FC to join the University of Kentucky Wildcats for their spring season. After the short spring season finished, he went on loan to USL2 South Central Division side Asheville City SC in North Carolina. During this season Asheville became South Central Conference Champions and Southern Conference Champions. They lost out on a place in the USL2 final with a 1–0 loss to Seacoast Phantoms. Asheville City SC finished the season with 13 wins, 2 draws and 1 loss.

== Career statistics ==
As of 7 June 2024

Appearances and goals by club, season and competition
Club	Season	League			FA Cup		League Cup		Other		Total	
Club	Season	Division	Apps	Goals	Apps	Goals	Apps	Goals	Apps	Goals	Apps	Goals
Milton Keynes Dons	2020–21	League One	6	0	1	0	—		5 (Note: Appearance(s) in EFL Trophy)	0	12	0
Milton Keynes Dons	2021–22	League One	0	0	0	0	0	0	1 (Note: Appearance(s) in EFL Trophy)	0	1	0
Milton Keynes Dons	2022–23	League One	3	0	0	0	0	0	0	0	3	0
Milton Keynes Dons	Total		9	0	1	0	0	0	6	0	16	0
Banbury United (loan)	2021–22	Southern Premier Central	10	3	—		—		2 (Note: Appearance(s) in Southern Football League Cup)	2	12	5
AFC Rushden & Diamonds (loan)	2021–22	Southern Premier Central	7	0	—		—		1 (Note: Appearance(s) in Northamptonshire Senior Cup)	0	8	0
Concord Rangers (loan)	2022–23	National League South	9	3	1	0	—		0	0	10	3
Berkhamsted FC	2023–24	Southern Premier Central	10	6	2	1	—		0	0	12	7
University of Kentucky	2024	Sun Belt Conference	10	1	—		—		0	0	10	1
Asheville City SC (loan)	2024	USL2 South Central Division	14	7	—		—		0	0	14	7
Lexington Sporting Club	2025	USL2	9	5							9	5
Gardner Webb	2025	Big South Conference	17	1							17	1
Career total			95	26	4	1	0	0	8	2	108	29

== Honours ==
Banbury United

- Southern League Premier Division Central: 2021–22

Individual

- LFE League One Apprentice of the Season: 2021
- Milton Keynes Dons Academy Player of the Year: 2020–21
