= 2021–22 Milton Keynes Dons F.C. season =

Milton Keynes Dons
2021–22 season
- Chairman: Pete Winkelman
- Head Coach: Russell Martin (until 31 July); Dean Lewington (interim) (from 3 August until 13 August); Liam Manning (from 13 August)
- Stadium: Stadium MK
- League One: 3rd (qualified for play-offs)
- FA Cup: First round (eliminated by Stevenage)
- EFL Cup: First round (eliminated by Bournemouth)
- EFL Trophy: Round of 16 (eliminated by Charlton Athletic)
- Top goalscorer: League: Scott Twine (20); All: Scott Twine (20)
- Highest home attendance: 15,311 (vs Ipswich Town); 12 February 2022, League One
- Lowest home attendance: 1,320 (vs Wycombe Wanderers); 5 October 2021, EFL Trophy GS
- Average home league attendance: 9,314
- Biggest win: 5–0 vs Plymouth Argyle; 30 April 2022, League One
- Biggest defeat: 0–5 vs Bournemouth, 31 July 2021, EFL Cup R1
Home colours	Away colours	Third colours

The 2021–22 season was Milton Keynes Dons' 18th season in their existence, and the club's third consecutive season in League One. The club also competed in the FA Cup, EFL Cup and EFL Trophy.

The season covers the period from 1 July 2021 to 30 June 2022.

== Managerial change ==
On 1 August 2021, manager Russell Martin departed the club to take up the vacant managerial position at Swansea City, with the buyout clause in his contract activated. On 3 August 2021, the club announced captain Dean Lewington would take over as interim manager whilst a permanent replacement was sought.

A successor was announced on 13 August 2021, with Liam Manning being revealed as the club's first ever Head Coach.

== Pre-season friendlies ==
Milton Keynes Dons announced they will play friendly matches against King's Lynn Town, Chelmsford City, Bristol City and Tottenham Hotspur as part of their pre-season preparations.

Win	Draw	Loss	Postponed

Matches

Date	Opponent	Venue	Result	Scorers	Attendance	Ref
13 July 2021 – 19:00	King's Lynn Town	Away	3–1	Twine (2), Watters		(Note: 2 x 60 minute matches.)
17 July 2021 – 11:00	Maidenhead United	Away	3–1	Trialist (2), Bird		(Note: Behind closed doors. 2 x 60 minute matches.)
19 July 2021 – 20:00	Chelmsford City	Away	P–P			(Note: Milton Keynes Dons XI side.)
21 July 2021 – 11:00	Coventry City	Neutral	7–1	Bird, Watters (2), Twine, O'Riley (2), Darling		(Note: Behind closed doors. 2 x 60 minute matches.)
24 July 2021 – 13:30	Bristol City	Away	1–3	Bird		
28 July 2021 – 19:45	Tottenham Hotspur	Home	1–3	Freeman	15,795	

== Competitions ==
=== League One ===
League table

Pos	Team	Pld	W	D	L	GF	GA	GD	Pts	Promotion, qualification or relegation
1	Wigan Athletic (C, P)	46	27	11	8	82	44	+38	92	Promotion to EFL Championship
2	Rotherham United (P)	46	27	9	10	70	33	+37	90	Promotion to EFL Championship
3	Milton Keynes Dons	46	26	11	9	78	44	+34	89	Qualification for League One play-offs
4	Sheffield Wednesday	46	24	13	9	78	50	+28	85	Qualification for League One play-offs
5	Sunderland (O, P)	46	24	12	10	79	53	+26	84	Qualification for League One play-offs
6	Wycombe Wanderers	46	23	14	9	75	51	+24	83	Qualification for League One play-offs
7	Plymouth Argyle	46	23	11	12	68	48	+20	80	
8	Oxford United	46	22	10	14	82	59	+23	76	

Source: EFL Official Website
Rules for classification: 1) Points; 2) Goal difference; 3) Number of goals scored; 4) Head-to-head results; 5) Wins; 6) Away goals; 7) Penalty points based on yellow and red cards received excluding the last four games of the season (sec 9.5); 8) 12-point sending off offences; 9) If the tie affects the automatic promotion or relegation places, a play-off game or games would be held between the two tied teams
(C) Champions; (O) Play-off winners; (P) Promoted

Results summary

Overall								Home						Away					
Pld	W	D	L	GF	GA	GD	Pts	W	D	L	GF	GA	GD	W	D	L	GF	GA	GD
46	26	11	9	78	44	+34	89	13	5	5	34	21	+13	13	6	4	44	23	+21

Last updated: 30 April 2022.
Source: BBC

Results by matchday

Matchday	1	2	3	4	5	6	7	8	9	10	11	12	13	14	15	16	17	18	19	20	21	22	23	24	25	26	27	28	29	30	31	32	33	34	35	36	37	38	39	40	41	42	43	44	45	46
Ground	A	H	H	A	H	A	H	A	H	H	A	A	A	H	A	H	H	A	A	H	H	A	H	A	H	A	H	A	A	H	A	H	A	A	H	A	H	H	A	H	H	A	H	A	H	A
Result	D	L	W	D	W	D	W	W	W	D	L	L	W	L	W	W	W	L	W	D	L	W	D	D	W	W	L	W	W	W	D	D	W	W	W	W	W	D	W	W	W	D	L	L	W	W
Position	8	15	12	13	11	10	5	3	3	3	6	6	6	7	7	5	5	8	6	7	9	7	7	7	5	5	5	5	4	3	3	3	3	3	3	3	3	3	3	3	2	2	3	3	3	3

Updated to match(es) played on 30 April 2022. Source: 11v11 for league tables and fixtures
A = Away; H = Home; W = Win; D = Draw; L = Loss

Matches

Win	Draw	Loss

Date	Opponent	Venue	Result	Scorers	Attendance	Ref
7 August 2021 – 15:00	Bolton Wanderers	Away	3–3	Eisa, Twine, Boateng	16,087	
14 August 2021 – 15:00	Sunderland	Home	1–2	Parrott	9,830	
17 August 2021 – 19:45	Charlton Athletic	Home	2–1	Parrott, Eisa	7,939	
21 August 2021 – 15:00	Ipswich Town	Away	2–2	Twine, O'Riley	18,622	
28 August 2021 – 15:00	Accrington Stanley	Home	2–0	Eisa, O'Riley	6,816	
4 September 2021 – 15:00	Cheltenham Town	Away	1–1	Boateng	3,704	
11 September 2021 – 15:00	Portsmouth	Home	1–0	Robson	10,822	
18 September 2021 – 15:00	Gillingham	Away	4–1	Twine, Kioso, Ehmer (o.g.), Watters	4,119	
25 September 2021 – 15:00	Wycombe Wanderers	Home	1–0	Parrott	9,355	
28 September 2021 – 19:45	Fleetwood Town	Home	3–3	Twine (3)	6,564	
2 October 2021 – 15:00	Doncaster Rovers	Away	1–2	Kioso	5,927	
16 October 2021 – 15:00	Shrewsbury Town	Away	0–1		5,711	
19 October 2021 – 19:45	Wigan Athletic	Away	2–1	Kioso, Darikwa (o.g.)	8,351	
23 October 2021 – 15:00	Rotherham United	Home	0–3		8,448	
30 October 2021 – 15:00	Crewe Alexandra	Away	4–1	Eisa, O'Riley, Kioso, Watters	4,512	
13 November 2021 – 15:00	Cambridge United	Home	4–1	Twine (2), Watters (2)	9,904	
20 November 2021 – 15:00	Burton Albion	Home	1–0	Watters	9,770	
23 November 2021 – 19:45	Sheffield Wednesday	Away	1–2	Twine	18,581	
27 November 2021 – 15:00	Morecambe	Away	4–0	Eisa, O'Riley (2), Darling	3,700	
8 December 2021 – 19:45	Plymouth Argyle	Home	1–1	Watson	7,566	
11 December 2021 – 15:00	Oxford United	Home	1–2	Boateng	9,914	
26 December 2021 – 15:00	Lincoln City	Away	3–2	Twine (2), O'Riley	8,328	
1 January 2022 – 15:00	Gillingham	Home	0–0		7,891	
8 January 2022 – 15:00	Accrington Stanley	Away	1–1	Eisa	1,880	
11 January 2022 – 19:45	AFC Wimbledon	Home	1–0	O'Riley	7,663	
15 January 2022 – 15:00	Portsmouth	Away	2–1	Eisa, Corbeanu	14,958	
22 January 2022 – 15:00	Doncaster Rovers	Home	0–1		7,229	
25 January 2022 – 19:45	Burton Albion	Away	1–0	Twine	2,171	
29 January 2022 – 15:00	Wycombe Wanderers	Away	1–0	Twine	7,345	
5 February 2022 – 15:00	Lincoln City	Home	2–1	Darling, O'Hora	8,723	
8 February 2022 – 19:45	Fleetwood Town	Away	1–1	Darling	3,227	
12 February 2022 – 15:00	Ipswich Town	Home	0–0		15,311	
19 February 2022 – 15:00	Sunderland	Away	2–1	Eisa, Wickham	30,451	
22 February 2022 – 19:45	Charlton Athletic	Away	2–0	Watson, Kesler Hayden	8,807	
26 February 2022 – 15:00	Bolton Wanderers	Home	2–0	Eisa, Twine	10,388	
5 March 2022 – 15:00	Rotherham United	Away	2–1	Darling, Eisa	9,731	
8 March 2022 – 19:45	Cheltenham Town	Home	3–1	Parrott (2), Eisa	6,894	
12 March 2022 – 15:00	Wigan Athletic	Home	1–1	Darling	11,193	
19 March 2022 – 15:00	Cambridge United	Away	1–0	O'Hora	6,325	
2 April 2022 – 15:00	Shrewsbury Town	Home	2–0	Eisa, Twine	8,984	
5 April 2022 – 19:45	Crewe Alexandra	Home	2–1	Parrott, Coventry	7,315	
9 April 2022 – 15:00	AFC Wimbledon	Away	1–1	Parrott	7,841	
16 April 2022 – 19:45	Sheffield Wednesday	Home	2–3	Parrott, Twine	14,252	
19 April 2022 – 19:45	Oxford United	Away	0–1		9,685	
23 April 2022 – 15:00	Morecambe	Home	2–0	Darling, Harvie	10,101	
30 April 2022 – 12:30	Plymouth Argyle	Away	5–0	Twine (4), Darling	15,644	

=== Play-offs ===
Matches

Win	Draw	Loss

Date	Round	Opponent	Venue	Result	Scorers	Attendance	Ref
5 May 2022 – 19:45	Semi-final 1st leg	Wycombe Wanderers	Away	0–2		8,987	
8 May 2022 – 18:30	Semi-final 2nd leg	Wycombe Wanderers	Home	1–0	Parrott	13,012	

=== FA Cup ===
Matches

Win	Draw	Loss

Date	Round	Opponent	Venue	Result	Scorers	Attendance	Ref
6 November 2021 – 15:00	First round	Stevenage	Home	2–2	Darling, Watters	2,860	
16 November 2021 – 19:45	First round (replay)	Stevenage	Away	1–2 (a.e.t.)	Darling	1,876	

=== EFL Cup ===
Matches

Win	Draw	Loss

Date	Round	Opponent	Venue	Result	Scorers	Attendance	Ref
31 July 2021 – 15:00	First round	Bournemouth	Away	0–5		5,746	

=== EFL Trophy ===
Southern Group C table

Pos	Div	Team	Pld	W	PW	PL	L	GF	GA	GD	Pts	Qualification
1	ACA	Aston Villa U21	3	3	0	0	0	11	5	+6	9	Advance to Round 2
2	L1	Milton Keynes Dons	3	2	0	0	1	6	6	0	6	Advance to Round 2
3	L1	Burton Albion	3	1	0	0	2	8	6	+2	3	
4	L1	Wycombe Wanderers	3	0	0	0	3	2	10	−8	0	

Source: EFL.com

Matches

Win	Draw	Loss

Date	Round	Opponent	Venue	Result	Scorers	Attendance	Ref
31 August 2021 – 19:00	Group game 1	Burton Albion	Away	2–1	Bird, Darling	690	
5 October 2021 – 19:00	Group game 2	Wycombe Wanderers	Home	2–1	Boateng, Jules	1,320	
26 October 2021 – 19:00	Group game 3	Aston Villa U21	Home	2–4	Parrott, Watters	2,683	
30 November 2021 – 19:00	Second round	Leyton Orient	Away	0–0 (5–4 p)		990	
4 January 2022 – 19:00	Round of 16	Charlton Athletic	Away	0–1		1,653	

== Player details ==
Note: Players' ages as of the club's final match of the 2021–22 season.

#	Name	Nationality	Position	Date of birth (age)	Signed from	Signed in	Transfer fee
Goalkeepers
1	Jamie Cumming	(England)	GK	4 September 1999 (aged 22)	(England) Chelsea	2022	Loan
23	Franco Ravizzoli	(Argentina)	GK	9 July 1997 (aged 24)	(England) Eastbourne Borough	2021	Free
33	Ronnie Sandford	(England)	GK	24 February 2005 (aged 17)	Academy	2021	Trainee
Defenders
2	Tennai Watson	(England)	RWB	4 March 1997 (aged 25)	Free agent	2021	Free
3	Dean Lewington	(England)	CB	18 May 1984 (aged 37)	(England) Wimbledon	2004	Free
5	Warren O'Hora	(Republic of Ireland)	CB	19 April 1999 (aged 23)	(England) Brighton & Hove Albion	2021	Undisclosed
6	Harry Darling	(England)	CB	8 August 1999 (aged 22)	(England) Cambridge United	2021	Undisclosed
15	Aden Baldwin	(England)	CB	10 June 1997 (aged 24)	Free agent	2021	Free
21	Daniel Harvie	(Scotland)	LWB	14 July 1998 (aged 23)	(Scotland) Ayr United	2020	Undisclosed
26	Jack Davies	(England)	CB	3 December 2002 (aged 19)	Academy	2020	Trainee
29	Kaine Kesler Hayden	(England)	RWB	23 October 2002 (aged 19)	(England) Aston Villa	2022	Loan
31	Brandon Mason	(England)	LWB	30 September 1997 (aged 24)	Free agent	2022	Free
Midfielders
7	Matt Smith	(Wales)	CM	22 November 1999 (aged 22)	(England) Manchester City	2022	Undisclosed
8	David Kasumu	(Nigeria)	CM	5 October 1999 (aged 22)	Academy	2017	Trainee
9	Scott Twine	(England)	AM	14 July 1999 (aged 22)	(England) Swindon Town	2021	Compensation
14	Conor Coventry	(Republic of Ireland)	CM	25 March 2000 (aged 22)	(England) West Ham United	2022	Loan
16	Josh McEachran	(England)	CM	1 March 1993 (aged 29)	Free agent	2021	Free
17	Dan Kemp	(England)	AM	11 January 1999 (aged 23)	(England) Leyton Orient	2022	Undisclosed
18	Hiram Boateng	(England)	CM	8 January 1996 (aged 26)	(England) Exeter City	2019	Compensation
22	John Freeman	(England)	CM	4 November 2001 (aged 20)	Academy	2019	Trainee
Forwards
10	Mo Eisa	(Sudan)	CF	12 July 1994 (aged 27)	(England) Peterborough United	2021	Undisclosed
11	Theo Corbeanu	(Canada)	RW	17 May 2002 (aged 19)	(England) Wolverhampton Wanderers	2022	Loan
19	Connor Wickham	(England)	CF	31 March 1993 (aged 29)	Free agent	2022	Free
20	Troy Parrott	(Republic of Ireland)	CF	4 February 2002 (aged 20)	(England) Tottenham Hotspur	2021	Loan
24	Jay Bird	(England)	CF	6 May 2001 (aged 21)	Academy	2019	Trainee
Out on loan
4	Zak Jules	(Scotland)	CB	2 July 1997 (aged 24)	(England) Walsall	2021	Undisclosed
25	Brooklyn Ilunga	(England)	LWB	21 November 2003 (aged 18)	Academy	2021	Trainee
27	Lewis Johnson	(England)	LW	9 November 2004 (aged 17)	Academy	2020	Trainee
Left club during season
1	Andy Fisher	(England)	GK	12 February 1998 (aged 24)	(England) Blackburn Rovers	2020	Undisclosed
7	Matt O'Riley	(Denmark)	AM	21 November 2000 (aged 21)	Free agent	2021	Free
11	Charlie Brown	(England)	CF	23 September 1999 (aged 22)	(England) Chelsea	2021	Undisclosed
12	Laurie Walker	(England)	GK	14 October 1989 (aged 32)	Free agent	2021	Free
14	Josh Martin	(England)	LW	9 September 2001 (aged 20)	(England) Norwich City	2021	Loan
17	Ethan Robson	(England)	CM	25 October 1996 (aged 25)	(England) Blackpool	2021	Loan
31	Peter Kioso	(Republic of Ireland)	RWB	15 August 1999 (aged 22)	(England) Luton Town	2021	Loan
36	Max Watters	(England)	CF	23 March 1999 (aged 23)	(Wales) Cardiff City	2021	Loan

== Transfers ==
=== Transfers in ===
Date from	Position	Name	From	Fee	Ref.
1 July 2021	GK	(Argentina) Franco Ravizzoli	Eastbourne Borough	Free transfer	
1 July 2021	AM	(England) Scott Twine	Swindon Town	Compensation	
13 July 2021	CB	(England) Aden Baldwin	Bristol City	Free transfer	
20 July 2021	CF	(Sudan) Mo Eisa	Peterborough United	Undisclosed	
28 July 2021	RWB	(England) Tennai Watson	Free agent	Free transfer	
21 January 2022	CF	(England) Connor Wickham	Free agent	Free transfer	
31 January 2022	DM	(Wales) Matt Smith	Manchester City	Undisclosed	
31 January 2022	AM	(England) Dan Kemp	Leyton Orient	Undisclosed	
18 March 2022	LWB	(England) Brandon Mason	Free agent	Free transfer	

=== Loans in ===
Start date	Position	Name	From	End date	Ref.
1 July 2021	LW	(England) Josh Martin	Norwich City	17 January 2022 (Note: Originally until the end of the season. Recalled early by Norwich City.)	
1 July 2021	CM	(England) Ethan Robson	Blackpool	17 January 2022 (Note: Originally until the end of the season. Recalled early by Blackpool.)	
8 July 2021	CF	(England) Max Watters	Cardiff City	30 December 2021 (Note: Originally until the end of the season. Recalled early by Cardiff City.)	
29 July 2021	CF	(Republic of Ireland) Troy Parrott	Tottenham Hotspur	End of season	
31 August 2021	RWB	(Republic of Ireland) Peter Kioso	Luton Town	18 January 2022 (Note: Originally until the end of the season. Recalled early by Luton Town.)	
6 January 2022	RW	(Canada) Theo Corbeanu	Wolverhampton Wanderers	End of season	
13 January 2022	GK	(England) Jamie Cumming	Chelsea	End of season	
18 January 2022	DM	(Republic of Ireland) Conor Coventry	West Ham United	End of season	
31 January 2022	RWB	(England) Kaine Kesler Hayden	Aston Villa	End of season	

=== Loans out ===
Start date	Position	Name	To	End date	Ref.
12 August 2021	DF	(England) Jack Davies	Oxford City	21 January 2022 (Note: Originally until end of the season. Recalled early on 21 January 2022.)	
17 August 2021	GK	(England) Laurie Walker	Oldham Athletic	24 August 2021	
29 September 2021	CF	(England) Jay Bird	Wealdstone	January 2022	
29 October 2021	GK	(England) Laurie Walker	Aldershot Town	January 2022	
26 November 2021	FW	(England) Lewis Johnson	Banbury United	25 February 2022 (Note: Originally until end of the season. Recalled early on 25 February 2022.)	
7 January 2022	MF	(England) John Freeman	Chelmsford City	January 2022	
15 January 2022	CB	(Scotland) Zak Jules	Fleetwood Town	End of season	
22 February 2022	FW	(England) Brooklyn Ilunga	Royston Town	End of season	
23 March 2022	FW	(England) Lewis Johnson	AFC Rushden & Diamonds	End of season	

=== Transfers out ===
Date from	Position	Name	To	Fee	Ref.
30 June 2021	CF	(England) Kieran Agard	Plymouth Argyle	Released	
30 June 2021	DM	(England) Jordan Houghton	Plymouth Argyle	Released	
30 June 2021	CF	(England) Cameron Jerome	Luton Town	Free transfer	
30 June 2021	CF	(Republic of Ireland) Joe Mason	(Canada) Cavalry	Released	
30 June 2021	GK	(England) Lee Nicholls	Huddersfield Town	Released	
30 June 2021	LB	(England) Matthew Sorinola	(Belgium) Royale Union Saint-Gilloise	Compensation	
30 June 2021	CM	(England) Andrew Surman	Retired		
5 July 2021	CF	(England) Sam Nombe	Exeter City	Undisclosed	
14 July 2021	AM	(Scotland) Scott Fraser	Ipswich Town	Undisclosed	
26 July 2021	CM	(England) Ben Gladwin	Swindon Town	Free transfer	
6 January 2022	CF	(England) Charlie Brown	Cheltenham Town	Undisclosed	
6 January 2022	GK	(England) Laurie Walker	Stevenage	Undisclosed	
11 January 2022	GK	(England) Andy Fisher	(Wales) Swansea City	£400,000	
20 January 2022	AM	(Denmark) Matt O'Riley	(Scotland) Celtic	£1,500,000	

== Awards ==
- EFL League One Manager of the Month (September): Liam Manning
- EFL Young Player of the Month (October): Matt O'Riley
- EFL League One Player of the Month (November): Scott Twine
- EFL League One Manager of the Month (January): Liam Manning
- EFL League One Team of the Season: Harry Darling, Scott Twine
- EFL League One Player of the Season: Scott Twine
- PFA Team of the Year: Harry Darling, Scott Twine
