= 2020–21 Milton Keynes Dons F.C. season =

Milton Keynes Dons
2020–21 season
- Chairman: Pete Winkelman
- Manager: Russell Martin
- Stadium: Stadium MK
- League One: 13th
- FA Cup: Third round
- EFL Cup: First round
- EFL Trophy: Quarter-finals
- Top goalscorer: League: Scott Fraser (14); All: Cameron Jerome (15)
- Biggest win: 6–0 (vs Norwich City U21); 8 December 2020, EFL Trophy R32
- Biggest defeat: 4–0 (vs Lincoln City); 13 April 2021, League One
Home colours	Away colours	Third colours

The 2020–21 season was Milton Keynes Dons' 17th season in their existence, and the club's second consecutive season in League One. The club also competed in the FA Cup, EFL Cup and EFL Trophy.

Due to the impact of the COVID-19 pandemic, league fixtures commenced on 12 September 2020, approximately a month later than previous seasons.

The season covers the period from 1 July 2020 to 30 June 2021.

== Competitions ==
=== League One ===
==== League table ====
Pos	Team	Pld	W	D	L	GF	GA	GD	Pts
9	Ipswich Town	46	19	12	15	46	46	0	69
10	Gillingham	46	19	10	17	63	60	+3	67
11	Accrington Stanley	46	18	13	15	63	68	−5	67
12	Crewe Alexandra	46	18	12	16	56	61	−5	66
13	Milton Keynes Dons	46	18	11	17	64	62	+2	65
14	Doncaster Rovers	46	19	7	20	63	67	−4	64
15	Fleetwood Town	46	16	12	18	49	46	+3	60
16	Burton Albion	46	15	12	19	61	73	−12	57
17	Shrewsbury Town	46	13	15	18	50	57	−7	54

Source: EFL Official Website
Rules for classification: 1) Points; 2) Goal difference; 3) Number of goals scored; 4) Head-to-head results; 5) Wins; 6) Away goals; 7) Penalty points (sec 9.5); 8) 12-point sending off offences

==== Results summary ====
Overall								Home						Away					
Pld	W	D	L	GF	GA	GD	Pts	W	D	L	GF	GA	GD	W	D	L	GF	GA	GD
46	18	11	17	64	62	+2	65	10	7	6	36	28	+8	8	4	11	28	34	−6

Last updated: 9 May 2021.
Source: BBC

==== Results by matchday ====
Matchday	1	2	3	4	5	6	7	8	9	10	11	12	13	14	15	16	17	18	19	20	21	22	23	24	25	26	27	28	29	30	31	32	33	34	35	36	37	38	39	40	41	42	43	44	45	46
Ground	A	H	A	H	A	H	A	A	H	H	A	A	H	H	A	A	H	H	A	H	A	A	H	H	A	H	A	A	H	A	H	A	A	H	H	H	A	H	H	A	A	H	A	H	A	H
Result	D	L	L	D	L	W	L	L	W	D	D	W	L	D	W	L	D	D	L	W	W	L	W	L	W	D	W	W	W	L	D	L	L	L	W	W	W	W	L	D	L	W	W	W	D	L
Position	12	18	22	24	24	19	22	23	17	19	19	14	17	17	17	17	17	15	17	16	14	16	15	16	16	16	13	13	11	13	14	15	16	16	15	14	13	12	13	14	14	12	10	9	9	13

Updated to match(es) played on 9 May 2021. Source: 11v11 for league tables and fixtures
A = Away; H = Home; W = Win; D = Draw; L = Loss

==== Matches ====
Win	Draw	Loss

Date	Opponent	Venue	Result	Scorers	Attendance	Ref
12 September 2020 – 15:00	Doncaster Rovers	Away	1–1	Cargill	0	
19 September 2020 – 15:00	Lincoln City	Home	1–2	Mason	0	
26 September 2020 – 15:00	Crewe Alexandra	Away	0–2		0	
3 October 2020 – 15:00	Ipswich Town	Home	1–1	Harvie	0	
10 October 2020 – 15:00	Portsmouth	Away	1–2	Fraser	0	
17 October 2020 – 13:00	Gillingham	Home	2–0	Jerome, Morris	0	
20 October 2020 – 19:00	Oxford United	Away	2–3	Jerome, Gladwin	0	
24 October 2020 – 15:00	Blackpool	Away	0–1		0	
27 October 2020 – 19:00	Wigan Athletic	Home	2–0	Fraser, S. Walker	0	
31 October 2020 – 15:00	AFC Wimbledon	Home	1–1	Fraser	0	
3 November 2020 – 19:45	Northampton Town	Away	0–0		0	
14 November 2020 – 15:00	Sunderland	Away	2–1	Jerome, Fraser	0	
21 November 2020 – 15:00	Hull City	Home	1–3	S. Walker	0	
24 November 2020 – 19:00	Shrewsbury Town	Home	2–2	Morris, Jerome	0	
2 December 2020 – 19:45	Charlton Athletic	Away	1–0	Fraser	2,000	
5 December 2020 – 15:00	Accrington Stanley	Away	1–2	Morris	0	
12 December 2020 – 15:00	Burton Albion	Home	1–1	Fraser	2,000	
15 December 2020 – 19:45	Peterborough United	Home	1–1	Jerome	2,000	
19 December 2020 – 15:00	Plymouth Argyle	Away	0–1		2,000	
26 December 2020 – 15:00	Bristol Rovers	Home	2–0	Gladwin, Fraser	0	
29 December 2020 – 19:00	Swindon Town	Away	4–1	Jerome (2), Harvie, Poole	0	
16 January 2021 – 15:00	Peterborough United	Away	0–3		0	
19 January 2021 – 19:00	Fleetwood Town	Home	3–1	Mason (3)	0	
26 January 2021 – 19:00	Charlton Athletic	Home	0–1		0	
30 January 2021 – 15:00	AFC Wimbledon	Away	2–0	O'Riley, Sorinola	0	
6 February 2021 – 15:00	Sunderland	Home	2–2	Mason, Jerome	0	
9 February 2021 – 19:00	Rochdale	Away	4–1	O'Riley, Jules, Fraser, Jerome	0	
13 February 2021 – 15:00	Hull City	Away	1–0	Fraser	0	
20 February 2021 – 15:00	Northampton Town	Home	4–3	Surman, Grigg, Jerome, Brown	0	
23 February 2021 – 19:00	Shrewsbury Town	Away	2–4	Grigg, Brown	0	
27 February 2021 – 15:00	Oxford United	Home	1–1	Surman	0	
2 March 2021 – 18:00	Gillingham	Away	2–3	Grigg, O'Hora	0	
6 March 2021 – 15:00	Wigan Athletic	Away	0–3		0	
9 March 2021 – 19:00	Blackpool	Home	0–1		0	
13 March 2021 – 15:00	Accrington Stanley	Home	3–2	Jerome (2), O'Riley	0	
16 March 2021 – 19:00	Plymouth Argyle	Home	2–1	Jerome, Fraser	0	
20 March 2021 – 15:00	Burton Albion	Away	2–1	Fraser, O'Hora	0	
27 March 2021 – 15:00	Doncaster Rovers	Home	1–0	Harvie	0	
5 April 2021 – 15:00	Crewe Alexandra	Home	0–2		0	
10 April 2021 – 15:00	Ipswich Town	Away	0–0		0	
13 April 2021 – 19:00	Lincoln City	Away	0–4		0	
17 April 2021 – 12:30	Portsmouth	Home	1–0	Fraser	0	
20 April 2021 – 19:00	Bristol Rovers	Away	2–0	Fraser, Grigg	0	
24 April 2021 – 15:00	Swindon Town	Home	5–0	Grigg (4), Fraser	0	
1 May 2021 – 15:00	Fleetwood Town	Away	1–1	Brown	0	
9 May 2021 – 12:00	Rochdale	Home	0–3		0	

=== FA Cup ===
Matches

Win	Draw	Loss

Date	Round	Opponent	Venue	Result	Scorers	Attendance	Ref
8 November 2020 – 12:45	First round	Eastleigh	Away	0–0 (a.e.t.) (4–3 p)		0	
29 November 2020 – 13:30	Second round	Barnet	Away	1–0	Jerome	0	
9 January 2021 – 15:00	Third round	Burnley	Away	1–1 (a.e.t.) (3–4 p)	Jerome	0	

=== EFL Cup ===
Matches

Win	Draw	Loss

Date	Round	Opponent	Venue	Result	Scorers	Attendance	Ref
5 September 2020 – 15:00	First round	Coventry City	Home	0–1		0	

=== EFL Trophy ===
Southern Group C Table

Pos	Div	Team	Pld	W	PW	PL	L	GF	GA	GD	Pts	Qualification
1	L1	Milton Keynes Dons	3	2	0	0	1	7	5	+2	6	Advance to Round 2
2	L1	Northampton Town	3	1	1	0	1	6	3	+3	5	Advance to Round 2
3	L2	Stevenage	3	1	0	1	1	4	4	0	4	
4	ACA	Southampton U21	3	1	0	0	2	3	8	−5	3	

Source: EFL.com

Matches

Win	Draw	Loss

Date	Round	Opponent	Venue	Result	Scorers	Attendance	Ref
8 September 2020 – 19:00	Group stage	Northampton Town	Home	3–1	Poole, Nombe, Sorinola	0	
6 October 2020 – 17:30	Group stage	Stevenage	Away	3–2	Morris, Bird (2)	0	
11 November 2020 – 19:00	Group stage	Southampton U21	Home	1–2	Sorinola	0	
8 December 2020 – 19:45	Round of 32	Norwich City U21	Home	6–0	Agard (2), Sørensen, Poole (2), S. Walker		
12 January 2021 – 19:45	Round of 16	Northampton Town	Away	2–0	S. Walker (2)	0	
2 February 2021 – 18:30	Quarter-final	Sunderland	Home	0–3		0	

== Player details ==
Note: Players' ages as of the club's opening fixture of the 2020–21 season.

#	Name	Nationality	Position	Date of birth (age)	Signed from	Signed in	Transfer fee
Goalkeepers
1	Lee Nichols	(England)	GK	5 October 1992 (aged 27)	Free agent	2016	Free
13	Andy Fisher	(England)	GK	12 February 1998 (aged 22)	(England) Blackburn Rovers	2020	Undisclosed
Defenders
3	Dean Lewington	(England)	CB	18 May 1984 (aged 36)	(England) Wimbledon	2004	Free
4	Zak Jules	(Scotland)	CB	2 July 1997 (aged 23)	(England) Walsall	2021	Undisclosed
6	Harry Darling	(England)	CB	8 August 1999 (aged 21)	(England) Cambridge United	2021	Undisclosed
12	Ethan Laird	(England)	RWB	5 August 2001 (aged 19)	(England) Manchester United	2021	Loan
15	Warren O'Hora	(Republic of Ireland)	CB	19 April 1999 (aged 21)	(England) Brighton & Hove Albion	2021	Undisclosed
21	Daniel Harvie	(Scotland)	LWB	14 July 1998 (aged 22)	(Scotland) Ayr United	2020	Undisclosed
28	Jack Davies	(England)	CB	3 December 2002 (aged 17)	Academy	2020	Trainee
29	Matthew Sorinola	(England)	LWB	19 February 2001 (aged 19)	Academy	2019	Trainee
Midfielders
5	Josh McEachran	(England)	CM	1 March 1993 (aged 27)	Free agent	2019	Free
7	Ben Gladwin	(England)	CM	8 June 1992 (aged 28)	Free agent	2020	Free
8	David Kasumu	(Nigeria)	CM	5 October 1999 (aged 20)	Academy	2017	Trainee
10	Scott Fraser	(Scotland)	AM	30 March 1995 (aged 25)	Free agent	2020	Free
16	Andrew Surman	(England)	DM	20 August 1986 (aged 34)	Free agent	2020	Free
17	Matt O'Riley	(Denmark)	AM	21 November 2000 (aged 19)	Free agent	2021	Free
17	Lasse Sørensen	(Denmark)	CM	21 October 1999 (aged 20)	(England) Stoke City	2020	Loan
23	Louis Thompson	(Wales)	DM	19 December 1994 (aged 25)	(England) Norwich City	2020	Loan
24	Jordan Houghton	(England)	DM	5 November 1995 (aged 24)	Free agent	2018	Free
Forwards
9	Will Grigg	(Northern Ireland)	CF	3 July 1991 (aged 29)	(England) Sunderland	2021	Loan
11	Charlie Brown	(England)	CF	23 September 1999 (aged 20)	(England) Chelsea	2021	Undisclosed
14	Kieran Agard	(England)	CF	10 October 1989 (aged 30)	(England) Bristol City	2016	Undisclosed
20	Joe Mason	(Republic of Ireland)	CF	13 May 1991 (aged 29)	Free agent	2019	Free
27	Jay Bird	(England)	CF	6 May 2001 (aged 19)	Academy	2019	Trainee
35	Cameron Jerome	(England)	CF	14 August 1986 (aged 34)	Free transfer	2020	Free
36	Lewis Johnson	(England)	LW	9 January 2004 (aged 16)	Academy	2020	Trainee
Out on loan
19	Sam Nombe	(England)	CF	22 October 1998 (aged 21)	Academy	2017	Trainee
22	Laurie Walker	(England)	GK	14 October 1989 (aged 30)	Free agent	2019	Free
26	Hiram Boateng	(England)	AM	8 January 1996 (aged 24)	(England) Exeter City	2019	Compensation
30	John Freeman	(England)	CM	4 November 2001 (aged 18)	Academy	2019	Trainee
Left club during season
2	George Williams	(England)	RB	14 April 1993 (aged 27)	(England) Barnsley	2016	Free
4	Richard Keogh	(England)	CB	11 August 1986 (aged 34)	Free agent	2020	Free
5	Regan Poole	(Wales)	CB	18 June 1998 (aged 22)	(England) Manchester United	2019	Free
6	Baily Cargill	(England)	CB	5 July 1995 (aged 25)	Free agent	2018	Free
9	Carlton Morris	(England)	CF	16 December 1995 (aged 24)	(England) Norwich City	2020	Loan
11	Stephen Walker	(England)	SS	11 October 2000 (aged 19)	(England) Middlesbrough	2020	Loan
25	Callum Brittain	(England)	RB	12 March 1998 (aged 22)	Academy	2016	Trainee

== Transfers ==
=== Transfers in ===
Date from	Position	Name	From	Fee	Ref.
27 July 2020	LB	(Scotland) Daniel Harvie	(Scotland) Ayr United	Undisclosed	
28 July 2020	CM	(England) Ben Gladwin	Free agent	Free transfer	
7 August 2020	CB	(Republic of Ireland) Richard Keogh	Free agent	Free transfer	
12 August 2020	GK	(England) Laurie Walker	Free agent	Free transfer	
24 August 2020	CF	(Republic of Ireland) Joe Mason	Free agent	Free transfer	
25 August 2020	RB	(England) Callum Brittain	Free agent	Free transfer	
9 September 2020	AM	(Scotland) Scott Fraser	Free agent	Free transfer	
9 October 2020	CF	(England) Cameron Jerome	Free agent	Free transfer	
16 October 2020	GK	(England) Andy Fisher	Blackburn Rovers	Undisclosed	
17 November 2020	CM	(England) Andrew Surman	Free agent	Free transfer	
13 January 2021	CF	(England) Charlie Brown	Chelsea	Undisclosed	
18 January 2021	CB	(Republic of Ireland) Warren O'Hora	Brighton & Hove Albion	Undisclosed	
22 January 2021	CB	(England) Harry Darling	Cambridge United	Undisclosed	
24 January 2021	CM	(England) Matt O'Riley	Free agent	Free transfer	
1 February 2021	CB	(Scotland) Zak Jules	Walsall	Undisclosed	
1 March 2021	CM	(England) Josh McEachran	Free agent	Free transfer	

=== Transfers out ===
Date from	Position	Name	To	Fee	Ref.
1 July 2020	CF	(England) Dylan Asonganyi	Released (Note: Joined Oxford United on 18 August 2020.)		
1 July 2020	CF	(England) Jordan Bowery	Mansfield Town	Free transfer	
1 July 2020	CM	(England) Ryan Harley	Released (Note: Joined Bath City on 31 August 2020.)		
1 July 2020	CB	(Scotland) Russell Martin	Retired (Note: Continued as manager of the first team.)		
1 July 2020	GK	(England) Stuart Moore	Released (Note: Joined Wealdstone on 1 December 2020.)		
1 July 2020	CB	(England) Jordan Moore-Taylor	Released (Note: Joined Forest Green Rovers on 21 July 2020.)		
1 July 2020	CM	(England) Charlie Pattison	Released		
1 July 2020	AM	(Northern Ireland) Ben Reeves	Released (Note: Joined Plymouth Argyle on 3 September 2020.)		
1 July 2020	CB	(Wales) Joe Walsh	Released (Note: Joined Lincoln City on 13 August 2020.)		
27 July 2020	CM	(Scotland) Conor McGrandles	Lincoln City	Free transfer	
12 August 2020	CM	(England) Alex Gilbey	Charlton Athletic	Undisclosed	
27 August 2020	CF	(England) Rhys Healey	(France) Toulouse	Undisclosed	
10 October 2020	RB	(England) Callum Brittain	Barnsley	Undisclosed	
7 January 2021	CB	(England) Baily Cargill	Forest Green Rovers	Undisclosed	
19 January 2021	CB	(Republic of Ireland) Richard Keogh	Huddersfield Town	Undisclosed	
21 January 2021	RB	(England) George Williams	Bristol Rovers	Undisclosed	
30 January 2021	RB	(Wales) Regan Poole	Lincoln City	Undisclosed	

=== Loans in ===
Start date	Position	Name	From	End date	Ref.
24 July 2020	CF	(England) Carlton Morris	Norwich City	6 January 2021	
18 August 2020	CM	(Wales) Louis Thompson	Norwich City	End of season	
21 August 2020	CB	(Republic of Ireland) Warren O’Hora	Brighton & Hove Albion	18 January 2021 (Note: Originally on loan until end of season, made permanent on 18 January 2021.)	
4 September 2020	CM	(Denmark) Lasse Sørensen	Stoke City	End of season	
16 October 2020	SS	(England) Stephen Walker	Middlesbrough	13 January 2021	
8 January 2021	RB	(England) Ethan Laird	Manchester United	End of season	
1 February 2021	SS	(Northern Ireland) Will Grigg	Sunderland	End of season	

=== Loans out ===
Start date	Position	Name	To	End date	Ref.
9 October 2020	DM	(England) Hiram Boateng	Cambridge United	End of season (Note: Originally until January 2021, later extended.)	
16 October 2020	CF	(England) Sam Nombe	Luton Town	End of season	
13 March 2021	GK	(England) Laurie Walker	Oldham Athletic	End of season (Note: Originally until 20 March 2021, later extended.)	
20 April 2021	CM	(England) John Freeman	Woking	End of season	
