= Jack Davies (footballer, born 2002) =

English footballer

Personal information
- Full name: Jack Alan Davies
- Date of birth: 3 December 2002 (age 23)
- Place of birth: Milton Keynes, England
- Position: Defender

Team information
- Current team: Real Bedford

Youth career
- –2020: Milton Keynes Dons

Senior career*
Years	Team	Apps	(Gls)
2020–2023	Milton Keynes Dons	1	(0)
2021–2022	→ Oxford City (loan)	18	(0)
2022	→ Concord Rangers (loan)	14	(0)
2023	→ Oxford City (loan)	12	(1)
2023–2024	Banbury United	34	(0)
2024–2025	Hemel Hempstead Town	16	(0)
2024–2025	→ Bedford Town (dual-registration)	21	(2)
2025–	Real Bedford	0	(0)
- * Club domestic league appearances and goals as of 17:14, 29 June 2025 (UTC)

Jack Alan Davies (born 3 December 2002) is an English professional footballer who plays as a defender for Southern League Premier Division Central club Real Bedford.

== Club career ==
=== Milton Keynes Dons ===
Davies joined the academy of Milton Keynes Dons at a young age, and progressed through several age groups. He signed his first professional contract with the club on 24 August 2020. Davies made his professional debut on 11 November 2020, in a 1–2 EFL Trophy group stage home defeat to Southampton U21s, and later that season made his league debut on 16 January 2021 as a 77th-minute substitute in a 3–0 away defeat to Peterborough United.

The 2021–22 season saw limited first team opportunities for Davies, and he spent the first half of the season out on loan to National League South club Oxford City. Davies spent the majority of the following 2022–23 campaign on loan to National League South clubs Concord Rangers as well as a second loan spell with Oxford City in which he contributed to the club's play-off promotion success. Following his parent club's relegation, Davies was released at the end of his contract in June 2023.

=== Non-League ===
On 13 June 2023, Davies signed for National League North club Banbury United.

On 17 May 2024, Davies joined National League South club Hemel Hempstead Town. In December 2024, he joined Bedford Town on a dual-registration basis. On 26 April 2025, he scored in a 2–0 final-day victory as Bedford Town defeated Stourbridge to be crowned Southern League Premier Division Central champions.

In June 2025, Davies joined newly promoted Southern League Premier Division Central side Real Bedford.

== Career statistics ==
As of 7 May 2023

Appearances and goals by club, season and competition
Club	Season	League			FA Cup		League Cup		Other		Total	
Club	Season	Division	Apps	Goals	Apps	Goals	Apps	Goals	Apps	Goals	Apps	Goals
Milton Keynes Dons	2020–21	League One	1	0	0	0	0	0	4 (Note: Appearance(s) in EFL Trophy)	0	5	0
Milton Keynes Dons	2021–22	League One	0	0	—		0	0	0	0	0	0
Milton Keynes Dons	2022–23	League One	0	0	0	0	0	0	0	0	0	0
Milton Keynes Dons	Total		1	0	0	0	0	0	4	0	5	0
Oxford City (loan)	2021–22	National League South	18	0	0	0	0	0	1 (Note: Appearance(s) in FA Trophy)	0	19	0
Concord Rangers (loan)	2022–23	National League South	14	0	—		—		1	0	15	0
Oxford City (loan)	2022–23	National League South	12	1	—		—		1 (Note: Appearance(s) in 2022–23 National League South play-offs)	0	13	1
Career total			45	1	0	0	0	0	7	0	52	1

== Honours ==
Oxford City

- National League South play-offs: 2022–23

Bedford Town

- Southern League Premier Division Central: 2024–25
