= Warren O'Hora =

Irish footballer (born 1999)

Personal information
- Full name: Warren Patrick O'Hora
- Date of birth: 19 April 1999 (age 27)
- Place of birth: Dublin, Ireland
- Height: 1.83 m (6 ft 0 in)
- Position: Centre-back

Team information
- Current team: Leicester City
- Number: 16

Youth career
- –2016: Bohemians

Senior career*
Years	Team	Apps	(Gls)
2016–2017	Bohemians	11	(0)
2018–2021	Brighton & Hove Albion	0	(0)
2020–2021	→ Milton Keynes Dons (loan)	14	(0)
2021–2024	Milton Keynes Dons	136	(9)
2024–2026	Hibernian	63	(1)
2026–	Leicester City	9	(0)

International career^{‡}
2017	Republic of Ireland U18	4	(1)
2017	Republic of Ireland U19	2	(0)
- * Club domestic league appearances and goals as of 11:58, 22 November 2026 (UTC) ‡ National team caps and goals as of 23:59, 7 October 2017 (UTC)

Warren Patrick O'Hora (born 19 April 1999) is an Irish professional footballer who plays as a centre-back for EFL League One club Leicester City.

== Club career ==
=== Bohemians ===
O'Hora joined the academy of Bohemians at a young age. After progressing through several age groups he eventually broke into first team contention in 2016. He made his first team league debut on 16 June 2017, coming on as a 76th-minute substitute in a 3–1 away win over St Patrick's Athletic.

=== Brighton & Hove Albion ===
On 12 January 2018, following a successful trial period, O'Hora signed for English Premier League club Brighton & Hove Albion for an undisclosed fee, initially joining the club's reserve squad playing in Premier League 2.

Over the following two seasons he featured regularly for the reserve team, making over 30 appearances and scoring 4 goals. He was later awarded the club's Young Player of the Year honour for the 2019–20 season.

=== Milton Keynes Dons ===
On 21 August 2020, O'Hora joined League One club Milton Keynes Dons on a season-long loan. He made his debut on 8 September 2020, playing the full match of the 3–1 home win over Northampton in the EFL Trophy. He made his league debut in a 1–1 away draw at Doncaster. After 17 appearances in all competitions, O'Hora made his loan move permanent on 18 January 2021 for an undisclosed fee. On 2 March 2021, he scored his first senior professional goal in a 3–2 away defeat to Gillingham.

On 19 August 2022, O'Hora signed an extension to his contract keeping him at the club beyond the 2022–23 season. O'Hora was released by MK Dons at the end of the 2023–24 season.

=== Hibernian ===
It was announced on 26 June 2024 that O'Hora had signed for Hibernian of the Scottish Premiership. He made 85 appearances for Hibs in just over two seasons with the club.

=== Leicester City ===
O'Hora moved to Leicester City on 1 September 2026 for an undisclosed transfer fee.

== International career ==
Having featured for the Republic of Ireland U18 and U19 sides earlier in his career, O'Hora was later called up to a Republic of Ireland U21 training camp ahead of their UEFA Euro U21 2021 qualifying matches in October 2020.

== Career statistics ==
As of 21 November 2026

Appearances and goals by club, season and competition
Club	Season	League			National Cup		League Cup		Other		Total	
Club	Season	Division	Apps	Goals	Apps	Goals	Apps	Goals	Apps	Goals	Apps	Goals
Bohemians	2016	League of Ireland Premier	0	0	0	0	0	0	0	0	0	0
Bohemians	2017	League of Ireland Premier	11	0	0	0	0	0	0	0	11	0
Bohemians	Total		11	0	0	0	0	0	0	0	11	0
Brighton & Hove Albion U23	2018–19	—							1 (Note: Appearance(s) in EFL Trophy)	0	1	0
Brighton & Hove Albion U23	2019–20	—							2	1	2	1
Brighton & Hove Albion U23	Total		—						3	1	3	1
Brighton & Hove Albion	2020–21	Premier League	0	0	0	0	0	0	0	0	0	0
Milton Keynes Dons (loan)	2020–21	League One	14	0	1	0	0	0	2	0	17	0
Milton Keynes Dons	2020–21	League One	17	2	0	0	0	0	1	0	18	2
Milton Keynes Dons	2021–22	League One	46	2	2	0	1	0	5 (Note: Three appearances in EFL Trophy; two appearances in 2021–22 EFL League One play-offs)	0	54	2
Milton Keynes Dons	2022–23	League One	28	2	2	0	4	1	3	0	37	3
Milton Keynes Dons	2023–24	League Two	45	3	1	0	1	0	4 (Note: Two appearances in the EFL Trophy, two appearances in the 2023–24 EFL League Two play-offs)	0	51	3
Milton Keynes Dons	Total		136	9	5	0	6	1	13	0	160	10
Hibernian	2024–25	Scottish Premiership	32	1	2	0	5	1	0	0	39	2
Hibernian	2025–26	Scottish Premiership	29	0	1	0	1	0	6 (Note: Appearances in the UEFA Europa League and UEFA Conference League)	0	37	0
Hibernian	2026–27	Scottish Premiership	2	0	0	0	1	0	6 (Note: Appearances in the UEFA Conference League)	1	9	1
Hibernian	Total		63	1	3	0	7	1	12	1	85	3
Leicester City	2026–27	League One	9	0	1	0	0	0	2	0	12	0
Career total			233	12	10	0	12	2	32	2	287	14

== Honours ==
Individual

- Brighton & Hove Albion Young Player of the Year: 2019–20
