= Laurie Walker (footballer) =

English association football player

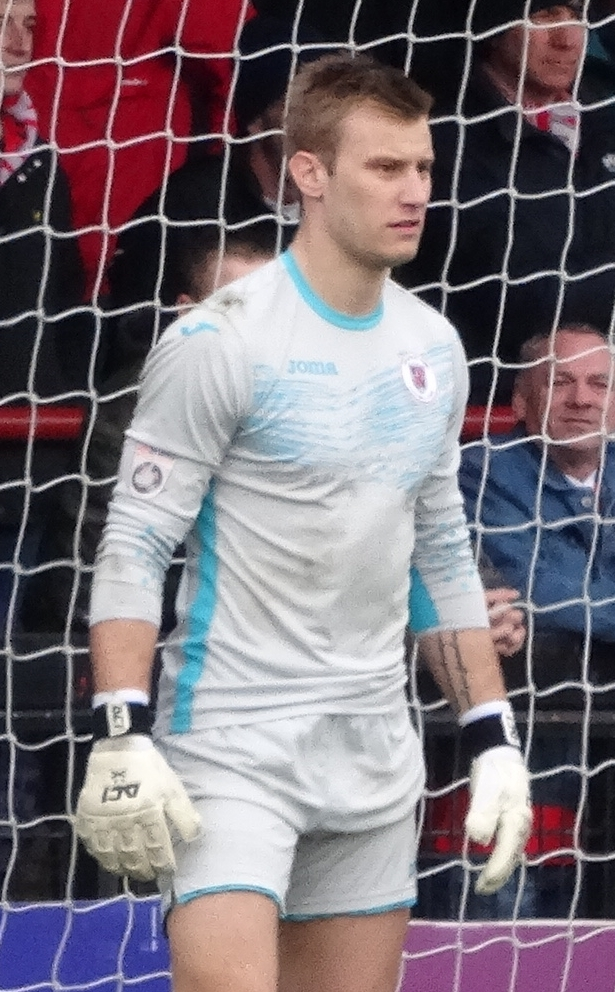
- Walker playing for Brackley Town in 2017

Personal information
- Full name: Laurie Dean Walker
- Date of birth: 14 October 1989 (age 37)
- Place of birth: Bedford, England
- Height: 6 ft 5 in (1.96 m)
- Position: Goalkeeper

Team information
- Current team: Bedford Town
- Number: 1

Youth career
- 2006–2009: Milton Keynes Dons

Senior career*
Years	Team	Apps	(Gls)
2009–2010	Cambridge United	1	(0)
2010–2011	Morecambe	0	(0)
2011–2012	Kettering Town	46	(0)
2012	Brackley Town	1	(0)
2012–2013	Leamington	18	(0)
2013–2015	Hemel Hempstead Town	80	(0)
2015–2017	Oxford City	41	(0)
2017	Brackley Town	39	(0)
2017–2019	Hemel Hempstead Town	81	(0)
2019–2022	Milton Keynes Dons	1	(0)
2019	→ Hampton & Richmond Borough (loan)	12	(0)
2019–2020	→ Chelmsford City (loan)	11	(0)
2021	→ Oldham Athletic (loan)	13	(0)
2021	→ Oldham Athletic (loan)	2	(0)
2021–2022	→ Aldershot Town (loan)	10	(0)
2022	Stevenage	1	(0)
2022–2024	Barnet	74	(0)
2024–2026	Solihull Moors	73	(0)
2025	→ Oxford City (loan)	11	(0)
2026–	Bedford Town	0	(0)
- * Club domestic league appearances and goals as of 20:51, 8th June 2026 (UTC)

Laurie Dean Walker (born 14 October 1989) is an English professional footballer who plays as a goalkeeper for National League North club Bedford Town.

== Career ==
=== Early career ===
Walker joined the academy of Milton Keynes Dons at the age of 12 and left the club in July 2009 at the end of his scholarship period. Following his release, Walker had brief spells with then Conference Premier club Cambridge United and League Two club Morecambe.

He made his professional debut on 6 February 2010 for Cambridge United in a 1–0 defeat away to Crawley Town. With Morecambe, on 31 August 2010 Walker featured in a 1-0 first round League Trophy defeat away to Macclesfield Town.

=== Non-League ===
After his exit from Morecambe at the end of the 2010–11 season, Walker went on to spend much of his career playing in non-League football for Kettering Town, Brackley Town, Leamington, Oxford City and Hemel Hempstead Town. For Hemel Hempstead Town, Walker made over 180 appearances in all competitions across two spells with the club.

=== Milton Keynes Dons ===
Following the mutual termination of his contract with Hemel Hempstead Town, on 1 July 2019 Walker returned to his boyhood club, newly promoted League One side Milton Keynes Dons. Prior to signing, Walker had spent time training with the club's first team as well as working as one of the club's academy goalkeeping coaches.

Walker was immediately loaned out to National League South club Hampton & Richmond Borough ahead of the 2019–20 season with the option of an immediate recall. On 18 December 2019, Walker signed for Chelmsford City on loan.

Following the conclusion of the 2019–20 season, Walker was one of nine players released by the club, but re-joined on 12 August 2020 ahead of the 2020–21 campaign. Walker finally made his professional first team debut for the club on 8 September 2020 in a 3–1 EFL Trophy group stage win over Northampton Town.

On 13 March 2021, Walker joined League Two club Oldham Athletic on an emergency loan as cover for injured goalkeeper Ian Lawlor. At the age of 31, he made his professional league debut the same day in a 4–2 home defeat to former club Cambridge United.

On 11 June 2021, Walker signed a contract extension to keep him at MK Dons for the 2021–22 season. On 17 August 2021, Walker returned to Oldham Athletic on a seven-day emergency loan. On 29 October 2021, Walker joined National League side, Aldershot Town on a short-term loan until January 2022.

=== Stevenage ===
Walker joined League Two club Stevenage on a permanent transfer on 6 January 2022, as backup to Christy Pym. He left the club at the end of the season.

=== Barnet ===
On 20 June 2022, Walker joined National League side Barnet on a permanent transfer from Stevenage. He was first choice keeper for most of his two-year spell with the Bees, and won the player of the year award in his first season, but later lost his place to loanee Josh Keeley. He left the club at the end of the 2023-24 season, after 90 appearances in all competitions.

=== Solihull Moors ===
Walker joined Solihull Moors for the 2024-25 season. He made 26 appearances for the Moors but lost his place as starting keeper and, on 18 February 2025, he re-joined Oxford City on loan until the end of the season.

=== Bedford Town ===
On 8 June 2026, Walker joined his hometown club Bedford Town, signing a two-year deal with the National League North club.

== Career statistics ==
As of 15 February 2025

Appearances and goals by club, season and competition
Club	Season	League			FA Cup		League Cup		Other		Total	
Club	Season	Division	Apps	Goals	Apps	Goals	Apps	Goals	Apps	Goals	Apps	Goals
Cambridge United	2009–10	Conference Premier	1	0	0	0	—		1 (Note: Appearance(s) in FA Trophy)	0	2	0
Morecambe	2010–11	League Two	0	0	0	0	0	0	1 (Note: Appearance(s) in EFL Trophy)	0	1	0
Kettering Town	2011–12	Conference Premier	40	0	2	0	—		1	0	43	0
Kettering Town	2012–13	Southern Premier	6	0	3	0	—		2 (Note: One appearance in FA Trophy, one in the Northamptonshire Senior Cup)	0	11	0
Kettering Town	Total		46	0	5	0	0	0	3	0	54	0
Brackley Town	2012–13	Conference North	1	0	0	0	—		0	0	1	0
Leamington	2012–13	Southern Premier	18	0	—		—		2 (Note: Appearances in Southern League Cup)	0	20	0
Hemel Hempstead Town	2013–14	Southern Premier	43	0	6	0	—		5 (Note: Three appearances in FA Trophy, two in Hertfordshire Senior Cup)	0	54	0
Hemel Hempstead Town	2014–15	Conference South	37	0	3	0	—		3	0	43	0
Hemel Hempstead Town	Total		80	0	9	0	—		8	0	97	0
Oxford City	2015–16	National League South	41	0	0	0	—		4	0	45	0
Brackley Town	2016–17	National League North	39	0	4	0	—		6	0	49	0
Hemel Hempstead Town	2017–18	National League South	39	0	0	0	—		0	0	39	0
Hemel Hempstead Town	2018–19	National League South	42	0	2	0	—		3	0	47	0
Hemel Hempstead Town	Total		81	0	2	0	—		3	0	86	0
Milton Keynes Dons	2019–20	League One	0	0	0	0	0	0	0	0	0	0
Milton Keynes Dons	2020–21	League One	0	0	0	0	0	0	3	0	3	0
Milton Keynes Dons	2021–22	League One	1	0	0	0	0	0	1	0	2	0
Milton Keynes Dons	Total		1	0	0	0	0	0	4	0	5	0
Hampton & Richmond Borough (loan)	2019–20	National League South	12	0	—		—		0	0	12	0
Chelmsford City (loan)	2019–20	National League North	11	0	—		—		2	0	13	0
Oldham Athletic (loan)	2020–21	League Two	13	0	—		—		—		13	0
Oldham Athletic (loan)	2021–22	League Two	2	0	0	0	1	0	0	0	3	0
Oldham Athletic (loan)	Total		15	0	0	0	1	0	0	0	16	0
Aldershot Town (loan)	2021–22	National League	10	0	—		—		1	0	11	0
Stevenage	2021–22	League Two	1	0	0	0	—		—		1	0
Barnet	2022–23	National League	45	0	4	0	—		6 (Note: Five appearances in FA Trophy, one in National League playoffs)	0	55	0
Barnet	2023–24	National League	29	0	5	0	—		1	0	35	0
Barnet	Total		74	0	9	0	0	0	7	0	90	0
Solihull Moors	2024–25	National League	21	0	4	0	—		1	0	26	0
Oxford City (loan)	2024–25	National League North	0	0	0	0	—		0	0	0	0
Career total			452	0	33	0	1	0	43	0	528	0
