= Daniel Harvie =

Scottish footballer (born 1998)

- Harvie with Wycombe Wanderers in 2026

Personal information
- Full name: Daniel William Harvie
- Date of birth: 14 July 1998 (age 28)
- Place of birth: Glasgow, Scotland
- Height: 5 ft 11 in (1.80 m)
- Position: Wing-back

Team information
- Current team: Wycombe Wanderers
- Number: 3

Youth career
- 2009–2016: Aberdeen

Senior career*
Years	Team	Apps	(Gls)
2016–2018	Aberdeen	4	(0)
2016–2017	→ Dumbarton (loan)	34	(3)
2018–2020	Ayr United	60	(1)
2020–2024	Milton Keynes Dons	144	(10)
2024–	Wycombe Wanderers	83	(3)

International career^{‡}
2013	Scotland U15	3	(0)
2013–2014	Scotland U16	2	(0)
2015	Scotland U17	6	(1)
2016–2017	Scotland U19	4	(0)
2018–2020	Scotland U21	13	(0)
- * Club domestic league appearances and goals as of 11 October 2026 (UTC) ‡ National team caps and goals as of 23:00, 17 November 2020 (UTC)

Daniel William Harvie (born 14 July 1998) is a Scottish professional footballer who plays as a wing-back for EFL League One club Wycombe Wanderers.

== Club career ==
=== Aberdeen ===
Harvie joined the academy of Aberdeen at the age of 11 and progressed through several age groups. He made his first-team debut for as an injury-time substitute in a Scottish Premiership 2–1 away win over Partick Thistle on 8 March 2016.

On 3 August 2016, Harvie joined Scottish Championship club Dumbarton on loan, initially until January 2017. Whilst on loan, he scored his first professional goal in a 4–4 draw with Ayr United in December 2016. His loan was later extended until the end of the season. Following 34 appearances and three goals, he picked up the club's Young Player of the Year award at the end of the season

Harvie returned to Aberdeen for the 2017–18 campaign, but found first team opportunities limited and he was released by the club at the end of the season.

=== Ayr United ===
After leaving Aberdeen, Harvie signed for newly-promoted Scottish Championship side Ayr United on a two-year deal on 26 June 2018. He later went on to be named the club's Player of the Year for the 2019–20 season.

=== Milton Keynes Dons ===
After two seasons with Ayr United, Harvie joined League One club Milton Keynes Dons for an undisclosed fee on 27 July 2020. He scored his first goal for the club on 3 October 2020 in a 1–1 draw at home to Ipswich Town. On 1 September 2022, Harvie signed a contract extension keeping him at the club beyond the end of the 2022–23 season.

=== Wycombe Wanderers ===
On 3 July 2024, Harvie joined League One club Wycombe Wanderers for an undisclosed fee.

== International career ==
Harvie played for the Scotland U17 side in 2015. He was called up to the Scotland U19 squad in August 2016. Harvie was named in the Scotland U19 squad for the elite round of the European Championships in March 2017, alongside Dumbarton loanee teammate Ross McCrorie.

Selected for the Scotland under-21 squad in the 2018 Toulon Tournament, the team lost to Turkey in a penalty-out and finished fourth.

== Career statistics ==
As of 5 October 2024

Appearances and goals by club, season and competition
Club	Season	League			National cup (Note: Includes Scottish Cup, FA Cup)		League cup (Note: Includes Scottish League Cup, EFL Cup)		Other		Total	
Club	Season	Division	Apps	Goals	Apps	Goals	Apps	Goals	Apps	Goals	Apps	Goals
Aberdeen	2015–16	Scottish Premiership	2	0	0	0	0	0	0	0	2	0
Aberdeen	2016–17	Scottish Premiership	0	0	0	0	0	0	1 (Note: Appearance for Aberdeen U20 in the Scottish Challenge Cup, in which age-restricted teams from the Scottish Premiership clubs compete against senior clubs)	0	1	0
Aberdeen	2017–18	Scottish Premiership	2	0	1	0	0	0	1	0	4	0
Aberdeen	Total		4	0	1	0	0	0	2	0	7	0
Dumbarton (loan)	2016–17	Scottish Championship	34	3	0	0	0	0	0	0	34	3
Ayr United	2018–19	Scottish Championship	33	0	2	0	6	0	3 (Note: One appearance in the Scottish Challenge Cup; Two appearances in the Scottish Premiership play-offs)	0	44	0
Ayr United	2019–20	Scottish Championship	27	1	2	0	4	0	0	0	33	1
Ayr United	Total		60	1	4	0	10	0	3	0	77	1
Milton Keynes Dons	2020–21	EFL League One	31	3	3	0	0	0	3 (Note: Appearance(s) in EFL Trophy)	0	37	3
Milton Keynes Dons	2021–22	EFL League One	41	1	1	0	1	0	3 (Note: One appearance EFL Trophy, two appearances in 2021–22 EFL League One play-offs)	0	46	1
Milton Keynes Dons	2022–23	EFL League One	34	3	2	0	2	0	2	0	40	3
Milton Keynes Dons	2023–24	EFL League Two	38	3	1	0	1	0	3 (Note: One appearance EFL Trophy, two appearances in 2023–24 EFL League Two play-offs)	0	43	3
Milton Keynes Dons	Total		144	10	7	0	4	0	11	0	166	10
Wycombe Wanderers	2024–25	EFL League One	9	1	0	0	2	0	1	0	12	1
Career total			251	15	12	0	16	0	17	0	296	15

== Honours ==
Individual

- Dumbarton Young Player of the Year: 2016–17
- Ayr United Player of the Year: 2019–20
