= Dean Lewington =

English footballer (born 1984)

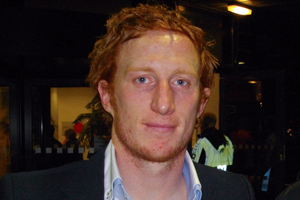
- Lewington in 2011

Personal information
- Full name: Dean Scott Lewington
- Date of birth: 18 May 1984 (age 42)
- Place of birth: Kingston upon Thames, England
- Height: 6 ft 0 in (1.83 m)
- Positions: Left-back; centre-back

Youth career
- –2003: Wimbledon

Senior career*
| Years | Team | Apps | (Gls) |
| 2003–2004 | Wimbledon | 29 | (1) |
| 2004–2025 | Milton Keynes Dons | 791 | (21) |
| Total | | 820 | (22) |

Managerial career
- 2021: Milton Keynes Dons (caretaker)
- 2022: Milton Keynes Dons (caretaker)
- 2024: Milton Keynes Dons (caretaker)
- * Club domestic league appearances and goals

Dean Scott Lewington (born 18 May 1984) is an English former professional footballer who played as a left-back and centre-back. He spent most of his career at EFL League One club Milton Keynes Dons, where he was also club captain.

Lewington is Milton Keynes Dons' longest-serving player and, as of 26 December 2023, holds the record for the most career league appearances by any player for a single club in the history of the English Football League. On that date, Lewington made his 771st career League appearance against Colchester United, overtaking John Trollope's previous record of 770 appearances for Swindon Town.

Since May 2025, he holds the post of Individual Development Coach for Milton Keynes Dons' Development Squad.

== Club career ==
=== Wimbledon ===
Born in Kingston upon Thames, London, Lewington made his Wimbledon first team debut on 5 April 2003, coming on as a last-minute substitute for Alex Tapp in a 4–2 First Division defeat to Sheffield Wednesday at Hillsborough, his only appearance of the season.

On 1 November 2003, he made his first start, in a 2–1 win over Bradford City at the National Hockey Stadium, their first victory in Milton Keynes. He scored his first goal on 26 December in a 3–0 win away to Reading at the Madejski Stadium, heading Adam Nowland's cross for the second of the game. Lewington was sent off for violent conduct near the end of the team's 0–3 home defeat to Coventry City on 21 February 2004. At the end of the season, Wimbledon were relegated.

Overall, he made 32 senior appearances for Wimbledon.

=== Milton Keynes Dons ===
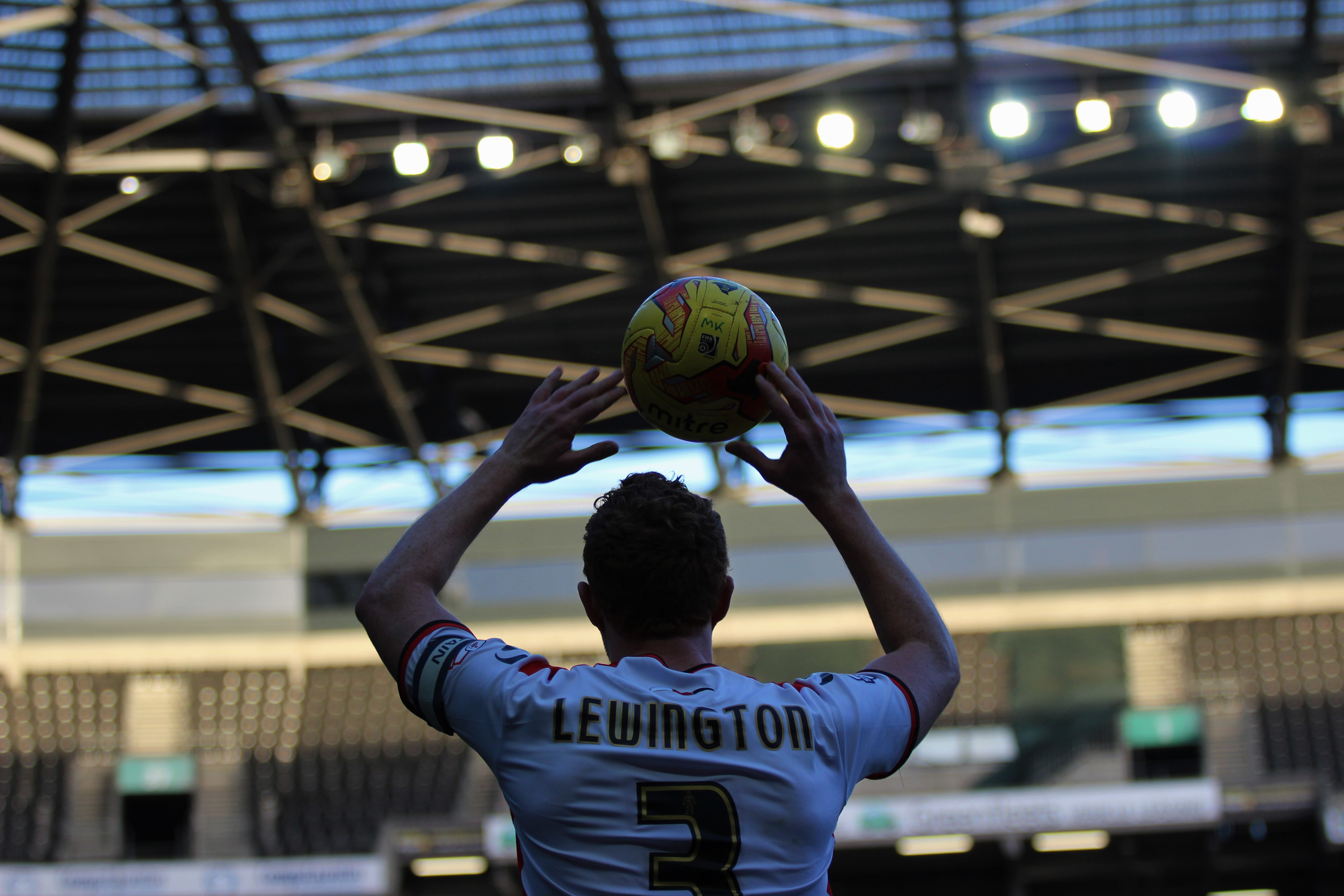
Lewington takes a throw in against Barnsley in 2015

Having moved to Milton Keynes in 2003, Wimbledon were relaunched in 2004 as Milton Keynes Dons, in the newly renamed League One. Lewington almost moved to Huddersfield Town in 2005 in an exchange deal involving Pawel Abbott, however Abbott chose to stay at Huddersfield thus ending their interest. As of November 2024, Lewington is the only former Wimbledon player at Milton Keynes Dons.

He received the MK Dons captaincy after the departure of Keith Andrews to Blackburn Rovers in August 2008. On 21 March 2011, Lewington led his team to a 1–0 victory over promotion rivals Peterborough United. The Dons reached the play-offs but were defeated by Peterborough. On 2 December 2012, Lewington captained his side against AFC Wimbledon in their highly publicised first meeting. On 12 January 2013, Lewington made his 400th league appearance for Milton Keynes Dons against Bury.

Lewington scored his only goal of the 2013–14 League One season in the last minute of a 3–2 victory over Stevenage at Broadhall Way. The 2–2 draw with Rotherham United at the New York Stadium on 26 April 2014 saw Lewington make his 500th appearance for Milton Keynes Dons in all competitions. To celebrate his 500th appearance for the club, supporters of Milton Keynes Dons got together for the last home game of the season against Leyton Orient, and wore as much orange as possible (due to Lewington's hair colour). This campaign was dubbed "Orange4Lewie" and gained some publicity from Twitter, Facebook and other social media.

On 3 May 2015, Lewington scored twice and assisted two further goals as the Dons defeated Yeovil Town 5–1 on the final day of the season to earn their first promotion to the Championship. On 20 May 2014, Milton Keynes Dons announced a testimonial match against Nottingham Forest would be played in honour of Lewington's ten years of service for the club. The match was played on 27 July 2014 at stadium:mk although 4,121 attended the game, of whom 1,286 were from Nottingham Forest. At the time of his testimonial, Lewington had amassed over 500 appearances in league and cup competitions for Milton Keynes Dons.

Between January and May 2018 Lewington temporarily worked in a player-coach role for the club under then manager Dan Micciche. Lewington achieved his 600th league appearance and 700th appearance in all competitions for the club in January 2019 in consecutive games against Crewe Alexandra and Grimsby Town. During the 2018–19 season he played a key role in the club's automatic promotion from League Two, playing every league game during the campaign and achieving his third automatic promotion with the club.

Lewington signed a further contract extension with the club in July 2020, at which point he was the longest-serving player for a single club in the Football League. On 18 March 2021 – on the verge of his 800th appearance for the club – his contract was extended once again taking him into his 18th season with the MK Dons. On 29 April 2021, Lewington's 800th appearance was recognised as the Moment of the Season at the 2021 EFL Awards. He was named Milton Keynes Dons Player of the Year for the 2020–21 season on 7 May 2021.

On 3 August 2021, just four days before the beginning of the 2021–22 season, MK Dons announced Lewington would take over as interim caretaker manager following the departure of Russell Martin, whilst the club sought a permanent replacement. On 11 September 2021, Lewington made his 700th league appearance for the club in a 1–0 victory over Portsmouth. On 3 May 2022, Dean Lewington signed a new contract until 2023, taking him into his 19th season with the club.

Despite relegation in the 2022–23 season, Lewington extended his contract with the club and was included in the Dons' retained list on 20 May 2023. On 26 December 2023, Lewington made his 771st league appearance for MK Dons, setting a new record for most career league appearances by a player for a single club in the history of the English Football League, a record previously held by Swindon Town's John Trollope since 1981.

On 11 January 2024, in recognition of his record-breaking appearances and contribution to the club's perfect league record during the month prior, Lewington was named the EFL League Two Player of the Month for December 2023.

On 16 May 2024, shortly before his 40th birthday, Lewington signed another contract extension lasting until 2025. He was later awarded the PFA Merit Award for 2024 in honour of his services to football. Following the departure of Mike Williamson to Carlisle United on 19 September 2024, Lewington became caretaker head coach of the club for a third time. On 7 April 2025, MK Dons announced that Lewington would retire at the end of the season. On 3 May 2025, he played his 917th and final game for the club against Swindon Town, coming on as a 93rd-minute substitute.

== Personal life ==
He is the son of former England assistant manager Ray Lewington, and the cousin of fellow footballer Luke Ayling. Lewington has two daughters: Willow (born 2017) and Lottie (2020).

== Career statistics ==
=== As a player ===
As of 3 May 2025

Appearances and goals by club, season and competition
| Club | Season | League | | | FA Cup | | League Cup | | Other | | Total | |
| Club | Season | Division | Apps | Goals | Apps | Goals | Apps | Goals | Apps | Goals | Apps | Goals |
|---|---|---|---|---|---|---|---|---|---|---|---|---|
| Wimbledon | 2002–03 | First Division | 1 | 0 | 0 | 0 | 0 | 0 | — | | 1 | 0 |
| Wimbledon | 2003–04 | First Division | 28 | 1 | 3 | 0 | 0 | 0 | — | | 31 | 1 |
| Wimbledon | Total | | 29 | 1 | 3 | 0 | 0 | 0 | — | | 32 | 1 |
| Milton Keynes Dons | 2004–05 | League One | 43 | 2 | 3 | 0 | 1 | 0 | 1 (Note: Appearance(s) in Football League Trophy) | 1 | 48 | 3 |
| Milton Keynes Dons | 2005–06 | League One | 44 | 1 | 3 | 0 | 1 | 0 | 3 | 0 | 51 | 1 |
| Milton Keynes Dons | 2006–07 | League Two | 45 | 1 | 3 | 0 | 2 | 0 | 2 (Note: Appearances in 2006–07 Football League Two play-offs) | 0 | 52 | 1 |
| Milton Keynes Dons | 2007–08 | League Two | 45 | 0 | 1 | 0 | 1 | 0 | 6 | 0 | 53 | 0 |
| Milton Keynes Dons | 2008–09 | League One | 40 | 2 | 1 | 0 | 2 | 0 | 3 (Note: Two appearances in 2008–09 Football League One play-offs and one appearance in Football League Trophy) | 0 | 46 | 2 |
| Milton Keynes Dons | 2009–10 | League One | 42 | 1 | 3 | 0 | 0 | 0 | 5 | 1 | 50 | 2 |
| Milton Keynes Dons | 2010–11 | League One | 42 | 3 | 2 | 0 | 3 | 0 | 3 (Note: Two appearances in 2010–11 Football League One play-offs and one appearance in Football League Trophy) | 0 | 50 | 3 |
| Milton Keynes Dons | 2011–12 | League One | 46 | 3 | 3 | 0 | 3 | 1 | 3 (Note: Two appearances in 2011–12 Football League One play-offs and one appearance in Football League Trophy) | 0 | 55 | 4 |
| Milton Keynes Dons | 2012–13 | League One | 38 | 1 | 7 | 0 | 2 | 0 | 0 | 0 | 47 | 1 |
| Milton Keynes Dons | 2013–14 | League One | 43 | 1 | 4 | 0 | 0 | 0 | 2 | 0 | 49 | 1 |
| Milton Keynes Dons | 2014–15 | League One | 41 | 3 | 3 | 0 | 4 | 0 | 1 | 0 | 49 | 3 |
| Milton Keynes Dons | 2015–16 | Championship | 46 | 1 | 2 | 0 | 2 | 0 | — | | 50 | 1 |
| Milton Keynes Dons | 2016–17 | League One | 36 | 1 | 4 | 0 | 0 | 0 | 1 (Note: Appearance(s) in EFL Trophy) | 0 | 41 | 1 |
| Milton Keynes Dons | 2017–18 | League One | 22 | 0 | 1 | 0 | 2 | 0 | 3 | 0 | 28 | 0 |
| Milton Keynes Dons | 2018–19 | League Two | 46 | 1 | 1 | 0 | 1 | 0 | 1 | 0 | 49 | 1 |
| Milton Keynes Dons | 2019–20 | League One | 33 | 0 | 1 | 0 | 2 | 0 | 3 | 0 | 39 | 0 |
| Milton Keynes Dons | 2020–21 | League One | 43 | 0 | 3 | 0 | 1 | 0 | 3 | 0 | 50 | 0 |
| Milton Keynes Dons | 2021–22 | League One | 44 | 0 | 1 | 0 | 0 | 0 | 2 (Note: Appearances in 2021–22 EFL League One play-offs) | 0 | 47 | 0 |
| Milton Keynes Dons | 2022–23 | League One | 26 | 0 | 1 | 0 | 0 | 0 | 1 | 0 | 28 | 0 |
| Milton Keynes Dons | 2023–24 | League Two | 20 | 0 | 1 | 0 | 0 | 0 | 3 | 0 | 24 | 0 |
| Milton Keynes Dons | 2024–25 | League Two | 6 | 0 | 1 | 0 | 1 | 0 | 3 | 0 | 11 | 0 |
| Milton Keynes Dons | Total | | 791 | 21 | 49 | 0 | 28 | 1 | 49 | 2 | 917 | 24 |
| Career total | | | 820 | 22 | 52 | 0 | 28 | 1 | 49 | 2 | 949 | 25 |

=== As a manager ===
As of 15 January 2025

Managerial record by team and tenure
| Team | Nat | From | To | Record | | | | | | | | Ref |
| Team | Nat | From | To | G | W | D | L | GF | GA | GD | Win % | Ref |
|---|---|---|---|---|---|---|---|---|---|---|---|---|
| Milton Keynes Dons (caretaker) | (England) | 3 August 2021 | 13 August 2021 | 1 | 0 | 1 | 0 | 3 | 3 | +0 | 0.00 | |
| Milton Keynes Dons (caretaker) | (England) | 11 December 2022 | 23 December 2022 | 3 | 1 | 0 | 2 | 3 | 7 | −4 | 33.33 | |
| Milton Keynes Dons (caretaker) | (England) | 19 September 2024 | 25 September 2024 | 1 | 0 | 1 | 0 | 1 | 1 | +0 | 0.00 | |
| Total | | | | 5 | 1 | 2 | 2 | 7 | 11 | −4 | 20.00 | |

== Honours ==
Milton Keynes Dons

- Football League One second-place promotion: 2014–15
- Football/EFL League Two: 2007–08; third-place promotion: 2018–19
- Football League Trophy: 2007–08

Individual

- PFA Team of the Year: 2007–08 League Two, 2008–09 League One
- Football League One Player of the Month: November 2008
- Milton Keynes Dons Player of the Decade
- Milton Keynes Dons Player of the Year: 2020–21
- EFL Moment of the Season: 2021
- EFL League Two Player of the Month: December 2023
- PFA Merit Award: 2024
- Sir Tom Finney Award: 2026

Orders

- Freedom of the City of Milton Keynes: 2025

Records

- Most career league appearances for a single club in the history of the English Football League
