= 2019–20 Chelsea F.C. season =

English football club season

Chelsea
2019–20 season
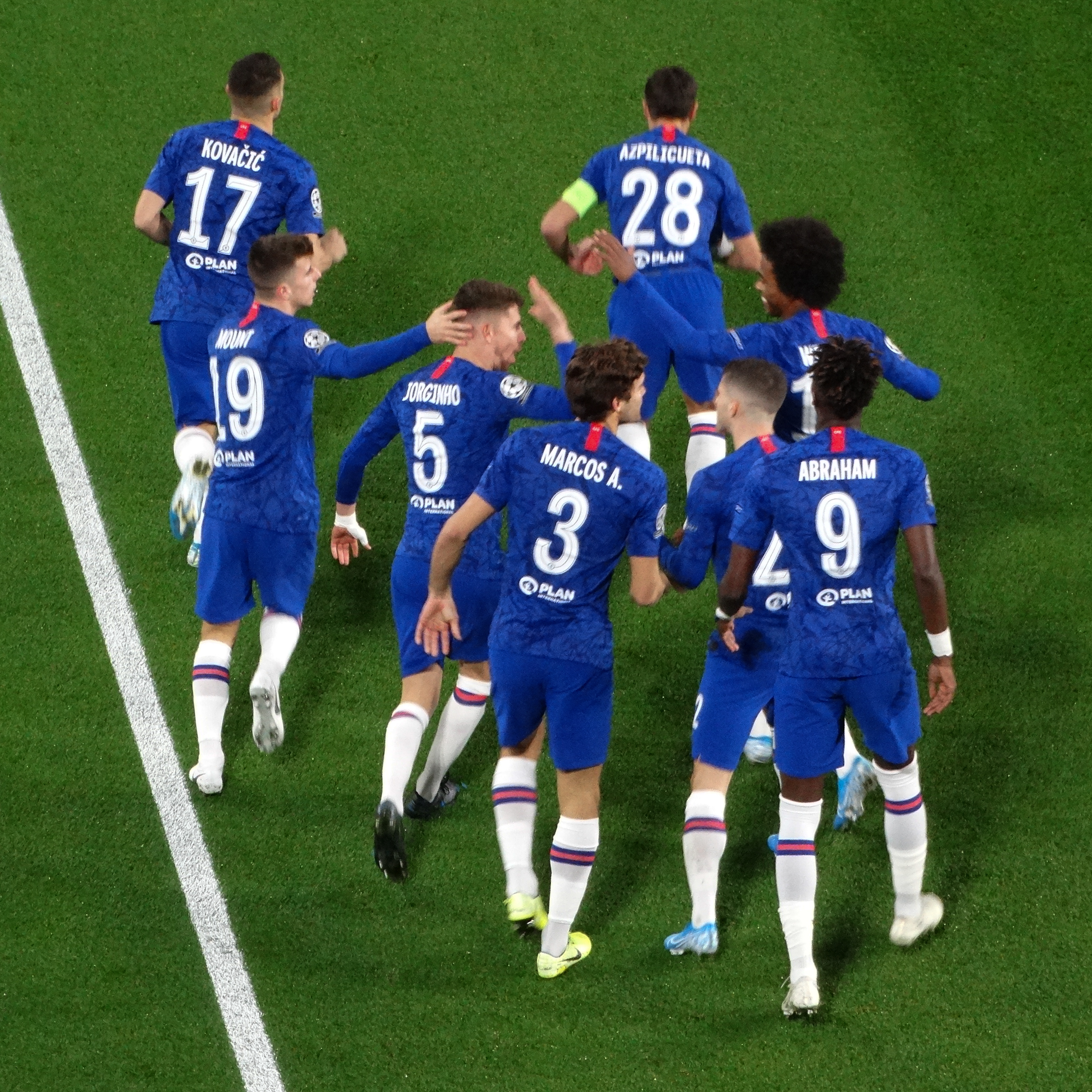
- Chelsea players after a goal scored against Ajax at a UEFA Champions League match
- Owner: Roman Abramovich
- Chairman: Bruce Buck
- Head coach: Frank Lampard
- Stadium: Stamford Bridge
- Premier League: 4th
- FA Cup: Runners-up
- EFL Cup: Fourth round
- UEFA Champions League: Round of 16
- UEFA Super Cup: Runners-up
- Top goalscorer: League: Tammy Abraham (15); All: Tammy Abraham (18)
- Highest home attendance: 40,694 (vs. Everton, 8 March 2020, Premier League)
- Lowest home attendance: 36,761 (vs. Bayern Munich, 25 February 2020, UEFA Champions League)
- Average home league attendance: 40,563
- Biggest win: 7–1 (vs. Grimsby Town, 25 September 2019, EFL Cup)
- Biggest defeat: 0–4 (vs. Manchester United, 11 August 2019, Premier League)
Home colours	Away colours	Third colours

The 2019–20 season was Chelsea's 106th competitive season, 31st consecutive season in the top flight of English football, 28th consecutive season in the Premier League, and 114th year in existence as a football club. The season was slated to cover the period from 1 July 2019 to 30 June 2020, but due to the suspension of football due to the COVID-19 pandemic, it was extended to 8 August 2020.

The season was the first since 2011–12 without Eden Hazard, who departed to Real Madrid.

On 16 June 2019, manager Maurizio Sarri departed Chelsea, signing for Juventus. On 4 July, former player Frank Lampard signed on a three-year contract, replacing Sarri as head coach.

== Kits ==
Home	Home alt.	Home special	Home 2020–21	Away	Away alt.	Away 2020–21	Away 2018–19	Third
Third alt.	Goalkeeper 1	Goalkeeper 2	Goalkeeper 3	Goalkeeper 4	Goalkeeper 5	Goalkeeper 1 2020–21	Goalkeeper 2 2020–21	Goalkeeper 3 2020–21

== Management team ==
Position	Name
Head coach	(England) Frank Lampard
Assistant head coach	(England) Jody Morris
Assistant coaches	(England) Joe Edwards
Assistant coaches	(England) Chris Jones
Goalkeeper coach	(Portugal) Henrique Hilário
Assistant goalkeeper coach	(England) James Russell

== Players ==
No.	Pos.	Player	Nationality	Date of birth (age)	Since	Ends	Apps	Goals
1	GK	Kepa Arrizabalaga	(Spain)	3 October 1994 (aged 25)	2018	2025	95	0
2	DF	Antonio Rüdiger	(Germany)	3 March 1993 (aged 27)	2017	2022	115	6
3	DF	Marcos Alonso	(Spain)	28 December 1990 (aged 29)	2016	2023	149	22
4	DF	Andreas Christensen	(Denmark)	10 April 1996 (aged 24)	2013	2022	100	0
5	MF	Jorginho ^{(VC)}	(Italy)	20 December 1991 (aged 28)	2018	2023	98	9
7	MF	N'Golo Kanté	(France)	29 March 1991 (aged 29)	2016	2023	170	11
8	MF	Ross Barkley	(England)	5 December 1993 (aged 26)	2018	2023	83	10
9	FW	Tammy Abraham	(England)	2 October 1997 (aged 22)	2016	2022	50	18
10	MF	Willian ^{(3C)}	(Brazil)	9 August 1988 (aged 31)	2013	2020	339	63
11	MF	Pedro	(Spain)	28 July 1987 (aged 32)	2015	2020	206	43
12	MF	Ruben Loftus-Cheek	(England)	23 January 1996 (aged 24)	2014	2024	81	12
13	GK	Willy Caballero	(Argentina)	28 September 1981 (aged 38)	2017	2021	36	0
15	DF	Kurt Zouma	(France)	27 October 1994 (aged 25)	2014	2023	114	5
17	MF	Mateo Kovačić	(Croatia)	6 May 1994 (aged 26)	2019	2024	98	2
18	FW	Olivier Giroud	(France)	30 September 1986 (aged 33)	2018	2021	88	28
19	MF	Mason Mount	(England)	10 January 1999 (aged 21)	2017	2024	53	8
20	MF	Callum Hudson-Odoi	(England)	7 November 2000 (aged 19)	2018	2024	61	8
22	MF	Christian Pulisic	(United States)	18 September 1998 (aged 21)	2019	2024	34	11
23	FW	Michy Batshuayi	(Belgium)	2 October 1993 (aged 26)	2016	2021	77	25
24	DF	Reece James	(England)	8 December 1999 (aged 20)	2018	2025	37	2
28	DF	César Azpilicueta ^{(C)}	(Spain)	28 August 1989 (aged 30)	2012	2022	386	13
29	DF	Fikayo Tomori	(England)	19 December 1997 (aged 22)	2016	2024	23	2
31	GK	Jamie Cumming	(England)	4 September 1999 (aged 20)	2018	2023	0	0
33	DF	Emerson	(Italy)	3 August 1994 (aged 25)	2018	2022	55	1
47	MF	Billy Gilmour	(Scotland)	11 June 2001 (aged 19)	2019	2023	11	0
55	MF	Tino Anjorin	(England)	23 November 2001 (aged 18)	2019	2025	2	0
57	FW	Armando Broja	(Albania)	10 September 2001 (aged 18)	2020	2022	1	0
61	DF	Henry Lawrence	(England)	21 September 2001 (aged 18)	2020	2022	0	0
63	DF	Ian Maatsen	(Netherlands)	10 March 2002 (aged 18)	2019	2024	1	0
64	MF	Lewis Bate	(England)	28 October 2002 (aged 17)	2020	2022	0	0
66	DF	Dynel Simeu	(England)	13 March 2002 (aged 18)	2020	2021	0	0

Last updated: 8 August 2020.
Source: Chelsea F.C.

== Transfers ==
=== In ===
==== Summer ====
Date	No.	Pos.	Player	From	Fee	Source
1 July 2019	17	MF	(Croatia) Mateo Kovačić	(Spain) Real Madrid	£40,500,000	

==== Winter ====
Date	No.	Pos.	Player	From	Fee	Source
1 January 2020		FW	(Norway) Bryan Fiabema	(Norway) Tromsø	£540,000	

=== Out ===
==== Summer ====
Date	No.	Pos.	Player	To	Fee	Source
1 July 2019		MF	(Belgium) Kylian Hazard	(Belgium) Cercle Brugge	Undisclosed	
1 July 2019	31	GK	(England) Robert Green	Retired		
1 July 2019		DF	(England) Fankaty Dabo	(England) Coventry City	Free	
1 July 2019	10	MF	(Belgium) Eden Hazard	(Spain) Real Madrid	£103,500,000	
1 July 2019		DF	(Nigeria) Ola Aina	(Italy) Torino	£8,820,000	
1 July 2019		GK	(England) Bradley Collins	(England) Barnsley	Free	
1 July 2019		GK	(Portugal) Eduardo	(Portugal) Braga	Free	
1 July 2019		DF	(England) Jay Dasilva	(England) Bristol City	£2,160,000	
1 July 2019		GK	(Northern Ireland) Jared Thompson	Unattached (Note: Thompson joined Exeter City on 18 February 2020)		
1 July 2019		MF	(Ivory Coast) Victorien Angban	(France) Metz	£5,400,000	
1 July 2019		DF	(Czech Republic) Tomáš Kalas	(England) Bristol City	£8,100,000	
4 July 2019		MF	(Scotland) Ruben Sammut	(England) Sunderland	Free	
6 July 2019	59	GK	(Poland) Marcin Bułka	(France) Paris Saint-Germain	Free	
13 July 2019	65	DF	(England) Renedi Masampu	(England) Whyteleafe	Free	
14 July 2019	56	FW	(England) Martell Taylor-Crossdale	(England) Fulham	Free	
18 July 2019	58	FW	(Netherlands) Daishawn Redan	(Germany) Hertha BSC	£2,430,000	
26 July 2019		MF	(Ecuador) Josimar Quintero	(Spain) Espanyol B	Free	
27 July 2019		DF	(England) Todd Kane	(England) Queens Park Rangers	Free	
29 July 2019		MF	(United States) Kyle Scott	(England) Newcastle United	Free	
1 August 2019		MF	(England) Kasey Palmer	(England) Bristol City	£3,420,000	
5 August 2019	24	DF	(England) Gary Cahill	(England) Crystal Palace	Free	
8 August 2019	30	DF	(Brazil) David Luiz	(England) Arsenal	£7,830,000	
13 August 2019		DF	(Nigeria) Kenneth Omeruo	(Spain) Leganés	£4,500,000	
2 September 2019	47	DF	(Sweden) Joseph Colley	(Italy) Chievo	Free	

==== Winter ====
Date	No.	Pos.	Player	To	Fee	Source
1 January 2020		DF	(Jamaica) Michael Hector	(England) Fulham	£5,310,000	
31 January 2020	51	MF	(England) Clinton Mola	(Germany) Stuttgart	£360,000	
31 January 2020	48	DF	(England) Tariq Lamptey	(England) Brighton & Hove Albion	£2,970,000	

=== Loan out ===
==== Summer ====
Date	Until	No.	Pos.	Player	To	Fee	Source
1 July 2019	23 January 2020		MF	(Nigeria) Victor Moses	(Turkey) Fenerbahçe	Free	
1 July 2019	30 June 2020		FW	(Spain) Álvaro Morata	(Spain) Atlético Madrid	Free	
1 July 2019	30 April 2020		GK	(England) Nathan Baxter	(Scotland) Ross County	Free	
1 July 2019	31 May 2020	48	DF	(England) Richard Nartey	(England) Burton Albion	Free	
3 July 2019	31 August 2020		MF	(Croatia) Mario Pašalić	(Italy) Atalanta	£1,350,000	
5 July 2019	30 June 2020		MF	(Belgium) Charly Musonda	(Netherlands) Vitesse	Free	
8 July 2019	30 June 2020		MF	(Brazil) Nathan	(Brazil) Atlético Mineiro	Free	
18 July 2019	1 January 2020	49	MF	(England) Luke McCormick	(England) Shrewsbury Town	Free	
22 July 2019	30 June 2020	44	DF	(Wales) Ethan Ampadu	(Germany) RB Leipzig	£590,000	
24 July 2019	31 July 2020		DF	(England) Jake Clarke-Salter	(England) Birmingham City	Free	
24 July 2019	31 July 2020		DF	(United States) Matt Miazga	(England) Reading	Free	
24 July 2019	22 January 2020		MF	(England) Lewis Baker	(Germany) Fortuna Düsseldorf	Free	
1 August 2019	31 May 2020		DF	(England) Dujon Sterling	(England) Wigan Athletic	Free	
2 August 2019	14 January 2020	43	MF	(England) Conor Gallagher	(England) Charlton Athletic	Free	
3 August 2019	30 June 2020	43	FW	(England) Ike Ugbo	(Netherlands) Roda JC	Free	
8 August 2019	31 May 2020		DF	(England) Josh Grant	(England) Plymouth Argyle	Free	
8 August 2019	1 January 2020		MF	(England) Jacob Maddox	(England) Tranmere Rovers	Free	
8 August 2019	6 January 2020	6	MF	(England) Danny Drinkwater	(England) Burnley	Free	
8 August 2019	31 July 2020		DF	(England) Trevoh Chalobah	(England) Huddersfield Town	Free	
8 August 2019	31 July 2020		FW	(England) Isaiah Brown	(England) Luton Town	Free	
21 August 2019	4 August 2020	21	DF	(Italy) Davide Zappacosta	(Italy) Roma	Free	
30 August 2019	30 June 2020	42	DF	(Netherlands) Juan Castillo	(Netherlands) Ajax	Free	
31 August 2019	30 June 2020	14	MF	(France) Tiémoué Bakayoko	(France) Monaco	£2,700,000	
1 September 2019	31 January 2020		MF	(Serbia) Danilo Pantić	(Hungary) Fehérvár	Undisclosed	
2 September 2019	30 June 2020		DF	(Ghana) Baba Rahman	(Spain) Mallorca	Free	
2 September 2019	30 June 2020	16	MF	(Brazil) Kenedy	(Spain) Getafe	Free	
2 September 2019	30 June 2021		MF	(Brazil) Lucas Piazon	(Portugal) Rio Ave	Free	
3 September 2019	16 January 2020	32	GK	(England) Jamal Blackman	(Netherlands) Vitesse	Free	

==== Winter ====
Date	Until	No.	Pos.	Player	To	Fee	Source
7 January 2020	30 June 2020		MF	(England) Danny Drinkwater	(England) Aston Villa	Free	
10 January 2020	31 July 2020	44	DF	(England) Marc Guehi	(Wales) Swansea City	Free	
15 January 2020	31 July 2020		MF	(England) Conor Gallagher	(Wales) Swansea City	Free	
22 January 2020	31 May 2020		GK	(England) Jamal Blackman	(England) Bristol Rovers	Free	
23 January 2020	31 August 2020		MF	(Nigeria) Victor Moses	(Italy) Inter Milan	£190,000	
30 January 2020	30 June 2020	45	MF	(England) George McEachran	(Netherlands) Cambuur	Free	
31 January 2020	30 June 2020	41	FW	(England) Charlie Brown	(Belgium) Union SG	Free	
2 February 2020	31 July 2020		MF	(England) Jacob Maddox	(England) Southampton	Free	

=== Overall transfer activity ===
==== Expenditure ====
Summer: ▼£40,500,000

Winter: ▼£580,000

Total: ▼£41,080,000

==== Income ====
Summer: ▲£150,800,000

Winter: ▲£8,830,000

Total: ▲£159,630,000

==== Net totals ====
Summer: ▲£110,300,000

Winter: ▲£8,250,000

Total: ▲£118,550,000

== Friendlies ==
10 July 2019	Bohemians	1–1	Chelsea	Dublin, Republic of Ireland
19:45 IST	Molloy 89'	Report	Batshuayi 8'	Stadium: Dalymount Park; Attendance: 3,800; Referee: Neil Doyle (Republic of Ireland)

13 July 2019	St Patrick's Athletic	0–4	Chelsea	Dublin, Republic of Ireland
14:00 IST		Report	Mount 14'; Emerson 31'; Giroud 67', 88'; Christensen (yellow card) 81'	Stadium: Richmond Park; Attendance: 5,340; Referee: Paul McLaughlin (Republic of Ireland)

19 July 2019 J.League World Challenge	Kawasaki Frontale	1–0	Chelsea	Yokohama, Japan
19:00 JST	Damião 86'	Report		Stadium: Nissan; Attendance: 61,012; Referee: Yuichi Nishimura (Japan)

23 July 2019	Barcelona	1–2	Chelsea	Saitama, Japan
19:30 JST	Rakitić 90+1'	Report	Abraham 34'; Barkley 81'	Stadium: Saitama; Attendance: 51,126; Referee: Masaaki Iemoto (Japan)

28 July 2019	Reading	3–4	Chelsea	Reading, England
15:00 BST	Barrett 13'; Morrison 49'; Baldock 71'	Report	Barkley 22'; Kenedy 42'; Mount 57', 60'	Stadium: Madejski; Attendance: 19,463; Referee: Tim Robinson (England)

31 July 2019	Red Bull Salzburg	3–5	Chelsea	Salzburg, Austria
20:00 CEST	Onguéné 50'; Minamino (yellow card) 79', (goal) 85' (pen.), 90+2'	Report	Pulisic 20', 28'; Barkley 23' (pen.); Zouma (yellow card) 41'; Pedro 57'; Batshuayi 88'	Stadium: Red Bull Arena; Attendance: 27,643; Referee: Christopher Jäger (Austria)

3 August 2019	Borussia Mönchengladbach	2–2	Chelsea	Mönchengladbach, Germany
17:00 CEST	Pléa 13'; Lainer (yellow card) 28'; Hofmann 39'; Elvedi (yellow card) 62'	Report	Emerson (yellow card) 8'; Kovačić (yellow card) 24'; Abraham 59' (pen.); Pedro (yellow card) 68'; Giroud (yellow card) 71'; Barkley 86' (pen.)	Stadium: Borussia-Park; Attendance: 24,500; Referee: Martin Thomsen (Germany)

10 June 2020	Chelsea	1–0	Reading	Surrey, England
BST	Pedro 28'	Report		Stadium: Cobham Training Centre; Attendance: 0

14 June 2020	Chelsea	7–1	Queens Park Rangers	London, England
BST	Mount 6'; Willian 29'; Loftus-Cheek 34', 58'; Giroud 67'; Gilmour 79', 88'	Report	Amos 90+2'	Stadium: Stamford Bridge; Attendance: 0

== Competitions ==
=== Premier League ===
==== League table ====
Pos	Team	Pld	W	D	L	GF	GA	GD	Pts	Qualification or relegation
2	Manchester City	38	26	3	9	102	35	+67	81	Qualification for the Champions League group stage
3	Manchester United	38	18	12	8	66	36	+30	66	Qualification for the Champions League group stage
4	Chelsea	38	20	6	12	69	54	+15	66	Qualification for the Champions League group stage
5	Leicester City	38	18	8	12	67	41	+26	62	Qualification for the Europa League group stage
6	Tottenham Hotspur	38	16	11	11	61	47	+14	59	Qualification for the Europa League second qualifying round (Note: Since the winners of the 2019–20 EFL Cup, Manchester City, qualified for the Champions League group stage by league position, the spot given to the EFL Cup winners (Europa League second qualifying round) was passed down to the sixth-placed team.)

Source: Premier League
Rules for classification: 1) Points; 2) Goal difference; 3) Goals scored; 4) If the champions, relegated teams or qualified teams for UEFA competitions cannot be determined by rules 1 to 3, rules 4.1 to 4.3 are applied – 4.1) Points gained in head to head record between such teams; 4.2) Away goals scored in head to head record between such teams; 4.3) Play-offs

==== Results summary ====
Overall								Home						Away					
Pld	W	D	L	GF	GA	GD	Pts	W	D	L	GF	GA	GD	W	D	L	GF	GA	GD
38	20	6	12	69	54	+15	66	11	3	5	30	16	+14	9	3	7	39	38	+1

Source: Premier League

==== Results by matchday ====
Matchday	1	2	3	4	5	6	7	8	9	10	11	12	13	14	15	16	17	18	19	20	21	22	23	24	25	26	27	28	29	30	31	32	33	34	35	36	37	38
Ground	A	H	A	H	A	H	H	A	H	A	A	H	A	H	H	A	H	A	H	A	A	H	A	H	A	H	H	A	H	A	H	A	H	A	A	H	A	H
Result	L	D	W	D	W	L	W	W	W	W	W	W	L	L	W	L	L	W	L	W	D	W	L	D	D	L	W	D	W	W	W	L	W	W	L	W	L	W
Position	19	15	13	11	6	11	7	5	4	4	4	3	4	4	4	4	4	4	4	4	4	4	4	4	4	4	4	4	4	4	4	4	4	3	3	3	4	4

Source: Premier League
A = Away; H = Home; W = Win; D = Draw; L = Loss; P = Postponed

==== Score overview ====
Win Draw Loss

Opposition	Home score	Away score	Aggregate score	Double
Arsenal	2–2	2–1	4–3	No
Aston Villa	2–1	2–1	4–2	Yes
Bournemouth	0–1	2–2	2–3	No
Brighton	2–0	1–1	3–1	No
Burnley	3–0	4–2	7–2	Yes
Crystal Palace	2–0	3–2	5–2	Yes
Everton	4–0	1–3	5–3	No
Leicester City	1–1	2–2	3–3	No
Liverpool	1–2	3–5	4–7	No
Manchester City	2–1	1–2	3–3	No
Manchester United	0–2	0–4	0–6	No
Newcastle United	1–0	0–1	1–1	No
Norwich City	1–0	3–2	4–2	Yes
Sheffield United	2–2	0–3	2–5	No
Southampton	0–2	4–1	4–3	No
Tottenham Hotspur	2–1	2–0	4–1	Yes
Watford	3–0	2–1	5–1	Yes
West Ham United	0–1	2–3	2–4	No
Wolves	2–0	5–2	7–2	Yes

==== Matches ====
11 August 2019 1	Manchester United	4–0	Chelsea	Manchester
16:30 BST	Rashford 18' (pen.), 67'; Lingard (yellow card) 48'; Martial 65', (yellow card) 80'; Lindelöf (yellow card) 69'; James 81'	Report	Zouma (yellow card) 36'; Jorginho (yellow card) 52'; Abraham (yellow card) 57'; Kanté (yellow card) 90'	Stadium: Old Trafford; Attendance: 73,620; Referee: Anthony Taylor

18 August 2019 2	Chelsea	1–1	Leicester City	London
16:30 BST	Mount 7'; Jorginho (yellow card) 37'	Report	Ndidi 67'	Stadium: Stamford Bridge; Attendance: 40,629; Referee: Oliver Langford

24 August 2019 3	Norwich City	2–3	Chelsea	Norwich
12:30 BST	Cantwell 6'; Pukki 30'; Stiepermann (yellow card) 43'	Report	Abraham 3', 68'; Mount 17'; Jorginho (yellow card) 33'	Stadium: Carrow Road; Attendance: 27,032; Referee: Martin Atkinson

31 August 2019 4	Chelsea	2–2	Sheffield United	London
15:00 BST	Abraham 19', 43'	Report	McBurnie (yellow card) 45+1'; Robinson 46'; Zouma 89' (o.g.)	Stadium: Stamford Bridge; Attendance: 40,560; Referee: Stuart Attwell

14 September 2019 5	Wolverhampton Wanderers	2–5	Chelsea	Wolverhampton
15:00 BST	Abraham 69' (o.g.); Saïss (yellow card) 79'; Cutrone 85'	Report	Tomori 31'; Abraham 34', 41', 55', (yellow card) 62'; Christensen (yellow card) 64'; Mount 90+6'	Stadium: Molineux; Attendance: 31,534; Referee: Graham Scott

22 September 2019 6	Chelsea	1–2	Liverpool	London
16:30 BST	Tomori (yellow card) 20'; Kanté 71'; Kovačić (yellow card) 84'; Alonso (yellow card) 90+4'	Report	Alexander-Arnold 14', (yellow card) 57'; Firmino 30'; Fabinho (yellow card) 78'; Milner (yellow card) 86'	Stadium: Stamford Bridge; Attendance: 40,638; Referee: Michael Oliver

28 September 2019 7	Chelsea	2–0	Brighton & Hove Albion	London
15:00 BST	Christensen (yellow card) 23'; Alonso (yellow card) 31'; Jorginho 50' (pen.); Willian 76'	Report	Maupay (yellow card) 28'; Alzate (yellow card) 33'; Webster (yellow card) 49'	Stadium: Stamford Bridge; Attendance: 40,683; Referee: Chris Kavanagh

6 October 2019 8	Southampton	1–4	Chelsea	Southampton
14:00 BST	Ings 30'	Report	Jorginho (yellow card) 12'; Abraham 17'; Mount 24'; Kanté 40'; Batshuayi 89'	Stadium: St. Mary's; Attendance: 31,473; Referee: Paul Tierney

19 October 2019 9	Chelsea	1–0	Newcastle United	London
15:00 BST	Alonso (yellow card) 23', (goal) 73'; Tomori (yellow card) 45+1'	Report	Clark (yellow card) 43'	Stadium: Stamford Bridge; Attendance: 40,513; Referee: Andre Marriner

26 October 2019 10	Burnley	2–4	Chelsea	Burnley
17:30 BST	Hendrick (yellow card) 65'; Pieters (yellow card) 67'; Rodriguez 86'; McNeil 89'; Brady (yellow card) 90+2'	Report	Pulisic 21', 45', 56'; Willian (yellow card) 53', (goal) 58'; Hudson-Odoi (yellow card) 77'	Stadium: Turf Moor; Attendance: 20,975; Referee: Michael Oliver

2 November 2019 11	Watford	1–2	Chelsea	Watford
17:30 GMT	Kabasele (yellow card) 46'; Janmaat (yellow card) 70'; Deulofeu 80' (pen.); Dawson (yellow card) 82'; Mariappa (yellow card) 88'	Report	Abraham 5'; Pulisic 55'; Jorginho (yellow card) 89'; Mount (yellow card) 90+6'	Stadium: Vicarage Road; Attendance: 21,011; Referee: Anthony Taylor

9 November 2019 12	Chelsea	2–0	Crystal Palace	London
12:30 GMT	Willian (yellow card) 17'; Emerson (yellow card) 31'; Kovačić (yellow card) 33'; Abraham 52'; Pulisic 79'	Report	Zaha (yellow card) 21'; McCarthy (yellow card) 90+3'	Stadium: Stamford Bridge; Attendance: 40,525; Referee: Mike Dean

23 November 2019 13	Manchester City	2–1	Chelsea	Manchester
17:30 GMT	De Bruyne 29'; Mahrez 37'; Gündoğan (yellow card) 90+1'	Report	Kanté 21'; Jorginho (yellow card) 61'	Stadium: Etihad; Attendance: 54,486; Referee: Martin Atkinson

30 November 2019 14	Chelsea	0–1	West Ham United	London
15:00 GMT		Report	Cresswell 48', (yellow card) 90+5'; Fornals (yellow card) 65'; Yarmolenko (yellow card) 88'	Stadium: Stamford Bridge; Attendance: 40,595; Referee: Jonathan Moss

4 December 2019 15	Chelsea	2–1	Aston Villa	London
19:30 GMT	Abraham 24'; Mount (yellow card) 45', (goal) 48'; Kovačić (yellow card) 81'	Report	Trézéguet 41'; Targett (yellow card) 64'	Stadium: Stamford Bridge; Attendance: 40,628; Referee: Chris Kavanagh

7 December 2019 16	Everton	3–1	Chelsea	Liverpool
12:30 GMT	Richarlison 5', (yellow card) 42'; Digne (yellow card) 30'; Calvert-Lewin 49', 84', (yellow card) 68'	Report	Kovačić 52'	Stadium: Goodison Park; Attendance: 39,114; Referee: Craig Pawson

14 December 2019 17	Chelsea	0–1	Bournemouth	London
15:00 GMT	Kovačić (yellow card) 81'	Report	L. Cook (yellow card) 50'; Gosling (yellow card) 82', (goal) 84'	Stadium: Stamford Bridge; Attendance: 40,243; Referee: Graham Scott

22 December 2019 18	Tottenham Hotspur	0–2	Chelsea	London
16:30 GMT	Alli (yellow card) 43'; Gazzaniga (yellow card) 45+3'; Sissoko (yellow card) 58'; Son (red card) 62'; Alderweireld (yellow card) 67'	Report	Willian 12', 45+4' (pen.); Zouma (yellow card) 31'; Kovačić (yellow card) 43'; Rüdiger (yellow card) 78'	Stadium: Tottenham Hotspur; Attendance: 61,104; Referee: Anthony Taylor

26 December 2019 19	Chelsea	0–2	Southampton	London
15:00 GMT	Jorginho (yellow card) 58'; Kanté (yellow card) 62'; Tomori (yellow card) 62'	Report	Bertrand (yellow card) 30'; Obafemi 31'; Redmond 73'; Boufal (yellow card) 90+4'	Stadium: Stamford Bridge; Attendance: 40,651; Referee: Jonathan Moss

29 December 2019 20	Arsenal	1–2	Chelsea	London
14:00 GMT	Guendouzi (yellow card) 10'; Aubameyang 13'; David Luiz (yellow card) 47'; Torreira (yellow card) 73'; Lacazette (yellow card) 77'; Maitland-Niles (yellow card) 90+1'	Report	Mount (yellow card) 30'; Kanté (yellow card) 30'; Rüdiger (yellow card) 34'; Jorginho (yellow card) 55', (goal) 83'; Abraham 87'	Stadium: Emirates; Attendance: 60,309; Referee: Craig Pawson

1 January 2020 21	Brighton & Hove Albion	1–1	Chelsea	Falmer
12:30 GMT	Dunk (yellow card) 71'; Jahanbakhsh 84'; Maupay (yellow card) 90+1'	Report	Azpilicueta 10'; Zouma (yellow card) 69'; Kovačić (yellow card) 82'; James (yellow card) 90+4'	Stadium: Amex; Attendance: 30,559; Referee: Stuart Attwell

11 January 2020 22	Chelsea	3–0	Burnley	London
15:00 GMT	Jorginho 27' (pen.); Abraham 38'; Hudson-Odoi 49'	Report	McNeil (yellow card) 45+2'; Westwood (yellow card) 54'; Lennon (yellow card) 59'	Stadium: Stamford Bridge; Attendance: 40,396; Referee: Kevin Friend

18 January 2020 23	Newcastle United	1–0	Chelsea	Newcastle
17:30 GMT	Hayden (yellow card) 55', (goal) 90+4'	Report	Emerson (yellow card) 84'	Stadium: St James' Park; Attendance: 52,217; Referee: Chris Kavanagh

21 January 2020 24	Chelsea	2–2	Arsenal	London
20:15 GMT	Emerson (yellow card) 21'; Jorginho 28' (pen.); Christensen (yellow card) 59'; Azpilicueta 84'	Report	David Luiz (red card) 26'; Martinelli 63'; Guendouzi (yellow card) 76'; Bellerín 87'	Stadium: Stamford Bridge; Attendance: 40,577; Referee: Stuart Attwell

1 February 2020 25	Leicester City	2–2	Chelsea	Leicester
12:30 GMT	Barnes 54'; Maddison (yellow card) 61'; Chilwell 64'; Evans (yellow card) 90+3'	Report	Rüdiger 46', 71'; Jorginho (yellow card) 56'; Kovačić (yellow card) 76'	Stadium: King Power; Attendance: 32,186; Referee: Lee Mason

17 February 2020 26	Chelsea	0–2	Manchester United	London
20:00 GMT	Willian (yellow card) 35'; Rüdiger (yellow card) 48'; Zouma (yellow card) 59'; Pedro (yellow card) 64'	Report	Martial 45'; Fred (yellow card) 59'; Maguire 66'; Williams (yellow card) 76'; Wan-Bissaka (yellow card) 79'	Stadium: Stamford Bridge; Attendance: 40,504; Referee: Anthony Taylor

22 February 2020 27	Chelsea	2–1	Tottenham Hotspur	London
12:30 GMT	Giroud 15'; Alonso 48'; Christensen (yellow card) 65'	Report	Winks (yellow card) 23'; Lo Celso (yellow card) 81'; Rüdiger 89' (o.g.)	Stadium: Stamford Bridge; Attendance: 40,608; Referee: Michael Oliver

29 February 2020 28	Bournemouth	2–2	Chelsea	Bournemouth
15:00 GMT	Lerma 54'; King 57'; Smith (yellow card) 59'; C. Wilson (yellow card) 88'	Report	Jorginho (yellow card) 17'; Alonso 33', 85'; Christensen (yellow card) 71'	Stadium: Vitality; Attendance: 10,667; Referee: Andre Marriner

8 March 2020 29	Chelsea	4–0	Everton	London
14:00 GMT	Mount 14'; Pedro 21'; Willian 51'; Giroud 54'; Zouma (yellow card) 82'	Report	Gomes (yellow card) 53'; Holgate (yellow card) 90+1'	Stadium: Stamford Bridge; Attendance: 40,694; Referee: Kevin Friend

21 June 2020 30	Aston Villa	1–2	Chelsea	Birmingham
16:15 BST	Hause 43'; Konsa (yellow card) 45'; Grealish (yellow card) 90+6'	Report	Pulisic 60'; Giroud 62'; Kanté (yellow card) 90+4'	Stadium: Villa Park; Attendance: 0 Referee: Paul Tierney

25 June 2020 31	Chelsea	2–1	Manchester City	London
20:15 BST	Pulisic 36'; Alonso (yellow card) 38'; Willian 78' (pen.)	Report	De Bruyne 55', (yellow card) 76'; Fernandinho (red card) 77'	Stadium: Stamford Bridge; Attendance: 0 Referee: Stuart Attwell

1 July 2020 32	West Ham United	3–2	Chelsea	London
20:15 BST	Souček 45+2'; Antonio 51'; Lanzini (yellow card) 65'; Rice (yellow card) 70'; Yarmolenko 89'	Report	Willian 42' (pen.), 72', (yellow card) 82'	Stadium: London; Attendance: 0 Referee: Martin Atkinson

4 July 2020 33	Chelsea	3–0	Watford	London
20:00 BST	Giroud 28'; Willian 43' (pen.); Barkley 90+2'	Report	Capoue (yellow card) 21'; Mariappa (yellow card) 49'	Stadium: Stamford Bridge; Attendance: 0 Referee: Kevin Friend

7 July 2020 34	Crystal Palace	2–3	Chelsea	London
18:00 BST	Zaha 34'; Milivojević (yellow card) 35'; Benteke 72'	Report	Giroud 6'; Pulisic 27'; Abraham 71'	Stadium: Selhurst Park; Attendance: 0 Referee: David Coote

11 July 2020 35	Sheffield United	3–0	Chelsea	Sheffield
17:30 BST	Baldock (yellow card) 3'; McGoldrick 18', 77'; McBurnie 33'	Report		Stadium: Bramall Lane; Attendance: 0 Referee: Andre Marriner

14 July 2020 36	Chelsea	1–0	Norwich City	London
20:15 BST	Giroud 45+3'; Zouma (yellow card) 60'; Kovačić (yellow card) 62'	Report	Cantwell (yellow card) 58'; Buendía (yellow card) 88'	Stadium: Stamford Bridge; Attendance: 0 Referee: Jonathan Moss

22 July 2020 37	Liverpool	5–3	Chelsea	Liverpool
20:15 BST	Keïta 23'; Alexander-Arnold 38'; Wijnaldum 43'; Firmino 54'; Gomez (yellow card) 83'; Oxlade-Chamberlain 84'	Report	Giroud 45+3'; Abraham 61'; Pulisic 73'	Stadium: Anfield; Attendance: 0 Referee: Andre Marriner

26 July 2020 38	Chelsea	2–0	Wolverhampton Wanderers	London
16:00 BST	Mount 45+1'; Giroud (yellow card) 45+3', (goal) 45+4'; Azpilicueta (yellow card) 90+2'	Report	Jota (yellow card) 22'; Neto (yellow card) 45+1'; Dendoncker (yellow card) 83'	Stadium: Stamford Bridge; Attendance: 0 Referee: Stuart Attwell

=== FA Cup ===
5 January 2020 Third round	Chelsea	2–0	Nottingham Forest	London
14:01 GMT	Hudson-Odoi 6'; Barkley 33'; James (yellow card) 65'	Report	Yates (yellow card) 77'	Stadium: Stamford Bridge; Attendance: 40,492; Referee: Peter Bankes

25 January 2020 Fourth round	Hull City	1–2	Chelsea	Hull
17:30 GMT	Lichaj (yellow card) 63'; Grosicki 78'	Report	Batshuayi 6'; Kovačić (yellow card) 46'; Tomori 64'; Zouma (yellow card) 90'	Stadium: KCOM; Attendance: 24,109; Referee: Craig Pawson

3 March 2020 Fifth round	Chelsea	2–0	Liverpool	London
19:45 GMT	Willian 13'; Barkley 64'	Report	Fabinho (yellow card) 61'; Milner (yellow card) 76'; Mané (yellow card) 90+4'	Stadium: Stamford Bridge; Attendance: 40,103; Referee: Chris Kavanagh

28 June 2020 Quarter-finals	Leicester City	0–1	Chelsea	Leicester
16:00 BST	Söyüncü (yellow card) 23'	Report	Barkley 63'	Stadium: King Power; Attendance: 0 Referee: Mike Dean

19 July 2020 Semi-finals	Manchester United	1–3	Chelsea	London
18:00 BST	Pogba (yellow card) 71'; Fernandes 85' (pen.)	Report	Giroud 45+11'; Mount 46'; Maguire 74' (o.g.)	Stadium: Wembley; Attendance: 0 Referee: Mike Dean

1 August 2020 Final	Arsenal	2–1	Chelsea	London
17:30 BST	Aubameyang 28' (pen.), 67'; Ceballos (yellow card) 73'	Report	Pulisic 5'; Kovačić (yellow card) 14' (yellow-red card) 73'; Azpilicueta (yellow card) 26'; Mount (yellow card) 45+4'; Rüdiger (yellow card) 75'; Barkley (yellow card) 89'	Stadium: Wembley; Attendance: 0 Referee: Anthony Taylor

=== EFL Cup ===
25 September 2019 Third round	Chelsea	7–1	Grimsby Town	London
19:45 BST	Barkley 4'; Batshuayi 7', 86'; Pedro 43' (pen.); Zouma 56'; James 82'; Hudson-Odoi 89'	Report	Green 19', (yellow card) 28'	Stadium: Stamford Bridge; Attendance: 39,674; Referee: Keith Stroud

30 October 2019 Fourth round	Chelsea	1–2	Manchester United	London
20:05 GMT	Batshuayi (yellow card) 18', (goal) 61'; Kovačić (yellow card) 90'	Report	McTominay (yellow card) 11'; Rashford 25' (pen.), 73'; Fred (yellow card) 83'	Stadium: Stamford Bridge; Attendance: 38,645; Referee: Paul Tierney

=== UEFA Champions League ===
==== Group stage ====
Tables

Group H
Pos	Team	Pld	W	D	L	GF	GA	GD	Pts	Qualification
1	(Spain) Valencia	6	3	2	1	9	7	+2	11 (Note: Head-to-head points: Valencia 4, Chelsea 1.)	Advance to knockout phase
2	(England) Chelsea	6	3	2	1	11	9	+2	11	Advance to knockout phase
3	(Netherlands) Ajax	6	3	1	2	12	6	+6	10	Transfer to Europa League
4	(France) Lille	6	0	1	5	4	14	−10	1	

Source: UEFA
Rules for classification: Group stage tiebreakers
Notes:

Matches

17 September 2019 1	Chelsea (England)	0–1	(Spain) Valencia	London, England
20:00 BST	Jorginho (yellow card) 33'; Giroud (yellow card) 90'	Report	Coquelin (yellow card) 9'; Rodrigo 74'	Stadium: Stamford Bridge; Attendance: 39,469; Referee: Cüneyt Çakır (Turkey)

2 October 2019 2	Lille (France)	1–2	(England) Chelsea	Lille, France
21:00 CEST	Osimhen 33'; Ikoné (yellow card) 44'	Report	Abraham 22'; James (yellow card) 35'; Willian 78'	Stadium: Stade Pierre Mauroy; Attendance: 48,523; Referee: Aleksei Kulbakov (Belarus)

23 October 2019 3	Ajax (Netherlands)	0–1	(England) Chelsea	Amsterdam, Netherlands
18:55 CEST	Tadić (yellow card) 49'; Martínez (yellow card) 65'	Report	Zouma (yellow card) 84'; Batshuayi 86'	Stadium: Johan Cruyff Arena; Attendance: 52,482; Referee: Ovidiu Hațegan (Romania)

5 November 2019 4	Chelsea (England)	4–4	(Netherlands) Ajax	London, England
20:00 GMT	Jorginho 5' (pen.), 71' (pen.); Tomori (yellow card) 42'; Azpilicueta (yellow card) 45', (goal) 63'; James 74'	Report	Abraham 2' (o.g.); Promes 20', (yellow card) 62'; Veltman (yellow card) 31' (yellow-red card) 69'; Blind (yellow card) 33' (yellow-red card) 68'; Arrizabalaga 35' (o.g.); Van de Beek 55'	Stadium: Stamford Bridge; Attendance: 39,132; Referee: Gianluca Rocchi (Italy)

27 November 2019 5	Valencia (Spain)	2–2	(England) Chelsea	Valencia, Spain
18:55 CET	Wass (yellow card) 32', (goal) 82'; Soler 40'; Garay (yellow card) 53'; Gabriel (yellow card) 87'	Report	Jorginho (yellow card) 7'; Kovačić 41'; Pulisic 50'; Azpilicueta (yellow card) 55'; Kanté (yellow card) 73'; Arrizabalaga (yellow card) 78'	Stadium: Mestalla; Attendance: 43,486; Referee: Felix Zwayer (Germany)

10 December 2019 6	Chelsea (England)	2–1	(France) Lille	London, England
20:00 GMT	Abraham 19'; Azpilicueta 35'; Zouma (yellow card) 45+1'	Report	Çelik (yellow card) 40'; Xeka (yellow card) 67'; Rémy 78'	Stadium: Stamford Bridge; Attendance: 40,016; Referee: Anastasios Sidiropoulos (Greece)

==== Knockout phase ====
===== Round of 16 =====
25 February 2020 Round of 16 first leg	Chelsea (England)	0–3	(Germany) Bayern Munich	London, England
20:00 GMT	Jorginho (yellow card) 49'; Alonso (red card) 83'	Report	Thiago (yellow card) 45+1'; Kimmich (yellow card) 50'; Gnabry 51', 54'; Lewandowski 76'	Stadium: Stamford Bridge; Attendance: 36,761; Referee: Clément Turpin (France)

8 August 2020 Round of 16 second leg	Bayern Munich (Germany)	4–1 (7–1 agg.)	(England) Chelsea	Munich, Germany
21:00 CEST	Lewandowski 10' (pen.), 84'; Perišić 24'; Tolisso 76'	Report	Caballero (yellow card) 8'; Emerson (yellow card) 43'; Abraham 44'	Stadium: Allianz Arena; Attendance: 0 Referee: Ovidiu Hațegan (Romania)

=== UEFA Super Cup ===
14 August 2019	Liverpool (England)	2–2 (a.e.t.) (5–4 p)	(England) Chelsea	Istanbul, Turkey
22:00 TRT	Mané 48', 95'; Henderson (yellow card) 85'; Alexander-Arnold (yellow card) 107'	Report	Giroud 36'; Azpilicueta (yellow card) 79'; Jorginho 101' (pen.)	Stadium: Vodafone Park; Attendance: 38,434; Referee: Stéphanie Frappart (France)
	Penalties
	Firmino (penalty scored); Fabinho (penalty scored); Origi (penalty scored); Alexander-Arnold (penalty scored); Salah (penalty scored)		(penalty scored) Jorginho; (penalty scored) Barkley; (penalty scored) Mount; (penalty scored) Emerson; (penalty missed) Abraham

== Statistics ==
=== Appearances and goals ===
No.	Pos.	Player	Premier League		FA Cup		EFL Cup		UEFA Champions League		UEFA Super Cup		Total	
No.	Pos.	Player	Apps	Goals	Apps	Goals	Apps	Goals	Apps	Goals	Apps	Goals	Apps	Goals
1	GK	(Spain) Kepa Arrizabalaga	33	0	1	0	0	0	6	0	1	0	41	0
2	DF	(Germany) Antonio Rüdiger	19 (1)	2	4	0	0	0	2	0	0	0	25 (1)	2
3	DF	(Spain) Marcos Alonso	15 (3)	4	4	0	2	0	5	0	0	0	26 (3)	4
4	DF	(Denmark) Andreas Christensen	21	0	1 (1)	0	0	0	4	0	1	0	27 (1)	0
5	MF	(Italy) Jorginho	27 (4)	4	3 (1)	0	1	0	7	2	1	1	39 (5)	7
7	MF	(France) N'Golo Kanté	20 (2)	3	1	0	0	0	4	0	1	0	26 (2)	3
8	MF	(England) Ross Barkley	13 (8)	1	3 (2)	3	1	1	2 (1)	0	0 (1)	0	19 (12)	5
9	FW	(England) Tammy Abraham	25 (9)	15	1 (2)	0	0 (1)	0	7 (1)	3	0 (1)	0	33 (14)	18
10	MF	(Brazil) Willian	29 (7)	9	3 (1)	1	0	0	6 (1)	1	0	0	38 (9)	11
11	MF	(Spain) Pedro	8 (3)	1	3 (3)	0	1 (1)	1	0 (3)	0	1	0	13 (10)	2
12	MF	(England) Ruben Loftus-Cheek	2 (5)	0	0 (2)	0	0	0	0	0	0	0	2 (7)	0
13	GK	(Argentina) Willy Caballero	5	0	5	0	2	0	2	0	0	0	14	0
15	DF	(France) Kurt Zouma	25 (3)	0	5	0	2	1	7	0	1	0	40 (3)	1
17	MF	(Croatia) Mateo Kovačić	23 (8)	1	5 (1)	0	1	0	7 (1)	1	1	0	37 (10)	2
18	FW	(France) Olivier Giroud	12 (6)	8	3	1	0	0	1 (2)	0	1	1	17 (8)	10
19	MF	(England) Mason Mount	32 (5)	7	4 (2)	1	0 (1)	0	6 (2)	0	0 (1)	0	42 (11)	8
20	MF	(England) Callum Hudson-Odoi	7 (15)	1	2 (2)	1	2	1	2 (3)	0	0	0	13 (20)	3
22	MF	(United States) Christian Pulisic	19 (6)	9	2	1	2	0	3 (1)	1	1	0	27 (7)	11
23	FW	(Belgium) Michy Batshuayi	1 (15)	1	2	1	2	3	0 (4)	1	0	0	5 (19)	6
24	DF	(England) Reece James	16 (8)	0	4 (1)	0	2	1	4 (2)	1	0	0	26 (11)	2
28	DF	(Spain) César Azpilicueta	36	2	4 (1)	0	0	0	7	2	1	0	48 (1)	4
29	DF	(England) Fikayo Tomori	15	1	2	1	0	0	4	0	0 (1)	0	21 (1)	2
31	GK	(England) Jamie Cumming	0	0	0	0	0	0	0	0	0	0	0	0
33	DF	(Italy) Emerson	13 (2)	0	2	0	0	0	2 (1)	0	1	0	18 (3)	0
47	MF	(Scotland) Billy Gilmour	2 (4)	0	2 (1)	0	2	0	0	0	0	0	6 (5)	0
55	MF	(England) Tino Anjorin	0 (1)	0	0	0	0 (1)	0	0	0	0	0	0 (2)	0
57	FW	(Albania) Armando Broja	0 (1)	0	0	0	0	0	0	0	0	0	0 (1)	0
61	DF	(England) Henry Lawrence	0	0	0	0	0	0	0	0	0	0	0	0
63	DF	(Netherlands) Ian Maatsen	0	0	0	0	0 (1)	0	0	0	0	0	0 (1)	0
64	MF	(England) Lewis Bate	0	0	0	0	0	0	0	0	0	0	0	0
66	DF	(England) Dynel Simeu	0	0	0	0	0	0	0	0	0	0	0	0
Players have left the club
21	DF	(Italy) Davide Zappacosta	0	0	0	0	0	0	0	0	0	0	0	0
16	MF	(Brazil) Kenedy	0	0	0	0	0	0	0	0	0	0	0	0
44	DF	(England) Marc Guehi	0	0	0	0	2	0	0	0	0	0	2	0
48	DF	(England) Tariq Lamptey	0 (1)	0	0 (2)	0	0	0	0	0	0	0	0 (3)	0

Last updated: 8 August 2020.
Source: FBref.com

=== Top scorers ===
Rank	No.	Pos.	Player	Premier League	FA Cup	EFL Cup	UEFA Champions League	UEFA Super Cup	Total
1	9	FW	(England) Tammy Abraham	15	0	0	3	0	18
2	10	MF	(Brazil) Willian	9	1	0	1	0	11
2	22	MF	(United States) Christian Pulisic	9	1	0	1	0	11
4	18	FW	(France) Olivier Giroud	8	1	0	0	1	10
5	19	MF	(England) Mason Mount	7	1	0	0	0	8
6	5	MF	(Italy) Jorginho	4	0	0	2	1	7
7	23	FW	(Belgium) Michy Batshuayi	1	1	3	1	0	6
8	8	MF	(England) Ross Barkley	1	3	1	0	0	5
9	3	DF	(Spain) Marcos Alonso	4	0	0	0	0	4
9	28	DF	(Spain) César Azpilicueta	2	0	0	2	0	4
11	7	MF	(France) N'Golo Kanté	3	0	0	0	0	3
11	20	MF	(England) Callum Hudson-Odoi	1	1	1	0	0	3
13	2	DF	(Germany) Antonio Rüdiger	2	0	0	0	0	2
13	11	MF	(Spain) Pedro	1	0	1	0	0	2
13	17	MF	(Croatia) Mateo Kovačić	1	0	0	1	0	2
13	24	DF	(England) Reece James	0	0	1	1	0	2
13	29	DF	(England) Fikayo Tomori	1	1	0	0	0	2
18	15	DF	(France) Kurt Zouma	0	0	1	0	0	1
Own goals				0	1	0	0	0	1
Total				69	11	8	12	2	102

Last updated: 8 August 2020.
Source: FBref.com

=== Top assists ===
Rank	No.	Pos.	Player	Premier League	FA Cup	EFL Cup	UEFA Champions League	UEFA Super Cup	Total
1	10	MF	(Brazil) Willian	7	1	0	1	0	9
2	22	MF	(United States) Christian Pulisic	4	0	1	1	1	7
2	28	DF	(Spain) César Azpilicueta	6	1	0	0	0	7
4	20	MF	(England) Callum Hudson-Odoi	5	0	0	1	0	6
5	8	MF	(England) Ross Barkley	4	1	0	0	0	5
5	19	MF	(England) Mason Mount	5	0	0	0	0	5
7	9	FW	(England) Tammy Abraham	3	0	0	1	0	4
8	11	MF	(Spain) Pedro	1	1	1	0	0	3
8	17	MF	(Croatia) Mateo Kovačić	3	0	0	0	0	3
8	24	DF	(England) Reece James	2	0	1	0	0	3
11	3	DF	(Spain) Marcos Alonso	2	0	0	0	0	2
11	5	MF	(Italy) Jorginho	2	0	0	0	0	2
11	23	FW	(Belgium) Michy Batshuayi	1	0	1	0	0	2
14	12	MF	(England) Ruben Loftus-Cheek	1	0	0	0	0	1
14	15	DF	(France) Kurt Zouma	0	0	0	1	0	1
14	18	FW	(France) Olivier Giroud	0	1	0	0	0	1
14	29	DF	(England) Fikayo Tomori	0	0	0	1	0	1
14	33	DF	(Italy) Emerson	0	0	0	1	0	1
Total				46	5	4	7	1	63

Last updated: 8 August 2020.
Source: FBref.com

=== Clean sheets ===
Rank	No.	Pos.	Player	Premier League	FA Cup	EFL Cup	UEFA Champions League	UEFA Super Cup	Total
1	1	GK	(Spain) Kepa Arrizabalaga	8	1	0	1	0	10
2	13	GK	(Argentina) Willy Caballero	1	2	0	0	0	3
Total				9	3	0	1	0	13

Last updated: 8 August 2020.
Source: FBref.com

=== Discipline ===
No.	Pos.	Player	Premier League			FA Cup			EFL Cup			UEFA Champions League			UEFA Super Cup			Total		
No.	Pos.	Player	Booked	(yellow card) (yellow-red card)	Sent off (straight red)	Booked	(yellow card) (yellow-red card)	Sent off (straight red)	Booked	(yellow card) (yellow-red card)	Sent off (straight red)	Booked	(yellow card) (yellow-red card)	Sent off (straight red)	Booked	(yellow card) (yellow-red card)	Sent off (straight red)	Booked	(yellow card) (yellow-red card)	Sent off (straight red)
1	GK	(Spain) Kepa Arrizabalaga	0	0	0	0	0	0	0	0	0	1	0	0	0	0	0	1	0	0
2	DF	(Germany) Antonio Rüdiger	3	0	0	1	0	0	0	0	0	0	0	0	0	0	0	4	0	0
3	DF	(Spain) Marcos Alonso	4	0	0	0	0	0	0	0	0	0	0	1	0	0	0	4	0	1
4	DF	(Denmark) Andreas Christensen	5	0	0	0	0	0	0	0	0	0	0	0	0	0	0	5	0	0
5	MF	(Italy) Jorginho	10	0	0	0	0	0	0	0	0	3	0	0	0	0	0	13	0	0
7	MF	(France) N'Golo Kanté	4	0	0	0	0	0	0	0	0	1	0	0	0	0	0	5	0	0
8	MF	(England) Ross Barkley	0	0	0	1	0	0	0	0	0	0	0	0	0	0	0	1	0	0
9	FW	(England) Tammy Abraham	2	0	0	0	0	0	0	0	0	0	0	0	0	0	0	2	0	0
10	MF	(Brazil) Willian	4	0	0	0	0	0	0	0	0	0	0	0	0	0	0	4	0	0
11	MF	(Spain) Pedro	1	0	0	0	0	0	0	0	0	0	0	0	0	0	0	1	0	0
13	GK	(Argentina) Willy Caballero	0	0	0	0	0	0	0	0	0	1	0	0	0	0	0	1	0	0
15	DF	(France) Kurt Zouma	6	0	0	1	0	0	0	0	0	2	0	0	0	0	0	9	0	0
17	MF	(Croatia) Mateo Kovačić	8	0	0	1	1	0	1	0	0	0	0	0	0	0	0	10	1	0
18	FW	(France) Olivier Giroud	1	0	0	0	0	0	0	0	0	1	0	0	0	0	0	2	0	0
19	MF	(England) Mason Mount	3	0	0	1	0	0	0	0	0	0	0	0	0	0	0	4	0	0
20	MF	(England) Callum Hudson-Odoi	1	0	0	0	0	0	0	0	0	0	0	0	0	0	0	1	0	0
23	FW	(Belgium) Michy Batshuayi	0	0	0	0	0	0	1	0	0	0	0	0	0	0	0	1	0	0
24	DF	(England) Reece James	1	0	0	1	0	0	0	0	0	1	0	0	0	0	0	3	0	0
28	DF	(Spain) César Azpilicueta	1	0	0	1	0	0	0	0	0	2	0	0	1	0	0	5	0	0
29	DF	(England) Fikayo Tomori	3	0	0	0	0	0	0	0	0	1	0	0	0	0	0	4	0	0
33	DF	(Italy) Emerson	3	0	0	0	0	0	0	0	0	1	0	0	0	0	0	4	0	0
Total			60	0	0	7	1	0	2	0	0	14	0	1	1	0	0	84	1	1

Last updated: 8 August 2020.
Source: FBref.com

=== Summary ===
Competition	P	W	D	L	GF	GA	CS	Booked	(yellow card) (yellow-red card)	Sent off (straight red)
Premier League	38	20	6	12	69	54	9	60	0	0
FA Cup	6	5	0	1	11	4	3	7	1	0
EFL Cup	2	1	0	1	8	3	0	2	0	0
UEFA Champions League	8	3	2	3	12	16	1	14	0	1
UEFA Super Cup	1	0	1	0	2	2	0	1	0	0
Total	55	29	9	17	102	79	13	84	1	1

Last updated: 8 August 2020.
Source: FBref.com

== Awards ==
=== Players ===
No.	Pos.	Player	Award	Source
17	MF	(Croatia) Mateo Kovačić	Chelsea Player of the Year	
29	DF	(England) Fikayo Tomori	Chelsea Goal of the Season	
47	MF	(Scotland) Billy Gilmour	Chelsea Academy Player of the Year	

=== Manager ===
Manager	Award	Source
(England) Frank Lampard	Premier League Manager of the Month (October)	
