= Edward Gyamfi =

German footballer

Personal information
- Full name: Edward Marfo Gyamfi
- Date of birth: 11 April 2004 (age 22)
- Place of birth: Hamburg, Germany
- Position: Midfielder

Team information
- Current team: Bedford Town
- Number: 8

Youth career
- 2021–2022: Milton Keynes Dons

Senior career*
Years	Team	Apps	(Gls)
2022–2023	Milton Keynes Dons	1	(0)
2022–2023	→ Bedford Town (loan)	15	(3)
2023–	Watford	0	(0)
2024	→ Hemel Hempstead Town (loan)	2	(0)
2024–	Bedford Town	100	(6)
- * Club domestic league appearances and goals as of 00:00, 27 April 2026 (UTC)

Edward 'Junior' Marfo Gyamfi (born 11 April 2004) is a German professional footballer who plays as a midfielder for Bedford Town.

== Club career ==
=== Milton Keynes Dons ===
Gyamfi joined the academy of Milton Keynes Dons in 2021, and later signed professional terms in August 2022. He made his professional debut on 30 August 2022 in a 2–1 EFL Trophy group stage defeat at home to Cheltenham Town. In November 2022, Gyamfi joined Southern Premier Central club Bedford Town initially on a two-month loan, which was later extended to the remainder of the season after he scored 3 goals in 4 appearances.

At the conclusion of the 2022–23 season, Gyamfi was one of nine players released by Milton Keynes Dons following their relegation to League Two.

=== Watford ===
Following a four week trial, Gyamfi signed for Championship club Watford in September 2023 on a one-year deal with an option of a further year, initially linking up with the club's U21 side.

In March 2024, Gyamfi joined National League South club Hemel Hempstead Town on loan for the remainder of the season.

In June 2024, Gyamfi joined National League North club Bedford Town on a permanent contract.

== Career statistics ==
As of 18 April 2023

Appearances and goals by club, season and competition
Club	Season	League			FA Cup		EFL Cup		Other		Total	
Club	Season	Division	Apps	Goals	Apps	Goals	Apps	Goals	Apps	Goals	Apps	Goals
Milton Keynes Dons	2022–23	League One	0	0	0	0	0	0	1 (Note: Appearance(s) in EFL Trophy)	0	1	0
Bedford Town (loan)	2022–23	Southern Premier Central	15	3	—		—		—		15	3
Career total			15	3	0	0	0	0	1	0	16	3
