= Tennai Watson =

English footballer (born 1997)

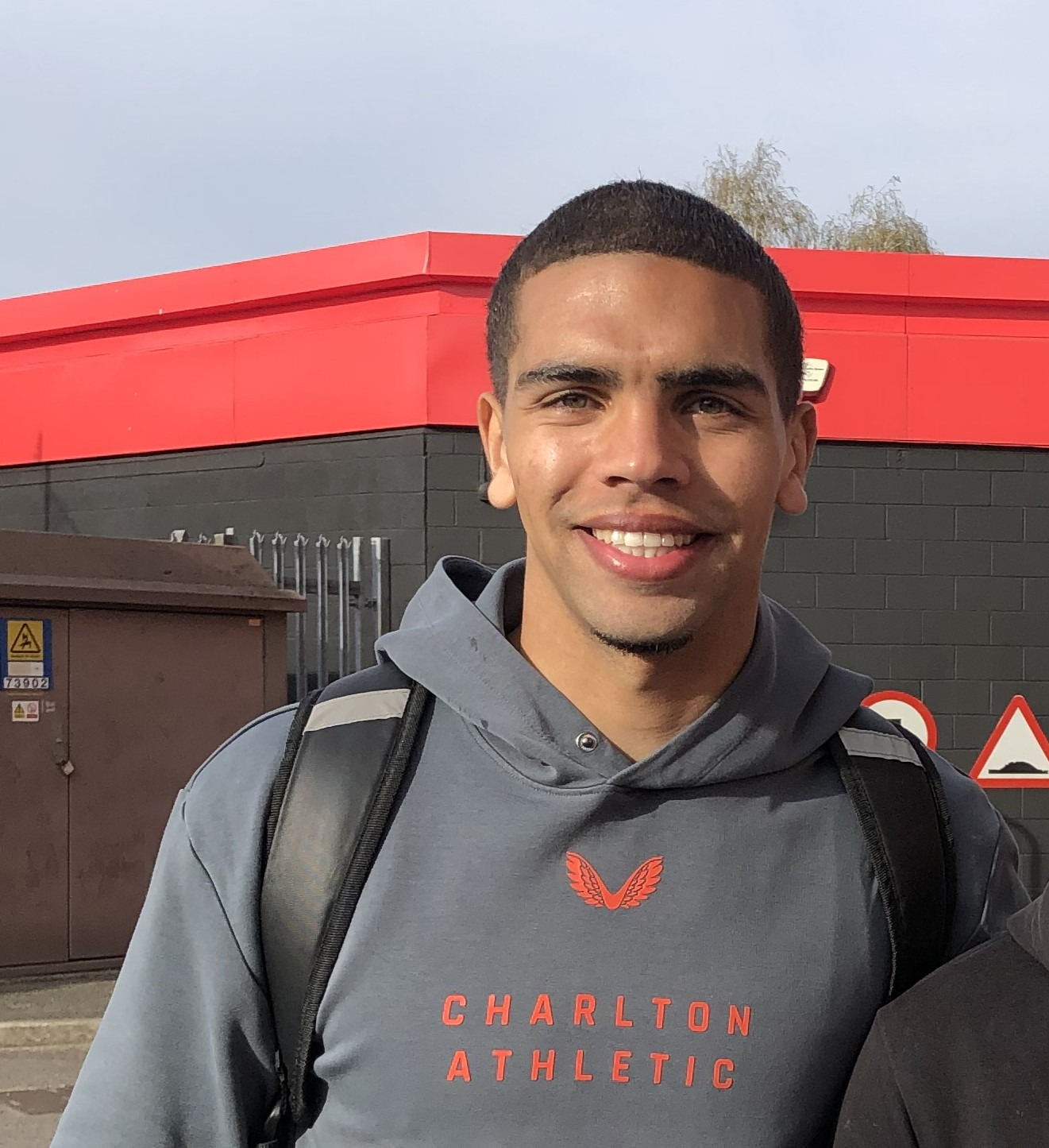
- Watson in 2025

Personal information
- Full name: Tennai Rosharne Watson
- Date of birth: 4 March 1997 (age 29)
- Place of birth: Hillingdon, England
- Height: 1.83 m (6 ft 0 in)
- Position: Wing-back

Youth career
- –2015: Reading

Senior career*
Years	Team	Apps	(Gls)
2015–2021	Reading	4	(0)
2018–2019	→ AFC Wimbledon (loan)	24	(0)
2019–2020	→ Coventry City (loan)	3	(0)
2021–2023	Milton Keynes Dons	58	(2)
2023–2025	Charlton Athletic	50	(1)
2025–2026	Barnsley	36	(1)
- * Club domestic league appearances and goals as of 17:10, 21 July 2026 (UTC)

Tennai Rosharne Watson (born 4 March 1997) is an English professional footballer who plays as a wing-back. He is currently a free agent.

== Career ==
=== Reading ===
Watson joined the academy of Reading at a young age, and progressed through the ranks to eventually sign professional terms with the club in May 2016. He made his first team debut on 6 August 2016, coming on as a 66th-minute substitute for the injured Jordan Obita.

On 1 February 2018, Watson signed a contract extension with Reading until the summer 2021, and was later sent out on loan for the 2018–19 and 2019–20 seasons to League One clubs AFC Wimbledon and Coventry City. However, at the end of the 2020–21 season, he was one of four Reading players released by the club.

=== Milton Keynes Dons ===
On 28 July 2021, Watson signed for the League One club Milton Keynes Dons after a successful trial period, having been recommended to the club by his former Reading teammate, Zak Jules. He made his league debut for the club on 7 August 2021, in a 3–3 draw away to Bolton Wanderers. On 8 December 2021, Watson scored his first career professional goal in a 1–1 draw at home to Plymouth Argyle. Despite the offer of a new contract, Watson was one of several players to part ways with the club following their relegation to EFL League Two at the conclusion of the 2022–23 season.

=== Charlton Athletic ===
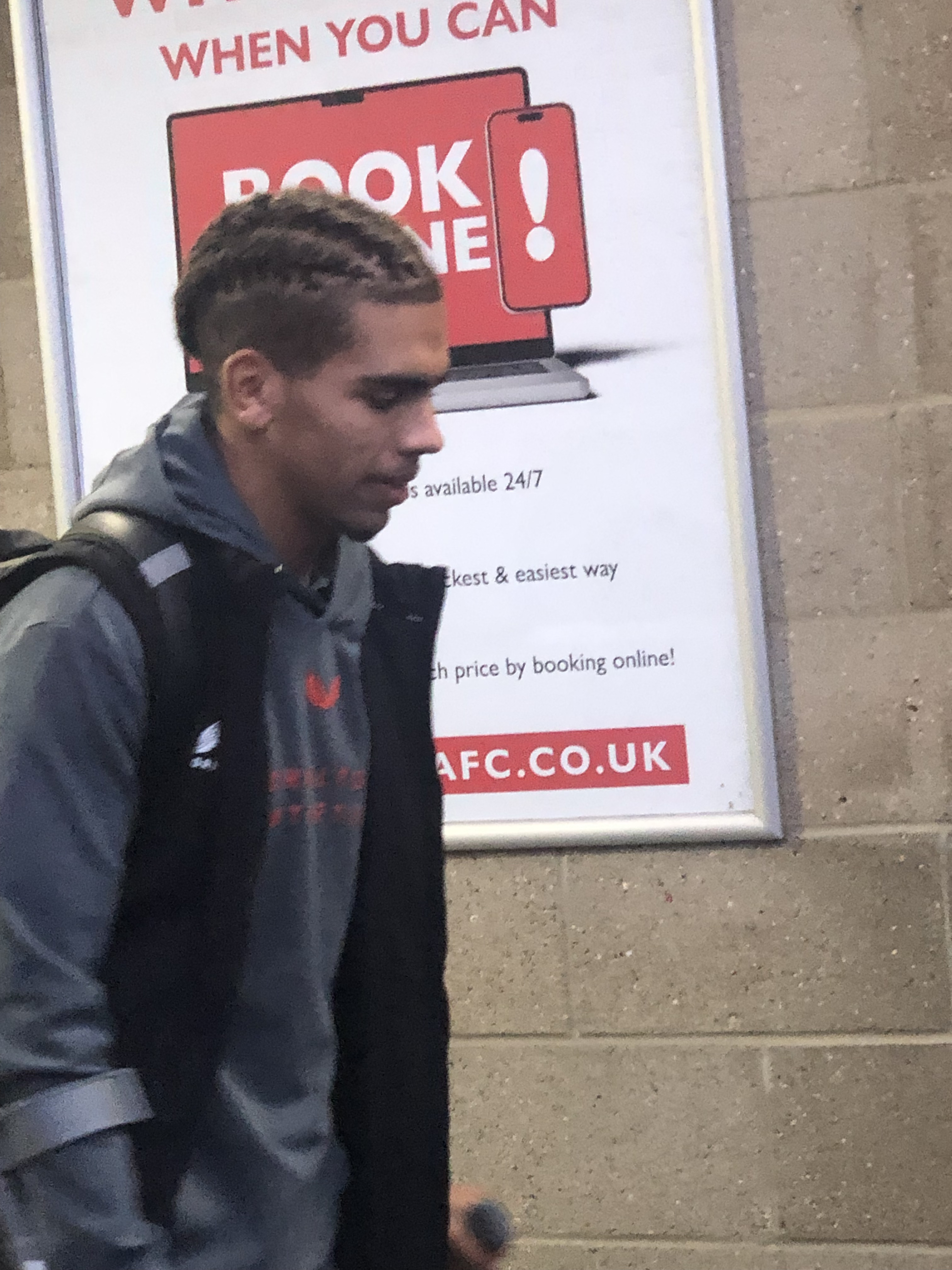
Watson on crutches after an injury against Wrexham in October 2024

On 1 September 2023, Watson signed for League One club Charlton Athletic on a two-year contract.

On 30 May 2025, it was confirmed Watson would leave the club following the conclusion of his contract.

=== Barnsley ===
On 8 August 2025, Watson signed a one-year deal at Barnsley.

On 17 May 2026, it was announced that Watson would leave the club following the conclusion of his contract.

== Career statistics ==
As of 18 April 2026

Club statistics
Club	Season	League			FA Cup		League Cup		Other		Total	
Club	Season	Division	Apps	Goals	Apps	Goals	Apps	Goals	Apps	Goals	Apps	Goals
Reading	2016–17	Championship	3	0	0	0	4	0	—		7	0
Reading	2017–18	Championship	0	0	0	0	0	0	—		0	0
Reading	2018–19	Championship	0	0	0	0	0	0	—		0	0
Reading	2019–20	Championship	0	0	0	0	0	0	—		0	0
Reading	2020–21	Championship	1	0	0	0	1	0	—		2	0
Reading	Total		4	0	0	0	5	0	0	0	9	0
AFC Wimbledon (loan)	2018–19	League One	24	0	2	0	1	0	1 (Note: Appearance(s) in EFL Trophy)	0	28	0
Coventry City (loan)	2019–20	League One	3	0	0	0	0	0	4	0	7	0
Milton Keynes Dons	2021–22	League One	28	2	1	0	1	0	6 (Note: Five appearances in EFL Trophy, one appearance in 2021–22 EFL League One play-offs)	0	36	2
Milton Keynes Dons	2022–23	League One	30	0	2	0	2	0	0	0	34	0
Milton Keynes Dons	Total		58	2	3	0	3	0	6	0	70	2
Charlton Athletic	2023–24	League One	34	1	3	0	0	0	3	0	40	1
Charlton Athletic	2024–25	League One	16	0	0	0	1	0	4 (Note: One appearance in the EFL Trophy and three appearances in the League One play-offs)	0	21	0
Charlton Athletic	Total		50	1	3	0	1	0	7	0	61	1
Barnsley	2025–26	League One	36	1	3	0	2	0	3	0	44	1
Career total			175	4	11	0	12	0	21	0	219	4

== Honours ==
Charlton Athletic

- EFL League One play-offs: 2025
