= Jamie Cumming =

English footballer (born 1999)

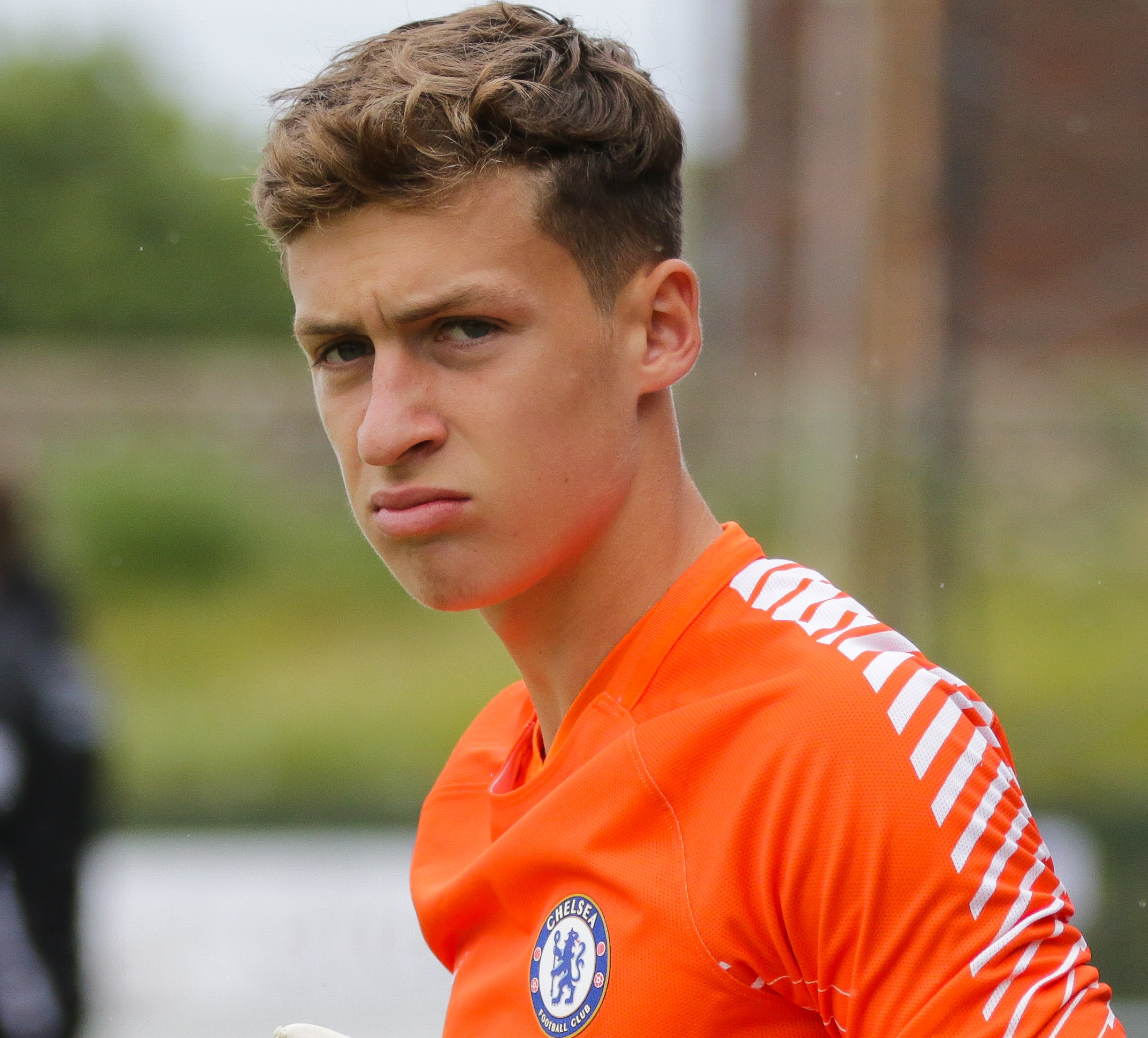
- Cumming with Chelsea U21 in 2017

Personal information
- Full name: James Andrew Cumming
- Date of birth: 4 September 1999 (age 27)
- Place of birth: Winchester, England
- Height: 1.89 m (6 ft 2 in)
- Position: Goalkeeper

Team information
- Current team: Oxford United
- Number: 1

Youth career
- 2008–2020: Chelsea

Senior career*
Years	Team	Apps	(Gls)
2020–2024	Chelsea	0	(0)
2020–2021	→ Stevenage (loan)	41	(0)
2021–2022	→ Gillingham (loan)	22	(0)
2022	→ Milton Keynes Dons (loan)	21	(0)
2022–2023	→ Milton Keynes Dons (loan)	46	(0)
2024	→ Oxford United (loan)	20	(0)
2024–	Oxford United	96	(0)

International career
2016	England U17	2	(0)
2018	England U19	1	(0)
- * Club domestic league appearances and goals as of 25 October 2026 (UTC)

James Andrew Cumming (born 4 September 1999) is an English professional footballer who plays as a goalkeeper for EFL League One club Oxford United.

A product of the Chelsea academy, Cumming signed his first professional contract with the club in 2018. He spent the 2020–21 season on loan at Stevenage, his first season of regular first-team football. After a loan spell at Gillingham during the first half of the 2021–22 season, he joined Milton Keynes Dons in January 2022, making 77 appearances across two loan spells. Cumming joined Oxford United on loan in January 2024, helping the club achieve promotion to the Championship via the play-offs before signing permanently in June 2024.

== Club career ==
=== Chelsea ===
Cumming joined Chelsea at the age of eight, progressing through the club's academy system to become first-choice goalkeeper for the under-17 team in 2017–18. That season, he made two EFL Trophy appearances for the under-21s and featured regularly in the UEFA Youth League, saving three penalties in a semi-final penalty shoot-out win against Porto. He signed his first professional contract with Chelsea in November 2018, keeping him contracted to the club until the end of the 2020–21 season. Cumming went on to make 11 EFL Trophy appearances over the following three seasons. He was named on the substitutes' bench in Chelsea's 4–1 UEFA Europa League Final victory over Arsenal in Baku on 29 May 2019.

==== Loan spells ====
Cumming joined League Two club Stevenage on a season-long loan on 17 August 2020, marking his first spell of senior football. He made his professional debut in a 3–3 EFL Cup draw with Portsmouth on 29 August 2020, which Stevenage lost 3–1 on penalties, and made his league debut in a 1–1 draw with Barrow on 12 September 2020. He went on to make 47 appearances in all competitions, registering 18 clean sheets as Stevenage finished the season with the third-best defensive record in League Two.

Ahead of the 2021–22 season, Cumming joined League One club Gillingham on a season-long loan on 26 July 2021. He debuted for Gillingham in a 1–1 home draw with Lincoln City on 7 August 2021, and made 22 appearances during the first half of the season before being recalled by Chelsea on 13 January 2022.

On the same day as his loan recall was officially announced, Cumming joined Milton Keynes Dons for the remainder of the 2021–22 season. He made his debut two days later in a 2–1 away victory against Portsmouth. Cumming made 23 appearances during the campaign, keeping 10 clean sheets as MK Dons finished third in League One. He returned to the club for a second loan spell on 9 July 2022, joining for the 2022–23 season. Cumming made 54 appearances during a season that ended in relegation to League Two, and was named both the club's Player of the Year and Players' Player of the Year at their end-of-season awards ceremony.

=== Oxford United ===
Having been included in Chelsea's pre-season tour of the United States ahead of the 2023–24 season, Cumming joined League One club Oxford United on a six-month loan on 11 January 2024. He became the club's first-choice goalkeeper during the second half of the season, making 23 appearances, including three in the 2024 League One play-offs, as Oxford secured promotion to the Championship with a 2–0 victory over Bolton Wanderers in the final at Wembley Stadium on 18 May 2024.

He signed for Oxford on a permanent basis on 27 June 2024, having impressed the management team during his loan spell with his development and composure in high-pressure situations. He made 45 appearances during the 2024–25 season, keeping 13 clean sheets, as Oxford finished 17th in the Championship. He signed a new long-term contract on 30 June 2025, stating the high standards within Oxford's goalkeeping department had continued to drive his improvement.

== International career ==
Cumming received his first international call-up in March 2016 for the England under-17 team during the UEFA European under-17 Championship elite qualifying round. He played in the final two group matches as England advanced to the tournament proper. He later represented the England under-19 team, earning one cap in a 2–0 defeat to Macedonia in a UEFA European under-19 Championship qualifying match on 27 March 2018.

== Career statistics ==
As of match played 4 October 2025

Appearances and goals by club, season and competition
Club	Season	League			FA Cup		EFL Cup		Other		Total	
Club	Season	Division	Apps	Goals	Apps	Goals	Apps	Goals	Apps	Goals	Apps	Goals
Chelsea U21s	2017–18	—							2 (Note: Appearance(s) in EFL Trophy)	0	2	0
Chelsea U21s	2018–19	—							5	0	5	0
Chelsea U21s	2019–20	—							4	0	4	0
Chelsea U21s	Total		0	0	0	0	0	0	11	0	11	0
Stevenage (loan)	2020–21	League Two	41	0	3	0	1	0	2	0	47	0
Gillingham (loan)	2021–22	League One	22	0	0	0	0	0	0	0	22	0
Milton Keynes Dons (loan)	2021–22	League One	21	0	—		—		2 (Note: Appearances in 2022 EFL League One play-offs)	0	23	0
Milton Keynes Dons (loan)	2022–23	League One	46	0	1	0	4	0	3	0	54	0
Milton Keynes Dons (loan)	Total		67	0	1	0	4	0	5	0	77	0
Oxford United (loan)	2023–24	League One	20	0	—		—		3 (Note: Appearances in 2024 EFL League One play-offs)	0	23	0
Oxford United	2024–25	Championship	45	0	0	0	0	0	0	0	45	0
Oxford United	2025–26	Championship	45	0	0	0	1	0	0	0	10	0
Oxford United	Total		74	0	0	0	1	0	3	0	78	0
Career total			204	0	4	0	6	0	21	0	235	0

== Honours ==
Chelsea

- UEFA Europa League: 2018–19

Oxford United

- EFL League One play-offs: 2024

Individual

- Milton Keynes Dons Player of the Year: 2022–23
- Milton Keynes Dons Players' Player of the Year: 2022–23
