= 2022–23 Milton Keynes Dons F.C. season =

Milton Keynes Dons
2022–23 season
- Chairman: Pete Winkelman
- Head Coach: Liam Manning (until 11 December); Dean Lewington (interim, from 11 Dec until 23 Dec); Mark Jackson (from 23 December until 9 May)
- Stadium: Stadium MK
- League One: 21st (relegated)
- FA Cup: Second round
- EFL Cup: Fourth round
- EFL Trophy: Round of 16
- Top goalscorer: League: Mohamed Eisa (11); All: Mohamed Eisa (14)
- Highest home attendance: League: 14,046 vs Ipswich Town (25 February 2023); All: 15,495 vs Leicester City (20 December 2022, EFL Cup R4)
- Lowest home attendance: League: 5,531 vs Shrewsbury Town (24 January 2023); All: 635 vs Newport County (22 November 2022, EFL Trophy Round of 32)
- Average home league attendance: 8,460
- Biggest win: 6–0 vs Taunton Town (H) (5 November 2022, FA Cup R1)
- Biggest defeat: 5–0 vs Bolton Wanderers (A) (14 February 2023, League One)
Home colours	Away colours	Third colours

The 2022–23 season was Milton Keynes Dons' 19th season in their existence, and the club's fourth consecutive season in League One. The club also competed in the FA Cup, EFL Cup and EFL Trophy.

The season covers the period from 1 July 2022 to 30 June 2023.

== Managerial changes ==
On 11 December 2022, head coach Liam Manning was sacked by the club, with club captain Dean Lewington taking over as interim manager whilst a permanent replacement was sought. Goalkeeper David Martin became acting assistant manager alongside, with Bradley Johnson also taking charge of the team for their EFL Cup fixture on 20 December while Lewington underwent hamstring surgery.

On 23 December 2022, it was announced that Mark Jackson had been appointed as the club's new head coach, however after five months in charge Jackson was sacked following the club's relegation to League Two having registered just six wins in 25 games.

== Pre-season friendlies ==
On 3 June, MK Dons announced their first two pre-season friendlies, against AFC Rushden & Diamonds and King's Lynn Town. A third, against Barnet was also confirmed.

All four of the club's pre-season friendlies took place away from Stadium MK due to the stadium being a host venue for UEFA Women's Euro 2022.

Win Draw Loss

5 July 2022 Friendly	AFC Rushden & Diamonds	0–4	Milton Keynes Dons	Rushden
19:30 BST		Report	McEachran 25' (pen.); Kemp 38'; Holland 65'; Robson 87'	Stadium: Hayden Road; Attendance: 862

15 July 2022 Friendly	Norwich City U23	0–6	Milton Keynes Dons	Norwich
14:00 BST		Report	Smith 13'; Burns 34', 51'; Grant 60'; Kemp 85'; Tripp 90'	Stadium: Lotus Training Centre; Attendance: 0 (behind closed doors)

16 July 2022 Friendly	King's Lynn Town	1–1	Milton Keynes Dons	King's Lynn
15:00 BST	Omotayo 36'	Report	Fleming 89' (o.g.)	Stadium: The Walks; Attendance: 371

23 July 2022 Friendly	Barnet	1–3	Milton Keynes Dons	Harrow
15:00 BST	De Havilland 77'	Report	Grigg 37'; B. Johnson 71'; Devoy 84'	Stadium: The Hive Stadium

== Competitions ==
=== Overall record ===
Competition	First match	Last match	Starting round	Final position	Record							
Competition	First match	Last match	Starting round	Final position	Pld	W	D	L	GF	GA	GD	Win %
League One	30 July 2022	7 May 2023	Matchday 1	21st	46	11	12	23	44	66	−22	23.91
FA Cup	5 November 2022	26 November 2022	First round	Second round	2	1	0	1	8	3	+5	50.00
EFL Cup	9 August 2022	20 December 2022	First round	Fourth round	4	3	0	1	5	3	+2	75.00
EFL Trophy	30 August 2022	13 December 2022	Group Stage	Round of 16	5	3	0	2	9	7	+2	60.00
Total					57	18	12	27	66	79	−13	31.58

Last updated: 7 May 2023
Source: [BBC Sport]

=== League One ===
==== League table ====
Pos	Team	Pld	W	D	L	GF	GA	GD	Pts	Promotion, qualification or relegation
18	Port Vale	46	13	10	23	48	71	−23	49	
19	Oxford United	46	11	14	21	49	56	−7	47	
20	Cambridge United	46	13	7	26	41	68	−27	46	
21	Milton Keynes Dons (R)	46	11	12	23	44	66	−22	45	Relegation to EFL League Two
22	Morecambe (R)	46	10	14	22	47	78	−31	44	Relegation to EFL League Two
23	Accrington Stanley (R)	46	11	11	24	40	77	−37	44	Relegation to EFL League Two
24	Forest Green Rovers (R)	46	6	9	31	31	89	−58	27	Relegation to EFL League Two

Source: EFL Official Website
Rules for classification: 1) Points; 2) Goal difference; 3) Number of goals scored; 4) Head-to-head results; 5) Wins; 6) Away goals; 7) Penalty points (sec 9.5); 8) 12-point sending off offences
(R) Relegated

==== Results summary ====
Overall								Home						Away					
Pld	W	D	L	GF	GA	GD	Pts	W	D	L	GF	GA	GD	W	D	L	GF	GA	GD
46	11	12	23	44	66	−22	45	4	7	12	20	33	−13	7	5	11	24	33	−9

Last updated: 7 May 2023.
Source: BBC

==== Results by matchday ====
Matchday	1	2	3	4	5	6	7	8	9	10	11	12	13	14	15	16	17	18	19	20	21	22	23	24	25	26	27	28	29	30	31	32	33	34	35	36	37	38	39	40	41	42	43	44	45	46
Ground	A	H	A	H	H	A	A	H	A	H	A	H	H	H	A	A	H	A	H	H	A	H	A	A	H	A	H	H	A	H	A	A	H	A	A	H	A	H	A	H	A	H	H	A	H	A
Result	L	L	L	W	D	W	L	L	W	L	L	L	L	L	W	D	L	L	D	L	W	W	L	L	D	W	L	L	W	D	L	L	L	D	L	W	W	W	D	D	D	D	L	L	D	D
Position	22	23	24	21	22	13	19	22	19	20	22	22	22	24	21	21	21	21	22	23	22	21	22	23	22	19	19	20	19	20	20	21	22	22	22	22	20	19	19	19	19	19	19	19	20	21

Updated to match(es) played on 7 May 2023. Source: 11v11 for league tables and fixtures
A = Away; H = Home; W = Win; D = Draw; L = Loss

==== Matches ====
The league fixtures for the 2022–23 season were announced on 23 June 2022. The club's opening game of the season was away to Cambridge United on 30 July 2022 with the final game of the season being away at Burton Albion on 7 May 2023.

Win Draw Loss Fixtures

30 July 2022 1	Cambridge United	1–0	Milton Keynes Dons	Cambridge
15:00 BST	Knibbs (yellow card) 9', (goal) 17'; Jones (yellow card) 59'	Report	Lawrence (yellow card) 41'; O'Hora (yellow card) 57'; Oyegoke (yellow card) 89'	Stadium: Abbey Stadium; Attendance: 6,588 (1,405 away); Referee: John Busby

6 August 2022 2	Milton Keynes Dons	0–1	Sheffield Wednesday	Milton Keynes
15:00 BST		Report	Windass 22' (pen.); Ihiekwe (yellow card) 45+2'; Bannan (yellow card) 67'; Paterson (yellow card) 76'; Dele-Bashiru (yellow card) 80'	Stadium: Stadium MK; Attendance: 13,241 (6,512 away); Referee: Anthony Backhouse

13 August 2022 3	Ipswich Town	3–0	Milton Keynes Dons	Ipswich
15:00 BST	Burns 5'; Harness 28'; Chaplin 60'	Report	Robson (yellow card) 59'	Stadium: Portman Road; Attendance: 23,045 (532 away); Referee: Carl Brook

16 August 2022 4	Milton Keynes Dons	2–1	Port Vale	Milton Keynes
19:45 BST	Johnson 34', 86'; Tucker (yellow card) 90+2'	Report	Harrison (yellow card) 53', (goal) 90+3'	Stadium: Stadium MK; Attendance: 7,011 (728 away); Referee: Tom Nield

20 August 2022 5	Milton Keynes Dons	1–1	Accrington Stanley	Milton Keynes
15:00 BST	Robson 30'; Johnson (yellow card) 61'; Lawrence (yellow card) 70'	Report	Astley (yellow card) 10'; Clark (yellow card) 43'; Hamilton (yellow card) 60'; McConville (yellow card) 68', (goal) 78' (pen.)	Stadium: Stadium MK; Attendance: 6,001 (142 away); Referee: Tom Reeves

27 August 2022 6	Morecambe	0–4	Milton Keynes Dons	Morecambe
15:00 BST		Report	Grigg 16', 36'; Grant 62'; Dennis 67'	Stadium: Mazuma Stadium; Attendance: 3,995 (279 away); Referee: Sam Barrott

3 September 2022 7	Exeter City	1–0	Milton Keynes Dons	Exeter
15:00 BST	Diabate 66'; Grounds (yellow card) 82'	Report	Harvie (yellow card) 69'	Stadium: St James Park; Attendance: 5,931 (286 away); Referee: Ben Toner

10 September 2022	Milton Keynes Dons	Postponed	Bristol Rovers	Milton Keynes
15:00 BST				Stadium: Stadium MK
Note: Fixture was postponed as a mark of respect following the passing of Queen Elizabeth II.

13 September 2022 8	Milton Keynes Dons	0–2	Bolton Wanderers	Milton Keynes
19:45 BST	Tucker (yellow card) 58'	Report	Charles 31' (pen.); Jones 60'; Morley (yellow card) 89'	Stadium: Stadium MK; Attendance: 6,339 (760 away); Referee: Chris Pollard

17 September 2022 9	Oxford United	1–2	Milton Keynes Dons	Oxford
15:00 BST	Mousinho 89'	Report	Smith 44'; McEachran (yellow card) 59'; Grigg 84' (pen.)	Stadium: Kassam Stadium; Attendance: 8,141 (715 away); Referee: Andrew Kitchen

24 September 2022	Lincoln City	Postponed	Milton Keynes Dons	Lincoln
15:00 BST				Stadium: LNER Stadium
Note: Fixture was postponed due to international call-ups.

1 October 2022 10	Milton Keynes Dons	2–3	Peterborough United	Milton Keynes
15:00 BST	Robson (yellow card) 45'; Devoy (yellow card) 68'; Johnson (yellow card) 82'; Harvie 90'; Smith 90+1'	Report	Clarke-Harris 3'; Fuchs (yellow card) 32'; Poku 36'; Jones 54'	Stadium: Stadium MK; Attendance: 8,963 (2,631 away); Referee: Oliver Yates

8 October 2022 11	Shrewsbury Town	2–1	Milton Keynes Dons	Shrewsbury
15:00 BST	Bayliss 24'; Shipley 45+2'; Street (yellow card) 90+6'	Report	Jules 54'; Devoy (red card) 59'; Dennis (yellow card) 64'; McEachran (yellow card) 70'	Stadium: Montgomery Waters Meadow; Attendance: 5,875 (290 away); Referee: Andy Woolmer

11 October 2022 12	Milton Keynes Dons	0–1	Bristol Rovers	Milton Keynes
19:45 BST	Harvie (yellow card) 16'; Jules (yellow card) 63'; Robson (yellow card) 87'	Report	Collins (yellow card) 15'; Thomas (yellow card) 33'; Evans 76' (pen.)	Stadium: Stadium MK; Attendance: 6,466 (772 away); Referee: Scott Oldham

15 October 2022 13	Milton Keynes Dons	1–4	Plymouth Argyle	Milton Keynes
15:00 BST	Grigg 49'; Robson (yellow card) 70'; Cumming (yellow card) 85'	Report	Whittaker 9'; Ennis 25'; Azaz 37', 59'	Stadium: Stadium MK; Attendance: 10,656 (2,603 away); Referee: Sam Allison

22 October 2022 14	Milton Keynes Dons	0–1	Wycombe Wanderers	Milton Keynes
15:00 BST	Harvie (yellow card) 18'	Report	Freeman 40'; Jacobson (yellow card) 61'	Stadium: Stadium MK; Attendance: 7,377 (1,241 away); Referee: Oliver Langford

25 October 2022 15	Charlton Athletic	0–2	Milton Keynes Dons	London (Charlton)
19:45 BST	Inniss (yellow card) 54' (yellow-red card) 65'	Report	Grigg 66' (pen.); Johnson 78'	Stadium: The Valley; Attendance: 12,328 (400 away); Referee: Neil Hair

29 October 2022 16	Cheltenham Town	0–0	Milton Keynes Dons	Cheltenham
15:00 BST	Sercombe (yellow card) 70'		Johnson (yellow card) 52'; Harvie (yellow card) 55'; Jules (yellow card) 73'	Stadium: Completely-Suzuki Stadium; Attendance: 3,655 (425 away); Referee: Darren Drysdale

12 November 2022 17	Milton Keynes Dons	1–3	Derby County	Milton Keynes
15:00 GMT	Barry 41'; Harvie (yellow card) 45+1'; Lewington (yellow card) 46'; Dennis (yellow card) 90+2'	Report	Mendez-Laing (yellow card) 39', (goal) 79'; Roberts 43'; Collins 53'; Rooney (yellow card) 67'; Wildsmith (yellow card) 77'	Stadium: Stadium MK; Attendance: 13,950 (6,542 away); Referee: James Linington

19 November 2022 18	Barnsley	3–1	Milton Keynes Dons	Barnsley
15:00 GMT	Williams 18'; Connell (yellow card) 26'; Andersen (yellow card) 45+2'; Phillips 50'; Kitching (yellow card) 52'; Kane 68'	Report	McEachran (yellow card) 23'; Eisa 40', (yellow card) 45+3'; Lawrence (yellow card) 84'; Jules (yellow card) 90+2'	Stadium: Oakwell Stadium; Attendance: 9,994 (391 away); Referee: Andy Haines

3 December 2022 19	Milton Keynes Dons	1–1	Burton Albion	Milton Keynes
12:30 GMT	Harvie (yellow card) 45+5'; Johnson 84'	Report	Adeboyejo 29' (pen.); Onyango (yellow card) 64'; Garratt (yellow card) 90+1'	Stadium: Stadium MK; Attendance: 6,073 (250 away); Referee: Lee Swabey

10 December 2022 20	Milton Keynes Dons	1–2	Fleetwood Town	Milton Keynes
15:00 GMT	O'Hora 52'; Watson (yellow card) 69'	Report	Lynch (yellow card) 70'; Johnston 72'; Batty 90'	Stadium: Stadium MK; Attendance: 5,672 (126 away); Referee: Martin Coy

17 December 2022 21	Portsmouth	0–2	Milton Keynes Dons	Milton
15:00 GMT	Hackett-Fairchild (yellow card) 56'; Dale (yellow card) 58'; Ogilvie (yellow card) 70'	Report	Jules (yellow card) 28'; Johnson 34'; Tucker 64'	Stadium: Fratton Park; Attendance: 17,426 (236 away); Referee: Sam Barrott

26 December 2022 22	Milton Keynes Dons	1–0	Forest Green Rovers	Milton Keynes
15:00 GMT	O'Hora (yellow card) 19'; Harvie 58'; McEachran (yellow card) 63'; Tucker (yellow card) 77'; Johnson (yellow card) 84'	Report	Little (yellow card) 76'; Casey (yellow card) 90+2'	Stadium: Stadium MK; Attendance: 6,516 (269 away); Referee: Lewis Smith

29 December 2022 23	Peterborough United	2–0	Milton Keynes Dons	Peterborough
19:45 GMT	Burrows (yellow card) 27'; Ward 38'; Jones 48', (yellow card) 85'; Poku (yellow card) 73'	Report	Grigg (yellow card) 30'; Jules (yellow card) 61'	Stadium: Weston Homes Stadium; Attendance: 8,391 (699 away); Referee: David Rock

1 January 2023 24	Plymouth Argyle	3–1	Milton Keynes Dons	Plymouth
15:00 GMT	Wilson 4'; Ennis 37'; Whittaker 53'	Report	Holland 19'; Tucker (yellow card) 49'	Stadium: Home Park; Attendance: 15,421 (198 away); Referee: Paul Howard

14 January 2023 25	Milton Keynes Dons	0–0	Lincoln City	Milton Keynes
15:00 GMT	McEachran (yellow card) 75'	Report	O'Connor (yellow card) 90+4'	Stadium: Stadium MK; Attendance: 8,317 (885 away); Referee: Ben Speedie

21 January 2023 26	Forest Green Rovers	1–2	Milton Keynes Dons	Nailsworth
15:00 GMT	Bakayoko (yellow card) 14'; Peart-Harris 29', (yellow card) 56'	Report	Eisa 43', 51'; Johnson (yellow card) 48'; McEachran (yellow card) 55'; Cumming (yellow card) 86'; Grant (yellow card) 90+9'	Stadium: The Bolt New Lawn; Attendance: 2,919 (527 away); Referee: Anthony Backhouse

24 January 2023 27	Milton Keynes Dons	0–1	Shrewsbury Town	Milton Keynes
19:45 GMT	Devoy (yellow card) 45+3'	Report	Moore (yellow card) 9'; Winchester (yellow card) 71'; Leahy (yellow card) 88'; Bayliss 89'	Stadium: Stadium MK; Attendance: 5,531 (267 away); Referee: Alan Young

28 January 2023 28	Milton Keynes Dons	0–2	Exeter City	Milton Keynes
15:00 GMT	Devoy (yellow card) 36'; Harvie (yellow card) 63'; Kaikai (yellow card) 78'; Watson (yellow card) 81'	Report	Brown (yellow card) 22', (goal) 37' (pen.), 67'	Stadium: Stadium MK; Attendance: 6,719 (614 away); Referee: Andy Haines

4 February 2023 29	Bristol Rovers	0–2	Milton Keynes Dons	Bristol
15:00 GMT	Coutts (yellow card) 18'; Finley (yellow card) 59'	Report	Eisa 3' (pen.); Devoy (yellow card) 45+2'; Maghoma (yellow card) 68'; Leko (yellow card) 76'; Johnson (yellow card) 76'; Dean 90+1', (yellow card) 90+4'	Stadium: Memorial Stadium; Attendance: 8,429 (300 away); Referee: Carl Boyeson

11 February 2023 30	Milton Keynes Dons	1–1	Oxford United	Milton Keynes
15:00 GMT	Kaikai 25'; Maghoma (yellow card) 53'	Report	Fleming (yellow card) 13'; Brannagan (yellow card) 59'; Bate 71'	Stadium: Stadium MK; Attendance: 9,116 (2,112 away); Referee: Andrew Kitchen

14 February 2023 31	Bolton Wanderers	5–0	Milton Keynes Dons	Horwich
19:45 GMT	Santos 7'; Mbete 21'; Jones 28'; Toal 62'; Williams 90+2'	Report		Stadium: University of Bolton Stadium; Attendance: 16,634 (177 away); Referee: Marc Edwards

18 February 2023 32	Sheffield Wednesday	5–2	Milton Keynes Dons	Owlerton
15:00 GMT	Windass 9'; Smith 54' (pen.), 74'; Gregory 64'; Byers 89'	Report	Leko 2'; McEachran (yellow card) 18'; Eisa 24'	Stadium: Hillsborough; Attendance: 24,318; Referee: Scott Oldham

25 February 2023 33	Milton Keynes Dons	0–1	Ipswich Town	Milton Keynes
15:00 GMT	McEachran (yellow card) 41'; Burns (yellow card) 86'	Report	Morsy 26'; Humphreys (yellow card) 45+1'; Chaplin (yellow card) 88'	Stadium: Stadium MK; Attendance: 14,046 (6,740 away); Referee: Rebecca Welch

28 February 2023 34	Lincoln City	1–1	Milton Keynes Dons	Lincoln
19:45 GMT	Mandroiu 5'; House (yellow card) 90+3'	Report	Jules (yellow card) 39'; Maghoma 89'; Leko (yellow card) 90+3'	Stadium: LNER Stadium; Attendance: 7,056 (186 away); Referee: Seb Stockbridge

4 March 2023 35	Port Vale	1–0	Milton Keynes Dons	Burslem
15:00 GMT	Harrison (yellow card) 19'; Donnelly 22'; Ojo (yellow card) 43'; Wilson (yellow card) 90+6'	Report	Jules (yellow card) 20'; Tucker (yellow card) 35'; Harvie (yellow card) 50'	Stadium: Vale Park; Attendance: 6,696 (314 away); Referee: Darren Handley

11 March 2023 36	Milton Keynes Dons	1–0	Cambridge United	Milton Keynes
15:00 GMT	Eisa 35'	Report	Jones (yellow card) 36'; Smith (yellow card) 37'; Seddon (yellow card) 81'; Brophy (yellow card) 90+4'	Stadium: Stadium MK; Attendance: 11,291 (2,186 away); Referee: Keith Stroud

18 March 2023 37	Accrington Stanley	0–1	Milton Keynes Dons	Accrington
15:00 GMT	Nottingham (yellow card) 39'; Tharme (yellow card) 45+1'; Leigh (yellow card) 80'	Report	Kaikai 8'; Lewington (yellow card) 47'; Watson (yellow card) 64'	Stadium: Wham Stadium; Attendance: 2,465 (290 away); Referee: Craig Hicks

25 March 2023 38	Milton Keynes Dons	1–0	Morecambe	Milton Keynes
15:00 GMT	Leko 57'; Maghoma (yellow card) 74'	Report	Simeu (yellow card) 40'; Bedeau (yellow card) 79'; Watts (yellow card) 90'	Stadium: Stadium MK; Attendance: 6,758 (206 away); Referee: Thomas Parsons

1 April 2023 39	Wycombe Wanderers	2–2	Milton Keynes Dons	High Wycombe
15:00 BST	Wheeler 22', 55'	Report	Harvie 9'; Eisa (yellow card) 29'; Watson (yellow card) 62'; Leko 71', (yellow card) 74'	Stadium: Adams Park; Attendance: 6,149 (893 away); Referee: Sam Purkiss

7 April 2023 40	Milton Keynes Dons	1–1	Portsmouth	Milton Keynes
15:00 BST	Eisa 65'	Report	Ogilvie 14', (yellow card) 24'; Pack (yellow card) 26'; Morrell (red card) 39'; Raggett (yellow card) 54'; Bishop (yellow card) 73'	Stadium: Stadium MK; Attendance: 11,395 (4,171 away); Referee: Carl Brook

10 April 2023 41	Derby County	1–1	Milton Keynes Dons	Derby
15:00 BST	McGoldrick 17'; Rooney (yellow card) 70'; Roberts (yellow card) 84'	Report	Maghoma (yellow card) 24'; Lawrence 68'; Watson (yellow card) 74'	Stadium: Pride Park Stadium; Attendance: 26,793 (962 away); Referee: Ben Speedie

15 April 2023 42	Milton Keynes Dons	2–2	Cheltenham Town	Milton Keynes
15:00 BST	Eisa 45+2', 59' (pen.); Lewington (yellow card) 90+2'	Report	Bonds 12'; Long (yellow card) 32'; May (penalty missed) 70', 90+7', (yellow card) 90+8'	Stadium: Stadium MK; Attendance: 6,974 (409 away); Referee: Ben Toner

18 April 2023 43	Milton Keynes Dons	0–1	Charlton Athletic	Milton Keynes
19:45 BST		Report	Leaburn (yellow card) 33'; Payne 61'; Dobson (yellow card) 63'; Kane (yellow card) 90+8'	Stadium: Stadium MK; Attendance: 6,600 (755 away); Referee: Sam Allison

22 April 2023 44	Fleetwood Town	1–0	Milton Keynes Dons	Fleetwood
15:00 BST	Rooney (yellow card) 43'; Omochere 44'; Nsiala (yellow card) 86'	Report	Watson (yellow card) 75'; Grigg (yellow card) 86'; Kaikai (yellow card) 90+6'; Maghoma (yellow card) 90+8'	Stadium: Highbury Stadium; Attendance: 3,258; Referee: Rebecca Welch

29 April 2023 45	Milton Keynes Dons	4–4	Barnsley	Milton Keynes
15:00 BST	McEachran (yellow card) 19'; Eisa 48' (pen.), 61'; Leko 52'; O'Hora 69'; Johnson (yellow card) 90+2'	Report	Kitching (yellow card) 23'; Kane 30'; Benson (yellow card) 50'; Norwood 73'; Watters 75', 86'	Stadium: Stadium MK; Attendance: 9,579 (2,139 away); Referee: Anthony Backhouse

7 May 2023 46	Burton Albion	0–0	Milton Keynes Dons	Burton upon Trent
12:00 BST	Oshilaja (yellow card) 53'	Report	McEachran (yellow card) 32'	Stadium: Pirelli Stadium; Attendance: 5,021 (1,698 away); Referee: Seb Stockbridge

=== FA Cup ===
Matches

In the first round, MK Dons were drawn at home to either Yeovil Town or Taunton Town. A day later, Taunton Town beat Yeovil Town in a Fourth qualifying round replay. In the second round, the club were drawn away to fellow League One side Portsmouth.

Win Draw Loss Fixtures

5 November 2022 First round	Milton Keynes Dons	6–0	Taunton Town	Milton Keynes
15:00 GMT	Devoy 6'; Grigg 13'; Burns 48'; Eisa 74'; Grant 82', 84'	Report	Grimes (yellow card) 67'	Stadium: Stadium MK; Attendance: 2,739 (908 away); Referee: Thomas Kirk

26 November 2022 Second round	Portsmouth	3–2	Milton Keynes Dons	Milton
15:00 GMT	Hackett-Fairchild 22'; Bishop 35' (pen.), 48' (pen.)	Report	Burns 19'; McEachran (yellow card) 38'; Eisa 61'; Lawrence (yellow card) 89'	Stadium: Fratton Park; Attendance: 8,056 (203 away); Referee: Sunny Gill

=== EFL Cup ===
Matches

The club were drawn at home to Sutton United in the first round. In the second round, the club were drawn away to EFL Championship club Watford. In round three, the club were drawn at home to fellow League One side Morecambe. In the fourth round, the club were drawn at home to Premier League side Leicester City.

Win Draw Loss Fixtures

9 August 2022 First round	Milton Keynes Dons	1–0	Sutton United	Milton Keynes
19:45 BST	Grant 41'	Report		Stadium: Stadium MK; Attendance: 2,263; Referee: Charles Breakspear

23 August 2022 Second round	Watford	0–2	Milton Keynes Dons	Watford
19:45 BST		Report	Dennis 45'; Burns 53'; Devoy (yellow card) 76'; Oyegoke (yellow card) 79'	Stadium: Vicarage Road; Attendance: 8,891 (1,759 away); Referee: Andy Woolmer

8 November 2022 Third round	Milton Keynes Dons	2–0	Morecambe	Milton Keynes
19:45 GMT	O'Hora 18'; Eisa (yellow card) 22'; Dennis 51'	Report	Watts (yellow card) 35'; Gibson (yellow card) 83'	Stadium: Stadium MK; Attendance: 1,674 (108 away); Referee: Ben Toner

20 December 2022 Fourth round	Milton Keynes Dons	0–3	Leicester City	Milton Keynes
19:45 GMT		Report	Tielemans 18'; Pérez 29'; Vardy 50'	Stadium: Stadium MK; Attendance: 15,495 (6,594 away); Referee: Andre Marriner

=== EFL Trophy ===
On 20 June, the initial Group stage draw was made, grouping MK Dons with Cheltenham Town and Walsall. Three days later, West Ham United U21s joined Southern Group C. MK Dons were then drawn at home to Newport County in the Round of 32, and away to Bristol Rovers in the Round of 16.

Pos	Div	Team	Pld	W	PW	PL	L	GF	GA	GD	Pts	Qualification
1	L1	Milton Keynes Dons	3	2	0	0	1	5	2	+3	6	Advance to Round 2
2	L1	Cheltenham Town	3	2	0	0	1	5	4	+1	6	Advance to Round 2
3	ACA	West Ham United U21	3	2	0	0	1	3	3	0	6	
4	L2	Walsall	3	0	0	0	3	1	5	−4	0	

Source: EFL.com

Matches

Win Draw Loss Fixtures

30 August 2022 Group stage	Milton Keynes Dons	1–2	Cheltenham Town	Milton Keynes
19:00 BST	Oyegoke (yellow card) 7'; Gyamfi (yellow card) 17'; Jules 43'	Report	May 8' (pen.); Raglan (yellow card) 12'; Horton (yellow card) 33'; Barkers (yellow card) 42'; Brown 54'	Stadium: Stadium MK; Attendance: 1,626; Referee: Lee Swabey

4 October 2022 Group stage	Milton Keynes Dons	2–0	West Ham United U21	Milton Keynes
19:00 BST	O'Hora (yellow card) 28'; Dennis 63', 74' (pen.); Lawrence (yellow card) 85'	Report		Stadium: Stadium MK; Attendance: 854; Referee: Craig Hicks

18 October 2022 Group stage	Walsall	0–2	Milton Keynes Dons	Walsall
19:00 BST	Maddox (yellow card) 66'; Comley (yellow card) 84'; Bennett (yellow card) 85'; Allen (yellow card) 90+2'	Report	Lawrence 62'; Holland 90+3'	Stadium: Bescot Stadium; Attendance: 1,070; Referee: Scott Tallis

22 November 2022 Round of 32	Milton Keynes Dons	3–1	Newport County	Milton Keynes
19:00 GMT	Burns 27'; Dennis 59'; Grigg 77'	Report	Demetriou (yellow card) 34'; Tucker 85' (o.g.)	Stadium: Stadium MK; Attendance: 635 (72 Away); Referee: Carl Brook

13 December 2022 Round of 16	Bristol Rovers	4–1	Milton Keynes Dons	Horfield
19:30 GMT	Hoole 33'; Marquis 54', 66'; Saunders 71'; Kilgour (red card) 77'; McCormick (yellow card) 82'	Report	Johnson (yellow card) 45+4'; Eisa 79' (pen.)	Stadium: Memorial Stadium; Attendance: 864; Referee: Declan Bourne

== Player details ==
Note: Players' ages as of the opening day of the 2022–23 season.

#	Name	Nationality	Position	Date of birth (age)	Signed from	Signed in	Transfer fee
Goalkeepers
1	Jamie Cumming	(England)	GK	4 September 1999 (aged 22)	(England) Chelsea	2022	Loan
18	David Martin	(England)	GK	22 January 1986 (aged 36)	Free agent	2022	Free
23	Franco Ravizzoli	(Argentina)	GK	9 July 1997 (aged 25)	(England) Eastbourne Borough	2021	Free
Defenders
2	Tennai Watson	(England)	RWB	4 March 1997 (aged 25)	Free agent	2021	Free
3	Dean Lewington (captain)	(England)	CB	18 May 1984 (aged 38)	(England) Wimbledon	2004	Free
4	Jack Tucker	(England)	CB	13 November 1999 (aged 22)	(England) Gillingham	2022	Compensation
5	Warren O'Hora	(Republic of Ireland)	CB	2 July 1997 (aged 25)	(England) Brighton & Hove Albion	2021	Undisclosed
19	Anthony Stewart	(England)	CB	18 September 1992 (aged 29)	(Scotland) Aberdeen	2023	Loan
21	Daniel Harvie	(Scotland)	LWB	14 July 1998 (aged 24)	(Scotland) Ayr United	2020	Undisclosed
22	Henry Lawrence	(England)	RB	21 September 2001 (aged 20)	(England) Chelsea	2022	Loan
33	Zak Jules	(Scotland)	CB	2 July 1997 (aged 25)	(England) Walsall	2021	Undisclosed
Midfielders
6	Josh McEachran	(England)	CM	1 March 1993 (aged 29)	Free agent	2021	Free
7	Matt Smith	(Wales)	CM	22 November 1999 (aged 22)	(England) Manchester City	2022	Undisclosed
8	Ethan Robson	(England)	CM	25 October 1996 (aged 25)	(England) Blackpool	2022	Free
11	Nathan Holland	(England)	LM	19 June 1998 (aged 24)	(England) West Ham United	2022	Free
14	Bradley Johnson	(England)	CM	28 April 1987 (aged 35)	Free agent	2022	Free
16	Conor Grant	(Republic of Ireland)	AM	20 November 2001 (aged 20)	(England) Rochdale	2022	Undisclosed
20	Darragh Burns	(Republic of Ireland)	RM	6 August 2002 (aged 19)	(Republic of Ireland) St Patrick's Athletic	2022	£150,000
28	Dawson Devoy	(Republic of Ireland)	AM	23 July 2001 (aged 21)	(Republic of Ireland) Bohemians	2022	Undisclosed
42	Paris Maghoma	(England)	CM	8 May 2001 (aged 21)	(England) Brentford	2023	Loan
Forwards
9	Will Grigg	(Northern Ireland)	CF	3 July 1991 (aged 31)	Free agent	2022	Free
10	Mohamed Eisa	(Sudan)	CF	12 July 1994 (aged 28)	(England) Peterborough United	2021	Undisclosed
12	Jonathan Leko	(Democratic Republic of the Congo)	RW	24 April 1999 (aged 23)	(England) Birmingham City	2023	Undisclosed
15	Joshua Kayode	(Republic of Ireland)	CF	4 May 2000 (aged 22)	(England) Rotherham United	2022	Loan
24	Sullay Kaikai	(Sierra Leone)	LW	26 August 1995 (aged 26)	(England) Wycombe Wanderers	2023	Free
29	Max Dean	(England)	CF	21 February 2004 (aged 18)	(England) Leeds United	2023	Undisclosed
Out on loan
17	Dan Kemp	(England)	AM	11 January 1999 (aged 23)	(England) Leyton Orient	2022	Undisclosed
25	Brooklyn Ilunga	(England)	LWB	21 November 2003 (aged 18)	Academy	2022	Trainee
26	Jack Davies	(England)	CB	3 December 2002 (aged 19)	Academy	2020	Trainee
27	Lewis Johnson	(England)	LW	9 January 2004 (aged 18)	Academy	2020	Trainee
30	Matthew Dennis	(England)	CF	15 April 2002 (aged 20)	(England) Norwich City	2022	Undisclosed
31	Ronnie Sandford	(England)	GK	24 February 2005 (aged 17)	Academy	2021	Trainee
32	Edward Gyamfi	(Germany)	CM	1 July 2004 (aged 18)	Academy	2022	Trainee
Left club during season
12	Daniel Oyegoke	(England)	RB	3 January 2003 (aged 19)	(England) Brentford	2022	Loan
19	Louie Barry	(England)	LW	21 June 2003 (aged 19)	(England) Aston Villa	2022	Loan

== Transfers ==
=== Transfers in ===
Date	Position	Nationality	Name	From	Fee	Ref.
Summer
24 June 2022	AM	(Republic of Ireland)	Conor Grant	(England) Rochdale	Undisclosed	
1 July 2022	CF	(England)	Matthew Dennis	(England) Norwich City	Undisclosed	
1 July 2022	LW	(England)	Nathan Holland	(England) West Ham United	Free Transfer	
1 July 2022	CM	(England)	Ethan Robson	(England) Blackpool	Free	
1 July 2022	CB	(England)	Jack Tucker	(England) Gillingham	Compensation	
4 July 2022	RW	(Republic of Ireland)	Darragh Burns	(Republic of Ireland) St Patrick's Athletic	£150,000	
13 July 2022	AM	(Republic of Ireland)	Dawson Devoy	(Republic of Ireland) Bohemians	Undisclosed	
14 July 2022	CF	(Northern Ireland)	Will Grigg	Free agent	Free	
15 July 2022	CM	(England)	Bradley Johnson	Free agent	Free	
23 September 2022	GK	(England)	David Martin	Free agent	Free	
Winter
13 January 2023	RW	(Democratic Republic of the Congo)	Jonathan Leko	(England) Birmingham City	Undisclosed	
19 January 2023	CF	(England)	Max Dean	(England) Leeds United	Undisclosed	
26 January 2023	LW	(Sierra Leone)	Sullay Kaikai	(England) Wycombe Wanderers	Free	

=== Transfers out ===
Date	Position	Nationality	Name	To	Fee	Ref.
18 June 2022	CB	(England)	Harry Darling	(Wales) Swansea City	£1,400,000	
26 June 2022	AM	(England)	Scott Twine	(England) Burnley	£4,000,000	
1 July 2022	CB	(England)	Aden Baldwin	(England) Notts County	Released	
1 July 2022	CF	(England)	Jay Bird	(England) Dagenham & Redbridge	Released	
1 July 2022	CM	(England)	Hiram Boateng	(England) Mansfield Town	Released	
1 July 2022	CM	(England)	John Freeman	(England) Cambridge City	Released	
1 July 2022	CM	(Nigeria)	David Kasumu	(England) Huddersfield Town (Note: Contract expired 30 June 2022. Declined new deal and signed for Huddersfield Town on 6 July 2022. Compensation paid due to player's age.)	Compensation	
1 July 2022	LWB	(England)	Brandon Mason	(England) Crawley Town	Released	
1 July 2022	CF	(England)	Connor Wickham	(England) Forest Green Rovers	Released	

=== Loans in ===
Date from	Position	Nationality	Name	From	Date until	Ref.
Summer
9 July 2022	GK	(England)	Jamie Cumming	(England) Chelsea	End of season	
12 July 2022	LW	(England)	Louie Barry	(England) Aston Villa	30 January 2023 (Note: On 30 January, Barry returned to Aston Villa after his loan was cut short, with the player joining Salford City on loan)	
22 July 2022	RB	(England)	Henry Lawrence	(England) Chelsea	End of season	
27 July 2022	RB	(England)	Daniel Oyegoke	(England) Brentford	2 January 2023 (Note: On 2 January, Oyegoke returned to Brentford after his loan was cut short)	
29 August 2022	CF	(Republic of Ireland)	Joshua Kayode	(England) Rotherham United	End of season	
Winter
23 January 2023	CM	(England)	Paris Maghoma	(England) Brentford	End of season	
31 January 2023	CB	(England)	Anthony Stewart	(Scotland) Aberdeen	End of season	

=== Loans out ===
Date from	Position	Nationality	Name	To	Date until	Ref.
Summer
29 July 2022	GK	(England)	Ronnie Sandford	(England) Hertford Town	End of season	
7 August 2022	CB	(England)	Jack Davies	(England) Concord Rangers	TBC	
7 August 2022	LW	(England)	Lewis Johnson	(England) Concord Rangers	TBC	
1 September 2022	LWB	(England)	Brooklyn Ilunga	(England) Hemel Hempstead Town	January 2023	
22 November 2022	MF	(England)	Joel Anker	(England) Tring Athletic	Work Experience	
22 November 2022	FW	(England)	Tommy Blennerhassett	(England) Tring Athletic	Work Experience	
22 November 2022	DF	(England)	Edward Gyamfi	(England) Bedford Town	22 December 2022	
22 November 2022	DF	(England)	Charlie Waller	(England) Tring Athletic	Work Experience	
Winter
6 January 2023	MF	(England)	Brooklyn Ilunga	(England) Wealdstone	16 March 2023 (Note: On 16 March, Ilunga returned to the club after his loan was cut short due to him sustaining a season-ending injury)	
7 January 2023	DF	(England)	Jack Davies	(England) Oxford City	End of Season	
13 January 2023	MF	(England)	Joel Anker	(England) AFC Rushden & Diamonds	13 February 2023	
13 January 2023	DF	(England)	Charlie Waller	(England) AFC Rushden & Diamonds	13 February 2023	
27 January 2023	CF	(England)	Matthew Dennis	(England) Sutton United	End of Season	
31 January 2023	AM	(England)	Dan Kemp	(England) Hartlepool United	End of Season	
