= Henry Lawrence (footballer) =

English footballer

Personal information
- Date of birth: 21 September 2001 (age 25)
- Place of birth: Southwark, England
- Height: 1.71 m (5 ft 7 in)
- Position: Right back

Team information
- Current team: Standard Liège
- Number: 18

Youth career
- –2021: Chelsea

Senior career*
Years	Team	Apps	(Gls)
2021–2023	Chelsea	0	(0)
2021–2022	→ AFC Wimbledon (loan)	24	(0)
2022–2023	→ Milton Keynes Dons (loan)	26	(1)
2023–2024	SL16 FC	18	(0)
2024–	Standard Liège	65	(3)

International career
2019	England U19	1	(0)
2020–2021	England U20	4	(0)
- * Club domestic league appearances and goals as of 31 May 2026

Henry Lawrence (born 21 September 2001) is an English professional footballer who plays as a right-back for Belgian team Standard Liège.

== Club career ==
Lawrence began his career with Chelsea, moving on loan to AFC Wimbledon in July 2021. On 22 July 2022, Lawrence joined League One club Milton Keynes Dons on a season-long loan.

On 16 June 2023, Chelsea announced that Lawrence would leave the club when his contract expired at the end of June, and signed a two-year contract with Belgian team Standard Liège on 7 August.

Having spent most of the season playing for SL16 FC in the Challenger Pro League, Lawrence made his first team debut on 25 May 2024, coming on at half time and scoring in a 3–2 defeat to Mechelen.

== International career ==
Lawrence has represented England at under-19 and under-20 levels.

== Career statistics ==
As of 8 May 2023

Appearances and goals by club, season and competition
Club	Season	League			FA Cup		League Cup		Other		Total	
Club	Season	Division	Apps	Goals	Apps	Goals	Apps	Goals	Apps	Goals	Apps	Goals
Chelsea	2021–22	Premier League	0	0	0	0	0	0	0	0	0	0
Chelsea	2022–23	Premier League	0	0	0	0	0	0	0	0	0	0
Chelsea	Total		0	0	0	0	0	0	0	0	0	0
AFC Wimbledon (loan)	2021–22	League One	24	0	3	0	3	0	2	0	32	0
Milton Keynes Dons (loan)	2022–23	League One	26	1	2	0	4	0	3	1	35	2
Career total			50	1	5	0	7	0	5	1	67	2
