= Bring the House Down =

2025 book

- Authors: Charlotte Runcie
- Language: English
- Publisher: The Borough Press
- Publication date: 8 July 2025
- Publication place: United Kingdom
- Pages: 304
- ISBN: 9780385551076

Bring the House Down is a 2025 novel by British journalist Charlotte Runcie.

== Summary ==
The novel is set during the Edinburgh Fringe Festival. It focuses on two art critics, the meek struggling new mother Sophie Ridgen and the bombastic bigshot nepo baby Alex Lyons. After Lyons gives one of the performances at the festival a scathing review (and after Lyons sleep with the artist without telling her he planned on giving her a negative review), the artist turns her future performances into an "Alex Lyons Experience," aiming to expose Lyons as a terrible person. As Lyons and the performer clash and spiral around each other, Ridgen is caught in the middle.

== Publication history ==
Charlotte Runcie is a British arts journalist. A graduate of the University of Cambridge, she was longlisted for the 2023 Lucy Cavendish Fiction Prize and had previously won the Foyle Young Poets of the Year Award. In her work as a journalist, she frequently covered the Edinburgh Fringe Festival. Bring the House Down is Runcie's second book and debut novel, released on 8 July 2025. It was published in UK by The Borough Press, in the United States by Doubleday (edited by Cara Reilly), and in Canada by Penguin Canada. The cover was designed by Oliver Munday.

== Themes ==
According to Rebecca Laurence and Lindsay Baker of the BBC, the novel "explores the relationship between artist and critic, and the themes of female rage and cancel culture." Kirkus Reviews described the book as examining themes of "nepotism, misogyny, motherhood, culture, criticism, love, and death."

In an article for The Daily Telegraph, Runcie wrote that she wanted to explore the "unique power dynamics between performers and critics," describing her personal experience as a critic: "there have been plenty of times when I’ve reviewed a show in a way that the person behind it has hated. Sometimes, they’ve let me know about it. I’ve had comedians cheerfully mock me, my family and my personal life on stage for months and even years after I’ve reviewed them. I’ve received long, anguished emails from TV presenters calling me “disappointingly shallow” after I’d said their documentaries were opaque and navel-gazing. To some extent – and somewhat paradoxically – receiving criticism is an inevitable part of being a critic. But sometimes, a negative critical response can drive creative people into the realm of irrational fury."

== Critical reception ==
Rebecca Laurence and Lindsay Baker of the BBC named the book as one of their top 25 books of 2025.

Kirkus Reviews described the novel as "smart," saying that it was "an unusual, thought-provoking, multilayered read that book groups will enjoy debating." Publishers Weekly also reviewed the book as "clever," saying that it was a "thought-provoking look at art’s complex relationship with criticism and public outrage. This dramedy packs a punch." Toby Litt of The Guardian reviewed the novel as "entertaining and very timely... one of the most enjoyable novels I’ve read in a long time." Hannah Korbel of The Chicago Review of Books reviewed the novel as "formidable," adding that "there were multiple instances throughout this novel that had me wishing I was reading with a book club rather than with just a pen in hand." Malcolm Forbes of The Washington Post reviewed the novel as "smart, sharp and compulsively readable," saying that "Runcie strikes a perfect balance, and instead of tub-thumping or finger-pointing, explores each issue with nuance and evenhandedness. She is especially insightful on both the criticism of art and the art of criticism."

Laura Mills of The Los Angeles Times wrote that the book missed an opportunity to more deeply examine its themes and criticised it for telling instead of showing Lyons's supposed charisma, but said that "this deeply entertaining novel is nonetheless well worth the price of admission." Jesse Green of The New York Times gave the novel three out of five stars, describing it as "a pleasant ride smack in the middle" that "sidesteps the most interesting question I wish it would answer. Should critics tell their absolute truth, even if it hurts?" Writing in The Irish Times, John Boyne compared the novel to the British TV series Adolescence, describing it as "a powerful read," albeit saying that Runcie "allows Sophie’s festival anecdotes to feel more like autobiography than fiction."

Stuart Kelly of The Scotsman wrote that Runcie "seems too nice to exploit the story’s potential."
