= Runaway (2009 serial) =

British television miniseries

- Created by: Paul Wilmshurst
- Directed by: Paul Wilmshurst
- Starring: William Miller; Saffron Coomber; Kierston Wareing; Adrian Bower; Jack Scanlon; Haydon Downing
- Country of origin: United Kingdom
- No. of episodes: 3

Production
- Executive producer: Jon East
- Running time: 28 minutes

Original release
- Network: CBBC
- Release: 19 March – 29 March 2009

Runaway is the story of a young boy, who takes to the streets to get away from the torment he suffers at school and daily problems at home. Life at home is rife with daily doses of scoldings from his half-drunk mother, and his two younger brothers Dean and Jack pay him scant attention until noticing he is missing. On his journey, Sean meets a girl named Molly, who takes him to a crumbling mill where her family lives. The series follows the police search for Sean, and how his disappearance affects his family.

Runaways was part of a short season on CBBC about children and homelessness, along with a 5-part documentary "Sofa Surfers". The program was first shown as three separated half-hour episodes in March 2009, and later as an 82-minute film.

== Cast ==
Character	Actor	Episode(s)	Biography
Sean Davies	William Miller	1–3	Central character of the series.
Molly	Saffron Coomber	1–3	Second central character
Kelly Davies	Kierston Wareing	1–3	Sean's mother
Gary	Adrian Bower	1–3	Kelly's boyfriend
Dean Davies	Jack Scanlon	1–3	One of Sean's younger brothers
Jack Davies	Haydon Downing	1–3	Sean's other younger brother
PC Brinkley	Manjinder Virk	2	Policeman who helps Kelly find her son
Edward	Michael Culkin		
Caseworker	George Anton		Caseworker
Bully	Alfie Brown-Sykes	1–3	Classmate who threatens and torments Sean
Teenager in Park	Joe Siffleet	2	Boy in park
Farmer	Howard Coggins		Farmer
TV Interviewer	Josie D'Arby	3	
Shopkeeper	Indira Joshi	2	A woman with bad eyesight
Sam	Sean Kelly		

== Episodes ==
No.	Title	Original release date
1	"Episode 1"	19 March 2009
Sean, due to bullying at school and problems at home, flees to the streets around 11 pm. Guest Stars: Tara Keatley as Teacher, Ashley Rolfe as Goth 1 and Kyle Summercorn as Goth 2.
2	"Episode 2"	26 March 2009
Sean and Molly, a runaway girl, shoplift sweets to survive. Sean's mother is devastated. Guest Star: Gary Carr as Surveillance Clerk
3	"Episode 3"	29 March 2009
Sean and Molly befriend an old man who offers them a lift in his boat, to find Molly's house, but the mood turns hostile when Molly insults him. Guest Stars: Josie D'Arby as TV Interviewer
