= 2016–17 Burton Albion F.C. season =

Burton Albion
2016–17 season
- Chairman: Ben Robinson
- Manager: Nigel Clough
- Stadium: Pirelli Stadium
- Championship: 20th
- FA Cup: Third round
- League Cup: Second round
- Top goalscorer: League: Jackson Irvine (10); All: Jackson Irvine (10)
- Highest home attendance: 6,746
- Lowest home attendance: 3,725
- Average home league attendance: 5,228
Home colours	Away colours

The 2016–17 season was Burton Albion's 67th season in their history and first ever in the Championship after gaining promotion the previous season. Along with competing in the Championship, the club also participated in the FA Cup and EFL Cup. The club finished 20th in the league table, was knocked out the third round of the FA Cup and knocked out of the second round of the EFL Cup. The season covered the period from 1 July 2016 to 30 June 2017.

== Statistics ==
As of 25 May 2017

No.	Pos	Nat	Player	Total		Championship		FA Cup		League Cup	
No.	Pos	Nat	Player	Apps	Goals	Apps	Goals	Apps	Goals	Apps	Goals
1	GK	(Scotland) SCO	Jon McLaughlin	45	0	43+0	0	1+0	0	1+0	0
2	DF	(Northern Ireland) NIR	Tom Flanagan	33	0	23+8	0	1+0	0	0+1	0
3	DF	(England) ENG	John Brayford	34	0	33+0	0	1+0	0	0+0	0
4	MF	(England) ENG	John Mousinho	32	0	28+4	0	0+0	0	0+0	0
5	DF	(England) ENG	Kyle McFadzean	34	1	29+2	1	1+0	0	2+0	0
6	DF	(England) ENG	Ben Turner	39	0	38+1	0	0+0	0	0+0	0
7	MF	(Jamaica) JAM	Lee Williamson	16	0	8+6	0	1+0	0	1+0	0
8	FW	(England) ENG	Chris O'Grady	26	1	22+4	1	0+0	0	0+0	0
9	FW	(England) ENG	Marvin Sordell	20	4	18+2	4	0+0	0	0+0	0
10	FW	(England) ENG	Lucas Akins	43	6	31+9	6	0+1	0	1+1	0
11	MF	(England) ENG	Lloyd Dyer	43	7	37+4	7	1+0	0	1+0	0
12	FW	(England) ENG	Cauley Woodrow	13	4	10+3	4	0+0	0	0+0	0
13	GK	(England) ENG	Stephen Bywater	6	0	3+2	0	0+0	0	1+0	0
14	DF	(Republic of Ireland) IRL	Damien McCrory	19	0	12+5	0	0+0	0	2+0	0
15	MF	(England) ENG	Tom Naylor	36	3	23+10	3	1+0	0	2+0	0
16	MF	(England) ENG	Matt Palmer	39	1	31+5	1	1+0	0	0+2	0
18	MF	(England) ENG	Will Miller	15	1	3+11	1	1+0	0	0+0	0
19	FW	(England) ENG	Luke Varney	16	2	4+11	2	1+0	0	0+0	0
22	MF	(England) ENG	Marcus Harness	13	0	0+10	0	1+0	0	1+1	0
24	MF	(Denmark) DEN	Lasse Vigen Christensen	17	0	16+1	0	0+0	0	0+0	0
25	DF	(England) ENG	Shaun Barker	5	0	0+5	0	0+0	0	0+0	0
28	MF	(England) ENG	Michael Kightly	12	4	10+2	4	0+0	0	0+0	0
30	MF	(England) ENG	Luke Murphy	20	1	18+1	1	0+1	0	0+0	0
36	MF	(Australia) AUS	Jackson Irvine	43	10	40+1	10	0+0	0	2+0	0
Player(s) out on loan:
17	MF	(Republic of Ireland) IRL	Callum Reilly	1	1	0+0	0	0+0	0	1+0	1
20	DF	(England) ENG	Phil Edwards	1	0	0+0	0	0+0	0	1+0	0
21	MF	(England) ENG	Ben Fox	2	0	0+1	0	0+0	0	0+1	0
Player(s) who left the club:
9	FW	(England) ENG	Stuart Beavon	12	1	5+5	0	0+0	0	2+0	1
12	MF	(England) ENG	Calum Butcher	3	1	0+1	0	0+0	0	2+0	1
12	FW	(Northern Ireland) NIR	Jamie Ward	19	4	15+3	4	0+1	0	0+0	0
19	MF	(England) ENG	Hamza Choudhury	15	0	6+7	0	0+0	0	2+0	0

=== Goals record ===
As of 25 May 2017

Rank	No.	Nat.	Po.	Name	Championship	FA Cup	League Cup	Total
1	36	(Australia)	DM	Jackson Irvine	10	0	0	10
2	11	(England)	LW	Lloyd Dyer	7	0	0	7
3	10	(England)	CF	Lucas Akins	6	0	0	6
4	12	(England)	CF	Cauley Woodrow	5	0	0	5
5	9	(England)	CF	Marvin Sordell	4	0	0	4
5	28	(England)	LM	Michael Kightly	4	0	0	4
7	~~12~~	(Northern Ireland)	LW	Jamie Ward	4	0	0	4
7	15	(England)	CM	Tom Naylor	3	0	0	3
9	19	(England)	CF	Luke Varney	2	0	0	2
11	5	(England)	CB	Kyle McFadzean	1	0	0	1
11	8	(England)	CF	Chris O'Grady	1	0	0	1
11	~~9~~	(England)	CF	Stuart Beavon	0	0	1	1
11	~~12~~	(England)	DM	Calum Butcher	0	0	1	1
11	16	(England)	CM	Matt Palmer	1	0	0	1
11	17	(Republic of Ireland)	CM	Callum Reilly	0	0	1	1
11	18	(England)	AM	Will Miller	1	0	0	1
11	30	(England)	CM	Luke Murphy	1	0	0	1
Total					49	0	3	52

=== Disciplinary record ===
As of 25 May 2017

Rank	No.	Nat.	Po.	Name	Championship			FA Cup			League Cup			Total		
Rank	No.	Nat.	Po.	Name	Yellow card	(yellow card) (yellow-red card)	Red card	Yellow card	(yellow card) (yellow-red card)	Red card	Yellow card	(yellow card) (yellow-red card)	Red card	Yellow card	(yellow card) (yellow-red card)	Red card
1	6	(England)	CB	Ben Turner	12	0	0	0	0	0	0	0	0	12	0	0
2	36	(Australia)	DM	Jackson Irvine	9	0	0	0	0	0	0	0	0	9	0	0
3	15	(England)	CM	Tom Naylor	7	0	0	1	0	0	0	0	0	8	0	0
4	3	(England)	RB	John Brayford	6	0	0	1	0	0	0	0	0	7	0	0
4	4	(England)	CM	John Mousinho	7	0	0	0	0	0	0	0	0	7	0	0
6	2	(Northern Ireland)	LB	Tom Flanagan	4	1	0	1	0	0	0	0	0	5	1	0
6	5	(England)	CB	Kyle McFadzean	6	0	0	0	0	0	0	0	0	6	0	0
6	~~12~~	(Northern Ireland)	LW	Jamie Ward	6	0	0	0	0	0	0	0	0	6	0	0
9	8	(England)	CF	Chris O'Grady	4	0	0	0	0	0	0	0	0	4	0	0
10	10	(England)	CF	Lucas Akins	3	0	0	0	0	0	0	0	0	3	0	0
10	30	(England)	CM	Luke Murphy	3	0	0	0	0	0	0	0	0	3	0	0
12	9	(England)	CF	Marvin Sordell	2	0	0	0	0	0	0	0	0	2	0	0
12	16	(England)	CM	Matt Palmer	2	0	0	0	0	0	0	0	0	2	0	0
12	~~19~~	(England)	DM	Hamza Choudhury	1	0	0	0	0	0	1	0	0	2	0	0
12	19	(England)	CF	Luke Varney	2	0	0	0	0	0	0	0	0	2	0	0
16	1	(Scotland)	GK	John McLaughlin	1	0	0	0	0	0	0	0	0	1	0	0
16	7	(Jamaica)	CM	Lee Williamson	0	0	0	0	0	0	1	0	0	1	0	0
16	11	(England)	LW	Lloyd Dyer	1	0	0	0	0	0	0	0	0	1	0	0
16	14	(Republic of Ireland)	CB	Damien McCrory	1	0	0	0	0	0	0	0	0	1	0	0
16	24	(Denmark)	CM	Lasse Vigen Christensen	1	0	0	0	0	0	0	0	0	1	0	0
16	25	(England)	CB	Shaun Barker	1	0	0	0	0	0	0	0	0	1	0	0
16	28	(England)	LW	Michael Kightly	1	0	0	0	0	0	0	0	0	1	0	0
Total				78	1	0	3	0	0	2	0	0	83	1	0	

== Transfers ==
=== In ===
Date from	Position	Nationality	Name	From	Fee	Ref.
1 July 2016	CB	ENG	Ben Turner	Cardiff City	Free transfer	
12 July 2016	CB	ENG	Kyle McFadzean	Milton Keynes Dons	Undisclosed	
15 July 2016	DM	AUS	Jackson Irvine	Ross County	£330,000	
25 July 2016	CB	IRL	Ryan Delaney	Wexford Youths	Free transfer	
25 July 2016	LM	ENG	Lloyd Dyer	Burnley	Free transfer	
25 July 2016	CM	JAM	Lee Williamson	Blackburn Rovers	Free transfer	
25 August 2016	GK	ENG	Harry Campbell	Bolton Wanderers	Free transfer	
26 August 2016	DF	ENG	Shaun Barker	Derby County	Free transfer	
1 January 2017	CF	ENG	Marvin Sordell	Coventry City	Free transfer	
4 January 2017	LW	ENG	Luke Varney	Ipswich Town	Free transfer	

=== Out ===
Date from	Position	Nationality	Name	To	Fee	Ref.
1 July 2016	RW	ENG	Sam Austin	Kidderminster Harriers (Note: Following Sam Austin being released, he later signed for Kidderminster Harriers.)	Released	
1 July 2016	LB	AUS	Shane Cansdell-Sherriff	Manly United (Note: Following Shane Cansdell-Sherriff being released, he later signed for Manly United.)	Released	
1 July 2016	CB	ENG	Darius Charles	AFC Wimbledon	Free transfer	
1 July 2016	GK	ENG	Dean Lyness	Blackpool (Note: Following Dean Lyness being released, he later signed for Blackpool.)	Released	
1 July 2016	CB	IRL	Anthony O'Connor	Aberdeen	Mutual consent	
1 July 2016	RM	ENG	Mark Shelton	Ilkeston (Note: Following Mark Shelton being released, he later signed for Ilkeston.)	Released	
1 July 2016	CB	ENG	Liam Slade	North Ferriby United (Note: Following Liam Slade being released, he later signed for North Ferriby United.)	Released	
1 July 2016	CB	ENG	George Taft	Mansfield Town	Free transfer	
1 July 2016	CF	GER	Timmy Thiele	Carl Zeiss Jena (Note: Following Timmy Thiele being released, he later signed for Carl Zeiss Jena.)	Released	
1 July 2016	CM	NIR	Robbie Weir	Leyton Orient (Note: Following Robbie Weir being released, he later signed for Leyton Orient.)	Released	
26 July 2016	CM	ENG	Nathan Ferguson	Port Vale	Free transfer	
25 August 2016	DM	ENG	Calum Butcher	Millwall	Undisclosed	
1 January 2017	CF	ENG	Stuart Beavon	Coventry City	Free transfer	

=== Loans in ===
Date from	Position	Nationality	Name	From	Date until	Ref.
16 July 2016	CF	ENG	Chris O'Grady	Brighton & Hove Albion	End of Season	
6 August 2016	DM	ENG	Hamza Choudhury	Leicester City	End of Season	
19 August 2016	RB	ENG	John Brayford	Sheffield United	End of Season	
25 August 2016	AM	ENG	William Miller	Tottenham Hotspur	End of Season (Note: On 5 January 2017, William Miller's loan from Tottenham Hotspur was extended until the end of the season.)	
31 August 2016	LW	NIR	Jamie Ward	Nottingham Forest	20 January 2017 (Note: On 20 January 2017, Jamie Ward's season-long loan was terminated.)	
6 January 2017	CM	ENG	Luke Murphy	Leeds United	End of Season	
27 January 2017	CM	DEN	Lasse Vigen Christensen	Fulham	End of Season	
27 January 2017	CF	ENG	Cauley Woodrow	Fulham	End of Season	
31 January 2017	LW	ENG	Michael Kightly	Burnley	End of Season	

=== Loans out ===
Date from	Position	Nationality	Name	To	Date until	Ref.
1 July 2016	GK	ENG	Sam Hornby	Kidderminster Harriers	End of Season	
19 August 2016	RB	ENG	Phil Edwards	Oxford United	End of Season	
21 October 2016	DF	ENG	Charlie Gatter	Spalding United	19 November 2016	
1 January 2017	CM	IRL	Callum Reilly	Coventry City	End of Season	

== Competitions ==
=== Pre-season friendlies ===
13 July 2016 Friendly	Leek Town	0–2	Burton Albion	Leek
19:30 BST		Report	Harness 34'; Flanagan 76'	Stadium: Harrison Park

16 July 2016 Friendly	Burton Albion	3–0	Stoke City	Burton upon Trent
15:00 BST	O'Grady 48', 58'; Akins 87'	Report		Stadium: Pirelli Stadium

19 July 2016 Friendly	Kidderminster Harriers	0–2	Burton Albion	Kidderminster
19:30 BST		Report	Harness 7', 60' (pen.)	Stadium: Aggborough; Attendance: 607 (80 away)

22 July 2016 Friendly	Exeter City	1–0	Burton Albion	Exeter
19:30 BST	Watkins 56'	Report		Stadium: St James Park; Attendance: 768

23 July 2016 Friendly	Matlock Town	1–2	Burton Albion	Matlock
14:00 BST	Newsham 27'	Report	Harness 12', 79'	Stadium: Causeway Lane

26 July 2016 Friendly	Burton Albion	1–1	Queens Park Rangers	Burton upon Trent
19:45 BST	Beavon 57'	Report	Onuoha 36'	Stadium: Pirelli Stadium; Attendance: 1,806

27 July 2016 Friendly	Buxton	1–1	Burton Albion	Buxton
19:45 BST	Bennett 2'	Report	Akins 70'	Stadium: The Silverlands

29 July 2016 Friendly	Gresley	3–2	Burton Albion	Church Gresley
19:30 BST	Meade 12', 31'; Morris 48'	Report	Harnes 57'; Garnett 79'	Stadium: Moat Ground

2 August 2016 Friendly	Mickleover Sports	1–0	Burton Albion	Mickleover
19:30 BST	Minot 68'			Stadium: The Don Amott Arena

=== Championship ===
==== League table ====
Pos	Team	Pld	W	D	L	GF	GA	GD	Pts	Promotion, qualification or relegation
18	Queens Park Rangers	46	15	8	23	52	66	−14	53	
19	Birmingham City	46	13	14	19	45	64	−19	53	
20	Burton Albion	46	13	13	20	49	63	−14	52	
21	Nottingham Forest	46	14	9	23	62	72	−10	51	
22	Blackburn Rovers (R)	46	12	15	19	53	65	−12	51	Relegation to EFL League One

Source: English Football League, Soccerway
Rules for classification: 1) Points; 2) Goal difference; 3) Number of goals scored; 4) Points in head-to-head matches; 5) Goal difference in head-to-head matches; 6) Goals scored in head-to-head matches; 7) Play-off.
(R) Relegated

==== Matches ====
6 August 2016 1	Nottingham Forest	4–3	Burton Albion	West Bridgford
15:00 BST	Mills (yellow card) 13'; Assombalonga 23', 77'; Lansbury (yellow card) 35'; Lam 45+1'; Burke 49'	Report	Akins 27'; Dyer 30'; Turner (yellow card) 33'; Choudhury (yellow card) 40'; Naylor 90'	Stadium: City Ground; Attendance: 23,012; Referee: Andy Woolmer

13 August 2016 2	Burton Albion	1–2	Bristol City	Burton upon Trent
15:00 BST	Flanagan (yellow card) 66'; Naylor 88'	Report	Tomlin (yellow card) 35'; Abraham 44', 90+4'	Stadium: Pirelli Stadium; Attendance: 4,579

16 August 2016 3	Burton Albion	3–1	Sheffield Wednesday	Burton upon Trent
19:45 BST	McFadzean 7'; Irvine 45+2'; Dyer 77'; Turner (yellow card) 90'	Report	Hunt (yellow card) 7'; Hooper 12' (pen.)	Stadium: Pirelli Stadium; Attendance: 4,997; Referee: Neil Swarbrick

20 August 2016 4	Blackburn Rovers	2–2	Burton Albion	Blackburn
15:00 BST	Graham (yellow card) 15'; Conway 25'; Lowe (yellow card) 58'; Gallagher 61'	Report	Irvine 43'; Mousinho (yellow card) 49'; Naylor 88'	Stadium: Ewood Park; Attendance: 10,356; Referee: Peter Bankes

26 August 2016 5	Burton Albion	1–0	Derby County	Burton upon Trent
19:45 BST	Irvine 12'; Turner (yellow card) 89'	Report	Bryson (yellow card) 78'	Stadium: Pirelli Stadium; Attendance: 6,746

10 September 2016 6	Wolverhampton Wanderers	1–1	Burton Albion	Wolverhampton
15:00 BST	Stearman (yellow card) 52'; Costa (yellow card) 66'; Oniangué 77'; Coady (yellow card) 82'	Report	Turner (yellow card) 40'; Naylor (yellow card) 54'; Miller 90+3'; Brayford (yellow card) 90+4'	Stadium: Molineux Stadium; Attendance: 22,049; Referee: James Adcock

13 September 2016 7	Fulham	1–1	Burton Albion	London
19:45 BST	Sigurðsson (yellow card) 81'; Sessegnon 90+3'; Jozabed (yellow card) 90+3'	Report	Irvine 51' (yellow card) 90+7'; Turner (yellow card) 75'; Ward (yellow card) 90+1'	Stadium: Craven Cottage; Attendance: 15,288; Referee: Tim Robinson

17 September 2016 8	Burton Albion	0–1	Brighton & Hove Albion	Burton upon Trent
15:00 BST	Naylor (yellow card) 55'	Report	Stephens (yellow card) 50'; Hemed 88' (pen.); Bong (yellow card) 90+3'	Stadium: Pirelli Stadium; Attendance: 4,756; Referee: Geoff Eltringham

24 September 2016 9	Norwich City	3–1	Burton Albion	Norwich
15:00 BST	Martin Olsson 29' (yellow card) 62'; Jacob Murphy 47'; Hoolahan (yellow card) 83'; Ivo Pinto 89'	Report	Naylor (yellow card) 33'; Akins 46'; Ward (yellow card) 50'; Flanagan (yellow card) 63' (yellow-red card) 76'	Stadium: Carrow Road; Attendance: 26,104; Referee: Jeremy Simpson

27 September 2016 10	Burton Albion	1–1	Queens Park Rangers	Burton-upon-Trent
19:45 BST	Ward (yellow card) 25' (goal) 58'; Turner (yellow card) 38'	Report	Washington (yellow card) 27'; Bidwell (yellow card) 51'; Polter 70'	Stadium: Pirelli Stadium; Attendance: 3,725; Referee: Scott Duncan

1 October 2016 11	Burton Albion	2–0	Cardiff City	Burton-upon-Trent
15:00 BST	Irvine 12' (yellow card) 84'; Akins 49'	Report		Stadium: Pirelli Stadium; Attendance: 4,426; Referee: Andrew Madley

15 October 2016 12	Wigan Athletic	0–0	Burton Albion	Wigan
15:00 BST		Report	Akins (yellow card) 54'; Brayford (yellow card) 59'; McFadzean (yellow card) 64'	Stadium: The DW Stadium; Attendance: 10,430; Referee: Andrew Davies

18 October 2016 13	Ipswich Town	2–0	Burton Albion	Ipswich
19:45 BST	Chambers 15'; Skuse (yellow card) 35'; Sears 88'	Report	Irvine (yellow card) 21'; Mousinho (yellow card) 80'	Stadium: Portman Road; Attendance: 15,816; Referee: Oliver Langford

21 October 2016 14	Burton Albion	2–0	Birmingham City	Burton-upon-Trent
19:45 BST	Akins (yellow card) 29'; Dyer 32'; Naylor (yellow card) 41'; Irvine (yellow card) 45+1'; Ward 62'	Report	Maghoma (yellow card) 36'; Grounds (yellow card) 64'; Shotton (yellow card) 69'	Stadium: Pirelli Stadium; Attendance: 5,818; Referee: Tim Robinson

29 October 2016 15	Leeds United	2–0	Burton Albion	Leeds
15:00 BST	O'Kane (yellow card) 45+1'; Jansson (yellow card) 76'; Wood 83' (pen.); Ronaldo Vieira (yellow card) 90+4'; Doukara 90+6' (yellow card) 90+7'	Report	Akins (yellow card) 64'; Turner (yellow card) 82'	Stadium: Elland Road; Attendance: 24,220; Referee: Jeremy Simpson

5 November 2016 16	Burton Albion	0–0	Barnsley	Burton-upon-Trent
15:00 GMT	Turner (yellow card) 73'	Report	MacDonald (yellow card) 32'	Stadium: Pirelli Stadium; Attendance: 4,913; Referee: Peter Bankes

19 November 2016 17	Reading	3–0	Burton Albion	Reading
15:00 GMT	Samuel 22' (yellow card) 63'; Williams 29'; McCleary (yellow card) 64'; Brayford 77' (o.g.); McShane (yellow card) 90+4'	Report	Turner (yellow card) 44'	Stadium: Madejski Stadium; Attendance: 15,545; Referee: Keith Stroud

26 November 2016 18	Preston North End	1–1	Burton Albion	Preston
15:00 GMT	Johnson (yellow card) 37'; Robinson 45+2'; Cunningham (yellow card) 85'; Pearson (yellow card) 90'	Report	Irvine 23'; Mousinho (yellow card) 77'; O'Grady (yellow card) 79'	Stadium: Deepdale Stadium; Attendance: 10,696; Referee: Darren Bond

3 December 2016 19	Burton Albion	2–1	Rotherham United	Burton upon Trent
15:00 GMT	Irvine 15'; Naylor (yellow card) 59'; Palmer 62'	Report	Vaulks (yellow card) 70'; Adeyemi 90+4'	Stadium: Pirelli Stadium; Attendance: 4,446; Referee: Chris Kavanagh

10 December 2016 20	Brentford	2–1	Burton Albion	Brentford
15:00 GMT	Hogan 11', 53'; McEachran (yellow card) 57'; Colin (yellow card) 62'; Bjelland (yellow card) 90+4'; Yennaris (yellow card) 90+7'; Sawyers (yellow card) 90+7'	Report	Ward 27'; Irvine (yellow card) 66'; Mousinho (yellow card) 72'; McLaughlin (yellow card) 90+7'; Turner (yellow card) 90+7'	Stadium: Griffin Park; Attendance: 9,035; Referee: David Coote

13 December 2016 21	Burton Albion	0–1	Huddersfield Town	Burton-upon-Trent
19:45 GMT	Ward (yellow card) 75'; O'Grady (yellow card) 82'; Brayford (yellow card) 85'	Report	Palmer (yellow card) 59'; Hefele (yellow card) 84'; Wells 85'; Cranie (yellow card) 90+4'	Stadium: Pirelli Stadium; Attendance: 4,564; Referee: James Adcock

17 December 2016 22	Burton Albion	1–2	Newcastle United	Burton-upon-Trent
15:00 GMT	Naylor (yellow card) 19'; Dyer 20'; Irvine (yellow card) 45+3'	Report	Gayle 15'; Diamé 34'; Hayden (yellow card) 56'	Stadium: Pirelli Stadium; Attendance: 6,665 + neil McEvoy; Referee: Lee Probert

26 December 2016 23	Aston Villa	2–1	Burton Albion	Birmingham
15:00 GMT	Bacuna 15'; McCormack 78'	Report	Ward 31' (yellow card) 63'; Mousinho (yellow card) 62'	Stadium: Villa Park; Attendance: 41,337; Referee: Stephen Martin

29 December 2016 24	Rotherham United	1–2	Burton Albion	Rotherham
19:45 GMT	Frecklington (yellow card) 33'; Adeyemi 45+3'; Ward (yellow card) 88'	Report	McFadzean (yellow card) 13'; O'Grady 36'; Irvine 41'; Palmer (yellow card) 75'; McCrory (yellow card) 77'; Barker (yellow card) 90+1'	Stadium: AESSEAL New York Stadium; Attendance: 9,806; Referee: Tony Harrington

2 January 2017 25	Burton Albion	0–1	Preston North End	Burton-upon-Trent
15:00 GMT	O'Grady (yellow card) 33'	Report	Clarke 45+1'	Stadium: Pirelli Stadium; Attendance: 5,144; Referee: Oliver Langford

14 January 2017 26	Burton Albion	0–2	Wigan Athletic	Burton-upon-Trent
15:00 GMT	Sordell (yellow card) 33'; Ward (yellow card) 69'	Report	Connolly 45+1', 64' (yellow card) 77'; Buxton (yellow card) 57'; Flores (yellow card) 81'	Stadium: Pirelli Stadium; Attendance: 4,411; Referee: Andrew Madley

21 January 2017 27	Cardiff City	1–0	Burton Albion	Cardiff
15:00 GMT	Healey 90+1'	Report		Stadium: Cardiff City Stadium; Referee: Tim Robinson

28 January 2017 28	Queens Park Rangers	1–2	Burton Albion	Shepherd's Bush
15:00 GMT	Washington 63'; Luongo (yellow card) 86'	Report	Murphy 11'; Christensen (yellow card) 48'; Dyer 52'; Irvine (yellow card) 78'	Stadium: Loftus Road Stadium; Attendance: 12,116; Referee: Geoff Eltringham

1 February 2017 29	Burton Albion	0–2	Fulham	Burton upon Trent
19:45 GMT	O'Grady (yellow card) 67'	Report	Johansen 48'; Malone 71'	Stadium: Pirelli Stadium; Attendance: 3,725; Referee: Tony Harrington

4 February 2017 30	Burton Albion	2–1	Wolverhampton Wanderers	Burton upon Trent
15:00 GMT	Kightly 60'; Murphy (yellow card) 71'; Woodrow 90+3'	Report	Costa 40' (pen.); Stearman (yellow card) 58'; Dicko (yellow card) 89'	Stadium: Pirelli Stadium; Attendance: 5,608; Referee: Keith Stroud

11 February 2017 31	Brighton & Hove Albion	4–1	Burton Albion	Falmer
15:00 GMT	Hemed 12', 57' (pen.); Baldock 47'; Murray 83'	Report	Kightly 75'	Stadium: Falmer Stadium; Attendance: 29,454; Referee: Stephen Martin

18 February 2017 32	Burton Albion	2–1	Norwich City	Burton-upon-Trent
15:00 GMT	Woodrow 25'; Kightly 56'	Report	Jerome 52' (yellow card) 59'	Stadium: Pirelli Stadium; Attendance: 5,263; Referee: Lee Probert

21 February 2017 33	Derby County	0–0	Burton Albion	Derby
19:45 GMT	Ince (yellow card) 85'	Report	Naylor (yellow card) 69'	Stadium: iPro Stadium; Attendance: 31,081; Referee: Simon Hooper

24 February 2017 34	Burton Albion	1–1	Blackburn Rovers	Burton-upon-Trent
19:45 GMT	Sordell 54'; Turner (yellow card) 56'; McFadzean (yellow card) 87'	Report	Palmer 31' (o.g.)	Stadium: Pirelli Stadium; Attendance: 5,496; Referee: James Linington

4 March 2017 35	Bristol City	0–0	Burton Albion	Bristol
15:00 GMT	O'Neil (yellow card) 12'	Report	Murphy (yellow card) 39'; Mousinho (yellow card) 66'; Brayford (yellow card) 67'; McFadzean (yellow card) 89'; Palmer (yellow card) 90+2'	Stadium: Ashton Gate; Attendance: 17,914; Referee: Graham Scott

7 March 2017 36	Sheffield Wednesday	1–1	Burton Albion	Sheffield
19:45 GMT	Wallace 16'	Report	Irvine 24'; McFadzean (yellow card) 52'	Stadium: Hillsborough; Attendance: 24,929; Referee: Peter Bankes

11 March 2017 37	Burton Albion	1–0	Nottingham Forest	Burton upon Trent
15:00 GMT	Woodrow 26'	Report	Brereton (yellow card) 56'	Stadium: Pirelli Stadium; Attendance: 6,115; Referee: Keith Stroud

18 March 2017 38	Burton Albion	3–5	Brentford	Burton upon Trent
15:00 GMT	Sordell 21', 23'; Woodrow 41'	Report	Canós 10', 61'; Vibe 51', 85'; Jota (yellow card) 67' (goal) 86'	Stadium: Pirelli Stadium; Attendance: 4,549; Referee: Andrew Madley

1 April 2017 39	Huddersfield Town	0–1	Burton Albion	Huddersfield
15:00 BST	Whitehead (yellow card) 27' (yellow-red card) 88'; Löwe (yellow card) 90+1'	Report	McFadzean (yellow card) 49'; Brayford (yellow card) 74'; Sordell (yellow card) 79'; Turner (yellow card) 82'; Flanagan (yellow card) 88'; Mousinho (yellow card) 90+4'; Irvine 90+5'	Stadium: The John Smith's Stadium; Attendance: 20,154; Referee: Scott Duncan

5 April 2017 40	Newcastle United	1–0	Burton Albion	Newcastle upon Tyne
19:45 BST	Lascelles (yellow card) 50'; Ritchie 68'	Report		Stadium: St James' Park; Attendance: 48,814; Referee: Keith Stroud

8 April 2017 41	Burton Albion	1–1	Aston Villa	Burton upon Trent
15:00 BST	Irvine (yellow card) 48'; Dyer 61' (yellow card) 62'; Murphy (yellow card) 72'	Report	Kodjia 3'; Jedinak (yellow card) 64'	Stadium: Pirelli Stadium; Attendance: 6,716; Referee: Lee Probert

14 April 2017 42	Burton Albion	1–2	Ipswich Town	Burton upon Trent
19:45 BST	Akins 86' (pen.)	Report	Varney 52' (o.g.); Sears 79' (yellow card) 90+4'	Stadium: Pirelli Stadium; Attendance: 5,236; Referee: Oliver Langford

17 April 2017 43	Birmingham City	0–2	Burton Albion	Birmingham
15:00 BST	Keita (yellow card) 49'; Adams (yellow card) 66'	Report	Dyer 36'; Akins 52'; Irvine (yellow card) 65'	Stadium: St Andrew's; Attendance: 19,794; Referee: Peter Bankes

22 April 2017 44	Burton Albion	2–1	Leeds United	Burton upon Trent
15:00 BST	Sordell 75'; Kightly 77' (yellow card) 89'	Report	Bartley 80'	Stadium: Pirelli Stadium; Attendance: 6,073; Referee: Darren Bond

29 April 2017 45	Barnsley	1–1	Burton Albion	Barnsley
15:00 BST	Jones (yellow card) 32'; Moncur 38'	Report	Flanagan (yellow card) 49'; Varney 52' (yellow card) 85'	Stadium: Oakwell; Attendance: 12,952; Referee: Jeremy Simpson

7 May 2017 46	Burton Albion	2–4	Reading	Burton upon Trent
12:00 BST	Turner 69'; Woodrow 72'; Irvine (yellow card) 77'	Report	Mendes 3'; Obita 21'; Kermorgant 64'; Grabban 84'	Stadium: Pirelli Stadium; Attendance: 6,264; Referee: Simon Hooper

=== FA Cup ===
7 January 2017 Third round	Watford	2–0	Burton Albion	Watford
15:00 GMT	Kabasele 21'; Sinclair 77'	Report	Naylor (yellow card) 45+2'; Flanagan (yellow card) 62'; Brayford (yellow card) 80'	Stadium: Vicarage Road Stadium; Attendance: 13,270; Referee: Lee Mason

=== EFL Cup ===
10 August 2016 First round	Burton Albion	3–2 (a.e.t.)	Bury	Burton upon Trent
19:30 BST	Reilly 36'; Beavon 105'; Butcher 113'	Report	Jones (yellow card) 16'; Pope 48' (yellow card) 76'; Mellis (yellow card) 75'; Maher 120'	Stadium: Pirelli Stadium; Attendance: 1,523; Referee: Mark Heywood

23 August 2016 Second round	Burton Albion	0–5	Liverpool	Burton upon Trent
19:45 BST	Choudhury (yellow card) 57'; Williamson (yellow card) 61'	Report	Origi 15'; Firmino 22'; Naylor 61' (o.g.); Sturridge 78', 83'	Stadium: Pirelli Stadium; Attendance: 6,450; Referee: Simon Hooper
