= The House of Special Purpose =

The House of Special Purpose may refer to:

- Ipatiev House, a house in Yekaterinburg where Tsar Nicholas II of Russia and his family were murdered, and which is known as The House of Special Purpose
- The House of Special Purpose (Fargo), a 2017 episode of the American television series Fargo
- The House of Special Purpose (novel), a 2009 novel by John Boyne
