= Jack Scanlon =

English former child actor

- Born: 6 August 1998 (age 27); Canterbury, Kent, England
- Years active: 2007–2010
- Notable work: The Boy in the Striped Pyjamas (2008)

Jack Charles Scanlon (born 6 August 1998) is an English former child actor who is best known for his role in the 2008 Holocaust film The Boy in the Striped Pyjamas.

== Background ==
Jack Charles Scanlon was born in Canterbury, Kent then moved to Deal, also in Kent, with his parents and younger brother. He went to Sir Roger Manwood's School in Sandwich, northwest of Deal. He also attended Bath Spa University in Bath where he studied Commercial Music.

== Career ==
He auditioned for The Boy in the Striped Pajamas through his drama club and was eventually cast as Shmuel after director Mark Herman narrowed his choice down to about three possible candidates pairing each with Asa Butterfield for a last audition. According to Herman, "Jack and Asa played very well against one another."

Although The Boy in the Striped Pajamas was Scanlon's feature film debut, he had acted before. He appeared in a 10-minute short film titled The Eye of the Butterfly (leading to him being suggested to the casting director of The Boy in the Striped Pyjamas) and in a 2007 episode of the Peter Serafinowicz Show. Scanlon also played the younger brother of main character Sean (William Miller) in the 2009 British children's miniseries Runaway, broadcast on BBC One, which was part of the CBBC season about homelessness.

== Filmography ==
=== Film ===
Year	Title	Roles	Notes
2008	The Boy in the Striped Pyjamas	Shmuel	

=== Television ===
Year	Programme	Role	Notes
2007	Peter Serafinowicz Show	Various roles	1 episode
2009	Runaway	Dean	3 episodes
2010	Married Single Other	Joe	6 episodes

== Accolades ==
Year	Award	Category	Recipient(s)	Result
2008	Young Artist Awards	Best Leading Performance (International Feature Film)	Asa Butterfield & Jack Scanlon	Nominated
