= The Boy in the Striped Pyjamas (film) =

2008 historical drama film by Mark Herman

- UK theatrical release poster
- Directed by: Mark Herman
- Written by: Mark Herman
- Based on: The Boy in the Striped Pyjamas by John Boyne
- Produced by: David Heyman
- Starring: Vera Farmiga; David Thewlis; Rupert Friend
- Cinematography: Benoît Delhomme
- Edited by: Michael Ellis
- Music by: James Horner
- Production companies: Miramax Films; BBC Films; Heyday Films
- Distributed by: Miramax Films (United States); Walt Disney Studios Motion Pictures (International)
- Release dates: 28 August 2008 (Carnegie Film Festival); 12 September 2008 (United Kingdom); 26 November 2008 (United States)
- Running time: 94 minutes
- Countries: United Kingdom; United States
- Language: English
- Budget: $12.5 million
- Box office: $44.1 million

The Boy in the Striped Pyjamas (released as The Boy in the Striped Pajamas in North America) is a 2008 Holocaust historical drama film written and directed by Mark Herman. It is based on the 2006 novel of the same name by John Boyne. Set in Nazi Germany, the film follows the son of a Schutzstaffel (SS) officer who befriends a Jewish prisoner of his age.

It was released in the United Kingdom on 12 September 2008. It received generally positive reviews from critics for its emotional weight, mature themes and acting but was panned by scholars for misrepresenting elements of the Holocaust.

== Plot ==
Bruno, an eight-year-old German boy living in Berlin, is uprooted to the countryside with his family after his father Ralf, an SS officer, is promoted. The boy notices an extermination camp from his bedroom window, but believes it to be a farm. His mother Elsa forbids him from going in the back garden.

Ralf arranges for Herr Liszt, a private tutor, to home school Bruno and his elder sister, Gretel. Liszt's anti-semitic teachings and Gretel's crush on her father's subordinate, Lieutenant Kurt Kotler, make her a fanatical Nazi supporter. Bruno struggles to absorb the racist rhetoric after Pavel, a Jewish doctor-turned-family slave, tends to a minor injury Bruno suffers. Bruno's explorations of nearby woods takes him to a barbed wire fence surrounding the camp where he befriends Shmuel, a boy his age. They meet at the fence regularly, and Bruno learns Shmuel is a Jew brought to the camp with his parents. Bruno sneaks him food.

Kotler inadvertently reveals to Elsa that the smell from the camp is from the crematoria, and she angrily confronts her husband. When Kotler reveals his father left Germany for Switzerland to avoid national service, Ralf berates him, and Kotler in turn beats Pavel for spilling a glass of wine.

Bruno sees Shmuel working in his home and offers him cake. Kotler finds them talking and berates Shmuel. After seeing him eating, Shmuel informs Kotler that Bruno offered the cake, which he fearfully denies. Later, Bruno tries to apologise to Shmuel, but he does not reappear at the fence for several days. A short time after, Bruno clandestinely watches his father and other officers reviewing a propaganda film depicting the camp's conditions as positive. Shmuel eventually reappears at the fence, but with visible injuries. Bruno apologises to Shmuel, who forgives him.

Kotler gets transferred to the Eastern Front for his refusal to turn his father in. And Ralf's mother, who disapproves of the Nazi regime, is killed by an Allied bombing raid on Berlin. At the funeral, Elsa tries to remove a wreath from the Führer out of respect for her and her beliefs. Ralf stops her, and they quarrel. Elsa informs Ralf she does not want the children living in the vicinity of the camp and Ralf tells Bruno and Gretel their mother is taking them to live with their aunt and extended family in Heidelberg until the war is over. Bruno visits Shmuel before he leaves, and on learning Shmuel's father has disappeared from a work party, decides to help Shmuel find him. Shmuel provides Bruno with a prisoner's striped outfit and cap, but they are captured by the guards after Bruno digs into camp under the fence.

Gretel and Elsa burst into Ralf's office during a meeting when they realise Bruno is missing. A search dog tracks Bruno's scent to his discarded clothing by the wire. Ralf enters the camp as a group of prisoners are processed in a gas chamber for extermination by pesticide gas. Bruno and Shmuel are killed, leaving Ralf, Elsa, and Gretel devastated.

== Cast ==
- Asa Butterfield as Bruno, a young German boy
- Vera Farmiga as Elsa, Bruno's mother
- David Thewlis as Ralf, Bruno's father
- Jack Scanlon as Shmuel, a young Jewish boy
- Amber Beattie as Gretel, Bruno's older sister
- Rupert Friend as Lieutenant Kurt Kotler
- David Hayman as Pavel, a concentration camp prisoner
- Sheila Hancock as Nathalie, Bruno's grandmother
- Richard Johnson as Matthias, Bruno's grandfather
- Cara Horgan as Maria
- Jim Norton as Herr Liszt

== Production ==
=== Filming ===
Filming occurred during 29 April 2007 to 7 July 2007, in Hungary. Locations included Kerepesi Cemetery in Budapest, Sacelláry Castle in Budafok and several other areas of Budapest. Interiors were filmed at Fót Studios, Budapest. Post-production was completed in London. The total cost of the production was approximately $12.4 million.

== Soundtrack ==
The Boy in the Striped Pajamas: Original Motion Picture Soundtrack

Soundtrack album by James Horner
- Released: 2008
- Recorded: 2008
- Studios: Eastwood Scoring Stage, Warner Bros. Studios
- Length: 52:25
- Label: Hollywood
- Producer: James Horner

The Boy in the Striped Pyjamas: Original Motion Picture Soundtrack is the licensed soundtrack album to the film. The score was composed by James Horner. It was released through Hollywood Records in 2008.

=== Track list ===
No.	Name	Length
1	Boys Playing Airplanes	4:08
2	Exploring the Forest	2:32
3	The Train Ride to a New Home	3:30
4	The Winds Gently Blow Through the Garden	5:52
5	An Odd Discovery Beyond the Trees	2:48
6	Dolls Are Not for Big Girls, Propaganda Is...	3:40
7	Black Smoke	1:42
8	Evening Supper—A Family Slowly Crumbles	7:48
9	The Funeral	1:50
10	The Boys' Plans, from Night to Day	2:35
11	Strange New Clothes	9:50
12	Remembrance, Remembrance	5:29

== Reception ==
=== Box office ===
The film opening on 12 September 2008 in the United Kingdom with $253,085 at the box office in 17 theatres. It later opened for a limited time on 26 November 2008 in North America.

The Boy in the Striped Pyjamas grossed a worldwide total of $44.1 million.

=== Critical response ===
The Boy in the Striped Pyjamas has a 65% approval rating on Rotten Tomatoes, based on 145 reviews, with an average rating of 6.30/10. The site's critical consensus reads, "A touching and haunting family film that deals with the Holocaust in an arresting and unusual manner, and packs a brutal final punch of a twist." On Metacritic, the film has a normalised score of 55 out of 100, based on 28 critics, indicating "mixed or average reviews".

James Christopher, of The Times, referred to the film as "a hugely affecting film. Important, too". Manohla Dargis, of The New York Times, said the film "trivialized, glossed over, kitsched up, commercially exploited and hijacked [the Holocaust] for a tragedy about a Nazi family".

In the Chicago Sun-Times, Roger Ebert gave the film three and a half out of four and said that it is not simply a reconstruction of Germany during the war, but is "about a value system that survives like a virus".

Kelly Jane Torrance in the Washington Times said the film was moving and beautifully told. In spite of some criticism, Ty Burr of The Boston Globe filed this conclusion: "what saves The Boy in the Striped Pajamas from kitsch is the cold, observant logic of Herman's storytelling".

=== Scholarly reception ===
Scholars have criticised the film, saying that it obscures the historical facts about the Holocaust and creates a false equivalence between victims and perpetrators. For example, at the end of the movie, the grief of Bruno's family is depicted, encouraging the viewer to feel sympathy for Holocaust perpetrators. Michael Gray wrote that the story is not very realistic and contains many implausibilities, because children were murdered when they arrived at Auschwitz and it was not possible for them to have contact with people on the outside. Although Gonshak notes that in August 1944 there were 619 male children (but not females) kept at Auschwitz as camp as messengers; while all other female and male children were gassed upon arrival. A study by the Centre for Holocaust Education at University College London found that The Boy in the Striped Pyjamas "is having a significant, and significantly problematic impact on the way young people attempt to make sense of this complex past". However, a more recent study found that the film's reception is strongly based on the viewers' previous knowledge and beliefs.

Research by Holocaust educator Michael Gray found that more than three-quarters of British schoolchildren (ages 13–14) in his sample had engaged with The Boy in the Striped Pyjamas, significantly more than The Diary of Anne Frank (1947). The film was having a significant effect on many of the children's knowledge and beliefs about the Holocaust. The children believed that the story contained a lot of useful information about the Holocaust and conveyed an accurate impression of many real-life events. The majority believed that it was based on a true story. He also found that many students drew false inferences from the film, such as assuming that Germans would not have known anything about the Holocaust because Bruno's family did not, or that the Holocaust had stopped because a Nazi child had accidentally been gassed. Other students believed that Jews had volunteered to go to the camps because they had been fooled by Nazi propaganda, rather than being violently rounded up and deported. Gray recommended studying the book only after children had already learned the major facts about the Holocaust and were less likely to be misled by it, while the University of Huddersfield's Holocaust centre and others recommended that the film be taught only as fiction, with its factual inaccuracies made clear, and recommended that true accounts and works from Jewish authors should be prioritised.

=== Accolades ===
Year	Award	Category	Recipient(s)	Result
2008	British Independent Film Awards	Best Actress	Vera Farmiga	Won
2008	British Independent Film Awards	Best Director	Mark Herman	Nominated
2008	British Independent Film Awards	Most Promising Newcomer	Asa Butterfield	Nominated
2009	Premio Goya	Best European Film	The Boy in the Striped Pyjamas	Nominated
2009	Irish Film and Television Awards	Best International Film	The Boy in the Striped Pyjamas	Nominated
2009	Young Artist Awards	Best Leading Performance (International Feature Film)	Asa Butterfield & Jack Scanlon	Nominated
