= The Boy in the Striped Pyjamas =

2006 novel by John Boyne

- UK first edition book cover
- Author: John Boyne
- Language: English
- Genre: Historical
- Publisher: David Fickling Books
- Publication date: 6 January 2006
- Publication place: Ireland
- Media type: Print (hard cover & paper back)
- Pages: 216
- ISBN: 0-385-60940-X
- OCLC: 62132588
- Dewey Decimal: 823.914 22
- LC Class: CS 2006/45764
- Followed by: All the Broken Places

The Boy in the Striped Pyjamas is a 2006 historical fiction novel by Irish novelist John Boyne. The plot concerns a German boy named Bruno whose father is the commandant of the Auschwitz concentration camp and Bruno's friendship with a Jewish detainee named Shmuel. As of 2022, the book has sold more than 11 million copies worldwide and has been translated into sixty languages, making it one of the best-selling books of all time.

Boyne wrote the entire first draft in two and a half days, without sleeping much; but also said that he was quite a serious student of Holocaust-related literature for years before the idea for the novel even came to him.

The book has received a divided response from critics, with positive reviews praising the story as an effective morality tale. Holocaust scholars, historians and memorial organizations have criticised the book for its historical inaccuracies, which have been deemed potentially damaging to Holocaust education efforts.

The book was a best seller, topping the list in Spain for both 2007 and 2008, and reaching number one on The New York Times Best Seller list in 2008. The book was adapted into a film of the same name in 2008, a ballet in 2017 and an opera entitled A Child in Striped Pyjamas in 2023. A sequel, All the Broken Places, was published in 2022.

== Background ==
John Boyne has described the conception of his novel as an idea popping into his head instantly: "Two boys, the mirror of each other, sitting either side of a wire fence". While the conception of the book came about fast, his inspiration for writing has a more lengthy foundation. Boyne has stated that his style and writing process has been influenced by Malcolm Bradbury at the University of East Anglia, who suggested he write every day without rest days.

Unlike the other novels written by him, Boyne has described how he wrote the first draft of The Boy in the Striped Pyjamas in roughly two and a half days; the idea for the novel came to Boyne on Tuesday, April 27, and then he wrote non-stop until Friday at noon. Boyne then wrote 10 different drafts before sending his book to the editor. While Boyne has said that he was quite a serious student of Holocaust-related literature for years before the idea for the novel even came to him, Boyne also describes his book as a "fable", that relies more on a story of moral truth than historical accuracy.

== Plot ==
Bruno is a nine-year-old boy growing up during World War II in Berlin. He lives with his parents, 12-year-old sister Gretel (whom he has nicknamed "A Hopeless Case"), and maids, one of whom is named Maria and another is a Jewish chef named Pavel. After a visit by Adolf Hitler, whose title the Führer Bruno commonly mispronounces as "Fury", Bruno's father, Ralf, is promoted to Commandant of the death camp Auschwitz, which Bruno mispronounces as "Out-With".

Bruno is initially upset about having to move to Auschwitz and is very sad at the prospect of leaving his "best friends for life", Daniel, Karl, and Martin. From the house at Auschwitz, Bruno sees the camp in which the prisoners' uniforms appear to him to be "striped pyjamas". One day, Bruno decides to explore the wire fence surrounding the camp. He meets a Jewish boy, Shmuel, whom he learns shares his birthday (April 15) and age. Shmuel says that his father, grandfather, and brother are with him on his side of the fence, but he is separated from his mother. Bruno and Shmuel talk and become very good friends although Bruno still does not understand very much about Shmuel or his life. Nearly every day, unless it is raining, Bruno goes to see Shmuel and sneaks him food. Over time, Bruno notices that Shmuel is rapidly losing weight.

Bruno concocts a plan with Shmuel to sneak into the camp to look for Shmuel's father, who has gone missing. Shmuel brings a set of prison clothes and Bruno leaves his own clothes outside the fence. As they search the camp they are captured, added to a group of prisoners on a "march" and led into a gas chamber, which Bruno assumes is simply a rain shelter. In the gas chamber, Bruno apologizes to Shmuel for not finding his father and tells Shmuel that he is his best friend for life. It is not made clear if Shmuel answers before the doors close and the lights go out, although Bruno determines to never let go of Shmuel's hand.

Bruno is never seen or heard from again, his clothes being discovered by a soldier days later. His mother, Elsa, spends months searching for him, even returning to their old home, before at last moving back to Berlin with Gretel, who isolates herself in her room. (Boyne develops Gretel's life in his 2022 novel All The Broken Places.) Ralf spends another year at Auschwitz, becoming ruthless and cold to his subordinates, while haunted by visions of Bruno. He eventually returns to the place where Bruno's clothes were found, discovering the gap in the fence. Deducing how his son disappeared, he collapses to the ground in grief. Months later, Allied troops liberate the camp, and Ralf, wracked with remorse and self-loathing, allows himself to be taken without resistance.

The book ends with the phrase: "Of course, all of this happened a long time ago and nothing like that could ever happen again. Not in this day and age".

== Genre and style ==
The Boy in The Striped Pyjamas fits into the genre of Holocaust fiction and magic realism. Boyne uses general knowledge about the Holocaust to create a self-described "fable", that relies more on a story of moral truth than historical accuracy. This type of literature, as shown in The Boy in the Striped Pyjamas, tends to be told to children, from a child's perspective. By having one child share the "bitter herbs" of history with another, the novel instills moral obligation in children.

Kenneth Kidd, professor of English at the University of Florida, argues that John Boyne's use of fable allows him to explore the darker elements of the Holocaust with more of a cautionary tale resulting.

== Analysis ==
Sophie Melissa Smith, from the University of Southampton argues that writing a factual story as a fable is damaging as it may produce misconceptions about the Holocaust. Examples include the ability of Shmuel to escape work and Bruno's ability to approach an electrified fence.

Smith claims that Boyne lowers the culpability of Nazis like Bruno's father by not just humanizing them but also creating a sense of obligation in characters like Bruno's father, as Bruno's father was a Commandant at a large concentration camp. Additionally, the depiction of the story told through Bruno creates a greater ignorance of the Nazi regime by using words such as "the Fury" in place of the Fuhrer and "Out-with" in place of Auschwitz. Generally, critics see the trivialization of the Nazi regime in this portrayal as damaging to Holocaust education.

=== Educational implications ===
A 2009 study by the London Jewish Cultural Centre conducted a survey in which 70% of respondents thought Boyne's novel was based on a true story. Many students also thought "the tragic death of Bruno brought about the end of concentration camps."

Michael Gray, Director of Studies at Harrow School and author of Contemporary Debates in Holocaust Education and Teaching the Holocaust: Practical Approaches for Ages 11-18, described the book in 2014 as "a curse for Holocaust education." In an opinion column for the Jewish Chronicle, Noah Max criticised Gray: "Gray's 2015 study... [found] that 'respondents almost universally expressed their eagerness for studying the topic and frequently remarked that this [the Shoah] was one of the most interesting periods of history'. (My italics.) His sample of 298 Year 9 students from London and Oxford is perilously narrow given the book's widespread popularity and none of his other findings are anywhere near that substantial. However, even in a sample so small, any 'universal' finding is worthy of close attention."

Criticising the book's accuracy, the Auschwitz-Birkenau State Museum commented in 2020 that the novel "should be avoided by anyone who studies or teaches about the Holocaust." The Melbourne Holocaust Museum, while finding the book a powerful introduction to the subject, cautions teachers regarding its many inaccuracies. Additionally, they question where the empathy lies as many young readers will focus on the fact that Bruno died rather than the millions of Jews.

Professor Gerd Bayer from the University of Erlangen has stated that Boyne's reader should not rely on "the actual truth-value of his text".

Following on from their research in 2016, that suggested that pupils reach mistaken and/or misleading conclusions about the Holocaust from the book, the UCL Centre for Holocaust Education's 2020 research found that 35% of teachers in England conducting lessons on the Holocaust use it, or the film.

In response to Noah Max's operatic adaptation of the book, Professor Nathan Abrams wrote that "it is a very tricky task to translate the magnitude of the Holocaust to a younger audience. Any device, however flawed, should be applauded for attempting to do so even if it does not fully succeed. It is the task of the reader to go and learn more to put the novel in context."

== Reception ==
In both 2007 and 2008, it was the best-selling book of the year in Spain, and it reached number one on The New York Times Best Seller list.

Kathryn Hughes, writing in The Guardian, calls the novel "a small wonder of a book." She takes issue with the laxness of Auschwitz and describes the novel as "something that borders on fable," arguing that "Bruno's innocence comes to stand for the willful refusal of all adult Germans to see what was going on under their noses."

Nicholas Tucker, writing in The Independent, calls the novel "a fine addition to a once taboo area of history, at least where children's literature is concerned." He asserts that it is a good depiction of a tragic event that strays away from graphic details, with the exception of the "killer punch" at the end of the novel.

Ed Wright, writing in The Age of Melbourne, calls the novel "a touching tale of an odd friendship between two boys in horrendous circumstances and a reminder of man's capacity for inhumanity." He felt that the depiction of Bruno and Shmuel's friendship was a classic childhood friendship with a naïvety of their surroundings. He concludes by observing that "The Boy in the Striped Pyjamas is subtitled A Fable", and sets out to create a moral story of human nature in a fable format.

A. O. Scott, writing in The New York Times, questioned the author and publisher's choice to intentionally keep the Holocaust setting of the book vague in both the dust jacket summary and the early portion of the novel. Scott described how the experiences of the characters were supposed to be represented as separate from the setting of the Holocaust, and this creates a lack of the informative nature seen in other novels of Holocaust literature such as Night by Elie Wiesel. Scott claims that "there is something awkward about the way Boyne manages to disguise, and then to disclose, the historical context." Scott concludes that "to mold the Holocaust into an allegory, as Boyne does here with perfectly benign intent, is to step away from its reality."

Rabbi Benjamin Blech offered a historical criticism, contending that the premise of the book and subsequent film – that there could be a child of Shmuel's age in Auschwitz – was impossible, writing of the book: "Note to the reader: there were no 9-year-old Jewish boys in Auschwitz – the Nazis immediately gassed those not old enough to work." Rabbi Blech affirmed the opinion of a Holocaust survivor friend that the book is "not just a lie and not just a fairytale, but a profanation." Students who read it, he warns, may believe the camps "weren't that bad" if a boy could conduct a clandestine friendship with a Jewish captive of the same age, unaware of "the constant presence of death."

Holocaust scholar Henry Gonshak rebuts Blech's historical contention in his book, Hollywood and the Holocaust. He writes that "the rabbi found implausible Shmuel's very existence in the camp," but states that "Blech is factually incorrect." While there were no female children, records have shown that in 1944 "there were 619 male children at the camp, ranging in age from one month to fourteen years old."

Gonshak acknowledges that this presence of children does not take away from the thousands who were murdered in the gas chambers.

The novel has been unfavourably contrasted with nonfiction accounts of the Holocaust such as Maus, with author Gwen C. Katz coining the term "pajamafication" to describe the practice of teaching history through sanitized, "kid-friendly" fictional works. She criticizes the book for basing it on a German boy rather than the Jewish victims, portraying him as innocently ignorant of the Holocaust, and using the story to trivialize the Holocaust.

== In other media ==
In 2008, two years after being published, the novel was made into a movie The Boy in the Striped Pyjamas, directed by Mark Herman.

In 2017, the novel was adapted into a ballet by the Northern Ballet. The score is produced by Gary Yershon. Reviews of the ballet are generally negative with Zo and Euml Anderson of The Independent stating the casting of children's parts as adults works against "the naivety of a child's viewpoint," which the novel captures. The Yorkshire Post's review described the score as "a relentless assault on the ears," but apart from the music, it stated that it has redeemable quality in the cast, despite being depressing.

In 2023 the novel was adapted into an opera entitled A Child In Striped Pyjamas by Noah Max. He says of Boyne's book: "It's very hard to convince children to read a book about something as dark and serious as the Holocaust and what I find amazing is that while not all adults get the profound symbolism of the story, kids get it. They pick up on the fact that the children have the same birthday and are the same child." On the appropriateness of depicting the Holocaust through opera, Max says: "the only way to convey its magnitude – and in such a way that people understood it was symbolic and not real – was through opera." The piece was positively received by critics. Barry Millington gave A Child In Striped Pyjamas four stars in the Evening Standard, describing the work as "intense, harrowing drama... [which] invites universal grief". In The Daily Telegraph, Nicholas Kenyon wrote that the piece was "emotionally ambitious... vocally eloquent... there can be no doubt of the integrity with which the tight-knit company deliver it."

== Sequel ==
A sequel, All the Broken Places, was published in 2022, focusing on the post-war life of Gretel, the now 91-year-old older sister of Bruno.
