= All the Broken Places =

2022 novel by John Boyne

- Author: John Boyne
- Language: English
- Series: The Boy in the Striped Pyjamas
- Genre: Historical fiction
- Published: 2022 (Doubleday)
- Publication date: 15 September 2022
- Publication place: United Kingdom
- Pages: 366
- ISBN: 9780857528858
- Preceded by: The Boy in the Striped Pyjamas

All the Broken Places is a historical fiction novel by John Boyne. It was published on 15 September 2022 by Doubleday. A sequel to The Boy in the Striped Pajamas (2006), the book follows Gretel, a now-elderly woman living in London, who is forced to face her past in Nazi Germany after a new family moves in downstairs. The story is split into three parts, each taking place in two time periods and locations each.

== Background ==
All the Broken Places is a sequel to Boyne's 2006 book The Boy in the Striped Pyjamas and follows Gretel, the now 91-year-old older sister of Bruno from that book. Gretel has lived in London for decades, never speaking of her childhood in Nazi Germany as the daughter of a concentration camp commandant. Gretel's life is upended when a new family moves in downstairs whose circumstances force her to confront her own past. Gretel serves as the narrator of the novel, which is broken into sections labelled as three parts, two interludes, and an epilogue. Each section is also labelled with the time period and location of the action of that section; parts one, two, and three each include two time periods and locations.

== Plot ==
Following the events of the previous novel, Gretel's father, Ralf, is executed shortly after World War II ends. In 1946, 15-year-old Gretel and her mother, Elsa, immigrate to Paris, using false identities to claim French nationality. They clash over the Holocaust: Gretel believes that they share responsibility while Elsa disagrees. Seeking security, Elsa courts Rémy Toussaint, a wealthy man and former resistance member in the hope that their eventual marriage will guarantee their future. However, Gretel becomes infatuated with Emile, an assistant in his father's haberdashery shop, whose older brother was a resistance fighter executed by the Germans. Gretel senses something peculiar in Emile and Rémy’s behavior.

On a night out with their lovers, Gretel and Elsa face furious neighbors who have lost loved ones in the war. During the altercation, their heads are forcibly shaved. They soon flee to Rouen, where Gretel becomes a seamstress. Elsa's bitterness about the attack eventually drives her towards pro-Nazism sentiments. In 1952, Elsa dies from grief and alcoholism. Gretel moves to Australia, befriending Kate Softly, a lesbian Irishwoman who was physically abused by her father for falling pregnant; the beatings then resulted in her suffering a miscarriage. They rent a place together in Sydney, with Gretel working at a dressmaker's shop and Kate as a barmaid. Gretel learns about Kate’s relationships and her own past.

At the pub where Kate works, Gretel spots Lieutenant Kurt Kotler, a former German soldier who served under her father. She starts observing Kurt, discovering his new life as a banker in Australia. One day, Gretel kidnaps his son, Hugo, planning a murder-suicide but eventually agreeing to meet Kurt. They discuss her anger and his support for the Nazi regime, with Kurt pointing out that Gretel is angry with him as a means of escaping from her own guilt.

Following the kidnapping, Gretel relocates to London, where she finds work at Harrods. Gretel falls for a co-worker, David, initially unaware he is Jewish until his friend Edgar tells her so. Nevertheless, she begins a romantic relationship with him. However, after attending a showing of a film about the Holocaust and seeing footage of her family in the film, Gretel runs out of the theatre and attempts suicide by jumping in front of a bus. In the hospital, Edgar informs her about David’s past; how he was born in Prague and escaped with his grandparents after the occupation, and that parents and sister were delayed and disappeared, ultimately being murdered in Treblinka extermination camp. Gretel also learns in the hospital that she is pregnant with David's child. After being discharged, she comes clean and tells David the story of her life. He is disgusted and abandons her, not knowing that Gretel is carrying his child. Eventually, Gretel marries Edgar and gives up her and David's daughter (whom she names Heidi) for adoption.

In 1961, Gretel and Edgar have a son named Caden. Struggling with motherhood, Gretel distances herself and largely leaves the responsibility of bringing up her son to Edgar. One day, when he is nine years old, Caden briefly disappears after crawling through a hole in the fence behind their home. The parallelism of this experience with that of her late younger brother Bruno causes Gretel to suffer a breakdown. She spends a year in the hospital, reliving her childhood and fantasizing that she is a child again. Gretel's doctor, who was evacuated as a child in World War II, reflects on their shared trauma, which frustrates Gretel as she feels like she has suffered much more than the doctor.

In 2008, Gretel's husband, Edgar, who had become a respected historian specializing in World War II, dies. Gretel expresses regret that she never told him why it was so important to her that they move into Winterville Court, a block of flats in Mayfair, after he received an inheritance early in their marriage. Gretel lives next to her abandoned daughter Heidi, who is prone to confusion and memory loss. Meanwhile, Caden is getting married for the fourth time and his construction business is faltering, leading Caden to pressure Gretel to move into a retirement village. Despite her refusal, Gretel agrees to help him financially. She also meets and admires Caden’s fiancée Eleanor, a heart surgeon, to whom she confides some details of her past. Eleanor becomes a friend and ally.

However, the arrival of film producer Alex Darcy-Witt's family in a flat downstairs disrupts their lives. Alex is abusive and very controlling of his wife Madelyn and his nine-year-old son Henry, seeing them as his property. This behavior proves to be too much for Gretel, who eventually calls the police on Alex in an attempt to safeguard his wife and son, but nothing comes of their investigation. In retaliation, Alex tells Gretel that he knows her true identity and threatens to reveal it if Gretel draws attention to him again. This leads Gretel to take drastic action; by inviting Alex into her flat, slitting his throat, and handing herself over to the police following Caden's wedding. The novel ends with Gretel imprisoned in a comfortable, low security facility, knowing that her secret will die with her and Gretel's expected grandchild will grow up unaware of its ancestry.

== Reception ==
The novel was reviewed in The Guardian and the Star Tribune, with the former discussing Gretel's characterization and the latter describing the story as "an essential one" and "darkly compelling". Booklist's Margaret Quamme discussed Boyne's engagement with the novel's main themes of guilt and complicity with violence but said that the plot for contains too many coincidences and chance encounters. Martina Devlin, writing in the Irish Independent, said that the historical material of the novel was handled well and that the novel remained fast-paced throughout.

Other reviewers of All the Broken Places discussed its handling of the Holocaust and many of its characters' complicity in the events. The Sunday Times discussed the novel's structure and described the plot as not being believable. The Daily Telegraph's Tanya Gold said that the novel could only be described as skillful if "you know nothing about the Holocaust, and if you wish to know nothing." She writes that the storyline about Gretel's life in the 1940s and '50s was the "valuable part of novel" but that other parts of the story become "a thriller". Gold also says that "parallel narratives – one promising, one insulting – combine into a pulpy denouement that shames the author and the reader both." The New Statesman's Ann Manov said the novel was "childish drivel" and as having "utterly fail[ed] in its stated purpose" of furthering genocide education. Manov also wrote that the novel is "so self-indulgent, so grossly stereotyped, so shameless and insipid that one is almost astonished that [Boyne] has dared."

Publishers Weekly wrote that the novel served as an acceptable sequel to The Boy in the Striped Pajamas but that it was not capable of fully standing on its own. Kirkus Reviews discussed Boyne's character work throughout the book.
