= Jackson Irvine =

Australian soccer player (born 1993)

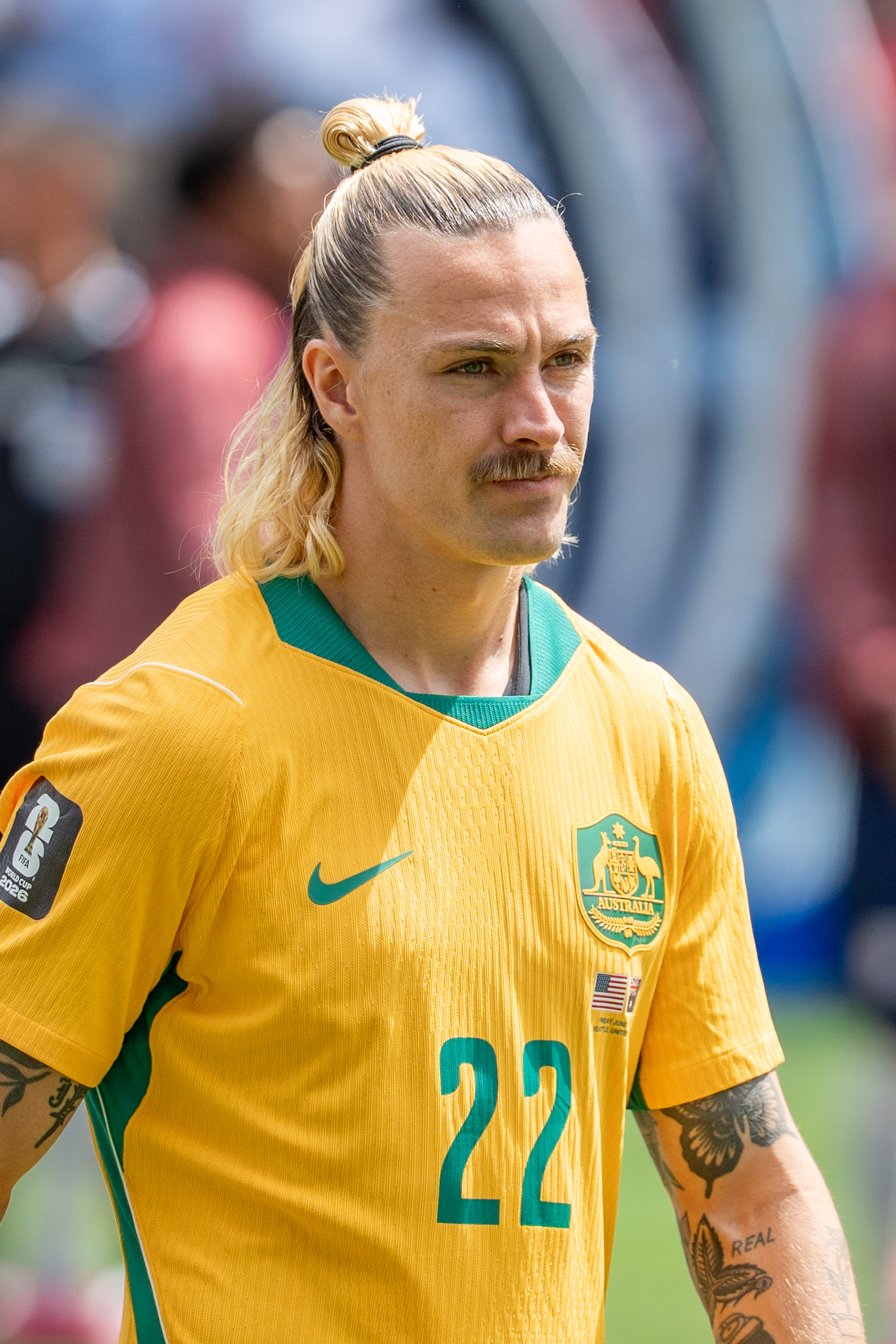
- Irvine with Australia in 2026

Personal information
- Full name: Jackson Alexander Irvine
- Date of birth: 7 March 1993 (age 33)
- Place of birth: Melbourne, Australia
- Height: 1.89 m (6 ft 2 in)
- Position: Central midfielder

Team information
- Current team: Cerezo Osaka
- Number: 36

Youth career
- 1999–2002: Ringwood City JSC
- 2003–2006: Knox City
- 2007–2008: Endeavour United
- 2008: Richmond SC
- 2009–2010: Melbourne Victory
- 2010–2012: Celtic

Senior career*
Years	Team	Apps	(Gls)
2009	Frankston Pines	19	(1)
2012–2015	Celtic	1	(0)
2013–2014	→ Kilmarnock (loan)	27	(1)
2014–2015	→ Ross County (loan)	28	(2)
2015–2016	Ross County	36	(2)
2016–2017	Burton Albion	44	(11)
2017–2020	Hull City	107	(10)
2021	Hibernian	15	(0)
2021–2026	FC St. Pauli	141	(15)
2026–	Cerezo Osaka	1	(0)

International career^{‡}
2011–2012	Scotland U19	3	(1)
2012–2013	Australia U20	12	(0)
2014–2015	Australia U23	8	(0)
2013–	Australia	88	(14)
- * Club domestic league appearances and goals as of 15 August 2026 (UTC) ‡ National team caps and goals as of 29 September 2026

Jackson Alexander Irvine (born 7 March 1993) is an Australian professional soccer player who plays as a central midfielder for J1 League club Cerezo Osaka and the Australia national team.

Irvine previously played for Celtic, Kilmarnock, Ross County, Burton Albion, Hull City, Hibernian and FC St. Pauli.

Irvine played for Scotland at under-19 level, but subsequently chose to represent the Australia national team at senior level, and was selected in their 2018, 2022 and 2026 FIFA World Cup squads. Irvine is the 63rd captain of Australia.

== Club career ==
=== Celtic ===
Irvine was born and raised in Melbourne, Australia, where he attended The Knox School. and where he played for clubs in the Victorian League structure. While growing up, Irvine met Curtis Good when "they were both ten and lived two minutes from each other and grew up together". They also "ran cross countries together, played for Knox City (in Melbourne) as juniors". He won the Frankston Pines player of the year award in 2009, his first season of senior football.

He signed with Celtic in December 2010 after a successful trial period. During the 2011–12 season, Irvine played for Celtic in the NextGen Series, a pan-European competition for youth teams, he also captained the under 19-side that won the Scottish Youth Cup and Under-19 League that season. Irvine also won the Youth Cup in 2010–11 and 2012–13. He made his Scottish Premier League debut on 1 September 2012, when he came on as a half-time substitute in a 2–2 draw against Hibernian. Having made his first team debut he also captained the club's new under-20 side.

=== Kilmarnock (loan) ===
At the start of the 2013–14 season, Irvine joined Scottish Premiership side Kilmarnock on a six-month loan following interest from manager Allan Johnston.

Two days after signing for the club, Irvine made his debut, in a 1–1 draw against St Mirren. Irvine then went on to earn regular playing time in the starting eleven. After making six appearances at the club, Irvine scored a "stunning strike from a short Barry Nicholson free-kick" in a 2–0 victory over Ross County on 19 October 2013, giving Johnston his first win for Kilmarnock since arriving at the club as manager. Several weeks later, on 9 November 2013, Irvine was sent-off for receiving a second bookable offence, in a 3–1 loss against St Johnstone. In January 2014, Irvine's loan spell with Kilmarnock was extended until the end of the season.

=== Ross County ===
On 1 September 2014, Irvine was sent out on loan again, this time to Ross County. He made his debut on 13 September 2014, in a 2–1 home defeat against Motherwell. On 28 July 2015, Ross County signed Irvine on a two-year permanent deal from Celtic for a development fee.

=== Burton Albion ===
On 15 July 2016, Irvine signed for English Championship club Burton Albion for a reported fee of £330,000, with the club saying they had broken their transfer record to sign him. He made his debut for the club on 13 August against Bristol City. Three days later he scored his first goal, helping Burton Albion beat Sheffield Wednesday 3–1. This marked the start of a run of four goals in his first six league games for the club. Irvine was named Burton's Player of the Year for 2016–17 after scoring 10 goals in 43 games and helping the club to avoid relegation.

=== Hull City ===
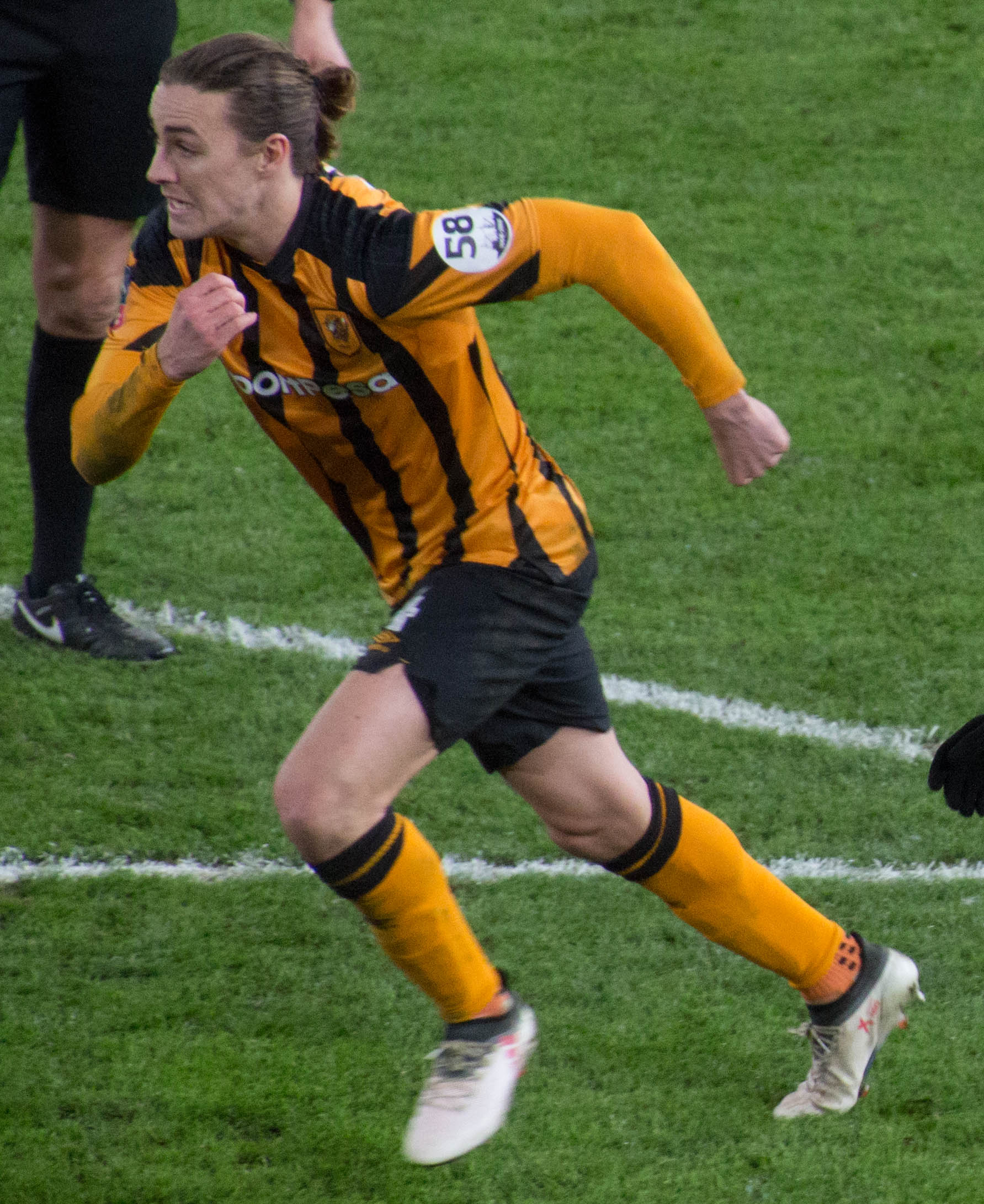
Irvine playing for Hull City in 2018

On 30 August 2017, Irvine signed a three-year deal with Hull City. On 8 September 2017, he made his debut for the club when he came off the bench after 70-minutes to replace Jon Toral in a 5–0 away loss to Derby County. On 9 December 2017, Irvine scored his first goal for the club when he netted Hull's final goal in a 3–2 home win against Brentford.

Irvine was released by Hull City in June 2020.

=== Hibernian ===
On 12 January 2021, Irvine joined Scottish side Hibernian until the end of the 2020–21 season.

=== FC St. Pauli ===
On 5 July 2021, Irvine signed for German club FC St. Pauli, playing in the 2. Bundesliga. For the 2022–23 season, he became team co-captain, sharing the captaincy with Leart Paqarada. After Paqarada left the club in July 2023 Irvine became the sole captain for the 2023–24 season.

In August 2024, a day before FC St. Pauli's first match in the Bundesliga after promotion, Irvine agreed a contract extension with the club.

Irvine captained FC St. Pauli to the 2023–24 2. Bundesliga title and promotion to the Bundesliga, ending the club's 13-year absence from the German top flight. He played a key role throughout the campaign and established himself as one of the team's leaders both on and off the pitch. During his time at St. Pauli, Irvine made 153 appearances in all competitions, scoring 15 goals and providing 21 assists.

=== Cerezo Osaka ===
On 5 August 2026, Irvine joined J1 League club Cerezo Osaka. He made his debut for the club in a 3-0 loss to Avispa Fukuoka, where he came on as a substitute in the 46th minute. On 22nd August 2026, He made his first start and assist in a 1-0 win against Shimizu S-Pulse.

== International career ==
Irvine represented Scotland at the under-19 international level, although he said in October 2011 that he was still interested in playing for Australia. Irvine was eligible to play for Scotland because his father was born in Aberdeen, although he reiterated his desire to play for his native Australia in September 2012. On 11 October 2012, he made his debut for the Australia under-20 team in a friendly match against Portugal. He represented Australia at the 2012 AFC U-19 Championship in United Arab Emirates and at the 2013 FIFA U-20 World Cup in Turkey.

In September 2013, Irvine received his first Australia senior national team call-up and was selected for two matches. After being on the bench for one game, Irvine made his debut coming on as a substitute for Mile Jedinak in the 83rd minute, in a 3–0 win over Canada on 15 October 2013.

In May 2018, Irvine was named in Australia's 23-man squad for the 2018 World Cup in Russia.

In November 2022, he was named in his second World Cup squad, and was named in the starting team of the opening match against France as a right midfielder.

On 28 March 2023, Irvine became the 63rd captain of Australia in a friendly against Ecuador at Docklands Stadium. In December 2023, he was called up for the Asian Cup in Qatar. On 18 January 2024, he scored the only goal in a 1–0 victory over Syria, which qualified his country to the knockout phase.

On 31 May 2026, Irvine was selected in the 26-man squad for the 2026 FIFA World Cup.

== Personal life ==
Irvine is noted for his support for social justice causes, especially LGBTQ inclusion in football.

In 2026, he criticised FIFA, saying football's credibility as a force for good has been undermined by its creation of a "FIFA Peace Prize" to award to Donald Trump, claiming it made a mockery of human rights.

Irvine hosted his own radio show, Heimspiel, every four weeks on the Hamburg-based music station ByteFM from 2024 to 2026.

In November 2026, Irvine announced the birth of his first child, a boy.

== Career statistics ==
=== Club ===
As of match played 7 August 2026

Appearances and goals by club, season and competition
Club	Season	League			National cup (Note: Includes Scottish Cup, FA Cup, DFB-Pokal)		League cup (Note: Includes Scottish League Cup, EFL Cup)		Continental		Total	
Club	Season	Division	Apps	Goals	Apps	Goals	Apps	Goals	Apps	Goals	Apps	Goals
Frankston Pines	2009	Victorian State League Division 1	19	1	—		—		—		19	1
Celtic	2012–13	Scottish Premier League	1	0	0	0	0	0	0	0	1	0
Celtic	2013–14	Scottish Premiership	0	0	0	0	0	0	0	0	0	0
Celtic	2014–15	Scottish Premiership	0	0	0	0	0	0	0	0	0	0
Celtic	Total		1	0	0	0	0	0	0	0	1	0
Kilmarnock (loan)	2013–14	Scottish Premiership	27	1	1	0	1	0	—		29	1
Ross County (loan)	2014–15	Scottish Premiership	28	2	1	0	1	0	—		30	2
Ross County	2015–16	Scottish Premiership	36	2	4	0	5	1	—		45	3
Burton Albion	2016–17	Championship	42	10	0	0	2	0	—		44	10
Burton Albion	2017–18	Championship	3	1	0	0	2	0	—		5	1
Burton Albion	Total		45	11	0	0	4	0	—		49	11
Hull City	2017–18	Championship	34	2	3	0	0	0	—		37	2
Hull City	2018–19	Championship	38	6	0	0	1	0	—		39	6
Hull City	2019–20	Championship	35	2	1	0	0	0	—		36	2
Hull City	Total		107	10	4	0	1	0	—		112	10
Hibernian	2020–21	Scottish Premiership	15	0	5	1	1	0	—		21	1
FC St. Pauli	2021–22	2. Bundesliga	28	1	3	0	—		—		31	1
FC St. Pauli	2022–23	2. Bundesliga	33	8	2	0	—		—		35	8
FC St. Pauli	2023–24	2. Bundesliga	27	6	3	0	—		—		30	6
FC St. Pauli	2024–25	Bundesliga	29	0	2	0	—		—		31	0
FC St. Pauli	2025–26	Bundesliga	24	0	2	0	—		—		26	0
FC St. Pauli	Total		141	15	12	0	—		—		153	15
Cerezo Osaka	2026-27	J1 League	0	0	—		—		—		0	0
Cerezo Osaka	Total		0	0	0	0	0	0	0	0	0	0
Career total			419	42	27	1	13	1	0	0	459	44

=== International ===
As of match played 3 July 2026

Appearances and goals by national team and year
National team	Year	Apps	Goals
Australia	2013	1	0
Australia	2014	0	0
Australia	2015	1	0
Australia	2016	5	0
Australia	2017	8	1
Australia	2018	10	2
Australia	2019	9	2
Australia	2020	0	0
Australia	2021	9	1
Australia	2022	10	1
Australia	2023	7	2
Australia	2024	16	2
Australia	2025	4	3
Australia	2026	6	0
Total		86	14

Scores and results list Australia's goal tally first, score column indicates score after each Irvine goal.

List of international goals scored by Jackson Irvine
No.	Date	Venue	Opponent	Score	Result	Competition
1	28 March 2017	Sydney Football Stadium, Sydney, Australia	United Arab Emirates	1–0	2–0	2018 FIFA World Cup qualification
2	23 March 2018	Ullevaal Stadion, Oslo, Norway	Norway	1–0	1–4	Friendly
3	30 December 2018	Al-Maktoum Stadium, Dubai, United Arab Emirates	Oman	5–0	5–0	Friendly
4	15 October 2019	National Stadium, Kaohsiung, Taiwan	Chinese Taipei	3–1	7–1	2022 FIFA World Cup qualification
5	15 October 2019	National Stadium, Kaohsiung, Taiwan	Chinese Taipei	4–1	7–1	2022 FIFA World Cup qualification
6	3 June 2021	Jaber Al-Ahmad International Stadium, Kuwait City, Kuwait	Kuwait	2–0	3–0	2022 FIFA World Cup qualification
7	7 June 2022	Ahmad bin Ali Stadium, Al-Rayyan, Qatar	United Arab Emirates	1–0	2–1	2022 FIFA World Cup qualification
8	24 March 2023	Western Sydney Stadium, Sydney, Australia	Ecuador	1–0	3–1	Friendly
9	18 October 2023	Gtech Community Stadium, London, United Kingdom	New Zealand	2–0	2–0	Soccer Ashes
10	13 January 2024	Ahmad bin Ali Stadium, Al-Rayyan, Qatar	India	1–0	2–0	2023 AFC Asian Cup
11	18 January 2024	Jassim bin Hamad Stadium, Al-Rayyan, Qatar	Syria	1–0	1–0	2023 AFC Asian Cup
12	20 March 2025	Sydney Football Stadium, Sydney, Australia	Indonesia	3–0	5–1	2026 FIFA World Cup qualification
13	20 March 2025	Sydney Football Stadium, Sydney, Australia	Indonesia	5–1	5–1	2026 FIFA World Cup qualification
14	25 March 2025	Hangzhou Sports Park Stadium, Hangzhou, China	China	1–0	2–0	2026 FIFA World Cup qualification

== Honours ==
Ross County

- Scottish League Cup: 2015–16

FC St. Pauli

- 2. Bundesliga: 2023–24

Australia

- Soccer Ashes: 2023

Individual

- Scottish Premiership Player of the Month: March 2016
- Burton Albion Player of the Year: 2016–17
- AFC Asian Cup Team of the Tournament: 2023
- PFA Men's Footballer of the Year: 2024
