= This House Is Haunted =

2013 novel by John Boyne

- First edition
- Author: John Boyne
- Language: English
- Publication date: 2013

This House Is Haunted is a novel written by Irish novelist John Boyne. It was first published in 2013 by Doubleday.
