= A History of Loneliness =

2014 novel by John Boyne

- First edition
- Author: John Boyne
- Language: English
- Publisher: Doubleday
- Publication date: 2014

A History of Loneliness is a novel written by Irish novelist John Boyne. It was first published in 2014 by Doubleday.
