= List of Australia men's national soccer team captains =

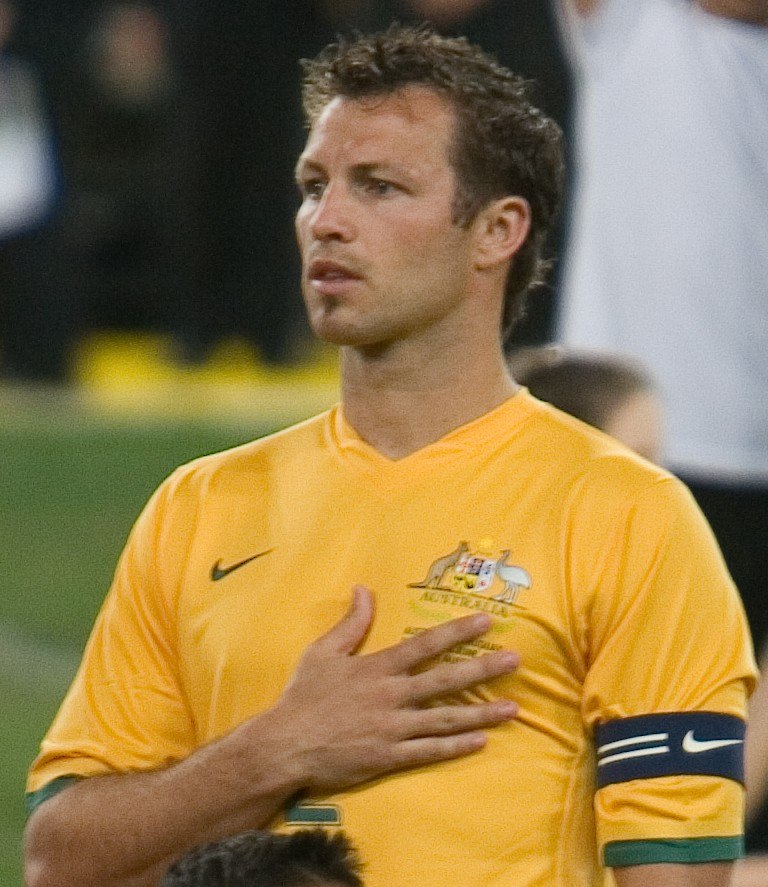
Lucas Neill has the most captaincies of Australia, with 61

This article lists all the captains of the Australia national men's soccer team.

The first Australia captain was Alex Gibb; he captained Australia in their first international match, against New Zealand on 17 June 1922. He went on to captain Australia on five further occasions, captained Australia in their first international on home soil, 9 June 1923 vs. New Zealand, and was the first international captain to win a match.

Since then, Lucas Neill went on to set the record for most captaincies of his country, with 61.

== List of captains ==
=== Captains by tournament ===
- **Bold** indicates tournament winners
- Italics indicates tournament hosts

Player	Tournament(s)
Peter Wilson	1974 FIFA World Cup
Eddie Krncevic	**1980 Oceania Cup**
Paul Wade	**1996 OFC Nations Cup**
Alex Tobin	1997 FIFA Confederations Cup; 1998 OFC Nations Cup
Paul Okon	2000 OFC Nations Cup; 2001 FIFA Confederations Cup
Damian Mori	**2002 OFC Nations Cup**
Tony Vidmar	**2004 OFC Nations Cup**
Craig Moore	2005 FIFA Confederations Cup
Mark Viduka	2006 FIFA World Cup; 2007 AFC Asian Cup
Lucas Neill	2010 FIFA World Cup; 2011 AFC Asian Cup
Mile Jedinak	2014 FIFA World Cup; **2015 AFC Asian Cup**; 2018 FIFA World Cup
Mark Milligan	2017 FIFA Confederations Cup; 2019 AFC Asian Cup
Mathew Ryan	2022 FIFA World Cup; 2023 AFC Asian Cup
Harry Souttar	2026 FIFA World Cup

=== Captains by appearances as captain ===
Figures include all recognised matches up to 25 September 2026. The default order for this list is by most appearances as captain, then chronological order of first captaincy. Only confirmed captaincies are counted.

- **Bold** indicates active players

#	Player	Australia career	Caps as captain	Total caps	First captaincy	Last captaincy
1	Lucas Neill	1996–2013	61	96	7 October 2006	19 November 2013
2	Peter Wilson	1970–1979	61	65	11 November 1971	13 June 1979
3	Paul Wade	1990–1996	46	84	25 August 1990	1 November 1996
4	**Mathew Ryan**	2012—present	46	105	15 October 2019	31 May 2026
5	Mile Jedinak	2008–2018	35	79	5 March 2014	26 June 2018
6	Charlie Yankos	1983–1989	30	49	25 August 1986	16 April 1989
6	Alex Tobin	1988–1988	30	87	11 February 1995	6 November 1998
8	John Kosmina	1976–1988	25	60	6 October 1982	9 March 1988
9	Johnny Warren	1965–1974	24	42	5 November 1967	1 December 1970
9	Paul Okon	1991–2003	24	28	9 October 1996	7 September 2003
11	Mark Milligan	2006–2019	18	80	20 July 2013	10 October 2019
12	Mark Viduka	1994–2007	17	43	3 August 2005	21 July 2007
13	Craig Moore	1995–2010	13	52	18 February 2004	
14	Mark Schwarzer	1993–2013	10	109	21 May 2004	
15	Jimmy Rooney	1970–1980	9	57	24 October 1976	31 May 1980
15	Murray Barnes	1975–1981	9	32	18 June 1978	14 August 1981
15	Tim Cahill	2004–2018	9	108	26 May 2014	10 October 2017
18	Pat Hughes	1965–1967	7	13	26 November 1965	4 June 1967
18	Aurelio Vidmar	1991–2001	7	44	21 June 1995	28 February 2001
18	**Jackson Irvine**	2013–present	7	88	28 March 2023	14 November 2024
18	**Harry Souttar**	2019–present	7	44	7 June 2026	29 September 2026
22	Alex Gibb	1922–1923	6	6	17 June 1922	30 June 1922
22	Bob Lawrie	1939–1953	6	10	14 June 1950	23 July 1950
22	Tony Vidmar	1991–2006	6	76	9 June 2001	4 June 2004
22	Harry Kewell	1996–2012	6	58	22 March 2008	26 July 2014
26	Judy Masters	1923–1924	5	6	7 June 1924	
26	Tony Henderson	1979–1983	5	27	11 June 1980	2 December 1980
26	Graham Arnold	1985–1997	5	54	6 June 1993	23 March 1996
26	Kevin Muscat	1994–2006	5	46	9 April 2001	16 August 2006
26	Steve Horvat	1994–2002	5	32	15 August 2001	14 July 2002
26	Brett Emerton	1998–2012	5	95	6 February 2007	9 December 2012
32	Cec Drummond	1947–1951	4	?	14 August 1948	11 September 1948
32	Joe Marston	1949–1959	4	?	3 September 1955	23 August 1958
32	Bob Bignall	1949–1959	4	8	24 September 1955	12 December 1956
32	Trent Sainsbury	2014-2022	4	61	1 June 2018	7 June 2021
32	**Mathew Leckie**	2012–present	4	82	11 September 2019	25 September 2022
37	George Smith	1933–1936	3	6	5 June 1933	24 July 1933
37	Alec Cameron	1933–1936	3	6	4 July 1936	18 July 1936
37	Bill Coolahan	1938	3	3	3 September 1938	1 October 1938
37	Reg Date	1947–1950	3	5	24 May 1947	14 June 1947
37	Kevin O'Neill	1950–1958	3	12	28 August 1954	1 October 1955
37	Les Scheinflug	1965–1968	3	6	21 November 1965	8 December 1965
37	Stan Ackerley	1965–1969	3	27	31 March 1968	23 November 1969
37	Josip Skoko	1997–2007	3	51	6 June 2004	6 September 2006
45	Alec Heaney	1947–1950	2	4	10 May 1947	7 June 1947
45	Tom Jack	1950–1955	2	11	14 August 1954	10 September 1955
45	Gary Marocchi	1975–1978	2	13	11 June 1978	14 June 1978
45	Peter Raskopoulos	1980–1987	2	15	30 August 1981	6 September 1981
45	Zeljko Kalac	1992–2006	2	54	4 October 2000	7 October 2000
45	Matt McKay	2006–2016	2	59	7 December 2012	28 July 2013
45	**Alessandro Circati**	2023–present	2	19	9 September 2025	11 October 2025
52	Jack Evans	1933–1941	1	12	10 September 1938	
52	Jimmy Osborne	1933–1941	1	7	24 September 1938	
52	Eddie Krncevic	1979–1989	1	35	26 February 1980	
52	David Ratcliffe	1982–1986	1	21	23 October 1985	
52	Joe Watson	1979–1986	1	17	10 August 1986	
52	Alan Davidson	1980–1991	1	51	12 October 1988	
52	Frank Farina	1984–1995	1	37	18 June 1995	
52	Milan Ivanović	1991–1998	1	59	15 February 1998	
52	Craig Foster	1996–2000	1	29	15 February 2000	
52	Mehmet Durakovic	1990–2002	1	64	12 July 2002	
52	Vince Grella	2003–2010	1	46	12 July 2002	
52	Jason Culina	2005–2011	1	58	3 March 2010	
52	**Aziz Behich**	2012–present	1	89	7 June 2019	
52	**Miloš Degenek**	2016–present	1	57	5 September 2025	
