= The Absolutist =

2011 novel by John Boyne

- First edition
- Author: John Boyne
- Language: English
- Publication date: 2011

The Absolutist is a novel by John Boyne. It was first published in 2011 by Doubleday.
