= A Ladder to the Sky =

2018 Irish novel

A Ladder to the Sky is a 2018 novel by Irish novelist John Boyne, and his eleventh novel for adults. The plot concerns Maurice Swift, a handsome young writer who schemes, seduces, and plagiarizes his way to literary stardom. The novel received positive reviews from critics, and was shortlisted for Novel of the Year at the 2018 Irish Book Awards.

== Plot ==
The novel is divided into five sections, spanning from 1988 to the present.

In 1988, German novelist Erich Ackermann has just received "The Prize" for his novel Dread. At a hotel in West Berlin, he meets a charming young waiter named Maurice Swift. Starved for romance, Erich arranges a meeting with Maurice, who is originally from Yorkshire and wants to be a world-renowned novelist; to that end, he gives Erich one of his stories to read and asks for feedback. The story is well-written but its plot is clichéd; nonetheless Erich, still smitten, offers to hire Swift as an assistant as he travels across Europe. Maurice seduces Erich with the twin aims of networking with Erich's publishing contacts, and drawing out a story about his teenage romance with a young artist named Oskar Gött. Erich eventually confesses that, when Oskar announced his plans to flee Germany with a Jewish girl, he reported her to the SS, sending her family to a concentration camp; Oskar attempted to rescue her and was promptly shot and killed by a Nazi soldier. Disgusted, Maurice breaks off contact with Erich, and turns his life story into a roman à clef titled Two Germans. Two Germans is a critical success, and launches Swift's literary career; Ackermann's career is destroyed, and he is disgraced as a Nazi collaborator.

A few years later, Swift strikes up a largely transactional relationship with an older gay novelist named Dash Hardy. Swift and Hardy visit the Amalfi Coast, where they've been invited to stay at Gore Vidal's villa. Swift and Vidal trade barbs, and debate whether they'll be remembered after their deaths. Later that night, Swift sneaks into Vidal's bedroom, where his sexual advances are rejected.

The novel's third section, set in the late '90s, is written in the second-person by Edith Camberley, a Black British writer whom Swift has married. Swift's career has stalled after his second novel, The Treehouse, flops; meanwhile, Camberley's debut novel Fear has become a critical and commercial success, and she takes a lecturer position at the University of East Anglia. Edith notes her husband's increasingly strange behavior, and assumes he's having an affair. She later realizes that he has passed off her work-in-progress second novel, The Tribesman, as his own work and submitted it to a publisher. A pregnant Edith confronts him and demands a divorce; Swift pushes her down the stairs of their flat. It becomes clear that this section of the novel has been told by Edith while comatose; the section ends with her watching as Maurice has her taken off life support.

A decade later, Swift has moved to New York, where he is raising a son named Daniel (conceived by an Italian surrogate) as a single father. Swift has used the critical and commercial success of The Tribesman to launch a literary magazine named Storī, and has published two successful novels with premises stolen from Storī's slush pile. Daniel gets into a fight with a girl from his private school, and Maurice reminisces on the one genuine romantic relationship of his life: a clandestine romance with another schoolboy during his teen years, which ended when he was caught by his headmaster and then sexually abused.

In the book's final section, Maurice has moved back to London; his son died as a teenager, and he has become a barely-functional alcoholic. He receives a letter from a student named Theo Field, who wants to interview Maurice for a biography he's writing, and whose father works at a publishing house; Maurice accepts the offer, hoping to revive his literary career. During their first meeting, Maurice is upset to discover that Theo, in both appearance and mannerisms, greatly resembles his late son. Drunk and lonely, Maurice admits first to seducing Erich and Dash, then to stealing Edith's manuscript, and then finally confesses his greatest shame: back in New York he had written an autofictional version of his life story, which Daniel read; desperate, Maurice seized his inhaler, and watched his distraught son die of an asthma attack. Theo reveals he has recorded Maurice's confession. Moreover, he reveals that he had deliberately altered his appearance to resemble the late Daniel, to establish rapport with Maurice, and that the biography he's writing is actually about his great-uncle, Erich Ackermann.

In a postscript, Maurice recounts from jail that Ackermann's legacy has been rehabilitated, and that The Tribesman has been republished under Edith's name. He participates in a creative writing program at his prison; when his cellmate dies, Maurice reads his story, notes that it's quite good, and decides to send it to a publisher.

== Reception ==
A Ladder to the Sky received positive reviews from critics. Kirkus called the book a "compelling character study," and praised Boyne for balancing the book's dark narrative with "amusing jabs at the fame game behind literary life." Writing in The Guardian, Hannah Beckerman called it "an ingeniously conceived novel that confirms Boyne as one of the most assured writers of his generation."

The book was shortlisted for Novel of the Year at the 2018 Irish Book Awards, ultimately losing to Sally Rooney's Normal People.

== Film adaptation ==
A film adaptation was announced in February 2025 with Johan Renck in talks to direct. Edward Berger will be involved as a producer, while production company Fifth Season is considering a deal.
