= William Miller (footballer, born 1996) =

English footballer and actor

- Born: William Finn Miller; 8 June 1996 (age 30); Hackney, England
- Occupations: Actor, footballer
- Television: Krakatoa: The Last Days, Oliver Twist, Runaway
Association football career
- Positions: Midfielder; striker
Youth career
- –2012: Leyton Orient
- 2012–2016: Tottenham Hotspur
Senior career*
Years	Team	Apps	(Gls)
2016–2017	Tottenham Hotspur	0	(0)
2016–2017	→ Burton Albion (loan)	15	(1)
2017–2019	Burton Albion	32	(1)
Total		47	(2)
International career
2013–2014	England U18	3	(0)
- * Club domestic league appearances and goals

William Finn Miller (born 8 June 1996) is an English actor and former professional footballer.

== Early life ==
Miller was born to television director Sam Miller and actress Janine Wood. He played football at Leyton Orient from the age of seven to 12. He first appeared in a documentary drama as Pieter Beijerinck, in a 2006 documentary drama, Krakatoa: The Last Days, directed by his father. He appeared in further productions for a number of years before returning to football.

== Acting career ==
Miller rose to fame when, at the age of 11, he was chosen out of 700 applicants for the titular role in Oliver Twist, the BBC One Christmas adaptation of the Charles Dickens classic of the same name, broadcast in December 2007.

Miller starred as the lead character Sean in the 2009 British children's miniseries Runaway, broadcast on BBC One, which was part of the CBBC season about homelessness.

=== Filmography ===
- Krakatoa: The Last Days (2006) as Pieter Beijerinck
- Oliver Twist (2007) as Oliver Twist
- Runaway (2009) as Sean
- The Kid (2010) as young Kevin

== Football career ==
Having previously played youth football for Leyton Orient, Miller joined Tottenham's development centre when he was 14. He signed a contract when he was 16. He featured regularly for Tottenham's Under-16 team over the course of the 2012–13 season before joining Tottenham full-time in the summer of 2013.

On 21 September 2013, Miller was selected for an England under-18 squad for two matches against Hungary on 11 and 14 October 2013.

On 25 August 2016, Miller joined Burton Albion on loan. His first goal for the club came on 10 September of the same year, a late equaliser against Wolverhampton Wanderers. In January 2018, he injured his knee in a game against Queens Park Rangers, ending the season prematurely for him.

In 2018–19 season, he scored a goal in the 1–1 draw against Plymouth Argyle in December 2018. Miller left Burton Albion at the end of the contract in 2019.

In an interview with The Guardian in April 2020, Miller revealed that he has retired from football and is pursuing a career as a film-maker and musician.

In February 2026, Miller begun playing with non-league side Clapton in the Eastern Counties Football League Division One South.

== Career statistics ==
Appearances and goals by club, season and competition
Club	Season	League			FA Cup		League Cup		Other (Note: Appearance in the EFL Trophy)		Total	
Club	Season	Division	Apps	Goals	Apps	Goals	Apps	Goals	Apps	Goals	Apps	Goals
Tottenham Hotspur	2016–17	Premier League	0	0	0	0	0	0	0	0	0	0
Tottenham Hotspur U-23s	2017–18	Premier League 2, Div 1	—		—		—		1	0	1	0
Burton Albion (loan)	2016–17	Championship	15	1	1	0	0	0	0	0	16	1
Burton Albion	2017–18	Championship	10	0	1	0	0	0	1	0	11	0
Burton Albion	2018–19	League 1	22	1	1	0	1	0	3	0	27	1
Clapton	2025-26	Eastern Counties Football League Division 1 South	3	2	0	0	0	0	0	0	0	0
Career total			47	2	3	0	1	0	4	0	55	2
