= John Boyne =

Irish novelist and youth fiction author (born 1971)

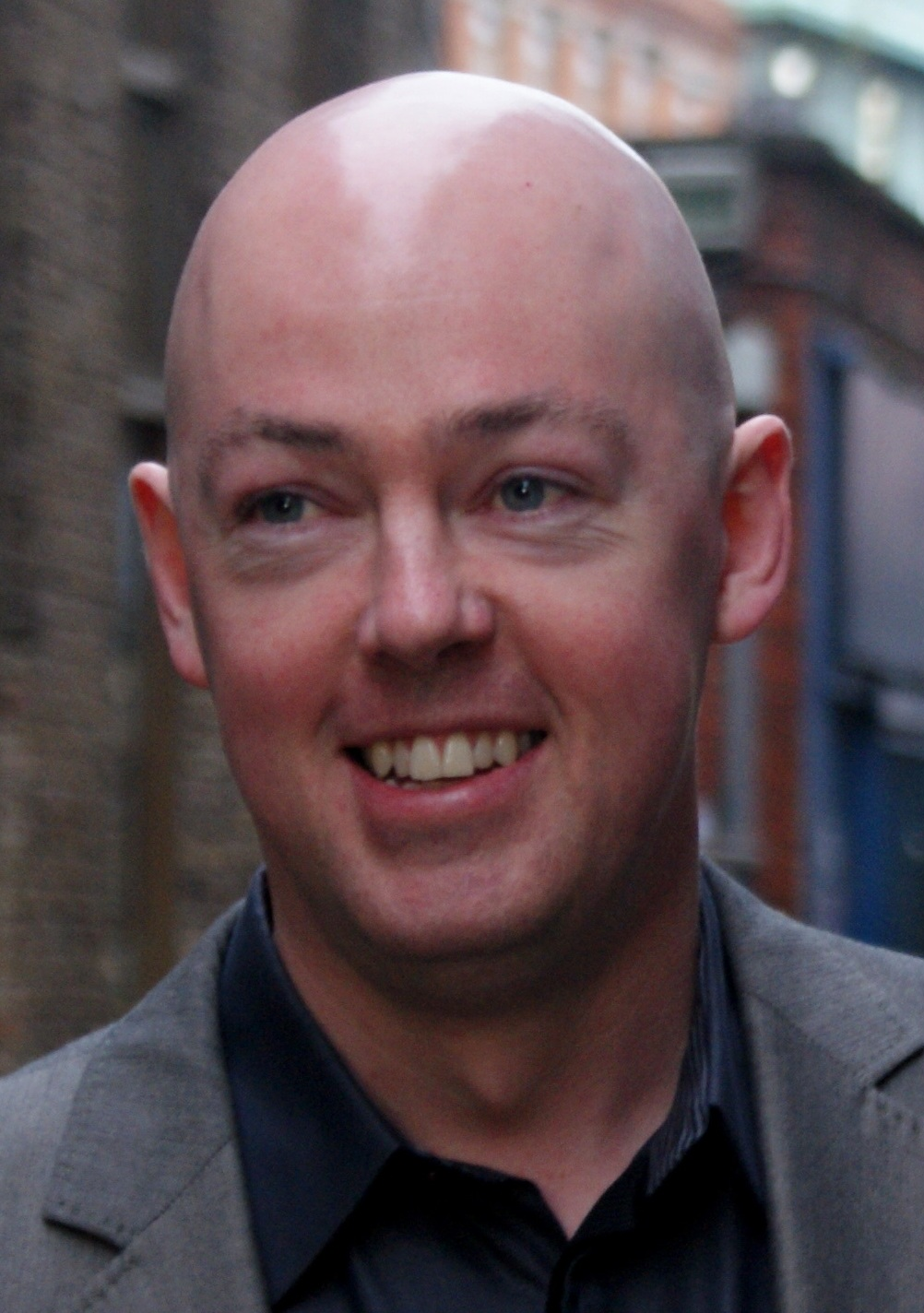
- Boyne in 2010
- Born: 30 April 1971 (age 55); Dublin, Ireland
- Education: Trinity College Dublin (B.A., 1993); University of East Anglia (M.A., 1995)
- Occupations: Author, novelist, writer
- Writing career
- Language: English
- Years active: 2000–present
- Period: Modern
- Genres: Historical fiction, literary fiction
- Notable works: The Boy in the Striped Pyjamas (2006); The Absolutist (2011); All the Broken Places (2022)
- Website: johnboyne.com

John Boyne (born 30 April 1971) is an Irish novelist and writer. He is the author of sixteen novels for adults, six novels for younger readers, two novellas, and one collection of short stories. Boyne's historical novel The Boy in the Striped Pyjamas (2006) received critical acclaim and was adapted into a 2008 drama film of the same name. As of 2022, the book has sold more than 11 million copies worldwide and has been translated into over 58 languages, making it one of the best-selling books of all time. A sequel, titled All the Broken Places, was published in 2022.

== Biography ==
Boyne grew up in Dublin, Ireland, where he still lives. His mother was a homemaker and his father was an insurance broker. He has 3 siblings. He describes his upbringing as "middle class". His first short story was published by the Sunday Tribune and in 1993 was shortlisted for a Hennessy Literary Award.

Boyne was educated at Terenure College, a Carmelite-run secondary school in Dublin. He read English at Trinity College Dublin, graduating BA in 1993. He subsequently obtained an MA in Creative Writing from the University of East Anglia (UEA) in 1995 where he studied under Malcolm Bradbury. In 2015 he was awarded the honorary degree of Doctor of Letters by UEA.

He chaired the jury for the 2015 Scotiabank Giller Prize.

Boyne is gay, and has spoken about the difficulties he encountered growing up gay in Catholic Ireland. He has spoken of suffering physical and sexual abuse at Terenure College as a student.

He regards John Banville as "the world's greatest living writer".

In May 2024, Boyne was the castaway on BBC Radio 4's Desert Island Discs.

== The Boy in the Striped Pyjamas ==
The Boy in the Striped Pyjamas was published in 2006. The book has sold over seven million copies worldwide. A Heyday/Miramax film adaptation, The Boy in the Striped Pyjamas, was shot in Budapest in mid-2007 and released in late 2008. Directed by Mark Herman, the film stars Asa Butterfield, David Thewlis, Vera Farmiga, Rupert Friend and Sheila Hancock. In January 2020, the book was cited by the Auschwitz-Birkenau State Museum, in a set of back and forth tweets between the museum and the author, as a book that should be avoided by those promoting accurate understanding of the Holocaust. In response, Boyne suggested that the museum's criticism contained inaccurate information.

== My Brother's Name Is Jessica ==
Boyne's 2019 book My Brother's Name Is Jessica, about a young boy coming to terms with his older sibling coming out as a trans girl, was criticised by trans activists and social media users over its portrayal of transgender topics and for misgendering people. In an article in The Irish Times promoting the book, Boyne explained that he was inspired to write it by a transgender friend of his, and had spoken to gender-identity professionals and "several trans people" to ensure he portrayed the book's subject matter authentically. However, he received further criticism for stating in the article that "I reject the word 'cis' ... I don't consider myself a cis man; I consider myself a man." He added that "while I will happily employ any term that a person feels best defines them ... I reject the notion that someone can force an unwanted term on to another".

Boyne deleted his Twitter account, citing social media harassment, though he would later rejoin the site. Some writers have supported him. In 2020, comedian and writer Aidan Comerford, who had accused Boyne of transphobia, issued an apology via Twitter. Comerford apologised for the "relentless harassment" that had caused Boyne "great distress". Boyne responded by saying: "I am grateful for Aidan Comerford's apologies and retractions and, outside of that, I have no further comment".

== A Traveller at the Gates of Wisdom ==
In August 2020, it was noticed that A Traveller at the Gates of Wisdom, which takes place in the real world in the year 1 AD, contained a section in which a seamstress refers to the ingredients used to create dyes. However, the listed ingredients were entirely fictional, being taken from the 2017 videogame The Legend of Zelda: Breath of the Wild, and included items such as the "silent princess" flower, "octorok eyeballs", and "the tail of the red lizalfos".

== Political views ==
Boyne identifies as a TERF (trans-exclusionary radical feminist) and described women who support trans inclusion in gendered spaces and the rights of children to access gender-affirming healthcare as "astonishingly complicit in their own erasure", and likened them to Serena Joy, a character from The Handmaid's Tale, who is "ready to pin a handmaiden down as her husband rapes her".

Boyne's nomination in the long list for the 2025 Polari Prize caused two thirds of the other nominees and two judges to withdraw and the award to be cancelled for the year. An open letter and petition by authors Niamh Ní Mhaoileoin and Emma van Straaten called on the prize to withdraw Boyne from the longlist was signed by over 800 writers and people in the publishing industry. Other authors speaking out against Boyne's longlisting included Patrick Ness. Boyne was interpreted as having contemplated suicide as a result of having received "endless harassment at the hands of both strangers and fellow writers", but clarified subsequently that his feeling that he "didn't want to go on" was intended to mean he had thought about abandoning writing. The 2025 prize was "paused" on 18 August as a result of the controversy and Boyne expressed disappointment that nobody from the Polari Prize had contacted him throughout what he described as a "literary scandal". Following the controversy, the University College Dublin's Literary and Historical Society rescinded its decision to award Boyne with the James Joyce Award.

== Selected works ==
=== Novels ===
- 2000: The Thief of Time (Weidenfeld & Nicolson)
- 2001: The Congress of Rough Riders (Weidenfeld & Nicolson)
- 2004: Crippen (Penguin)
- 2006: Next of Kin (Penguin)
- 2008: Mutiny on the Bounty (Doubleday)
- 2009: The House of Special Purpose (Doubleday)
- 2011: The Absolutist (Doubleday)
- 2013: This House Is Haunted (Doubleday)
- 2014: A History of Loneliness (Doubleday)
- 2017: The Heart's Invisible Furies (Doubleday)
- 2018: A Ladder to the Sky (Doubleday)
- 2020: A Traveler at the Gates of Wisdom (Doubleday)
- 2021: The Echo Chamber (Doubleday)
- 2022: All the Broken Places (Doubleday)
- 2023: Water (Doubleday)
- 2024: Earth (Doubleday)
- 2024: Fire (Doubleday)
- 2025: Air (Doubleday)
- 2026: The Weight of Angels (Henry Holt and Co)

=== Novels for younger readers ===
- 2006: The Boy in the Striped Pyjamas (David Fickling Books)
- 2010: Noah Barleywater Runs Away (David Fickling Books)
- 2012: The Terrible Thing That Happened To Barnaby Brocket (Doubleday Children's)
- 2013: Stay Where You Are And Then Leave (Doubleday Children's)
- 2015: The Boy at the Top of the Mountain (Doubleday Children's)
- 2019: My Brother's Name Is Jessica (Puffin)
- 2024: The Dog Who Danced on the Moon (Penguin)

=== Novellas ===
- 2008: The Second Child (New Island Books)
- 2009: The Dare (Black Swan Books)

=== Short story collections ===
- 2015: Beneath The Earth (Doubleday)

== Awards ==
- The Boy in the Striped Pyjamas: winner: Irish Book Awards Children's Book of the Year; Irish Book Awards Radio 1 Book of the Year; Qué Leer Award Best International Novel of the Year (Spain); Orange Prize Readers Group: Book of the Year; Children's Books Ireland Book of the Year. Shortlist: Irish Book Award Novel of the Year; British Book Award; the Border's New Voices Award; the Ottar's Children's Book Prize; the Paolo Ungari Literary Award (Italy); Deutscher Jugendliteraturpreis (Germany). Longlist: The Carnegie Medal; the International IMPAC Literary Award
- Noah Barleywater Runs Away: shortlisted for Irish Book Awards Children's Book of the Year; Sheffield Children's Book Award, Hull Children's Book Award; Longlist: The Carnegie Medal
- The Terrible Thing That Happened to Barnaby Brocket: shortlisted for Irish Book Awards: Children's Book of the Year; Longlist: The Carnegie Medal
- The Absolutist: Longlist: International Dublin Literary Award
- Stay Where You Are And Then Leave: shortlisted for Irish Book Awards Children's Book of the Year; Deutscher Jugendliteraturpreis (Germany)
- A History of Loneliness: shortlisted for Irish Book Awards Novel of the Year
- The Boy At The Top Of The Mountain: shortlisted for Irish Book Awards Children's Book of the Year; Children's Books Ireland Book of the Year
- The Heart's Invisible Furies: shortlisted for Irish Book Awards Novel of the Year
- The "Invisible Furies": 2017 Book of the Year for Book of the Month
- A Ladder to the Sky: shortlisted for Irish Book Awards Novel of the Year; Kerry Group Irish Novel of the Year Award
- The Elements: 2025 winner Prix du roman Fnac, 2025 winner Prix Femina étranger.

Other Awards:

- 2012: Hennessy Literary Award Hall of Fame
- 2014: Winner: Irish Book Awards: Short Story of the Year ("Rest Day")
- 2015: Shortlist: Irish Book Awards: Short Story of the Year ("Boy, 19")
- 2015: Gustav Heinemann Peace Prize (Germany)
