= The House of Special Purpose (novel) =

2009 novel by John Boyne

- Author: John Boyne
- Language: English
- Publication date: 2009

The House of Special Purpose is a novel written by Irish novelist John Boyne. It was first published in 2009 by Doubleday and re-published by Other Press in 2013.
