= Ashley Rolfe =

F15 fighter pilot

Ashley Rolfe is one of the United States Air Force female fighter pilots who qualified to fly McDonnell Douglas F-15 Eagle. As a member of the Massachusetts Air National Guard, she makes history at the 104th Fighter Wing as the first female fighter pilot in the wing's 70-year history on 18 August 2016. She served in 67th Fighter Squadron at Kadena Air Base. Kadena was Rolfe's first duty assignment, where she also made history by serving in the 67th Fighter Squadron as the only female F-15 pilot. In 2010, she was the only female fighter pilot participating in Exercise Commando Sling that appeared in Air Force TV News "One of a Kind".

Video: The only female fighter pilot participating in Exercise Commando Sling

Rolfe graduated United States Air Force Academy. She completed pilot training in 2007, fulfilling her lifelong dream to become an F-15 Eagle fighter pilot. She has served in the active-duty Air Force for 11 years. In addition to serving at Tyndall, she has been stationed as a fighter pilot at Kadena Air Base in Japan and Nellis Air Force Base in Nevada. She has been deployed twice, most recently to Afghanistan for six months. She flew T-38 aircraft in an aggressor role as part of the F-22 Raptor fighter program at her previous duty assignment at Tyndall before coming to the 104th. She is married and has one daughter.

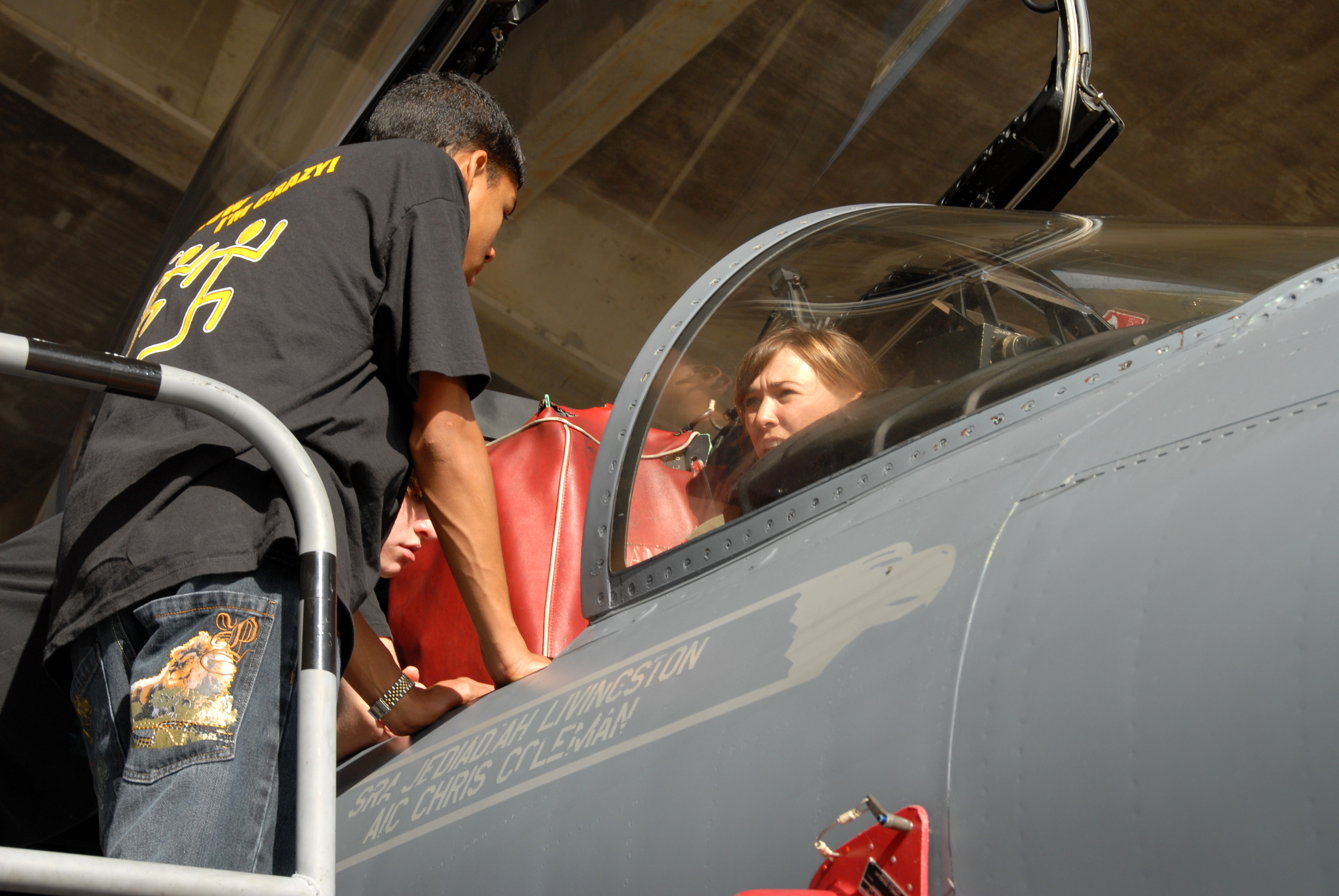
Ashley at Kadena as F-15 Pilot

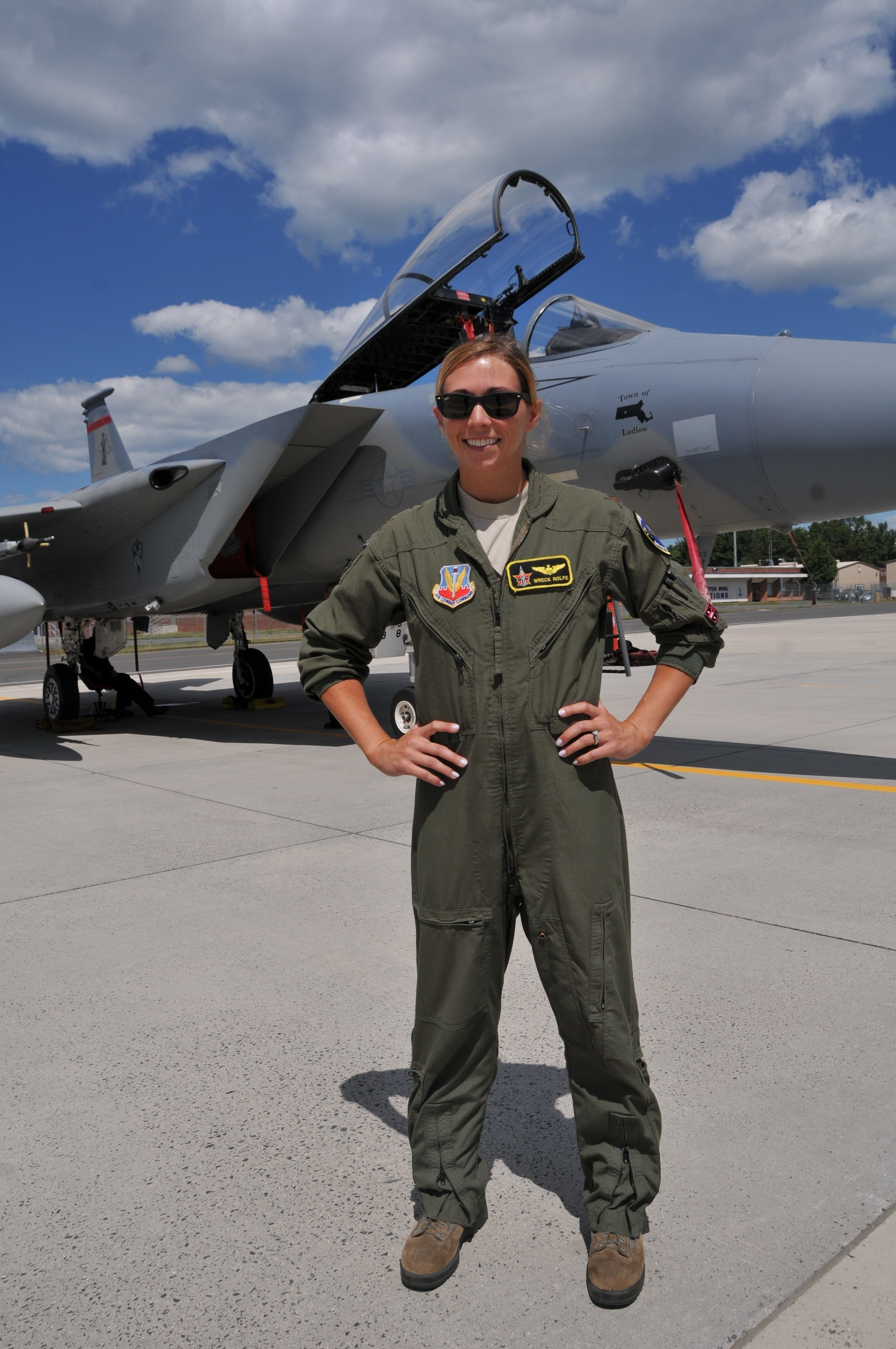
at Massachusetts ANG's 104th FW

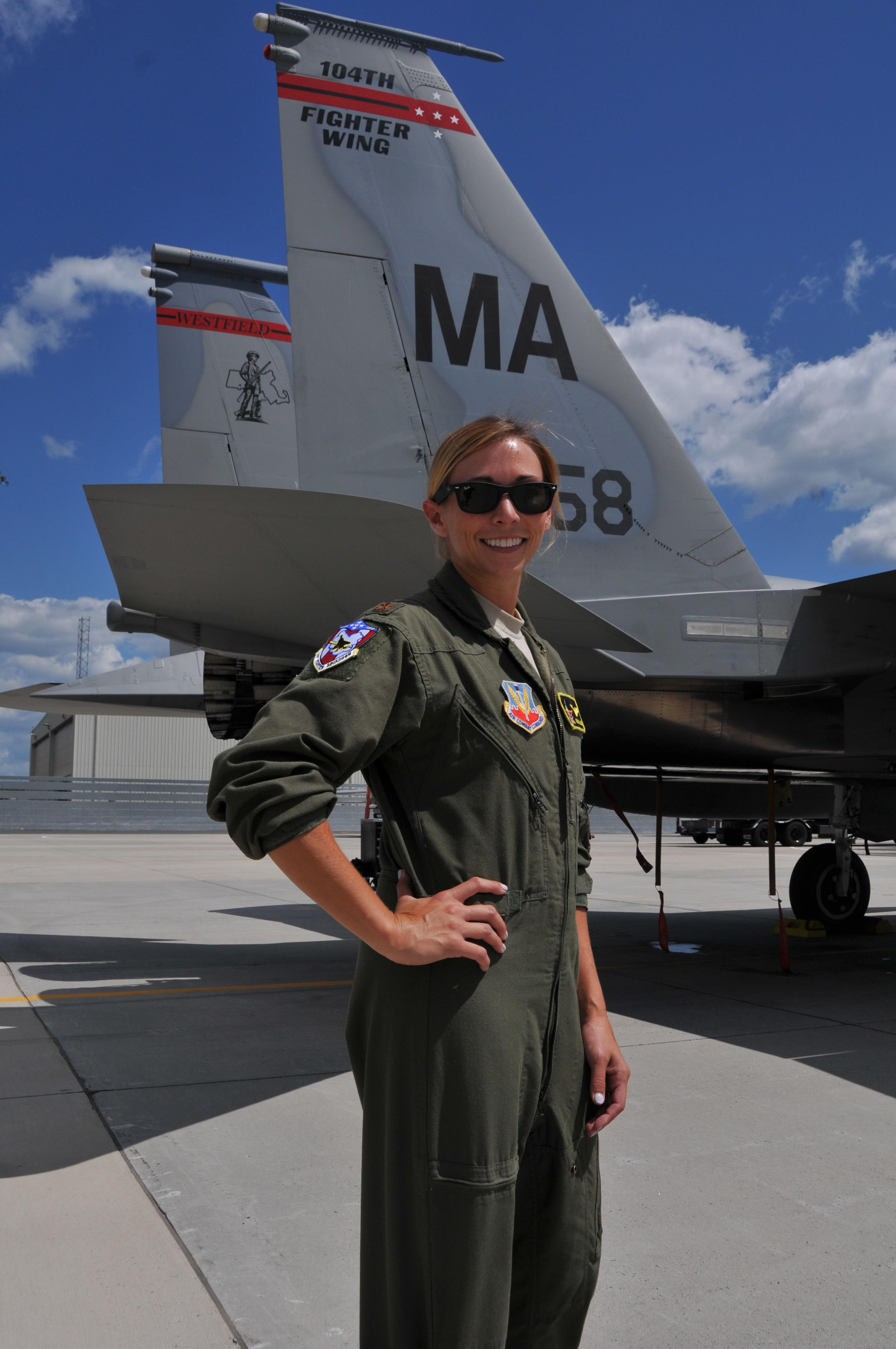
