= Liam Slade =

English footballer (born 1995)

Personal information
- Full name: Liam John Slade
- Date of birth: 14 May 1995 (age 31)
- Place of birth: Stourbridge, England
- Position: Defender

Youth career
- ?–2013: Burton Albion

Senior career*
Years	Team	Apps	(Gls)
2013–2016	Burton Albion	6	(0)
2013	→ Redditch United (loan)		
2015	→ AFC Telford United (loan)	2	(0)
2016	→ Brackley Town (loan)	14	(0)
2016	North Ferriby United	4	(0)
2016–2017	Sutton Coldfield Town		
2017	Halesowen Town		
2017–	Stourbridge	2	(0)
- * Club domestic league appearances and goals as of 12 April 2017 (UTC)

Liam John Slade (born 14 May 1995) is an English footballer who plays as a defender.

== Career ==
After coming through Burton Albion's youth system, Slade signed a professional contract in July 2013. In November 2013, Slade joined Redditch United on a one-month loan deal. Slade made his début for Burton Albion in a 3–1 away loss to Bury on 20 September 2014 in League Two.

== Career statistics ==
As of match played 11 October 2014

Appearances and goals by club, season and competition
Club	Season	League			FA Cup		League Cup		Other		Total	
Club	Season	Division	Apps	Goals	Apps	Goals	Apps	Goals	Apps	Goals	Apps	Goals
Burton Albion	2014–15	League Two	2	0	0	0	1	0	0	0	3	0
Career total			2	0	0	0	1	0	0	0	3	0
