= Dylan Hill =

English footballer (born 2004)

Personal information
- Full name: Dylan John Hill
- Date of birth: 22 April 2004 (age 22)
- Place of birth: Northampton, England
- Position: Midfielder

Team information
- Current team: Boston United.
- Number: 24

Youth career
- Brixworth Junior
- 2015–2022: Northampton Town

Senior career*
| Years | Team | Apps | (Gls) |
| 2022–2023 | Northampton Town | 0 | (0) |
| 2023– | Boston United | 109 | (3) |
- * Club domestic league appearances and goals as of 00:00, 9 May 2024 (UTC)

Dylan John Hill (born 22 April 2004) is an English professional footballer who plays as a midfielder for National League club Boston United

== Career ==
Hill began at apprenticeship at Northampton Town at the start of the 2021–22 season following a year as an extended schoolboy, and in April was recognised by the League Football Education (LFE) in "The 11" after he overcame learning difficulties and dyscalculia to achieve well above his predicted grade on the BTEC Diploma at Moulton School. He made his first-team debut for the club on 20 September 2022, after coming on as a half-time substitute for Ben Fox in a 2–0 defeat to Cambridge United in an EFL Trophy match at Sixfields Stadium. Hill said that "I am speechless, and the experience I have got there is unreal".

== Style of play ==
Hill is a midfielder with good ball-control skills.

== Career statistics ==
As of match played 9 May 2024

Appearances and goals by club, season and competition
| Club | Season | League | | | FA Cup | | EFL Cup | | Other | | Total | |
| Club | Season | Division | Apps | Goals | Apps | Goals | Apps | Goals | Apps | Goals | Apps | Goals |
|---|---|---|---|---|---|---|---|---|---|---|---|---|
| Northampton Town | 2022–23 | League Two | 0 | 0 | 0 | 0 | 0 | 0 | 2 (Note: Appearances in the EFL Trophy) | 0 | 2 | 0 |
| Boston United | 2023–24 | National League North | 34 | 1 | 3 | 0 | — | | 4 (Note: 1 appearance in the FA Trophy) | 0 | 41 | 1 |
| Career total | | | 34 | 1 | 3 | 0 | 0 | 0 | 6 | 0 | 43 | 1 |
