= 2017–18 Burton Albion F.C. season =

Burton Albion
2017–18 season
- Chairman: Ben Robinson
- Manager: Nigel Clough
- Stadium: Pirelli Stadium
- Championship: 23rd (relegated)
- FA Cup: Third round (Vs. Birmingham City)
- League Cup: Third round (Vs. Manchester United)
- Top goalscorer: League: Lloyd Dyer (7); All: Lloyd Dyer (7)
- Average home league attendance: 4,645
Home colours	Away colours

The 2017–18 season was Burton Albion's 68th season in their history and second consecutive season in the Championship. Along with competing in the Championship, the club will also participate in the FA Cup and League Cup. The season covered the period from 1 July 2017 to 30 June 2018.

== Squad ==
No.	Name	Pos.	Nationality	Place of birth	Age	Apps	Goals	Signed from	Date signed	Fee	End
Goalkeepers
1	Stephen Bywater	GK	(England)	Oldham	45	50	0	Kerala Blasters	16 January 2016	Free	2019
24	Harry Campbell	GK	(England)	Blackburn	30	0	0	Bolton Wanderers	25 August 2016	Free	2018
Defenders
2	John Brayford	RB	(England)	Stoke-on-Trent	38	146	7	Sheffield United	31 August 2017	Free	2019
5	Kyle McFadzean	CB	(England)	Sheffield	39	77	1	Milton Keynes Dons	12 July 2016	Free	2019
6	Ben Turner	CB	(England)	Birmingham	38	72	3	Cardiff City	1 July 2016	Free	2019
12	Tom Flanagan	RB	(Northern Ireland) (England)	Hammersmith	35	82	2	Milton Keynes Dons	25 August 2015	Free	2019
14	Damien McCrory	LWB	(Republic of Ireland)	Limerick	36	205	10	Dagenham & Redbridge	1 July 2012	Free	2018
15	Tom Naylor	CB	(England)	Sutton-in-Ashfield	35	133	13	Derby County	1 July 2015	Free	2019
23	Jake Buxton	RB	(England)	Sutton-in-Ashfield	41	76	0	Wigan Athletic	1 July 2017	Free	2018
25	Shaun Barker	CB	(England)	Trowell	44	6	0	Derby County	26 August 2016	Free	2018
29	Tomas Egert	CB	(Czech Republic)		32	3	0	Free agent	16 March 2018	Free	2018
Midfielders
4	Jamie Allen	CM	(England)	Rochdale	31	28	1	Rochdale	31 August 2017	Undisclosed	2020
7	Luke Murphy	CM	(England)	Macclesfield	37	61	2	Leeds United	3 July 2017	Loan	2018
11	Lloyd Dyer	LW	(England)	Birmingham	44	83	15	Burnley	25 July 2016	Free	2018
18	William Miller	AM	(England)	London	30	25	1	Tottenham Hotspur	31 August 2017	Undisclosed	2019
19	Jacob Davenport	CM	(England)		27	16	1	Manchester City	31 January 2018	Loan	2018
21	Hope Akpan	CM	(Nigeria) (England)	Liverpool	35	27	2	Blackburn Rovers	18 July 2017	Free	2018
22	Ben Fox	CM	(England)	Burton upon Trent	28	4	1	Academy	1 July 2016	Trainee	2020
26	Joe Sbarra	CM	(England)	Lichfield	27	19	0	Academy	1 July 2017	Trainee	2020
Forwards
9	Darren Bent	CF	(England)	Tooting	42	14	2	Derby County	26 January 2018	Loan	2018
10	Lucas Akins	CF/LWB	(England)	Huddersfield	37	173	33	Stevenage	1 July 2014	Free	Undisclosed
16	Luke Varney	CF	(England)	Leicester	44	34	2	Ipswich Town	4 January 2017	Free	2018
17	Marvin Sordell	CF	(England)	Pinner	35	64	7	Coventry City	1 January 2017	Loan	2018
20	Martin Samuelsen	SS	(Norway)	Haugesund	29	9	0	West Ham United	17 January 2018	Loan	2018
27	Liam Boyce	CF	(Northern Ireland)	Belfast	35	15	3	Ross County	1 July 2017	Undisclosed	2020

== Statistics ==
As of 9 May 2018

No.	Pos	Nat	Player	Total		Championship		FA Cup		League Cup	
No.	Pos	Nat	Player	Apps	Goals	Apps	Goals	Apps	Goals	Apps	Goals
1	GK	(England) ENG	Stephen Bywater	44	0	43+0	0	1+0	0	0+0	0
2	DF	(England) ENG	John Brayford	29	0	27+1	0	1+0	0	0+0	0
3	DF	(England) ENG	Stephen Warnock	14	1	13+1	1	0+0	0	0+0	0
4	MF	(England) ENG	Jamie Allen	28	1	18+10	1	0+0	0	0+0	0
5	DF	(England) ENG	Kyle McFadzean	44	0	38+3	0	1+0	0	1+1	0
6	DF	(England) ENG	Ben Turner	32	2	26+4	2	1+0	0	1+0	0
7	MF	(England) ENG	Luke Murphy	40	1	34+4	1	1+0	0	0+1	0
9	FW	(England) ENG	Darren Bent	14	2	9+5	2	0+0	0	0+0	0
10	FW	(England) ENG	Lucas Akins	45	6	39+3	5	1+0	0	2+0	1
11	MF	(England) ENG	Lloyd Dyer	38	7	29+8	7	1+0	0	0+0	0
12	DF	(Northern Ireland) NIR	Tom Flanagan	29	2	20+7	2	1+0	0	1+0	0
14	DF	(Republic of Ireland) IRL	Damien McCrory	12	0	8+2	0	0+0	0	2+0	0
15	DF	(England) ENG	Tom Naylor	35	4	31+1	3	1+0	0	2+0	1
16	FW	(England) ENG	Luke Varney	18	1	1+16	0	0+0	0	1+0	1
17	FW	(England) ENG	Marvin Sordell	42	3	29+10	3	0+1	0	0+2	0
19	MF	(England) ENG	Jacob Davenport	16	1	14+2	1	0+0	0	0+0	0
20	FW	(Norway) NOR	Martin Samuelsen	9	0	7+2	0	0+0	0	0+0	0
21	MF	(Nigeria) NGR	Hope Akpan	27	2	18+7	2	0+1	0	1+0	0
22	MF	(England) ENG	Ben Fox	2	1	0+0	0	0+0	0	2+0	1
23	DF	(England) ENG	Jake Buxton	32	0	29+2	0	1+0	0	0+0	0
25	DF	(England) ENG	Shaun Barker	1	0	0+1	0	0+0	0	0+0	0
26	MF	(England) ENG	Joe Sbarra	19	0	4+12	0	0+1	0	2+0	0
27	FW	(Northern Ireland) NIR	Liam Boyce	15	3	11+4	3	0+0	0	0+0	0
29	DF	(Czech Republic) CZE	Tomas Egert	3	0	0+3	0	0+0	0	0+0	0
Player(s) out on loan:
8	MF	(Northern Ireland) NIR	Matty Lund	12	2	9+2	1	0+0	0	0+1	1
Player(s) who left the club:
4	MF	(England) ENG	John Mousinho	2	0	1+0	0	0+0	0	1+0	0
9	FW	(Republic of Ireland) IRL	Sean Scannell	19	0	13+5	0	0+0	0	1+0	0
13	GK	(England) ENG	Connor Ripley	4	0	2+0	0	0+0	0	2+0	0
18	FW	(England) ENG	Will Miller	11	0	7+3	0	1+0	0	0+0	0
19	MF	(England) ENG	Matt Palmer	13	1	8+3	1	0+0	0	2+0	0
20	FW	(England) ENG	Joe Mason	6	1	3+3	1	0+0	0	0+0	0
36	MF	(Australia) AUS	Jackson Irvine	5	1	3+0	1	0+0	0	1+1	0

=== Goals record ===
As of 9 May 2018

Rank	No.	Nat.	Po.	Name	Championship	FA Cup	League Cup	Total
1	11	(England)	LW	Lloyd Dyer	7	0	0	7
2	10	(England)	LW	Lucas Akins	5	0	1	6
3	15	(England)	CB	Tom Naylor	3	0	1	4
4	17	(England)	CF	Marvin Sordell	3	0	0	3
4	27	(Northern Ireland)	CF	Liam Boyce	3	0	0	3
6	6	(England)	CB	Ben Turner	2	0	0	2
6	8	(Northern Ireland)	CM	Matty Lund	1	0	1	2
6	9	(England)	CF	Darren Bent	2	0	0	2
6	12	(Northern Ireland)	CB	Tom Flanagan	2	0	0	2
6	21	(England)	CM	Hope Akpan	2	0	0	2
11	3	(England)	LB	Stephen Warnock	1	0	0	1
11	4	(England)	CM	Jamie Allen	1	0	0	1
11	7	(England)	CM	Luke Murphy	1	0	0	1
11	16	(England)	CF	Luke Varney	0	0	1	1
11	19	(England)	CM	Jacob Davenport	1	0	0	1
11	22	(England)	CM	Ben Fox	0	0	1	1
11	—	(Australia)	CM	Jackson Irvine	1	0	0	1
11	—	(England)	CF	Joe Mason	1	0	0	1
11	—	(England)	LM	Matt Palmer	1	0	0	1
Total					37	0	5	42

==== Disciplinary record ====
As of 9 May 2018

Rank	No.	Nat.	Po.	Name	Championship			FA Cup			League Cup			Total		
Rank	No.	Nat.	Po.	Name	Yellow card	(yellow card) (yellow-red card)	Red card	Yellow card	(yellow card) (yellow-red card)	Red card	Yellow card	(yellow card) (yellow-red card)	Red card	Yellow card	(yellow card) (yellow-red card)	Red card
1	15	(England)	CB	Tom Naylor	10	0	0	0	0	0	0	0	0	10	0	0
2	5	(England)	CB	Kyle McFadzean	8	0	0	0	0	0	0	0	0	8	0	0
3	7	(England)	CM	Luke Murphy	7	0	0	0	0	0	0	0	0	7	0	0
4	6	(England)	CB	Ben Turner	5	0	0	1	0	0	0	0	0	6	0	0
4	10	(England)	LW	Lucas Akins	5	0	0	0	0	0	1	0	0	6	0	0
6	23	(England)	RB	Jake Buxton	5	0	0	0	0	0	0	0	0	5	0	0
7	1	(England)	GK	Stephen Bywater	4	0	0	0	0	0	0	0	0	4	0	0
8	2	(England)	RB	John Brayford	2	0	0	1	0	0	0	0	0	3	0	0
8	12	(Northern Ireland)	CB	Tom Flanagan	3	0	0	0	0	0	0	0	0	3	0	0
10	3	(England)	LB	Stephen Warnock	2	0	0	0	0	0	0	0	0	2	0	0
10	8	(Northern Ireland)	CM	Matty Lund	2	0	0	0	0	0	0	0	0	2	0	0
10	14	(Republic of Ireland)	CB	Damien McCrory	2	0	0	0	0	0	0	0	0	2	0	0
10	21	(Nigeria)	CM	Hope Akpan	1	0	1	0	0	0	0	0	0	1	0	1
10	27	(Northern Ireland)	CF	Liam Boyce	2	0	0	0	0	0	0	0	0	2	0	0
10	—	(Australia)	CM	Jackson Irvine	0	1	0	0	0	0	1	0	0	1	0	1
16	4	(England)	CM	Jamie Allen	1	0	0	0	0	0	0	0	0	1	0	0
16	9	(England)	CF	Darren Bent	1	0	0	0	0	0	0	0	0	1	0	0
16	11	(England)	LW	Lloyd Dyer	1	0	0	0	0	0	0	0	0	1	0	0
16	16	(England)	CF	Luke Varney	1	0	0	0	0	0	0	0	0	1	0	0
16	17	(England)	CF	Marvin Sordell	0	0	0	1	0	0	0	0	0	1	0	0
16	19	(England)	CM	Jacob Davenport	1	0	0	0	0	0	0	0	0	1	0	0
16	20	(Norway)	SS	Martin Samuelsen	1	0	0	0	0	0	0	0	0	1	0	0
16	26	(England)	CM	Joe Sbarra	1	0	0	0	0	0	0	0	0	1	0	0
Total					66	1	1	3	0	0	2	0	0	70	1	1

== Transfers ==
=== Transfers in ===
Date from	Position	Nationality	Name	From	Fee	Ref.
1 July 2017	CF	(Northern Ireland)	Liam Boyce	Ross County	Undisclosed	
1 July 2017	CB	(England)	Jake Buxton	Wigan Athletic	Free	
1 July 2017	CM	(Northern Ireland)	Matty Lund	Rochdale	Free	
1 July 2017	LB	(England)	Stephen Warnock	Wigan Athletic	Free	
18 July 2017	CM	(Nigeria)	Hope Akpan	Blackburn Rovers	Free	
31 August 2017	CM	(England)	Jamie Allen	Rochdale	Undisclosed	
31 August 2017	RB	(England)	John Brayford	Sheffield United	Free	
31 August 2017	AM	(England)	William Miller	Tottenham Hotspur	Undisclosed	

=== Transfers out ===
Date from	Position	Nationality	Name	To	Fee	Ref.
1 July 2017	RB	(England)	Phil Edwards	Bury	Released	(Note: Phil Edwards joined Bury following his release.)
1 July 2017	MF	(England)	Charlie Gatter	Free agent	Released	
1 July 2017	GK	(England)	Sam Hornby	Port Vale	Free	
1 July 2017	GK	(Scotland)	Jon McLaughlin	Heart of Midlothian	Released	(Note: Jon McLaughlin joined Heart of Midlothian following his release.)
1 July 2017	CM	(Republic of Ireland)	Callum Reilly	Bury	Released	(Note: Callum Reilly joined Bury following his release.)
1 July 2017	CM	(Jamaica)	Lee Williamson	Free agent	Released	
30 August 2017	AM	(Australia)	Jackson Irvine	Hull City	Undisclosed	
31 August 2017	CB	(England)	John Mousinho	Oxford United	Free	

=== Loans in ===
Date from	Position	Nationality	Name	From	Date until	Ref.
3 July 2017	CM	(England)	Luke Murphy	Leeds United	30 June 2018	
7 August 2017	GK	(England)	Connor Ripley	Middlesbrough	30 June 2018	
18 August 2017	RW	(Republic of Ireland)	Sean Scannell	Huddersfield Town	11 January 2018 (Note: Scannell's season-long loan was cut short on 11 January due to a serious injury.)	
23 August 2017	CF	(Republic of Ireland)	Joe Mason	Wolverhampton Wanderers	2 January 2018	

=== Loans out ===
Date from	Position	Nationality	Name	To	Date until	Ref.
1 July 2017	LB	(Republic of Ireland)	Ryan Delaney	Cork City	1 November 2017	
18 July 2017	RW	(England)	Marcus Harness	Port Vale	30 June 2018	
14 August 2017	FW	(England)	Marcus Dinanga	AFC Telford United	30 June 2018	
31 August 2017	LB	(Republic of Ireland)	Damien McCrory	Portsmouth	January 2018	
1 September 2017	DF	(England)	Jayden Cotterill	Matlock Town	29 September 2017	
5 September 2017	GK	(England)	Callum Hawkins	Matlock Town	3 October 2017	
8 September 2017	CM	(England)	Ben Fox	Solihull Moors	7 October 2017	
26 October 2017	CM	(England)	Ben Fox	Tamworth	28 November 2017	(Note: On 28 November, Ben Fox was recalled from his loan spell at Tamworth.)
17 November 2017	DF	(England)	Jayden Cotterill	Romulus	14 January 2018	(Note: On 14 December, Jayden Cotterill extended his youth loan with Romulus until mid-January.)
8 December 2017	MF	(England)	Jack Hallahan	Belper Town	8 January 2018	

== Pre-season ==
=== Friendlies ===
As of 7 June 2017, Burton Albion have announced ten pre-season friendlies against Leicester City, West Bromwich Albion, Shrewsbury Town, Matlock Town, Mickleover Sports, AFC Wimbledon, Kidsgrove Athletic, Solihull Moors, Rocester and Arnold Town.

12 July 2017	Kidsgrove Athletic	0–5	Burton Albion	Kidsgrove
19:30 BST		Report	Lund 2'; Dinanga 61'; Fox 64', 81'; Irvine 81'	Stadium: The Novus Stadium

14 July 2017	Mickleover Sports	0–4	Burton Albion	Mickleover
19:30 BST		Report	Varney 70'; Harness 79'; Dinanga 86'; Lund 90' (pen.)	Stadium: Don Amott Arena

18 July 2017	Solihull Moors	1–2	Burton Albion	Solihull
19:30 BST	Benbow 72'	Report	Lund 69'; Sordell 83'	Stadium: Damson Park

21 July 2017	AFC Wimbledon	3–0	Burton Albion	Kingston upon Thames
19:45 BST	Parrett 42'; McDonald 45'; Antwi-Nyame 83'	Report		Stadium: Kingsmeadow

22 July 2017	Matlock Town	2–2	Burton Albion XI	Matlock
15:00 BST	Trialist 18'; Trialist 20'	Report	Sbarra 6'; Dinanga 34'	Stadium: Causeway Lane

24 July 2017	Rocester	4–1	Burton Albion XI	Rocester
19:30 BST	Ritchie-Smith 2'; Riddell 16'; Wesson 72', 76'	Report	Clamp 80'	Stadium: Hillsfield

26 July 2017	Burton Albion	0–1	West Bromwich Albion	Burton upon Trent
19:45 BST		Report	Rodriguez 77'	Stadium: Pirelli Stadium

27 July 2017	Arnold Town	0–9	Burton Albion	Arnold
19:30 BST		Report	Dinanga 12', 24'; Sbarra 35'; Naylor 54'; Palmer 58'; Fox 74'; Davies 79', 85'; Hallahan 89'	Stadium: Eagle Valley

29 July 2017	Shrewsbury Town	1–0	Burton Albion	Shrewsbury
15:00 BST	Whalley 85' (pen.)	Report		Stadium: Greenhous Meadow

1 August 2017	Burton Albion	2–1	Leicester City	Burton upon Trent
19:45 BST	Akpan 17'; Akins 30'	Report	Maguire 66'	Stadium: Pirelli Stadium

== Competitions ==
=== Championship ===
==== League table ====
Pos	Team	Pld	W	D	L	GF	GA	GD	Pts	Promotion, qualification or relegation
20	Reading	46	10	14	22	48	70	−22	44	
21	Bolton Wanderers	46	10	13	23	39	74	−35	43	
22	Barnsley (R)	46	9	14	23	48	72	−24	41	Relegation to EFL League One
23	Burton Albion (R)	46	10	11	25	38	81	−43	41	Relegation to EFL League One
24	Sunderland (R)	46	7	16	23	52	80	−28	37	Relegation to EFL League One

Source: English Football League
Rules for classification: 1) Points; 2) Goal difference; 3) Number of goals scored
(R) Relegated

==== Result summary ====
Overall								Home						Away					
Pld	W	D	L	GF	GA	GD	Pts	W	D	L	GF	GA	GD	W	D	L	GF	GA	GD
46	10	11	25	38	81	−43	41	4	5	14	19	42	−23	6	6	11	19	39	−20

Last updated: 6 May 2018.

==== Results by matchday ====
Matchday	1	2	3	4	5	6	7	8	9	10	11	12	13	14	15	16	17	18	19	20	21	22	23	24	25	26	27	28	29	30	31	32	33	34	35	36	37	38	39	40	41	42	43	44	45	46
Ground	H	A	A	H	H	A	A	H	A	H	H	A	A	H	H	A	H	A	H	A	H	A	A	H	H	A	H	A	H	A	A	H	A	H	H	A	H	A	A	H	A	H	H	A	H	A
Result	L	L	L	W	D	L	D	W	D	L	L	D	L	L	L	W	L	D	L	L	L	W	W	L	D	W	L	L	L	L	D	D	W	L	L	L	D	L	L	D	D	L	W	W	W	L
Position	19	24	24	19	21	22	21	20	19	19	21	20	22	22	23	21	21	22	23	24	24	22	21	21	23	22	22	24	24	24	24	24	22	23	23	23	23	23	24	24	24	24	23	23	22	23

Updated to match(es) played on 6 May 2018. Source: Statto.com
A = Away; H = Home; W = Win; D = Draw; L = Loss

==== Matches ====
On 21 June 2017, the league fixtures were announced.

5 August 2017 1	Burton Albion	0–1	Cardiff City	Burton upon Trent
15:00 BST	McFadzean (yellow card) 4'	Report	Zohore 87'	Stadium: Pirelli Stadium; Attendance: 5,050; Referee: Geoff Eltringham

12 August 2017 2	Hull City	4–1	Burton Albion	Kingston upon Hull
15:00 BST	Hernández 7', 54', 61' Grosicki 51'	Report	Irvine 33'	Stadium: KCOM Stadium

15 August 2017 3	Middlesbrough	2–0	Burton Albion	Middlesbrough
19:45 BST	Clayton (yellow card) 12'; Assombalonga 23', 60'	Report	Lund (yellow card) 26'; Naylor (yellow card) 70'; Akpan (red card) 78'	Stadium: Riverside Stadium; Attendance: 24,522; Referee: Tim Robinson

18 August 2017 4	Burton Albion	2–1	Birmingham City	Burton upon Trent
19:45 BST	Sordell 50'; Dyer 66'; Bywater (yellow card) 90+5'	Report	Maghoma 29'	Stadium: Pirelli Stadium; Attendance: 4,948; Referee: Tony Harrington

26 August 2017 5	Burton Albion	1–1	Sheffield Wednesday	Burton upon Trent
15:00 BST	Mason 65'	Report	Hooper 36'; Jones (yellow card) 86'; Fox (yellow card) 90'	Stadium: Pirelli Stadium; Attendance: 5,084; Referee: Darren Bond

9 September 2017 6	Leeds United	5–0	Burton Albion	Leeds
15:00 BST	Lasogga 20', 59'; Phillips 35'; Hernández 44' (pen.); Roofe 54'	Report	McFadzean (yellow card) 34'	Stadium: Elland Road; Attendance: 33,404; Referee: Oliver Langford

12 September 2017 7	Norwich City	0–0	Burton Albion	Norwich
19:45 BST	Vrančić (yellow card) 62'; Jerome (yellow card) 90+2'; Klose (yellow card) 90+5'	Report	Murphy (yellow card) 54'; Buxton (yellow card) 90+3'	Stadium: Carrow Road; Attendance: 24,841; Referee: Andy Davies

16 September 2017 8	Burton Albion	2–1	Fulham	Burton upon Trent
15:00 BST	Warnock 12'; Akins 51' (pen.); MacFadzean (yellow card) 86'	Report	Norwood 31'; Ojo (yellow card) 40'	Stadium: Pirelli Stadium; Attendance: 4,049; Referee: Steve Martin

23 September 2017 9	Queens Park Rangers	0–0	Burton Albion	Shepherd's Bush, London
15:00 BST		Report		Stadium: Loftus Road; Attendance: 12,500; Referee: Andrew Madley

26 September 2017 10	Burton Albion	0–4	Aston Villa	Burton upon Trent
19:45 BST		Report	Davis 13'; Adomah 16'; Snodgrass 32'; Onomah 71'	Stadium: Pirelli Stadium; Attendance: 5,786; Referee: Jon Moss

30 September 2017 11	Burton Albion	0–4	Wolverhampton Wanderers	Burton upon Trent
15:00 BST	Varney (yellow card) 78'	Report	Diogo Jota 5'; Saïss 11'; Rúben Vinagre 41'; Léo Bonatini 62'	Stadium: Pirelli Stadium; Attendance: 5,080; Referee: Tony Harrington

13 October 2017 12	Bristol City	0–0	Burton Albion	Ashton Gate
19:45 BST		Report	Turner (yellow card) 70'	Stadium: Ashton Gate Stadium; Attendance: 18,212; Referee: James Linington

21 October 2017 13	Nottingham Forest	2–0	Burton Albion	West Bridgford
15:00 BST	McKay 58'; Lichaj 78'	Report	Turner (yellow card) 47'; Murphy (yellow card) 57'	Stadium: City Ground; Attendance: 24,686; Referee: Keith Stroud

28 October 2017 14	Burton Albion	1–2	Ipswich Town	Burton upon Trent
15:00 BST	Turner 57'; Warnock (yellow card) 89'	Report	Chambers (yellow card) 53'; Waghorn 66' (yellow card) 79'; Celina 89' (yellow card) 90'	Stadium: Pirelli Stadium; Attendance: 4,110; Referee: Simon Hooper

31 October 2017 15	Burton Albion	2–4	Barnsley	Burton upon Trent
19:45 GMT	Lund 38'; Dyer 45+3'	Report	Isgrove 21' (yellow card) 66'; Potts 40'; Williams 73'; Barnes 87'	Stadium: Pirelli Stadium; Attendance: 3,760; Referee: Jeremy Simpson

4 November 2017 16	Millwall	0–1	Burton Albion	Bermondsey
15:00 GMT	Meredith (yellow card) 45+1'; Wallace (red card) 58'	Report	Sordell 70'; Turner (yellow card) 74'; Bywater (yellow card) 88'	Stadium: The Den; Attendance: 11,507; Referee: Tony Harrington

17 November 2017 17	Burton Albion	1–3	Sheffield United	Burton upon Trent
19:45 GMT	Palmer 31'; Warnock (yellow card) 42'	Report	Sharp 10' (pen.), 34'; Clarke 78'	Stadium: Pirelli Stadium; Attendance: 5,167; Referee: Oliver Langford

21 November 2017 18	Brentford	1–1	Burton Albion	London
19:45 GMT	Jozefzoon 54'; Watkins (yellow card) 82'	Report	Lund (yellow card) 68'; Turner 78'	Stadium: Griffin Park; Attendance: 7,957; Referee: Chris Kavanagh

25 November 2017 19	Burton Albion	0–2	Sunderland	Burton upon Trent
15:00 GMT		Report	Honeyman (yellow card) 49', (goal) 88'; O'Shea (yellow card) 66'; Vaughan 84', (yellow card) 85'	Stadium: Pirelli Stadium; Attendance: 4,808; Referee: Darren England

2 December 2017 20	Derby County	1–0	Burton Albion	Derby
15:00 GMT	Russell 81'	Report	Naylor (yellow card) 14'; Flanagan (yellow card) 65'	Stadium: Pride Park Stadium; Attendance: 26,761; Referee: David Coote

9 December 2017 21	Burton Albion	1–2	Preston North End	Burton upon Trent
15:00 GMT	Turner (yellow card) 47'; Buxton (yellow card) 53'; Brayford (yellow card) 85'; Akins 90+3'	Report	Fisher (yellow card) 21'; Clarke 66'; Horgan 83'; Gallagher (yellow card) 89'	Stadium: Pirelli Stadium; Attendance: 3,659; Referee: Keith Stroud

16 December 2017 22	Bolton Wanderers	0–1	Burton Albion	Horwich
15:00 GMT		Report	Dyer 23'	Stadium: Macron Stadium; Attendance: 13,632; Referee: Andrew Madley

23 December 2017 23	Reading	1–2	Burton Albion	Reading
15:00 GMT	Barrow 76'	Report	Flanagan 40'; Murphy (yellow card) 55'; Naylor 81'	Stadium: Madejski Stadium; Attendance: 21,771; Referee: John Brooks

26 December 2017 24	Burton Albion	1–2	Leeds United	Burton upon Trent
15:00 GMT	Naylor 29'; Naylor (yellow card) 50'; Bywater (yellow card) 60'; Flanagan (yellow card) 63'	Report	Berardi (yellow card) 45+2'; Cooper (yellow card) 58'; Hernández 61'; Roofe 64'	Stadium: Pirelli Stadium; Attendance: 5,612; Referee: Darren Bond

30 December 2017 25	Burton Albion	0–0	Norwich City	Burton upon Trent
15:00 GMT	Murphy (yellow card) 54'	Report	Husband (yellow card) 30'	Stadium: Pirelli Stadium; Attendance: 4,565; Referee: Robert Jones

1 January 2018 26	Sheffield Wednesday	0–3	Burton Albion	Sheffield
15:00 GMT		Report	Flanagan 37'; Dyer 50'; Naylor 89'	Stadium: Hillsborough Stadium; Attendance: 25,506; Referee: Darren England

13 January 2018 27	Burton Albion	1–3	Queens Park Rangers	Burton Upon Trent
15:00 GMT	Dyer 34'; Murphy (yellow card) 53'; McFadzean (yellow card) 56'; Buxton (yellow card) 90+1'	Report	Oteh 32'; Scowen (yellow card) 66'; Lynch (yellow card) 71'; Washington 74'; Luongo 87'	Stadium: Pirelli Stadium; Attendance: 4,264; Referee: Steve Martin

20 January 2018 28	Fulham	6–0	Burton Albion	Fulham
15:00 GMT	Fonte 18', 38'; Piazon 34'; Sessegnon 72', 79'; Kamara 88'	Report		Stadium: Craven Cottage; Attendance: 19,003; Referee: Tim Robinson

30 January 2018 29	Burton Albion	1–3	Reading	Burton upon Trent
19:45 GMT (UTC)	Turner (yellow card) 29'; Buxton (yellow card) 38'; Akins 51' (pen.); McFadzean (yellow card) 86'	Report	Böðvarsson 20', 68' (yellow card) 68'; Moore (yellow card) 27'; Gunter 57'; Ilori (yellow card) 70'	Stadium: Pirelli Stadium; Attendance: 2,750; Referee: Robert Jones

3 February 2018 30	Aston Villa	3–2	Burton Albion	Birmingham
15:00 GMT	Hogan 33'; Adomah 65'; Grealish 88'	Report	Elmohamady 71' (o.g.); Boyce 90+2'	Stadium: Villa Park; Attendance: 33,022; Referee: Robert Lewis

10 February 2018 31	Ipswich Town	0–0	Burton Albion	Ipswich
15:00 GMT		Report	Dyer (yellow card) 25'	Stadium: Portman Road; Attendance: 13,815; Referee: David Webb

17 February 2018 32	Burton Albion	0–0	Nottingham Forest	Burton upon Trent
15:00 GMT	Akins (yellow card) 12'	Report	Lichaj (red card) 28'; Brereton (yellow card) 29'; Colback (yellow card) 90'; Dowell (yellow card) 90+1'	Stadium: Pirelli Stadium; Attendance: 5,775; Referee: Andy Davies

20 February 2018 33	Barnsley	1–2	Burton Albion	Barnsley
19:45 GMT	Williams (yellow card) 55'; Moore 75'	Report	Allen 1', (yellow card) 88'; Davenport 45+4'; MacFadzean (yellow card) 50'; Naylor (yellow card) 62'; Akins (yellow card) 74'	Stadium: Oakwell; Attendance: 11,774; Referee: Tim Robinson

24 February 2018 34	Burton Albion	0–1	Millwall	Burton upon Trent
15:00 GMT	Naylor (yellow card) 71'	Report	Marshall (yellow card) 50', (goal) 61'; Cahill (yellow card) 90+2'	Stadium: Pirelli Stadium; Attendance: 4,105; Referee: Robert Jones

6 March 2018 35	Burton Albion	0–2	Brentford	Burton upon Trent
19:45 GMT	Flanagan (yellow card) 59'	Report	Maupay (yellow card) 33'; McFadzean 60' (o.g.); Watkins 80'	Stadium: Pirelli Stadium; Attendance: 3,464; Referee: Tony Harrington

10 March 2018 36	Burton Albion	0–0	Bristol City	Burton upon Trent
15:00 GMT		Report	Wright (yellow card) 90+2'	Stadium: Pirelli Stadium; Attendance: 4,575; Referee: Oliver Langford

13 March 2018 37	Sheffield United	2–0	Burton Albion	Sheffield
19:45 GMT	Stevens 29'; Evans (yellow card) 57'; Brooks 64'; Stearman (yellow card) 73'	Report	Naylor (yellow card) 72'	Stadium: Bramall Lane; Attendance: 24,832; Referee: Scott Duncan

17 March 2018 38	Wolverhampton Wanderers	3–1	Burton Albion	Wolverhampton
15:00 GMT	Costa 15'; Afobe 41', 56'	Report	Dyer 44'	Stadium: Molineux; Attendance: 29,977; Referee: Geoff Eltringham

30 March 2018 39	Cardiff City	3–1	Burton Albion	Cardiff
15:00 BST	Zohore 16'; Mendez-Laing 45+1'; Paterson 64'	BBC Report	Bent 21'	Stadium: Cardiff City Stadium; Attendance: 21,086; Referee: Simon Hooper (Wiltshire)

2 April 2018 40	Burton Albion	1-1	Middlesbrough	Burton upon Trent
15:00 BST	Sordell 6'	Report	Assombalonga 90'	Stadium: Pirelli Stadium; Attendance: 4468; Referee: David Coote

7 April 2018 41	Birmingham City	1-1	Burton Albion	Birmingham
15:00 BST	Kieftenbeld (yellow card) 56'; Davis (yellow card) 58'; Jutkiewicz 87'	Report	Dyer 48'; Naylor (yellow card) 50'; Bent (yellow card) 60'	Stadium: St Andrew's; Attendance: 22,311; Referee: Darren Bond

10 April 2018 42	Burton Albion	0–5	Hull City	Burton upon Trent
19:45 BST		Report	Wilson 5'; Grosicki 33', 85', (yellow card) 90+2'; Henriksen (yellow card) 48'; Meyler 63' (pen.); Keane 90+3'	Stadium: Pirelli Stadium; Attendance: 3,659; Referee: Peter Bankes

14 April 2018 43	Burton Albion	3–1	Derby County	Burton upon Trent
15:00 BST	Boyce 24'; Buxton (yellow card) 39'; Murphy 44'; Brayford (yellow card) 63'; Akins 68'; Akpan (yellow card) 77'	Report	Nugent 29'; Huddlestone (yellow card) 49'	Stadium: Pirelli Stadium; Attendance: 5,563; Referee: James Linington

21 April 2018 44	Sunderland	1–2	Burton Albion	Sunderland
15:00 BST (UTC+1)	McNair 34', (yellow card) 74'; Wilson (yellow card) 45'; McManaman (yellow card) 59'; Honeyman (yellow card) 90+4'; McGeady (yellow card) 90+7'; Cattermole (yellow card) 90+7'	Report	Davenport (yellow card) 45+2'; Bent 86'; Boyce 90+2', (yellow card) 90+3'	Stadium: Stadium of Light; Attendance: 25,475; Referee: Darren England

28 April 2018 45	Burton Albion	2–0	Bolton Wanderers	Burton upon Trent
15:00	McFadzean (yellow card) 11'; Akpan 28', (yellow card) 79'; Akins 36'	Report	Pratley (yellow card) 33'; Beevers (yellow card) 75'	Stadium: Pirelli Stadium; Attendance: 6,535; Referee: Graham Scott

6 May 2018 46	Preston North End	2–1	Burton Albion	Preston
12:30	Robinson 26'; Bodin (red card) 50'; Huntington (yellow card) 82'; Moult 90+3'	Report	Boyce (yellow card) 48'; Akpan 63'; Akins (yellow card) 80'	Stadium: Deepdale; Attendance: 17,058; Referee: Andy Madley

=== FA Cup ===
In the FA Cup, Burton Albion entered the competition in the third round and were drawn away to Birmingham City.

6 January 2018 Third round	Birmingham City	1–0	Burton Albion	Birmingham
15:00 GMT	Kieftenbeld (yellow card) 37'; Gallagher 56'; Grounds (yellow card) 67'; Davis (yellow card) 90'	Report	Brayford (yellow card) 65'; Turner (yellow card) 75'; Sordell (yellow card) 83'	Stadium: St Andrew's; Attendance: 7,623; Referee: Jeremy Simpson

=== EFL Cup ===
On 16 June 2017, the first round draw took place with a trip to Oldham Athletic confirmed. Another away trip against Cardiff City for the second round. A third away tie in the third round was confirmed against Manchester United.

9 August 2017 First round	Oldham Athletic	2–3	Burton Albion	Oldham
19:45 BST	Green 55'; Davies 67' (pen.)	Report	Varney 47'; Lund 69'; Akins 86' (pen.)	Stadium: Boundary Park; Attendance: 2,176; Referee: Scott Duncan

22 August 2017 Second round	Cardiff City	1–2	Burton Albion	Cardiff
19:45 BST	Coxe (yellow card) 33'; Pilkington 76'	Report	Naylor 26'; Irvine (yellow card) 68'; Fox 70'	Stadium: Cardiff City Stadium; Attendance: 5,820; Referee: John Busby

20 September 2017 Third round	Manchester United	4–1	Burton Albion	Old Trafford
20:00 BST	Rashford 5', 17'; Lingard 36'; Martial 60'	Report	Akpan (yellow card) 42'; Warnock (yellow card) 71'; Dyer 90+1'	Stadium: Old Trafford; Attendance: 54,256; Referee: Graham Scott
