= D'Margio Wright-Phillips =

English footballer (born 2001)

Personal information
- Full name: D'Margio Cameron Wright-Phillips
- Date of birth: 24 September 2001 (age 25)
- Place of birth: Manchester, England
- Position: Right winger

Team information
- Current team: Beerschot
- Number: 32

Youth career
- 2015–2021: Manchester City
- 2020: → Blackburn Rovers (loan)
- 2021–2022: Stoke City

Senior career*
| Years | Team | Apps | (Gls) |
| 2022–2024 | Stoke City | 17 | (2) |
| 2023 | → Northampton Town (loan) | 7 | (0) |
| 2024 | → Beerschot (loan) | 11 | (4) |
| 2024– | Beerschot | 27 | (6) |

International career^{‡}
| 2017 | England U16 | 3 | (0) |
| 2017 | England U17 | 2 | (0) |
| 2025– | Grenada | 2 | (1) |
- * Club domestic league appearances and goals as of 20:17, 31 May 2026 (UTC) ‡ National team caps and goals as of 16:13, 16 November 2025 (UTC)

D'Margio Cameron Wright-Phillips (born 24 September 2001) is a professional footballer who plays as a right winger for Belgian Pro League club Beerschot. Born in England, he plays for the Grenada national team.

== Early and personal life ==
Wright-Phillips was born and raised in Manchester and attended St Bede's College. His father is Shaun Wright-Phillips, who is the adopted son of Ian Wright. His uncle, Bradley Wright-Phillips, is a former professional footballer and the all-time top scorer for the New York Red Bulls. Through his father, Wright-Phillips is of Grenadian and Trinidadian descent.

== Career ==
=== Early career ===
Wright-Phillips began his career with Manchester City. In February 2020 he moved on a loan to Blackburn Rovers until the end of the season, playing for Blackburn's youth team.

=== Stoke City ===
Wright-Phillips signed for Stoke City in February 2021. He scored on his debut for the club's under-23 team. He made his professional debut on 9 January 2022 in a 2–0 FA Cup victory over Leyton Orient, and his Football League debut a week later on 16 January, putting in a man of the match performance in the EFL Championship fixture against Hull City. He scored his first goal for Stoke on 22 January in a 3–2 defeat against Fulham. After breaking into the first-team, Wright-Phillips signed a new two-and-a-half-year contract. He signed an improved contract in July 2022, reflecting his first-team status.

==== Loan to Northampton ====
On 31 January 2023, Wright-Phillips joined League Two side Northampton Town on loan for the remainder of the 2022–23 season. Wright-Phillips made seven substitute appearances for the Cobblers helping them gain automatic promotion to League One.

=== Beerschot ===
On 1 February 2024, Wright-Phillips moved on loan to Beerschot in the Belgian second-tier Challenger Pro League. Wright-Phillips scored four goals in eleven appearances for Beerschot, helping them to win the league and earn promotion to the Belgian Pro League. In May 2024, Stoke City confirmed that he had not been offered a new contract and would depart the club.

On 18 July 2024, Wright-Phillips returned to Beerschot on a permanent deal, signing a multi-year contract. At the end of that season he was deemed surplus to requirements.

== International career ==
In August 2017, Wright-Phillips represented the England under-17 team. He was called up to the Grenada national team for a set of friendlies in October 2025. He scored on his debut with Grenada, a 4–1 win over Cuba on 8 October 2025.

== Career statistics ==
As of 31 May 2026

Appearances and goals by club, season and competition
| Club | Season | League | | | National cup (Note: Includes FA Cup, Belgian Cup) | | League cup (Note: Includes EFL Cup) | | Other | | Total | |
| Club | Season | Division | Apps | Goals | Apps | Goals | Apps | Goals | Apps | Goals | Apps | Goals |
|---|---|---|---|---|---|---|---|---|---|---|---|---|
| Manchester City U21 | 2020–21 | — | | | — | | — | | 1 (Note: Appearance in EFL Trophy) | 0 | 1 | 0 |
| Stoke City | 2021–22 | Championship | 10 | 1 | 2 | 0 | 0 | 0 | — | | 12 | 1 |
| Stoke City | 2022–23 | Championship | 7 | 1 | 0 | 0 | 1 | 0 | — | | 8 | 1 |
| Stoke City | 2023–24 | Championship | 0 | 0 | 0 | 0 | 0 | 0 | — | | 0 | 0 |
| Stoke City | Total | | 17 | 2 | 2 | 0 | 1 | 0 | — | | 20 | 2 |
| Northampton Town (loan) | 2022–23 | League Two | 7 | 0 | 0 | 0 | 0 | 0 | — | | 7 | 0 |
| Beerschot (loan) | 2023–24 | Challenger Pro League | 11 | 4 | 0 | 0 | — | | — | | 11 | 4 |
| Beerschot | 2024–25 | Belgian Pro League | 11 | 0 | 0 | 0 | — | | — | | 11 | 0 |
| Beerschot | 2025–26 | Challenger Pro League | 16 | 6 | 2 | 0 | — | | 4 (Note: Appearances in the playoffs) | 1 | 22 | 7 |
| Beerschot | Total | | 27 | 6 | 2 | 0 | 0 | 0 | 4 | 1 | 33 | 7 |
| Career total | | | 62 | 12 | 4 | 0 | 1 | 0 | 5 | 1 | 72 | 13 |

== Honours ==
Beerschot

- Challenger Pro League: 2023–24
