= 2022–23 Northampton Town F.C. season =

Northampton Town
2022–23 season
- Chairman: Kelvin Thomas
- Manager: Jon Brady
- Stadium: Sixfields Stadium
- League Two: 3rd (Promoted)
- FA Cup: First round
- EFL Cup: First round
- EFL Trophy: Group stage
- Top goalscorer: League: Sam Hoskins (22); All: Sam Hoskins (22)
- Highest home attendance: 7,786 vs Bradford City
- Lowest home attendance: 1,230 vs Cambridge United
- Average home league attendance: 5,920
Home colours	Away colours

The 2022–23 season was Northampton Town's 126th season in their history and the second successive season in League Two. Alongside competing in League Two, the club also participated in the FA Cup, EFL Cup and EFL Trophy. The season covered the period from 1 July 2022 to 30 June 2023.

== Players ==
No.	Name	Position	Nat.	Place of Birth	Date of Birth (Age)	Apps	Goals	Previous club	Date signed	Fee
Goalkeepers
1	Lee Burge	GK	(England)	Hereford	9 January 1993 (aged 30)	39	0	Sunderland	22 June 2022	Free
23	Jonny Maxted	GK	(England)	Tadcaster	26 October 1993 (aged 29)	10	0	Exeter City	24 June 2021	Free
40	Tom King	GK	(Wales)	Plymouth	9 March 1995 (aged 28)	8	0	Salford City	14 January 2023	Free
Defenders
2	Tyler Magloire	CB	(England)	Bradford	21 December 1998 (aged 24)	29	2	Blackburn Rovers	28 July 2022	Undisclosed
3	Aaron McGowan (vc)	RB	(England)	Liverpool	24 July 1996 (aged 26)	63	2	Kilmarnock	12 July 2021	Undisclosed
5	Jon Guthrie (c)	CB	(England)	Devizes	29 July 1992 (aged 30)	93	10	Livingston	24 June 2021	Free
6	Sam Sherring	CB	(England)	Dorchester	8 May 2000 (aged 23)	37	2	AFC Bournemouth	5 July 2022	Compensation
13	David Norman Jr.	CB	(Canada)	New Westminster	31 May 1998 (aged 24)	6	1	Cavalry	25 March 2023	Free
14	Ali Koiki	LB	(England)	Kensington	22 August 1999 (aged 23)	74	1	Bristol Rovers	23 July 2021	Free
20	Harvey Lintott	RB	(England)	Gillingham	20 February 2003 (aged 20)	38	1	Gillingham	11 July 2022	Free
22	Akin Odimayo	RB	(England)	Camden	28 November 1999 (aged 23)	22	0	Swindon Town	2 July 2022	Compensation
24	Ryan Haynes	LB	(England)	Northampton	27 September 1995 (aged 27)	33	1	Newport County	20 June 2022	Free
25	Josh Tomlinson	CB	(England)	Kettering	1 December 2005 (aged 17)	4	1	Academy	7 December 2022	N/A
26	Paul Osew	LB	(England)	Wandsworth	25 November 2000 (aged 22)	4	0	AFC Wimbledon	11 March 2023	Free
35	Max Dyche	CB	(England)	Northampton	23 February 2003 (aged 20)	26	1	Academy	12 December 2020	N/A
Midfielders
4	Jack Sowerby	CM	(England)	Preston	23 March 1995 (aged 28)	108	2	Fleetwood Town	18 September 2020	Undisclosed
7	Sam Hoskins	W	(England)	Dorchester	4 February 1993 (aged 30)	338	75	Yeovil Town	1 August 2015	Free
8	Ben Fox	CM	(England)	Burton upon Trent	1 February 1998 (aged 25)	27	4	Grimsby Town	17 June 2022	Free
11	Mitch Pinnock	W	(England)	Gravesend	12 December 1994 (aged 28)	101	15	Kilmarnock	8 June 2021	Free
12	Marc Leonard	CM	(Scotland)	Glasgow	19 December 2001 (aged 21)	48	1	Brighton & Hove Albion	25 July 2022	Loan
15	Will Hondermarck	CM	(Republic of Ireland)	Orléans (FRA)	21 November 2000 (aged 22)	17	1	Barnsley	26 January 2023	Undisclosed
16	D'Margio Wright-Phillips	W	(England)	Manchester	24 September 2001 (aged 21)	7	0	Stoke City	31 January 2023	Loan
17	Shaun McWilliams	CM	(England)	Northampton	14 August 1998 (aged 24)	190	4	Academy	30 April 2016	N/A
18	Josh Harrop	AM	(England)	Stockport	15 December 1995 (aged 27)	2	0	Preston North End	12 December 2022	Free
27	Peter Abimbola	CM	(England)	Northampton	22 February 2004 (aged 19)	6	0	Academy	30 August 2021	N/A
28	Miguel Ngwa	W	(England)	Northampton	4 June 2004 (aged 18)	3	0	Academy	30 August 2021	N/A
34	Liam Cross	W	(England)	Northampton	8 April 2003 (aged 20)	9	0	Academy	30 October 2019	N/A
Forwards
9	Louis Appéré	CF	(Scotland)	Perth	26 March 1999 (aged 24)	65	12	Dundee United	31 January 2022	Undisclosed
10	Danny Hylton	CF	(England)	Camden	25 February 1989 (aged 34)	28	0	Luton Town	21 June 2022	Free
19	Kieron Bowie	CF	(Scotland)	Kirkcaldy	21 September 2002 (aged 20)	40	5	Fulham	12 July 2022	Loan
21	Josh Eppiah	CF	(Belgium)	Brussels	11 October 1998 (aged 24)	35	2	Leicester City	19 August 2022	Loan
29	Tete Yengi	CF	(Australia)	Adelaide	28 November 2000 (aged 22)	16	0	Ipswich Town	31 January 2023	Loan
30	Jack Connor	CF	(England)	Northampton	30 September 2003 (aged 19)	2	0	Academy	1 November 2021	N/A

== Pre-season ==
On 3 June, the Cobblers announced that an XI side will face AFC Rushden & Diamonds during pre-season. Three days later, a home friendly against West Bromwich Albion was confirmed. A second home friendly was later added to the calendar, against Luton Town. On June 16, Northampton announced they would travel to Cheltenham Town during pre-season. A pre-season friendly whilst in Scotland was confirmed against St Mirren.

2 July 2022 Practice Match	Nottingham Forest U23	1–2	Northampton Town	Loughborough
12:00 BST		Report	L.Cross; S.Hoskins (pen.)	Stadium: University of Loughborough; Attendance: Behind Closed Doors

5 July 2022 Friendly	St Mirren	1–3	Northampton Town	Paisley, Scotland
19:00 BST	M.O'Hara 14'	Report	L.Appéré 21'; D.Hylton 77', 84' (pen.)	Stadium: St Mirren Park; Attendance: 2,211

8 July 2022 Practice Match	Dundee United	1–1	Northampton Town	St Andrews, Scotland
11:00 BST	I.Niskanen 33'	Report	A.Koiki 46'	Stadium: University Park; Attendance: Behind Closed Doors

13 July 2022 Friendly	Northampton Town	0–3	West Bromwich Albion	Northampton
19:45 BST		Report	D.Dike 51'; K.Grant 72'; A.Reach 88'	Stadium: Sixfields Stadium; Attendance: 1,907; Referee: Dean Whitestone

16 July 2022 Friendly	Northampton Town	1–2	Luton Town	Northampton
13:00 BST	M.Pinnock 7'	Report	E.Adebayo 54'; D.Potts 56'	Stadium: Sixfields Stadium; Attendance: 2,386; Referee: Andy Woolmer

23 July 2022 Friendly	Cheltenham Town	2–0	Northampton Town	Cheltenham
15:00 BST	A.May 34'; D.Nlundulu 43'	Report		Stadium: Whaddon Road; Attendance: 781 (105); Referee: Andy Woolmer

== Competitions ==
=== EFL League Two ===
==== League table ====
Pos	Team	Pld	W	D	L	GF	GA	GD	Pts	Promotion, qualification or relegation
1	Leyton Orient (C, P)	46	26	13	7	61	34	+27	91	Promotion to EFL League One
2	Stevenage (P)	46	24	13	9	61	39	+22	85	Promotion to EFL League One
3	Northampton Town (P)	46	23	14	9	62	42	+20	83	Promotion to EFL League One
4	Stockport County	46	22	13	11	65	37	+28	79	Qualification for League Two play-offs
5	Carlisle United (O, P)	46	20	16	10	66	43	+23	76	Qualification for League Two play-offs
6	Bradford City	46	20	16	10	61	43	+18	76	Qualification for League Two play-offs

Source: EFL Official Website
Rules for classification: 1) Points; 2) Goal difference; 3) Number of goals scored; 4) Head-to-head results; 5) Wins; 6) Away goals; 7) Penalty points (sec 9.5); 8) 12-point sending off offences
(C) Champions; (O) Play-off winners; (P) Promoted

==== Results summary ====
Overall								Home						Away					
Pld	W	D	L	GF	GA	GD	Pts	W	D	L	GF	GA	GD	W	D	L	GF	GA	GD
46	23	14	9	62	42	+20	83	12	6	5	31	20	+11	11	8	4	31	22	+9

Last updated: 8 May 2023.

==== League position by match ====
Round	1	2	3	4	5	6	7	8	9	10	11	12	13	14	15	16	17	18	19	20	21	22	23	24	25	26	27	28	29	30	31	32	33	34	35	36	37	38	39	40	41	42	43	44	45	46
Ground	H	A	H	A	A	H	H	A	H	H	A	A	H	A	A	H	H	A	A	H	H	A	H	H	A	A	A	H	A	H	H	A	A	H	A	H	H	A	H	A	H	A	A	H	H	A
Result	W	D	W	W	D	L	W	W	W	W	W	L	L	D	W	D	D	W	W	D	W	D	L	W	L	L	W	D	D	D	L	W	D	W	D	W	W	W	D	L	W	D	W	W	L	W
Position	7	8	4	3	4	6	5	5	3	2	2	3	3	3	3	3	3	3	3	3	3	3	3	3	3	3	3	4	4	4	4	4	4	4	4	4	3	2	2	2	2	2	2	2	3	3

Updated to match(es) played on 8 May 2023. Source:
A = Away; H = Home; W = Win; D = Draw; L = Loss

==== Matches ====
Win Draw Loss Postponed

The 2022/23 league fixtures were announced on June 23.

30 July 2022 1	Northampton Town	3–2	Colchester United	Northampton
15:00 BST	S.Hoskins 27', 74' (pen.); S.McWilliams (yellow card) 55'; R.Haynes 89'	Report	F.Sears 42' (pen.); L.Hannant (yellow card) 72'; C.Coxe (yellow card) 73'; F.Nouble (yellow card) 76'; N.Chilvers 79' (yellow card) 83'	Stadium: Sixfields Stadium; Attendance: 5,463 (494); Referee: Martin Woods

6 August 2022 2	Grimsby Town	1–1	Northampton Town	Cleethorpes
15:00 BST	J.Maguire-Drew 88'	Report	S.Hoskins 74'; R.Haynes (yellow card) 90+1'	Stadium: Blundell Park; Attendance: 7,154 (495); Referee: Thomas Parsons

13 August 2022 3	Northampton Town	2–1	Hartlepool United	Northampton
15:00 BST	T.Magloire 31'; M.Pinnock (yellow card) 39'; L.Appéré 57'; S.Hoskins (yellow card) 58'; R.Haynes (yellow card) 90+3'	Report	J.Umerah 45+4'; R.Menayese (yellow card) 52'; A.Lacey (yellow card) 58'; T.Crawford (yellow card) 76'	Stadium: Sixfields Stadium; Attendance: 4,828 (205); Referee: Sunny Gill

16 August 2022 4	Crawley Town	2–3	Northampton Town	Crawley
19:45 BST	J.Balagizi 4', 61'	Report	S.Hoskins 13', 23'; K.Bowie 90+2'; D.Hylton (yellow card) 90+6'	Stadium: Broadfield Stadium; Attendance: 2,471 (355); Referee: Stephen Martin

20 August 2022 5	Crewe Alexandra	2–2	Northampton Town	Crewe
15:00 BST	C.Baker-Richardson 26', 41'; K.Mellor (yellow card) 63'; D.Agyei (yellow card) 90+5'	Report	S.Hoskins (yellow card) 42' (goal) 43', 90+7'; S.McWilliams (yellow card) 83'; L.Burge (yellow card) 90+5'	Stadium: Gresty Road; Attendance: 4,071 (Away attendance not confirmed); Referee: David Webb

27 August 2022 6	Northampton Town	0–1	Doncaster Rovers	Northampton
15:00 BST	S.Hoskins (yellow card) 20'; S.McWilliams (yellow card) 56'	Report	G.Miller 69' (pen.); J.Mitchell (yellow card) 90+3'	Stadium: Sixfields Stadium; Attendance: 5,515 (731); Referee: Neil Hair

3 September 2022 7	Northampton Town	3–1	Barrow	Northampton
15:00 BST	S.Hoskins 5'; K.Bowie 46'; T.Magloire 50' (yellow card) 90+8'; M.Leonard (yellow card) 54'; A.Koiki (yellow card) 90+6'; J.Guthrie (yellow card) 90+9'	Report	J.Gordon 13' (yellow card) 45'; S.Foley (yellow card) 26'; T.White (yellow card) 86'; P.Brough (yellow card) 90+8'	Stadium: Sixfields Stadium; Attendance: 4,605 (223); Referee: Chris Pollard

13 September 2022 8	AFC Wimbledon	0–2	Northampton Town	Wimbledon, London
19:45 BST	P.Maghoma (yellow card) 65'; A.Assal (yellow card) 84'; A.Pearce (yellow card) 90+2'	Report	J.Guthrie 27'; J.Sowerby (yellow card) 43'; R.Towler 69' (o.g.)	Stadium: Plough Lane; Attendance: 6,618 (607); Referee: Charles Breakspear

17 September 2022 9	Northampton Town	3–0	Rochdale	Northampton
15:00 BST	J.Guthrie 42'; S.Hoskins 73', 81'	Report	J.Ball (yellow card) 57'; T.Diagouraga (yellow card) 60'; S.Graham (yellow card) 90+1'	Stadium: Sixfields Stadium; Attendance: 4,691 (196); Referee: Sam Purkiss

24 September 2022 10	Northampton Town	2–1	Stockport County	Northampton
14:00 BST	J.Guthrie (yellow card) 39'; S.Hoskins 48'; H.Lintott 63'; D.Hylton (yellow card) 65'	Report	F.Horsfall 12'; A.Wright (yellow card) 34' (yellow-red card) 90+4'; A.Sarcevic (yellow card) 40'; K.Wootton (yellow card) 80'	Stadium: Sixfields Stadium; Attendance: 5,632 (619); Referee: Darren Handley

1 October 2022 11	Swindon Town	1–2	Northampton Town	Swindon
15:00 BST	L.Reed (yellow card) 57'; J.Williams 61'; F.Blake-Tracy (yellow card) 67'	Report	J.Guthrie (yellow card) 62'; S.Sherring (yellow card) 62'; B.Fox 68'; M.Pinnock 88'	Stadium: County Ground; Attendance: 9,789 (614); Referee: Alan Young

4 October 2022 12	Walsall	1–0	Northampton Town	Walsall
19:45 BST	D.Johnson 37'; I.Hutchinson (yellow card) 44'; H.White (yellow card) 63'; D.James-Taylor (yellow card) 65'; O.Evans (yellow card) 90'	Report	D.Hylton (yellow card) 21'; J.Guthrie (yellow card) 45'	Stadium: Bescot Stadium; Attendance: 4,845 (740); Referee: Sam Barrott

8 October 2022 13	Northampton Town	0–1	Salford City	Northampton
15:00 BST	M.Pinnock (yellow card) 53'; B.Fox (yellow card) 87'	Report	E.Galbraith 45+1'	Stadium: Sixfields Stadium; Attendance: 5,577 (107); Referee: Lee Swabey

15 October 2022 14	Leyton Orient	0–0	Northampton Town	Leyton, London
15:00 BST		Report	M.Leonard (yellow card) 40'; B.Fox (red card) 48'; M.Pinnock (yellow card) 70'; A.Odimayo (yellow card) 90+2'	Stadium: Brisbane Road; Attendance: 8,716 (1,250); Referee: Ollie Yates

22 October 2022 15	Stevenage	2–3	Northampton Town	Stevenage
15:00 BST	T.Vancooten (yellow card) 1'; D.Rose 35'; A.Gilbey 85'	Report	L.Appéré 1' (pen.); A.Koiki (yellow card) 45+2'; K.Bowie (yellow card) 56' (goal) 82'; S.McWilliams 87'; D.Hylton (red card) 90+3'; L.Burge (yellow card) 90+5'	Stadium: Broadhall Way; Attendance: 4,941 (959); Referee: Geoff Eltringham

25 October 2022 16	Northampton Town	2–2	Sutton United	Northampton
19:45 BST	M.Leonard 15'; M.Pinnock 37'; S.Hoskins (yellow card) 73'	Report	R.Milsom (yellow card) 24'; S.Hart (yellow card) 39'; O.Bugiel 47'; D.Wilson 61'	Stadium: Sixfields Stadium; Attendance: 4,800 (159); Referee: Ross Joyce

29 October 2022 17	Northampton Town	1–1	Newport County	Northampton
14:00 BST	M.Leonard (yellow card) 38'; R.Haynes (yellow card) 86'; S.Hoskins 90+3'	Report	O.Bogle 2'	Stadium: Sixfields Stadium; Attendance: 5,102 (231); Referee: Thomas Kirk

12 November 2022 18	Gillingham	0–2	Northampton Town	Gillingham
15:00 GMT		Report	S.Hoskins 27' (yellow card) 90+2'; A.McGowan (yellow card) 58'; K.Bowie 72'	Stadium: Priestfield Stadium; Attendance: 4,509 (429); Referee: Declan Bourne

19 November 2022 19	Bradford City	1–3	Northampton Town	Bradford
15:00 GMT	M.Platt (yellow card) 57'; A.Cook 90+2' (pen.)	Report	M.Pinnock 29'; S.McWilliams 31' (yellow card) 60'; S.Sherring 59'	Stadium: Valley Parade; Attendance: 18,656 (539); Referee: Anthony Backhouse

3 December 2022 20	Northampton Town	0–0	Tranmere Rovers	Northampton
15:00 GMT	S.McWilliams (yellow card) 51'	Report	E.Bristow (yellow card) 25'; K.Hemmings (yellow card) 70'; R.Doohan (yellow card) 79'	Stadium: Sixfields Stadium; Attendance: 5,601 (363); Referee: Will Finnie

20 December 2022 21	Northampton Town	2–1	Carlisle United	Northampton
19:45 GMT	B.Fox (yellow card) 45'; S.Sherring 53'; L.Appéré 56'; L.Burge (yellow card) 83'; A.McGowan (yellow card) 88'	Report	C.Whelan (yellow card) 41'; J.Armer 50' (yellow card) 82'	Stadium: Sixfields Stadium; Attendance: 4,583 (225); Referee: James Oldham

26 December 2022 22	Mansfield Town	1–1	Northampton Town	Mansfield
15:00 GMT	R.Harbottle (yellow card) 7'; O.Hawkins (yellow card) 9'; W.Swan 84'; J.Perch (yellow card) 90+3'	Report	A.Odimayo (yellow card) 57'; S.Hoskins 88'	Stadium: Field Mill; Attendance: 7,301 (589); Referee: Benjamin Speedie

29 December 2022 23	Northampton Town	1–2	Swindon Town	Northampton
19:45 GMT	K.Bowie (yellow card) 82'; S.Hoskins (yellow card) 89' (goal) 90'	Report	T.Shade 26' (yellow card) 80'; E.Iandolo (yellow card) 45+2'; M.Lavinier 56'; R.Hepburn-Murphy (yellow card) 90+7'	Stadium: Sixfields Stadium; Attendance: 7,156 (1,455); Referee: Lewis Smith

2 January 2023 24	Northampton Town	1–0	Leyton Orient	Northampton
15:00 GMT	B.Fox 51' (yellow card) 59'; K.Bowie (yellow card) 82'; D.Hylton (yellow card) 90+3'	Report	T.Archibald (yellow card) 64'; I.El Mizouni (yellow card) 83'; O.Beckles (yellow card) 90+2' (red card) 90+4'	Stadium: Sixfields Stadium; Attendance: 7,475 (1,272); Referee: Chris Pollard

7 January 2023 25	Salford City	2–1	Northampton Town	Salford
12:30 GMT	E.Galbraith 9' (yellow card) 56'; C.McAleny 33'	Report	S.Hoskins 22'; M.Pinnock (yellow card) 60'	Stadium: Moor Lane; Attendance: 2,753 (529); Referee: Robert Lewis
Note: Live on Sky Sports

14 January 2023 26	Stockport County	2–0	Northampton Town	Stockport
15:00 GMT	W.Collar (yellow card) 24'; A.Sarcevic 33'; J.Sowerby 68' (o.g.)	Report	M.Pinnock (yellow card) 36'	Stadium: Edgeley Park; Attendance: 8,732 (932); Referee: Rebecca Welch

28 January 2023 27	Barrow	0–2	Northampton Town	Barrow-in-Furness
15:00 GMT	S.Foley (yellow card) 90+7'	Report	M.Leonard (yellow card) 34'; B.Fox 54'; S.McWilliams 85'; T.Magloire (yellow card) 89'	Stadium: Holker Street; Attendance: 3,002 (223); Referee: Darren Drysdale

5 February 2023 28	Northampton Town	0–0	Walsall	Northampton
15:00 GMT	S.McWilliams (yellow card) 40'; A.Koiki (yellow card) 72' (yellow-red card) 90+5'	Report	D.Daniels (yellow card) 45'; B.Comley (yellow card) 61'; C.Wilkinson (yellow card) 90+4'	Stadium: Sixfields Stadium; Attendance: 6,500 (1,039); Referee: Bobby Madden

11 February 2023 29	Rochdale	1–1	Northampton Town	Rochdale
15:00 GMT	I.Henderson 52'; T.Diagouraga (yellow card) 62'; D.Lloyd (yellow card) 80'; S.Quigley (yellow card) 88'	Report	B.Fox 89'	Stadium: Spotland Stadium; Attendance: 2,742 (432); Referee: Neil Hair

14 February 2023 30	Northampton Town	0–0	AFC Wimbledon	Northampton
19:45 GMT	J.Guthrie (yellow card) 90+3'	Report	A.Woodyard (yellow card) 65'; C.Gunter (yellow card) 76'; A.Little (yellow card) 88'; P.Kalambayi (yellow card) 90+5'	Stadium: Sixfields Stadium; Attendance: 5,041 (383); Referee: Carl Brook

18 February 2023 31	Northampton Town	1–2	Grimsby Town	Northampton
15:00 GMT	S.Hoskins 18'	Report	D.Amos (yellow card) 15'; J.Emmanuel (yellow card) 36'; L.Waterfall 74'; A.Glennon 90+1'	Stadium: Sixfields Stadium; Attendance: 6,694 (895); Referee: Seb Stockbridge

25 February 2023 32	Colchester United	0–1	Northampton Town	Colchester
15:00 GMT	F.Kelleher (yellow card) 20'; A.Read (yellow card) 81'; S.Tovide (yellow card) 84'	Report	M.Leonard (yellow card) 30'; T.Magloire (yellow card) 35'; A.McGowan (yellow card) 38'; L.Appéré 41'; S.Hoskins (yellow card) 73'; T.King (yellow card) 90+3'	Stadium: Colchester Community Stadium; Attendance: 3,730 (655); Referee: Sunny Gill

28 February 2023 33	Harrogate Town	1–1	Northampton Town	Harrogate
19:45 GMT	L.Armstrong 50'; K.Olaigbe (yellow card) 62'	Report	M.Pinnock 49'; T.Yengi (yellow card) 80'	Stadium: Wetherby Road; Attendance: 2,120 (Away attendance not confirmed); Referee: Thomas Parsons

4 March 2023 34	Northampton Town	1–0	Crawley Town	Northampton
15:00 GMT	S.Hoskins (yellow card) 70'; A.McGowan (red card) 72'; J.Guthrie (yellow card) 74'; J.Sowerby 79'; H.Lintott (yellow card) 90+6'	Report	B.Mason (yellow card) 23'; J.Lynch (yellow card) 39'; C.Addai (yellow card) 45+3'; A.Oteh (yellow card) 60'; K.Gordon (yellow card) 71'	Stadium: Sixfields Stadium; Attendance: 5,450 (158); Referee: Ross Joyce

11 March 2023 35	Hartlepool United	1–1	Northampton Town	Hartlepool
15:00 GMT	J.Umerah 37'; E.Murray (yellow card) 59'	Report	S.Hoskins 81'	Stadium: Victoria Park; Attendance: 5,021 (363); Referee: Thomas Kirk

14 March 2023 36	Northampton Town	1–0	Mansfield Town	Northampton
19:45 GMT	S.Hoskins 28' (pen.); R.Haynes (yellow card) 66'	Report	K.Wallace (yellow card) 4'; C.Pym (yellow card) 27'; S.Quinn (red card) 66'; J.Law (yellow card) 88'	Stadium: Sixfields Stadium; Attendance: 6,301 (1,039); Referee: Geoff Eltringham

18 March 2023 37	Northampton Town	1–0	Crewe Alexandra	Northampton
15:00 GMT	L.Appéré 23'; W.Hondermarck (yellow card) 89'	Report		Stadium: Sixfields Stadium; Attendance: 5,673 (248); Referee: Andrew Kitchen

25 March 2023 38	Doncaster Rovers	0–2	Northampton Town	Doncaster
15:00 GMT	T.Anderson (yellow card) 38'; T.Miller (yellow card) 72'	Report	M.Pinnock 2'; S.Hoskins 52'; J.Sowerby (yellow card) 72'; M.Leonard (yellow card) 76'; K.Bowie (yellow card) 80'	Stadium: Eco-Power Stadium; Attendance: 6,469 (911); Referee: Adam Herczeg

1 April 2023 39	Northampton Town	1–1	Stevenage	Northampton
15:00 BST	L.Appéré 6'; J.Guthrie (yellow card) 59'; M.Pinnock (yellow card) 75'; W.Hondermarck (yellow card) 83'; A.Odimayo (yellow card) 90'; T.Yengi (yellow card) 90+3'	Report	J.McCracken (yellow card) 13'; D.Campbell (yellow card) 19'; J.Reid 72'; D.Rose (yellow card) 86'	Stadium: Sixfields Stadium; Attendance: 7,759 (956); Referee: Simon Mather

7 April 2023 40	Newport County	3–0	Northampton Town	Newport, Wales
15:00 BST	O.Bogle 43', 90+1' (pen.); A.Lewis (yellow card) 55'; W.Evans (yellow card) 57'; M.Baker (yellow card) 69'; C.McNeill 90+6'	Report	K.Bowie (yellow card) 55'; L.Burge (yellow card) 90+1'; D.Hylton (yellow card) 90+5'	Stadium: Rodney Parade; Attendance: 4,982 (666); Referee: Leigh Doughty

10 April 2023 41	Northampton Town	2–1	Gillingham	Northampton
15:00 BST	L.Appéré 32'; D.Norman Jr. (yellow card) 71'; W.Hondermarck 82'	Report	A.O'Brien 63'; E.Coleman (yellow card) 90+1'	Stadium: Sixfields Stadium; Attendance: 6,904 (847); Referee: Darren Drysdale

15 April 2023 42	Carlisle United	0–0	Northampton Town	Carlisle
15:00 BST	J.Mellish (yellow card) 85'	Report	L.Appéré (yellow card) 56'; M.Pinnock (yellow card) 85'; W.Hondermarck (yellow card) 90'	Stadium: Brunton Park; Attendance: 8,282 (589); Referee: Rebecca Welch

18 April 2023 43	Sutton United	1–2	Northampton Town	Sutton, London
19:45 BST	W.Randall (yellow card) 26'; D.Wilson 45+3'; C.Rowe (yellow card) 50'; O.Bugiel (yellow card) 84'	Report	L.Appéré 32'; M.Pinnock 50'; M.Leonard (yellow card) 87'; D.Hylton (yellow card) 90+3'	Stadium: Gander Green Lane; Attendance: 2,760 (625); Referee: David Rock

22 April 2023 44	Northampton Town	3–1	Harrogate Town	Northampton
15:00 BST	D.Norman Jr. 10'; W.Hondermarck (yellow card) 20'; S.Hoskins 23'; K.Bowie 45+2'; S.McWilliams (yellow card) 57'	Report	K.Olaigbe 3'	Stadium: Sixfields Stadium; Attendance: 7,018 (107); Referee: Seb Stockbridge

29 April 2023 45	Northampton Town	1–2	Bradford City	Northampton
15:00 BST	M.Dyche 64' (yellow card) 90+4'; S.McWilliams (yellow card) 72'	Report	A.Cook 30'; D.Costelloe (yellow card) 75'; R.Crichlow 90+4'	Stadium: Sixfields Stadium; Attendance: 7,786 (948); Referee: Marc Edwards

8 May 2023 46	Tranmere Rovers	0–1	Northampton Town	Birkenhead
12:30 BST	T.Davies (yellow card) 71'	Report	S.Hoskins 5'; D.Hylton (yellow card) 90+6'	Stadium: Prenton Park; Attendance: 8,225 (2,200); Referee: Craig Hicks
Note: Live on Sky Sports

=== FA Cup ===
Northampton were drawn away to Chesterfield in the first round.

5 November 2022 First round	Chesterfield	1–0	Northampton Town	Chesterfield
15:00 GMT	A.Dobra 14' (yellow card) 56'; T.Williams (yellow card) 38'; T.Akinola (yellow card) 80'	Report		Stadium: Technique Stadium; Attendance: 5,886 (754); Referee: Adam Herczeg

=== EFL Cup ===
Northampton Town were drawn at home to Wycombe Wanderers in the first round.

9 August 2022 First round	Northampton Town	1–2	Wycombe Wanderers	Northampton
19:45 BST	L.Appéré 76' (pen.)	Report	J.Jacobson 28'; D.Mellor 34'; J.Pattenden (yellow card) 54'	Stadium: Sixfields Stadium; Attendance: 2,711 (471); Referee: Tom Nield

=== EFL Trophy ===
On 20 June, the initial Group stage draw was made, grouping Northmpton Town with Ipswich Town and Cambridge United. Three days later, Arsenal U21s joined Southern Group H.

Pos	Div	Team	Pld	W	PW	PL	L	GF	GA	GD	Pts	Qualification
1	L1	Ipswich Town	3	2	0	0	1	8	1	+7	6	Advance to Round 2
2	ACA	Arsenal U21	3	2	0	0	1	5	3	+2	6	Advance to Round 2
3	L1	Cambridge United	3	2	0	0	1	3	2	+1	6	
4	L2	Northampton Town	3	0	0	0	3	1	11	−10	0	

Source: EFL.com

30 August 2022 Group stage	Ipswich Town	6–0	Northampton Town	Ipswich
19:45 BST	M.Harness 11', 16'; G.Leigh 26'; D.Ball (yellow card) 44'; C.Burgess 58'; G.Edmundson 83'; F.Ladapo 90+1'	Report		Stadium: Portman Road; Attendance: 5,342 (260); Referee: Tom Reeves

20 September 2022 Group stage	Northampton Town	0–2	Cambridge United	Northampton
19:00 BST	B.Smith-Howes (yellow card) 89'	Report	F.Okenabirhie 68', 77'	Stadium: Sixfields Stadium; Attendance: 1,230 (69); Referee: Craig Hicks

18 October 2022 Group stage	Northampton Town	1–3	Arsenal U21	Northampton
19:00 BST	J.Tomlinson 8'; B.Fox (yellow card) 36'	Report	B.Ibrahim (yellow card) 35'; Z.Awe 56'; A.Cozier-Duberry 74'; J.Henry-Francis (yellow card) 79'; N.Butler-Oyedeji 90+5'	Stadium: Sixfields Stadium; Attendance: 3,037 (308); Referee: Carl Brook

=== Appearances, goals and cards ===
No.	Pos	Player	League Two			FA Cup			EFL Cup			EFL Trophy			Total			Discipline	
No.	Pos	Player	Starts	Sub	Goals	Starts	Sub	Goals	Starts	Sub	Goals	Starts	Sub	Goals	Starts	Sub	Goals	Yellow card	Red card
1	GK	Lee Burge	38	–	–	1	–	–	–	–	–	–	–	–	39	–	–	4	–
2	CB	Tyler Magloire	14	4	2	–	–	–	1	–	–	–	–	–	15	4	2	3	–
3	RB	Aaron McGowan	14	3	–	1	–	–	–	–	–	1	–	–	16	3	–	3	1
4	CM	Jack Sowerby	31	7	1	1	–	–	–	–	–	–	–	–	32	7	1	2	–
5	CB	Jon Guthrie	41	–	2	1	–	–	1	–	–	–	–	–	43	–	2	7	–
6	CB	Sam Sherring	36	–	2	1	–	–	–	–	–	–	–	–	37	–	2	1	–
7	W	Sam Hoskins	40	1	22	1	–	–	–	–	–	–	–	–	41	1	22	8	–
8	CM	Ben Fox	15	7	4	1	–	–	1	–	–	3	–	–	20	7	4	3	1
9	ST	Louis Appéré	37	6	8	–	–	–	1	–	1	1	–	–	39	6	9	1	–
10	ST	Danny Hylton	6	19	–	–	–	–	–	1	–	1	–	–	7	19	–	7	1
11	W	Mitch Pinnock	41	4	6	1	–	–	–	1	–	1	–	–	43	5	6	7	–
12	CM	Marc Leonard	37	8	1	1	–	–	1	–	–	–	1	–	39	9	1	7	–
13	CB	David Norman Jr.	4	2	1	–	–	–	–	–	–	–	–	–	4	2	1	1	–
14	LB	Ali Koiki	21	1	–	–	–	–	1	–	–	–	1	–	22	2	–	2	1
15	CM	Will Hondermarck	9	8	1	–	–	–	–	–	–	–	–	–	9	8	1	4	–
16	W	D'Margio Wright-Phillips	–	7	–	–	–	–	–	–	–	–	–	–	–	7	–	–	–
17	CM	Shaun McWilliams	24	6	3	–	1	–	–	1	–	1	–	–	25	8	3	8	–
18	AM	Josh Harrop	–	2	–	–	–	–	–	–	–	–	–	–	–	2	–	–	–
19	ST	Kieron Bowie	28	9	5	1	–	–	1	–	–	1	–	–	31	9	5	5	–
20	RB	Harvey Lintott	23	10	1	–	1	–	1	–	–	2	1	–	26	12	1	1	–
21	ST	Josh Eppiah	5	13	–	–	–	–	–	–	–	1	–	–	6	13	–	–	–
22	CB	Akin Odimayo	13	6	–	–	1	–	–	–	–	2	–	–	15	7	–	3	–
23	GK	Jonny Maxted	–	1	–	–	–	–	1	–	–	3	–	–	4	1	–	–	–
24	LB	Ryan Haynes	15	13	1	1	–	–	1	–	–	3	–	–	20	13	1	4	–
25	CB	Josh Tomlinson	–	–	–	–	–	–	–	–	–	2	1	1	2	1	1	–	–
26	LB	Paul Osew	–	4	–	–	–	–	–	–	–	–	–	–	–	4	–	–	–
27	CM	Peter Abimbola	–	1	–	–	–	–	–	–	–	2	1	–	2	2	–	–	–
28	W	Miguel Ngwa	–	–	–	–	–	–	–	–	–	2	–	–	2	–	–	–	–
29	ST	Tete Yengi	1	15	–	–	–	–	–	–	–	–	–	–	1	15	–	2	–
30	ST	Jack Connor	–	–	–	–	–	–	–	–	–	2	–	–	2	–	–	–	–
34	W	Liam Cross	–	3	–	–	–	–	1	–	–	2	1	–	3	4	–	–	–
35	CB	Max Dyche	5	13	1	–	1	–	–	–	–	3	–	–	8	14	1	1	–
40	GK	Tom King	8	–	–	–	–	–	–	–	–	–	–	–	8	–	–	1	–
Youth team scholars:
31	CM	Dylan Hill	–	–	–	–	–	–	–	–	–	–	2	–	–	2	–	–	–
32	W	Kai O'Keeffe	–	–	–	–	–	–	–	–	–	–	1	–	–	1	–	–	–
33	RB	Brad Smith-Howes	–	–	–	–	–	–	–	–	–	–	1	–	–	1	–	–	–
37	LB	Ayo Lekuti	–	–	–	–	–	–	–	–	–	–	2	–	–	2	–	–	–
38	CM	Reuben Wyatt	–	–	–	–	–	–	–	–	–	–	2	–	–	2	–	–	–
39	W	Rico Duggan	–	–	–	–	–	–	–	–	–	–	1	–	–	1	–	–	–

=== Clean sheets ===
Includes all competitive matches.

As of match played 29 April 2023

No.	Nat.	Player	Matches Played	Clean Sheet %	League Two	FA Cup	EFL Cup	EFL Trophy	TOTAL
1	(England)	Lee Burge	39	31%	12	0	0	0	12
23	(England)	Jonny Maxted	4(+1)	0%	0	0	0	0	0
40	(Wales)	Tom King	8	50%	4	0	0	0	4
Totals			50	32%	16	0	0	0	16

=== Scores overview ===
Northampton Town' score given first.

Win Draw Loss

Opposition	Home score	Away score	Double
AFC Wimbledon	0 – 0	2 – 0	No
Barrow	3 – 1	2 – 0	Yes
Bradford City	1 – 2	3 – 1	No
Carlisle United	2 – 1	0 – 0	No
Colchester United	3 – 2	1 – 0	Yes
Crawley Town	1 – 0	3 – 2	Yes
Crewe Alexandra	1 – 0	2 – 2	No
Doncaster Rovers	0 – 1	2 – 0	No
Gillingham	2 – 1	2 – 0	Yes
Grimsby Town	1 – 2	1 – 1	No
Harrogate Town	3 – 1	1 – 1	No
Hartlepool United	2 – 1	1 – 1	No
Leyton Orient	1 – 0	0 – 0	No
Mansfield Town	1 – 0	1 – 1	No
Newport County	1 – 1	0 – 3	No
Rochdale	3 – 0	1 – 1	No
Salford City	0 – 1	1 – 2	No
Stevenage	1 – 1	3 – 2	No
Stockport County	2 – 1	0 – 2	No
Sutton United	2 – 2	2 – 1	No
Swindon Town	1 – 2	2 – 1	No
Tranmere Rovers	0 – 0	1 – 0	No
Walsall	0 – 0	0 – 1	No

== Awards ==
=== Club awards ===
At the end of the season, Northampton's annual award ceremony, including categories voted for by the players and backroom staff, the supporters, will see the players recognised for their achievements for the club throughout the 2022–23 season.

Player of the Year Award	Sam Hoskins
Players' Player of the Year Award	Sam Hoskins
Academy Player of the Year Award	Josh Tomlinson
Goal of the Season Award	Jack Sowerby (vs. Crawley Town)

=== Divisional awards ===
Date	Nation	Winner	Award
August 2022	(England)	Sam Hoskins	EFL League Two Player of the Month
March 2023	(Australia)	Jon Brady	EFL League Two Manager of the Month
Season	(England)	Sam Hoskins	EFL Awards League Two Player of the Season
Season	(England)	Mitch Pinnock	EFL Awards Team of the Season
Season	(England)	Sam Hoskins	EFL Awards Team of the Season
Season	(England)	Sam Hoskins	PFA League Two Team of the Year

== Transfers ==
=== Transfers in ===
Date from	Position	Nationality	Name	From	Fee	Ref.
1 July 2022 (Note: The transfer was announced on 22 June, and would become official on July 1 once his Sunderland contract expired)	GK	(England)	Lee Burge	(England) Sunderland	Free transfer	
1 July 2022 (Note: The transfer was announced on 17 June, and would become official on July 1 once his Grimsby Town contract expired)	CM	(England)	Ben Fox	(England) Grimsby Town	Free transfer	
1 July 2022 (Note: The transfer was announced on 20 June, and would become official on July 1 once his Newport County contract expired)	LB	(England)	Ryan Haynes	(Wales) Newport County	Free transfer	
1 July 2022 (Note: The transfer was announced on 21 June, and would become official on July 1 once his Luton Town contract expired)	CF	(England)	Danny Hylton	(England) Luton Town	Free transfer	
2 July 2022	CB	(England)	Akin Odimayo	(England) Swindon Town	Compensation	
5 July 2022	CB	(England)	Sam Sherring	(England) AFC Bournemouth	Compensation	
11 July 2022	RB	(England)	Harvey Lintott	(England) Gillingham	Free transfer	
28 July 2022	CB	(England)	Tyler Magloire	(England) Blackburn Rovers	Undisclosed	
12 December 2022	AM	(England)	Josh Harrop	(England) Preston North End	Free transfer	
14 January 2023	GK	(Wales)	Tom King	(England) Salford City	Free transfer	
26 January 2023	CM	(Republic of Ireland)	Will Hondermarck	(England) Barnsley	Undisclosed	
11 March 2023	LB	(England)	Paul Osew	(England) AFC Wimbledon	Free transfer	
25 March 2023	CB	(Canada)	David Norman Jr.	(Canada) Cavalry	Free transfer	

=== Loans in ===
Date from	Position	Nationality	Name	Loaned from	On loan until	Ref.
12 July 2022	CF	(Scotland)	Kieron Bowie	(England) Fulham	End of season	
25 July 2022	CM	(Scotland)	Marc Leonard	(England) Brighton & Hove Albion	End of season	
19 August 2022	CF	(Belgium)	Josh Eppiah	(England) Leicester City	End of season	
31 January 2023	CF	(Australia)	Tete Yengi	(England) Ipswich Town	End of season	
31 January 2023	W	(England)	D'Margio Wright-Phillips	(England) Stoke City	End of season	

=== Transfers out ===
Date from	Position	Nationality	Name	To	Fee	Ref.
10 June 2022 (Note: The transfer was announced on 1 June, and would become official on June 10, once the transfer window opened)	CM	(England)	Paul Lewis	(England) Tranmere Rovers	Free transfer	
21 June 2022	CF	(Democratic Republic of the Congo)	Nicke Kabamba	(England) Barnet	Contract cancelled	
30 June 2022	CF	(England)	Benny Ashley-Seal	(Finland) Kotkan Työväen Palloilijat	Released	
30 June 2022	CB	(England)	Josh Flanagan	(England) Brackley Town	Released	
30 June 2022	RB	(Republic of Ireland)	Michael Harriman	(England) Bedford Town	Released	
30 June 2022 (Note: The transfer was announced on 27 June and would become official on July 1, once his contract at the club expired)	CB	(England)	Fraser Horsfall	(England) Stockport County	Rejected contract	
30 June 2022	LB	(England)	Joseph Mills	Retired		
30 June 2022	CB	(England)	Sid Nelson	(England) Woking	Released	
30 June 2022	CM	(England)	Scott Pollock	(England) Boston United	Released	
30 June 2022 (Note: The transfer was announced on 21 June and would become official on July 1, once his contract at the club expired)	GK	(England)	Liam Roberts	(England) Middlesbrough	Rejected contract	
30 June 2022	CF	(England)	Danny Rose	(England) Stevenage	Released	
28 July 2022	CB	(Republic of Ireland)	Ryan Nolan	(Scotland) Raith Rovers	Undisclosed	

=== Loans out ===
Date from	Position	Nationality	Name	Loaned to	On loan until	Ref.
5 August 2022	CF	(England)	Jack Connor	(England) AFC Rushden & Diamonds	3 January 2023	
5 August 2022	RW	(England)	Miguel Ngwa	(England) AFC Rushden & Diamonds	3 January 2023	
12 November 2022	MF	(England)	Peter Abimbola	(England) AFC Rushden & Diamonds	12 December 2022	
24 November 2022	CM	(England)	Liam Cross	(England) Leamington	24 December 2022	
24 December 2022	CB	(England)	Josh Tomlinson	(England) Harborough Town	24 January 2023	
6 January 2023	GK	(England)	James Dadge	(England) St Ives Town	Work experience	
6 January 2023	MF	(England)	Ayo Lekuti	(England) Bromsgrove Sporting	Work experience	
11 January 2023	FW	(England)	Kai O'Keeffe	(England) Daventry Town	Work experience	
13 January 2023	MF	(England)	Peter Abimbola	(England) Aldershot Town	13 February 2023	
13 January 2023	AM	(England)	Rico Duggan	(England) Wellingborough Town	Work experience	
13 January 2023	RB	(England)	Brad Smith-Howes	(England) Wellingborough Town	Work experience	
14 January 2023	RM	(England)	Miguel Ngwa	(England) Rushall Olympic	14 February 2023	
18 January 2023	MF	(England)	Dylan Hill	(England) Harborough Town	Work experience	
31 January 2023	CB	(England)	Josh Tomlinson	(England) Barwell	28 February 2023	
