= Tom King (footballer, born 1995) =

Wales international footballer (born 1995)

Personal information
- Full name: Thomas Lloyd King
- Date of birth: 9 March 1995 (age 31)
- Place of birth: Plymouth, England
- Height: 6 ft 4 in (1.94 m)
- Position: Goalkeeper

Team information
- Current team: Everton
- Number: 31

Youth career
- 2004–2008: Manchester 62
- 2008–2011: Portsmouth
- 2011–2014: Crystal Palace

Senior career*
Years	Team	Apps	(Gls)
2014–2019	Millwall	11	(0)
2015	→ Welling United (loan)	20	(0)
2016	→ Braintree Town (loan)	16	(0)
2018	→ Stevenage (loan)	18	(0)
2018	→ Wimbledon (loan)	12	(0)
2019–2021	Newport County	40	(1)
2021–2023	Salford City	57	(0)
2023	Northampton Town	8	(0)
2023–2025	Wolverhampton Wanderers	1	(0)
2025–	Everton	0	(0)

International career
2010–2011	England U17	1	(0)
2024	Wales	1	(0)
- * Club domestic league appearances and goals as of 18:59, 15 August 2025 (UTC)

Thomas Lloyd King (born 9 March 1995) is a professional footballer who plays as a goalkeeper for Premier League club Everton.

== Club career ==
=== Millwall ===
King signed a one-year contract with Millwall in August 2014, having left the Crystal Palace youth team earlier in the season.

He joined National League club Welling United on an initial one-month youth loan on 24 July 2015. He went on to make 20 appearances for the "Wings", before he was recalled by Millwall on 21 December.

King returned to the National League on 19 February 2016, joining Braintree Town for an initial 28-day emergency loan. In his second appearance for the club, against Guiseley at Nethermoor Park, King became involved in a controversial incident during an 1–1 draw. He conceded the equalising goal after Oliver Norburn broke a fair play protocol and lobbed him from 30-yards out rather than passing the ball to him, after Braintree had kicked the ball into touch to allow an injured Braintree player to receive treatment; a five-minute fracas followed but the goal was allowed to stand after security staff separated the players and management, and Guiseley manager Mark Bower refused to allow Braintree to walk through and score. Bower went on to say: "Their keeper stood there with his arms in the air and allowed the ball to into the net. It put us in a really difficult position whether we should allow them to score or not but we decided no. I think their keeper was trying to be clever and had simply let the ball go in." King said he was "bewildered" by Bower's statement, and speaking on the incident itself said that: "It is one of those things that will be remembered for a long time, I'll be remembered for a long time and it will carry on forever". The incident was described as "one of the biggest on-field controversies seen in non-league football", and Braintree manager Danny Cowley said that: "it's the worst thing I've seen on a football pitch and it was disgraceful unsporting behaviour on their part". The following week, Guiseley chairman Phil Rogerson released a statement recognising the fair-play convention had not been followed: "... myself, Mark [Bower] and the club find the situation most regrettable and not in line with the general ethos of Guiseley AFC. Fair play is and always has been at the heart of the club. The decision to continue playing as normal after the goal was taken on the spur of the moment and under extreme pressure, not helped at all by the heated atmosphere." King went on to extend his loan at Cressing Road until the end of the 2015–16 season, and Braintree qualified for the play-offs, losing out to Grimsby Town at the semi-final stage following a 2–1 aggregate defeat.

King made his first team debut for Millwall in a 2–1 defeat to Nottingham Forest in an EFL Cup Second Round match at The Den on 23 August 2016.

King signed an 18-month contract extension with Millwall on 4 January 2018. On the same day, he joined League Two side Stevenage on loan for the rest of the 2017–18 season. King made his debut for Stevenage two days after signing, keeping a clean sheet in the club's 0–0 home draw with Reading in the Third Round of the FA Cup.

On 27 June 2018 King joined AFC Wimbledon on a season long loan. King started the season as first choice goalkeeper but soon fell behind the Dons reserve goalkeeper Joe McDonnell in the pecking order as the Dons struggled at the bottom of the table. His season-long loan was cut short when recalled by Millwall in January having started only 11 League games for the Dons, who had already replaced him with the loan of Aaron Ramsdale on loan from Bournemouth.

=== Newport County ===
On 7 June 2019, King joined League Two club Newport County on a two-year contract. On 3 August 2019 he made his debut for Newport in a 2–2 draw against Mansfield Town, saving a second half penalty. In September 2019, King was nominated for the August PFA League Two Player of the Month Award, after five successive clean sheets, and more than 500 minutes of football played without conceding for the South Wales side, who had climbed to second place in the league.

King scored the first goal of his career on 19 January 2021, with a wind-assisted goal kick in the 12th minute of Newport's 1–1 League Two draw at Cheltenham Town. On 21 January 2021, his goal was confirmed to have broken the Guinness World Record for longest football goal, with a distance of 96.01 metres (315.0 ft), a record previously held, since November 2013, by Asmir Begović. King played for Newport in the League Two playoff final at Wembley Stadium on 31 May 2021 which Newport lost to Morecambe, 1–0 after a 107th-minute penalty. On 4 June 2021 it was announced that he would leave Newport County at the end of the 2020–21 season, following the expiration of his contract.

=== Salford City ===
On 7 July 2021, Salford City confirmed that they had signed King on a two-year deal.

=== Northampton Town ===
On 14 January 2023, King signed for fellow League Two club Northampton Town on a six-month deal after agreeing a release from his Salford contract. Having been dropped for Alex Cairns, King's availability arrived at a good moment for Northampton due to an injury to Lee Burge.

=== Wolverhampton Wanderers ===
On 3 July 2023, King joined Wolverhampton Wanderers on a free transfer following his release from Northampton Town. He featured as a 78th minute substitute in a friendly against Stade Rennais in Wolves' 3–1 win. This marked his debut for the club. In February 2024 King signed a two-year contract extension with Wolves. King made his Premier League debut for Wolves at the age of 30 in the 1–1 draw against Brentford on 25 May 2025 as a second half substitute.

=== Everton ===
On 15 August 2025 King joined Everton on a two year contract.

== International career ==
King was capped by England at under-16 and under-17 level. He also qualified for Wales as his mother was born in Cardiff as well as being eligible for Gibraltar through residency, having spent several years there as a child, where he first started playing football in the youth ranks at Manchester United (Gibraltar).

On 7 November 2019, King was called up to the Wales national football team for the first time for the UEFA Euro 2020 qualifying matches against Azerbaijan and Hungary. In August 2021, following the withdrawal of Adam Davies due to a positive COVID-19 test, King was called up in the squad for the September international fixtures—a friendly against Finland and 2022 FIFA World Cup qualifiers against Belarus and Estonia.

On 6 June 2024, King finally made his international debut for Wales in a friendly match against Gibraltar, coming on as a substitute for Adam Davies in a 0–0 draw.

== Career statistics ==
=== Club ===
As of match played 25 May 2025

Appearances and goals by club, season and competition
Club	Season	League			FA Cup		EFL Cup		Other		Total	
Club	Season	Division	Apps	Goals	Apps	Goals	Apps	Goals	Apps	Goals	Apps	Goals
Millwall	2014–15	Championship	0	0	0	0	0	0	—		0	0
Millwall	2015–16	League One	0	0	—		—		0	0	0	0
Millwall	2016–17	League One	11	0	1	0	1	0	4 (Note: Appearances in EFL Trophy)	0	17	0
Millwall	2017–18	Championship	0	0	—		2	0	—		2	0
Millwall	2018–19	Championship	0	0	0	0	—		—		0	0
Millwall	Total		11	0	1	0	3	0	4	0	19	0
Welling United (loan)	2015–16	National League	20	0	0	0	—		0	0	20	0
Braintree Town (loan)	2015–16	National League	16	0	—		—		2 (Note: Appearances in National League play-offs)	0	18	0
Stevenage (loan)	2017–18	League Two	18	0	2	0	—		0	0	20	0
AFC Wimbledon (loan)	2018–19	League One	12	0	0	0	2	0	2	0	16	0
Newport County	2019–20	League Two	31	0	2	0	0	0	2	0	35	0
Newport County	2020–21	League Two	9	1	2	0	1	0	2	0	14	1
Newport County	Total		40	1	4	0	1	0	4	0	49	1
Salford City	2021–22	League Two	36	0	1	0	1	0	0	0	38	0
Salford City	2022–23	League Two	21	0	2	0	1	0	2	0	26	0
Salford City	Total		57	0	3	0	2	0	2	0	64	0
Northampton Town	2022–23	League Two	8	0	—		—		—		8	0
Wolverhampton Wanderers	2023–24	Premier League	0	0	0	0	0	0	—		0	0
Wolverhampton Wanderers	2024–25	Premier League	1	0	0	0	0	0	—		1	0
Wolverhampton Wanderers	Total		1	0	0	0	0	0	—		0	0
Everton	2025–26	Premier League	0	0	0	0	0	0	—		0	0
Everton	2026–27	Premier League	0	0	0	0	0	0	—		0	0
Everton	Total		0	0	0	0	0	0	—		0	0
Career total			183	1	10	0	8	0	14	0	215	1

=== International ===
Appearances and goals by national team and year
National team	Year	Apps	Goals
Wales	2024	1	0
Total		1	0

== Honours ==
Millwall

- EFL League One play-offs: 2017
