= Miguel Ngwa =

English footballer (born 2004)

Personal information
- Date of birth: 4 June 2004 (age 22)
- Position: Midfielder

Team information
- Current team: Spalding United

Youth career
- Northampton Town

Senior career*
Years	Team	Apps	(Gls)
2021–2023	Northampton Town	0	(0)
2022–2023	→ AFC Rushden & Diamonds (loan)	20	(3)
2023	→ Rushall Olympic (loan)	7	(0)
2023	→ Spalding United (loan)	6	(0)
2023	Barwell	6	(0)
2023–	Spalding United	0	(0)
- * Club domestic league appearances and goals as of 00:00, 2 January 2023 (UTC)

Miguel Ngwa (born 4 June 2004) is an English professional footballer who plays as a midfielder for National League North club Spalding United.

== Career ==
Ngwa made his first-team debut for Northampton Town on 2 November 2021, in a 2–1 defeat to Brighton & Hove Albion U21 in an EFL Trophy match at Sixfields Stadium. He signed his first professional contract in June 2022. He joined Southern League Premier Division Central side AFC Rushden & Diamonds on loan during the 2022–23 season and scored his first senior goal for the club in a 2–1 defeat at Royston Town. Throughout the remainder of the season, he spent time on loan with both Rushall Olympic and Spalding United. He was released by Northampton upon the expiration of his contract in June 2023.

Following his release from Northampton, Ngwa joined Barwell before returning to Spalding United on a permanent basis in October 2023.

== Career statistics ==
As of match played 2 January 2023

Appearances and goals by club, season and competition
Club	Season	League			FA Cup		EFL Cup		Other		Total	
Club	Season	Division	Apps	Goals	Apps	Goals	Apps	Goals	Apps	Goals	Apps	Goals
Northampton Town	2021–22	EFL League Two	0	0	0	0	0	0	1 (Note: Appearances in the EFL Trophy)	0	1	0
Northampton Town	2022–23	EFL League Two	0	0	0	0	0	0	2	0	2	0
Northampton Town	Total		0	0	0	0	0	0	3	0	3	0
AFC Rushden & Diamonds (loan)	2022–23	Southern League; Premier Division Central	16	1	0	0	0	0	1 (Note: Appearances in the FA Trophy)	0	17	1
Spalding United (loan)	2022–23	NPL Division One Midlands	5	0	0	0	—		1 (Note: Appearance(s) in NPL Division One Midlands play-offs)	0	6	0
Career total			21	1	0	0	0	0	5	0	26	1
