= Jake Buxton =

English footballer (born 1985)

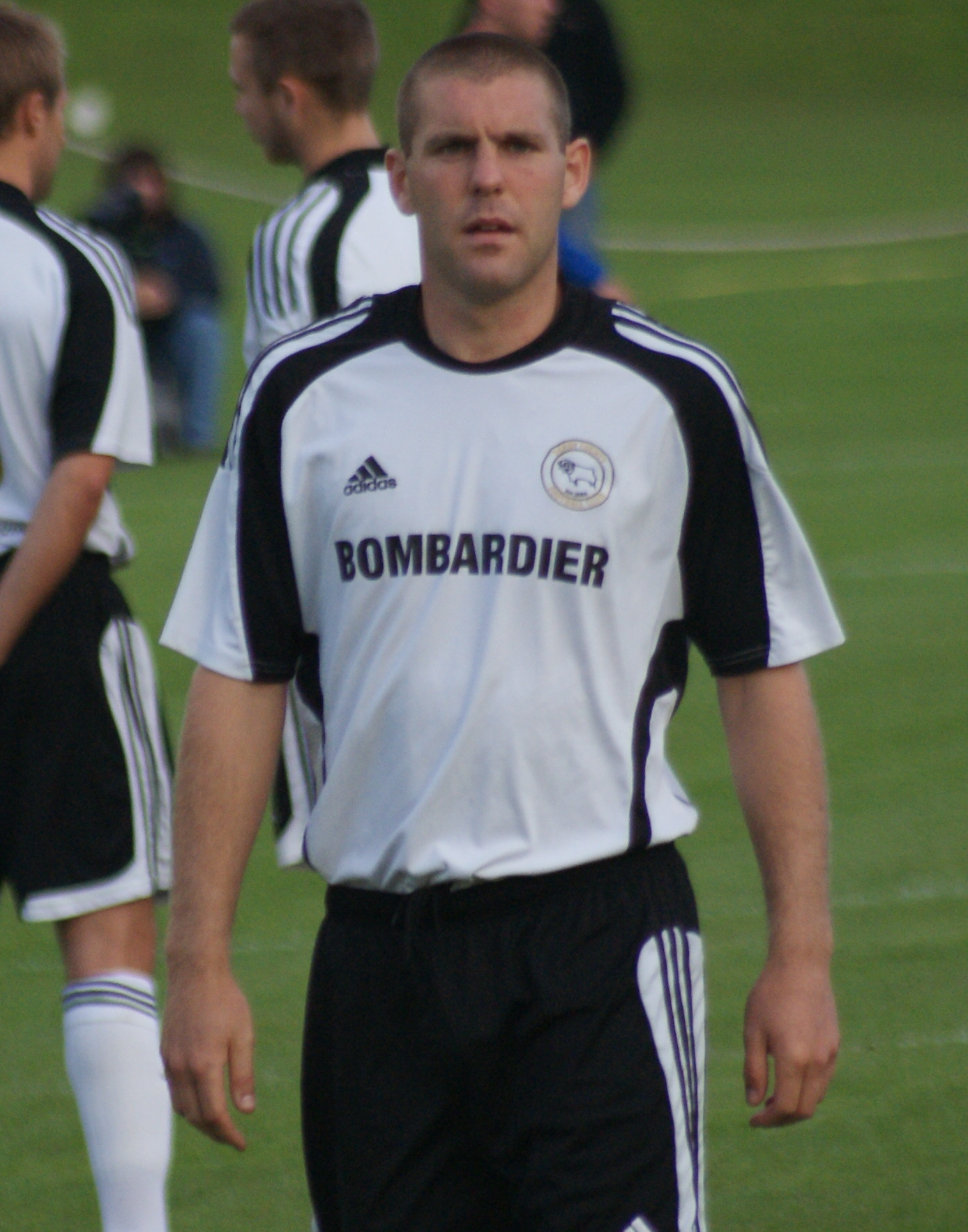
- Buxton playing for Derby County in 2009

Personal information
- Full name: Jake Fred Buxton
- Date of birth: 4 March 1985 (age 41)
- Place of birth: Sutton-in-Ashfield, England
- Height: 5 ft 11 in (1.80 m)
- Position: Defender

Team information
- Current team: Alfreton Town (manager)

Youth career
- 2000–2002: Mansfield Town

Senior career*
Years	Team	Apps	(Gls)
2002–2008	Mansfield Town	151	(5)
2003	→ Alfreton Town (loan)	5	(0)
2008–2009	Burton Albion	40	(0)
2009–2016	Derby County	139	(11)
2016–2017	Wigan Athletic	39	(1)
2017–2020	Burton Albion	87	(1)
Total		461	(18)

Managerial career
- 2020: Burton Albion
- 2025–: Alfreton Town
- * Club domestic league appearances and goals as of 20:12, 19 December 2020 (UTC)

Jake Fred Buxton (born 4 March 1985) is an English former professional footballer and manager who played as a defender. He is currently manager of Alfreton Town.

His playing career consisted of spells at Mansfield Town from 2002 to 2008, with a loan period at Alfreton Town in 2003. He then moved to Burton Albion for the 2008–09 season, before joining Derby County in 2009 where he stayed until 2016. He then spent the 2016–17 season at Wigan Athletic before moving to Burton Albion in 2017.

He was named player-manager for Burton Albion in May 2020 before being dismissed in December 2020 this also coincided with the end of his playing career. He later worked as a coach in Derby County's academy where he was lead coach for the club's under-18 team, and from July 2023 to June 2025 he was the club's under-21 lead coach. In 2025 he was appointed manager of Alfreton Town.

== Playing career ==
=== Mansfield Town ===
Born in Sutton-in-Ashfield, Nottinghamshire, Buxton came up through the youth system at Mansfield, winning the Youth Team Player of the Year award in 2002, and made his first-team debut in October 2002 in a EFL Trophy match against Crewe Alexandra. However, it was not until the 2004–05 season that he established himself as a regular member of the first team and his form was rewarded with a new one-year contract in February 2005. In April 2006, Buxton signed a new two-and-a-half-year contract, and was made team captain, one of the youngest in the country, during the 2006–07 season.

By the end of the 2007–08 season, he had played over 160 first-team games for Mansfield, scoring five goals. After Mansfield Town were relegated to the Football Conference at the end of the 2007–08 season, he was out of contract but was offered new terms by the club. Following a takeover of the club and change of manager, Buxton was released by mutual consent after expressing his desire to stay in the Football League.

=== Burton Albion ===
After leaving Mansfield, Buxton had a trial spell with Crewe, but Crewe decided not to sign him so he joined Burton Albion in August 2008 on a free transfer. Buxton's performances at Burton earned him rave reviews as he helped the Brewers to the Conference National title, and he was named Player of the Month for November 2008. He won the club's annual player of the year award and attracted much interest from league clubs.

=== Derby County ===
At the end of the 2008–09 season, Buxton signed a one-year contract, with an option of a one-year extension, to rejoin former manager Nigel Clough at Championship side Derby County when his contract with Burton expired at the end of June 2009. Buxton made his Derby début on 8 August 2009, playing the full 90 minutes as Derby beat Peterborough United 2–1 at home, Buxton getting an assist for Miles Addison's goal. His first goal for Derby came in their 2–1 victory at home to Plymouth Argyle on 22 August. After playing the first six games of the season, an injury in the sixth, a 3–2 defeat at Nottingham Forest, saw Buxton undergo an operation for a hernia. Despite being ruled out for several weeks, Buxton was fit enough to feature on the bench ten days later, and later played 90 minutes for the reserves. However, he then picked up a groin strain and was ruled out for several more weeks. In December, Derby took up the option of a one-year extension to his contract. After being out for three months through injury, Buxton returned to the starting eleven on 26 December in a 2–0 defeat to Blackpool, in what would be his first of six consecutive starts for Derby. He finished the season with 24 starts in all competitions, describing his first full season for the club as "a dream come true."

During the 2011 close season, Buxton underwent groin surgery which ruled him out for four to six weeks and meant he missed the majority of Derby's pre-season campaign. He returned to action as a second-half substitute in a 3–1 win for a Derby County XI against former club Burton Albion in the Bass Charity Vase final on 28 July 2012. He then injured his back, ruling him out of the start of the 2010–11 season before undergoing back surgery to clear up the injuries which had forced him out of the first team picture for seven months. He returned to first team action four months later with an 89th-minute substitute appearance in a 1–0 win at Sheffield United on 27 February 2011, which would prove to be his only first-team appearance of the campaign.

Derby made a strong start the 2011–12 season, featuring in the play-off spots for the first three months of the campaign. However, a sharp decline in form from November onwards, coupled with a season-ending injury to Shaun Barker, allowed Buxton the opportunity to cement a place in the Derby starting eleven and he appeared in the majority of Derby's fixtures from November onwards. He even earned cult status amongst the Derby support with a stoppage-time winner in the East Midlands derby at home to Nottingham Forest to earn Derby a first league double over their archrivals in 40 years. Buxton was eventually rewarded with a two-year extension to his contract, keeping him at the club until the summer of 2014.

Ahead of the 2012–13 season, Buxton was placed as Derby's most experience available defender following the sale of Jason Shackell to Burnley and the injury to Barker, and Nigel Clough stated his faith in Buxton's ability to become a first team regular at Championship level, Buxton opened the season with three goals in two games, with a brace in a 5–5 League Cup draw with Scunthorpe United and a strike in the opening league game against Sheffield Wednesday. Buxton spent the start of the season in and out of the starting line-up, competing with new signing James O'Connor to start alongside captain Richard Keogh, a battle Buxton was winning until he was sent off for a second bookable offence in the 3–0 loss at Peterborough United on 27 October 2012. After several games on the bench after his suspension, Buxton returned to the starting before being ruled out for two months after picking up a knee injury following his goal in a 3–1 win against Leeds United. Buxton returned to first team action in a 2–2 draw at Sheffield Wednesday and was praised for his courage by Clough after he was forced to start at short notice due to an injury picked up by Mark O'Brien in the pre-match warm-up. Buxton retained his place in the starting line-up alongside Keogh and scored his fifth goal of the season with an 88th-minute winner in a 2–1 win at Leeds United on 1 April. Later on in the month, Buxton signed a new two-year contract.

Despite losing his squad number of 5, Buxton was considered to be the first choice centre back for 2013–14, as Shaun Barker and Mark O'Brien were still recovering from knee injuries.

On 30 June 2014, Jake Buxton signed a new three-year contract with Derby County, which would see him stay at the club until the end of the 2016/17 season. Ahead of the 2014–15 season, Buxton regained his number 5 shirt following the continued absence of Shaun Barker.

=== Wigan Athletic ===
On 26 July 2016, Buxton joined newly promoted side Wigan Athletic for an undisclosed fee and signed a three-year contract. He scored his first goal for Wigan in a 1–0 win at Wolverhampton Wanderers on 14 February 2017. He left Wigan on 20 June 2017 when he agreed to mutually terminate his contract to move back to Nottinghamshire.

=== Burton Albion ===
On 28 June 2017, Buxton rejoined Burton Albion. He was offered a new contract by the club at the end of the 2017–18 season, following their relegation.

== Coaching career ==
On 18 May 2020, Buxton was appointed as player-manager of Burton Albion, following the resignation of previous manager Nigel Clough.

On 29 December 2020, Buxton was sacked after two wins in 21 games in the league and the Brewers rock bottom, six points off safety in League One.

After leaving Burton, Jake Buxton started work in the Derby County Academy as a Professional Development Phase Coach, in October 2022 he started work as the club's under-18 lead coach. Ahead of the 2023–24 season, Buxton was appointed the clubs under-21 lead coach on 26 July 2023 after a restructuring of the Derby's academy. In February 2025, Buxton worked as an assistant head coach to caretaker manager Matt Hamshaw. In June 2025 Buxton was appointed Senior Transition Coach for Derby County's first team, a role where he would help players in transition from academy football to first-team football. He was appointed manager of Alfreton Town in October 2025.

== Career statistics ==
=== Playing statistics ===
Appearances and goals by club, season and competition
Club	Season	League			FA Cup		League Cup		Other		Total	
Club	Season	Division	Apps	Goals	Apps	Goals	Apps	Goals	Apps	Goals	Apps	Goals
Mansfield Town	2002–03	Second Division	3	0	0	0	0	0	1 (Note: Appearances in the Football League Trophy)	0	4	0
Mansfield Town	2003–04	Third Division	9	1	1	0	0	0	1	0	11	1
Mansfield Town	2004–05	League Two	30	1	2	0	0	0	1	0	33	1
Mansfield Town	2005–06	League Two	39	0	3	0	2	0	0	0	44	0
Mansfield Town	2006–07	League Two	30	1	2	0	2	0	2	0	36	1
Mansfield Town	2007–08	League Two	40	2	4	0	1	0	1	0	46	2
Mansfield Town	Total		151	5	12	0	5	0	6	0	174	5
Alfreton Town (loan)	2003–04	NPL-Premier Division	5	0	0	0	0	0	0	0	5	0
Burton Albion	2008–09	Conference Premier	40	0	1	0	0	0	2 (Note: Appearances in the FA Trophy)	0	43	0
Derby County	2009–10	Championship	19	1	4	0	1	0	0	0	24	1
Derby County	2010–11	Championship	1	0	0	0	0	0	0	0	1	0
Derby County	2011–12	Championship	21	2	2	0	0	0	0	0	23	2
Derby County	2012–13	Championship	31	3	0	0	1	2	0	0	32	5
Derby County	2013–14	Championship	45	2	1	0	3	0	3 (Note: Appearances in the Championship play-offs)	0	52	2
Derby County	2014–15	Championship	19	3	2	0	2	0	0	0	23	3
Derby County	2015–16	Championship	3	0	1	0	0	0	0	0	4	0
Derby County	Total		139	13	10	0	7	2	3	0	159	13
Wigan Athletic	2016–17	Championship	39	1	2	0	1	0	0	0	42	1
Burton Albion	2017–18	Championship	33	0	1	0	0	0	0	0	34	0
Burton Albion	2018–19	League One	30	0	0	0	4	0	1	0	35	0
Burton Albion	2019–20	League One	24	1	4	0	1	0	1	0	30	1
Burton Albion	Total		87	1	5	0	5	0	2	0	99	1
Career total			461	18	30	0	18	2	13	0	522	20

=== Managerial statistics ===
Managerial record by team and tenure
Team	From	To	Record				
Team	From	To	P	W	D	L	Win %
Burton Albion	19 May 2020	29 December 2020	27	2	10	15	7.41
Alfreton Town	17 October 2025	Present	37	10	12	15	27.03
Total			64	12	22	30	18.75

== Honours ==
Burton Albion

- Conference Premier: 2008–09

Individual

- Conference Premier Player of the Month: November 2008
