= Ben Fox (footballer) =

English footballer (born 1998)

Personal information
- Full name: Benjamin Jake Fox
- Date of birth: 1 February 1998 (age 28)
- Place of birth: Burton upon Trent, England
- Height: 5 ft 11 in (1.80 m)
- Position: Midfielder

Team information
- Current team: Harrogate Town
- Number: 27

Senior career*
Years	Team	Apps	(Gls)
2016–2021	Burton Albion	37	(1)
2016–2017	→ Tamworth (loan)	20	(2)
2017	→ Solihull Moors (loan)	5	(0)
2017	→ Tamworth (loan)	5	(0)
2017–2018	→ Gateshead (loan)	12	(2)
2021–2022	Grimsby Town	32	(1)
2022–2025	Northampton Town	54	(4)
2025–	Harrogate Town	29	(1)
- * Club domestic league appearances and goals as of 16:00, 03 January 2025 (UTC)

Benjamin Jake Fox (born 1 February 1998) is an English professional footballer who plays as a midfielder for National League club Harrogate Town.

Fox came through the youth academy at Burton Albion and progressed to the first team where he made 37 league appearances over a 5 year spell. Whilst with Albion he spent time on loan with non-league sides Tamworth, Solihull Moors, Gateshead and Barnet.

Fox moved to Grimsby Town in the summer of 2021 and was part of the team that won promotion to the Football League by winning the National League play-offs in 2022. On June 17, 2022, Fox signed a two-year deal with Northampton Town.

== Career ==
=== Burton Albion ===
Fox was included in the first team squad during the 2016–17 season, and was allocated the number 21 squad number. He was given his debut in the EFL Cup match against Liverpool on 23 August 2016, coming on as a 65th-minute substitute for Lloyd Dyer, a game in which Burton lost 5–0. Fox was given his EFL Championship debut on 17 September 2016, coming on as 77th-minute substitute for Hamza Choudhury in a home game against Brighton & Hove Albion which they lost 1–0. He scored his first goal for Burton in an EFL Cup tie against Cardiff City on 22 August 2017.

Fox joined Conference North side Tamworth on 1 December 2016, on an initial one-month loan, which was later extended to the rest of the season on 8 February 2017. The following season, he spent time on loan with Solihull Moors, had a second loan spell at Tamworth, and then went on loan for a third time that season, this time at Gateshead.

Fox broke into the first team at Burton in the 2018–19 season, but in July 2019 he was ruled out of action until March 2020 with an anterior cruciate ligament injury. In December 2020 he joined Barnet on a one-month loan, with a view to an extension until the end of the season. Fox scored on his debut in the FA Trophy against Dorking Wanderers, but later received a straight red card for a late tackle in a 3–1 defeat. His suspension, followed by subsequent match postponements, and a change of management at Burton meant this was his only game for the club.

On 12 May 2021 it was announced that he would be one of 12 players leaving Burton at the end of the season.

=== Grimsby Town ===
On 15 June 2021, Fox joined Grimsby Town on a one-year deal.

Fox earned the man of the match award as The Mariners defeated Solihull Moors 2-1 at the London Stadium in the 2022 National League play-off final.

=== Northampton Town ===
On 17 June 2022, Fox signed for fellow EFL League Two side Northampton Town having rejected a new deal from Grimsby.

On 14 May 2024, the club announced Fox had signed a new contract for a year with the option of a further year.

=== Harrogate Town ===
On 3 February 2025, Fox joined National League club Harrogate Town on a free transfer on a two-and-a-half year deal.

== Career statistics ==
As of match played 17 December 2024

Appearances and goals by club, season and competition
Club	Season	League			National Cup		League Cup		Other		Total	
Club	Season	Division	Apps	Goals	Apps	Goals	Apps	Goals	Apps	Goals	Apps	Goals
Burton Albion	2016–17	Championship	1	0	0	0	1	0	—		2	0
Burton Albion	2017–18	Championship	0	0	0	0	2	1	—		2	1
Burton Albion	2018–19	League One	27	1	0	0	7	0	2 (Note: Appearances in the EFL Trophy)	0	36	1
Burton Albion	2019–20	League One	0	0	0	0	0	0	0	0	0	0
Burton Albion	2020–21	League One	9	0	0	0	1	0	2	0	12	0
Burton Albion	Total		37	1	0	0	11	1	4	0	52	2
Tamworth (loan)	2016–17	National League North	20	2	0	0	—		0	0	20	2
Solihull Moors (loan)	2017–18	National League	5	0	0	0	—		0	0	5	0
Tamworth (loan)	2017–18	National League North	5	0	0	0	—		1 (Note: Appearance(s) in the FA Trophy)	0	6	0
Gateshead (loan)	2017–18	National League	12	2	0	0	—		0	0	12	2
Barnet (loan)	2020–21	National League	0	0	0	0	—		1	1	1	1
Grimsby Town	2021–22	National League	32	1	2	0	—		4 (Note: One appearance in FA Trophy, two appearances in National League playoffs)	0	38	1
Northampton Town	2022–23	League Two	22	4	1	0	1	0	3	0	27	4
Northampton Town	2023–24	League One	19	0	0	0	0	0	1	0	20	0
Northampton Town	2024–25	League One	13	0	1	0	1	0	2	1	17	1
Northampton Town	Total		54	4	2	0	2	1	6	1	64	5
Career total			165	10	4	0	13	1	16	2	198	13

== Honours ==
Grimsby Town

- National League play-off winners: 2022

Northampton Town

- EFL League Two promotion: 2022–23
