= Carl Johnston =

Association football player from Northern Ireland

Personal information
- Full name: Carl Robert Johnston
- Date of birth: 29 May 2002 (age 24)
- Place of birth: Belfast, Northern Ireland
- Height: 5 ft 9 in (1.75 m)
- Positions: Right-back; midfielder

Team information
- Current team: Peterborough United
- Number: 2

Youth career
- 2011–2018: Linfield
- 2018–2020: Fleetwood Town

Senior career*
Years	Team	Apps	(Gls)
2019–2025	Fleetwood Town	92	(3)
2020–2021	→ Farsley Celtic (loan)	15	(1)
2025–	Peterborough United	47	(0)

International career^{‡}
2017	Northern Ireland U15	2	(0)
2018–2019	Northern Ireland U17	9	(0)
2019	Northern Ireland U19	1	(0)
2021–2024	Northern Ireland U21	15	(1)
- * Club domestic league appearances and goals as of 17:16, 10 October 2026 (UTC) ‡ National team caps and goals as of 21:28, 23 August 2024 (UTC)

Carl Robert Johnston (born 29 May 2002) is a Northern Irish professional footballer who plays as a Right-back for EFL League One side Peterborough United.

== Club career ==
After spending seven years with the academy of Linfield, Johnston joined Fleetwood Town's academy in 2018.

In January 2020, Johnston signed his first professional contract with Fleetwood Town. In June 2020, he was one of 33 players to receive the League Football Education's 'The 11' award.

Johnson made his senior debut for the club on 1 September 2020 as a second-half substitute in a 3–1 EFL Trophy victory away to Carlisle United. He joined Farsley Celtic on a four-week-long youth loan in October 2020. On 7 January 2021, it was announced that Johnston would remain on loan at Farsley Celtic until the end of the 2020/21 season. On 15 January 2021, he signed a new contract with the club lasting until summer 2022, with the option of a further year. Johnston signed a new long-term contract in June 2022, keeping him at the club for a further three years with the option for a fourth.

On 4 January 2025, Johnston signed for League One side Peterborough United on a long-term deal for a "sizeable six-figure" fee. Johnston was cup-tied as Peterborough won the 2024-25 EFL Trophy by beating Birmingham City in the final.

== International career ==
He has played for Northern Ireland at under-17 level.

== Career statistics ==
As of match played 7 February 2026

Appearances and goals by club, season and competition
Club	Season	League			FA Cup		League Cup		Other		Total	
Club	Season	Division	Apps	Goals	Apps	Goals	Apps	Goals	Apps	Goals	Apps	Goals
Fleetwood Town	2019–20	League One	0	0	0	0	0	0	0	0	0	0
Fleetwood Town	2020–21	League One	0	0	0	0	0	0	2 (Note: Appearance(s) in EFL Trophy)	0	2	0
Fleetwood Town	2021–22	League One	17	0	0	0	0	0	1	0	18	0
Fleetwood Town	2022–23	League One	23	1	4	0	2	0	2	0	31	1
Fleetwood Town	2023–24	League One	33	1	1	0	0	0	1	0	35	1
Fleetwood Town	2024–25	League Two	19	1	1	0	3	0	1	0	24	1
Fleetwood Town	Total		92	3	6	0	5	0	7	0	110	3
Farsley Celtic (loan)	2020–21	National League North	15	1	—		—		2 (Note: Appearance(s) in FA Trophy)	0	17	1
Peterborough United	2024–25	League One	20	0	—		—		—		20	0
Peterborough United	2025–26	League One	20	0	0	0	0	0	4	0	24	0
Peterborough United	Total		40	0	0	0	0	0	4	0	44	0
Career total			147	4	6	0	5	0	13	0	171	4
