= 2022–23 Fleetwood Town F.C. season =

Fleetwood Town
2022–23 season
- Chairman: Andrew Pilley
- Head Coach: Scott Brown
- Stadium: Highbury Stadium
- League One: 13th
- FA Cup: Fifth round
- EFL Cup: Second round
- EFL Trophy: Group stage
- Top goalscorer: League: Daniel Batty (2); All: Daniel Batty (2)
Home colours

The 2022–23 season is the 115th season in the existence of Fleetwood Town Football Club and the club's ninth consecutive season in League One. In addition to the league, they will also compete in the 2022–23 FA Cup, the 2022–23 EFL Cup and the 2022–23 EFL Trophy.

== Transfers ==
=== In ===
| Date | Pos | Player | Transferred from | Fee | Ref |
|---|---|---|---|---|---|
| 21 June 2022 | CM | (England) Brendan Wiredu | (England) Colchester United | Undisclosed | |
| 22 June 2022 | CF | (England) Callum Morton | (England) West Bromwich Albion | Undisclosed | |
| 27 June 2022 | LB | (England) Josh Earl | (England) Preston North End | Free Transfer | |
| 1 July 2022 (Note: The transfer was announced on 13 June, and would become official on 1 July, once his Rochdale contract expired) | GK | (England) Jay Lynch | (England) Rochdale | Free Transfer | |
| 1 July 2022 (Note: The transfer was announced on 25 May, and would become official on 1 July, once his St Johnstone contract expired) | RB | (Scotland) Shaun Rooney | (Scotland) St Johnstone | Free Transfer | |
| 1 July 2022 (Note: The transfer was announced on 27 June, and would become official on 1 July, once his Leicester City contract expired) | CF | (Wales) Will Russ | (England) Leicester City | Free Transfer | |
| 1 July 2022 (Note: The transfer was announced on 8 June, and would become official on 1 July, once his Shrewsbury Town contract expired) | CM | (England) Josh Vela | (England) Shrewsbury Town | Free Transfer | |
| 21 July 2022 | RW | (Republic of Ireland) Promise Omochere | (Republic of Ireland) Bohemians | Undisclosed | |
| 4 August 2022 | CF | (Northern Ireland) Sam Glenfield | (Northern Ireland) Portadown | Undisclosed | |
| 4 August 2022 | GK | (Northern Ireland) Stephen McMullan | (Northern Ireland) Warrenpoint Town | Undisclosed | |
| 26 August 2022 | CB | (Scotland) Michael Devlin | (Scotland) Aberdeen | Free Transfer | |
| 1 January 2023 (Note: The transfer was announced on 19 December, and would become official on 1 January, once the transfer window re-opens) | LW | (Scotland) Phoenix Patterson | (Republic of Ireland) Waterford | Undisclosed | |
| 5 January 2023 | GK | (Republic of Ireland) David Harrington | (Republic of Ireland) Cork City | Undisclosed | |
| 6 January 2023 | AM | (England) Callum Dolan | (England) Warrington Rylands | Undisclosed | |
| 20 January 2023 | CM | (Scotland) Scott Robertson | (Scotland) Celtic | Undisclosed | |
| 30 January 2023 | CF | (England) Jack Marriott | (England) Peterborough United | Undiscloed | |
| 30 January 2023 | CF | (England) Jayden Stockley | (England) Charlton Athletic | Undiscloed | |
| 31 January 2023 | CF | (Guinea-Bissau) Junior Quitirna | (Republic of Ireland) Waterford | Undiscloed | |

=== Out ===
| Date | Pos | Player | Transferred to | Fee | Ref |
|---|---|---|---|---|---|
| 21 June 2022 | DM | (England) Jordan Rossiter | (England) Bristol Rovers | Undisclosed | |
| 30 June 2022 | DF | (England) Billy Batch | Unattached | Released | |
| 30 June 2022 | CM | (England) Harrison Biggins | (England) Doncaster Rovers | Released | |
| 30 June 2022 | CM | (Northern Ireland) Callum Camps | (England) Stockport County | Released | |
| 30 June 2022 | GK | (England) Connor Eastham | Unattached | Released | |
| 30 June 2022 | CM | (England) Matthew Fenton | Unattached | Released | |
| 30 June 2022 | GK | (Republic of Ireland) Kieran O'Hara | (England) Colchester United | Released | |
| 30 June 2022 | LW | (Republic of Ireland) Anthony Pilkington | Unattached | Released | |
| 30 June 2022 | MF | (England) Covy Smith | Unattached | Released | |
| 30 June 2022 | CF | (England) Donte Thompson-Prempeh | Unattached | Released | |
| 30 June 2022 | GK | (England) Harry Wright | Unattached | Mutual Consent | |
| 10 July 2022 | RB | (England) Brad Halliday | (England) Bradford City | Mutual Consent | |
| 4 August 2022 | RW | (England) Shayden Morris | (Scotland) Aberdeen | Undisclosed | |
| 11 August 2022 | CF | (Wales) Ellis Harrison | (England) Port Vale | Undisclosed | |
| 13 January 2023 | CF | (England) Callum Morton | (England) Salford City | Undisclosed | |
| 19 January 2023 | CF | (England) Joe Garner | (England) Carlisle United | Undisclosed | |
| 31 January 2023 | CB | (Scotland) Michael Devlin | Unattached | Released | |
| 31 January 2023 | CF | (England) Gerard Garner | (England) Barrow | Undisclosed | |
| 31 January 2023 | AM | (Northern Ireland) Paddy Lane | (England) Portsmouth | Undisclosed | |

=== Loans in ===
| Date | Pos | Player | Loaned from | On loan until | Ref |
|---|---|---|---|---|---|
| 15 August 2022 | GK | (Poland) Jakub Stolarczyk | (England) Leicester City | 13 January 2023 (Note: On 13 January, Stolarczyk was recalled back to Leicester) | |
| 16 August 2022 | RW | (Spain) Carlos Mendes Gomes | (England) Luton Town | End of Season | |
| 1 September 2022 | CF | (Zimbabwe) Admiral Muskwe | (England) Luton Town | 31 January 2023 (Note: On 31 January, Muskwe returned to his parent club, Luton) | |
| 1 September 2022 | CM | (England) Lewis Warrington | (England) Everton | End of Season | |
| 31 January 2023 | CB | (Republic of Ireland) Corrie Ndaba | (England) Ipswich Town | End of Season | |

=== Loans out ===
| Date | Pos | Player | Loaned to | On loan until | Ref |
|---|---|---|---|---|---|
| 21 July 2022 | RM | (Northern Ireland) Chris Conn-Clarke | (England) Altrincham | 1 January 2023 | |
| 12 August 2022 | CB | (England) Thomas Hoyle | (England) Bamber Bridge | Youth Loan | |
| 13 September 2022 | CF | (Wales) Will Russ | (England) FC United of Manchester | 13 October 2022 | |
| 29 September 2022 | GK | (England) Tom Donaghy | (England) Lancaster City | 27 October 2022 | |
| 17 October 2022 | CF | (Wales) Will Russ | (England) South Shields | 1 January 2023 | |
| 21 October 2022 | DM | (Northern Ireland) Dylan Boyle | (England) Spennymoor Town | Youth Loan | |
| 24 October 2022 | CB | (England) Thomas Hoyle | (England) Colne | Youth Loan | |
| 24 October 2022 | RB | (England) Jake Wallace | (England) Colne | Youth Loan | |
| 12 November 2022 | GK | (England) Luc Rees | (England) Widnes | 10 December 2022 | |
| 26 November 2022 | GK | (England) Alex Cairns | (England) Hartlepool United | 3 December 2022 | |
| 3 December 2022 | CB | (England) Connor Teale | (England) Farsley Celtic | 1 February 2023 (Note: On 6 January, Teale's loan at Farsley was extended by a further month) | |
| 30 December 2022 | GK | (England) Tom Donaghy | (England) Colne | 30 January 2023 | |
| 4 January 2023 | GK | (England) Alex Cairns | (England) Salford City | End of Season | |
| 13 January 2023 | CF | (Wales) Will Russ | (England) Hyde United | End of Season (Note: On 26 February, Russ' loan at Hyde was extended until end of season) | |
| 18 January 2023 | CM | (Northern Ireland) Barry Baggley | (Republic of Ireland) Waterford | 30 November 2023 | |
| 31 January 2023 | CM | (Northern Ireland) Chris Conn-Clarke | (Republic of Ireland) Waterford | 30 November 2023 | |
| 31 January 2023 | CF | (Guinea-Bissau) Junior Quitirna | (England) Altrincham | 28 February 2023 | |
| 11 February 2023 | CB | (England) Connor Teale | (England) Alfreton Town | End of Season (Note: On 13 March, Teale's loan at Alfreton was extended until the end of the season) | |
| 16 February 2023 | CB | (England) Drew Baker | (Republic of Ireland) Bohemian | End of Season | |
| 16 February 2023 | GK | (England) Tom Donaghy | (Republic of Ireland) Waterford | End of Season | |
| 21 February 2023 | DM | (England) Dylan Boyle | (England) Curzon Ashton | End of Season | |
| 4 March 2023 | CB | (England) Will Johnson | (England) Marine | 1 April 2023 | |

== Pre-season and friendlies ==
The Cod Army announced they would travel to Pula in Croatia for a pre-season tour and play one friendly match against local opposition. The first of the clubs friendlies was confirmed on 8 June against Dundee United. A second followed a day later with a trip to Barrow. A behind-closed-doors friendly against Tranmere Rovers was next to be added to the pre-season calendar. As well as Stoke City and Rotherham United. During the club's trip to Croatia, a pre-season meeting with HNK Orijent 1919 was announced. On 25 July it was confirmed a XI side will face FC Halifax Town at Poolfoot Farm.

Win Draw Loss Fixtures

| 2 July 2022 Friendly | Fleetwood Town | 2–2 | Tranmere Rovers | Thornton-Cleveleys |
| 15:00 BST | Nsiala 45'; Lane 90' | Report | Hemmings 2'; Burton (?) | Stadium: Poolfoot Farm; Attendance: 0 (behind-closed-doors) |

| 7 July 2022 Friendly | Fleetwood Town | 0–2 | Rotherham United | Pula, Croatia |
| 19:00 CEST | | Report | Kelly 20', 60' (pen.) | Stadium: Park Plaza; Attendance: 0 (behind-closed-doors) |

| 9 July 2022 Friendly | HNK Orijent 1919 | 0–3 | Fleetwood Town | Rijeka, Croatia |
| 14:00 CEST | | Report | Lane 27'; Garner 38' (pen.); Nsiala 74' | Stadium: Stadion Krimeja |

| 16 July 2022 Friendly | Stoke City | 1–1 | Fleetwood Town | Stoke-on-Trent |
| 15:00 BST | Campbell (?) | Report | Batty (?) | Stadium: bet365 Stadium; Attendance: 0 (behind-closed-doors) |

| 19 July 2022 Friendly | Barrow | 0–1 | Fleetwood Town | Barrow-in-Furness |
| 19:00 BST | | Report | Batty 83' | Stadium: So Legal Stadium |

| 23 July 2022 Friendly | Fleetwood Town | 2–1 | Dundee United | Fleetwood |
| 15:00 BST | Batty 42'; Vela 88' | Report | Mulgrew 66' | Stadium: Highbury Stadium |

| 26 July 2022 Friendly | Fleetwood Town | 2–1 | FC Halifax Town | Thornton-Cleveleys |
| 13:00 BST | Garner (?); Omochere (?) | Report | Dieseruvwe (?) | Stadium: Poolfoot Farm; Attendance: 0 (behind-closed-doors) |

== Competitions ==
=== Overall record ===
| Competition | First match | Last match | Starting round | Record | | | | | | | |
| Competition | First match | Last match | Starting round | Pld | W | D | L | GF | GA | GD | Win % |
|---|---|---|---|---|---|---|---|---|---|---|---|
| League One | August 2022 | May 2023 | Matchday 1 | 46 | 14 | 16 | 16 | 53 | 51 | +2 | 30.43 |
| FA Cup | November 2022 | March 2023 | First round | 6 | 4 | 1 | 1 | 8 | 4 | +4 | 66.67 |
| EFL Cup | August 2022 | August 2022 | First round | 2 | 1 | 0 | 1 | 1 | 1 | +0 | 50.00 |
| EFL Trophy | August 2022 | October 2022 | Group stage | 3 | 0 | 3 | 0 | 4 | 4 | +0 | 0.00 |
| Total | | | | 57 | 19 | 20 | 18 | 66 | 60 | +6 | 33.33 |

Last updated: pre-season
Source: [ Soccerway]

=== League One ===
==== League table ====
| Pos | Team | Pld | W | D | L | GF | GA | GD | Pts |
|---|---|---|---|---|---|---|---|---|---|
| 10 | Charlton Athletic | 46 | 16 | 14 | 16 | 70 | 66 | +4 | 62 |
| 11 | Lincoln City | 46 | 14 | 20 | 12 | 47 | 47 | 0 | 62 |
| 12 | Shrewsbury Town | 46 | 17 | 8 | 21 | 52 | 61 | −9 | 59 |
| 13 | Fleetwood Town | 46 | 14 | 16 | 16 | 53 | 51 | +2 | 58 |
| 14 | Exeter City | 46 | 15 | 11 | 20 | 64 | 68 | −4 | 56 |
| 15 | Burton Albion | 46 | 15 | 11 | 20 | 57 | 79 | −22 | 56 |
| 16 | Cheltenham Town | 46 | 14 | 12 | 20 | 45 | 61 | −16 | 54 |

Source: EFL Official Website
Rules for classification: 1) Points; 2) Goal difference; 3) Number of goals scored; 4) Head-to-head results; 5) Wins; 6) Away goals; 7) Penalty points (sec 9.5); 8) 12-point sending off offences

==== Results summary ====
| Overall | | | | | | | | Home | | | | | | Away | | | | | |
| Pld | W | D | L | GF | GA | GD | Pts | W | D | L | GF | GA | GD | W | D | L | GF | GA | GD |
|---|---|---|---|---|---|---|---|---|---|---|---|---|---|---|---|---|---|---|---|
| 46 | 14 | 16 | 16 | 53 | 51 | +2 | 58 | 7 | 8 | 8 | 25 | 25 | 0 | 7 | 8 | 8 | 28 | 26 | +2 |

Last updated: 7 May 2023.
Source: [ Soccerway]

==== Results by round ====
| Round | 1 | 2 | 3 | 4 | 5 | 6 | 7 | 8 | 9 | 10 | 11 | 12 | 13 | 14 | 15 | 16 | 17 | 18 | 19 | 20 | 21 | 22 | 23 | 24 | 25 | 26 | 27 | 28 | 29 | 30 | 31 | 32 | 33 | 34 | 35 | 36 | 37 | 38 | 39 | 40 | 41 | 42 | 43 | 44 | 45 | 46 |
|---|---|---|---|---|---|---|---|---|---|---|---|---|---|---|---|---|---|---|---|---|---|---|---|---|---|---|---|---|---|---|---|---|---|---|---|---|---|---|---|---|---|---|---|---|---|---|
| Ground | A | H | A | H | H | A | H | A | H | H | A | A | H | A | H | H | A | A | H | A | A | H | A | A | H | A | H | H | A | H | A | H | H | A | A | H | A | H | H | A | H | A | A | H | A | H |
| Result | L | W | D | D | D | D | D | W | D | L | W | D | L | L | D | W | D | D | L | D | W | L | L | W | L | L | L | L | W | W | D | W | W | L | L | D | W | W | D | L | L | W | D | W | L | D |
| Position | 20 | 9 | 12 | 15 | 14 | 14 | 15 | 12 | 11 | 15 | 12 | 11 | 15 | 16 | 17 | 15 | 15 | 16 | 17 | 18 | 15 | 16 | 17 | 13 | 17 | 17 | 17 | 17 | 17 | 17 | 16 | 13 | 11 | 14 | 14 | 15 | 12 | 13 | 13 | 13 | 15 | 14 | 13 | 12 | 12 | 13 |

Updated to match(es) played on 7 May 2023. Source: [ Soccerway]
A = Away; H = Home; W = Win; D = Draw; L = Loss; P = Postponed

==== Matches ====
Win Draw Loss Fixtures

On 23 June, the league fixtures were announced.

| 30 July 2022 1 | Port Vale | 2–1 | Fleetwood Town | Burslem |
| 15:00 BST | Smith 30', (yellow card) 70'; Hall 32'; McDermott (yellow card) 43'; Ojo (yellow card) 45+1' | Report | Batty 6'; Sarpong-Wiredu (yellow card) 52' | Stadium: Vale Park; Attendance: 8,109; Referee: Peter Wright |

| 6 August 2022 2 | Fleetwood Town | 2–1 | Plymouth Argyle | Fleetwood |
| 15:00 BST | Batty 28'; Garner 88'; Earl (yellow card) 90+7' | Report | Hardie 23' (pen.); Gillesphey (yellow card) 51'; Butcher (yellow card) 53'; Mumba (yellow card) 56'; Scarr (yellow card) 62' | Stadium: Highbury Stadium; Attendance: 3,713; Referee: Robert Lewis |

| 13 August 2022 3 | Morecambe | 1–1 | Fleetwood Town | Morecambe |
| 15:00 BST | Gnahoua 32'; Love (yellow card) 49'; Hunter (yellow card) 69' | Report | Andrew (yellow card) 69', (goal) 83'; Lane (red card) 90+6' | Stadium: Mazuma Stadium; Attendance: 4,288; Referee: Seb Stockbridge |

| 16 August 2022 4 | Fleetwood Town | 0–0 | Cheltenham Town | Fleetwood |
| 19:45 BST | Vela (yellow card) 35'; Andrew (yellow card) 60'; Rooney (yellow card) 68'; Hayes (yellow card) 81'; Earl (yellow card) 90+6'; Garner (yellow card) 90+8' | Report | Nlundulu (yellow card) 36'; Freestone (yellow card) 82'; Adshead (yellow card) 90' | Stadium: Highbury Stadium; Attendance: 2,510; Referee: Andrew Kitchen |

| 20 August 2022 5 | Fleetwood Town | 0–0 | Derby County | Fleetwood |
| 15:00 BST | Rooney (yellow card) 85' | Report | Hourihane (yellow card) 60' | Stadium: Highbury Stadium; Attendance: 3,808; Referee: Ross Joyce |

| 27 August 2022 6 | Lincoln City | 2–2 | Fleetwood Town | Lincoln |
| 15:00 BST | Bishop 6', 14'; Roughan (yellow card) 33'; Hopper (yellow card) 59'; House (yellow card) 62' | Report | Nsiala (yellow card) 30'; Lane 32', (yellow card) 81'; Lynch (yellow card) 59'; Earl (yellow card) 60'; Garner 90+3' | Stadium: LNER Stadium; Attendance: 7,522; Referee: Ollie Yates |

| 3 September 2022 7 | Fleetwood Town | 1–1 | Wycombe Wanderers | Fleetwood |
| 15:00 BST | Muskwe (yellow card) 52', (goal) 67' | Report | McCleary (red card) 10'; Mehmeti 39'; Stryjek (yellow card) 45+3' | Stadium: Highbury Stadium; Attendance: 2,936; Referee: James Oldham |

| 10 September 2022 | Burton Albion | Postponed | Fleetwood Town | Burton upon Trent |
| 15:00 BST | | | | Stadium: Pirelli Stadium |
Note: Fixture was postponed as a mark of respect following the passing of Queen Elizabeth II.

| 13 September 2022 8 | Peterborough United | 0–1 | Fleetwood Town | Peterborough |
| 19:45 BST | N. Thompson (yellow card) 2'; B. Thompson (yellow card) 59'; Taylor (yellow card) 66' | Report | Rooney (yellow card) 11'; Vela 23'; Earl (yellow card) 86' | Stadium: Weston Homes Stadium; Attendance: 6,087; Referee: Will Finnie |

| 17 September 2022 9 | Fleetwood Town | 1–1 | Charlton Athletic | Fleetwood |
| 15:00 BST | Earl (yellow card) 20'; Morton 30' | Report | Leaburn 77'; Morgan (yellow card) 87' | Stadium: Highbury Stadium; Attendance: 3,614; Referee: Simon Mather |

| 24 September 2022 | Oxford United | Postponed | Fleetwood Town | Littlemore |
| 15:00 BST | | | | Stadium: The Kassam Stadium |
Note: Fixture was postponed due to international call-ups.

| 1 October 2022 10 | Fleetwood Town | 0–1 | Barnsley | Fleetwood |
| 15:00 BST | Devlin (yellow card) 24'; Macadam (yellow card) 45'; Warrington (yellow card) 68'; Garner (yellow card) 90+1' | Report | Kane (yellow card) 43'; Aitchison 90' | Stadium: Highbury Stadium; Attendance: 4,024; Referee: Sam Barrott |

| 4 October 2022 11 | Burton Albion | 0–1 | Fleetwood Town | Burton upon Trent |
| 19:45 BST | Oshilaja (yellow card) 19' | Report | Warrington (yellow card) 21'; Macadam 34'; Vela (yellow card) 61' | Stadium: Pirelli Stadium; Attendance: 1,961; Referee: Charles Breakspear |

| 8 October 2022 12 | Portsmouth | 1–1 | Fleetwood Town | Milton |
| 15:00 BST | Koroma 7'; Morrell (yellow card) 65'; Raggett (yellow card) 78' | Report | Rooney (yellow card) 10'; Mendes Gomes 15' (yellow card) 32'; Earl (yellow card) 57'; Batty (yellow card) 83'; Vela (yellow card) 90+2' | Stadium: Fratton Park; Attendance: 18,271; Referee: James Oldham |

| 15 October 2022 13 | Fleetwood Town | 0–1 | Shrewsbury Town | Fleetwood |
| 15:00 BST | Lane (yellow card) 29'; Rooney (yellow card) 52'; Vela (yellow card) 87'; Sarpong-Wiredu (yellow card) 90+1' | Report | Saydee (yellow card) 28'; Bayliss 30' (yellow card) 88'; Maroši (yellow card) 36'; Street (yellow card) 90'; Leahy (yellow card) 90+4' | Stadium: Highbury Stadium; Attendance: 3,091; Referee: Thomas Parsons |

| 22 October 2022 14 | Exeter City | 2–1 | Fleetwood Town | Exeter |
| 15:00 BST | Stansfield 30'; Nombe 90+3' | Report | Mendes Gomes 28'; Hayes (yellow card) 90+1' | Stadium: St James Park; Attendance: 5,834; Referee: Tom Nield |

| 25 October 2022 15 | Fleetwood Town | 1–1 | Forest Green Rovers | Fleetwood |
| 19:45 BST | Holgate (yellow card) 22'; Morton 70'; Andrew (yellow card) 85' | Report | Bunker 23' (yellow card) 36'; Peart-Harris (yellow card) 50' | Stadium: Highbury Stadium; Attendance: 2,370; Referee: Anthony Backhouse |

| 29 October 2022 16 | Fleetwood Town | 3–0 | Accrington Stanley | Fleetwood |
| 15:00 BST | Mendes Gomes (yellow card) 13' (goal) 50'; Rooney 54'; Earl 59' (yellow card) 68'; Sarpong-Wiredu (yellow card) 62' | Report | Whalley (yellow card) 25' | Stadium: Highbury Stadium; Attendance: 3,115; Referee: Geoff Eltringham |

| 1 November 2022 17 | Oxford United | 1–1 | Fleetwood Town | Littlemore |
| 19:45 GMT | Browne (yellow card) 21'; O'Donkor 50'; Seddon (yellow card) 78'; Moore (yellow card) 90+9' | Report | Mendes Gomes 2'; Warrington (yellow card) 21'; Andrew (yellow card) 34'; Batty (yellow card) 45' | Stadium: The Kassam Stadium; Attendance: 6,286; Referee: Alan Young |

| 12 November 2022 18 | Bristol Rovers | 2–2 | Fleetwood Town | Horfield |
| 15:00 GMT | Coburn 57'; Gordon (yellow card) 68'; Collins (yellow card) 75' (goal) 80'; Belshaw (yellow card) 90+1'; Rossiter (yellow card) 90+6' | Report | Rooney 14', 90+9'; Lynch (yellow card) 68'; Batty (yellow card) 73' | Stadium: Memorial Stadium; Attendance: 8,829; Referee: Bobby Madden |

| 19 November 2022 19 | Fleetwood Town | 1–2 | Bolton Wanderers | Fleetwood |
| 15:00 GMT | Mendes Gomes 16'; Rooney (yellow card) 49'; Andrew (yellow card) 53'; Earl (yellow card) 78' | Report | Morley (yellow card) 45'; Bradley (yellow card) 78', (goal) 85'; Afolayan 90+5' (yellow card) 90+6' | Stadium: Highbury Stadium; Attendance: 4,597; Referee: David Webb |

| 2 December 2022 20 | Ipswich Town | 1–1 | Fleetwood Town | Ipswich |
| 19:45 GMT | Woolfenden 2'; Burns (yellow card) 21' | Report | Rooney (yellow card) 5'; Batty (yellow card) 66'; Hayes 90+6'; Earl (red card) 90+6' | Stadium: Portman Road; Attendance: 22,801; Referee: Sam Purkiss |

| 10 December 2022 21 | Milton Keynes Dons | 1–2 | Fleetwood Town | Denbigh |
| 15:00 GMT | O'Hora 52'; Watson (yellow card) 69' | Report | Lynch (yellow card) 70'; Johnston 72'; Batty 90' | Stadium: Stadium:mk; Attendance: 5,672; Referee: Martin Coy |

| 17 December 2022 | Fleetwood Town | Postponed | Cambridge United | Fleetwood |
| 15:00 GMT | | | | Stadium: Highbury Stadium |
Note: Fixture was postponed due to a frozen pitch.

| 26 December 2022 22 | Fleetwood Town | 1–2 | Sheffield Wednesday | Fleetwood |
| 15:00 GMT | Rooney 8', (yellow card) 35' (yellow-red card) 83'; Vela (yellow card) 12' | Report | Byers 16'; McGuinness (yellow card) 45+1'; Johnson 73'; Paterson (yellow card) 90+3' | Stadium: Highbury Stadium; Attendance: 4,389; Referee: Darren Handley |

| 29 December 2022 23 | Barnsley | 2–1 | Fleetwood Town | Barnsley |
| 19:45 GMT | Williams (yellow card) 51'; Norwood 64', (yellow card) 86'; Andersen (yellow card) 73'; Kane (yellow card) 84'; Cundy 86'; Jaló (yellow card) 90+2' | Report | Garner (yellow card) 45'; Muskwe 77' (pen.) | Stadium: Oakwell; Attendance: 10,219; Referee: Ben Speedie |

| 1 January 2023 24 | Shrewsbury Town | 0–3 | Fleetwood Town | Shrewsbury |
| 15:00 GMT | Pennington (red card) 22'; Leahy (yellow card) 24' | Report | Sarpong-Wiredu (yellow card) 24'; Muskwe 25' (pen.); Omochere 28'; Dunkley 89' (o.g.) | Stadium: Montgomery Waters Meadow; Attendance: 5,685; Referee: Ross Joyce |

| 14 January 2023 25 | Fleetwood Town | 1–2 | Oxford United | Fleetwood |
| 15:00 GMT | Sarpong-Wiredu 44'; Nsiala (yellow card) 90+7' | Report | Joseph 62'; Long (yellow card) 72'; Brown 90'; Goodrham (yellow card) 90+5'; Moore (yellow card) 90+7' | Stadium: Highbury Stadium; Attendance: 3,132; Referee: James Oldham |

| 21 January 2023 26 | Sheffield Wednesday | 1–0 | Fleetwood Town | Owlerton |
| 15:00 GMT | Johnson 17'; Palmer (yellow card) 86'; Gregory (penalty missed) 90+5' | Report | Vela (yellow card) 57'; Lynch (yellow card) 90+4' | Stadium: Hillsborough; Referee: Simon Mather |

| 24 January 2023 27 | Fleetwood Town | 0–2 | Portsmouth | Fleetwood |
| 19:45 GMT | Nsiala (yellow card) 47'; Sarpong-Wiredu (yellow card) 63' | Report | Bishop 43', (yellow card) 57'; Morrell (yellow card) 63' (yellow-red card) 68'; Pigott 83'; Swanson (yellow card) 89'; Ogilvie (yellow card) 90+1' | Stadium: Highbury Stadium; Attendance: 2,938; Referee: Carl Boyeson |

| 4 February 2023 28 | Fleetwood Town | 2–3 | Burton Albion | Fleetwood |
| 15:00 GMT | Stockley 58'; Vela (red card) 86'; Omochere 90+4' | Report | Oshilaja 60'; Hamer 80'; Ashworth (yellow card) 90+3'; Kirk 90+6' | Stadium: Highbury Stadium; Attendance: 3,022; Referee: Martin Coy |

| 11 February 2023 29 | Charlton Athletic | 1–2 | Fleetwood Town | Charlton |
| 15:00 GMT | Rak-Sakyi 45+5'; Penney (yellow card) 65'; Fraser (yellow card) 71'; Inniss (red card) 79' | Report | Johnston (yellow card) 20'; Rooney 28', (yellow card) 90+5'; Holgate 52', (yellow card) 90+2'; Sarpong-Wiredu (yellow card) 68'; Macadam (yellow card) 88' | Stadium: The Valley; Attendance: 12,436; Referee: Carl Boyeson |

| 14 February 2023 30 | Fleetwood Town | 1–0 | Peterborough United | Fleetwood |
| 19:45 GMT | Omochere 20'; Mendes Gomes (yellow card) 73'; Lynch (yellow card) 90+3' | Report | Thompson (yellow card) 57'; Knight (yellow card) 90+3' | Stadium: Highbury Stadium; Attendance: 3,037; Referee: Martin Wood |

| 18 February 2023 31 | Plymouth Argyle | 0–0 | Fleetwood Town | Plymouth |
| 15:00 GMT | Miller (yellow card) 85' | Report | Mendes Gomes (yellow card) 64'; Nsiala (yellow card) 74'; Rooney (yellow card) 78'; Macadam (yellow card) 80'; Warrington (yellow card) 82'; Ndaba (yellow card) 90+5' | Stadium: Home Park; Attendance: 16,108; Referee: David Rock |

| 21 February 2023 32 | Fleetwood Town | 1–0 | Cambridge United | Fleetwood |
| 19:45 GMT | Mendes Gomes (yellow card) 34'; Warrington (yellow card) 78'; Rooney 88'; Vela (yellow card) 90+5' | Report | Bennett (yellow card) 44' | Stadium: Highbury Stadium; Attendance: 2,429; Referee: Declan Bourne |

| 25 February 2023 33 | Fleetwood Town | 1–0 | Morecambe | Fleetwood |
| 15:00 GMT | Mendes Gomes 13'; Andrew (yellow card) 80'; Hayes (yellow card) 88' | Report | Shaw (yellow card) 42'; Love (yellow card) 71'; Weir (yellow card) 82' | Stadium: Highbury Stadium; Attendance: 4,550; Referee: Andy Davies |

| 5 March 2023 34 | Cheltenham Town | 1–0 | Fleetwood Town | Cheltenham |
| 15:00 GMT | May 56'; Southwood (yellow card) 90+2' | Report | Warrington (yellow card) 45'; Nsiala (yellow card) 70'; Vela (yellow card) 78' | Stadium: Completely-Suzuki Stadium; Attendance: 3,323; Referee: Sam Allison |

| 7 March 2023 35 | Wycombe Wanderers | 2–0 | Fleetwood Town | High Wycombe |
| 19:45 GMT | Forino-Joseph 4'; Vokes 66' | Report | Nsiala (yellow card) 73' | Stadium: Adams Park; Attendance: 3,560; Referee: Craig Hicks |

| 11 March 2023 36 | Fleetwood Town | 1–1 | Port Vale | Fleetwood |
| 15:00 GMT | Nsiala (yellow card) 69'; Marriott 83' | Report | Taylor 57', (yellow card) 69'; Robinson (yellow card) 69'; Pett (yellow card) 90+3' | Stadium: Highbury Stadium; Attendance: 4,187; Referee: Paul Howard |

| 18 March 2023 37 | Derby County | 0–2 | Fleetwood Town | Derby |
| 15:00 GMT | Davies (yellow card) 45+3'; Knight (yellow card) 74' | Report | Wildsmith 11' (o.g.); Mendes Gomes 30'; Ndaba (yellow card) 50'; Warrington (yellow card) 57'; Stockley (yellow card) 74' | Stadium: Pride Park Stadium; Attendance: 25,476; Referee: Seb Stockbridge |

| 25 March 2023 38 | Fleetwood Town | 2–1 | Lincoln City | Fleetwood |
| 15:00 GMT | Jackson 16' (o.g.); Ndaba (yellow card) 57'; Stockley 73'; Earl (yellow card) 88' | Report | Poole 45+5' | Stadium: Highbury Stadium; Attendance: 3,371; Referee: Declan Bourne |

| 1 April 2023 39 | Fleetwood Town | 2–2 | Exeter City | Fleetwood |
| 15:00 BST | Marriott 18', 35'; Holgate (yellow card) 73' | Report | McDonald 28'; Sweeney 90+1' | Stadium: Highbury Stadium; Attendance: 3,568; Referee: Lewis Smith |

| 7 April 2023 40 | Cambridge United | 2–1 | Fleetwood Town | Cambridge |
| 15:00 BST | Lankester 3'; Smith 57', (yellow card) 69'; McGrandles (yellow card) 90+2'; Mitov (yellow card) 90+4'; Morrison (yellow card) 90+6' | Report | Rooney (yellow card) 68'; Sarpong-Wiredu (yellow card) 69'; Earl (yellow card) 74'; Quitirna 82'; Marriott (yellow card) 90+6' | Stadium: Abbey Stadium; Attendance: 6,279; Referee: Lee Swabey |

| 10 April 2023 41 | Fleetwood Town | 1–2 | Bristol Rovers | Fleetwood |
| 15:00 BST | Stockley 22'; Warrington (yellow card) 27'; Sarpong-Wiredu (yellow card) 48'; Rooney (yellow card) 55' | Report | Collins (yellow card) 21'; Gibson 56'; Ward 66' | Stadium: Highbury Stadium; Attendance: 3,792; Referee: Sam Barrott |

| 15 April 2023 42 | Accrington Stanley | 2–5 | Fleetwood Town | Accrington |
| 15:00 BST | McConville (yellow card) 27'; Coyle (red card) 45+4'; Clark (yellow card) 49'; Nottingham 65'; Leigh 81' | Report | Marriott 9', 35', 90+3'; Robertson (yellow card) 45+1'; Omochere (yellow card) 47', (goal) 57'; Earl (yellow card) 80'; Sarpong-Wiredu (yellow card) 85'; Patterson 90' | Stadium: Wham Stadium; Attendance: 2,624; Referee: Marc Edwards |

| 18 April 2023 43 | Forest Green Rovers | 0–0 | Fleetwood Town | Nailsworth |
| 19:45 BST | Garrick (yellow card) 90' | Report | Rooney (yellow card) 37'; Vela (yellow card) 62'; Stockley (yellow card) 90' | Stadium: The Fully Charged New Lawn; Attendance: 1,716; Referee: Sunny Gill |

| 22 April 2023 44 | Fleetwood Town | 1–0 | Milton Keynes Dons | Fleetwood |
| 15:00 BST | Rooney (yellow card) 43'; Omochere 44'; Nsiala (yellow card) 86' | Report | Watson (yellow card) 75'; Grigg (yellow card) 86'; Kaikai (yellow card) 90+6'; Maghoma (yellow card) 90+8' | Stadium: Highbury Stadium; Attendance: 3,258; Referee: Rebecca Welch |

| 29 April 2023 45 | Bolton Wanderers | 2–0 | Fleetwood Town | Horwich |
| 15:00 BST | Omochere 18' (o.g.); Williams (yellow card) 58'; Lee (yellow card) 64'; Dempsey 78' | Report | Stockley (red card) 58'; Vela (yellow card) 65'; Warrington (yellow card) 67'; Marriott (yellow card) 75' | Stadium: University of Bolton Stadium; Attendance: 20,531; Referee: Ben Speedie |

| 7 May 2023 46 | Fleetwood Town | 2–2 | Ipswich Town | Fleetwood |
| 12:00 GMT | Marriott 57', 69' | Report | Ladapo 50'; Luongo (yellow card) 54'; Harness 73', (yellow card) 75'; Ball (yellow card) 79'; Clarke (yellow card) 85' (yellow-red card) 90+2' | Stadium: Highbury Stadium; Attendance: 4,979; Referee: Ross Joyce |

=== FA Cup ===
Fleetwood were drawn at home to Oxford City in the first round, away to Ebbsfleet United in the second round, at home to Queens Park Rangers in the third round and away to Sheffield Wednesday in the fourth round.

Win Draw Loss Fixtures

| 5 November 2022 First round | Fleetwood Town | 3–1 | Oxford City | Fleetwood |
| 15:00 BST | Warrington 14'; Earl (yellow card) 38'; Lane 44', 84'; Vela (yellow card) 62'; Batty (yellow card) 75' | Report | Coyle (yellow card) 27'; Burley (yellow card) 29'; Potter (yellow card) 64' (goal) 81' | Stadium: Highbury Stadium; Attendance: 1,357; Referee: Aaron Jackson |

| 27 November 2022 Second round | Ebbsfleet United | 0–1 | Fleetwood Town | Northfleet |
| 12:30 GMT | Hollis (yellow card) 90+3' | Report | Garner 64'; Omochere (yellow card) 67' | Stadium: Kuflink Stadium; Attendance: 2,960; Referee: Adam Herczeg |

| 7 January 2023 Third round | Fleetwood Town | 2–1 | Queens Park Rangers | Fleetwood |
| 15:00 GMT | Nsiala 40'; Omochere 67'; Vela (yellow card) 73' | Report | Field 37'; Kakay (yellow card) 65' | Stadium: Highbury Stadium; Attendance: 3,151; Referee: Stephen Martin |

| 28 January 2023 Fourth round | Sheffield Wednesday | 1–1 | Fleetwood Town | Owlerton |
| 15:00 GMT | Vaulks (yellow card) 34'; Earl 71' (o.g.) | Report | Rooney (yellow card) 27'; Omochere 52', (yellow card) 53'; Lane (yellow card) 86'; Robertson (yellow card) 89' | Stadium: Hillsborough; Attendance: 15,743; Referee: Charles Breakspear |

| 7 February 2023 Fourth round replay | Fleetwood Town | 1–0 | Sheffield Wednesday | Fleetwood |
| 19:45 GMT | Mendes Gomes (yellow card) 45', (goal) 60'; Omochere (yellow card) 81'; Hayes (yellow card) 84' | Report | Adeniran (yellow card) 29'; Gregory (yellow card) 42'; Brown (yellow card) 53'; Hunt (yellow card) 67' | Stadium: Highbury Stadium; Attendance: 2,936; Referee: Darren Bond |

| 1 March 2023 Fifth round | Burnley | 1–0 | Fleetwood Town | Burnley |
| 19:30 GMT | Roberts 90' | Report | Andrew (yellow card) 22'; Hayes (red card) 45+1'; Rooney (yellow card) 54'; Vela (yellow card) 90+6' | Stadium: Turf Moor; Attendance: 15,987; Referee: Dean Whitestone |

=== EFL Cup ===
Win Draw Loss Fixtures

Town were drawn at home to Wigan Athletic in the first round and to Everton in the second round.

| 9 August 2022 First round | Fleetwood Town | 1–0 | Wigan Athletic | Fleetwood |
| 19:45 BST | Rooney (yellow card) 10'; Garner 24'; Batty (yellow card) 51' | Report | Nyambe (yellow card) 19'; Shinnie (yellow card) 51'; Hughes (yellow card) 70' | Stadium: Highbury Stadium; Attendance: 1,761; Referee: Michael Salisbury |

| 23 August 2022 Second round | Fleetwood Town | 0–1 | Everton | Fleetwood |
| 19:45 BST | Garner (yellow card) 34'; Andrew (yellow card) 44'; Baker (yellow card) 90+1' | Report | Gray 28'; Vinagre (yellow card) 49' | Stadium: Highbury Stadium; Attendance: 4,267; Referee: Tom Reeves |

=== EFL Trophy ===
On 20 June, the initial Group stage draw was made, grouping Fleetwood Town with Barrow and Carlisle United. Three days later, Manchester United U21s joined Northern Group G.

| Pos | Div | Team | Pld | W | PW | PL | L | GF | GA | GD | Pts | Qualification |
|---|---|---|---|---|---|---|---|---|---|---|---|---|
| 1 | ACA | Manchester United U21 | 3 | 2 | 0 | 1 | 0 | 6 | 4 | +2 | 7 | Advance to Round 2 |
| 2 | L2 | Barrow | 3 | 1 | 1 | 0 | 1 | 4 | 3 | +1 | 5 | Advance to Round 2 |
| 3 | L1 | Fleetwood Town | 3 | 0 | 1 | 2 | 0 | 4 | 4 | 0 | 4 | |
| 4 | L2 | Carlisle United | 3 | 0 | 1 | 0 | 2 | 2 | 5 | −3 | 2 | |

Source: EFL.com

Win Draw Loss Fixtures

| 30 August 2022 Group stage | Fleetwood Town | 1–1 (3–4 p) | Barrow | Fleetwood |
| 19:00 BST | Sarpong-Wiredu 30'; Johnston (yellow card) 43'; Omochere (yellow card) 49' | Report | Rooney 44', (yellow card) 86'; Żuk (yellow card) 72' | Stadium: Highbury Stadium; Attendance: 866; Referee: Thomas Kirk |
| | Penalties |
| | Johnston (penalty missed); McMillan (penalty scored); Omochere (penalty scored); Garner (penalty scored); Glenfield (penalty missed) | | Rooney (penalty scored); Whitfield (penalty scored); Neal (penalty scored); Kenlock (penalty missed); Gotts (penalty scored) |

| 20 September 2022 Group stage | Carlisle United | 1–1 (4–2 p) | Fleetwood Town | Carlisle |
| 19:00 BST | Idehen 90'; Harris (yellow card) 90+6' | Report | Garner 46'; Nsiala (yellow card) 90+6' | Stadium: Brunton Park; Attendance: 1,089; Referee: Rebecca Welch |
| | Penalties |
| | Gibson (penalty missed); Stretton (penalty scored); Whelan (penalty scored); Mellish (penalty scored); Charters (penalty scored) | | Morton (penalty scored); Andrew (penalty scored); Batty (penalty missed); Vela (penalty missed) |

| 18 October 2022 Group stage | Fleetwood Town | 2–2 (5–4 p) | Manchester United U21 | Fleetwood |
| 19:45 BST | Mendes Gomes 63'; Garner 67'; Rooney (yellow card) 89' | Report | McNeill 21' (pen.); Shoretire 90+2' | Stadium: Highbury Stadium; Attendance: 2,287; Referee: Andy Haines |
| | Penalties |
| | Johnston (penalty scored); Garner (penalty scored); Rooney (penalty scored); Lane (penalty scored); Mendes Gomes (penalty missed); Hayes (penalty scored) | | Gómez (penalty scored); Mainoo (penalty scored); Huddlestone (penalty scored); Hugill (penalty missed); Mengi (penalty scored); Shoretire (penalty missed) |
