= Harvey Macadam =

English footballer (born 2001)

Personal information
- Full name: Harvey Jack Nicholas Macadam
- Date of birth: 9 January 2001 (age 25)
- Place of birth: Burnley, England
- Height: 6 ft 4 in (1.93 m)
- Position: Midfielder

Team information
- Current team: Carlisle United
- Number: 37

Youth career
- Fulledge Colts
- Burnley
- Fulledge Colts
- –2017: Blackburn Rovers
- 2017–2018: AFC Fylde

Senior career*
Years	Team	Apps	(Gls)
2018–2019	AFC Fylde	0	(0)
2018–2019	→ Nelson (loan)		
2019	Northwich Victoria		
2019–2020	Nelson	15	(6)
2020	Ashton United	2	(0)
2020	Longridge Town		
2020–2022	Ashton United	21	(0)
2022–2024	Fleetwood Town	37	(2)
2024	→ Waterford (loan)	13	(0)
2024–2025	Morecambe	29	(1)
2025–	Carlisle United	41	(7)
- * Club domestic league appearances and goals as of 18:18, 10 June 2026 (UTC)

Harvey Jack Nicholas Macadam (born 9 January 2001) is an English professional footballer who plays for Carlisle United as a midfielder.

== Career ==
=== Early career ===
Macadam was born in Burnley, Lancashire, and attended Blessed Trinity Roman Catholic College in the town. He was first spotted by his hometown club Burnley whilst playing for Fulledge Colts when he was kicking a ball around the side of the pitch whilst watching his older brother Ewan playing, aged eight or nine. Burnley invited him down for a trial and he subsequently signed for the club, but was later released and went back to playing for Fulledge Colts. Within a month Manchester City, Everton and local rivals Blackburn Rovers came in for him, with him signing for the latter due to logistical reasons. He played at right back or right-wing back for five or six years before he was released by the club at the age of sixteen, failing to earn a scholarship. His father, Nick, believes it was due to his size, as he was only about 5 ft 9ins tall, which made him appear younger than he was. Macadam was instead offered a two-year scholarship at non-league National League side AFC Fylde after trials at Blackpool and Bury. Macadam featured for the under-18 side and was sent out on loan to North West Counties Football League Division One North side Nelson in November 2018 to gain some experience of men's football. He had a further setback when he was not offered a professional deal at the end of his scholarship, due to the Coasters losing the 2019 National League play-off final to Salford City in May 2019, and he was subsequently released for financial reasons.

=== Non-league ===
Following on from his release from AFC Fylde, he signed for Steve Wilkes at North West Counties Football League Premier Division side Northwich Victoria for the 2019–20 campaign. After not playing for a couple of months and Nelson manager, Andy Harrison, had taken a shine to him in his earlier loan spell, so offered him the chance to drop down a division and come to the club for the second half of the season and play. The move was successful and he won the Players' Player and Manager's Player of the Season along with being the second-highest goalscorer. In February 2020, he left Nelson to step-up three divisions to sign for Northern Premier League Premier Division side Ashton United, as Harrison was good friends with manager Michael Clegg, stating that he was too good to be playing in the NWCFL Division One. He only played a couple of games for the Robins before COVID struck and the league was firstly suspended before being declared null and void. In September 2020, it was announced that he had signed permanently for North West Counties Premier Division side Longridge Town, having impressed in pre-season in training and in trial games. He was a part of the side that had a record breaking run in the FA Cup for Longridge, reaching the third qualifying round for the first time. Macadam re-joined Clegg at Ashton in October 2020 and made five appearances, scoring against York City in the FA Trophy, before the season was again curtailed due to Covid. He committed again for Ashton United for the 2021–22 season in the Northern Premier League, becoming a regular in the side, drawing interest from EFL League One side Fleetwood Town in October 2021.

=== Fleetwood Town ===
On 2 January 2022, he signed for Fleetwood Town for an undisclosed fee on a two-and-a-half-year deal, signing his first ever professional contract. He scored his first goal for the club, on his full debut, on 2 April 2022.

==== Waterford loan ====
On 22 February 2024, Macadam signed for League of Ireland Premier Division club Waterford on loan.

=== Morecambe ===
On 18 July 2024, Macadam signed for fellow League Two club Morecambe on a one-year deal with the option for a further twelve months.

=== Carlisle United ===
On 9 August 2025, Macadam signed a one-year deal (with an option for a further year) with National League club Carlisle United, and made his debut three hours later in the side's 2–0 win at Woking.

== Career statistics ==
As of match played 18 October 2025

Appearances and goals by club, season and competition
Club	Season	League			National cup		League cup		Other		Total	
Club	Season	Division	Apps	Goals	Apps	Goals	Apps	Goals	Apps	Goals	Apps	Goals
Nelson	2019–20	NWCFL Division One North	15	6	—		—		1 (Note: Appearance in the Lancashire FA Challenge Trophy.)	0	16	6
Ashton United	2019–20	NPL Premier Division	2	0	—		—		—		2	0
Ashton United	2020–21	NPL Premier Division	2	0	0	0	—		3 (Note: Appearances in the FA Trophy.)	1	5	1
Ashton United	2021–22	NPL Premier Division	19	0	1	0	—		5 (Note: 3 appearances and 1 goal in the FA Trophy; 2 appearances in the Manchester Premier Cup)	1	25	1
Ashton United	Total		21	0	1	0	0	0	8	1	30	1
Fleetwood Town	2021–22	League One	10	1	0	0	0	0	0	0	10	1
Fleetwood Town	2022–23	League One	25	1	3	0	2	0	0	0	30	1
Fleetwood Town	2023–24	League One	2	0	0	0	0	0	1 (Note: Appearance(s) in the EFL Trophy)	0	3	0
Fleetwood Town	Total		37	2	3	0	2	0	1	0	43	2
Waterford (loan)	2024	League of Ireland Premier Division	13	0	0	0	0	0	0	0	13	0
Morecambe	2024–25	League Two	29	1	3	0	1	0	3	1	36	2
Carlisle United	2025–26	National League	12	1	0	0	0	0	0	0	12	1
Career total			129	10	7	0	3	0	13	3	152	13
