= Lewis Warrington (footballer) =

English footballer (born 2002)

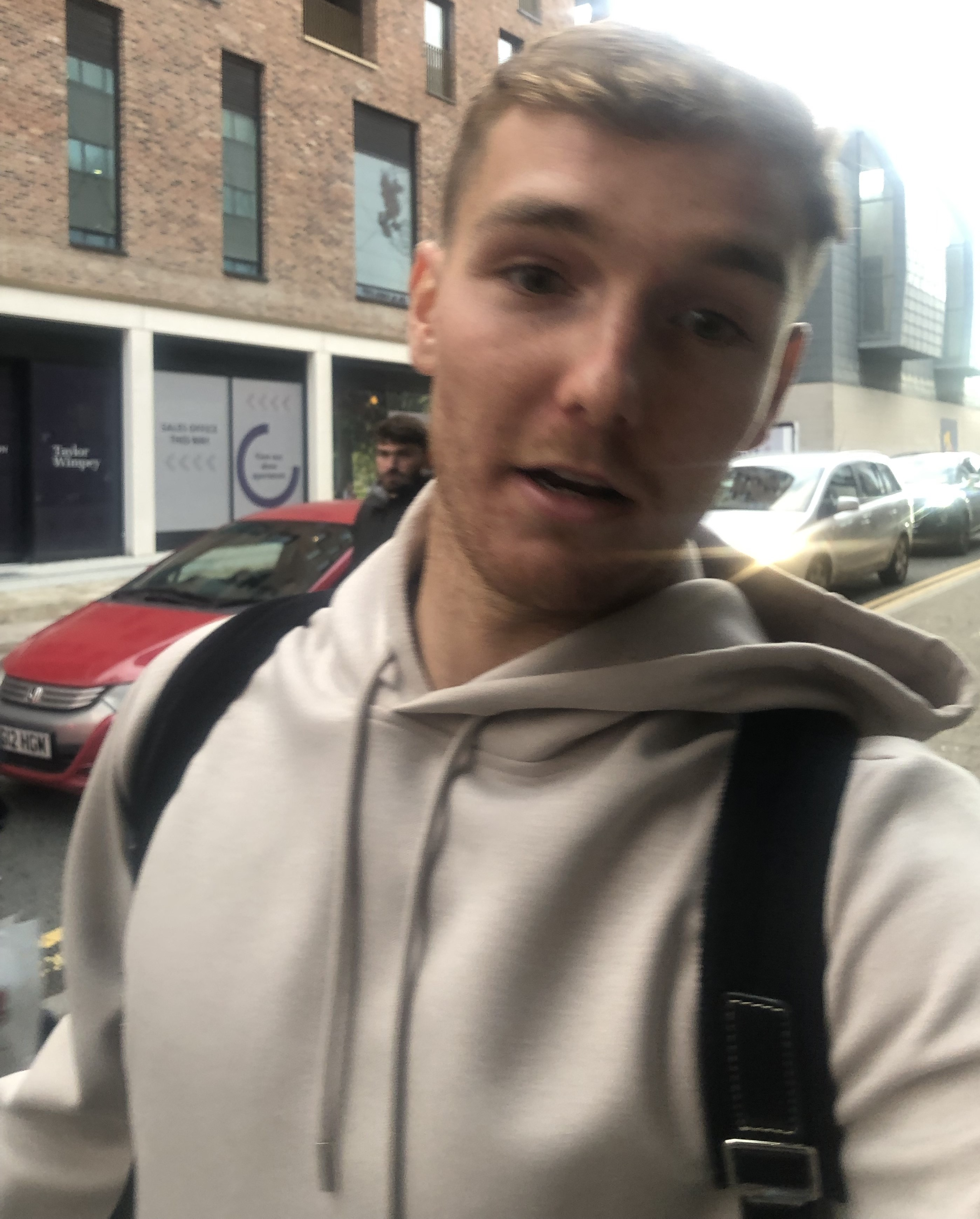
- Warrington in 2024

Personal information
- Full name: Lewis Wesley Warrington
- Date of birth: 10 October 2002 (age 24)
- Place of birth: Birkenhead, England
- Height: 1.82 m (6 ft 0 in)
- Position: Defensive midfielder

Team information
- Current team: Tranmere Rovers
- Number: 25

Youth career
- 2008–2022: Everton

Senior career*
Years	Team	Apps	(Gls)
2022–2024	Everton	1	(0)
2022	→ Tranmere Rovers (loan)	17	(1)
2022–2023	→ Fleetwood Town (loan)	38	(0)
2023–2024	→ Plymouth Argyle (loan)	2	(0)
2024–2025	Leyton Orient	8	(0)
2025	→ Salford City (loan)	16	(1)
2025–2026	Walsall	18	(0)
2026–	Tranmere Rovers	9	(0)
- * Club domestic league appearances and goals as of 21:04, 10 November 2026 (UTC)

Lewis Wesley Warrington (born 10 October 2002) is an English professional footballer who plays as a defensive midfielder for EFL League Two club Tranmere Rovers.

== Career ==
=== Everton ===
Warrington began his career at Everton, joining the club at the age of six. In January 2022, he joined League Two side Tranmere Rovers on loan. Following the loan deal, he signed a new two-year contract. On 23 August 2022, he made his senior debut for Everton as a substitute in a 1–0 win over Fleetwood Town in the EFL Cup.

He moved on loan to Fleetwood Town on 1 September 2022.

On 26 July 2023 he moved on a season long loan to Championship side Plymouth Argyle. Having made only four appearances across the first half of the season, he returned to Everton in January 2024.

Warrington made his Premier League debut for Everton when he came on as a substitute in a 1-0 win over Sheffield United at Goodison Park on 11 May 2024.

On 4 June 2024, Everton announced that Warrington would depart the club upon the expiration of his contract.

=== Leyton Orient ===
On 16 July 2024, Warrington joined League One side Leyton Orient on a two-year contract.

On 23 January 2025, Warrington joined League Two side Salford City on loan for the remainder of the season.

=== Walsall ===
On 1 August 2025, Warrington joined League Two side Walsall on a two-year deal.

=== Tranmere Rovers ===
On 1 February 2026, Warrington returned to League Two club Tranmere Rovers on a two-and-a-half year deal.

== Career statistics ==
As of match played 10 November 2026

Appearances and goals by club, season and competition
Club	Season	League			FA Cup		League Cup		Other		Total	
Club	Season	Division	Apps	Goals	Apps	Goals	Apps	Goals	Apps	Goals	Apps	Goals
Everton U23	2021–22	—			—		—		3 (Note: Appearance(s) in EFL Trophy)	0	3	0
Everton U23	2022–23	—			—		—		1	0	1	0
Everton U23	Total				—		—		4	0	4	0
Everton	2021–22	Premier League	0	0	0	0	0	0	—		0	0
Everton	2022–23	Premier League	0	0	0	0	1	0	—		1	0
Everton	2023–24	Premier League	1	0	0	0	0	0	—		1	0
Everton	Total		1	0	0	0	1	0	0	0	2	0
Tranmere Rovers (loan)	2021–22	League Two	17	1	0	0	0	0	0	0	17	1
Fleetwood Town (loan)	2022–23	League One	38	0	6	1	0	0	0	0	44	1
Plymouth Argyle (loan)	2023–24	Championship	2	0	0	0	2	0	—		4	0
Leyton Orient	2024–25	League One	8	0	0	0	3	0	2	0	13	0
Salford City (loan)	2024–25	League Two	16	1	0	0	0	0	0	0	16	1
Walsall	2025–26	League Two	18	0	0	0	0	0	2	0	20	0
Tranmere Rovers	2025–26	League Two	9	0	0	0	0	0	0	0	9	0
Tranmere Rovers	2026–27	League Two	0	0	0	0	1	0	2	0	3	0
Tranmere Rovers	Total		9	0	0	0	1	0	2	0	12	0
Career total			109	2	6	1	7	0	10	0	132	3
