= Dylan Boyle =

English footballer

Personal information
- Full name: Dylan Michael Boyle
- Date of birth: 15 January 2002 (age 24)
- Place of birth: Belfast, Northern Ireland
- Height: 1.72 m (5 ft 7 1/2 in)
- Position: Midfielder

Team information
- Current team: Coleriane

Youth career
- 2018–2020: Fleetwood Town

Senior career*
Years	Team	Apps	(Gls)
2018–	Fleetwood Town	10	(0)
2020–2021	→ F.C. United of Manchester (loan)	0	(0)
2021	→ Bamber Bridge (loan)	14	(0)
2022–2023	→ Spennymoor Town (loan)	13	(1)
2023–	→ Curzon Ashton (loan)	15	(0)

International career
2018–2019	Northern Ireland U17	5	(0)
2019	Northern Ireland U19	1	(0)
2021–	Northern Ireland U21	5	(0)
- * Club domestic league appearances and goals as of 20:34, 27 April 2023 (UTC)

Dylan Michael Boyle (born 15 January 2002) is a Northern Irish professional footballer who plays for Curzon Ashton on loan from Fleetwood Town, as a midfielder.

== Career ==
Boyle started his career playing youth football for his local side in Belfast, Ridgeway Rovers, where he spent five years before moving across to England to sign a scholarship for the youth team of EFL League One side Fleetwood Town. In January 2020, he signed his first professional contract for the club at the age of seventeen, after impressing the under-18's manager, Simon Wiles. Boyle was captain of the side and had already made his first team debut for Fleetwood in the EFL Trophy defeat to Leicester City U21 in September 2018, having replaced Chris Long as a late substitute.

On 18 December 2020, he was sent out on loan to Northern Premier League Premier Division side F.C. United of Manchester on an initial one-month youth loan. On 13 August 2021, he was again sent out on loan to the Northern Premier League Premier Division, signing for Bamber Bridge. He returned from the club on 28 October 2021, having made fifteen appearances, only missing games when he was representing Northern Ireland U21. Brig First Team Manager, Jamie Milligan, was impressed with Boyle and stated "Dylan has been a pleasure to coach and I'm sure he will go onto big things.

He made his first senior start for Fleetwood against Bolton Wanderers defeat in the EFL Trophy on 30 November 2021, praising interim manager after the match, Stephen Crainey, who had also been his manager for the under-23s in the previous couple of years. He signed a new contract with the club on 31 December 2021, committing to the club on a one-year extension until June 2023, with the club holding an option for a further year.

On 21 October 2022, Boyle joined National League North club Spennymoor Town on a one-month loan deal. In February 2023, he joined Curzon Ashton on loan until the end of the season.

== International career ==
Boyle has represented Northern Ireland at under-17, under-19 and under-21 levels.

== Career statistics ==
As of match played 22 April 2023

Appearances and goals by club, season and competition
Club	Season	League			FA Cup		League Cup		Other		Total	
Club	Season	Division	Apps	Goals	Apps	Goals	Apps	Goals	Apps	Goals	Apps	Goals
Fleetwood Town	2018–19	League One	0	0	0	0	0	0	1 (Note: Appearances in the EFL Trophy.)	0	1	0
Fleetwood Town	2019–20	League One	0	0	0	0	0	0	0	0	0	0
Fleetwood Town	2020–21	League One	0	0	0	0	0	0	1	0	1	0
Fleetwood Town	2021–22	League One	10	0	—		0	0	1	0	11	0
Fleetwood Town	2022–23	League One	0	0	0	0	0	0	2	0	2	0
Fleetwood Town	Total		10	0	0	0	0	0	5	0	15	0
Bamber Bridge (loan)	2021–22	NPL Premier Division	14	0	1	0	—		—		15	0
Spennymoor Town (loan)	2022–23	National League North	13	1	—		—		2 (Note: Appearances in the FA Trophy.)	0	15	1
Curzon Ashton (loan)	2022–23	National League North	15	0	—		—		—		15	0
Career total			52	1	1	0	0	0	7	0	60	1
