= Gerard Garner =

English footballer (born 1998)

- Garner (left) warming up for Newport County

Personal information
- Full name: Gerard Garner
- Date of birth: 2 November 1998 (age 28)
- Place of birth: Liverpool, England
- Height: 1.88 m (6 ft 2 in)
- Position: Forward

Team information
- Current team: Newport County
- Number: 19

Youth career
- –2017: Fleetwood Town

Senior career*
Years	Team	Apps	(Gls)
2017–2023	Fleetwood Town	60	(11)
2017	→ Southport (loan)	0	(0)
2017	→ Bamber Bridge (loan)		
2018	→ FC United of Manchester (loan)	6	(3)
2020	→ Gateshead (loan)	8	(3)
2023–2025	Barrow	50	(7)
2024	→ Morecambe (loan)	16	(4)
2025	→ Morecambe (loan)	8	(2)
2025–	Newport County	34	(3)
- * Club domestic league appearances and goals as of 22:01, 3 November 2026 (UTC)

Gerard Garner (born 2 November 1998) is an English professional footballer who plays as a forward for EFL League Two club Newport County.

Garner began his career with Fleetwood Town, spending loan spells in non-league at Southport, Bamber Bridge, FC United of Manchester and Gateshead. He moved to Barrow in January 2023 for a club record fee, moving on loan to Morecambe in January 2024 and again in February 2025.

== Early life ==
Born in Liverpool, Garner attended Our Lady & St Swithin's Primary School in Croxteth.

== Career ==
As an 11 year old Garner scored 76 goals in a season, breaking a record previously held by Wayne Rooney.

Beginning his career with Fleetwood Town, Garner spent loan spells at Southport in August 2017, Bamber Bridge in November 2017, and FC United of Manchester in March 2018.

On 25 October 2020, Garner joined National League North club Gateshead on a loan deal until December 2020. On 4 December 2020, the loan deal was extended until January 2021.

On 31 January 2023, Garner signed for League Two club Barrow for a club-record transfer fee on a two-and-a-half-year deal.

In January 2024 he moved on loan to Morecambe. He returned on loan to Morecambe in February 2025.

On 7 May 2025, Barrow announced the player would be leaving in June when his contract expired.

Garner signed a two year contract with Newport County on 19 June 2025, with effect from 1 July 2025. He made his debut for Newport in the EFL Cup preliminary round win against Barnet on 29 July 2025. Garner scored his first goal for Newport on 2 August 2025 in the EFL League Two 1-1 draw against Notts County, on his league debut.

== Career statistics ==
As of match played 3 November 2026

Appearances and goals by club, season and competition
Club	Season	League			FA Cup		EFL Cup		Other		Total	
Club	Season	Division	Apps	Goals	Apps	Goals	Apps	Goals	Apps	Goals	Apps	Goals
Fleetwood Town	2017–18	League One	0	0	0	0	0	0	0	0	0	0
Fleetwood Town	2018–19	League One	1	0	1	1	0	0	3 (Note: Appearance(s) in EFL Trophy)	0	5	1
Fleetwood Town	2019–20	League One	0	0	1	0	0	0	2	0	3	0
Fleetwood Town	2020–21	League One	17	3	0	0	1	0	2	0	20	3
Fleetwood Town	2021–22	League One	28	7	1	0	0	0	2	1	31	8
Fleetwood Town	2022–23	League One	14	1	3	1	2	1	1	0	20	3
Fleetwood Town	Total		60	11	6	2	3	1	10	1	79	15
Southport (loan)	2017–18	National League North	0	0	—		—		—		0	0
FC United of Manchester (loan)	2017–18	National League North	6	3	—		—		—		6	3
Gateshead (loan)	2020–21	National League North	8	3	—		—		1 (Note: Appearance in FA Trophy)	1	9	4
Barrow	2022–23	League Two	16	2	0	0	0	0	0	0	16	2
Barrow	2023–24	League Two	18	2	2	0	1	0	2	0	23	2
Barrow	2024–25	League Two	16	3	1	0	3	1	2	0	22	4
Barrow	Total		50	7	3	0	4	1	4	0	61	8
Morecambe (loan)	2023–24	League Two	16	4	0	0	0	0	0	0	16	4
Morecambe (loan)	2024–25	League Two	8	2	0	0	0	0	0	0	8	2
Newport County	2025–26	League Two	25	2	2	0	1	0	1	0	29	2
Newport County	2026–27	League Two	9	1	0	0	1	0	3	1	13	2
Newport County	Total		34	3	2	0	2	0	4	1	42	4
Career total			182	33	11	2	9	2	19	3	221	41
