= Cian Hayes =

Irish footballer

Personal information
- Full name: Cian Jude Hayes
- Date of birth: 21 June 2003 (age 23)
- Place of birth: Preston, England
- Height: 1.73 m (5 ft 8 in)
- Position: Winger

Team information
- Current team: Rochdale
- Number: 7

Youth career
- –2019: Fleetwood Town

Senior career*
Years	Team	Apps	(Gls)
2019–2024	Fleetwood Town	68	(2)
2021	→ FC United of Manchester (loan)	4	(2)
2023	→ Rochdale (loan)	8	(2)
2024	→ Rochdale (loan)	16	(5)
2024–2026	Peterborough United	54	(6)
2026–	Rochdale	0	(0)

International career^{‡}
2021–2022	Republic of Ireland U19	5	(1)
- * Club domestic league appearances and goals as of 22:09, 10 February 2026 (UTC) ‡ National team caps and goals as of 22:49, 9 September 2023 (UTC)

Cian Jude Hayes (born 21 June 2003) is a professional footballer who plays as a winger for EFL League Two club Rochdale. Born in England, he is a youth international for Ireland.

== Club career ==
=== Fleetwood Town ===
On 13 November 2019, Hayes made his debut for Fleetwood Town in a 5–2 EFL Trophy win against Oldham Athletic, becoming Fleetwood's youngest ever player in the process. He signed his first professional contract in January 2021 with a deal lasting until the end of the 2022–23 season. Cian Hayes scored a 45-yard screamer, the winning goal, against Shrewbury in a youth alliance league game to win the league for Fleetwood Town u18s, they celebrated the win of the league against Salford the week after were Hayes scored 4 goals when they won 4-1 and went on to lift the trophy in front of 2000 fans.

==== FC United of Manchester (loan) ====
On 22 October 2021, Fleetwood Town announced that Hayes had joined Northern Premier League side FC United of Manchester on a one-month loan. His league debut in senior football came a day later as he scored to make it 2–0 in an eventual 3–2 win over Witton Albion at Wincham Park. Hayes scored on his final appearance for FC United on 27 November 2021 in a 2–0 win over Mickleover. He made a total of 4 appearances during his time with the club, scoring twice.

==== Rochdale (loan) ====
On 5 October 2023, Fleetwood sent Hayes on a one-month loan to National League side Rochdale Having had his loan spell extended by a further month, he was recalled by his parent club on 28 November 2023. On 1 February 2024 he returned to the club on loan until the end of the season.

=== Peterborough United ===
On 3 July 2024, Hayes signed for EFL League One side Peterborough United on a three-year deal.

Following the conclusion of the 2025–26 season, the club announced that Hayes had been transfer listed.

==== Rochdale ====
On 2 July 2026, Hayes signed for EFL League Two side Rochdale on a three-year deal for an undisclosed fee.

== International career ==
On 4 October 2021, Hayes was called up to the Republic of Ireland U19 squad for the first time, for their double header of friendlies against Sweden U19 in Marbella, Spain. He made his underage international debut on 11 October 2021 in a 1–1 draw with Sweden. He scored his first international goal on 29 March 2022, scoring in a 4–0 win over Armenia U19 in a 2022 UEFA European Under-19 Championship qualifying Elite round game, on what was his 5th cap for the side.

== Career statistics ==
As of match played 7 February 2026

Appearances and goals by club, season and competition
Club	Season	League			FA Cup		League Cup		Other		Total	
Club	Season	Division	Apps	Goals	Apps	Goals	Apps	Goals	Apps	Goals	Apps	Goals
Fleetwood Town	2019–20	League One	0	0	0	0	0	0	1 (Note: Appearance(s) in EFL Trophy)	0	1	0
Fleetwood Town	2020–21	League One	0	0	0	0	0	0	1	0	1	0
Fleetwood Town	2021–22	League One	24	1	0	0	0	0	3	0	27	1
Fleetwood Town	2022–23	League One	34	1	6	0	2	0	3	0	45	1
Fleetwood Town	2023–24	League One	10	0	—		1	1	0	0	11	1
Fleetwood Town	Total		68	2	6	0	3	1	8	0	85	3
FC United of Manchester (loan)	2021–22	NPL Premier Division	4	2	—		—		—		4	2
Rochdale (loan)	2023–24	National League	8	2	1	0	—		0	0	9	2
Rochdale (loan)	2023–24	National League	16	5	0	0	—		0	0	16	5
Peterborough United	2024–25	League One	34	3	2	0	1	0	6	1	43	4
Peterborough United	2025–26	League One	19	3	0	0	1	0	1	0	21	3
Peterborough United	Total		53	6	2	0	2	0	7	1	64	7
Career total			149	17	9	0	5	1	15	1	178	19

== Honours ==
Peterborough United

- EFL Trophy: 2024–25
