= Paddy Lane (footballer) =

Footballer (born 2001)

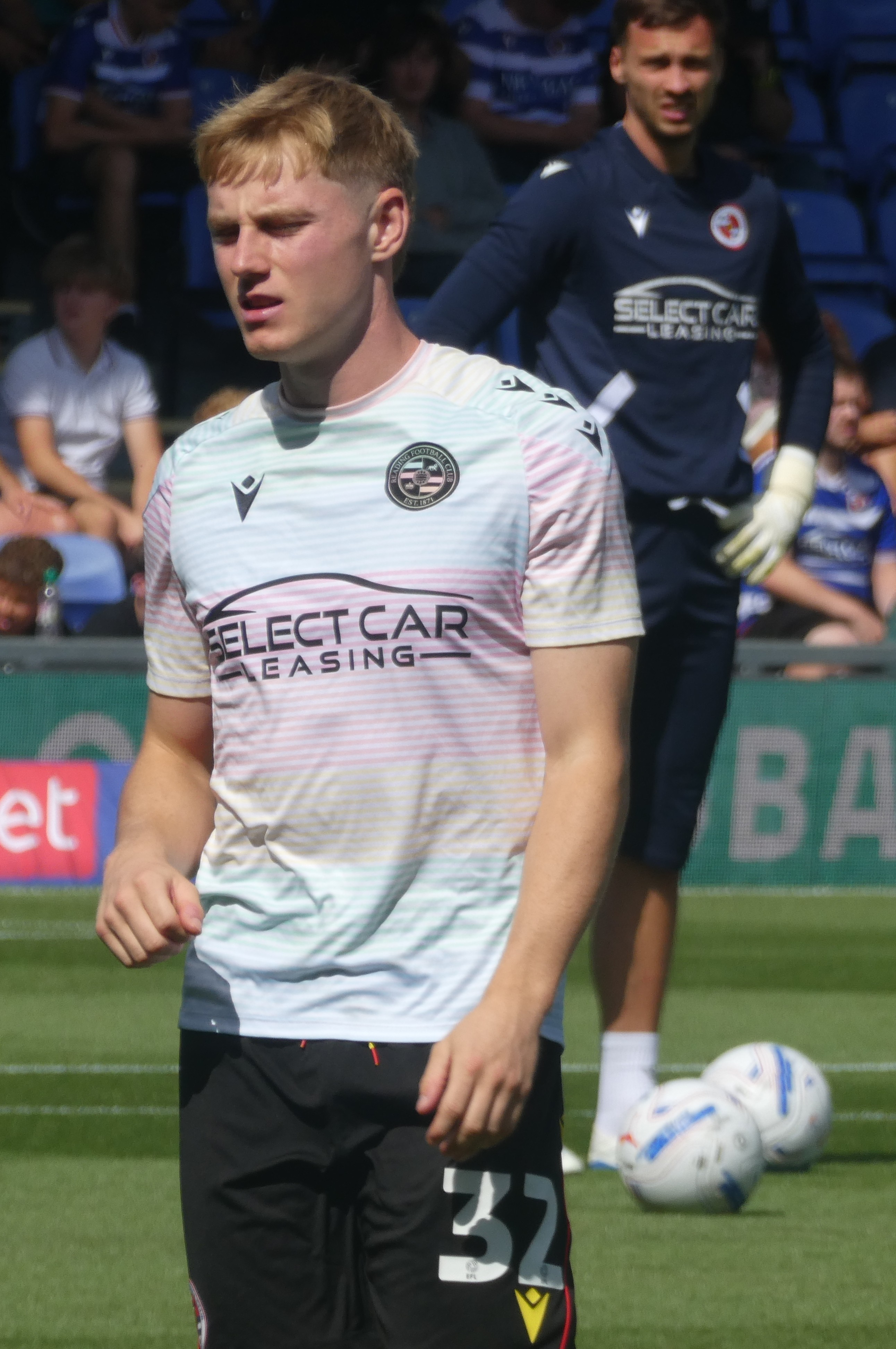
- Lane with Reading in 2026

Personal information
- Full name: Patrick John Lane
- Date of birth: 18 February 2001 (age 25)
- Place of birth: Halifax, England
- Height: 1.78 m (5 ft 10 in)
- Position: Winger

Team information
- Current team: Reading
- Number: 32

Youth career
- Blackburn Rovers
- –2018: Hyde United

Senior career*
Years	Team	Apps	(Gls)
2018–2021	Hyde United	53	(8)
2020	→ Farsley Celtic (loan)	5	(0)
2020–2021	→ Farsley Celtic (loan)	4	(0)
2021–2023	Fleetwood Town	57	(6)
2023–2025	Portsmouth	79	(14)
2025–	Reading	43	(3)

International career^{‡}
2021	Northern Ireland U21	6	(1)
2022–	Northern Ireland	4	(0)
- * Club domestic league appearances and goals as of 22 October 2026 (UTC) ‡ National team caps and goals as of 13:05, 3 June 2022 (UTC)

Patrick John Lane (born 18 February 2001) is a professional footballer who plays as a winger for EFL League One club Reading.

== Club career ==
Having previously played for Blackburn Rovers at youth level, Lane came through Hyde United's youth academy, and started his senior career at the club. He joined Farsley Celtic of the National League North on a one-month loan in November 2020, and returned to the club on a second month-long loan the following month.

He made 9 appearances across his two loan spells at Farsley Celtic. Having scored 13 goals in 67 appearances in all competitions for Hyde United, Lane signed for EFL League One club Fleetwood Town on a two-year deal for an undisclosed fee in summer 2021.

He made his debut for the club on 11 September 2021 as a substitute in a 4–2 win away to Rotherham United, and scored his first goal for the club on 25 September when he "cut inside and fired a fine finish into the far corner" to equalise in a 2–2 draw with Cambridge United. He was named in the club's starting line-up for their following match on 28 September – a 1–1 draw with Milton Keynes Dons.

In December 2021, he signed a new contract with the club until the summer of 2024, with the option to extend the contract by a year. After two goals and an assist in January 2022, he was nominated for the EFL League One Player of the Month award for that month, but lost to Michael Smith of Rotherham United. Lane ended his first season in professional football by winning the EFL League One Young Player of the Year award. He was also awarded the Fleetwood Town Supporters' Player of the Year Award.

In January 2023 Lane joined Portsmouth. He scored his first goal for the club on 7 May 2023 against Wycombe Wanderers. Lane was a key member of the side that won promotion to the Championship in 2023/4, however found his playing time reduced in the Championship.

In 2025, Lane joined Reading for an undisclosed fee.

== International career ==
Born in Halifax, West Yorkshire, England, Lane was eligible to play for England, Wales, Republic of Ireland and Northern Ireland through heritage. Lane has represented Northern Ireland six times at under-21 level, scoring once.

Lane was called up to the senior Northern Ireland squad in March 2022. Lane made his senior international debut on 29 March in a 1–0 defeat to Hungary, starting the game in left-wing-back position.

== Style of play ==
Lane plays as a winger.

== Career statistics ==
=== Club ===
As of 1 January 2025

Appearances and goals by club, season and competition
Club	Season	League			FA Cup		EFL Cup		Other		Total	
Club	Season	Division	Apps	Goals	Apps	Goals	Apps	Goals	Apps	Goals	Apps	Goals
Hyde United	2018–19	NPL Premier Division	19	2	0	0	—		0	0	19	2
Hyde United	2019–20	NPL Premier Division	28	4	1	0	—		9 (Note: One appearance and one goal in FA Trophy, three appearances and one goal in Cheshire Senior Cup, two appearances and one goal in Manchester Premier Cup, three appearances in NPL League Challenge Cup)	4	38	8
Hyde United	2020–21	NPL Premier Division	6	2	2	1	—		2 (Note: Appearance(s) in FA Trophy)	0	10	3
Hyde United	Total		53	8	3	1	—		11	4	67	13
Farsley Celtic (loan)	2020–21	National League North	9	0	—		—		—		9	0
Fleetwood Town	2021–22	League One	37	5	1	0	0	0	0	0	38	5
Fleetwood Town	2022–23	League One	20	1	4	2	1	0	1 (Note: Appearance(s) in EFL Trophy)	0	26	3
Fleetwood Town	Total		57	6	5	2	1	0	1	0	64	8
Portsmouth	2022–23	League One	15	1	0	0	0	0	0	0	15	1
Portsmouth	2023–24	League One	42	12	1	0	1	0	1	0	45	12
Portsmouth	2024–25	EFL Championship	22	1	1	0	1	0	—		24	1
Portsmouth	Total		79	14	2	0	2	0	1	0	84	14
Reading	2025–26	League One	34	2	1	0	2	0	1	0	38	2
Reading	2026–27	League One	11	2	0	0	3	1	1	0	13	2
Reading	Total		43	3	1	0	5	1	2	0	51	4
Career total			241	31	11	3	8	1	15	4	275	39

=== International ===
As of match played 29 March 2022

Appearances and goals by national team and year
National team	Year	Apps	Goals
Northern Ireland	2022	1	0
Northern Ireland	2023	2	0
Northern Ireland	2024	1	0
Total		4	0

== Honours ==
Portsmouth

- EFL League One: 2023–24

Individual

- EFL League One Young Player of the Year: 2021–22
- Fleetwood Town Supporters' Player of the Year: 2021–22
