= Aristote Nsiala =

Congolese footballer (born 1992)

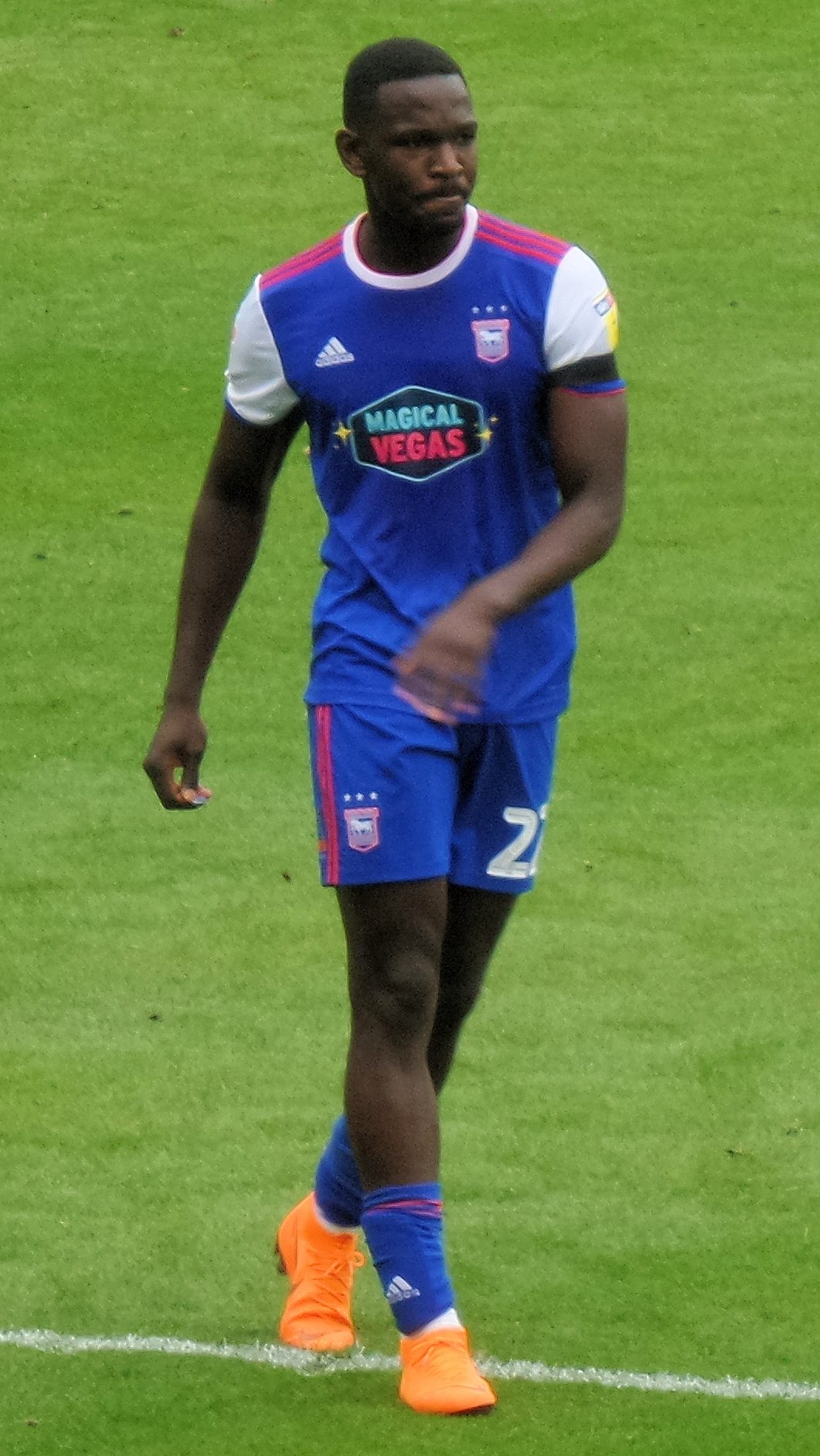
- Nsiala on his Ipswich Town debut in 2018

Personal information
- Full name: Aristote Nsiala
- Date of birth: 25 March 1992 (age 34)
- Place of birth: Kinshasa, Zaire
- Height: 1.93 m (6 ft 4 in)
- Position: Centre back

Team information
- Current team: Bury

Youth career
- 2007–2009: Everton

Senior career*
| Years | Team | Apps | (Gls) |
| 2009–2012 | Everton | 0 | (0) |
| 2010–2011 | → Macclesfield Town (loan) | 10 | (0) |
| 2011–2012 | → Accrington Stanley (loan) | 19 | (0) |
| 2012–2013 | Accrington Stanley | 17 | (0) |
| 2013–2014 | Southport | 19 | (1) |
| 2014–2016 | Grimsby Town | 79 | (1) |
| 2016–2017 | Hartlepool United | 21 | (1) |
| 2017–2018 | Shrewsbury Town | 65 | (4) |
| 2018–2022 | Ipswich Town | 63 | (1) |
| 2019–2020 | → Bolton Wanderers (loan) | 12 | (0) |
| 2022–2023 | Fleetwood Town | 67 | (0) |
| 2024 | Burton Albion | 11 | (1) |
| 2024–2025 | Shrewsbury Town | 23 | (1) |
| 2026– | Bury | 2 | (0) |

International career^{‡}
| 2012 | DR Congo | 1 | (0) |
- * Club domestic league appearances and goals as of 14:27, 22 May 2026 (UTC) ‡ National team caps and goals as of 17:54, 15 March 2019 (UTC)

Aristote Nsiala (born 25 March 1992) is a Congolese professional footballer who plays as a centre back. He has also represented DR Congo at international level.

After graduating from the youth academy of Everton in 2009, Nsiala spent time on loan at Macclesfield Town and Accrington Stanley, before joining Accrington Stanley permanently in May 2012. He was released by Accrington in January 2013. He joined Southport in January 2014, before joining Grimsby Town in June 2014. After winning the 2016 National League play-off final he joined Hartlepool United, staying there for six months before a switch to Shrewsbury Town. Following defeat in the 2018 EFL League One play-off final he signed for Ipswich Town.

== Early life ==
Nsiala was born in Kinshasa in 1992, but moved to Paris with his mother and four siblings when he was three years old. He and his family moved again in 2002, to Liverpool. He began his football career playing for youth side Kingsley United in Toxteth, and was recruited by Everton's youth academy in 2007.

== Club career ==
=== Everton ===
Nsiala rose through the ranks of Everton's youth system, and featured for the reserve team from 2009 onwards. He was an unused substitute for the Everton first-team in a UEFA Europa League dead rubber against BATE Borisov on 17 December 2009.

He was an unused sub in the Premier League clash with Aston Villa at Goodison Park on 31 March 2011, and said that "[during] the last few minutes when I was told to get stripped off, I actually nearly wet myself!" In May 2011, he signed a new one-year contract with Everton.

==== Macclesfield Town (loan) ====
On 8 October 2010, Nsiala joined League Two club Macclesfield Town for a one-month-long youth loan, and made his debut the following day in a 2–1 away defeat to Lincoln City. His loan at Macclesfield was extended by a further two months by "Silkmen" boss Gary Simpson, and he made 13 appearances and scored one goal during his stay at Moss Rose. He scored his first goal in senior football on 16 November when he scored the opening goal of a 2–2 draw with Southend United in the FA Cup.

=== Accrington Stanley ===
Nsiala was loaned out to League Two club Accrington Stanley on 6 January 2012, signing an initial one-month loan deal, which was later extended until the end of the 2011–12 season.

Released by Everton, he signed for Paul Cook's Accrington Stanley in May 2012 on a one-year deal. He made twenty appearances for Accrington in the 2012–13 season, his contract was terminated by mutual consent on 10 January 2013 after he fell out of new manager Leam Richardson's first team plans.

=== Free agent ===
He joined Torquay United on trial in July 2013, but failed to earn a contract. He also had trials at Dundee United and Partick Thistle, but was not offered a contract with either club. While on holiday in Vietnam, he briefly played for Vietnamese clubs Ha Noi FC and TDCS Dong Thap in the V.League 2.

=== Southport ===
Nsiala signed for Southport in January 2014, in a move that reunited him with John Coleman, his former manager at Accrington. He scored his first goal for the Sandgrounders on 15 March, in a 4–1 win over former club Macclesfield Town at Haig Avenue. He ended the 2013–14 season with 19 appearances to his name, helping Southport to finish two points above the relegation zone.

=== Grimsby Town ===
On 12 June 2014, Nsiala signed for Conference Premier side Grimsby Town on a one-year contract. He made his debut in the 0–0 stalemate to Bristol Rovers on the opening day of the season. He missed just six league games of the 2014–15 season as Paul Hurst's Mariners came 3rd in the Conference, and secured a play-off spot. Following a hamstring injury to Josh Gowling, Nsiala reverted to his favored centre-back position in the 2015 Conference Premier play-off final against Bristol Rovers at Wembley on 17 May 2015; following a 1–1 draw after extra time, Grimsby lost 5–3 in a penalty shoot-out.

On 3 June 2015, Nsiala agreed a new one-year deal with the club. Nsiala's first goal for the club came on 11 August 2015 in the second game of the 2015–16 season, scoring the 4th goal in 4–1 thrashing of Barrow, a scramble in the box and Nsiala dived into a challenge to flick it home.

Nsiala played in Grimsby's 3–1 victory over Forest Green Rovers in the 2016 National League play-off final at Wembley, seeing Grimsby promoted to League Two after a six-year absence from the Football League.

=== Hartlepool United ===
Nsiala joined Hartlepool United in June 2016 on a two-year deal, having turned down a new contract at Grimsby Town. Nsiala scored his first goal for the club in a 2–1 loss to Notts County on 20 August 2016. A week later he was sent off for deliberate handball in a 2–2 draw with Newport County. Nsiala was sent off again on 31 August 2016 in an EFL Trophy tie against Notts County, though this time it was expected to be a case of mistaken identity.

=== Shrewsbury Town ===
Six months into his contract at Hartlepool, Nsiala joined League One side Shrewsbury Town for an undisclosed fee on 1 January 2017, signing a deal until summer 2019. The move reunited him with Paul Hurst who had previously managed him at Grimsby. He was sent off 53 minutes into his Shrewsbury debut, having been deemed to have fouled Luke Norris in a 1–1 draw away at Swindon Town, although the red card was later rescinded on appeal. Nsiala scored his first goal for the club – a 90th minute match-winning header against AFC Wimbledon – on 18 February to earn his side a fourth successive home victory. In his first half-season he established a strong defensive partnership with the experienced left-sided centre-back Mat Sadler to help steer Shrewsbury away from relegation danger.

=== Ipswich Town ===
After putting in transfer requests, Nsiala and Jon Nolan signed for Ipswich Town on 8 August 2018 for a combined fee of £2 million, reuniting with their former Grimsby and Shrewsbury manager Paul Hurst, with both players signing three-year contracts with the option of an additional year's extension. He scored his first goal for the club in a 2–1 loss at Sheffield Wednesday on 25 August 2018, however he was later sent off in the same match. He made 24 appearances in all competitions during his first season at Portman Road, scoring once.

Nsiala suffered a hamstring injury during a friendly match against Fortuna Düsseldorf in the pre-season of the 2019–20 season. He returned to first-team action on 8 October 2019, starting in a 4–0 home win over Gillingham at Portman Road in a group stage match of the EFL Trophy.

On 10 May 2021, Ipswich announced that they had taken up the option to extend Nsiala's contract by an additional year, keeping him under contract until 2022.

==== Bolton Wanderers (loan) ====
On 10 January 2020, Nsiala joined Bolton Wanderers on loan for the remainder of the 2019–20 season.

=== Fleetwood Town ===
On 14 January 2022, Nsiala joined Fleetwood Town on a permanent deal. He signed a new two-year contract with the club at the end of the 2021–22 season.

Nsiala left Fleetwood Town on 30 November 2023, by mutual consent.

=== Burton Albion ===
On 9 February 2024, Nsiala joined League One club Burton Albion on a short-term contract until the end of the season.

=== Return to Shrewsbury Town ===
In June 2024, Nsiala agreed to return to League One club Shrewsbury Town on a two-year deal, reuniting for a fourth time with manager Paul Hurst.

On 15 October 2025, he departed the club by mutual consent due to family reasons, choosing to take some time away from football.

=== Bury FC ===
In January 2026, Nsiala agreed a deal with Northern Premier League West side Bury.

== International career ==
Eligible to play for DR Congo, England, Scotland and Wales, Nsiala was first called up by Wales to their under-19 training squad in July 2009.

He made his international debut for DR Congo in a qualifier for the 2013 Africa Cup of Nations against the Seychelles on 15 June 2012, coming on as a substitute for Diego Kazadi Mutombo in a 3–0 victory.

== Career statistics ==
=== Club ===
As of end of the 2025-26 season

Appearances and goals by club, season and competition
| Club | Season | League | | | FA Cup | | League Cup | | Other | | Total | |
| Club | Season | Division | Apps | Goals | Apps | Goals | Apps | Goals | Apps | Goals | Apps | Goals |
|---|---|---|---|---|---|---|---|---|---|---|---|---|
| Everton | 2009–10 | Premier League | 0 | 0 | 0 | 0 | 0 | 0 | 0 | 0 | 0 | 0 |
| Everton | 2010–11 | Premier League | 0 | 0 | 0 | 0 | 0 | 0 | — | | 0 | 0 |
| Everton | 2011–12 | Premier League | 0 | 0 | 0 | 0 | 0 | 0 | — | | 0 | 0 |
| Everton | Total | | 0 | 0 | 0 | 0 | 0 | 0 | 0 | 0 | 0 | 0 |
| Macclesfield Town (loan) | 2010–11 | League Two | 10 | 0 | 3 | 1 | 0 | 0 | 0 | 0 | 13 | 1 |
| Accrington Stanley (loan) | 2011–12 | League Two | 19 | 0 | 0 | 0 | 0 | 0 | 0 | 0 | 19 | 0 |
| Accrington Stanley | 2012–13 | League Two | 17 | 0 | 2 | 0 | 1 | 0 | 0 | 0 | 20 | 0 |
| Accrington Stanley | Total | | 36 | 0 | 2 | 0 | 1 | 0 | 0 | 0 | 39 | 0 |
| Southport | 2013–14 | Conference Premier | 19 | 1 | 0 | 0 | — | | 0 | 0 | 19 | 1 |
| Grimsby Town | 2014–15 | Conference Premier | 40 | 0 | 2 | 0 | — | | 5 (Note: Two appearances in FA Trophy, three in Conference Premier play-offs) | 0 | 47 | 0 |
| Grimsby Town | 2015–16 | National League | 39 | 1 | 3 | 0 | — | | 7 (Note: Four appearances in FA Trophy, three in National League play-offs) | 0 | 49 | 1 |
| Grimsby Town | Total | | 79 | 1 | 5 | 0 | 0 | 0 | 12 | 0 | 96 | 1 |
| Hartlepool United | 2016–17 | League Two | 21 | 1 | 2 | 0 | 1 | 0 | 1 (Note: Appearance in EFL Trophy) | 0 | 25 | 1 |
| Shrewsbury Town | 2016–17 | League One | 21 | 1 | 0 | 0 | 0 | 0 | 0 | 0 | 21 | 1 |
| Shrewsbury Town | 2017–18 | League One | 44 | 3 | 4 | 0 | 1 | 0 | 9 (Note: Six appearances in EFL Trophy, three in League One play-offs) | 0 | 58 | 3 |
| Shrewsbury Town | Total | | 65 | 4 | 4 | 0 | 1 | 0 | 9 | 0 | 79 | 4 |
| Ipswich Town | 2018–19 | Championship | 22 | 1 | 1 | 0 | 1 | 0 | — | | 24 | 1 |
| Ipswich Town | 2019–20 | League One | 3 | 0 | 3 | 0 | 0 | 0 | 3 | 0 | 9 | 0 |
| Ipswich Town | 2020–21 | League One | 27 | 0 | 1 | 0 | 2 | 0 | 0 | 0 | 30 | 0 |
| Ipswich Town | 2021–22 | League One | 11 | 0 | 3 | 0 | 0 | 0 | 1 | 0 | 15 | 0 |
| Ipswich Town | Total | | 63 | 1 | 8 | 0 | 3 | 0 | 4 | 0 | 78 | 1 |
| Bolton Wanderers (loan) | 2019–20 | League One | 12 | 0 | 0 | 0 | 0 | 0 | 0 | 0 | 12 | 0 |
| Fleetwood Town | 2021–22 | League One | 20 | 0 | 0 | 0 | 0 | 0 | 0 | 0 | 20 | 0 |
| Fleetwood Town | 2022–23 | League One | 35 | 0 | 5 | 1 | 1 | 0 | 1 | 0 | 42 | 1 |
| Fleetwood Town | 2023–24 | League One | 12 | 0 | 0 | 0 | 1 | 0 | 1 | 0 | 14 | 0 |
| Fleetwood Town | Total | | 67 | 0 | 5 | 1 | 2 | 0 | 2 | 0 | 76 | 1 |
| Burton Albion | 2023–24 | League One | 11 | 1 | 0 | 0 | 0 | 0 | 0 | 0 | 11 | 1 |
| Shrewsbury Town | 2024–25 | League One | 20 | 1 | 1 | 0 | 1 | 0 | 2 | 1 | 24 | 2 |
| Shrewsbury Town | 2025–26 | League Two | 3 | 0 | 0 | 0 | 1 | 0 | 1 | 0 | 5 | 0 |
| Shrewsbury Town | Total | | 23 | 1 | 1 | 0 | 2 | 0 | 3 | 1 | 29 | 2 |
| Bury | 2025–26 | Northern Premier League Premier Division | 2 | 0 | 0 | 0 | 0 | 0 | 0 | 0 | 2 | 0 |
| Career total | | | 408 | 10 | 30 | 2 | 10 | 0 | 31 | 1 | 475 | 12 |

=== International ===
As of match played 17 June 2012

Appearances and goals by national team and year
| National team | Year | Apps | Goals |
|---|---|---|---|
| DR Congo | 2012 | 1 | 0 |
| Total | | 1 | 0 |

== Honours ==
Grimsby Town

- National League play-offs: 2016
- FA Trophy runner-up: 2015–16

Shrewsbury Town

- EFL Trophy runner-up: 2017–18
