= Max McMillan =

British footballer (born 2002)

Personal information
- Full name: Max Henry McMillan
- Date of birth: 3 October 2002 (age 24)
- Place of birth: York, England
- Position: Forward

Team information
- Current team: North Ferriby

Youth career
- Haxby Town
- –2021: Leeds United

Senior career*
Years	Team	Apps	(Gls)
2021–2023	Fleetwood Town	0	(0)
2022	→ Radcliffe (loan)	3	(1)
2023–2024	Wigan Athletic	0	(0)
2024–	North Ferriby	1	(0)
- * Club domestic league appearances and goals as of 17:48, 23 October 2024 (UTC)

Max Henry McMillan (born 3 October 2002) is a professional footballer who plays as a forward for Northern Premier League Division One East club North Ferriby.

== Early and personal life ==
McMillan is the son of former York City player Andy McMillan and the grandson of former Pretoria Callies coach Trevor McMillan, whilst his brother Alex was a scholar at Grimsby Town. He was born in York but is of South African descent through his father. He attended Joseph Rowntree School in York.

== Club career ==
After playing youth football for Haxby Town at under-7s level, McMillan joined Leeds United's academy aged 8. He signed a two-year scholarship deal with the club in April 2019. On 23 April 2021, McMillan signed for League One club Fleetwood Town on a contract until the end of the 2022–23 season. He made his debut for Fleetwood Town on 5 October 2021 in a 3–1 win against Barrow in the EFL Trophy, and scored the final goal after latching onto a cross from Ryan Edmondson. McMillan joined Northern Premier League Premier Division club Radcliffe on a month-long loan on 17 February 2022. He departed Fleetwood at the end of the 2022–23 season.

In September 2023, McMillan joined Wigan Athletic's under-21 side on a contract until the end of the season having impressed on trial.

He was released by Wigan at the end of the 2023–24 season.

In October 2024, McMillan joined Northern Premier League Division One East club North Ferriby.

== International career ==
Being of South African descent through his father, McMillan is eligible to represent the Bafana Bafana, with his father Andy stating in October 2019 that he and his brother Alex were 'desperate' to represent South Africa.

== Career statistics ==
As of match played 30 November 2021

Appearances and goals by club, season and competition
Club	Season	League			FA Cup		EFL Cup		Other		Total	
Club	Season	Division	Apps	Goals	Apps	Goals	Apps	Goals	Apps	Goals	Apps	Goals
Leeds United U21	2020–21	—			—		—		1 (Note: Appearance in EFL Trophy)	0	1	0
Fleetwood Town	2021–22	League One	0	0	0	0	0	0	2	1	2	1
Radcliffe (loan)	2021–22	NPL Premier Division	3	1	—		—		—		3	1
Career total			3	1	0	0	0	0	3	1	6	2
