= Dan Batty =

English footballer (born 1997)

Personal information
- Full name: Daniel Thomas Batty
- Date of birth: 10 December 1997 (age 28)
- Place of birth: Pontefract, England
- Height: 5 ft 10 in (1.78 m)
- Position: Midfielder

Team information
- Current team: Scunthorpe United

Youth career
- 2003–2012: Leeds United
- 2012–2016: Hull City

Senior career*
Years	Team	Apps	(Gls)
2016–2021	Hull City	64	(1)
2017	→ FC Halifax Town (loan)	5	(2)
2021–2023	Fleetwood Town	75	(5)
2023–2026	York City	107	(1)
2026–	Scunthorpe United	2	(0)
- * Club domestic league appearances and goals as of 12:51, 30 September 2026 (UTC)

Daniel Thomas Batty (born 10 December 1997) is an English professional footballer who plays as a midfielder for National League club Scunthorpe United.

== Career ==
=== Hull City ===
After starting his career at Leeds United from the age of 5, Batty was released by Leeds at under 16's level, after being released by Leeds, Batty joined Hull City at the age of 15 and was involved with the first team squad on several occasions during the 2016–17 season. On 22 August 2017, he made his debut in a 2–0 EFL Cup defeat to Doncaster Rovers. On 6 May 2018, he made his full league debut for the club in the final match of the 2017–18 season, a 1–1 away draw to Brentford. On 11 June 2020, Batty agreed a short-term contract extension to cover the extended 2019–20 season, and on 26 June 2020, the club took up an option for a year extension to his contract.

On 27 October 2017, Batty moved on a month-long loan spell to FC Halifax Town. He made his debut the following day away to Tranmere Rovers, scoring the second goal in a 4–2 defeat.

=== Fleetwood Town ===
On 1 February 2021, Batty moved to Fleetwood Town after his contract with Hull City was terminated by mutual consent. He signed a new contract in April 2021 until the end of the 2022–23 season having played in all of Fleetwood's games since joining. Injury and a sending off against Accrington Stanley in December 2021 interrupted his 2021–22 season. Batty scored in the opening two games of the 2022–23 season against Port Vale and Plymouth with head coach Scott Brown saying, "He always wants the ball and he's got that brilliant willingness to run in behind defences." He was released by Fleetwood at the end of the 2022–23 season having made a total of 75 league appearances since February 2021.

=== York City ===
Batty joined York City in August 2023 on a three-year contract. On 11 May 2026, the club announced it was releasing him.

=== Scunthorpe United ===
On 26 September 2026, Batty joined National League club Scunthorpe United on a short-term deal until January 2027.

== Career statistics ==
As of end of 2025–26 season

Appearances and goals by club, season and competition
Club	Season	League			FA Cup		EFL Cup		Other		Total	
Club	Season	Division	Apps	Goals	Apps	Goals	Apps	Goals	Apps	Goals	Apps	Goals
Hull City	2016–17	Premier League	0	0	0	0	0	0	0	0	0	0
Hull City	2017–18	Championship	1	0	2	0	1	0	0	0	4	0
Hull City	2018–19	Championship	27	0	1	0	1	0	0	0	29	0
Hull City	2019–20	Championship	30	1	1	0	2	0	0	0	33	1
Hull City	2020–21	League One	6	0	1	0	2	0	4 (Note: Appearances in the EFL Trophy)	0	13	0
Hull City	Total		64	1	5	0	6	0	4	0	79	1
FC Halifax Town (loan)	2017–18	National League	5	2	0	0	0	0	0	0	5	2
Fleetwood Town	2020–21	League One	17	0	0	0	0	0	0	0	17	0
Fleetwood Town	2021–22	League One	30	2	1	0	1	0	2	0	34	2
Fleetwood Town	2022–23	League One	28	3	4	0	2	0	2	0	36	3
Fleetwood Town	Total		75	5	5	0	3	0	4	0	87	5
York City	2023–24	National League	25	0	2	0	–		0	0	27	0
York City	2024–25	National League	41	0	1	0	–		3 (Note: Two appearances in FA Trophy; one appearance in National League play-offs)	0	45	0
York City	2025–26	National League	41	1	2	0	–		1 (Note: Appearance in FA Trophy)	0	44	1
York City	Total		107	1	5	0	0	0	4	0	116	1
Career total			251	9	15	0	9	0	12	0	287	9

== Honours ==
York City

- National League: 2025–26
