= 2021–22 Fleetwood Town F.C. season =

Fleetwood Town
2021–22 season
- Chairman: Andrew Pilley
- Manager: Simon Grayson (until 24 November); Stephen Crainey (from 21 December)
- Stadium: Highbury Stadium
- League One: 20th
- FA Cup: First round
- EFL Cup: First round
- EFL Trophy: Group stage
- Top goalscorer: League: Gerard Garner (5); All: Gerard Garner (5)
Home colours	Away colours

The 2021–22 season is Fleetwood Town's 114th year in their history and eighth consecutive season in League One. Along with the league, the club will also compete in the FA Cup, the EFL Cup and the EFL Trophy. The season covers the period from 1 July 2021 to 30 June 2022.

== Pre-season friendlies ==
Fleetwood Town announced friendly matches against Radcliffe, Port Vale, Rochdale, St Johnstone, Huddersfield Town, Leeds United, Chester, Wrexham and Stockport County as part of their pre-season preparations.

10 July 2021 Friendly	Radcliffe	0–2	Fleetwood Town	Radcliffe
15:00 BST		Report	Garner 5'; Teale 87'	Stadium: Neuven Stadium

13 July 2021 Friendly	Fleetwood Town	1–0	Port Vale	Thornton-Cleveleys
13:00 BST	Rossiter 38'	Report		Stadium: Poolfort Farm; Attendance: 0 (Behind-closed-doors)
Note: 4x30 minute periods

17 July 2021 Friendly	Rochdale	3–3	Fleetwood Town	Spotland
15:00 BST	Dooley 8'; Beesley 60'; Holgate 66' (o.g.)	Report	Andrew 50'; Edmondson 83', 86'	Stadium: Crown Oil Arena

24 July 2021 Friendly	St Johnstone	0–0	Fleetwood Town	Tulloch, Scotland
13:00 BST		Report		Stadium: McDiarmid Park

27 July 2021 Friendly	Fleetwood Town	2–1	Huddersfield Town	Fleetwood
19:00 BST	Morris 5'; Garner 29'	Report	O'Brien 77'	Stadium: Highbury Stadium

30 July 2021 Friendly	Fleetwood Town	2–1	Leeds United	Fleetwood
19:00 BST	Morris 54'; Garner 60' (pen.)	Report	Cresswell 23'	Stadium: Highbury Stadium

31 July 2021 Friendly	Chester	3–0	Fleetwood Town	Chester
15:00 BST	Dudley 6'; Hardy 54'; Oyibo 71'	Report		Stadium: Deva Stadium

3 August 2021 Friendly	Fleetwood Town XI	0–4	Wrexham	Thornton-Cleveleys
14:00 BST		Report		Stadium: Poolfort Farm

14 August 2021 Friendly	Stockport County	3–3	Fleetwood Town XI	Edgeley
15:00 BST		Report		Stadium: Edgeley Park; Attendance: 2,054

== Competitions ==
=== League One ===
==== League table ====
Pos	Team	Pld	W	D	L	GF	GA	GD	Pts	Promotion, qualification or relegation
16	Burton Albion	46	14	11	21	51	67	−16	53	
17	Lincoln City	46	14	10	22	55	63	−8	52	
18	Shrewsbury Town	46	12	14	20	47	51	−4	50	
19	Morecambe	46	10	12	24	57	88	−31	42	
20	Fleetwood Town	46	8	16	22	62	82	−20	40	
21	Gillingham (R)	46	8	16	22	35	69	−34	40	Relegation to EFL League Two
22	Doncaster Rovers (R)	46	10	8	28	37	82	−45	38	Relegation to EFL League Two
23	AFC Wimbledon (R)	46	6	19	21	49	75	−26	37	Relegation to EFL League Two
24	Crewe Alexandra (R)	46	7	8	31	37	83	−46	29	Relegation to EFL League Two

Source: EFL Official Website
Rules for classification: 1) Points; 2) Goal difference; 3) Number of goals scored; 4) Head-to-head results; 5) Wins; 6) Away goals; 7) Penalty points based on yellow and red cards received excluding the last four games of the season (sec 9.5); 8) 12-point sending off offences; 9) If the tie affects the automatic promotion or relegation places, a play-off game or games would be held between the two tied teams
(R) Relegated

==== Results summary ====
Overall								Home						Away					
Pld	W	D	L	GF	GA	GD	Pts	W	D	L	GF	GA	GD	W	D	L	GF	GA	GD
46	8	16	22	62	82	−20	40	5	8	10	33	38	−5	3	8	12	29	44	−15

Last updated: 30 April 2022.

==== Results by matchday ====
Matchday	1	2	3	4	5	6	7	8	9	10	11	12	13	14	15	16	17	18	19	20	21	22	23	24	25	26	27	28	29	30	31	32	33	34	35	36	37	38	39	40	41	42	43	44	45	46
Ground	H	A	A	H	A	A	H	A	A	H	H	H	A	H	H	H	A	A	A	H	H	A	H	A	H	A	H	H	A	H	A	A	A	H	A	A	A	H	A	H	H	H	A	H	H	A
Result	L	L	L	W	D	W	D	D	D	L	W	L	L	D	L	L	L	D	L	W	W	D	L	W	W	L	D	D	D	D	L	D	L	L	L	L	L	D	W	D	L	L	D	D	L	L
Position	22	22	22	19	18	17	17	18	20	20	19	20	21	22	22	22	22	22	22	21	19	18	19	20	19	20	19	19	19	19	19	19	19	19	19	19	19	19	19	19	19	21	21	20	20	20

Updated to match(es) played on 30 April 2022. Source: Statto.com
A = Away; H = Home; W = Win; D = Draw; L = Loss

==== Matches ====
Fleetwood Town's fixtures were released on 24 June 2021.

7 August 2021 1	Fleetwood Town	0–1	Portsmouth	Fleetwood
15:00 BST		Report	Brown (yellow card) 24', (goal) 60'; Curtis (yellow card) 43'; Freeman (yellow card) 63'	Stadium: Highbury Stadium; Attendance: 4,562; Referee: Ben Speedie

14 August 2021 2	Lincoln City	2–1	Fleetwood Town	Lincoln
15:00 BST	Melbourne (yellow card) 31'; Edun (yellow card) 64'; Scully 69', 87' (pen.); Bishop (yellow card) 75'	Report	Matete (yellow card) 7'; Andrew 32'; Clark (yellow card) 74'; Hill (yellow card) 86'	Stadium: LNER Stadium; Attendance: 8,241; Referee: James Oldham

17 August 2021 3	Sheffield Wednesday	1–0	Fleetwood Town	Owlerton
19:45 BST	Gregory 15'; Byers (yellow card) 17'; Johnson (yellow card) 34'; Bannan (yellow card) 69'; Iorfa (yellow card) 87'	Report	Halliday (yellow card) 23'; Rossiter (yellow card) 35'; Morton (yellow card) 49'; Holgate (yellow card) 83'; Biggins (yellow card) 90+1'	Stadium: Hillsborough; Attendance: 21,130; Referee: Seb Stockbridge

21 August 2021 4	Fleetwood Town	3–2	Cheltenham Town	Fleetwood
15:00 BST	Clarke 33'; Johnson 81'; Morris 90'; Morton (yellow card) 90+3'	Report	Wright 8', (yellow card) 83'; Raglan (yellow card) 36'; Thomas (yellow card) 46'; Hussey (yellow card) 86'; May 87'	Stadium: Highbury Stadium; Attendance: 2,392; Referee: Andy Haines

28 August 2021 5	Plymouth Argyle	1–1	Fleetwood Town	Plymouth
15:00 BST	Hardie 21'	Report	Camps 35'; Johnson (yellow card) 42'; Clarke (yellow card) 73'	Stadium: Home Park; Attendance: 10,453; Referee: Sam Purkiss

11 September 2021 6	Rotherham United	2–4	Fleetwood Town	Rotherham
15:00 BST	Smith 38'; Sadlier 45+4' (pen.)	Report	Morton 24'; Garner 54'; Clark (yellow card) 56'; Andrew 61'; Camps 69'; Hill (yellow card) 88'; Rossiter (yellow card) 89'	Stadium: AESSEAL New York Stadium; Attendance: 8,463; Referee: Craig Hicks

18 September 2021 7	Fleetwood Town	2–2	Sunderland	Fleetwood
15:00 BST	Morton 81'; J. Garner (yellow card) 85'; G. Garner (yellow card) 90+4', (goal) 90+7' (pen.)	Report	Stewart 19'; O'Nien (yellow card) 53'; McGeady 76' (pen.)	Stadium: Highbury Stadium; Attendance: 4,250; Referee: Neil Hair

25 September 2021 8	Cambridge United	2–2	Fleetwood Town	Cambridge
15:00 BST	Digby (yellow card) 30'; May 35'; Tracey 51'	Report	Hill 2'; Lane 76'	Stadium: Abbey Stadium; Attendance: 4,429; Referee: Paul Howard

28 September 2021 9	Milton Keynes Dons	3–3	Fleetwood Town	Denbigh
19:45 BST	Twine 27', 39', 73'; O'Riley (yellow card) 81'	Report	Garner 12', 32'; Rossiter (yellow card) 63'; Biggins (yellow card) 78'; Batty 88'	Stadium: Stadium MK; Attendance: 6,564; Referee: Peter Wright

2 October 2021 10	Fleetwood Town	1–2	Charlton Athletic	Fleetwood
15:00 BST	Andrew (yellow card) 15', (goal) 51'; Clarke (yellow card) 66'	Report	Leko (yellow card) 15', (goal) 41'; Gilbey (yellow card) 55'; Stockley 69'	Stadium: Highbury Stadium; Attendance: 3,197; Referee: Oliver Langford

16 October 2021 11	Fleetwood Town	3–0	Crewe Alexandra	Fleetwood
15:00 BST	Johnson 60'; Andrew (yellow card) 65', (goal) 72'; Batty (yellow card) 65'; Garner 90+6'	Report	McFadzean (yellow card) 65'; Robertson (yellow card) 65'; Finney (yellow card) 71'; Thomas (yellow card) 90+4'	Stadium: Highbury Stadium; Attendance: 2,917; Referee: Marc Edwards

19 October 2021 12	Fleetwood Town	0–1	Burton Albion	Fleetwood
19:45 GMT		Report	Blake-Tracy (yellow card) 33'; O'Connor 36'; Borthwick-Jackson (yellow card) 84'	Stadium: Highbury Stadium; Attendance: 2,226; Referee: Simon Mather

23 October 2021 13	Ipswich Town	2–1	Fleetwood Town	Ipswich
15:00 BST	Chaplin 49'; Morsy (yellow card) 77'; Celina 90+3', (yellow card) 90+4'	Report	Hill (yellow card) 32'; Matete (yellow card) 71'; Johnson (yellow card) 79'; Morton 82'	Stadium: Portman Road; Attendance: 20,099; Referee: Sam Allison

30 October 2021 14	Fleetwood Town	3–3	Wycombe Wanderers	Fleetwood
15:00 BST	Andrew 5', (yellow card) 88'; Garner 60'; Morris 64'	Report	Hanlan 24'; Akinfenwa 30'; Tafazolli (yellow card) 32'; Vokes 50'; Jacobson (yellow card) 76'; Scowen (yellow card) 80'	Stadium: Highbury Stadium; Attendance: 2,657; Referee: Andrew Kitchen

2 November 2021 15	Fleetwood Town	2–3	Wigan Athletic	Fleetwood
19:45 GMT	Andrew 8', (yellow card) 37'; Morton 52' (pen.); Batty (yellow card) 84'; Morris (yellow card) 87'	Report	Darikwa (yellow card) 35'; Lang 62', (yellow card) 79'; Keane 68'; Tilt 72'	Stadium: Highbury Stadium; Attendance: 3,246; Referee: Ross Joyce

20 November 2021 16	Fleetwood Town	1–2	Morecambe	Fleetwood
15:00 GMT	Johnson 82'; Pilkington (yellow card) 90+5' (yellow-red card) 90+6'	Report	Jones 11'; McLoughlin (yellow card) 43'; Stockton 90+4', (yellow card) 90+5'	Stadium: Highbury Stadium; Attendance: 3,545; Referee: Darren Drysdale

23 November 2021 17	Oxford United	3–1	Fleetwood Town	Littlemore
19:45 GMT	McNally 5'; Brannagan 13'; Holland 69'; Whyte (yellow card) 89'	Report	Matete 40', (yellow card) 84'; Clark (yellow card) 52'; Batty (yellow card) 65'	Stadium: The Kassam Stadium; Attendance: 5,708; Referee: Ollie Yates

27 November 2021 18	AFC Wimbledon	2–2	Fleetwood Town	Wimbledon
15:00 GMT	Heneghan (yellow card) 25'; Assal 53'; McCormick 79'	Report	Matete (yellow card) 23'; Garner 35'; Johnson 84'; Edmondson (yellow card) 90+6'	Stadium: Plough Lane; Attendance: 7,405; Referee: Bobby Madley

4 December 2021 19	Accrington Stanley	5–1	Fleetwood Town	Accrington
15:00 GMT	Hamilton 29', (yellow card) 57', (goal) 90'; Bishop 46', 78'; Coyle 72'	Report	Batty (red card) 23'; Hayes (yellow card) 28'; Biggins 57'; Lane (yellow card) 74'	Stadium: Wham Stadium; Attendance: 1,901; Referee: Tom Nield

7 December 2021 20	Fleetwood Town	3–0	Bolton Wanderers	Fleetwood
19:45 GMT	Garner 6'; Hayes (yellow card) 26'; McLaughlin (yellow card) 35'; Biggins 77', 79'	Report	Santos (red card) 73'	Stadium: Highbury Stadium; Attendance: 3,279; Referee: Seb Stockbridge

11 December 2021 21	Fleetwood Town	2–1	Gillingham	Fleetwood
15:00 GMT	Biggins 38', (yellow card) 90+7'; Clarke 65'	Report	Phillips (yellow card) 65'; McKenzie 74'; Tutonda (yellow card) 90'	Stadium: Highbury Stadium; Attendance: 2,313; Referee: Steve Martin

18 December 2021 22	Morecambe	0–0	Fleetwood Town	Morecambe
15:00 GMT	McLoughlin (yellow card) 83'	Report	Matete (yellow card) 79'	Stadium: Mazuma Stadium; Attendance: 4,018; Referee: Christopher Pollard

27 December 2021 23	Fleetwood Town	0–3	Shrewsbury Town	Fleetwood
15:00 GMT		Report	Leahy (yellow card) 40'; Bowman 49'; Udoh (yellow card) 63', (goal) 80'; Vela 72'	Stadium: Highbury Stadium; Attendance: 2,878; Referee: Anthony Backhouse

8 January 2022 24	Doncaster Rovers	0–1	Fleetwood Town	Doncaster
15:00 GMT	Barlow (yellow card) 43'; Rowe (yellow card) 81'	Report	Harrison 50'; Camps (yellow card) 80'; Hayes (yellow card) 90'	Stadium: Keepmoat Stadium; Attendance: 5,648; Referee: Darren Bond

15 January 2022 25	Fleetwood Town	1–0	Rotherham United	Fleetwood
15:00 GMT	Johnson (yellow card) 7'; Clarke (yellow card) 65'; Pilkington 90+5'	Report		Stadium: Highbury Stadium; Attendance: 3,385; Referee: Robert Lewis

22 January 2022 26	Charlton Athletic	2–0	Fleetwood Town	Charlton
15:00 GMT	Burstow 53'; Dobson (yellow card) 70'; Aneke (yellow card) 79'; Morgan 90+2'	Report	Matete (yellow card) 52'	Stadium: The Valley; Attendance: 21,811; Referee: Brett Huxtable

25 January 2022 27	Fleetwood Town	3–3	Plymouth Argyle	Fleetwood
19:45 GMT	Lane 24'; Jules (yellow card) 78'; Harrison 89'; Pilkington 90+2'	Report	Jephcott 30'; Edwards 49'; Ennis 75'; Garrick (yellow card) 78'	Stadium: Highbury Stadium; Attendance: 2,584; Referee: Marc Edwards

29 January 2022 28	Fleetwood Town	1–1	Cambridge United	Fleetwood
15:00 GMT	Lane 72'; Camps (yellow card) 73'	Report	May (yellow card) 41'; Pilkington 65' (o.g.); Okedina (yellow card) 81'	Stadium: Highbury Stadium; Attendance: 2,515; Referee: Rebecca Welch

5 February 2022 29	Shrewsbury Town	1–1	Fleetwood Town	Shrewsbury
15:00 GMT	Leahy 48' (pen.), (yellow card) 69'	Report	Pilkington 21'; Lane (yellow card) 79'; Johnson (yellow card) 90+2'; Camps (red card) 90+3'	Stadium: Montgomery Waters Meadow; Attendance: 5,808; Referee: James Bell

8 February 2022 30	Fleetwood Town	1–1	Milton Keynes Dons	Fleetwood
19:45 GMT	Biggins (yellow card) 47'; Lane 51'; Butterworth (yellow card) 73'; Pilkington (yellow card) 82'	Report	Darling 12'; Watson (yellow card) 82'; Lewington (yellow card) 90+5'	Stadium: Highbury Stadium; Attendance: 3,227; Referee: Chris Sarginson

12 February 2022 31	Cheltenham Town	2–0	Fleetwood Town	Cheltenham
15:00 GMT	May 41'; Raglan 45'; Williams (yellow card) 57'	Report	Nsiala (yellow card) 48'; Hayes (yellow card) 87'	Stadium: Jonny-Rocks Stadium; Attendance: 3,517; Referee: Bobby Madley

26 February 2022 32	Portsmouth	3–3	Fleetwood Town	Milton
15:00 GMT	Curtis 45' (pen.), (yellow card) 50'; Harness 80'; O'Brien 90+5'	Report	Pilkington 7'; Biggins 15'; Lane 41', (yellow card) 57'; Cairns (yellow card) 73'; Harrison (yellow card) 82'	Stadium: Fratton Park; Attendance: 15,224; Referee: Alan Young

1 March 2022 33	Wigan Athletic	2–0	Fleetwood Town	Wigan
19:45 GMT	Shinnie (yellow card) 14'; Keane 37' (pen.); McClean 42', (red card) 90+7'; Darikwa (yellow card) 66'; Power (yellow card) 81'	Report	Garner (red card) 90+7'	Stadium: DW Stadium; Attendance: 8,627; Referee: Martin Coy

5 March 2022 34	Fleetwood Town	0–2	Ipswich Town	Fleetwood
15:00 GMT	Pilkington (yellow card) 63'	Report	Woolfenden (yellow card) 69'; Morsy 72', (yellow card) 74'; Jackson 81'	Stadium: Highbury Stadium; Attendance: 4,190; Referee: Andrew Kitchen

8 March 2022 35	Sunderland	3–1	Fleetwood Town	Sunderland
19:45 GMT	Evans (yellow card) 22'; Embleton 55'; Cirkin (yellow card) 75'; O'Nien 82'; Clarke 90+1'	Report	Harrison 28'; Jules (yellow card) 76' (yellow-red card) 87'	Stadium: Stadium of Light; Attendance: 28,017; Referee: Sam Barrott

12 March 2022 36	Burton Albion	3–2	Fleetwood Town	Burton upon Trent
15:00 GMT	Hamer (yellow card) 37'; Niasse 61', 90'; Moult 84'	Report	Nsiala (yellow card) 14'; Oshilaja 18' (o.g.); Garner (yellow card) 36'; Butterworth 57'	Stadium: Pirelli Stadium; Attendance: 2,648; Referee: Oliver Langford

15 March 2022 37	Wycombe Wanderers	1–0	Fleetwood Town	High Wycombe
19:45 GMT	Wing (yellow card) 5'; Scowen (yellow card) 74'; McCarthy 90+4'	Report	Lane (yellow card) 52'; Boyle (yellow card) 90+3'	Stadium: Adams Park; Attendance: 3,391; Referee: Josh Smith

19 March 2022 38	Fleetwood Town	0–0	Doncaster Rovers	Fleetwood
15:00 GMT		Report	Barlow (yellow card) 22'	Stadium: Highbury Stadium; Attendance: 3,146; Referee: Paul Howard

2 April 2022 39	Crewe Alexandra	1–3	Fleetwood Town	Crewe
15:00 BST	Long 45+3'	Report	Macadam 18'; Pilkington 64'; Harrison 73'	Stadium: Alexandra Stadium; Attendance: 3,813; Referee: Will Finnie

5 April 2022 40	Fleetwood Town	1–1	Lincoln City	Fleetwood
19:45 BST	Clarke (yellow card) 22'; Batty 31'; Butterworth (yellow card) 90+3'	Report	Walsh (yellow card) 21'; McGrandles (yellow card) 35'; Fiorini 65'; Jackson (yellow card) 78'	Stadium: Highbury Stadium; Attendance: 3,341; Referee: Peter Wright

9 April 2022 41	Fleetwood Town	1–2	Accrington Stanley	Fleetwood
15:00 BST	Lane (yellow card) 39'; Harrison 45'; Cairns (red card) 85'	Report	Rodgers (yellow card) 33'; Rich-Baghuelou (yellow card) 45+3'; McConville 62'; Nottingham (yellow card) 77', (goal) 90+4'	Stadium: Highbury Stadium; Attendance: 2,881; Referee: Jeremy Simpson

15 April 2022 42	Fleetwood Town	2–3	Oxford United	Fleetwood
15:00 BST	Harrison 39' (pen.), (yellow card) 52'; Hayes 53'	Report	Holland 2'; Brannagan 7', (yellow card) 71'; Bodin 16'; Stevens (yellow card) 90+6'	Stadium: Highbury Stadium; Attendance: 2,589; Referee: Bobby Madley

18 April 2022 43	Gillingham	0–0	Fleetwood Town	Gillingham
15:00 BST	Lee (yellow card) 7'; Ehmer (yellow card) 17'; Kelman (red card) 79'; Tucker (yellow card) 90+6'	Report	Lane (red card) 78'	Stadium: Priestfield Stadium; Attendance: 8,436; Referee: James Linington

23 April 2022 44	Fleetwood Town	1–1	AFC Wimbledon	Fleetwood
15:00 BST	Garner 88', (yellow card) 88'; Batty (yellow card) 90+2'	Report	McCormick 22'; Marsh (yellow card) 38'; Cosgrove (yellow card) 63'; Osei (yellow card) 76'; Heneghan (yellow card) 77'; Brown (yellow card) 90+10'	Stadium: Highbury Stadium; Attendance: 5,019; Referee: Anthony Backhouse

26 April 2022 45	Fleetwood Town	2–3	Sheffield Wednesday	Fleetwood
19:45 BST	Camps 18'; Garner (yellow card) 22', (goal) 34'; Andrew (yellow card) 57'; Boyle (yellow card) 83'	Report	Gregory 4', 73', 74'; Hutchinson (yellow card) 57'; Luongo (yellow card) 59'	Stadium: Highbury Stadium; Attendance: 3,901; Referee: Carl Boyeson

30 April 2022 46	Bolton Wanderers	4–2	Fleetwood Town	Horwich
12:30 BST	Charles 37', 86'; John 53'; Böðvarsson 90+6'	Report	Baggley 17'; Boyle (yellow card) 42'; Garner 79', (yellow card) 82'	Stadium: University of Bolton Stadium; Attendance: 16,886

=== FA Cup ===
Fleetwood were drawn at home to Burton Albion in the first round.

6 November 2021 First round	Fleetwood Town	1–2	Burton Albion	Fleetwood
15:00 GMT	Garner 12'; Clarke (yellow card) 70'	Report	Powell 14'; Jebbison 77'	Stadium: Highbury Stadium; Attendance: 1,362; Referee: Tom Reeves

=== EFL Cup ===
Fleetwood Town were drawn at away to Stoke City in the first round.

10 August 2021 First round	Stoke City	2–1	Fleetwood Town	Stoke-on-Trent
19:45 BST	Surridge 45'; Souttar 77'	Report	Batty (yellow card) 33'; Hill (yellow card) 65'; Matete (yellow card) 69'; Chester 90+4' (o.g.)	Stadium: Bet365 Stadium; Attendance: 4,694; Referee: Anthony Backhouse

=== EFL Trophy ===
Fleetwood were drawn into Group G off the Northern section alongside Accrington Stanley, Barrow and Leicester City U21s. The group stage matches were confirmed on 29 June.

Pos	Div	Team	Pld	W	PW	PL	L	GF	GA	GD	Pts	Qualification
1	L1	Accrington Stanley	3	2	1	0	0	11	3	+8	8	Advance to Round 2
2	L1	Fleetwood Town	3	2	0	0	1	8	6	+2	6	Advance to Round 2
3	L2	Barrow	3	1	0	1	1	4	5	−1	4	
4	ACA	Leicester City U21	3	0	0	0	3	1	10	−9	0	

Source: EFL.com

31 August 2021 Group game 1	Fleetwood Town	4–1	Leicester City U21	Fleetwood
19:45 BST	Morton 6', 42', 48'; Matete (yellow card) 37'; Edmondson 60'; Biggins (yellow card) 74'	Report	Hughes (yellow card) 24'; Godsmark-Ford (yellow card) 53'; Wakeling 75'	Stadium: Highbury Stadium; Attendance: 566; Referee: Sam Barrott

5 October 2021 Group game 2	Barrow	1–3	Fleetwood Town	Barrow-in-Furness
19:45 BST	Zanzala 28'	Report	Matete 48'; Edmondson 55'; McMillan 67'	Stadium: Progression Solicitors Stadium; Attendance: 1,281; Referee: Robert Lewis

9 November 2021 Group game 3	Fleetwood Town	1–4	Accrington Stanley	Fleetwood
19:45 BST	Garner 37' (pen.)	Report	Pell 23'; Hamilton 42'; Leigh 50'; Scully (yellow card) 81'; Nottingham 86'	Stadium: Highbury Stadium; Attendance: 6,33; Referee: James Bell

30 November 2021 Second round	Bolton Wanderers	1–0	Fleetwood Town	Horwich
19:00 GMT	Lee 34'	Report	Biggins (yellow card) 54'; Clark (yellow card) 56'; Teale (yellow card) 63'	Stadium: University of Bolton Stadium; Attendance: 1,773; Referee: Ben Speedie

== Transfers ==
=== Transfers in ===
Date	Position	Nationality	Name	From	Fee	Ref.
15 May 2021	GK	(England)	Tom Donaghy	(England) Bradford City	Undisclosed	
22 June 2021	DF	(England)	Chiekh Thiam	(England) Stockport Town	Undisclosed	
29 June 2021	FW	(England)	Paddy Lane	(England) Hyde United	Undisclosed	
1 July 2021	LB	(England)	Max Clark	(England) Hull City	Free transfer	
1 July 2021	RB	(England)	Tom Clarke	(England) Salford City	Free transfer	
1 July 2021	RB	(England)	Brad Halliday	(England) Doncaster Rovers	Free transfer	
1 July 2021	GK	(England)	Harry Wright	(England) Ipswich Town	Free transfer	
11 July 2021	CB	(England)	Ryan Hand	(England) Aston Villa	Free transfer	
11 July 2021	RB	(England)	Roman Khela	(England) Leeds United	Free transfer	
16 July 2021	LW	(Republic of Ireland)	Anthony Pilkington	(India) East Bengal	Free transfer	
2 August 2021	CB	(England)	Darnell Johnson	(England) Leicester City	Free transfer	
30 August 2021	CF	(England)	Joe Garner	(Cyprus) APOEL	Free transfer	
7 October 2021	RB	(Northern Ireland)	Conor McLaughlin	(England) Sunderland	Free transfer	
2 January 2022	MF	(England)	Harvey Macadam	(England) Ashton United	Undisclosed	
3 January 2022	RM	(England)	Kyle White	(England) AFC Blackpool	Undisclosed	
4 January 2022	CB	(England)	Drew Baker	(England) FC United of Manchester	Undisclosed	
8 January 2022	CF	(Wales)	Ellis Harrison	(England) Portsmouth	Undisclosed	
14 January 2022	CB	(Democratic Republic of the Congo)	Aristote Nsiala	(England) Ipswich Town	Undisclosed	
1 February 2022	GK	(Republic of Ireland)	Kieran O'Hara	(England) Burton Albion	Free transfer	

=== Loans in ===
Date from	Position	Nationality	Name	From	Date until	Ref.
1 July 2021	CF	(England)	Ryan Edmondson	(England) Leeds United	3 January 2022	(Note: On 3 January, Edmondson was recalled to parent club Leeds United.)
26 July 2021	CF	(England)	Callum Morton	(England) West Bromwich Albion	12 January 2022 (Note: On 12 January, Callum Morton was recalled early by parent club West Bromwich Albion.)	
27 August 2021	RB	(England)	Callum Johnson	(England) Portsmouth	End of season	
15 January 2022	CB	(Scotland)	Zak Jules	(England) Milton Keynes Dons	End of season	
27 January 2022	AM	(England)	Josh Harrop	(England) Preston North End	End of season	
31 January 2022	CF	(England)	Daniel Butterworth	(England) Blackburn Rovers	End of season	

=== Loans out ===
Date from	Position	Nationality	Name	To	Date until	Ref.
13 August 2021	MF	(Northern Ireland)	Dylan Boyle	(England) Bamber Bridge	29 October 2021	
13 August 2021	GK	(England)	Tom Donaghy	(England) Farsley Celtic	1 January 2022	
27 August 2021	RB	(England)	Sam Bird	(England) Farsley Celtic	26 September 2021	
8 October 2021	GK	(England)	Harry Wright	(England) Farsley Celtic	8 November 2021	
22 October 2021	RM	(Republic of Ireland)	Cian Hayes	(England) FC United of Manchester	29 November 2021	
26 October 2021	MF	(Northern Ireland)	Barry Baggley	(England) Altrincham	24 November 2021	
29 October 2021	CM	(Australia)	Akiel Raffie	(England) Bamber Bridge	13 December 2021	
13 December 2021	DF	(England)	Billy Batch	(England) Kendal Town	13 January 2022	
13 December 2021	CM	(England)	Danny Edwards	(England) Kendal Town	13 January 2022	
13 December 2021	CM	(Australia)	Akiel Raffie	(England) Kendal Town	13 January 2022	
17 December 2021	CB	(England)	Thomas Hoyle	(England) Bury	17 January 2022	
17 December 2021	MF	(England)	Covy Smith	(England) Barnoldswick Town	January 2022	
18 December 2021	CM	(Northern Ireland)	Harry Wilson	(England) FC United of Manchester	10 February 2022	
24 December 2021	CB	(England)	Connor Teale	(England) Marine	27 January 2022	
2 January 2022	MF	(England)	Ben Thompson	(England) Ashton United	2 February 2022	
8 January 2022	FW	(England)	Harry Clarke	(England) AFC Blackpool	Work experience	
8 January 2022	GK	(England)	Connor Eastham	(England) AFC Blackpool	Work experience	
25 January 2022	CM	(Australia)	Akiel Raffie	(England) Nantwich Town	End of season	
28 January 2022	RB	(England)	Sam Bird	(England) Hyde United	March 2022	
28 January 2022	CB	(England)	Connor Teale	(England) Curzon Ashton	End of season	
4 February 2022	RM	(Northern Ireland)	Chris Conn-Clarke	(England) Altrincham	March 2022	
4 February 2022	CM	(Wales)	Danny Edwards	(England) Colne	End of season	
17 February 2022	CF	(England)	Max McMillan	(England) Radcliffe	March 2022	
25 February 2022	CF	(England)	Donte Thompson-Prempeh	(England) Kendal Town	End of season	
28 March 2022	GK	(England)	Connor Eastham	(England) Charnock Richard	Work experience	

=== Transfers out ===
Date	Position	Nationality	Name	To	Fee	Ref.
3 June 2021	RM	(Wales)	Wes Burns	(England) Ipswich Town	Undisclosed	
30 June 2021	DF	(England)	Sam Barratt	(England) Glossop North End	Released	
30 June 2021	GK	(England)	Johnathon Borwick		Released	
30 June 2021	CF	(England)	Joe Collins		Released	
30 June 2021	CM	(Scotland)	Paul Coutts	(England) Bristol Rovers	Released	
30 June 2021	RM	(England)	Mark Duffy	(England) Tranmere Rovers	Released	
30 June 2021	CM	(England)	Sam Finley	(England) Bristol Rovers	Released	
30 June 2021	CF	(England)	Michael Fowler	(United States) Coastal Carolina Chanticleers	Released	
30 June 2021	LM	(England)	Josh Morris	(England) Salford City	Released	
30 June 2021	CB	(England)	Lewis Patterson	(Northern Ireland) Crusaders	Released	
30 June 2021	CF	(England)	Harvey Saunders	(England) Bristol Rovers	Released	
30 June 2021	DM	(England)	Nathan Sheron	(England) Harrogate Town	Released	
30 June 2021	CF	(England)	Shaun Sithole	(England) Kendal Town	Released	
30 June 2021	MF	(England)	Laurence Smith	(England) Runcorn Linnets	Released	
30 June 2021	LW	(England)	Enoch Takpe	(England) Colne	Released	
30 June 2021	DM	(Republic of Ireland)	Glenn Whelan	(England) Bristol Rovers	Released	
6 July 2021	CB	(England)	Josh Feeney	(England) Aston Villa	Undisclosed	
6 August 2021	GK	(England)	Joel Coleman	(England) Rochdale	Mutual consent	
5 January 2022	CB	(England)	James Hill	(England) Bournemouth	£1,000,000 (Note: Fee was reported to be £1,000,000.)	
14 January 2022	RB	(Northern Ireland)	Conor McLaughlin	Free agent	Contract expired	
20 January 2022	LB	(England)	Max Clark	(England) Rochdale	Mutual consent	
1 February 2022	GK	(England)	Billy Crellin	(England) Everton	Undisclosed	
1 February 2022	CM	(England)	Jay Matete	(England) Sunderland	Undisclosed	
