= Jordan Rossiter =

English footballer (born 1997)

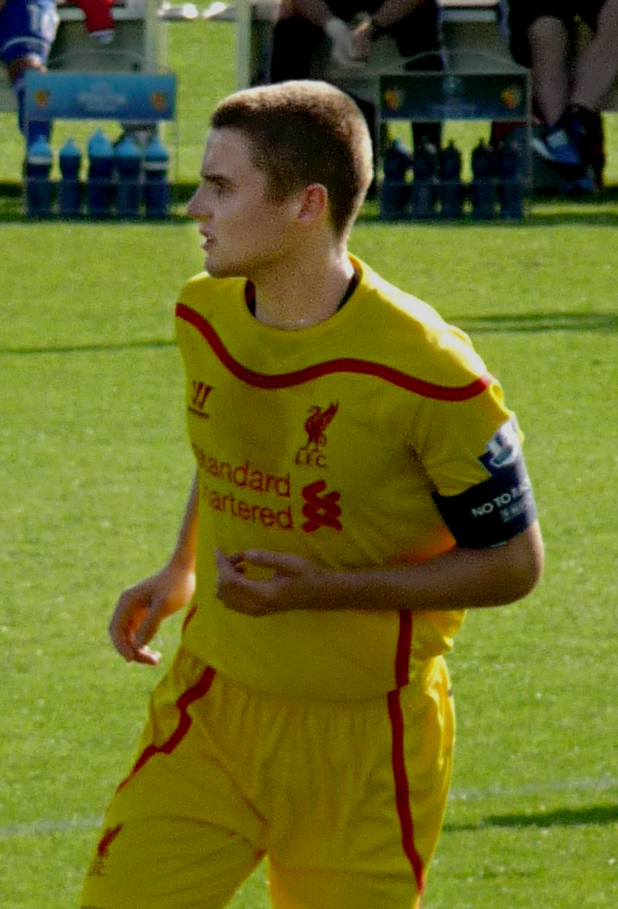
- Rossiter captaining Liverpool U19s in 2014

Personal information
- Full name: Jordan Bernard Rossiter
- Date of birth: 24 March 1997 (age 29)
- Place of birth: Liverpool, England
- Height: 5 ft 10 in (1.78 m)
- Position: Midfielder

Team information
- Current team: Sporting JAX
- Number: 6

Youth career
- 2003–2014: Liverpool

Senior career*
Years	Team	Apps	(Gls)
2014–2016	Liverpool	1	(0)
2016–2020	Rangers	10	(1)
2019	→ Bury (loan)	16	(1)
2019–2020	→ Fleetwood Town (loan)	15	(0)
2020–2022	Fleetwood Town	45	(1)
2022–2024	Bristol Rovers	21	(0)
2024–2025	Shrewsbury Town	15	(0)
2025	→ Oldham Athletic (loan)	21	(0)
2025	Waterford	8	(0)
2026–	Sporting JAX	28	(0)

International career
2011–2012	England U16	3	(1)
2013	England U17	2	(0)
2014	England U18	1	(0)
2015–2016	England U19	9	(0)
- * Club domestic league appearances and goals as of 16:49, 8 November 2026 (UTC)

Jordan Bernard Rossiter (born 24 March 1997) is an English professional footballer who plays as a midfielder for Sporting JAX of the USL Championship.

Rossiter came through the academy at his local club Liverpool where they described him as an "authoritative central midfield presence" with "an extensive passing repertoire with either foot and an eye for goal".

== Club career ==
=== Liverpool ===
==== Youth ====
Rossiter was born in Liverpool, Merseyside and began playing football at the age of three or four in the Anfield junior league. He joined his local side Liverpool when he was 6 years old and first represented the academy at U6 level. He made his debut for Liverpool U18s on his 15th birthday. Still aged 15 he made his U19 debut side in a NextGen series match against Inter Milan, during the game ex-Liverpool striker Robbie Fowler said Rossiter was a talent comparable to Liverpool captain Steven Gerrard. For the 2013–14 season Rossiter, then 16, became a permanent fixture of Liverpool's U21 Premier League side and at the end of the season won Liverpool's Academy Player of the Year award.

==== 2013–14 season ====
During the 2013–14 season Rossiter trained regularly with the first team squad and was named on the bench for the first time for a Premier League match against Chelsea on 29 December 2013. He also claimed a place on the bench in the New Years Day victory against Hull.

==== 2014–15 season ====
On 23 September 2014, Rossiter made his first team debut aged 17 in a League Cup third round match against Middlesbrough, scoring his first goal for the club with a low drive from 30 yards in the 10th minute to become Liverpool's second youngest goalscorer behind Michael Owen. On 28 October, Rossiter was an unused substitute in the next round of the League Cup in a match against Swansea which Liverpool won 2–1 thanks to the late header from Dejan Lovren in injury time. He also made the bench in the Reds' 1–0 league victory over Sunderland at the Stadium of Light on 10 January. He was an unused substitute in Liverpool's 1–1 draw against Chelsea in the League Cup semi final 1st leg on 20 January 2015. On 2 February 2015, Rossiter suffered an ankle injury in a FA Youth Cup game against Birmingham City that left him on the sidelines for the rest of the season.

==== 2015–16 season ====
On 11 July 2015, Rossiter was named in Liverpool's 30-man squad for their pre-season tour of Thailand, Australia and Malaysia. On 22 August, Brendan Rodgers stated Rossiter had become a valuable member of Liverpool's first team squad and would not be leaving the club on loan. On 24 August, Rossiter made his league debut, coming-on as 76th-minute substitute for Lucas Leiva in an away match against Arsenal at the Emirates Stadium.

Rossiter made his European debut for the club on 17 September 2015 in the UEFA Europa League group stage game against Bordeaux. He started the match and played for 80 minutes before being replaced by Cameron Brannagan. The match finished 1–1.

On 16 October 2015, it was reported that Rossiter had contracted a hamstring injury while on international duty. Liverpool manager Jürgen Klopp later confirmed that he was not expected back in action until mid-November. Rossiter returned from injury in December featuring in a Europa League match against Sion, however his hamstring was aggravated again during the match leading to another extended period on the sidelines. On 6 May 2016, reports emerged that he would leave Liverpool at the end of the season to join Rangers.

=== Rangers ===
On 13 May 2016, Rangers confirmed that Rossiter had signed a pre-contract agreement to join the club on a four-year deal upon the expiry of his Liverpool contract that summer. Rangers agreed to pay Rossiter's former club a £250,000 development fee. Rossiter made his debut for Rangers as a second-half substitute against Stranraer in the League Cup on 25 July 2016. Rossiter suffered a calf injury at the end of August and spent nearly four months out, despite Rangers manager Mark Warburton suggesting he was "7 to 10 days away" on several occasions. After five months on the sidelines, in February 2017, Rangers sent Rossiter south to receive treatment at England's St George's Park National Football Centre for a lower back issue which was causing recurring calf and hamstring injuries.

In May 2017, after eight months out injured, Rangers manager Pedro Caixinha revealed Rossiter should be fit for the start of pre-season training. He featured in the early stages of Rangers' campaign, including once in the Europa League against Progrès Niederkorn before injury once again ruled him out for the majority of the season. He scored his first goal for the club on 13 May 2018, in a 5–5 draw with Hibernian.

==== Bury (loan) ====
On 31 January 2019, Rossiter joined League Two side Bury on loan for the rest of the season. He scored his first and only goal for the club on the last day of the season in a 1–1 draw against Port Vale shortly after Bury had secured promotion.

==== Fleetwood (loan) ====
On 8 July 2019, Rossiter joined League One team Fleetwood Town on a season long loan.

=== Fleetwood Town ===
Rossiter signed permanently from Rangers on 3 August 2020, he signed on a one-year deal, with an option to extend a further year. Rossiter had not featured due to an injury sustained in November 2019, finally returning to the first-team in an EFL Trophy tie twelve months later.

In March 2021, Rossiter extended his contract with the club until the summer of 2023. Ahead of the 2021–22 season, Rossiter was named club captain. Rossiter only featured ten times however before an injury sustained in October 2021 ruled him out for the remainder of the season as Fleetwood survived relegation on the final day.

=== Bristol Rovers ===
On 21 June 2022, Rossiter joined newly promoted League One club Bristol Rovers on a two-year deal for an undisclosed fee, linking back up with Joey Barton, the manager who had signed him previously at Fleetwood. Rossiter made his debut on the opening day of the season as Rovers fell to a late 2–1 defeat to fellow promoted side Forest Green Rovers. In August 2022, Rossiter received a three-match ban for violent conduct after admitting an FA charge relating to an incident missed by the referee in a draw with Shrewsbury Town. Having become a key player in the midfield for Rovers, Rossiter was ruled out for a couple of months with a meniscus injury sustained in an EFL Trophy victory over Milton Keynes Dons in December 2022, putting aside initial fears that he had sustained an Anterior Cruciate Ligament injury. In February 2023, he underwent a surgery to remove fluid from his knee that would rule him out for a further number of weeks, potentially ending his season should he have another minor setback.

Having failed to feature toward the end of the previous season, Rossiter's enforced absence across pre-season was expected to continue into the 2023–24 season. In November 2023, interim manager Andy Mangan confirmed that Rossiter was nearing a return from injury and that he was being used in a coaching capacity for the foreseeable future. In January 2024 however, new manager Matt Taylor admitted that he wasn't planning to have the midfielder available for the remainder of the season. On 6 April 2024, Rossiter was named on the bench in a 2–0 defeat to Bolton Wanderers, his first inclusion in a matchday squad since December 2022. The following week, he made his first appearance, playing the first 51 minutes of a 3–1 victory over Cheltenham Town. Following his return to the team, he revealed that the sixteen-month period he had spent on the sidelines was as a result of a one-in-ten-thousand infection that had occurred during a routine knee surgery, the initial injury having only estimated to have him ruled out for a period of four-to-six weeks. He was offered a new contract in May 2024. On 1 July 2024, the club confirmed that he had departed the club having been unable to agree a new deal.

=== Shrewsbury Town ===
On 30 July 2024, Rossiter joined fellow League One side Shrewsbury Town on a one-year deal following a successful trial. Prior to signing for the club, he had also spent time on trial with Stockport County.

==== Oldham Athletic (loan) ====
On 10 January 2025, Rossiter joined National League side Oldham Athletic on loan for the remainder of the season.

On 7 May 2025, Shrewsbury announced the player would be leaving the club in June when his contract expired.

=== Waterford ===
On 14 July 2025, Rossiter signed for League of Ireland Premier Division club Waterford. He made 10 appearances in all competitions before being released at the end of the season in November 2025.

=== Sporting JAX ===
On 6 January 2026, Rossiter signed for USL Championship club Sporting JAX ahead of their inaugural season.

== International career ==
Rossiter has represented England at U16, U17, U18 and U19 level. He captained England U16 as they won the 2012 Victory Shield. In November 2013, Rossiter was described as one of the "fab four" Liverpudlian players who were at the heart of the England U17 squad. Rossiter represented England U17 in the 2014 Algarve Tournament, with England coming second to Germany after a 1–0 loss in the final game.

In September 2014 Rossiter received his first England U18 call-up for a double-header against the Netherlands, and made his U18 debut in a 4–1 victory. On 27 August 2015, Rossiter received his first call up for the England U19 team and played 90 minutes in a 3–2 away win over Germany.

== Career statistics ==
As of match played on 26 September 2025

Appearances and goals by club, season and competition
Club	Season	League			National Cup (Note: Includes FA Cup, Scottish Cup, FAI Cup & U.S. Open Cup)		League Cup (Note: Includes EFL Cup, Scottish League Cup & USL Cup)		Other		Total	
Club	Season	Division	Apps	Goals	Apps	Goals	Apps	Goals	Apps	Goals	Apps	Goals
Liverpool	2014–15	Premier League	0	0	0	0	1	1	0	0	1	1
Liverpool	2015–16	Premier League	1	0	0	0	0	0	3 (Note: Appearances in UEFA Europa League)	0	4	0
Liverpool	Total		1	0	0	0	1	1	3	0	5	1
Rangers	2016–17	Scottish Premiership	4	0	0	0	2	0	0	0	6	0
Rangers	2017–18	Scottish Premiership	2	1	0	0	1	0	2	0	5	1
Rangers	2018–19	Scottish Premiership	4	0	0	0	1	0	0	0	5	0
Rangers	2019–20	Scottish Premiership	0	0	0	0	0	0	0	0	0	0
Rangers	Total		10	1	0	0	4	0	2	0	16	1
Bury (loan)	2018–19	League Two	16	1	0	0	0	0	1 (Note: Appearance(s) in EFL Trophy)	0	17	1
Fleetwood Town (loan)	2019–20	League One	15	0	1	0	1	0	2	0	19	0
Fleetwood Town	2020–21	League One	35	1	0	0	0	0	1	0	36	1
Fleetwood Town	2021–22	League One	10	0	0	0	0	0	0	0	10	0
Fleetwood Town	Total		45	1	0	0	0	0	1	0	46	1
Bristol Rovers	2022–23	League One	17	0	1	0	0	0	3	0	21	0
Bristol Rovers	2023–24	League One	4	0	0	0	0	0	0	0	4	0
Bristol Rovers	Total		21	0	1	0	0	0	3	0	25	0
Shrewsbury Town	2024–25	League One	15	0	0	0	1	0	1	0	17	0
Oldham Athletic (loan)	2024–25	National League	21	0	–		–		3 (Note: Appearances in 2025 National League Playoffs)	0	24	0
Waterford	2025	LOI Premier Division	8	0	2	0	–		0	0	10	0
Sporting JAX	2026	USL Championship	0	0	0	0	0	0	–		0	0
Career total			152	3	4	0	7	1	16	0	179	4

== Honours ==
Bury

- EFL League Two second-place promotion: 2018–19

Oldham Athletic

- National League play-offs: 2025

England U16

- Victory Shield: 2012

Individual

- Liverpool Academy Player of the Season: 2013–14
