= 2020–21 Fleetwood Town F.C. season =

Fleetwood Town
2020–21 season
- Chairman: Andrew Pilley
- Manager: Joey Barton (until 4 January); Simon Grayson (from 31 January)
- Stadium: Highbury Stadium
- League One: 15th
- FA Cup: First round
- EFL Cup: Third round
- EFL Trophy: Third round
- Top goalscorer: League: Callum Camps (9 goals); All: Callum Camps (11 goals)
Home colours	Away colours

The 2020–21 season was the 113th season of Fleetwood Town and the seventh consecutive season in League One, following their play-off semi-final defeat to Wycombe Wanderers during the previous season. Along with League One, the club also participated in the FA Cup, EFL Cup and EFL Trophy.

== Background ==
During the previous campaign, Fleetwood finished 6th in the incomplete League One season and qualified for the play-offs. However, they were eliminated 6–3 on aggregate in the semi-finals by Wycombe Wanderers. Manager Joey Barton retained his role as manager from the previous season.

== Transfers ==
=== Transfers in ===
Date	Position	Nationality	Name	From	Fee	Ref.
1 August 2020	CM	(Northern Ireland)	Callum Camps	(England) Rochdale	Free transfer	
3 August 2020	CM	(England)	Jordan Rossiter	(Scotland) Rangers	Free transfer	
20 August 2020	GK	(England)	Joel Coleman	(England) Huddersfield Town	Free transfer	
4 September 2020	RM	(England)	Mark Duffy	(England) Sheffield United	Free transfer	
9 September 2020	CB	(England)	Sam Stubbs	(England) Middlesbrough	Undisclosed	
11 September 2020	GK	(Canada)	Jayson Leutwiler	(England) Blackburn Rovers	Free transfer	
18 September 2020	CM	(England)	Sam Finley	(England) Accrington Stanley	Free transfer	
13 October 2020	RB	(Northern Ireland)	Jake Wallace	(Northern Ireland) Glentoran	Undisclosed	
1 February 2021	CM	(England)	Daniel Batty	(England) Hull City	Free transfer	
2 February 2021	RM	(Northern Ireland)	Chris Conn-Clarke	(England) Burnley	Undisclosed	

=== Loans in ===
Date from	Position	Nationality	Name	From	Date until	Ref.
12 August 2020	CB	(Wales)	Morgan Boyes	(England) Liverpool	2 January 2021	
25 September 2020	LW	(Scotland)	Barrie McKay	(Wales) Swansea City	End of season	
15 October 2020	RB	(England)	Tom Edwards	(England) Stoke City	End of season	
16 October 2020	DM	(England)	Callum Connolly	(England) Everton	End of season	
16 October 2020	CB	(Scotland)	Charlie Mulgrew	(England) Blackburn Rovers	End of season	
12 January 2021	GK	(England)	Joe Hilton	(England) Blackburn Rovers	19 January 2021	
15 January 2021	CF	(Northern Ireland)	Kyle Vassell	(England) Rotherham United	End of season	
22 January 2021	RB	(Saint Lucia)	Janoi Donacien	(England) Ipswich Town	End of season	

=== Loans out ===
Date from	Position	Nationality	Name	To	Date until	Ref.
7 July 2020	CB	(England)	Nathan Sheron	(Scotland) St Mirren	29 January 2021	
3 August 2020	GK	(England)	Billy Crellin	(England) Bolton Wanderers	End of season	
21 August 2020	CF	(England)	Michael Fowler	(England) FC United of Manchester	End of season	
28 August 2020	CM	(England)	Harrison Biggins	(England) Barrow	1 February 2021	
19 October 2020	MF	(Northern Ireland)	Carl Johnston	(England) Farsley Celtic	14 November 2020	
25 October 2020	CF	(England)	Gerard Garner	(England) Gateshead	30 December 2020	
18 December 2020	DF	(Northern Ireland)	Dylan Boyle	(England) FC United of Manchester		
18 December 2020	CB	(England)	Harrison Holgate	(England) Altrincham	16 January 2021	
6 January 2021	CF	(Wales)	Ched Evans	(England) Preston North End	6 February 2021	
21 January 2021	CM	(Scotland)	Paul Coutts	(England) Salford City	End of season	
21 January 2021	MF	(England)	Jay Matete	(England) Grimsby Town	End of season	
22 April 2021	CF	(England)	Harvey Saunders	(England) Hartlepool United	End of season	

=== Transfers out ===
Date	Position	Nationality	Name	To	Fee	Ref.
1 July 2020	MF	(England)	Jamie Cooke	(England) Colne	Free transfer	
1 July 2020	GK	(England)	James Cottam	Unattached	Released	
1 July 2020	CM	(England)	Kyle Dempsey	(England) Gillingham	Released	
1 July 2020	GK	(Scotland)	Matt Gilks	(England) Bolton Wanderers	Released	
1 July 2020	CM	(England)	Dean Marney	Unattached	Released	
1 July 2020	CF	(England)	Conor McAleny	(England) Oldham Athletic	Released	
1 July 2020	MF	(England)	Anthony Williams	(England) Stalybridge Celtic	Free transfer	
17 July 2020	LW	(England)	Ashley Hunter	(England) Salford City	Undisclosed	
31 July 2020	GK	(Northern Ireland)	Scott Pengelly	(Northern Ireland) Portadown	Undisclosed	
7 August 2020	RB	(England)	Lewie Coyle	(England) Hull City	Undisclosed	
14 October 2020	LB	(England)	Eddie Clarke	(England) Warrington Town	Mutual consent	
2 September 2020	RB	(Wales)	Macauley Southam-Hales	(England) Stockport County	Free transfer	
18 September 2020	CM	(England)	Jack Sowerby	(England) Northampton Town	Undisclosed	
8 January 2021	GK	(Canada)	Jayson Leutwiler	(England) Huddersfield Town	Released	
21 January 2021	CB	(England)	Sam Stubbs	(England) Exeter City	Free transfer	
6 February 2021	CF	(Wales)	Ched Evans	(England) Preston North End	Undisclosed	
16 March 2021	CF	(Republic of Ireland)	Paddy Madden	(England) Stockport County	Undisclosed	

== Pre-season ==
11 August 2020 Friendly	Fleetwood Town	4–2	Carlisle United	Thornton-Cleveleys
13:00 BST	Evans 38'; McDonald 51' (o.g.); Garner 60'; Morris 70'	Report	Alessandra 5'; Mellish 43'	Stadium: Poolfoot Farm; Attendance: 0 Referee: Sam Barrott

15 August 2020 Friendly	Stockport County	0–2	Fleetwood Town	Stockport
15:30 BST		Report	Morris 15'; Madden 37' (pen.)	Stadium: Edgeley Park; Attendance: 0

18 August 2020 Friendly	Fleetwood Town	1–2	Port Vale	Thornton-Cleveleys
15:00 BST	Saunders	Report	Conlon; Brown (pen.)	Stadium: Poolfoot Farm; Attendance: 0

22 August 2020 Friendly	Fleetwood Town	1–4	Blackburn Rovers	Fleetwood
13:00 BST	Evans 14'	Report	Chapman 26'; Armstrong 46', 68'; Brennan 78'	Stadium: Highbury Stadium; Attendance: 0

== Competitions ==
=== EFL League One ===
==== League table ====
Pos	Team	Pld	W	D	L	GF	GA	GD	Pts
11	Accrington Stanley	46	18	13	15	63	68	−5	67
12	Crewe Alexandra	46	18	12	16	56	61	−5	66
13	Milton Keynes Dons	46	18	11	17	64	62	+2	65
14	Doncaster Rovers	46	19	7	20	63	67	−4	64
15	Fleetwood Town	46	16	12	18	49	46	+3	60
16	Burton Albion	46	15	12	19	61	73	−12	57
17	Shrewsbury Town	46	13	15	18	50	57	−7	54
18	Plymouth Argyle	46	14	11	21	53	80	−27	53
19	AFC Wimbledon	46	12	15	19	54	70	−16	51

Source: EFL Official Website
Rules for classification: 1) Points; 2) Goal difference; 3) Number of goals scored; 4) Head-to-head results; 5) Wins; 6) Away goals; 7) Penalty points (sec 9.5); 8) 12-point sending off offences

==== Results summary ====
Overall								Home						Away					
Pld	W	D	L	GF	GA	GD	Pts	W	D	L	GF	GA	GD	W	D	L	GF	GA	GD
46	16	12	18	49	46	+3	60	9	8	6	26	17	+9	7	4	12	23	29	−6

Last updated: 9 May 2021.
Source: BBC

==== Results by matchday ====
Matchday	1	2	3	4	5	6	7	8	9	10	11	12	13	14	15	16	17	18	19	20	21	22	23	24	25	26	27	28	29	30	31	32	33	34	35	36	37	38	39	40	41	42	43	44	45	46
Ground	H	A	H	A	H	H	A	A	H	H	A	A	H	H	A	H	A	A	H	A	H	A	A	H	A	H	H	A	H	A	H	A	A	H	A	H	H	H	A	H	A	H	A	A	H	A
Result	W	L	L	L	W	D	L	W	W	W	L	W	W	D	L	L	W	D	D	D	L	L	D	D	L	D	W	L	D	L	D	W	W	W	D	W	L	L	W	W	L	L	W	L	D	L
Position	7	12	12	21	14	14	15	12	10	9	10	8	7	7	8	10	9	10	10	10	11	12	12	14	14	15	13	15	16	17	16	16	15	14	14	11	15	16	15	13	14	15	14	15	15	15

Updated to match(es) played on 9 May 2021. Source: 11v11 for league tables and fixtures
A = Away; H = Home; W = Win; D = Draw; L = Loss

==== Matches ====
Win Draw Loss Postponed

The 2020–21 season fixtures were released on 21 August.

12 September 2020 1	Fleetwood Town	2–1	Burton Albion	Fleetwood
15:00 BST	Camps 17'; Burns (yellow card) 19'; Madden 79'; Whelan (yellow card) 84'	Report	Brayford 66'; Bostwick (yellow card) 70'; O'Toole (red card) 90+5'	Stadium: Highbury Stadium; Attendance: 0 Referee: Martin Coy

19 September 2020 2	Peterborough United	2–1	Fleetwood Town	Peterborough
15:00 BST	Kent (yellow card) 49'; Thompson (yellow card) 63'; Taylor 90+1'; Szmodics 90+5'	Report	Camps 55'; Burns (yellow card) 57'	Stadium: Weston Homes Stadium; Attendance: 0 Referee: Chris Sarginson

26 September 2020 3	Fleetwood Town	0–1	AFC Wimbledon	Fleetwood
15:00 BST	Andrew (yellow card) 55'; Duffy (yellow card) 59'	Report	Kalambayi (yellow card) 34'; Seddon 41' (yellow card) 82'; McLoughlin (yellow card) 55'	Stadium: Highbury Stadium; Attendance: 0 Referee: Michael Salisbury

3 October 2020 4	Rochdale	2–1	Fleetwood Town	Spotland
15:00 BST	Lund 13'; Beesley (yellow card) 39'; Tavares 90'	Report	Hill (yellow card) 54'; Saunders 77'; Evans (yellow card) 90+1'	Stadium: Spotland Stadium; Attendance: 0 Referee: James Oldham

9 October 2020 5	Fleetwood Town	4–1	Hull City	Fleetwood
19:45 BST	Saunders 17', 67'; Camps 47' (yellow card) 90+3'; Stubbs 73'	Report	Honeyman 21'	Stadium: Highbury Stadium; Attendance: 0 Referee: Ollie Yates

17 October 2020 6	Fleetwood Town	0–0	Lincoln City	Fleetwood
15:00 BST		Report	Bridcutt (yellow card) 21'; Montsma (yellow card) 90+1'	Stadium: Highbury Stadium; Attendance: 0 Referee: Anthony Backhouse

20 October 2020 7	Accrington Stanley	1–0	Fleetwood Town	Accrington
19:00 BST	Sykes (yellow card) 55'; Charles 73'	Report	Holgate (yellow card) 43'	Stadium: Wham Stadium; Attendance: 0 Referee: Darren Drysdale

24 October 2020 8	Gillingham	0–2	Fleetwood Town	Gillingham
13:00 BST	Ogilvie (yellow card) 17' (yellow-red card) 83'; Akinde (yellow card) 41'; Samuel (yellow card) 70'; Graham (yellow card) 90+4'	Report	Madden 66'; Matete (yellow card) 87'; Evans 90+3'	Stadium: Priestfield Stadium; Attendance: 0 Referee: John Busby

27 October 2020 9	Fleetwood Town	1–0	Shrewsbury Town	Fleetwood
19:45 GMT	Evans 25' (yellow card) 36'	Report	Daniels (yellow card) 59'	Stadium: Highbury Stadium; Attendance: 0 Referee: Bobby Madley

31 October 2020 10	Fleetwood Town	2–0	Oxford United	Fleetwood
15:00 GMT	Camps 1'; Madden 76'; Duffy (yellow card) 90+4'	Report	Henry (penalty missed) 10'; Ruffels (yellow card) 53'; Long (yellow card) 87'	Stadium: Highbury Stadium; Attendance: 0 Referee: Robert Lewis

3 November 2020 11	Charlton Athletic	3–2	Fleetwood Town	Charlton
19:00 GMT	Purrington 4'; Washington 31', 50' (pen.); Maatsen (yellow card) 86'	Report	Evans 33', 34'; Finley (yellow card) 90+4'	Stadium: The Valley; Attendance: 0 Referee: Christopher Pollard

14 November 2020 12	Bristol Rovers	1–4	Fleetwood Town	Horfield
15:00 GMT	Harries (yellow card) 27'; Grant 60'; Ehmer (yellow card) 79'; Hanlan (yellow card) 90+1'	Report	Camps 30', 82'; Madden 39' (yellow card) 70'; Edwards (yellow card) 43'; Evans 86' (pen.); Leutwiler (yellow card) 90'	Stadium: Memorial Stadium; Attendance: 0 Referee: Antony Coggins

21 November 2020 13	Fleetwood Town	5–1	Plymouth Argyle	Fleetwood
15:00 GMT	Finley 4'; Camps 7', 67'; Andrew (yellow card) 24'; Burns 38'; Mulgrew 55'	Report	Canavan (yellow card) 52' (yellow-red card) 90+1'; Edwards (yellow card) 74'; Jephcott 84'; Nouble (yellow card) 90+2'	Stadium: Highbury Stadium; Attendance: 0 Referee: Sam Barrott

27 November 2020 14	Fleetwood Town	1–1	Sunderland	Fleetwood
19:45 GMT	Morris (yellow card) 6'; Andrew (yellow card) 48'; Connolly 74'; Whelan (yellow card) 90'; Evans (yellow card) 90+2'	Report	Scowen (yellow card) 24'; Wyke 59'; Wright (yellow card) 75'	Stadium: Highbury Stadium; Attendance: 0 Referee: Bobby Madley

1 December 2020 15	Northampton Town	1–0	Fleetwood Town	Northampton
19:45 GMT	Sowerby (yellow card) 13'; McWilliams (yellow card) 43'; Bolger 47'; Harriman (yellow card) 60'; Arnold (yellow card) 90+3'	Report	Coutts (yellow card) 8'; Camps (yellow card) 34'; Whelan (yellow card) 66'	Stadium: PTS Academy Stadium; Attendance: 0 Referee: James Adcock

5 December 2020 16	Fleetwood Town	0–1	Blackpool	Fleetwood
15:00 GMT		Report	Madine 16'	Stadium: Highbury Stadium; Attendance: 0 Referee: John Busby

12 December 2020 17	Swindon Town	0–1	Fleetwood Town	Swindon
15:00 GMT	Hope (yellow card) 35'; Grounds (yellow card) 61'	Report	Madden 29'; Camps (yellow card) 57'; Connolly (yellow card) 82'; Duffy (yellow card) 90+3'	Stadium: The County Ground; Attendance: 2,000; Referee: Christopher Pollard

15 December 2020 18	Portsmouth	0–0	Fleetwood Town	Milton
19:45 GMT	Curtis (yellow card) 12'; Whatmough (yellow card) 31'; Williams (yellow card) 34'; Harness (yellow card) 41'	Report	Madden (yellow card) 31'; Andrew (yellow card) 41'; Burns (yellow card) 45+1'; Duffy (yellow card) 90+4'	Stadium: Fratton Park; Attendance: 2,000; Referee: Alan Young

19 December 2020 19	Fleetwood Town	1–1	Wigan Athletic	Fleetwood
15:00 GMT	Andrew 28'; Leutwiler (yellow card) 77'; Rossiter (yellow card) 87'; Madden (yellow card) 90+4'	Report	Naismith (yellow card) 37'; Crankshaw 90+1'	Stadium: Highbury Stadium; Attendance: 0 Referee: James Oldham

26 December 2020 20	Crewe Alexandra	1–1	Fleetwood Town	Crewe
15:00 GMT	Beckles (yellow card) 16'; Dale (yellow card) 23'; Offord (yellow card) 42'; Mandron 61'	Report	Andrew (yellow card) 38'; Burns 49'; Rossiter (yellow card) 60'; Madden (yellow card) 77' Barton (yellow card)	Stadium: Alexandra Stadium; Attendance: 0 Referee: Tom Nield

16 January 2021 21	Fleetwood Town	0–1	Portsmouth	Fleetwood
15:00 GMT		Report	Marquis 16'; Whatmough (yellow card) 36'	Stadium: Highbury Stadium; Attendance: 0 Referee: James Bell

19 January 2021 22	Milton Keynes Dons	3–1	Fleetwood Town	Denbigh, Milton Keynes
19:00 GMT	Mason 4', 21', 28'; Freeman (yellow card) 90+2'	Report	Coutts (yellow card) 34'; Finley (yellow card) 65', (goal) 83'; Madden (yellow card) 82'	Stadium: Stadium:mk; Attendance: 0 Referee: Antony Coggins

23 January 2021 23	Wigan Athletic	0–0	Fleetwood Town	Wigan
15:00 GMT		Report		Stadium: DW Stadium; Attendance: 0 Referee: Declan Bourne

26 January 2021 24	Fleetwood Town	0–0	Northampton Town	Fleetwood
19:45 GMT	Morris (yellow card) 88'	Report		Stadium: Highbury Stadium; Attendance: 0 Referee: Martin Coy

30 January 2021 25	Oxford United	1–0	Fleetwood Town	Oxford
15:00 GMT	Ruffels 28'; Rodríguez (yellow card) 38'; Winnall (yellow card) 66'; Agyei (yellow card) 76'	Report	Mulgrew (red card) 6'; Andrew (yellow card) 82'	Stadium: The Kassam Stadium; Attendance: 0 Referee: Sam Barrott

6 February 2021 26	Fleetwood Town	0–0	Bristol Rovers	Fleetwood
15:00 GMT	Batty (yellow card) 20'	Report	Ehmer (yellow card) 63'	Stadium: Highbury Stadium; Attendance: 0 Referee: Seb Stockbridge

9 February 2021 27	Fleetwood Town	3–1	Doncaster Rovers	Fleetwood
19:45 GMT	Vassell 60'; Madden 66'; Andrew 88'	Report	Lokilo 8'	Stadium: Highbury Stadium; Attendance: 0 Referee: Andy Haines

13 February 2021 28	Plymouth Argyle	1–0	Fleetwood Town	Plymouth
15:00 GMT	Holgate 11' (o.g.); Opoku (yellow card) 49'	Report	Finley (yellow card) 77'; Saunders (yellow card) 90+1' Simon Grayson (yellow card)	Stadium: Home Park; Attendance: 0 Referee: Thomas Bramall

20 February 2021 29	Fleetwood Town	1–1	Charlton Athletic	Fleetwood
15:00 GMT	Madden 41', (yellow card) 78'; Rossiter (yellow card) 78'	Report	Stockley 6', (yellow card) 78'; Pratley (yellow card) 47'; Oshilaja (yellow card) 79'; Millar (yellow card) 90+3'	Stadium: Highbury Stadium; Attendance: 0 Referee: Carl Boyeson

23 February 2021 30	Sunderland	2–0	Fleetwood Town	Sunderland
19:00 GMT	Sanderson (yellow card) 38'; O'Brien 61'; Power 82'; McLaughlin (yellow card) 90'	Report		Stadium: Stadium of Light; Attendance: 0 Referee: James Bell

27 February 2021 31	Fleetwood Town	1–1	Accrington Stanley	Fleetwood
15:00 GMT	Burns (yellow card) 4', (goal) 24'; Camps (yellow card) 45+3'; Morris (penalty missed) 79'; Connolly (yellow card) 79'	Report	Phillips 22'; Burgess (yellow card) 78'	Stadium: Highbury Stadium; Attendance: 0 Referee: Sam Allison

2 March 2021 32	Lincoln City	1–2	Fleetwood Town	Lincoln
19:00 GMT	Morton 71'	Report	Andrew (yellow card) 32'; Garner 43'; Camps 53'	Stadium: LNER Stadium; Attendance: 0 Referee: David Rock

6 March 2021 33	Shrewsbury Town	0–2	Fleetwood Town	Shrewsbury
15:00 GMT		Report	Burns 45'; Vassell 70'	Stadium: Montgomery Waters Meadow; Attendance: 0 Referee: Michael Salisbury

9 March 2021 34	Fleetwood Town	1–0	Gillingham	Fleetwood
19:45 GMT	Vassell 2' (pen.), (yellow card) 90+3'	Report	O'Keefe (yellow card) 90+3'; Oliver (yellow card) 90+5'	Stadium: Highbury Stadium; Attendance: 0 Referee: Marc Edwards

13 March 2021 35	Blackpool	0–0	Fleetwood Town	Blackpool
15:00 GMT	Kaikai (yellow card) 19'; Dougall (yellow card) 36'	Report	Batty (yellow card) 26'; Burns (yellow card) 55'; Andrew (yellow card) 76'; Connolly (yellow card) 90+1'	Stadium: Bloomfield Road; Attendance: 0 Referee: Will Finnie

16 March 2021 36	Fleetwood Town	2–0	Ipswich Town	Fleetwood
19:45 GMT	Connolly 9'; Garner 57'; Batty (yellow card) 80'; Cairns (yellow card) 90'	Report	Edwards (yellow card) 45+4'	Stadium: Highbury Stadium; Attendance: 0 Referee: Gavin Ward

20 March 2021 37	Fleetwood Town	0–2	Swindon Town	Fleetwood
15:00 GMT	Finley (yellow card) 11'; Hill (yellow card) 76'	Report	Twine 5', 60', (yellow card) 75'	Stadium: Highbury Stadium; Attendance: 0 Referee: Chris Sarginson

2 April 2021 38	Fleetwood Town	0–1	Peterborough United	Fleetwood
15:00 BST	Connolly (yellow card) 25'	Report	Clarke-Harris 89'	Stadium: Highbury Stadium; Attendance: 0 Referee: Ben Speedie

5 April 2021 39	AFC Wimbledon	0–1	Fleetwood Town	Wimbledon
15:00 BST	Heneghan (yellow card) 41'; Alexander (yellow card) 42'	Report	Connolly (yellow card) 12'; Burns (yellow card) 77'; Camps (yellow card) 86'; McKay 88'	Stadium: Plough Lane; Attendance: 0 Referee: Peter Wright

10 April 2021 40	Fleetwood Town	1–0	Rochdale	Fleetwood
15:00 BST	O'Connell 52' (o.g.); Connolly (yellow card) 66'	Report	McLaughlin (yellow card) 54'	Stadium: Highbury Stadium; Attendance: 0 Referee: Bobby Madley

17 April 2021 41	Hull City	2–1	Fleetwood Town	Kingston upon Hull
12:30 BST	Magennis 61'; Lewis-Potter 70'	Report	Donacien (yellow card) 6'; Vassell 22'	Stadium: KCOM Stadium; Attendance: 0 Referee: Ollie Yates

20 April 2021 42	Fleetwood Town	0–2	Crewe Alexandra	Fleetwood
19:45 BST	Connolly (yellow card) 14'; Vassell (penalty missed) 27'; Andrew (yellow card) 69'; Baggley (yellow card) 76'	Report	Dale 24'; Adebisi (yellow card) 45+4'; Murphy (yellow card) 54'; Porter 83' (pen.)	Stadium: Highbury Stadium; Attendance: 0 Referee: Ross Joyce

24 April 2021 43	Doncaster Rovers	0–1	Fleetwood Town	Doncaster
15:00 BST		Report	Rossiter (yellow card) 47'; McKay 51'	Stadium: The Keepmoat Stadium; Attendance: 0 Referee: Sam Barrott

27 April 2021 44	Burton Albion	5–2	Fleetwood Town	Burton upon Trent
19:00 BST	Earl (yellow card) 27'; Akins 35'; Powell 39'; Hamer 72'; Hemmings (yellow card) 74', (goal) 85', 90+5'; Taylor (yellow card) 78'	Report	Biggins (yellow card) 45+4'; Finley 62'; Rossiter 90+2'	Stadium: Pirelli Stadium; Attendance: 0 Referee: Anthony Backhouse

1 May 2021 45	Fleetwood Town	1–1	Milton Keynes Dons	Fleetwood
15:00 BST	Garner 61'; Burns (yellow card) 88'	Report	Kasumu (yellow card) 16'; Sorinola (yellow card) 68'; Brown 83'; Lewington (yellow card) 90+2'	Stadium: Highbury Stadium; Attendance: 0 Referee: Stephen Martin

9 May 2021 46	Ipswich Town	3–1	Fleetwood Town	Ipswich
12:00 BST	Norwood 3'; Edwards 9'; Parrott 29'	Report	Finley (yellow card) 51'; Burns 72'; Rossiter (yellow card) 80'	Stadium: Portman Road; Attendance: 0 Referee: John Busby

=== FA Cup ===
The draw for the first round was made on Monday 26, October.

Win Draw Loss

7 November 2020 First round	Hull City	2–0	Fleetwood Town	Kingston upon Hull
15:00 GMT	Magennis 31'; Burke 63'; Smallwood (yellow card) 90+4'	Report	Connolly (yellow card) 58'; Madden (yellow card) 66'; Holgate (yellow card) 88'	Stadium: KCOM Stadium; Attendance: 0 Referee: Marc Edwards

=== EFL Cup ===
Win Draw Loss

The first round draw was made on 18 August, live on Sky Sports, by Paul Merson. The draw for both the second and third round were confirmed on September 6, live on Sky Sports by Phil Babb.

5 September 2020 First round	Fleetwood Town	3–2	Wigan Athletic	Fleetwood
15:00 BST	Saunders (yellow card) 29'; Evans 41', 77'; Morris 64'	Report	Garner 2', 31' (pen.); Obi (yellow card) 37'; Evans (yellow card) 72'	Stadium: Highbury Stadium; Attendance: 0 Referee: Seb Stockbridge

15 September 2020 Second round	Fleetwood Town	2–1	Port Vale	Fleetwood
19:00 BST	Madden 14' (yellow card) 32'; Morris 75'; Whelan (yellow card) 90+2'	Report	Hurst (yellow card) 45+1'; Whitehead 49'; Montaño (yellow card) 64'; Brisley (yellow card) 70'; Mills (yellow card) 78'	Stadium: Highbury Stadium; Attendance: 0 Referee: Ross Joyce

23 September 2020 Third round	Fleetwood Town	2–5	Everton	Fleetwood
19:45 BST	Duffy 48'; Camps 58'	Report	Richarlison 22', 34'; Delph (yellow card) 26'; Iwobi 49'; Bernard 73'; Kean 90+4'	Stadium: Highbury Stadium; Attendance: 0 Referee: Jeremy Simpson

=== EFL Trophy ===
Win Draw Loss

The regional group stage draw was confirmed on 18 August. The second round draw was made by Matt Murray on 20 November, at St Andrew's. The third round was made on 10 December 2020 by Jon Parkin.

Pos	Div	Team	Pld	W	PW	PL	L	GF	GA	GD	Pts	Qualification
1	L1	Fleetwood Town	3	3	0	0	0	8	2	+6	9	Advance to Round 2
2	L1	Sunderland	3	2	0	0	1	14	6	+8	6	Advance to Round 2
3	L2	Carlisle United	3	1	0	0	2	7	9	−2	3	
4	ACA	Aston Villa U21	3	0	0	0	3	2	14	−12	0	

Source: EFL.com

1 September 2020 Group stage	Carlisle United	1–3	Fleetwood Town	Carlisle
19:00 BST	Toure 36' (red card) 90'	Report	Camps 44'; Saunders 57', 68'	Stadium: Brunton Park; Attendance: 0 Referee: Ben Speedie

6 October 2020 Group stage	Fleetwood Town	3–0	Aston Villa U21	Fleetwood
19:45 BST	Saunders 3', 4', 15'; Matete (yellow card) 63'; Smith (yellow card) 75'	Report	Revan (yellow card) 26'; Barry (yellow card) 75'	Stadium: Highbury Stadium; Attendance: 0 Referee: Peter Wright

10 November 2020 Group stage	Fleetwood Town	2–1	Sunderland	Fleetwood
19:45 GMT	Smith (yellow card) 26'; McKay 51'; Duffy 59'; Morris (yellow card) 90+2'	Report	Hill 15' (o.g.); Embleton (yellow card) 62'; Willis (yellow card) 72'	Stadium: Highbury Stadium; Attendance: 0 Referee: Graham Salisbury

8 December 2020 Second round	Fleetwood Town	0–0 (5–4 p)	Blackpool	Fleetwood
19:45 GMT	Rydel (yellow card) 51'; Madden (yellow card) 77'	Report	Turton (yellow card) 39'	Stadium: Highbury Stadium; Attendance: 0 Referee: Robert Lewis
	Penalties
	Coutts (penalty scored); Madden (penalty scored); Evans (penalty scored); McKay (penalty scored); Duffy (penalty scored)		Garbutt (penalty scored); Sarkic (penalty scored); Robson (penalty missed); Lubala (penalty scored); Lawrence-Gabriel (penalty scored)

12 January 2021 Third round	Hull City	3–2	Fleetwood Town	Kingston upon Hull
17:30 GMT	Wilks 78'; Lewis-Potter 80'; Coyle 90+4'	Report	Madden 8'; Burns 53'; Hill (yellow card) 82'; Connolly (yellow card) 90'; Matete (yellow card) 90+1'	Stadium: KCOM Stadium; Attendance: 0 Referee: Ross Joyce

== Statistics ==
Players with names in italics and marked * were on loan from another club for the whole of their season with Bristol Rovers.
As of 27 February 2021

No.	Pos	Nat	Player	Total		League One		FA Cup		League Cup		League Trophy	
No.	Pos	Nat	Player	Apps	Goals	Apps	Goals	Apps	Goals	Apps	Goals	Apps	Goals
1	GK	(England) ENG	Joel Coleman	2	0	0+0	0	0+0	0	1+0	0	1+0	0
3	DF	(England) ENG	Danny Andrew	35	2	30+0	2	1+0	0	3+0	0	1+0	0
4	DF	(England) ENG	Callum Connolly*	27	1	25+0	1	1+0	0	0+0	0	1+0	0
6	MF	(Republic of Ireland) IRL	Glenn Whelan	29	0	15+7	0	1+0	0	3+0	0	2+1	0
7	FW	(Wales) WAL	Wes Burns	26	4	17+3	3	0+1	0	3+0	0	2+0	1
8	MF	(England) ENG	Mark Duffy	30	2	8+15	0	0+0	0	0+3	1	3+1	1
10	MF	(Northern Ireland) NIR	Callum Camps	36	10	26+4	8	1+0	0	3+0	1	2+0	1
11	MF	(England) ENG	Josh Morris	29	2	14+8	0	0+1	0	3+0	2	3+0	0
14	DF	(Scotland) SCO	Charlie Mulgrew*	23	1	22+1	1	0+0	0	0+0	0	0+0	0
16	MF	(England) ENG	James Rossiter	21	0	15+5	0	0+0	0	0+0	0	1+0	0
17	FW	(Republic of Ireland) IRL	Paddy Madden	32	9	24+4	7	1+0	0	1+0	1	1+1	1
18	FW	(England) ENG	Kyle Vassell*	11	1	10+1	1	0+0	0	0+0	0	0+0	0
19	FW	(Scotland) SCO	Barrie McKay*	19	1	8+9	0	0+0	0	0+0	0	1+1	1
20	FW	(England) ENG	Harvey Saunders	24	8	7+9	3	1+0	0	1+2	0	3+1	5
21	GK	(England) ENG	Alex Cairns	18	0	13+0	0	0+0	0	2+1	0	2+0	0
22	DF	(Saint Lucia) LCA	Janoi Donacien	8	0	8+0	0	0+0	0	0+0	0	0+0	0
23	MF	(England) ENG	Sam Finley	18	2	11+5	2	0+1	0	0+0	0	1+0	0
24	MF	(England) ENG	Daniel Batty	6	0	6+0	0	0+0	0	0+0	0	0+0	0
27	MF	(England) ENG	Harrison Biggins	2	0	0+2	0	0+0	0	0+0	0	0+0	0
29	FW	(England) ENG	Ged Garner	1	0	1+0	0	0+0	0	0+0	0	0+0	0
30	MF	(Northern Ireland) NIR	Barry Baggley	1	0	0+0	0	0+0	0	0+0	0	0+1	0
31	MF	(England) ENG	Laurence Smith	2	0	0+0	0	0+0	0	0+0	0	2+0	0
32	DF	(England) ENG	Harrison Holgate	17	0	8+4	0	1+0	0	1+0	0	3+0	0
33	DF	(England) ENG	James Hill	20	0	9+4	0	0+0	0	3+0	0	4+0	0
35	DF	(England) ENG	Ryan Rydel	7	0	1+2	0	0+0	0	0+0	0	4+0	0
37	MF	(Northern Ireland) NIR	Dylan Boyle	1	0	0+0	0	0+0	0	0+0	0	0+1	0
39	MF	(England) ENG	Shayden Morris	7	0	1+2	0	0+0	0	0+0	0	4+0	0
41	FW	(Republic of Ireland) IRL	Cian Hayes	1	0	0+0	0	0+0	0	0+0	0	0+1	0
43	MF	(Australia) AUS	Akiel Raffie	1	0	0+0	0	0+0	0	0+0	0	0+1	0
44	DF	(England) ENG	Sam Barratt	1	0	0+0	0	0+0	0	0+0	0	0+1	0
Players out on loan:
15	MF	(Scotland) SCO	Paul Coutts	28	0	14+6	0	1+0	0	3+0	0	4+0	0
29	FW	(England) ENG	Gerard Garner	4	0	0+1	0	0+0	0	1+0	0	2+0	0
36	MF	(England) ENG	Jay Matete	13	0	3+4	0	0+0	0	0+2	0	2+2	0
38	DF	(Northern Ireland) NIR	Carl Johnston	2	0	0+0	0	0+0	0	0+0	0	0+2	0
Players who left the club:
2	DF	(England) ENG	Tom Edwards*	12	0	10+1	0	1+0	0	0+0	0	0+0	0
9	FW	(Wales) WAL	Ched Evans	23	7	11+6	5	1+0	0	2+1	2	1+1	0
13	GK	(Canada) CAN	Jayson Leutwiler	18	0	16+0	0	1+0	0	0+0	0	1+0	0
13	GK	(England) ENG	Joe Hilton*	3	0	2+0	0	0+0	0	0+0	0	1+0	0
22	DF	(Wales) WAL	Morgan Boyes*	4	0	2+0	0	0+0	0	1+0	0	1+0	0
26	DF	(England) ENG	Sam Stubbs	9	1	5+0	1	0+0	0	2+0	0	2+0	0

=== Goals record ===
As of 27 February 2021

Rank	No.	Nat.	Po.	Name	League One	FA Cup	League Cup	League Trophy	Total
1	10	(Northern Ireland)	CM	Callum Camps	8	0	1	1	10
2	17	(Republic of Ireland)	CF	Paddy Madden	7	0	1	1	9
3	20	(England)	CF	Harvey Saunders	3	0	0	5	8
4	9	(Wales)	CF	Ched Evans	5	0	2	0	7
5	7	(Wales)	RW	Wes Burns	3	0	0	1	4
6	3	(England)	LB	Danny Andrew	2	0	0	0	2
6	8	(England)	RM	Mark Duffy	0	0	1	1	2
6	11	(England)	LM	Josh Morris	0	0	2	0	2
6	23	(England)	LM	Sam Finley	2	0	0	0	2
10	4	(England)	CB	Callum Connolly	1	0	0	0	1
10	14	(Scotland)	CB	Charlie Mulgrew	1	0	0	0	1
10	18	(England)	CF	Kyle Vassell	1	0	0	0	1
10	19	(Scotland)	CF	Barrie McKay	0	0	0	1	1
10	26	(England)	CB	Sam Stubbs	1	0	0	0	1
Total					34	0	7	10	52

==== Disciplinary record ====
As of 27 February 2021

Rank	No.	Nat.	Po.	Name	League One			FA Cup			League Cup			League Trophy			Total		
Rank	No.	Nat.	Po.	Name	Booked	(yellow card) (yellow-red card)	Sent off (straight red)	Booked	(yellow card) (yellow-red card)	Sent off (straight red)	Booked	(yellow card) (yellow-red card)	Sent off (straight red)	Booked	(yellow card) (yellow-red card)	Sent off (straight red)	Booked	(yellow card) (yellow-red card)	Sent off (straight red)
1	17	(Republic of Ireland)	CF	Paddy Madden	6	0	0	1	0	0	1	0	0	1	0	0	9	0	0
2	3	(England)	LB	Danny Andrew	6	0	0	0	0	0	0	0	0	0	0	0	6	0	0
3	4	(England)	CB	Callum Connolly	2	0	0	1	0	0	0	0	0	1	0	0	4	0	0
3	6	(Republic of Ireland)	DM	Glenn Whelan	3	0	0	0	0	0	1	0	0	0	0	0	4	0	0
3	7	(Wales)	RW	Wes Burns	4	0	0	0	0	0	0	0	0	0	0	0	4	0	0
3	8	(England)	RM	Mark Duffy	4	0	0	0	0	0	0	0	0	0	0	0	4	0	0
3	10	(Northern Ireland)	CM	Callum Camps	4	0	0	0	0	0	0	0	0	0	0	0	4	0	0
3	36	(England)	CM	Jay Matete	1	0	0	0	0	0	0	0	0	3	0	0	4	0	0
9	9	(Wales)	CF	Ched Evans	3	0	0	0	0	0	0	0	0	0	0	0	3	0	0
9	11	(England)	LM	Josh Morris	2	0	0	0	0	0	0	0	0	1	0	0	3	0	0
9	16	(England)	CM	James Rossiter	3	0	0	0	0	0	0	0	0	0	0	0	3	0	0
9	23	(England)	CM	Sam Finley	3	0	0	0	0	0	0	0	0	0	0	0	3	0	0
13	13	(Canada)	GK	Jayson Leutwiler	2	0	0	0	0	0	0	0	0	0	0	0	2	0	0
13	15	(Scotland)	CM	Paul Coutts	2	0	0	0	0	0	0	0	0	0	0	0	2	0	0
13	20	(England)	CF	Harvey Saunders	1	0	0	0	0	0	1	0	0	0	0	0	2	0	0
13	31	(England)	CM	Laurence Smith	0	0	0	0	0	0	0	0	0	2	0	0	2	0	0
13	32	(England)	CB	Harrison Holgate	1	0	0	1	0	0	0	0	0	0	0	0	2	0	0
13	33	(England)	CB	James Hill	1	0	0	0	0	0	0	0	0	1	0	0	2	0	0
19	2	(England)	RB	Tom Edwards	1	0	0	0	0	0	0	0	0	0	0	0	1	0	0
19	14	(Scotland)	CB	Charlie Mulgrew	0	0	1	0	0	0	0	0	0	0	0	0	0	0	1
19	24	(England)	CM	Daniel Betty	1	0	0	0	0	0	0	0	0	0	0	0	1	0	0
19	35	(England)	CM	Ryan Rydel	0	0	0	0	0	0	0	0	0	1	0	0	1	0	0
Total					50	0	1	3	0	0	3	0	0	10	0	0	66	0	1
