= Billy Crellin =

English footballer (born 2000)

Personal information
- Full name: William Francis Crellin
- Date of birth: 30 June 2000 (age 26)
- Place of birth: Blackpool, England
- Height: 6 ft 1 in (1.85 m)
- Position: Goalkeeper

Team information
- Current team: Glentoran

Youth career
- –2018: Fleetwood Town

Senior career*
Years	Team	Apps	(Gls)
2018–2022	Fleetwood Town	5	(0)
2018	→ FC United of Manchester (loan)	7	(0)
2019	→ Chorley (loan)	9	(0)
2020–2021	→ Bolton Wanderers (loan)	11	(0)
2022–2025	Everton	0	(0)
2024–2025	→ Accrington Stanley (loan)	34	(0)
2025–	Glentoran	1	(0)

International career
2017	England U17	1	(0)
2017–2018	England U18	5	(0)
2018	England U19	1	(0)
2019	England U20	2	(0)
Medal record
Men's football
Representing England
FIFA U-17 World Cup
Winner	2017 India
- * Club domestic league appearances and goals as of 17:31, 31 December 2025 (UTC)

William Francis Crellin (born 30 June 2000) is an English professional footballer who plays as a goalkeeper for Glentoran.

Crellin began his club career at Fleetwood Town, spending time on loan at non-League clubs FC United of Manchester and Chorley, as well as a spell at Bolton Wanderers, where he was promoted out of League Two at the end of the 2020–21 season. He was sold to Everton in January 2022, though he did not play a first-team game for the club, and spent time on loan at Accrington Stanley.

Crellin was capped by England up to under-20 level and won the FIFA U-17 World Cup in 2017.

== Club career ==
=== Fleetwood Town ===
Born in Blackpool, Crellin turned professional at Fleetwood Town in the 2016–17 campaign after being invited to train with the first-team squad in Austria by manager Uwe Rösler. He was named on the Fleetwood bench on the last day of the 2017–18 season in what was John Sheridan's last game as head coach. Crellin had previously been linked with a move to Wolverhampton Wanderers, though said he was prepared to fight Alex Cairns and Matthew Urwin for a starting place. He had already made history at Highbury by becoming the first Fleetwood Town player to receive a call-up to an England age group, as well as being the first player from the club's new category three academy to sign a professional contract.

On 1 August 2018, he joined National League North club FC United of Manchester on loan. United struggled for form, leading to the departure of player-manager Tom Greaves, though Crellin performed well regardless at Broadhurst Park. He played seven matches, conceding 15 goals and keeping two clean sheets. Crellin was recalled early on 20 September as Fleetwood manager Joey Barton felt that losing games of football would be bad for his development. In July 2019, he was the subject of a failed transfer bid from Premier League club Everton. On 16 August 2019, he moved on loan to National League club Chorley until 3 November. He kept two clean sheets in nine games at Victory Park before being recalled on 27 September.

On 3 August 2020, he signed on loan for Bolton Wanderers. His debut at the University of Bolton Stadium came on 5 September in Bolton's first match of the season, a 2–1 defeat to Bradford City in the first round of the EFL Cup. On 28 September, Crellin was defended by Bolton head coach Ian Evatt after being criticised for perceived errors in games. A month later however, Evatt criticised Crellin, stating that he needed to "man up" and that Bolton could not afford for their goalkeeper to keep making so many mistakes, after Crellin was at fault for two of Barrow's goals in a 3–3 draw and four days later scored an own goal in a 1–1 draw with Cambridge United. In the next match, Crellin saved a penalty to help Bolton beat Bradford City 1–0, and was voted man of the match by the Bolton fans. Evatt praised Crellin for responding to the criticism by putting on the man of the match display. Crellin continued to make mistakes, however, and on 13 November he was dropped to the bench for Bolton's derby match against Salford City. He then spent the rest of the 2020–21 season as a back-up goalkeeper, first to Matt Gilks, and then to both Gilks and January signing Lukas Jensen. Bolton were promoted out of League Two in third place.

=== Everton ===
On 31 January 2022, Crellin joined Everton for an undisclosed fee on a two-and-a-half-year deal, linking up with their under-23 squad. He had come from an Everton-supporting family and said it was "surreal" to join his boyhood club. In September 2023, shortly after Asmir Begović left Goodison Park, Crellin signed a new two-year contract. However, he was limited to under-21 and under-23 appearances, featuring on the first-team bench only for the last Premier League game of the 2023–24 season.

On 30 August 2024, he joined League Two club Accrington Stanley on loan for the 2024–25 campaign. Manager John Doolan wanted to provide competition for number one Michael Kelly, in addition to Liam Isherwood and James Rogerson. He played a total of 38 games for Accrington. On 9 June 2025, Everton announced that Crellin would be departing the club at the end of the month upon the expiration of his contract. He spent July 2025 on trial at Port Vale.

=== Glentoran ===
He signed for NIFL Premiership club Glentoran in October 2025. He made his debut on 4 November 2025 during the 2–1 victory against Crusaders in the Irish Cup. He made his NIFL Premiership debut for Glentoran on 19 December 2025 as a substitute for the injured Andrew Mills during the 2–1 victory against Coleraine.

== International career ==
Crellin has represented England at under-17 to under-20 youth levels. In October 2017, Crellin was included in the squad for the 2017 FIFA U-17 World Cup. Manager Steve Cooper selected him to serve as Curtis Anderson's back-up. His only appearance in the tournament was a group stage match against Iraq. On 14 October 2019, Crellin made his England U20 debut against the Czech Republic at Peterborough United.

== Style of play ==
Crellin is an agile goalkeeper who is comfortable with the ball at his feet.

== Career statistics ==
As of match played 19 December 2025

Appearances and goals by club, season and competition
Club	Season	League			National cup		League cup		Other		Total	
Club	Season	Division	Apps	Goals	Apps	Goals	Apps	Goals	Apps	Goals	Apps	Goals
Fleetwood Town	2018–19	League One	0	0	0	0	0	0	1 (Note: Appearance(s) in the EFL Trophy.)	0	1	0
Fleetwood Town	2019–20	League One	5	0	2	0	0	0	1	0	8	0
Fleetwood Town	2020–21	League One	0	0	0	0	0	0	0	0	0	0
Fleetwood Town	2021–22	League One	0	0	0	0	0	0	4	0	4	0
Fleetwood Town	Total		5	0	2	0	0	0	6	0	13	0
F.C. United of Manchester (loan)	2018–19	National League North	7	0	—		—		—		7	0
Chorley (loan)	2019–20	National League	9	0	—		—		—		9	0
Bolton Wanderers (loan)	2020–21	League Two	11	0	1	0	1	0	3	0	16	0
Everton U21	2022–23	—			—		—		1	0	1	0
Everton U21	2023–24	—			—		—		2	0	2	0
Everton U21	Total		0	0	0	0	0	0	3	0	3	0
Everton	2021–22	Premier League	0	0	0	0	0	0	—		0	0
Everton	2022–23	Premier League	0	0	0	0	0	0	—		0	0
Everton	2023–24	Premier League	0	0	0	0	0	0	—		0	0
Everton	2024–25	Premier League	0	0	0	0	0	0	—		0	0
Everton	Total		0	0	0	0	0	0	0	0	0	0
Accrington Stanley (loan)	2024–25	League Two	34	0	3	0	—		1	0	38	0
Glentoran	2025–26	NIFL Premiership	1	0	0	0	—		0	0	1	0
Career total			67	0	6	0	1	0	13	0	87	0

== Honours ==
England U17

- FIFA U-17 World Cup: 2017

Bolton Wanderers

- EFL League Two third-place promotion: 2020–21
