= Harvey Saunders =

English footballer (born 1997)

Personal information
- Full name: Harvey Read Saunders
- Date of birth: 20 July 1997 (age 29)
- Place of birth: Wolverhampton, England
- Height: 5 ft 11 in (1.80 m)
- Position: Striker

Team information
- Current team: Northampton Town
- Number: 32

Youth career
- Barnard Castle
- Darlington Railway Athletic

Senior career*
Years	Team	Apps	(Gls)
- Darlington Railway Athletic
- Bishop Auckland
- Durham City
2017–2019	Darlington	66	(11)
- → Ryhope Colliery Welfare (loan)
- → Dunston UTS (loan)
2019–2021	Fleetwood Town	27	(3)
2019	→ Darlington (loan)	16	(1)
2021	→ Hartlepool United (loan)	2	(0)
2021–2023	Bristol Rovers	33	(2)
2023–2026	Tranmere Rovers	94	(7)
2025–2026	→ Eastleigh (loan)	38	(9)
2026–	Northampton Town	8	(0)
- * Club domestic league appearances and goals as of 21:55, 14 November 2026 (UTC)

Harvey Read Saunders (born 20 July 1997) is an English professional footballer who plays as a striker for EFL League Two club Northampton Town.

== Early and personal life ==
Saunders is from Staindrop. He is nicknamed "Rooster".

== Career ==
=== Early career ===
Saunders joined local club Barnard Castle at the age of 6 or 7, leaving at under-14s after the club folded. He occasionally played rugby for a local club and then began working full-time in an Indian restaurant. The restaurant entered a team into a football competition, which they won. Saunders then began playing Sunday League football, before signing for Darlington Railway Athletic, initially at under-18 level but then for the senior team. He then played for Bishop Auckland and Durham City. He then signed for Darlington, making his debut in January 2017. Whilst at Darlington he had loan spells at Ryhope Colliery Welfare and Dunston UTS. In total he scored 11 goals in 66 league games for Darlington.

=== Fleetwood Town ===
He signed for Fleetwood Town in January 2019 for an undisclosed fee, on a 2 1/2-year contract, and was immediately loaned back to Darlington.

He made his first-team debut for Fleetwood on 3 September 2019 in the EFL Trophy. He scored his first goals for Fleetwood when he scored twice in an EFL Trophy tie against Carlisle United on 1 September 2020, and his first league goal followed in a 2–1 defeat to Rochdale on 3 October 2020. On 6 October 2020, Saunders scored a hat-trick in the EFL Trophy against Aston Villa U21s.

He signed on loan for Hartlepool United on 22 April 2021.

At the end of the 2020–21 season, Saunders was released by Fleetwood Town.

=== Bristol Rovers ===
On 25 June 2021, Saunders agreed to join Bristol Rovers on a two-year deal from the expiration of his Fleetwood contract. Saunders joined former Fleetwood teammates Paul Coutts and Sam Finley in joining former manager Joey Barton that summer. On 7 August 2021, Saunders made his debut for the club in a 2–1 opening day defeat to Mansfield Town, playing the full match as he was the club's only fit striker. On 17 August 2021, Saunders scored his first goal for the club with the only goal in a victory over Oldham Athletic, the club's first win of the season, heading home a cross from Harry Anderson via a deflection. After suffering an injury during an aerial collision in a match against Bradford City on 16 October, Saunders was ruled out until the new year with torn ankle ligaments. On 29 January 2022, Saunders made his return to action from the bench as he assisted Rovers' late winner to defeat Walsall.

=== Tranmere Rovers ===
On 27 January 2023, Saunders signed for League Two club Tranmere Rovers for an undisclosed fee on an eighteen-month contract. The club had previously tried to sign him in the summer.

In August 2025 he moved on loan to Eastleigh. On 12 May 2026, Tranmere announced he would be leaving in the summer once his contract expired.

=== Northampton Town ===
In June 2026 it was announced that he would sign for Northampton Town on 1 July 2026.

== Career statistics ==
As of match played 14 November 2026

Appearances and goals by club, season and competition
Club	Season	League			FA Cup		League Cup		Other		Total	
Club	Season	Division	Apps	Goals	Apps	Goals	Apps	Goals	Apps	Goals	Apps	Goals
Fleetwood Town	2019–20	League One	6	0	1	0	0	0	5 (Note: 3 appearances in EFL Trophy and 2 appearances in EFL League One play-offs)	0	12	0
Fleetwood Town	2020–21	League One	21	3	1	0	3	0	4 (Note: Appearance(s) in EFL Trophy)	5	29	8
Fleetwood Town	Total		27	3	2	0	3	0	9	5	41	8
Darlington (loan)	2019–20	National League North	16	1	0	0	—		0	0	16	1
Hartlepool United (loan)	2020–21	National League	2	0	0	0	—		0	0	2	0
Bristol Rovers	2021–22	League Two	21	2	0	0	1	0	1	1	23	3
Bristol Rovers	2022–23	League One	12	0	2	0	1	0	5	2	20	2
Bristol Rovers	Total		33	2	2	0	2	0	6	3	43	5
Tranmere Rovers	2022–23	League Two	19	3	0	0	0	0	0	0	19	3
Tranmere Rovers	2023–24	League Two	38	3	0	0	1	0	2	0	41	3
Tranmere Rovers	2024–25	League Two	37	1	1	0	3	1	3	0	44	2
Tranmere Rovers	2025–26	League Two	0	0	0	0	1	0	0	0	1	0
Tranmere Rovers	Total		94	7	1	0	5	1	5	0	105	8
Eastleigh (loan)	2025–26	National League	38	9	2	1	—		1	2	41	12
Northampton Town	2026–27	League Two	8	0	0	0	1	0	2	0	11	0
Career Total			218	22	7	1	11	1	23	10	259	34

== Honours ==
Bristol Rovers

- League Two promotion: 2021–22
