= Sam Barratt (footballer, born 2002) =

English footballer

Personal information
- Full name: Samuel Anthony William Barratt
- Date of birth: 30 September 2002 (age 24)
- Place of birth: Stoke-on-Trent, England
- Position: Defender

Team information
- Current team: Runcorn Linnets

Youth career
- –2019: Stoke City
- 2019–2021: Fleetwood Town

Senior career*
Years	Team	Apps	(Gls)
2020–2021	Fleetwood Town	0	(0)
2021	Leek Town	0	(0)
2021–	Glossop North End	29	(2)
- * Club domestic league appearances and goals as of 23:37, 21 June 2022 (UTC)

Sam Anthony William Barratt (born 2002) is an English professional footballer who plays for Glossop North End as a defender.

== Career ==
Barratt started his career in the academy of his local club at Stoke City. In the summer of 2019, he decided to leave Stoke to sign a scholarship with EFL League One side Fleetwood Town, believing that he would get more minutes and be able to progress into the under-23 side. He made his first team debut as a second-year scholar on 10 November 2020, when he replaced Sam Finley as an 89th minute substitute as they beat Sunderland 2–1 in the EFL Trophy Group Stage. He was captain of the under-18 side that won the league title during the 2020–21 season. Despite this, on 30 April 2021, it was announced that he would be released by Fleetwood at the end of his apprenticeship and he departed the club.

Following on from his release he had a short spell at Northern Premier League Division One west side Leek Town in August 2021, before moving to divisional rivals Glossop North End at the end of the month. He made his debut for Glossop in an away trip to City of Liverpool in August 2021 which ended in a 1–1 draw. He then suffered a shoulder injury against Clitheroe, but still went onto have an impact on the season, making 32 appearances and scoring twice. On 13 June 2022, he committed to another season with Glossop North End for the 2022–23 campaign.

== Career statistics ==
As of match played 23 April 2022

Appearances and goals by club, season and competition
Club	Season	League			FA Cup		League Cup		Other		Total	
Club	Season	Division	Apps	Goals	Apps	Goals	Apps	Goals	Apps	Goals	Apps	Goals
Fleetwood Town	2020–21	League One	0	0	0	0	0	0	1 (Note: Appearance in EFL Trophy)	0	1	0
Leek Town	2021–22	NPL Division One West	0	0	0	0	—		—		0	0
Glossop North End	2021–22	NPL Division One West	29	2	—		—		2 (Note: One appearance in FA Trophy, one appearance in Manchester Premier Cup)	0	31	2
Career total			29	2	0	0	0	0	3	0	32	2
