= Harrison Holgate =

English footballer

Personal information
- Full name: Harrison James Holgate
- Date of birth: 1 July 2000 (age 26)
- Place of birth: Leeds, England
- Height: 6 ft 1 in (1.86 m)
- Position: Defender

Team information
- Current team: Gateshead

Youth career
- –2018: Fleetwood Town

Senior career*
Years	Team	Apps	(Gls)
2018–2026	Fleetwood Town	80	(1)
2018	→ Stalybridge Celtic (loan)	14	(1)
2018	→ Stafford Rangers (loan)	9	(0)
2018	→ Ashton United (loan)	3	(0)
2020–2021	→ Altrincham (loan)	2	(0)
2026–	Gateshead	0	(0)
- * Club domestic league appearances and goals as of 14:02, 5 September 2026 (UTC)

Harrison James Holgate (born 1 July 2000) is an English professional footballer who plays as a defender for National League club Gateshead.

== Career ==
=== Fleetwood Town ===
Born in Leeds, Holgate began his career as part of the Manchester United youth academy before being released at U14. He then joined the Middlesbrough youth academy but injury curtailed his U16 involvement which inevitably led to his release. He then joined the Fleetwood Town youth academy on a two-year scholarship where in his second year, still only 17, he signed on 10th Feb 2018 a youth loan to Stalybridge Celtic, making 15 appearances, which led to Holgate signing a professional contract with Fleetwood Town on 4 May 2018. A couple months later, on 6 September, Holgate joined Northern Premier League side Stafford Rangers on a youth loan playing nine games, with Fleetwood Town recalling him on 8 October. On 13 October, he signed with National League North side Ashton United. He made his competitive debut for the club that same day against Spennymoor Town, starting the match in a 5–0 defeat.

After being with Ashton Town for a month, Holgate returned to Fleetwood Town and was an unused substitute for the club's EFL Trophy match against Bury on 13 November. Holgate then made his first-team debut for the club on 25 September 2019 against Liverpool U23 in the EFL Trophy. He started and played the first half before being substituted at half-time as Fleetwood Town would advance through penalties.

The next season, Holgate started in Fleetwood Town's opening EFL Trophy match against Carlisle United. He made his full EFL League 1 debut against Hull City on 9 October, playing the full match in a 4–1 victory.

On 18 December 2020, Holgate joined National League side Altrincham on a youth loan. On 16 January 2021, Holgate was recalled from the loan by Fleetwood Town.

On 15 May 2026, Fleetwood announced he would be leaving in the summer when his contract expired.

=== Gateshead ===
On 4 September 2026, Holgate joined National League club Gateshead on a one-year deal.

== Career statistics ==
As of end of 2025–26 season

Appearances and goals by club, season and competition
Club	Season	League			FA Cup		EFL Cup		Other		Total	
Club	Season	Division	Apps	Goals	Apps	Goals	Apps	Goals	Apps	Goals	Apps	Goals
Fleetwood Town	2017–18	League One	0	0	0	0	0	0	0	0	0	0
Fleetwood Town	2018–19	League One	0	0	0	0	0	0	0	0	0	0
Fleetwood Town	2019–20	League One	0	0	0	0	0	0	1 (Note: Appearance(s) in EFL Trophy)	0	1	0
Fleetwood Town	2020–21	League One	18	0	1	0	1	0	3	0	23	0
Fleetwood Town	2021–22	League One	6	0	0	0	1	0	1	0	8	0
Fleetwood Town	2022–23	League One	19	1	5	0	0	0	1	0	25	1
Fleetwood Town	2023–24	League One	12	0	1	0	1	0	3	0	17	0
Fleetwood Town	2024–25	League Two	5	0	0	0	3	0	1	0	9	0
Fleetwood Town	2025–26	League Two	20	0	2	1	1	0	1	0	24	1
Fleetwood Town	Total		80	1	9	1	7	0	11	0	107	2
Stalybridge Celtic (loan)	2017–18	NPL Premier Division	14	1	—		—		1 (Note: Appearance(s) in Cheshire Senior Cup)	0	15	1
Ashton United (loan)	2018–19	National League North	3	0	—		—		—		3	0
Altrincham (loan)	2020–21	National League	2	0	—		—		1 (Note: Appearance(s) in FA Trophy)	0	3	0
Career total			99	2	9	1	7	0	13	0	128	3
