= Harrison Biggins =

English footballer (born 1996)

- Biggins playing for Newport County in September 2026

Personal information
- Full name: Harrison Biggins
- Date of birth: 15 March 1996 (age 30)
- Place of birth: Sheffield, England
- Height: 5 ft 9 in (1.75 m)
- Position: Midfielder

Team information
- Current team: Newport County
- Number: 10

Youth career
- Barnsley

Senior career*
Years	Team	Apps	(Gls)
- Stocksbridge Park Steels
2017–2022	Fleetwood Town	82	(6)
2020–2021	→ Barrow (loan)	22	(2)
2022–2024	Doncaster Rovers	74	(10)
2024–2026	Shrewsbury Town	23	(0)
2024–2025	→ Carlisle United (loan)	17	(0)
2026	→ Newport County (loan)	21	(3)
2026–	Newport County	16	(4)
- * Club domestic league appearances and goals as of 13:30, 22 November 2026 (UTC)

Harrison Biggins (born 15 March 1996) is an English professional footballer who plays as a midfielder for EFL League Two club Newport County.

== Personal life ==
He is the son of former Stoke City footballer Wayne Biggins. Harrison and his parents all had COVID-19 during the COVID-19 pandemic.

== Career ==
=== Fleetwood Town ===
Born in Sheffield, Biggins played youth football with Barnsley. He moved from Stocksbridge Park Steels to EFL League One club Fleetwood Town in July 2017. He made his senior debut for Fleetwood on 8 November 2017, in an EFL Trophy match against Carlisle United.

On 28 August 2020, Biggins joined League Two side Barrow on a season-long loan. He was recalled by Fleetwood on 1 February 2021. At the end of the 2020–21 season, a contract extension clause was activated. On 5 May 2022 it was announced that Biggins would be released from the club at the end of his contract.

=== Doncaster Rovers ===
On 19 May 2022, it was announced that Biggins would sign for League Two side Doncaster Rovers on 1 July 2022.

=== Shrewsbury Town ===
In June 2024, Biggins signed for EFL League Two club Shrewsbury Town on a two year contract, with effect from 1 July 2024. In August 2024 he moved on loan to Carlisle United. The loan ended in January 2025, after Biggins was recalled by Shrewsbury.

On 3 January 2026 Biggins joined EFL League Two club Newport County on loan for the remainder of the 2025-26 season. He made his debut for Newport on 17 January 2026 in the EFL League Two 3-2 defeat to Gillingham. On 24 January 2026 Biggins scored his first goal for Newport in the EFL League Two 2-1 win against Chesterfield.

Biggins was released by Shrewsbury Town at the end of the 2025–26 season.

=== Newport County ===
Newport County announced on 15 June 2026 that Biggins would be returning to the club on a permanent contract.

== Career statistics ==
As of match played 21 November 2026

Appearances and goals by club, season and competition
Club	Season	League			FA Cup		League Cup		Other		Total	
Club	Season	Division	Apps	Goals	Apps	Goals	Apps	Goals	Apps	Goals	Apps	Goals
Fleetwood Town	2017–18	League One	7	0	0	0	0	0	4 (Note: Appearances in the EFL Trophy)	0	11	0
Fleetwood Town	2018–19	League One	23	1	2	0	2	0	3	0	30	1
Fleetwood Town	2019–20	League One	10	0	0	0	1	0	2	0	13	0
Fleetwood Town	2020–21	League One	10	0	0	0	0	0	0	0	10	0
Fleetwood Town	2021–22	League One	32	5	1	0	1	0	2	0	36	5
Fleetwood Town	Total		82	6	3	0	4	0	11	0	100	6
Barrow (loan)	2020–21	League Two	22	2	0	0	1	0	4	0	27	2
Doncaster Rovers	2022–23	League Two	36	5	1	0	1	0	2	0	40	5
Doncaster Rovers	2023–24	League Two	38	5	2	1	1	0	3 (Note: 2 games and 1 goal in the EFL Trophy, 1 game and 1 goal in the play-offs)	2	44	8
Doncaster Rovers	Total		74	10	3	1	2	0	5	2	84	13
Shrewsbury Town	2024–25	League One	17	0	0	0	2	0	1	0	20	0
Shrewsbury Town	2025–26	League Two	6	0	1	0	0	0	2	0	9	0
Shrewsbury Town	Total		23	0	1	0	2	0	3	0	29	0
Carlisle United (loan)	2024–25	League Two	17	0	0	0	0	0	0	0	17	0
Newport County (loan)	2025–26	League Two	21	3	0	0	0	0	0	0	21	3
Newport County	2026–27	League Two	16	4	1	0	1	0	2	0	20	4
Career total			255	25	8	1	10	0	25	2	298	28
