= 2019–20 Fleetwood Town F.C. season =

Fleetwood Town
2019–20 season
- Chairman: Andy Pilley
- Head Coach: Joey Barton
- Stadium: Highbury Stadium
- League One: 6th
- FA Cup: Third round
- EFL Cup: First round
- EFL Trophy: Third round
- Top goalscorer: League: Paddy Madden (15 goals); All: Paddy Madden (19 goals)
Home colours	Away colours

The 2019–20 season was Fleetwood Town's 112th season in their history and sixth consecutive season in League One. Along with League One, the club also participated in this season's editions of the FA Cup, EFL Cup and EFL Trophy.

The season covers the period from 1 July 2019 to 30 June 2020.

== Transfers ==
=== Transfers in ===
Date	Position	Nationality	Name	From	Fee	Ref.
1 July 2019	LB	(England)	Danny Andrew	(England) Doncaster Rovers	Free transfer	
1 July 2019	GK	(England)	James Cottam	(England) Preston North End	Undisclosed	
1 July 2019	LM	(England)	Josh Morris	(England) Scunthorpe United	Free transfer	
3 July 2019	CM	(Scotland)	Paul Coutts	(England) Sheffield United	Free transfer	
1 August 2019	CB	(England)	Peter Clarke	(England) Oldham Athletic	Free transfer	
1 August 2019	GK	(Scotland)	Matt Gilks	(England) Lincoln City	Free transfer	
6 August 2019	CF	(Wales)	Ched Evans	(England) Sheffield United	Undisclosed	
10 January 2020	RB	(England)	Lewie Coyle	(England) Leeds United	Undisclosed	
24 January 2020	DM	(Republic of Ireland)	Glenn Whelan	(Scotland) Heart of Midlothian	Free transfer	

=== Loans in ===
Date from	Position	Nationality	Name	From	Date until	Ref.
5 July 2019	RB	(England)	Lewie Coyle	(England) Leeds United	January 2020	
8 July 2019	CM	(England)	Jordan Rossiter	(Scotland) Rangers	30 June 2020	
18 July 2019	CB	(Australia)	Harry Souttar	(England) Stoke City	30 June 2020	
2 September 2019	CB	(Republic of Ireland)	Jimmy Dunne	(England) Burnley	1 January 2020	
6 January 2020	DM	(England)	Callum Connolly	(England) Everton	30 June 2020	
31 January 2020	CB	(England)	Lewis Gibson	(England) Everton	30 June 2020	
31 January 2020	LW	(Scotland)	Barrie McKay	(Wales) Swansea City	30 June 2020	
31 January 2020	CM	(Iceland)	Ísak Snaer Thorvaldsson	(England) Norwich City	30 June 2020	

=== Loans out ===
Date from	Position	Nationality	Name	To	Date until	Ref.
22 July 2019	LB	(England)	Eddie Clarke	(England) Macclesfield Town	16 January 2020	
16 August 2019	GK	(England)	Billy Crellin	(England) Chorley	27 September 2019	
13 September 2019	CF	(England)	Michael Fowler	(England) Bamber Bridge	13 November 2019	
2 January 2020	LW	(England)	Ashley Hunter	(England) Salford City	30 June 2020	
16 January 2020	LB	(England)	Eddie Clarke	(England) Stockport County	30 June 2020	
21 January 2020	CB	(England)	Nathan Sheron	(England) Walsall	30 June 2020	
23 January 2020	RB	(Wales)	Macauley Southam-Hales	(England) Hartlepool United	30 June 2020	
30 January 2020	CF	(England)	Conor McAleny	(England) Shrewsbury Town	30 June 2020	
21 February 2020	LB	(England)	Ryan Rydel	(England) Lancaster City	30 June 2020	

=== Transfers out ===
Date	Position	Nationality	Name	To	Fee	Ref.
1 July 2019	GK	(England)	Paul Jones	(England) Sheffield Wednesday	Released	
1 July 2019	LB	(England)	Joe Maguire	(England) Accrington Stanley	Released	
1 July 2019	CF	(England)	Ashley Nadesan	(England) Crawley Town	Free transfer	
1 July 2019	RB	(England)	Ryan Taylor	Free agent	Released	
1 July 2019	CM	(England)	James Wallace	Free agent	Released	
25 July 2019	CB	(England)	Lewis Baines	(England) Chorley	Free transfer	
19 August 2019	RB	(Wales)	Gethin Jones	(England) Carlisle United	Mutual consent	
2 September 2019	CB	(Wales)	Craig Morgan	Free agent	Mutual consent	
2 September 2019	RM	(Scotland)	Ross Wallace	(Scotland) St Mirren	Contract expiry	
1 January 2020	CB	(England)	Peter Clarke	(England) Tranmere Rovers	Free transfer	
31 January 2020	CB	(England)	Ashley Eastham	(England) Salford City	Undisclosed	
4 February 2020	FW	(Wales)	Dan Mooney	(England) Altrincham	Undisclosed	

== Pre-season ==
The Cod Army has announced pre-season friendlies against Wrexham, Port Vale, Carlisle United, Burnley and Preston North End.

5 July 2019 Friendly	Fleetwood Town	1–0	Wrexham	Thornton
18:00 BST	Fowler 81'	Report		Stadium: Poolfort Farm

17 July 2019 Friendly	Port Vale	1–0	Fleetwood Town	Burslem
19:30 BST	Amoo 58'	Report		Stadium: Vale Park

20 July 2019 Friendly	Carlisle United	1–3	Fleetwood Town	Carlisle
15:00 BST	Bridge 10'	Report	Madden 41' (pen.), 69'; Biggins 58'	Stadium: Brunton Park

23 July 2019 Friendly	Fleetwood Town	0–2	Burnley	Fleetwood
19:45 BST		Report	Koiki 44'; Wood 58'	Stadium: Highbury Stadium

26 July 2019 Friendly	Fleetwood Town	1–0	Preston North End	Fleetwood
19:45 BST	Hunter 59'	Report		Stadium: Highbury Stadium

6 August 2019 Friendly	Fleetwood Town	1–1	Blackpool	Thornton-Cleveleys
14:00 BST	Wallace 71'	Report	Nottingham	Stadium: Poolfoot Farm

== Competitions ==
=== League One ===
==== League table ====
Pos	Team	Pld	W	D	L	GF	GA	GD	Pts	PPG	Promotion, qualification or relegation
2	Rotherham United (P)	35	18	8	9	61	38	+23	62	1.77	Promotion to the EFL Championship
3	Wycombe Wanderers (O, P)	34	17	8	9	45	40	+5	59	1.74	Qualification for League One play-offs (Note: Four teams play for one spot and promotion to the EFL Championship.)
4	Oxford United	35	17	9	9	61	37	+24	60	1.71	Qualification for League One play-offs
5	Portsmouth	35	17	9	9	53	36	+17	60	1.71	Qualification for League One play-offs
6	Fleetwood Town	35	16	12	7	51	38	+13	60	1.71	Qualification for League One play-offs
7	Peterborough United	35	17	8	10	68	40	+28	59	1.69	
8	Sunderland	36	16	11	9	48	32	+16	59	1.64	
9	Doncaster Rovers	34	15	9	10	51	33	+18	54	1.59	
10	Gillingham	35	12	15	8	42	34	+8	51	1.46	

Source: EFL Official Website
Rules for classification: 1) Points per game; 2) Goal difference; 3) Number of goals scored; 4) Head-to-head results; 5) Wins; 6) Away goals; 7) Penalty points (sec 9.5); 8) 12-point sending-off offences
(O) Play-off winners; (P) Promoted

==== Results summary ====
Overall								Home						Away					
Pld	W	D	L	GF	GA	GD	Pts	W	D	L	GF	GA	GD	W	D	L	GF	GA	GD
35	16	12	7	51	38	+13	60	10	7	1	25	13	+12	6	5	6	26	25	+1

Last updated: 10 March 2020.
Source: BBC

==== Results by matchday ====
Matchday	1	2	3	4	5	6	7	8	9	10	11	12	13	14	15	16	17	18	19	20	21	22	23	24	25	26	27	28	29	30	31	32	33	34	35
Ground	A	H	A	H	H	A	H	A	H	A	H	H	A	H	A	H	A	H	A	A	H	H	A	H	A	H	H	A	A	H	H	A	A	H	A
Result	W	W	L	D	W	L	W	D	W	W	L	W	L	W	L	W	L	D	D	W	D	D	L	D	D	D	W	W	W	W	W	D	W	D	D
Position	1	3	5	7	6	9	4	4	4	3	3	4	5	4	5	7	9	9	9	7	8	7	10	11	11	11	9	9	9	8	6	7	6	7	5

Updated to match(es) played on 10 March 2020. Source: Statto.com
A = Away; H = Home; W = Win; D = Draw; L = Loss

==== Matches ====
On Thursday, 20 June 2019, the EFL League One fixtures were revealed.

3 August 2019 1	Peterborough United	1–3	Fleetwood Town	Peterborough
15:00 BST	Toney 67' (yellow card) 90+3'	Report	Souttar 4'; Morris 13'; Coutts (yellow card) 51'; Biggins (yellow card) 66'; Coyle (yellow card) 78'; Andrew 81'; Hunter (yellow card) 84'; Madden (yellow card) 89'; Cairns (yellow card) 90+1'	Stadium: Weston Homes Stadium; Attendance: 7,958; Referee: Robert Lewis

10 August 2019 2	Fleetwood Town	2–1	AFC Wimbledon	Fleetwood
15:00 BST	Rossiter (yellow card) 39'; Madden 56'; Morris 65'	Report	Appiah (yellow card) 19', (goal) 26'; Pinnock (yellow card) 39'; Thomas (yellow card) 62'	Stadium: Highbury Stadium; Attendance: 2,684; Referee: Tom Nield

17 August 2019 3	Doncaster Rovers	3–2	Fleetwood Town	Doncaster
15:00 BST	Sheaf (yellow card) 16'; John 19'; Whiteman (yellow card) 24'; Coppinger 39'; May (yellow card) 62'; Burns 90+1' (o.g.)	Report	McAleny 10'; Madden 56'; Clarke (yellow card) 88'; Coyle (yellow card) 90+1'	Stadium: Keepmoat Stadium; Attendance: 6,740; Referee: James Adcock

20 August 2019 4	Fleetwood Town	1–1	Wycombe Wanderers	Fleetwood
19:45 BST	Clarke (yellow card) 40'; Madden 90'	Report	Phillips (yellow card) 38'; Akinfenwa 57'	Stadium: Highbury Stadium; Attendance: 2,319; Referee: Oliver Yates

24 August 2019 5	Fleetwood Town	2–0	Accrington Stanley	Fleetwood
15:00 BST	Madden 28'; Evans 71' (pen.) (yellow card) 75'; Burns (yellow card) 75'; Andrew (yellow card) 90+4'	Report	McConville (red card) 74'	Stadium: Highbury Stadium; Attendance: 2,802; Referee: Peter Wright

31 August 2019 6	Lincoln City	2–0	Fleetwood Town	Lincoln
15:00 BST	Walker 34', 35'	Report	Andrew (yellow card) 54'	Stadium: Sincil Bank; Attendance: 8,361; Referee: Stephen Wright

7 September 2019 7	Fleetwood Town	2–1	Oxford United	Fleetwood
15:00 BST	Madden 15'; Clarke 79'; Coutts (yellow card) 89'	Report	Moore 33'; Mackie (yellow card) 40'; Baptiste (yellow card) 49'	Stadium: Highbury Stadium; Attendance: 2,672; Referee: Trevor Kettle

14 September 2019 8	Southend United	3–3	Fleetwood Town	Southend-on-Sea
15:00 BST	McLaughlin 17'; Kiernan (yellow card) 32'; Humphrys 48', 87'	Report	Clarke (yellow card) 17'; Dunne 34'; Morris 45+1'; Dempsey 52'; Coutts (yellow card) 78'; Burns (yellow card) 78'	Stadium: Roots Hall; Attendance: 5,236; Referee: John Busby

21 September 2019 9	Fleetwood Town	2–1	Rochdale	Fleetwood
15:00 BST	Andrew 22'; Evans 87'	Report	Pyke 8'; Camps (yellow card) 63'; McNulty (yellow card) 71'; Morley (yellow card) 79'; Dooley (yellow card) 90+3'	Stadium: Highbury Stadium; Attendance: 3,229; Referee: Graham Salisbury

28 September 2019 10	Shrewsbury Town	0–3	Fleetwood Town	Shrewsbury
15:00 BST	Norburn (yellow card) 40'; Love (yellow card) 63'	Report	Lang 36' (o.g.); Morris 56'; Madden 81' (yellow card) 90+6'; Cairns (yellow card) 90+3'	Stadium: Montgomery Waters Meadow; Attendance: 5,888; Referee: Kevin Johnson

5 October 2019 11	Fleetwood Town	0–1	Ipswich Town	Fleetwood
15:00 BST	Coutts (yellow card) 21'; Evans (yellow card) 72'; Andrew (yellow card) 74'; Dunne (yellow card) 88'	Report	Norwood (yellow card) 20'; Skuse (yellow card) 43'; Wilson (yellow card) 50' (yellow-red card) 90+3'; Jackson 58' (penalty missed) 88'; Edwards (yellow card) 74'; Nolan (yellow card) 90+5'	Stadium: Highbury Stadium; Attendance: 4,312; Referee: Carl Boyeson

12 October 2019	Sunderland	v	Fleetwood Town	Sunderland
15:00 BST		Report		Stadium: Stadium of Light
Note: On 2 October 2019, the match was postponed due to international call-ups.

19 October 2019 12	Fleetwood Town	4–1	Burton Albion	Fleetwood
15:00 BST	Evans 38'; Madden 58', 68', 90'; Coutts (yellow card) 86'	Report	Wallace (yellow card) 5'; Sarkic 45'; Boyce (yellow card) 90+1'	Stadium: Highbury Stadium; Attendance: 3,098; Referee: Christopher Sarginson

23 October 2019 13	Coventry City	2–1	Fleetwood Town	Bordesley
19:45 BST	Bakayoko 59'; Westbrooke 68' (pen.)	Report	Madden 9'; Andrew (yellow card) 25'; Hunter (yellow card) 82'	Stadium: St Andrew's Trillion Trophy Stadium; Attendance: 4,672

26 October 2019 14	Fleetwood Town	1–0	Milton Keynes Dons	Fleetwood
15:00 BST	Evans 85'	Report	Moore-Taylor (yellow card) 4'; Lewington (yellow card) 33'; Houghton (yellow card) 39'	Stadium: Highbury Stadium; Attendance: 2,722; Referee: Marc Edwards

2 November 2019 15	Bolton Wanderers	2–1	Fleetwood Town	Horwich
15:00 GMT	Wright (yellow card) 4'; L. Murphy (yellow card) 11'; O'Grady 28'; D. Murphy 33'	Report	Dempsey (yellow card) 26'; Coyle (yellow card) 30'; Madden (yellow card) 49'; Morris 85'	Stadium: University of Bolton Stadium; Attendance: 12,756; Referee: Scott Oldham

16 November 2019	Portsmouth	v	Fleetwood Town	Milton
15:00 GMT		Report		Stadium: Fratton Park
Note: On 7 November, the match was postponed due to international call-ups.

23 November 2019 16	Fleetwood Town	2–1	Tranmere Rovers	Fleetwood
15:00 GMT	Morris 15'; Madden 82'	Report	Mullin 87'	Stadium: Highbury Stadium; Attendance: 3,811; Referee: Josh Smith

7 December 2019 17	Blackpool	3–1	Fleetwood Town	Blackpool
15:00 GMT	Feeney 11'; Heneghan (yellow card) 15'; Kaikai 47'; Edwards (yellow card) 59'; Gnanduillet 65', (yellow card) 83'; Husband (yellow card) 90+9'	Report	Dempsey (yellow card) 13'; Sowerby (yellow card) 40'; McAleny 80'	Stadium: Bloomfield Road; Referee: Antony Coggins

14 December 2019 18	Fleetwood Town	1–1	Gillingham	Fleetwood
15:00 GMT	Madden (yellow card) 36' (goal) 56'	Report	Fuller (yellow card) 10'; Hanlan (yellow card) 47'; Jones (yellow card) 63'; Ehmer (yellow card) 75'; Jakubiak 82'; Pringle (yellow card) 90+1'	Stadium: Highbury Stadium; Attendance: 2,468; Referee: Graham Salisbury

21 December 2019 19	Rotherham United	2–2	Fleetwood Town	Rotherham
15:00 GMT	Mattock (yellow card) 17'; Clarke (yellow card) 23'; Ladapo 62'; Thompson (yellow card) 78'; Crooks 80'	Report	Evans 26', 63'; Coyle (yellow card) 57'	Stadium: AESSEAL New York Stadium; Attendance: 7,883; Referee: Peter Wright

26 December 2019 20	Rochdale	2–3	Fleetwood Town	Spotland
15:00 GMT	Wilbraham 41', 60' (yellow card) 41'; Baah (yellow card) 88'; O'Connell (yellow card) 90+1'	Report	Madden 53'; Dempsey 65'; Burns 89' (yellow card) 90+9'	Stadium: Crown Oil Arena; Attendance: 3,167; Referee: Andy Haines

29 December 2019 21	Fleetwood Town	0–0	Bristol Rovers	Fleetwood
15:00 GMT	Madden (yellow card) 42'; Andrew (yellow card) 45+1'; Coutts (yellow card) 85'	Report	Leahy (yellow card) 15'; Ogogo (yellow card) 29'; Clarke-Harris (yellow card) 89'	Stadium: Highbury Stadium; Attendance: 2,848; Referee: Paul Marsden

1 January 2020 22	Fleetwood Town	1–1	Sunderland	Fleetwood
15:00 GMT	Evans 13' (pen.); Sowerby (yellow card) 71'; Cairns (yellow card) 82'	Report	Willis (yellow card) 65'; Dobson (yellow card) 76'; Maguire 86' (pen.)	Stadium: Highbury Stadium; Attendance: 4,011; Referee: Anthony Backhouse

4 January 2020	Ipswich Town	v	Fleetwood Town	Ipswich
15:00 GMT		Report		Stadium: Portman Road
Note: The match was postponed on 1 December, due to Fleetwood Town's progression in the FA Cup.

11 January 2020 23	Burton Albion	1–0	Fleetwood Town	Burton upon Trent
15:00 GMT	Edwards 89'	Report	Connolly (yellow card) 17'; Souttar (yellow card) 59'; Evans (yellow card) 61'	Stadium: Pirelli Stadium; Attendance: 2,354; Referee: Josh Smith

18 January 2020 24	Fleetwood Town	2–2	Shrewsbury Town	Fleetwood
15:00 GMT	Coyle 49'; Morris 87'	Report	Whalley 39'; Norburn (yellow card) 55'; Cummings 81'	Stadium: Highbury Stadium; Attendance: 2,797; Referee: Christopher Sarginson

25 January 2020 25	Bristol Rovers	0–0	Fleetwood Town	Horfield
15:00 GMT	Davies (yellow card) 69'; Clarke-Harris (yellow card) 82' (penalty missed) 87'	Report	Madden (yellow card) 86'	Stadium: Memorial Stadium; Attendance: 6,469; Referee: Christopher Pollard

28 January 2020 26	Fleetwood Town	0–0	Coventry City	Fleetwood
19:45 GMT	Coyle (yellow card) 18'; Whelan (yellow card) 66'; Souttar (yellow card) 88'; Evans (yellow card) 90'; Sowerby (yellow card) 90+1'	Report	McCallum (yellow card) 78'; McFadzean (yellow card) 87'; Walsh (yellow card) 90+2'	Stadium: Highbury Stadium; Attendance: 2,506; Referee: Oliver Yates

1 February 2020 27	Fleetwood Town	2–1	Doncaster Rovers	Fleetwood
15:00 GMT	Evans 35'; Coyle (yellow card) 40'; Souttar 49'; Whelan (yellow card) 56'; Cairns (yellow card) 83'	Report	Halliday (yellow card) 22'; Ennis 55'; Gomes (yellow card) 90+6'	Stadium: Highbury Stadium; Attendance: 3,008; Referee: Ross Joyce

8 February 2020 28	AFC Wimbledon	1–2	Fleetwood Town	Norbiton
15:00 GMT	McLoughlin 34'; Lamy (yellow card) 90'	Report	Connolly (yellow card) 9'; O'Neill 22' (o.g.); Madden 81'; Evans (yellow card) 86'	Stadium: The Cherry Red Records Stadium; Attendance: 4,097; Referee: David Rock

11 February 2020 29	Wycombe Wanderers	0–1	Fleetwood Town	High Wycombe
19:45 GMT	McCarthy (yellow card) 79'; Jacobson (yellow card) 90'; Smyth (yellow card) 90+1'	Report	Connolly (yellow card) 14'; Evans (red card) 68'; Madden 75'; Saunders (yellow card) 90+6'	Stadium: Adams Park; Referee: Kevin Johnson

15 February 2020 30	Fleetwood Town	2–1	Peterborough United	Fleetwood
15:00 GMT	McKay (yellow card) 2'; Cairns (yellow card) 7'; Connolly 15'; Burns 76'	Report	Eisa (penalty missed) 8'; Butler 54'; Thompson (yellow card) 73'	Stadium: Highbury Stadium; Attendance: 2,801; Referee: Martin Coy

22 February 2020 31	Fleetwood Town	1–0	Portsmouth	Fleetwood
15:00 GMT	Connolly 12'; Souttar (yellow card) 45+1'; Burns (yellow card) 83'; Coutts (yellow card) 90+3'	Report	Seddon (yellow card) 90+1'	Stadium: Highbury Stadium; Attendance: 3,370; Referee: Matt Donohue

25 February 2020 32	Sunderland	1–1	Fleetwood Town	Sunderland
19:45 GMT	Power (yellow card) 14' (goal) 90+7'; Öztürk (yellow card) 53'	Report	McKay 5'; Madden (yellow card) 78'; Coyle (yellow card) 80'	Stadium: Stadium of Light; Attendance: 28,255

29 February 2020	Tranmere Rovers	v	Fleetwood Town	Birkenhead
15:00 GMT		Report		Stadium: Prenton Park
Note: Match postponed due to waterlogged pitch.

3 March 2020 33	Ipswich Town	0–1	Fleetwood Town	Ipswich
19:45 BST	Chambers (yellow card) 66'	Report	Evans 40'; Madden (yellow card) 70'	Stadium: Portman Road; Attendance: 15,678; Referee: Neil Hair

7 March 2020 34	Fleetwood Town	0–0	Blackpool	Fleetwood
15:00 GMT		Report	Husband (yellow card) 64'; Virtue (yellow card) 80'	Stadium: Highbury Stadium; Attendance: 4,884; Referee: John Busby

10 March 2020 35	Portsmouth	2–2	Fleetwood Town	Milton
19:45 GMT	Raggett 36'; Souttar 48' (o.g.); Curtis (yellow card) 68'; Harrison (yellow card) 90+1'	Report	Whelan (yellow card) 10'; McKay 19' (yellow card) 77'; Gibson (yellow card) 43'; Souttar 55'; Connolly (yellow card) 68'	Stadium: Fratton Park; Attendance: 16,775; Referee: Darren Drysdale

14 March 2020	Gillingham	v	Fleetwood Town	Gillingham
15:00 GMT				Stadium: Priestfield Stadium
Note: Season was suspended until 3 April 2020, due to the COVID-19 pandemic.

21 March 2020	Fleetwood Town	v	Rotherham United	Fleetwood
15:00 GMT				Stadium: Highbury Stadium
Note: Season was suspended until 3 April 2020, due to the COVID-19 pandemic.

28 March 2020	Fleetwood Town	v	Bolton Wanderers	Fleetwood
15:00 GMT				Stadium: Highbury Stadium
Note: Season was suspended until 3 April 2020, due to the COVID-19 pandemic.

4 April 2020	Milton Keynes Dons	v	Fleetwood Town	Denbigh
15:00 GMT				Stadium: Stadium mk
Note: On 3 April, the English Football League decided to postpone all football until safe to do so due to the COVID-19 pandemic.

10 April 2020	Accrington Stanley	v	Fleetwood Town	Accrington
15:00 BST				Stadium: Wham Stadium
Note: On 3 April, the English Football League decided to postpone all football until safe to do so due to the COVID-19 pandemic.

13 April 2020	Fleetwood Town	v	Lincoln City	Fleetwood
13:00 BST				Stadium: Highbury Stadium
Note: On 3 April, the English Football League decided to postpone all football until safe to do so due to the COVID-19 pandemic.

18 April 2020	Oxford United	v	Fleetwood Town	Oxford
15:00 BST				Stadium: Kassam Stadium
Note: On 3 April, the English Football League decided to postpone all football until safe to resume because of the COVID-19 pandemic outbreak.

25 April 2020	Fleetwood Town	v	Southend United	Fleetwood
15:00 BST				Stadium: Highbury Stadium
Note: On 3 April, the English Football League decided to postpone all football until safe to resume because of the COVID-19 pandemic outbreak.

==== Play-offs ====
3 July 2020 Semi-final first leg	Fleetwood Town	1–4	Wycombe Wanderers	Fleetwood
19:30 BST	Evans 4' (pen.); Coyle (red card) 33'; Connolly (yellow card) 45+2'; Madden (yellow card) 84' (yellow-red card) 84'	Report	Ofoborh 2'; Cairns 6' (o.g.); Jacobson (yellow card) 30'; Wheeler 45+3'; Samuel 57'	Stadium: Highbury Stadium; Attendance: 0 Referee: Tony Harrington

6 July 2020 Semi-final second leg	Wycombe Wanderers	2–2 (6–3 agg.)	Fleetwood Town	High Wycombe
19:30 BST	Thompson (yellow card) 39'; Onyedinma 47', 90+4'	Report	Andrew 22'; Evans 60' (pen.)	Stadium: Adams Park; Attendance: 0 Referee: Darren Bond

=== FA Cup ===
The first round draw was made on 21 October 2019. The second round draw was made live on 11 November from Chichester City's stadium, Oaklands Park. The third round draw was made live on BBC Two from Etihad Stadium, Micah Richards and Tony Adams conducted the draw.

10 November 2019 First round	Barnet	0–2	Fleetwood Town	Canons Park
12:45 BST	Vilhete (yellow card) 62'	Report	Evans 29'; Andrew (yellow card) 66'; Hunter 90'; Burns (yellow card) 90+2'	Stadium: The Hive Stadium; Attendance: 1,100; Referee: John Busby

1 December 2019 Second round	Crawley Town	1–2	Fleetwood Town	Crawley
14:00 GMT	Palmer 44'; Lubala (yellow card) 79'; Dallison (yellow card) 87'; Doherty (yellow card) 90+4'	Report	Morris 41'; Madden 66'	Stadium: The People's Pension Stadium; Referee: Matthew Donohue

4 January 2020 Third round	Fleetwood Town	1–2	Portsmouth	Fleetwood
15:00 GMT	Evans (yellow card) 45+1'; McAleny 90+1'	Report	Raggett (yellow card) 39'; Bolton 66'; Harness 71'; Walkes (yellow card) 90+3'	Stadium: Highbury Stadium; Attendance: 2,145; Referee: Marc Edwards

=== EFL Cup ===
The first round draw was made on 20 June.

13 August 2019 First round	Nottingham Forest	1–0	Fleetwood Town	West Bridgford
19:45 BST	Silva (yellow card) 44' (goal) 59'; Bostock (yellow card) 83'; Ribeiro (yellow card) 90'	Report	Morris (yellow card) 77'; McAleny (yellow card) 80'; Coyle (yellow card) 90'	Stadium: City Ground; Attendance: 7,432; Referee: Alan Young

=== EFL Trophy ===
On 9 July 2019, the pre-determined group stage draw was announced with Invited clubs to be drawn on 12 July 2019. The draw for the second round was made on 16 November 2019 live on Sky Sports. The third round draw was confirmed on 5 December 2019.

Pos	Div	Team	Pld	W	PW	PL	L	GF	GA	GD	Pts	Qualification
1	L1	Accrington Stanley	3	3	0	0	0	10	3	+7	9	Advance to Round 2
2	L1	Fleetwood Town	3	1	1	0	1	7	5	+2	5	Advance to Round 2
3	L2	Oldham Athletic	3	1	0	0	2	5	10	−5	3	
4	ACA	Liverpool U21	3	0	0	1	2	5	9	−4	1	

Source: EFL.com

3 September 2019 Group stages	Accrington Stanley	2–1	Fleetwood Town	Accrington
19:45 BST	Sherif (yellow card) 23'; Carvalho 53'; McConville 72'; Barclay (yellow card) 84'	Report	Biggins (red card) 25'; Rossiter (yellow card) 45+1'; Evans (yellow card) 60'; Hunter (yellow card) 68'; Madden 90+4' (pen.)	Stadium: Crown Ground; Attendance: 923; Referee: Darren Handley

25 September 2019 Group stage	Fleetwood Town	1–1 (4–3 p)	Liverpool U21	Fleetwood
19:45 BST	Hunter (yellow card) 47'; Baggley (yellow card) 53'; Clarke 76' (yellow card) 90+1'	Report	Koumetio (yellow card) 71'; Williams 78'	Stadium: Highbury Stadium; Attendance: 866; Referee: Martin Coy
	Penalties
	Clarke (penalty scored); Garner (penalty scored); Matete (penalty scored); Mooney (penalty missed); Baggley (penalty scored)		Williams (penalty scored); Stewart (penalty scored); Cain (penalty missed); Dixon-Bonner (penalty scored); Clayton (penalty missed)

13 November 2019 Group stage	Fleetwood Town	5–2	Oldham Athletic	Fleetwood
19:45 GMT	Clarke 9'; Morris 11'; Sowerby 14'; Burns 40'; Madden 51'	Report	Smith 25'; Azankpo 78'	Stadium: Highbury Stadium; Attendance: 535; Referee: Andy Haines

26 November 2019 Second round	Everton U21	0–4	Fleetwood Town	Walton
19:45 GMT	Baningime (yellow card) 27'; Onyango (yellow card) 54'	Report	Andrew 2'; Coutts 75'; Sowerby (yellow card) 77'; Madden 79'; Burns 87'	Stadium: Goodison Park; Attendance: 624; Referee: Michael Salisbury

7 January 2020 Third round	Fleetwood Town	2–2 (3–5 p)	Accrington Stanley	Fleetwood
19:45 GMT	Morris 50'; Andrew 68'	Report	Johnson (yellow card) 29'; Pritchard 35'; Opoku (yellow card) 45+2'; Alese (yellow card) 67'; Finley (yellow card) 73'; Sykes 90'	Stadium: Highbury Stadium; Attendance: 548; Referee: Robert Lewis
	Penalties
	Madden (penalty missed); Andrew (penalty scored); McAleny (penalty scored); Biggins (penalty scored)		Bursik (penalty scored); Pritchard (penalty scored); Opoku (penalty scored); Charles (penalty scored); Finley (penalty scored)

=== Statistics ===
As of 13 March 2020

No.	Pos	Nat	Player	Total		League One		FA Cup		League Cup		League Trophy	
No.	Pos	Nat	Player	Apps	Goals	Apps	Goals	Apps	Goals	Apps	Goals	Apps	Goals
1	GK	(England) ENG	Alex Cairns	30	0	25+0	0	1+0	0	1+0	0	3+0	0
2	DF	(England) ENG	Lewie Coyle	41	1	34+0	1	3+0	0	1+0	0	2+1	0
3	DF	(England) ENG	Danny Andrew	43	4	35+0	2	3+0	0	1+0	0	4+0	2
4	DF	(England) ENG	Callum Connolly	13	2	13+0	2	0+0	0	0+0	0	0+0	0
6	DF	(Australia) AUS	Harry Souttar	39	3	33+1	3	3+0	0	1+0	0	1+0	0
7	FW	(Wales) WAL	Wes Burns	41	4	31+3	2	2+1	0	1+0	0	3+0	2
8	MF	(England) ENG	Kyle Dempsey	28	2	19+2	2	3+0	0	0+0	0	2+2	0
9	FW	(Wales) WAL	Ched Evans	33	10	19+9	9	3+0	1	0+0	0	2+0	0
11	MF	(England) ENG	Josh Morris	41	10	23+10	7	3+0	1	0+1	0	2+2	2
12	MF	(Republic of Ireland) IRL	Glenn Whelan	11	0	11+0	0	0+0	0	0+0	0	0+0	0
13	GK	(Scotland) SCO	Matt Gilks	6	0	5+0	0	0+0	0	0+0	0	1+0	0
15	MF	(Scotland) SCO	Paul Coutts	37	1	28+4	0	3+0	0	1+0	0	1+0	1
16	MF	(England) ENG	Jordan Rossiter	19	0	15+0	0	1+0	0	1+0	0	2+0	0
17	FW	(Republic of Ireland) IRL	Paddy Madden	43	19	26+9	15	1+2	1	1+0	0	1+3	3
19	DF	(England) ENG	Lewis Gibson	9	0	9+0	0	0+0	0	0+0	0	0+0	0
21	MF	(Scotland) SCO	Barrie McKay	8	2	7+1	2	0+0	0	0+0	0	0+0	0
24	MF	(Iceland) ISL	Ísak Þorvaldsson	2	0	0+2	0	0+0	0	0+0	0	0+0	0
27	MF	(England) ENG	Harrison Biggins	13	0	5+5	0	0+0	0	1+0	0	2+0	0
28	MF	(England) ENG	Jack Sowerby	30	1	13+10	0	1+2	0	0+0	0	4+0	1
30	MF	(Northern Ireland) NIR	Barry Baggley	1	0	0+0	0	0+0	0	0+0	0	1+0	0
31	GK	(England) ENG	Billy Crellin	8	0	5+0	0	2+0	0	0+0	0	1+0	0
32	FW	(England) ENG	Harvey Saunders	10	0	0+6	0	0+1	0	0+0	0	2+1	0
34	FW	(England) ENG	Gerard Garner	3	0	0+0	0	0+1	0	0+0	0	0+2	0
36	MF	(England) ENG	Jay Matete	3	0	0+0	0	0+0	0	0+0	0	1+2	0
41	DF	(England) ENG	Harrison Holgate	1	0	0+0	0	0+0	0	0+0	0	1+0	0
44	FW	(England) ENG	Cian Hayes	1	0	0+0	0	0+0	0	0+0	0	0+1	0
46	FW	(England) ENG	Shayden Morris	1	0	0+0	0	0+0	0	0+0	0	0+1	0
Players out on loan:
10	FW	(England) ENG	Conor McAleny	17	2	4+8	1	1+1	1	0+1	0	2+0	0
14	DF	(Wales) WAL	Macauley Southam-Hales	3	0	0+1	0	0+0	0	0+0	0	2+0	0
22	FW	(England) ENG	Ashley Hunter	19	1	1+13	0	0+1	1	1+0	0	3+0	0
29	DF	(England) ENG	Nathan Sheron	1	0	0+0	0	0+0	0	0+0	0	1+0	0
Players who left the club:
4	DF	(England) ENG	Peter Clarke	17	3	11+1	1	0+0	0	1+0	0	4+0	2
5	DF	(England) ENG	Ashley Eastham	15	0	5+4	0	3+0	0	0+0	0	3+0	0
12	DF	(Republic of Ireland) IRL	Jimmy Dunne	11	1	9+0	1	0+0	0	0+0	0	2+0	0
23	MF	(Scotland) SCO	Ross Wallace	4	0	0+3	0	0+0	0	0+1	0	0+0	0
40	FW	(Wales) WAL	Dan Mooney	2	0	0+1	0	0+0	0	0+0	0	1+0	0

==== Goals record ====
As of 26 March 2020

Rank	No.	Nat.	Po.	Name	League One	FA Cup	League Cup	League Trophy	Total
1	17	(Republic of Ireland)	CF	Paddy Madden	15	1	0	3	19
2	9	(Wales)	CF	Ched Evans	9	1	0	0	10
2	11	(England)	LM	Josh Morris	7	1	0	2	10
4	3	(England)	LB	Danny Andrew	2	0	0	2	4
4	7	(Wales)	RW	Wes Burns	2	0	0	2	4
6	~~4~~	(England)	CB	Peter Clarke	1	0	0	2	3
6	6	(Australia)	CB	Harry Souttar	3	0	0	0	3
8	4	(England)	CB	Callum Connolly	2	0	0	0	2
8	8	(England)	CM	Kyle Dempsey	2	0	0	0	2
8	10	(England)	CF	Conor McAleny	1	1	0	0	2
8	21	(England)	LW	Barrie McKay	2	0	0	0	2
12	2	(England)	RB	Lewie Coyle	1	0	0	0	1
12	~~12~~	(Republic of Ireland)	CB	Jimmy Dunne	1	0	0	0	1
12	15	(Scotland)	CM	Paul Coutts	0	0	0	1	1
12	22	(England)	CF	Ashley Hunter	0	1	0	0	1
12	28	(England)	CM	Jack Sowerby	0	0	0	1	1
Total					48	5	0	13	66

==== Disciplinary record ====
As of 26 March 2020

Rank	No.	Nat.	Po.	Name	League One			FA Cup			League Cup			League Trophy			Total		
Rank	No.	Nat.	Po.	Name	Booked	(yellow card) (yellow-red card)	Sent off (straight red)	Booked	(yellow card) (yellow-red card)	Sent off (straight red)	Booked	(yellow card) (yellow-red card)	Sent off (straight red)	Booked	(yellow card) (yellow-red card)	Sent off (straight red)	Booked	(yellow card) (yellow-red card)	Sent off (straight red)
1	2	(England)	RB	Lewie Coyle	8	0	0	0	0	0	1	0	0	0	0	0	9	0	0
2	9	(Wales)	CF	Ched Evans	5	0	1	1	0	0	0	0	0	1	0	0	7	0	1
2	17	(Republic of Ireland)	CF	Paddy Madden	8	0	0	0	0	0	0	0	0	0	0	0	8	0	0
4	15	(Scotland)	DM	Paul Coutts	7	0	0	0	0	0	0	0	0	0	0	0	7	0	0
5	3	(England)	LB	Danny Andrew	5	0	0	1	0	0	0	0	0	0	0	0	6	0	0
6	4	(England)	CB	Callum Connolly	5	0	0	0	0	0	0	0	0	0	0	0	5	0	0
7	1	(England)	GK	Alex Cairns	4	0	0	0	0	0	0	0	0	0	0	0	4	0	0
7	~~4~~	(England)	CB	Peter Clarke	3	0	0	0	0	0	0	0	0	1	0	0	4	0	0
7	7	(Wales)	RW	Wes Burns	3	0	0	1	0	0	0	0	0	0	0	0	4	0	0
7	22	(England)	CF	Ashley Hunter	2	0	0	0	0	0	0	0	0	2	0	0	4	0	0
7	28	(England)	CM	Jack Sowerby	3	0	0	0	0	0	0	0	0	1	0	0	4	0	0
12	6	(Australia)	CB	Harry Souttar	3	0	0	0	0	0	0	0	0	0	0	0	3	0	0
12	12	(Republic of Ireland)	CM	Glenn Whelan	3	0	0	0	0	0	0	0	0	0	0	0	3	0	0
14	8	(England)	CM	Kyle Dempsey	2	0	0	0	0	0	0	0	0	0	0	0	2	0	0
14	16	(England)	CM	Jordan Rossiter	1	0	0	0	0	0	0	0	0	1	0	0	2	0	0
14	21	(Scotland)	LM	Barrie McKay	2	0	0	0	0	0	0	0	0	0	0	0	2	0	0
14	27	(England)	CM	Harrison Biggins	1	0	0	0	0	0	0	0	0	0	0	1	1	0	1
18	10	(England)	CF	Conor McAleny	0	0	0	0	0	0	1	0	0	0	0	0	1	0	0
18	11	(England)	LM	Josh Morris	0	0	0	0	0	0	1	0	0	0	0	0	1	0	0
18	~~12~~	(Republic of Ireland)	CB	Jimmy Dunne	1	0	0	0	0	0	0	0	0	0	0	0	1	0	0
18	19	(England)	CB	Lewis Gibson	1	0	0	0	0	0	0	0	0	0	0	0	1	0	0
18	~~23~~	(Scotland)	RM	Ross Wallace	0	0	0	0	0	0	1	0	0	0	0	0	1	0	0
18	30	(Northern Ireland)	CM	Barry Baggley	0	0	0	0	0	0	0	0	0	1	0	0	1	0	0
18	32	(England)	CF	Harvey Saunders	1	0	0	0	0	0	0	0	0	0	0	0	1	0	0
Total					67	0	1	3	0	0	4	0	0	7	0	1	81	0	1
