= Ched Evans =

Welsh footballer (born 1988)

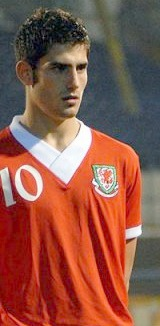
- Evans before a Wales under-21 game

Personal information
- Full name: Chedwyn Michael Evans
- Date of birth: 28 December 1988 (age 37)
- Place of birth: Rhyl, Wales
- Height: 6 ft 0 in (1.83 m)
- Position: Striker

Team information
- Current team: Fleetwood Town
- Number: 17

Youth career
- 1999–2000: Rhyl
- 2000–2002: Chester City
- 2002–2007: Manchester City

Senior career*
Years	Team	Apps	(Gls)
2007–2009	Manchester City	16	(1)
2007–2008	→ Norwich City (loan)	28	(10)
2009–2012	Sheffield United	103	(42)
2016–2017	Chesterfield	25	(5)
2017–2019	Sheffield United	9	(0)
2018–2019	→ Fleetwood Town (loan)	39	(17)
2019–2021	Fleetwood Town	45	(14)
2021	→ Preston North End (loan)	2	(0)
2021–2025	Preston North End	94	(16)
2025–	Fleetwood Town	30	(4)

International career
2006–2007	Wales U19	4	(1)
2007–2009	Wales U21	13	(13)
2008–2011	Wales	13	(1)
- * Club domestic league appearances and goals as of 11:54, 19 February 2026 (UTC)

Chedwyn Michael Evans (born 28 December 1988) is a Welsh footballer who plays as a striker for EFL League Two club Fleetwood Town.

Born in Rhyl, Evans was signed by Manchester City from Chester City's youth set up in 2002 and he subsequently progressed through the ranks. Evans was loaned to Norwich City in 2007, where he scored 10 goals in 28 league appearances, before returning to his parent club. With first team opportunities at City limited he was subsequently sold to Sheffield United for £3 million in 2009. After an unspectacular first two seasons at Bramall Lane he scored 35 goals during the 2011–12 season. He also represented Wales at Wales under-21 and senior level, scoring on his debut for the national side in 2008, and making a total of 13 appearances.

== Club career ==
=== Manchester City ===
Evans began his playing career in Rhyl, before spending two seasons in Chester City's youth set-up from where he moved to Manchester City in 2002 following the closure of Chester's youth team. During the 2006–07 season, Evans was a regular in the academy and reserve teams and was also in the side that reached the final of the 2006 FA Youth Cup, where City lost to Liverpool. In May 2007, Evans signed his first professional contract with Manchester City.

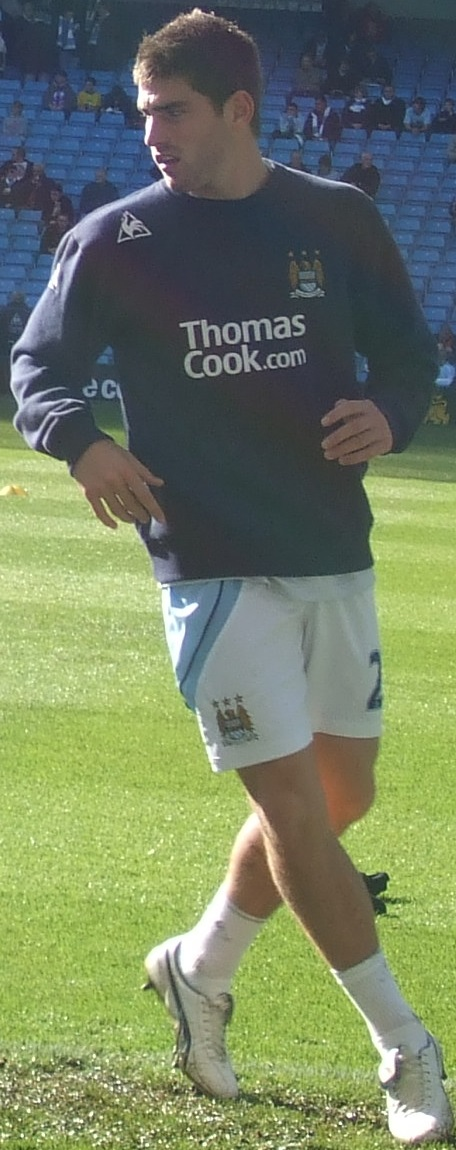
Evans warming up before a Manchester City game in 2008

In September 2007 Evans came off the bench to make his senior debut in City's 1–0 League Cup victory against Norwich City. With first choice opportunities at City limited, Evans moved on loan to Norwich City in November of that year, agreeing a deal until 1 January 2008. He made his debut for Norwich the following week when he came on as a substitute in the 3–1 victory over Blackpool. His first goal for the club came two games later, and just two minutes into his first start in a 2–1 victory over Plymouth Argyle at the start of December. Evans returned to Manchester City after his initial loan deal expired in January 2008, having made eight appearances and scored two goals.

Initially, Norwich manager Glenn Roeder's attempts to extend the loan were refused, however, on 10 January, the two clubs agreed a deal to allow Evans to return to Norwich on loan until 26 February, with Manchester City able to recall him after an initial period. However, after talks between the two clubs at the end of January 2008, the deal was extended to allow Evans to stay with the Carrow Road club until the end of the season. Then Manchester City manager Sven-Göran Eriksson stated he had no plans to sell Evans and that he would not be leaving the summer transfer window. Evans played regularly for Norwich for the remainder of his loan spell and by the end of the season he had notched up 10 goals from 20 starts and eight substitute appearances.

Evans made his Premier League debut for Manchester City in the opening game of the following season on 18 August, against Aston Villa. He was not chosen for the starting eleven but replaced Valeri Bojinov, who suffered an injury during the pre-game warm-up. Evans scored his first Premier League goal for Manchester City against Portsmouth on 21 September, scoring the fifth goal as City went on to win 6–0. With City's acquisition of Craig Bellamy and later Emmanuel Adebayor, Roque Santa Cruz and Carlos Tevez, Evans opted to leave in 2009 in order to get more first team football.

=== Sheffield United ===
Evans joined Sheffield United for a fee of £3 million on a three-year deal in July 2009, making his debut for United in the first game of the new season; a 0–0 draw with Middlesbrough. Having bagged a brace for the Wales U21s during the midweek fixtures he then scored his first goal in Blades colours on his home debut, a 2–0 win over Watford. Despite a promising start Evans struggled to maintain any real form and was often relegated to the role of substitute during his first season with the Blades, making 36 appearances but scoring only four goals. The following season Evans was a regular first team choice and his form and scoring rate began to improve, despite the club going through a season of turmoil and battling against relegation. He finished the campaign as top scorer with nine goals in all competitions, but was unable to prevent the team dropping out of the division.

With the Blades now in League One there was speculation that Evans would be sold to ease the club's wage bill but an injury picked up in the last days of the previous campaign meant he was unavailable until early September, preventing him from moving on to another club. Having returned from injury Evans hit a rich vein of form scoring regularly in both league and cup competitions as the Blades contested for promotion. On 28 March 2012 he scored a second-half hat trick within 15 minutes against Chesterfield giving him his thirtieth goal of the season in a 4–1 win for Sheffield United at Bramall Lane. During this impressive third season, Evans drew attention from Championship and Premier League clubs with his contract scheduled to expire in the summer. However, Blades manager Danny Wilson stated that Evans "[wasn't] even thinking about leaving Bramall Lane", adding "Of course we don't want to lose Ched." Evans was named League One Player of the Month for March 2012, having scored 10 goals in 8 games. He was nominated for 'League One Player of the Season', and in April 2012 Evans was named in the League One PFA Team of the Year. He ended the season with 35 goals in all competitions, but following his rape conviction Evans was released by United at the end of the season.

=== Chesterfield ===
On 20 June 2016, Evans signed his first contract since his release from prison and the quashing of his conviction, signing for one year at Chesterfield in League One. He was signed by his former Sheffield United manager Wilson, and their first-team coach was his former Blades teammate Chris Morgan.

He scored on his debut for Chesterfield on 23 July, his first game in nearly four years, in a 3–0 pre-season friendly win over Ilkeston. He also scored, with a free-kick from 25 yards (23 m), on his return to professional football, in a 1–1 away draw with Oxford United, on 6 August 2016. In his home debut for Chesterfield, on 13 August 2016 against Swindon Town, Evans produced a match-winning performance, scoring Chesterfield's third goal and having a hand in the other two from Gary Liddle and Jay O'Shea as they won 3–1.

=== Return to Sheffield United ===
On 8 May 2017, Evans was signed by Championship side Sheffield United, his former club, having had several talks with Chris Wilder. On his first match back at the club, he turned in a man-of-the-match performance as the Blades beat Walsall in the EFL Cup.

=== Fleetwood Town ===
In July 2018, having failed to score a single goal for the Blades since his return to Bramall Lane, Evans signed a season-long loan deal with League One club Fleetwood Town. He scored his first goal for Fleetwood on 11 August in a 2–0 away win against Oxford United. It was his first goal since 2016 when he was playing for Chesterfield. Following his debut goal, Evans left the pitch to a standing ovation from Fleetwood fans.

He was transfer-listed by Sheffield United at the end of the 2018–19 season, with Fleetwood signing him permanently on 6 August 2019 for an undisclosed fee. In December 2020, Fleetwood manager Joey Barton announced that Evans had left the club due to "disciplinary reasons".

=== Preston North End ===
On 6 January 2021, Evans joined Championship side Preston North End on a short-term loan. He scored his first goal for Preston in a 2–1 loss to Rotherham United on 6 February 2021. On 6 February, he signed a permanent contract with the club. On 12 April 2021, Evans extended his contract with the club until the summer of 2023, another two years on top of the original deal signed in February. On 13 January 2023, Evans extended his contract until the summer of 2024.

On 5 April 2023, the club confirmed that Evans would be unavailable for an extended period of time after developing a serious medical condition. The condition came as a result of repeated high-force contact, requiring surgery to address his current symptoms and to prevent any future damage. He returned to action six months later, starting for Preston in their match against Millwall in October 2023.

On 28 June 2024, Evans signed as a player/coach with Preston, thus extending his playing contract.

=== Fleetwood Town return ===
In July 2025, Evans returned to Fleetwood Town signing a one-year contract. After scoring six goals in 48 appearances, he renewed his stay for a further year.

== International career ==
=== Wales U21s ===
Evans gained his first Wales U21 cap in 2007. He became a regular member of the squad and in November 2007 he scored a hat-trick against France U21s. In doing so he became only the fourth player to have scored a hat-trick for the under-21 side, along with John Hartson, Craig Davies and Lee Jones. Evans scored a brace against Bosnia and Herzegovina U21s in October 2009, taking his tally for the Welsh U21s to 13 goals in 12 games.

=== Wales ===
Evans made his senior debut for Wales on 28 May 2008, scoring the winning goal (with a back heel) in a 1–0 away friendly victory against Iceland. He made 13 appearances for Wales in total, scoring once.

== Personal life ==
Evans was born in Rhyl, Clwyd.

After signing for Sheffield United, Evans moved to Millhouse Green, Penistone, in the nearby Barnsley area. After the death of former Wales boss and Sheffield United player, coach and manager Gary Speed, Evans revealed a message under his shirt after scoring his first goal in the FA Cup win over Torquay United, which read "Rest in peace Speedo".

Evans was engaged for several years to Natasha Massey. It was reported that Evans married Massey in 2022. Massey's father, Karl, a businessman, funded a website, "Chedevans.com", which proclaimed Evans to be "wrongly convicted of rape on 20th April 2012". He also hired lawyers for an appeal. Speaking to ITV1's This Morning in 2014, Natasha Massey said that when she found out Evans had been questioned over rape, her first instinct was to be "protective" and to stand by him. She said: "My thoughts and feelings over the cheating were put to one side and I stepped in to help him through this terrible time."

== Rape trial ==
Evans and another footballer, Clayton McDonald, were tried at the Crown Court at Caernarfon after being indicted of the rape of a 19-year-old woman, who was alleged to be too drunk to consent, at a hotel near Rhyl in May 2011. Evans was convicted on 20 April 2012 and was sentenced to five years' imprisonment. He was eligible for release on licence after serving half of that sentence. During this time, Evans worked as a painter and decorator in prison. In August 2012, he was refused leave to appeal against the conviction by a Court of Appeal of England and Wales judge and the full court upheld the decision in November. Evans continued to maintain his innocence and in November 2013 recruited a new legal team to attempt to clear his name.

After serving half of his prison sentence, Evans was eligible for release, and was released on licence on 17 October 2014. Following his release, the Criminal Cases Review Commission announced that they were reviewing his conviction. In January 2015, it was reported that Evans had submitted fresh evidence to the Criminal Cases Review Commission, to attempt to strengthen his case. In October 2015, the Criminal Cases Review Commission, following a 10-month investigation and relying on "new material which was not considered by the jury at trial", referred the case to the Court of Appeal.

On 22 March 2016, the case was heard by the Court of Appeal. On 21 April 2016, the appeal was allowed, the conviction quashed and a retrial ordered. The Court of Appeal imposed a ban on reporting details of the legal argument. The retrial began on 4 October 2016 and on 14 October Evans was found not guilty. After the retrial, it could then be reported that the legal argument used in the appeal had related to the complainant's sexual history. On 11 April 2019, Evans accepted an £800,000 settlement from the legal firm which represented him in his first trial.

== Attempts to find a new club prior to his acquittal ==
=== Sheffield United ===
In April 2014, Sheffield United co-chairman Kevin McCabe and new manager Nigel Clough met with Evans in HM Prison Wymott to discuss the possibility of Sheffield United re-signing Evans after his release from prison. Following speculation that Evans could rejoin his former club, a petition was signed by 150,000 people urging the club not to do so, which stated that it would be a "deep insult to the woman who was raped and to all women like her who have suffered at the hands of a rapist".

In November 2014, following his release, it was announced that Evans would resume training with Sheffield United after the Professional Footballers' Association had requested that Sheffield United let Evans train at the club as they were his last club before his conviction. The decision was controversial, and caused television presenter Charlie Webster, businesswoman Lindsay Graham and musicians Dave Berry and Paul Heaton to resign as patrons of the club. Athlete Jessica Ennis-Hill stated that she would want her name removed from a stand at Bramall Lane if Evans was signed by the club.

The Football League stated that although they recognised the gravity of Evans' crime, they valued the reintegration of reformed criminals and could not take any action against any club which would hire Evans. Sheffield United manager Nigel Clough said on 12 November that the club were "nowhere near" signing Evans, citing his 30 months out of the professional game and an important run of fixtures as reasons why a decision would not be taken immediately. DBL Logistics, Sheffield United's sponsor on the back of their shirts, stated that they would end their sponsorship if Evans was signed by the club. John Holland Sales, who sponsor on the front of the shirts, declared that they would "re-evaluate" their relation to the club if he were signed. On 20 November, Sheffield United withdrew their offer to allow Evans to use their training facilities. Co-chairman Jim Phipps, however, attributed the decision to "mob-like behaviour", stating his belief that Evans had a right to return to his career having served his sentence.

=== Hartlepool United ===
In December 2014, Hartlepool United manager Ronnie Moore said that he would like Evans to join the club. The comment brought criticism from Hartlepool's MP, Iain Wright, who described Evans as a "pariah". The club later followed up this headline with a statement saying that Hartlepool does not wish to sign Evans.

=== Hibernians ===
On 2 January 2015, Hibernians of the Maltese Premier League, through their English vice-president, the criminal Stephen Vaughan, announced that they had offered Evans a contract up to the end of the season. The British Ministry of Justice said that such a move would not be possible as Evans was a convicted sex offender on licence and, as such, barred from working abroad. Malta's Prime Minister, Joseph Muscat, warned Hibernians that hiring Evans could affect the whole country's reputation, while Justice Minister Owen Bonnici stated that Evans had a right to return to his profession after being released from prison.

=== Oldham Athletic ===
On 4 January 2015, it was reported that Evans had been in discussion with League One club Oldham Athletic and was expected to sign for them in a deal which may be worth as little as £400 per week. The club's manager Lee Johnson was reported to have expressed "grave reservations" about the signing, but was overruled by the club's owner Simon Corney. A petition against the signing gathered 19,000 signatures within a few hours and over 30,000 by the next day, while politicians such as Labour Party leader Ed Miliband voiced their opposition to the move.

On 8 January, Oldham Athletic ended their interest in signing Evans, citing that proceeding could have resulted in "significant financial pressure" and would have "continued to be a divisive influence", while condemning the "vile and abusive threats, some including death threats, which have been made to our fans, sponsors and staff". BBC Sport reported that a named relative of a staff member was threatened with rape, and that one sponsor already having ended their association with Oldham in protest and another saying that it would follow suit if Evans signed. The petition against Evans signing had reached over 60,000 signatures. Meanwhile, a total of ten other clubs (other than Oldham and Sheffield United) from League One and League Two told BBC Sport that they would not sign Evans.

Evans stated that he withdrew from the deal due to "mob rule", and that he was concerned the building of Oldham's new stand would be adversely affected by his signing. He also apologised for any grievances he had caused due to his rape case, but maintained his innocence. Journalist Henry Winter, writing for The Daily Telegraph, rebutted Evans' claims, instead saying that "it was people's disgust that a convicted rapist felt he could swan back into a high-profile job after revealing no remorse for a crime that would preclude re-employment for many", while criticising Evans for making "his statement of contrition ... on the offensive, legally questionable website that continues to make life miserable for his victim".

=== Grimsby Town ===
On 8 January 2015, it was announced by Grimsby Town director John Fenty that a financial backer had offered the club to pay Evans' full wages in order to bring him to the Conference Premier club. Having held a board meeting along with team manager Paul Hurst it was decided that the move would be of too high risk for the club. Grimsby had previously employed Clayton McDonald, the fellow footballer and friend of Evans who was acquitted in the same case, during the 2013–14 season.

== Career statistics ==
=== Club ===
As of match played 16 August 2025

Appearances and goals by club, season and competition
Club	Season	League			FA Cup		League Cup		Europe		Other		Total	
Club	Season	Division	Apps	Goals	Apps	Goals	Apps	Goals	Apps	Goals	Apps	Goals	Apps	Goals
Manchester City	2007–08	Premier League	0	0	0	0	1	0	—		—		1	0
Manchester City	2008–09	Premier League	16	1	0	0	1	0	8 (Note: Appearances in UEFA Cup)	0	—		25	1
Manchester City	Total		16	1	0	0	2	0	8	0	—		26	1
Norwich City (loan)	2007–08	Championship	28	10	0	0	0	0	—		—		28	10
Sheffield United	2009–10	Championship	33	4	3	0	0	0	—		—		36	4
Sheffield United	2010–11	Championship	34	9	1	0	0	0	—		—		35	9
Sheffield United	2011–12	League One	36	29	4	5	0	0	—		2 (Note: Appearance(s) in Football League Trophy)	1	42	35
Sheffield United	Total		103	42	8	5	0	0	—		2	1	113	48
Chesterfield	2016–17	League One	25	5	2	1	1	0	—		1	1	29	7
Sheffield United	2017–18	Championship	9	0	2	0	2	0	—		—		13	0
Fleetwood Town (loan)	2018–19	League One	39	17	2	1	0	0	—		0	0	41	18
Fleetwood Town	2019–20	League One	28	9	3	1	0	0	—		4 (Note: Appearances in Football League Trophy and League One Play-offs)	2	35	12
Fleetwood Town	2020–21	League One	17	5	1	0	3	2	—		2	0	23	7
Fleetwood Town	Total		84	31	6	2	3	2	—		6	2	99	37
Preston North End (loan)	2020–21	Championship	2	0	0	0	0	0	—		—		2	0
Preston North End	2020–21	Championship	19	5	0	0	0	0	—		—		19	5
Preston North End	2021–22	Championship	23	2	1	0	0	0	—		—		24	2
Preston North End	2022–23	Championship	26	9	1	0	1	0	—		—		28	9
Preston North End	2023–24	Championship	18	0	1	0	0	0	—		—		19	0
Preston North End	2024–25	Championship	8	0	2	0	0	0	—		—		10	0
Preston North End	Total		94	16	5	0	1	0	—		—		100	16
Fleetwood Town	2025–26	League Two	3	0	0	0	1	0	—		0	0	4	0
Career total			364	105	23	8	10	2	8	0	9	4	414	119

=== International ===
As of 5 May 2012

National team	Season	Apps	Goals
Wales	2008	7	1
Wales	2009	4	0
Wales	2010	1	0
Wales	2011	1	0
Total		13	1

== Honours ==
Individual

- PFA Team of the Year: 2011–12 League One
