= Alex Cairns =

English footballer (born 1993)

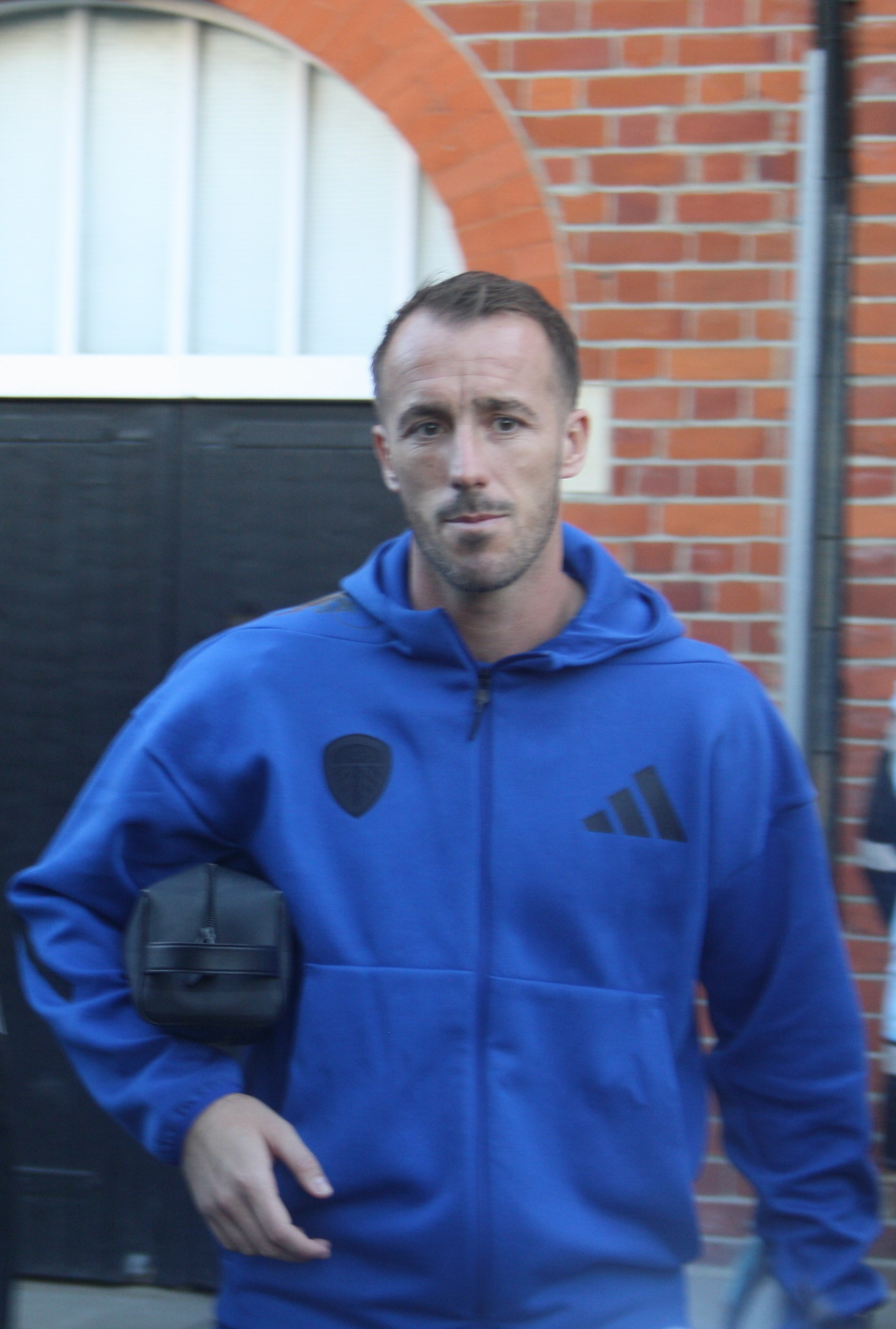
- Cairns with Leeds United in 2025

Personal information
- Full name: Alex Thomas Cairns
- Date of birth: 4 January 1993 (age 33)
- Place of birth: Doncaster, England
- Height: 6 ft 0 in (1.83 m)
- Position: Goalkeeper

Team information
- Current team: Leeds United
- Number: 21

Youth career
- –2011: Leeds United

Senior career*
Years	Team	Apps	(Gls)
2011–2015	Leeds United	1	(0)
2012	→ Barrow (loan)	0	(0)
2012–2013	→ Stalybridge Celtic (loan)	38	(0)
2015–2016	Chesterfield	0	(0)
2016	Rotherham United	0	(0)
2016–2023	Fleetwood Town	209	(0)
2022	→ Hartlepool United (loan)	0	(0)
2023	→ Salford City (loan)	23	(0)
2023–2024	Salford City	46	(0)
2024–	Leeds United	0	(0)
- * Club domestic league appearances and goals as of 15:54, 5 May 2025 (UTC)

Alex Thomas Cairns (born 4 January 1993) is an English professional footballer who plays as a goalkeeper for Premier League club Leeds United.

Cairns is a graduate of the Leeds United academy, but made just one first team appearance before being released by the club in 2015. He also had loan spells with Barrow and Stalybridge Celtic while at Leeds. Following his release, he had spells with Chesterfield and Rotherham United but failed to play for either before signing for Fleetwood Town in summer 2016. Across a seven-year spell with Fleetwood, he made 240 appearances in all competitions. During the 2022–23 season, he joined Hartlepool United on an emergency loan, and then spent the second half of the season on loan at Salford City, who he joined permanently in summer 2023. After one full season at Salford, he rejoined Leeds United in July 2024.

== Career ==
=== Leeds United ===
Cairns began his career in the Leeds United youth academy and turned professional with the club at the end of the 2010–11 season by signing a one-year contract along with fellow youth players and twins Nathan and Lewis Turner. The following season would see Cairns join the senior team as cover for Paul Rachubka after first choice goalkeeper Andy Lonergan sustained a finger injury. Rachubka's time in the side was marked by a series of errors; three of which would come in the first half of a league match against his former club Blackpool. With Leeds 3–0 down at half time, Cairns replaced him for the second half, conceding twice as Blackpool won 5–0.

Following the Blackpool game, manager Simon Grayson expressed his doubts as to whether Cairns was ready to take on the responsibility of starting in the first-team for the remaining period of Lonergan's absence. Prior to the next match against Leicester City, Grayson brought in young Reading goalkeeper Alex McCarthy on an emergency loan. Nevertheless, Cairns was promoted ahead of Rachubka and retained his position on the bench for the following weeks until Grayson signed veteran goalkeeper Maik Taylor on a short-term basis to act as cover. Cairns signed a new two-year deal at the club on 19 January.

After an injury to Jamie Ashdown for the final home game of the season, Cairns was recalled to Leeds from Conference North club Stalybridge Celtic on 26 April 2013, and was named on the bench against Brighton & Hove Albion on 27 April. Following an injury to Ashdown during the following pre-season, Cairns was promoted to second choice goalkeeper, providing backup for Paddy Kenny and then loan goalkeeper Jack Butland. He remained the second choice at Leeds even after Kenny's return from injury. On 16 May 2014, Cairns extended his contract with Leeds by a further year. On 13 May 2015, Cairns was released by Leeds United after his contract expired.

==== Loan to Barrow ====
At the end of the January transfer window, Cairns joined Conference National club Barrow on a one-month loan. Cairns failed to play a game for Barrow after being an unused substitute in several games and returned to Leeds on 2 March after his loan at Barrow expired. He made no further appearances in the first-team squad at Leeds for the remainder of the season as new manager Neil Warnock favoured five outfield players on the bench.

==== Loan to Stalybridge Celtic ====
After falling down the pecking order at Leeds following the signings of two new goalkeepers, Cairns joined Conference North club Stalybridge Celtic on a month-long loan after first-choice goalkeeper Andy Ralph suffered a suspected broken leg in the Badgers' opening game of the season. He made his debut for the club at their Bower Field ground in a 1–1 draw against Gainsborough Trinity and kept his first clean sheet later that week in a 0–0 stalemate against Droylsden. He featured for Celtic in a 2–1 friendly victory over a Manchester United XI which included Darren Fletcher and Alexander Büttner on 11 September. He remained an ever-present for the club since arriving until he was substituted in an early-round FA Cup match on 22 September against Vauxhall Motors after sustaining a dead-leg following a collision with an opposing player. His loan spell was extended until the end of November during which he reached the final qualifying round of the FA Cup with the Badgers, before succumbing to Conference National club Stockport County in a 3–5 defeat at Edgeley Park.

At Stalybridge Celtic's end of season awards on 27 April 2013, Cairns won the Player of the Year, Players' Player of the Year and Supporters' Player of the Year awards.

=== Chesterfield ===
On 29 July 2015, Cairns signed a six-month contract at League One club Chesterfield. He left the club on 7 January 2016 after his contract expired, having made no appearances.

=== Rotherham United ===
The day after his release from Chesterfield, Cairns signed a contract with Championship club Rotherham United until the end of the season. The move reunited him with manager Neil Redfearn, who had previously been his academy manager at Leeds United.

=== Fleetwood Town ===
In July 2016, Cairns signed for League One club Fleetwood Town, where he went on to establish himself in the first team. He played a total of 81 games in his first two seasons at the club, keeping 34 clean sheets. In April 2017, he signed a new four-year contract with the club. In March 2021, he signed a new contract with the club, valid until summer 2023.

==== Loan to Hartlepool United ====
On 26 November 2022, Cairns joined League Two club Hartlepool United on a seven-day emergency loan deal.

=== Salford City ===
On 4 January 2023, Cairns joined League Two club Salford City on loan for the remainder of the 2022–23 season. On 23 June, Cairns signed a permanent deal with Salford City.

=== Return to Leeds United ===
On 8 July 2024, Cairns rejoined Championship club Leeds United on a two year contract.

== Personal life ==
In November 2014, Cairns' 16-year-old brother Blake was killed in a two car collision in Conisbrough alongside four other teenagers, three of whom attended Danum Academy Sixth Form with the other having previously attended the Sixth Form. His funeral was attended by Cairns and several members of the Leeds first-team squad.

== Career statistics ==
As of 27 April 2024

Appearances and goals by club, season and competition
Club	Season	League			FA Cup		League Cup		Other		Total	
Club	Season	Division	Apps	Goals	Apps	Goals	Apps	Goals	Apps	Goals	Apps	Goals
Leeds United	2011–12	Championship	1	0	0	0	0	0	—		1	0
Leeds United	2012–13	Championship	0	0	0	0	0	0	—		0	0
Leeds United	2013–14	Championship	0	0	0	0	0	0	—		0	0
Leeds United	2014–15	Championship	0	0	0	0	0	0	—		0	0
Leeds United	Total		1	0	0	0	0	0	0	0	1	0
Barrow (loan)	2011–12	Conference National	0	0	0	0	—		0	0	0	0
Stalybridge Celtic (loan)	2012–13	Conference North	38	0	3	0	—		1 (Note: Appearance in FA Trophy)	0	42	0
Chesterfield	2015–16	League One	0	0	0	0	0	0	0	0	0	0
Rotherham United	2015–16	Championship	0	0	—		—		—		0	0
Fleetwood Town	2016–17	League One	30	0	5	0	0	0	3 (Note: One appearance in EFL Trophy and two in League One play-offs)	0	38	0
Fleetwood Town	2017–18	League One	38	0	2	0	1	0	2 (Note: Appearance(s) in EFL Trophy)	0	43	0
Fleetwood Town	2018–19	League One	46	0	3	0	1	0	0	0	50	0
Fleetwood Town	2019–20	League One	25	0	1	0	1	0	5 (Note: Three appearances in EFL Trophy and two in League One play-offs)	0	32	0
Fleetwood Town	2020–21	League One	28	0	0	0	3	0	2	0	33	0
Fleetwood Town	2021–22	League One	42	0	1	0	1	0	0	0	44	0
Fleetwood Town	2022–23	League One	0	0	—		0	0	—		0	0
Fleetwood Town	Total		209	0	12	0	7	0	12	0	240	0
Hartlepool United (loan)	2022–23	League Two	0	0	1	0	—		—		1	0
Salford City (loan)	2022–23	League Two	23	0	—		—		3	0	26	0
Salford City	2023–24	League Two	46	0	2	0	3	0	0	0	51	0
Leeds United	2024–25	Championship	0	0	0	0	0	0	0	0	0	0
Total			317	0	18	0	10	0	16	0	361	0

== Honours ==
Leeds United

- EFL Championship: 2024–25
