= Eddie Clarke (footballer) =

English footballer

Personal information
- Full name: Edmond Clarke
- Date of birth: 29 December 1998 (age 27)
- Position: Left back

Team information
- Current team: Vauxhall Motors

Youth career
- –2016: Tranmere Rovers

Senior career*
Years	Team	Apps	(Gls)
2016–2018	Tranmere Rovers	16	(0)
2018–2020	Fleetwood Town	2	(0)
2019–2020	→ Macclesfield Town (loan)	6	(0)
2020	→ Stockport County (loan)	4	(0)
2020–2021	Warrington Town	1	(0)
2021	Flint Town United	13	(0)
2021–2023	Warrington Town	20	(2)
2023	Bootle	9	(0)
2023–2024	Connah's Quay Nomads	10	(0)
2024–2025	Bala Town	15	(1)
2025–	Vauxhall Motors	0	(0)
- * Club domestic league appearances and goals as of 13:23, 27 June 2025 (UTC)

Edmond Clarke (born 29 December 1998) is an English professional footballer who plays as a left back for Northern Premier League Division One West club Vauxhall Motors.

== Career ==
Clarke began his career with Tranmere Rovers. In the 2018 National League play-off final at Wembley, Clarke was substituted on for Larnell Cole after only nine minutes; Clarke played the rest of the game as ten-man Tranmere won 2-1 to return to the English Football League.

Clarke signed for Fleetwood Town in May 2018. On 22 July 2019, Clarke joined League Two side Macclesfield Town on a season-long loan deal. On 16 January 2020, Clarke was recalled by Fleetwood and joined National League side Stockport County on loan until the end of the season.

In October 2020, Fleetwood cancelled Clarke's contract by mutual consent and he subsequently signed a contract for Northern Premier League Premier Division side Warrington Town in November. In January 2021 he signed for Cymru Premier side Flint Town United on a short-term deal following the suspension of the Northern Premier League due to COVID-19. He returned to sign for Warrington Town for the 2021–22 season. Having departed at the end of the 2021–22 season, Clarke remained with the club for injury rehabilitation and following his return to full fitness, re-signed in October 2022. Clarke departed the club by mutual consent in January 2023. On 4 February 2023, he signed for Bootle.

In June 2025, Clarke joined Northern Premier League Division One West side Vauxhall Motors.

== Career statistics ==
As of end of 2022–23 season

Appearances and goals by club, season and competition
Club	Season	League			FA Cup		League Cup		Other		Total	
Club	Season	Division	Apps	Goals	Apps	Goals	Apps	Goals	Apps	Goals	Apps	Goals
Tranmere Rovers	2016–17	National League	1	0	0	0	0	0	0	0	1	0
Tranmere Rovers	2017–18	National League	15	0	0	0	0	0	1 (Note: Appearance in the FA Trophy.)	0	16	0
Tranmere Rovers	Total		16	0	0	0	0	0	1	0	17	0
Fleetwood Town	2018–19	League One	2	0	0	0	0	0	3 (Note: Appearance(s) in EFL Trophy.)	0	5	0
Fleetwood Town	2019–20	League One	0	0	0	0	0	0	0	0	0	0
Fleetwood Town	Total		2	0	0	0	0	0	3	0	5	0
Macclesfield Town (loan)	2019–20	League Two	6	0	1	0	1	0	2	0	10	0
Stockport County (loan)	2019–20	National League	4	0	0	0	0	0	0	0	4	0
Warrington Town	2020–21	NPL Premier Division	1	0	0	0	0	0	1	0	2	0
Flint Town United	2020–21	Cymru Premier	13	0	0	0	0	0	0	0	13	0
Warrington Town	2021–22	NPL Premier Division	20	2	2	0	—		2 (Note: Appearance(s) in Northern Premier League Premier Division play-offs)	0	24	2
Bootle	2022–23	NPL Division One West	9	0	0	0	—		1 (Note: Appearance(s) in Liverpool Senior Cup)	0	10	0
Career total			71	2	3	0	1	0	10	0	85	2
