= Sam Finley =

English footballer (born 1992)

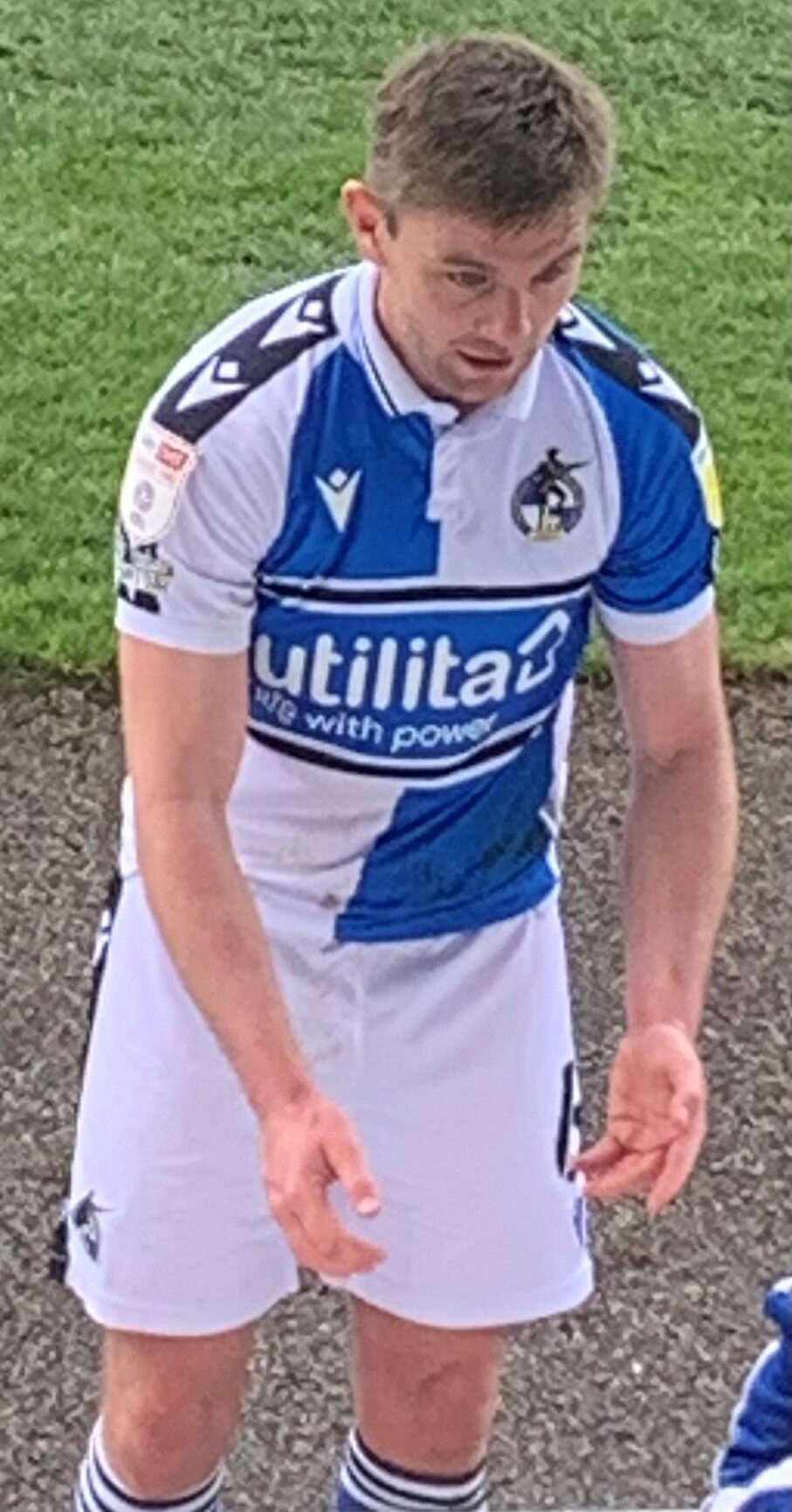
- Finley with Bristol Rovers in 2022

Personal information
- Full name: Samuel Joseph Finley
- Date of birth: 4 August 1992 (age 34)
- Place of birth: Liverpool, England
- Height: 1.70 m (5 ft 7 in)
- Position: Midfielder

Team information
- Current team: Tranmere Rovers
- Number: 8

Youth career
- –2008: Everton

Senior career*
Years	Team	Apps	(Gls)
2008–2010	Southport		
2010–2011	Warrington Town		
2011–2015	The New Saints	64	(18)
2015	→ Wrexham (loan)	14	(0)
2015–2018	AFC Fylde	95	(17)
2018–2020	Accrington Stanley	68	(3)
2020–2021	Fleetwood Town	29	(3)
2021–2024	Bristol Rovers	104	(5)
2024–	Tranmere Rovers	63	(4)
- * Club domestic league appearances and goals as of 12:10, 2 August 2026 (UTC)

Samuel Joseph Finley (born 4 August 1992) is an English professional footballer who plays as a midfielder for EFL League Two club Tranmere Rovers.

== Career ==
Finley was first picked up as a youth by Everton, where he stayed until he was 16.

Finley would then play for non-league clubs Southport and Warrington, before being released by the latter. Following this, Finley was signed by Welsh Premier League side The New Saints.

He would spend 5 years at the Welsh club, making appearances in Champions League qualifying against Legia Warsaw and Anderlecht during his time there. He also won the Welsh Premier League with TNS four years in a row, along with 2 Welsh Cup victories and 1 Welsh League Cup.

In February 2015, he was loaned to Conference side Wrexham.

In August 2015, Finley would move to AFC Fylde on a free transfer. He stayed at the club for 3 years, eventually becoming club captain.

On 29 June 2018, Finley signed a 2-year contract with League One side Accrington Stanley. He made his debut for the club on his 26th birthday, coming off of the bench in a 0–2 home defeat to Gillingham.

In April 2020, Finley picked up an 8 match ban as a result of an investigation around a comment made to Rochdale's former Irish international Paul McShane, during a League One fixture on New Year's Day 2020, regarding McShane's nationality.

On 15 September 2020, Finley left Accrington Stanley by mutual consent and became a free agent. His previous 8 match ban was cited as a reason for the decision.

=== Fleetwood Town ===
On 18 September 2020, Finley joined Fleetwood Town on a one-year deal. He made his debut on 20 October, coming on as a substitute in the 84th minute of a 1–0 away defeat against Accrington, the club he had been released from just a month earlier. He scored his first goal for Fleetwood in a 5–1 win against Plymouth Argyle on 21 November 2020. At the end of the season, it was announced that Finley's contract would not be being renewed by the club and he would be one of nine players to be leaving the club.

=== Bristol Rovers ===
On 26 May 2021, Finley agreed to join League Two side Bristol Rovers on a two-year contract active from 1 July, linking back up with former-Fleetwood manager Joey Barton. Having missed all of pre-season after contracting COVID-19 as well as picking up a muscle injury, Finley missed Rovers' first two matches of the season and made his debut on 14 August in a 2–0 home defeat to Stevenage. Finley scored his first goal for the club the following week when he curled a consolation goal into the top corner from 25 yards as Rovers lost 4–1 at Exeter City. Finley took the captain's armband for the final match of the season, a 7–0 win over Scunthorpe United that saw Rovers move into the final automatic promotion place on goals scored.

On 20 September 2022, Finley signed a new contract with the club that would see his stay extended until the summer of 2024.

Following the departure of Paul Coutts, Finley was named club captain prior to the commencement of the 2023–24 season. On 19 September 2023, he scored his first goal since April 2022 in a 3–1 EFL Trophy defeat to West Ham United U21s. In April 2024, following Rovers' penultimate match of the season, Finley announced that he would be departing the club upon the expiration of his contract at the end of the season.

=== Tranmere Rovers ===
On 4 June 2024, Finley agreed to join League Two side Tranmere Rovers on a two-year contract. On 25 April 2025, he was suspended for 13 games by the Football Association for homophobic abuse directed to Walsall striker Jamille Matt.

On 12 May 2026, Tranmere announced the player would stay with the club until the end of the 2026–27 season.

== Career statistics ==
As of match played 1 August 2026

Appearances and goals by club, season and competition
Club	Season	League			National cup (Note: Includes Welsh Cup, FA Cup)		League cup (Note: Includes Welsh League Cup, EFL Cup)		Europe		Other		Total	
Club	Season	Division	Apps	Goals	Apps	Goals	Apps	Goals	Apps	Goals	Apps	Goals	Apps	Goals
The New Saints	2010–11	Welsh Premier League	0	0	0	0	0	0	0	0	0	0	0	0
The New Saints	2011–12	Welsh Premier League	5	1	0	0	4	2	0	0	0	0	9	3
The New Saints	2012–13	Welsh Premier League	23	3	3	2	3	0	2 (Note: Appearances in UEFA Champions League)	0	0	0	31	5
The New Saints	2013–14	Welsh Premier League	26	10	3	1	0	0	2	0	0	0	31	11
The New Saints	2014–15	Welsh Premier League	10	4	0	0	1	0	2	0	0	0	13	4
The New Saints	2015–16	Welsh Premier League	0	0	0	0	0	0	4	0	0	0	4	0
The New Saints	Total		64	18	6	3	8	2	10	0	0	0	88	23
Wrexham (loan)	2014–15	Football Conference	14	0	0	0	0	0	—		0	0	14	0
AFC Fylde	2015–16	National League North	38	8	1	0	0	0	—		4 (Note: Appearances in FA Trophy)	0	43	8
AFC Fylde	2016–17	National League North	23	3	0	0	0	0	—		0	0	23	3
AFC Fylde	2017–18	National League	33	6	4	1	0	0	—		1 (Note: Appearance in National League play-offs)	0	38	7
AFC Fylde	Total		94	17	5	1	0	0	0	0	5	0	104	18
Accrington Stanley	2018–19	League One	37	1	3	0	1	1	—		3 (Note: Appearance(s) in EFL Trophy)	1	44	3
Accrington Stanley	2019–20	League One	31	2	1	0	1	0	—		5	1	38	3
Accrington Stanley	Total		68	3	4	0	2	1	0	0	8	2	82	6
Fleetwood Town	2020–21	League One	29	3	1	0	0	0	—		1	0	29	3
Bristol Rovers	2021–22	League Two	36	5	3	1	0	0	—		1	0	40	6
Bristol Rovers	2022–23	League One	38	0	2	0	1	0	—		2	0	43	0
Bristol Rovers	2023–24	League One	30	0	3	0	1	0	—		4	1	38	1
Bristol Rovers	Total		104	5	8	1	2	0	0	0	7	1	121	7
Tranmere Rovers	2024–25	League Two	33	2	1	0	0	0	—		3	0	37	2
Tranmere Rovers	2025–26	League Two	30	2	1	0	0	0	—		2	0	33	2
Tranmere Rovers	2026–27	League Two	0	0	0	0	1	0	—		0	0	1	0
Tranmere Rovers	Total		63	4	2	0	1	0	0	0	5	0	71	4
Total			436	50	26	5	13	3	10	0	26	3	510	61

== Honours ==
The New Saints

- Welsh Premier League: 2011–12, 2012–13, 2013–14, 2014–15
- Welsh Cup: 2012, 2014
- Welsh League Cup: 2015

AFC Fylde

- National League North: 2016–17

Bristol Rovers

- EFL League Two third-place promotion: 2021–22
