= 2018–19 Fleetwood Town F.C. season =

Fleetwood Town
2018–19 season
- Chairman: Andy Pilley
- Head Coach: Joey Barton
- Stadium: Highbury Stadium
- League One: 11th
- FA Cup: Third round
- EFL Cup: Second round (Vs. Leicester City)
- EFL Trophy: Group stage
- Top goalscorer: League: Paddy Madden (15 goals); All: Paddy Madden (19 goals)
- Highest home attendance: League/All: 5,035 v. Blackpool (27 October 2018)
- Lowest home attendance: League: 2,304 v. Wycombe Wanderers (2 October 2018); All: 504 v. Leicester City U21 (11 Sep 2018, EFL Trophy Grp Stage)
- Average home league attendance: 3,165
- Biggest win: 5–0 v. Scunthorpe United (22 August 2018)
- Biggest defeat: 0–4 v. Leicester City (28 August 2018, EFL Cup R2)
Home colours	Away colours

The 2018–19 season was Fleetwood Town's 111th season in their history and fifth consecutive season in League One. Along with League One, the club also participated in the FA Cup, EFL Cup and EFL Trophy.

The season covers the period from 1 July 2018 to 30 June 2019.

== Transfers ==
=== Transfers in ===
Date from	Position	Nationality	Name	From	Fee	Ref.
1 July 2018	DF	(Northern Ireland)	Dylan Boyle	(Northern Ireland) Ridgeway Rovers	Undisclosed	
1 July 2018	LB	(England)	Eddie Clarke	Tranmere Rovers	Free transfer	
1 July 2018	MF	(England)	Jay Matete	Reading	Free transfer	
1 July 2018	CB	(Wales)	Craig Morgan	Wigan Athletic	Free transfer	
20 July 2018	CF	(England)	Chris Long	Burnley	Free transfer	
20 July 2018	CM	(England)	James Wallace	Tranmere Rovers	Free transfer	
30 July 2018	CM	(England)	Dean Marney	Burnley	Free transfer	
2 August 2018	GK	(England)	Paul Jones	Norwich City	Free transfer	
4 September 2018	MF	(Northern Ireland)	Barry Baggley	(Northern Ireland) Glentoran	Undisclosed	
21 September 2018	MF	(Scotland)	Ross Wallace	Sheffield Wednesday	Free transfer	
23 September 2018	RB	(England)	Ryan Taylor	(India) ATK	Free transfer	
16 January 2019	FW	(England)	Harvey Saunders	Darlington	Undisclosed	
3 February 2019	RB	(Wales)	Macaulay Southam-Hales	(Wales) Barry Town United	Undisclosed	
20 March 2019	CF	(England)	Michael Fowler	Burnley	Undisclosed	

=== Transfers out ===
Date from	Position	Nationality	Name	To	Fee	Ref.
1 July 2018	DM	(United States)	Sebastien Des Pres	(United States) Orange County	Released	
1 July 2018	DM	(England)	George Glendon	Carlisle United	Released	
1 July 2018	LB	(England)	Luke Higham	Free agent	Released	
1 July 2018	AM	(Netherlands)	Ricardo Kip	(Netherlands) Almere City	Released	
1 July 2018	GK	(England)	Chris Neal	Salford City	Released	
1 July 2018	RB	(France)	Victor Nirennold	(Slovakia) Senica	Released	
1 July 2018	CB	(England)	Nathan Pond	Salford City	Free transfer	
1 July 2018	RB	(Germany)	Markus Schwabl	(Germany) Unterhaching	Released	
18 July 2018	DM	(France)	Toumani Diagouraga	Swindon Town	Undisclosed	
19 July 2018	CF	(England)	Alex Reid	Stevenage	Undisclosed	
29 August 2018	SS	(Brazil)	Joao Morelli	(Brazil) Ituano	Undisclosed	
2 January 2019	CM	(England)	Bobby Grant	(Wales) Wrexham	Undisclosed	
8 January 2019	CF	(England)	Chris Long	Blackpool	Mutual consent	
17 January 2019	CB	(Republic of Ireland)	Cian Bolger	Lincoln City	Undisclosed	
17 January 2019	RW	(England)	Michael Donohue	FC United of Manchester	Free transfer	
28 January 2019	GK	(England)	Matt Urwin	Chorley	Free transfer	

=== Loans in ===
Start date	Position	Nationality	Name	From	End date	Ref.
1 July 2018	RB	(England)	Lewie Coyle	Leeds United	31 May 2019	
1 July 2018	CM	(Scotland)	Jason Holt	(Scotland) Rangers	31 May 2019	
1 July 2018	LB	(England)	Tommy Spurr	Preston North End	3 January 2019	
20 July 2018	CF	(Wales)	Ched Evans	Sheffield United	31 May 2019	
20 August 2018	LB	(England)	James Husband	Norwich City	31 May 2019	
30 January 2019	CB	(Scotland)	Harry Souttar	Stoke City	31 May 2019	

=== Loans out ===
Start date	Position	Nationality	Name	To	End date	Ref.
6 July 2018	ST	(Wales)	Dan Mooney	Chester	2 January 2019	
1 August 2018	GK	(England)	Billy Crellin	FC United of Manchester	20 September 2018	
3 August 2018	GK	(England)	Matt Urwin	Chorley	27 January 2019	
17 August 2018	CF	(England)	Ashley Nadesan	Carlisle United	9 January 2019	
31 August 2018	LB	(England)	Joe Maguire	Crawley Town	31 May 2019	
31 August 2018	CM	(England)	Jack Sowerby	Carlisle United	31 January 2019	
1 September 2018	RW	(England)	Michael Donohue	FC United of Manchester	1 January 2019	
25 November 2018	CM	(England)	Bobby Grant	Wrexham	1 January 2019	
21 December 2018	DF	(England)	Lewis Baines	Chorley	January 2019	
21 December 2018	CF	(England)	Mamadou Djabi	Colne	January 2019	
7 January 2019	CM	(England)	Kyle Dempsey	Peterborough United	31 May 2019	
16 January 2019	FW	(England)	Harvey Saunders	Darlington	31 May 2019	
25 January 2019	DF	(England)	Lewis Baines	Stockport County	31 May 2019	
28 January 2019	RB	(Wales)	Gethin Jones	Mansfield Town	31 May 2019	
28 January 2019	CF	(England)	Conor McAleny	(Scotland) Kilmarnock	31 May 2019	
28 March 2019	CF	(England)	Michael Fowler	Guiseley	31 May 2019	

== Competitions ==
=== Friendlies ===
Fleetwood Town announced a pre-season friendlies against Salford City, STK Fluminense Šamorín, Tranmere Rovers, Morecambe and Chorley.

6 July 2018 Friendly	Salford City	0–4	Fleetwood Town	Salford
19:30 BST		Report	Madden 35'; McAleny 51'; Nadesan 61'; Biggins 67'	Stadium: Peninsula

10 July 2018 Friendly	Fleetwood Town	4–1	STK Fluminense Šamorín	Telki, Hungary
16:30 BST	Spurr 12'; Burns 59'; Garner 84'; Nadesan 85'	Report	Samorin 27'	Stadium: Telki Sports Park

21 July 2018 Friendly	Tranmere Rovers	0–2	Fleetwood Town	Birkenhead
15:00 BST		Report	Dempsey 23'; Evans 84'	Stadium: Prenton Park

28 July 2018 Friendly	Morecambe	1–3	Fleetwood Town	Morecambe
15:00 BST	Fleming 53'	Report	McAleny 22'; Burns 42'; Grant 66'	Stadium: Globe Arena

30 July 2018 Friendly	Chorley	1–2	Fleetwood Town	Chorley
19:30 BST	Wilson 8'	Report	Hunter 41', 43'	Stadium: Victory Park

=== League One ===
==== League table ====
Pos	Team	Pld	W	D	L	GF	GA	GD	Pts
9	Burton Albion	46	17	12	17	66	57	+9	63
10	Blackpool	46	15	17	14	50	52	−2	62
11	Fleetwood Town	46	16	13	17	58	52	+6	61
12	Oxford United	46	15	15	16	58	64	−6	60
13	Gillingham	46	15	10	21	61	72	−11	55

Source: EFL Official Website
Rules for classification: 1) Points; 2) Goal difference; 3) Number of goals scored; 4) Head-to-head results

==== Results summary ====
Overall								Home						Away					
Pld	W	D	L	GF	GA	GD	Pts	W	D	L	GF	GA	GD	W	D	L	GF	GA	GD
46	16	13	17	58	52	+6	61	9	9	5	33	27	+6	7	4	12	25	25	0

Last updated: 4 May 2019.
Source: BBC

==== Results by matchday ====
Matchday	1	2	3	4	5	6	7	8	9	10	11	12	13	14	15	16	17	18	19	20	21	22	23	24	25	26	27	28	29	30	31	32	33	34	35	36	37	38	39	40	41	42	43	44	45	46
Ground	H	A	H	A	A	H	A	H	A	H	H	A	H	A	A	H	A	H	A	H	A	H	A	H	H	A	H	A	A	H	H	A	H	A	H	A	A	H	A	H	A	H	A	H	H	A
Result	L	W	D	W	D	W	D	D	L	L	D	W	W	L	L	W	L	D	L	W	L	W	L	W	L	D	D	D	W	L	W	W	L	W	D	L	L	W	W	D	L	D	L	D	W	L
Position	20	10	9	6	6	6	6	8	10	11	13	10	8	11	13	10	11	12	13	12	13	10	12	10	11	11	10	12	8	10	10	9	10	8	9	10	10	10	10	11	11	11	12	12	11	11

Updated to match(es) played on 4 May 2019. Source: Statto.com
A = Away; H = Home; W = Win; D = Draw; L = Loss

==== Matches ====
On 21 June 2018, the League One fixtures for the forthcoming season were announced.

4 August 2018 1	Fleetwood Town	0–1	AFC Wimbledon	Fleetwood
15:00 BST		Report	Pigott 60'	Stadium: Highbury Stadium; Attendance: 3,236; Referee: Mark Heywood

11 August 2018 2	Oxford United	0–2	Fleetwood Town	Oxford
15:00 BST		Report	Evans 34'; Madden 89' (pen.)	Stadium: Kassam Stadium; Attendance: 6,689; Referee: Ollie Yates

18 August 2018 3	Fleetwood Town	2–2	Rochdale	Fleetwood
15:00 BST	McNulty 29' (o.g.); Evans 56'	Report	Henderson 50' (pen.), 90+5'	Stadium: Highbury Stadium; Attendance: 3,565; Referee: Dean Whitestone

22 August 2018 4	Scunthorpe United	0–5	Fleetwood Town	Scunthorpe
19:45 BST		Report	Evans 16', 18'; Burns 21', 29'; Hunter 56'	Stadium: Glanford Park; Attendance: 3,465; Referee: Carl Boyeson

25 August 2018 5	Charlton Athletic	0–0	Fleetwood Town	Charlton
15:00 BST		Report		Stadium: The Valley; Attendance: 8,810; Referee: Antony Coggins

1 September 2018 6	Fleetwood Town	2–1	Bradford City	Fleetwood
15:00 BST	Evans 12'; Burns (red card) 42'; Hunter 48'	Report	Doyle 23' (pen.)	Stadium: Highbury Stadium; Attendance: 3,347; Referee: Andy Haines

8 September 2018 7	Sunderland	1–1	Fleetwood Town	Sunderland
15:00 BST	Maja 38'	Report	Madden 9'	Stadium: Stadium of Light; Attendance: 29,367; Referee: Darren Drysdale

15 September 2018 8	Fleetwood Town	1–1	Accrington Stanley	Fleetwood
15:00 BST	Bolger 37'	Report	McConville 69'	Stadium: Highbury Stadium; Attendance: 3,355; Referee: Michael Salisbury

22 September 2018 9	Southend United	1–0	Fleetwood Town	Southend-on-Sea
15:00 BST	Cox 53'	Report	Wallace (red card) 90+5'	Stadium: Roots Hall; Attendance: 5,712; Referee: Charles Breakspear

29 September 2018 10	Fleetwood Town	1–3	Barnsley	Fleetwood
15:00 BST	Biggins 19'	Report	Brown 32'; Moore 41'; Thiam 90+3'	Stadium: Highbury Stadium; Attendance: 3,756; Referee: Martin Coy

2 October 2018 11	Fleetwood Town	1–1	Wycombe Wanderers	Fleetwood
19:45 BST	Madden 37'	Report	Akinfenwa 56'	Stadium: Highbury Stadium; Attendance: 2,304; Referee: Scott Oldham

6 October 2018 12	Doncaster Rovers	0–4	Fleetwood Town	Doncaster
15:00 BST	Wright (yellow card) 43'; Coppinger (yellow card) 61'	Report	Evans 4' (pen.), (yellow card) 45'; Husband (yellow card) 9'; Wallace 34', (yellow card) 44'; Eastham 45+5'; Hunter 49'; Taylor (yellow card) 64'	Stadium: Keepmoat Stadium; Attendance: 6,846; Referee: John Busby

13 October 2018 13	Fleetwood Town	2–1	Shrewsbury Town	Fleetwood
15:00 BST	Madden 19'; Burns 28'	Report	Norburn (yellow card) 3'; Laurent 57'; Waterfall (yellow card) 72'	Stadium: Highbury Stadium; Attendance: 2,983; Referee: Thomas Bramall

20 October 2018 14	Portsmouth	1–0	Fleetwood Town	Milton
15:00 BST	Hawkins 50'; Naylor (yellow card) 66'	Report	Coyle (yellow card) 29'; Wallace (yellow card) 64'; Sheron (yellow card) 78', (yellow card) 84' (red card)	Stadium: Fratton Park; Attendance: 18,046; Referee: Lee Swabey

23 October 2018 15	Peterborough United	1–0	Fleetwood Town	Peterborough
19:45 BST	Bennett 52'	Report		Stadium: London Road Stadium; Attendance: 5,347; Referee: Ollie Yates

27 October 2018 16	Fleetwood Town	3–2	Blackpool	Fleetwood
15:00 BST	Burns 4'; Wallace 11'; Sheron (yellow card) 49'; Madden 57'; Eastham (yellow card) 90+4'	Report	Thompson 34'; Delfouneso 59'; Bola (yellow card) 68'; Turton (yellow card) 69'; Gnanduillet (red card) 90+4'	Stadium: Highbury Stadium; Attendance: 5,035; Referee: John Brooks

3 November 2018 17	Gillingham	3–0	Fleetwood Town	Gillingham
15:00 GMT	Hanlan 11'; Eaves 18', 55', (yellow card) 88'; Byrne (yellow card) 30'	Report	Coyle (yellow card) 76'	Stadium: Priestfield Stadium; Referee: Charles Breakspear

17 November 2018 18	Fleetwood Town	0–0	Walsall	Fleetwood
12:00 GMT		Report	Martin (yellow card) 73'	Stadium: Highbury Stadium; Attendance: 3,090; Referee: Ross Joyce

24 November 2018 19	Plymouth Argyle	2–1	Fleetwood Town	Plymouth
15:00 GMT	Ladapo 72', 81'	Report	Madden 84'	Stadium: Home Park; Attendance: 8,301; Referee: Charles Breakspear

27 November 2018 20	Fleetwood Town	3–0	Coventry City	Fleetwood
19:45 GMT	Marney 53'; Burns 71'; Evans 73'	Report		Stadium: Highbury Stadium; Attendance: 2,570; Referee: Martin Coy

8 December 2018 21	Luton Town	2–0	Fleetwood Town	Luton
15:00 GMT	Cornick 11'; Morgan 80' (o.g.)	Report		Stadium: Kenilworth Road; Attendance: 8,528; Referee: Nick Kinseley

15 December 2018 22	Fleetwood Town	1–0	Burton Albion	Fleetwood
15:00 GMT	Evans 51' (pen.)	Report		Stadium: Highbury Stadium; Attendance: 2,563; Referee: Anthony Backhouse

22 December 2018 23	Bristol Rovers	2–1	Fleetwood Town	Horfield, Bristol
15:00 GMT	O. Clarke (yellow card) 23'; Reilly 36'; Lines (yellow card) 90+3'; J. Clarke 90+4', (yellow card) 90+6'	Report	Hunter 28', (yellow card) 41'; Evans (yellow card) 43' (yellow-red card) 55'; Holt (yellow card) 46'; Madden (yellow card) 60'; Marney (yellow card) 64'; Wallace (yellow card) 80'; Coyle (yellow card) 90+8'	Stadium: Memorial Stadium; Attendance: 7,159; Referee: rett Huxtable

26 December 2018 24	Fleetwood Town	3–0	Doncaster Rovers	Fleetwood
15:00 GMT	Madden 11', 90+1'; Sheron (yellow card) 14'; Hunter 48'; Coyle (yellow card) 61'	Report	Butler (yellow card) 55'; Andrew (yellow card) 63'; Rowe (yellow card) 89'	Stadium: Highbury Stadium; Attendance: 2,908; Referee: Peter Wright

29 December 2018 25	Fleetwood Town	2–5	Portsmouth	Fleetwood
15:00 GMT	Marney (yellow card) 33' (yellow-red card) 51'; Madden 39' (yellow card) 41'; Evans 43' (pen.)	Report	Thompson 26'; Clarke (yellow card) 43'; Pitman 57' (pen.); Walkes 58'; Lowe 81', 84'	Stadium: Highbury Stadium; Attendance: 3,494; Referee: Matt Donohue

1 January 2019 26	Shrewsbury Town	0–0	Fleetwood Town	Shrewsbury
15:00 GMT	Bolton (yellow card) 30'; Docherty (yellow card) 71'; Waterfall (yellow card) 80'; Haynes (yellow card) 90+4'	Report	R. Wallace (yellow card) 39'; J. Wallace (yellow card) 66'	Stadium: New Meadow; Attendance: 5,919; Referee: Alan Young

12 January 2019 27	Fleetwood Town	2–2	Oxford United	Fleetwood
15:00 GMT	Burns 8'; Madden 26'; Wallace (yellow card) 73'	Report	Hanson (yellow card) 19'; Henry 52'; Mackie 64' (yellow card) 78'	Stadium: Highbury Stadium; Attendance: 2,789; Referee: Andy Haines

19 January 2019 28	Rochdale	1–1	Fleetwood Town	Rochdale
15:00 GMT	Hamilton (yellow card) 42'; Henderson 75'; Camps (yellow card) 80'	Report	Madden 36'; Coyle (red card) 54'; Cairns (yellow card) 82'	Stadium: Spotland Stadium; Attendance: 2,713; Referee: Geoff Eltringham

22 January 2019 29	AFC Wimbledon	0–3	Fleetwood Town	Kingston upon Thames
19:45 GMT	Pinnock (yellow card) 63'	Report	Evans 19', 30' (yellow card) 89'; Hunter 83'	Stadium: Kingsmeadow; Attendance: 3,499; Referee: Charles Breakspear

26 January 2019 30	Fleetwood Town	0–1	Scunthorpe United	Fleetwood
15:00 GMT	Wallace (yellow card) 71'; Hunter (yellow card) 90+1'	Report	Eastham 76' (o.g.)	Stadium: Highbury Stadium; Attendance: 2,637; Referee: Seb Stockbridge

2 February 2019 31	Fleetwood Town	1–0	Charlton Athletic	Fleetwood
15:00 GMT	J. Wallace (yellow card) 7'; R. Wallace (yellow card) 36'; Evans 68'	Report	Bauer (yellow card) 66' (yellow-red card) 87'; Bielik (yellow card) 75'; Sarr (yellow card) 78'	Stadium: Highbury Stadium; Attendance: 2,742; Referee: Tony Harrington

9 February 2019 32	Bradford City	0–1	Fleetwood Town	Bradford
15:00 GMT	Knight-Percival (yellow card) 41'; Colville (yellow card) 84'	Report	Madden 9'; Hunter (yellow card) 17'; Sheron (yellow card) 52'; Evans (yellow card) 69'; Husband (yellow card) 82'; Coyle (yellow card) 90+2'	Stadium: Valley Parade; Attendance: 15,365; Referee: Ollie Yates

16 February 2019 33	Fleetwood Town	1–2	Luton Town	Fleetwood
15:00 GMT	Wallace (yellow card) 14'; Sowerby (yellow card) 27'; Burns (yellow card) 36'; Holt (yellow card) 40'; Madden 90+2'	Report	McCormack (yellow card) 37'; Moncur 41' (yellow card) 41'; Ruddock Mpanzu 49'; Collins (yellow card) 75'	Stadium: Highbury Stadium; Attendance: 3,651; Referee: Peter Bankes

23 February 2019 34	Burton Albion	0–1	Fleetwood Town	Burton upon Trent
15:00 GMT		Report	Madden (yellow card) 45'; Nadesan 57'; Holt (yellow card) 69'; Eastham (yellow card) 90+4'; Husband (yellow card) 90+6'	Stadium: Pirelli Stadium; Attendance: 2,634; Referee: Michael Salisbury

2 March 2019 35	Fleetwood Town	1–1	Gillingham	Fleetwood
15:00 GMT	Evans (yellow card) 45+2'; Husband 90+1'; Coyle (yellow card) 90+3'	Report	Parrett (yellow card) 45+2'; Lopes (yellow card) 52'; Eaves 83'	Stadium: Highbury Stadium; Attendance: 3,019; Referee: Neil Hair

9 March 2019 36	Walsall	2–0	Fleetwood Town	Walsall
15:00 GMT	Ferrier 54'; Scarr 67'; Devlin (yellow card) 74'	Report		Stadium: Bescot Stadium; Attendance: 4,986; Referee: Eddie Ilderton

12 March 2019 37	Coventry City	2–1	Fleetwood Town	Coventry
19:45 GMT	Bakayoko 6'; Bayliss (yellow card) 12'; Hiwula 42'; Williams (yellow card) 79'	Report	Nadesan (yellow card) 28'; Evans 33'	Stadium: Ricoh Arena; Attendance: 9,220; Referee: Carl Boyeson

16 March 2019 38	Fleetwood Town	2–0	Plymouth Argyle	Fleetwood
15:00 GMT	Holt (yellow card) 52' (goal) 77'; Hunter 80'	Report		Stadium: Highbury Stadium; Attendance: 2,711; Referee: John Busby

30 March 2019 39	Accrington Stanley	0–1	Fleetwood Town	Accrington
15:00 GMT	Donacien (yellow card) 28'; McConville (yellow card) 80'	Report	Rydel (yellow card) 30'; Sheron (yellow card) 45'; Souttar 50'; Evans (yellow card) 89'	Stadium: Crown Ground; Attendance: 2,485; Referee: Anthony Backhouse

6 April 2019 40	Fleetwood Town	2–2	Southend United	Fleetwood
15:00 BST	Souttar (yellow card) 38'; Burns (yellow card) 55'; Evans 59', 84' (pen.); Hunter (yellow card) 80'	Report	Bunn 21'; Hyam (yellow card) 78' (goal) 80'; White (yellow card) 90+3'	Stadium: Highbury Stadium; Attendance: 2,761; Referee: Peter Wright

13 April 2019 41	Barnsley	4–2	Fleetwood Town	Barnsley
15:00 BST	Bähre 21'; Woodrow 34'; McGeehan (yellow card) 35' (goal) 70'; Pinillos (yellow card) 42'; Brown 79'	Report	Wallace (yellow card) 58'; Coyle (yellow card) 58'; Evans 64'; Souttar (red card) 65'; Burns 77'	Stadium: Oakwell; Attendance: 11,243; Referee: Sebastian Stockbridge

19 April 2019 42	Fleetwood Town	1–1	Peterborough United	Fleetwood
15:00 BST	Husband (yellow card) 47'; Eastham (yellow card) 87'; Biggins (yellow card) 90+2'; Hunter 90+4' (yellow card) 90+5'	Report	Maddison (penalty missed) 20' 64'; Dembélé (yellow card) 66'	Stadium: Highbury Stadium; Attendance: 2,774; Referee: Tom Nield

22 April 2019 43	Blackpool	2–1	Fleetwood Town	Blackpool
15:00 BST	Spearing 31' (pen.); Thompson (yellow card) 57'; Delfouneso 90+4'	Report	Evans 37'; Eastham (yellow card) 67'; Sheron (red card) 72'; Hill (yellow card) 87'; Sowerby (yellow card) 90+6'	Stadium: Bloomfield Road; Attendance: 11,713; Referee: Darren Bond

27 April 2019 44	Fleetwood Town	0–0	Bristol Rovers	Fleetwood
15:00 BST	Evans (yellow card) 81'; Madden (yellow card) 81'	Report	Partington (yellow card) 45+1'; Ogogo (yellow card) 69'; Clarke (yellow card) 77'; Lockyer (yellow card) 81'; Bonham (yellow card) 81'; Upson (yellow card) 87'	Stadium: Highbury Stadium; Attendance: 3,488; Referee: Jarred Gillett

30 April 2019 45	Fleetwood Town	2–1	Sunderland	Fleetwood
19:45 BST	Burns (yellow card) 71'; Madden 73'; Sowerby (yellow card) 83'; Hunter (yellow card) 83'; Wallace (yellow card) 90+2'; Eastham 90+5'	Report	Cattermole 29'	Stadium: Highbury Stadium; Attendance: 4,011; Referee: Robert Jones

4 May 2019 46	Wycombe Wanderers	1–0	Fleetwood Town	High Wycombe
17:30 BST	Jacobson 75'	Report	Sowerby (yellow card) 25'; Eastham (yellow card) 31'; Cairns (yellow card) 76'	Stadium: Adams Park; Attendance: 5,575; Referee: Lee Swabey

=== FA Cup ===
The first round draw was made live on BBC by Dennis Wise and Dion Dublin on 22 October. The draw for the second round was made live on BBC and BT by Mark Schwarzer and Glenn Murray on 12 November. The third round draw was made live on BBC by Ruud Gullit and Paul Ince from Stamford Bridge on 3 December 2018.

11 November 2018 First round	Alfreton Town	1–4	Fleetwood Town	Alfreton
12:45 GMT	Sinnott 70'	Report	Madden 13', 60' (pen.); Hunter 20'; Garner 90+2'	Stadium: North Street; Referee: Christopher Sarginson

3 December 2018 Second round	Guiseley	1–2	Fleetwood Town	Guiseley
20:00 GMT	Purver 33'	Report	Madden 28'; Burns 31'	Stadium: Nethermoor Park; Attendance: 2,324; Referee: John Busby

5 January 2019 Third round	Fleetwood Town	2–3	AFC Wimbledon	Fleetwood
15:00 GMT	Madden 70'; Evans 72' (pen.); Morgan (yellow card) 89'	Report	Kalambayi (yellow card) 11'; Barcham 16'; Appiah (yellow card) 29' (goal) 90'; Hartigan 55'; Wordsworth (yellow card) 71'	Stadium: Highbury Stadium; Attendance: 2,131; Referee: Ross Joyce

=== EFL Cup ===
On 15 June 2018, the draw for the first round was made in Vietnam. The second round draw was made from the Stadium of Light on 16 August.

14 August 2018 First round	Crewe Alexandra	1–1 (3–4 p)	Fleetwood Town	Crewe
19:45 BST	Wintle 32'	Report	Holt 52'	Stadium: Gresty Road; Attendance: 1,783; Referee: Trevor Kettle
	Penalties
	Jones (penalty missed); Nicholls (penalty scored); Reilly (penalty scored); Pickering (penalty scored); Ng (penalty missed)		Madden (penalty scored); Long (penalty scored); Holt (penalty scored); Biggins (penalty missed); Hunter (penalty scored)

28 August 2018 Second round	Leicester City	4–0	Fleetwood Town	Leicester
19:45 BST	Fuchs 8'; Iborra 39'; Iheanacho 46'; Ghezzal 71'	Report		Stadium: King Power Stadium; Attendance: 10,671; Referee: Lee Mason

=== EFL Trophy ===
On 13 July 2018, the initial group stage draw bar the U21 invited clubs was announced.

Pos	Lge	Team	Pld	W	PW	PL	L	GF	GA	GD	Pts	Qualification
1	L1	Rochdale	3	2	0	1	0	6	3	+3	7	Round 2
2	L2	Bury	3	2	0	0	1	6	4	+2	6	Round 2
3	ACA	Leicester City U21	3	0	2	0	1	5	6	−1	4	
4	L1	Fleetwood Town	3	0	0	1	2	3	7	−4	1	

Source: EFL.com

11 September 2018 Group stages	Fleetwood Town	2–2 (6–7 p)	Leicester City U21	Fleetwood
19:45 BST	Long 34'; McAleny 47'; Bolger (red card) 61'	Report	Loft 81', 90+6'	Stadium: Highbury Stadium; Attendance: 504
	Penalties
	McAleny (penalty scored); Jones (penalty scored); Garner (penalty scored); Biggins (penalty scored); Clarke (penalty missed); Spurr (penalty scored); Sheron (penalty scored); Dempsey (penalty missed)		Diabaté (penalty scored); Choudhury (penalty scored); Wright (penalty scored); Dewsbury-Hall (penalty scored); Knight (penalty missed); Johnson (penalty scored); Martis (penalty scored); Loft (penalty scored)

9 October 2018 Group stages	Fleetwood Town	0–2	Rochdale	Fleetwood
19:45 BST		Report	Williams 16'; Cannon 47'	Stadium: Highbury Stadium; Attendance: 669

13 November 2018 Group stages	Bury	3–1	Fleetwood Town	Bury
19:45 GMT	Telford 22' (pen.); Dagnall 32'; Adams 37'	Report	Dempsey 14'	Stadium: Gigg Lane; Attendance: 554
