= Lewis Baines =

English footballer

Personal information
- Full name: Lewis Robert George Baines
- Date of birth: 10 October 1998 (age 28)
- Place of birth: Brighton, England
- Position: Defender

Team information
- Current team: Morecambe
- Number: 6

Youth career
- –2017: Fleetwood Town

Senior career*
Years	Team	Apps	(Gls)
2017–2019	Fleetwood Town	0	(0)
2017	→ Bamber Bridge (loan)	13	(0)
2018	→ Ashton United (loan)	15	(1)
2018	→ Ashton United (loan)	6	(0)
2018–2019	→ Chorley (loan)	5	(0)
2019	→ Stockport County (loan)	5	(0)
2019–2022	Chorley	92	(2)
2022–2026	Altrincham	128	(5)
2026	→ Solihull Moors (loan)	11	(1)
2026–	Morecambe	9	(0)

International career
2022	England C	1	(0)
- * Club domestic league appearances and goals as of 07:57, 13 September 2026 (UTC)

Lewis Robert George Baines (born 10 October 1998) is an English professional footballer who plays as a defender for National League club Altrincham.

== Career ==
Baines turned professional with Fleetwood Town in the summer of 2017, and spent loan spells with Bamber Bridge and Ashton United before signing a new contract in July 2018. He made his senior debut on 13 November 2018 in the EFL Trophy. He moved on loan to Chorley in December 2018, and to Stockport County in January 2019.

On 25 July 2019, Baines completed a permanent deal to join newly promoted National League side Chorley.

On 30 May 2022, Baines returned to the National League to join Altrincham for an undisclosed fee. He moved on loan to Solihull Moors in February 2026.

He signed for Morecambe in June 2026.

== International career ==
On 28 March 2022, he was called-up to the England C squad for the friendly against Wales C in Caernarfon. He came on for the final fifteen minutes as a substitute in the 4–0 defeat.

== Career statistics ==
As of end of 2021–22 season

Appearances and goals by club, season and competition
Club	Season	League			FA Cup		EFL Cup		Other		Total	
Club	Season	Division	Apps	Goals	Apps	Goals	Apps	Goals	Apps	Goals	Apps	Goals
Fleetwood Town	2017–18	League One	0	0	0	0	0	0	0	0	0	0
Fleetwood Town	2018–19	League One	0	0	—		0	0	1 (Note: Appearance(s) in the EFL Trophy)	0	1	0
Fleetwood Town	Total		0	0	0	0	0	0	1	0	1	0
Bamber Bridge (loan)	2017–18	NPL Division One North	13	0	—		—		3 (Note: Two appearances in the FA Trophy, one appearance in the NPL League Challenge Cup)	0	16	0
Ashton United (loan)	2017–18	NPL Premier Division	15	1	—		—		2 (Note: Appearance(s) in the NPL Premier Division play-offs)	0	17	1
Ashton United (loan)	2018–19	National League North	6	0	2	0	—		—		8	0
Ashton United (loan)	Total		21	1	2	0	—		2	0	25	1
Chorley (loan)	2018–19	National League North	5	0	—		—		—		5	0
Stockport County (loan)	2018–19	National League North	5	0	—		—		2 (Note: Appearance(s) in the FA Trophy)	0	7	0
Chorley	2019–20	National League	33	1	2	0	—		3 (Note: Two appearances in the FA Trophy, one appearance in the Lancashire Senior Cup)	0	38	1
Chorley	2020–21	National League North	17	0	6	0	—		1	0	24	0
Chorley	2021–22	National League North	42	1	2	0	—		3 (Note: One appearance in the FA Trophy, one appearance in the Lancashire FA Challenge Trophy and one appearance in National League North play-offs)	0	47	1
Chorley	Total		92	2	10	0	—		7	0	109	2
Career total			136	3	12	0	0	0	15	0	163	3

== Honours ==
Ashton United

- Northern Premier League Premier Division play-offs: 2017–18
