= Ashley Hunter (footballer) =

English footballer (born 1995)

Personal information
- Full name: Ashley Matthew Hunter
- Date of birth: 29 September 1995 (age 31)
- Place of birth: Derby, England
- Height: 1.78 m (5 ft 10 in)
- Position: Forward

Team information
- Current team: Ilkeston Town

Youth career
- Derby County
- Aston Villa
- Barnsley
- –2014: Burton Albion
- 2014: Ilkeston

Senior career*
Years	Team	Apps	(Gls)
2014–2015	Ilkeston	10	(4)
2015–2020	Fleetwood Town	181	(31)
2020	→ Salford City (loan)	11	(5)
2020–2022	Salford City	74	(8)
2022–2023	Morecambe	20	(1)
2023–2024	Milton Keynes Dons	6	(0)
2024	AFC Fylde	12	(1)
2024–2025	Accrington Stanley	21	(0)
2025–2026	Marine	15	(1)
2026–	Ilkeston Town	0	(0)
- * Club domestic league appearances and goals as of 16:08, 31 July 2026 (UTC)

Ashley "Ash" Matthew Hunter (born 29 September 1995) is an English semi-professional footballer who plays as a forward for Northern Premier League Premier Division club Ilkeston Town.

After spending time in the youth setups of several clubs in the Midlands and Yorkshire, Hunter began his career with non-league Ilkeston, where he made his début in 2014. He quickly attracted the attention of Fleetwood Town, where he made over 200 appearances before departing for Salford in 2020.

== Career ==
=== Early career ===
Hunter joined Northern Premier League side Ilkeston after being released by Burton Albion in summer 2014. After scoring 13 goals for Ilkeston's under-21 side, he made an immediate impact in the first team, scoring twice in his first start for the club. He was signed by League One side Fleetwood Town for a "sizeable fee" in January 2015.

=== Fleetwood Town ===
Hunter made his Fleetwood début on 7 February, coming on as substitute in a 1–1 with Peterborough United in a League One fixture and almost setting up a goal for Jamie Proctor. His first goal came on 6 April when he scored Fleetwood's final goal in a 4–0 win against Yeovil Town. His next goal came on 6 October in the first game of new manager Steven Pressley, scoring the equaliser in an eventual 2–1 victory against Shrewsbury Town in the second round of the EFL Trophy. On Boxing Day, Hunter came on as a substitute and scored instantly to secure a 1–1 draw in the league against Shrewsbury.

On 10 August 2016, Hunter scored an 11th-minute equaliser against Leeds United in the first round of the EFL Cup, taking the two teams into a penalty shoot-out which Fleetwood lost 5–4, with Hunter converting his penalty. A week later, Hunter signed a new three-year contract with Fleetwood. The next day, he came on as a substitute and scored to make it 2–0 against Oxford United to secure Fleetwood's first win of the season. On 27 August, he scored his sides second in another 2–0 win, this time away to Southend United, their first away victory of the season. Hunter was awarded the man of the match for his performance in the FA Cup first round replay against Southport, scoring one goal and creating another in extra-time of a 4–1 win. In the replay of their second-round game against Shrewsbury, Hunter scored the winning goal in the 95th minute to help Fleetwood complete a comeback from 2–0 down, and reach the third round for the second time in their history.

On 9 September, Hunter scored a 93rd-minute penalty to secure a point at home to Oldham Athletic, and three days later he scored the winning goal against Bury in a 3–2 victory. on Boxing Day, Hunter scored Fleetwood's second goal of a 2–1 win in the reverse fixture against Oldham, their first win in nine games. He opened the scoring four days later in the second league meeting against Bury, a 2–0 victory which ensured back-to-back away wins for the first time in the season. On 25 February 2018, Hunter scored the first goal in the reign of new manager John Sheridan, scoring the equaliser in a 1–1 draw with Milton Keynes. In March 2018, he signed a new three-year deal to keep him contracted to the club until 2021.

On 14 August, Hunter scored the winning penalty in the first round of the EFL Cup after a 1–1 draw with Crewe Alexandra. On 1 September, he scored the winner to help new manager Joey Barton win his first home game as manager, a 2–1 win against Bradford City. After receiving five yellow cards in the opening nine games, Hunter received a one-match ban, missing a fixture against Barnsley as a result.

On 2 March 2019, he came off the bench to score Fleetwood's second in a 2–0 win against Plymouth Argyle, keeping their chances of a play-off place alive. On 19 April, he scored a 94th-minute equaliser against Peterborough United, helping keep the pressure off Barton.

==== Salford City (loan) ====
In January 2020, Fleetwood manager Joey Barton reported that he was due to go out on loan to Salford City after an agreement was made between the clubs. The move was later confirmed by Salford.

On 18 January, Hunter was sent off on his début after picking up two yellow cards in a match against Forest Green Rovers. He scored his first goal for the club ten days later, scoring the third goal of a 4–0 away win against Cambridge United, when he "hooked a fine finish into the far corner". On 7 March, Hunter scored both goals in a 2–0 victory against Bradford City, the first of which was later voted Salford's goal of the season.

=== Salford City ===
Hunter joined Salford permanently on 17 July, signing a two-year deal for an undisclosed fee. He scored his first goal after rejoining the club on the opening day of the 2020–21 season against Exeter City, scoring the equalising goal in a 2–2 draw. On 24 November, he scored two "stunning" goals in a 2–1 victory over Morecambe. On 6 December, Hunter scored the only goal against Barrow in the club's first Football League game with an attendance since 1972. He was released by Salford at the end of the 2021–22 season.

=== Morecambe ===
On 12 July 2022, Hunter joined League One club Morecambe on a one-year deal.

=== Milton Keynes Dons ===
On 4 August 2023, Hunter joined League Two club Milton Keynes Dons on a free transfer following his release from Morecambe. He made his debut a day later in the opening game of the 2023–24 season on 5 August 2023, in a 5–3 away win over Wrexham having come on as a 78th-minute substitute.

On 26 January 2024, Hunter departed the club having had his contract terminated by mutual consent.

=== AFC Fylde ===
On 31 January 2024, Hunter joined National League club AFC Fylde on a short-term contract until the end of the season. He departed the club at the end of his short-term contract.

=== Accrington Stanley ===
On 6 August 2024, Hunter joined Accrington Stanley on a one year deal.

On 9 May 2025, Accrington Stanley announced the player would be leaving when his contract expired in June.

=== Marine ===
On 8 August 2025, Hunter joined National League North club Marine.

In November 2025, he suffered an anterior cruciate ligament injury that would rule him out for the remainder of the season.

=== Ilkeston Town ===
On 30 July 2026, Hunter joined Northern Premier League Premier Division club Ilkeston Town, the phoenix club of his first club Ilkeston.

== Career statistics ==
As of end of 2025–26 season

Appearances and goals by club, season and competition
Club	Season	League			FA Cup		League Cup		Other		Total	
Club	Season	Division	Apps	Goals	Apps	Goals	Apps	Goals	Apps	Goals	Apps	Goals
Ilkeston	2014–15	NPL Premier Division	10	4	0	0	—		4 (Note: Two appearances in Northern Premier League Challenge Cup; one appearance in FA Trophy; one appearance in Derbyshire Senior Cup)	0	14	4
Fleetwood Town	2014–15	League One	12	1	—		—		—		12	1
Fleetwood Town	2015–16	League One	24	5	0	0	0	0	4 (Note: Appearance(s) in Football League Trophy)	2	28	7
Fleetwood Town	2016–17	League One	44	8	6	2	1	1	4 (Note: Two appearances in Football League Trophy; two appearances in League One play-offs)	0	55	11
Fleetwood Town	2017–18	League One	44	9	5	0	1	0	5	0	55	9
Fleetwood Town	2018–19	League One	43	8	3	1	1	0	0	0	47	9
Fleetwood Town	2019–20	League One	14	0	1	1	1	0	3	0	19	1
Fleetwood Town	Total		181	31	15	4	4	1	16	2	216	38
Salford City (loan)	2019–20	League Two	11	5	—		—		—		11	5
Salford City	2020–21	League Two	41	7	2	0	2	0	2	1	47	8
Salford City	2021–22	League Two	33	1	0	0	1	0	1	0	35	1
Salford City	Total		85	13	2	0	3	0	3	1	93	14
Morecambe	2022–23	League One	20	1	—		1	0	—		21	1
Milton Keynes Dons	2023–24	League Two	6	0	0	0	1	0	1	0	8	0
AFC Fylde	2023–24	National League	12	1	—		—		0	0	12	1
Accrington Stanley	2024–25	League Two	21	0	3	0	1	0	3	1	28	1
Marine	2025–26	National League North	15	1	2	1	—		0	0	17	2
Career total			350	51	22	5	10	1	27	4	409	61

== Honours ==
Salford City

- EFL Trophy: 2019–20
