= Cian Bolger =

Irish footballer

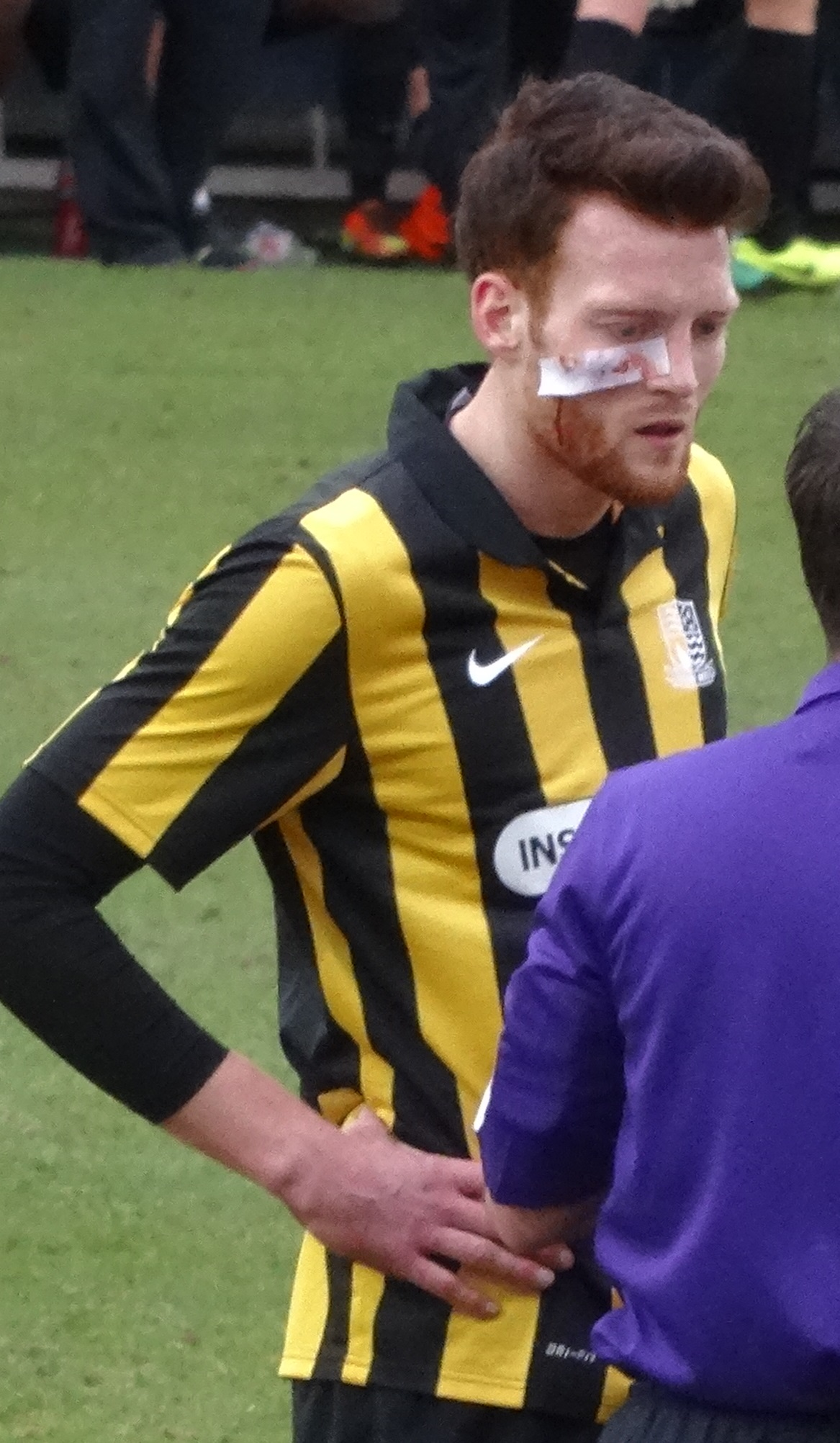
- Bolger playing for Southend United in 2014

Personal information
- Full name: Cian Thomas Bolger
- Date of birth: 12 March 1992 (age 34)
- Place of birth: Celbridge, Ireland
- Height: 1.93 m (6 ft 4 in)
- Position: Centre back

Team information
- Current team: Larne
- Number: 18

Youth career
- 2004-2008: Celbridge Town
- 2008–2010: Leicester City

Senior career*
Years	Team	Apps	(Gls)
2010–2013	Leicester City	0	(0)
2011	→ Bristol Rovers (loan)	6	(0)
2011–2012	→ Bristol Rovers (loan)	39	(2)
2012–2013	→ Bristol Rovers (loan)	4	(0)
2013–2014	Bolton Wanderers	0	(0)
2013	→ Colchester United (loan)	4	(0)
2014	→ Southend United (loan)	1	(0)
2014–2016	Southend United	45	(1)
2016	→ Bury (loan)	9	(0)
2016–2019	Fleetwood Town	85	(9)
2019–2020	Lincoln City	45	(1)
2020–2021	Northampton Town	26	(1)
2021–	Larne	108	(2)

International career
2010	Republic of Ireland U19	2	(0)
2013	Republic of Ireland U21	2	(0)
- * Club domestic league appearances and goals as of 26 November 2025

Cian Thomas Bolger (born 12 March 1992) is an Irish professional footballer who plays as a defender for Larne.

== Club career ==
=== Leicester City ===
Son of Declan who played for Dublin county football team Bolger was born in Celbridge, County Kildare, Ireland, and was Leicester City's academy Player of the Year in 2009.

==== Loans to Bristol Rovers ====
He joined Bristol Rovers on a one-month loan on 17 January 2011, and he made his Football League debut when he came on as a 78th-minute substitute for Carl Regan in a 6–1 defeat to Walsall on 29 January 2011. Bolger was sent off for the first time in his senior career on 8 February 2011, after a second yellow card for a poor challenge on Rochdale player Chris O'Grady. On 11 July, Bolger returned to Bristol Rovers on a 6-month loan deal. On 24 September 2011, Bolger scored the first professional goal of his career. On 27 January 2012, his loan was extended until the end of the season.

On 31 August 2012, Bolger was loaned to Bristol Rovers for a third time, until January 2013. On 8 September 2012 he sustained a cruciate ligament injury in a 2–2 draw against Aldershot Town, which prevented him from playing for over 3 months. He made his comeback on Boxing Day, coincidentally in another 2–2 draw against Aldershot, playing the full 90 minutes.

=== Bolton Wanderers ===
On 31 January 2013, Bolger signed for Bolton Wanderers. On 28 March, he scored the winner for Bolton Wanderers Reserves in a 3–2 win over Stoke City Reserves. He is a former captain of the Bolton Development squad but didn't make any appearances for the first team squad during his time at Bolton.

==== Colchester United (loan) ====
In October 2013 Bolger signed a one-month loan deal with Colchester United and made 4 league appearances.

==== Southend United (loan) ====
On 21 February 2014, Bolger joined League Two side Southend United on a 28-day loan, but his loan spell was cut short after just one appearance due to an ankle injury on 24 February 2014.

=== Southend United ===
On 5 August 2014 Bolger signed a two-year permanent deal with Southend United.

On 14 April 2015, Bolger scored his first goal for Southend United in the 45th minute against Newport County with a towering header. Bolger scored Southend's final penalty in the shoot-out in the play-off final on 23 May 2015, Southend were promoted winning 7–6.

=== Fleetwood Town ===
Bolger signed for Fleetwood Town on 22 May 2016, and went on to make over 100 appearances for the club. He scored his first goal for Fleetwood in an FA Cup tie against Southport on 15 November 2016.

=== Lincoln City ===
Bolger signed for Lincoln City on 17 January 2019.

=== Northampton Town ===
Bolger signed a one-year contract at Northampton Town on 21 August 2020 ahead of the 2020–21 campaign.

=== Larne ===
After a single season at Northampton, Bolger signed for NIFL Premiership club Larne on 5 July 2021.

== Career statistics ==
As of 9 May 2021

Club	Season	League			FA Cup		League Cup		Other		Total	
Club	Season	Division	Apps	Goals	Apps	Goals	Apps	Goals	Apps	Goals	Apps	Goals
Leicester City	2010–11	Championship	0	0	0	0	0	0	—		0	0
Leicester City	2011–12	Championship	0	0	0	0	0	0	—		0	0
Leicester City	Total		0	0	0	0	0	0	0	0	0	0
Bristol Rovers (loan)	2010–11	League One	6	0	0	0	0	0	0	0	6	0
Bristol Rovers (loan)	2011–12	League Two	38	2	2	0	1	0	0	0	41	2
Bristol Rovers (loan)	2012–13	League Two	4	0	0	0	0	0	1 (Note: Appearance(s) in the Football League Trophy)	0	5	0
Bolton Wanderers	2012–13	Championship	0	0	0	0	0	0	0	0	0	0
Colchester United (loan)	2013–14	League One	4	0	0	0	0	0	0	0	4	0
Southend United (loan)	2013–14	League Two	1	0	0	0	0	0	0	0	1	0
Southend United	2014–15	League Two	23	1	0	0	0	0	3 (Note: Appearances in the League Two play-offs)	0	26	1
Southend United	2015–16	League One	22	0	1	0	1	0	1	0	25	0
Southend United	Total		45	1	1	0	1	0	4	0	51	1
Bury (loan)	2015–16	League One	9	0	0	0	0	0	0	0	9	0
Fleetwood Town	2016–17	League One	33	5	6	1	1	0	3 (Note: Two appearances in the Football League Trophy and one appearance in the League One play-offs)	0	43	6
Fleetwood Town	2017–18	League One	41	3	5	2	1	0	2	1	49	6
Fleetwood Town	2018–19	League One	11	1	2	0	2	0	2	0	17	1
Fleetwood Town	Total		85	9	13	3	4	0	8	0	110	12
Lincoln City	2018–19	League Two	17	1	0	0	0	0	0	0	17	1
Lincoln City	2019–20	League One	28	0	1	0	2	0	2	0	33	0
Lincoln City	Total		45	1	1	0	2	0	2	0	50	1
Northampton Town	2020–21	League One	26	1	0	0	2	0	3	0	31	1
Career total			263	14	17	3	10	0	17	1	307	18

== Honours ==
Southend United

- Football League Two play-offs: 2015

Lincoln City

- EFL League Two: 2018–19

Larne

- NIFL Premiership: 2022–23, 2023–24
- County Antrim Shield: 2021–22, 2022–23, 2023–24
- NIFL Charity Shield: 2024

Individual

- NIFL Premiership Team of the Season: 2022–23, 2023–24
- Fleetwood Town Player of the Year: 2016–17
