= Lewie Coyle =

English footballer (born 1995)

- Coyle in 2026

Personal information
- Full name: Lewie Jacob Coyle
- Date of birth: 15 October 1995 (age 31)
- Place of birth: Kingston upon Hull, England
- Height: 5 ft 8 in (1.73 m)
- Positions: Right back; left back; centre back

Team information
- Current team: Hull City
- Number: 2

Youth career
- 2004–2014: Leeds United

Senior career*
Years	Team	Apps	(Gls)
2014–2020	Leeds United	15	(0)
2014	→ Harrogate Town (loan)	2	(0)
2017–2019	→ Fleetwood Town (loan)	105	(0)
2020	Fleetwood Town	12	(1)
2020–	Hull City	227	(3)
- * Club domestic league appearances and goals as of 19:59, 22 August 2026 (UTC)

Lewie Jacob Coyle (born 15 October 1995) is an English professional footballer who plays as a right back and captains Premier League club Hull City.

== Career ==
=== Leeds United ===
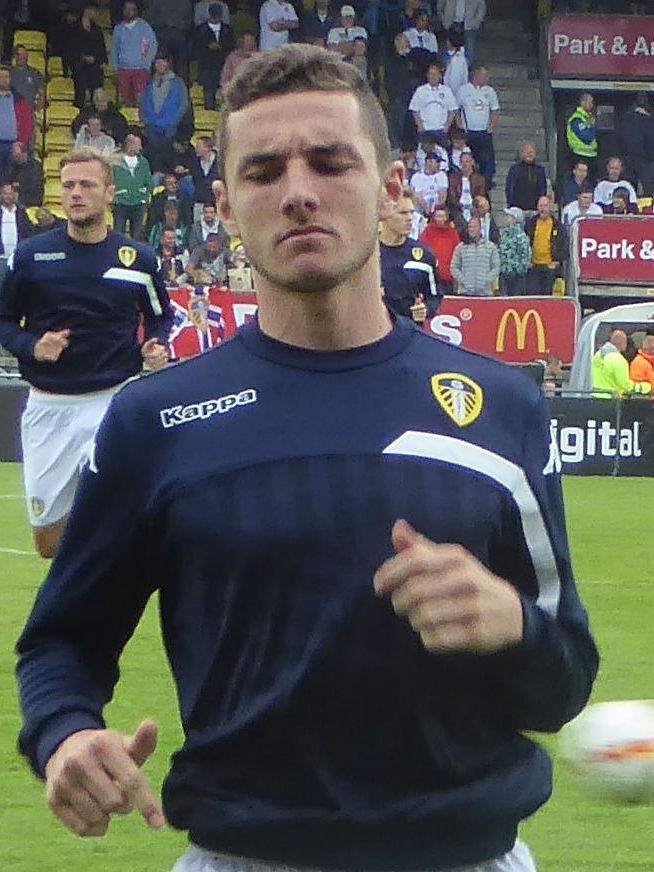
Coyle in 2015.

Coyle started his footballing life at Leeds United and hit the headlines as a 10-year-old when he was involved in an alleged tapping-up scandal with Chelsea. Coyle's father alleged that he was offered £10,000 'in readies' and the promise of a new kitchen if his son were to attend a one-week trial with the Premier League champions. It was also claimed that Spanish giants Barcelona had made an offer for Coyle around the same time.

Coyle made his first start on 9 January 2016 against Rotherham United to help Leeds advance to the fourth round of the FA Cup in a 2–0 victory.

On 26 October 2016, Coyle picked up a knee injury in normal time against Norwich City in the English League Cup. His injury was after Leeds had used all their substitutes and saw Leeds down to 10 men for all of the 30 minutes of extra time; however they managed to secure a penalty shootout victory after a 2–2 draw. On 3 November, despite being out injured, Coyle signed a two-year extension deal at the club to run until the end of the 2019 season.

On 9 January 2017, Coyle made his return from injury in Leeds' 2–1 FA Cup win against Cambridge United. On 13 January 2017, Coyle made his first start in the League of the 2016–17 season in a 1–0 win against Derby County to send Leeds third in the EFL Championship table. On 29 January 2017, Coyle gave away a costly penalty against Sutton United in the FA Cup. The penalty, converted by Jamie Collins, saw Leeds knocked out in a 1–0 defeat.

=== Fleetwood Town ===
On 4 July 2017, Coyle agreed a new three-year deal with Leeds United, running until 2020 and, the same day, went out on a season-long loan to League One club Fleetwood Town, for the 2017–18 season, linking up with one of his former Leeds head coaches, Uwe Rosler.

Coyle impressed early on for Fleetwood, receiving several man of the match awards in his first few games. On 6 November 2017, Coyle received the first red card of his career after being sent off in Fleetwood's FA Cup 2–1 victory against Chorley. On 6 January 2018, Coyle also was part of the side who caused an FA Cup upset, earning a replay after a 0–0 draw against Premier League opponents Leicester City. In January, facing an injury and suspension crisis under then head coach Thomas Christiansen, Leeds considered recalling Coyle from his loan, but decided to not exercise the recall to ensure a guaranteed run of games at Fleetwood.

In March 2018, Coyle received special praise from new Fleetwood manager John Sheridan, citing him as a player who always gives 100% in training and during the matches and that Coyle was an example to the whole squad. On 24 March 2018, Coyle was nominated for both Player Of The Year and Young Player Of The Year awards at Fleetwood's annual ceremony. He won the Players' Player of the Year Award and the fan-voted Junior Cod Army Player of the Year Award.

On 27 June 2018, Coyle rejoined Fleetwood Town on a 6-month loan under new manager Joey Barton. He made his second debut for the club on 4 August, starting in the 1–0 loss against AFC Wimbledon. In December, with Leeds facing an injury crisis, Barton was asked if Coyle might return to his parent club in January. He said: "for us he has been first class; he trains properly, he is willing to learn, open all ears and is keen on developing as a player. For me he is a pleasure to work with, someone who you would love at your football club".

Barton converted Coyle into a central midfielder and left-back over the second half of the season, with forward Wes Burns occupying Coyle's usual right-back slot. Barton praised Coyle for his versatility and his performances in his new positions. Coyle made 45 appearances for Fleetwood in all competitions in his second spell at the club.

Coyle made it three consecutive loan spells with Fleetwood Town when he joined ahead of the 2019–20 season. The deal was made permanent in January 2020 when he signed a three-and-a-half-year contract.

=== Hull City ===
On 7 August 2020, Coyle signed for Hull City on a three-year deal with an optional 12-month extension for an undisclosed fee. Coyle made his debut on 20 October 2020 in the 1–0 home win against AFC Wimbledon. He faced his former team in the EFL Trophy on 12 January 2021, and deep in extra-time scored his first goal for Hull City to give them a 3–2 victory over Fleetwood Town and allow Hull to progress to the fourth round of the competition.

On 28 July 2022, Coyle was appointed club captain for the 2022–23 season. On 19 June 2023, Coyle signed a new three-year deal with the club.

== Personal life ==
A sporting family, Coyle's eldest brother Tommy is a professional boxer and former Commonwealth lightweight champion. His younger brother Rocco is at Hull City in the Youth Academy after joining from Leeds United. His elder brother Joe is a professional golfer.

In May 2025, a video surfaced online of a topless man, believed to be Coyle, involved in a street fight outside the Empress Pub, Hull. In the video, another man, suspected to be Rocco Coyle, is seen intervening and alleviating the situation. On 5 May, Hull City said they were investigating the matter but would not make any further comment at that moment. The next day, it was reported that a 39-year-old man had been charged with a public order offence in relation to the incident and had been released on conditional bail ahead of an upcoming trial at Hull Magistrates' Court.

== Career statistics ==
As of 22 August 2026

Appearances and goals by club, season and competition
Club	Season	League			FA Cup		League Cup		Other		Total	
Club	Season	Division	Apps	Goals	Apps	Goals	Apps	Goals	Apps	Goals	Apps	Goals
Leeds United	2015–16	Championship	11	0	2	0	0	0	–	–	13	0
Leeds United	2016–17	Championship	4	0	2	0	4	0	–	–	10	0
Leeds United	Total		15	0	4	0	4	0	0	0	23	0
Harrogate Town (loan)	2014–15	Conference North	2	0	0	0	–	–	–	–	2	0
Fleetwood Town (loan)	2017–18	League One	42	0	4	0	1	0	1 (Note: Appearances in the EFL Trophy)	0	48	0
Fleetwood Town (loan)	2018–19	League One	41	0	3	0	1	0	0	0	45	0
Fleetwood Town (loan)	2019–20	League One	22	0	3	0	1	0	3	0	29	0
Fleetwood Town	2019–20	League One	12	1	0	0	0	0	1	0	13	1
Fleetwood Town	Total		117	1	10	0	3	0	5	0	135	1
Hull City	2020–21	League One	28	0	1	0	2	0	3	1	34	1
Hull City	2021–22	Championship	23	1	0	0	0	0	0	0	23	1
Hull City	2022–23	Championship	41	0	1	0	1	0	0	0	43	0
Hull City	2023–24	Championship	40	1	1	0	1	0	0	0	42	1
Hull City	2024–25	Championship	44	1	1	0	1	0	0	0	46	1
Hull City	2025–26	Championship	39	0	2	0	0	0	3 (Note: Appearances in EFL Championship play-offs)	0	44	0
Hull City	2026–27	Premier League	4	0	0	0	1	0	—		5	0
Hull City	Total		219	3	6	0	6	0	6	1	237	4
Career Total			353	4	20	0	13	0	11	1	397	5

== Honours ==
Hull City

- EFL Championship play-offs: 2026
- EFL League One: 2020–21

Individual

- PFA Team of the Year: 2020–21 League One
- Fleetwood Town Players' Player of the Year: 2017–18
- Fleetwood Town Junior Cod Army Player of the Year: 2017–18
