= Conor McAleny =

English footballer (born 1992)

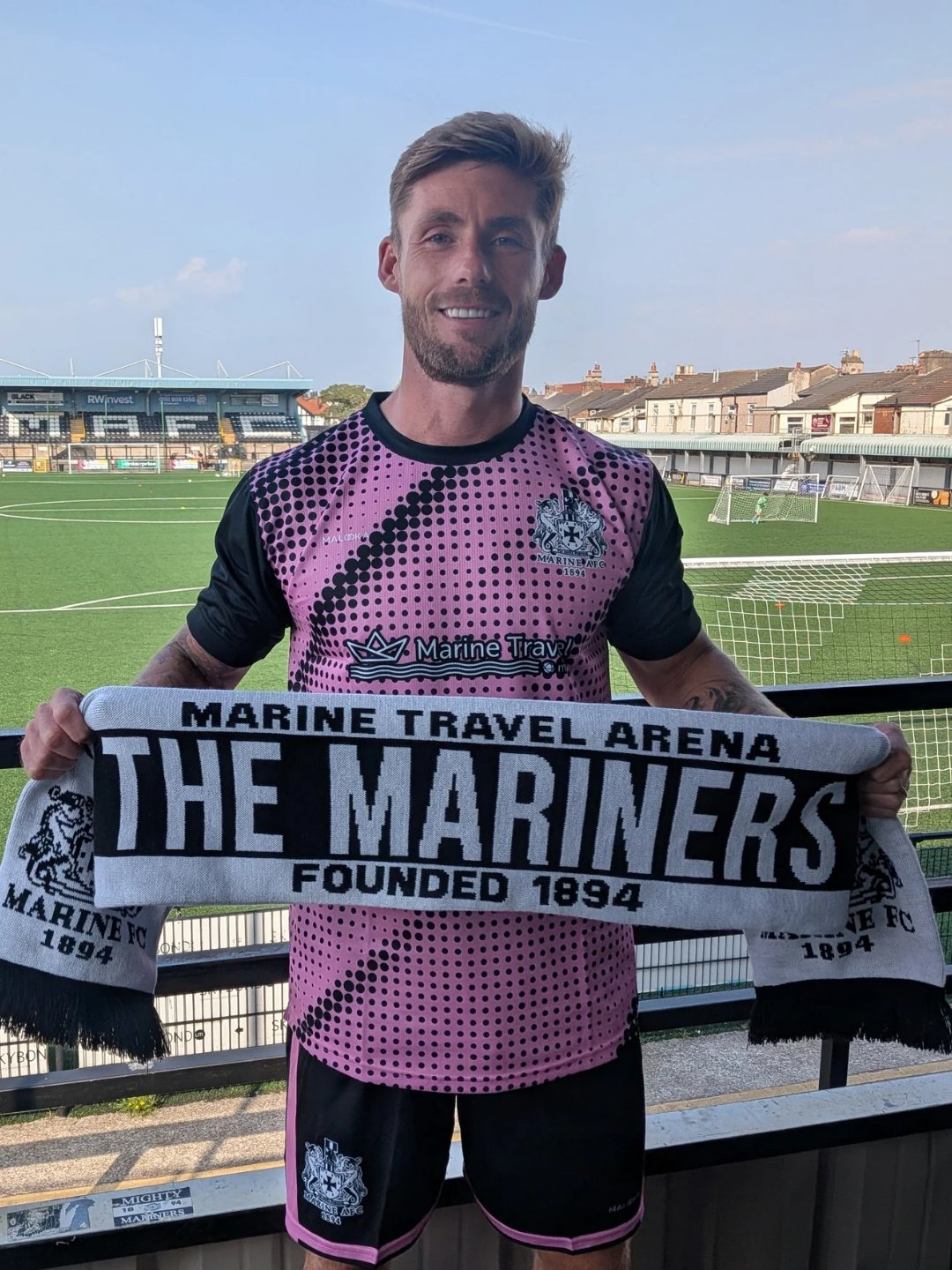
- McAleny joining Marine in 2026

Personal information
- Full name: Conor Michael McAleny
- Date of birth: 12 August 1992 (age 34)
- Place of birth: Whiston, England
- Height: 5 ft 10 in (1.78 m)
- Positions: Attacking midfielder; forward

Team information
- Current team: Marine

Youth career
- 2003–2011: Everton

Senior career*
Years	Team	Apps	(Gls)
2011–2017	Everton	2	(0)
2012	→ Scunthorpe United (loan)	3	(0)
2013	→ Brentford (loan)	4	(0)
2015	→ Cardiff City (loan)	8	(2)
2015	→ Charlton Athletic (loan)	9	(0)
2016	→ Wigan Athletic (loan)	13	(4)
2017	→ Oxford United (loan)	19	(10)
2017–2020	Fleetwood Town	70	(9)
2019	→ Kilmarnock (loan)	13	(3)
2020	→ Shrewsbury Town (loan)	5	(0)
2020–2021	Oldham Athletic	46	(21)
2021–2025	Salford City	121	(20)
2025–2026	Harrogate Town	21	(3)
2026	→ AFC Fylde (loan)	6	(2)
2026–	Marine	7	(1)
- * Club domestic league appearances and goals as of 18:11, 26 March 2026 (UTC)

Conor Michael McAleny (born 12 August 1992) is an English professional footballer who plays as an attacking midfielder or striker for Marine. He is a product of the Everton academy.

While at Everton, he spent time on loan at Football League teams Scunthorpe United, Brentford, Cardiff City, Charlton Athletic, Wigan Athletic, and Oxford United, before leaving on a permanent basis in 2017 to join Fleetwood Town. He enjoyed little success at Fleetwood, and spent time out on loan at Scottish club Kilmarnock and Shrewsbury Town. He joined Oldham Athletic in 2020, spending a year at the club and scoring 21 goals before departing for Salford.

== Career ==
=== Everton ===
McAleny was born in Whiston, Merseyside. He joined Everton as an 11-year-old and made his debut for the club's youth team in a 1–0 Premier Academy League win over Tottenham Hotspur on 25 August 2007, replacing Lewis Codling after 65 minutes. He became a full-time member of the club's academy in 2008, at age 17, making regular appearances for the youth team during the 2008–09 season, and received his first call up to the reserve team for a Premier Reserve League North match against rivals Liverpool on 17 February 2009; he remained on the bench for the 1–1 draw. McAleny broke into the reserve team during the 2009–10 season, making his debut in a 1–0 defeat to Manchester United on 6 October, replacing Jose Baxter after 61 minutes. His form for the youth and reserve teams saw him awarded his first call into the first-team squad for a dead rubber Europa League group match versus BATE Borisov on 17 December. Awarded the number 40 shirt, McAleny was named on the bench in a youthful squad, but did not make an appearance in the 1–0 defeat. He finished the season with 26 appearances and 12 goals for the youth team.

McAleny received his first call up for a Premier League match versus Aston Villa on 2 April 2011. Awarded the number 31 shirt, he remained on the bench for the 2–2 draw, and was included in the squad again for a 3–0 victory over Wolverhampton Wanderers in the following game. McAleny made his first-team debut as a second-half substitute for Phil Neville in a 1–0 league defeat away to Arsenal on 10 December 2011, nearly scoring with a volley. He made his first home appearance in the following game, coming on for Louis Saha in a 1–1 draw against Norwich City. McAleny signed a new two-year contract in the summer of 2012. No longer eligible for the youth team, he played exclusively for the reserve team during the 2012–13 season, though ankle and ligament injuries hindered his progress. After spending much of the first half of the 2013–14 season out with a broken leg, McAleny received his first call into the first-team squad in over two years, when he was named as a substitute for an FA Cup fourth round tie versus Stevenage on 25 January 2014. He remained on the bench for the 4–0 victory. He also returned to reserve team action, scoring three goals in two games in March. Having come to the end of his contract, McAleny was offered a new deal at the end of the season. On 1 July, it was announced that McAleny had signed a new three-year contract, after being assured he was part of manager Roberto Martínez's plans.

==== Scunthorpe United and Brentford loans ====
On 23 March 2012, McAleny joined League One side Scunthorpe United on loan for the remainder of the season. He made his debut the following day, coming on as a 65th-minute substitute for Jordan Robertson in a 0–0 home draw with Notts County. A knee injury saw him make just three appearances for the club.

On 25 July 2013, he joined League One side Brentford on loan until 6 January 2014, linking up with former Everton teammates Adam Forshaw and Jake Bidwell. On 24 August, in only his fourth appearance for the club, he broke his leg in a clash with Walsall's Adam Chambers. On 2 September, Brentford announced that the loan arrangement had been brought to an early end, as McAleny was expected to miss most of the 2013–14 season. Brentford manager Uwe Rosler said that he would be "a big miss, he would be welcome back any time". McAleny attracted further transfer interest from the Bees in March and June 2014.

==== Cardiff City and Charlton Athletic loans ====
On 2 February 2015, McAleny joined Championship side Cardiff City on loan until the end of the season. On 3 March he scored his first professional goal, in a 3–1 win at Rotherham United. He scored again on 4 April, set up by Aron Gunnarsson, to equalise in a 1–1 draw against Reading at the Madejski Stadium. Cardiff manager Russell Slade praised McAleny for the manner in which he scored, saying there weren't many players who could have scored it. Tactically, Slade used him in at tip of the midfield diamond in a 4–4–2, allowing McAleny to impress with his quick feet, vision and ability to find a pass.

On 14 September 2015, he joined Championship side Charlton Athletic on loan until 7 November. The next day, he made his debut as a 74th-minute substitute replacing Morgan Fox in a 2–1 home defeat to Huddersfield Town. On 23 September, he made his first start in a 4–1 League Cup away defeat to Crystal Palace. He was replaced by Tony Watt in the 75th minute. On 5 November, two days before the end of his loan contract, he was sent back to Everton after not scoring in any of his nine games during his short spell. During his time at Charlton, manager Guy Luzon used him as a winger rather than an attacking midfielder.

==== Wigan Athletic and Oxford United loans ====
On 1 February 2016, McAleny joined League One side Wigan Athletic on loan for the until the end of the season. McAleny said he was persuaded to join the club by Everton manager Roberto Martinez, himself a former Wigan player and manager. On 6 February, he scored on his début against Sheffield United, scoring the second goal in a 2–0 win, and followed it up with the opening goal of a 2–1 win against fellow promotion chasers Walsall, a 35-yard strike he described himself as "shocked" to score. Having come on as a substitute, He scored a crucial match-winner against Rochdale on 28 March, which helped extend Wigan's unbeaten run to 18. Overall, he played 13 times and scored 4 goals, and speaking to local newspaper the Wigan Post, he said that he was "really enjoying" his time at the club.

In January 2017, in the final hours of the transfer window, Oxford United of League One announced that he had joined on loan until the end of the season. Oxford manager Michael Appleton said "he works hard, knows where the goal is and we think will give us another goal threat during the busiest part of the season". He scored his first goal for the club, the only goal of the game, in a 1–0 away League One victory over Charlton on 21 February, and followed up with a hat-trick in a 4–0 away win at Chesterfield the following Saturday. McAleny scored a second hat-trick in a 5–1 home win over Bury on 28 March. He finished the season having scored 10 league goals in 14 starts. On 9 June, it was confirmed that he would be leaving Everton following the expiration of his contract at the end of the month.

=== Fleetwood Town ===
On 23 June 2017, McAleny joined Fleetwood Town on a free transfer, signing a three-year contract. Fleetwood beat off competition from several Championship clubs, according to chairman Andy Pilley. Manager Uwe Rösler praised him for his ambition and attitude, acknowledging that he could have signed for another club for more money. He scored twice for Fleetwood on his debut in a 2–0 win over Rotherham United on 5 August. On 5 April 2018, he scored a 93rd-minute winner against former club Oxford to secure Fleetwood's survival in League One.

During his final two seasons at the club, he was deemed back-up to Ched Evans and Paddy Madden, and with Fleetwood playing only one striker, found game time hard to come by, but scored his first FA Cup goal when he came off the bench in a 2–1 defeat to Portsmouth.

==== Kilmarnock and Shrewsbury Town loans ====
On 28 January 2019, McAleny joined Scottish Premiership club Kilmarnock on loan until the end of the season. He scored on his début, scoring Kilmarnock's first equaliser in a 2–2 draw with Dundee. He scored Kilmarnock's opening goal at Ibrox Stadium in their 1–1 with Rangers, securing the club's place in the top six for a second consecutive season. Killie eventually finished third in the league, ensuring European football for the first time since 2001, though McAleny would return to Fleetwood at the end of the season.

On 30 January 2020, McAleny joined fellow League One side Shrewsbury Town on loan until the end of the 2019–20 season. He made his debut for the club on 1 February, a narrow 1–0 defeat away to Rochdale at Spotland. His performance was praised by local newspaper the Shropshire Star, who said he was the standout performer for Shrewsbury while playing on the left of a front three.

=== Oldham Athletic ===
On 18 August 2020, McAleny joined League Two side Oldham Athletic on a free transfer signing a one-year contract for the 2020–21 season. He scored on his debut for Oldham in a 3–0 EFL Cup win over Carlisle United on 5 September 2020. With his contract close to expiring, Oldham held talks with McAleny about a new deal amid interest from Ipswich Town, Bradford City, and Bristol Rovers.

=== Salford City ===
On 1 July 2021, having not reported back for Oldham's pre-season training ahead of the new season, McAleny joined fellow League Two side Salford City on a two-year deal, citing the club's ambitions for promotion to League One as motivation for signing. On 28 August, he scored his first goal for Salford in his side's 3–0 home win against Newport County. He won the EFL League Two Player of the Month award for January 2023, having scored six goals in as many matches.

On 12 May 2025, the club announced he would be released in June when his contract expires.

=== Harrogate Town ===
On 8 August 2025, McAleny signed a one-year contract with fellow League Two club Harrogate Town.

On 26 March 2026, McAleny joined National League North leaders AFC Fylde on loan for the remainder of the season.

On 15 May 2026, Harrogate announced the player would be released in the summer once his contract had expired.

=== Marine ===
In June 2026, following the announcement of his release from Harrogate Town, McAleny joined Marine ahead of the 2026–27 season.

== Personal life ==
McAleny hails from Huyton, Merseyside, he represented Knowsley in the 2005 Merseyside Youth Games, participating in the 80-metre sprint, shot put and triple jump.

== Career statistics ==
As of match played 31 January 2026

Appearances and goals by club, season and competition
Club	Season	League			FA Cup		League Cup		Other		Total	
Club	Season	Division	Apps	Goals	Apps	Goals	Apps	Goals	Apps	Goals	Apps	Goals
Everton	2011–12	Premier League	2	0	0	0	0	0	—		2	0
Everton	2012–13	Premier League	0	0	0	0	0	0	—		0	0
Everton	2013–14	Premier League	0	0	0	0	0	0	—		0	0
Everton	2014–15	Premier League	0	0	0	0	0	0	1 (Note: Appearance in UEFA Europa League)	0	1	0
Everton	2015–16	Premier League	0	0	0	0	0	0	—		0	0
Everton	2016–17	Premier League	0	0	0	0	0	0	—		0	0
Everton	Total		2	0	0	0	0	0	1	0	3	0
Everton U23	2016–17	—			—		—		2 (Note: Appearance(s) in EFL Trophy)	1	2	1
Scunthorpe United (loan)	2011–12	League One	3	0	0	0	0	0	0	0	3	0
Brentford (loan)	2013–14	League One	4	0	0	0	0	0	0	0	4	0
Cardiff City (loan)	2014–15	Championship	8	2	0	0	0	0	0	0	8	2
Charlton Athletic (loan)	2015–16	Championship	8	0	0	0	1	0	0	0	9	0
Wigan Athletic (loan)	2015–16	League One	13	4	0	0	—		0	0	13	4
Oxford United (loan)	2016–17	League One	18	10	1	0	0	0	0	0	19	10
Fleetwood Town	2017–18	League One	29	5	2	0	1	0	2	0	34	5
Fleetwood Town	2018–19	League One	14	0	1	0	2	0	2	1	19	1
Fleetwood Town	2019–20	League One	12	2	2	1	1	0	2	0	17	3
Fleetwood Town	Total		55	7	5	1	4	0	6	1	70	9
Kilmarnock (loan)	2018–19	Scottish Premiership	11	3	2	0	0	0	—		13	3
Shrewsbury Town (loan)	2019–20	League One	5	0	—		—		—		5	0
Oldham Athletic	2020–21	League Two	40	17	2	1	2	1	2	2	46	21
Salford City	2021–22	League Two	24	2	1	0	1	0	0	0	26	2
Salford City	2022–23	League Two	32	11	0	0	1	0	4 (Note: Two appearances in EFL League Two Play-Offs)	0	37	11
Salford City	2023–24	League Two	38	6	2	0	3	0	2	1	45	7
Salford City	2024–25	League Two	27	1	2	0	1	0	3	1	33	2
Salford City	Total		121	20	5	0	6	0	9	2	141	22
Harrogate Town	2025–26	League Two	21	3	0	0	1	0	5	0	27	3
Career total			309	66	15	2	14	1	25	6	363	75

== Honours ==
Wigan Athletic

- Football League One: 2015–16

Individual

- EFL League One Player of the Month: January 2023
