= Ashley Eastham =

English association football player (born 1991)

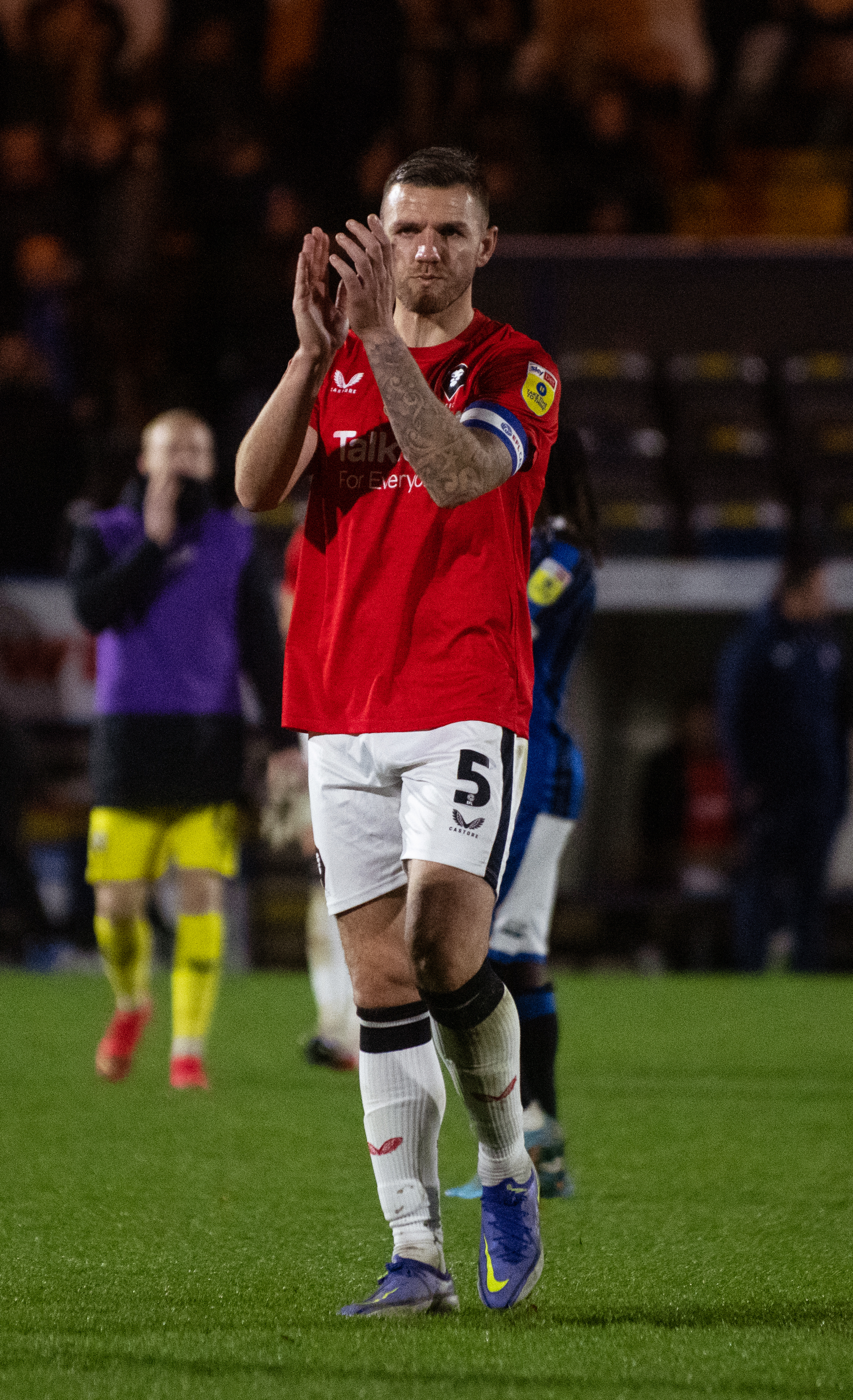

Personal information
- Full name: Ashley Martin Eastham
- Date of birth: 22 March 1991 (age 35)
- Place of birth: Preston, England
- Height: 6 ft 3 in (1.91 m)
- Position: Defender

Youth career
- 200?–2009: Blackpool

Senior career*
Years	Team	Apps	(Gls)
2009–2013	Blackpool	1	(0)
2009	→ Hyde United (loan)	11	(1)
2009–2010	→ Cheltenham Town (loan)	20	(0)
2010–2011	→ Carlisle United (loan)	0	(0)
2011	→ Cheltenham Town (loan)	9	(0)
2011–2012	→ Bury (loan)	25	(2)
2012	→ Fleetwood Town (loan)	1	(0)
2012	→ Notts County (loan)	4	(0)
2013	→ Bury (loan)	19	(0)
2013–2016	Rochdale	76	(4)
2016–2020	Fleetwood Town	134	(7)
2020–2023	Salford City	80	(3)
Total		380	(17)
- * Club domestic league appearances and goals

Ashley Martin Eastham (born 22 March 1991) is an English former professional footballer who last played as a defender for League Two club Salford City.

Eastham began his career at Blackpool. He made only three appearances for Blackpool, but enjoyed his first run of senior football after moving on loan to Cheltenham Town midway through the 2009–10 season. Loan spells with Carlisle United and Cheltenham Town again followed in 2010–11, before Eastham spent the whole of the next season helping Bury to a mid-table finish in League One. Brief stints at Fleetwood Town and Notts County gave Eastham more experience in 2012, before he returned to Bury for their hapless fight against relegation from League One in 2012–13.

In 2013, Eastham made a permanent transfer to Rochdale, and in 2016, Eastham signed for Fleetwood Town, where he made over 150 appearances before signing for Salford. Having been made club captain, Eastham made almost 100 appearances over three years before departing.

== Club career ==
=== Early career at Blackpool; loan move to Hyde United ===
Born in Preston, Lancashire, Eastham is a product of the Blackpool youth system. He attended Carr Hill High School, Kirkham, Lancashire.

He signed his first professional contract in May 2009, then in July he played for the first team in the pre-season South West Challenge Cup held in North Devon, including playing in the 5–0 win over Barnstaple Town.

In August 2009 he joined Conference North side Hyde United on loan, making his debut on 8 August in a 1–0 win over Stafford Rangers at Ewen Fields. On 17 August he scored Hyde's second goal in a 3–2 home victory over Gainsborough Trinity. He made eleven league appearances for the Tigers, scoring one goal, before being recalled by Blackpool on 21 September.

=== Back at Blackpool – first-team debut ===
The following day, in his first year as a professional, Eastham made his debut for the Seasiders in a 4–3 defeat to Premier League side Stoke City at the Britannia Stadium in the third round of the 2009–10 League Cup.

"This is without doubt the biggest moment of my career. It was great to walk out and look at the surroundings. It is a fantastic atmosphere when you are on the pitch. I'll never forget my debut, and especially because of the type of game it was."

— Eastham talking about his Blackpool debut

At the end of the 2010–11 season, Eastham signed a new two-year contract with Blackpool. Four days later Eastham made his league debut, in a 2–0 home win over Peterborough United at Bloomfield Road, when he replaced the injured Neal Eardley in the 18th minute. On 11 August 2011, Eastham was sent off in Blackpool's League Cup tie against Sheffield Wednesday. At the end of the 2011–12 season, Eastham contract was activated after the club exercised their contract, until 2013. At the end of the 2012–13 season, Eastham was released by the club despite the club was keen to keep him, but Eastham wanted to leave the club, so he earn a first team place.

=== Cheltenham Town loan move ===
On 26 November 2009, Eastham joined League Two side Cheltenham Town on an initial one-month loan deal until 2 January 2010. Blackpool manager Ian Holloway said of the move: "This is a great move for Ash. It is another step up for him, he did extremely well when he went to Hyde at the start of the season and this will be another challenge for him both on and off the field." The Robins caretaker manager John Schofield said: "It's great to have a bright young prospect from a Championship club made available to us. Hopefully we can offer him some first team experience for the next stage of his development as a player." Five days later he was an unused substitute in a 0–3 defeat to Torquay United at Plainmoor. His debut came on 5 December in a 2–2 draw with Northampton Town at Whaddon Road.

After four appearances, Eastham signed a one-month extension to the loan deal on 31 December. He made five appearances for the Robins, then on 7 January 2010 was recalled by Blackpool from his loan spell to cover for suspensions. He was included in the Blackpool squad that travelled to South Wales to take on Cardiff City on 9 January, and was an unused substitute in the game. On 15 January he returned to Cheltenham Town, on loan until the end of the season. Two days later he was sent off after receiving two yellow cards in a 0–0 draw with Grimsby Town at Blundell Park. He received a one-game suspension, missing the next game, a 1–4 home defeat to League Two leaders Rochdale. Following his performance in the 2–0 home win over Morecambe on 20 February 2010, he was named in the League Two "Team of the Week".

=== Loan spells at Carlisle United and Cheltenham Town ===
On 25 November 2010, Eastham joined League One side Carlisle United on loan, until 3 January 2011. He only made one appearance for the club, only in the FA Cup campaign, in a 3–2 win over Tamworth, playing 90 minutes. On 4 January 2011, Eastham then returned to the club, following his loan came to an end.

48 hours later, on 6 January 2011, Eastham joined Cheltenham Town on an initial one-month loan deal, for the second time in his career. Eastham's first game after signing for the club on a loan spell, for the second time in his career, came on 8 January 2011, in a 1–1 draw against Northampton Town. After his debut, Manager Mark Yates praised Eastham and Phil Walsh. Having made five appearances, his loan spell was extended for another month in February, followed up another loan spell extended for another month in March. On 4 April 2011, Eastham then returned to the club, following his loan came to an end.

=== Bury (loan) ===
Eastham joined Bury on 25 August 2011 for one month. He made his debut for the club, in a 2–1 loss against Charlton Athletic two days later. After the move, Eastham express "happy" with the loan move. His loan was extended a further two times and he remained at Gigg Lane until the end of the 2011–12 season. During the season, he played a pivotal part in Bury's League One campaign, including winning the Champagne Moment of the Season award for his 90th-minute equaliser as Bury fought back from 3–0 down to draw 3–3 with Huddersfield Town. At the end of the season, Eastham's loan spell with Bury came to an end.

=== Loan moves to Fleetwood Town, Notts County and Bury ===
On 29 August 2012, Eastham joined Blackpool's Fylde coast neighbours Fleetwood Town on a one-month loan deal, together with teammate Tom Barkhuizen who joined on loan for six months. His debut came six days later in the Football League Trophy, First round defeat to Rochdale at Spotland Stadium. Soon after, Eastham loan spell had ended despite Fleetwood Town's progress to extend his loan.

On 5 October, Eastham joined Notts County on loan following his Fleetwood Town loan spell came to an end. While at Notts County, Eastham made four appearances before returning to Blackpool.

On 21 January 2013, Eastham returned to Bury on loan for a second time, until the end of the season. Five days later, Eastham made his second debut for the club, in a 0–0 draw against Shrewsbury Town. Like his first spell at Bury, Eastham maintained his first team status. However, this season was overshadowed by financial problems, which led the club to their relegation.

=== Rochdale ===
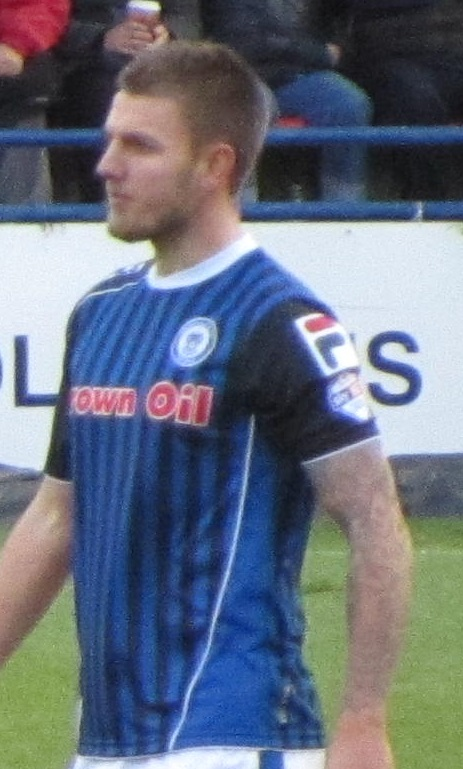
Eastham playing for Rochdale in 2013

On 20 June 2013, Ashley agreed a two-year deal with Rochdale following his release from Blackpool. By the time he was released by the club, Eastham attracted interests from host of clubs. Upon joining the club, Eastham was given number five shirt.

Eastham made his debut in the opening game of the season, in a 3–0 win over Hartlepool United. However, he find his first team opportunities limited in the defence and went on to make 15 appearances in his first season.

In his second season at Rochdale, Eastham was recalled to the starting line-up against Crewe Alexandra to make his first appearance of the season after stayed on the substitute bench for the first two matches. Eastham then scored his first goal of the season, in a 4–0 win over Walsall on 16 September 2014. Not only that, Eastham earned a place for the Football League's Team of the Week, as result of his performance. A week later, Eastham received a straight red card in the 30th minute, in a 3–2 win over Leyton Orient on 27 September 2014. Despite this, Eastham continued to be in the first team by the first half of the season and on 9 January 2015, Eastham signed a one-year contract extension with the club. Eastham later scored, in a 3–2 loss against Walsall on 10 February 2015. In his second season at Rochdale, which saw Eastham established himself in the first team, as well as, helping the club finish eighth place, he made forty-nine and scoring two times in all competitions.

=== Fleetwood Town ===
On 20 May 2016, Eastham joined fellow League One side Fleetwood Town from Rochdale, after signing a two-year deal. On the day of signing, Eastham said, "One of the biggest factors in me coming here was the ambition from the chairman and manager. I felt it was something I wanted to be a part of."

Having been named the club’s player of the season, Fleetwood exercised a one-year contract extension for him at the end of the 2017–18 season.

=== Salford City ===
On transfer deadline day, 31 January 2020 he joined Salford City. Eastham was immediately appointed team captain by then manager Graham Alexander.

In March 2021, Eastham captained Salford at Wembley as they beat League One side Portsmouth in the Football League Trophy final, the first major trophy in the club’s history.

In May 2022, Eastham signed a new one-year deal upon the expiry of his previous deal.

== Career statistics ==
As of match played 19 November 2022

Club	Season	League			FA Cup		League Cup		Other		Total	
Club	Season	Division	Apps	Goals	Apps	Goals	Apps	Goals	Apps	Goals	Apps	Goals
Blackpool	2009–10	Championship	1	0	0	0	1	0	---		2	0
Blackpool	2010–11	Premier League	0	0	0	0	0	0	---		0	0
Blackpool	2011–12	Championship	0	0	0	0	1	0	---		1	0
Blackpool	Total		1	0	0	0	2	0	0	0	3	0
Cheltenham Town (loan)	2009–10	League Two	20	0	0	0	0	0	0	0	20	0
Carlisle United (loan)	2010–11	League One	0	0	1	0	0	0	0	0	1	0
Cheltenham Town (loan)	2010–11	League Two	9	0	0	0	0	0	0	0	9	0
Bury (loan)	2011–12	League One	25	2	1	0	0	0	1 (Note: Appearance(s) in Football League Trophy)	0	27	2
Fleetwood Town (loan)	2012–13	League Two	1	0	0	0	0	0	1	0	2	0
Notts County (loan)	2012–13	League One	4	0	0	0	0	0	0	0	4	0
Bury (loan)	2012–13	League One	19	0	0	0	0	0	0	0	19	0
Rochdale	2013–14	League Two	15	0	3	0	1	0	1	0	20	0
Rochdale	2014–15	League One	41	2	6	0	0	0	2	0	49	2
Rochdale	2015–16	League One	20	2	1	0	1	0	2	0	24	2
Rochdale	Total		76	4	10	0	2	0	5	0	93	4
Fleetwood Town	2016–17	League One	35	2	2	0	1	0	5 (Note: Three appearances in EFL Trophy and two in League One play-offs)	0	43	2
Fleetwood Town	2017–18	League One	45	3	4	0	1	0	0	52	3	
Fleetwood Town	2018–19	League One	45	2	3	0	0	0	1 (Note: Appearance(s) in EFL Trophy)	0	49	2
Fleetwood Town	2019–20	League One	9	0	3	0	0	0	3	0	15	0
Fleetwood Town	Total		134	7	12	0	2	0	11	0	159	7
Salford City	2019–20	League Two	4	0	0	0	0	0	0	0	4	0
Salford City	2020–21	League Two	39	1	2	0	2	0	2	0	45	1
Salford City	2021–22	League Two	28	2	2	0	1	0	0	0	31	2
Salford City	2022–23	League Two	9	0	2	0	0	0	2	0	13	0
Salford City	Total		80	3	6	0	3	0	4	0	93	3
Career total			369	16	30	0	9	0	22	0	430	16

== Honours ==
Salford City

- EFL Trophy: 2019–20

Individual

- Fleetwood Town Player of the Year: 2017–18
