= Alex Reid (footballer, born 1995) =

English footballer

Personal information
- Full name: Alex Michael Reid
- Date of birth: 6 September 1995 (age 31)
- Place of birth: Birmingham, England
- Height: 6 ft 4 in (1.92 m)
- Position: Striker

Team information
- Current team: Barrow
- Number: 9

Youth career
- 2006–2013: Aston Villa
- 2013–2014: Walsall

Senior career*
Years	Team	Apps	(Gls)
2014	Ånge		
2015	Solihull Moors		
2015–2017	Rushall Olympic		
2017–2018	Fleetwood Town	0	(0)
2017	→ Wrexham (loan)	18	(3)
2018	→ Solihull Moors (loan)	15	(4)
2018–2020	Stevenage	11	(2)
2019	→ AFC Fylde (loan)	14	(2)
2019–2020	→ Ebbsfleet United (loan)	21	(5)
2020	→ Dagenham & Redbridge (loan)	6	(3)
2020–2022	Stockport County	54	(18)
2022	→ Solihull Moors (loan)	17	(7)
2022–2025	Oldham Athletic	35	(9)
2024–2025	→ Wealdstone (loan)	9	(7)
2025	→ Wealdstone (loan)	21	(9)
2025–2026	Hartlepool United	40	(12)
2026–	Barrow	0	(0)
- * Club domestic league appearances and goals as of 23:12, 25 April 2026 (UTC)

Alex Michael Reid (born 6 September 1995) is an English professional footballer who plays as a striker for National League club Barrow.

Reid began his career at Aston Villa's academy before becoming an apprentice at Walsall. He joined Swedish club Ånge IF in 2014, before returning to England to play for Solihull Moors in 2015. He then joined Rushall Olympic of the Northern Premier League and spent a year and a half there. Following a successful trial, Reid signed for League One club Fleetwood Town in January 2017. During his time at Fleetwood, he was loaned out to National League clubs in the form of Wrexham and former employers Solihull Moors throughout the 2017–18 season. Reid signed for Stevenage in July 2018. He spent the last three months of the 2018–19 season on loan at AFC Fylde and helped the club to win the FA Trophy during his time there.

== Career ==
=== Early career ===
Reid began his career at Aston Villa at the age of ten and remained at the club's academy until 2013. He subsequently joined Walsall's academy later that year and spent one year as an apprentice at the West Midlands club. Reid thought about quitting football after not being offered professional terms at Walsall, but instead took up the League Football Education's Player Placement Programme in Sweden, joining Ånge IF in 2014. He returned to England a year later and had spells at Solihull Moors and Rushall Olympic.

=== Fleetwood Town and loan spells ===
Having scored 14 times during the first half of the 2016–17 season for Rushall, Reid went on trial with League One club Fleetwood Town in December 2016. The trial period proved successful and he signed for Fleetwood for an undisclosed fee on 4 January 2017. Reid did not make any first-team appearances for Fleetwood during the remainder of the campaign, spending it with the club's development squad.

Reid joined Wrexham of the National League on a two-month loan deal on 15 August 2017. He made his Wrexham debut on the same day his signing was announced, coming on as a 59th-minute substitute and scoring the only goal of the game in a 1–0 home win over Gateshead. Having scored three times during the two-month loan spell, the deal was extended until 25 November 2017. He made 18 appearances during his time on loan at Wrexham, scoring three goals. On his return to his parent club, Reid made his Fleetwood debut in the EFL Trophy against Chesterfield on 5 December 2017, scoring the second goal in a 2–0 victory in what turned out to be his solitary first-team appearance for the club.

He was loaned out for a second time during the season, this time joining former club Solihull Moors of the National League. Reid signed for Solihull on 1 February 2018, on a loan deal that ran for the remainder of the 2017–18 campaign. He made his second debut for Solihull in a 1–0 away loss to Ebbsfleet United on 10 February 2018, before scoring his first goal of the loan spell a week later in a 3–2 comeback victory over Dover Athletic. Reid's second-half goal in Solihull's 2–1 away win against promotion-chasing Tranmere Rovers on 24 April 2018 meant that Solihull had guaranteed their place in the National League for another season. He scored four times in 15 appearances during the loan spell before returning to Fleetwood upon the conclusion of the season.

=== Stevenage ===
Whilst still contracted to Fleetwood, Reid went on trial at League Two club Stevenage in July 2018. He subsequently signed for Stevenage on a free transfer on 19 July 2018. Reid made his Stevenage debut in the club's opening match of the 2018–19 season, a 2–2 draw with Tranmere Rovers at Broadhall Way, playing the first 58 minutes of the match.

Reid joined National League club AFC Fylde on loan for the rest of the season on 8 February 2019. In August 2019 he moved on loan to Ebbsfleet United. He said he was looking forward to playing games and scoring goals for the club.

On 17 January 2020 he joined National League side Dagenham & Redbridge on loan until the end of the season. The season was ultimately cut short due to COVID-19 and Reid was released by Stevenage in the summer of 2020.

=== Stockport County ===
In July 2020, he signed a contract with National League side Stockport County. He returned to Solihull Moors on loan on 30 June 2022.

=== Oldham Athletic ===
He was released by Stockport in November 2022, signing for Oldham Athletic.

In October 2024, he joined fellow National League side Wealdstone on loan until 5 January 2025. Having initially returned to Oldham Athletic, featuring in three matches, he returned to Wealdstone on loan for the remainder of the season on 23 January. Reid scored a total of 20 goals across both loan spells, helping Wealdstone to stay up on the final day of the season and winning their Player of the Season award.

Following Oldham Athletic's promotion, Reid was released at the end of the 2024–25 season.

=== Hartlepool United ===
On 17 July 2025, Reid joined National League side Hartlepool United. He scored his first Hartlepool goal in his second appearance, a penalty in a 2–0 home win against Braintree Town. He was the club's top goalscorer in the 2025–26 season, scoring 12 times in 40 appearances. On 6 May 2026, the club announced he was being released.

=== Barrow ===
On 1 June 2026, Reid signed for recently relegated National League club Barrow on a two-year deal.

== Style of play ==
Reid was described as "strong and athletic", as well as "having an eye for goal" by Fleetwood Town development coach Paul Murray. Stevenage manager Dino Maamria called Reid a "pure athlete" and stated that "he will add pace to our forward-line".

== Career statistics ==
As of 25 April 2026

Appearances and goals by club, season and competition
Club	Season	League			FA Cup		League Cup		Other		Total	
Club	Season	Division	Apps	Goals	Apps	Goals	Apps	Goals	Apps	Goals	Apps	Goals
Fleetwood Town	2016–17	League One	0	0	0	0	0	0	0	0	0	0
Fleetwood Town	2017–18	League One	0	0	0	0	0	0	1 (Note: Appearance(s) in EFL Trophy)	1	1	1
Fleetwood Town	Total		0	0	0	0	0	0	1	1	1	1
Wrexham (loan)	2017–18	National League	18	3	—		—		—		18	3
Solihull Moors (loan)	2017–18	National League	15	4	—		—		—		15	4
Stevenage	2018–19	League Two	11	2	0	0	1	0	1	0	13	2
Stevenage	2019–20	League Two	0	0	—		0	0	0	0	0	0
Stevenage	Total		11	2	0	0	1	0	1	0	13	2
AFC Fylde (loan)	2018–19	National League	14	2	—		—		7 (Note: Four appearances and one goal in FA Trophy, three in National League play-offs)	1	21	3
Ebbsfleet United (loan)	2019–20	National League	21	5	3	2	—		1 (Note: Appearance(s) in FA Trophy)	1	25	8
Dagenham & Redbridge (loan)	2019–20	National League	6	3	—		—		—		6	3
Stockport County	2020–21	National League	37	16	4	2	—		2	2	43	20
Stockport County	2021–22	National League	13	1	2	0	—		3	2	18	3
Stockport County	2022–23	League Two	0	0	0	0	0	0	0	0	0	0
Stockport County	Total		50	17	6	2	0	0	5	4	61	23
Solihull Moors (loan)	2022–23	National League	17	7	3	1	—		0	0	20	8
Oldham Athletic	2022–23	National League	18	4	0	0	—		2	0	20	4
Oldham Athletic	2023–24	National League	12	5	2	0	—		0	0	14	5
Oldham Athletic	2024–25	National League	5	0	0	0	—		0	0	5	0
Oldham Athletic	Total		35	9	2	0	0	0	2	0	39	9
Wealdstone (loan)	2024–25	National League	9	7	3	4	—		1	0	13	11
Wealdstone (loan)	2024–25	National League	21	9	0	0	—		0	0	21	9
Hartlepool United	2025–26	National League	40	12	0	0	—		1	0	41	12
Career total			257	80	17	9	1	0	19	7	294	96

== Honours ==
AFC Fylde

- FA Trophy: 2018–19

Stockport County

- National League: 2021–22

Individual

- Wealdstone Player of the Year: 2024–25
