= Markus Schwabl =

German footballer (born 1990

Personal information
- Full name: Markus Josef Schawbl
- Date of birth: 26 August 1990 (age 36)
- Place of birth: Tegernsee, West Germany
- Height: 1.82 m (6 ft 0 in)
- Positions: Right-back; defensive midfielder

Team information
- Current team: SpVgg Unterhaching
- Number: 23

Youth career
- 1996–2001: FC Holzkirchen
- 2001–2008: SpVgg Unterhaching

Senior career*
Years	Team	Apps	(Gls)
2008–2011	SpVgg Unterhaching II	32	(2)
2009–2013	SpVgg Unterhaching	90	(2)
2013–2014	1860 Munich	4	(0)
2013–2014	1860 Munich II	8	(0)
2014–2015	SpVgg Unterhaching	28	(0)
2015–2017	VfR Aalen	55	(0)
2017–2018	Fleetwood Town	23	(0)
2018–	SpVgg Unterhaching	219	(3)
- * Club domestic league appearances and goals as of 28 June 2026

Markus Josef Schwabl (born 26 August 1990) is a German professional footballer who plays as a right-back or as a defensive midfielder for SpVgg Unterhaching.

== Career ==
On 28 August 2014, his contract with 1860 Munich was cancelled and he returned to 3. Liga side SpVgg Unterhaching after only a year.

On 20 January 2017, Schwabl signed for English League One side Fleetwood Town on a two-year contract for an undisclosed fee. Upon signing for Fleetwood, manager Uwe Rösler stated that he was 'very fit and very professional in his day to day work' and that 'he will offer us a lot of energy in midfield'. He made his debut for Fleetwood Town the following day as a substitute in a 1–0 victory away to Coventry City.

His contract was cancelled by Fleetwood Town at the end of the 2017–18 season.

On 2 July 2018, Schwabl returned to SpVgg Unterhaching and signed a three-year contract with the club.

== Personal life ==
He is the son of former West Germany international Manfred Schwabl.

== Career statistics ==
As of match played 25 September 2020

Appearances and goals by club, season and competition
Club	Season	League			National cup		League cup		Other		Total	
Club	Season	Division	Apps	Goals	Apps	Goals	Apps	Goals	Apps	Goals	Apps	Goals
SpVgg Unterhaching II	2008–09	Regionalliga Süd	8	0	—		—		0	0	8	0
SpVgg Unterhaching II	2009–10	Bayernliga	6	0	—		—		0	0	6	0
SpVgg Unterhaching II	2010–11	Bayernliga	16	2	—		—		0	0	16	2
SpVgg Unterhaching II	2011–12	Bayernliga	0	0	—		—		0	0	0	0
SpVgg Unterhaching II	2012–13	Bayernliga Süd	2	0	—		—		0	0	2	0
SpVgg Unterhaching II	Total		32	2	0	0	0	0	0	0	32	2
SpVgg Unterhaching	2009–10	3. Liga	17	0	0	0	—		0	0	17	0
SpVgg Unterhaching	2010–11	3. Liga	5	1	—		—		0	0	5	1
SpVgg Unterhaching	2011–12	3. Liga	32	0	2	0	—		0	0	34	0
SpVgg Unterhaching	2012–13	3. Liga	36	1	1	0	—		0	0	37	1
SpVgg Unterhaching	Total		90	2	3	0	0	0	0	0	93	2
1860 Munich	2013–14	2. Bundesliga	4	0	0	0	—		0	0	4	0
1860 Munich II	2013–14	Regionalliga Bayern	7	0	—		—		0	0	7	0
1860 Munich II	2014–15	Regionalliga Bayern	1	0	—		—		0	0	1	0
1860 Munich II	Total		8	0	0	0	0	0	0	0	8	0
SpVgg Unterhaching	2014–15	3. Liga	28	0	—		—		0	0	28	0
VfR Aalen	2015–16	3. Liga	37	0	1	0	—		0	0	38	0
VfR Aalen	2016–17	3. Liga	18	0	—		—		0	0	18	0
VfR Aalen	Total		55	0	1	0	0	0	0	0	56	0
Fleetwood Town	2016–17	League One	13	0	0	0	0	0	1 (Note: Appearance(s) in the League One play-offs)	0	14	0
Fleetwood Town	2017–18	League One	10	0	3	0	1	0	6 (Note: Appearance(s) in the EFL Trophy)	0	20	0
Fleetwood Town	Total		23	0	3	0	1	0	7	0	34	0
SpVgg Unterhaching	2018–19	3. Liga	31	0	—		—		0	0	31	0
SpVgg Unterhaching	2019–20	3. Liga	25	1	—		—		0	0	25	1
SpVgg Unterhaching	2020–21	3. Liga	2	0	—		—		0	0	2	0
SpVgg Unterhaching	Total		58	1	0	0	0	0	0	0	58	1
Career total			298	5	7	0	1	0	7	0	313	5

== Honours ==
SpVgg Unterhaching

- Regionalliga Bayern: 2022–23
