= Michael Donohue =

English footballer

Personal information
- Full name: Michael John Donohue
- Date of birth: 12 November 1997 (age 29)
- Place of birth: Warrington, England
- Height: 5 ft 10 in (1.78 m)
- Position: Midfielder

Team information
- Current team: FC United of Manchester

Youth career
- 2014–2015: Everton

Senior career*
Years	Team	Apps	(Gls)
2015–2017	Everton	0	(0)
2016	→ Barrow (loan)	6	(0)
2017–2019	Fleetwood Town	0	(0)
2018	→ Tamworth (loan)	7	(0)
2018–2019	→ FC United of Manchester (loan)	18	(0)
2019–	FC United of Manchester		
- * Club domestic league appearances and goals as of 09:17, 18 January 2019 (UTC)

Michael Donohue (born 12 November 1997) is an English professional footballer who plays for FC United of Manchester as a midfielder.

== Early life ==
Donohue was born in Warrington.

== Playing career ==
He began his career with Everton, moving on loan to Barrow in February 2016. He signed for Fleetwood Town in July 2017, making his senior debut for the club on 8 November 2017, in an EFL Trophy match against Carlisle United. He signed on loan for National League North side Tamworth on 16 March 2018, making his debut for the club the following day, as a 78th-minute substitute for Darryl Knights in a 1–1 home draw with Harrogate Town.

In September 2018 he joined FC United of Manchester on a short-term loan, playing his first match for the club on 3 September against Bradford Park Avenue.

On 17 January 2019 he joined F.C. United on a permanent deal after being released by Fleetwood.

== Career statistics ==
As of match played 1 January 2018

Appearances and goals by club, season and competition
Club	Season	League			FA Cup		League Cup		Other		Total	
Club	Season	Division	Apps	Goals	Apps	Goals	Apps	Goals	Apps	Goals	Apps	Goals
Barrow (loan)	2015–16	National League	6	0	0	0	—		0	0	6	0
Fleetwood Town	2017–18	League One	0	0	0	0	0	0	1 (Note: Appearance in the EFL Trophy)	0	1	0
Career total			6	0	0	0	0	0	1	0	7	0
