= Jordy Hiwula =

English footballer (born 1994)

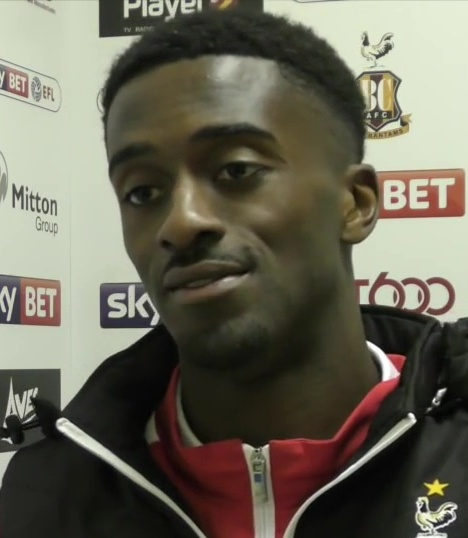

Personal information
- Full name: Jordy Hiwula-Mayifuila
- Date of birth: 21 September 1994 (age 32)
- Place of birth: Manchester, England
- Height: 5 ft 10 in (1.78 m)
- Position: Forward

Team information
- Current team: Gateshead

Youth career
- Fletcher Moss Rangers
- –2012: Manchester City

Senior career*
Years	Team	Apps	(Gls)
2012–2015	Manchester City	0	(0)
2014	→ Yeovil Town (loan)	8	(0)
2015	→ Walsall (loan)	19	(9)
2015–2018	Huddersfield Town	0	(0)
2015–2016	→ Wigan Athletic (loan)	14	(2)
2016	→ Walsall (loan)	13	(3)
2016–2017	→ Bradford City (loan)	41	(9)
2017–2018	→ Fleetwood Town (loan)	43	(8)
2018–2020	Coventry City	54	(14)
2020–2021	Portsmouth	9	(0)
2021–2022	Doncaster Rovers	20	(1)
2022–2023	Ross County	21	(1)
2024	Morecambe	9	(0)
2025–2026	Boston United	39	(7)
2026–	Gateshead	0	(0)

International career^{‡}
2011–2012	England U18	2	(1)
2012	England U19	2	(1)
- * Club domestic league appearances and goals as of 14:07, 5 September 2026 (UTC) ‡ National team caps and goals as of 15:03, 17 July 2015 (UTC)

Jordy Hiwula-Mayifuila (born 21 September 1994) is an English professional footballer who plays as a striker for National League club Gateshead. He also represented the England U19 side.

== Club career ==
Hiwula joined a local club, Fletcher Moss Rangers, from there he went onto Manchester City. After missing most of the 2012–13 season with a serious ligament injury Hiwula scored 20 goals in 31 games for Manchester City's Under-21 side in the 2013–14 season. As a result, Hiwula extended his contract, on a two-year deal, keeping him until 2016.

=== Loan spells ===
On 2 October 2014, he joined Yeovil Town on loan until 5 January 2015. He made his professional debut on 4 October in Yeovil's 2–0 defeat against Milton Keynes Dons. On 8 November 2014, Hiwula scored his first goal for Yeovil with the only goal of the game in the FA Cup first round against Crawley Town. Hiwula returned to Manchester City, on 25 November 2014, having only scored one goal in his nine appearances in his time at Yeovil.

On 2 February 2015, Hiwula signed for League One side Walsall on an initial one-month youth loan. He scored three minutes into his debut for the Saddlers after coming on 66 minutes in to a 2–0 away win against Doncaster Rovers on 7 February 2015. His second goal came just three days later, on his home début against Rochdale, where he scored what turned out to be the winner to put Walsall 3–0 up in an eventual 3–2 win. After scoring three times in six appearances, Hiwula's loan spell was extended for another month. Hiwula scored his fourth goal on 3 March 2015, in a 1–0 win against his former club Yeovil Town. Hiwula played in the final of the Football League Trophy at Wembley, coming on as a substitute for Tom Bradshaw in the 62nd minute in a 2–0 loss against Bristol City. Hiwula's loan spell with Walsall was extended until the end of the season. Hiwula went on to score five more goals in the 2014/15 season, including braces against Crawley Town and Bristol City.

=== Huddersfield Town ===
On 17 July 2015, Hiwula signed for Championship side Huddersfield Town on a three-year contract for an undisclosed fee. After being an un-used substitute in the opening game of the season against Hull City, Hiwula made his Huddersfield Town debut, coming on as a substitute for Tommy Smith in the 65th minute of a 2–1 loss against Notts County in the first round of League Cup.

==== Wigan Athletic (loan) ====
On 27 August 2015, Hiwula joined League One club Wigan Athletic on a season long loan, in a move which saw Emyr Huws move the other way on similar terms. On his second appearance for Wigan he scored a late winner against Chesterfield. On 1 February 2016, Hiwula was recalled early from his loan spell at Wigan.

==== Walsall (loan) ====
On 4 March 2016, it was announced that Hiwula had re-joined Walsall on loan until the end of the 2015–16 season.

==== Bradford City (loan) ====
He moved on a season long loan to Bradford City in July 2016.

==== Fleetwood Town (loan) ====
On 5 July 2017 Hiwula joined League One Fleetwood Town on loan for the 2017–18 season. He scored his first goal for Fleetwood in a 2-1 EFL Cup defeat against Carlisle United on 8 August 2017.

=== Coventry City ===
On 2 August 2018, Hiwula signed for League One club Coventry City on a two-year deal for an undisclosed fee. He scored his first goal against Forest Green Rovers in the EFL Trophy, a game which Coventry won on penalties following a 1–1 draw. His first league goal came on 20 October against Southend United. He scored in the next two games, helping Coventry to beat Bradford City and Doncaster Rovers.

=== Portsmouth ===
In October 2020, Hiwula signed on a short-term deal for Portsmouth after being released by Coventry City at the end of last season. He scored his first goal for Portsmouth in a 6–1 FA Cup win against King's Lynn Town on 28 November 2020. On 6 January 2021, Hiwula signed a contract extension to remain at the club until the end of the 2020–21 season.

=== Doncaster Rovers ===
On 10 July 2021, Hiwula joined League One side Doncaster Rovers on a two-year deal.

=== Ross County ===
On 28 June 2022, Hiwula joined Scottish Premiership side Ross County for a nominal fee, signing a two-year deal with the club. After scoring four goals in 27 appearances for the club, Hiwula was released by Ross County on 4 September 2023.

=== Morecambe ===
On 22 February 2024, Hiwula joined League Two club Morecambe on a short-term contract until the end of the season.

=== Boston United ===
On 12 August 2025, over one year after his departure from Morecambe, Hiwula joined National League club Boston United.

Following the conclusion of the 2025–26 season, the club announced that they were in talks with Hiwula regarding his future with the club.

=== Gateshead ===
On 4 September 2026, Hiwula joined National League club Gateshead on a one-year deal.

== International career ==
Hiwula has represented England at U18 level, scoring once in a 3–0 win against Poland, and at U19 level, where he scored on his debut against Estonia.

== Personal life ==
Hiwula was born in England and is of Congolese descent. Hiwula is a Manchester United fan.

== Career statistics ==
As of end of 2025–26 season

Appearances and goals by club, season and competition
Club	Season	League			Cup		League Cup		Other		Total	
Club	Season	Division	Apps	Goals	Apps	Goals	Apps	Goals	Apps	Goals	Apps	Goals
Manchester City	2014–15	Premier League	0	0	0	0	0	0	0	0	0	0
Yeovil Town (loan)	2014–15	League One	8	0	1	1	0	0	0	0	9	1
Walsall (loan)	2014–15	League One	19	9	—		0	0	1 (Note: Appearances in Football League Trophy)	0	20	9
Huddersfield Town	2015–16	Championship	0	0	0	0	1	0	—		1	0
Huddersfield Town	2016–17	Championship	0	0	0	0	0	0	—		0	0
Huddersfield Town	2017–18	Premier League	0	0	0	0	0	0	—		0	0
Huddersfield Town	Total		0	0	0	0	1	0	—		1	0
Wigan Athletic (loan)	2015–16	League One	14	2	0	0	0	0	2	4	16	6
Walsall (loan)	2015–16	League One	13	3	0	0	0	0	2 (Note: Appearances in League One play-offs)	0	15	3
Bradford City (loan)	2016–17	League One	41	9	1	0	1	0	6 (Note: Appearances in EFL Trophy and League One play-offs)	3	49	12
Fleetwood Town (loan)	2017–18	League One	43	8	4	0	1	1	5 (Note: Appearances in EFL Trophy)	3	53	12
Coventry City	2018–19	League One	39	12	1	0	1	0	2	1	43	13
Coventry City	2019–20	League One	15	2	0	0	2	2	1	0	18	4
Coventry City	Total		54	14	1	0	3	2	3	1	61	17
Portsmouth	2020–21	League One	9	0	2	1	0	0	4	2	15	3
Doncaster Rovers	2021–22	League One	20	1	2	0	0	0	3	0	25	1
Ross County	2022–23	Scottish Premiership	21	1	1	0	5	3	—		27	4
Morecambe	2023–24	League Two	9	0	0	0	0	0	0	0	9	0
Boston United	2025–26	National League	39	7	1	0	—		1 (Note: Appearance(s) in FA Trophy)	0	41	7
Career total			293	55	13	2	11	6	27	13	341	76

== Honours ==
Walsall

- Football League Trophy runner-up: 2014–15

Coventry City

- EFL League One: 2019–20

Portsmouth

- EFL Trophy runner-up: 2019–20
