= 2017–18 Fleetwood Town F.C. season =

Fleetwood Town F.C.
2017–18 season
- Chairman: Andy Pilley
- Head Coach: Uwe Rosler (till 16 February); John Sheridan (from 22 February 2018)
- Stadium: Highbury Stadium
- League One: 14th
- FA Cup: Third round
- EFL Cup: First round
- EFL Trophy: Fourth round
Home colours	Away colours

The 2017–18 season will be Fleetwood Town's 110th season in their history and fourth consecutive season in League One. Along with League One, the club will also participate in the FA Cup, EFL Cup and EFL Trophy.

The season covers the period from 1 July 2017 to 30 June 2018.

== Transfers ==
=== Transfers in ===
Date from	Position	Nationality	Name	From	Fee	Ref.
1 July 2017	CM	(England)	Kyle Dempsey	Huddersfield Town	Undisclosed	
1 July 2017	CF	(England)	Conor McAleny	Everton	Free	
1 July 2017	RB	(England)	Harvey Rodgers	Hull City	Free	
4 July 2017	MF	(England)	Harrison Biggins	Stocksbridge Park Steels	Undisclosed	
5 July 2017	RW	(England)	Michael Donohue	Everton	Free	
18 July 2017	LB	(England)	Luke Higham	Blackpool	Free	
19 September 2017	CM	(United States)	Sebastien Des Pres	Blackpool	Free	
2 January 2018	FW	(Republic of Ireland)	Paddy Madden	Scunthorpe United	Undisclosed	
5 January 2018	DF	(Australia)	Gethin Jones	Everton	Undisclosed	
7 January 2018	MF	(France)	Toumani Diagouraga	Plymouth Argyle	Free	
31 January 2018	FW	(Brazil)	João Morelli	Middlesbrough	Free	

=== Transfers out ===
Date from	Position	Nationality	Name	To	Fee	Ref.
1 July 2017	CF	(England)	David Ball	Rotherham United	Rejected contract	(Note: David Ball joined Rotherham United after rejecting a new contract.)
1 July 2017	CB	(England)	Joe Davis	Port Vale	Free	
1 July 2017	RB	(Northern Ireland)	Conor McLaughlin	Millwall	Rejected contract	(Note: Conor McLaughlin joined Millwall following his release.)
1 July 2017	CF	(Scotland)	Declan McManus	Dunfermline Athletic	Released	(Note: Declan McManus joined Dunfermline Athletic following his release.)
1 July 2017	LB	(England)	Spencer Myers	Free agent	Released	
1 July 2017	DM	(England)	Oliver Roberts	Free agent	Released	
1 July 2017	CM	(Republic of Ireland)	Jimmy Ryan	Blackpool	Rejected contract	(Note: Jimmy Ryan joined Blackpool after rejecting a new contract.)
1 July 2017	LM	(England)	Martyn Woolford	Grimsby Town	Released	(Note: Martyn Woolford joined Grimsby Town following his release.)
5 August 2017	RB	(England)	Michael Duckworth	FC Halifax Town	Free	
3 January 2018	CM	(England)	Akil Wright	Wrexham	Undisclosed	
12 January 2018	FW	(Northern Ireland)	Dion Charles	Southport	Undisclosed	
12 January 2018	MF	(England)	Elliot Osborne	Southport	Undisclosed	
18 January 2018	MF	(England)	Nick Haughton	Salford City	Undisclosed	
19 January 2018	DF	(Jamaica)	Amari'i Bell	Blackburn Rovers	Undisclosed	
26 January 2018	DF	(Nigeria)	Godswill Ekpolo	Mérida AD	Undisclosed	
31 January 2018	DF	(England)	Harvey Rodgers	Accrington Stanley	Undisclosed	
31 January 2018	FW	(England)	Devante Cole	Wigan Athletic	Undisclosed	

=== Loans in ===
Date from	Position	Nationality	Name	From	Date until	Ref.
4 July 2017	RB	(England)	Lewie Coyle	Leeds United	30 June 2018	
5 July 2017	CF	(England)	Jordy Hiwula	Huddersfield Town	31 May 2018	
1 August 2017	CM	(Australia)	Aiden O'Neill	Burnley	30 June 2018	
17 August 2017	CB	(England)	Baily Cargill	AFC Bournemouth	30 June 2018	
25 January 2018	DF	(Republic of Ireland)	Kevin O'Connor	Preston North End	End of season	
31 January 2018	DF	(England)	Charlie Oliver	Manchester City	End of season	

=== Loans out ===
Date from	Position	Nationality	Name	To	Date until	Ref.
1 July 2017	AM	(Netherlands)	Ricardo Kip	Cambuur	End of season	
17 July 2017	CM	(England)	Akil Wright	Wrexham	3 January 2018	
22 July 2017	ST	(Northern Ireland)	Dion Charles	FC Halifax Town	4 January 2018	
4 August 2017	GK	(England)	Matthew Urwin	Chorley	End of season	
7 August 2017	FW	(England)	Gerard Garner	Southport	4 September 2017	
9 August 2017	CM	(England)	Elliot Osborne	Morecambe	7 January 2018	
15 August 2017	CF	(England)	Alex Reid	Wrexham	25 November 2017	
31 August 2017	CM	(England)	Nick Haughton	Chorley	15 January 2018	
5 September 2017	CB	(England)	Nathan Sheron	Chester	3 October 2017	
4 November 2017	FW	(England)	Gerard Garner	Bamber Bridge	2 December 2017	
8 December 2017	CB	(England)	Nathan Sheron	Southport	4 January 2018	
13 December 2017	FW	(Wales)	Dan Mooney	Chorley	10 January 2018	
31 January 2018	FW	(England)	Ashley Nadesan	Carlisle United	End of season	
1 February 2018	FW	(England)	Alex Reid	Solihull Moors	End of season	
2 February 2018	DF	(France)	Victor Nirennold	Guiseley	End of season	
15 February 2018	DF	(England)	Luke Higham	F.C. United of Manchester	12 March 2018	
15 February 2018	DF	(England)	Harrison Holgate	Stalybridge Celtic	End of season	
16 March 2018	MF	(England)	Michael Donohue	Tamworth	End of season	
8 March 2018	FW	(England)	Gerard Garner	F.C. United of Manchester	End of season	

== Competitions ==
=== Friendlies ===
As of 9 June 2017, Fleetwood Town have confirmed five pre-season friendlies against Preston North End, Queen of the South, Bolton Wanderers, Tranmere Rovers, and Karlsruher SC.

7 July 2017	Fleetwood Town	1–0	Queen of the South	Thornton
15:00 BST	Coyle 62'	Report		Stadium: Poolfoot Farm Training Complex

11 July 2017	Karlsruher SC	2–1	Fleetwood Town	TBA, Austria
14:00 CEST	Hoffmann 4'; Bülow 9'	Report	Cole 18'	Stadium: TBC

15 July 2017	FK Jablonec	1–2	Fleetwood Town	Kossen, Austria
18:00 CEST	Hanousek 68'	Report	Hunter 88'; Maguire 90'	Stadium: TBC

22 July 2017	Fleetwood Town	2–0	Bolton Wanderers	Fleetwood
15:00 BST	Hiwula 18'; McAleny 71'	Report		Stadium: Highbury Stadium; Attendance: 2,541

25 July 2017	Tranmere Rovers	3–1	Fleetwood Town	Birkenhead
19:30 BST	Norwood 7', 51'; Buxton 72'	Report	Sowerby 70'	Stadium: Prenton Park

28 July 2017	Fleetwood Town	1–5	Preston North End	Fleetwood
19:30 BST	Bolger 16'	Report	Huntington 45+2'; Barkhuizen 54'; Johnson 72' (pen.); Horgan 75'; Coyle 84' (o.g.)	Stadium: Highbury Stadium

=== League One ===
==== League table ====
Pos	Team	Pld	W	D	L	GF	GA	GD	Pts
12	Blackpool	46	15	15	16	60	55	+5	60
13	Bristol Rovers	46	16	11	19	60	66	−6	59
14	Fleetwood Town	46	16	9	21	59	68	−9	57
15	Doncaster Rovers	46	13	17	16	52	52	0	56
16	Oxford United	46	15	11	20	61	66	−5	56

Source: BBC Sport
Rules for classification: 1) Points; 2) Goal difference; 3) Number of goals scored

==== Result summary ====
Overall								Home						Away					
Pld	W	D	L	GF	GA	GD	Pts	W	D	L	GF	GA	GD	W	D	L	GF	GA	GD
27	10	6	11	38	41	−3	36	4	4	5	19	20	−1	6	2	6	19	21	−2

Last updated: 13 January 2018.

==== Results by matchday ====
Matchday	1	2	3	4	5	6	7	8	9	10	11	12	13	14	15	16	17	18	19	20	21	22	23	24	25	26	27	28	29	30
Ground	H	A	H	A	H	H	A	H	A	H	A	H	A	A	H	A	A	H	A	H	A	H	H	A	A	H	A	H	A	H
Result	W	W	W	L	D	W	L	L	W	L	W	D	D	L	W	D	L	D	L	D	L	L	L	W	W	L	W			
Position	1	4	3	5	9	7	7	10	9	11	9	9	9	11	9	8	8	9	12	11	14	14	14	11	11	11	11			

Updated to match(es) played on 13 January 2018. Source: Statto.com
A = Away; H = Home; W = Win; D = Draw; L = Loss

==== Matches ====
On 21 June 2017, the league fixtures were announced.

5 August 2017 1	Fleetwood Town	2–0	Rotherham United	Fleetwood
15:00 BST	McAleny 16', 66'; Dempsey (yellow card) 80'; Bolger (yellow card) 84'	Report	Vaulks (yellow card) 42'	Stadium: Highbury Stadium; Attendance: 3,623; Referee: Robert Lewis

12 August 2017 2	Northampton Town	0–1	Fleetwood Town	Northampton
15:00 BST		Report	Cole 75'	Stadium: Sixfields Stadium; Attendance: 5,124; Referee: Brett Huxtable

19 August 2017 3	Fleetwood Town	2–0	AFC Wimbledon	Fleetwood
15:00 BST	Cole 19', 57'; Eastham (yellow card) 59'; Hiwula (yellow card) 78'	Report	Robinson (yellow card) 49'	Stadium: Highbury Stadium; Attendance: 2,730; Referee: John Brooks

26 August 2017 4	Bristol Rovers	3–1	Fleetwood Town	Horfield
15:00 BST	Sinclair 26'; Bodin 43'; Clarke (yellow card) 54'; Harrison 79'	Report	Cole 60'	Stadium: Memorial Stadium; Attendance: 8,363; Referee: John Busby

3 September 2017 P	Blackburn Rovers	v	Fleetwood Town	Blackburn
12:15 BST				Stadium: Ewood Park
Note: On 23 August 2017, it was announced the scheduled fixture against Blackburn Rovers was to be rearranged due to Rovers' players being called up for international action.

9 September 2017 5	Fleetwood Town	2–2	Oldham Athletic	Fleetwood
15:00 BST	Eastham 24'; Coyle (yellow card) 77'; Hunter 90+3' (pen.)	Report	Edmundson (yellow card) 10'; Davies 18'; Byrne (yellow card) 50'; Bryan 55'; Ruddy (yellow card) 90+3'	Stadium: Highbury Stadium; Attendance: 3,606; Referee: Robert Jones

12 September 2017 6	Fleetwood Town	3–2	Bury	Fleetwood
19:45 BST	Hiwula 22', 28'; Sowerby (yellow card) 36'; Hunter 66'; Burns (yellow card) 90+6'	Report	Ince (yellow card) 29'; Beckford 31' (yellow card) 90+6'; Laurent 44'	Stadium: Highbury Stadium; Attendance: 2,535; Referee: Darren England

16 September 2017 7	Portsmouth	4–1	Fleetwood Town	Portsmouth
15:00 BST	Pitman 41', 78'; Lowe 57', 70'	Report	Bolger (yellow card) 34'; Cole 52'; Dempsey (yellow card) 66' (yellow-red card) 85'	Stadium: Fratton Park; Attendance: 17,192; Referee: Dean Whitestone

23 September 2017 8	Fleetwood Town	2–4	Southend United	Fleetwood
15:00 BST	Bell 4'; O'Neill (red card) 31'; Pond (yellow card) 44'; Cole 90+1'	Report	Cox 2'; McLaughlin 40'; Ranger 45' (pen.); McGlashan 87'	Stadium: Highbury Stadium; Attendance: 2,874; Referee: Carl Boyeson

26 September 2017 9	Bradford City	0–3	Fleetwood Town	Bradford
19:45 BST	Knight-Percival (yellow card) 29'; Doyle (yellow card) 54'	Report	Hiwula 51'; Cole 56'; Hunter 70'	Stadium: Valley Parade; Attendance: 18,799; Referee: Graham Salisbury

30 September 2017 10	Fleetwood Town	1–3	Charlton Athletic	Fleetwood
15:00 BST	Grant 25' (yellow card) 55'; Eastham (yellow card) 38'; Hunter (yellow card) 76'	Report	Fosu 13', 39', 71'	Stadium: Highbury Stadium; Attendance: 3,009; Referee: Seb Stockbridge

7 October 2017 11	Plymouth Argyle	1–2	Fleetwood Town	Plymouth
15:00 BST	Fletcher 90+5'	Report	Glendon (yellow card) 43'; Pond (yellow card) 62'; Hiwula 64'; Bolger (yellow card) 72'; Dempsey (yellow card) 75'; Bell 90+3'	Stadium: Home Park; Attendance: 8,064; Referee: Craig Hicks

14 October 2017 12	Fleetwood Town	2–2	Rochdale	Fleetwood
15:00 BST	Eastham 25'; Burns (red card) 65'; Cole 83'	Report	Inman 48'; Henderson 53'	Stadium: Highbury Stadium; Attendance: 3,260; Referee: John Brooks

17 October 2017 13	Scunthorpe United	1–1	Fleetwood Town	Scunthorpe
19:45 BST	Novak 18'	Report	Bolger (yellow card) 35'; Hiwula 85'	Stadium: Glanford Park; Attendance: 3,120; Referee: Peter Bankes

21 October 2017 14	Shrewsbury Town	1–0	Fleetwood Town	Shrewsbury
15:00 BST	Nsiala 89'	Report	Cargill (yellow card) 40'; Coyle (yellow card) 69'	Stadium: New Meadow; Attendance: 5,989; Referee: Nick Kinseley

28 October 2017 15	Fleetwood Town	2–0	Oxford United	Fleetwood
15:00 BST	Grant 88'; Hiwula 90+3'	Report		Stadium: Highbury Stadium; Attendance: 3,261; Referee: Trevor Kettle

31 October 2017 16	Blackburn Rovers	2–2	Fleetwood Town	Blackburn
19:45 GMT	Smallwood (yellow card) 44'; Dack 53'; Nuttall 77'; Williams (yellow card) 88'	Report	O'Neill 64' (yellow card) 68'; Burns 82'	Stadium: Ewood Park; Attendance: 10,399; Referee: Darren Drysdale

11 November 2017 17	Milton Keynes Dons	1–0	Fleetwood Town	Denbigh
15:00 GMT	Aneke 43'; Pawlett (yellow card) 57'; Ebanks-Landell (yellow card) 70'; Nesbitt (yellow card) 90+6'	Report	Bolger (yellow card) 76'	Stadium: Stadium mk Attendance: 7,827; Referee: Brett Huxtable

18 November 2017 18	Fleetwood Town	0–0	Doncaster Rovers	Fleetwood
15:00 GMT	Bolger (yellow card) 66'	Report	Baudry (yellow card) 67'	Stadium: Highbury Stadium; Attendance: 3,181; Referee: John Busby

21 November 2017 19	Walsall	4–2	Fleetwood Town	Bescot
19:45 GMT	Oztumer 25'; Ismail 45'; Roberts 89'; Agyei 90'	Report	Hiwula 21'; Hunter (yellow card) 57'; Bell 61'	Stadium: Bescot Stadium; Attendance: 3,225; Referee: Darren Handley

25 November 2017 20	Fleetwood Town	0–0	Blackpool	Fleetwood
15:00 GMT	Bolger (yellow card) 90+1'	Report		Stadium: Highbury Stadium; Attendance: 5,035; Referee: Oliver Langford

9 December 2017 21	Wigan Athletic	2–0	Fleetwood Town	Wigan
15:00 GMT	Powell 7'; Burn 38'	Report	Schwabl (yellow card) 31'; Dempsey (yellow card) 37'; Biggins (yellow card) 84'	Stadium: DW Stadium; Attendance: 8,879; Referee: Andy Haines

17 December 2017 22	Fleetwood Town	2–3	Peterborough United	Fleetwood
15:00 GMT	Bell 29'; O'Neill (yellow card) 39'; Bolger 82'	Report	Doughty 55'; Marriott 88'; Lloyd 90' (yellow card) 90+3'	Stadium: Highbury Stadium; Attendance: 2,273; Referee: (England) Anthony Backhouse

22 December 2017 23	Fleetwood Town	0–2	Gillingham	Fleetwood
19:00 GMT	Cargill (yellow card) 26'	Report	Parker 2'; O'Neill 15'	Stadium: Highbury Stadium; Attendance: 2,088 (85 Away); Referee: (England) David Webb

26 December 2017 24	Oldham Athletic	1–2	Fleetwood Town	Oldham
15:00 GMT	Bryan 82'	Report	Cole 50' (yellow card) 75'; Hunter 67'; Eastham (yellow card) 80'; Bell (yellow card) 90+3'	Stadium: Boundary Park; Attendance: 4,578; Referee: (England) Mark Heywood

30 December 2017 25	Bury	0–2	Fleetwood Town	Bury
15:00 GMT	Dawson (yellow card) 38'	Report	Hunter 24'; Cole 47'; Dempsey (yellow card) 68'	Stadium: Gigg Lane; Attendance: 3,158 (242 Away); Referee: (England) Dean Whitestone

1 January 2018 26	Fleetwood Town	1–2	Bradford City	Fleetwood
15:00 GMT	Sowerby 21'; Hunter (yellow card) 60'; Bell (yellow card) 76'; Neal (yellow card) 90+2'	Report	Gilliead 56'; McCartan 63' (yellow card) 64'	Stadium: Highbury Stadium; Attendance: 3,089 (1,085 Away); Referee: (England) Andy Haines

13 January 2018 27	Southend United	1–2	Fleetwood Town	Southend-on-Sea
15:00 GMT	Kightly 86'	Report	Diagouraga (yellow card) 53' (goal) 57'; Madden 62'; Coyle (yellow card) 78'	Stadium: Roots Hall; Attendance: 6,489 (45 Away); Referee: (England) Anthony Coggins

20 January 2018 28	Fleetwood Town	1–2	Blackburn Rovers	Fleetwood
15:00 GMT	McAleny 55'	Report	Dack 28'; Smallwood 83'	Stadium: Highbury Stadium; Attendance: 4,391; Referee: Andy Woolmer

27 January 2018 29	Gillingham	2–1	Fleetwood Town	Gillingham
15:00 GMT	Hessenthaler (yellow card) 40'; Eaves 53', 90+1' (pen.); Martin (yellow card) 67'	Report	Madden 13' (yellow card) 90+1'; Diagouraga (yellow card) 48'; Neal (yellow card) 85'; Bolger (yellow card) 87'	Stadium: MEMS Priestfield Stadium; Attendance: 6,332; Referee: Brett Huxtable

3 February 2018 30	Fleetwood Town	2–3	Scunthorpe United	Fleetwood
	Madden (yellow card) 30'; Eastham (red card) 42'; Hunter 45'; O'Connor (yellow card) 45+4'; Grant 67'; Pond (yellow card) 77'	Report	Morris 25', 42' (pen.); Toney 78'	Stadium: Highbury Stadium; Attendance: 2,901; Referee: Mark Heywood

10 February 2018 P	Rochdale	v	Fleetwood Town	Rochdale
15:00 GMT				Stadium: Spotland Stadium

13 February 2018 31	Fleetwood Town	1–2	Shrewsbury Town	Fleetwood
19:45 GMT	Madden 59'	Report	Whalley 45+3'; Thomas 82'	Stadium: Highbury Stadium; Attendance: 2,531; Referee: Ross Joyce

17 February 2018 32	Doncaster Rovers	3–0	Fleetwood Town	Doncaster
15:00 GMT	Kiwomya 13'; Anderson 27', 55'	Report	Diagouraga (yellow card) 54'; Dempsey (yellow card) 58'	Stadium: Keepmoat Stadium; Attendance: 7,013; Referee: Darren Drysdale

20 February 2018 33	Fleetwood Town	1–2	Portsmouth	Fleetwood
19:45 GMT	McAleny 81', (yellow card) 90+2'; Hunter (yellow card) 80'	Report	Lowe 24'; Hawkins 75'	Stadium: Highbury Stadium; Attendance: 2,561; Referee: David Webb

24 February 2018 34	Fleetwood Town	1–1	Milton Keynes Dons	Fleetwood
15:00 GMT	Hunter 54'; McAleny (yellow card) 90+4'	Report	Muirhead 20'	Stadium: Highbury Stadium; Attendance: 2,773 (80 Dons fans); Referee: Eddie Ilderton

10 March 2018 35	Fleetwood Town	1–1	Plymouth Argyle	Fleetwood
15:00 GMT	Coyle (yellow card) 24'; Madden 56'	Report	Makasi 16'; Fox (yellow card) 60'	Stadium: Highbury Stadium; Attendance: 3,079 (605 away); Referee: Darren Handley

17 March 2018 36	Charlton Athletic	0–0	Fleetwood Town	Charlton
15:00 GMT	Kaikai (yellow card) 81'	Report	Diagouraga (yellow card) 83'	Stadium: The Valley; Attendance: 9,865; Referee: Mark Heywood

20 March 2018 37	Rochdale	0–2	Fleetwood Town	Rochdale
19:45 GMT		Report	Madden (yellow card) 37' (goal) 63'; Hunter (yellow card) 38'; Hiwula 90'	Stadium: Spotland Stadium; Attendance: 2,403; Referee: Trevor Kettle

24 March 2018 38	Fleetwood Town	2–0	Northampton Town	Fleetwood
	Dempsey 18'; Sowerby (yellow card) 70'; Bolger 83'	Report	Luckassen (yellow card) 90+4'	Stadium: Highbury Stadium; Attendance: 3,049; Referee: Robert Lewis

30 March 2018 39	AFC Wimbledon	0–1	Fleetwood Town	Kingston upon Thames
15:00 BST	Soares (yellow card) 43'	Report	Sowerby 22'; Cairns (yellow card) 90+1'	Stadium: Kingsmeadow; Attendance: 4,378; Referee: Charles Breakspear

2 April 2018 40	Fleetwood Town	2–0	Bristol Rovers	Fleetwood
	Diagouraga (yellow card) 41'; Hunter 78'; Hiwula 89'	Report	Lines (yellow card) 55' (yellow-red card) 57'	Stadium: Highbury Stadium; Attendance: 2,890; Referee: Ross Joyce

7 April 2018 41	Rotherham United	3–2	Fleetwood Town	Rotherham
15:00 BST	Pond 12' (o.g.); Newell 51'; Wood 77'	Report	Eastham 5'; Bolger 54' (yellow card) 76'	Stadium: New York Stadium; Attendance: 7,562; Referee: Carl Boyeson

10 April 2018 42	Oxford United	0–1	Fleetwood Town	Oxford
19:45 BST		Report	McAleny 90+3'	Stadium: Kassam Stadium; Attendance: 6,337 (57 away); Referee: Brendan Malone

14 April 2018 43	Blackpool	2–1	Fleetwood Town	Blackpool
15:00 BST	Solomon-Otabor 88'; Gnanduillet 90+4'	Report	Jones (yellow card) 35'; Coyle (yellow card) 59'; Eastham (yellow card) 68'; Burns 75'	Stadium: Bloomfield Road; Attendance: 7,371; Referee: Andy Woolmer

21 April 2018 44	Fleetwood Town	0–4	Wigan Athletic	Fleetwood
15:00 BST	Hunter (yellow card) 53'	Report	Byrne (yellow card) 18'; Power 33'; Masey 37'; Burn 57'; Dunkley 66'	Stadium: Highbury Stadium; Attendance: 3,836; Referee: Dean Whitestone

28 April 2018 45	Peterborough United	2–0	Fleetwood Town	Peterborough
15:00 BST	Marriott 51'; Cooper 78'	Report		Stadium: London Road Stadium; Attendance: 4,667; Referee: Graham Horwood

5 May 2018 46	Fleetwood Town	2–0	Walsall	Fleetwood
17:30 BST	Hunter 31'; Madden 45'	Report	Bakayoko (yellow card) 25'; Roberts (yellow card) 76'	Stadium: Highbury Stadium; Attendance: 3,644; Referee: Kevin Johnson

=== FA Cup ===
On 16 October 2017, Fleetwood Town were drawn away to Chorley or Boston United in the first round. Chorley went on to win the replayed match to set up the first round tie. A home fixture against Hereford was confirmed for the second round.

6 November 2017 First round	Chorley	1–2	Fleetwood Town	Chorley
19:45 GMT	Carver 58' (yellow card) 70'	Report	Coyle (red card) 70'; Bolger (yellow card) 70'; Cole 77'; Sowerby 90+1'	Stadium: Victory Park; Attendance: 3,526; Referee: Peter Bankes

2 December 2017 Second round	Fleetwood Town	1–1	Hereford	Fleetwood
15:00 GMT	Cole 29'; Burns (yellow card) 40'; Dempsey (yellow card) 44'; O'Neill (yellow card) 82'	Report	Dinsley 23'; Preen (yellow card) 55'	Stadium: Highbury Stadium; Attendance: 2,567; Referee: Seb Stockbridge

14 December 2017 Second round replay	Hereford	0–2	Fleetwood Town	Fleetwood
19:45 GMT	Dinsley (yellow card) 17'	Report	Bolger 10', 58'; Eastham (yellow card) 64'	Stadium: Highbury Stadium; Attendance: 4,235; Referee: David Coote

6 January 2018 Third round	Fleetwood Town	0–0	Leicester City	Fleetwood
12:45 GMT		Report		Stadium: Highbury Stadium; Attendance: 5,001; Referee: (England) Simon Hooper

16 January 2018 Third round Reply	Leicester City	2–0	Fleetwood Town	Leicester
19:45 GMT	Iheanacho (yellow card) 17' (goal) 43' 77'; Benalouane (yellow card) 35'	Report	Glendon (yellow card) 45'; Dempsey (yellow card) 71'	Stadium: King Power Stadium; Attendance: 17,237; Referee: (England) Jonathan Moss (referee)

=== EFL Cup ===
On 16 June 2017, Fleetwood Town were drawn at home to Carlisle United in the first round.

8 August 2017 First round	Fleetwood Town	1–2 (a.e.t.)	Carlisle United	Fleetwood
19:45 BST	Jordy Hiwula 69'; Rodgers (red card)	Report	Miller 22', 101'	Stadium: Highbury Stadium; Attendance: 1,711; Referee: Graham Salisbury

=== EFL Trophy ===
On 12 July 2017, the group stage draw was completed with Fleetwood facing Carlisle United, Leicester City U23s and Morecambe in Northern Group A. After topping their ground, Fleetwood were handed a home tie against Chesterfield in the second round. An away trip to Bury was announced for the third round.

Pos	Lge	Team	Pld	W	PW	PL	L	GF	GA	GD	Pts	Qualification
1	L1	Fleetwood Town (Q)	3	3	0	0	0	7	2	+5	9	Round 2
2	ACA	Leicester City U21 (Q)	3	1	0	1	1	3	5	−2	4	Round 2
3	L2	Carlisle United (E)	3	1	0	0	2	3	3	0	3	
4	L2	Morecambe (E)	3	0	1	0	2	3	6	−3	2	

Updated to match(es) played on 8 November 2017. Source: EFL.com
(E) Eliminated; (Q) Qualified to the phase indicated

29 August 2017 Group Game 1	Fleetwood Town	3–0	Leicester City U23s	Fleetwood
19:45 BST	Ekpolo 27'; Cargill 60'; Burns 85'	Report		Stadium: Highbury Stadium; Attendance: 517

3 October 2017 Group Game 2	Fleetwood Town	2–1	Morecambe	Fleetwood
19:45 BST	Burns 25'; McGowan 72' (o.g.); Ekpolo (yellow card) 90+4'	Report	Ekpolo 51' (o.g.)	Stadium: Highbury Stadium; Attendance: 768; Referee: Eddie Ilderton

8 November 2017 Group Game 3	Carlisle United	1–2	Fleetwood Town	Carlisle
19:45 GMT	Devitt (yellow card) 33'; T. Miller (yellow card) 55'; S. Miller 86'	Report	Sowerby 10'; Biggins (yellow card) 29'; Burns 44'	Stadium: Brunton Park; Attendance: 909; Referee: Martin Coy

5 December 2017 Second round	Fleetwood Town	2–0	Chesterfield	Fleetwood
19:45 GMT	Sowerby 17'; Ekpolo (yellow card) 86'; Reid 88'	Report	Dennis (yellow card) 87'	Stadium: Highbury Stadium; Attendance: 372; Referee: Ross Joyce

9 January 2018 Third round	Bury	2–3	Fleetwood Town	Bury
19:30 GMT	Bunn 45+4'; Dai Wai-tsun 55'	Report	Hiwula 14' 50'; Grant 17' (pen.); Cargill (yellow card) 59'	Stadium: Gigg Lane; Attendance: 698; Referee: (England) Seb Stockbridge

6 February 2018 Fourth round	Yeovil Town	3–2	Fleetwood Town	Yeovil
19:45 GMT	Bolger 23' (o.g.); Whelan 56'; Zoko 90+1'	Report	Bolger 17'; McAleny (yellow card) 30'; Sowerby (yellow card) 45'; Schwabl (yellow card) 55'; Hiwula 80'	Stadium: Huish Park; Attendance: 1,314; Referee: Gavin Ward
