= 2023–24 Fleetwood Town F.C. season =

116th season in existence of Fleetwood Town FC

Fleetwood Town
2023–24 season
- Chairman: Steve Curwood
- Head Coach: Scott Brown (until 3 September); Lee Johnson (between 10 September – 30 December); Charlie Adam (from 31 December)
- Stadium: Highbury Stadium
- League One: 22nd (relegated)
- FA Cup: Second round
- EFL Cup: First round
- EFL Trophy: Group stage
Home colours

The 2023–24 season was the 116th season in the history of Fleetwood Town and their tenth consecutive season in League One. The club participated in League One, the FA Cup, the EFL Cup, and the 2023–24 EFL Trophy.

== Season squad ==
As of 22 February 2024

No.	Name	Position	Nationality	Place of birth	Date of birth (age)	Previous club	Date signed	Fee	Contract end
Goalkeepers
13	Jay Lynch	GK	(England)	Salford	31 March 1993 (age 33)	Rochdale	1 July 2022	Free	30 June 2025
23	David Harrington	GK	(Republic of Ireland)	Cork	1 July 2000 (age 26)	(Republic of Ireland) Cork City	5 January 2023	Undisclosed	30 June 2026
30	Stephen McMullan	GK	(Northern Ireland)		31 December 2004 (age 21)	(Northern Ireland) Warrenpoint Town	1 July 2022	Undisclosed	30 June 2024
34	Tom Donaghy	GK	(England)			Bradford City	15 May 2021	Undisclosed	30 June 2024
Defenders
2	Carl Johnston	RB	(Northern Ireland)	Belfast	29 May 2002 (age 24)	(Northern Ireland) Linfield	1 July 2018	Undisclosed	30 June 2025
3	Harry Boyes	LB	(England)	Barnsley	2 November 2001 (age 25)	Sheffield United	12 January 2024	Loan	31 May 2024
5	Bosun Lawal	CB	(Republic of Ireland)		30 May 2003 (age 23)	(Scotland) Celtic	17 August 2023	Loan	31 May 2024
6	Elijah Campbell	CB	(England)	Manchester	2 August 2004 (age 22)	Everton	1 February 2024	Loan	31 May 2024
12	Imari Samuels	LB	(England)		5 February 2003 (age 23)	Brighton & Hove Albion	1 February 2024	Loan	31 May 2024
16	Ben Heneghan	CB	(England)	Manchester	19 September 1993 (age 33)	Sheffield Wednesday	21 September 2023	Free	30 June 2024
18	Harrison Holgate	CB	(England)	Leeds	1 July 2000 (age 26)	Academy	1 July 2018	Trainee	30 June 2025
26	Shaun Rooney	RB	(Scotland)	Bellshill	26 July 1996 (age 30)	(Scotland) St Johnstone	1 July 2022	Free	30 June 2024
32	Finley Potter	CB	(England)		14 March 2004 (age 22)	Sheffield United	1 February 2024	Undisclosed	30 June 2025
38	Will Johnson	CB	(England)		5 June 2005 (age 21)	Academy	1 July 2023	Trainee	30 June 2024
Midfielders
4	Brendan Sarpong-Wiredu	CM	(England)	London	7 November 1999 (age 27)	Colchester United	1 July 2022	Undisclosed	30 June 2026
8	Gavin Kilkenny	CM	(Republic of Ireland)	Dublin	1 February 2000 (age 26)	Bournemouth	1 February 2024	Loan	31 May 2024
10	Danny Mayor	CM	(England)	Leyland	18 October 1990 (age 36)	Plymouth Argyle	1 July 2025	Free	30 June 2025
11	Ryan Broom	RM	(Wales)	Newport	4 September 1996 (age 30)	Cheltenham Town	1 July 2023	Free	30 June 2025
15	Junior Quitirna	AM	(Guinea-Bissau)		25 April 2000 (age 26)	(Republic of Ireland) Waterford	30 January 2023	Undisclosed	30 June 2026
17	Xavier Simons	DM	(England)	Hammersmith	20 February 2003 (age 23)	Hull City	1 September 2023	Loan	31 May 2024
22	Callum Dolan	AM	(England)	Manchester	29 September 2000 (age 26)	Warrington Rylands	6 January 2023	Undisclosed	30 June 2025
35	Pharrell Brown	AM	(England)	Manchester		Manchester United	11 July 2021	Free	30 June 2024
46	Theo Williams	RM	(England)		9 October 2003 (age 23)	Sheffield United	2 July 2023	Free	30 June 2025
47	Kyle White	CM	(England)	Burnley	25 March 2004 (age 22)	Academy	1 July 2023	Trainee	30 June 2025
Forwards
9	Jayden Stockley	CF	(England)	Poole	15 September 1993 (age 33)	Charlton Athletic	30 January 2023	Undisclosed	30 June 2025
14	Tommy Lonergan	CF	(Republic of Ireland)	Dunboyne	2 January 2004 (age 22)	(Republic of Ireland) St Patrick's Athletic	1 February 2024	Undisclosed	30 June 2026
19	Ryan Graydon	LW	(Republic of Ireland)	Dublin	11 April 1999 (age 27)	(Republic of Ireland) Derry City	12 July 2023	Undisclosed	30 June 2025
20	Promise Omochere	RW	(Republic of Ireland)	Dublin	18 October 2000 (age 26)	(Republic of Ireland) Bohemians	21 July 2022	Undisclosed	30 June 2024
33	Ronan Coughlan	CF	(Republic of Ireland)	Limerick	2 October 1996 (age 30)	(Republic of Ireland) Waterford	3 January 2024	Free	30 June 2025
36	Sam Glenfield	CF	(Northern Ireland)		10 May 2005 (age 21)	(Northern Ireland) Portadown	4 August 2022	Undisclosed	30 June 2025
44	Phoenix Patterson	LW	(Scotland)	(England) High Wycombe	1 September 2000 (age 26)	(Republic of Ireland) Waterford	1 January 2023	Undisclosed	30 June 2024
Out on Loan
21	Cian Hayes	RW	(Republic of Ireland)	(England) Preston	29 June 2003 (age 23)	Academy	13 November 2019	Trainee	30 June 2024
25	Connor Teale	CB	(England)	Harlow	8 October 2002 (age 24)	Leeds United	19 April 2021	Undisclosed	30 June 2024
27	Harvey Macadam	CM	(England)	Burnley	9 January 2001 (age 25)	Ashton United	2 January 2022	Undisclosed	30 June 2025
30	Barry Baggley	CM	(Northern Ireland)	Belfast	11 January 2002 (age 24)	(Northern Ireland) Glentoran	31 August 2018	Undisclosed	30 June 2024
50	Finlay Armstrong	LB	(England)	Liverpool	5 March 2003 (age 23)	Burnley	1 July 2023	Free	30 June 2024
51	Maleace Asamoah	RW	(England)	Oxford	15 November 2002 (age 23)	New Salamis	1 July 2023	Free	30 June 2024

== Transfers ==
=== In ===
Date	Pos	Player	Transferred from	Fee	Ref
14 June 2023	GK	(England) Patrick Boyes †	(England) Hartlepool United	Undisclosed	
1 July 2023	LB	(England) Finlay Armstrong †	(England) Burnley	Free Transfer	
1 July 2023	RW	(England) Maleace Asamoah †	(England) New Salamis	Free Transfer	
1 July 2023	RM	(Wales) Ryan Broom	(England) Cheltenham Town	Free Transfer	
1 July 2023	CF	(England) Sam Fishburn †	(England) Carlisle United	Free Transfer	
1 July 2023	CM	(England) Danny Mayor	(England) Plymouth Argyle	Free Transfer	
1 July 2023	RB	(England) Harry Wright †	(England) Everton	Free Transfer	
2 July 2023	RM	(England) Theo Williams †	(England) Sheffield United	Free Transfer	
12 July 2023	LW	(Republic of Ireland) Ryan Graydon	(Republic of Ireland) Derry City	Undisclosed	
21 September 2023	CB	(England) Ben Heneghan	Free agent	—N/a	
3 January 2024	CF	(Republic of Ireland) Ronan Coughlan	(Republic of Ireland) Waterford	Free Transfer	
8 January 2024	RM	(England) Owen Devonport	(England) Accrington Stanley	Free Transfer	
1 February 2024	CF	(Republic of Ireland) Tommy Lonergan	(Republic of Ireland) St Patrick's Athletic	Undisclosed	
1 February 2024	CB	(England) Finley Potter	(England) Sheffield United	Undisclosed	

† Signed for the Development squad

=== Out ===
Date	Pos	Player	Transferred to	Fee	Ref
17 June 2023	CM	(Northern Ireland) Chris Conn-Clarke	(England) Altrincham	Undisclosed	
26 June 2023	LB	(England) Danny Andrew	(England) Cambridge United	Undisclosed	
30 June 2023	CM	(England) Daniel Batty	(England) York City	Released	
30 June 2023	RB	(England) Sam Bird	(England) Stockport County	Released	
30 June 2023	DM	(Northern Ireland) Dylan Boyle	(Northern Ireland) Ballymena United	Released	
30 June 2023	GK	(England) Alex Cairns	(England) Salford City	Released	
30 June 2023	CM	(England) Danny Edwards	Free agent	Released	
30 June 2023	CB	(England) Ryan Hand	(England) Boston United	Released	
30 June 2023	CB	(England) Darnell Johnson	(England) Forest Green Rovers	Released	
30 June 2023	MF	(England) Josh Kearns	Free agent	Released	
30 June 2023	RB	(England) Roman Khela	Free agent	Released	
30 June 2023	MF	(England) Kyle King	Free agent	Released	
30 June 2023	LB	(England) Oliver Leggett	Free agent	Released	
30 June 2023	MF	(England) Zane Marsh	Free agent	Released	
30 June 2023	CF	(England) Max McMillan	(England) Wigan Athletic	Released	
30 June 2023	CM	(Australia) Akiel Raffie	(England) Nantwich Town	Released	
30 June 2023	GK	(Wales) Luc Rees	(Wales) Barry Town United	Released	
30 June 2023	DF	(Italy) Chiekh Thiam	(England) Warrington Rylands	Released	
30 June 2023	CM	(England) Ben Thompson	Free agent	Released	
30 June 2023	RB	(Northern Ireland) Jake Wallace	(Northern Ireland) Coleraine	Released	
30 November 2023	CB	(Democratic Republic of the Congo) Aristote Nsiala	Free agent	Mutual Consent	
1 January 2024	CM	(Scotland) Scott Robertson	(England) Notts County	Free Transfer	
4 January 2024	CB	(England) Drew Baker	(England) Macclesfield	Free Transfer	
18 January 2024	CF	(Wales) Will Russ	(England) Southport	Undisclosed	
25 January 2024	CM	(England) Josh Vela	(England) Carlisle United	Free Transfer	
1 February 2024	LB	(England) Josh Earl	(England) Barnsley	Undisclosed	
1 February 2024	CF	(England) Jack Marriott	(Wales) Wrexham	Undisclosed	

=== Loaned in ===
Date	Pos	Player	Loaned from	Date until	Ref
3 July 2023	LB	(Scotland) Adam Montgomery	(Scotland) Celtic	12 January 2024 (Note: On 12 January, Montgomery was recalled back early to Celtic from his season-long loan.)	
17 August 2023	CB	(Republic of Ireland) Bosun Lawal	(Scotland) Celtic	End of Season	
1 September 2023	DM	(England) Xavier Simons	(England) Hull City	End of Season	
1 September 2023	CF	(England) Kabongo Tshimanga	(England) Peterborough United	1 February 2024 (Note: On 1 February, Tshimanga was recalled back early to Peterborough from his season-long loan.)	
12 January 2024	LB	(England) Harry Boyes	(England) Sheffield United	End of Season	
1 February 2024	DF	(England) Elijah Campbell	(England) Everton	End of Season	
1 February 2024	CM	(Republic of Ireland) Gavin Kilkenny	(England) Bournemouth	End of Season	
1 February 2024	LB	(England) Imari Samuels	(England) Brighton & Hove Albion	End of Season	

=== Loaned out ===
Date	Pos	Player	Loaned to	Date until	Ref
4 July 2023	CB	(England) Drew Baker	(Republic of Ireland) Waterford	20 October 2023	
20 July 2023	GK	(England) Patrick Boyes	(England) FC United of Manchester	End of Season	
21 July 2023	CF	(Wales) Will Russ	(England) Marine	7 November 2023	
5 October 2023	RW	(Republic of Ireland) Cian Hayes	(England) Rochdale	28 November 2023 (Note: On 8 November, Hayes' loan at Rochdale was extended by a further month.) (Note: On 28 November, Hayes returned a week early from his loan at Rochdale.)	
12 October 2023	CB	(England) Tom Hoyle	(England) Witton Albion	1 January 2024	
13 October 2023	CM	(Scotland) George Morrison	(England) King's Lynn Town	1 February 2024 (Note: On 17 November, Morrison's loan at King's Lynn Town was extended until February.)	
20 October 2023	RB	(England) Billy Jones	(England) King's Lynn Town	18 November 2023	
27 October 2023	AM	(England) Callum Dolan	(England) Torquay United	1 December 2023 (Note: On 1 December, Dolan was recalled back from his loan at Torquay.)	
31 October 2023	RM	(England) Theo Williams	(England) Torquay United	28 November 2023	
23 December 2023	LB	(England) Finlay Armstrong	(England) Rochdale	End of Season (Note: On 22 January, Armstrong's loan at Rochdale was extended by a further month.) (Note: On 26 February, Armstrong's loan at Rochdale was extended by a further week.) (Note: On 5 March, Armstrong's Rochdale loan was extended until the end of season.)	
5 January 2024	CM	(England) Bosembo Namputu	(England) Bradford (Park Avenue)	3 February 2024	
8 January 2024	RM	(England) Owen Devonport	(England) King's Lynn Town	End of Season	
18 January 2024	CM	(Northern Ireland) Barry Baggley	(Republic of Ireland) Waterford	End of Season	
1 February 2024	RW	(Republic of Ireland) Cian Hayes	(England) Rochdale	End of Season	
1 February 2024	CB	(England) Connor Teale	(Scotland) Arbroath	End of Season	
9 February 2024	RW	(England) Maleace Asamoah	(Republic of Ireland) Waterford	End of Season	
22 February 2024	CM	(England) Harvey Macadam	(Republic of Ireland) Waterford	End of Season	
28 March 2024	CF	(England) Sam Fishburn	(England) York City	End of Season	
28 March 2024	CB	(England) Kayden Hughes	(England) Macclesfield	End of Season	

== Pre-season and friendlies ==
Win Draw Loss Fixtures

On 14 April, the Cod Army announced they would hold a training camp in Waterford, Ireland between 2 and 8 July. During that tour they confirmed a pre-season friendly against sister club Waterford, who are also owned by Fleetwood owner Andrew Pilley. At the end of May, Fleetwood confirmed they would also host Preston North End and Grimsby Town. A fourth friendly was also confirmed in early-June, against Blackburn Rovers. On 8 June a behind-closed-doors friendly with Tranmere Rovers was confirmed. Six days later, a sixth friendly was announced, against Dundee.

1 July 2023 Friendly	Burnley	3–2	Fleetwood Town	Padiham
12:00 BST		Report	Trialist; Patterson	Stadium: Barnfield Training Centre; Attendance: 0 (behind-closed-doors)

4 July 2023 Friendly	Waterford	1–5	Fleetwood Town	Waterford, Ireland
19:00 BST	O'Sullivan 84'	Report	Asamoah 11'; Stockley 28'; Broom 35'; White 67'; Omochere 80'	Stadium: Waterford Regional Sports Centre

8 July 2023 Friendly	Fleetwood Town	1–2	Dundee	Waterford, Ireland
12:30 BST	Marriott 37'	Report	Robinson 26'; McCowan 83'	Stadium: Waterford Regional Sports Centre

12 July 2023 Friendly	Fleetwood Town	0–2	Heart of Midlothian	Thornton-Cleveleys
13:00 BST		Report	Grant (x2)	Stadium: Poolfoot Farm; Attendance: 0 (behind-closed-doors)

15 July 2023 Friendly	Tranmere Rovers	4–1	Fleetwood Town	Birkenhead
13:00 BST	Hawkes (x2); Davies (o.g.)	Report	Hayes	Stadium: The Campus; Attendance: 0 (behind-closed-doors)

21 July 2023 Friendly	Fleetwood Town	0–0	Blackburn Rovers	Fleetwood
19:00 BST		Report		Stadium: Highbury Stadium

25 July 2023 Friendly	Fleetwood Town	0–0	Preston North End	Fleetwood
19:00 BST		Report		Stadium: Highbury Stadium

29 July 2023 Friendly	Fleetwood Town	1–0	Grimsby Town	Fleetwood
15:00 BST	Omochere 13'	Report		Stadium: Highbury Stadium

== Competitions ==
=== Overall record ===
Competition	Starting round	Final position	Record							
Competition	Starting round	Final position	Pld	W	D	L	GF	GA	GD	Win %
League One	Matchday 1		41	7	13	21	42	67	−25	17.07
FA Cup	First round	Second round	2	1	0	1	2	5	−3	50.00
EFL Cup	First round	First round	1	0	0	1	2	3	−1	0.00
EFL Trophy	Group stage	Second round	4	2	1	1	9	6	+3	50.00
Total			48	10	14	24	55	81	−26	20.83

Last updated: 1 April 2024
Source: Soccerway

=== League One ===
==== League table ====
Pos	Team	Pld	W	D	L	GF	GA	GD	Pts	Promotion, qualification or relegation
19	Shrewsbury Town	46	13	9	24	35	67	−32	48	
20	Burton Albion	46	12	10	24	39	67	−28	46	
21	Cheltenham Town (R)	46	12	8	26	41	65	−24	44	Relegation to EFL League Two
22	Fleetwood Town (R)	46	10	13	23	49	72	−23	43	Relegation to EFL League Two
23	Port Vale (R)	46	10	11	25	41	74	−33	41	Relegation to EFL League Two
24	Carlisle United (R)	46	7	9	30	41	81	−40	30	Relegation to EFL League Two

Source: EFL Official Website
Rules for classification: 1) Points; 2) Goal difference; 3) Number of goals scored; 4) Head-to-head results; 5) Wins; 6) Away goals; 7) Penalty points (sec 9.5); 8) 12-point sending off offences
(R) Relegated

==== Results summary ====
Overall								Home						Away					
Pld	W	D	L	GF	GA	GD	Pts	W	D	L	GF	GA	GD	W	D	L	GF	GA	GD
45	9	13	23	46	72	−26	40	5	5	12	23	32	−9	4	8	11	23	40	−17

Last updated: 20 April 2024.
Source: Soccerway

==== Results by round ====
Round	1	2	3	4	5	6	8	9	10	11	12	14	15	16	7^{1}	17	19	20	21	22	23	24	25	26	27	28	29	30	31	18^{3}	32	33	34	35	13^{2}	36	37	38	39	41	42	40^{4}	44	43^{5}	45	46
Ground	A	H	A	A	H	A	H	A	H	A	H	H	A	A	H	H	H	A	A	H	A	H	H	A	H	A	H	A	H	A	A	H	H	A	A	H	A	H	H	H	A	A	H	A	A	H
Result	D	L	L	L	L	L	L	D	W	W	L	L	W	D	D	W	L	L	L	L	D	D	L	L	L	L	L	D	W	W	L	D	L	D	D	W	D	D	D	L	L	L	W	L	W	
Position	12	17	20	21	23	23	24	23	23	21	21	22	22	22	22	21	21	21	21	22	22	23	23	24	24	24	24	24	22	22	23	23	23	23	23	23	22	22	22	23	23	23	23	23	22	

Updated to match(es) played on 20 April 2024. Source: Soccerway
A = Away; H = Home; W = Win; D = Draw; L = Loss; P = Postponed
Notes:
- ^{1} Matchday 7 (vs Blackpool) was postponed due to the international call-ups.
- ^{2} Matchday 13 (vs Port Vale) was postponed due to the international call-ups.
- ^{3} Matchday 18 (vs Bristol Rovers) was postponed due to the international call-ups.
- ^{4} Matchday 40 (vs Blackpool) was postponed due to the international call-ups.
- ^{5} Matchday 43 (vs Peterborough United) was postponed due Peterborough's 2024 EFL Trophy final participation.

==== Matches ====
On 22 June, the EFL League One fixtures were released.

Win Draw Loss Fixtures

5 August 2023 1	Carlisle United	1–1	Fleetwood Town	Carlisle
15:00 BST	Huntington (yellow card) 4'; Moxon 36'; Mellish (yellow card) 42'	Report	Sarpong-Wiredu 45+4'; Nsiala (yellow card) 73'; Earl (yellow card) 85'; Rooney (yellow card) 90+5'	Stadium: Brunton Park; Attendance: 10,279; Referee: Peter Wright

12 August 2023 2	Fleetwood Town	0–2	Cambridge United	Fleetwood
15:00 BST	Robertson (yellow card) 14'; Mayor (yellow card) 26'; Vela (yellow card) 30'	Report	Brophy (yellow card) 28'; Digby (yellow card) 30' (goal) 31'; Ahadme 59'; Lankester (yellow card) 73'	Stadium: Highbury Stadium; Attendance: 3,316; Referee: Seb Stockbridge

15 August 2023 3	Bolton Wanderers	3–1	Fleetwood Town	Horwich
19:45 BST	Adeboyejo 3', 14', 37'; Thomason (yellow card) 28'; Charles (yellow card) 45+1' (yellow-red card) 68'; Ashworth (yellow card) 86'	Report	Johnston (yellow card) 10'; Broom (yellow card) 47'; Omochere (yellow card) 54'; Vela (yellow card) 79'; Earl 90+4'	Stadium: Toughsheet Community Stadium; Attendance: 18,485; Referee: Tom Nield

19 August 2023 4	Derby County	1–0	Fleetwood Town	Derby
15:00 BST	Waghorn 23' (yellow card) 55'; Mendez-Laing (yellow card) 30'; Thompson (yellow card) 40'	Report	Mayor (yellow card) 39'; Johnston (yellow card) 69'; Quitirna (yellow card) 90+2'	Stadium: Pride Park Stadium; Attendance: 24,565; Referee: Lee Swabey

26 August 2023 5	Fleetwood Town	0–1	Shrewsbury Town	Fleetwood
15:00 BST	Lynch (red card) 43'; Vela (yellow card) 75'; Earl (red card) 90+5'	Report	Dunkley (yellow card) 26'; Udoh 41'; Benning (yellow card) 47'; Feeney (yellow card) 71'	Stadium: Highbury Stadium; Attendance: 3,380; Referee: Ben Speedie

2 September 2023 6	Charlton Athletic	2–1	Fleetwood Town	Charlton
15:00 BST	May 43', 73' (pen.) (yellow card) 75'; Blackett-Taylor (yellow card) 78'; Taylor (yellow card) 90+1'; Hector (yellow card) 90+9'	Report	Stockley 16'; Lawal (yellow card) 33'; Vela (yellow card) 77'; Hayes (yellow card) 82'	Stadium: The Valley; Attendance: 11,309; Referee: Carl Brook

16 September 2023 8	Fleetwood Town	0–3	Oxford United	Fleetwood
15:00 BST	Robertson (yellow card) 37'; Vela (yellow card) 65'	Report	Mills 16'; Bodin 27'; Edwards 60'	Stadium: Highbury Stadium; Attendance: 3,744; Referee: Will Finnie

23 September 2023 9	Burton Albion	1–1	Fleetwood Town	Burton upon Trent
15:00 BST	Powell (penalty missed) 17' 17'; Crocombe (yellow card) 42'; Walker (yellow card) 80'	Report	Quitirna 19'	Stadium: Pirelli Stadium; Attendance: 2,750; Referee: Ollie Yates

30 September 2023 10	Fleetwood Town	1–0	Leyton Orient	Fleetwood
15:00 BST	Nsiala (yellow card) 50'; Marriott 56'; Johnston (yellow card) 77' (yellow-red card) 90+9'	Report	Beckles (yellow card) 52'; Sotiriou (yellow card) 89'; Brown (yellow card) 90+4'; Galbraith (yellow card) 90+4' (yellow-red card) 90+9'	Stadium: Highbury Stadium; Attendance: 3,189; Referee: Simon Mather

3 October 2023 11	Cheltenham Town	0–2	Fleetwood Town	Cheltenham
19:45 BST	Street (yellow card) 55'; Freestone (yellow card) 65'; Davies (red card) 70'	Report	Omochere (yellow card) 9'; Quitirna 19'; Lawal (yellow card) 39'; Robertson (yellow card) 59'; Broom (yellow card) 72'; Marriott 80'; Stockley (yellow card) 90+9'	Stadium: The Completely-Suzuki Stadium; Attendance: 3,104; Referee: Sam Purkiss

7 October 2023 12	Fleetwood Town	1–4	Wycombe Wanderers	Fleetwood
15:00 BST	Vela (yellow card) 45+3'; Heneghan (yellow card) 46' (yellow-red card) 63'; Marriott 61'; Rooney (yellow card) 74'	Report	Taylor 20', 41'; Potts 34'; Low (yellow card) 36'; Leahy 64'; Boyes (yellow card) 76'	Stadium: Highbury Stadium; Attendance: 2,904; Referee: Ross Joyce

21 October 2023 14	Fleetwood Town	0–1	Lincoln City	Fleetwood
15:00 BST	Simons (yellow card) 36'; Robertson (yellow card) 89'; Nsiala (red card) 90+6'; Vela (yellow card) 90+11'	Report	Mitchell 8'; Jensen (yellow card) 36'; Hamilton (yellow card) 43'; Sørensen (yellow card) 45'; Adelakun (yellow card) 90+2'	Stadium: Highbury Stadium; Attendance: 3,022; Referee: Tom Reeves

24 October 2023 15	Reading	1–2	Fleetwood Town	Reading
20:00 BST	Ballard 56'; Carson (yellow card) 90+7'	Report	Lawal 2'; Vela (yellow card) 88' (goal) 90+2'; Stockley (yellow card) 90+8'	Stadium: Select Car Leasing Stadium; Attendance: 9,490; Referee: Ben Atkinson

28 October 2023 16	Barnsley	2–2	Fleetwood Town	Barnsley
15:00 GMT	Cole (penalty missed) 7' 7'; Williams (yellow card) 32'; Kane (yellow card) 38'; O'Keeffe 88'	Report	Quitirna 3', 34'; Broom (yellow card) 45'; Marriott (yellow card) 45+4'	Stadium: Oakwell; Attendance: 12,141; Referee: Neil Hair

1 November 2023 7	Fleetwood Town	3–3	Blackpool	Fleetwood
19:45 GMT	Omochere 13'; Marriott 18', 90'; Earl (yellow card) 54'; Vela (yellow card) 71'	Report	Pennington (yellow card) 17'; Carey 48', 51'; Lavery (yellow card) 65' (goal) 66'; Dougall (yellow card) 77'	Stadium: Highbury Stadium; Referee: Darren Drysdale
Note: Fixture was previously postponed due to international call-ups.

11 November 2023 17	Fleetwood Town	3–0	Exeter City	Fleetwood
15:00 GMT	Broom 6' (yellow card) 73'; Sarpong-Wiredu 32'; Patterson 42'; Omochere (yellow card) 66'	Report	Wildschut (yellow card) 65'; Diabate (yellow card) 75'	Stadium: Highbury Stadium; Attendance: 2,688; Referee: Thomas Kirk

15 November 2023 19	Fleetwood Town	0–3	Stevenage	Fleetwood
15:00 GMT		Report	Reid 8'; Thompson 56'; List 90+5'	Stadium: Highbury Stadium; Attendance: 2,771; Referee: Christopher Pollard

28 November 2023 20	Wigan Athletic	3–0	Fleetwood Town	Wigan
19:45 GMT	Jones 4'; Clare 31'; Pearce 61'; Stones (yellow card) 83'	Report	Heneghan (yellow card) 26'; Patterson (yellow card) 29'; Earl (yellow card) 40' (yellow-red card) 45+1'; Sarpong-Wiredu (yellow card) 51'	Stadium: DW Stadium; Attendance: 8,129; Referee: Edward Duckworth

9 December 2023 21	Northampton Town	3–0	Fleetwood Town	Northampton
15:00 GMT	Pinnock 27', 90'; Hoskins 31' (pen.); Bowie (yellow card) 49'	Report	Mayor (yellow card) 22'	Stadium: Sixfields Stadium; Attendance: 5,491; Referee: Marc Edwards

16 December 2023 22	Fleetwood Town	0–1	Peterborough United	Fleetwood
15:00 GMT	Vela (yellow card) 13'; Lawal (yellow card) 55'	Report	Collins 42'	Stadium: Highbury Stadium; Attendance: 2,973; Referee: Will Finnie

23 December 2023 23	Portsmouth	1–1	Fleetwood Town	Portsmouth
15:00 GMT	Bishop 45+3' (pen.); Saydee (yellow card) 69'; Scully (yellow card) 90+2'; Sparkes (yellow card) 90+5'	Report	Earl 63'; Dolan (yellow card) 70'	Stadium: Fratton Park; Attendance: 18,412; Referee: Tom Nield

26 December 2023 24	Fleetwood Town	1–1	Carlisle United	Fleetwood
15:00 GMT	Stockley 35'; Sarpong-Wiredu (yellow card) 65'	Report	Moxon 27'	Stadium: Highbury Stadium; Attendance: 3,862; Referee: Adam Herczeg

29 December 2023 25	Fleetwood Town	0–2	Bolton Wanderers	Fleetwood
19:45 GMT	Sarpong-Wiredu (yellow card) 36'; Asamoah (yellow card) 82'	Report	Thomason (yellow card) 41'; Charles 49'; Adeboyejo 83'	Stadium: Highbury Stadium; Attendance: 3,922; Referee: Ollie Yates

1 January 2024 26	Shrewsbury Town	3–1	Fleetwood Town	Shrewsbury
15:00 GMT	Kenneh 9'; Dunkley 45+3'; Feeney (yellow card) 51'; Shipley 58'; Bennett (yellow card) 65'; Mata (yellow card) 86'; Perry (yellow card) 87'	Report	Rooney (yellow card) 31', (goal) 66'; Dolan (yellow card) 45+4'	Stadium: The Croud Meadow; Attendance: 5,537; Referee: Jacob Miles

6 January 2024 27	Fleetwood Town	1–3	Derby County	Fleetwood
12:30 GMT	Vela (yellow card) 31'; Stockley 76'	Report	Mendez-Laing 27'; Collins 45+1', (yellow card) 73'; Barkhuizen 90'	Stadium: Highbury Stadium; Attendance: 4,045; Referee: Ben Speedie
Note: Fixture was originally scheduled for a 15:00 kick-off, but was brought forward for TV coverage.

13 January 2024 28	Cambridge United	2–1	Fleetwood Town	Cambridge
15:00 GMT	Taylor 71'; Kaikai 90+1'	Report	Dolan (yellow card) 16'; Omochere 77'; Heneghan (yellow card) 83'	Stadium: Cledara Abbey Stadium; Attendance: 6,555; Referee: Scott Tallis

20 January 2024 29	Fleetwood Town	0–1	Portsmouth	Fleetwood
15:00 GMT	Vela (yellow card) 30'; Henegahn (yellow card) 36'; Lawal (yellow card) 45'; Marriott (yellow card) 57'	Report	Kamara 25'; Morrell (yellow card) 42'; Shaughnessy (yellow card) 77'; Pack (yellow card) 90'; Lane (yellow card) 90+1'	Stadium: Highbury Stadium; Referee: Neil Hair

27 January 2024 30	Wycombe Wanderers	2–2	Fleetwood Town	High Wycombe
15:00 GMT	Potts (yellow card) 43'; Leahy (penalty missed) 54'; McCleary 62' (pen.); Kone 83'	Report	Omochere 14' (yellow card) 28' (yellow-red card) 45+4'; Stockley 30' (yellow card) 67'; Heneghan (yellow card) 52'; Lawal (yellow card) 81'	Stadium: Adams Park

3 February 2024 31	Fleetwood Town	3–0	Port Vale	Fleetwood
15:00 GMT	Stockley 8'; Johnston (yellow card) 33'; Mayor (yellow card) 54'; Coughlan 65'; Kilkenny (yellow card) 90'; Broom 90+4'	Report	Lowe (yellow card) 63'	Stadium: Highbury Stadium; Attendance: 3,751; Referee: Peter Wright

6 February 2024 18	Bristol Rovers	0–2	Fleetwood Town	Horfield
19:45 GMT	Baggott (yellow card) 27'; Marquis (yellow card) 57'; Aguilera (yellow card) 67'; Martin (yellow card) 84' (yellow-red card) 90+3'	Report	Coughlan 20'; Stockley 52'; Campbell (yellow card) 57'; Kilkenny (yellow card) 66'; Broom (yellow card) 70'	Stadium: Memorial Stadium; Attendance: 7,385; Referee: Charles Breakspear
Note: Fixture was originally scheduled for 18 November, but was postponed due to international call-ups.

10 February 2024 32	Lincoln City	2–1	Fleetwood Town	Lincoln
15:00 GMT	O'Connor (yellow card) 19'; House (yellow card) 45+2' (goal) 53'; Erhahon (yellow card) 45+3'; Sørensen 57'	Report	Omochere 34'; Lawal (yellow card) 41' (yellow-red card) 45+3'; Stockley (yellow card) 45+2'	Stadium: LNER Stadium; Attendance: 8,282; Referee: Daniel Middleton

13 February 2024 33	Fleetwood Town	1–1	Reading	Fleetwood
19:45 GMT	Sarpong-Wiredu 90+5'	Report	Bindon (yellow card) 21'; Wing 74'; Mola (yellow card) 80'; Button (yellow card) 88'	Stadium: Highbury Stadium; Attendance: 3,082; Referee: Simon Mather

17 February 2024 34	Fleetwood Town	1–2	Barnsley	Fleetwood
15:00 GMT	Lawal 32'	Report	Cosgrove 23'; de Gevigney (yellow card) 49'; McCart (yellow card) 55'; Kane 59'; Earl (yellow card) 63'; Cadden (yellow card) 77'	Stadium: Highbury Stadium; Attendance: 3,850; Referee: Declan Bourne

24 February 2024 35	Exeter City	1–1	Fleetwood Town	Exeter
15:00 GMT	Harper 24'; Cole (yellow card) 50'; Sweeney (yellow card) 61'; Sinisalo (yellow card) 74'; Wildschut (yellow card) 78'	Report	Omochere 74'; Broom (yellow card) 84'	Stadium: St James Park; Attendance: 6,547; Referee: Sam Purkiss

27 February 2024 13	Port Vale	2–2	Fleetwood Town	Burslem
19:45 GMT	Weir 18'; Chislett 43' (pen.)	Report	Lynch (yellow card) 43'; Johnston (yellow card) 50'; Stockley 88', 90+3'	Stadium: Vale Park; Attendance: 4,358; Referee: Darren Drysdale
Note: Fixture was originally scheduled for 14 October, but was postponed due to international call-ups.

2 March 2024 36	Fleetwood Town	4–2	Wigan Athletic	Fleetwood
15:00 GMT	Lawal 15', 36'; Kilkenny 54'; Stockley 61'	Report	Humphrys 17'; Aasgaard 26'; Hughes (yellow card) 90+3'	Stadium: Highbury Stadium; Attendance: 3,827; Referee: Anthony Backhouse

9 March 2024 37	Stevenage	0–0	Fleetwood Town	Stevenage
15:00 GMT	Thompson (yellow card) 28'	Report	Holgate (yellow card) 21' (yellow-red card) 68'; Rooney (yellow card) 75'; Stockley (yellow card) 85'	Stadium: Lamex Stadium; Attendance: 3,911; Referee: Adam Herczeg

12 March 2024 38	Fleetwood Town	0–0	Bristol Rovers	Fleetwood
19:45 GMT	Rooney (yellow card) 84'; Broom (yellow card) 88'	Report	Hoole (yellow card) 79'; Finley (yellow card) 87'	Stadium: Highbury Stadium; Attendance: 2,456; Referee: Ross Joyce

16 March 2024 39	Fleetwood Town	1–1	Charlton Athletic	Fleetwood
15:00 GMT	Stockley (yellow card) 34'; Graydon 84'; Broom (yellow card) 88'; Sarpong-Wiredu (yellow card) 90+9'	Report	May 45+1' (pen.); Ladapo (yellow card) 90+9'	Stadium: Highbury Stadium; Attendance: 3,401; Referee: Tom Reeves

29 March 2024 41	Fleetwood Town	1–2	Cheltenham Town	Fleetwood
15:00 GMT	Sarpong-Wiredu (yellow card) 65'; Graydon 79'	Report	Sercombe 30'; Ferry (yellow card) 42'; Pett (yellow card) 56'; Keena 82'	Stadium: Highbury Stadium; Attendance: 3,642; Referee: Ollie Yates

1 April 2024 42	Oxford United	4–0	Fleetwood Town	Oxford
15:00 BST	Brannagan 14'; Harris 30', 83'; Dale 43'	Report	Sarpong-Wiredu (yellow card) 35'; Lawal (yellow card) 48'	Stadium: The Kassam Stadium; Attendance: 8,631; Referee: Scott Jackson

9 April 2024 40	Blackpool	1–0	Fleetwood Town	Blackpool
19:45 BST	Beesley 22'; Lavery (penalty missed) 77', (yellow card) 82'; Coulson (yellow card) 77'	Report	Sarpong-Wiredu (yellow card) 68'; Lawal (yellow card) 82'; Lynch (yellow card) 86'	Stadium: Bloomfield Road; Attendance: 10,845; Referee: Marc Edwards
Note: Fixture was originally scheduled for 23 March, but was postponed due to international call-ups.

13 April 2024 44	Fleetwood Town	2–0	Northampton Town	Fleetwood
15:00 BST	Omochere 5'; Lawal 30', (yellow card) 84'; Mayor (yellow card) 65'; Broom (yellow card) 71'	Report	McGowan (yellow card) 17'; Bowie (yellow card) 80'	Stadium: Highbury Stadium; Referee: Thomas Kirk

16 April 2024 43	Peterborough United	4–1	Fleetwood Town	Peterborough
19:45 BST	Mothersille 17'; Collins 81'; Clarke-Harris 90+5', 90+6'	Report	Lawal 1', (penalty missed) 76'; Omochere (penalty missed) 10'	Stadium: Weston Homes Stadium; Attendance: 6,358; Referee: Seb Stockbridge
Note: Fixture was initially scheduled for 6 April, but was postponed due to Peterborough's 2024 EFL Trophy final on the 7 April.

20 April 2024 45	Leyton Orient	0–1	Fleetwood Town	Leyton
15:00 BST		Report	Rooney (yellow card) 89'; Simons 90+3'	Stadium: Gaughan Group Stadium; Attendance: 8,249; Referee: Alex Chilowicz

27 April 2024 46	Fleetwood Town	3–0	Burton Albion	Fleetwood
15:00 BST	Johnston 17'; Patterson 31'; Lonergan 76'	Report		Stadium: Highbury Stadium; Attendance: 3,397; Referee: Simon Mather

=== FA Cup ===
Fleetwood were drawn away to Kidderminster Harriers in the first round and to Cambridge United in the second round.

Win Draw Loss Fixtures

5 November 2023 First round	Kidderminster Harriers	1–2	Fleetwood Town	Kidderminster
14:00 GMT	Hobson 44'; Penny (yellow card) 78'	Report	Earl 45+1'; Rooney 46'; Sarpong-Wiredu (yellow card) 75'	Stadium: Aggborough Stadium; Attendance: 2,496; Referee: Matthew Corlett

2 December 2023 Second round	Cambridge United	4–0	Fleetwood Town	Cambridge
15:00 GMT	Andrew 7'; Kachunga 11'; Okenabirhie 13'; Ahadme (penalty missed) 29' 83'; Okedina (yellow card) 38'	Report	Stockley (yellow card) 65'	Stadium: Abbey Stadium; Attendance: 3,387; Referee: Seb Stockbridge

=== EFL Cup ===
Town were drawn away to Port Vale in the first round.

Win Draw Loss Fixtures

8 August 2023 First round	Port Vale	3–2	Fleetwood Town	Burslem
19:45 BST	Chislett 18', 72' (yellow card) 41'; Arblaster (yellow card) 20'; Thomas 58'; Grant (yellow card) 68'; Iacovitti (yellow card) 90+6'	Report	Hayes 5'; Rooney (yellow card) 41'; Graydon 47'; Broom (yellow card) 66'	Stadium: Vale Park; Attendance: 2,743; Referee: Edward Duckworth

=== EFL Trophy ===
In the group stage, Fleetwood Town were drawn into Northern Group D alongside Wigan Athletic and Tranmere Rovers. A day later, Leicester City U21 joined the group. After finishing second in the group, they were drawn away to Derby County in the second round.

Pos	Div	Team	Pld	W	PW	PL	L	GF	GA	GD	Pts	Qualification
1	L1	Wigan Athletic	3	1	2	0	0	10	4	+6	7	Advance to Round 2
2	L1	Fleetwood Town	3	2	0	1	0	9	3	+6	7	Advance to Round 2
3	ACA	Leicester City U21	3	1	0	0	2	2	11	−9	3	
4	L2	Tranmere Rovers	3	0	0	1	2	0	3	−3	1	

Updated to match(es) played on 14 November 2023. Source: EFL.com

Win Draw Loss Fixtures

5 September 2023 Group stage	Fleetwood Town	2–0	Tranmere Rovers	Fleetwood
19:00 BST	Graydon (yellow card) 31'; Mayor (yellow card) 44'; Vela (yellow card) 58'; Stockley 73' (pen.); Patterson 82'; Rooney (yellow card) 83'; Teale (yellow card) 90+5'	Report	Pike (yellow card) 23' (yellow-red card) 72'; Jolley (yellow card) 83'; Turnbull (yellow card) 84'	Stadium: Highbury Stadium; Referee: Scott Simpson

10 October 2023 Group stage	Wigan Athletic	3–3	Fleetwood Town	Wigan
19:00 BST	Clare (yellow card) 8'; Watts (yellow card) 31'; Humphrys 55' (yellow card) 64'; Stones 65'; Pearce 87'	Report	Rooney (yellow card) 25'; Tshimanga 43', 45+3'; Robertson (yellow card) 67'; Earl 90+3'; Marriott (yellow card) 90+5'	Stadium: DW Stadium; Attendance: 1,600; Referee: Scott Tallis
	Penalties
	Lang (penalty missed); Sze (penalty scored); Pearce (penalty missed); Clare (penalty scored); Stones (penalty scored); Hughes (penalty scored)		Marriott (penalty scored); Mayor (penalty missed); Robertson (penalty scored); Simons (penalty missed); Earl (penalty scored); Broom (penalty missed)

7 November 2023 Group stage	Fleetwood Town	4–0	Leicester City U21	Fleetwood
19:00 GMT	Broom 29', 40'; Johnson 49'; Simons (yellow card) 63'; Glenfield (yellow card) 82'; Graydon 86'	Report		Stadium: Highbury Stadium; Referee: Michael Barlow

5 December 2023 Second round	Derby County	3–0	Fleetwood Town	Derby
19:00 GMT	Collins 25', 77'; Waghorn (yellow card) 43'; Hourihane (yellow card) 79'; John-Jules 88'	Report	Heneghan (yellow card) 18'; Earl (yellow card) 26'; Sarpong-Wiredu (yellow card) 35'	Stadium: Pride Park Stadium; Attendance: 1,981; Referee: Scott Jackson
