= Callum Dolan =

English footballer

Personal information
- Full name: Callum Phillipe Dolan
- Date of birth: 29 September 2000 (age 26)
- Place of birth: Manchester, England
- Height: 1.79 m (5 ft 10 in)
- Position: Midfielder

Team information
- Current team: Kidderminster Harriers

Youth career
- 2010–2017: Manchester United
- 2017–2018: Blackburn Rovers
- 2018: Bury

Senior career*
Years	Team	Apps	(Gls)
2018–2019	Stockport Town		
2019	Altrincham	4	(0)
2019	Oldham Athletic	0	(0)
2019	→ Ashton United (loan)	2	(0)
2019–2020	Radcliffe	8	(0)
2020–2021	Matlock Town	5	(0)
2021–2023	Warrington Rylands	50	(21)
2023–2025	Fleetwood Town	15	(0)
2023	→ Torquay United (loan)	5	(1)
2024	→ Oldham Athletic (loan)	6	(0)
2025	→ Altrincham (loan)	6	(0)
2025–2026	Torquay United	20	(5)
2026–	Kidderminster Harriers	0	(0)
- * Club domestic league appearances and goals as of 21:29, 2 June 2026 (UTC)

Callum Phillipe Dolan (born 29 September 2000) is an English professional footballer who plays as a midfielder for National League club Kidderminster Harriers.

== Career ==
=== Early career ===
Dolan started his youth career at Manchester United, where he spent seven years in the Academy Programme as a schoolboy. He was released by Manchester United towards the end of the 2016–17 season and subsequently signed for Blackburn Rovers, playing two games in the U18 Premier League. He signed a scholarship on the YTS programme for the 2017–18 season but left by mutual agreement in 2018. He then later played for Bury in the Alliance U18 League and also trained with the first team. Dolan dropped into Non-League and men's football when he signed for North West Counties Football League Division One South side Stockport Town in November 2018. He was rewarded with the Player of the Month award in December 2018, having numerous goals and Man of the Match awards. He transferred to National League North Altrincham in February 2019 and made his debut as a substitute against Curzon Ashton. He only played four times for the club as they finished in 5th position and qualified to the play-offs, but were defeated by Chorley in the semi-final. In July 2019, he featured in a pre-season friendly for EFL League One side Burton Albion against Matlock Town whilst on trial.

=== Oldham Athletic ===
He turned professional with Oldham Athletic in August 2019, signing a one-year deal, with the option of a further year. He had scored against the Latics in a pre-season friendly for Ashton United and had also featured against them for Stockport County. He made his professional debut a week later in the 3–2 EFL Trophy Group Stage win over Liverpool U21 at Boundary Park, replacing Urko Vera as a second-half substitute. On 30 August 2019, he was sent out on a one-month rolling loan to Northern Premier League Premier Division side Ashton United, where he went on to make two appearances. On 27 September 2019, his contract at Oldham was terminated following his young offender institution sentencing. The club commented, "Following the police investigation and sentencing the club were left with no other alternative than to terminate his contract due to the seriousness of the offences".

=== Return to Non-League ===
Following from his release from young offenders, he signed for Northern Premier League Premier Division side Radcliffe in December 2019 and made his first appearance for them in the Boxing Day clash with Atherton Collieries. However, he only went on to make eight appearances before the season was curtailed and eventually expunged following the COVID-19 outbreak in March 2020. When football restarted again for the 2020-21 season, Dolan transferred to fellow Northern Premier League Premier Division side Matlock Town in June 2020. In March 2021, it was announced that Dolan had been released by the club by the manager, Paul Phillips, but the chairman later confirmed that he had not been released as the club regained his registration until the end of the season, however, he was allowed to trial with National League side Stockport County.

=== Warrington Rylands ===
In June 2021, he became the first signing of the 2021–22 season for Dave McNabb at newly-promoted Northern Premier League Division One West side Warrington Rylands. McNabb confirmed that he had watched Dolan for a while after he had impressed against his side whilst playing for Stockport Town and made an approach to Matlock as soon as he realised that he wouldn't be staying. In his first season for the club he scored seven goals as Rylands were promoted as Champions to the NPL Premier Division in their maiden season in the Northern Premier League. Rylands adapted to life well in the Premier Division and Dolan was the League's top goalscorer in October 2022 with 12 goals. The club had been forced to ship out a number of their first team squad due to financial issues, but Dolan's goals had kept them away from the relegation zone and he was linked with moves higher up the pyramid. He was an ever-present during the 2022–23 season up until January with 15 goals in 26 appearances in all competitions.

=== Fleetwood Town ===
On 6 January 2023, he signed for EFL League One side Fleetwood Town on a two-and-a-half-year contract for an undisclosed fee. It was reported to be a record sale fee for Rylands and he was the second player to move up to the English Football League following Elliott Nevitt to Tranmere Rovers in 2021. He made his EFL debut on 4 February 2023, in a 3–2 defeat to Burton Albion at Highbury Stadium, replacing Jack Marriott as a substitute and went on to assist Promise Omochere for a goal. He made four appearances in total in the 2022–23 season.

He started the 2023–24 season with an injury and failed to feature for the first team in the first few months of the campaign but made his comeback for the under-21's in October for a Professional Development League match against Birmingham City on 16 October. On 27 October, he moved on loan to National League South side Torquay United until 30 December, who were managed by Gary Johnson, father of Fleetwood manager, Lee Johnson. He enjoyed a valuable spell on loan at the Gulls making six appearances and scoring twice in all competitions, with goals against Yeovil Town and Eastbourne Borough in the FA Trophy and League respectively. On 1 December, he was recalled early from his loan in order for him to play in Fleetwood's FA Cup second-round tie away at Cambridge United.

In August 2024, Dolan returned to Oldham Athletic on loan until 2 January 2025. In March 2025 he moved on loan to Altrincham.

=== Torquay United ===
In June 2025, Dolan returned to National League South side Torquay United on a one-year deal after leaving Fleetwood Town.

=== Kidderminster Harriers ===
On 2 June 2026, Dolan joined newly promoted National League club Kidderminster Harriers, reuniting with his former Torquay United manager Paul Wotton.

== Personal life ==
In September 2019, Dolan was sentenced to eight months in a young offender institution following a 98 mph police chase on the M60 motorway near Ashton-under-Lyne for dangerous driving and driving whilst disqualified. He had previously been banned from driving following another police chase where he was intoxicated at the wheel.

== Career statistics ==
As of end of 2025–26 season

Appearances and goals by club, season and competition
Club	Season	League			FA Cup		EFL Cup		Other		Total	
Club	Season	Division	Apps	Goals	Apps	Goals	Apps	Goals	Apps	Goals	Apps	Goals
Altrincham	2018–19	National League North	4	0	—		—		0	0	4	0
Oldham Athletic	2019–20	League Two	0	0	—		0	0	1 (Note: Appearance in the EFL Trophy)	0	1	0
Ashton United (loan)	2019–20	NPL Premier Division	2	0	—		—		—		2	0
Radcliffe	2019–20	NPL Premier Division	8	0	—		—		—		8	0
Matlock Town	2020–21	NPL Premier Division	5	0	2	1	—		2 (Note: Appearance in the FA Trophy)	0	9	1
Warrington Rylands	2021–22	NPL Division One West	27	7	2	0	—		2 (Note: One appearance in FA Trophy and one appearance in Pitching In Super Cup)	0	31	7
Warrington Rylands	2022–23	NPL Premier Division	23	14	1	0	—		2	1	26	15
Warrington Rylands	Total		50	21	3	0	0	0	4	1	57	22
Fleetwood Town	2022–23	League One	4	0	—		—		—		4	0
Fleetwood Town	2023–24	League One	11	0	1	0	0	0	1	0	13	0
Fleetwood Town	2024–25	League Two	0	0	0	0	0	0	0	0	0	0
Fleetwood Town	Total		15	0	1	0	0	0	1	0	17	0
Torquay United (loan)	2023–24	National League South	5	1	—		—		1	1	6	2
Oldham Athletic (loan)	2024–25	National League	6	0	0	0	—		0	0	6	0
Altrincham (loan)	2024–25	National League	6	0	0	0	—		0	0	6	0
Torquay United	2025–26	National League South	20	5	0	0	—		2 (Note: Appearance(s) in National League South play-offs)	0	22	5
Career total			121	27	6	1	0	0	11	2	138	30

== Honours ==
Warrington Rylands

- Northern Premier League Division One West: 2021–22

Individual

- North West Counties Football League Division One South, Player of the Month: December 2018
