= Kyle White =

Kyle White may refer to:

- Kyle White (rugby league) (born 1970), Australian rugby league player
- Kyle White (US soldier) (born 1987), US Medal of Honor recipient
- Kyle White (footballer) (born 2004), English footballer

== See also ==
- Kyle Powys Whyte, American indigenous philosopher and scholar
