= Connor Teale =

English footballer (born 2002)

Personal information
- Full name: Connor Derek Teale
- Date of birth: 8 October 2002 (age 24)
- Place of birth: Akrotiri, Cyprus
- Position: Defender

Team information
- Current team: Boston United
- Number: 14

Youth career
- –2021: Leeds United

Senior career*
Years	Team	Apps	(Gls)
2021–2024	Fleetwood Town	5	(0)
2021–2022	→ Marine (loan)	5	(0)
2022	→ Curzon Ashton (loan)	12	(0)
2022–2023	→ Farsley Celtic (loan)	6	(0)
2023	→ Alfreton Town (loan)	18	(0)
2024	→ Arbroath (loan)	11	(0)
2024	Altrincham	1	(0)
2024–	Boston United	12	(2)
- * Club domestic league appearances and goals as of 18:52, 3 December 2024 (UTC)

Connor Derek Teale (born 8 October 2002) is an English professional footballer who plays as a defender for National League club Boston United.

== Career ==
Teale started his career in the academy of Leeds United and progressed to be a member of the under-18 squad, featuring in the under-18 Premier League and the FA Youth Cup. He was expected to progress onto the under-23 squad having already been named as an unused sub for the EFL Trophy against Accrington Stanley in September 2020, which Leeds infamously lost 7–0.

On 19 April 2021, with his contract expiring, he decided to leave Leeds and joined EFL League One side Fleetwood Town, signing his first professional contract until the end of the 2022–23 season with the club holding an option for a further year. He went straight into the Development Squad which was managed by Stephen Crainey. He made two first team appearances in the EFL Trophy matches against Barrow and Bolton Wanderers in October and November 2021.

On 24 December 2021, he was sent out on loan to Northern Premier League Division One West side Marine for an initial month, as the club were missing three out of four centre backs. On 28 January 2022, he was recalled from his loan spell by Fleetwood, having made four starts and one sub appearance for the Mariners.

On the same day it was announced that he had instead been sent out on loan to National League North side Curzon Ashton on an initial one-month deal. On 28 February 2022, he extended his stay at Curzon Ashton for a further month after he had been an ever-present figure in the side's backline and was instrumental in the team keeping a number of clean sheets in the previous month.

On 3 December 2022, Teale joined National League North side Farsley Celtic on a one-month loan deal.

On 1 February 2024, Teale joined Scottish Championship club Arbroath on loan until the end of the season. Following the conclusion of the 2023–24 season, he was released by Fleetwood Town upon the expiration of his contract.

On 4 October 2024, Teale joined National League club Altrincham. In December 2024, he joined fellow National League side Boston United on a permanent transfer., and after securing safety, on 31 May 2025, he signed a 2-year deal.

== Career statistics ==
As of match played 30 November 2024

Appearances and goals by club, season and competition
Club	Season	League			FA Cup		League Cup		Other		Total	
Club	Season	Division	Apps	Goals	Apps	Goals	Apps	Goals	Apps	Goals	Apps	Goals
Fleetwood Town	2021–22	League One	0	0	0	0	0	0	2 (Note: Appearance in EFL Trophy)	0	2	0
Fleetwood Town	2022–23	League One	1	0	0	0	0	0	1	0	2	0
Fleetwood Town	2023–24	League One	4	0	0	0	1	0	3	0	8	0
Fleetwood Town	Total		5	0	0	0	1	0	6	0	12	0
Marine (loan)	2021–22	NPL Division One West	5	0	—		—		—		5	0
Curzon Ashton (loan)	2021–22	National League North	12	0	—		—		—		12	0
Farsley Celtic (loan)	2022–23	National League North	6	0	—		—		1 (Note: Appearance in FA Trophy)	0	7	0
Alfreton Town (loan)	2022–23	National League North	17	0	—		—		1 (Note: Appearance in National League North play-offs)	0	18	0
Arbroath (loan)	2023–24	Scottish Championship	11	0	0	0	0	0	0	0	11	0
Altrincham	2024–25	National League	1	0	0	0	—		1 (Note: Appearance(s) in National League Cup)	0	2	0
Boston United	2024–25	National League	1	0	0	0	—		0	0	1	0
Career total			58	0	0	0	1	0	9	0	68	0
