= Kyle White (footballer) =

English footballer (born 2004)

Personal information
- Full name: Kyle Richard White
- Date of birth: 25 March 2004 (age 22)
- Place of birth: Burnley, England
- Position: Midfielder

Team information
- Current team: Guiseley

Youth career
- –2021: AFC Darwen

Senior career*
Years	Team	Apps	(Gls)
2021–2022	AFC Blackpool		
2022–2024	Fleetwood Town	3	(0)
2024–2025	Waterford	28	(2)
2026–	Guiseley	0	(0)
- * Club domestic league appearances and goals as of 19:10, 4 February 2026 (UTC)

Kyle Richard White (born 25 March 2004) is an English professional footballer who plays as a midfielder for Northern Premier League Premier Division club Guiseley.

== Career ==
White was born in Burnley, Lancashire but was raised in Haslingden, Lancashire and attended Haslingden High School in the town. He started playing football for his local side Junior Hoops from the age of five and stayed with the club till the age of fifteen, turning down trials with professional clubs. He subsequently signed for the youth team at AFC Darwen where he won the Lancashire County Cup. It was at Darwen that he was spotted by a scout at Blackpool and he was invited on a six-week trial, however, this proved to be unsuccessful. He subsequently returned to playing youth team football for Darwen and also played men's football for Haslingden St Marys, but the Darwen youth team disbanded in the summer of 2021.

Following his release he signed for North West Counties Football League Division One North side A.F.C. Blackpool for the 2021–22 season, playing for both the under-18 side and first team. He played a part in the FA Youth Cup run playing against West Didsbury & Chorlton and Wrexham and also scored one goal in fourteen appearances for the first team.

On 3 January 2022, he signed for EFL League One side Fleetwood Town on a short-term deal until the end of the 2021–22 season following a successful trial in December, with the club holding the option of a further year. He went straight into the under-18 side managed by Simon Wiles. White made his professional debut for Fleetwood on 6 August 2022, when he came on as a second-half substitute for Brendan Sarpong-Wiredu in the 2–1 win over Plymouth Argyle in EFL League One at the Highbury Stadium.

On 3 July 2024, White signed for League of Ireland Premier Division club Waterford on an 18 month contract.

On 30 January 2026, he signed for Northern Premier League Premier Division club Guiseley.

== Career statistics ==
As of match played 7 November 2025

Appearances and goals by club, season and competition
Club	Season	League			National Cup		League Cup		Other		Total	
Club	Season	Division	Apps	Goals	Apps	Goals	Apps	Goals	Apps	Goals	Apps	Goals
Fleetwood Town	2022–23	League One	3	0	0	0	2	0	1 (Note: Appearance(s) in the EFL Trophy)	0	6	0
Fleetwood Town	2023–24	League One	0	0	0	0	0	0	0	0	0	0
Fleetwood Town	Total		3	0	0	0	2	0	1	0	6	0
Waterford	2024	LOI Premier Division	0	0	0	0	–		–		0	0
Waterford	2025	LOI Premier Division	28	2	1	0	–		3 (Note: 2 appearances in the Munster Senior Cup; 1 appearance in the 2025 League of Ireland Premier Division Promotion/Relegation play-off)	0	32	2
Waterford	Total		28	2	1	0	–		3	0	32	2
Guiseley	2025–26	NPL Premier Division	0	0	–		–		–		0	0
Career total			31	2	1	0	2	0	4	0	38	2
