= Bosun Lawal =

Irish footballer (born 2003)

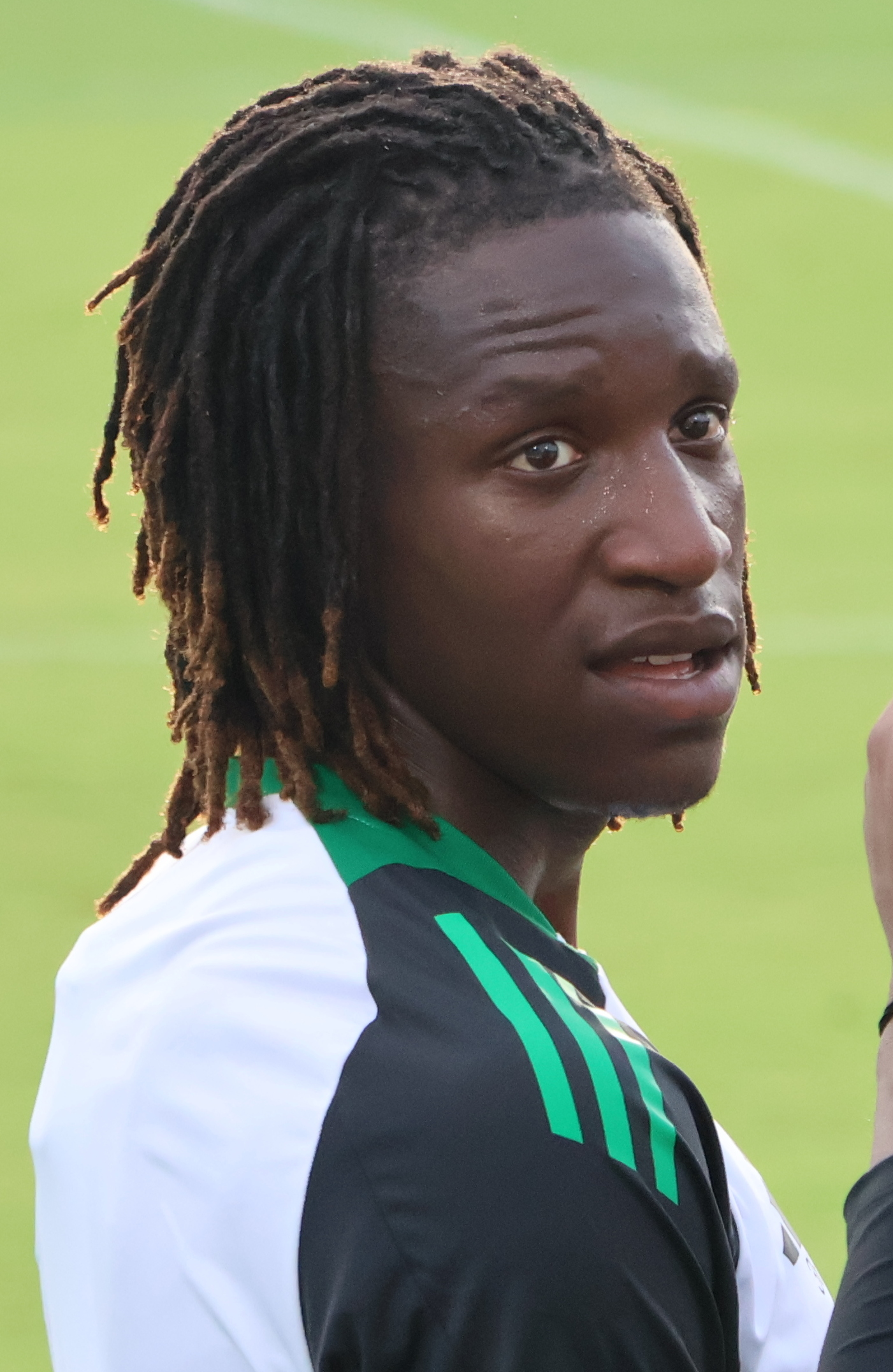
- Lawal training with Celtic in 2024

Personal information
- Full name: Mohammed Bosun Lawal
- Date of birth: 30 May 2003 (age 23)
- Place of birth: Dublin, Ireland
- Height: 6 ft 2 in (1.88 m)
- Positions: Defender; midfielder

Team information
- Current team: Stoke City
- Number: 18

Youth career
- Corduff
- St. Kevin's Boys
- Bohemians
- 2019–2021: Watford
- 2021–2023: Celtic

Senior career*
Years	Team	Apps	(Gls)
2023–2024	Celtic	0	(0)
2023–2024	→ Fleetwood Town (loan)	42	(6)
2024–	Stoke City	45	(1)

International career^{‡}
- Republic of Ireland U15
2019	Republic of Ireland U17	1	(0)
2021–2022	Republic of Ireland U19	7	(0)
2021–2024	Republic of Ireland U21	12	(1)
2026–	Republic of Ireland	3	(0)
- * Club domestic league appearances and goals as of 20:37, 21 November 2026 (UTC) ‡ National team caps and goals as of 23:30, 14 November 2026 (UTC)

Mohammed Bosun Lawal (born 30 May 2003) is an Irish professional footballer who plays as a defender and midfielder for EFL Championship club Stoke City and the Republic of Ireland national team.

Born in Dublin, he began his career with Corduff FC, St. Kevin's Boys and Bohemians before joining Watford's academy and later Celtic. He made his senior debut for Celtic before spending a season on loan at Fleetwood Town, and joined Stoke City in 2024. He made his senior international debut for the Republic of Ireland in 2026.

== Club career ==
=== Early career ===
Lawal started his football career with local side Corduff FC, where he played alongside fellow future senior Republic of Ireland international Killian Phillips. He later joined top Dublin academy side St. Kevin's Boys before moving on to play with the under-19 side of League of Ireland club Bohemians. He joined English Premier League side Watford in 2019. While at Watford, he was named academy player of the year for the 2020–21 season, and earned praise from then-first team captain Troy Deeney, who compared him to Abdoulaye Doucouré. He was offered a one-year contract by Watford in May 2021, but had attracted interest from Chelsea, Fulham, Norwich City and Scottish side Celtic, with the latter showing the strongest interest. Having rejected the contract offer from Watford, Lawal made the move to Scotland, joining Celtic in July 2021. He was assigned to the club's B team, where he impressed with his performances, and was linked with a transfer away from the club in December 2022.

=== Celtic ===
Lawal was named on the bench for the first team for the first time as Celtic went on to beat St Johnstone 4–1. He made his senior debut on 21 January 2023, coming on as a late substitute in a 5–0 Scottish Cup win against Greenock Morton. On 17 August 2023, Lawal signed a new long-term contract with Celtic until the summer of 2026. That same day he joined EFL League One club Fleetwood Town on a season-long loan deal, where he would be managed by former Celtic captain Scott Brown. Lawal played 46 times for Fleetwood, scoring six goals as he was unable to help them avoid relegation.

=== Stoke City ===
On 12 August 2024, Lawal signed for EFL Championship club Stoke City on a four-year-contract for an undisclosed fee believed to be in the region of £2 million. It was later revealed that during his medical a stress fracture in his lower back was discovered. Lawal was restricted to eight appearances in 2024–25 with his only start coming on the final day of the season, a goalless draw against Derby County which was enough for Stoke to avoid relegation. He scored his first goal for Stoke in a 1–0 victory over Birmingham City on 13 September 2025. In 2025–26, Lawal played more frequently, making 30 appearances but was unavailable for several months due to hamstring injuries.

== International career ==
Lawal has represented the Republic of Ireland from under-15 to under-21 level. On 16 June 2023, he scored his first goal for the Republic of Ireland U21 side in a 2–2 draw against Ukraine. In June 2025, he was called up to the Republic of Ireland senior team for their friendly away to Luxembourg.

On 31 March 2026, Lawal made his senior debut for the Republic of Ireland, replacing Finn Azaz from the bench in the 61st minute of a 0–0 draw with North Macedonia in a friendly at the Aviva Stadium.

== Personal life ==
Lawal was born in Ireland and is of Nigerian descent. He comes from a footballing family: his older brother, Ola, is also a professional footballer, while another brother, Abraham, is a FIFA-licensed football agent. In February 2026, he said that he was living with Ola in England.

A Christian, Lawal attends church every Sunday and occasionally takes part in Bible studies during the week. He also regularly prays with his brothers and friends.

== Career statistics ==
=== Club ===
As of match played 21 November 2026

Appearances and goals by club, season and competition
Club	Season	League			National Cup (Note: Includes Scottish Cup & FA Cup)		League Cup (Note: Includes Scottish League Cup & EFL Cup)		Other		Total	
Club	Season	Division	Apps	Goals	Apps	Goals	Apps	Goals	Apps	Goals	Apps	Goals
Celtic	2021–22	Scottish Premiership	0	0	0	0	0	0	1 (Note: Appearance(s) in Scottish Challenge Cup for Celtic B)	0	1	0
Celtic	2022–23	Scottish Premiership	0	0	1	0	0	0	2	2	3	2
Celtic	2023–24	Scottish Premiership	0	0	0	0	0	0	1	0	1	0
Celtic	Total		0	0	1	0	0	0	4	2	5	2
Fleetwood Town (loan)	2023–24	EFL League One	42	6	2	0	0	0	2 (Note: Appearances in EFL Trophy)	0	46	6
Stoke City	2024–25	EFL Championship	7	0	1	0	0	0	—		8	0
Stoke City	2025–26	EFL Championship	27	1	1	0	2	0	—		30	1
Stoke City	2026–27	EFL Championship	11	0	0	0	2	0	—		13	0
Stoke City	Total		45	1	2	0	4	0	0	0	51	1
Career total			86	7	5	0	4	0	6	2	102	9

=== International ===
As of match played on 14 November 2026

Appearances and goals by national team and year
National team	Year	Apps	Goals
Republic of Ireland
Republic of Ireland	2026	3	0
Total		3	0
