= 2022–23 Burnley F.C. season =

English football club season

Burnley
2022–23 season
- Chairman: Alan Pace
- Manager: Vincent Kompany
- Stadium: Turf Moor
- Championship: 1st (promoted)
- FA Cup: Quarter-finals
- EFL Cup: Fourth round
- Top goalscorer: League: Nathan Tella (17); All: Nathan Tella (19)
- Highest home attendance: 21,747 (v Blackburn Rovers, Championship, 13 November 2022)
- Lowest home attendance: 6,329 (v Crawley Town, EFL Cup, 8 November 2022)
- Average home league attendance: 19,953
Home colours	Away colours	Third colours

The 2022–23 season was the 141st season in the existence of Burnley and the club's first season back in the Championship since 2015–16, following its relegation from the Premier League the previous season. In addition to the league, the team also competed in the FA Cup and EFL Cup.

On 7 April 2023, Burnley secured promotion back to the Premier League with seven matches remaining—a Championship record—following a 2–1 win at Middlesbrough. During the season, the team won 10 league matches in a row, equalling the Championship record. On 25 April, Burnley won the Championship title following a 1–0 victory at main rivals Blackburn Rovers.

== Transfers ==
=== In ===
Date	Pos	Player	Transferred from	Fee	Ref
26 June 2022	AM	(England) Scott Twine	(England) Milton Keynes Dons	£4,000,000	
28 June 2022	CB	(Republic of Ireland) Luke McNally	(England) Oxford United	£2,000,000	
1 July 2022	CB	(England) CJ Egan-Riley	(England) Manchester City	£350,000	
5 July 2022	CM	(Democratic Republic of the Congo) Samuel Bastien	(Belgium) Standard Liège	£685,000	
12 July 2022	CM	(Republic of Ireland) Josh Cullen	(Belgium) Anderlecht	£3,000,000	
22 July 2022	GK	(Kosovo) Arijanet Muric	(England) Manchester City	£3,000,000	
26 July 2022	RW	(England) Seb Thompson	Free agent	Free Transfer	
28 July 2022	RB	(Brazil) Vitinho	(Belgium) Cercle Brugge	Undisclosed	
4 August 2022	RW	(Belgium) Manuel Benson	(Belgium) Antwerp	£3,000,000	
15 August 2022	CM	(Scotland) Frankie Deane	(Scotland) Celtic	Undisclosed	
19 August 2022	LW	(North Macedonia) Darko Churlinov	(Germany) VfB Stuttgart	£4,250,000	
26 August 2022	GK	(Italy) Denis Franchi	(France) Paris Saint-Germain	Undisclosed	
30 August 2022	LW	(Morocco) Anass Zaroury	(Belgium) Charleroi	£3,500,000	
1 September 2022	RB	(Republic of Ireland) Alex Healy-Byrne	(Republic of Ireland) Cork City	Undisclosed	
1 September 2022	AM	(England) Marcel Lewis	(Belgium) Royale Union Saint-Gilloise	Undisclosed	
29 September 2022	CB	(England) Jack Turner	(England) Barking	Undisclosed	
31 October 2022	LW	(Albania) Renaldo Torraj	(England) Tottenham Hotspur	Free Transfer	
23 December 2022	CM	(England) Jez Davies	(England) Tottenham Hotspur	Free Transfer	
13 January 2023	CB	(Belgium) Ameen Al-Dakhil	(Belgium) Sint-Truiden	Undisclosed	
21 January 2023	CB	(Sweden) Hjalmar Ekdal	(Sweden) Djurgårdens IF	£2,400,000	
25 January 2023	CF	(South Africa) Lyle Foster	(Belgium) Westerlo	Undisclosed	
30 January 2023	LW	(Republic of Ireland) Deji Sotona	(France) Nice	Free Transfer	
30 January 2023	LW	(Wales) Tom Tweedy	(Wales) Penybont	Undisclosed	
31 January 2023	RW	(Belgium) Enock Agyei	(Belgium) Anderlecht	Undisclosed	

=== Out ===
Date	Pos	Player	Transferred to	Fee	Ref
23 June 2022	GK	(England) Nick Pope	(England) Newcastle United	£10,000,000	
30 June 2022	GK	(England) Harry Allen	(Wales) Flint Town United	Released	
30 June 2022	RB	(Scotland) Phil Bardsley	(England) Stockport County	Released	
30 June 2022	AM	(Republic of Ireland) Ruairi Behan	Unattached	Released	
30 June 2022	RB	(England) Joel Connolly	(England) Prescot Cables	Released	
30 June 2022	CM	(England) Will Couch	(England) Barnoldswick Town	Released	
30 June 2022	RW	(England) Sean Etaluku	(England) Mossley	Released	
30 June 2022	LB	(England) Anthony Glennon	(England) Grimsby Town	Released	
30 June 2022	CM	(France) Anthony Gomez Mancini	(England) Accrington Stanley	Released	
30 June 2022	RW	(England) Aaron Lennon	Retired	—N/a	
30 June 2022	CB	(England) Calen Gallagher-Allison	(England) Lancaster City	Released	
30 June 2022	CB	(England) Jack Leckie	(England) Hull City	Released	
30 June 2022	CB	(England) Ben Mee	(England) Brentford	Released	
30 June 2022	CF	(Sweden) Joel Mumbongo	(England) Tranmere Rovers	Released	
30 June 2022	CB	(England) Richard Nartey	(England) Salford City	Released	
30 June 2022	LB	(Netherlands) Erik Pieters	(England) West Bromwich Albion	Released	
30 June 2022	CF	(England) Joe Smyth-Ferguson	Unattached	Released	
30 June 2022	CM	(England) Dale Stephens	Unattached	Released	
30 June 2022	CB	(England) James Tarkowski	(England) Everton	Released	
30 June 2022	LW	(England) Sam Unwin	(England) Cheadle Heath Nomads	Released	
30 June 2022	RB	(Wales) Ethen Vaughan	(England) Guiseley	Released	
30 June 2022	LW	(Wales) George Walters	Unattached	Released	
12 July 2022	CB	(Republic of Ireland) Nathan Collins	(England) Wolverhampton Wanderers	£20,500,000	
15 July 2022	GK	(Wales) Wayne Hennessey	(England) Nottingham Forest	Free Transfer	
22 July 2022	RW	(England) Max Thompson	(England) Sunderland	Undisclosed	
28 July 2022	LW	(England) Dwight McNeil	(England) Everton	£20,000,000	
5 August 2022	LW	(Ivory Coast) Maxwel Cornet	(England) West Ham United	£17,500,000	
8 August 2022	CB	(England) Jake Rooney	(England) Derby County	Free Transfer	
9 August 2022	CB	(England) Jacob Bedeau	(England) Morecambe	Undisclosed	
1 September 2022	CM	(England) Adam Phillips	(England) Barnsley	Undisclosed	
5 January 2023	CB	(Republic of Ireland) Kevin Long	(England) Birmingham City	Undisclosed	
7 January 2023	CM	(England) Ashley Westwood	(United States) Charlotte FC	Free Transfer	
12 January 2023	CM	(England) Mark Helm	(England) Burton Albion	Undisclosed	

=== Loans in ===
Date	Pos	Player	Loaned from	On loan until	Ref
1 July 2022	CB	(England) Taylor Harwood-Bellis	(England) Manchester City	End of Season	
15 July 2022	LB	(Netherlands) Ian Maatsen	(England) Chelsea	End of Season	
11 August 2022	RW	(England) Nathan Tella	(England) Southampton	End of Season	
1 September 2022	CB	(Germany) Jordan Beyer	(Germany) Borussia Mönchengladbach	End of Season	
1 September 2022	CF	(Turkey) Halil Dervişoğlu	(England) Brentford	End of Season	
29 January 2023	CF	(Republic of Ireland) Michael Obafemi	(Wales) Swansea City	End of Season	

=== Loans out ===
Date	Pos	Player	Loaned to	On loan until	Ref
28 June 2022	GK	(Denmark) Lukas Jensen	(England) Accrington Stanley	End of Season	
5 July 2022	CF	(Netherlands) Wout Weghorst	(Turkey) Beşiktaş	13 January 2023 (Note: On 13 January, Weghorst was recalled from Beşiktaş to join Man United on loan)	
1 September 2022	AM	(England) Lewis Richardson	(England) Grimsby Town	26 January 2023 (Note: On 26 January, Richardson was recalled from his loan at Grimsby)	
1 September 2022	CB	(England) Bobby Thomas	(England) Bristol Rovers	14 January 2023 (Note: On 14 January, Thomas' loan at Bristol Rovers was terminated and he was loaned to Barnsley)	
8 September 2022	CF	(Scotland) Joe McGlynn	(England) Oldham Athletic	9 October 2022	
13 September 2022	RB	(Northern Ireland) Jacson Coppack	(England) Ramsbottom United	End of Season	
17 September 2022	CM	(England) Kade Ratchford	(England) Bamber Bridge	16 October 2022	
24 September 2022	LB	(England) Finlay Armstrong	(England) FC United of Manchester	31 January 2023 (Note: On 25 October, Armstrong's loan at FC United of Manchester was extended, On 1 January, Armstrong's loan at FC United of Manchester was extended further and On 27 January, the loan was terminated allowing him to join Curzon Ashton on loan)	
6 October 2022	GK	(England) Sam Waller	(England) Lancaster City	End of Season (Note: On 7 November, Waller's loan at Lancaster was extended, On 6 January, Waller's loan at Lancaster was extended further, On 3 February, Waller's loan at Lancaster was extended again until March and then on 7 March, it was extended until the season end)	
7 October 2022	CM	(England) Will Hugill	(England) Leek Town	8 January 2023 (Note: On 7 November, Hugill's loan at Leek was extended.) (Note: On 5 December, Hugill's loan at Leek was extended further.)	
25 October 2022	RB	(Northern Ireland) Jacson Coppack	(England) Padiham	21 November 2022	
25 October 2022	CF	(Scotland) Joe McGlynn	(England) Hyde United	23 November 2022	
4 January 2023	RB	(England) Matthew Lowton	(England) Huddersfield Town	End of Season	
6 January 2023	GK	(England) Harry Moss	(England) Barnoldswick Town	31 January 2023	
6 January 2023	GK	(England) Will Norris	(England) Peterborough United	End of Season	
12 January 2023	CF	(Scotland) Joe McGlynn	(England) Kidderminster Harriers	End of Season	
13 January 2023	LM	(Republic of Ireland) Dara Costelloe	(England) Bradford City	End of Season	
13 January 2023	CF	(Netherlands) Wout Weghorst	(England) Manchester United	End of Season	
14 January 2023	CB	(England) Bobby Thomas	(England) Barnsley	End of Season	
19 January 2023	CF	(Scotland) Michael Mellon	(England) Morecambe	End of Season	
26 January 2023	CB	(Republic of Ireland) Luke McNally	(England) Coventry City	End of Season	
27 January 2023	LB	(England) Finlay Armstrong	(England) Curzon Ashton	26 February 2023	
27 January 2023	LB	(England) Owen Dodgson	(England) Rochdale	End of Season	
27 January 2023	GK	(England) Jon Ander Vilar Robinson	(England) Padiham	5 March 2023 (Note: On 3 February, Robinson's loan at Padiham was extended by a further month)	
30 January 2023	CB	(England) CJ Egan-Riley	(Scotland) Hibernian	End of Season	
31 January 2023	RW	(Belgium) Enock Agyei	(Belgium) Mechelen	End of Season	
10 February 2023	GK	(England) Harry Moss	(England) Padiham	End of Season (Note: On 7 March, Moss' loan at Padiham was extended until the season end)	
26 February 2023	LB	(Northern Ireland) Dane McCullough	(England) Hyde United	End of Season	

== Pre-season and friendlies ==
Win Draw Loss

1 July 2022 Friendly	Burnley	1–0	Rochdale	Padiham
TBA BST	Twine 13'	Report		Stadium: Barnfield Training Centre; Attendance: 0 (behind-closed-doors)

9 July 2022 Friendly	Wolverhampton Wanderers	3–0	Burnley	Compton
TBA BST	Gibbs-White; Podence; Chiquinho	Report		Stadium: Sir Jack Hayward Training Ground; Attendance: 0 (behind-closed-doors)

9 July 2022 Friendly	Burton Albion	Cancelled	Burnley	Burton upon Trent
15:30 BST				Stadium: Pirelli Stadium
Note: Match was cancelled due to a number of reasons beyond control.

15 July 2022 Friendly	Shrewsbury Town	1–3	Burnley	Shrewsbury
19:00 BST	Shipley 46'	Report	Bastien 27'; Tucker 59'; Thomas 84'	Stadium: Montgomery Waters Meadow; Attendance: 1,978

23 July 2022 Friendly	Newcastle United	6–1	Burnley	Lisbon
	Willock (?); Anderson (?); Almirón (?); Ritchie (?); Murphy (?)	Report	Tucker (?)	Stadium: Cidade do Futebol; Attendance: 0 (behind-closed-doors)

23 July 2022 Friendly	Newcastle United	3–1	Burnley	Lisbon
	Saint-Maximin (?); Wilson (?); Almirón (?)	Report	Maatsen (?)	Stadium: Cidade do Futebol; Attendance: 0 (behind-closed-doors)

== Competitions ==
=== Overall record ===
Competition	First match	Last match	Starting round	Final position	Record							
Competition	First match	Last match	Starting round	Final position	Pld	W	D	L	GF	GA	GD	Win %
Championship	29 July 2022	8 May 2023	Matchday 1	Winners	46	29	14	3	87	35	+52	63.04
FA Cup	7 January 2023	18 March 2023	Third round	Quarter-finals	5	3	1	1	7	9	−2	60.00
EFL Cup	23 August 2022	21 December 2022	Second round	Fourth round	3	2	0	1	4	3	+1	66.67
Total					54	34	15	5	98	47	+51	62.96

Source: Soccerway

=== Championship ===
==== League table ====
Pos	Team	Pld	W	D	L	GF	GA	GD	Pts	Promotion, qualification or relegation
1	Burnley (C, P)	46	29	14	3	87	35	+52	101	Promotion to Premier League
2	Sheffield United (P)	46	28	7	11	73	39	+34	91	Promotion to Premier League
3	Luton Town (O, P)	46	21	17	8	57	39	+18	80	Qualification for Championship play-offs
4	Middlesbrough	46	22	9	15	84	56	+28	75	Qualification for Championship play-offs
5	Coventry City	46	18	16	12	58	46	+12	70	Qualification for Championship play-offs
6	Sunderland	46	18	15	13	68	55	+13	69	Qualification for Championship play-offs

Source: EFL Official Website
Rules for classification: 1) Points; 2) Goal difference; 3) Number of goals scored; 4) Head-to-head results; 5) Wins; 6) Away goals; 7) Penalty points (sec 9.5); 8) 12-point sending off offences
(C) Champions; (O) Play-off winners; (P) Promoted

==== Results summary ====
Overall								Home						Away					
Pld	W	D	L	GF	GA	GD	Pts	W	D	L	GF	GA	GD	W	D	L	GF	GA	GD
46	29	14	3	87	35	+52	101	16	6	1	49	15	+34	13	8	2	38	20	+18

Source: Soccerway

==== Results by round ====
Round	1	2	3	4	5	6	7	8	9	10	11	12	13	14	15	16	17	18	19	20	21	22	23	24	25	26	27	28	29	30	31	32	33	34	35	36	37	38	39	40	41	42	43	44	45	46
Ground	A	H	A	H	H	A	H	A	A	H	A	H	A	H	A	A	H	H	H	A	H	A	H	H	A	A	H	H	A	H	H	A	A	H	A	H	A	H	A	H	A	A	H	A	A	H
Result	W	D	L	D	D	W	W	D	D	W	D	D	W	W	D	W	W	W	W	L	W	W	W	W	W	W	W	W	W	W	D	W	D	W	D	W	W	D	W	W	D	D	L	W	W	W
Position	3	3	11	12	16	6	3	5	5	4	4	5	4	1	3	3	1	1	1	1	1	1	1	1	1	1	1	1	1	1	1	1	1	1	1	1	1	1	1	1	1	1	1	1	1	1

Source: Soccerway
A = Away; H = Home; W = Win; D = Draw; L = Loss; P = Postponed

==== Matches ====
Win Draw Loss

29 July 2022 1	Huddersfield Town	0–1	Burnley	Huddersfield
20:00 BST	Kasumu (yellow card) 84'	Report	Maatsen 18'; Cullen (yellow card) 58'; Taylor (yellow card) 66'	Stadium: John Smith's Stadium; Attendance: 20,206; Referee: James Linington
Note: Live on Sky Sports

6 August 2022 2	Burnley	1–1	Luton Town	Burnley
20:00 BST	Brownhill 50'; Barnes (yellow card) 89'; Roberts (yellow card) 90+4'	Report	Potts 5'; Morris (yellow card) 66'	Stadium: Turf Moor; Attendance: 19,628; Referee: Darren Bond

12 August 2022 3	Watford	1–0	Burnley	Watford
20:00 BST	Cleverley 45+2'; Kamara (red card) 81'; Asprilla (yellow card) 88'	Report	Brownhill (yellow card) 85'	Stadium: Vicarage Road; Attendance: 19,225; Referee: Thomas Bramall

16 August 2022 4	Burnley	1–1	Hull City	Burnley
19:45 BST	Rodriguez 34'; Brownhill (yellow card) 89'	Report	Tetteh (yellow card) 11'; Tufan 25'; Jones (yellow card) 68'; Elder (yellow card) 90+6'	Stadium: Turf Moor; Attendance: 18,209; Referee: Bobby Madley

20 August 2022 5	Burnley	3–3	Blackpool	Burnley
15:00 BST	Brownhill 3'; Tella 11', 33'; Cullen (yellow card) 47'; Maatsen (red card) 85'	Report	Corbeanu 21'; Thompson (yellow card) 45+1'; Connolly (yellow card) 61'; Lavery 74'; Yates 76'; Carey (red card) 84'; Dougall (yellow card) 90+5'	Stadium: Turf Moor; Attendance: 20,620; Referee: Keith Stroud

27 August 2022 6	Wigan Athletic	1–5	Burnley	Wigan
15:00 BST	Tilt (yellow card) 2'; Keane 43' (pen.)	Report	Rodriguez 17'; Brownhill 27', 86'; Muric (yellow card) 41'; Tella 51'; Bastien 88'	Stadium: DW Stadium; Attendance: 14,506; Referee: James Bell

30 August 2022 7	Burnley	2–0	Millwall	Burnley
19:45 BST	Vitinho 62'; Rodriguez 72'	Report	Cresswell (yellow card) 18'; Hutchinson (yellow card) 35'; Voglsammer (yellow card) 45+1'	Stadium: Turf Moor; Attendance: 17,689; Referee: Leigh Doughty

2 September 2022 8	West Bromwich Albion	1–1	Burnley	West Bromwich
20:00 BST	Button (yellow card) 29'; Thomas-Asante 90+8'	Report	Rodriguez 30' (pen.); Cork (yellow card) 36'; Harwood-Bellis (yellow card) 50'; Roberts (yellow card) 71'; Taylor (yellow card) 80'	Stadium: The Hawthorns; Attendance: 22,704; Referee: James Linington

13 September 2022 9	Preston North End	1–1	Burnley	Deepdale, Preston
19:45 BST	McCann (yellow card) 4'; Storey 15'; Parrott (yellow card) 33'	Report	Harwood-Bellis 10'	Stadium: Deepdale; Attendance: 20,212; Referee: Peter Bankes

17 September 2022 10	Burnley	2–1	Bristol City	Burnley
15:00 BST	Benson 4'; Rodriguez 67'; Cork (yellow card) 89'	Report	Wells 27'; Scott (yellow card) 32'	Stadium: Turf Moor; Attendance: 19,742; Referee: Oliver Langford

1 October 2022 11	Cardiff City	1–1	Burnley	Leckwith, Cardiff
15:00 BST	Nkounkou (yellow card) 31'; Ng (yellow card) 47'; Kipré (yellow card) 51'; Robinson 90'	Report	Tella 48'	Stadium: Cardiff City Stadium; Attendance: 18,508; Referee: Gavin Ward

5 October 2022 12	Burnley	1–1	Stoke City	Burnley
19:45 BST	Harwood-Bellis (yellow card) 22'; Vitinho (yellow card) 26'; Roberts 54'	Report	Wilmot (yellow card) 64'; Delap (yellow card) 80'; Clarke 87'	Stadium: Turf Moor; Attendance: 18,131; Referee: David Webb

8 October 2022 13	Coventry City	0–1	Burnley	Coventry
15:00 BST	Gyökeres (yellow card) 45+4'	Report	Beyer (yellow card) 22'; Cork (yellow card) 30'; Tella 39'; Maatsen (yellow card) 44'	Stadium: The Coventry Building Society Arena; Attendance: 19,445; Referee: John Busby

15 October 2022 14	Burnley	4–0	Swansea City	Burnley
15:00 BST	Vitinho 15'; Rodriguez 29', 57'; Zaroury 45+3'; Brownhill (yellow card) 61'	Report	Sorinola (yellow card) 23'; Cabango (yellow card) 34'; Fulton (yellow card) 38'; Latibeaudiere (yellow card) 40'; Piroe (red card) 74'	Stadium: Turf Moor; Attendance: 18,728; Referee: Steve Martin

19 October 2022 15	Birmingham City	1–1	Burnley	Bordesley
19:45 BST	Chong (yellow card) 42'; Hogan 80'	Report	Cork (yellow card) 44'; Zaroury (yellow card) 53'; Guðmundsson 74'	Stadium: St. Andrew's Stadium; Attendance: 16,303; Referee: John Busby

22 October 2022 16	Sunderland	2–4	Burnley	Sunderland
19:45 BST	Diallo 16'; Neil 20'; Batth (yellow card) 72'	Report	Guðmundsson (yellow card) 2'; Tella 50'; Harwood-Bellis (yellow card) 52'; Benson 61'; Zaroury 69'; Brownhill (yellow card) 80', (goal) 87'	Stadium: Stadium of Light; Attendance: 37,349; Referee: Tim Robinson

25 October 2022 17	Burnley	1–0	Norwich City	Burnley
20:00 BST	Rodriguez (yellow card) 38', (goal) 82' (pen.); Tella (yellow card) 58'; Cork (yellow card) 76'	Report	Aarons (yellow card) 21'; Hayden (yellow card) 27'; Hanley (yellow card) 58'	Stadium: Turf Moor; Attendance: 18,931; Referee: Tony Harrington

29 October 2022 18	Burnley	2–1	Reading	Burnley
15:00 BST	Harwood-Bellis (yellow card) 22'; Benson 66'; Zaroury 90+4'	Report	Rahman (yellow card) 35'; Ince 56'; Holmes (yellow card) 59'; Loum (yellow card) 72'	Stadium: Turf Moor; Attendance: 18,684; Referee: Jeremy Simpson

2 November 2022 19	Burnley	3–2	Rotherham United	Burnley
19:45 GMT	Rodriguez 35'; Maatsen (yellow card) 89'; Brownhill (yellow card) 89'; Benson 90+1'; Beyer (yellow card) 90+10'; Dervişoğlu 90+10'	Report	Wiles 3', (yellow card) 90'; Ogbene 64'; Bramall (yellow card) 68' (yellow-red card) 75'; Barlaser (yellow card) 90'	Stadium: Turf Moor; Attendance: 17,572; Referee: Leigh Doughty

5 November 2022 20	Sheffield United	5–2	Burnley	Sheffield
12:30 GMT	Stevens (yellow card) 26'; Ndiaye 30'; McBurnie 48', 74', (yellow card) 77'; Robinson 64'; Ahmedhodžić 69'	Report	Benson 17', 45'; Cullen (yellow card) 53'; Tella (yellow card) 77'; Cork (yellow card) 80'	Stadium: Bramall Lane; Attendance: 28,924; Referee: Darren Bond

13 November 2022 21	Burnley	3–0	Blackburn Rovers	Burnley
12:00 GMT	Barnes 55', 81'; Cork (yellow card) 61'; Zaroury 74'	Report	Travis (yellow card) 42'; Ayala (yellow card) 86'	Stadium: Turf Moor; Attendance: 21,747; Referee: David Coote

11 December 2022 22	Queens Park Rangers	0–3	Burnley	Shepherd's Bush
13:00 GMT	Iroegbunam (yellow card) 56'	Report	Guðmundsson 19'; Maatsen 45+2'; Cork (yellow card) 52'; Tella 71'; Cullen (yellow card) 90+2'	Stadium: Loftus Road Stadium; Attendance: 14,299; Referee: Peter Bankes

17 December 2022 23	Burnley	3–1	Middlesbrough	Burnley
15:00 GMT	Benson 60', 67'; Howson 72' (o.g.); Cork (yellow card) 75'; Roberts (red card) 89'	Report	Watmore 49'; Steffen (yellow card) 58'; Akpom (penalty missed) 90'; Lenihan (yellow card) 90+3'	Stadium: Turf Moor; Attendance: 20,603; Referee: David Webb

27 December 2022 24	Burnley	3–0	Birmingham City	Burnley
20:00 GMT	Zaroury 1'; Cullen (yellow card) 35'; Roberts 44'; Tella 90+3'	Report	Mejbri (yellow card) 35'; Chong (yellow card) 36'; Deeney (yellow card) 54'	Stadium: Turf Moor; Attendance: 20,945; Referee: Darren England

30 December 2022 25	Stoke City	0–1	Burnley	Stoke-on-Trent
19:45 GMT	Clarke (yellow card) 45+1'; Baker (yellow card) 89'	Report	Cullen (yellow card) 29', (goal) 61'; Barnes (yellow card) 33'; Maatsen (yellow card) 74'	Stadium: Bet365 Stadium; Attendance: 21,464; Referee: Keith Stroud

2 January 2023 26	Swansea City	1–2	Burnley	Landore
15:00 GMT	Darling (yellow card) 12'; Cooper 27'; Allen (yellow card) 45+2'; Latibeaudiere (yellow card) 79'	Report	Maatsen 13', 22'; Brownhill (yellow card) 41'; Beyer (yellow card) 58'; Guðmundsson (yellow card) 79'; Benson (yellow card) 90+5'; Barnes (yellow card) 90+5'	Stadium: Swansea.com Stadium; Attendance: 17,699; Referee: Oliver Langford

14 January 2023 27	Burnley	1–0	Coventry City	Burnley
15:00 GMT	Cork (yellow card) 11'; Taylor (yellow card) 59'; Tella (yellow card) 81'; Beyer 82'	Report	Norton-Cuffy (yellow card) 50'; Dabo (yellow card) 79'; Wilson (yellow card) 81'	Stadium: Turf Moor; Attendance: 21,290; Referee: David Webb

20 January 2023 28	Burnley	2–1	West Bromwich Albion	Burnley
20:00 GMT	Tella 75'; Twine 87'; Maatsen (yellow card) 90+5'	Report	Furlong 7', (yellow card) 42'	Stadium: Turf Moor; Attendance: 19,890; Referee: Jarred Gillett

4 February 2023 29	Norwich City	0–3	Burnley	Norwich
12:30 GMT	Giannoulis (yellow card) 12'; Omobamidele (yellow card) 16'; Dowell (yellow card) 42'; Núñez (yellow card) 83'; Idah (yellow card) 86'	Report	Zaroury 8'; Brownhill (yellow card) 29'; Barnes (yellow card) 40'; Roberts (yellow card) 45'; Vitinho 54'; Ekdal 60'	Stadium: Carrow Road; Attendance: 26,536; Referee: Keith Stroud

11 February 2023 30	Burnley	3–0	Preston North End	Burnley
15:00 GMT	Tella 15', 55', 58'; Beyer (yellow card) 57'	Report	McCann (yellow card) 28'; Delap (yellow card) 57'; Lindsay (yellow card) 90+2'	Stadium: Turf Moor; Attendance: 21,528; Referee: Darren Bond

14 February 2023 31	Burnley	1–1	Watford	Burnley
20:00 GMT	Roberts (yellow card) 12'; Barnes (yellow card) 58'; Obafemi (yellow card) 90+2', (goal) 90+5'	Report	Pedro 32', (yellow card) 85'; Kamara (yellow card) 35'; Koné (yellow card) 70'	Stadium: Turf Moor; Attendance: 18,393; Referee: Leigh Doughty

18 February 2023 32	Luton Town	0–1	Burnley	Luton
15:00 GMT	Lockyer (yellow card) 77' (yellow-red card) 78'; Adebayo (yellow card) 80'	Report	Brownhill (yellow card) 35'; Barnes 78' (pen.)	Stadium: Kenilworth Stadium; Attendance: 10,066; Referee: Jeremy Simpson

21 February 2023 33	Millwall	1–1	Burnley	Bermondsey
19:45 GMT	Bradshaw (yellow card) 77', (goal) 85'	Report	Al-Dakhil (yellow card) 26'; Barnes 51'	Stadium: The Den; Attendance: 13,542; Referee: James Linington

25 February 2023 34	Burnley	4–0	Huddersfield Town	Burnley
15:00 GMT	Zaroury 7'; Roberts 18'; Brownhill 31'; Obafemi 74'	Report	Koroma (yellow card) 31'; Headley (yellow card) 47'	Stadium: Turf Moor; Attendance: 20,711; Referee: Matt Donohue

5 March 2023 35	Blackpool	0–0	Burnley	Blackpool
15:00 GMT	Connolly (yellow card) 44'	Report	Tella (yellow card) 79'	Stadium: Bloomfield Road; Attendance: 14,134; Referee: Thomas Bramall

11 March 2023 36	Burnley	3–0	Wigan Athletic	Burnley
15:00 GMT	Tella 14', 47'; Foster 76'; Roberts (yellow card) 79'	Report	Rekik (yellow card) 9' (yellow-red card) 28'; Lang (yellow card) 45'; Darikwa (yellow card) 50'; McClean (yellow card) 79'	Stadium: Turf Moor; Attendance: 20,249; Referee: John Busby

15 March 2023 37	Hull City	1–3	Burnley	Kingston upon Hull
19:45 GMT	Pelkas (yellow card) 39'; Tufan 90+3'	Report	Tella 43', 59', 73'; Ekdal (yellow card) 57'; Maatsen (yellow card) 82'	Stadium: MKM Stadium; Attendance: 17,271; Referee: Tim Robinson

31 March 2023 38	Burnley	0–0	Sunderland	Burnley
20:00 GMT	Cullen (yellow card) 53'; Maatsen (yellow card) 58'			Stadium: Turf Moor; Attendance: 21,462; Referee: Jarred Gillett

7 April 2023 39	Middlesbrough	1–2	Burnley	Middlesbrough
20:00 BST	Hackney (yellow card) 38'; Akpom 48' (pen.)	Report	Barnes 12'; Roberts 66'; Obafemi (yellow card) 90+4'	Stadium: Riverside Stadium; Attendance: 30,844; Referee: Darren Bond

10 April 2023 40	Burnley	2–0	Sheffield United	Burnley
20:00 BST	Harwood-Bellis (yellow card) 10'; Gudmundsson 60', 70'	Report	Foderingham (red card) 17'; Egan (yellow card) 28'; Bogle (yellow card) 59'; Ndiaye (yellow card) 73'	Stadium: Turf Moor; Attendance: 21,506; Referee: Michael Salisbury

15 April 2023 41	Reading	0–0	Burnley	Reading
15:00 BST	Carroll (yellow card) 76'; Mbengue (yellow card) 79'; Lumley (yellow card) 90+4'	Report	Cork (yellow card) 89'	Stadium: Select Car Leasing Stadium; Attendance: 19,476; Referee: Oliver Langford

18 April 2023 42	Rotherham United	2–2	Burnley	Rotherham
19:45 BST	Vitinho 45+2' (o.g.); Quina (yellow card) 68'; Kelly 85'	Report	Twine 26'; Maatsen (yellow card) 45+4'; Benson 81'	Stadium: New York Stadium; Attendance: 10,566; Referee: Robert Madley

22 April 2023 43	Burnley	1–2	Queens Park Rangers	Burnley
15:00 BST	Harwood-Bellis (yellow card) 63'; Benson 76'; Twine (yellow card) 90+3'	Report	Field 58'; Armstrong (yellow card) 80'; Martin 87'; Laird (yellow card) 89'	Stadium: Turf Moor; Attendance: 20,027; Referee: Dean Whitestone

25 April 2023 44	Blackburn Rovers	0–1	Burnley	Blackburn
20:00 BST	Rankin-Costello (yellow card) 47'; Pickering (yellow card) 62'; Szmodics (yellow card) 70'	Report	Brownhill (yellow card) 35'; Cullen (yellow card) 53'; Maatsen (yellow card) 57'; Cork (yellow card) 65'; Benson 66'; Muric (yellow card) 85'	Stadium: Ewood Park; Attendance: 18,166; Referee: Tim Robinson

29 April 2023 45	Bristol City	1–2	Burnley	Ashton Gate
15:00 BST	Conway 60'; Weimann (yellow card) 88'	Report	Benson 33'; Rodriguez 62'	Stadium: Ashton Gate Stadium; Attendance: 24,065; Referee: David Webb

8 May 2023 46	Burnley	3–0	Cardiff City	Burnley
15:00 BST	Brownhill 27'; Barnes 31'; Roberts (yellow card) 36'; Twine 57'	Report	Ng (yellow card) 64'; Romeo (yellow card) 87'	Stadium: Turf Moor; Attendance: 21,594; Referee: Matt Donohue

=== FA Cup ===
Win Draw Loss

7 January 2023 Third round	Bournemouth	2–4	Burnley	King's Park
15:00 GMT	Christie 12'; Solanke 48'; Smith (yellow card) 81'	Report	Benson 6', 57'; Zaroury 39', 43'; Churlinov (yellow card) 84'; Cullen (yellow card) 89'	Stadium: Vitality Stadium; Attendance: 10,116; Referee: Tim Robinson

28 January 2023 Fourth round	Ipswich Town	0–0	Burnley	Ipswich
15:00 GMT	Harness (yellow card) 26'; Morsy (yellow card) 71'	Report	Beyer (yellow card) 13'; Cork (yellow card) 88'	Stadium: Portman Road; Attendance: 25,420; Referee: Tom Nield

7 February 2023 Fourth round replay	Burnley	2–1	Ipswich Town	Burnley
19:45 GMT	Tella 2', 90+4'; Cork (yellow card) 33'; Vitinho (yellow card) 36'	Report	Hirst 3', (yellow card) 52'; Aluko (yellow card) 60'; Chaplin (yellow card) 90+7'	Stadium: Turf Moor; Attendance: 11,543; Referee: Scott Oldham

1 March 2023 Fifth round	Burnley	1–0	Fleetwood Town	Burnley
19:30 GMT	Roberts 90'	Report	Andrew (yellow card) 22'; Hayes (red card) 45+1'; Rooney (yellow card) 54'; Vela (yellow card) 90+6'	Stadium: Turf Moor; Attendance: 15,987; Referee: Dean Whitestone

18 March 2023 Quarter-finals	Manchester City	6–0	Burnley	Manchester
18:00 GMT	Haaland 32', 35', 59'; Álvarez 62', 73'; Palmer 68'	Report	Barnes (yellow card) 90+1'	Stadium: Etihad Stadium; Attendance: 51,688; Referee: John Brooks

=== EFL Cup ===
Win Draw Loss

23 August 2022 Second round	Shrewsbury Town	0–1	Burnley	Shrewsbury
19:45 BST	Dacosta (yellow card) 57'; Flanagan (yellow card) 69'	Report	Bastien 50'	Stadium: Montgomery Waters Meadow; Attendance: 3,819; Referee: Bobby Madden

8 November 2022 Third round	Burnley	3–1	Crawley Town	Burnley
19:45 GMT	Barnes 24'; Guðmundsson (yellow card) 51'; Zaroury 79', 90'	Report	Telford 22'	Stadium: Turf Moor; Attendance: 6,329; Referee: Sam Barrott

21 December 2022 Fourth round	Manchester United	2–0	Burnley	Trafford
19:45 GMT	Eriksen 27'; Rashford 57'; Antony (yellow card) 80'; Fernandes (yellow card) 89'	Report	Cullen (yellow card) 48'	Stadium: Old Trafford; Attendance: 62,062; Referee: Graham Scott

== Appearances and goals ==
Numbers in parentheses denote appearances as substitute.
Players with names in italics and marked * were on loan from another club for the whole of their season with Burnley.
Key to positions: GK – Goalkeeper; DF – Defender; MF – Midfielder; FW – Forward

Players contracted for the 2022–23 season
No.	Pos.	Nat.	Name	League		FA Cup		EFL Cup		Total	
No.	Pos.	Nat.	Name	Apps	Goals	Apps	Goals	Apps	Goals	Apps	Goals
2	DF	ENG	Matthew Lowton	0	0	0	0	2	0	2	0
3	DF	ENG	Charlie Taylor	17 (16)	0	4 (1)	0	2 (1)	0	23 (18)	0
4	MF	ENG	Jack Cork	26 (13)	0	2 (2)	0	1	0	29 (15)	0
5	DF	ENG	Taylor Harwood-Bellis *	31 (1)	1	1	0	1 (1)	0	33 (2)	1
6	DF	ENG	CJ Egan-Riley	0 (3)	0	0	0	2 (1)	0	2 (4)	0
7	MF	ISL	Jóhann Berg Guðmundsson	23 (14)	4	2 (2)	0	3	0	28 (16)	4
8	MF	ENG	Josh Brownhill	41	7	2 (2)	0	1 (2)	0	44 (4)	7
9	FW	ENG	Jay Rodriguez	20 (8)	10	1	0	0	0	21 (8)	10
10	FW	ENG	Ashley Barnes	22 (17)	6	1 (2)	0	3	1	26 (19)	7
11	FW	ENG	Scott Twine	5 (9)	3	3	0	0 (1)	0	8 (10)	3
12	FW	RSA	Lyle Foster	4 (7)	1	3 (1)	0	0	0	7 (8)	1
14	DF	WAL	Connor Roberts	39 (4)	4	3 (2)	1	2	0	44 (6)	5
15	GK	NIR	Bailey Peacock-Farrell	5 (3)	0	5	0	3	0	13 (3)	0
17	MF	BEL	Manuel Benson	14 (19)	12	1	2	3	0	18 (19)	14
18	DF	SWE	Hjalmar Ekdal	9	1	0	0	0	0	9	1
19	MF	MAR	Anass Zaroury	27 (7)	7	3 (1)	2	0 (1)	2	30 (9)	11
21	DF	IRL	Luke McNally	0 (2)	0	0 (1)	0	1	0	1 (3)	0
22	DF	BRA	Vitinho	23 (12)	3	4	0	1 (1)	0	28 (13)	3
23	MF	ENG	Nathan Tella *	31 (8)	17	3 (2)	2	0 (1)	0	34 (11)	19
24	MF	IRL	Josh Cullen	43	1	3 (2)	0	2	0	48 (2)	1
26	MF	DRC	Samuel Bastien	7 (11)	1	2 (1)	0	2 (1)	1	11 (13)	2
27	MF	MKD	Darko Churlinov	1 (6)	0	1 (3)	0	1 (1)	0	3 (10)	0
28	DF	BEL	Ameen Al-Dakhil	7 (1)	0	4	0	0	0	11 (1)	0
29	DF	NED	Ian Maatsen *	38 (1)	4	2	0	1	0	41 (1)	4
30	FW	TUR	Halil Dervişoğlu *	0 (8)	1	0 (1)	0	0	0	0 (9)	1
32	MF	ENG	Marcel Lewis	0	0	0	0	0 (1)	0	0 (1)	0
36	DF	GER	Jordan Beyer *	29 (1)	1	4	0	1	0	34 (1)	1
43	MF	ENG	Joe Bauress	0	0	0	0	0 (1)	0	0 (1)	0
44	MF	IRL	Dara Costelloe	3 (1)	0	0	0	1 (1)	0	4 (2)	0
45	FW	IRL	Michael Obafemi *	0 (12)	2	1 (1)	0	0	0	1 (13)	2
49	GK	KVX	Arijanet Muric	41	0	0	0	0	0	41	0

== See also ==
- 2022–23 in English football
- List of Burnley F.C. seasons
