= Finlay Armstrong =

English football

Personal information
- Full name: Finlay Patric Armstrong
- Date of birth: 5 March 2003 (age 23)
- Place of birth: Liverpool, England
- Position: Full back

Youth career
- –2015: Venny Boyz
- 2015–2023: Burnley
- 2023–2024: Fleetwood Town

Senior career*
Years	Team	Apps	(Gls)
2021–2023	Burnley	0	(0)
2022–2023	→ FC United of Manchester (loan)	18	(1)
2023	→ Curzon Ashton (loan)	19	(0)
2023–2024	Fleetwood Town	3	(0)
2023–2024	→ Rochdale (loan)	13	(0)
2024–2025	Rochdale	12	(0)
2025	→ King's Lynn Town (loan)	10	(0)
2025–2026	Waterford	2	(0)
- * Club domestic league appearances and goals as of 19:40, 29 July 2026 (UTC)

Finlay Patric Armstrong (born 5 March 2003) is an English footballer who plays as a full back.

== Career ==
=== Early career ===
Born in Liverpool, Armstrong started his career, for non League club Venny Boyz, then joined the academy of Burnley at under-13s level, progressing through the ranks to sign a professional one-year contract in July 2022. Prior to signing his contract while under scholarship, he spent time on loan with Padiham and Clitheroe. During the 2022–23 season, he was loaned out to FC United of Manchester and Curzon Ashton.

=== Fleetwood Town ===
On 30 June 2023, Armstrong joined League One club Fleetwood Town on a one-year deal, joining the club's development squad. He made his debut for the club on 5 September 2023, featuring as a first-half substitute in an EFL Trophy victory over Tranmere Rovers. In December 2023, he joined National League club Rochdale on a one-month loan deal. He was released by Fleetwood at the end of the 2023–24 season.

=== Rochdale ===
On 6 June 2024, Armstrong agreed to return to Rochdale on a permanent two-year deal upon the expiration of his contract with Fleetwood.

On 24 January 2025, Armstrong joined National League North side King's Lynn Town on an initial one-month loan deal.

=== Waterford ===
On 8 July 2025, Armstrong signed an 18 month contract with League of Ireland Premier Division club Waterford. On 29 July 2026, it was announced that he had departed the club, almost a year after the last of his 3 appearances, due to a long term injury.

== Personal life ==
Armstrong is the older brother of Everton midfielder Harrison Armstrong.

== Career statistics ==
As of match played on 3 August 2025

Appearances and goals by club, season and competition
Club	Season	League			National Cup (Note: Includes FA Cup & FAI Cup)		League Cup (Note: Includes EFL Cup & National League Cup)		Other		Total	
Club	Season	Division	Apps	Goals	Apps	Goals	Apps	Goals	Apps	Goals	Apps	Goals
Burnley	2022–23	Championship	0	0	0	0	0	0	0	0	0	0
FC United of Manchester (loan)	2022–23	NPL Premier Division	18	1	0	0	—		2 (Note: One appearance in FA Trophy, one appearance in Manchester Premier Cup)	0	20	1
Curzon Ashton (loan)	2022–23	National League North	19	0	0	0	—		0	0	19	0
Fleetwood Town	2023–24	League One	1	0	0	0	0	0	2 (Note: Appearance(s) in EFL Trophy)	0	3	0
Rochdale (loan)	2023–24	National League	13	0	0	0	—		0	0	13	0
Rochdale	2024–25	National League	12	0	0	0	3	0	0	0	15	0
King's Lynn Town (loan)	2024–25	National League North	10	0	—		—		—		10	0
Waterford	2025	LOI Premier Division	2	0	1	0	—		0	0	3	0
Waterford	2026	LOI Premier Division	0	0	0	0	—		0	0	0	0
Waterford	Total		2	0	1	0	—		0	0	3	0
Career total			74	1	1	0	3	0	4	0	82	1
