= Sam Bird (footballer) =

English footballer (born 2003)

Personal information
- Full name: Samuel David Bird
- Date of birth: 18 September 2002 (age 24)
- Place of birth: England
- Position: Defender

Team information
- Current team: Chorley
- Number: 18

Youth career
- –2021: Fleetwood Town

Senior career*
Years	Team	Apps	(Gls)
2021–2023	Fleetwood Town	0	(0)
2021	→ Farsley Celtic (loan)	2	(0)
2022	→ Hyde United (loan)	5	(0)
2023–2024	Stockport County	0	(0)
2023–2024	→ Stafford Rangers (loan)	22	(1)
2024	Stirling Albion	0	(0)
2024–	Chorley	27	(1)
2025	→ Widnes (loan)	11	(0)
2025–2026	→ Ilkeston Town (loan)	9	(0)
- * Club domestic league appearances and goals as of 12:22, 26 April 2026 (UTC)

Samuel David Bird (born 12 March 2003) is an English professional footballer who plays as a defender for National League North club Chorley.

== Career ==
Bird progressed through the Academy at Fleetwood Town and signed his first professional contract with the club on 26 April 2021, signing a deal until the 2021–22 season, with the option of a further year in the club's favour. He had been an ever-present for the under-18 side over the campaign, scoring a memorable goal in the FA Youth Cup Fourth Round against Bristol City.

He signed on loan for National League North side Farsley Celtic on a month-long deal, following a spate of injuries and suspensions for their defence. Bird had impressed Farsley manager, Adam Lakeland, when playing against Fleetwood in a pre-season friendly weeks earlier and the two clubs had a strong relationship having loaned quite a few players of the past couple of years.

On 31 December 2021, he signed a new one-year extended contract with the club until June 2023, again with another year option in the club's favour. He had made the step-up to the first team for the 2021–22 campaign and made his debut against Barrow in the EFL Trophy on 5 October, replacing Chiekh Thiam as a substitute. His full debut came weeks later in the same competition as Fleetwood lost 1–0 to Bolton Wanderers. He also made the bench on a number of occasions for matches in EFL League One since then.

On 28 January 2022, he signed for Northern Premier League Premier Division side Hyde United for his second loan deal of the season, for an initial one month.

After leaving Fleetwood, Bird signed for Stockport County in summer 2023. He spent a loan spell at Stafford Rangers, joining in August 2023, and leaving in January 2024, having made 26 appearances in all competitions. Later that month he signed for Scottish club Stirling Albion.

In July 2024, Bird joined National League North club Chorley.

== Career statistics ==
As of match played 22 February 2022

Appearances and goals by club, season and competition
Club	Season	League			FA Cup		League Cup		Other		Total	
Club	Season	Division	Apps	Goals	Apps	Goals	Apps	Goals	Apps	Goals	Apps	Goals
Fleetwood Town	2021–22	League One	0	0	0	0	0	0	2 (Note: Appearance in EFL Trophy)	0	2	0
Fleetwood Town	2022–23	League One	0	0	0	0	0	0	0	0	0	0
Fleetwood Town	Total		0	0	0	0	0	0	2	0	2	0
Farsley Celtic (loan)	2021–22	National League North	2	0	—		—		—		2	0
Hyde United (loan)	2021–22	NPL Premier Division	5	0	—		—		1 (Note: Appearance in Manchester Premier Cup)	0	6	0
Career total			7	0	0	0	0	0	3	0	10	0
