= Chorley F.C. =

English football club

Chorley
- Full name: Chorley Football Club
- Nickname: The Magpies
- Founded: 1883; 143 years ago
- Ground: Victory Park
- Capacity: 4,300 (975 seated)
- Chairman: Jamie Vermiglio
- Manager: Vacant
- League: National League North
- 2025–26: National League North, 15th of 24
- Website: chorleyfc.com
Home colours	Away colours

Chorley Football Club is a semi-professional football club based in Chorley, Lancashire, England. They currently compete in the National League North, the sixth tier of English football, and play their home matches at Victory Park. The club was founded as a rugby union club in 1875 but switched to football in 1883.

Their best performance in the FA Cup was in 2020–21 when they reached the fourth round after a 2–0 win against Derby County in the third round, having previously reached the second round twice in 1986–87 and 1990–91. Their best performance in the FA Trophy was in 1995–96 when they reached the semi-finals.

The club's home colours are black and white stripes, hence the nickname the Magpies.

== History ==
=== 19th century ===
Archibald Pinnell, goalkeeper for Chorley in the 1890s.

Chorley Football Club was formed in 1883 after switching from rugby to football. In 1875 Chorley Football Club began partly as the brainchild of one Major John Lawrence, a Wigan player who had conceived the idea a year earlier. The inauguration took place on 15 October in the now demolished Anchor Inn in Market Street, Chorley. At that gathering Major Lawrence was elected the club's first captain. Henry Hibbert, who was to become one of the most famous figures ever connected with the town as Member of Parliament for Chorley, took on the role of secretary. James Lawrence became the club treasurer.

After playing rugby for seven years, pressure was on Chorley to switch to playing football instead, and in 1883 the switch was made.

Chorley joined the Lancashire Junior League in 1889, and the following year became a member of the Lancashire Alliance, a league which they were crowned champions of in 1892–93 and runners-up in 1893–94. In 1894 Chorley joined the Lancashire League, becoming champions twice in 1896–97 and 1898–99.

The Lancashire Junior Cup came to Chorley in 1894, nine years after the trophy's institution, and their win was the first of a record number of successes for the Magpies. They beat Clitheroe 3–2 in a replayed final at Ewood Park, Blackburn after a 2–2 draw. Chorley bid farewell to the Lancashire Alliance at the end of the 1893–94 season and joined the Lancashire League, winning the championship in 1896–97 which also saw them sell former Bolton Wanderers attacker Jack Lyden to Wolverhampton Wanderers for £100 (around £6,000 in today's money), a substantial fee for a non-league player considering that this was eight years prior to the first £1,000 transfer deal.

Chorley won another championship in 1898–99, but was clouded by a notice to quit their Dole Lane Ground, and the loss of captain Johnny Parker, who had broken his leg. In May 1899 Chorley applied to join the Football League's Second Division, coming sixth in voting, with the top two being elected.

=== 20th century ===
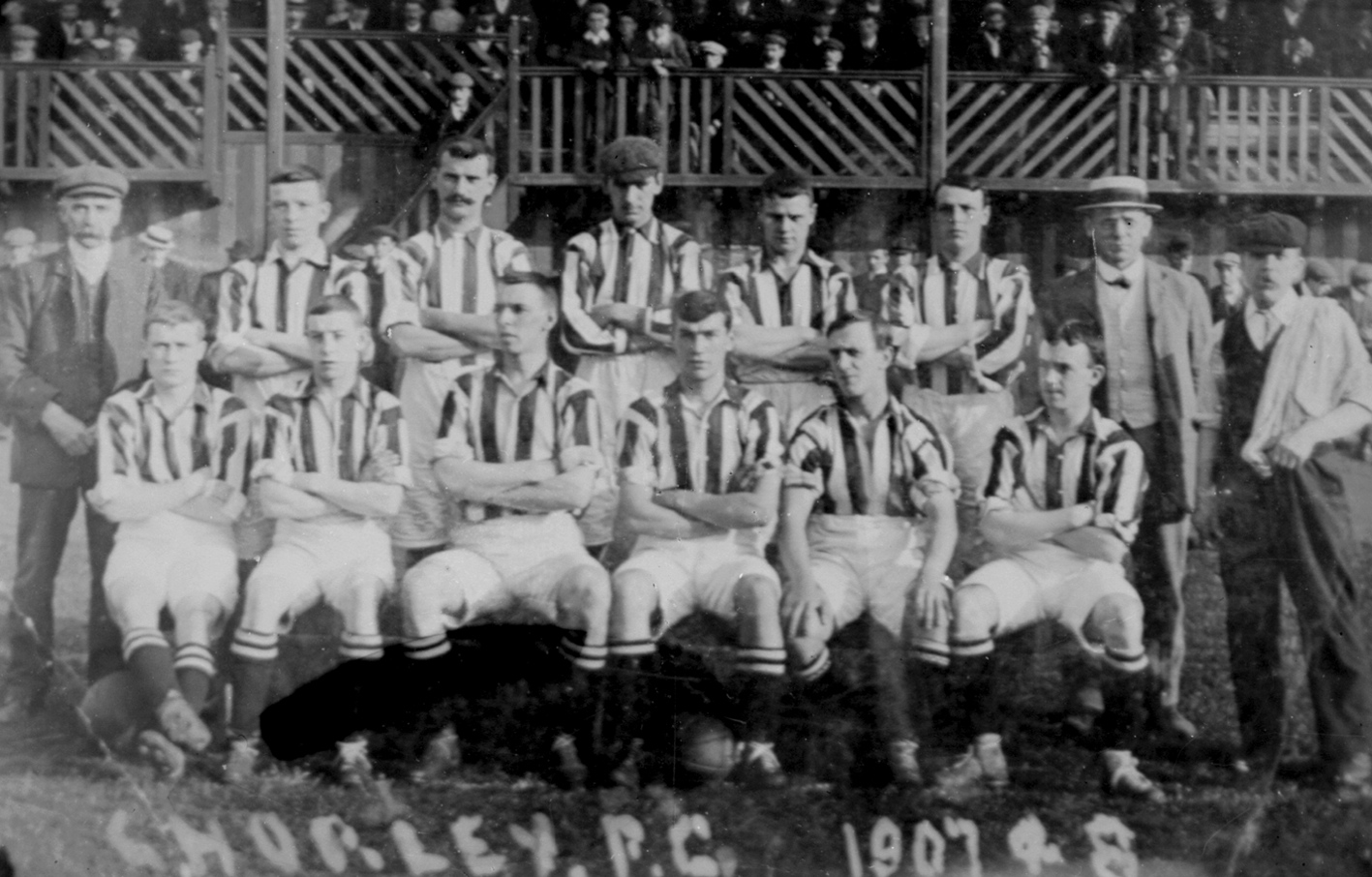
Chorley team in the 1907–08 season.

1923 Lancashire Combination-winning Chorley team.

September 1901 saw Chorley move to the Rangletts Ground, taking even the grandstand and hoardings, and 1903 saw the Lancashire League restructured as the Lancashire Combination, which was extended in size to encompass two divisions, A and B, with Chorley playing in the Combination B Division. Life at the Rangletts Ground was short lived, with Chorley being evicted in 1904, and relocated to nearby St. George's Park. The 1904–05 season saw Chorley finish their highest position – fifth – for six years.

Chorley suffered their worst season in 1914–15, finishing bottom of the league, but the outbreak of the First World War saved them from relegation, for the Combination, like the Football League, suspended its competitions in 1915. During the war Chorley joined the Northern Division but due to difficulties in raising a team they were disbanded early in 1916. Chorley did not have a team for the next two seasons, but in August 1918 formed a side for friendly matches. After the re-formation of the Combination S. Heaton became the club chairman, Charlie Holgate the secretary, and T.J. "Dod" Gaskell the treasurer.

Chorley took their place in the reassembled Combination (there was only one division by now) with what proved to be one of their finest-ever teams. The 1920s were to bring a phrase of glory and the team was among the honours for ten successive seasons. But the beginning of one era coincided with the end of another. Just 14 years after playing their first home game at St. Georges Park, Chorley announced in August 1919 that they had acquired a new ground. It was to come into use the following year and was to be a truly permanent home. The ground, situated in Duke Street and adjoining Rangletts Recreation Ground, a former Magpie base, was named Victory Park to commemorate the end of the war.

Chorley did not achieve notable success in any league until the 1919–20 season when they were crowned champions of the Lancashire Combination First Division, a league they won a total of eleven times between 1919 and 1964.

In 1968–69 Chorley were one of the founder members of the Northern Premier League, left at the end of the season, and rejoined in the 1970–71 season. Chorley joined the Cheshire League in the 1972–73 season, finishing as runners-up in 1975–76, and another two times in 1976–77 and 1981–82.

Chorley rejoined the Northern Premier League in 1982–83, and became champions in 1987–88, which saw them promoted to the Football Conference – the fifth tier of the English football league system. Chorley spent two seasons in the Conference before being relegated back to the Northern Premier League in 1990–91.

=== 21st century ===
Chorley spent the first ten years of the 21st century in the Northern Premier League Division 1, the 8th tier of English Football (divided into the Northern Premier League North and Northern Premier League South in 2007). They almost invariably finished each season in the bottom half of the league table during this period, though they did finish fifth at the end of the 2002–03 season and qualified for the promotion play-offs, losing to Radcliffe Borough in the final. Chorley achieved promotion to the Northern Premier League Premier Division at the end of the 2010–11 season, finishing 3rd and going on to beat AFC Fylde 2–0 in the play-off final.

After spending three seasons in the Northern Premier League Premier Division, Chorley achieved a further promotion as 2013-14 league champions, moving up to the Conference North (6th tier of English Football).

In their first season in the Conference North, Chorley came close to achieving consecutive promotions when they finished fourth and reached the promotion play-off final, but lost 3–2 to Guiseley. At the end of that season manager Garry Flitcroft stepped down from his post and was replaced by assistant manager, Matt Jansen.

The Football Conference was renamed as the National League at the start of the 2015–16 season and Chorley finished eighth in the National League North. The following season they again reached the play-off final, losing 2–1 to FC Halifax Town after extra-time.

The 2017–18 season saw Chorley reach the promotion play-offs yet again, but they were beaten 2–1 by Harrogate Town in the semi-finals. Before the beginning of the 2018–19 season manager Matt Jansen left his post and was replaced by his assistant, Jamie Vermiglio

Chorley started the 2018–19 season by winning their first seven league matches and remaining unbeaten for their first twelve. They spent the majority of the season at the top of the table, but were overtaken right at the end by Stockport County, who won the title by one point, with Chorley finishing second. In their play-off semi-final, with the score 1–1 after extra-time, Chorley beat Altrincham 3–1 on penalties. The score in the final between Chorley and Spennymoor Town, at Victory Park, Chorley, was 0–0 after 90 minutes. Chorley went 1–0 up in extra-time but Spennymoor quickly equalised and so the contest went to a penalty shoot-out, which Chorley won 4–3, thereby achieving promotion to the National League, the 5th tier of English Football.

In the first round of the 2020–21 FA Cup, as a sixth-tier club they defeated League One side and 2013 champions Wigan Athletic. In the second round, they beat another League One side, Peterborough United. Chorley would go on to the third round to defeat EFL Championship side Derby County with a 2–0 victory and was drawn to face Premier League side Wolverhampton Wanderers at home in the fourth round, which subsequently saw Chorley's FA Cup run come to an end with a 0–1 defeat.

== Financial irregularities ==
In October 2011 a Chorley F.C. official was arrested and bailed on suspicion of stealing over £50,000 from the club. As a result of this the club was forced to delay payment to players and launched a campaign to save the club with the help of local businesses.

In March 2013 Ian Daniels pleaded guilty at Preston Crown Court to charges relating to the theft from the club. His codefendant, former club accountant Philip Haslam, had already pleaded guilty a few weeks earlier. Both men received custodial sentences

== Colours ==
As a rugby club, Chorley wore blue and white, probably in hoops. The club has been wearing black and white stripes at least since 1898.

== Stadium ==
Chorley play at Victory Park. The ground has a capacity of 4,300, of which 2,800 is covered standing and 900 is covered seating.

Construction of Victory Park was completed in 1920 at a cost of £1,000. The stadium was named to commemorate the end of the First World War. The ground was very different from the Victory Park of today, as both ends of the ground were exposed to the weather and there was no concrete terracing. The grandstand was a modest wooden structure with accommodation for 600. Chorley, with the aid of £654 raised by a special bazaar, bought Victory Park in 1926 for £868. The Supporters' Club provided £100.

In November 1945 a fire broke out and destroyed the main wooden stand shortly after it had been vacated following an FA Cup tie against Accrington Stanley, which had been attended by a crowd of 4,019. The stand was practically destroyed and gutted all but the dressing rooms, and the efforts of firemen could not prevent the loss of valuable property, equipment and playing kit. Work on the new grandstand began in 1947, costing £5,500 – five and a half times the price of the original one.

== Statistics and records ==
Peter Watson holds the record for the highest number of goals scored in a single season with 71 (57 league goals) in the 1960–61 season. Peter Watson also holds the highest aggregate goalscorer record of 372 (287 league, 85 cup) between September 1958 and February 1966.

The club's widest victory margin was their 14–1 home win against Morecambe in April 1946. Their widest victory margin during wartime was 16–0 against Leyland Motors in September 1944.

Chorley's record attendance was 15,153 v Preston North End in the FA Cup, played at Ewood Park, home of Blackburn Rovers on 6 December 1986. At Victory Park Chorley's record attendance was 9,679 in an FA Cup 4th qualifying round match against Darwen on 15 November 1932.

== Players ==
=== Current squad ===
As of 5 October 2026

Note: Flags indicate national team as defined under FIFA eligibility rules; some limited exceptions apply. Players may hold more than one non-FIFA nationality.

No.	Pos.	Nation	Player
1	GK	ENG	Li-Bau Stowell (on loan from Preston North End)
2	DF	WAL	Adam Henley
3	DF	ENG	Mark Ellis
4	DF	ENG	Scott Wilson
5	DF	ENG	Harvey Smith
6	DF	ENG	Max Hunt
7	MF	ENG	Billy Whitehouse
8	MF	ENG	Mike Calveley (captain)
9	FW	ENG	Jack Sampson
11	MF	ENG	Warren Clarke
12	MF	NIR	Max Wilson (on loan from Preston North End)
14	MF	ENG	George Horbury
16	DF	ENG	Adam Blakeman

No.	Pos.	Nation	Player
17	MF	ENG	Callum Rowe
18	DF	ENG	Sam Bird
19	MF	ENG	Jack Hazlehurst
20	MF	ALB	Steven Bala (on loan from AB)
21	FW	BER	Kole Hall
22	FW	ENG	Elliot Taylor
25	MF	ENG	Sam Fielding
26	DF	ENG	Jack Moore
27	FW	NGR	Anjola Popoola (on loan from Accrington Stanley)
29	FW	ENG	Jacob Cummins
31	MF	ENG	Jake Dennett
32	DF	ENG	Jayden Kay
33	GK	ENG	Kier Barry

=== Out on loan ===
Note: Flags indicate national team as defined under FIFA eligibility rules; some limited exceptions apply. Players may hold more than one non-FIFA nationality.

No.	Pos.	Nation	Player
10	FW	ENG	Lewis Salmon (on loan to Alfreton Town)
24	MF	ENG	Noel Brindle (on loan to 1874 Northwich)

No.	Pos.	Nation	Player
30	MF	ENG	Fin Denning (on loan to Colne)

== Club officials ==
As of 18 March 2024

Technical Staff
Chairman	Jamie Vermiglio (England)
Chief Executive	Terry Robinson (England)
Manager	Vacant
Assistant Manager	Chris Anderson (England)
Goalkeeping Coach	Steven Drench (England)
Strength & Conditioning Coach	Christian Hughes (New Zealand)
Head Physio	Daniel Tattersall (England)
Tannoy Spokesman	David Gillett

== Notable former players ==
Players who played for Chorley who also received at least one international cap for their country:

- Mickey Walsh – Republic of Ireland international, and winner of 1975 BBC Goal of the Season.
- Paul Mariner – England international and winner of the FA Cup and UEFA Cup.
- Tommy Lawrence – Scotland international and winner of the England First Division, the FA Cup and Charity Shield.
- Frank Worthington – England international and scorer of over 250 goals in club football.
- Adam Henley – Wales international, capped twice for The Dragons.
- Steve Jones – Northern Ireland international, 29 caps and 1 goal for The Green Army.
- David Moyo – Zimbabwe international, 5 caps for The Warriors.
- Kole Hall – Bermuda international, 16 caps & 3 goals for The Gombey Warriors.

== Records ==
- Best FA Cup performance: Fourth round, 2020–21
- Best FA Trophy performance: Semi-finals, 1995–96

== Honours ==
- National League North
  - Play-off winners: 2019
- Northern Premier League
  - Champions: 1987–88, 2013–14
  - Division One play-off winners: 2011
- Lancashire Combination
  - Champions: 1919–20, 1922–23, 1927–28, 1928–29, 1932–33, 1933–34, 1939–40, 1945–46, 1959–60, 1960–61, 1963–64
  - Runners-up: 1921–22, 1926–27, 1948–49, 1962–63, 1964–65, 1965–66
- Cheshire League
  - Runners-up: 1975–76, 1976–77, 1981–82
- Lancashire League
  - Champions: 1896–97, 1898–99
- Lancashire FA Trophy
  - Winners: 1894, 1909, 1924, 1940, 1946, 1958, 1959, 1961, 1964, 1965, 1976, 1980, 1982, 1983, 2012, 2015, 2016, 2018
  - Runners-up: 2008, 2014
