= Brendan Wiredu =

English footballer (born 1999)

Personal information
- Full name: Brendan Nana Akwasi Sarpong Wiredu
- Date of birth: 7 November 1999 (age 27)
- Place of birth: Tower Hamlets, England
- Height: 1.92 m (6 ft 4 in)
- Positions: Midfielder; full-back; wing-back

Team information
- Current team: Salford City
- Number: 44

Youth career
- –2018: Charlton Athletic

Senior career*
Years	Team	Apps	(Gls)
2018–2021	Charlton Athletic	0	(0)
2019	→ Bromley (loan)	11	(0)
2019	→ Colchester United (loan)	7	(0)
2021–2022	Colchester United	58	(2)
2022–2025	Fleetwood Town	107	(6)
2025–2026	Plymouth Argyle	37	(2)
2026–	Salford City	10	(1)
- * Club domestic league appearances and goals as of 18 October 2026 (UTC)

Brendan Nana Akwasi Sarpong Wiredu (born 7 November 1999) is an English professional footballer who plays as a midfielder for EFL League Two club Salford City.

== Career ==
=== Charlton Athletic ===
Wiredu, who can play as a midfielder, full-back or wing-back, made his debut for Charlton Athletic on 14 August 2018, coming on as a substitute for Albie Morgan in a 3–0 EFL Trophy defeat to Milton Keynes Dons. On 1 May 2019, his contract was extended until 2021.

On 8 February 2019, he joined Bromley on loan until 9 March. His loan was later extended until the end of the season.

Wiredu then joined Colchester United on loan until January 2020. He returned to Charlton on 3 January 2020.

=== Colchester United ===
On 1 February 2021, Wiredu joined Colchester United on a permanent basis having previously spent time on loan with the club. He scored his first professional goal in Colchester's 2–2 draw with Tranmere Rovers on 23 March 2021. On 5 July, he signed a two-year contract extension with the club.

=== Fleetwood Town ===
On 21 June 2022, Wiredu joined Fleetwood Town on a three-year deal.

=== Plymouth Argyle ===
On 4 July 2025, Wiredu joined Plymouth Argyle on a three-year deal. On 2 August, Wiredu made his league debut for Argyle, scoring an own goal in a 3–1 loss to Barnsley. Ten days later, he scored his first goal for the club in a 3–2 victory over Queens Park Rangers at Home Park in the first round of the EFL Cup.

=== Salford City ===
Wiredu signed with League Two club Salford City on a "multi-year" contract on 21 August 2026 for an undisclosed fee.

== Personal life ==
Born in London, Wiredu is of Ghanaian descent. He attended St Saviours primary school in Poplar and Bishop Challoner Catholic Collegiate Secondary School in Shadwell.

== Career statistics ==
As of match played 5 September 2026

Appearances and goals by club, season and competition
Club	Season	League			FA Cup		League Cup		Other		Total	
Club	Season	Division	Apps	Goals	Apps	Goals	Apps	Goals	Apps	Goals	Apps	Goals
Charlton Athletic	2018–19	League One	0	0	2	0	1	0	1 (Note: Appearance(s) in EFL Trophy)	0	4	0
Charlton Athletic	2019–20	Championship	0	0	1	0	1	0	0	0	2	0
Charlton Athletic	2020–21	League One	0	0	0	0	0	0	0	0	0	0
Charlton Athletic	Charlton Athletic total		0	0	3	0	2	0	1	0	6	0
Bromley (loan)	2018–19	National League	11	0	—		—		—		11	0
Colchester United (loan)	2019–20	League Two	7	0	0	0	—		3	0	10	0
Colchester United	2020–21	League Two	20	1	—		—		—		20	1
Colchester United	2021–22	League Two	38	1	2	1	1	0	4	0	45	2
Colchester United	Colchester United total		65	2	2	1	1	0	7	0	75	3
Fleetwood Town	2022–23	League One	37	1	6	0	2	0	2	1	47	2
Fleetwood Town	2023–24	League One	36	3	2	0	0	0	1	0	39	3
Fleetwood Town	2024–25	League Two	34	2	0	0	3	0	0	0	37	2
Fleetwood Town	Fleetwood Town total		107	6	8	0	5	0	3	1	123	7
Plymouth Argyle	2025–26	League One	36	2	0	0	2	2	4	0	42	4
Plymouth Argyle	2026–27	League One	1	0	0	0	0	0	0	0	1	0
Plymouth Argyle	Plymouth Argyle total		37	2	0	0	2	2	4	0	43	4
Salford City	2026–27	League Two	4	0	0	0	0	0	0	0	4	0
Career total			224	10	13	1	10	2	15	1	262	14
