= Promise Omochere =

Irish footballer

Personal information
- Full name: Promise Osazee Omochere
- Date of birth: 18 October 2000 (age 26)
- Place of birth: Dublin, Ireland
- Height: 1.87 m (6 ft 2 in)
- Position: Striker

Team information
- Current team: Southend United (on loan from Bristol Rovers)
- Number: 14

Youth career
- –2017: St Joseph's Boys
- 2017: UCD
- 2018: Bohemians

Senior career*
Years	Team	Apps	(Gls)
2018–2022	Bohemians	48	(10)
2022–2024	Fleetwood Town	62	(11)
2024–	Bristol Rovers	37	(6)
2026–	→ Southend United (loan)	9	(5)
- * Club domestic league appearances and goals as of 25 October 2026 (UTC)

Promise Osazee Omochere (born 18 October 2000) is an Irish professional football player who plays as a forward for National League club Southend United, on loan from EFL League Two club Bristol Rovers.

== Career ==
=== Bohemians ===
Omochere joined the Bohemians senior team in 2018 after spending time with their academy. He scored his first league goal for the club in May 2021 in a 5–1 victory against Dundalk.

In March 2022, Republic of Ireland U21 manager Jim Crawford revealed that he had been contacted by a number of clubs in England regarding Omochere.

=== Fleetwood Town ===
On 21 July 2022, Omochere joined League One club Fleetwood Town for an undisclosed fee on a three-year deal. He made his debut for the club on the opening day of the 2022–23 season in a 2–1 defeat to Port Vale, having to be substituted off due to a fractured eye socket suffered in an aerial duel. It took Omochere until the 1 January 2023, his eighteenth game in all competitions, to open his account for the club, scoring the second in a 3–0 victory over Shrewsbury Town.

=== Bristol Rovers ===
On 19 July 2024, Omochere returned to League One following Fleetwood Town's relegation, joining Bristol Rovers on a three-year deal with the option for a further season. Although the fee remained undisclosed, it was widely reported to be in the region of £500,000, making him a club-record signing for Rovers who had fought off competition from Barnsley and Wrexham for his signature. Having made his debut on the opening day of the season, he opened his goalscoring account for the club in his fifth appearance, scoring both goals in a 2–0 victory over Cambridge United. Following a spell out of the first-team due to a number of different injuries, Omochere scored a third goal for the club with a late equaliser against Wrexham on 21 December 2024. Having suffered a hamstring injury in a New Year's Day defeat to Leyton Orient, he was once again ruled out for an expected period of three months. Following a short return to first-team action in early March, he was forced off once again with a hamstring injury just eight minutes into his first start, missing the remainder of the season as the Gas were relegated.

During the early stages of the 2025–26 season, Omochere found himself being utilised out wide as opposed to through the middle as he had been during his first season with the club, achieving a career first of playing ninety minutes in five consecutive matches. In October 2025, he was forced off in a 4–0 defeat to Crawley Town, ruling him out until February 2026. In just his second match back however, he suffered a further injury. He made his return to first-team football on 18 April 2026, scoring his side's first goal in a 2–1 victory over Tranmere Rovers just five minutes after coming on as a substitute.

==== Southend United (loan) ====
On 2 September 2026, Omochere joined National League club Southend United on loan until the end of the 2026–27 season.

== Personal life ==
Omochere studied business and law at Maynooth University.

== Career statistics ==
As of end of 2025–26 season

Club	Season	Division	League		National Cup (Note: Includes FAI Cup & FA Cup)		League Cup (Note: Includes League of Ireland Cup & EFL Cup)		Other		Total	
Club	Season	Division	Apps	Goals	Apps	Goals	Apps	Goals	Apps	Goals	Apps	Goals
Bohemians	2018	LOI Premier Division	2	0	0	0	1	0	0	0	3	0
Bohemians	2019	LOI Premier Division	0	0	0	0	0	0	0	0	0	0
Bohemians	2020	LOI Premier Division	6	0	2	1	–		0	0	8	1
Bohemians	2021	LOI Premier Division	18	5	3	0	–		0	0	21	5
Bohemians	2022	LOI Premier Division	22	5	–		–		–		22	5
Bohemians	Total		48	10	5	1	1	0	0	0	54	11
Fleetwood Town	2022–23	League One	28	5	4	2	1	0	1 (Note: Appearance in the EFL Trophy)	0	34	7
Fleetwood Town	2023–24	League One	34	6	1	0	1	0	1	0	37	6
Fleetwood Town	Total		62	11	5	2	2	0	2	0	73	13
Bristol Rovers	2024–25	League One	22	4	0	0	1	0	1	0	24	4
Bristol Rovers	2025–26	League Two	15	2	0	0	0	0	0	0	15	2
Bristol Rovers	Total		37	6	0	0	1	0	1	0	39	6
Career total			147	26	10	3	4	0	3	0	164	30
