= Chiekh Thiam =

English footballer (born 2001)

Personal information
- Full name: Chiekh Mbeye Thiam
- Date of birth: 16 November 2001 (age 24)
- Place of birth: Verbania, Italy
- Height: 1.78 m (5 ft 10 in)
- Position: Defender

Team information
- Current team: Avro

Youth career
- Shrewsbury Town

Senior career*
Years	Team	Apps	(Gls)
2019–2020	Mossley	7	(0)
2019	→ New Mills (dual-reg)	2	(0)
2019–2020	→ Stockport Town (dual-reg)	17	(1)
2020–2021	Stockport Town	7	(0)
2021–2023	Fleetwood Town	3	(0)
2023	FC United of Manchester	6	(0)
2023	Warrington Rylands	6	(0)
2023	Wythenshawe Town	1	(0)
2024–	Avro	31	(0)
- * Club domestic league appearances and goals as of 13:53, 6 August 2024 (UTC)

Chiekh Mbeye Thiam (born 16 November 2001) is an Italian professional footballer who plays as a defender for Avro.

== Career ==
Thiam was born in Italy and is of Senegalese descent. He signed for Northern Premier League Division One North West side Mossley at the start of the 2019–20 season having impressed during pre-season. He had previously been a youth player at Shrewsbury Town before playing men's football for Manchester Central. In October 2019, he signed dual-registration forms with North West Counties Football League Division One South side New Mills. He then attended The Manchester College where he completed the Football Scholarship Programme, having been influenced by Carlos Mendes Gomes who had previously played football for the college and subsequently signed for Football League side Morecambe. Alongside studying at the college, he also played for North West Counties Football League side Stockport Town, where he was named Manager Player of the Season for 2019–20. During this time he was invited for a trial with National League side Stockport County and it was during one of trial games against Ipswich Town that he was spotted by the Fleetwood Town Academy Manager.

On 22 June 2021, he signed for EFL League One side Fleetwood Town on a two-year deal with the option of another year in the club's favour and immediately joined the Development Squad managed by Stephen Crainey. He made his professional debut for Fleetwood on 5 October 2021 in the 3–1 win over Barrow in the EFL Trophy.

In August 2023, Thiam joined non-league club F.C. United of Manchester. He moved to Warrington Rylands 1906 in October of the same year.

In August 2024, Thiam agreed to return to Avro having ended the previous campaign with the club.

== Career statistics ==
As of match played 16 September 2023

Appearances and goals by club, season and competition
Club	Season	League			FA Cup		League Cup		Other		Total	
Club	Season	Division	Apps	Goals	Apps	Goals	Apps	Goals	Apps	Goals	Apps	Goals
Mossley	2019–20	NPL Division One North-West	7	0	0	0	—		2 (Note: One appearance in the FA Trophy, one appearance in Manchester Premier Cup.)	0	9	0
New Mills (dual-reg)	2019–20	NWCFL Division One South	2	0	—		—		3 (Note: Two appearances in the Derbyshire Senior Cup, one in NWCFL Challenge Cup)	0	5	0
Stockport Town (dual-reg)	2019–20	NWCFL Division One South	17	1	—		—		1 (Note: Appearance in the Cheshire Senior Cup)	0	18	1
Stockport Town	2020–21	NWCFL Division One South	7	0	—		—		2 (Note: Appearances in the FA Vase)	0	9	0
Fleetwood Town	2021–22	League One	3	0	0	0	0	0	2 (Note: Appearances in the EFL Trophy)	0	5	0
FC United of Manchester	2023–24	NPL Premier Division	6	0	1	0	—		0	0	7	0
Wythenshawe Town	2023–24	NWCFL Premier Division	1	0	—		—		—		1	0
Career total			43	1	1	0	0	0	10	0	54	1
