= 2024–25 Everton F.C. season =

English football club season

Everton
2024–25 season
- Owner: Farhad Moshiri (until 19 December 2024); The Friedkin Group (from 19 December 2024)
- Chairman: Dan Friedkin
- Manager: Sean Dyche (until 9 January 2025); Leighton Baines and Séamus Coleman (joint-caretaker, from 9 to 11 January 2025); David Moyes (from 11 January 2025)
- Stadium: Goodison Park
- Premier League: 13th
- FA Cup: Fourth round
- EFL Cup: Third round
- Top goalscorer: League: Iliman Ndiaye (9); All: Iliman Ndiaye (11)
- Highest home attendance: 39,358 vs Chelsea (22 December 2024, Premier League)
- Lowest home attendance: 33,842 vs Southampton (17 September 2024, EFL Cup)
- Average home league attendance: 39,173
- Biggest win: 4–0 v Wolverhampton Wanderers (4 December 2024, Premier League); 4–0 v Leicester City (1 February 2025, Premier League)
- Biggest defeat: 0–4 v Tottenham Hotspur (24 August 2024, Premier League); 0–4 v Manchester United (1 December 2024, Premier League)
| Home colours | Away colours | Third colours |

The 2024–25 season was the 147th season in the history of Everton Football Club, and the club's 71st consecutive season in the top flight of English football. In addition to the domestic league, the club also participated in the FA Cup and the EFL Cup.

This was the club's final season at Goodison Park, as they moved to the new Hill Dickinson Stadium for the 2025–26 season.

Sean Dyche left by mutual consent on 9 January 2025, with the club sitting in 16th place. Leighton Baines and player captain Séamus Coleman were named as joint caretaker managers. Two days later, David Moyes was confirmed as his replacement, returning to the club after twelve years.

== Kits ==
| Home | Home Alt. | Home Alt. 2 | Away |

| Away Alt. 1 | Away Alt. 2 | Third |

== Transfers ==
=== In ===
| Date | Pos. | Player | From | Fee | Ref. |
|---|---|---|---|---|---|
| 22 June 2024 | CM | (England) Tim Iroegbunam | (England) Aston Villa | £9,000,000 | |
| 2 July 2024 | CF | (Wales) Omari Benjamin (Note: Signed initially for the Under-21s) | (England) Arsenal | Free | |
| 3 July 2024 | AM | (Senegal) Iliman Ndiaye | (France) Marseille | £15,000,000 | |
| 30 July 2024 | CB | (Republic of Ireland) Jake O'Brien | (France) Lyon | £16,000,000 | |
| 13 August 2024 | CB | (England) William Tamen | (England) Burton Albion | Undisclosed | |
| 23 August 2024 | GK | (Bosnia and Herzegovina) Asmir Begović | (England) Queens Park Rangers | Free | |
| 30 August 2024 | MF | (The Gambia) Francis Gomez | (Nigeria) Sporting Supreme | Undisclosed | |
| 16 September 2024 | CF | (England) Justin Clarke (Note: Signed initially for the Under-18s) | (England) AFC Wimbledon | Undisclosed | |
| Total | | | | £40,000,000 | |

=== Out ===
| Date | Pos. | Player | To | Fee | Ref. |
|---|---|---|---|---|---|
| 23 June 2024 | FW | (England) Lewis Dobbin | (England) Aston Villa | £10,000,000 | |
| 28 June 2024 | DF | (England) Ben Godfrey | (Italy) Atalanta | £10,000,000 | |
| 22 July 2024 | MF | (Belgium) Amadou Onana | (England) Aston Villa | £50,000,000 | |
| 30 August 2024 | CM | (Italy) Halid Djankpata | (Italy) Spezia | Undisclosed | |
| 13 January 2025 | AM | (England) Charlie Whitaker | (England) Notts County | Free | |
| 31 January 2025 | RW | (England) Stanley Mills | (England) Oxford United | Undisclosed | |
| Total | | | | £70,000,000 | |

=== Loaned in ===
| Date | Pos. | Player | From | Date until | Ref. |
|---|---|---|---|---|---|
| 1 July 2024 (Note: The loan was announced on 24 June, and would officially commence on 1 July.) | MF | (England) Jack Harrison | (England) Leeds United | End of season | |
| 26 July 2024 | MF | (Denmark) Jesper Lindstrøm | (Italy) Napoli | End of season | |
| 30 August 2024 | CM | (Belgium) Orel Mangala | (France) Lyon | End of season | |
| 31 August 2024 | ST | (Albania) Armando Broja | (England) Chelsea | End of season | |
| 4 February 2025 | CM | (Argentina) Carlos Alcaraz | (Brazil) Flamengo | End of Season | |

=== Loaned out ===
| Date | Pos. | Player | To | Date until | Ref. |
|---|---|---|---|---|---|
| 9 August 2024 | CM | (England) Tyler Onyango | (England) Stockport County | 8 January 2025 (Note: On 8 January, Onyango was recalled from his loan at Stockport due to a hamstring injury.) | |
| 27 August 2024 | GK | (England) Harry Tyrer | (England) Blackpool | End of Season | |
| 29 August 2024 | CB | (England) Elijah Campbell | (Scotland) Ross County | End of Season | |
| 30 August 2024 | GK | (England) Billy Crellin | (England) Accrington Stanley | End of Season | |
| 30 August 2024 | CB | (Jamaica) Mason Holgate | (England) West Bromwich Albion | End of Season | |
| 30 August 2024 | CF | (France) Neal Maupay | (France) Marseille | End of Season | |
| 30 August 2024 | CM | (England) Jenson Metcalfe | (England) Chesterfield | End of Season | |
| 30 August 2024 | CF | (England) Francis Okoronkwo | (England) Salford City | End of Season | |
| 30 August 2024 | MF | (The Gambia) Francis Gomez | (France) Lyon | 7 February 2025 (Note: Gomez was recalled from loan for undisclosed reasons.) | |
| 6 September 2024 | CB | (England) Reece Welch | (Belgium) Deinze | January 2025 (Note: Welch returned to Everton following the bankruptcy of K.M.S.K. Deinze.) | |
| 3 February 2025 | CM | (England) Harrison Armstrong | (England) Derby County | End of Season | |
| 3 February 2025 | CB | (England) Bradley Moonan | (England) Prescot Cables | End of Season | |

=== Released / Out of contract ===
| Date | Team | Pos. | Player | Subsequent club | Join date | Ref. |
|---|---|---|---|---|---|---|
| 30 June 2024 | Under-21s | FW | (England) Katia Kouyaté | (England) Barrow | 1 July 2024 | |
| 30 June 2024 | First team | GK | (England) Andy Lonergan | (England) Wigan Athletic | 1 July 2024 | |
| 30 June 2024 | Under-21s | GK | (Northern Ireland) Dylan Graham | (Northern Ireland) Larne | 3 July 2024 | |
| 30 June 2024 | Under-21s | DF | (United Arab Emirates) Mackenzie Hunt | (England) Fleetwood Town | 4 July 2024 | |
| 30 June 2024 | Under-21s | GK | (England) Jack Barrett | (England) Blackburn Rovers | 16 July 2024 | |
| 30 June 2024 | Under-21s | MF | (England) Lewis Warrington | (England) Leyton Orient | 16 July 2024 | |
| 30 June 2024 | Under-21s | DF | (England) Kyle John | (England) Port Vale | 9 August 2024 | |
| 30 June 2024 | First team | MF | (Portugal) André Gomes | (France) Lille | 6 September 2024 | |
| 30 June 2024 | Under-21s | DF | (England) Matthew Mallon | (England) Nantwich Town | 12 October 2024 | |
| 30 June 2024 | First team | MF | (England) Dele Alli (Note: As part of his recovery process, Alli was allowed to use Finch Farm and participate in Everton's pre-season.) | (Italy) Como 1907 | 19 January 2025 | |
| 30 June 2024 | Under-21s | DF | (England) Edward Jones | | | |
| 30 June 2024 | Under-18s | GK | (Denmark) Sebastian Jensen | (England) Brighton & Hove Albion | 7 January 2025 | |
| 30 June 2024 | Under-18s | DF | (England) Daniel Maher | | | |

== Pre-season and friendlies ==
On 6 June, Everton confirmed three pre-season friendlies versus Salford City, Coventry City and Preston North End. A month later, a trip to Ireland was announced to face Sligo Rovers. On 14 July, a home friendly against Serie A side Roma was announced.

Win Draw Loss Fixtures

| 19 July 2024 Friendly | Sligo Rovers | 3–3 | Everton | Sligo, Ireland |
| 16:00 IST | Pearce 35'; McDonagh 41'; Muldoon 57' | Report | Holgate 53'; Chermiti 84', 86' | Stadium: The Showgrounds |

| 27 July 2024 Friendly | Salford City | 2–1 | Everton | Salford |
| 15:00 BST | Woodburn 69'; Chesters 87' | Report | Garner 50' | Stadium: Moor Lane; Attendance: 4,217 |

| 30 July 2024 Friendly | Coventry City | 3–0 | Everton | Coventry |
| 19:45 BST | Simms 21'; Mason-Clark 62'; Torp 76' | Report | McNeil (yellow card) 67' | Stadium: Coventry Building Society Arena; Attendance: 17,439 |

| 3 August 2024 Friendly | Preston North End | 0–3 | Everton | Preston |
| 15:00 BST | | Report | Calvert-Lewin 19' (pen.); O'Brien; Lindstrøm | Stadium: Deepdale |

| 6 August 2024 Friendly | Everton | 6–0 | Motherwell | Liverpool |
| 12:00 BST | Beto 34', 88'; O'Brien 54'; Armstrong 57'; Maupay 60', 73' | Report | | Stadium: Goodison Park; Attendance: 0 (Behind closed doors) |

| 10 August 2024 Friendly | Everton | 1–1 | Roma | Liverpool |
| 17:00 BST | Calvert-Lewin 61' | Report | Pellegrini 39' | Stadium: Goodison Park; Attendance: 31,324; Referee: Michael Salisbury (England) |

== Competitions ==
=== Overall record ===
| Competition | First match | Last match | Starting round | Final position | Record | | | | | | | |
| Competition | First match | Last match | Starting round | Final position | Pld | W | D | L | GF | GA | GD | Win % |
|---|---|---|---|---|---|---|---|---|---|---|---|---|
| Premier League | 17 August 2024 | 25 May 2025 | Matchday 1 | 13th | 38 | 11 | 15 | 12 | 42 | 44 | −2 | 28.95 |
| FA Cup | 9 January 2025 | 8 February 2025 | Third round | Fourth round | 2 | 1 | 0 | 1 | 2 | 2 | +0 | 50.00 |
| EFL Cup | 27 August 2024 | 17 September 2024 | Second round | Third round | 2 | 1 | 1 | 0 | 4 | 1 | +3 | 50.00 |
| Total | | | | | 42 | 13 | 16 | 13 | 48 | 47 | +1 | 30.95 |

Source: Soccerway

=== Premier League ===
==== League table ====
| Pos | Team | Pld | W | D | L | GF | GA | GD | Pts | Qualification or relegation |
|---|---|---|---|---|---|---|---|---|---|---|
| 11 | Fulham | 38 | 15 | 9 | 14 | 54 | 54 | 0 | 54 | |
| 12 | Crystal Palace | 38 | 13 | 14 | 11 | 51 | 51 | 0 | 53 | Qualification for the Conference League play-off round (Note: Since the winners of the 2024–25 EFL Cup, Newcastle United, qualified for the Champions League via league position, the spot reserved for the EFL Cup winners (Conference League play-off round) was initially passed to the 7th-placed team (Nottingham Forest). However due to multi-club ownership rules, the winners of the FA Cup, Crystal Palace, were not permitted to enter the Europa League and entered the Conference League play-off round instead, with Nottingham Forest taking their place in the Europa League. Crystal Palace appealed the decision but this was ultimately rejected.) |
| 13 | Everton | 38 | 11 | 15 | 12 | 42 | 44 | −2 | 48 | |
| 14 | West Ham United | 38 | 11 | 10 | 17 | 46 | 62 | −16 | 43 | |
| 15 | Manchester United | 38 | 11 | 9 | 18 | 44 | 54 | −10 | 42 | |

Source: Premier League
Rules for classification: 1) Points; 2) Goal difference; 3) Goals scored; 4) If the champions, relegated teams or qualified teams for UEFA competitions cannot be determined by rules 1 to 3, rules 4.1 to 4.3 are applied – 4.1) Points gained in head-to-head record between such teams; 4.2) Away goals scored in head-to-head record between such teams; 4.3) Play-offs

==== Results summary ====
| Overall | | | | | | | | Home | | | | | | Away | | | | | |
| Pld | W | D | L | GF | GA | GD | Pts | W | D | L | GF | GA | GD | W | D | L | GF | GA | GD |
|---|---|---|---|---|---|---|---|---|---|---|---|---|---|---|---|---|---|---|---|
| 38 | 11 | 15 | 12 | 42 | 44 | −2 | 48 | 5 | 9 | 5 | 26 | 23 | +3 | 6 | 6 | 7 | 16 | 21 | −5 |

Source: Soccerway

==== Results by round ====
| Round | 1 | 2 | 3 | 4 | 5 | 6 | 7 | 8 | 9 | 10 | 11 | 12 | 13 | 14 | 16 | 17 | 18 | 19 | 20 | 21 | 22 | 23 | 24 | 15^{1} | 25 | 26 | 27 | 28 | 29 | 30 | 31 | 32 | 33 | 34 | 35 | 36 | 37 | 38 |
|---|---|---|---|---|---|---|---|---|---|---|---|---|---|---|---|---|---|---|---|---|---|---|---|---|---|---|---|---|---|---|---|---|---|---|---|---|---|---|
| Ground | H | A | H | A | A | H | H | A | H | A | A | H | A | H | A | H | A | H | A | H | H | A | H | H | A | H | A | A | H | A | H | A | H | A | H | A | H | A |
| Result | L | L | L | L | D | W | D | W | D | L | D | D | L | W | D | D | D | L | L | L | W | W | W | D | W | D | D | D | D | L | D | W | L | L | D | W | W | W |
| Position | 20 | 20 | 20 | 20 | 19 | 16 | 16 | 16 | 16 | 16 | 16 | 15 | 15 | 15 | 16 | 15 | 15 | 16 | 16 | 16 | 16 | 16 | 16 | 15 | 14 | 14 | 16 | 15 | 15 | 15 | 15 | 13 | 13 | 15 | 14 | 13 | 13 | 13 |
| Points | 0 | 0 | 0 | 0 | 1 | 4 | 5 | 8 | 9 | 9 | 10 | 11 | 11 | 14 | 15 | 16 | 17 | 17 | 17 | 17 | 20 | 23 | 26 | 27 | 30 | 31 | 32 | 33 | 34 | 34 | 35 | 38 | 38 | 38 | 39 | 42 | 45 | 48 |

Source: Premier League
A = Away; H = Home; W = Win; D = Draw; L = Loss; P = Postponed
Notes:
- ^{1} Matchday 15 (v. Liverpool) was postponed on safety grounds after Storm Darragh.

==== Matches ====
The league fixtures were released on 18 June 2024.

Win Draw Loss Fixtures

| 17 August 2024 1 | Everton | 0–3 | Brighton & Hove Albion | Liverpool |
| 15:00 BST | Young (red card) 66'; Tarkowski (yellow card) 77' | Report | Mitoma 25'; Milner (yellow card) 31'; Welbeck 56'; Adingra 87' | Stadium: Goodison Park; Attendance: 39,217; Referee: Simon Hooper |

| 24 August 2024 2 | Tottenham Hotspur | 4–0 | Everton | Tottenham |
| 15:00 BST | Bissouma 14'; Son Heung-min 25', 77'; Romero 71' | Report | | Stadium: Tottenham Hotspur Stadium; Attendance: 61,357; Referee: Anthony Taylor |

| 31 August 2024 3 | Everton | 2–3 | Bournemouth | Liverpool |
| 15:00 BST | Keane 50', (yellow card) 76'; Calvert-Lewin 57'; Iroegbunam (yellow card) 90+2' | Report | Semenyo (yellow card) 76', (goal) 87'; Cook 90+2'; Sinisterra 90+6' | Stadium: Goodison Park; Attendance: 38,805; Referee: Stuart Attwell |

| 14 September 2024 4 | Aston Villa | 3–2 | Everton | Birmingham |
| 17:30 BST | Watkins 36', 58'; Martínez (yellow card) 47'; Durán 76' | Report | Ndiaye (yellow card) 15'; McNeil 16'; Iroegbunam (yellow card) 19'; Calvert-Lewin 27'; Young (yellow card) 79'; O'Brien (yellow card) 88' | Stadium: Villa Park; Attendance: 41,920; Referee: Craig Pawson |
Note: Fixture was initially scheduled for a 15:00 kick-off, but was moved for live Sky Sports broadcast.

| 21 September 2024 5 | Leicester City | 1–1 | Everton | Leicester |
| 15:00 BST | Mavididi 73'; Buonanotte (yellow card) 77' | Report | Ndiaye 12'; Keane (yellow card) 46'; Garner (yellow card) 80' | Stadium: King Power Stadium; Attendance: 31,765; Referee: Darren England |

| 28 September 2024 6 | Everton | 2–1 | Crystal Palace | Liverpool |
| 15:00 BST | McNeil 47', 54'; Calvert-Lewin (yellow card) 84'; Pickford (yellow card) 90+3' | Report | Guéhi 10' | Stadium: Goodison Park; Attendance: 38,954; Referee: Andrew Madley |

| 5 October 2024 7 | Everton | 0–0 | Newcastle United | Liverpool |
| 17:30 BST | McNeil (yellow card) 44' | Report | Gordon (penalty missed) 35'; Hall (yellow card) 84'; Schär (yellow card) 90+3' | Stadium: Goodison Park; Attendance: 39,265; Referee: Craig Pawson |
Note: Fixture was initially scheduled for a 15:00 kick-off, but was moved for live Sky Sports broadcast.

| 19 October 2024 8 | Ipswich Town | 0–2 | Everton | Ipswich |
| 15:00 BST | Taylor (yellow card) 90+3' | Report | Ndiaye 17'; Keane (yellow card) 24', (goal) 40' | Stadium: Portman Road; Attendance: 29,862; Referee: Michael Oliver |

| 26 October 2024 9 | Everton | 1–1 | Fulham | Liverpool |
| 17:30 BST | Tarkowski (yellow card) 76'; Beto 90+4' | Report | Iwobi 61' | Stadium: Goodison Park; Attendance: 38,742; Referee: John Brooks |
Note: Fixture was initially scheduled for a 15:00 kick-off, but was moved for live Sky Sports broadcast.

| 2 November 2024 10 | Southampton | 1–0 | Everton | Southampton |
| 15:00 GMT | Bednarek (yellow card) 76'; Fernandes (yellow card) 82'; Dibling (yellow card) 84'; Armstrong 85'; Onuachu (yellow card) 90+8' | Report | Tarkowski (yellow card) 24'; Keane (yellow card) 56' | Stadium: St Mary's Stadium; Attendance: 31,143; Referee: Andrew Madley |

| 9 November 2024 11 | West Ham United | 0–0 | Everton | Stratford |
| 15:00 GMT | Coufal (yellow card) 88' | Report | Gueye (yellow card) 76'; Young (yellow card) 85' | Stadium: London Stadium; Attendance: 62,463; Referee: Stuart Attwell |

| 23 November 2024 12 | Everton | 0–0 | Brentford | Liverpool |
| 15:00 GMT | | Report | Nørgaard (red card) 41' | Stadium: Goodison Park; Attendance: 38,915; Referee: Chris Kavanagh |

| 1 December 2024 13 | Manchester United | 4–0 | Everton | Trafford |
| 13:30 GMT | Rashford 34', 46'; Zirkzee 41', 64'; Mainoo (yellow card) 49'; Martínez (yellow card) 51' | Report | Mykolenko (yellow card) 39'; Gueye (yellow card) 57'; Young (yellow card) 67' | Stadium: Old Trafford; Attendance: 73,817; Referee: John Brooks |
Note: Fixture was initially scheduled for 30 November, but was moved for due to Manchester United in UEFA Europa League action on the preceding Thursday.

| 4 December 2024 14 | Everton | 4–0 | Wolverhampton Wanderers | Liverpool |
| 19:30 GMT | Young 10'; Mangala 33', (yellow card) 35'; Dawson 49', 72' (o.g.); Armstrong (yellow card) 90+1' | Report | | Stadium: Goodison Park; Attendance: 38,820; Referee: Michael Salisbury |
Note: Fixture was initially scheduled for 3 December, but was moved for live Amazon Prime Video broadcast.

| 14 December 2024 16 | Arsenal | 0–0 | Everton | Holloway |
| 15:00 GMT | | Report | Young (yellow card) 72'; Pickford (yellow card) 77'; Broja (yellow card) 81' | Stadium: Emirates Stadium; Attendance: 60,176; Referee: Craig Pawson |

| 22 December 2024 17 | Everton | 0–0 | Chelsea | Liverpool |
| 14:00 GMT | Ndiaye (yellow card) 40'; Pickford (yellow card) 45+1'; Young (yellow card) 57'; Beto (yellow card) 88' | Report | Disasi (yellow card) 82' | Stadium: Goodison Park; Attendance: 39,358; Referee: Chris Kavanagh |
Note: Fixture was initially scheduled for 21 December, but was moved due to Chelsea's involvement in the UEFA Conference League on the Thursday prior.

| 26 December 2024 18 | Manchester City | 1–1 | Everton | Manchester |
| 12:30 GMT | Silva 14'; Haaland (penalty missed) 53'; Foden (yellow card) 90+4' | Report | Ndiaye 36'; Mykolenko (yellow card) 42'; Coleman (yellow card) 52'; Mangala (yellow card) 79'; Branthwaite (yellow card) 87' | Stadium: City of Manchester Stadium; Attendance: 52,527; Referee: Simon Hooper |
Note: Fixture was initially scheduled for a 15:00 kick-off, but was moved for live Amazon Prime Video broadcast.

| 29 December 2024 19 | Everton | 0–2 | Nottingham Forest | Liverpool |
| 15:00 GMT | Tarkowski (yellow card) 8'; Gueye (yellow card) 47'; Branthwaite (yellow card) 54'; Pickford (yellow card) 65' | Report | Wood 15'; Gibbs-White 61'; Boly (yellow card) 70' | Stadium: Goodison Park; Attendance: 39,352; Referee: Tony Harrington |

| 4 January 2025 20 | Bournemouth | 1–0 | Everton | Bournemouth |
| 15:00 GMT | Brooks 77', (yellow card) 90+3'; Adams (yellow card) 89' | Report | Branthwaite (yellow card) 2'; Doucouré (yellow card) 83' | Stadium: Dean Court; Attendance: 11,223; Referee: John Brooks |

| 15 January 2025 21 | Everton | 0–1 | Aston Villa | Liverpool |
| 19:30 GMT | Gueye (yellow card) 52'; Pickford (yellow card) 54' | Report | Onana (yellow card) 8'; Watkins 51' | Stadium: Goodison Park; Attendance: 39,085; Referee: Sam Barrott |
Note: Fixture was initially scheduled for 14 January, but was moved for live TNT Sports broadcast.

| 19 January 2025 22 | Everton | 3–2 | Tottenham Hotspur | Liverpool |
| 14:00 GMT | Calvert-Lewin 13', (yellow card) 42'; Ndiaye 30'; Gray 45+7' (o.g.); Doucouré (yellow card) 67' | Report | Bergvall (yellow card) 40'; Kulusevski 77'; Richarlison 90+2' | Stadium: Goodison Park; Attendance: 39,326; Referee: Darren England |
Note: Fixture was initially scheduled for 18 January, but was moved for live Sky Sports broadcast.

| 25 January 2025 23 | Brighton & Hove Albion | 0–1 | Everton | Falmer |
| 15:00 GMT | Verbruggen (yellow card) 41'; Baleba (yellow card) 45+2'; João Pedro (yellow card) 83'; Minteh (yellow card) 90+10' | Report | Lindstrøm (yellow card) 28'; Ndiaye 42' (pen.), (yellow card) 43'; Pickford (yellow card) 71'; O'Brien (yellow card) 90+10' | Stadium: Falmer Stadium; Attendance: 31,567; Referee: Tim Robinson |

| 1 February 2025 24 | Everton | 4–0 | Leicester City | Liverpool |
| 15:00 GMT | Doucouré 1'; Beto 6', 45+2'; Ndiaye 90' | Report | | Stadium: Goodison Park; Attendance: 39,376; Referee: Darren Bond |

| 12 February 2025 15 | Everton | 2–2 | Liverpool | Liverpool |
| 19:30 GMT | Beto 11'; Lindstrøm (yellow card) 35'; Gueye (yellow card) 37'; Doucouré (yellow card) 45+3' (yellow-red card) 90+14'; Tarkowski 90+8' | Report | Mac Allister 16'; Robertson (yellow card) 27'; Bradley (yellow card) 45+2'; Jones (yellow card) 63' (yellow-red card) 90+13'; Salah 73' | Stadium: Goodison Park; Attendance: 39,280; Referee: Michael Oliver |
Note: Fixture was initially scheduled for a 15:00 kick-off on 7 December, but was moved for live TNT Sports broadcast, and later postponed due to Storm Darragh. Doucouré and Jones both received red cards following the end of the match.

| 15 February 2025 25 | Crystal Palace | 1–2 | Everton | Selhurst |
| 17:30 GMT | Mateta 47' | Report | Beto 42'; Garner (yellow card) 67'; Alcaraz 80' | Stadium: Selhurst Park; Attendance: 25,108; Referee: Anthony Taylor |
Note: Fixture was initially scheduled for a 15:00 kick-off, but was moved for live Sky Sports broadcasting.

| 22 February 2025 26 | Everton | 2–2 | Manchester United | Liverpool |
| 12:30 GMT | Beto 19'; Doucouré 33'; O'Brien (yellow card) 45+3'; Garner (yellow card) 63'; Young (yellow card) 79'; Gueye (yellow card) 90+9' | Report | Fernandes 72'; Ugarte 80'; Obi (yellow card) 90' | Stadium: Goodison Park; Attendance: 39,290; Referee: Andrew Madley |
Note: Fixture was initially scheduled for a 15:00 kick-off, but was moved for live TNT Sports broadcasting.

| 26 February 2025 27 | Brentford | 1–1 | Everton | Brentford |
| 19:30 GMT | Wissa 45+4'; Yarmolyuk (yellow card) 80'; Collins (yellow card) 90+1' | Report | O'Brien 77'; Alcaraz (yellow card) 88' | Stadium: Brentford Community Stadium; Attendance: 17,082; Referee: Simon Hooper |
Note: Fixture was initially scheduled for a 19:45 kick-off, but was moved for live TNT Sports broadcasting.

| 8 March 2025 28 | Wolverhampton Wanderers | 1–1 | Everton | Wolverhampton |
| 20:00 GMT | Munetsi 40'; André (yellow card) 53'; Larsen (yellow card) 62' | Report | Harrison 33'; Iroegbunam (yellow card) 79'; Alcaraz (yellow card) 85' | Stadium: Molineux Stadium; Attendance: 30,738; Referee: Stuart Attwell |
Note: Fixture was initially scheduled for a 15:00 kick-off, but was moved for live TNT Sports broadcasting.

| 15 March 2025 29 | Everton | 1–1 | West Ham United | Liverpool |
| 15:00 GMT | Chermiti (yellow card) 85'; O'Brien 90+1' | Report | Todibo (yellow card) 45+2'; Souček 67'; Paquetá (yellow card) 81' | Stadium: Goodison Park; Attendance: 39,343; Referee: Darren Bond |

| 2 April 2025 30 | Liverpool | 1–0 | Everton | Liverpool |
| 20:00 GMT | Jota 57', (yellow card) 64'; Núñez (yellow card) 88' | Report | Tarkowski (yellow card) 11'; Beto (yellow card) 29' | Stadium: Anfield; Attendance: 60,331; Referee: Sam Barrott |
Note: Fixture was initially scheduled for a 19:45 kick-off, but was moved for live Sky Sports broadcasting.

| 5 April 2025 31 | Everton | 1–1 | Arsenal | Liverpool |
| 12:30 BST | O'Brien (yellow card) 18'; Ndiaye 49' (pen.); Tarkowski (yellow card) 63'; Alcaraz (yellow card) 88' | Report | Trossard 34'; Jorginho (yellow card) 48' | Stadium: Goodison Park; Attendance: 39,316; Referee: Darren England |
Note: Fixture was initially scheduled for a 15:00 kick-off, but was moved for live TNT Sports broadcasting.

| 12 April 2025 32 | Nottingham Forest | 0–1 | Everton | West Bridgford |
| 15:00 BST | | Report | Doucouré (yellow card) 16', (goal) 90+4'; Branthwaite (yellow card) 39'; Gueye (yellow card) 87' | Stadium: City Ground; Attendance: 30,199; Referee: Craig Pawson |

| 19 April 2025 33 | Everton | 0–2 | Manchester City | Liverpool |
| 15:00 BST | Keane (yellow card) 55'; Gueye (yellow card) 62'; Iroegbunam (yellow card) 86'; Pickford (yellow card) 90+1' | Report | O'Reilly 84'; Kovačić 90+2' | Stadium: Goodison Park; Attendance: 39,332; Referee: Simon Hooper |

| 26 April 2025 34 | Chelsea | 1–0 | Everton | Fulham |
| 12:30 BST | Jackson 27' | Report | | Stadium: Stamford Bridge; Attendance: 39,894; Referee: Chris Kavanagh |
Note: Fixture was initially scheduled for a 15:00 kick-off, but was moved for live TNT Sports broadcasting.

| 3 May 2025 35 | Everton | 2–2 | Ipswich Town | Liverpool |
| 15:00 BST | Beto 26'; O'Brien (yellow card) 28'; McNeil 35'; Alcaraz (yellow card) 65'; Mykolenko (yellow card) 79'; Patterson (yellow card) 80' | Report | Delap (yellow card) 28'; Morsy (yellow card) 33'; Enciso 41'; Chaplin (yellow card) 65'; Hirst 79', (yellow card) 81' | Stadium: Goodison Park; Attendance: 39,305; Referee: Lewis Smith |

| 10 May 2025 36 | Fulham | 1–3 | Everton | Fulham |
| 15:00 BST | Jiménez 17'; Berge (yellow card) 56' | Report | Mykolenko 45+3'; Keane 70'; Beto 73' | Stadium: Craven Cottage; Attendance: 27,653; Referee: Darren England |

| 18 May 2025 37 | Everton | 2–0 | Southampton | Liverpool |
| 12:00 BST | Ndiaye 6', 45+2'; Garner (yellow card) 88' | Report | Downes (yellow card) 80' | Stadium: Goodison Park; Attendance: 39,201; Referee: Michael Oliver |
Note: Last Match at Goodison Park. Fixture was initially scheduled for a 15:00 kick-off, but was moved for live TNT Sports broadcasting.

| 25 May 2025 38 | Newcastle United | 0–1 | Everton | Newcastle upon Tyne |
| 16:00 BST | Schär (yellow card) 38' | Report | Gueye (yellow card) 24'; Alcaraz 65'; Young (yellow card) 77'; Mykolenko (yellow card) 81'; Garner (yellow card) 83' | Stadium: St James' Park; Attendance: 52,221; Referee: Tony Harrington |

=== FA Cup ===
Everton joined the FA Cup in the third round, and were drawn at home to Peterborough United.

Win Draw Loss Fixtures

| 9 January 2025 Third round | Everton | 2–0 | Peterborough United | Liverpool |
| 19:45 GMT | Beto 42', (yellow card) 65'; Ndiaye 90+8' (pen.) | Report | | Stadium: Goodison Park; Attendance: 38,895; Referee: Thomas Bramall |

| 8 February 2025 Fourth round | Everton | 0–2 | Bournemouth | Liverpool |
| 15:00 | Ndiaye (yellow card) 87' | Report | Semenyo 23' (pen.); Jebbison 43'; Adams (yellow card) 63'; Kerkez (yellow card) 79'; Huijsen (yellow card) 90+1'; Brooks (yellow card) 90+3' | Stadium: Goodison Park; Attendance: 38,909; Referee: John Brooks |

=== EFL Cup ===
As a Premier League club not involved in any European competitions, Everton entered the EFL Cup in the second round, and were drawn at home to EFL League Two side Doncaster Rovers. In the third round, they were drawn at home to fellow Premier League side Southampton.

Win Draw Loss Fixtures

| 27 August 2024 Second round | Everton | 3–0 | Doncaster Rovers | Liverpool |
| 19:45 BST | Iroegbunam 53', (yellow card) 58'; Young (yellow card) 69'; Ndiaye 74'; Beto 83' | Report | Senior (yellow card) 38' | Stadium: Goodison Park; Attendance: 37,245; Referee: James Bell |

| 17 September 2024 Third round | Everton | 1–1 (5–6 p) | Southampton | Liverpool |
| 19:45 BST | Doucouré 20'; Dixon (yellow card) 31'; Harrison (yellow card) 74'; Lindstrøm (yellow card) 86' | Report | Armstrong (yellow card) 27'; Harwood-Bellis 32' | Stadium: Goodison Park; Attendance: 33,842; Referee: Darren Bond |
| | Penalties |
| | Keane (penalty scored); McNeil (penalty scored); Ndiaye (penalty scored); Lindstrøm (penalty scored); Harrison (penalty scored); Young (penalty missed) | | (penalty scored) Fernandes; (penalty scored) Stewart; (penalty scored) Brereton Díaz; (penalty scored) Harwood-Bellis; (penalty scored) Aribo; (penalty scored) Bree |

== Statistics ==
=== Appearances and goals ===
As of match played 25 May 2025

Players with no appearances are not included on the list, italics indicate a loaned in player

| No. | Pos | Nat | Player | Total | | Premier League | | FA Cup | | EFL Cup | |
| No. | Pos | Nat | Player | Apps | Goals | Apps | Goals | Apps | Goals | Apps | Goals |
|---|---|---|---|---|---|---|---|---|---|---|---|
| 1 | GK | (England) ENG | Jordan Pickford | 40 | 0 | 38 | 0 | 1 | 0 | 1 | 0 |
| 2 | DF | (Scotland) SCO | Nathan Patterson | 11 | 0 | 3+7 | 0 | 1 | 0 | 0 | 0 |
| 4 | DF | (Jamaica) JAM | Mason Holgate | 1 | 0 | 0+1 | 0 | 0 | 0 | 0 | 0 |
| 5 | DF | (England) ENG | Michael Keane | 18 | 3 | 11+3 | 3 | 1+1 | 0 | 2 | 0 |
| 6 | DF | (England) ENG | James Tarkowski | 34 | 1 | 33 | 1 | 1 | 0 | 0 | 0 |
| 7 | FW | (England) ENG | Dwight McNeil | 23 | 5 | 15+6 | 4 | 0 | 0 | 2 | 1 |
| 8 | MF | (Belgium) BEL | Orel Mangala | 21 | 1 | 14+5 | 1 | 1 | 0 | 1 | 0 |
| 9 | FW | (England) ENG | Dominic Calvert-Lewin | 22 | 3 | 15+7 | 3 | 0 | 0 | 0 | 0 |
| 10 | MF | (Senegal) SEN | Iliman Ndiaye | 37 | 11 | 29+4 | 9 | 2 | 1 | 2 | 1 |
| 11 | FW | (England) ENG | Jack Harrison | 38 | 1 | 24+10 | 1 | 0+2 | 0 | 0+2 | 0 |
| 12 | GK | (Portugal) POR | João Virgínia | 2 | 0 | 0 | 0 | 1 | 0 | 1 | 0 |
| 14 | FW | (Guinea-Bissau) GBS | Beto | 34 | 10 | 15+15 | 8 | 2 | 1 | 2 | 1 |
| 15 | DF | (Republic of Ireland) IRL | Jake O'Brien | 24 | 2 | 17+3 | 2 | 2 | 0 | 2 | 0 |
| 16 | MF | (Mali) MLI | Abdoulaye Doucouré | 36 | 4 | 31+2 | 3 | 1+1 | 0 | 1 | 1 |
| 17 | FW | (Portugal) POR | Youssef Chermiti | 4 | 0 | 0+4 | 0 | 0 | 0 | 0 | 0 |
| 18 | DF | (England) ENG | Ashley Young | 36 | 1 | 19+13 | 1 | 1+1 | 0 | 0+2 | 0 |
| 19 | DF | (Ukraine) UKR | Vitaliy Mykolenko | 37 | 1 | 35 | 1 | 1 | 0 | 1 | 0 |
| 22 | FW | (Albania) ALB | Armando Broja | 11 | 0 | 4+6 | 0 | 0+1 | 0 | 0 | 0 |
| 23 | DF | (Republic of Ireland) IRL | Séamus Coleman | 6 | 0 | 3+2 | 0 | 0 | 0 | 1 | 0 |
| 24 | MF | (Argentina) ARG | Carlos Alcaraz | 16 | 2 | 7+8 | 2 | 0+1 | 0 | 0 | 0 |
| 27 | MF | (Senegal) SEN | Idrissa Gueye | 40 | 0 | 35+2 | 0 | 2 | 0 | 0+1 | 0 |
| 29 | FW | (Denmark) DEN | Jesper Lindstrøm | 29 | 0 | 15+10 | 0 | 1+1 | 0 | 2 | 0 |
| 32 | DF | (England) ENG | Jarrad Branthwaite | 32 | 0 | 28+2 | 0 | 2 | 0 | 0 | 0 |
| 37 | MF | (England) ENG | James Garner | 23 | 0 | 17+4 | 0 | 1 | 0 | 1 | 0 |
| 42 | MF | (England) ENG | Tim Iroegbunam | 21 | 0 | 5+13 | 0 | 0+1 | 0 | 1+1 | 0 |
| 75 | DF | (England) ENG | Roman Dixon | 3 | 0 | 1 | 0 | 0 | 0 | 1+1 | 0 |
Player who featured but departed the club on loan during the season:
| 45 | MF | (England) ENG | Harrison Armstrong | 6 | 0 | 0+3 | 0 | 1 | 0 | 1+1 | 0 |
