= Jarrad Branthwaite =

English footballer (born 2002)

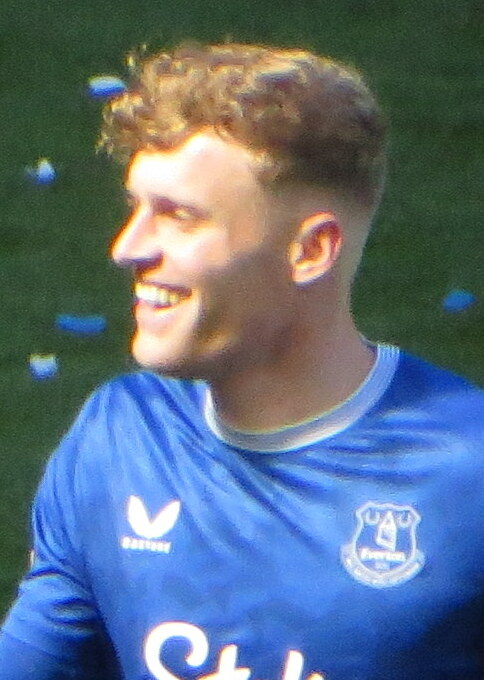
- Branthwaite with Everton in 2025

Personal information
- Full name: Jarrad Paul Branthwaite
- Date of birth: 27 June 2002 (age 24)
- Place of birth: Carlisle, Cumbria, England
- Height: 6 ft 5 in (1.95 m)
- Position: Centre-back

Team information
- Current team: Everton
- Number: 4

Youth career
- 2009–2019: Carlisle United

Senior career*
Years	Team	Apps	(Gls)
2019–2020	Carlisle United	9	(0)
2020–	Everton	94	(5)
2021–2022	→ Blackburn Rovers (loan)	10	(0)
2022–2023	→ PSV Eindhoven (loan)	27	(2)

International career^{‡}
2021–2022	England U20	2	(0)
2023–2025	England U21	8	(0)
2024–	England	3	(0)
Medal record
Representing England
UEFA European Under-21 Championship
Winner	2023 Georgia–Romania
- * Club domestic league appearances and goals as of 6 November 2026 ‡ National team caps and goals as of 22:40, 6 October 2026 (UTC)

Jarrad Paul Branthwaite (born 27 June 2002) is an English professional footballer who plays as a centre-back for Premier League club Everton and the England national team.

== Early life ==
Jarrad Paul Branthwaite was born on 27 June 2002 in Carlisle, Cumbria.

== Club career ==
=== Carlisle United ===
Branthwaite started his career with Carlisle United's youth system aged eight and signed his first professional contract, of two years with an option to extend, in February 2019. His first involvement with the first team came as an unused substitute on 16 March in a 1–1 draw away to Forest Green Rovers. He appeared on the bench for seven more consecutive League Two matches that season.

Branthwaite started the 2019–20 season with 13 consecutive bench appearances in League Two matches, as well as making the bench in Carlisle United's 3–0 win over Barnsley and 2–1 loss to Rochdale in the first and second rounds of the 2019–20 EFL Cup. On 19 October 2019, Branthwaite made his debut and started in a 2–0 League Two loss away to Plymouth Argyle, playing the full match and receiving a yellow card in the 40th minute. He scored his first goal for Carlisle in an EFL Trophy tie against Morecambe on 12 November.

=== Everton ===
==== 2020–2022 ====
On 13 January 2020, Branthwaite signed a two-and-a-half-year contract with Premier League club Everton, keeping him at the club until June 2022. He made his debut for the club on 12 July, coming on as a substitute in a 3–0 defeat against Wolverhampton Wanderers. He made his home debut against Aston Villa on 16 July, coming on as a substitute for the second straight game, this time for the injured Mason Holgate in the 16th minute. Branthwaite started his first game for Everton on 20 July against Sheffield United after signing an extended contract until June 2023, in which he was named Man of the Match in a 1–0 win for Everton.

On 14 January 2021, Branthwaite joined Championship club Blackburn Rovers on loan for the rest of the 2020–21 season. He made his debut two days later, starting and playing the full ninety minutes in a league game against Stoke City that finished 1–1. Branthwaite's season was ended prematurely on 21 April when he suffered an ankle injury during training. In total, he played in ten league games, all starts, for Rovers, including nine straight after joining on loan.

On 16 December 2021, Branthwaite made his first Premier League start of the season and scored his first Everton goal in a 1–1 away draw against Chelsea.

==== 2022–present ====
On 17 July 2022, Branthwaite joined Eredivisie club PSV Eindhoven on a season-long loan. He scored an own goal in the 2023 KNVB Cup final against Ajax. PSV eventually lifted the trophy after winning a penalty shoot-out.

After beginning the 2023–24 season on the bench, Branthwaite started in Everton's third Premier League fixture, a 1–0 loss to Wolverhampton Wanderers on 26 August 2023. After his appearance against Wolves, he continued to start in central defence, forming a partnership with James Tarkowski. On 6 October, he signed a new contract with Everton running until June 2027. Branthwaite scored his first goal of the 2023–24 season on 3 February 2024, with an 94th minute equaliser against Tottenham Hotspur in a 2–2 home draw. At the end of that season, he was voted as Everton's Players' Player and Supporters' Young Player of the Season.

On 2 July 2025, Branthwaite signed a new long-term contract with the club until 2030.

== International career ==
In November 2020, Branthwaite earned his first youth international call-up, being selected for the England national under-19 team.

In August 2021, Branthwaite received a call-up for the England under-20 team. On 6 September, he made his debut in a 6–1 victory over Romania at St George's Park.

On 17 March 2023, Branthwaite received his first call up to the England under-21 team. On 14 June, he was included in the England squad for the 2023 UEFA European Under-21 Championship; a tournament England went on to win.

On 14 March 2024, Branthwaite received his first call up to the England senior team. On 3 June, he made his senior team debut as a substitute during a 3–0 victory against Bosnia and Herzegovina. He was selected for England's provisional 33-man squad for UEFA Euro 2024, but was ultimately left out of the final 26-man squad for the tournament.

== Career statistics ==
=== Club ===
As of match played 17 October 2026

Appearances and goals by club, season and competition
Club	Season	League			National cup (Note: Includes FA Cup, KNVB Cup)		League cup (Note: Includes EFL Cup)		Europe		Other		Total	
Club	Season	Division	Apps	Goals	Apps	Goals	Apps	Goals	Apps	Goals	Apps	Goals	Apps	Goals
Carlisle United	2018–19	League Two	0	0	0	0	0	0	—		0	0	0	0
Carlisle United	2019–20	League Two	9	0	2	0	0	0	—		3 (Note: Appearances in EFL Trophy)	1	14	1
Carlisle United	Total		9	0	2	0	0	0	—		3	1	14	1
Everton	2019–20	Premier League	4	0	—		—		—		—		4	0
Everton	2020–21	Premier League	0	0	0	0	1	0	—		—		1	0
Everton	2021–22	Premier League	6	1	1	0	1	0	—		—		8	1
Everton	2023–24	Premier League	35	3	3	0	3	0	—		—		41	3
Everton	2024–25	Premier League	30	0	2	0	0	0	—		—		32	0
Everton	2025–26	Premier League	10	1	0	0	0	0	—		—		10	1
Everton	2026–27	Premier League	7	0	0	0	0	0	—		—		6	0
Everton	Total		92	5	6	0	5	0	—		—		102	5
Blackburn Rovers (loan)	2020–21	Championship	10	0	—		—		—		—		10	0
PSV Eindhoven (loan)	2022–23	Eredivisie	27	2	4	2	—		5 (Note: Two appearances in UEFA Champions League, three appearances in UEFA Europa League)	0	0	0	36	4
Jong PSV (loan)	2022–23	Eerste Divisie	1	0	—		—		—		—		1	0
Career total			139	7	12	2	5	0	5	0	3	1	163	10

=== International ===
As of match played 6 October 2026

Appearances and goals by national team and year
Year	National team	Apps	Goals
2024	England	1	0
2025	England	0	0
2026	England	2	0
	Total	3	0

== Honours ==
PSV Eindhoven

- KNVB Cup: 2022–23

England U21

- UEFA European Under-21 Championship: 2023

Individual

- Everton Young Player of the Season: 2023–24
- Everton Players' Player of the Season: 2023–24
