= Francis Gomez =

Francis Gomez may refer to:

- Francis Gómez (judoka) (born 1968), Venezuelan judoka
- Francis Gomez (footballer) (born 2006), Gambian footballer
