= 2023–24 Everton F.C. season =

English football club season

Everton
2023–24 season
- Owner: Farhad Moshiri
- Manager: Sean Dyche
- Stadium: Goodison Park
- Premier League: 15th
- FA Cup: Fourth Round
- EFL Cup: Quarter-Final
- Top goalscorer: League: Dominic Calvert-Lewin; Abdoulaye Doucouré (7); All: Dominic Calvert-Lewin (8)
- Highest home attendance: 39,940 vs Fulham (12 August 2023, Premier League)
- Lowest home attendance: 37,713 vs Luton Town (27 January 2024, FA Cup)
Home colours	Away colours	Third colours

The 2023–24 season was the 146th season in the history of Everton Football Club and their 70th consecutive season in the top flight of English football. In addition to the domestic league, the club participated in the FA Cup and the EFL Cup.

On 17 November 2023, Everton were deducted ten points from their Premier League total for breaching the league's profit and sustainability rules. This marked the biggest points deduction in Premier League history. Everton appealed against the decision, with their appeal intended to be heard in March 2024. However, on 15 January 2024, they were found to have another breach of the profit and sustainability rules with an ongoing investigation. On 26 February, the aforementioned ten point deduction was reduced to six points after the initial result of the appeal board.

On 8 April, Everton were further found guilty for a second profit and sustainability rule breach, resulting in a two-point deduction, subject to appeal. As a result, Everton became the first club in English top-flight history to have ever received two separate points deductions in a single season.

== Squad ==
As of 4 June 2024

No.	Player	Position	Nationality	Date of birth (age)	Signed from	Fee	Contract end
Goalkeepers
1	Jordan Pickford	GK	(England)	7 March 1994 (age 32)	Sunderland	£25,000,000	30 June 2027
12	João Virgínia	GK	(Portugal)	10 October 1999 (age 27)	Arsenal	Free	30 June 2025
31	Andy Lonergan	GK	(England)	19 October 1983 (age 43)	West Bromwich Albion	Free	30 June 2024
43	Billy Crellin	GK	(England)	30 June 2000 (age 26)	Fleetwood Town	Undisclosed	30 June 2025
Defenders
2	Nathan Patterson	DF	(Scotland)	16 October 2001 (age 25)	Rangers	£11,000,000	30 June 2027
5	Michael Keane	DF	(England)	11 January 1993 (age 33)	Burnley	£25,000,000	30 June 2025
6	James Tarkowski	DF	(England)	19 November 1992 (age 33)	Burnley	Free	30 June 2026
18	Ashley Young	DF	(England)	9 July 1985 (age 41)	Aston Villa	Free	30 June 2025
19	Vitalii Mykolenko	DF	(Ukraine)	29 May 1999 (age 27)	Dynamo Kyiv	£18,000,000	30 June 2026
22	Ben Godfrey	DF	(England)	15 January 1998 (age 28)	Norwich City	£20,000,000	30 June 2025
23	Seamus Coleman	DF	(Republic of Ireland)	11 October 1988 (age 38)	Sligo Rovers	£60,000	30 June 2025
32	Jarrad Branthwaite	DF	(England)	27 June 2002 (age 24)	Carlisle United	£750,000	30 June 2027
58	Mackenzie Hunt	DF	(England)	14 November 2001 (age 24)	Academy	Trainee	30 June 2024
Midfielders
8	Amadou Onana	MF	(Belgium)	16 August 2001 (age 25)	Lille	£30,000,000	30 June 2027
16	Abdoulaye Doucouré	MF	(Mali)	1 January 1993 (age 33)	Watford	£20,000,000	30 June 2025
20	Dele Alli	MF	(England)	11 April 1996 (age 30)	Tottenham Hotspur	Free	30 June 2024
21	André Gomes	MF	(Portugal)	30 July 1993 (age 33)	Barcelona	£22,000,000	30 June 2024
27	Idrissa Gueye	MF	(Senegal)	26 September 1989 (age 37)	Paris Saint-Germain	£2,000,000	30 June 2025
37	James Garner	MF	(England)	13 March 2001 (age 25)	Manchester United	£9,000,000	30 June 2026
62	Tyler Onyango	MF	(England)	4 March 2003 (age 23)	Academy	Trainee	30 June 2025
Forwards
7	Dwight McNeil	FW	(England)	22 November 1999 (age 26)	Burnley	£15,000,000	30 June 2027
9	Dominic Calvert-Lewin	FW	(England)	16 March 1997 (age 29)	Sheffield United	£1,500,000	30 June 2025
10	Arnaut Danjuma	FW	(Netherlands)	31 January 1997 (age 29)	Villarreal	Loan	31 May 2024
11	Jack Harrison	FW	(England)	20 November 1996 (age 29)	Leeds United	Loan	31 May 2024
14	Beto	FW	(Guinea-Bissau)	31 January 1998 (age 28)	Udinese	£21,500,000	30 June 2027
28	Youssef Chermiti	FW	(Portugal)	24 May 2004 (age 22)	Sporting CP	£10,750,000	30 June 2027
61	Lewis Dobbin	FW	(England)	3 January 2003 (age 23)	Academy	Trainee	30 June 2025
Out on loan
4	Mason Holgate	DF	(England)	22 October 1996 (age 30)	Barnsley	£2,000,000	30 June 2025
13	Neal Maupay	FW	(France)	14 August 1996 (age 30)	Brighton & Hove Albion	£12,000,000	30 June 2025

== Transfers ==
=== In ===
Date	Pos.	Player	Transferred from	Fee	Ref.
13 July 2023	DF	(England) Ashley Young	(England) Aston Villa	Free transfer	
11 August 2023	FW	(Portugal) Youssef Chermiti	(Portugal) Sporting CP	£10,750,000	
29 August 2023	FW	(Guinea-Bissau) Beto	(Italy) Udinese	£21,500,000	
5 September 2023	GK	(England) Fraser Barnsley	(England) Oxford United	Undisclosed	
31 January 2024	FW	(Ghana) Kingsford Boakye	Free agent	—N/a	
Total				£32,250,000	

=== Out ===
Date	Pos.	Player	Transferred to	Fee	Ref.
30 June 2023	GK	(Bosnia and Herzegovina) Asmir Begović	(England) Queens Park Rangers	Released	
30 June 2023	MF	(England) Shae Cahill	(Australia) Brisbane Roar	Released	
30 June 2023	MF	(England) Tom Davies	(England) Sheffield United	Released	
30 June 2023	DF	(England) Lewis Gibson	(England) Plymouth Argyle	Free transfer	
30 June 2023	MF	(Norway) Einar Iversen	Free agent	Released	
30 June 2023	DF	(Colombia) Yerry Mina	(Italy) Fiorentina	Released	
30 June 2023	MF	(Northern Ireland) Isaac Price	(Belgium) Standard Liège	£400,000	
30 June 2023	FW	(England) Troy Smikle-James	Free agent	Released	
30 June 2023	FW	(England) Andros Townsend	(England) Luton Town	Released	
30 June 2023	DF	(England) Charlie Wilson	(England) Norwich City	Released	
30 June 2023	DF	(England) Harry Wright	(England) Fleetwood Town	Released	
1 July 2023	DF	(France) Niels Nkounkou	(France) Saint-Étienne	£1,700,000	
1 July 2023	FW	(Italy) Moise Kean	(Italy) Juventus	£31,200,000	
7 July 2023	FW	(England) Ellis Simms	(England) Coventry City	£8,000,000	
8 July 2023	DF	(England) Ishé Samuels-Smith	(England) Chelsea	£4,000,000	
1 September 2023	FW	(Republic of Ireland) Thomas Cannon	(England) Leicester City	£7,500,000	
1 September 2023	MF	(Ivory Coast) Jean-Philippe Gbamin	(France) USL Dunkerque	Released	
2 September 2023	MF	(Nigeria) Alex Iwobi	(England) Fulham	£22,000,000	
7 September 2023	FW	(Jamaica) Demarai Gray	(Saudi Arabia) Al-Ettifaq	£8,000,000	
18 January 2024	DF	(Wales) Ryan Astley	(Scotland) Dundee	Undisclosed	
Total				£82,800,000	

=== Loaned in ===
Date	Pos.	Player	Loaned from	Until	Ref.
23 July 2023	FW	(Netherlands) Arnaut Danjuma	(Spain) Villarreal	End of Season	
14 August 2023	FW	(England) Jack Harrison	(England) Leeds United	End of Season	

=== Loaned out ===
Date	Pos.	Player	Loaned to	Until	Ref.
1 July 2023	GK	(England) Harry Tyrer	(England) Chesterfield	End of Season	
26 July 2023	MF	(England) Lewis Warrington	(England) Plymouth Argyle	14 January 2024 (Note: On 14 January, Warrington returned from his season-long loan at Plymouth early due to injury.)	
27 July 2023	MF	(England) Stanley Mills	(England) Oxford United	8 January 2024 (Note: On 8 January, Mills returned from his season-long loan at Oxford early due to injury.)	
4 August 2023	GK	(Slovenia) Žan-Luk Leban	(England) Farsley Celtic	End of Season	
10 August 2023	DF	(England) Reece Welch	(England) Forest Green Rovers	3 January 2024 (Note: On 3 January, Welch was recalled from his season-long loan at Forest Green.)	
25 August 2023	DF	(England) Mason Holgate	(England) Southampton	1 February 2024 (Note: On 1 February, Holgate was recalled from his loan at Southampton and subsequently joined Sheffield United on loan.)	
1 September 2023	FW	(France) Neal Maupay	(England) Brentford	End of Season	
1 February 2024	DF	(England) Elijah Campbell	(England) Fleetwood Town	End of Season	
1 February 2024	DF	(England) Mason Holgate	(England) Sheffield United	End of Season	
1 February 2024	MF	(England) Sean McAllister	(Scotland) Inverness Caledonian Thistle	End of Season	
9 February 2024	GK	(England) Jack Barrett	(Canada) Cavalry	End of Season	

== Kits ==
Home	Home Alt.	Home Alt. 2	Away	Third

== Pre-season and friendlies ==
On 8 June, Everton announced their first two pre-season friendlies, against Bolton Wanderers and Stoke City. Five days later, a third friendly was confirmed, against Stade Nyonnais. A fourth and fifth friendly was later confirmed, against Sporting CP and Wigan Athletic. They played a friendly against Monza on 1 August.

Win Draw Loss Fixtures

14 July 2023 Friendly	Stade Nyonnais	1–2	Everton	Nyon, Switzerland
18:00 CEST; 17:00 BST	Dugourd 82'	Report	Kouyate 61'; Maupay 70' (pen.)	Stadium: Centre Sportif De Colovray

22 July 2023 Friendly	Wigan Athletic	0–1	Everton	Wigan
14:00 BST	Hughes (yellow card) 9'	Report	Young 64'	Stadium: DW Stadium; Attendance: 9,897

25 July 2023 Friendly	Bolton Wanderers	0–0	Everton	Horwich
19:45 BST		Report		Stadium: University of Bolton Stadium

29 July 2023 Friendly	Stoke City	0–1	Everton	Stoke
15:00 BST		Report	Onana 90+6'	Stadium: Bet365 Stadium

1 August 2023 Friendly	Everton	2–2	Monza	Walton
	Dobbin 70'; Maupay 76'	Report	Colpani 52'; Mota 78'	Stadium: Goodison Park

5 August 2023 Friendly	Everton	1–0	Sporting CP	Walton
15:00 BST	Calvert-Lewin 45+1' (pen.)	Report		Stadium: Goodison Park; Attendance: 28,322

== Competitions ==
=== Overall record ===
Competition	First match	Last match	Starting round	Final position	Record							
Competition	First match	Last match	Starting round	Final position	Pld	W	D	L	GF	GA	GD	Win %
Premier League	12 August 2023	19 May 2024	Matchday 1	15th	38	13	9	16	40	51	−11	34.21
FA Cup	4 January 2024	27 January 2024	Third round	Fourth round	3	1	1	1	2	2	+0	33.33
EFL Cup	30 August 2023	19 December 2023	Second round	Quarter-finals	4	3	1	0	8	3	+5	75.00
Total					45	17	11	17	50	56	−6	37.78

Source: Soccerway

=== Premier League ===
==== League table ====
Pos	Team	Pld	W	D	L	GF	GA	GD	Pts
13	Fulham	38	13	8	17	55	61	−6	47
14	Wolverhampton Wanderers	38	13	7	18	50	65	−15	46
15	Everton	38	13	9	16	40	51	−11	40 (Note: Everton were deducted eight points for breaching profitability and sustainability rules. They were originally deducted ten points but this was reduced to six after an appeal. The club were then deducted an additional two points for further PSR breaches.)
16	Brentford	38	10	9	19	56	65	−9	39
17	Nottingham Forest	38	9	9	20	49	67	−18	32 (Note: Nottingham Forest were deducted four points for breaching profitability and sustainability rules. The club appealed the decision but were unsuccessful.)

Source: Premier League
Rules for classification: 1) Points; 2) Goal difference; 3) Goals scored; 4) If the champions, relegated teams or qualified teams for UEFA competitions cannot be determined by rules 1 to 3, rules 4.1 to 4.3 are applied – 4.1) Points gained in head-to-head record between such teams; 4.2) Away goals scored in head-to-head record between such teams; 4.3) Play-offs

==== Results summary ====
Overall								Home						Away					
Pld	W	D	L	GF	GA	GD	Pts	W	D	L	GF	GA	GD	W	D	L	GF	GA	GD
38	13	9	16	40	51	−11	40	8	4	7	22	18	+4	5	5	9	18	33	−15

Source: Soccerway

==== Results by round ====
Round	1	2	3	4	5	6	7	8	9	10	11	12	13	14	15	16	17	18	19	20	21	22	23	24	25	26	27	28	30	31	32	33	34	29	35	36	37	38
Ground	H	A	H	A	H	A	H	H	A	A	H	A	H	A	H	H	A	A	H	A	H	A	H	A	H	A	H	A	A	A	H	A	H	H	H	A	H	A
Result	L	L	L	D	L	W	L	W	L	W	D	W	L	W	W	W	W	L	L	L	D	D	D	L	D	D	L	L	L	D	W	L	W	W	W	D	W	L
Position	15	20	20	18	18	15	16	16	16	15	16	19^{1}	19	18	17	17	16	16	17	17	17	18	18	18	17	15^{2}	16	16	16	16	16^{3}	16	16	16	15	15	15	15
Points	0	0	0	1	1	4	4	7	7	10	11	4^{1}	4	7	10	13	16	16	16	16	17	18	19	19	20	25^{2}	25	25	25	26	27^{3}	27	30	33	36	37	40	40

Source: Soccerway
A = Away; H = Home; W = Win; D = Draw; L = Loss; P = Postponed
Notes:
- ^{1} Everton were originally 14th with 14 points at the end of Matchday 12. On 17 November 2023, they were deducted 10 points, bringing them down to 19th with 4 points.
- ^{2} Following the appeals process, on 26 February 2024 the points deduction was reduced to 6 points, moving Everton to 15th place on 25 points.
- ^{3} For a second profit and sustainability rule breach, Everton had 2 points deducted on 8 April 2024, moving them down from 15th to 16th.

==== Matches ====
On 15 June, the Premier League fixtures were released.

Win Draw Loss Fixtures

12 August 2023 1	Everton	0–1	Fulham	Walton, Liverpool
15:00 BST		Report	Willian (yellow card) 30'; Decordova-Reid 73'; Tete (yellow card) 87'	Stadium: Goodison Park; Attendance: 39,940; Referee: Stuart Attwell

20 August 2023 2	Aston Villa	4–0	Everton	Aston, Birmingham
14:00 BST	Douglas Luiz (yellow card) 14', (goal) 24' (pen.); McGinn 18'; Digne (yellow card) 33'; Bailey 51'; Durán 75'; Archer (yellow card) 89'	Report	Pickford (yellow card) 24'; Keane (yellow card) 45+4'; Gueye (yellow card) 45+9'; Patterson (yellow card) 86'	Stadium: Villa Park; Attendance: 41,694; Referee: Anthony Taylor
Note: Live on Sky Sports

26 August 2023 3	Everton	0–1	Wolverhampton Wanderers	Walton, Liverpool
15:00 BST	Branthwaite (yellow card) 53'; Garner (yellow card) 63'; Chermiti (yellow card) 90'	Report	João Gomes (yellow card) 29'; Semedo (yellow card) 40'; Lemina (yellow card) 51'; Dawson (yellow card) 68'; Kalajdžić 87'	Stadium: Goodison Park; Attendance: 38,851; Referee: Craig Pawson

2 September 2023 4	Sheffield United	2–2	Everton	Sheffield
12:30 BST	Archer 33'; Pickford 45+3' (o.g.); Ahmedhodžić (yellow card) 49'	Report	Branthwaite (yellow card) 9'; Doucouré 14', (yellow card) 73'; Danjuma 55'	Stadium: Bramall Lane; Attendance: 31,124; Referee: Andrew Madley

17 September 2023 5	Everton	0–1	Arsenal	Walton, Liverpool
16:30 BST	Young (yellow card) 45+2'	Report	Gabriel (yellow card) 48'; Trossard 69'	Stadium: Goodison Park; Attendance: 39,217; Referee: Simon Hooper
Note: The match was rescheduled from 17:30 BST on 16 September, following the scheduling of the UEFA Champions League group stage fixtures.

23 September 2023 6	Brentford	1–3	Everton	Brentford
17:30 BST	Jensen 28'; Mbeumo (yellow card) 77'; Ghoddos (yellow card) 82'	Report	Young (yellow card) 1'; Doucouré 6'; Tarkowski 67'; Calvert-Lewin 71'; Branthwaite (yellow card) 90+1'	Stadium: Gtech Community Stadium; Attendance: 16,981; Referee: Michael Oliver

30 September 2023 7	Everton	1–2	Luton Town	Walton, Liverpool
15:00 BST	Calvert-Lewin 41'	Report	Lockyer 24'; Morris 31'; Kaboré (yellow card) 66'	Stadium: Goodison Park; Attendance: 39,289; Referee: Anthony Taylor

7 October 2023 8	Everton	3–0	Bournemouth	Walton, Liverpool
15:00 BST	Garner 8'; Young (yellow card) 11'; Harrison 37'; Doucouré 60'	Report	Solanke (yellow card) 58'; Neto (yellow card) 60'	Stadium: Goodison Park; Attendance: 38,815; Referee: David Coote

21 October 2023 9	Liverpool	2–0	Everton	Anfield, Liverpool
12:30 BST	Konaté (yellow card) 50'; Salah 75' (pen.), 90+7'	Report	Young (yellow card) 18' (yellow-red card) 37'; Tarkowski (yellow card) 32'	Stadium: Anfield; Attendance: 50,201; Referee: Craig Pawson

29 October 2023 10	West Ham United	0–1	Everton	Stratford
13:00 GMT	Kudus (yellow card) 28'; Paquetá (yellow card) 69'; Benrahma (yellow card) 77'; Álvarez (yellow card) 83'	Report	Pickford (yellow card) 28'; Calvert-Lewin 51'	Stadium: London Stadium; Attendance: 62,469; Referee: Stuart Attwell

4 November 2023 11	Everton	1–1	Brighton & Hove Albion	Walton, Liverpool
15:00 GMT	Mykolenko 7'; Gueye (yellow card) 43'; Doucouré (yellow card) 54'; Branthwaite (yellow card) 77'; Tarkowski (yellow card) 81'	Report	Gilmour (yellow card) 20'; Dunk (yellow card) 23'; Young 84' (o.g.)	Stadium: Goodison Park; Attendance: 38,683; Referee: Tim Robinson

11 November 2023 12	Crystal Palace	2–3	Everton	Selhurst
15:00 GMT	Eze 5' (pen.), (yellow card) 24'; Édouard 73'	Report	Mykolenko 1', (yellow card) 90+7'; Doucouré (yellow card) 45+2', (goal) 49'; Gueye 86'; Onana (yellow card) 88'; Garner (yellow card) 89'	Stadium: Selhurst Park; Attendance: 25,103; Referee: Sam Barrott

26 November 2023 13	Everton	0–3	Manchester United	Walton, Liverpool
16:30 GMT	Young (yellow card) 21'; Doucouré (yellow card) 29'; Gueye (yellow card) 90+2'	Report	Garnacho 3'; Rashford 56' (pen.); Martial 75'	Stadium: Goodison Park; Attendance: 39,257; Referee: John Brooks

2 December 2023 14	Nottingham Forest	0–1	Everton	West Bridgford
17:30 GMT	Felipe (yellow card) 55'	Report	McNeil 67'	Stadium: City Ground; Attendance: 29,404; Referee: Paul Tierney

7 December 2023 15	Everton	3–0	Newcastle United	Walton, Liverpool
19:30 GMT	Gueye (yellow card) 35'; McNeil 79'; Calvert-Lewin (yellow card) 83'; Doucouré 86'; Beto (yellow card) 87', (goal) 90+6'	Report		Stadium: Goodison Park; Attendance: 38,198; Referee: Tim Robinson
Note: Live on Amazon Prime Video

10 December 2023 16	Everton	2–0	Chelsea	Walton, Liverpool
14:00 GMT	Gueye (yellow card) 15'; Doucouré 54'; Branthwaite (yellow card) 59'; Dobbin 90+2'	Report	Palmer (yellow card) 20'; Mudryk (yellow card) 73'	Stadium: Goodison Park; Attendance: 39,280; Referee: Michael Oliver

16 December 2023 17	Burnley	0–2	Everton	Burnley
17:30 GMT		Report	Onana 19'; Keane 25'; Garner (yellow card) 82'	Stadium: Turf Moor; Attendance: 21,413; Referee: Anthony Taylor
Note: Live on Sky Sports

23 December 2023 18	Tottenham Hotspur	2–1	Everton	Tottenham
15:00 GMT	Richarlison 9'; Son 18'; Kulusevski (yellow card) 86'	Report	Gueye (yellow card) 23'; Onana (yellow card) 26'; Gomes (yellow card) 75', (goal) 82'; Patterson (yellow card) 83'	Stadium: Tottenham Hotspur Stadium; Attendance: 62,850; Referee: Stuart Attwell

27 December 2023 19	Everton	1–3	Manchester City	Walton, Liverpool
20:15 GMT	Harrison 29'; Patterson (yellow card) 39'; Gomes (yellow card) 60'; Pickford (yellow card) 63'; Branthwaite (yellow card) 78'	Report	Foden 53'; Akanji (yellow card) 59'; Álvarez 64' (pen.); Grealish (yellow card) 81'; Silva 86'	Stadium: Goodison Park; Attendance: 39,327; Referee: John Brooks

30 December 2023 20	Wolverhampton Wanderers	3–0	Everton	Wolverhampton
15:00 GMT	Kilman 25'; Aït-Nouri (yellow card) 43'; Doyle (yellow card) 45+5'; Cunha 53'; Dawson 61'	Report	Patterson (yellow card) 23'; McNeil (yellow card) 45+5'; Tarkowski (yellow card) 67'	Stadium: Molineux; Attendance: 31,639; Referee: Thomas Bramall

14 January 2024 21	Everton	0–0	Aston Villa	Walton, Liverpool
14:00 GMT	Tarkowski (yellow card) 73'	Report	Watkins (yellow card) 31'; Diego Carlos (yellow card) 48'; Lenglet (yellow card) 73'; Tielemans (yellow card) 75'	Stadium: Goodison Park; Attendance: 39,284; Referee: David Coote
Note: Live on Sky Sports

30 January 2024 22	Fulham	0–0	Everton	Fulham
19:45 GMT	Palhinha (yellow card) 26'	Report	Godfrey (yellow card) 28'; Branthwaite (yellow card) 42'	Stadium: Craven Cottage; Attendance: 24,376; Referee: Thomas Bramall

3 February 2024 23	Everton	2–2	Tottenham Hotspur	Walton, Liverpool
12:30 GMT	Harrison 30'; Godfrey (yellow card) 60'; Garner (yellow card) 90+1'; Branthwaite 90+4'; Dobbin (yellow card) 90+8'	Report	Richarlison 4', 41'	Stadium: Goodison Park; Attendance: 39,321; Referee: Michael Oliver

10 February 2024 24	Manchester City	2–0	Everton	Manchester
12:30 GMT	Haaland 71', 85'	Report	Gueye (yellow card) 54'; Garner (yellow card) 90+7'	Stadium: City of Manchester Stadium; Attendance: 53,469; Referee: John Brooks

19 February 2024 25	Everton	1–1	Crystal Palace	Walton, Liverpool
20:00 GMT	Onana 84'	Report	Ayew 66', (yellow card) 87'; Lerma (yellow card) 90+4'	Stadium: Goodison Park; Attendance: 38,164; Referee: Paul Tierney

24 February 2024 26	Brighton & Hove Albion	1–1	Everton	Falmer
15:00 GMT	Van Hecke (yellow card) 70'; Groß (yellow card) 74'; Gilmour (red card) 81'; Dunk 90+5'	Report	Tarkowski (yellow card) 33'; Branthwaite 73'; Beto (yellow card) 90+1'; Onana (yellow card) 90+2'	Stadium: Falmer Stadium; Attendance: 41,646; Referee: Tony Harrington

2 March 2024 27	Everton	1–3	West Ham United	Walton, Liverpool
15:00 GMT	Beto (penalty missed) 45', 56'; Pickford (yellow card) 90+2'	Report	Zouma 62'; Souček 90+1', (yellow card) 90+2'; Antonio (yellow card) 90+3'; Álvarez 90+5'	Stadium: Goodison Park; Attendance: 39,262; Referee: Craig Pawson

9 March 2024 28	Manchester United	2–0	Everton	Manchester
12:30 GMT	Fernandes 12' (pen.); Rashford 36' (pen.); McTominay (yellow card) 69'	Report	Onana (yellow card) 26'; Doucouré (yellow card) 34'	Stadium: Old Trafford; Attendance: 73,601; Referee: Simon Hooper
Note: Fixture was originally scheduled for a 15:00 kick-off, but was brought forward for live TNT Sports coverage.

30 March 2024 30	Bournemouth	2–1	Everton	Kings Park
15:00 GMT	Solanke (yellow card) 30', (goal) 64'; Coleman 90+1' (o.g.)	Report	Onana (yellow card) 42'; Tarkowski (yellow card) 76'; Beto 87'	Stadium: Dean Court; Attendance: 11,207; Referee: Sam Barrott

2 April 2024 31	Newcastle United	1–1	Everton	Newcastle
19:30 BST	Isak 15'	Report	Tarkowski (yellow card) 81'; Calvert-Lewin 88' (pen.); Chermiti (yellow card) 90+8'; McNeil (yellow card) 90+8'	Stadium: St James' Park; Attendance: 52,135; Referee: Tony Harrington
Note: Fixture was initially scheduled for 3 April, but was moved for live TNT Sports broadcast.

6 April 2024 32	Everton	1–0	Burnley	Walton, Liverpool
15:00 BST	Tarkowski (yellow card) 34'; Gomes (yellow card) 45'; Calvert-Lewin 45+2'	Report	O'Shea (red card) 67'; Berge (yellow card) 90'	Stadium: Goodison Park; Attendance: 39,125; Referee: Michael Oliver

15 April 2024 33	Chelsea	6–0	Everton	Fulham
20:00 BST	Palmer 13', 18', 29', 64' (pen.); Mudryk (yellow card) 40'; Jackson 44'; Gilchrist 90'	Report	Garner (yellow card) 28'; Young (yellow card) 36'; Tarkowski (yellow card) 52'; Keane (yellow card) 66'	Stadium: Stamford Bridge; Attendance: 39,392; Referee: Paul Tierney
Note: Fixture was initially scheduled for 13 April, but was moved for live Sky Sports broadcast.

21 April 2024 34	Everton	2–0	Nottingham Forest	Walton, Liverpool
13:30 BST	Gueye 29'; Doucouré (yellow card) 74'; McNeil 76'; Branthwaite (yellow card) 81'; Harrison (yellow card) 83'; Chermiti (yellow card) 90+16'	Report	Yates (yellow card) 80'; Murillo (yellow card) 90+11'	Stadium: Goodison Park; Attendance: 39,239; Referee: Anthony Taylor
Note: Fixture was initially scheduled for 20 April, but was moved for live Sky Sports broadcast.

24 April 2024 29	Everton	2–0	Liverpool	Walton, Liverpool
20:00 BST	Branthwaite 27'; Calvert-Lewin 58'	Report	Van Dijk (yellow card) 37'; Díaz (yellow card) 90+3'; Mac Allister (yellow card) 90+4'	Stadium: Goodison Park; Attendance: 38,222; Referee: Andrew Madley
Note: Fixture was originally scheduled for 16 March, but was moved for live Sky Sports coverage. Fixture was then later postponed due to Liverpool's FA Cup progression.

27 April 2024 35	Everton	1–0	Brentford	Walton, Liverpool
17:30 BST	Gueye 60'; Tarkowski (yellow card) 74'	Report	Reguilón (yellow card) 43'; Mbeumo (yellow card) 90+1'	Stadium: Goodison Park; Attendance: 39,098; Referee: Darren England
Note: Fixture was initially scheduled a 15:00 kick-off, but was moved for live Sky Sports coverage.

3 May 2024 36	Luton Town	1–1	Everton	Luton
20:00 BST	Adebayo 31'; Chong (yellow card) 43'	Report	Garner (yellow card) 9'; Calvert-Lewin 24' (pen.); Gueye (yellow card) 53'; Gomes (yellow card) 90+3'	Stadium: Kenilworth Road; Attendance: 11,873; Referee: Tim Robinson
Note: Fixture was initially scheduled for 4 May, but was moved for live Sky Sports broadcast.

11 May 2024 37	Everton	1–0	Sheffield United	Walton, Liverpool
15:00 BST	Doucouré 31'; Calvert-Lewin (yellow card) 36'	Report	Robinson (yellow card) 36'; Arblaster (yellow card) 54'	Stadium: Goodison Park; Attendance: 39,221; Referee: Stuart Attwell

19 May 2024 38	Arsenal	2–1	Everton	Holloway
15:00 BST	Partey (yellow card) 39'; Tomiyasu 43'; Rice (yellow card) 68'; Timber (yellow card) 73'; Havertz (yellow card) 83', (goal) 89'	Report	Gueye 40'; Tarkowski (yellow card) 50'; Doucouré (yellow card) 54'; Pickford (yellow card) 83'	Stadium: Emirates Stadium; Attendance: 60,312; Referee: Michael Oliver

=== FA Cup ===
Everton entered in the third round, and were drawn away to Crystal Palace. They were then drawn at home to Luton Town in the fourth round.

Win Draw Loss Fixtures

4 January 2024 Third round	Crystal Palace	0–0	Everton	Selhurst
20:00 GMT	Eze (yellow card) 13'; Mateta (yellow card) 87'	Report	Calvert-Lewin (red card) 79'	Stadium: Selhurst Park; Attendance: 24,489; Referee: Chris Kavanagh

17 January 2024 Third round replay	Everton	1–0	Crystal Palace	Walton, Liverpool
19:45 GMT	Gomes 42'; Harrison (yellow card) 49'; Calvert-Lewin (yellow card) 86'; Virgínia (yellow card) 87'	Report	Lerma (yellow card) 41'; Andersen (yellow card) 86'	Stadium: Goodison Park; Attendance: 37,796; Referee: Tony Harrington

27 January 2024 Fourth round	Everton	1–2	Luton Town	Walton, Liverpool
15:00 GMT	Harrison 55'; Chermiti (yellow card) 90+1'	Report	Mykolenko 39' (o.g.); Burke (yellow card) 90+1'; Woodrow 90+6'	Stadium: Goodison Park; Attendance: 37,713; Referee: Simon Hooper

=== EFL Cup ===
Everton entered in the second round, and were drawn away to Doncaster Rovers. They were then drawn away to Aston Villa in the third round, at home to Burnley in the fourth round, and at home to Fulham in the quarter-finals.

Win Draw Loss Fixtures

30 August 2023 Second round	Doncaster Rovers	1–2	Everton	Doncaster
20:00 BST	Ironside 44'; Roberts (yellow card) 85'	Report	Beto 73'; Danjuma 88'	Stadium: Eco-Power Stadium; Attendance: 11,430; Referee: Tom Reeves
Note: Live on Sky Sports

27 September 2023 Third round	Aston Villa	1–2	Everton	Aston, Birmingham
19:45 BST	Watkins (yellow card) 46'; Digne (yellow card) 74'; Konsa (yellow card) 79'; Kamara 83'; Douglas Luiz (yellow card) 90+4'	Report	Garner 15'; Patterson (yellow card) 48'; Calvert-Lewin 50'; Tarkowski (yellow card) 66'; McNeil (yellow card) 90+4'	Stadium: Villa Park; Attendance: 23,851; Referee: Tony Harrington

1 November 2023 Fourth round	Everton	3–0	Burnley	Walton, Liverpool
19:45 GMT	Tarkowski 13'; Onana 53'; Young 90+2'	Report	Al-Dakhil (yellow card) 29'; Vitinho (yellow card) 58'	Stadium: Goodison Park; Attendance: 38,841; Referee: Michael Salisbury

19 December 2023 Quarter-finals	Everton	1–1 (6–7 p)	Fulham	Walton, Liverpool
19:45 GMT	Keane (yellow card) 39'; Patterson (yellow card) 50'; Beto 82'	Report	Keane 41' (o.g.); Tete (yellow card) 64'	Stadium: Goodison Park; Attendance: 38,715; Referee: Graham Scott
	Penalties
	Beto (penalty scored); McNeil (penalty scored); Keane (penalty scored); Danjuma (penalty scored); Onana (penalty missed); Tarkowski (penalty scored); Garner (penalty scored); Gueye (penalty missed)		(penalty scored) Pereira; (penalty scored) Cairney; (penalty scored) Palhinha; (penalty missed) Decordova-Reid; (penalty scored) Carlos Vinícius; (penalty scored) Tete; (penalty scored) Robinson; (penalty scored) Adarabioyo

== Statistics ==
=== Appearances and goals ===
No.	Pos	Nat	Player	Total		Premier League		FA Cup		EFL Cup	
No.	Pos	Nat	Player	Apps	Goals	Apps	Goals	Apps	Goals	Apps	Goals
Goalkeepers
1	GK	(England) ENG	Jordan Pickford	42	0	38	0	0	0	4	0
12	GK	(Portugal) POR	João Virgínia	3	0	0	0	3	0	0	0
31	GK	(England) ENG	Andy Lonergan	0	0	0	0	0	0	0	0
Defenders
2	DF	(Scotland) SCO	Nathan Patterson	26	0	9+11	0	2	0	3+1	0
5	DF	(England) ENG	Michael Keane	12	1	4+5	1	0	0	3	0
6	DF	(England) ENG	James Tarkowski	45	2	38	1	3	0	3+1	1
18	DF	(England) ENG	Ashley Young	34	1	27+4	0	0	0	1+2	1
19	DF	(Ukraine) UKR	Vitaliy Mykolenko	34	2	28	2	3	0	3	0
22	DF	(England) ENG	Ben Godfrey	16	0	13+2	0	0	0	1	0
23	DF	(Republic of Ireland) IRL	Séamus Coleman	13	0	8+4	0	1	0	0	0
32	DF	(England) ENG	Jarrad Branthwaite	41	3	35	3	3	0	3	0
Midfielders
8	MF	(Belgium) BEL	Amadou Onana	37	3	24+6	2	3	0	4	1
16	MF	(Mali) MLI	Abdoulaye Doucouré	35	7	32	7	0	0	1+2	0
20	MF	(England) ENG	Dele Alli	0	0	0	0	0	0	0	0
21	MF	(Portugal) POR	André Gomes	14	2	3+9	1	1+1	1	0	0
27	MF	(Senegal) SEN	Idrissa Gueye	29	4	25	4	0	0	1+3	0
37	MF	(England) ENG	James Garner	44	2	34+3	1	3	0	4	1
51	MF	(England) ENG	Lewis Warrington	1	0	0+1	0	0	0	0	0
62	MF	(England) ENG	Tyler Onyango	1	0	0+1	0	0	0	0	0
Forwards
7	FW	(England) ENG	Dwight McNeil	41	3	33+2	3	3	0	2+1	0
9	FW	(England) ENG	Dominic Calvert-Lewin	38	8	26+6	7	3	0	3	1
10	FW	(Netherlands) NED	Arnaut Danjuma	20	2	5+9	1	1+1	0	3+1	1
14	FW	(Guinea-Bissau) GBS	Beto	36	5	9+20	3	1+2	0	0+4	2
28	FW	(Portugal) POR	Youssef Chermiti	20	0	1+17	0	0+1	0	1	0
11	FW	(England) ENG	Jack Harrison	35	4	25+4	3	3	1	3	0
61	FW	(England) ENG	Lewis Dobbin	15	1	1+11	1	0+1	0	1+1	0
Players transferred/loaned out during the season
17	MF	(Nigeria) NGR	Alex Iwobi	2	0	2	0	0	0	0	0
13	FW	(France) FRA	Neal Maupay	3	0	1+1	0	0	0	0+1	0
47	FW	(England) ENG	Thomas Cannon	1	0	0+1	0	0	0	0	0

Last updated: 20 May 2024
Source: Competitions

=== Goalscorers ===
Last updated 19 May 2024

Rank	No.	Nat.	Player	Premier League	FA Cup	EFL Cup	Total
1	9	(England)	Dominic Calvert-Lewin	7	0	1	8
2	16	(Mali)	Abdoulaye Doucouré	7	0	0	7
3	14	(Guinea-Bissau)	Beto	3	0	2	5
4	11	(England)	Jack Harrison	3	1	0	4
5	27	(Senegal)	Idrissa Gueye	4	0	0	4
5	7	(England)	Dwight McNeil	3	0	0	3
5	32	(England)	Jarrad Branthwaite	3	0	0	3
5	8	(Belgium)	Amadou Onana	2	0	1	3
9	6	(England)	James Tarkowski	1	0	1	2
9	10	(Netherlands)	Arnaut Danjuma	1	0	1	2
9	19	(Ukraine)	Vitaliy Mykolenko	2	0	0	2
9	21	(Portugal)	Andre Gomes	1	1	0	2
9	37	(England)	James Garner	1	0	1	2
13	5	(England)	Michael Keane	1	0	0	1
13	18	(England)	Ashley Young	0	0	1	1
13	61	(England)	Lewis Dobbin	1	0	0	1
Totals				39	2	8	49
