= Nathan Patterson (footballer) =

Scottish footballer (born 2001)

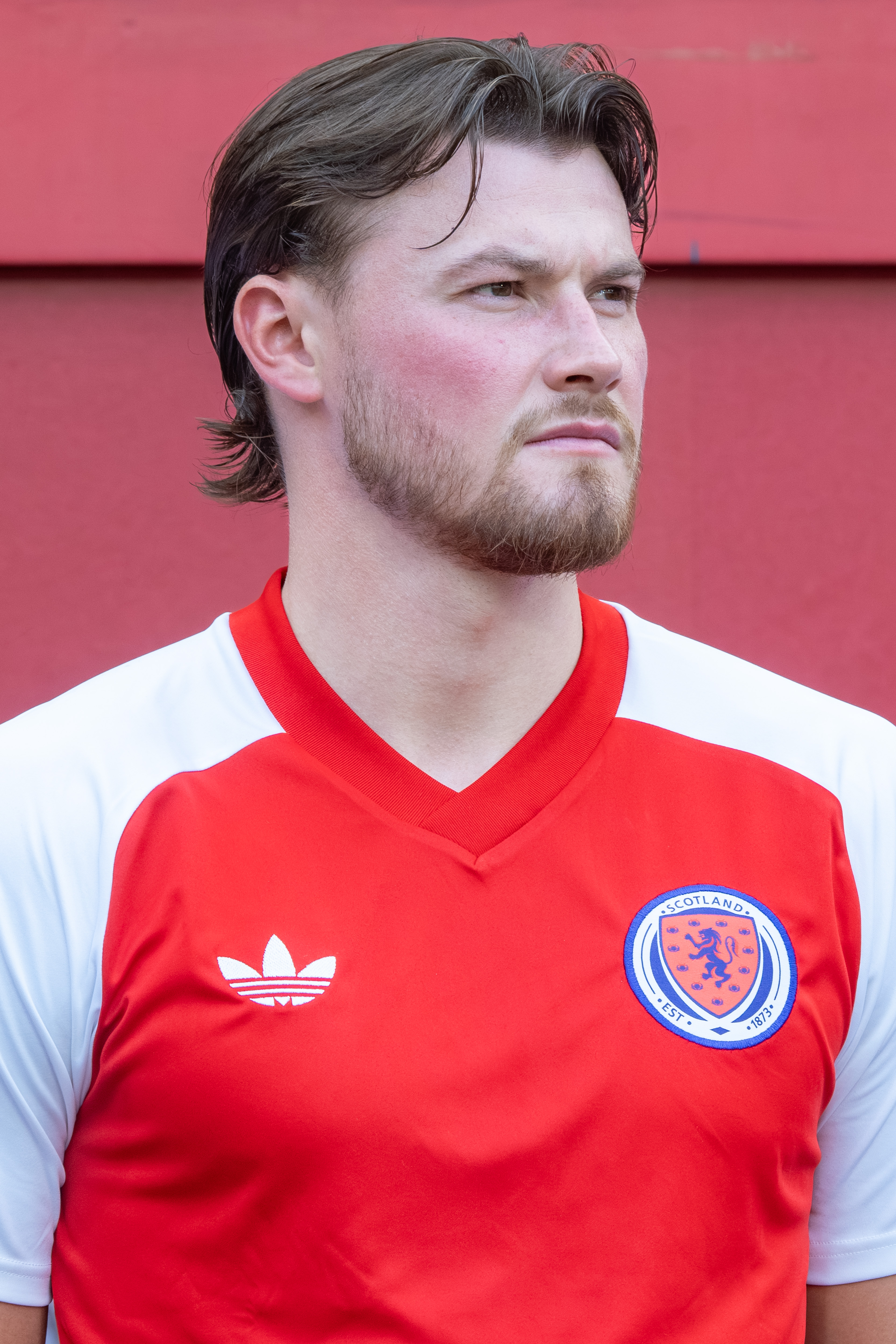
- Patterson with Scotland in 2026

Personal information
- Full name: Nathan Kenneth Patterson
- Date of birth: 16 October 2001 (age 25)
- Place of birth: Glasgow, Scotland
- Height: 6 ft 0 in (1.83 m)
- Position: Right-back

Team information
- Current team: Torino
- Number: 2

Youth career
- 2009–2020: Rangers

Senior career*
Years	Team	Apps	(Gls)
2020–2022	Rangers	13	(0)
2022–2026	Everton	56	(0)
2026–	Torino	1	(0)

International career^{‡}
2017–2018	Scotland U17	7	(1)
2018	Scotland U18	2	(0)
2019–2020	Scotland U19	6	(1)
2020–	Scotland U21	4	(2)
2021–	Scotland	31	(1)
- * Club domestic league appearances and goals as of 22:45, 4 May 2026 (UTC) ‡ National team caps and goals as of 22:55, 16 November 2026 (UTC)

Nathan Kenneth Patterson (born 16 October 2001) is a Scottish professional footballer who plays as a right-back for Serie A side Torino and the Scotland national team.

== Club career ==
=== Rangers ===
A Rangers youth graduate who attended Holyrood Secondary School in southern Glasgow as a participant in the Scottish Football Association's 'Performance Schools' development programme, Patterson signed a new contract on 21 December 2019, keeping him at the club until 2022. He made his debut on 17 January 2020, in a Scottish Cup match against Stranraer at Ibrox Stadium. He made his league debut against Kilmarnock on 22 August 2020, coming on as a substitute in the 86th minute in a 2–0 win.

Patterson made his European debut on 10 December 2020, starting in a 2–0 away win against Polish side Lech Poznań. He scored his first goal for the club on 25 February 2021, in a UEFA Europa League match against Royal Antwerp, scoring 16.6 seconds after coming on as a second-half substitute. Patterson played regularly for Rangers during the later part of their 2020–21 title-winning season, deputising for the injured James Tavernier, until he was suspended for breaching coronavirus pandemic rules.

=== Everton ===
On 4 January 2022, Patterson signed for Everton on a five-and-a-half-year deal. The transfer fee was officially undisclosed, though it was believed to have been in the region of £11 million including add-ons. (Note: The Times reported ((subscription required)) that the fee was £11 million inclusive of add-ons.) Having been signed by manager Rafael Benítez who was soon sacked, Patterson's Everton career got off to a slow start, initially playing for the under-23s rather than the first team. This trend continued for the entirety of the 2021–22 Premier League season, with Patterson making no first team appearances in the Premier League despite the club's continued high hopes for the player. These limited opportunities for Patterson were, until April, due to the team wanting to give Patterson the time to adjust to the pace and freneticism of the Premier League before handing him a full debut. However, Patterson was unable to play after from 10 April onwards due to an ankle injury sustained in Everton's final training session before playing West Ham on 3 April. This ankle injury required surgery and ruled Patterson out for the remainder of the season.

Patterson was named to start in all of Everton's four pre-season games before the commencement of the 2022–23 season. Throughout pre-season, he managed a total of two assists, both coming in the match against Blackpool (Vitaliy Mykolenko's 6th minute goal and Dele Alli's 64th minute goal). Patterson's positive performances in pre-season earned him the plaudits of both his manager and former footballers alike.

After suffering a serious injury against Chelsea on 15 April 2024, Patterson made his long-awaited return nearly ten months later in a 4–0 defeat to Manchester United.

=== Torino ===
On 1 September 2026, Patterson signed a three-year contract with Serie A side Torino.

== International career ==
Patterson has represented Scotland at various youth levels up to under-21s. He was added to the full national squad for the first time in May 2021, ahead of the delayed UEFA Euro 2020 tournament. Patterson made his full international debut in a pre-tournament friendly against Luxembourg, came off the bench during the Euros against Croatia at Hampden Park, and made his first start against Moldova in September of that year during 2022 FIFA World Cup qualification. On 12 November 2021, Patterson scored a first international goal when he opened the scoring in a vital 2–0 win away in Moldova before setting up Ché Adams for the second. This victory saw Scotland qualify for a World Cup play-off place.

Due to the injury he picked up while playing for Everton, Patterson missed out on UEFA Euro 2024.

On 19 May 2026, Patterson was selected in the 26-man squad for the 2026 FIFA World Cup.

== Personal life ==
In February 2021, Patterson was one of five Rangers players who were issued with a Fixed Penalty Notice by Police Scotland "for attending an illegal gathering of 10 people in a flat" in breach of lockdown rules during the coronavirus pandemic. Patterson and the other players were banned for six games by the SFA for the breach, although part of that sentence was suspended.

== Career statistics ==
=== Club ===
As of match played 26 August 2026

Appearances and goals by club, season and competition
Club	Season	League			National cup (Note: Includes Scottish Cup, FA Cup)		League cup (Note: Includes Scottish League Cup, EFL Cup)		Europe		Other		Total	
Club	Season	Division	Apps	Goals	Apps	Goals	Apps	Goals	Apps	Goals	Apps	Goals	Apps	Goals
Rangers	2019–20	Scottish Premiership	0	0	1	0	0	0	1 (Note: Appearance(s) in UEFA Europa League)	0	—		2	0
Rangers	2020–21	Scottish Premiership	7	0	2	1	0	0	5	1	—		14	2
Rangers	2021–22	Scottish Premiership	6	0	—		2	0	3	0	—		11	0
Rangers	Total		13	0	3	1	2	0	9	1	—		27	2
Rangers B	2019–20	—			—		—		—		6 (Note: Appearances in Scottish Challenge Cup)	0	6	0
Everton	2021–22	Premier League	0	0	1	0	—		—		—		1	0
Everton	2022–23	Premier League	19	0	0	0	2	0	—		—		21	0
Everton	2023–24	Premier League	20	0	2	0	4	0	—		—		26	0
Everton	2024–25	Premier League	10	0	1	0	0	0	—		—		11	0
Everton	2025–26	Premier League	7	0	1	0	0	0	—		—		8	0
Everton	2026–27	Premier League	0	0	—		1	0	—		—		1	0
Everton	Total		56	0	5	0	7	0	—		—		68	0
Torino	2026–27	Serie A	1	0	0	0	—		—		—		1	0
Career total			69	0	8	1	9	0	9	1	6	0	101	2

=== International ===
As of match played 16 November 2026

Appearances and goals by national team and year
National team	Year	Apps	Goals
Scotland	2021	6	1
Scotland	2022	5	0
Scotland	2023	8	0
Scotland	2024	2	0
Scotland	2025	2	0
Scotland	2026	8	0
Total		31	1

As of match played 16 November 2026
Scores and results list Scotland's goal tally first, score column indicates score after each Patterson goal.

List of international goals scored by Nathan Patterson
No.	Date	Venue	Cap	Opponent	Score	Result	Competition	Ref.
1	12 November 2021	Zimbru Stadium, Chișinău, Moldova	6	Moldova	1–0	2–0	2022 FIFA World Cup qualification	

== Honours ==
Rangers

- Scottish Premiership: 2020–21
