= Abdoulaye Doucouré =

Mali international footballer (born 1993)

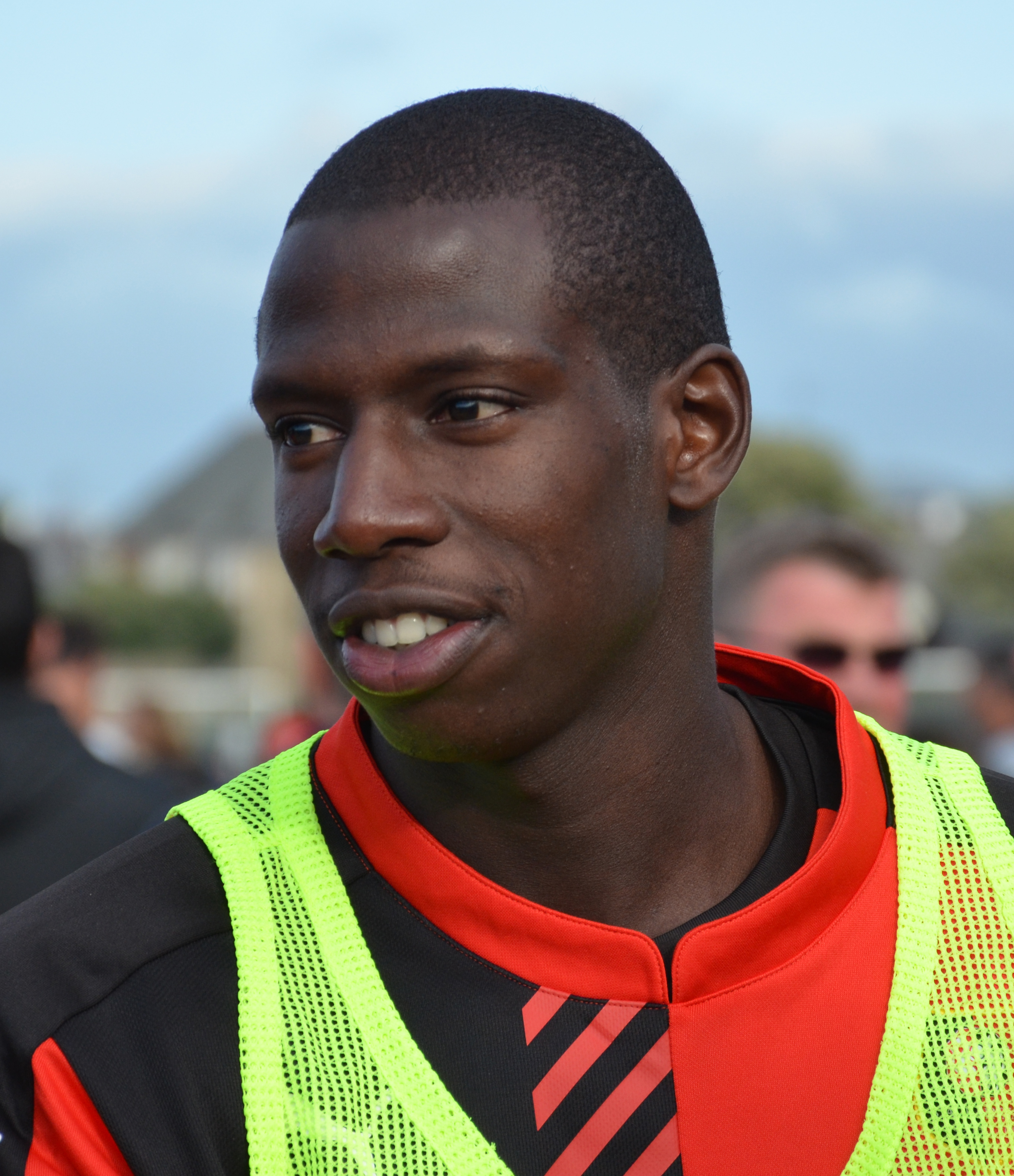
- Doucouré with Rennes in 2015

Personal information
- Full name: Abdoulaye Doucouré
- Date of birth: 1 January 1993 (age 33)
- Place of birth: Meulan-en-Yvelines, France
- Height: 1.84 m (6 ft 0 in)
- Position: Midfielder

Team information
- Current team: Charlotte FC
- Number: 6

Youth career
- 2004–2007: OFC Les Mureaux
- 2007–2012: Rennes

Senior career*
Years	Team	Apps	(Gls)
2010–2013	Rennes B	23	(2)
2012–2016	Rennes	75	(12)
2016–2020	Watford	129	(17)
2016	→ Granada (loan)	15	(0)
2020–2025	Everton	149	(19)
2025–2026	Neom	13	(0)
2026–	Charlotte FC	3	(1)

International career
2009–2010	France U17	19	(1)
2010	France U18	5	(1)
2011–2012	France U19	7	(0)
2012–2013	France U20	3	(1)
2014	France U21	1	(0)
2022	Mali	2	(0)
- * Club domestic league appearances and goals as of 19:43, 15 November 2026 (UTC)

Abdoulaye Doucouré (born 1 January 1993) is a professional footballer who plays as a midfielder for Major League Soccer club Charlotte FC. Born in France and a former French youth international, he represented the Mali national team.

Doucouré came through the youth system at Rennes before moving to Watford in 2016 and then Everton in 2020 for an undisclosed fee believed to be £20 million. Having made over 160 appearances for the club in five seasons, he departed the club in the summer of 2025, joining Neom.

== Early life ==
Doucouré was born in Meulan-en-Yvelines, to Malian parents.

== Club career ==
=== Rennes ===
Doucouré made his debut in the Ligue 1 during the 2012–13 season for Rennes, having come through their youth system.

=== Watford ===
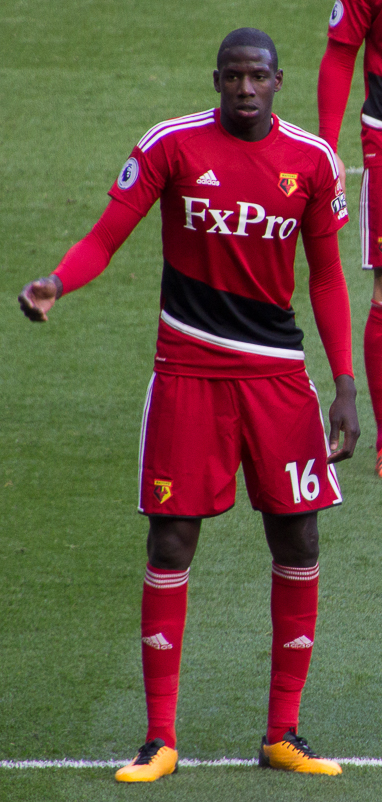
Doucouré playing for Watford in 2017

On 1 February 2016, Doucouré signed for Premier League club Watford for an undisclosed fee and immediately joined La Liga club Granada on loan. He made his first La Liga appearance one week later, when he came on as an 80th-minute substitute for Adalberto Peñaranda in a 1–2 home loss against Real Madrid. Doucouré scored his first goal for Watford on 4 March 2017, netting an injury time consolation as Watford lost 3–4 to Southampton.

Doucouré scored seven goals and made two assists in the 2017–18 season. He was named "Player of the Season" for the club at the end of the 2017–18 season.

In the 2018–19 season, Doucouré scored five goals and six assists. In Watford's 6–0 defeat in the 2019 FA Cup final, Doucouré was shown a yellow card after protesting a referee's penalty decision.

=== Everton ===
On 8 September 2020, Premier League club Everton announced that they had signed Doucouré from Watford for an undisclosed fee believed to be in the region of £20 million. He signed a three-year deal with a club option for a fourth season. Doucouré made his debut on 13 September during Everton's first game of the 2020–21 season, 1–0 win away from home against Tottenham Hotspur. Doucouré scored his first Everton goal with a robust header in a 3–2 away win against Fulham on 22 November in a Premier League fixture. He scored again against Manchester United in a 3–3 draw on 6 February 2021 at Old Trafford when he tapped in from close range. On 12 March, Everton manager Carlo Ancelotti said that Doucouré had suffered a fractured foot in training thus ruling him out for 8–10 weeks. Ancelotti said he hoped Doucouré would return to the team before the end of the season.

On 4 April 2023, Doucouré received a straight red card during Everton's 1–1 draw against Tottenham Hotspur for violent conduct after hitting Harry Kane in the face. On 23 May, the club said it was extending the player's contract by a year until the summer of 2024. Five days later, on the final matchday of the 2022–23 season, Doucouré scored one of the most consequential goals in the club's history to secure a 1–0 win over Bournemouth. Had Everton only drawn, they would have been overtaken by Leicester City on goal difference and been relegated to the second tier of English football for the first time since the 1950–51 season. Later that year, on 3 November, he signed a new contract until 2025.

On 20 May 2025, Doucouré announced he would be leaving Everton when his contract expired in the summer.

=== Neom ===
On August 10, 2025, Doucouré joined Saudi Pro League club Neom on a two-year deal.

=== Charlotte FC ===
On 10 October 2026, Doucouré signed for Major League Soccer club Charlotte FC.

== International career ==
Doucouré played for France at U21 level. In March 2019, he was approached by the Mali FA over representing the African country at international level. He is eligible to play for Mali, the country of his parents' origin, but rejected their approach.

In February 2020, Doucouré said in an interview that he was targeting a place in the France national team but he also remained open to representing the Mali national team. In September 2020, Doucouré was called up by Mali for upcoming matches against Ghana on 9 October and Iran on 13 October in Turkey, which he rejected due to his desire to play for France under Didier Deschamps.

In February 2022, Mali FA President Baviuex Touré told the media that he was in negotiation with Doucouré, hoping that he would switch his international allegiance from France in time to feature in their World Cup play-offs in March.

In March 2022, Doucouré finally accepted a call-up from Mali and he debuted with Mali in a 1–0 2022 World Cup qualification loss to Tunisia on 25 March 2022.

In September 2023, Doucouré had revealed that he would not be representing Mali for the foreseeable future as he wanted to focus on his club career, and because his father—who had initially wanted him to represent Mali—had recently died.

== Style of play ==
Former Everton manager Carlo Ancelotti has said of Doucouré that "he can play everywhere on the pitch. He can play number 10, in behind, in front of the defence, his work defensively is really good. He is learning a lot tactically as well. He has a fantastic ability for the transition when we catch the ball. He is fantastic box-to-box."

== Personal life ==
Doucouré lives with his family in Greater Manchester. He has seven siblings. His cousin Ladji Doucouré is a French track and field athlete.

Doucouré is a Muslim. He mentioned he often enjoys going to the mosque in his free time. He revealed that he always made Dua prior to matches, as he stated:

I always make dua [supplication], always pray for Allah to help us in games. Without my faith, I would not be in this position today.

== Career statistics ==
=== Club ===
As of match played 7 November 2026

Appearances and goals by club, season and competition
Club	Season	League			National cup (Note: Includes Coupe de France, FA Cup, King's Cup)		League cup (Note: Includes Coupe de la Ligue, EFL Cup)		Total	
Club	Season	Division	Apps	Goals	Apps	Goals	Apps	Goals	Apps	Goals
Rennes B	2010–11	CFA	6	0	—		—		6	0
Rennes B	2011–12	CFA 2	16	2	—		—		16	2
Rennes B	2012–13	CFA 2	1	0	—		—		1	0
Rennes B	Total		23	2	—		—		23	2
Rennes	2012–13	Ligue 1	4	1	0	0	0	0	4	1
Rennes	2013–14	Ligue 1	20	6	6	0	1	1	27	7
Rennes	2014–15	Ligue 1	35	3	3	2	3	0	41	5
Rennes	2015–16	Ligue 1	16	2	2	0	2	1	20	3
Rennes	Total		75	12	11	2	6	2	92	16
Granada (loan)	2015–16	La Liga	15	0	0	0	—		15	0
Watford	2016–17	Premier League	20	1	2	0	1	0	23	1
Watford	2017–18	Premier League	37	7	2	0	0	0	39	7
Watford	2018–19	Premier League	35	5	4	0	1	0	40	5
Watford	2019–20	Premier League	37	4	0	0	2	0	39	4
Watford	Total		129	17	8	0	4	0	141	17
Everton	2020–21	Premier League	29	2	3	1	2	0	34	3
Everton	2021–22	Premier League	30	2	3	0	1	0	34	2
Everton	2022–23	Premier League	25	5	1	0	1	0	27	5
Everton	2023–24	Premier League	32	7	0	0	3	0	35	7
Everton	2024–25	Premier League	33	3	2	0	1	1	36	4
Everton	Total		149	19	9	1	8	1	166	21
Neom	2025–26	Saudi Pro League	13	0	1	0	—		14	0
Charlotte FC	2026	Major League Soccer	3	1	—		—		3	1
Career total			407	51	29	3	18	3	454	57

=== International ===
Appearances and goals by national team and year
National team	Year	Apps	Goals
Mali	2022	2	0
Total		2	0

== Honours ==
Rennes

- Coupe de France runner-up: 2013–14

Watford

- FA Cup runner-up: 2018–19

Individual

- Watford Player of the Season: 2017–18
