= James Tarkowski =

English footballer (born 1992)

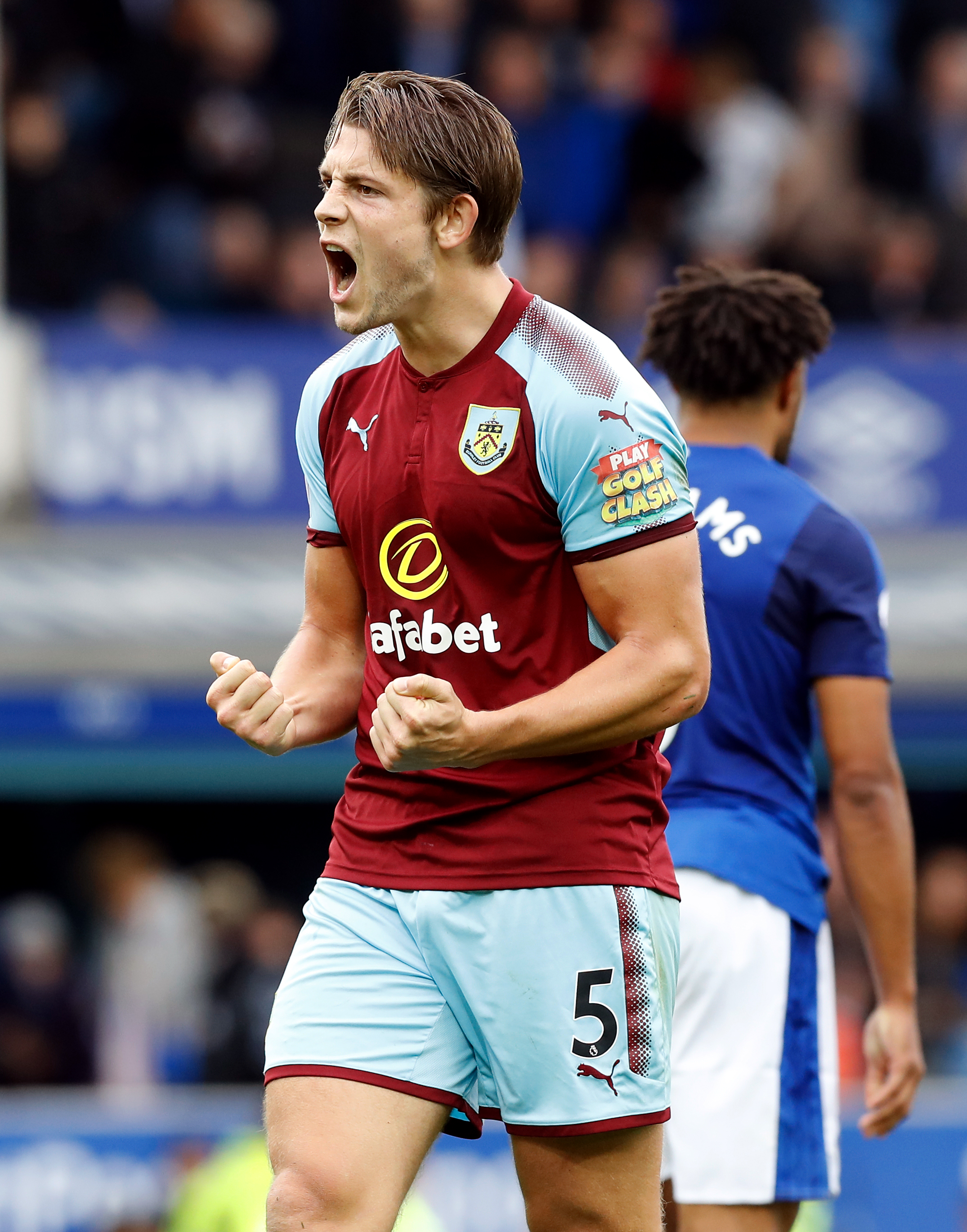
- Tarkowski playing for Burnley in 2017

Personal information
- Full name: James Alan Tarkowski
- Date of birth: 19 November 1992 (age 33)
- Place of birth: Manchester, England
- Height: 6 ft 1 in (1.85 m)
- Position: Centre-back

Team information
- Current team: Everton
- Number: 6

Youth career
- Blackburn Rovers

Senior career*
Years	Team	Apps	(Gls)
2008–2009	Maine Road	0	(0)
2009–2014	Oldham Athletic	74	(5)
2014–2016	Brentford	70	(4)
2016–2022	Burnley	198	(7)
2022–	Everton	156	(6)

International career
2018	England	2	(0)
- * Club domestic league appearances and goals as of 22:21, 6 November 2026 (UTC)

James Alan Tarkowski (born 19 November 1992) is an English professional footballer who plays as centre-back for and captains Premier League club Everton.

Tarkowski began his professional career at Oldham Athletic of League One, where he made 89 appearances across all competitions. In January 2014, he moved to Brentford for an undisclosed fee, winning promotion to the Championship in his first season. Two years later he signed for Burnley. After six seasons at Turf Moor, he moved to Everton, quickly becoming a consistent, regular defender for the club. In 2026, he was appointed captain of Everton, succeeding previous captain Séamus Coleman.

Eligible to represent Poland through his grandfather, Tarkowski made his senior debut for England in March 2018.

== Early and personal life ==
James Alan Tarkowski was born on 19 November 1992 in Manchester and grew up in New Moston. He attended New Moston Primary School and Failsworth High School, which he left in 2009. He is of Polish descent through his grandfather, Boleslaw Tarkowski, who was born in Poland.

Tarkowski began his career in the youth system at Blackburn Rovers, before being released at the age of 14. After his spell at Blackburn, Tarkowski had a stint playing senior football at Maine Road in the North West Counties League.

He studied for a Diploma in Football Sport Directorship at the Professional Footballers' Association business school.

== Club career ==
=== Oldham Athletic ===
==== Early years ====
Tarkowski joined League One club Oldham Athletic on a two-year scholarship in May 2009. He made his reserve-team debut in October 2009. A centre-back, Tarkowski was called up to the first team for the first time for a league match versus Plymouth Argyle on 15 January 2011. His senior debut came on 22 January, coming on as an 80th-minute substitute for the injured Neal Trotman in a 2–1 home win over Brentford. Tarkowski made his first Latics start in a 1–0 defeat to Leyton Orient on 12 March and played the full 90 minutes. He was awarded a two-year professional contract by the club in May 2011. He made 9 appearances during the second half of the 2010–11 season.

Tarkowski had to wait until 10 December 2011 to make his first appearance of the 2011–12 season, when he came on as a 61st-minute substitute for Jean-Yves Mvoto in a 2–0 home defeat to Sheffield Wednesday. A half time substitute appearance in Oldham's 2–1 Football League Trophy Northern Area final first leg defeat to Chesterfield on 30 January 2012 kicked off a run which saw Tarkowski included in almost all of Oldham's first-team squads until the end of the season. Tarkowski crowned his run of appearances by scoring his first senior goal for the club on the final day of the season in a 2–1 win over Carlisle United. He made 18 appearances during the 2011–12 season and scored one goal.

==== Breakthrough ====
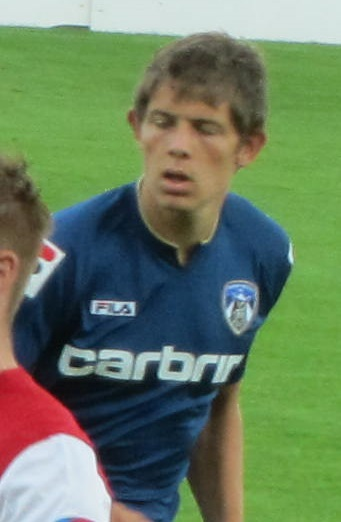
Tarkowski playing for Oldham Athletic in 2012

Tarkowski began the 2012–13 season as a first-choice centre-back alongside Jean-Yves Mvoto and started Oldham's first six games of the season. He scored his first goal of the season in a 2–0 league win over Crewe Alexandra on 2 October 2012. Tarkowski played a part in Oldham's run to the fifth round of the FA Cup, playing in the first round win over Conference Premier team Kidderminster Harriers and starting in the home draw and away replay defeat to Premier League team Everton in the fifth round. He scored his second goal of the season in a 2–1 league win over Stevenage on 19 February 2013. Tarkowski made 26 appearances and scored two goals during the 2012–13 season. He signed a new two-year contract in the summer of 2013.

Tarkowski began the 2013–14 season solidly, scoring Oldham's first goal in a 4–3 away league win over Stevenage on the opening day. He was picked by the Latics supporters as Oldham's Player of the Month for August 2013. Now lining up at centre-back alongside Jonathan Grounds, Tarkowski scored his second goal in a 2–1 defeat to Preston North End on 9 September 2013. Tarkowski was an ever-present in Oldham's runs to the Northern Area semi-final of the Football League Trophy and the third round of the FA Cup. He started the FA Cup third round tie against Premier League team Liverpool at Anfield and scored an 82nd minute own goal, which consigned the Latics to a 2–0 defeat. Tarkowski's form saw him offered a new contract extending until the end of the 2016–17 season on 22 January 2014, but he departed Boundary Park 9 days later. During his time with the Latics, Tarkowski made 89 appearances and scored six goals.

=== Brentford ===
Tarkowski signed for League One club Brentford on a three-and-a-half-year contract for an undisclosed fee on 31 January 2014. After a period on the bench, he made his Brentford debut with a start in a 0–0 draw away to Carlisle United on 1 March. He scored his first goal for the club on his third appearance, heading in to send the Bees on their way to a 2–0 victory over Tranmere Rovers on 11 March. Four days later, Tarkowski was sent off for the second time in his career during a 1–0 win over Leyton Orient. Following Brentford's promotion to the Championship on 18 April, Tarkowski scored his second goal for the club in a 2–2 draw at Milton Keynes Dons on 21 April. He finished the 2013–14 season with 13 appearances and two goals.

Tarkowski began his first season at Championship level as an ever-present in the Bees' league matches. He suffered a dip in form in September and early October, stepping up to take his first penalty for the club in a league match versus Leeds United on 27 September and hammering the ball over the bar. He was spared his blushes, with Jota and Alan McCormack on target in the eventual 2–0 win. Tarkowski gave away a penalty in a 2–1 defeat to Watford on 30 September and received his fourth yellow card of the season (his third in four matches). Another yellow card in a 0–0 draw with Wigan Athletic on 18 October saw him incur a suspension and he failed to appear again until 28 December, scoring what proved to be Wolverhampton Wanderers' winner with an own goal in a 2–1 defeat. Despite the blunder, Tarkowski held onto his starting place and scored his first goal of the season against Reading on 25 April 2015, making sure of the points with the second in a 2–0 win. Tarkowski had the opportunity to convert a late penalty to make it two goals in two games in the following match against Wigan Athletic, but his miss made little difference with the Bees already 3–0 ahead. He appeared in both legs of Brentford's 5–1 playoff semi-final aggregate defeat to Middlesbrough and finished the 2014–15 season with 38 appearances and one goal.

Tarkowski helped salvage a 1 –1 draw with Ipswich Town on the opening day of the 2015–16 season, assisting Andre Gray to score in stoppage time, before scoring an 96th-minute equaliser to earn a place in the Football League Team of the Week. He suffered a displaced fracture of the nose in the following match versus Bristol City, but kept his place alongside Harlee Dean until suffering a calf injury in a 1–1 draw with Leeds United on 12 September. He missed two matches before being sent off on his return in a 2–1 defeat to Sheffield Wednesday. Amidst a number of transfer bids, Tarkowski was internally disciplined for refusing to play in Brentford's match versus Burnley on 15 January 2016, for which he later apologised. He failed to appear for the Bees again and departed Griffin Park two weeks later, having made 74 appearances and scored four goals in two years with the club.

=== Burnley ===
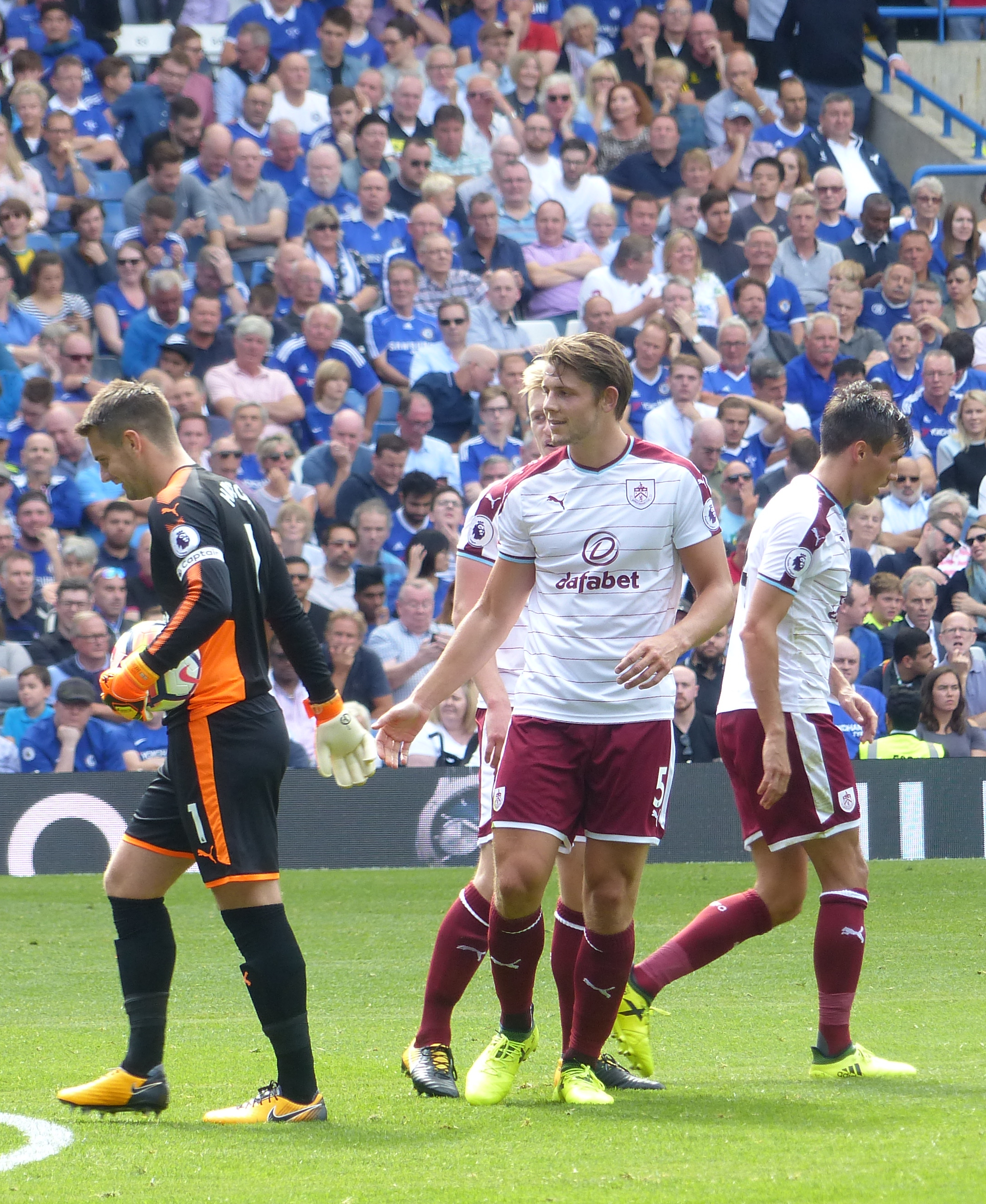
Tarkowski (centre) playing for Burnley in 2017

On 1 February 2016, Tarkowski signed a three-and-a-half-year contract with Championship club Burnley for an undisclosed fee. Tarkowski made his club debut on 20 February against Rotherham United, entering as a substitute in the first half for Michael Keane, who was forced off with a head injury. Tarkowski deputised for Keane for the next two games, with Burnley victorious against Nottingham Forest and Bolton Wanderers. However, Keane was preferred by manager Sean Dyche at right centre-back upon his return to fitness as Tarkowski was limited to one substitution appearance the rest of the season. In third position in the table at the time of Tarkowski's signing, Burnley went unbeaten the rest of the season as they won their third ever second-tier title and direct promotion to the Premier League on their first attempt.

Tarkowski was handed the captain's armband for Burnley's 1–0 extra-time defeat to fourth-tier Accrington Stanley in the EFL Cup on 24 August, after Dyche had made 10 changes to the team that upset Liverpool four days prior. Tarkowski made his Premier League debut on 27 August at Chelsea, coming on as a substitute and receiving a booking for a foul in the run-up to Chelsea's final goal in the 3–0 defeat. Unable to crack the preferred centre-back partnership of Keane and Ben Mee, Tarkowski received scant playing time, despite being an ever-present on the bench. He was a halftime substitution on 23 April 2017 against Manchester United for Mee, who left with a shin injury, opening the door for his first Premier League start on 29 April against Crystal Palace. Tarkowski endured being hit by an object thrown by a Palace fan during celebrations of Ashley Barnes' opening goal en route to a clean sheet. Manager Dyche lauded his performance as "outstanding". Tarkowski would retain his place in the team for Burnley's final four fixtures, during which Burnley ensured their participation in the next edition.

During the summer transfer window, teammate Michael Keane departed for Everton, allowing Tarkowski to line up with Mee in the centre of Burnley's defence on a full-time basis. Assigned the shirt number 26 initially, Tarkowski assumed the number 5 shirt vacated by Keane ahead of the season. Tarkowski's performance against Crystal Palace on 10 September was deemed Man of the Match worthy by Sky Sports, as Tarkowski held Benteke and Palace without a goal. His 17 clearances in the match were the most by anyone in the Premier League that season, besting a mark previously held by himself in Burnley's surprise opening day victory over Chelsea.

He scored in Burnley's opening game defeat against Brighton & Hove Albion in the 2021–22 Premier League season. On 10 June, Burnley announced Tarkowski would leave the club at the end of June when his contract expired.

=== Everton ===
On 2 July 2022, Tarkowski signed for Premier League club Everton on a free transfer following his release from Burnley, signing a four-year contract. On 6 August, Tarkowski made his debut for the club in a 1–0 home defeat against Chelsea in the Premier League. On 30 January 2023, Sean Dyche was appointed as Everton's manager, reuniting Tarkowski with his former coach at Burnley. On 4 February, in Dyche's first match in charge of Everton, Tarkowski scored the only goal of the match as Everton beat league leaders Arsenal 1–0 at Goodison Park. In the 2022–23 season, he was the only outfield player to play all 3,420 minutes in the Premier League. Furthermore, he managed to produce the most blocks during the season with a total of 76. He finished the following 2023–24 season as the player with the most aerial duels in the league during 144 occasions. In addition, he became the first player in league's history to make more than 50 blocks in three consecutive seasons.

On 12 February 2025, in the last Merseyside derby at Goodison Park, Tarkowski, playing as captain, scored a last-minute equaliser as Everton drew 2–2 with league leaders Liverpool.

On 8 October 2025, Everton announced that a two-year contract extension was triggered for Tarkowski, running until 2028.

== International career ==
Tarkowski was eligible to play for Poland through his grandfather but preferred to play for England, stating "I've always seen myself as an English person so to play for Poland would be difficult." On 15 March 2018, he was named in the England squad for pre-2018 FIFA World Cup friendlies against the Netherlands and Italy in March. He made his debut on 27 March when starting in the 1–1 draw with Italy at Wembley Stadium.

On 16 May 2018, he was one of five players named on standby for Gareth Southgate's 23-man England national team squad for the World Cup, but Tarkowski was reported to have withdrawn from the standby list later for a hernia operation.

== Career statistics ==
=== Club ===
As of match played 2 November 2026

Appearances and goals by club, season and competition
Club	Season	League			FA Cup		League Cup		Europe		Other		Total	
Club	Season	Division	Apps	Goals	Apps	Goals	Apps	Goals	Apps	Goals	Apps	Goals	Apps	Goals
Oldham Athletic	2010–11	League One	9	0	0	0	0	0	—		0	0	9	0
Oldham Athletic	2011–12	League One	16	1	0	0	0	0	—		2 (Note: Appearance(s) in Football League Trophy)	0	18	1
Oldham Athletic	2012–13	League One	21	2	3	0	1	0	—		1	0	26	2
Oldham Athletic	2013–14	League One	26	2	5	0	1	0	—		4	1	36	3
Oldham Athletic	Total		72	5	8	0	2	0	—		7	1	89	6
Brentford	2013–14	League One	13	2	—		—		—		—		13	2
Brentford	2014–15	Championship	34	1	1	0	1	0	—		2 (Note: Appearances in Championship play-offs)	0	38	1
Brentford	2015–16	Championship	23	1	0	0	0	0	—		—		23	1
Brentford	Total		70	4	1	0	1	0	—		2	0	74	4
Burnley	2015–16	Championship	4	0	—		—		—		—		4	0
Burnley	2016–17	Premier League	19	0	4	0	1	0	—		—		24	0
Burnley	2017–18	Premier League	31	0	0	0	2	0	—		—		33	0
Burnley	2018–19	Premier League	35	3	2	0	0	0	5 (Note: Appearances in UEFA Europa League)	0	—		42	3
Burnley	2019–20	Premier League	38	2	2	0	0	0	—		—		40	2
Burnley	2020–21	Premier League	36	1	2	0	1	0	—		—		39	1
Burnley	2021–22	Premier League	35	1	1	0	1	0	—		—		37	1
Burnley	Total		198	7	11	0	5	0	5	0	—		219	7
Everton	2022–23	Premier League	38	1	1	0	1	0	—		—		40	1
Everton	2023–24	Premier League	38	1	3	0	4	1	—		—		45	2
Everton	2024–25	Premier League	33	1	1	0	0	0	—		—		34	1
Everton	2025–26	Premier League	37	2	1	0	2	0	—		—		40	2
Everton	2026–27	Premier League	9	1	0	0	2	0	—		—		11	1
Everton	Total		155	6	6	0	9	1	—		—		170	7
Career total			495	22	26	0	17	1	5	0	9	1	552	24

=== International ===
Appearances and goals by national team and year
National team	Year	Apps	Goals
England	2018	2	0
Total		2	0

== Honours ==
Brentford

- Football League One second-place promotion: 2013–14

Individual

- Oldham Athletic Player of the Month: August 2013
