= Francis Gomez (footballer) =

Gambian footballer

Personal information
- Full name: Francis Gomez Tambadou
- Date of birth: 28 June 2006 (age 20)
- Place of birth: Serekunda, The Gambia
- Height: 1.75 m (5 ft 9 in)
- Position: Defensive midfielder

Team information
- Current team: Everton
- Number: 82

Youth career
- Kanifing East FC
- 2024: HB Abuja
- 2024: Sporting Supreme
- 2024–: Everton
- 2024–2025: → Lyon (loan)

International career^{‡}
Years	Team	Apps	(Gls)
2025–	The Gambia	1	(0)
- ‡ National team caps and goals as of 13:23, 30 May 2025 (UTC)

Francis Gomez Tambadou (born 28 June 2006) is a Gambian professional footballer who plays as a defensive midfielder for Everton U21, and The Gambia national team.

== Club career ==
Gomez began playing football locally in The Gambia with Kanifing Football Academy, before moving to Nigeria with HB Abuja and Sporting Supreme. On 30 August 2024, he was joined the youth academy of the English club Everton, immediately joining the French club Lyon on loan. On 8 February 2025, his loan with Lyon was cut short and he returned to train with the Everton U21s.

== International career ==
On 4 June 2025, Gomez was called up to The Gambia national team for a set of friendlies. He debuted for The Gambia in a friendly 1–1 tie with Uganda on 9 June 2025.

== Career statistics ==
=== Club ===
As of match played 25 November 2025

Appearances and goals by club, season and competition
Club	Season	League			FA Cup		League cup (Note: Includes National League Cup)		Other		Total	
Club	Season	Division	Apps	Goals	Apps	Goals	Apps	Goals	Apps	Goals	Apps	Goals
Everton U21	2025–26	—			—		3	0	3 (Note: Appearance(s) in EFL Trophy)	0	6	0
Career total			—		—		3	0	3	0	6	0

=== International ===
As of match played 9 June 2025

Appearances and goals by national team and year
National team	Year	Apps	Goals
The Gambia	2025	1	0
Total		1	0
