= 2025–26 Everton F.C. season =

English football club season

Everton
2025–26 season
- Owner: The Friedkin Group
- Chairman: Dan Friedkin
- Manager: David Moyes
- Stadium: Hill Dickinson Stadium
- Premier League: 13th
- FA Cup: Third round
- EFL Cup: Third round
- Top goalscorer: League: Beto (9); All: Beto (10)
- Highest home attendance: 52,590 (v. Sunderland, Premier League, 17 May 2026)
- Lowest home attendance: 48,583 (v. Mansfield Town, EFL Cup, 27 August 2025)
- Average home league attendance: 52,132
- Biggest win: 3–0 (v. Nottingham Forest (H), Premier League, 6 December 2025); 3–0 (v. Chelsea (H), Premier League, 21 March 2026)
- Biggest defeat: 0–3 (v. Tottenham Hotspur (H), Premier League, 26 October 2025); 1–4 (v. Newcastle United (H), Premier League, 29 November 2025)
Home colours	Away colours	Third colours

The 2025–26 season was the 148th season in the history of Everton Football Club, and the club's 72nd consecutive season in the top flight of English football. In addition to the domestic league, the club also participated in the FA Cup and the EFL Cup.

This season marked the first campaign at the club's new ground, the Hill Dickinson Stadium.

== Kits ==
Home	Home Alt.	Home Alt. 2
Away	Away Alt.	Away Alt. 2	Away Alt. 3
Third
Fourth

== Transfers and contracts ==
=== In ===
Date	Pos.	Player	From	Fee	Ref.
1 June 2025 (Note: The transfer was announced on 31 May, and would become official on July 1 once the transfer window had reopened)	MF	(Argentina) Charly Alcaraz	(Brazil) Flamengo	£13,000,000	
9 July 2025	FW	(France) Thierno Barry	(Spain) Villarreal	£26,000,000	
15 July 2025	GK	(Republic of Ireland) Mark Travers	(England) Bournemouth	£4,000,000	
29 July 2025	DF	(Morocco) Adam Aznou	(Germany) Bayern Munich	£7,800,000	
6 August 2025	MF	(England) Kiernan Dewsbury-Hall	(England) Chelsea	£25,000,000	
15 August 2025	GK	(Wales) Tom King	(England) Wolverhampton Wanderers	Undisclosed	
15 August 2025	DF	(England) Reuben Gokah (Note: Signed initially for the Under-18s)	(England) Charlton Athletic	Undisclosed	
25 August 2025	FW	(England) Tyler Dibling	(England) Southampton	£35,000,000	
Total				£110,800,000	

=== Out ===
Date	Pos.	Player	To	Fee	Ref.
30 June 2025	FW	(France) Neal Maupay	(France) Marseille	£3,400,000	
24 July 2025	MF	(England) Jenson Metcalfe	(England) Bradford City	Undisclosed	
1 September 2025	FW	(Portugal) Youssef Chermiti	(Scotland) Rangers	£10,000,000	
16 January 2026	GK	(England) Harry Tyrer	(Wales) Cardiff City	Undisclosed	
Total				£13,400,000	

=== Loaned in ===
Date	Pos.	Player	From	Date until	Ref.
12 August 2025	FW	(England) Jack Grealish	(England) Manchester City	31 May 2026	
1 September 2025	MF	(Germany) Merlin Röhl	(Germany) SC Freiburg	31 May 2026	
2 February 2026	FW	(England) Tyrique George	(England) Chelsea	31 May 2026	

=== Loaned out ===
Date	Pos.	Player	To	Date until	Ref.
18 August 2025	FW	(England) Francis Okoronkwo	(England) Lincoln City	6 January 2026 (Note: On 6 January, Okoronkwo was recalled from his season-long loan at Lincoln and subsequently joined Doncaster on loan)	
18 August 2025	FW	(Netherlands) Martin Sherif	(England) Rotherham United	31 December 2025 (Note: On 31 December, Sherif was recalled from his loan at Rotherham)	
29 August 2025	GK	(England) Fraser Barnsley	(England) Marine	31 May 2026	
1 September 2025	FW	(England) Isaac Heath	(England) Accrington Stanley	31 May 2026	
1 September 2025	MF	(England) Tyler Onyango	(England) Stockport County	31 May 2026	
1 September 2025	MF	(England) Harrison Armstrong	(England) Preston North End	1 January 2026 (Note: On 1 January, Armstrong was recalled from his loan at Preston)	
6 January 2026	FW	(England) Francis Okoronkwo	(England) Doncaster Rovers	31 May 2026	
13 January 2026	DF	(England) George Finney	(Scotland) Ayr United	31 May 2026	
16 January 2026	DF	(England) William Tamen	(England) Tranmere Rovers	31 May 2026	
23 January 2026	DF	(England) Roman Dixon	(England) Stockport County	31 May 2026	
31 January 2026	FW	(Wales) George Morgan	(France) Cannes	31 May 2026	
1 February 2026	DF	(England) Elijah Campbell	(England) Port Vale	31 May 2026	
1 February 2026	FW	(Netherlands) Martin Sherif	(England) Port Vale	31 May 2026	
2 February 2026	MF	(Northern Ireland) Jack Patterson	(Poland) ŁKS Łódź	31 May 2026	
13 February 2026	GK	(England) George Pickford	(England) Southport	31 May 2026	

=== Released / Out of contract ===
Date	Pos.	Player	Subsequent club	Join date	Ref.
30 June 2025	GK	(Slovenia) Žan-Luk Leban	(Slovenia) NK Celje	1 July 2025	
30 June 2025	MF	(Scotland) Matthew Apter	(Wales) Cardiff City	3 July 2025	
30 June 2025	DF	(Jamaica) Mason Holgate	(Qatar) Al-Gharafa	16 July 2025	
30 June 2025	MF	(Scotland) Luke Butterfield	(England) Chesterfield	18 July 2025	
30 June 2025	DF	(England) Ashley Young	(England) Ipswich Town	23 July 2025	
30 June 2025	GK	(Portugal) João Virgínia	(Portugal) Sporting CP	25 July 2025	
30 June 2025	GK	(Bosnia and Herzegovina) Asmir Begović	(England) Leicester City	29 July 2025	
30 June 2025	MF	(Mali) Abdoulaye Doucouré	(Saudi Arabia) Neom Sports Club	10 August 2025	
30 June 2025	FW	(England) Dominic Calvert-Lewin	(England) Leeds United	15 August 2025	
30 June 2025	DF	(England) Jack Tierney	(England) Marine	12 September 2025	
30 June 2025	MF	(England) Owen Barker	(England) Bury	10 October 2025	
30 June 2025	GK	(England) Billy Crellin	(Northern Ireland) Glentoran	30 October 2025	
30 June 2025	DF	(England) Jack Butler			

=== New contract ===
Date	Pos.	Player	Contract until	Ref.
First Team
27 June 2025	DF	(Republic of Ireland) Seamus Coleman	30 June 2026	
2 July 2025	DF	(England) Jarrad Branthwaite	30 June 2030	
4 July 2025	DF	(England) Michael Keane	30 June 2026	
7 July 2025	MF	(Senegal) Idrissa Gueye	30 June 2026 (Note: Option for a further year)	
8 October 2025	DF	(England) James Tarkowski	30 June 2028	
16 October 2025	GK	(England) Jordan Pickford	30 June 2029	
23 January 2026	MF	(England) James Garner	30 June 2030	
23 April 2026	DF	(England) Michael Keane	30 June 2027	
Academy
1 July 2025	DF	(England) Elijah Campbell	30 June 2027	
2 July 2025	MF	(England) Harvey Foster	30 June 2027 (Note: First professional contract)	
4 July 2025	DF	(England) Luca Davis	30 June 2027	
5 July 2025	FW	(Scotland) Ceiran Loney	30 June 2027	
7 July 2025	DF	(Wales) Aled Thomas	30 June 2027	
8 July 2025	FW	(Germany) Coby Ebere	30 June 2027	
9 July 2025	MF	(Northern Ireland) Jack Patterson	30 June 2027	
10 July 2025	FW	(England) Isaac Heath	30 June 2027	
11 July 2025	DF	(England) George Finney	30 June 2027	
12 July 2025	DF	(England) Joshua van Schoor	30 June 2027	
15 July 2025	MF	(England) Callum Bates	30 June 2027	
25 July 2025	GK	(Northern Ireland) Fraser Barnsley	30 June 2027	
28 August 2025	FW	(England) Justin Clarke	30 June 2028	
22 October 2025	FW	(England) Ray Robert	30 June 2028	
8 January 2026	MF	(England) Amari Moses	30 June 2028	
14 January 2026	MF	(England) Malik Olayiwola	30 June 2028	
15 January 2026	DF	(Scotland) John Dodds	30 June 2028	
29 January 2026	DF	(Wales) Luis Gardner	30 June 2028	
31 January 2026	FW	(Wales) George Morgan	30 June 2028	
12 February 2026	DF	(England) Reuben Gokah	30 June 2028	
13 February 2026	GK	(England) George Pickford	30 June 2028	
25 March 2026	MF	(Northern Ireland) Freddie Murdock	30 June 2028	

== Pre-season and friendlies ==
On 3 June, Everton announced their first two pre-season friendlies, against Accrington Stanley and Blackburn Rovers followed by the Summer Series in the United States with matches versus Bournemouth, West Ham United and Manchester United. Two weeks later, a home friendly against Roma was added.

Win Draw Loss Fixtures

15 July 2025 Friendly	Accrington Stanley	1–1	Everton	Accrington
19:45 BST	Ward 50'	Report	Beto 79' (pen.)	Stadium: Crown Ground; Attendance: 3,875; Referee: Matt Corlett

19 July 2025 Friendly	Blackburn Rovers	1–0	Everton	Blackburn
15:00 BST	De Neve 7'; Travis (yellow card) 40'	Report	Gueye (yellow card) 40'	Stadium: Ewood Park; Attendance: 11,399; Referee: Anthony Backhouse

22 July 2025 Friendly	Everton	2–1	Port Vale	Liverpool
13:00 BST	Alcaraz; Garner	Report	Paton 2'	Stadium: Hill Dickinson Stadium; Attendance: 0 (behind closed doors)

26 July 2025 Summer Series	Everton	0–3	Bournemouth	East Rutherford
16:00 EDT	Garner (yellow card) 27'; Mykolenko (yellow card) 67'	Report	Billing 55'; Ouattara 59'; Adu-Adjei 69'; Mepham (yellow card) 85'	Stadium: MetLife Stadium; Attendance: 10,000; Referee: Guido Gonzales Jr.

30 July 2025 Summer Series	West Ham United	2–1	Everton	Chicago
17:30 CDT	Paquetá 41'; Potts (yellow card) 43'; Füllkrug 64'	Report	Keane (yellow card) 12'; Gueye 17'; Garner (yellow card) 90+4'	Stadium: Soldier Field; Attendance: 58,927; Referee: Rosendo Mendoza

3 August 2025 Summer Series	Manchester United	2–2	Everton	Atlanta
17:00 EDT	Fernandes 19' (pen.), (yellow card) 75'; Mount 69'	Report	Ndiaye 40', (yellow card) 75'; Heaven 75' (o.g.)	Stadium: Mercedes-Benz Stadium; Referee: Thomas Bramall

9 August 2025 Friendly	Everton	0–1	Roma	Liverpool
15:00 BST		Report	Soulé 70'	Stadium: Hill Dickinson Stadium; Attendance: 50,837; Referee: Peter Bankes

== Competitions ==
=== Overall record ===
Competition	First match	Last match	Starting round	Final position	Record							
Competition	First match	Last match	Starting round	Final position	Pld	W	D	L	GF	GA	GD	Win %
Premier League	18 August 2025	24 May 2026	Matchday 1	13th	38	13	10	15	47	50	−3	34.21
FA Cup	10 January 2026		Third round	Third round	1	0	1	0	1	1	+0	0.00
EFL Cup	27 August 2025	23 September 2025	Second round	Third round	2	1	0	1	2	2	+0	50.00
Total					41	14	11	16	50	53	−3	34.15

Source: Soccerway

=== Premier League ===
==== League table ====
Pos	Team	Pld	W	D	L	GF	GA	GD	Pts	Qualification or relegation
11	Fulham	38	15	7	16	47	51	−4	52	
12	Newcastle United	38	14	7	17	53	55	−2	49	
13	Everton	38	13	10	15	47	50	−3	49	
14	Leeds United	38	11	14	13	49	56	−7	47	
15	Crystal Palace	38	11	12	15	41	51	−10	45	Qualification for the Europa League league phase (Note: Crystal Palace qualified for the Europa League league phase as the 2025–26 UEFA Conference League winners.)

Source: Premier League
Rules for classification: 1) Points; 2) Goal difference; 3) Goals scored; 4) If the champions, relegated teams or qualified teams for UEFA competitions cannot be determined by rules 1 to 3, rules 4.1 to 4.3 are applied – 4.1) Points gained in head-to-head record between such teams; 4.2) Away goals scored in head-to-head record between such teams; 4.3) Play-offs

==== Results summary ====
Overall								Home						Away					
Pld	W	D	L	GF	GA	GD	Pts	W	D	L	GF	GA	GD	W	D	L	GF	GA	GD
38	13	10	15	47	50	−3	49	6	5	8	26	27	−1	7	5	7	21	23	−2

Source: Soccerway

==== Results by round ====
Round	1	2	3	4	5	6	7	8	9	10	11	12	13	14	15	16	17	18	19	20	21	22	23	24	25	26	27	28	29	30	31	32	33	34	35	36	37	38
Ground	A	H	A	H	A	H	H	A	H	A	H	A	H	A	H	A	H	A	A	H	H	A	H	A	A	H	H	A	H	A	H	A	H	A	H	A	H	A
Result	L	W	W	D	L	D	W	L	L	D	W	W	L	W	W	L	L	D	W	L	D	W	D	D	W	L	L	W	W	L	W	D	L	L	D	D	L	L
Position	14	8	5	6	10	9	8	12	14	14	13	11	14	10	7	9	10	12	8	12	12	10	10	10	8	8	9	8	8	8	8	8	10	11	10	10	12	13
Points	0	3	6	7	7	8	11	11	11	12	15	18	18	21	24	24	24	25	28	28	29	32	33	34	37	37	37	40	43	43	46	47	47	47	48	49	49	49

Source: Premier League
A = Away; H = Home; W = Win; D = Draw; L = Loss; P = Postponed

==== Matches ====
On 18 June 2025, the Premier League fixtures were released, with Everton away to Leeds United on the opening weekend.

Win Draw Loss Fixtures

18 August 2025 1	Leeds United	1–0	Everton	Leeds
20:00 BST	Nmecha 84' (pen.)	Report	Iroegbunam (yellow card) 56'; Alcaraz (yellow card) 63'	Stadium: Elland Road; Attendance: 36,820; Referee: Chris Kavanagh
Note: Broadcast live on Sky Sports

24 August 2025 2	Everton	2–0	Brighton & Hove Albion	Liverpool
14:00 BST	Ndiaye 23'; Iroegbunam (yellow card) 39'; Garner 52', (yellow card) 63'; Beto (yellow card) 90+5'	Report	De Cuyper (yellow card) 28'; Wieffer (yellow card) 40'; Welbeck (penalty missed) 77'; Kadıoğlu (yellow card) 90+2'	Stadium: Hill Dickinson Stadium; Attendance: 51,759; Referee: Stuart Attwell
Note: Fixture was originally scheduled for 23 August, but was moved for live Sky Sports broadcasting.

30 August 2025 3	Wolverhampton Wanderers	2–3	Everton	Wolverhampton
15:00 BST	Hwang Hee-chan 21'; Gomes 79'	Report	Beto 7'; Dewsbury-Hall (yellow card) 16', (goal) 55'; Ndiaye 33'	Stadium: Molineux Stadium; Attendance: 30,271; Referee: Michael Oliver

13 September 2025 4	Everton	0–0	Aston Villa	Liverpool
15:00 BST	Iroegbunam (yellow card) 45+1'; Dewsbury-Hall (yellow card) 65'; Grealish (yellow card) 69'	Report	Cash (yellow card) 34'; Digne (yellow card) 57'; Buendía (yellow card) 70'	Stadium: Hill Dickinson Stadium; Attendance: 52,114; Referee: Simon Hooper

20 September 2025 5	Liverpool	2–1	Everton	Liverpool
12:30 BST	Gravenberch 10'; Ekitike 29'; Szoboszlai (yellow card) 69'; Wirtz (yellow card) 82'	Report	Ndiaye (yellow card) 28'; Gueye 58'; Dewsbury-Hall (yellow card) 78'; Grealish (yellow card) 90+4'	Stadium: Anfield; Attendance: 60,342; Referee: Darren England
Note: Fixture was originally scheduled for a 15:00 kick-off, but was moved for live TNT Sports broadcasting.

29 September 2025 6	Everton	1–1	West Ham United	Liverpool
20:00 BST	Keane 18'; Tarkowski (yellow card) 24'; Mykolenko (yellow card) 87'; Dewsbury-Hall (yellow card) 90'	Report	Walker-Peters (yellow card) 33'; Magassa (yellow card) 48'; Kilman (yellow card) 64'; Bowen 65'; Mavropanos (yellow card) 82'	Stadium: Hill Dickinson Stadium; Attendance: 51,890; Referee: Sam Barrott
Note: Fixture was originally scheduled for 27 September, but was moved for live Sky Sports broadcasting.

5 October 2025 7	Everton	2–1	Crystal Palace	Liverpool
14:00 BST	Garner (yellow card) 68'; Ndiaye 76' (pen.), (yellow card) 90+5'; Grealish 90+3'	Report	Muñoz 37', (yellow card) 87'; Pino (yellow card) 68'; Wharton (yellow card) 82'	Stadium: Hill Dickinson Stadium; Attendance: 51,770; Referee: Michael Salisbury
Note: Fixture was originally scheduled for 4 October, but was moved due to Crystal Palace's UEFA Conference League participation on the preceding Thursday.

18 October 2025 8	Manchester City	2–0	Everton	Manchester
15:00 BST	Haaland 58', 63'	Report	Garner (yellow card) 39'; Dibling (yellow card) 90+6'	Stadium: City of Manchester Stadium; Attendance: 52,498; Referee: Tony Harrington

26 October 2025 9	Everton	0–3	Tottenham Hotspur	Liverpool
16:30 GMT	Garner (yellow card) 58'; Grealish (yellow card) 71'	Report	Van de Ven 19', 45+6'; Sarr 89'	Stadium: Hill Dickinson Stadium; Attendance: 52,501; Referee: Craig Pawson
Note: Fixture was initially scheduled for 25 October, but was rescheduled for live Sky Sports broadcasting.

3 November 2025 10	Sunderland	1–1	Everton	Sunderland
20:00 GMT	Sadiki (yellow card) 17'; Mukiele (yellow card) 18'; Xhaka 46'; Hume (yellow card) 54'	Report	Ndiaye 15'; Barry (yellow card) 32'; Alcaraz (yellow card) 90+5'	Stadium: Stadium of Light; Attendance: 41,476; Referee: Thomas Bramall
Note: Fixture was initially scheduled for 1 November, but was rescheduled for live Sky Sports broadcasting.

8 November 2025 11	Everton	2–0	Fulham	Liverpool
15:00 GMT	Tarkowski (yellow card) 45+3'; Gueye 45+4'; Iroegbunam (yellow card) 63'; Keane 81'	Report	Lukić (yellow card) 10'; Bassey (yellow card) 45+3'	Stadium: Hill Dickinson Stadium; Attendance: 52,491; Referee: Andrew Madley

24 November 2025 12	Manchester United	0–1	Everton	Trafford
20:00 GMT	Mbeumo (yellow card) 45+2'; Casemiro (yellow card) 49'	Report	Gueye (red card) 13'; Dewsbury-Hall 29'	Stadium: Old Trafford; Attendance: 74,158; Referee: Tony Harrington
Note: Fixture was initially scheduled for 22 November, but was rescheduled for live Sky Sports broadcasting.

29 November 2025 13	Everton	1–4	Newcastle United	Liverpool
17:30 GMT	Dewsbury-Hall 69'	Report	Thiaw 1', 58'; Miley 25'; Woltemade 45'	Stadium: Hill Dickinson Stadium; Attendance: 52,244; Referee: Craig Pawson
Note: Fixture was initially scheduled for a 15:00 kick-off, but was rescheduled for live Sky Sports broadcasting.

2 December 2025 14	Bournemouth	0–1	Everton	Bournemouth
19:30 GMT	Kluivert (yellow card) 45'; Adams (yellow card) 53'; Ünal (yellow card) 89'	Report	Iroegbunam (yellow card) 22'; Mykolenko (yellow card) 49'; Grealish 78'; Alcaraz (yellow card) 79'	Stadium: Dean Court; Attendance: 11,161; Referee: Michael Salisbury
Note: Fixture was initially scheduled for 3 December, but was moved for live Sky Sports broadcasting.

6 December 2025 15	Everton	3–0	Nottingham Forest	Liverpool
15:00 GMT	Milenković 2' (o.g.); Barry 45+3', (yellow card) 57'; Tarkowski (yellow card) 73'; Dewsbury-Hall 80'; Mykolenko (yellow card) 84'; O'Brien (yellow card) 90+3'	Report	Savona (yellow card) 1'; Morato (yellow card) 45+3'; Milenković (yellow card) 54'	Stadium: Hill Dickinson Stadium; Attendance: 52,501; Referee: Chris Kavanagh

13 December 2025 16	Chelsea	2–0	Everton	Fulham
15:00 GMT	Palmer 21'; Gusto 45'; Fofana (yellow card) 76'	Report		Stadium: Stamford Bridge; Attendance: 39,552; Referee: Thomas Bramall

20 December 2025 17	Everton	0–1	Arsenal	Liverpool
20:00 GMT	Mykolenko (yellow card) 26'; Tarkowski (yellow card) 39'	Report	Gyökeres 27' (pen.), (yellow card) 56'; Martinelli (yellow card) 89'	Stadium: Hill Dickinson Stadium; Attendance: 52,513; Referee: Sam Barrott
Note: Fixture was initially scheduled for a 15:00 kick-off, but was rescheduled for live Sky Sports broadcasting.

27 December 2025 18	Burnley	0–0	Everton	Burnley
15:00 GMT		Report	Iroegbunam (yellow card) 80'; Dibling (yellow card) 86'	Stadium: Turf Moor; Attendance: 21,637; Referee: Craig Pawson

30 December 2025 19	Nottingham Forest	0–2	Everton	West Bridgford
19:30 GMT	Douglas Luiz (yellow card) 61'	Report	Garner 19'; Barry 79'	Stadium: City Ground; Attendance: 30,617; Referee: Michael Oliver
Note: Fixture was initially scheduled for a 20:00 kick-off, but was rescheduled for live Sky Sports broadcasting.

4 January 2026 20	Everton	2–4	Brentford	Liverpool
15:00 GMT	Beto 66'; Barry 90+1'	Report	Thiago 11', 51', 88'; Yarmolyuk (yellow card) 31'; Kayode (yellow card) 39'; Collins 50'	Stadium: Hill Dickinson Stadium; Attendance: 52,514; Referee: Anthony Taylor
Note: Fixture was initially scheduled for 3 January, but was rescheduled for live Sky Sports broadcasting.

7 January 2026 21	Everton	1–1	Wolverhampton Wanderers	Liverpool
19:30 GMT	Keane 17', (red card) 83'; Iroegbunam (yellow card) 77'; Grealish (yellow card) 87' (yellow-red card) 90'	Report	Sá (yellow card) 43'; Mosquera (yellow card) 57'; Mané 69'; Hwang Hee-chan (yellow card) 77'	Stadium: Hill Dickinson Stadium; Attendance: 51,768; Referee: Thomas Kirk
Note: Fixture was initially scheduled for a 20:00 kick-off, but was rescheduled for live Sky Sports broadcasting.

18 January 2026 22	Aston Villa	0–1	Everton	Birmingham
16:30 GMT	Bogarde (yellow card) 56'	Report	McNeil (yellow card) 23'; Garner (yellow card) 47'; Barry 59'	Stadium: Villa Park; Attendance: 43,059; Referee: Tony Harrington
Note: Fixture was initially scheduled for 17 January, but was rescheduled for live Sky Sports broadcasting.

26 January 2026 23	Everton	1–1	Leeds United	Liverpool
20:00 GMT	Barry 76'	Report	Justin 28'; Stach (yellow card) 54'; Gruev (yellow card) 56'; Buonanotte (yellow card) 90'	Stadium: Hill Dickinson Stadium; Attendance: 51,979; Referee: Simon Hooper
Note: Fixture was initially scheduled for 24 January, but was rescheduled for live Sky Sports broadcasting.

31 January 2026 24	Brighton & Hove Albion	1–1	Everton	Falmer
15:00 GMT	Groß (yellow card) 53', (goal) 73'	Report	Branthwaite (yellow card) 57'; Iroegbunam (yellow card) 90+2'; Beto 90+7'	Stadium: Falmer Stadium; Attendance: 31,419; Referee: Chris Kavanagh

7 February 2026 25	Fulham	1–2	Everton	Fulham
15:00 GMT	Mykolenko 18' (o.g.); Cuenca (yellow card) 66'	Report	Gueye (yellow card) 18'; Garner (yellow card) 56'; Mykolenko (yellow card) 65'; Dewsbury-Hall 75'; Leno 83' (o.g.); O'Brien (yellow card) 88'; Pickford (yellow card) 90+7'	Stadium: Craven Cottage; Attendance: 27,155; Referee: Stuart Attwell

10 February 2025 26	Everton	1–2	Bournemouth	Liverpool
19:30 GMT	Ndiaye 42' (pen.); Beto (yellow card) 66'; O'Brien (red card) 69'	Report	Rayan (yellow card) 57', (goal) 61'; Adli 64'; Brooks (yellow card) 81'; Jiménez (yellow card) 90+6'	Stadium: Hill Dickinson Stadium; Attendance: 50,196; Referee: Andrew Madley
Note: Fixture was initially scheduled for 11 February, but was rescheduled for live TNT Sports broadcasting.

23 February 2026 27	Everton	0–1	Manchester United	Liverpool
20:00 GMT	Pickford (yellow card) 77'; Tarkowski (yellow card) 83'	Report	Šeško 71'; Maguire (yellow card) 84'; Mazraoui (yellow card) 90+2'; Fernandes (yellow card) 90+5'	Stadium: Hill Dickinson Stadium; Attendance: 52,326; Referee: Darren England
Note: Fixture was initially scheduled for 21 February, but was rescheduled for live Sky Sports broadcasting.

28 February 2026 28	Newcastle United	2–3	Everton	Newcastle upon Tyne
15:00 GMT	Ramsey 32'; Willock (yellow card) 61'; J. Murphy 82'; Burn (yellow card) 88'; Hall (yellow card) 90+5'	Report	Branthwaite 19'; Beto 34'; Dewsbury-Hall (yellow card) 53'; Garner (yellow card) 67'; Barry 83', (yellow card) 90+5'	Stadium: St James' Park; Attendance: 52,514; Referee: Stuart Attwell

3 March 2026 29	Everton	2–0	Burnley	Liverpool
19:30 GMT	Tarkowski 32'; Dewsbury-Hall 60'	Report	Humphreys (yellow card) 64'	Stadium: Hill Dickinson Stadium; Attendance: 51,959; Referee: Tim Robinson
Note: Fixture was initially scheduled for 4 March, but was rescheduled for live TNT Sports broadcasting.

14 March 2026 30	Arsenal	2–0	Everton	Holloway
17:30 GMT	Gyökeres 89'; Dowman 90+7'	Report		Stadium: Emirates Stadium; Attendance: 60,176; Referee: Andrew Madley
Note: Fixture was initially scheduled for 14 March, but was rescheduled for live Sky Sports broadcasting. It was then reverted to the original date but with a 17:30 kick-off, due to Arsenal's UEFA Champions League participation on the following Tuesday.

21 March 2026 31	Everton	3–0	Chelsea	Liverpool
17:30 GMT	Beto 33', 62'; Ndiaye 76'	Report	Garnacho (yellow card) 69'; Fofana (yellow card) 87'	Stadium: Hill Dickinson Stadium; Attendance: 52,547; Referee: Sam Barrott
Note: Fixture was initially scheduled for a 15:00 kick-off, but was rescheduled for live Sky Sports broadcasting.

11 April 2026 32	Brentford	2–2	Everton	Brentford
15:00 BST	Thiago 3' (pen.), 77'	Report	Pickford (yellow card) 2'; Beto 26'; Garner (yellow card) 47'; Dewsbury-Hall 90+1'	Stadium: Brentford Community Stadium; Attendance: 17,220; Referee: Farai Hallam

19 April 2026 33	Everton	1–2	Liverpool	Liverpool
14:00 BST	Pickford (yellow card) 22'; Beto 54'; Garner (yellow card) 90+12'	Report	Salah 29'; Van Dijk 90+10'	Stadium: Hill Dickinson Stadium; Attendance: 52,585; Referee: Chris Kavanagh
Note: Fixture was initially scheduled for 18 April, but was rescheduled for live Sky Sports broadcasting.

25 April 2026 34	West Ham United	2–1	Everton	Stratford
15:00 BST	Souček 51'; Castellanos (yellow card) 70'; Wilson 90+2', (yellow card) 90+5'; Disasi (yellow card) 90+3'	Report	O'Brien (yellow card) 38'; Tarkowski (yellow card) 47'; Garner (yellow card) 63'; Dewsbury-Hall 88'; Alcaraz (yellow card) 90+9'	Stadium: London Stadium; Attendance: 62,454; Referee: Stuart Attwell

4 May 2026 35	Everton	3–3	Manchester City	Liverpool
20:00 BST	Keane (yellow card) 45'; Beto (yellow card) 48'; Tarkowski (yellow card) 53'; Barry 68', 81'; O'Brien 73', (yellow card) 86'	Report	Doku 43', 90+7'; Donnarumma (yellow card) 73'; Haaland 83'	Stadium: Hill Dickinson Stadium; Attendance: 52,257; Referee: Michael Oliver
Note: Fixture was initially scheduled for 2 May, but was pushed back two-days for live Sky Sports broadcasting.

10 May 2026 36	Crystal Palace	2–2	Everton	Selhurst
14:00 BST	Sarr 34'; Mateta 77'	Report	Tarkowski 6'; Garner (yellow card) 30'; Mykolenko (yellow card) 45'; Beto 47'	Stadium: Selhurst Park; Attendance: 24,958; Referee: Thomas Bramall
Note: Fixture was initially scheduled for 9 May, but was pushed back a day due to Crystal Palace's UEFA Conference League participation on the preceding Thursday.

17 May 2026 37	Everton	1–3	Sunderland	Liverpool
15:00 BST	Iroegbunam (yellow card) 25'; Röhl 43'; O'Brien (yellow card) 47'; Garner (yellow card) 90+6'	Report	Brobbey 59'; Le Fée 81'; Isidor 90+1'	Stadium: Hill Dickinson Stadium; Attendance: 52,590; Referee: John Brooks

24 May 2026 38	Tottenham Hotspur	1–0	Everton	Tottenham
16:00 BST	Palhinha 43', (yellow card) 87'; Sarr (yellow card) 80'; Kinský (yellow card) 90+7'	Report	O'Brien (yellow card) 13'; Tarkowski (yellow card) 89'	Stadium: Tottenham Hotspur Stadium; Attendance: 61,876; Referee: Michael Oliver

=== FA Cup ===
Everton were drawn at home to Sunderland in the third round.

Win Draw Loss Fixtures

10 January 2026 Third round	Everton	1–1 (a.e.t.) (0–3 p)	Sunderland	Liverpool
12:15 GMT	Garner 89' (pen.); Barry (yellow card) 90+2'	Report	Le Fée 30'; Sadiki (yellow card) 45+1'; Xhaka (yellow card) 88'; Ballard (yellow card) 90+1'; Mukiele (yellow card) 109'; Hume (yellow card) 115'	Stadium: Hill Dickinson Stadium; Attendance: 51,588; Referee: John Brooks
	Penalties
	Garner (penalty missed); Barry (penalty missed); Beto (penalty missed)		(penalty scored) Le Fée; (penalty scored) Xhaka; (penalty scored) O'Nien

=== EFL Cup ===
Everton were drawn at home to Mansfield Town in the second round. They were then drawn away to Wolverhampton Wanderers in the third round.

Win Draw Loss Fixtures

27 August 2025 Second round	Everton	2–0	Mansfield Town	Liverpool
19:45 BST	Alcaraz 51'; Beto 89'	Report		Stadium: Hill Dickinson Stadium; Attendance: 48,583; Referee: Thomas Bramall

23 September 2025 Third round	Wolverhampton Wanderers	2–0	Everton	Wolverhampton
19:45 BST	Munetsi 29'; S. Bueno (yellow card) 71'; Arokodare 87'; João Gomes (yellow card) 90+3'	Report	Barry (yellow card) 32'; Garner (yellow card) 90+1'	Stadium: Molineux Stadium; Attendance: 18,758; Referee: Craig Pawson

== Statistics ==
=== Appearances and goals ===
As of match played 24 May 2026

Players with no appearances are not included on the list, italics indicate a loaned in player

No.	Pos	Nat	Player	Total		Premier League		FA Cup		EFL Cup	
No.	Pos	Nat	Player	Apps	Goals	Apps	Goals	Apps	Goals	Apps	Goals
1	GK	(England) ENG	Jordan Pickford	39	0	38	0	1	0	0	0
2	DF	(Scotland) SCO	Nathan Patterson	8	0	3+4	0	1	0	0	0
5	DF	(England) ENG	Michael Keane	35	3	29+4	3	0	0	2	0
6	DF	(England) ENG	James Tarkowski	40	2	37	2	1	0	2	0
7	FW	(England) ENG	Dwight McNeil	25	0	14+8	0	1	0	2	0
9	FW	(Guinea-Bissau) GBS	Beto	40	10	17+20	9	1	0	0+2	1
10	FW	(Senegal) SEN	Iliman Ndiaye	34	6	32	6	0	0	0+2	0
11	FW	(France) FRA	Thierno Barry	41	8	21+17	8	0+1	0	2	0
12	GK	(Republic of Ireland) IRL	Mark Travers	2	0	0	0	0	0	2	0
15	DF	(Republic of Ireland) IRL	Jake O'Brien	40	1	35+2	1	1	0	1+1	0
16	DF	(Ukraine) UKR	Vitaliy Mykolenko	36	0	33	0	1	0	1+1	0
18	FW	(England) ENG	Jack Grealish	22	2	18+2	2	0	0	1+1	0
19	FW	(England) ENG	Tyrique George	11	0	1+10	0	0	0	0	0
20	FW	(England) ENG	Tyler Dibling	17	0	4+10	0	1	0	1+1	0
22	MF	(England) ENG	Kiernan Dewsbury-Hall	32	8	30+1	8	0	0	0+1	0
23	DF	(Republic of Ireland) IRL	Séamus Coleman	7	0	1+4	0	0	0	2	0
24	MF	(Argentina) ARG	Charly Alcaraz	22	1	6+14	0	0	0	2	1
27	MF	(Senegal) SEN	Idrissa Gueye	25	2	25+0	2	0	0	0	0
32	DF	(England) ENG	Jarrad Branthwaite	10	1	7+3	1	0	0	0	0
34	MF	(Germany) GER	Merlin Röhl	17	1	6+10	1	1	0	0	0
37	MF	(England) ENG	James Garner	41	3	38	2	1	1	2	0
39	DF	(Morocco) MAR	Adam Aznou	1	0	0	0	0+1	0	0	0
42	MF	(England) ENG	Tim Iroegbunam	31	0	17+12	0	0	0	1+1	0
45	MF	(England) ENG	Harrison Armstrong	15	0	6+7	0	1	0	1	0
64	DF	(England) ENG	Reece Welch	1	0	0	0	0+1	0	0	0
Player who featured but departed the club on loan during the season:
73	DF	(England) ENG	Elijah Campbell	1	0	0	0	0+1	0	0	0

=== Discipline ===
As of match played 24 May 2026

Rank	No.	Pos.	Player	Premier League			FA Cup			EFL Cup			Total		
Rank	No.	Pos.	Player	Yellow card	(yellow card) (yellow-red card)	Red card	Yellow card	(yellow card) (yellow-red card)	Red card	Yellow card	(yellow card) (yellow-red card)	Red card	Yellow card	(yellow card) (yellow-red card)	Red card
1	37	MF	(England) James Garner	12	0	0	0	0	0	1	0	0	13	0	0
2	42	MF	(England) Tim Iroegbunam	9	0	0	0	0	0	0	0	0	9	0	0
3	6	DF	(England) James Tarkowski	8	0	0	0	0	0	0	0	0	8	0	0
4	15	DF	(Republic of Ireland) Jake O'Brien	6	0	1	0	0	0	0	0	0	6	0	1
5	16	DF	(Ukraine) Vitaliy Mykolenko	6	0	0	0	0	0	0	0	0	6	0	0
5	22	MF	(England) Kiernan Dewsbury-Hall	6	0	0	0	0	0	0	0	0	6	0	0
7	11	FW	(France) Thierno Barry	3	0	0	1	0	0	1	0	0	5	0	0
8	1	GK	(England) Jordan Pickford	4	0	0	0	0	0	0	0	0	4	0	0
8	24	MF	(Argentina) Charly Alcaraz	4	0	0	0	0	0	0	0	0	4	0	0
10	18	FW	(England) Jack Grealish	2	1	0	0	0	0	0	0	0	2	1	0
11	9	FW	(Guinea-Bissau) Beto	3	0	0	0	0	0	0	0	0	3	0	0
12	5	DF	(England) Michael Keane	1	0	1	0	0	0	0	0	0	1	0	1
12	27	MF	(Senegal) Idrissa Gueye	1	0	1	0	0	0	0	0	0	1	0	1
14	10	FW	(Senegal) Iliman Ndiaye	2	0	0	0	0	0	0	0	0	2	0	0
14	20	FW	(England) Tyler Dibling	2	0	0	0	0	0	0	0	0	2	0	0
16	7	MF	(England) Dwight McNeil	1	0	0	0	0	0	0	0	0	1	0	0
16	32	DF	(England) Jarrad Branthwaite	1	0	0	0	0	0	0	0	0	1	0	0
Total				69	1	3	1	0	0	2	0	0	72	1	3
