= Beto (footballer, born 1998) =

Footballer (born 1998)

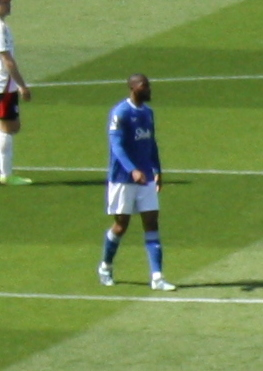
- Beto with Everton in 2025

Personal information
- Full name: Norberto Bercique Gomes Betuncal
- Date of birth: 31 January 1998 (age 28)
- Place of birth: Lisbon, Portugal
- Height: 1.94 m (6 ft 4 in)
- Position: Striker

Team information
- Current team: Fiorentina
- Number: 23

Youth career
- 2007–2011: União Tires
- 2011–2012: Benfica
- 2012–2013: União Tires
- 2013–2014: Oeiras
- 2014–2015: União Tires

Senior career*
Years	Team	Apps	(Gls)
2015–2018	União Tires	25	(4)
2018–2019	Olímpico Montijo	34	(21)
2019–2022	Portimonense	44	(13)
2021–2022	→ Udinese (loan)	28	(11)
2022–2023	Udinese	34	(10)
2023–2026	Everton	99	(20)
2026–	Fiorentina	9	(0)

International career^{‡}
2024–	Guinea-Bissau	12	(1)
- * Club domestic league appearances and goals as of 21:43, 8 November 2026 (UTC) ‡ National team caps and goals as of 23:09, 29 September 2026 (UTC)

Norberto Bercique Gomes Betuncal (born 31 January 1998), known as Beto, is a professional footballer who plays as a striker for Serie A club Fiorentina. Born in Portugal, he represents Guinea-Bissau at international level.

== Club career ==
=== Early years ===
Born in Lisbon of Bissau-Guinean descent, Beto started his senior career with amateurs União de Tires in the Lisbon Football Association, while working at KFC. In 2018 he signed with Olímpico do Montijo of the third division, finishing second in the scoring charts in his only season with 21 goals.

=== Portimonense ===
Beto moved straight to the Primeira Liga on 3 June 2019, joining Portimonense on a four-year contract. He made his debut in the competition on 9 August, coming on as an 87th-minute substitute in a 0–0 home draw against B-SAD. He finished the campaign with a further ten league appearances, all from the bench.

Beto scored his first goal in the Portuguese top division on 8 November 2020, but in a 3–1 away loss to Porto. He added ten more during the season, best in the squad.

=== Udinese ===
On the last day of the 2021 summer transfer window, Beto was transferred to Italian club Udinese on a season-long loan with an obligation to buy. He scored four times in his first ten Serie A appearances, helping his team earn six points in the process.

Beto scored a hat-trick in a 5–1 home win over Cagliari on 3 April 2022.

=== Everton ===
On 29 August 2023, Beto joined Premier League club Everton on a four-year deal for a reported fee of around £25.8 million (€30 million). The following day, he made his debut and scored his first goal for the Toffees in a 2–1 victory at Doncaster Rovers in the second round of the EFL Cup. His league bow took place on 2 September, when he featured the entire 2–2 draw away to Sheffield United.

Beto scored his first goal in the league on 7 December 2023, closing the 3–0 win over Newcastle United at Goodison Park after playing the last minutes in place of Dominic Calvert-Lewin. Twelve days later, he equalised 1–1 against Fulham in the League Cup quarter-finals and later converted his penalty shootout attempt, but the opposition advanced with a 7–6 victory.

As Calvert-Lewin was sidelined with a thigh injury, Beto enjoyed a run in the team as starter and made the most of it. On 12 February 2025, he put Everton ahead 1–0 in the 11th minute of the Merseyside derby against Liverpool, in an eventual 2–2 home draw.

On 21 March 2026, Beto scored twice in a 3–0 home defeat of Chelsea, also providing an assist for Iliman Ndiaye. During his spell, he netted 25 times in 113 competitive games.

=== Fiorentina ===
Beto returned to the Italian top division on 1 September 2026, on a contract at Fiorentina for an undisclosed fee reported to be €18 million. He made his debut four days later, as a substitute in the 2–1 home loss against Torino.

== International career ==
In October 2022, Beto was named in a preliminary Portugal 55-man squad for the 2022 FIFA World Cup in Qatar. Two years later, he accepted an offer from Guinea-Bissau manager Luís Boa Morte to represent their national team. He won his first cap on 11 October, in a 1–0 away loss to Mali for the 2025 Africa Cup of Nations qualifiers. He scored his first goal on 19 November, equalising an eventual 2–1 home defeat against Mozambique in the same stage.

== Personal life ==
Beto idolised Cameroon striker Samuel Eto'o as a child, and signed his name as "Beto'o". He named Beethoven's Ninth as his music to listen to before training.

== Career statistics ==
=== Club ===
As of match played 8 November 2026

Appearances and goals by club, season and competition
Club	Season	League			National cup (Note: Includes Taça de Portugal, Coppa Italia, FA Cup)		League cup (Note: Includes Taça da Liga, EFL Cup)		Total	
Club	Season	Division	Apps	Goals	Apps	Goals	Apps	Goals	Apps	Goals
União Tires	2015–16	Lisbon Football Association	6	1	—		—		6	1
União Tires	2016–17	Lisbon Football Association	0	0	—		—		0	0
União Tires	2017–18	Lisbon Football Association	19	3	—		—		19	3
Olímpico Montijo	2018–19	Campeonato de Portugal	34	21	2	0	—		36	21
Portimonense	2019–20	Primeira Liga	11	0	0	0	0	0	11	0
Portimonense	2020–21	Primeira Liga	30	11	1	0	—		31	11
Portimonense	2021–22	Primeira Liga	3	2	0	0	2	0	5	2
Portimonense	Total		44	13	1	0	2	0	47	13
Udinese (loan)	2021–22	Serie A	28	11	1	0	—		29	11
Udinese	2022–23	Serie A	33	10	1	0	—		34	10
Udinese	2023–24	Serie A	1	0	1	1	—		2	1
Udinese	Total		62	21	3	1	—		65	22
Everton	2023–24	Premier League	30	3	3	0	4	2	37	5
Everton	2024–25	Premier League	30	8	2	1	2	1	34	10
Everton	2025–26	Premier League	37	9	1	0	2	1	40	10
Everton	2026–27	Premier League	2	0	—		0	0	2	0
Everton	Total		99	20	6	1	8	4	113	25
Fiorentina	2026–27	Serie A	9	0	1	0	—		10	0
Career total			273	79	13	2	10	4	296	85

=== International ===
As of match played 29 September 2026

Appearances and goals by national team and year
National team	Year	Apps	Goals
Guinea-Bissau	2024	4	1
Guinea-Bissau	2025	6	0
Guinea-Bissau	2026	2	0
Total		12	1

Scores and results list Guinea-Bissau's goal tally first.

List of international goals scored by Beto
No.	Date	Venue	Opponent	Score	Result	Competition
1	19 November 2024	Estádio 24 de Setembro, Bissau, Guinea-Bissau	Mozambique	1–1	1–2	2025 Africa Cup of Nations qualification

== Honours ==
Individual

- Primeira Liga Goal of the Season: 2020–21
