= Tim Iroegbunam =

English footballer (born 2003)

- Iroegbunam in 2026

Personal information
- Full name: Timothy Emeka Iroegbunam
- Date of birth: 30 June 2003 (age 23)
- Place of birth: Great Barr, England
- Height: 6 ft 0 in (1.83 m)
- Position: Defensive midfielder

Team information
- Current team: Hull City
- Number: 42

Youth career
- Sutton United
- 2009–2021: West Bromwich Albion
- 2021–2022: Aston Villa

Senior career*
Years	Team	Apps	(Gls)
2022–2024	Aston Villa	12	(0)
2022–2023	→ Queens Park Rangers (loan)	32	(2)
2024–2026	Everton	48	(0)
2026–	Hull City	6	(1)

International career
2022	England U19	6	(0)
2022–2024	England U20	7	(1)
Medal record
Men's football
Representing England
UEFA European Under-19 Championship
Winner	2022 Slovakia
- * Club domestic league appearances and goals as of 22:11, 31 October 2026 (UTC)

Timothy Emeka Iroegbunam (pronounced /ɪrəˈbuːnəm/, irr-ə-BOO-nəm; born 30 June 2003) is an English footballer who plays as a defensive midfielder for Premier League club Hull City.

Iroegbunam is a product of the West Bromwich Albion and Aston Villa academies. He spent the 2022–23 season on loan from Aston Villa at EFL Championship side Queens Park Rangers, and also appeared for England at under-19 and under-20 levels, winning the UEFA European Under-19 Championship with the former in 2022. Having made his professional debut at Aston Villa in February 2022, he signed for Everton in June 2024. On 1 September 2026 he signed for Hull City.

== Club career ==
=== Youth career ===
Iroegbunam played youth football in Sutton Coldfield for Sutton United where, at under-8s level, he played alongside future teammate Louie Barry. Iroegbunam started his career at West Bromwich Albion, appearing once on the bench for a Premier League game against Leeds United on 23 May 2021.

=== Aston Villa ===
Iroegbunam signed for Aston Villa in an undisclosed deal in July 2021, joining their under-23 academy side. After featuring on the bench several times, Iroegbunam made his Premier League debut on 26 February 2022, as a late substitute for Philippe Coutinho in a 2–0 away victory over Brighton & Hove Albion. He signed a contract extension in March 2022, running until 2027. On 30 April 2022, Irogebunam was given his first Premier League start for Aston Villa, in a 2–0 victory over Norwich City playing 73 minutes before being substituted for Douglas Luiz.

In September 2022, Iroegbunam signed for Championship club Queens Park Rangers on a season-long loan deal. He made his EFL debut on 3 September, in a 1–0 defeat to Swansea City. He scored his first goal in senior football on 25 February 2023, QPR's only goal in a 3–1 defeat to Blackburn Rovers.

=== Everton ===
In June 2024, Iroegbunam joined fellow Premier League club Everton for an undisclosed fee, reported to be around £9m, signing a three-year deal. He made his debut for the Toffees during the opening game of the Premier League season, a 3-0 home loss to Brighton & Hove Albion on 17 August 2024.

=== Hull City ===
On 1 September 2026, Iroegbunam joined newly promoted Premier League side Hull City for an undisclosed fee, reported an initial £13m, which could rise to £22m with add-ons, signing a 5-year contract. On 31 October 2026, he scored his first goal for the club in a home draw with Ipswich Town.

== International career ==
Iroegbunam was given his first international call-up when he was named in the England under-20 team for the matches against Poland and Germany in March 2022. In the same international break, Iroegbunam was included in the England U19 team and made his international debut on 23 March 2022, in a 3–1 UEFA European Under-19 Championship qualification win over Republic of Ireland.

He was named in the England squad for the 2022 UEFA European Under-19 Championship finals and featured heavily in the tournament. In the final, Iroegbunam appeared as a second-half substitute as England beat Israel 3–1 in extra time.

Iroegbunam made his England U20 debut as a substitute during a 3–0 victory over Chile at the Pinatar Arena on 21 September 2022.

== Personal life ==
Born in England, Iroegbunam is of Igbo Nigerian descent. He is the child of deaf adults and speaks British Sign Language.

== Career statistics ==
As of match played 31 October 2026

Appearances and goals by club, season and competition
Club	Season	League			FA Cup		EFL Cup		Europe		Other		Total	
Club	Season	Division	Apps	Goals	Apps	Goals	Apps	Goals	Apps	Goals	Apps	Goals	Apps	Goals
West Bromwich Albion U23	2020–21	—			—		—		—		1 (Note: Appearance(s) in EFL Trophy)	0	1	0
Aston Villa U21	2021–22	—			—		—		—		4	0	4	0
Aston Villa U21	2023–24	—			—		—		—		1	0	1	0
Aston Villa U21	Total		—		—		—		—		5	0	5	0
Aston Villa	2021–22	Premier League	3	0	0	0	0	0	—		—		3	0
Aston Villa	2022–23	Premier League	0	0	—		1	0	—		—		1	0
Aston Villa	2023–24	Premier League	9	0	1	0	0	0	5 (Note: Appearances in UEFA Europa Conference League)	0	—		15	0
Aston Villa	Total		12	0	1	0	1	0	5	0	—		19	0
Queens Park Rangers (loan)	2022–23	Championship	32	2	0	0	—		—		—		32	2
Everton	2024–25	Premier League	18	0	1	0	2	0	—		—		21	0
Everton	2025–26	Premier League	29	0	0	0	2	0	—		—		31	0
Everton	2026–27	Premier League	1	0	—		0	0	—		—		1	0
Everton	Total		48	0	1	0	4	0	—		—		53	0
Hull City	2026–27	Premier League	6	1	0	0	0	0	—		—		6	1
Career total			98	3	2	0	5	0	5	0	6	0	116	3

== Honours ==
England U19

- UEFA European Under-19 Championship: 2022
