= Charly Alcaraz =

Argentine footballer (born 2002)

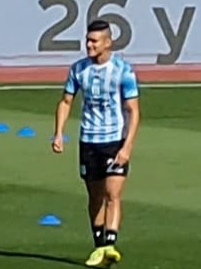
- Alcaraz with Racing Club in 2022

Personal information
- Full name: Carlos Jonas Alcaraz Durán
- Date of birth: 30 November 2002 (age 23)
- Place of birth: La Plata, Argentina
- Height: 1.83 m (6 ft 0 in)
- Position: Attacking midfielder

Team information
- Current team: Everton
- Number: 24

Youth career
- 2012–2017: Deportes Infantiles de Villa Elisa
- 2017–2020: Racing Club

Senior career*
Years	Team	Apps	(Gls)
2020–2023	Racing Club	38	(4)
2023–2024	Southampton	42	(7)
2024	→ Juventus (loan)	10	(0)
2024–2025	Flamengo	15	(3)
2025	→ Everton (loan)	15	(2)
2025–	Everton	25	(0)

International career
2023	Argentina U23	2	(0)
- * Club domestic league appearances and goals as of 22:42, 6 November 2026 (UTC)

Carlos Jonas "Charly" Alcaraz Durán (born 30 November 2002) is an Argentine professional footballer who plays as an attacking midfielder for Premier League club Everton.

== Club career ==
=== Racing Club ===
Alcaraz played for Deportes Infantiles de Villa Elisa, before joining the youth academy of Racing Club in 2017. Alcaraz made his professional debut with Racing Club in a 1–1 Argentine Primera División tie with Atlético Tucumán on 26 January 2020.

He scored the winning goal of the 2022 Trofeo de Campeones Final against Boca Juniors in extra-time, sparking a large melee, and being one of many players to be sent off.

=== Southampton ===
In January 2023, he signed a four-and-a-half-year contract for Premier League side Southampton. According to several media, Alcaraz was sold for £12m, and Racing Club also secured 15% of a potential future sale. On 14 January, Alcaraz made his Premier League debut in a 2–1 away victory against Everton, replacing Roméo Lavia in the 61st minute. On 11 February, he scored his first goal for the club in a Premier League match against Wolves, scoring the opener in the 24th minute of a 2–1 home defeat.

On 6 October 2023, Alcaraz signed a new five-year contract.

==== Juventus (loan) ====
On 31 January 2024, Alcaraz joined Serie A side Juventus on loan for the remainder of the 2023–24 season. The loan deal included an optional buy-clause of €49.5 million. He made his first appearance for the club on 4 February 2024 in a 1–0 defeat against Inter Milan, replacing Weston McKennie in the 90th minute.

=== Flamengo ===
On 28 August 2024, Alcaraz signed a contract until August 2029 with Campeonato Brasileiro Série A club Flamengo. The Brazilian club agreed to pay an €18 million fee, becoming the biggest transfer in the club's history.

=== Everton ===
On 31 January 2025, Flamengo announced that they had reached an agreement for Alcaraz to join Premier League side Everton for the remainder of the 2024–25 season. Alcaraz was announced as an Everton signing on 4 February on loan, with an option to buy at the end of the season. On 15 February, he made his first league start for Everton against Crystal Palace in a 2–1 win. He managed to get an assist and the winning goal in the 80th minute.

On 31 May 2025, Everton announced they would be signing Alcaraz on a permanent basis.

== International career ==
On 5 October 2023, Alcaraz was called up to the Argentina squad for the first time ahead of their World Cup qualifiers against Paraguay and Peru.

== Career statistics ==
=== Club ===
As of match played 29 October 2026

Appearances and goals by club, season and competition
Club	Season	League			State league (Note: Includes Campeonato Carioca)		National cup (Note: Includes Copa Argentina, FA Cup, Coppa Italia, Copa do Brasil)		League cup (Note: Includes Copa de la Liga Profesional, EFL Cup)		Continental		Other		Total	
Club	Season	Division	Apps	Goals	Apps	Goals	Apps	Goals	Apps	Goals	Apps	Goals	Apps	Goals	Apps	Goals
Racing Club	2019–20	Argentine Primera División	1	0	—		0	0	8	1	5 (Note: Appearance(s) in Copa Libertadores)	0	1 (Note: Appearance in Copa de la Superliga)	1	15	2
Racing Club	2021	Argentine Primera División	18	1	—		1	0	6	0	1	0	—		26	1
Racing Club	2022	Argentine Primera División	19	3	—		1	0	14	4	6 (Note: Appearances in Copa Sudamericana)	1	2 (Note: Appearances in Trofeo de Campeones de la Liga Profesional)	1	42	9
Racing Club	Total		38	4	—		2	0	28	5	12	1	3	2	83	12
Southampton	2022–23	Premier League	18	4	—		1	0	2	0	—		—		21	4
Southampton	2023–24	Championship	23	3	—		2	0	1	1	—		—		26	4
Southampton	2024–25	Premier League	1	0	—		—		—		—		—		1	0
Southampton	Total		42	7	—		3	0	3	1	—		—		48	8
Juventus (loan)	2023–24	Serie A	10	0	—		2	0	—		—		—		12	0
Flamengo	2024	Série A	14	2	—		3	0	—		1	0	—		18	2
Flamengo	2025	Série A	0	0	1	1	—		—		—		—		1	1
Flamengo	Total		14	2	1	1	3	0	—		1	0	—		19	3
Everton (loan)	2024–25	Premier League	15	2	—		1	0	—		—		—		16	2
Everton	2025–26	Premier League	20	0	—		0	0	2	1	—		—		22	1
Everton	2026–27	Premier League	4	0	—		0	0	3	1	—		—		7	1
Everton	Everton total		39	2	—		1	0	5	2	—		—		45	4
Career total			144	15	1	1	11	0	36	8	13	1	3	2	208	27

== Honours ==
Racing Club

- Trofeo de Campeones de la Liga Profesional: 2022

Juventus

- Coppa Italia: 2023–24

Flamengo

- Copa do Brasil: 2024
- Campeonato Carioca: 2025
