= James Garner (footballer, born 2001) =

English footballer (born 2001)

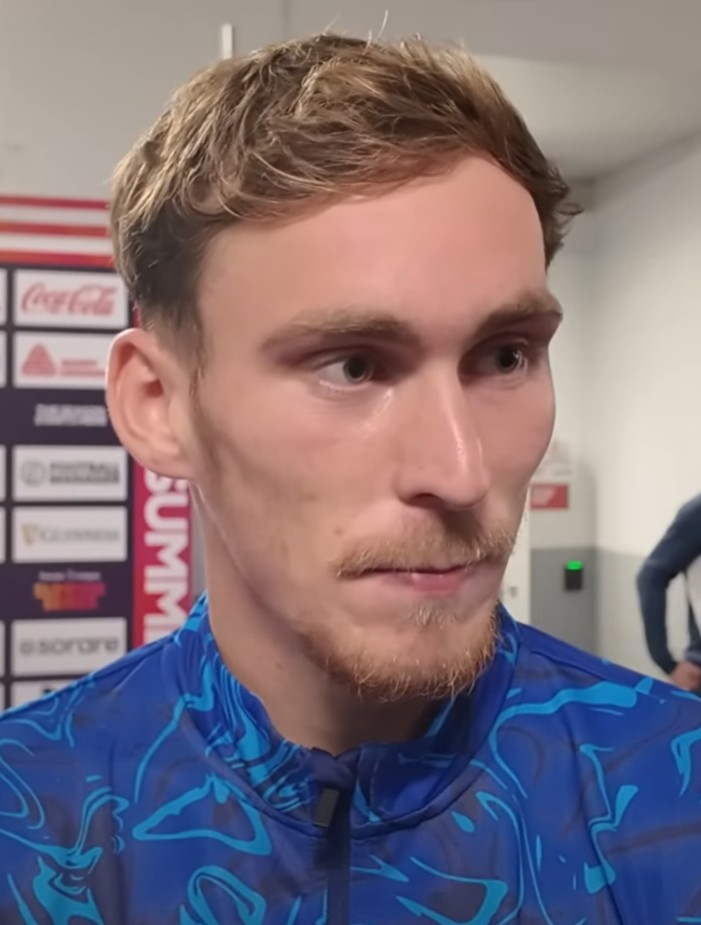
- Garner with Everton in 2025

Personal information
- Full name: James David Garner
- Date of birth: 13 March 2001 (age 25)
- Place of birth: Birkenhead, Merseyside, England
- Height: 1.82 m (6 ft 0 in)
- Position: Central midfielder

Team information
- Current team: Everton
- Number: 37

Youth career
- 2009–2018: Manchester United

Senior career*
Years	Team	Apps	(Gls)
2018–2022	Manchester United	2	(0)
2020–2021	→ Watford (loan)	20	(0)
2021–2022	→ Nottingham Forest (loan)	61	(8)
2022–	Everton	122	(3)

International career^{‡}
2018	England U17	7	(0)
2018–2019	England U18	7	(0)
2019	England U19	5	(3)
2020	England U20	1	(0)
2021–2023	England U21	18	(0)
2026–	England	6	(0)
Medal record
Representing England
UEFA European Under-21 Championship
Winner	2023 Georgia–Romania
- * Club domestic league appearances and goals as of 22:47, 6 November 2026 (UTC) ‡ National team caps and goals as of 21:53, 12 November 2026 (UTC)

James David Garner (born 13 March 2001) is an English professional footballer who plays as a central midfielder for Premier League club Everton and the England national team.

Born in Birkenhead, Garner joined Manchester United's youth system at under-8 level. He made his first-team debut at the age of 17, in a Premier League game against Crystal Palace in February 2019. He spent time on loan at Watford and Nottingham Forest. In the 2021–22 season, he helped Forest gain promotion to the Premier League by winning the play-offs. Garner made seven first-team appearances for United in total, before joining Everton in September 2022.

Garner made over 30 appearances for England's youth national teams, from under-17 to under-21 level. He made his debut for the under-21 team in September 2021, and was part of the squad that won the 2023 UEFA European Under-21 Championship.

== Club career ==
=== Manchester United ===
==== Youth career ====
Garner was born in Birkenhead in Merseyside. He joined the Manchester United Academy at under-8 level. He initially played as a centre-back until the age of 15, before transitioning into midfield. Garner made his first appearances for the Manchester United Under-18s at the end of the 2016–17 season, appearing as a substitute in games against Arsenal and Blackburn Rovers. He signed as an academy scholar in July 2017 and played for the Under-18s in 2017–18, scoring four goals in 24 appearances in all competitions as Manchester United won the Premier League North title; however, he missed the final of the competition against Chelsea as he was on international duty. He also made eight appearances for the Manchester United Under-19s as they made it to the round of 16 of the 2017–18 UEFA Youth League before being eliminated by local rivals Liverpool.

==== 2018–19 season ====
Garner first became involved with the Manchester United first team on the club's summer 2018 tour of the United States, starting in the match against San Jose Earthquakes on 22 July, before being replaced by Scott McTominay at half-time. He made substitute appearances against Real Madrid on 1 August and Bayern Munich on 5 August. With Manchester United's qualification from their 2018–19 UEFA Champions League group secure, Garner was named on the bench for their final group game against Valencia on 12 December, but was not used in the match. He was named as a substitute for Manchester United's 2018–19 FA Cup third round tie against Reading on 5 January 2019, but, again, was not brought on.

On 27 February 2019, he made his first-team debut at the age of 17, coming on as a 90th-minute substitute for Fred in a 3–1 league win away to Crystal Palace. On 15 March, Garner signed a contract extension, keeping him at United until June 2022 with an option for a further year.

==== 2019–20 season ====
Garner went on the first team's summer tour in 2019, along with fellow academy players Angel Gomes, Tahith Chong and Mason Greenwood. He came on as a substitute in the 83rd minute of the first pre-season game against Perth Glory, and scored his first senior goal, a low drive into the bottom right corner from outside the box.

On 24 October 2019, he made his European debut for Manchester United against Partizan in the Europa League.

==== Loans ====
Garner signed a season-long loan deal with EFL Championship team Watford in September 2020. Garner fell out of first-team contention after the appointment of Xisco Muñoz as Watford head coach, and on 30 January 2021, his loan was terminated. On the same day he joined fellow Championship side Nottingham Forest on loan for the remainder of the season. He scored his first goal for the club on 26 February 2021 in a 1–1 draw against arch-rivals Derby County in a league meeting at Pride Park. Following the conclusion of the season, he returned to Manchester United for pre-season training but rejoined Forest for a season-long loan after extending his contract with Manchester United. Garner was part of the Nottingham Forest team that gained promotion to the Premier League for the 2022–23 season, playing in their win in the Championship play-off final at Wembley Stadium in May 2022.

=== Everton ===
On 1 September 2022, Garner signed for Everton on a four-year deal, a decision which caused substantial backlash from Manchester United fans. The fee was reported to be of £9 million, with add-ons that could increase the fee to £15 million.

Garner made his debut for Everton as a substitute in a 2–1 loss at home to Manchester United on 9 October 2022.

On 27 September 2023, Garner scored his first goal for Everton in a 2–1 win away at Aston Villa in the third round of the EFL Cup. On 7 October, he scored his first Premier League goal in a 3–0 defeat of Bournemouth at Goodison Park.

== International career ==
Garner was a youth international and represented England at under-17, under-18, under-19, under-20 and under-21 levels. Garner captained the under-17 side that reached the semi-finals of the 2018 UEFA European Under-17 Championship. On 13 October 2020, Garner made his debut for the under-20 team during a 2–0 victory over Wales at St. George's Park.

On 27 August 2021, Garner received his first call up at under-21 level. On 7 September 2021, he made his under-21 debut during the 2–0 2023 UEFA European Under-21 Championship qualification win over Kosovo at Stadium MK.

On 14 June 2023, Garner was included in the England squad for the 2023 UEFA European Under-21 Championship; a tournament the Young Lions ultimately went on to win.

In March 2026, Garner received his first call-up to the England senior squad, ahead of home friendlies against Uruguay and Japan. On 27 March 2026, Garner made his debut during a 1–1 draw against Uruguay, and was awarded England Player of the Match.

== Style of play ==
Garner has played in several midfield roles, including as a central midfielder. He has also been used in wider and defensive positions at club and youth international level. His style of play includes his passing range, set-piece delivery, and defensive work rate.

== Career statistics ==
=== Club ===
As of match played 29 October 2026

Appearances and goals by club, season and competition
Club	Season	League			FA Cup		EFL Cup		Europe		Other		Total	
Club	Season	Division	Apps	Goals	Apps	Goals	Apps	Goals	Apps	Goals	Apps	Goals	Apps	Goals
Manchester United U21	2019–20	—			—		—		—		2 (Note: Appearance(s) in EFL Trophy)	1	2	1
Manchester United U21	2020–21	—			—		—		—		1	0	1	0
Manchester United U21	Total		—		—		—		—		3	1	3	1
Manchester United	2018–19	Premier League	1	0	0	0	0	0	0	0	—		1	0
Manchester United	2019–20	Premier League	1	0	0	0	1	0	4 (Note: Appearances in UEFA Europa League)	0	—		6	0
Manchester United	Total		2	0	0	0	1	0	4	0	—		7	0
Watford (loan)	2020–21	Championship	20	0	0	0	1	0	—		—		21	0
Nottingham Forest (loan)	2020–21	Championship	20	4	—		—		—		—		20	4
Nottingham Forest (loan)	2021–22	Championship	41	4	4	0	1	0	—		3 (Note: Appearances in Championship play-offs)	0	49	4
Nottingham Forest (loan)	Total		61	8	4	0	1	0	—		3	0	69	8
Everton	2022–23	Premier League	16	0	0	0	1	0	—		—		17	0
Everton	2023–24	Premier League	37	1	3	0	4	1	—		—		44	2
Everton	2024–25	Premier League	21	0	1	0	1	0	—		—		23	0
Everton	2025–26	Premier League	38	2	1	1	2	0	—		—		41	3
Everton	2026–27	Premier League	8	0	0	0	3	1	—		—		11	1
Everton	Total		120	3	5	1	11	2	—		—		136	6
Career total			203	11	9	1	14	2	4	0	6	1	236	15

=== International ===
As of match played 12 November 2026

Appearances and goals by national team and year
National team	Year	Apps	Goals
England	2026	6	0
Total		6	0

== Honours ==
Nottingham Forest

- EFL Championship play-offs: 2022

England U21

- UEFA European Under-21 Championship: 2023

Individual

- Denzil Haroun Reserve Player of the Year: 2019–20
- UEFA European Under-21 Championship Team of the Tournament: 2023
- Everton Player of the Season: 2025–26
- Everton Players' Player of the Season: 2025–26
