= 2026–27 Everton F.C. season =

English football club season

Everton
2026–27 season
- Owner: The Friedkin Group
- Chairman: Dan Friedkin
- Manager: David Moyes
- Stadium: Hill Dickinson Stadium
- Premier League: 6th
- FA Cup: Third round
- EFL Cup: Quarter-finals
- Top goalscorer: League: Thierno Barry (6); All: Thierno Barry (10)
Home colours	Away colours	Third colours

The 2026–27 season is the 149th season in the history of Everton Football Club, and the club's 73rd consecutive season in the top flight of English football. In addition to the domestic league, the club is also participating in the FA Cup and the EFL Cup.

CMC Markets announced a main club partnership with Everton ahead of the season.

== Kits ==
Home	Home Alt.	Home Alt. 2	Home Alt. 3
Away
Third

== Squad ==
As of 6 September 2026

No.	Player	Nationality	Position(s)	Date of birth (age)	Signed from	Apps	Goals	Assists
Goalkeepers
1	Jordan Pickford	(England)	GK	7 March 1994 (age 32)	(England) Sunderland	361	0	2
12	Mark Travers	(Republic of Ireland)	GK	18 May 1999 (age 27)	(England) Bournemouth	2	0	0
31	Tom King	(Wales)	GK	9 March 1995 (age 31)	(England) Wolverhampton Wanderers	0	0	0
Defenders
2	Ainsley Maitland-Niles	(England)	RB / DM	29 August 1997 (age 29)	(France) Lyon	1	1	0
4	Jarrad Branthwaite	(England)	CB	27 June 2002 (age 24)	(England) Carlisle United	99	5	1
5	Michael Keane	(England)	CB	11 January 1993 (age 33)	(England) Burnley	266	19	11
6	James Tarkowski (captain)	(England)	CB	19 November 1992 (age 34)	(England) Burnley	163	7	6
15	Jake O'Brien	(Republic of Ireland)	CB / RB	15 May 2001 (age 25)	(France) Lyon	64	3	2
16	Vitaliy Mykolenko	(Ukraine)	LB	29 May 1999 (age 27)	(Ukraine) Dynamo Kyiv	162	4	5
Midfielders
8	Kiernan Dewsbury-Hall	(England)	CM / AM	6 September 1998 (age 28)	(England) Chelsea	36	9	4
23	Christian Nørgaard	(Denmark)	DM / CM	10 March 1994 (age 32)	(England) Arsenal	0	0	0
24	Charly Alcaraz	(Argentina)	AM / CM	30 November 2002 (age 23)	(Brazil) Flamengo	41	3	4
30	Hayden Hackney	(England)	DM / CM	26 June 2002 (age 24)	(England) Middlesbrough	3	0	1
34	Merlin Röhl	(Germany)	CM / AM	5 July 2002 (age 24)	(Germany) SC Freiburg	21	1	0
37	James Garner	(England)	CM / DM	13 March 2001 (age 25)	(England) Manchester United	129	5	11
45	Harrison Armstrong	(England)	CM	19 January 2007 (age 19)	(England) Everton Academy	25	0	4
Forwards
10	Jack Grealish (on loan from Manchester City)	(England)	LW / AM	10 September 1995 (age 31)	(England) Manchester City	23	2	6
11	Thierno Barry	(France)	ST	21 October 2002 (age 24)	(Spain) Villarreal	45	12	1
19	Tyrique George	(England)	RW / LW	4 February 2006 (age 20)	(England) Chelsea	15	1	0
20	Tyler Dibling	(England)	RW / AM	17 February 2006 (age 20)	(England) Southampton	18	0	0
22	Brennan Johnson	(Wales)	RW / LW	23 May 2001 (age 25)	(England) Crystal Palace	4	1	1

Last updated: 6 September 2026.
Source: Everton F.C.

== Transfers and contracts ==
=== In ===
Date	Pos.	Player	From	Fee	Ref.
First Team
2 July 2026	CDM	(England) Hayden Hackney	(England) Middlesbrough	£16,500,000 (Note: A further £8,000,000 of potential add-ons.)	
6 July 2026	RW	(England) Tyrique George	(England) Chelsea	£18,000,000 (Note: A further £6,000,000 of potential add-ons.)	
6 July 2026	AM	(Germany) Merlin Röhl	(Germany) SC Freiburg	£17,000,000 (Note: Everton were required to sign Röhl permanently from Freiburg if they managed to survive relegation from the Premier League the previous season, which they did, thus triggering the obligatory buy option for around £17 million.)	
5 August 2026	CDM	(Denmark) Christian Nørgaard	(England) Arsenal	£7,000,000	
11 August 2026	RW	(Wales) Brennan Johnson	(England) Crystal Palace	Swap	
1 September 2026	RB	(England) Ainsley Maitland-Niles	(France) Lyon	£4,200,000	
Academy
17 July 2026	GK	(England) Zach Lee	(England) Kendal Town	Free	
2 September 2026	RB	(England) Ezra Carrington	(England) Manchester City	Free	
Total				£58,500,000	

=== Loaned in ===
Date	Pos.	Player	From	Date until	Ref.
First Team
1 September 2026	LW	(England) Jack Grealish	(England) Manchester City	End of season	
Academy

=== Loaned out ===
Date	Pos.	Player	To	Date until	Ref.
First Team
31 August 2026	LB	(Morocco) Adam Aznou	(Spain) Málaga	End of season	
Academy
20 July 2026	CF	(Wales) George Morgan	(France) Cannes	End of season	
31 August 2026	RW	(England) Joel Catesby	(England) Accrington Stanley	End of season	
1 September 2026	DF	(England) Eli Campbell	(England) Milton Keynes Dons	End of season	
8 September 2026	GK	(England) Douglass Lukjanciks	(England) Southport	6 October 2026	
15 October 2026	CB	(England) Luca Davis	(England) Morecambe	3 January 2027	
24 October 2026	GK	(England) George Pickford	(England) AFC Fylde	24 November 2026	

=== Out ===
Date	Pos.	Player	To	Fee	Ref.
First Team
11 August 2026	LW	(England) Dwight McNeil	(England) Crystal Palace	Swap	
1 September 2026	FW	(Guinea-Bissau) Beto	(Italy) Fiorentina	£15,400,000	
1 September 2026	CM	(England) Tim Iroegbunam	(England) Hull City	£22,000,000	
1 September 2026	RW	(Senegal) Iliman Ndiaye	(England) Manchester City	£65,000,000	
1 September 2026	RB	(Scotland) Nathan Patterson	(Italy) Torino	£850,000	
Academy
15 June 2026	LW	(England) Isaac Heath	(England) Cambridge United	Undisclosed	
2 July 2026 (Note: The transfer was announced on 15 June, and became official on 1 July once the Serbian SuperLiga transfer window opened.)	LW	(Germany) Coby Ebere	(Serbia) Čukarički	Undisclosed	
Total				£103,250,000	

=== Released / Out of contract ===
Date	Pos.	Player	Subsequent club	Joined date	Ref.
First Team
30 June 2026	RB	(England) Tyler Onyango	(England) Sheffield Wednesday	7 August 2026	
30 June 2026	CDM	(Senegal) Idrissa Gueye	(Saudi Arabia) Al-Diriyah	9 August 2026	
30 June 2026	RB	(Republic of Ireland) Séamus Coleman	Retired		
Academy
30 June 2026	GK	(Nigeria) Goodness Gospel-Eze	(England) Stockport County	1 July 2026	
30 June 2026	CF	(England) Francis Okoronkwo	(England) Doncaster Rovers	1 July 2026	
30 June 2026	CM	(England) Demi Akarakiri	(Italy) Cagliari	3 July 2026	
30 June 2026	LW	(England) Kean Wren	(England) Derby County	17 July 2026	
30 June 2026	CB	(England) Reece Welch	(England) Bradford City	5 August 2026	
30 June 2026	CB	(England) Bradley Moonan	(England) Lancaster City	6 August 2026	
30 June 2026	RB	(England) Roman Dixon	(England) Walsall	11 August 2026	
30 June 2026	RW	(England) Jacob Beaumont-Clark	(England) Torquay United	28 August 2026	
30 June 2026	LW	(Ghana) Kingsford Boakye			
30 June 2026	LB	(England) Louis Poland	(England) Sheffield Wednesday	8 September 2026	
30 June 2026	CF	(Scotland) Charlie Stewart			

=== New contract ===
Date	Pos.	Player	Contract until	Ref.
First Team
8 June 2026	LB	(Ukraine) Vitaliy Mykolenko	30 June 2029	
Academy
1 July 2026 (Note: The contract agreement was announced on 12 May, and commenced on 1 July.)	LW	(Wales) Shea Pita	30 June 2028 (Note: First professional contract.)	
16 July 2026	RB	(England) Rocco Lambert	30 June 2027	
14 August 2026	CM	(England) Melvin Matos	30 June 2028	
9 September 2026	CM	(England) Arthur Barratt	30 June 2029	

== Pre-season and friendlies ==
On 28 May, The Toffees announced their first pre-season friendly against Newcastle United in Edinburgh. In June, six further fixtures were confirmed against Dundee, Bolton Wanderers, Stoke City, Hamburger SV, VfB Stuttgart and Lille.

Win Draw Loss Fixtures

18 July 2026 Friendly	Dundee	0−4	Everton	Dundee, Scotland
14:00 BST		Report	Beto 37'; Barry 69'; Foster 81'; McNeil 89'	Stadium: Dens Park; Attendance: 4,392

25 July 2026 Friendly	Bolton Wanderers	0–0	Everton	Horwich
15:00 BST		Report		Stadium: Toughsheet Community Stadium; Referee: James Bell

28 July 2026 Friendly	Stoke City	1−0	Everton	Stoke-on-Trent
19:45 BST	Kelly 59'	Report		Stadium: bet365 Stadium; Referee: Thomas Bramall

1 August 2026 Friendly	Hamburger SV	1−2	Everton	Bahrenfeld, Germany
17:00 CEST	Daka 49'	Report	Röhl 40'; Torunarigha 90+4' (o.g.)	Stadium: Volksparkstadion; Referee: Harm Osmers

8 August 2026 Friendly	VfB Stuttgart	3−1	Everton	Stuttgart, Germany
17:00 CEST	Nartey 16'; Hendriks 65'; Bouanani 90+1'	Report	Barry 72' (pen.)	Stadium: MHPArena; Attendance: 43,000

12 August 2026 Friendly	Newcastle United	1−3	Everton	Edinburgh, Scotland
17:15 BST	Barnes 85'	Report	Barry 27'; Ndiaye 36' (pen.); George 73'	Stadium: Scottish Gas Murrayfield Stadium; Attendance: 22,982; Referee: Nick Walsh

15 August 2026 Friendly	Everton	1−1	Lille	Vauxhall
15:00 BST	Ndiaye 41' (pen.)	Report	Haraldsson 90+3'	Stadium: Hill Dickinson Stadium; Referee: Peter Bankes

2 October 2026 Friendly	Everton	3−3	Blackburn Rovers	Vauxhall
14:00 BST	Alcaraz 8' (pen.); Barry 45'; Nsangou 90'	Report	Cantwell; Afolayan; Kargbo 87' (pen.)	Stadium: Hill Dickinson Stadium; Attendance: 0 (BCD)

12 November 2026 Friendly	Everton	4−1	Derby County	Vauxhall
14:00 BST	Alcaraz (x2); Nørgaard; Nsangou	Report	Salvesen	Stadium: Hill Dickinson Stadium; Attendance: 0 (BCD)

== Competitions ==
=== Overall record ===
Competition	First match	Last match	Starting round	Final position	Record							
Competition	First match	Last match	Starting round	Final position	Pld	W	D	L	GF	GA	GD	Win %
Premier League	22 August 2026	30 May 2027	Matchday 1	TBD	10	4	4	2	12	10	+2	40.00
FA Cup	January 2027	TBD	Third round	TBD	0	0	0	0	0	0	+0	—
EFL Cup	26 August 2026	TBD	Second round	TBD	3	3	0	0	8	1	+7	100.00
Total					13	7	4	2	20	11	+9	53.85

Last updated: 6 November 2026
Source: Soccerway

=== Premier League ===
==== League table ====
Pos	Team	Pld	W	D	L	GF	GA	GD	Pts	Qualification or relegation
4	Liverpool	10	5	3	2	14	10	+4	18	Qualification for the Champions League league phase
5	Chelsea	10	5	1	4	19	16	+3	16	Qualification for the Europa League league phase (Note: The winners of the 2026–27 FA Cup and the 5th-placed team both qualify for the Europa League. If the FA Cup winners finish in the top five, the 6th-placed team will qualify. If England are one of the two associations with the highest UEFA coefficient points, 5th place will qualify for the Champions League and the other qualifying spots will move down one position.)
6	Everton	10	4	4	2	12	10	+2	16	
7	Bournemouth	10	4	3	3	16	14	+2	15	
8	Brentford	10	3	5	2	16	11	+5	14	

Updated to match(es) played on 8 November 2026. Source: Premier League
Rules for classification: 1) Points; 2) Goal difference; 3) Goals scored; 4) If the champions, relegated teams or qualified teams for UEFA competitions cannot be determined by rules 1 to 3 following the completion of the competition, rules 4.1 to 4.3 are applied between such teams – 4.1) Head-to-head points; 4.2) Head-to-head away goals; 4.3) Play-off at a neutral site.

==== Results summary ====
Overall								Home						Away					
Pld	W	D	L	GF	GA	GD	Pts	W	D	L	GF	GA	GD	W	D	L	GF	GA	GD
10	4	4	2	12	10	+2	16	3	1	1	8	5	+3	1	3	1	4	5	−1

Last updated: 6 November 2026.
Source: Soccerway

==== Results by round ====
Round	1	2	3	4	5	6	7	8	9	10	11	12	13	14	15	16	17	18	19	20	21	22	23	24	25	26	27	28	29	30	31	32	33	34	35	36	37	38
Ground	H	A	H	A	H	A	H	A	A	H	A	H	A	H	A	A	H	H	A	H	A	H	A	H	H	A	H	A	A	H	A	H	H	A	H	A	H	A
Result	W	D	D	D	W	D	L	L	W	W																												
Position	4	7	8	9	7	5	8	11	7	6																												
Points	3	4	5	6	9	10	10	10	13	16																												

Updated to match(es) played on 6 November 2026. Source: Premier League
A = Away; H = Home; W = Win; D = Draw; L = Loss; P = Postponed

==== Matches ====
The Premier League fixtures were released on 19 June 2026.

Win Draw Loss Fixtures

22 August 2026 1	Everton	2–0	Crystal Palace	Liverpool
15:00 BST	Dewsbury-Hall 42'; Barry 53'	Report	Kamada (yellow card) 30'	Stadium: Hill Dickinson Stadium; Attendance: 51,820; Referee: Paul Tierney

29 August 2026 2	Bournemouth	1–1	Everton	Bournemouth
15:00 BST	Scott (yellow card) 21', (goal) 41'; Smith (yellow card) 23'; Tavernier (yellow card) 53'	Report	Garner (yellow card) 59'; Tarkowski 90+1'; Alcaraz (yellow card) 90+5'	Stadium: Dean Court; Attendance: 11,135; Referee: Chris Kavanagh

6 September 2026 3	Everton	2–2	Manchester United	Liverpool
14:00 BST	Armstrong (yellow card) 13'; Johnson (yellow card) 34'; Röhl (yellow card) 64'; George 83'; Maitland-Niles 90+6'	Report	Mbeumo 46'; Shaw (yellow card) 62'; Maguire (yellow card) 79'; Dalot (yellow card) 81'; Šeško 88'	Stadium: Hill Dickinson Stadium; Attendance: 52,302; Referee: John Brooks
Note: Fixture was initially scheduled for 5 September, but was moved for live Sky Sports broadcast.

12 September 2026 4	Tottenham Hotspur	0–0	Everton	Tottenham
17:30 BST		Report	Dewsbury-Hall (yellow card) 68'; Garner (yellow card) 84'	Stadium: Tottenham Hotspur Stadium; Attendance: 60,477; Referee: Darren England
Note: Fixture was initially scheduled for a 15:00 kick-off, but was pushed back for live Sky Sports broadcasting.

19 September 2026 5	Everton	1–0	Ipswich Town	Liverpool
15:00 BST	Barry 11'; Mykolenko (yellow card) 42'; Armstrong (yellow card) 90+6'	Report	Fatawu (yellow card) 35' (yellow-red card) 67'; Flemming (yellow card) 90+2'	Stadium: Hill Dickinson Stadium; Attendance: 52,008; Referee: Stuart Attwell

11 October 2026 6	Hull City	2–2	Everton	Kingston upon Hull
14:00 BST	Crooks (yellow card) 13'; McBurnie (yellow card) 21'; Gelhardt 48'; Belloumi 74'	Report	Dewsbury-Hall 55'; Barry 68'	Stadium: MKM Stadium; Attendance: 24,258; Referee: Michael Salisbury
Note: Fixture was initially scheduled for 10 October, but was rescheduled for live Sky Sports broadcasting.

17 October 2026 7	Everton	0–2	Chelsea	Liverpool
12:30 BST	Armstrong (yellow card) 23'; Tarkowski (yellow card) 34'; Nørgaard (yellow card) 89'	Report	Neto (yellow card) 27', (goal) 46', 90'; Acheampong (yellow card) 32'; Rogers (yellow card) 34'; Palmer (yellow card) 65'	Stadium: Hill Dickinson Stadium; Attendance: 52,271; Referee: Paul Tierney
Note: Fixture was initially scheduled for a 15:00 kick-off, but was pushed back for live TNT Sports broadcasting.

24 October 2026 8	Arsenal	2–0	Everton	Holloway
15:00 BST	Konsa 7'; Lewis-Skelly (yellow card) 58'; Gabriel 68'	Report	Mykolenko (yellow card) 45+2'; Garner (yellow card) 66'; Tarkowski (yellow card) 79'	Stadium: Emirates Stadium; Attendance: 60,207; Referee: Tony Harrington

2 November 2026 9	Newcastle United	0–1	Everton	Newcastle upon Tyne
20:00 GMT	Burn (yellow card) 32'; Ramsey (yellow card) 90+6' (yellow-red card) 90+8'; Schär (yellow card) 90+9'	Report	Barry 49'; George (yellow card) 52'; Johnson (yellow card) 90+9'	Stadium: St James' Park; Attendance: 52,279; Referee: John Brooks
Note: Fixture was initially scheduled for 31 October, but was rescheduled for live Sky Sports broadcasting.

6 November 2026 10	Everton	3–1	Coventry City	Liverpool
20:00 GMT	Barry 56', 61'; Dewsbury-Hall 81'; Branthwaite (yellow card) 88'	Report	Gboho 52'; Yirenkyi (yellow card) 88'	Stadium: Hill Dickinson Stadium; Attendance: 52,395; Referee: Stuart Attwell
Note: Fixture was initially scheduled for 7 November, but was brought forward to the night prior for live Sky Sports broadcasting.

23 November 2026 11	Brentford	v	Everton	Brentford
20:00 GMT				Stadium: Brentford Community Stadium
Note: Fixture was initially scheduled for 21 November, but was pushed back two-days for live Sky Sports broadcasting.

29 November 2026 12	Everton	v	Liverpool	Liverpool
12:00 GMT				Stadium: Hill Dickinson Stadium
Note: Fixture was initially scheduled for 28 November, but was pushed back a day for live TNT Sports broadcasting.

2 December 2026 13	Aston Villa	v	Everton	Birmingham
20:15 GMT				Stadium: Villa Park
Note: Fixture was initially scheduled for a 20:00 kick-off, but was pushed back fifteen minutes for live Sky Sports broadcasting.

6 December 2026 14	Everton	v	Fulham	Liverpool
14:00 GMT				Stadium: Hill Dickinson Stadium
Note: Fixture was initially scheduled for 5 December, but was pushed back a day due to Fulham in action on the preceding Thursday.

13 December 2026 15	Brighton & Hove Albion	v	Everton	Falmer
14:00 GMT				Stadium: Falmer Stadium
Note: Fixture was initially scheduled for 12 December, but was pushed back a day due to Brighton in UEFA Conference League action on the preceding Thursday.

20 December 2026 16	Nottingham Forest	v	Everton	West Bridgford
14:00 GMT				Stadium: City Ground
Note: Fixture was initially scheduled for 19 December, but was pushed back a day due to EFL Cup involvements on the preceding Thursday.

26 December 2026 17	Everton	v	Sunderland	Liverpool
15:00 GMT				Stadium: Hill Dickinson Stadium

29 December 2026 18	Everton	v	Manchester City	Liverpool
20:15 GMT				Stadium: Hill Dickinson Stadium
Note: Fixture was initially scheduled for 30 December, but was brought forward 24 hours for live Sky Sports broadcasting.

1 January 2027 19	Leeds United	v	Everton	Leeds
20:00 GMT				Stadium: Elland Road
Note: Fixture was initially scheduled for 2 January, but was brought forward a day for live Sky Sports broadcasting.

5 January 2027 20	Everton	v	Aston Villa	Liverpool
19:30 GMT				Stadium: Hill Dickinson Stadium
Note: Fixture was initially scheduled for 6 January, but was brought forward a day for live Sky Sports broadcasting.

16 January 2027 21	Coventry City	v	Everton	Coventry
12:30 GMT				Stadium: Coventry Building Society Arena
Note: Fixture was initially scheduled for a 15:00 kick-off, but was brought forward for live TNT Sports broadcasting.

24 January 2027 22	Everton	v	Brentford	Liverpool
14:00 GMT				Stadium: Hill Dickinson Stadium
Note: Fixture was initially scheduled for 23 January, but was pushed back a day for live Sky Sports broadcasting.

30 January 2027 23	Liverpool	v	Everton	Liverpool
12:30 GMT				Stadium: Anfield
Note: Fixture was initially scheduled for a 15:00 kick-off, but was brought forward for live TNT Sports broadcasting.

6 February 2027 24	Everton	v	Newcastle United	Liverpool
15:00 GMT				Stadium: Hill Dickinson Stadium

10 February 2027 25	Everton	v	Leeds United	Liverpool
20:00 GMT				Stadium: Hill Dickinson Stadium

20 February 2027 26	Sunderland	v	Everton	Sunderland
15:00 GMT				Stadium: Stadium of Light

27 February 2027 27	Everton	v	Nottingham Forest	Liverpool
15:00 GMT				Stadium: Hill Dickinson Stadium

3 March 2027 28	Manchester City	v	Everton	Manchester
20:00 GMT				Stadium: Etihad Stadium

13 March 2027 29	Manchester United	v	Everton	Trafford
15:00 GMT				Stadium: Old Trafford

20 March 2027 30	Everton	v	Tottenham Hotspur	Liverpool
15:00 GMT				Stadium: Hill Dickinson Stadium

10 April 2027 31	Crystal Palace	v	Everton	Selhurst
15:00 BST				Stadium: Selhurst Park

17 April 2027 32	Everton	v	Bournemouth	Liverpool
15:00 BST				Stadium: Hill Dickinson Stadium

24 April 2027 33	Everton	v	Brighton & Hove Albion	Liverpool
15:00 BST				Stadium: Hill Dickinson Stadium

1 May 2027 34	Fulham	v	Everton	Fulham
15:00 BST				Stadium: Craven Cottage

8 May 2027 35	Everton	v	Hull City	Liverpool
15:00 BST				Stadium: Hill Dickinson Stadium

15 May 2027 36	Chelsea	v	Everton	Fulham
15:00 BST				Stadium: Stamford Bridge

23 May 2027 37	Everton	v	Arsenal	Liverpool
15:00 BST				Stadium: Hill Dickinson Stadium

30 May 2027 38	Ipswich Town	v	Everton	Ipswich
16:00 BST				Stadium: Portman Road

=== FA Cup ===
Win Draw Loss Fixtures

=== EFL Cup ===
Everton entered the EFL Cup in the second round, and were drawn away to Preston North End. They were then drawn at home to Wolverhampton Wanderers in the third round, at home to Newcastle United in the fourth round, and away to Fleetwood Town in the quarter-finals.

Win Draw Loss Fixtures

26 August 2026 Second round	Preston North End	0–4	Everton	Preston
20:00 BST		Report	Barry 25', 59', 70'; Johnson 72'	Stadium: Deepdale; Attendance: 16,834; Referee: Tony Harrington

16 September 2026 Third round	Everton	1–0	Wolverhampton Wanderers	Liverpool
19:45 BST	Grealish (yellow card) 11'; Alcaraz 80'	Report	Tchatchoua (yellow card) 10'; Doyle (yellow card) 90+1'	Stadium: Hill Dickinson Stadium; Attendance: 50,970; Referee: Thomas Bramall
Note: Fixture was initially scheduled for 9 September, but was pushed back a week due to Liverpool's home match against Atlético Madrid in the UEFA Champions League.

29 October 2026 Fourth round	Everton	3–1	Newcastle United	Liverpool
19:45 GMT	Garner 34'; Hackney 45', (yellow card) 60'; Barry 69'; Dewsbury-Hall (yellow card) 74'; Mykolenko (yellow card) 81'; Tarkowski (yellow card) 89'; Pickford (yellow card) 89'	Report	Schär (yellow card) 81'; Burn 88', (yellow card) 89'; Joelinton (yellow card) 89'	Stadium: Hill Dickinson Stadium; Attendance: 51,894; Referee: Farai Hallam

17 December 2026 Quarter-finals	Fleetwood Town	v	Everton	Fleetwood
20:00 GMT		Report		Stadium: Highbury Stadium

== Statistics ==
=== Appearances and goals ===
As of match played 6 November 2026

Players with no appearances are not included on the list, italics indicate a loaned in player

No.	Pos	Nat	Player	Total		Premier League		FA Cup		EFL Cup	
No.	Pos	Nat	Player	Apps	Goals	Apps	Goals	Apps	Goals	Apps	Goals
1	GK	(England) ENG	Jordan Pickford	13	0	10+0	0	0+0	0	3+0	0
2	DF	(England) ENG	Ainsley Maitland-Niles	7	1	4+1	1	0+0	0	1+1	0
4	DF	(England) ENG	Jarrad Branthwaite	9	0	9+0	0	0+0	0	0+0	0
5	DF	(England) ENG	Michael Keane	5	0	1+2	0	0+0	0	2+0	0
6	DF	(England) ENG	James Tarkowski	12	1	10+0	1	0+0	0	2+0	0
8	MF	(England) ENG	Kiernan Dewsbury-Hall	13	3	10+0	3	0+0	0	3+0	0
10	FW	(England) ENG	Jack Grealish	6	0	3+2	0	0+0	0	0+1	0
11	FW	(France) FRA	Thierno Barry	13	10	10+0	6	0+0	0	3+0	4
15	DF	(Republic of Ireland) IRL	Jake O'Brien	8	0	2+4	0	0+0	0	2+0	0
16	DF	(Ukraine) UKR	Vitaliy Mykolenko	12	0	9+0	0	0+0	0	3+0	0
19	FW	(England) ENG	Tyrique George	13	1	7+3	1	0+0	0	1+2	0
20	FW	(England) ENG	Tyler Dibling	7	0	1+3	0	0+0	0	3+0	0
22	FW	(Wales) WAL	Brennan Johnson	13	1	5+5	0	0+0	0	0+3	1
23	MF	(Denmark) DEN	Christian Nørgaard	2	0	0+1	0	0+0	0	0+1	0
24	MF	(Argentina) ARG	Charly Alcaraz	8	1	0+5	0	0+0	0	0+3	1
30	MF	(England) ENG	Hayden Hackney	11	1	1+8	0	0+0	0	2+0	1
34	MF	(Germany) GER	Merlin Röhl	9	0	7+0	0	0+0	0	2+0	0
37	MF	(England) ENG	James Garner	13	1	9+1	0	0+0	0	3+0	1
45	MF	(England) ENG	Harrison Armstrong	12	0	10+0	0	0+0	0	1+1	0
Player who featured but departed the club on loan during the season:
39	DF	(Morocco) MAR	Adam Aznou	1	0	0	0	0	0	0+1	0
Players who featured but departed the club permanently during the season:
2	DF	(Scotland) SCO	Nathan Patterson	1	0	0	0	0	0	0+1	0
9	FW	(Guinea-Bissau) GBS	Beto	2	0	0+2	0	0	0	0	0
10	FW	(Senegal) SEN	Iliman Ndiaye	3	0	2	0	0	0	1	0
42	MF	(England) ENG	Tim Iroegbunam	1	0	0+1	0	0	0	0	0

=== Discipline ===
As of match played 6 November 2026

Rank	No.	Pos.	Player	Premier League			FA Cup			EFL Cup			Total		
Rank	No.	Pos.	Player	Yellow card	(yellow card) (yellow-red card)	Red card	Yellow card	(yellow card) (yellow-red card)	Red card	Yellow card	(yellow card) (yellow-red card)	Red card	Yellow card	(yellow card) (yellow-red card)	Red card
1	6	CB	(England) James Tarkowski	2	0	0	0	0	0	1	0	0	3	0	0
1	16	LB	(Ukraine) Vitaliy Mykolenko	2	0	0	0	0	0	1	0	0	3	0	0
1	37	CDM	(England) James Garner	3	0	0	0	0	0	0	0	0	3	0	0
1	45	CM	(England) Harrison Armstrong	3	0	0	0	0	0	0	0	0	3	0	0
5	8	CM	(England) Kiernan Dewsbury-Hall	1	0	0	0	0	0	1	0	0	2	0	0
5	22	RW	(Wales) Brennan Johnson	2	0	0	0	0	0	0	0	0	2	0	0
7	1	GK	(England) Jordan Pickford	0	0	0	0	0	0	1	0	0	1	0	0
7	4	CB	(England) Jarrad Branthwaite	1	0	0	0	0	0	0	0	0	1	0	0
7	10	AM	(England) Jack Grealish	0	0	0	0	0	0	1	0	0	1	0	0
7	19	LW	(England) Tyrique George	1	0	0	0	0	0	0	0	0	1	0	0
7	23	CDM	(Denmark) Christian Nørgaard	1	0	0	0	0	0	0	0	0	1	0	0
7	24	CM	(Argentina) Charly Alcaraz	1	0	0	0	0	0	0	0	0	1	0	0
7	30	CM	(England) Hayden Hackney	0	0	0	0	0	0	1	0	0	1	0	0
7	34	AM	(Germany) Merlin Röhl	1	0	0	0	0	0	0	0	0	1	0	0
Total				18	0	0	0	0	0	6	0	0	24	0	0

== Awards ==
=== Player Awards ===
==== Premier League Goal of the Month ====
Month	Pos.	Player	Opposition	Result	Ref.
September	DF	(England) Ainsley Maitland-Niles	v. Manchester United	Nominated	

==== Premier League Save of the Month ====
Month	Pos.	Player	Opposition	Result	Ref.
August	GK	(England) Jordan Pickford	v. Crystal Palace	Won	
