= Premier League Summer Series =

- Founded: 2023
- Teams: 4–6
- Related competitions: Premier League; Premier League Asia Trophy
- Current champions: Manchester United (1st title)
- Most championships: Chelsea; Manchester United (1 title each)
- Broadcasters: Sky Sports (Ireland and UK); List of international broadcasters

The Premier League Summer Series is a pre-season friendly association football tournament hosted in the United States. The eight-day competition was first announced in 2023, and is the second competition affiliated to the Premier League to be hosted outside England after the Premier League Asia Trophy.

== History ==
The inaugural tournament was announced in April 2023 by Premier League chief executive Richard Masters, and took place between 22 and 30 July 2023 at the following stadiums:

- Lincoln Financial Field in Philadelphia, Pennsylvania
- Mercedes-Benz Stadium in Atlanta, Georgia
- Exploria Stadium in Orlando, Florida
- Red Bull Arena in Harrison, New Jersey
- FedExField in Landover, Maryland

The participants of the first competition were Aston Villa, Brentford, Brighton & Hove Albion, Chelsea, Fulham and Newcastle United. Chelsea finished as champions while Aston Villa were runners-up.

In March 2025, after the cancellation of the 2024 competition, it was announced that the Summer Series would return in July and August 2025, with Bournemouth, Everton, Manchester United and West Ham United as participants, and matches played in Atlanta, Chicago and East Rutherford. Manchester United finished as champions while West Ham were runners-up.

== Tournaments ==
Premier League Summer Series tournaments
Edition	Year	Winners	Runners-up	Third place	Fourth place	Ref.
1	2023	Chelsea	Aston Villa	Newcastle United	Brighton & Hove Albion	
2	2025	Manchester United	West Ham United	Bournemouth	Everton	

== Performance by team ==
Premier League Summer Series performances by team
Team	Winners	Runners-up	Third place	Fourth place	Total
Chelsea	1	—	—	—	1
Manchester United	1	—	—	—	1
Aston Villa	—	1	—	—	1
West Ham United	—	1	—	—	1
Bournemouth	—	—	1	—	1
Newcastle United	—	—	1	—	1
Brighton & Hove Albion	—	—	—	1	1
Everton	—	—	—	1	1

== See also ==
- Premier League Asia Trophy
