= Vitaliy Mykolenko =

Ukrainian footballer (born 1999)

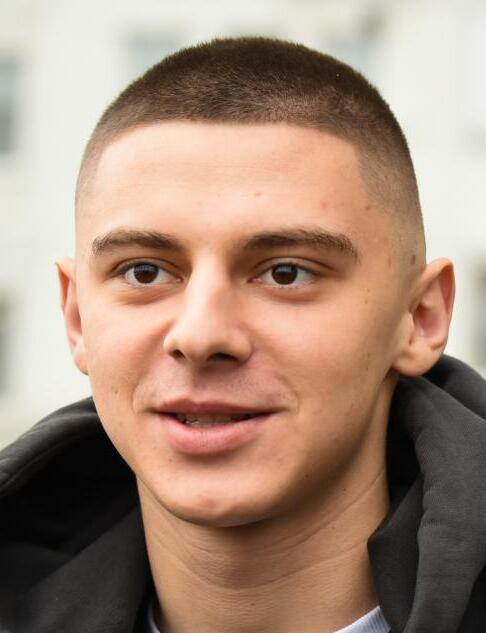
- Mykolenko in 2021

Personal information
- Full name: Vitaliy Serhiyovych Mykolenko
- Date of birth: 29 May 1999 (age 27)
- Place of birth: Cherkasy, Ukraine
- Height: 1.80 m (5 ft 11 in)
- Position: Left-back

Team information
- Current team: Everton
- Number: 16

Youth career
- 2012–2017: Dynamo Kyiv

Senior career*
Years	Team	Apps	(Gls)
2017–2022	Dynamo Kyiv	88	(5)
2022–	Everton	152	(4)

International career^{‡}
2016	Ukraine U17	6	(0)
2016–2017	Ukraine U18	3	(0)
2017–2018	Ukraine U19	16	(2)
2018	Ukraine U21	4	(0)
2018–	Ukraine	57	(1)
Medal record
Men's football
Representing Ukraine
UEFA European Under-19 Championship
Bronze medal – third place	2018 Finland
- * Club domestic league appearances and goals as of 22:34, 6 November 2026 (UTC) ‡ National team caps and goals as of 15:30, 18 November 2026 (UTC)

Vitaliy Serhiyovych Mykolenko (Ukrainian: Віта́лій Сергі́йович Мико́ленко; born 29 May 1999) is a Ukrainian professional footballer who plays as a left-back for Premier League club Everton and the Ukraine national team.

== Club career ==
=== Dynamo Kyiv ===
Born in Cherkasy, Mykolenko is a product of the Dynamo Kyiv youth sportive school.

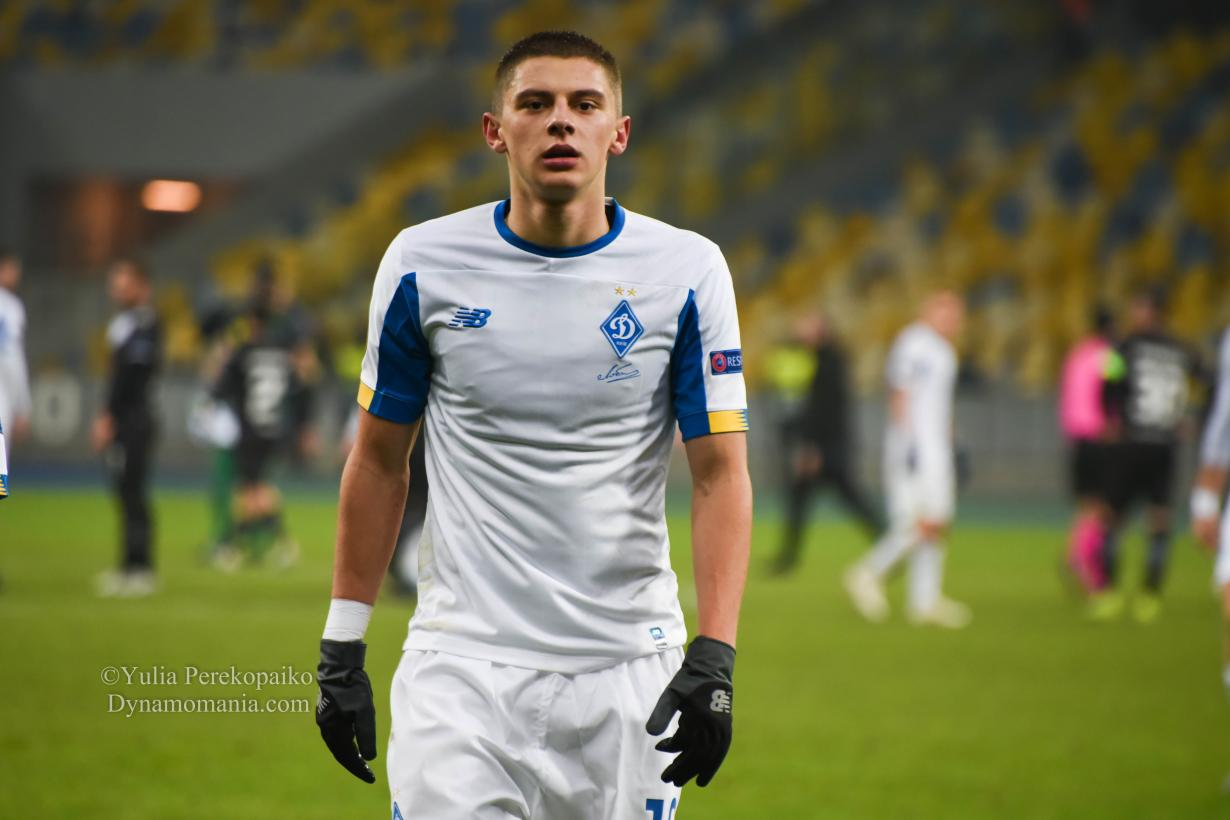
Mykolenko playing for Dynamo Kyiv in 2019

He played for Dynamo in the Ukrainian Premier League Reserves and in August 2017 he was promoted to the senior squad team. Mykolenko made his debut in the Ukrainian Premier League for Dynamo Kyiv on 20 August 2017, playing in a winning match against Stal Kamianske. On 25 October 2018, Mykolenko made his debut in the UEFA Europa League, starting in Dynamo's 2–1 victory over Rennes at the Roazhon Park.

Mykolenko was named the best young player in the 2018–19 Ukrainian Premier League season.

=== Everton ===
On 1 January 2022, Mykolenko joined English side Everton on a four-and-a-half-year deal until June 2026 for an undisclosed fee. The club assigned him the number 19 shirt. On 3 March 2022, as a gesture of goodwill, Mykolenko was named Everton captain for an FA Cup Fifth round match against Boreham Wood due to the Russian invasion of Ukraine.

In March, Mykolenko called out the captain of the Russia national team, Artem Dzyuba, in an Instagram post and questioned why Dzyuba and his Russian teammates were "silent" while "peaceful civilians were being killed in Ukraine" in the Russian invasion of Ukraine. On 8 May, Mykolenko scored his first goal for Everton, a stunning volley from 25 yards in a 2–1 away victory against Leicester City in a Premier League fixture.

He marked his 100th appearance for the club (in the Premier League) in their league game of the 2024–25 season away to Brentford on 7 March 2025.

On 8 June 2026, it was revealed that Mykolenko had signed a new contract lasting until June 2029.

== International career ==
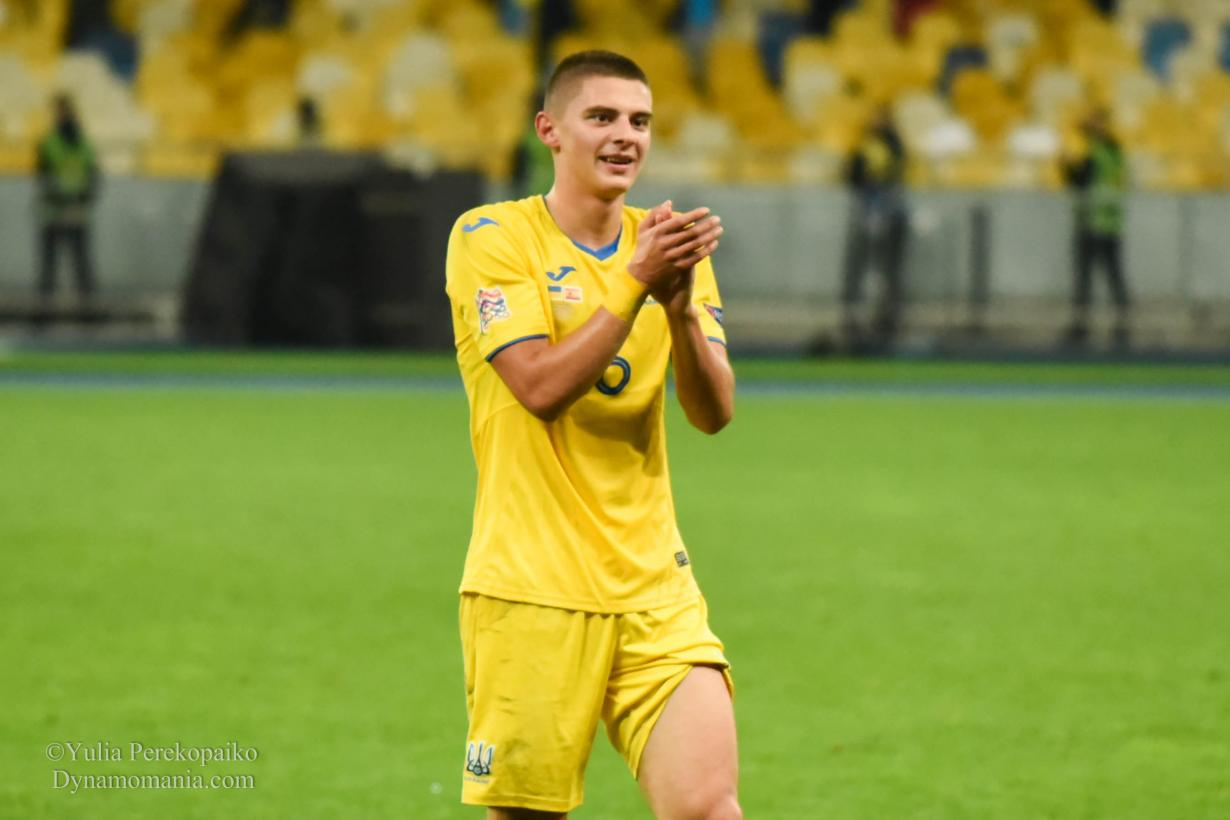
Mykolenko playing for Ukraine in 2020

On 20 November 2018, Mykolenko debuted for the Ukraine national team at age 19 in a friendly match against Turkey, ending in a goalless draw.

Still eligible for youth football, Mykolenko just missed out on winning the 2019 FIFA U-20 World Cup but was named to the eventual winner Ukraine squad for the tournament, but had to be withdrawn from the competition a few days later due to injury.

Mykolenko was a member of Ukraine's squad for UEFA Euro 2020 and started four of the team's five matches as they reached the quarter-finals.

On 11 June 2022, he scored his first senior international goal in Ukraine's 3–0 victory over Armenia in the UEFA Nations League.

In May 2024, Mykolenko was called up to represent Ukraine at UEFA Euro 2024.

== Career statistics ==
=== Club ===
As of match played 19 September 2026

Appearances and goals by club, season and competition
Club	Season	League			National cup (Note: Includes Ukrainian Cup, FA Cup)		League cup (Note: Includes EFL Cup)		Europe		Other		Total	
Club	Season	Division	Apps	Goals	Apps	Goals	Apps	Goals	Apps	Goals	Apps	Goals	Apps	Goals
Dynamo Kyiv	2017–18	Ukrainian Premier League	5	0	2	0	—		0	0	0	0	7	0
Dynamo Kyiv	2018–19	Ukrainian Premier League	23	0	1	0	—		8 (Note: Appearances in UEFA Europa League)	1	0	0	32	1
Dynamo Kyiv	2019–20	Ukrainian Premier League	23	3	4	0	—		8 (Note: Two appearances in UEFA Champions League, six appearances and one goal in UEFA Europa League)	1	1 (Note: Appearance in Ukrainian Super Cup)	0	36	4
Dynamo Kyiv	2020–21	Ukrainian Premier League	22	2	3	0	—		11 (Note: Seven appearances in UEFA Champions League, four appearances in UEFA Europa League)	0	0	0	36	2
Dynamo Kyiv	2021–22	Ukrainian Premier League	15	0	0	0	—		5 (Note: Appearances in UEFA Champions League)	0	1	0	21	0
Dynamo Kyiv	Total		88	5	10	0	—		32	2	2	0	132	7
Everton	2021–22	Premier League	13	1	3	0	—		—		—		16	1
Everton	2022–23	Premier League	34	0	2	0	0	0	—		—		36	0
Everton	2023–24	Premier League	28	2	3	0	3	0	—		—		34	2
Everton	2024–25	Premier League	35	1	1	0	1	0	—		—		37	1
Everton	2025–26	Premier League	33	0	1	0	2	0	—		—		36	0
Everton	2026–27	Premier League	5	0	0	0	2	0	—		—		7	0
Everton	Total		148	4	10	0	8	0	—		—		166	4
Career total			237	10	20	0	8	0	35	2	2	0	298	11

=== International ===
As of match played 17 November 2026

Appearances and goals by national team and year
National team	Year	Apps	Goals
Ukraine	2018	1	0
Ukraine	2019	7	0
Ukraine	2020	3	0
Ukraine	2021	10	0
Ukraine	2022	7	1
Ukraine	2023	9	0
Ukraine	2024	9	0
Ukraine	2025	5	0
Ukraine	2026	6	0
Total		57	1

As of match played 7 June 2026. Ukraine score listed first, score column indicates score after each Mykolenko goal.

List of international goals scored by Vitaliy Mykolenko
No.	Date	Venue	Cap	Opponent	Score	Result	Competition
1	11 June 2022	Stadion Miejski ŁKS, Łódź, Poland	25	Armenia	3–0	3–0	2022–23 UEFA Nations League B

== Honours ==
Dynamo Kyiv

- Ukrainian Premier League: 2020–21
- Ukrainian Cup: 2019–20, 2020–21
- Ukrainian Super Cup: 2018, 2019, 2020

Individual

- Golden talent of Ukraine: 2018 (U-19), 2019 (U-21), 2020 (U-21)
- Ukrainian Premier League Best young player: 2018–19
- Everton Goal of the Season: 2021–22 (vs. Leicester City, 8 May 2022)
