= Kiernan Dewsbury-Hall =

English footballer (born 1998)

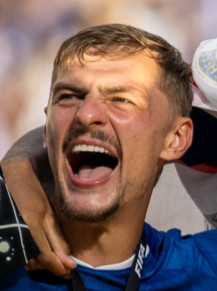
- Dewsbury-Hall with Chelsea in 2025

Personal information
- Full name: Kiernan Frank Dewsbury-Hall
- Date of birth: 6 September 1998 (age 28)
- Place of birth: Nottingham, England
- Height: 5 ft 9 in (1.76 m)
- Position: Attacking midfielder

Team information
- Current team: Everton
- Number: 8

Youth career
- 2006–2019: Leicester City

Senior career*
Years	Team	Apps	(Gls)
2019–2024	Leicester City	103	(15)
2020	→ Blackpool (loan)	10	(4)
2020–2021	→ Luton Town (loan)	39	(3)
2024–2025	Chelsea	13	(0)
2025–	Everton	41	(11)
- * Club domestic league appearances and goals as of 22:24, 6 November 2026 (UTC)

Kiernan Frank Dewsbury-Hall (born 6 September 1998) is an English professional footballer who plays as an attacking midfielder for Premier League club Everton.

Dewsbury-Hall started his career with Leicester City, joining their youth system in 2006. He signed his first professional contract in 2017, and made his senior debut in the FA Cup in 2019. He went on loan to Blackpool in 2020 and to Luton Town for the 2020–21 season. After impressing for Luton, he broke into the Leicester first-team the following season. The team was relegated in the 2022–23 season, but Dewsbury-Hall played an integral role in returning the club to the Premier League by winning the Championship, and won Leicester Player of the Season. He signed for Chelsea in the summer of 2024, and transferred to Everton the following summer.

== Early and personal life ==
Dewsbury-Hall was born in Nottingham, Nottinghamshire, and grew up in Shepshed, Leicestershire. He attended Newcroft Primary Academy and Shepshed High School. Growing up, he idolised Paul Scholes and was also interested in snooker.

== Club career ==
=== Leicester City ===
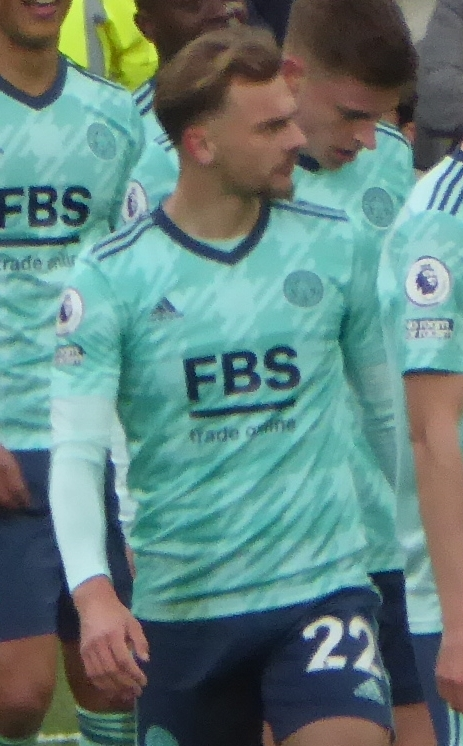
Dewsbury-Hall playing for Leicester City in 2022

He joined his first club, Shepshed Dynamo Warriors of the Leicester Mutual League, at age six, where he played at the under-8 and under-9 levels. He joined the Leicester City Academy in 2006 aged eight from Shepshed Dynamo Warriors. After impressing for the under-18, he was promoted to the under-23 in March 2017. He signed his first professional contract with the club in June, a two-year deal. In 2019, he was named as the Development Squad Player of the Year.

==== 2020–2021: Loans to Blackpool and Luton ====
Dewsbury-Hall made his first-team debut in a 1–0 FA Cup victory over Brentford on 25 January 2020, coming on as a substitute for Kelechi Iheanacho. Two days later, he joined Blackpool on loan for the rest of the 2019–20 season, stating, "It's very important for me to go and get some game-time, I think I'm ready for men's football." He scored a consolation goal on his debut the following day in a 2–1 away defeat to Wycombe Wanderers, after replacing Grant Ward at half-time. Dewsbury-Hall impressed for Blackpool, although the season was cut short due to the COVID-19 pandemic. He finished his loan with 10 appearances and 4 goals.

"Who recruited him? Great recruitment. That's all I can say. He's doing what we thought he'd do, an outstanding young player, one we're very happy to have."

— Luton manager Nathan Jones on Dewsbury-Hall.

Dewsbury-Hall was handed his first start for Leicester on 23 September 2020, in a 2–0 defeat to Arsenal in the EFL Cup. On 16 October, he signed a new four-year contract with Leicester and joined Championship side Luton Town on a season-long loan. He made his Luton and Championship debut on 24 October, in a 1–0 win over Sheffield Wednesday. His first goal for Luton came on 29 December to defeat Bristol City 2–1. He won Luton Player of the Month three times in a row, from November to January, and won it for the fourth time for April/May. At the end of the season, he won four awards at Luton's awards ceremony, including Players' Player of the Season. In total, Dewsbury-Hall made 40 appearances and scored 3 times during his loan at Luton.

==== 2021–2023: First-team breakthrough ====
Dewsbury-Hall won the FA Community Shield with Leicester City on 7 August 2021, after coming on as a substitute for Ayoze Pérez and defeating Manchester City 1–0. He made his Premier League debut on 28 August, coming on as a substitute for James Maddison in a 2–1 away win at Norwich City. He made his Premier League full debut on 5 December, in a 2–1 defeat to Aston Villa. On 10 December, he scored his first goal for Leicester City, in a 3–2 defeat at Napoli in a Europa League group stage match. He scored his first Premier League goal on 10 April 2022, in a 2–1 home win against Crystal Palace. He won the Leicester 2021–22 Young Player of the Season award and was also inducted into the UEFA Europa Conference League Team of the Season, after making 12 appearances and scoring twice in the competition. On 24 June 2022, Dewsbury-Hall signed a new long term contract with Leicester City lasting until 2027. He scored on the opening day of the 2022–23 season on 7 August, in a 2–2 draw to Brentford. He was sent off after receiving two yellow cards on 4 April 2023 in a 2–1 defeat to Aston Villa. He ended the season with 34 appearances and scored twice, but Leicester City were relegated at the end of the season.

==== 2023–24 season ====
On 6 August 2023, in the opening game of the 2023–24 season, he scored twice against Coventry City, winning the match for Leicester in the 87th minute. Being a mainstay in Enzo Maresca's side, Dewsbury-Hall guided his team back to the Premier League by winning the Championship. He won Leicester's Players' Player of the Season and Men's Player of the Season awards. He was also included in the EFL Championship Team of the Season and PFA Team of the Year, after scoring 12 goals and providing a further 14 assists in 44 matches.

=== Chelsea ===
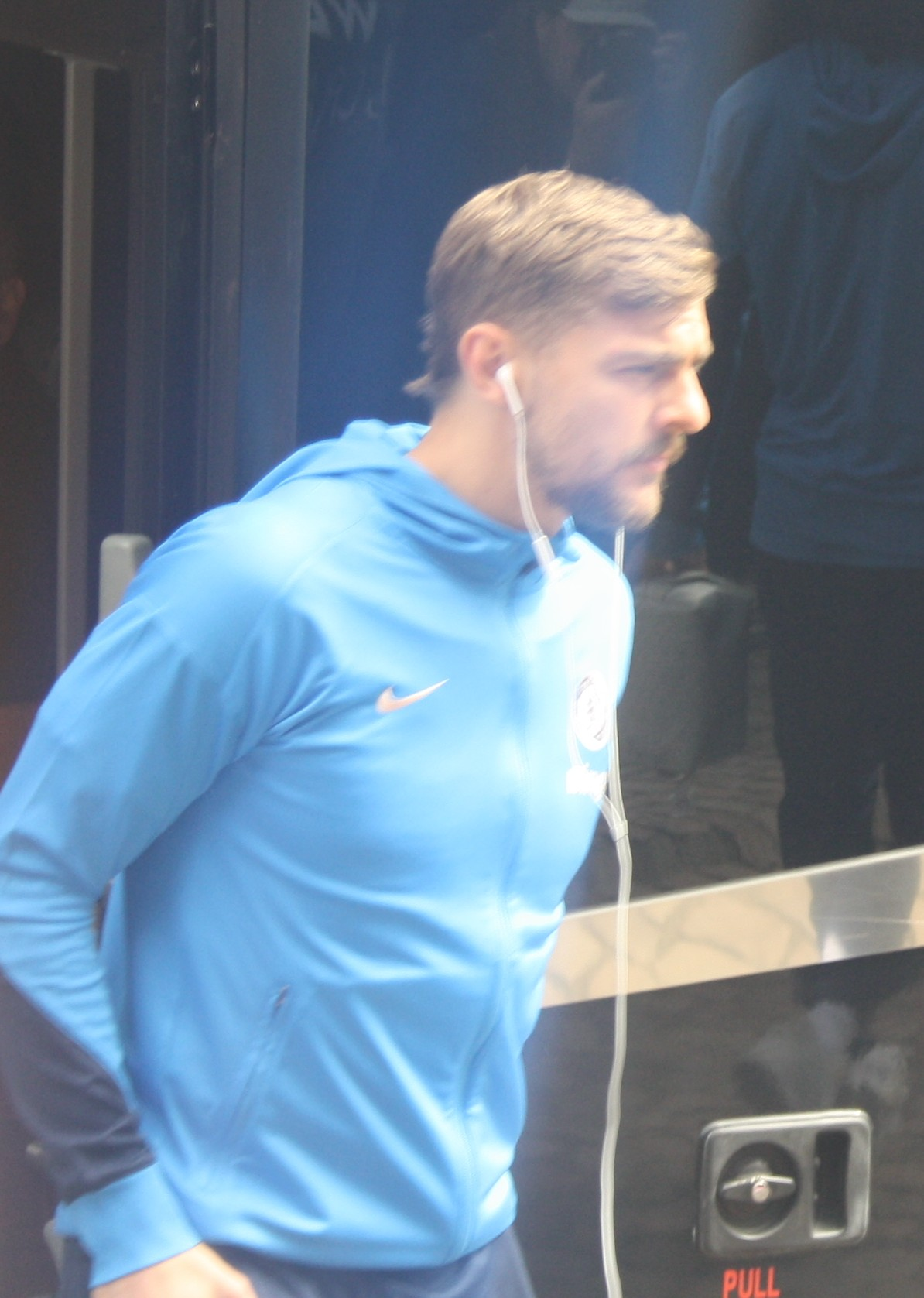
Dewsbury-Hall with Chelsea in 2025

On 2 July 2024, Dewsbury-Hall joined club Chelsea for a reported fee of £30 million. The move reunited Dewsbury-Hall with former Leicester City manager Enzo Maresca, who made the switch to Chelsea earlier in that summer. On 18 August, he made his debut for the club, as a substitute, in a 2–0 loss against Manchester City in the league. His first start for Chelsea came on 22 August, in a 2–0 Conference League win over Servette. He scored his first goal in the same competition on 3 October, in a 4–2 win over Gent. On 20 January 2025, he made his full league debut for Chelsea in a 3–1 win over Wolverhampton Wanderers.

Dewsbury-Hall was the only player to feature in all 15 matches in Chelsea's successful 2024–25 UEFA Europa Conference League campaign, starting in 13 of them. He contributed four goals and three assists, including setting up Jadon Sancho's goal in the 4–1 final victory over Real Betis in Wrocław.

Dewsbury-Hall was a part of Chelsea's victorious squad for the 2025 FIFA Club World Cup. On 29 June, he scored the fourth goal in Chelsea's 4–1 defeat of Benfica in the round of 16.

=== Everton ===
On 6 August 2025, Dewsbury-Hall joined Everton for an undisclosed fee, reported to be worth £29 million. On 18 August 2025, Dewsbury-Hall made his Everton debut in a 1–0 loss away to newly-promoted Leeds United.

On Everton's first game of the 2026–27 Premier League season, Dewsbury-Hall scored Everton's first goal of the campaign against Crystal Palace.

== Style of play ==
Dewsbury-Hall is known for his box-to-box style of play, covering large areas of the pitch. He has strong passing skills, good ball control, and contributes both defensively with effective tackling and offensively by creating opportunities. His high stamina allows him to press opponents and recover the ball consistently.

== International career ==
Although Dewsbury-Hall was born in England, he is eligible to play for the Republic of Ireland national team through family heritage. Despite not yet receiving an England cap, Dewsbury-Hall has consistently downplayed rumours that he was considering switching allegiance. He has stated "I respect Ireland and I respect the Irish people but I'm English. To play for England for me would be the biggest achievement of my career ... It would be the proudest moment of my life if I played for England."

== Career statistics ==
As of match played 6 November 2026

Appearances and goals by club, season and competition
Club	Season	League			FA Cup		EFL Cup		Europe		Other		Total	
Club	Season	Division	Apps	Goals	Apps	Goals	Apps	Goals	Apps	Goals	Apps	Goals	Apps	Goals
Leicester City U21	2017–18	—			—		—		—		3 (Note: Appearances in EFL Trophy)	0	3	0
Leicester City U21	2018–19	—			—		—		—		3	0	3	0
Leicester City U21	2019–20	—			—		—		—		5	2	5	2
Leicester City U21	Total		—		—		—		—		11	2	11	2
Leicester City	2019–20	Premier League	0	0	1	0	0	0	—		—		1	0
Leicester City	2020–21	Premier League	0	0	—		1	0	—		—		1	0
Leicester City	2021–22	Premier League	28	1	1	0	3	0	11 (Note: Four appearances and one goal in UEFA Europa League, seven appearances and one goal in UEFA Europa Conference League)	2	1 (Note: Appearance in FA Community Shield)	0	44	3
Leicester City	2022–23	Premier League	31	2	2	0	1	0	—		—		34	2
Leicester City	2023–24	Championship	44	12	2	0	3	0	—		—		49	12
Leicester City	Total		103	15	6	0	8	0	11	2	1	0	129	17
Blackpool (loan)	2019–20	League One	10	4	—		—		—		—		10	4
Luton Town (loan)	2020–21	Championship	39	3	1	0	—		—		—		40	3
Chelsea	2024–25	Premier League	13	0	1	0	2	0	15 (Note: Appearances in UEFA Conference League)	4	5 (Note: Appearances in FIFA Club World Cup)	1	36	5
Everton	2025–26	Premier League	31	8	0	0	1	0	—		—		32	8
Everton	2026–27	Premier League	10	3	0	0	3	0	—		—		13	3
Everton	Total		41	11	0	0	4	0	—		—		45	11
Career total			206	33	8	0	14	0	26	6	17	3	271	42

== Honours ==
Leicester City

- EFL Championship: 2023–24
- FA Community Shield: 2021

Chelsea

- UEFA Conference League: 2024–25
- FIFA Club World Cup: 2025

Individual

- UEFA Europa Conference League Team of the Season: 2021–22
- EFL Championship Team of the Season: 2023–24
- Leicester City Supporters' Player of the Season: 2023–24
- Leicester City Players' Player of the Season: 2023–24
- PFA Team of the Year: 2023–24 Championship
- The Athletic Championship Player of the Season: 2023–24
- The Athletic Championship Team of the Season: 2023–24
