= 2025 Premier League Summer Series =

Tournament details
- Host country: United States
- Dates: July 26 – August 3
- Teams: 4 (from 1 confederation)
- Venues: 3 (in 3 host cities)

Final positions
- Champions: Manchester United (1st title)
- Runners-up: West Ham United
- Third place: Bournemouth
- Fourth place: Everton

Tournament statistics
- Matches played: 6
- Goals scored: 20 (3.33 per match)
- Top scorer(s): Bruno Fernandes (3 goals)

The 2025 Premier League Summer Series was the second edition of the Premier League Summer Series, a friendly pre-season tournament organised by the English Premier League in the United States.

Manchester United were crowned champions of the tournament with two wins and one draw in three matches.

== Format ==
The four invited Premier League teams (Bournemouth, Everton, Manchester United and West Ham United) each played three matches, never facing the same opposition more than once. Teams were awarded three points for a win, one for a draw and zero for a loss. Following the conclusion of the tournament, the club with the most points was named the winner of the Premier League Summer Series. If multiple teams were tied on points, their position in the table was determined based on superior goal difference, then number of goals scored, and then results of head-to-head matches.

== Venues ==
East Rutherford, New Jersey	Chicago, Illinois	Atlanta, Georgia	Location of the host cities of the 2025 Premier League Summer Series.
MetLife Stadium	Soldier Field	Mercedes-Benz Stadium	Location of the host cities of the 2025 Premier League Summer Series.
Capacity: 82,500	Capacity: 61,500	Capacity: 71,000	Location of the host cities of the 2025 Premier League Summer Series.

== Standings ==
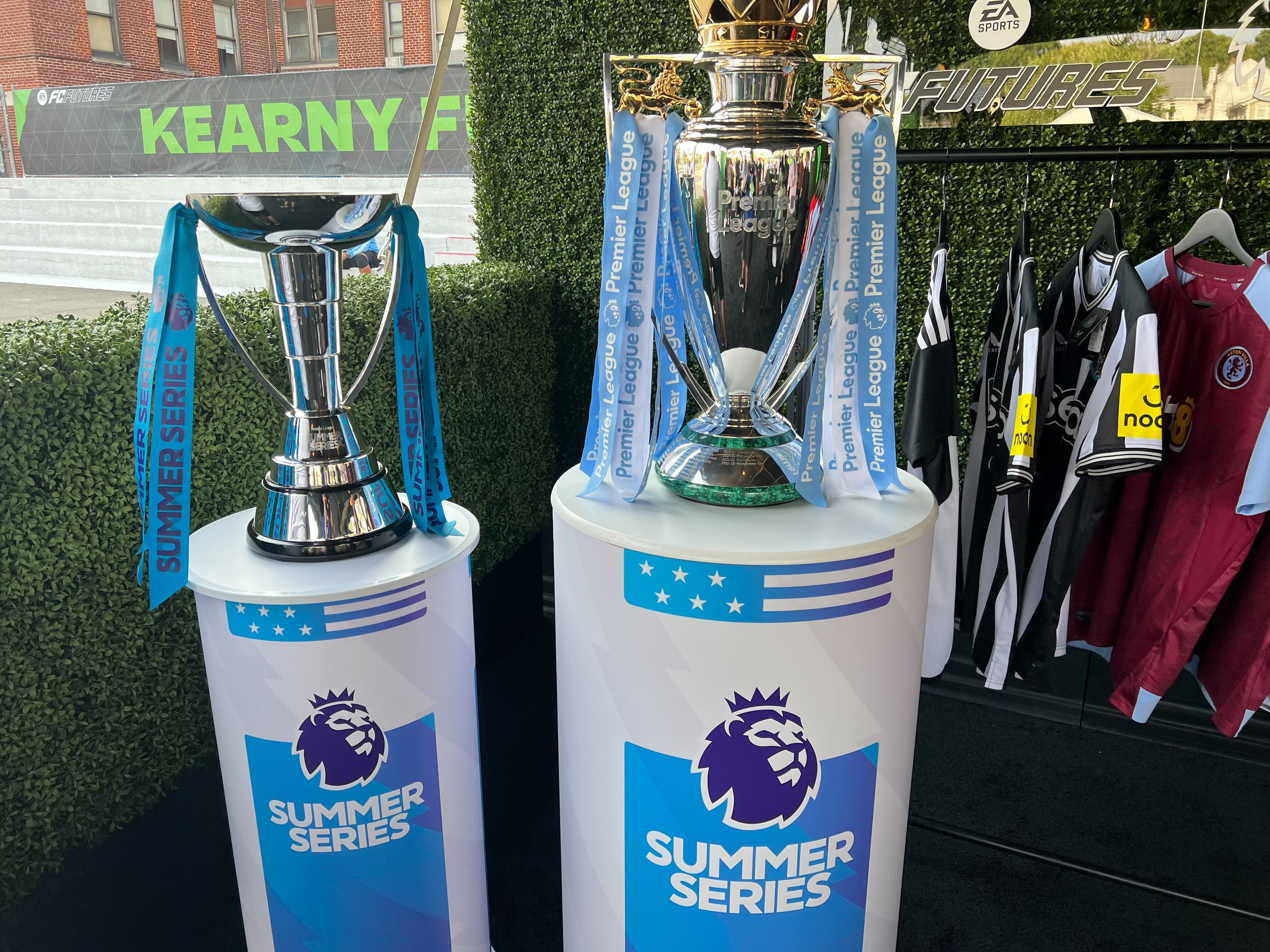
The Premier League Summer Series trophy (left) and Premier League trophy (right) on display during an event in Kearny, New Jersey.

Pos	Team	Pld	W	D	L	GF	GA	GD	Pts	Final result
1	Manchester United (C)	3	2	1	0	8	4	+4	7	2025 Premier League Summer Series winners
2	West Ham United	3	2	0	1	5	3	+2	6	
3	Bournemouth	3	1	0	2	4	6	−2	3	
4	Everton	3	0	1	2	3	7	−4	1	

Source: Premier League
Rules for classification: 1) Points; 2) Goal difference; 3) Goals scored; 4) Head-to-head result; 5) Fair play ranking.
(C) Champions

== Results ==
All times are EST.

=== Matchday 1 ===
July 26, 2025
16:00

Everton	0–3	Bournemouth
	Report	Billing 55'; Ouattara 59'; Adu-Adjei 69'

MetLife Stadium, East Rutherford, New Jersey
Attendance: 10,000
Referee: Guido Gonzales Jr.
July 26, 2025
19:00

Manchester United	2–1	West Ham United
Fernandes 5' (pen.), 52'	Report	Bowen 63'

MetLife Stadium, East Rutherford, New Jersey
Attendance: 82,566
Referee: Thomas Bramall

=== Matchday 2 ===
July 30, 2025
18:30

West Ham United	2–1	Everton
Paquetá 41'; Füllkrug 64'	Report	Gueye 17'

Soldier Field, Chicago, Illinois
Attendance: 58,927
Referee: Rosendo Mendoza
July 30, 2025
21:30

Manchester United	4–1	Bournemouth
Højlund 8'; Dorgu 25'; Amad 53'; Williams 72'	Report	De Ligt 88' (o.g.)

Soldier Field, Chicago, Illinois
Attendance: 58,927
Referee: Lewis Smith

=== Matchday 3 ===
August 3, 2025
14:30

Bournemouth	0–2	West Ham United
	Report	Füllkrug 24'; Bowen 67'

Mercedes-Benz Stadium, Atlanta, Georgia
Referee: Victor Rivas
August 3, 2025
17:00

Manchester United	2–2	Everton
Fernandes 19' (pen.); Mount 69'	Report	Ndiaye 40'; Heaven 75' (o.g.)

Mercedes-Benz Stadium, Atlanta, Georgia
Referee: Thomas Bramall
