= Iliman Ndiaye =

Senegalese footballer (born 2000)

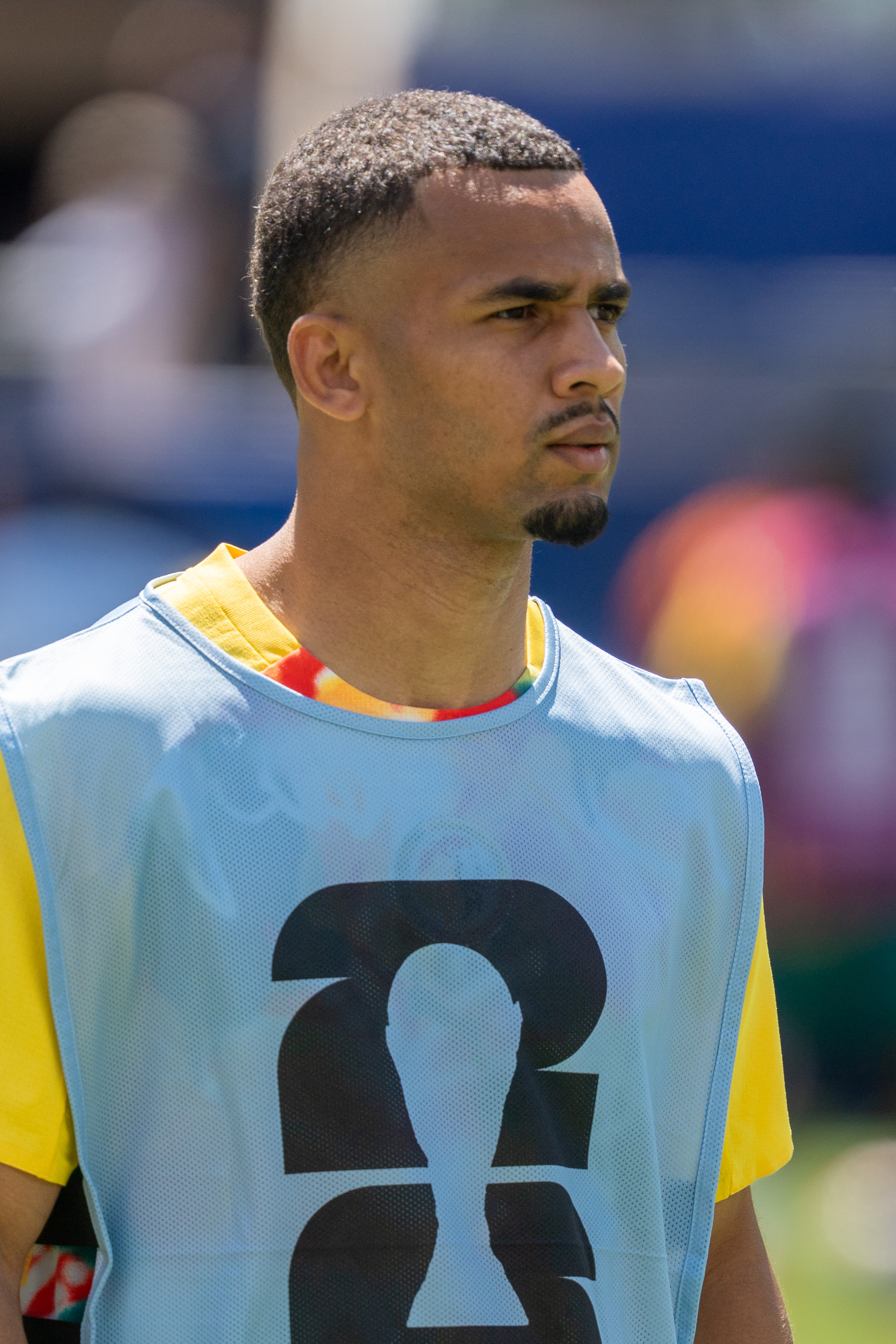
- Ndiaye with Senegal in 2026

Personal information
- Full name: Iliman Cheikh Baroy Ndiaye
- Date of birth: 6 March 2000 (age 26)
- Place of birth: Rouen, France
- Height: 1.80 m (5 ft 11 in)
- Position: Winger

Team information
- Current team: Manchester City
- Number: 7

Youth career
- 2005–2009: Rouen Sapins
- 2009–2011: Rouen
- 2011–2012: Marseille
- 2014–2016: Dakar Sacré-Cœur
- 2016–2019: Boreham Wood

Senior career*
Years	Team	Apps	(Gls)
2019–2023	Sheffield United	77	(21)
2020	→ Hyde United (loan)	6	(1)
2023–2024	Marseille	30	(3)
2024–2026	Everton	67	(15)
2026–	Manchester City	9	(0)

International career^{‡}
2022–	Senegal	47	(6)
Medal record
Men's football
Representing Senegal
Africa Cup of Nations
Runner-up	2025 Morocco
- * Club domestic league appearances and goals as of 16:40, 7 November 2026 (UTC) ‡ National team caps and goals as of 17:00, 16 November 2026 (UTC)

Iliman Cheikh Baroy Ndiaye (born 6 March 2000) is a professional footballer who plays as a winger for Premier League club Manchester City. Born in France, he plays for the Senegal national team.

== Club career ==
=== Early career ===
Ndiaye began playing football with the French clubs Rouen Sapins, Rouen, and Marseille before moving to Senegal with Dakar Sacré-Cœur. His father moved to England and Ndiaye joined him where he joined the youth side of Boreham Wood, also playing Sunday League matches with Rising Ballers to keep fit, in addition to representing his school Westminster Academy. In November 2017, Ndiaye signed his first contract with Boreham Wood.

=== Sheffield United ===
On 31 August 2019, Ndiaye signed with Sheffield United. He joined Hyde United on loan for the latter half of the 2019–20 season. He made his professional debut with Sheffield United as a late substitute in a 5–0 Premier League loss to Leicester City on 14 March 2021. On his full Sheffield United debut, he scored twice against Peterborough United on 11 September in a 6–2 win. On 3 March 2023 in the FA Cup, he scored in the 79th minute against Tottenham Hotspur to secure a 1–0 victory and ensure Sheffield United's place in the quarter-finals.

=== Marseille ===
On 1 August 2023, Ndiaye signed for Ligue 1 club Marseille, one of his former youth clubs. The transfer fee was a reported £20 million. He made his debut on 12 August in a 2–1 win against Reims.

=== Everton ===
On 3 July 2024, Premier League club Everton announced the signing of Ndiaye on a five-year deal for an undisclosed fee. His debut goal for the club was against Doncaster Rovers in the second round of the EFL Cup.

On 18 May 2025, Ndiaye scored the last goals for Everton at Goodison Park, scoring both goals against Southampton in a 2–0 win for the Toffees. He was also subsequently named Man of the Match. Later that year, on 24 August, he scored the first goal for Everton at Hill Dickinson Stadium in the Premier League, in a 2–0 victory against Brighton & Hove Albion.

=== Manchester City ===
On 1 September 2026, Ndiaye signed for fellow Premier League club Manchester City for a reported base fee of £60 million. He made his debut for the club in a 1–0 home victory against Coventry City on 5 September.

== International career ==
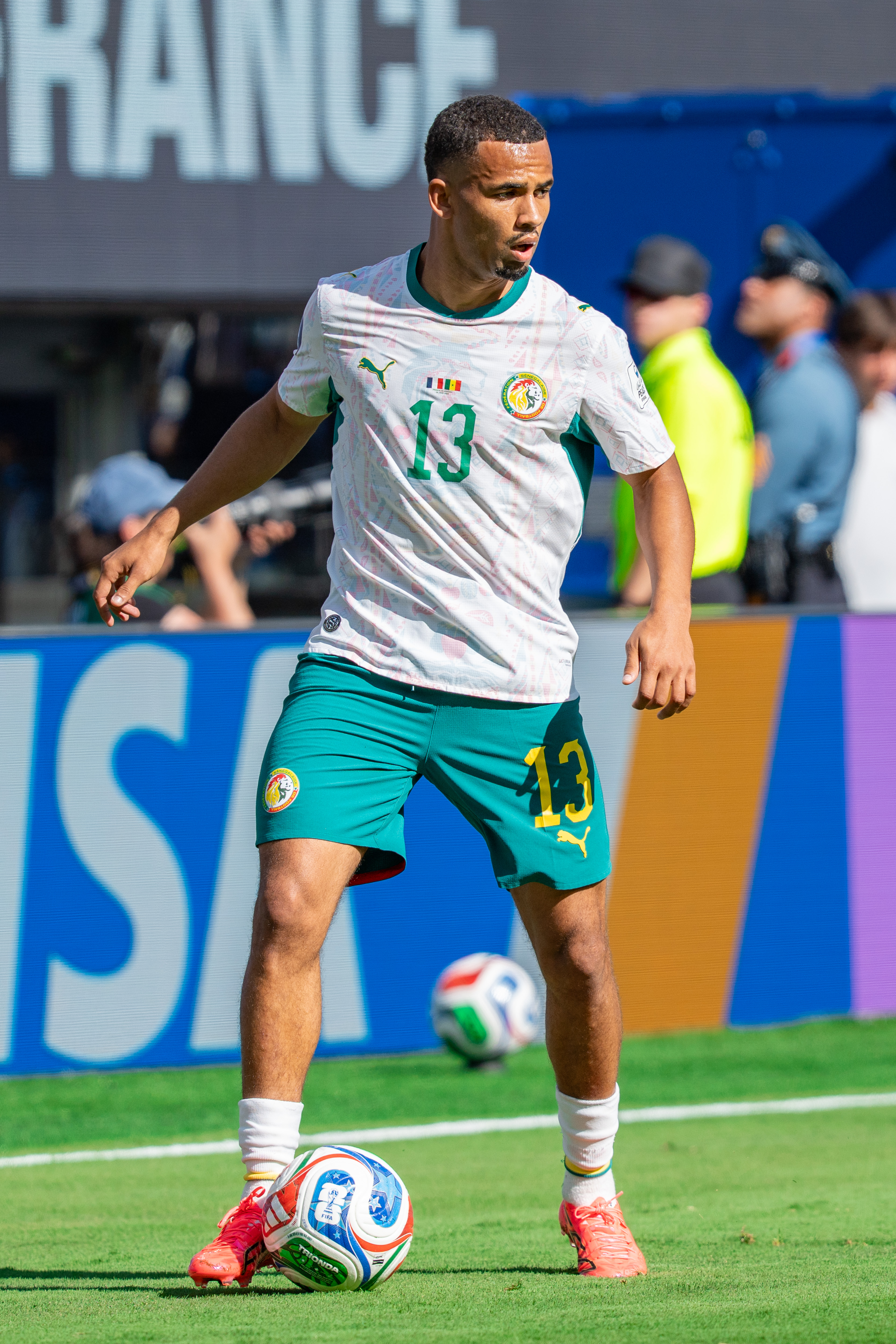
Ndiaye with Senegal at the 2026 FIFA World Cup

Ndiaye was born in France to a Senegalese father and French mother. He debuted with the Senegal national team in a 3–1 2023 Africa Cup of Nations qualification win over Benin in the 67th minute when he was substituted on for Boulaye Dia on 4 June 2022.

In November 2022, Ndiaye was named in the final squad for the 2022 FIFA World Cup in Qatar. He appeared as a substitute in Senegal's second group match, assisting Bamba Dieng's goal as the team beat hosts Qatar 3–1. He went on to start the team's third group match against Ecuador and round of 16 loss to England.

On 24 March 2023, Ndiaye scored his first international goal in a 5–1 victory against Mozambique during an Africa Cup of Nations qualifier. In December 2023, he was named in Senegal's squad for the postponed 2023 Africa Cup of Nations held in the Ivory Coast. He appeared as a substitute in all four of the team's matches, assisting Lamine Camara's second goal in the opening 3–0 win over The Gambia and scoring the second goal of a 2–0 win against Guinea in the final group match.

In 2025, Ndiaye was named to the Senegal squad for the 2025 Africa Cup of Nations held in Morocco. Ndiaye appeared in all seven games of Senegal's campaign, and scored the only goal in their quarter-final win against Mali.

On 21 May 2026, Ndiaye was officially selected by Senegal's coach Pape Thiaw from his list of 28 players to participate in the 2026 FIFA World Cup. A month later, on 26 June, he scored his first World Cup goal and provided an assist in a 5–0 victory over Iraq, helping Senegal confirm qualification to the knockout stage.

== Career statistics ==
=== Club ===
As of match played 4 November 2026

Appearances and goals by club, season and competition
Club	Season	League			National cup (Note: Includes FA Cup)		League cup (Note: Includes EFL Cup)		Europe		Other		Total	
Club	Season	Division	Apps	Goals	Apps	Goals	Apps	Goals	Apps	Goals	Apps	Goals	Apps	Goals
Sheffield United	2019–20	Premier League	0	0	0	0	0	0	—		—		0	0
Sheffield United	2020–21	Premier League	1	0	0	0	0	0	—		—		1	0
Sheffield United	2021–22	Championship	30	7	1	0	2	0	—		2 (Note: Appearances in Championship play-offs)	0	35	7
Sheffield United	2022–23	Championship	46	14	6	1	0	0	—		—		52	15
Sheffield United	Total		77	21	7	1	2	0	—		2	0	88	22
Hyde United (loan)	2019–20	Northern Premier League Premier Division	6	1	—		—		—		3 (Note: Two appearances in Northern Premier League Challenge Cup, one appearance in Cheshire Senior Cup)	0	9	1
Marseille	2023–24	Ligue 1	30	3	0	0	—		16 (Note: Two appearances in UEFA Champions League, fourteen appearances and one goal in UEFA Europa League)	1	—		46	4
Everton	2024–25	Premier League	33	9	2	1	2	1	—		—		37	11
Everton	2025–26	Premier League	32	6	0	0	2	0	—		—		34	6
Everton	2026–27	Premier League	2	0	—		1	0	—		—		3	0
Everton	Total		67	15	2	1	5	1	—		—		74	17
Manchester City	2026–27	Premier League	8	0	0	0	0	0	3 (Note: Appearance in UEFA Champions League)	0	—		11	0
Career total			188	40	9	2	7	1	19	1	5	0	228	44

=== International ===
As of match played 16 November 2026

Appearances and goals by national team and year
National team	Year	Apps	Goals
Senegal	2022	5	0
Senegal	2023	6	1
Senegal	2024	15	1
Senegal	2025	10	1
Senegal	2026	11	3
Total		47	6

Senegal score listed first, score column indicates score after each Ndiaye goal.

List of international goals scored by Iliman Ndiaye
No.	Date	Venue	Opponent	Score	Result	Competition
1	24 March 2023	Diamniadio Olympic Stadium, Diamniadio, Senegal	Mozambique	3–0	5–1	2023 Africa Cup of Nations qualification
2	23 January 2024	Charles Konan Banny Stadium, Yamoussoukro, Ivory Coast	Guinea	2–0	2–0	2023 Africa Cup of Nations
3	14 October 2025	Diamniadio Olympic Stadium, Diamniadio, Senegal	Mauritania	3–0	4–0	2026 FIFA World Cup qualification
4	9 January 2026	Tangier Grand Stadium, Tangier, Morocco	Mali	1–0	1–0	2025 Africa Cup of Nations
5	26 June 2026	BMO Field, Toronto, Canada	Iraq	5–0	5–0	2026 FIFA World Cup
6	4 October 2026	Stade Vélodrome, Marseille, France	Comoros	1–0	1–0	Friendly

== Honours ==
Individual

- EFL Championship Team of the Season: 2022–23
- PFA Team of the Year: 2022–23 Championship
- Sheffield United Player of the Year: 2022–23
- Sheffield United Players' Player of the Year: 2022–23
- Everton Goal of the Season: 2025–26 (vs. Sunderland, 3 November 2025)
