= Jordan Pickford =

English footballer (born 1994)

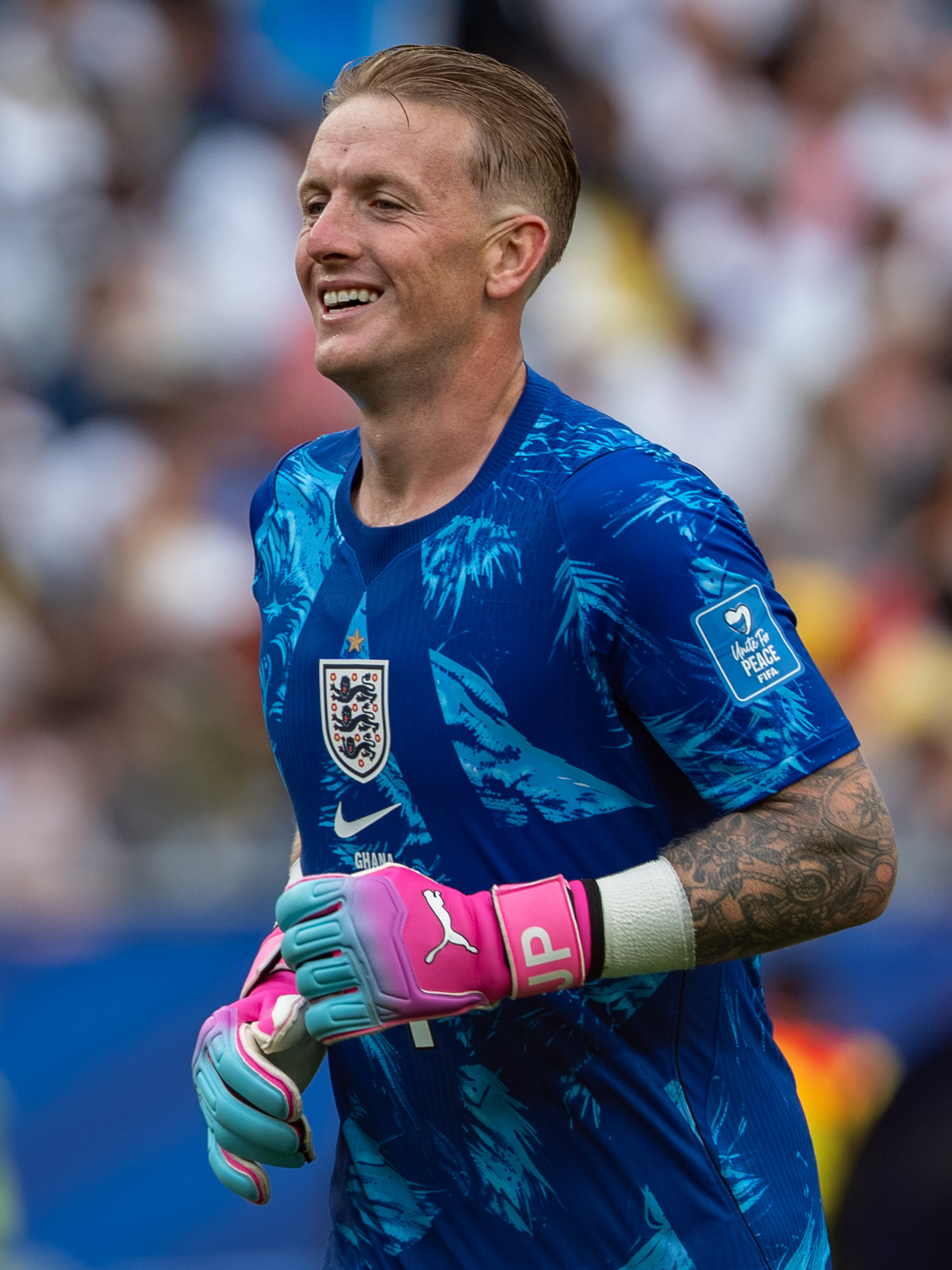
- Pickford with England in 2026

Personal information
- Full name: Jordan Lee Pickford
- Birth name: Jordan Lee Logan
- Date of birth: 7 March 1994 (age 32)
- Place of birth: Washington, Tyne and Wear, England
- Height: 6 ft 1 in (1.85 m)
- Position: Goalkeeper

Team information
- Current team: Everton
- Number: 1

Youth career
- 2002–2011: Sunderland

Senior career*
| Years | Team | Apps | (Gls) |
| 2011–2017 | Sunderland | 31 | (0) |
| 2012 | → Darlington (loan) | 17 | (0) |
| 2013 | → Alfreton Town (loan) | 12 | (0) |
| 2013 | → Burton Albion (loan) | 12 | (0) |
| 2014 | → Carlisle United (loan) | 18 | (0) |
| 2014–2015 | → Bradford City (loan) | 33 | (0) |
| 2015–2016 | → Preston North End (loan) | 24 | (0) |
| 2017– | Everton | 341 | (0) |

International career^{‡}
| 2009–2010 | England U16 | 5 | (0) |
| 2010–2011 | England U17 | 17 | (0) |
| 2010–2012 | England U18 | 3 | (0) |
| 2012–2013 | England U19 | 8 | (0) |
| 2015 | England U20 | 3 | (0) |
| 2015–2017 | England U21 | 14 | (0) |
| 2017– | England | 94 | (0) |
Medal record
Men's football
Representing England
FIFA World Cup
| Third place | 2026 Canada–Mexico–US |
UEFA European Championship
| Runner-up | 2020 Europe |
| Runner-up | 2024 Germany |
UEFA Nations League
| Third place | 2019 Portugal |
- * Club domestic league appearances and goals as of 22:10, 12 November 2026 (UTC) ‡ National team caps and goals as of 22:10, 12 November 2026 (UTC)

Jordan Lee Pickford (né Logan; born 7 March 1994) is an English professional footballer who plays as a goalkeeper for Premier League club Everton and the England national team.

Pickford began his career at Sunderland, and played for their academy, reserve and senior teams. He had loan spells at Darlington, Alfreton Town, Burton Albion, Carlisle United, Bradford City, and Preston North End. He signed for Everton for a fee of £30 million in June 2017.

Pickford has represented England at under-16, under-17, under-18, under-19, under-20, and under-21 levels. He made his debut for the full England national team in November 2017 in a friendly against Germany. He was the starting goalkeeper in England's 2018 FIFA World Cup fourth-place finish, in which the squad made its first semi-final appearance since 1990. He also started in England's UEFA Euro 2020 runners-up finish, in which they reached their first ever Euro final and first major tournament final since 1966. Starting every game in the group stage, Pickford conceded no goals. Pickford again started as England's first-choice goalkeeper as they reached the final of UEFA Euro 2024 and finished third at the 2026 FIFA World Cup.

== Early and personal life ==
Jordan Lee Pickford was born Jordan Lee Logan on 7 March 1994 in Washington, a town in the county of Tyne and Wear in England. His father Lee later changed the family name to Pickford. He attended St Robert of Newminster Catholic School. He grew up supporting his local football club, Sunderland.

Pickford began dating Megan Davison whilst at secondary school. In March 2020, they married. The couple have a son who was born in 2019, and two daughters born in 2023 and 2025.

He is not related to George Pickford, another goalkeeper at Everton who plays for the youth team.

=== 2026 driving offence case ===
In October 2026 Pickford pleaded guilty to driving without due care or attention after an incident in Cheshire in April 2026. Cheshire Police said he drove through a give-way junction, causing two cars to brake to avoid a collision, and continued along a road with a 30 mph speed limit. An officer pursued him and reported that Pickford’s car was pulling away while the officer was travelling at 50 mph.

Pickford pleaded guilty in writing and said he wished to attend court to present mitigation. His case was adjourned, with a further appearance scheduled at Chester Magistrates’ Court for 7 December 2026.

== Club career ==
=== Sunderland ===
Pickford joined Sunderland's Academy at the age of eight and progressed through the age groups before signing two-year scholarship terms in 2010. The following year, he was promoted from the Academy to the reserve team.

In 2011, Pickford signed his first professional contract with the club. The following year, he signed a contract extension with the club.

==== Loans to Darlington and Alfreton Town ====
Pickford signed on loan for Conference Premier club Darlington in time to make his debut against Fleetwood Town on 21 January 2012, playing the whole of a 1–0 home loss. The initial month-long loan was subsequently extended until the end of April. He went on to make 17 appearances for Darlington, who were relegated.

On 25 February 2013, Pickford signed for Conference Premier club Alfreton Town, again on an initial month-long loan and was a cover for Phil Barnes, who was injured. He made his debut the next day in a 5–1 win over Hyde United. His loan spell at the club was subsequently extended until the end of the season. During this spell, Pickford kept 5 clean sheets in 12 matches.

==== Loans to Burton Albion and Carlisle United ====
On 2 August 2013, Pickford signed another loan deal, this time with League Two club Burton Albion, and made his debut the next day against Cheltenham Town. However, his loan ended on 17 August, after Sunderland recalled him with Pickford featuring just three times for Burton. On 13 September, Pickford re-joined Burton on loan. His handful of first-team appearances at Burton Albion led to an extension of his loan spell for another month. After making 13 appearances across his two loan spells, Pickford was recalled by his parent club once again. He subsequently spent 11 matches as an unused substitute on the bench as a cover for Vito Mannone between 23 November 2013 and 18 January 2014.

Although it was rumoured that he could return on loan to Burton for the third time, Pickford joined League One club Carlisle United on a one-month loan on 8 February 2014. He made his debut that same day in a 2–1 loss away to Gillingham. His form and handful of first-team appearances led the club to keep him on loan for the rest of the season. After extending his loan at the club, Pickford went on to make 18 appearances for Carlisle.

At the end of the 2013–14 season, Pickford signed a four-year contract with Sunderland, keeping him at the club until 2018.

==== Loan to Bradford City ====
On 21 July 2014, Pickford joined League One club Bradford City on a season-long loan for the 2014–15 season. He made his debut on 9 August in a 3–2 win against Coventry City at Valley Parade, and kept his first clean sheet in the following match, a 0–0 draw away to Walsall. Pickford then received his first ever red card after he was sent off in the 11th minute of a 2–1 loss to Rochdale on 10 January 2015. He served a one-match suspension which his club did not appeal.

On 7 February, he was once again expelled from play as he was sent off in the last minute of a 2–2 away draw against Port Vale. After being given a two-match ban, the club successfully appealed and had it revoked.

Pickford established himself as a first-choice goalkeeper for most of the season until he was recalled by his parent club on 9 March 2015.

==== Loan to Preston North End ====
On 31 July 2015, Pickford joined Championship club Preston North End on a season-long loan for the 2015–16 season. He kept a clean sheet on his debut in a 0–0 draw against Middlesbrough at Deepdale.

Further clean sheets in a 1–0 win against Milton Keynes Dons in his second league appearance and a 0–0 draw with Rotherham United on 18 August made it three clean sheets from his first three league appearances for the club. On 25 August, Pickford kept another clean sheet as Preston defeated Premier League team Watford 1–0 in the League Cup. On 7 November, he recorded a 6th consecutive clean sheet in a 0–0 draw against QPR, equalling the club record. During his stint at Preston, Pickford impressed his veteran goalkeeping teammate Chris Kirkland, who said "Jordan comes out to take crosses and has an authority for someone still very young... As for his kicking, that is brilliant! I have never seen anyone kick a ball like he does." On 20 December 2015, Pickford was controversially sent off in a 1–0 defeat against Leeds United: he rushed out of his box to challenge striker Chris Wood, and was judged to have handled the ball. Preston successfully appealed the decision, using replay footage that showed the ball hitting his chest.

==== Return to Sunderland ====
On 1 January 2016, Pickford was recalled by Sunderland, with the side struggling in 19th place in the Premier League. He made his first-team debut on 9 January 2016, in a 3–1 FA Cup loss to Arsenal. He made his Premier League debut against Tottenham Hotspur at White Hart Lane on 16 January 2016 losing 4–1, meaning he had played in the top five leagues of English football by the age of 21. On 26 January, Pickford signed a new contract committing his future to Sunderland until 2020.

Pickford began the 2016–17 season as understudy to Vito Mannone. However, after Mannone suffered a serious arm injury in training, Pickford started Sunderland's third league match of the season, away to Southampton. He produced several saves during the match, but in the 85th minute he made an error that allowed Jay Rodriguez to equalise for the hosts in a 1–1 draw. On 13 April 2017, Pickford was named as one of six players shortlisted for the PFA Young Player of the Year award.

=== Everton ===
==== 2017–18 season ====
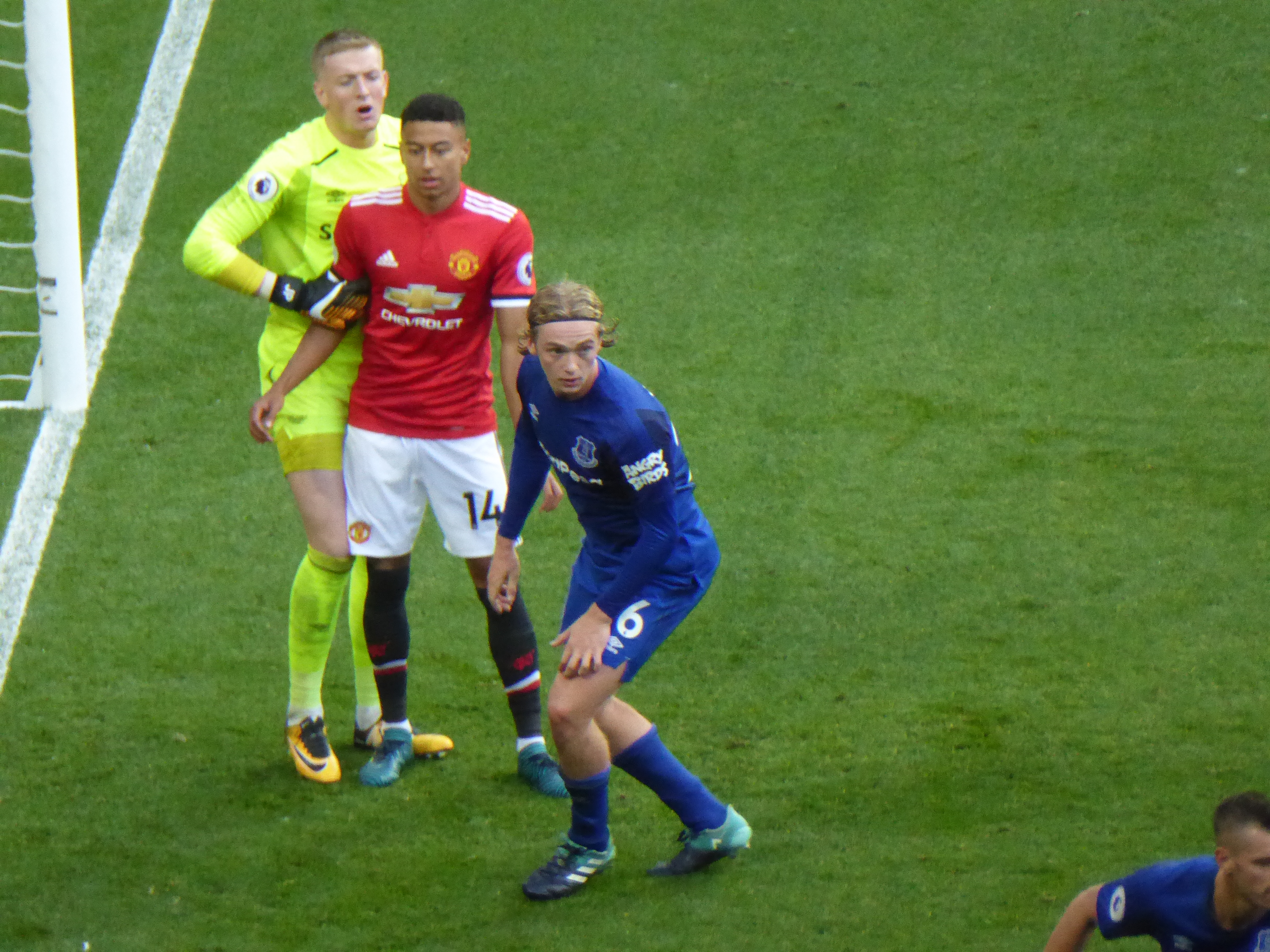
Pickford (left, in yellow) playing for Everton in 2017

On 15 June 2017, Pickford signed for Premier League club Everton on a five-year contract. The initial fee of £25 million, with the possibility of rising to £30 million in add-ons, made him the third most expensive goalkeeper in history at the time, the most expensive British goalkeeper of all time and will make him Everton's second most expensive signing, pending add-on payments, as Gylfi Sigurðsson is currently the club's most expensive signing with £40 million plus add-on payments. Pickford made his league debut for Everton on 12 August, when his team beat Stoke City 1–0 at Goodison Park. At the conclusion of his first season, he was named Everton's Player of the Season, along with numerous other club accolades.

==== 2018–19 season ====
On 2 December 2018, against local rivals Liverpool, Pickford made a last-minute mistake after he mishandled a volley from Virgil van Dijk, allowing Divock Origi to score the winning goal for Liverpool from a close-range header in the 96th minute.

On 10 March 2019, against Newcastle United, Pickford misjudged a cross from Matt Ritchie and then rugby tackled Salomón Rondón, conceding a penalty. He quickly redeemed himself by saving Ritchie's penalty with his legs, and Everton doubled their lead a minute later. In the second half, when an effort by Rondón went wide of the post, Pickford was seen smiling at the Newcastle fans in the Gallowgate end. However, he conceded three times after that, including parrying a shot by Miguel Almirón into the path of Ayoze Pérez. On Match of the Day, Ian Wright suggested that Pickford should have focused on his game more, and given he was a former Sunderland player, not let his emotions affect him. In April 2019 Pickford was allegedly filmed involved in a fracas; police said they would investigate.

==== 2019–20 season ====
Pickford remained Everton's first choice goalkeeper, making 38 appearances in the Premier League and keeping 13 clean sheets.

However, he struggled with form and again made several errors. His record of four errors leading to goals was the highest of any keeper in the Premier League. When it came to saving shots, only Chelsea's Kepa Arrizabalaga saved fewer than Pickford. Despite this, Carlo Ancelotti remained steadfast in his support for Pickford, saying "Sometimes unfortunately you can have a mistake but after that you need to have the personality to move on quickly and he did."

However, he performed much better in the EFL Cup, being part of the team that made the Quarter-Finals of the competition, including saving a penalty from Leicester City's James Maddison. It was however not enough and Leicester progressed through after the penalty shoot-out.

==== 2020–21 season ====
Pickford again continued to be Everton's first choice goalkeeper, being part of the team that won its opening four games for the first time since the 1969–70 season.

In the first Merseyside derby of the season, Pickford was criticised for his tackle on Liverpool's Virgil van Dijk which resulted in the defender being substituted after six minutes, with what later turned out to be a season-ending anterior cruciate ligament (ACL) injury. The derby was one of the most heated in recent years, with Richarlison being sent off for a late challenge on Thiago Alcantara and captain Jordan Henderson having a game-winning goal ruled out for offside by VAR.

==== 2021–22 season ====
On 25 May 2022, Pickford claimed the Player of the Season award from Everton following a personally outstanding campaign. On 28 May 2022, Pickford claimed the 2021–22 Castrol Save of the Season award for his excellent goal line stop against Chelsea. After Mason Mount's shot had hit both posts, Pickford raced across his line and then dived in the opposite direction to keep out César Azpilicueta's rebound as Everton beat Chelsea 1–0 on 1 May 2022.

==== 2022–present ====
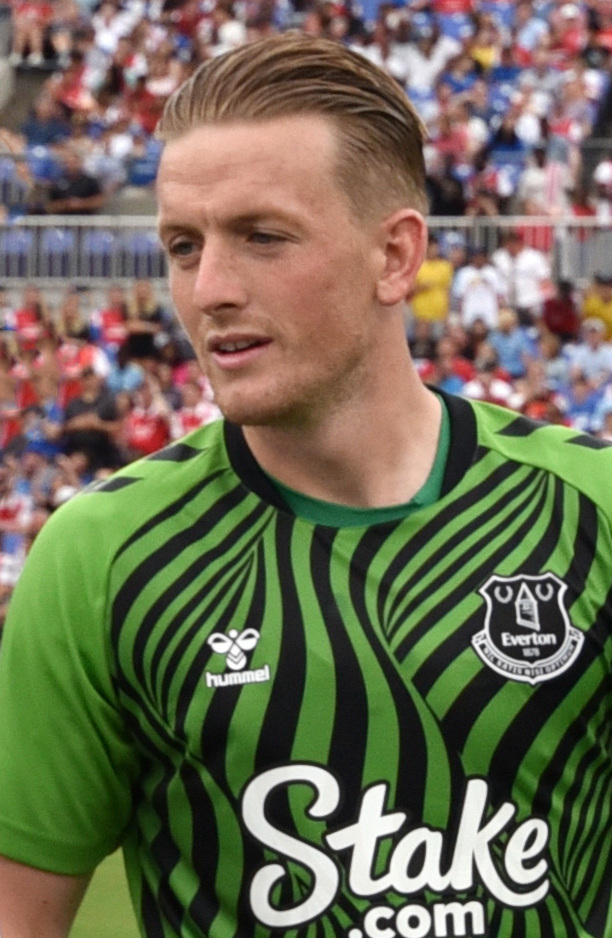
Pickford with Everton in 2022

Pickford kept his first clean sheet of the 2022–23 season on 3 September 2022, in the Merseyside derby draw at Goodison Park. He was praised for his performance in the match by BBC Sport's chief football writer Phil McNulty, who said that "Pickford's status as England's first choice goalkeeper is unquestioned and fully deserved" ahead of the 2022 FIFA World Cup. He signed a new contract with Everton on 24 February 2023, keeping him at the club until June 2027.

At the end of the 2023–24 season, Pickford was named as the Everton Player of the Season for his third consecutive season with the club.

On 16 October 2025, Pickford signed a new four-year-contract, committing his future to the club until 2029.

On 12 September 2026, Pickford kept his 100th Premier League clean sheet in a 0–0 draw against Tottenham Hotspur at Tottenham Hotspur Stadium, becoming the fifth English goalkeeper to reach this milestone.

== International career ==
=== Youth ===
Pickford has represented the England international team at every level from under-16s to under-21s. In October 2009, he made his England U16 debut against Wales U16. In 2011, Pickford represented England at the 2011 FIFA U-17 World Cup. In a game versus Canada, Pickford allowed an 86th-minute goal, from a downfield kick by Canadian goalkeeper Quillan Roberts which tied the game in a 2–2 draw. This remains as the only goal scored by a goalkeeper in a FIFA finals to date from open play.

On 25 August 2015, he was called up to the England under-21 squad for the first time. Pickford made his debut for the under-21s in a friendly against the United States under-23s at Deepdale on 3 September 2015.

On 13 October 2015, Pickford assisted Nathan Redmond's goal in the England U21s' 3–0 victory over Kazakhstan at the Ricoh Arena with a long range pass from his own penalty area. His team won the 2016 Toulon Tournament, their first in 22 years.

On 9 October 2016, Pickford received his first call-up to the senior squad, replacing an injured Tom Heaton for the 2018 FIFA World Cup qualifier against Slovenia.

Pickford led the England under-21 to the semi-final of the 2017 UEFA European Under-21 Championship in June 2017 with a string of strong performances.

=== Senior team ===
On 24 August 2017, Pickford was called up to the England squad by manager Gareth Southgate for two 2018 FIFA World Cup qualifiers against Malta and Slovakia. However, he later withdrew from the squad due to injury. Pickford made his debut in a friendly on 10 November 2017, starting as England drew 0–0 with Germany at Wembley Stadium.

==== 2018 FIFA World Cup ====
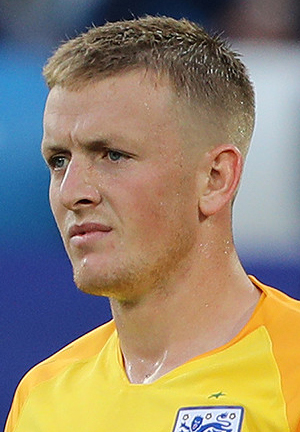
Pickford with England at the 2018 FIFA World Cup

Pickford was named in the 23-man England national team squad for the 2018 FIFA World Cup. He started the opening match against Tunisia, which England won 2–1. In their round of 16 match on 3 July, Pickford helped England beat Colombia 4–3 on penalties after a 1–1 draw, saving from Carlos Bacca, to claim his nation's first World Cup penalty shoot-out victory and a place in the quarter-final.

On 7 July 2018, Pickford kept his first clean sheet of the World Cup and was named man of the match, as England knocked out Sweden with a 2–0 win in the quarter-finals. The result earned England a place in the semi-finals of the World Cup for the first time since 1990.

==== 2019 UEFA Nations League ====
In June 2019, Pickford scored and then saved the decisive penalty as England beat Switzerland to finish third at the inaugural UEFA Nations League Finals. It was the second penalty shoot-out in a row that England had won, with Pickford saving penalties in both, and he became the first goalkeeper to take (and score) a penalty in a competitive shoot-out for England.

==== UEFA Euro 2020 ====
On 1 June 2021, Pickford was named in the 26-man squad for the rescheduled UEFA Euro 2020. At the tournament, Pickford became the first goalkeeper in history to keep clean sheets in the first five games of a European Championship. On 7 July 2021, Pickford set an all-time England record for most consecutive scoreless minutes posted by a goalkeeper. He set the mark of 721 minutes midway through the first half Euro 2020 semi-final against Denmark, passing a record previously held by Gordon Banks (720 minutes). On 11 July 2021, Pickford saved two Italy penalties during the shoot-out in the final, after the match finished 1–1 after extra time. However, England lost 3–2 after missing their last three penalties.

==== 2022 FIFA World Cup ====
Pickford was selected for England's 26-man squad on 10 November 2022 for the 2022 FIFA World Cup. He played in every minute of England's campaign and kept three clean sheets. The first two were in the group stage games against the USA (0–0) and Wales (3–0), as England topped Group B. He also kept out Senegal in England's 3–0 Round of 16 win. Pickford won his 50th cap in England's 2–1 quarter-final defeat to France.

==== UEFA Euro 2024 ====
On 6 June 2024, Pickford was named in England's squad for UEFA Euro 2024. He started the team's opening match of the tournament against Serbia, keeping a clean sheet in the 1–0 win to record his tenth shutout for England in a major international tournament, equaling Peter Shilton's record. On 25 June, he became the outright record holder with his eleventh clean sheet in the 0–0 draw against Slovenia.

After the Euro 2024 quarter-final against Switzerland went to a penalty shootout, Pickford saved the first kick from Manuel Akanji, the only unsuccessful kick of the shootout as England won 5–3. In the final of the tournament, England were defeated 2–1 by Spain.

==== 2026 FIFA World Cup ====
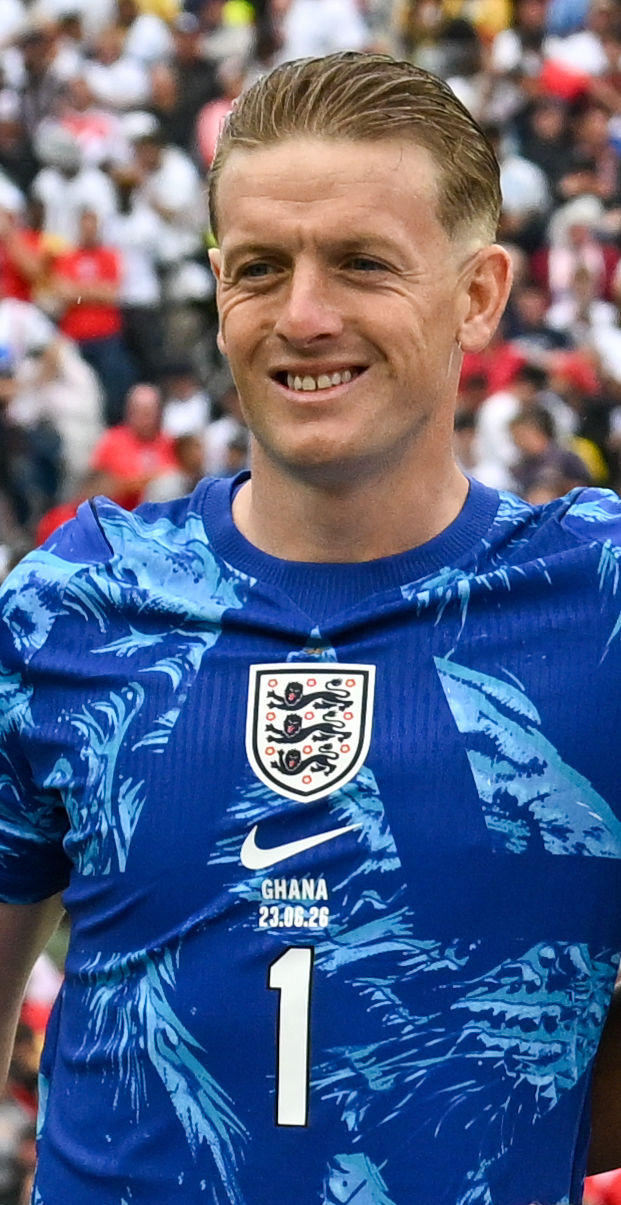
Pickford with England at the 2026 FIFA World Cup

On 22 May 2026, Pickford was selected in the 26-man squad for the 2026 FIFA World Cup. A month later, on 27 June, he made his 15th World Cup appearance in a 2–0 victory over Panama, becoming England's second-most capped player in World Cup history, only behind Peter Shilton with 17. He became England's joint-most capped player at the World Cup during a 3–2 victory over host nation Mexico in the Round of 16. He made his record 18th World Cup appearance for England in a 2–1 victory over Norway after extra time in the quarter-finals. Following a 2–1 defeat to defending champions Argentina in the semi-final, England beat France 6–4 in the third place play-off.

== Style of play ==
Pickford is known for his shot-stopping, reflexes, distribution with his feet, and consistency as a goalkeeper, as well as his composure and penalty-stopping abilities. Although Pickford's reception among pundits has been mixed, he has been praised in the media for his leadership and decisive performances with the England national team in international tournaments, with former England international Theo Walcott labelling him as one of England's greatest goalkeepers ever. His former Everton teammate, fellow goalkeeper Asmir Begović, instead described Pickford as one of the best goalkeepers in the Premier League.

== Career statistics ==
=== Club ===
As of match played 6 November 2026

Appearances and goals by club, season and competition
| Club | Season | League | | | FA Cup | | EFL Cup | | Europe | | Other | | Total | |
| Club | Season | Division | Apps | Goals | Apps | Goals | Apps | Goals | Apps | Goals | Apps | Goals | Apps | Goals |
|---|---|---|---|---|---|---|---|---|---|---|---|---|---|---|
| Sunderland | 2013–14 | Premier League | 0 | 0 | 0 | 0 | 0 | 0 | — | | — | | 0 | 0 |
| Sunderland | 2014–15 | Premier League | 0 | 0 | — | | — | | — | | — | | 0 | 0 |
| Sunderland | 2015–16 | Premier League | 2 | 0 | 1 | 0 | — | | — | | — | | 3 | 0 |
| Sunderland | 2016–17 | Premier League | 29 | 0 | 0 | 0 | 3 | 0 | — | | — | | 32 | 0 |
| Sunderland | Total | | 31 | 0 | 1 | 0 | 3 | 0 | — | | — | | 35 | 0 |
| Darlington (loan) | 2011–12 | Conference Premier | 17 | 0 | — | | — | | — | | — | | 17 | 0 |
| Alfreton Town (loan) | 2012–13 | Conference Premier | 12 | 0 | — | | — | | — | | — | | 12 | 0 |
| Burton Albion (loan) | 2013–14 | League Two | 12 | 0 | — | | 1 | 0 | — | | — | | 13 | 0 |
| Carlisle United (loan) | 2013–14 | League One | 18 | 0 | — | | — | | — | | — | | 18 | 0 |
| Bradford City (loan) | 2014–15 | League One | 33 | 0 | — | | — | | — | | 1 (Note: Appearance in Football League Trophy) | 0 | 34 | 0 |
| Preston North End (loan) | 2015–16 | Championship | 24 | 0 | — | | 3 | 0 | — | | — | | 27 | 0 |
| Everton | 2017–18 | Premier League | 38 | 0 | 1 | 0 | 1 | 0 | 6 (Note: Appearances in UEFA Europa League) | 0 | — | | 46 | 0 |
| Everton | 2018–19 | Premier League | 38 | 0 | 2 | 0 | 0 | 0 | — | | — | | 40 | 0 |
| Everton | 2019–20 | Premier League | 38 | 0 | 1 | 0 | 4 | 0 | — | | — | | 43 | 0 |
| Everton | 2020–21 | Premier League | 31 | 0 | 0 | 0 | 2 | 0 | — | | — | | 33 | 0 |
| Everton | 2021–22 | Premier League | 35 | 0 | 2 | 0 | 0 | 0 | — | | — | | 37 | 0 |
| Everton | 2022–23 | Premier League | 37 | 0 | 1 | 0 | 0 | 0 | — | | — | | 38 | 0 |
| Everton | 2023–24 | Premier League | 38 | 0 | 0 | 0 | 4 | 0 | — | | — | | 42 | 0 |
| Everton | 2024–25 | Premier League | 38 | 0 | 1 | 0 | 1 | 0 | — | | — | | 40 | 0 |
| Everton | 2025–26 | Premier League | 38 | 0 | 1 | 0 | 0 | 0 | — | | — | | 39 | 0 |
| Everton | 2026–27 | Premier League | 10 | 0 | 0 | 0 | 3 | 0 | — | | — | | 13 | 0 |
| Everton | Total | | 341 | 0 | 9 | 0 | 15 | 0 | 6 | 0 | — | | 371 | 0 |
| Career total | | | 488 | 0 | 10 | 0 | 22 | 0 | 6 | 0 | 1 | 0 | 527 | 0 |

=== International ===
As of match played 12 November 2026

Appearances and goals by national team and year
| National team | Year | Apps | Goals |
|---|---|---|---|
| England | 2017 | 1 | 0 |
| England | 2018 | 14 | 0 |
| England | 2019 | 9 | 0 |
| England | 2020 | 6 | 0 |
| England | 2021 | 12 | 0 |
| England | 2022 | 8 | 0 |
| England | 2023 | 8 | 0 |
| England | 2024 | 15 | 0 |
| England | 2025 | 8 | 0 |
| England | 2026 | 13 | 0 |
| Total | | 94 | 0 |

== Honours ==
England U21

- Toulon Tournament: 2016

England

- UEFA European Championship runner-up: 2020, 2024
- FIFA World Cup third place: 2026
- UEFA Nations League third place: 2018–19

Individual

- Everton Player of the Season: 2017–18, 2021–22, 2022–23, 2023–24
- Everton Players' Player of the Season: 2017–18
- Everton Young Player of the Season: 2017–18
- England Under-21 Player of the Year: 2017
- UEFA Nations League Finals Team of the Tournament: 2019
- Premier League Save of the Season: 2021–22,2025–26
- Premier League Save of the Month: September 2022, January 2024, November 2025, February 2026, August 2026
- Fantasy Premier League Team of the Season: 2023–24
