= Premier League Save of the Season =

English annual football award

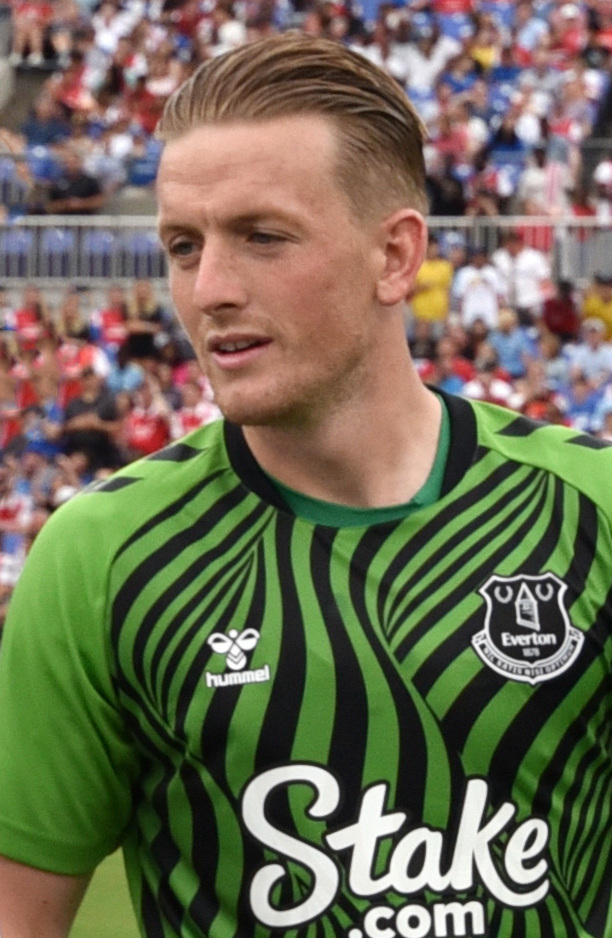
Jordan Pickford was the first player to have won the award, and the only player to win the award twice.

The Premier League Save of the Season is an annual English football award, presented to the goalkeeper deemed to have made the best save in the preceding Premier League season. For sponsorship purposes, it was called the Castrol Save of the Season from its inception during the 2021–22 season until the 2023–24 season.

In 2022, the Premier League Save of the Season was first awarded, with Jordan Pickford of Everton its inaugural recipient. Pickford is also the current holder of the award, winning it for a second time in 2026.

== Winners ==
Key
Player (X)	Name of the player and number of times they had won the award at that point (if more than one)
†	Indicates multiple award winners in the same season
‡	Denotes the club were Premier League champions in the same season
↓	Denotes the club were relegated in the same season

Key
Italics	Home team

Premier League Save of the Season winners
Season	Player	Nationality	Club	Score	Opponent	Date	Ref.
2021–22	Jordan Pickford (1)	England	Everton	1–0	Chelsea	1 May 2022	
2022–23	Kepa Arrizabalaga	Spain	Chelsea	2–0	Aston Villa	16 October 2022	
2023–24	Thomas Kaminski	Belgium	Luton Town↓	2–1	Crystal Palace	25 November 2023	
2024–25	Emiliano Martínez	Argentina	Aston Villa	1–2	Nottingham Forest	14 December 2024	
2025–26	Jordan Pickford (2)	England	Everton	3–2	Newcastle United	28 February 2026	

1. Player's team's score listed first.

== Awards won by nationality ==
Country	Players	Total
England	1	2
Argentina	1	1
Belgium	1	1
Spain	1	1

== Awards won by club ==
Club	Players	Total
Everton	1	2
Aston Villa	1	1
Chelsea	1	1
Luton Town	1	1

== See also ==
- Premier League Save of the Month
- Premier League Golden Glove
- Premier League Goal of the Season
- Premier League Player of the Season
- Premier League Young Player of the Season
- Premier League Playmaker of the Season
- Premier League Manager of the Season
- Premier League Game Changer of the Season
- Premier League Most Powerful Goal
