= Emiliano Martínez =

Argentine footballer (born 1992)

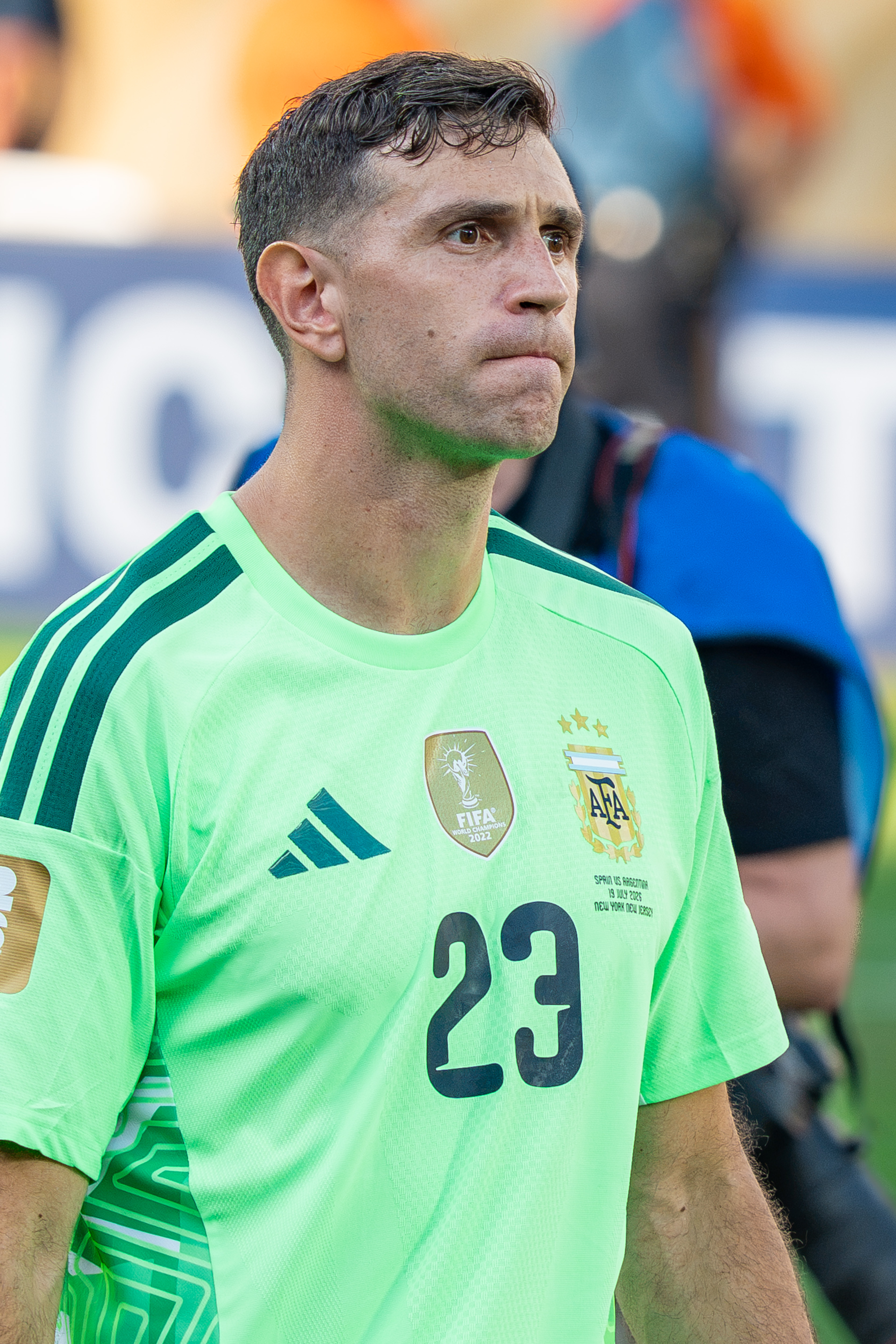
- Martínez with Argentina in 2026

Personal information
- Full name: Damián Emiliano Martínez Romero
- Date of birth: 2 September 1992 (age 34)
- Place of birth: Mar del Plata, Argentina
- Height: 1.95 m (6 ft 5 in)
- Position: Goalkeeper

Team information
- Current team: Chelsea
- Number: 1

Youth career
- 2008–2010: Independiente
- 2010–2012: Arsenal

Senior career*
Years	Team	Apps	(Gls)
2012–2020	Arsenal	15	(0)
2012	→ Oxford United (loan)	1	(0)
2013–2014	→ Sheffield Wednesday (loan)	11	(0)
2015	→ Rotherham United (loan)	8	(0)
2015–2016	→ Wolverhampton Wanderers (loan)	13	(0)
2017–2018	→ Getafe (loan)	5	(0)
2019	→ Reading (loan)	18	(0)
2020–2026	Aston Villa	213	(0)
2026–	Chelsea	7	(0)

International career^{‡}
2009	Argentina U17	2	(0)
2009–2011	Argentina U20	5	(0)
2021–	Argentina	71	(0)
Medal record
Men's football
Representing Argentina
FIFA World Cup
Winner	2022 Qatar
Runner-up	2026 Canada–Mexico–US
Copa América
Winner	2021 Brazil
Winner	2024 United States
Finalissima
Winner	2022 England
- * Club domestic league appearances and goals as of 20:16, 21 November 2026 (UTC) ‡ National team caps and goals as of 08:50, 18 November 2026 (UTC)

Damián Emiliano Martínez Romero (born 2 September 1992), also known as Dibu Martínez, is an Argentine professional footballer who plays as a goalkeeper for Premier League club Chelsea and the Argentina national team. Known as a specialist in saving penalty kicks, he is often regarded as one of the best goalkeepers in the world.

Martínez trained at Independiente's youth ranks before moving to Premier League club Arsenal in 2010. At Arsenal, he initially served as a backup goalkeeper, being loaned to various clubs, before breaking into the starting line-up in 2019, featuring in the Premier League and helping the club win an FA Cup and FA Community Shield.

In September 2020, Martínez moved to fellow Premier League club Aston Villa in a transfer worth £20 million. In his first season at the club, he kept a club-record fifteen clean sheets in the Premier League, and he won the UEFA Europa League in his sixth and final season. In August 2026, he left Villa and transferred to Chelsea, making his debut for the Blues against Brighton & Hove Albion on the same day of his arrival.

Martínez represented Argentina in youth international matches from 2009 to 2011, playing on under-17 and under-20 levels. He earned his first senior cap for Argentina in 2021 and won the 2021 Copa América with the team, receiving the Golden Glove award. He went on to win the 2022 FIFA World Cup with Argentina, again being voted best goalkeeper of the tournament, and the 2024 Copa América, where he was awarded the Golden Glove a third time. He was also named The Best FIFA Goalkeeper a record two times in 2022 and 2024, and received the Yashin Trophy, also a joint-record two times (with Gianluigi Donnarumma), in 2023 and 2024.

== Club career ==
=== Independiente ===
Born in Mar del Plata, Martínez started his career playing for Independiente's youth team. In 2009, shortly after his 17th birthday, he was invited to trial at Arsenal, and was initially offered a youth contract.

=== Arsenal ===
==== 2010–2019: Loan moves and fringe appearances ====
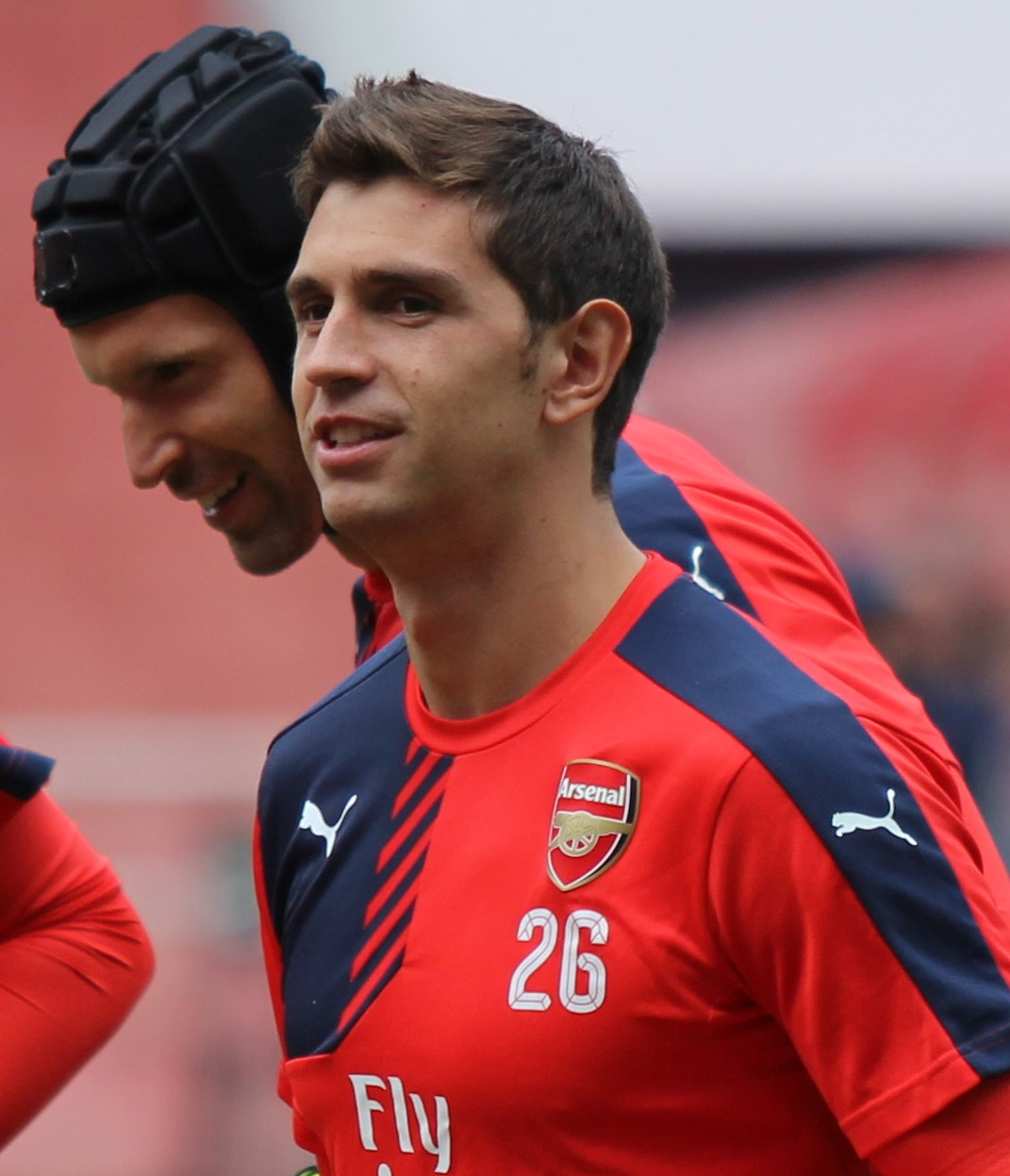
Martínez training with Arsenal in 2015

After impressing in a trial and being approved for a work permit, Martínez was formally registered as an Arsenal player in July 2010.

After injuries to Ryan Clarke and Wayne Brown, and the termination of Connor Ripley's loan, Martínez went on emergency loan to Oxford United, making his debut in the Football League in their final game of the season against Port Vale in League Two on 5 May 2012; Port Vale won 3–0. Later that year, Martínez was named on the Arsenal substitute bench for their fixtures away at Stoke City on 26 August and against Liverpool on 2 September, as cover for the injured Wojciech Szczęsny and Łukasz Fabiański, respectively. On 26 September, he made his Arsenal debut in a 6–1 home win against Coventry City in the third-round of the League Cup. He made his second Arsenal appearance in the following round in a 7–5 win away to Reading. Martínez subsequently transferred to Championship club Sheffield Wednesday on an emergency 28-day loan on 15 October 2013. He made his debut for Wednesday on 23 November, against Yorkshire rivals Huddersfield Town. Martínez's loan was eventually extended until the end of the season.

After returning to Arsenal, Martínez was an unused substitute as Arsenal won the 2014 FA Community Shield on 10 August, with a 3–0 win over Manchester City at Wembley Stadium. He made his debut in the Champions League soon after, helping Arsenal defeat Anderlecht 2–1 in the group stage. He then made his Premier League debut as a second-half substitute, replacing the injured Szczęsny against Manchester United at the Emirates Stadium on 22 November. With injuries to backup goalkeeper David Ospina, Martínez played his second Champions League game on 26 November, keeping a clean sheet in a 2–0 victory over Borussia Dortmund. His "faultless" performance in the match led to him being named in the UEFA Team of the Week. He made his first Premier League start on 29 November against West Bromwich Albion, and also started against Southampton four days later; he kept two clean sheets as Arsenal won both matches 1–0.

On 20 March 2015, Martínez joined Championship club Rotherham United on an emergency loan until the end of the season. He made his debut the following day against South Yorkshire rivals Sheffield Wednesday, losing 3–2. Despite the poor start, Rotherham finished the season strongly with Martínez in goal, only losing 1 of the last 6 games and avoided relegation. Despite only playing a dozen games from the club, his reflex saves in important games made him a fan favourite.

On 2 August, Martínez was an unused substitute as new signing Petr Čech played for Arsenal in the 2015 Community Shield, a 1–0 win over rivals Chelsea. On 11 August, he joined Championship club Wolverhampton Wanderers on a season-long loan. After making 15 appearances in the opening months of the campaign, he suffered a thigh injury that kept him out of contention for several months and was unable to regain his starting place afterwards. He spent the 2016–17 season at Arsenal and played five matches during the campaign, including two Premier League appearances against Crystal Palace and West Ham United.

On 2 August 2017, he joined La Liga club Getafe on a season-long loan, and on 23 January 2019, he was loaned to Championship club Reading until the end of the season. At Reading, Martínez made his debut on 29 January against Bolton Wanderers, and won the man of the match award against Aston Villa a few days later.

==== 2019–2020: Breakthrough and departure ====
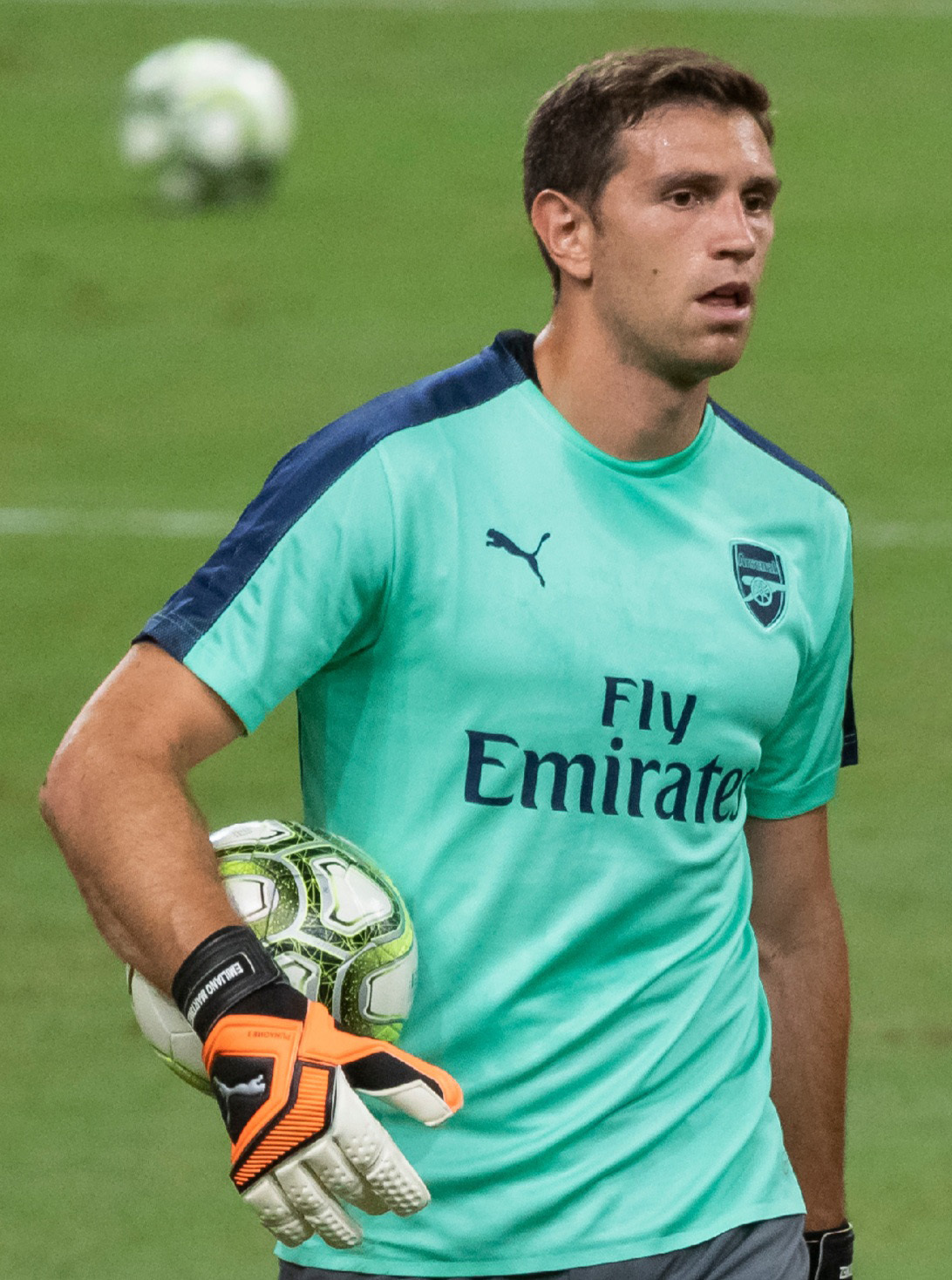
Martínez training with Arsenal in 2018

With Bernd Leno being taken off injured during the first half of Arsenal's defeat to Brighton & Hove Albion on 20 June 2020, Martínez came off the bench to make his first Premier League appearance since the 2016–17 season. This led to Martínez seeing out the season as first-choice goalkeeper at the club and was highly commended for a string of stellar performances, with former Arsenal striker Ian Wright describing him as "commanding" and as having played "brilliantly" during his extended spell in the team. On 1 August, Martínez was selected to start in the FA Cup Final against Chelsea, making some crucial saves to help Arsenal win their 14th FA Cup; after lifting the trophy he was visibly emotional and reduced to tears.

Martínez started in the 2020 Community Shield against Liverpool on 29 August, which Arsenal won on penalties. Following the match, there was much speculation that Martínez would leave the club with Bernd Leno returning and the player himself stated that he either wanted to stay at the club and be first-choice keeper or leave on a permanent basis. With reported interest from a number of clubs, including Aston Villa and Brighton & Hove Albion, Martínez was left out of the squad to face Fulham on the opening day of the league season.

=== Aston Villa ===
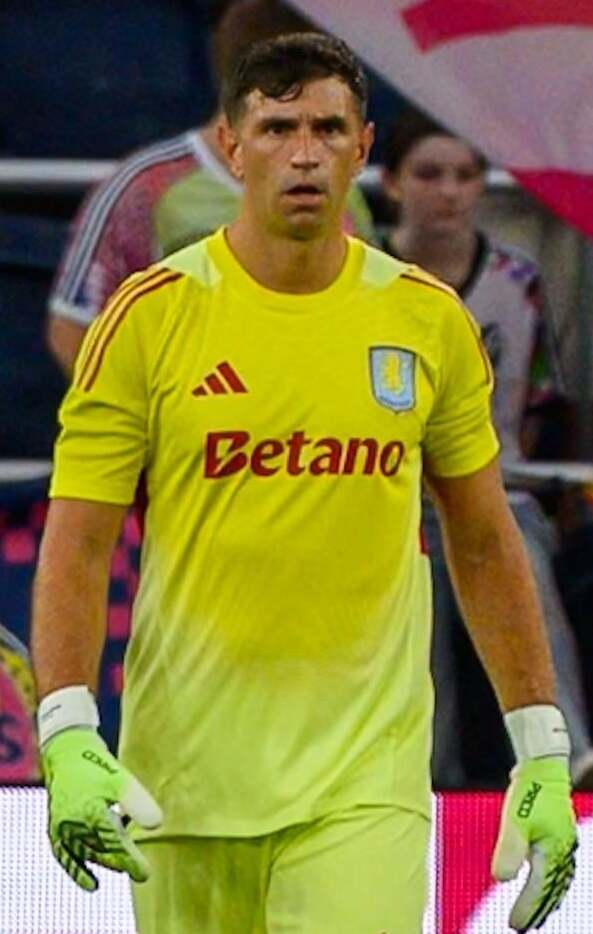
Martínez with Aston Villa in 2025

On 16 September 2020, Martínez transferred to fellow Premier League club Aston Villa in a deal worth up to £20 million. He signed a four-year contract. On 21 September, Martínez made his debut for Villa, saving a penalty from John Lundstram in a 1–0 home win against Sheffield United. In his first season at Aston Villa, Martínez equalled Brad Friedel's club record for clean sheets in a Premier League season, with 15. He was also named Aston Villa Supporters' Player of the Season.

On 21 January 2022, Martínez signed a three-year contract extension which will see him contracted to Villa until the end of the 2026–27 season. On 27 July, ahead of the new season, Martínez was named one of the two Aston Villa vice-captains, alongside Diego Carlos. On 1 April 2023, Martínez made his 100th Premier League appearance for Aston Villa in a 2–0 away victory over Chelsea. That clean sheet was Martínez's 34th, which broke the club record of the most clean sheets in a goalkeeper's first 100 games – which was previously set at 33, by both Mark Bosnich and Brad Friedel. On 18 April 2024, he saved two penalties in a 4–3 victory over Lille following a 3–3 draw on aggregate, which qualified his club to the Conference League semi-finals.

On the eve of the 2024–25 season, Martínez chose to switch his shirt number from the traditional number 1, to the number 23 shirt worn for Argentina during his successful cup campaigns with them. On 21 August 2024, Martínez signed a new long-term contract with Aston Villa, lasting until 2029. He won the Premier League Save of the Month award for December 2024, his first time winning the award, for a goal line save against Nottingham Forest in a 1–2 loss. Martínez stopped a header from compatriot Nicolás Domínguez that went past him by reaching behind him and swatting it away as it was on the goal line. During Aston Villa's final game of the season against Manchester United, Martínez was given a straight red card and sent off in the first half after making a challenge on Rasmus Højlund outside the box.

In November 2025, Aston Villa manager Unai Emery confirmed that he had stripped Martínez of his vice-captaincy, giving the role to Ezri Konsa. Emery did not elaborate, other than saying he had a conversation with Martínez, although there was speculation that the decision was related to Martínez's failed attempts at generating a move away from Villa the previous summer transfer window.

On 11 May 2026, he made his first ever assist in a 2–2 draw against Burnley. On 20 May, Martínez started in the 2026 UEFA Europa League final, in which Aston Villa beat SC Freiburg 3–0.

=== Chelsea ===
On 30 August 2026, Martínez signed for Chelsea for £7.5 million, on a three-year contract. He made his debut on the same day in a 4–3 victory over Brighton & Hove Albion.

On 17 October, Martínez suffered a head injury following a collision with Everton defender Jarrad Branthwaite. He was subsequently substituted off for Mike Penders and kept a clean sheet in a 2–0 victory.

== International career ==
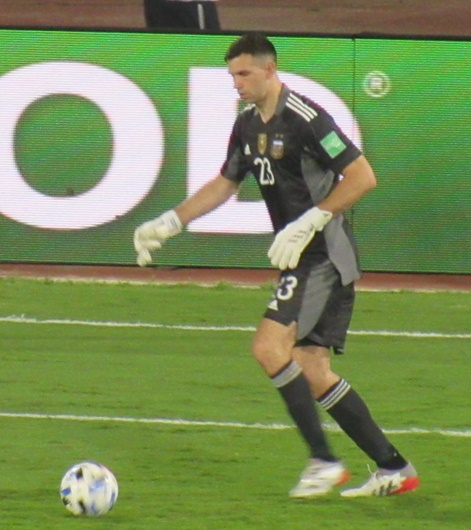
Martínez playing for Argentina in 2022

Martínez was called up to the Argentina senior squad to replace Oscar Ustari to face Nigeria in June 2011. He received his second senior call up against Germany and Ecuador on 9 and 13 October 2019; he was an unused substitute for both friendly matches.

Having played a full season as first-choice goalkeeper for Premier League side Aston Villa, 28-year-old Martínez made his international debut on 3 June 2021, in a 1–1 draw with Chile in a 2022 FIFA World Cup qualification match. He subsequently made his competitive debut in a major tournament on 14 June, once again in a 1–1 draw against the same opponent in his team's opening match of the 2021 Copa América at the Estádio Olímpico Nilton Santos in Brazil. In the 57th minute, he saved a penalty from Arturo Vidal, but he failed to prevent Eduardo Vargas from scoring on the rebound. On 6 July, Martínez saved three spot kicks in a 3–2 penalty shootout victory for Argentina over Colombia in the semi-final of the tournament. He went on to finish the tournament with a clean sheet in the 1–0 victory over Brazil in the final. Martínez was also awarded the 2021 Copa América's Golden Glove award as the best keeper of the tournament for his performances.

On 1 June 2022, Martínez kept a clean sheet as Argentina won 3–0 against reigning European Champions Italy at Wembley Stadium in the 2022 Finalissima. Martínez was included in Argentina's squad for the 2022 FIFA World Cup in Qatar, and played in each of his team's games. He saved two penalties from Virgil van Dijk and Steven Berghuis in a shoot-out against the Netherlands in the quarter-final, helping his team advance to the semi-final. In the final, Martínez saved a shot from a 1 on 1 with Randal Kolo Muani in the 123rd minute of extra time to force the match to a penalty shoot-out. He later saved the penalty from Kingsley Coman in the penalty shoot-out, helping Argentina win the tournament via a 4–2 shootout victory after the game had ended in a 3–3 draw after extra time. He won the Golden Glove award for his performances in the tournament. Martínez also won the 2022 The Best FIFA Men's Goalkeeper award.

On 15 June 2024, he was selected in the 26-man squad for the 2024 Copa América. In the quarter-final match against Ecuador, he saved two penalty kicks following a 1–1 draw, securing his country's qualification to the semi-finals. On 14 July 2024, Martínez played the full match as Argentina defeated Colombia 1–0 after extra time in the 2024 Copa América final. Martínez was also named winner of the Golden Glove for the second time.

On 28 September 2024, Martínez was banned by FIFA from taking part in two matches for "violating principles of fairplay" in two separate incidents. The first was his holding a replica of the Copa America trophy to his groin after Argentina won in a World Cup qualifier against Chile on 5 September, while the second concerned his assault on a television camera after Argentina lost 2–1 to Colombia in another qualifier on 10 September.

On 27 May 2026, Martínez was selected in the 26-man squad for the 2026 FIFA World Cup. He started all eight matches for Argentina during the tournament, keeping two clean sheets on their run to the final. In the final against Spain, he saved 11 shots, the most by a goalkeeper in a World Cup final, as Argentina lost 1–0 after extra time.

== Player profile ==
=== Reception ===
Often described as one of the best goalkeepers in the world, Martínez is known for his distribution and shot-stopping ability. He has also been noted for his passionate style and bravado in goal, as well as his technique and mentality when stopping penalty kicks.

However, some sports journalists have voiced the opinion that Martínez's talent is exaggerated. In 2025, Phil McNulty, BBC Sport’s chief football writer, stated: “Some Aston Villa fans may regard this as sacrilege, but I actually think Emi Martínez is overrated. He is certainly not "the world's number one", as we are so often told. Far from it, in fact.” In the run-up to the announcement of the winner of the 2024 Yashin Trophy, football journalistic website 3 Added Minutes noted that Martínez's goals prevented relative to expected goals ranked unfavorably compared to fellow nominees Yann Sommer, Unai Simón, Gianluigi Donnarumma, Giorgi Mamardashvili, and Gregor Kobel. After Martínez won the award, Goal journalist James Westwood opined that “He has certainly enjoyed holding that title, but does he really deserve it? The answer is no, especially not ahead of truly world-class operators like Thibaut Courtois, Alisson Becker, Jan Oblak and Gianluigi Donnarumma. Martinez is a good goalkeeper who has done remarkably well to achieve so much after waiting eight years for his chance to shine at Arsenal, but he's not a great one. When Martinez eventually hangs up his gloves, he will be remembered more for his antagonising abilities than those with his hands or feet.” During the 2023–24 season, Martínez became the goalkeeper with the most own goals to his name (3) in Premier League history.

Criticism of Martínez intensified in the 2024–25 season, where he conceded 45 goals in total. Only four Premier League goalkeepers conceded more over the course of the season; additionally, of the 43 goalkeepers to play any number of minutes in the top flight since August, he ranked 36th in terms of the difference between the expected goals he faced and those he conceded. Critics also perceived an increase in the number of major errors made by Martínez.

=== Penalty performances ===
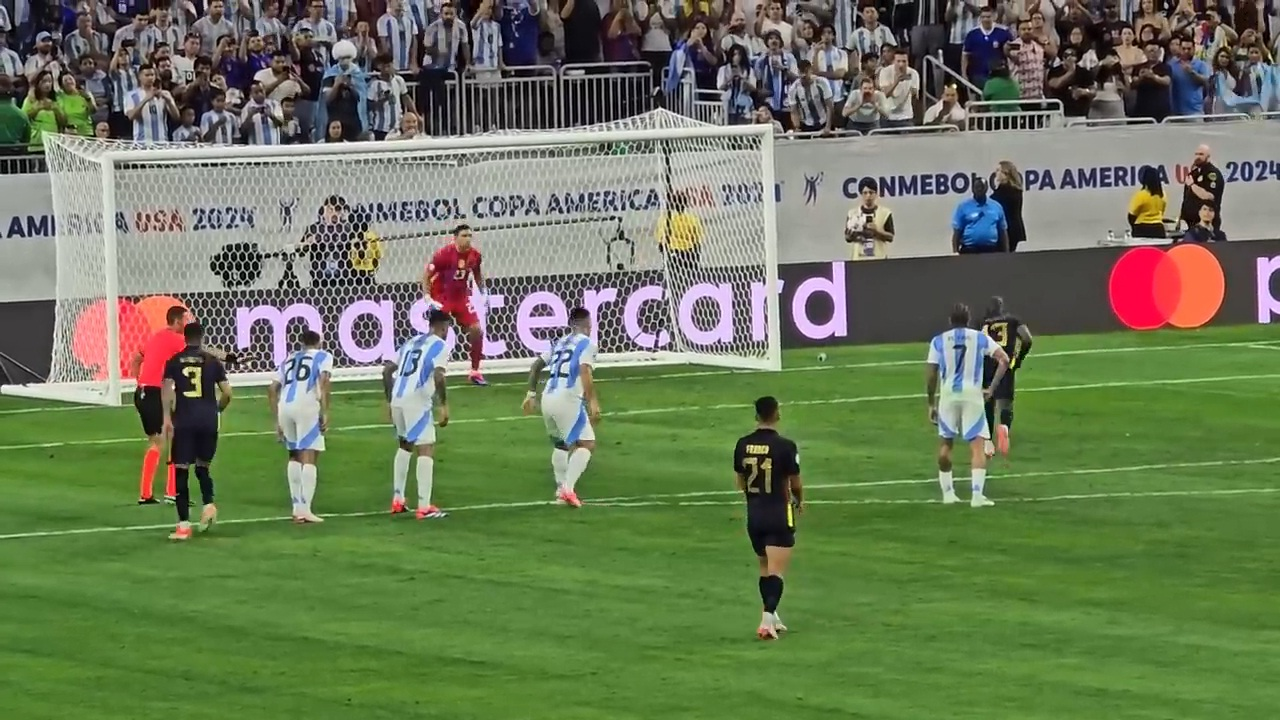
Martínez (pictured here playing for Argentina at the 2024 Copa América) is widely known for specialising in saving penalty kicks.

Martínez has particularly garnered notoriety for his performances in penalty kicks and shoot-outs; in Martínez's five shoot-outs with Argentina and Aston Villa as of July 2024, opponents have scored only 12 times from 23 attempts, a 52% conversion rate (the average shoot-out conversion rate is 70–80%), with Martínez saving ten spot kicks and the other miss being off-target. By the end of 2022, Martínez had saved seven of the 35 penalties he has faced during matches throughout his career, as well as another three missed – resulting in a 71% conversion rate for opponents (the average in-game conversion rate is 80–85%). Combining the 59 penalties faced by Martínez in regulation and competitive shoot-outs during that time span, of which Martínez saved 13 and saw five missed outright, results in a 69.5% conversion rate.

Martínez's role goes beyond simply saving penalties; he is known for using psychological tactics and gamesmanship to distract and intimidate opposing penalty takers. Former goalkeeper Matt Pyzdrowski described Martínez's penalty kick antics as "one of the most aggressive and disruptive approaches that you will ever see." Felipe Cardenas of The Athletic has also highlighted his "theatrical methods of intimidation".

Martínez's approach to penalties has drawn some criticism for a perceived lack of sportsmanship. French goalkeeper Hugo Lloris, who participated in a penalty shoot-out with Martínez in the 2022 FIFA World Cup final, later stated "there are some things I can't do. Making a fool of myself in goal, rattling my opponents, crossing that line... I'm too rational and honest a man to go that way." The International Football Association Board has discussed changing its rules to discourage goalkeepers from employing similar tactics in the future. When asked about potential rule changes, Martínez responded "I already saved the penalties that I had to save."

==== Notable examples ====
- In the 2021 Copa América semi-final against Colombia, Martínez subjected several of the Colombian penalty takers to a barrage of insults. Three of the Colombian players—Davinson Sánchez, Yerry Mina, and Edwin Cardona—had their penalty kicks saved, allowing Argentina to advance to the final.
- During a 2021 Premier League match between Aston Villa and Manchester United at Old Trafford, United were awarded a penalty in stoppage time, with Bruno Fernandes taking it. As preparations for the penalty began, Martínez openly questioned Fernandes why his United teammate Cristiano Ronaldo was not taking it. Fernandes missed the penalty by kicking it over the crossbar, securing a 1–0 win for Aston Villa.
- Martínez employed a number of gamesmanship tactics during the 2022 FIFA World Cup quarter-final against the Netherlands, including: pretending to hand the ball to Steven Berghuis before dropping it, kicking the ball to the side while staring down Teun Koopmeiners prior to his turn, and kicking the ball into the centre circle as Wout Weghorst approached the penalty area. Two Netherlands players—Berghuis and Virgil van Dijk—had their penalties saved by Martínez, resulting in Argentina advancing to the semi-final.
- In the 2022 FIFA World Cup final against France, Martínez used similar tactics. After both Kylian Mbappé and Kingsley Coman placed the ball for their kicks, Martínez argued with the referee about whether the ball was placed properly, disrupting each takers' preparations. Prior to Aurélien Tchouaméni's kick, Martínez grabbed the ball and tossed it to the side, forcing Tchouaméni to retrieve it. Martínez shouted "I've watched you" and gesticulated to Randal Kolo Muani as Muani prepared for his shot; the referee issued Martinez a yellow card for this behavior. Coman's effort was saved by Martínez and Tchouaméni missed his shot, helping Argentina win the shoot-out and the World Cup.
- In the second leg of the 2023–24 UEFA Europa Conference League quarter-finals between Aston Villa and Lille, Lille supporters booed and jeered Martinez throughout the game. When the match culminated in a penalty shoot-out, Martínez was booked for gesturing towards the opposing fans after blocking Nabil Bentaleb's shot, but despite being booked earlier in the game, Martínez was not sent off for a second yellow card, as yellow cards given before shoot-outs do not carry over into the shoot-out. Villa subsequently won 4–3 on penalties, with Martínez saving Benjamin André's final shot.

== Personal life ==
Martínez was given the names "Damián Emiliano" on his birth certificate, which caused confusion when he signed for Arsenal and everyone at the club was calling him Damián. "My name was actually going to be Emiliano Damian on my Argentinian ID," Martínez later explained. "But when my mum went to do it in the post office, I don't know where she done it, she was waiting hours and hours in the queue and when they done it they put Damian Emiliano first. To do it again she would have to wait two, three hours so she went 'it's ok, just do it like that, we're going to call him Emi anyway'. It was a bit confusing but now everyone calls me Emi. Damian used to be my grandad's middle name. My mum [originally] wanted just two names – Emiliano Martínez – but because my grandad passed away before I was born she wanted to put Damian in between the two names to have my grandad's name, nothing else."

He is nicknamed "Dibu" (abbreviation of Dibujo, Spanish for Drawing), after an animated character in the Argentine telenovela Mi familia es un dibujo. Martínez was given the nickname as a young player by former goalkeeper and goalkeeper coach Miguel Ángel Santoro at Independiente, at a time when the series was highly popular.

Martínez has been married to Amanda "Mandinha" (née Gama) since 2017. The couple have a son, Santi, and a daughter, Ava.

On 22 December 2022, after winning the 2022 FIFA World Cup with the national team, Martínez was given a welcome reception at Las Toscas resort, in his native city of Mar del Plata. According to the local press, there was an attendance of more than 150,000 people, both locals and tourists.

Martinez was reported to be among the four members of the Argentina national football team who followed Javier Milei on Instagram after the latter's victory in the 2023 Argentine general election.

== Career statistics ==
=== Club ===
As of match played 21 November 2026

Appearances and goals by club, season and competition
Club	Season	League			National cup (Note: Includes FA Cup, Copa del Rey)		League cup (Note: Includes Football League/EFL Cup)		Europe		Other		Total	
Club	Season	Division	Apps	Goals	Apps	Goals	Apps	Goals	Apps	Goals	Apps	Goals	Apps	Goals
Arsenal	2011–12	Premier League	0	0	0	0	0	0	0	0	—		0	0
Arsenal	2012–13	Premier League	0	0	0	0	2	0	0	0	—		2	0
Arsenal	2013–14	Premier League	0	0	—		0	0	0	0	—		0	0
Arsenal	2014–15	Premier League	4	0	0	0	0	0	2 (Note: Appearances in UEFA Champions League)	0	0	0	6	0
Arsenal	2015–16	Premier League	0	0	—		—		—		0	0	0	0
Arsenal	2016–17	Premier League	2	0	0	0	3	0	0	0	—		5	0
Arsenal	2018–19	Premier League	0	0	0	0	0	0	1 (Note: Appearance(s) in UEFA Europa League)	0	—		1	0
Arsenal	2019–20	Premier League	9	0	6	0	2	0	6	0	—		23	0
Arsenal	2020–21	Premier League	0	0	—		—		—		1 (Note: Appearance in FA Community Shield)	0	1	0
Arsenal	Total		15	0	6	0	7	0	9	0	1	0	38	0
Oxford United (loan)	2011–12	League Two	1	0	—		—		—		—		1	0
Sheffield Wednesday (loan)	2013–14	Championship	11	0	4	0	—		—		—		15	0
Rotherham United (loan)	2014–15	Championship	8	0	—		—		—		—		8	0
Wolverhampton Wanderers (loan)	2015–16	Championship	13	0	0	0	2	0	—		—		15	0
Getafe (loan)	2017–18	La Liga	5	0	2	0	—		—		—		7	0
Reading (loan)	2018–19	Championship	18	0	—		—		—		—		18	0
Aston Villa	2020–21	Premier League	38	0	0	0	0	0	—		—		38	0
Aston Villa	2021–22	Premier League	36	0	1	0	0	0	—		—		37	0
Aston Villa	2022–23	Premier League	36	0	0	0	1	0	—		—		37	0
Aston Villa	2023–24	Premier League	34	0	3	0	0	0	10 (Note: Appearances in UEFA Europa Conference League)	0	—		47	0
Aston Villa	2024–25	Premier League	37	0	4	0	0	0	12	0	—		53	0
Aston Villa	2025–26	Premier League	32	0	1	0	0	0	11	0	—		44	0
Aston Villa	Total		213	0	9	0	1	0	33	0	—		256	0
Chelsea	2026–27	Premier League	7	0	0	0	0	0	—		—		7	0
Career total			291	0	21	0	10	0	42	0	1	0	365	0

=== International ===
As of match played 17 November 2026

Appearances and goals by national team and year
National team	Year	Apps	Goals
Argentina	2021	14	0
Argentina	2022	12	0
Argentina	2023	10	0
Argentina	2024	13	0
Argentina	2025	8	0
Argentina	2026	14	0
Total		71	0

== Honours ==
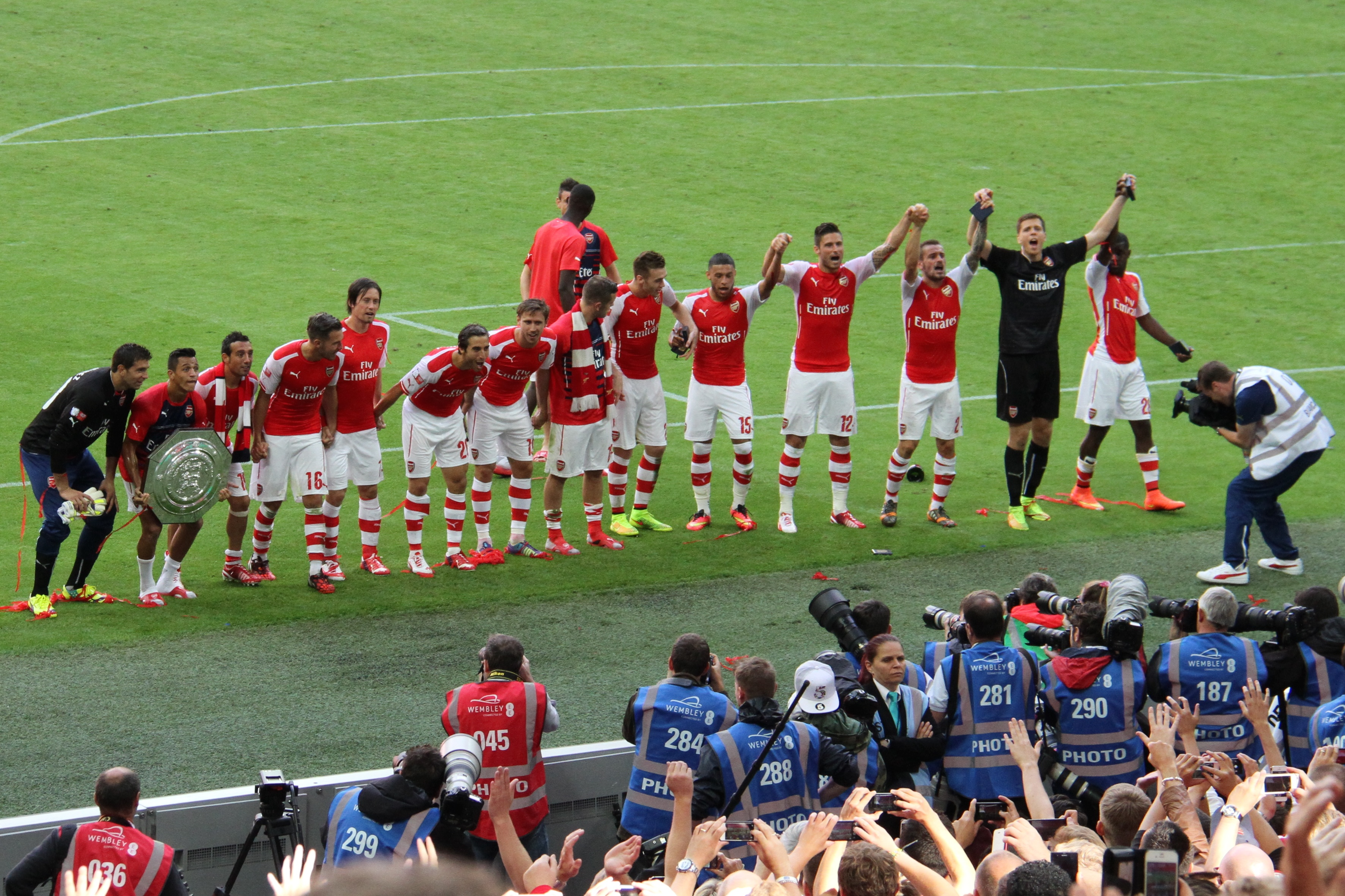
Martínez (far left) celebrating with his Arsenal teammates after winning the 2014 FA Community Shield

Arsenal

- FA Cup: 2019–20
- FA Community Shield: 2014, 2015, 2020

Aston Villa

- UEFA Europa League: 2025–26

Argentina

- FIFA World Cup: 2022
- Copa América: 2021, 2024
- Finalissima: 2022

Individual

- Aston Villa Player of the Season: 2020–21
- Copa América Golden Glove: 2021, 2024
- Copa América Team of the Tournament: 2021, 2024
- IFFHS Team of the Copa América: 2021, 2024
- IFFHS Men's CONMEBOL Team: 2021, 2022, 2024, 2025
- IFFHS CONMEBOL Best Goalkeeper: 2021
- FIFA World Cup Golden Glove: 2022
- The Best FIFA Men's Goalkeeper: 2022, 2024
- Yashin Trophy: 2023, 2024
- The Athletic Premier League Team of the Season: 2023–24
- FIFA Men's World 11: 2024
- IFFHS World's Best Goalkeeper: 2024
- IFFHS Men's World Team: 2024
- Olimpia de Oro: 2024 (ex aequo)
- Premier League Save of the Month: December 2024
- Footballer of the Year of Argentina: 2024
- Premier League Save of the Season: 2024–25
- UEFA Europa League Team of the Season: 2025–26
