= Premier League Save of the Month =

Association football award

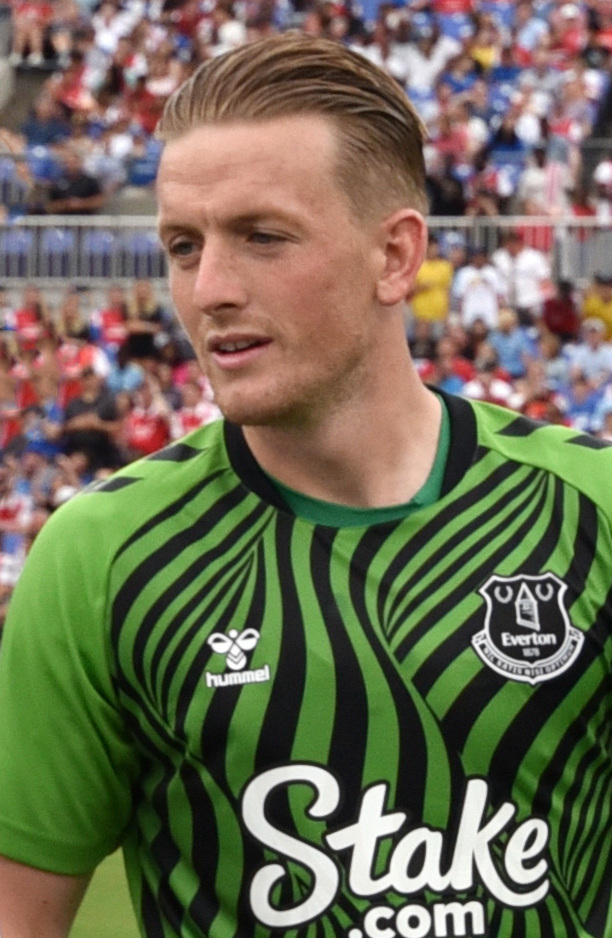
Jordan Pickford has won the award a record five times.

The Premier League Save of the Month is an association football award that recognises the goalkeeper deemed to have made the best Premier League save in each month of the season from August to April. For sponsorship purposes, it was called the Castrol Save of the Month for the first two seasons since its inception during the 2022–23 season. Since the 2025–26 season it has been known as the Coca-Cola Save of the Month.

In August 2022, the Premier League Save of the Month was first awarded, with Nick Pope of Newcastle United its inaugural recipient. Pope was also the first goalkeeper to achieve his second accolade for January 2023. Aaron Ramsdale became first goalkeeper to receive two consecutive awards, after scooping awards for March and April 2023. Chelsea became the first club to have two goalkeepers win the award, when Robert Sánchez claimed September 2023 accolade. In August 2024, Arsenal goalkeeper David Raya became the first goalkeeper to receive two nominations in the same month. Later that year, Manchester United goalkeeper André Onana became the award's first triple-recipient. In 2025, Manchester City became the first club to have two different goalkeepers win the award consecutively, with James Trafford and Gianluigi Donnarumma claiming the August and September 2025 awards respectively. In March 2026, Everton goalkeeper Jordan Pickford became the first to win the accolade four times, before winning his fifth in August.

As of October 2026, the most recent winner of the award is Chelsea goalkeeper Mike Penders.

== Winners ==
Key
Italics	Home team

Month	Year	Nationality	Player	Team	Score	Opponents	Date	Ref.
2022–23 Premier League
August	2022	England	Nick Pope (1)	Newcastle United	0–0	Brighton & Hove Albion	13 August 2022	
September	2022	England	Jordan Pickford (1)	Everton	0–0	Liverpool	3 September 2022	
October	2022	Spain	Kepa Arrizabalaga (1)	Chelsea	2–0	Aston Villa	16 October 2022	
November/ December (Note: The Premier League was on hold during the 2022 FIFA World Cup, so November and December were treated as one month.)	2022	Republic of Ireland	Gavin Bazunu	Southampton	1–3	Liverpool	12 November 2022	
January	2023	England	Nick Pope (2)	Newcastle United	0–0	Crystal Palace	21 January 2023	
February	2023	Spain	David de Gea	Manchester United	3–0	Leicester City	19 February 2023	
March	2023	England	Aaron Ramsdale (1)	Arsenal	3–2	Bournemouth	4 March 2023	
April	2023	England	Aaron Ramsdale (2)	Arsenal	2–2	Liverpool	9 April 2023	
2023–24 Premier League
August	2023	Brazil	Alisson	Liverpool	2–1	Newcastle United	27 August 2023	
September	2023	Spain	Robert Sánchez (1)	Chelsea	0–1	Aston Villa	24 September 2023	
October	2023	France	Alphonse Areola (1)	West Ham United	1–4	Aston Villa	22 October 2023	
November	2023	Belgium	Thomas Kaminski	Luton Town	2–1	Crystal Palace	25 November 2023	
December	2023	England	Wes Foderingham	Sheffield United	0–2	Liverpool	6 December 2023	
January	2024	England	Jordan Pickford (2)	Everton	0–0	Fulham	30 January 2024	
February	2024	Netherlands	Mark Flekken	Brentford	2–0	Wolverhampton Wanderers	10 February 2024	
March	2024	Belgium	Matz Sels	Nottingham Forest	0–1	Liverpool	2 March 2024	
April	2024	Cameroon	André Onana (1)	Manchester United	1–1	Burnley	27 April 2024	
2024–25 Premier League
August	2024	Spain	David Raya (1)	Arsenal	2–0	Aston Villa	24 August 2024	
September	2024	Cameroon	André Onana (2)	Manchester United	0–0	Crystal Palace	21 September 2024	
October	2024	Spain	Robert Sánchez (2)	Chelsea	1–1	Nottingham Forest	6 October 2024	
November	2024	Cameroon	André Onana (3)	Manchester United	1–1	Ipswich Town	24 November 2024	
December	2024	Argentina	Emiliano Martínez	Aston Villa	1–2	Nottingham Forest	14 December 2024	
January	2025	Slovakia	Martin Dúbravka (1)	Newcastle United	3–0	Wolverhampton Wanderers	15 January 2025	
February	2025	Spain	Kepa Arrizabalaga (2)	Bournemouth	0–1	Wolverhampton Wanderers	22 February 2025	
March	2025	Spain	David Raya (2)	Arsenal	1–1	Manchester United	9 March 2025	
April	2025	Italy	Guglielmo Vicario	Tottenham Hotspur	0–1	Chelsea	3 April 2025	
2025–26 Premier League
August	2025	England	James Trafford	Manchester City	1–2	Brighton & Hove Albion	31 August 2025	
September	2025	Italy	Gianluigi Donnarumma	Manchester City	3–0	Manchester United	14 September 2025	
October	2025	Slovakia	Martin Dúbravka (2)	Burnley	3–2	Wolverhampton Wanderers	26 October 2025	
November	2025	England	Jordan Pickford (3)	Everton	1–0	Manchester United	24 November 2025	
December	2025	Spain	David Raya (3)	Arsenal	2–1	Brighton & Hove Albion	27 December 2025	
January	2026	France	Alphonse Areola (2)	West Ham United	0–3	Wolverhampton Wanderers	3 January 2026	
February	2026	England	Jordan Pickford (4)	Everton	3–2	Newcastle United	28 February 2026	
March	2026	England	Aaron Ramsdale (3)	Newcastle United	2–1	Manchester United	4 March 2026	
April	2026	Wales	Karl Darlow	Leeds United	3–0	Wolverhampton Wanderers	18 April 2026	
2026–27 Premier League
August	2026	England	Jordan Pickford (5)	Everton	2–0	Crystal Palace	22 August 2026	
September	2026	Spain	David Raya (4)	Arsenal	2–0	Sunderland	12 September 2026	
October	2026	Belgium	Mike Penders	Chelsea	2–0	Manchester United	31 October 2026	

1. Player's team's score listed first.

== Multiple winners ==
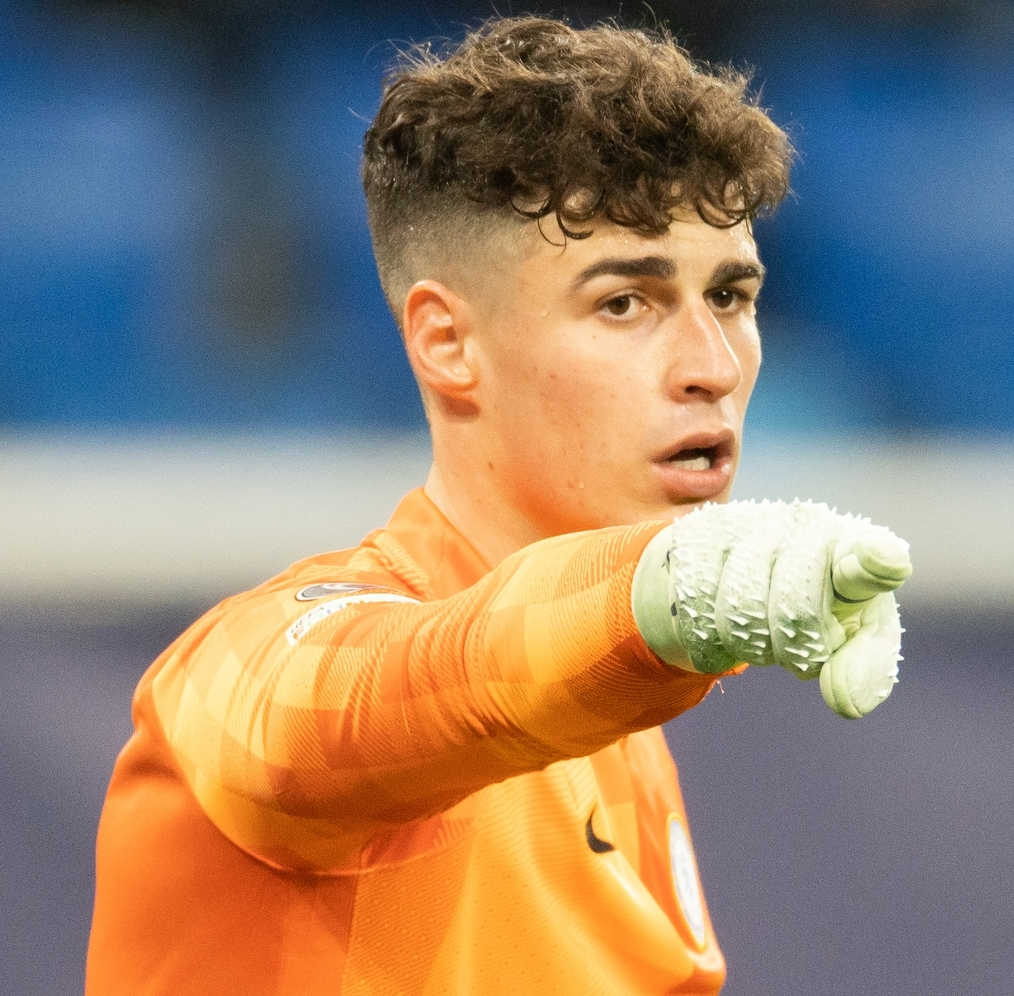
Kepa Arrizabalaga is the first player to have won the award with different clubs, having won with Chelsea and Bournemouth.

As of October 2026 award

The following table lists the number of awards won by players who have won at least two Save of the Month awards.

Players in bold are still active in the Premier League.

Rank	Player	Wins
1st	(England) **Jordan Pickford**	5
2nd	(Spain) **David Raya**	4
3rd	(Cameroon) André Onana	3
3rd	(England) Aaron Ramsdale	3
5th	(France) Alphonse Areola	2
5th	(Spain) **Kepa Arrizabalaga**	2
5th	(Slovakia) **Martin Dúbravka**	2
5th	(England) **Nick Pope**	2
5th	(Spain) Robert Sánchez	2

== Awards won by club ==
As of October 2026 award

Club	Players	Wins
Arsenal	2	6
Everton	1	5
Chelsea	3	4
Newcastle United	3	4
Manchester United	2	4
Manchester City	2	2
West Ham United	1	2
Aston Villa	1	1
Bournemouth	1	1
Brentford	1	1
Burnley	1	1
Leeds United	1	1
Liverpool	1	1
Luton Town	1	1
Nottingham Forest	1	1
Sheffield United	1	1
Southampton	1	1
Tottenham Hotspur	1	1

== Awards won by nationality ==
As of October 2026 award

Country	Players	Wins
England	5	12
Spain	4	9
Belgium	3	3
Cameroon	1	3
Italy	2	2
France	1	2
Slovakia	1	2
Argentina	1	1
Brazil	1	1
Republic of Ireland	1	1
Netherlands	1	1
Wales	1	1

== See also ==
- Premier League Save of the Season
- Premier League Goal of the Month
- Premier League Player of the Month
- Premier League Manager of the Month
