= Thomas Kaminski =

Belgian footballer (born 1992)

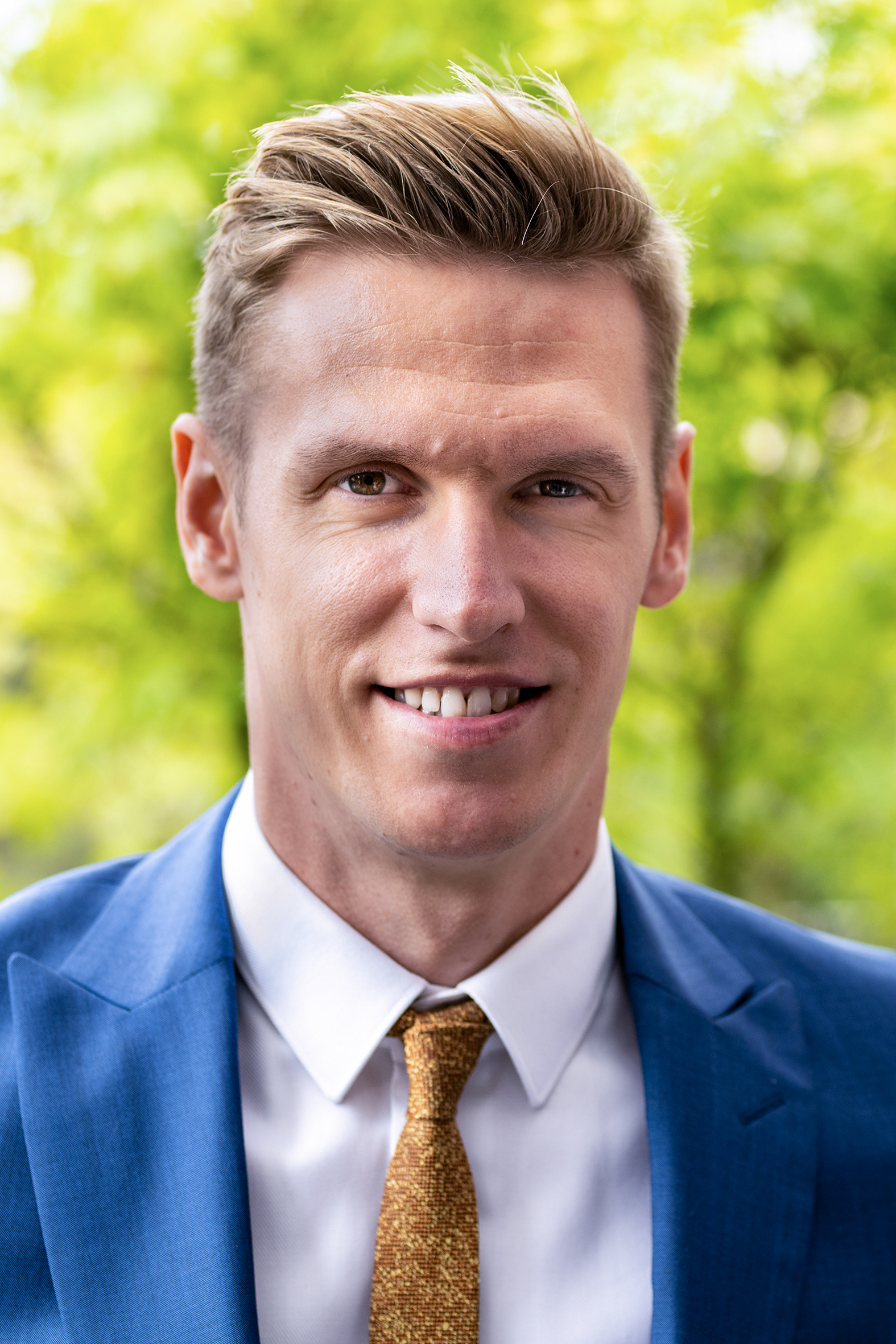
- Kaminski in 2022

Personal information
- Full name: Thomas Kaminski
- Date of birth: 23 October 1992 (age 34)
- Place of birth: Dendermonde, Belgium
- Height: 1.90 m (6 ft 3 in)
- Position: Goalkeeper

Team information
- Current team: Omonia (on loan from Charlton Athletic)
- Number: 1

Youth career
- 2000–2002: Zellik Sport
- 2002–2004: Asse-Zellik
- 2004–2005: Tubize
- 2005–2008: Gent

Senior career*
Years	Team	Apps	(Gls)
2008–2011	Germinal Beerschot	38	(0)
2011–2012	OH Leuven	25	(0)
2012–2016	Anderlecht	13	(0)
2014–2015	→ Anorthosis (loan)	30	(0)
2015–2016	→ Copenhagen (loan)	2	(0)
2016–2019	Kortrijk	84	(0)
2019–2020	Gent	49	(0)
2020–2023	Blackburn Rovers	115	(0)
2023–2025	Luton Town	83	(0)
2025–	Charlton Athletic	37	(0)
2026–	→ Omonia (loan)	6	(0)

International career^{‡}
2007	Belgium U15	1	(0)
2007–2008	Belgium U16	6	(0)
2008–2009	Belgium U17	9	(0)
2009–2011	Belgium U19	12	(0)
2011–2013	Belgium U21	5	(0)
2024	Belgium	1	(0)
- * Club domestic league appearances and goals as of 22:10, 20 October 2026 (UTC) ‡ National team caps and goals as of 17:10, 8 September 2026 (UTC)

Thomas Kaminski (Polish: Tomasz Kaminski; born 23 October 1992) is a Belgian professional footballer who plays as a goalkeeper for Omonia on loan from EFL Championship club Charlton Athletic.

== Club career ==
=== Germinal Beerschot ===
Kaminski debuted in the Belgian top league for Germinal Beerschot in May 2009. He became the starting goalkeeper in the 2010–11 season.

=== OH Leuven ===
In August 2011, Kaminski signed a one-year contract with Oud-Heverlee Leuven.

=== Anderlecht ===
He also signed an agreement which tied him to Anderlecht at the end of that season. He played his first match for Anderlecht on 25 August 2012 against Oud-Heverlee Leuven. In summer 2015, Kaminski was loaned by F.C. Copenhagen.

=== Blackburn Rovers ===
On 26 August 2020, Kaminski joined EFL Championship side Blackburn Rovers for an undisclosed fee. Kaminski signed a two-year deal with the club, with the option of a further year.

After his move to England, Kaminski was required to go into quarantine as part of the UK's COVID-19 measures at the time. He went on to make his Championship debut for Blackburn on 12 September, in the club's 3–2 defeat by Bournemouth. By the end of Blackburn's 2020–21 season, Kaminski appeared for the club competitively on 44 occasions, with Kaminski's impressive performances during the season seeing him become a fan-favourite of the Rovers supporters and being named as Player of the Season. In February 2022, he signed a contract extension until the end of the 2024–25 season.

=== Luton Town ===
In August 2023, Kaminski signed for newly promoted Luton Town ahead of their first top-flight campaign since the 1991–92 season. He won the Premier League Save of the Season award after the campaign for his save against Crystal Palace on 25 November 2023.

=== Charlton Athletic ===
On 1 July 2025, Kaminski signed for Charlton Athletic on a three-year contract.

==== Omonia (loan) ====
On 28 August 2026, Kaminski joined Omonia on a season-long loan with an option to purchase and sign him for a further two years.

== International career ==
=== Youth ===
Despite having represented Belgium's youth teams at its U15, U16, U17, U19 and U21 levels, Kaminski is also eligible to play for Poland due to his father being of Polish descent.

=== Senior ===
In May 2013, Kaminski received his first call-up the Belgian senior squad for a friendly match against the United States, but remained on the bench. Exactly one year later, prior to the start of Belgium's 2014 FIFA World Cup campaign, he was called up to the national team's senior side again after Thibaut Courtois was rested following his appearance in the 2014 UEFA Champions League Final and injuries to Koen Casteels, Silvio Proto and Simon Mignolet left the side with no other available options. Kaminski made the bench for Belgium's 5–1 friendly victory against Luxembourg in a friendly match on 26 May 2014, but the record of the match was dismissed by FIFA due to the side making seven substitutes instead of the maximum six substitutes permitted.

On 9 November 2020, Kaminski was called up due to the injury of Anderlecht goalkeeper Hendrik Van Crombrugge, but forced to withdraw two days later after testing positive for COVID-19.

On 19 March 2021, Kaminski was called up yet again by Roberto Martínez, for the nation's 2022 FIFA World Cup qualifiers against Wales, Czech Republic and Belarus. He was called up for the sixth time in under one year as he was named as part of Martínez's squad for the national team's upcoming World Cup qualifiers against Estonia and the Czech Republic in August.

On 23 March 2024, Kaminski debuted for the Belgian senior squad in a friendly match against the Republic of Ireland, as a late substitute for Matz Sels.

== Personal life ==
Kaminski was born in Belgium to a Polish father and a Belgian mother.

== Career statistics ==
=== Club ===
As of match played 5 November 2026

Appearances and goals by club, season and competition
Club	Season	League			National cup (Note: Includes Belgian Cup, Cypriot Cup, Danish Cup, FA Cup, Cypriot Cup)		League cup (Note: Includes EFL Cup)		Other		Total	
Club	Season	Division	Apps	Goals	Apps	Goals	Apps	Goals	Apps	Goals	Apps	Goals
Germinal Beerschot	2008–09	Belgian Pro League	2	0	0	0	—		—		2	0
Germinal Beerschot	2009–10	Belgian Pro League	4	0	0	0	—		—		4	0
Germinal Beerschot	2010–11	Belgian Pro League	30	0	4	0	—		—		34	0
Germinal Beerschot	2011–12	Belgian Pro League	2	0	0	0	—		—		2	0
Germinal Beerschot	Total		38	0	4	0	—		—		42	0
OH Leuven	2011–12	Belgian Pro League	25	0	1	0	—		—		26	0
Anderlecht	2012–13	Belgian Pro League	1	0	2	0	—		0	0	3	0
Anderlecht	2013–14	Belgian Pro League	10	0	2	0	—		3 (Note: Appearances in UEFA Champions League)	0	15	0
Anderlecht	2014–15	Belgian Pro League	2	0	0	0	—		1 (Note: Appearance in Belgian Super Cup)	0	3	0
Anderlecht	2015–16	Belgian Pro League	0	0	0	0	—		0	0	0	0
Anderlecht	Total		13	0	4	0	—		4	0	21	0
Anorthosis Famagusta (loan)	2014–15	Cypriot First Division	30	0	2	0	—		—		32	0
Copenhagen (loan)	2015–16	Danish Superliga	2	0	5	0	—		—		7	0
Kortrijk	2016–17	Belgian Pro League	32	0	0	0	—		—		32	0
Kortrijk	2017–18	Belgian Pro League	34	0	4	0	—		—		38	0
Kortrijk	2018–19	Belgian Pro League	18	0	1	0	—		—		19	0
Kortrijk	Total		84	0	5	0	—		—		89	0
Gent	2018–19	Belgian Pro League	19	0	3	0	—		—		22	0
Gent	2019–20	Belgian Pro League	29	0	1	0	—		14 (Note: Appearances in UEFA Europa League)	0	33	0
Gent	2020–21	Belgian Pro League	1	0	0	0	—		—		1	0
Gent	Total		49	0	4	0	—		14	0	67	0
Blackburn Rovers	2020–21	Championship	43	0	0	0	1	0	—		44	0
Blackburn Rovers	2021–22	Championship	44	0	0	0	1	0	—		22	0
Blackburn Rovers	2022–23	Championship	28	0	1	0	0	0	—		29	0
Blackburn Rovers	Total		115	0	1	0	2	0	—		118	0
Luton Town	2023–24	Premier League	38	0	0	0	0	0	—		38	0
Luton Town	2024–25	Championship	45	0	1	0	1	0	—		47	0
Luton Town	Total		83	0	1	0	1	0	—		85	0
Charlton Athletic	2025–26	Championship	37	0	0	0	0	0	—		37	0
Charlton Athletic	2026–27	Championship	0	0	0	0	0	0	—		0	0
Charlton Athletic	Total		37	0	0	0	0	0	—		37	0
Omonia (loan)	2026–27	Cypriot First Division	6	0	0	0	—		1	0	7	0
Career total			482	0	27	0	3	0	19	0	531	0

== Honours ==
Anderlecht

- Belgian Pro League: 2012–13, 2013–14
- Belgian Super Cup: 2012, 2013, 2014

Copenhagen

- Danish Superliga: 2015–16
- Danish Cup: 2015–16

Individual

- Premier League Save of the Season: 2023–24
- Premier League Save of the Month: November 2023
- Blackburn Rovers Player of the Season: 2020–21
