= Kepa Arrizabalaga =

Spanish footballer (born 1994)

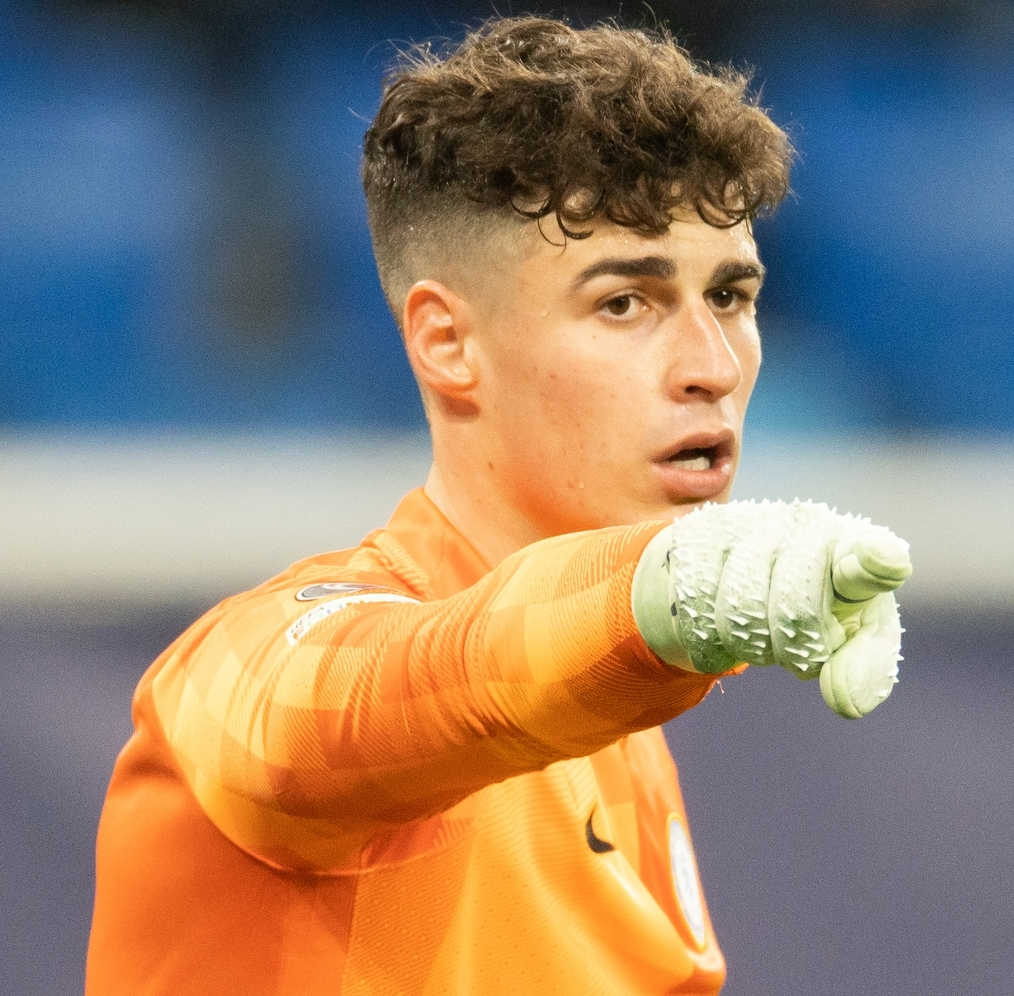
- Kepa playing for Chelsea in 2021

Personal information
- Full name: Kepa Arrizabalaga Revuelta
- Date of birth: 3 October 1994 (age 32)
- Place of birth: Ondarroa, Spain
- Height: 1.89 m (6 ft 2 in)
- Position: Goalkeeper

Team information
- Current team: Arsenal
- Number: 13

Youth career
- 2004–2011: Athletic Bilbao

Senior career*
Years	Team	Apps	(Gls)
2011–2013	Basconia	31	(0)
2013–2015	Athletic Bilbao B	50	(0)
2015–2018	Athletic Bilbao	53	(0)
2015	→ Ponferradina (loan)	20	(0)
2015–2016	→ Valladolid (loan)	39	(0)
2018–2025	Chelsea	109	(0)
2023–2024	→ Real Madrid (loan)	14	(0)
2024–2025	→ Bournemouth (loan)	31	(0)
2025–	Arsenal	2	(0)

International career^{‡}
2012	Spain U18	2	(0)
2012	Spain U19	6	(0)
2013–2017	Spain U21	22	(0)
2017–2023	Spain	13	(0)
2026–	Basque Country	1	(0)
Medal record
Representing Spain
UEFA Nations League
Winner	2023 Netherlands
UEFA European Under-21 Championship
Runner-up	2017 Poland
UEFA European Under-19 Championship
Winner	2012 Estonia
- * Club domestic league appearances and goals as of 19:29, 21 November 2026 (UTC) ‡ National team caps and goals as of 23:34, 14 November 2026 (UTC)

Kepa Arrizabalaga Revuelta (born 3 October 1994), often referred to simply as Kepa, is a Spanish professional footballer who plays as a goalkeeper for Premier League club Arsenal.

After progressing through Athletic Bilbao's youth academy including their farm and reserve teams, he played for Ponferradina and Real Valladolid on consecutive loans between 2015 and 2016, after which he became a first-team regular at Athletic. In 2018, he moved to Chelsea in a transfer worth €80 million (£72 million), a record fee for a goalkeeper. There, he won the UEFA Europa League, the UEFA Champions League and the UEFA Super Cup. After inconsistent performances, he joined Real Madrid on loan in 2023, where he won La Liga and the Champions League. Following another loan stint, this time at fellow Premier League club Bournemouth, he moved to rival Arsenal on a permanent deal.

Kepa won the 2012 European Under-19 Championship with Spain's under-19 team. He made his senior debut in 2017, and was part of the national squad for the 2018 World Cup, although he did not make an appearance at the tournament.

== Club career ==
=== Athletic Bilbao ===
Born in Ondarroa, Biscay, Basque Country, Kepa joined Athletic Bilbao's youth setup at Lezama in 2004, aged ten. He made his senior debut with farm team Basconia in January 2012, in Tercera División.

On 5 May 2012, Kepa was called up to the main squad for a La Liga match against Getafe, but remained unused in the 0–0 draw at the San Mamés Stadium. He was also called up to pre-season in July, and on 23 September was also a substitute in another home game of the same outcome, against Málaga.

Kepa was promoted to Athletic's reserve team in January 2013, to cover for injured Jon Ander Serantes. He made his debut for the B-side on 16 February 2013, keeping a clean sheet in a 1–0 win over Logroñés in the Segunda División B. On 3 March, he was one of two players sent off towards the end of a 3–1 home win over Amorebieta, as well as teammate Jon García; in April, he suffered a pubalgia, only returning to the field in September.

Kepa appeared regularly for the B's after his return, but broke the first metacarpal of his right hand in January 2014, being sidelined for a month. On 11 March, Getafe submitted a loan request to the Lions for him, as a replacement to injured Miguel Ángel Moyá, but it was rejected a day later.

On 5 January 2015, Kepa was loaned to Segunda División club Ponferradina until June. He made his professional debut six days laer, starting in a 1–1 home draw against Racing Santander.

On 20 July 2015, Kepa moved to Real Valladolid, also of the second tier, in a season-long loan deal. He played his first competitive game on 22 August, in a 0–1 loss at Córdoba, and missed only three matches as his team finished 16th.

After returning from loan, Kepa was included in the first team squad, initially as third-choice behind Gorka Iraizoz and Iago Herrerín. He made his debut in the top flight on 11 September 2016, starting in a 1–0 away win over Deportivo de La Coruña.

On 22 January 2018, amid heavy transfer speculation linking him to Real Madrid, Kepa renewed his contract – due to expire that June – until 2025.

=== Chelsea ===
==== 2018–19: Debut season, UEFA Europa League victory ====
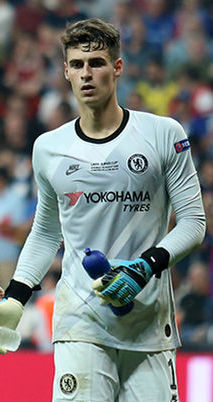
Kepa playing for Chelsea in the 2019 UEFA Super Cup

On 8 August 2018, Athletic Bilbao announced on their website that Kepa had paid his required release clause (€80 million / £71.6 million), making him the world's most expensive goalkeeper only weeks after the record was set by Alisson's transfer to Liverpool. Later that day, his move to Chelsea on a seven-year contract was confirmed, replacing Thibaut Courtois who had departed for Real Madrid. He made his Premier League debut three days later in a 3–0 away win against Huddersfield Town, going on to keep six clean sheets in the team's 12-match unbeaten run in the league, before a 3–1 defeat at the hands of Tottenham Hotspur.

On 24 January 2019, in the second leg of the EFL Cup semi-final, Kepa saved a penalty from Tottenham's Lucas Moura in a 4–2 penalty shoot-out win at Stamford Bridge, helping his team go through to the final.

On 24 February 2019, during the 2019 EFL Cup Final against Manchester City, with the match at 0–0 near the end of extra time, Maurizio Sarri called for Kepa to be substituted off for Willy Caballero for the upcoming penalty shootout. Kepa refused to be substituted, gesticulating and remaining on the field. During the shootout, he saved one penalty as Chelsea lost 4–3. After the game, both Kepa and Sarri said that the situation was a misunderstanding, with Sarri incorrectly believing that Kepa was too injured with cramp to continue. Later on, Kepa met with Sarri and apologised to him and to the rest of the club. He was fined a week's worth of pay as a result of his actions, with Sarri leaving the decision of any further discipline up to the club. Kepa was dropped from the starting lineup for Caballero in Chelsea's next match, a Premier League game against Tottenham. He returned to the lineup for the following match.

On 9 May 2019, Kepa saved two penalties in the shootout at the end of the second leg of the UEFA Europa League semi-final against Eintracht Frankfurt to take Chelsea to the final, which they won 4–1 over Arsenal.

==== 2019–21: Struggles, UEFA Champions League win ====
Under the management of Frank Lampard, Chelsea failed to win any trophies. Throughout the 2019–20 season, Kepa struggled to stay in form, eventually being benched in favour of Willy Caballero in late January 2020 in a cup match against Hull City. Kepa remained outside of the starting eleven during the next four league matches and a Champions League match. He regained his starting spot on 4 March during the FA Cup fifth round against Liverpool where he made a string of saves to deny the eventual Premier League champions; Chelsea went on to win the match 2–0. But he would find himself benched to end the season, missing out on the team's run to the final of the FA Cup. During the second half of the season, Kepa faced abuse from Chelsea fans which led to him turning off comments on social media.

Kepa appeared for Chelsea in the opening game of the 2020–21 Premier League season against Brighton & Hove Albion. Chelsea won 3–1. Kepa was judged to have made a significant error in the next match against Liverpool, after his pass went straight to Sadio Mané who collected the ball and scored; Chelsea went on to lose 2–0. Lampard publicly criticized Kepa, stating that his mistake had cost a goal.

On 24 September, Chelsea signed Édouard Mendy from Rennes, and Kepa was relegated to the bench. He did not feature again until 17 October against Southampton where his performance received further criticism in the media as the side drew 3–3. On 10 January 2021, Kepa marked his 100th appearance for the club in a 4–0 home win against Morecambe in the fourth round of the FA Cup.

Kepa's fortunes turned under the coaching of Thomas Tuchel. He kept five clean sheets in eight games, all of which came in successive games. He had a save percentage of 89.4% under the German manager, significantly higher than under the previous manager. He was named as part of the 25-man squad for the 2021 UEFA Champions League Final on 29 May, and was an unused substitute as Chelsea beat Manchester City 1–0 at the Estádio do Dragão, lifting his second European trophy.

==== 2021–22: Super Cup win and EFL Cup final defeat ====
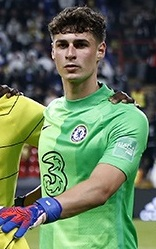
Kepa playing for Chelsea in the 2022 FIFA Club World Cup.

In the 2021 UEFA Super Cup against Villarreal, Kepa came on as a substitute in the 119th minute to replace first-choice goalkeeper Mendy. He saved two penalties, including the decisive attempt from Villarreal captain Raúl Albiol, in the shootout as Chelsea won their second Super Cup title. The Spaniard got a start against Tottenham Hotspur, keeping a clean sheet. Later in the season, Kepa started only a few matches including an EFL Cup third round tie against Aston Villa, which Chelsea would go on to win 4–3 on penalties after a 1–1 draw. Kepa made a decisive save against a spot kick from Marvelous Nakamba, leading him to become Chelsea's most successful goalkeeper at saving penalties during shootouts, passing Petr Čech.

During January 2022, following Mendy’s departure to the AFCON, Kepa was reinstated to the first team. The Spaniard took his team to the final of the EFL Cup, notably thanks to his quick thinking to trap Harry Kane offside. He then went on to have another excellent performance in the 2021 FIFA Club World Cup semi-final, as Chelsea went on to win the tournament. On 27 February, in the EFL Cup Final, Kepa came on in the 120th minute, ready for the penalty shootout. Despite this, he failed to save a single penalty and was the only player who failed to convert his penalty, blasting his kick over the crossbar as Liverpool won the shootout 11–10.

==== 2022–23: Re-emergence ====
In 2022, Chelsea replaced Tuchel with new manager Graham Potter, and also brought in new goalkeeping coach Ben Roberts. This coincided with Mendy, who was Tuchel's preferred goalkeeper, being injured and in poor form. Kepa contributed to a draw in Potter's first game with a save to deny Benjamin Šeško, but this was followed by a game cancelation and an international break. Kepa continued in the team in the next game against Crystal Palace, a 2–1 win. He kept his place in the squad with a run of five consecutive clean sheets, including impressive away displays at Aston Villa and Brentford, the latter of which being his 50th for Chelsea. After having gone 10 hours without conceding, Kepa conceded a last-minute header against Manchester United. Following the turn of the year, he won three back-to-back Man of the Match awards, following clean sheets against Crystal Palace, Liverpool, and Fulham.

Kepa finished the season with the third best save percentage in the league, having also kept out the third most shots based on the Expected Goals model. One of the saves he made in the aforementioned clean sheet at Aston Villa in October won the Premier League Save of the Season award.

==== 2023–24: Loan to Real Madrid ====
On 14 August 2023, Real Madrid announced the signing of Kepa from Chelsea on a one-year loan deal. The move was initiated in response to a long-term injury sustained by their primary goalkeeper, Thibaut Courtois. The following day, Kepa was unveiled by Real Madrid president Florentino Pérez at the Ciudad Real Madrid.

On 25 August 2023, Kepa made his debut for the club in a 1–0 away win over Celta Vigo, simultaneously keeping his first clean sheet for Carlo Ancelotti's side.

After starting thirteen consecutive matches for Real Madrid, Kepa suffered an adductor injury warming up for the Champions League group match against Braga on 8 November. After returning from injury against Union Berlin on 12 December, Kepa rotated with in-form Ukrainian goalkeeper Andriy Lunin, with the latter being selected to start in the 2024 Supercopa de España final against Barcelona after an error from Kepa resulted in an Antonio Rüdiger own goal in the semi-final against Atlético de Madrid. Lunin remained coach Carlo Ancelotti's first choice goalkeeper until the return to fitness of Courtois in April 2024. Kepa's final appearance of his loan spell came as a substitute on the last day of the La Liga season, playing 27 minutes against Real Betis at the Santiago Bernabéu.

Kepa returned to Chelsea at the end of the season, having played twenty matches for Real Madrid and winning the La Liga, Supercopa de España and UEFA Champions League titles.

==== 2024–25: Loan to Bournemouth ====
On 29 August 2024, Kepa was loaned out to fellow Premier League club Bournemouth until the end of the 2024–25 season. He replaced Neto, who joined Arsenal on a season-long loan the following day.

He made his debut for Bournemouth in a 3–2 win at Everton on 31 August. His first clean sheet for the Cherries came on 19 October in a 2–0 home win over Arsenal.

=== Arsenal ===
On 1 July 2025, Kepa signed for fellow Premier League club Arsenal after they reportedly met the £5 million release clause in his Chelsea contract. He reportedly signed a three-year contract.

Kepa made his competitive debut for Arsenal in an EFL Cup victory away at Port Vale, keeping a clean sheet in the process. Kepa made six saves in the following round against Brighton, and kept another clean sheet in the 2–0 win.

On 28 January 2026, Kepa made his first UEFA Champions League appearance for Arsenal, as the Gunners beat FC Kairat 3–2 at Emirates Stadium to make it eight wins out of eight in the league phase.

Kepa started all of Arsenal’s domestic cup games in his first season, as the Gunners reached the quarter-finals of the FA Cup and the final of the EFL Cup. In the EFL Cup final on 22 March, Kepa made an error in the lead-up to the tie’s first goal, letting Rayan Cherki’s cross slip through his hands, which allowed Nico O'Reilly to head in to the empty goal from close range. Manchester City went on to win the final 2–0.

On 24 May, Kepa made his first Premier League appearance for Arsenal in their 2–1 final day win against Crystal Palace at Selhurst Park, where Arsenal were presented the Premier League trophy after the game.

== International career ==
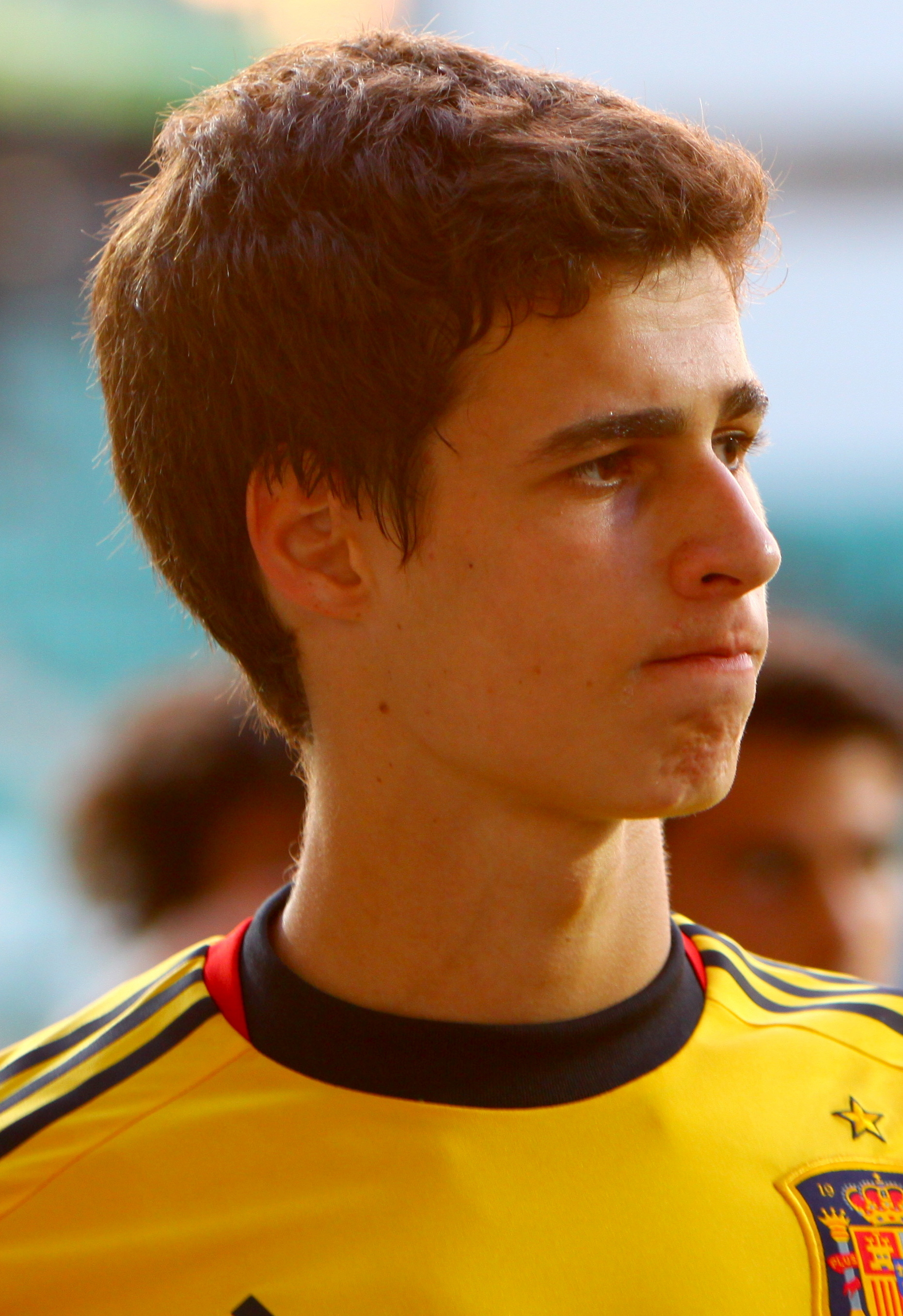
Kepa with Spain U19 in 2012

After appearing for Spain's under-18s, Kepa was called up to the under-19 team for that year's UEFA European Championship. He was the starter during the tournament, as his side were crowned champions; highlights included a 3–3 semi-final success against France, where he saved two penalties in the shootout.

Kepa missed the 2013 FIFA U-20 World Cup due to injury, being replaced in the tournament squad by Rubén Yáñez. On 8 November 2013, he was called up to the under-21 team, along with Athletic teammate Iker Muniain.

Kepa was called up to the senior side on 22 March 2017 ahead of a 2018 FIFA World Cup qualifier against Israel and a friendly with France, as a late replacement for the injured Pepe Reina. He earned his first cap on 11 November of that year, playing the full 90 minutes in a 5–0 friendly win over Costa Rica in Málaga.

Kepa was named in Spain's 23-man squad for the 2018 FIFA World Cup in Russia, although he did not play in the tournament.

== Style of play ==
Early in his career, Kepa was regarded as one of the most promising young goalkeepers in Europe, known for his consistency, speed, agility, shot-stopping ability, and quick reflexes, enabling him to produce "brilliant saves." Kepa was also known for his footwork, distribution, and skill with the ball at his feet, as well as his ability to rush off his line, which allowed him to act as a sweeper keeper and play the ball out of the back in Maurizio Sarri's possession-based system that relied on a high back-line.

Former goalkeeper Manuel Almunia praised Kepa in 2017 as a goalkeeper with "good, strong feet" and "good movement," who was capable saving the ball with his feet, and also described him as a keeper who possessed "presence and character," also adding: "I'm sure he'll make a great keeper." In 2018, former Athletic Bilbao defender Andoni Goikoetxea described Kepa as being "good in the air," noting that "he jumps and catches the ball very well", while Richard Fitzpatrick of Bleacher Report described him as being "good at marshalling a defence."

Following a strong start to the first part of his debut season with Chelsea, Kepa came under criticism for his inconsistency and poor performances, as well as his low save-percentage. He ended the season strongly with a series of excellent performances, in particular en route to his club's Europa League victory. During his second season with Chelsea, he once again drew criticism over his shot-stopping ability and mistakes, which led to him being dropped by manager Frank Lampard for six matches. Kepa regained his starting position during the FA Cup tie against Liverpool later in the season. However, following more goalkeeping mistakes he was once again dropped for the final league match of the season and the FA Cup Final. He finished the season with the worst save percentage in Premier League history, an unwanted record eventually broken by Gavin Bazunu of Southampton.

During his re-emergence in subsequent seasons under different managers, Kepa was noted for his good distribution, a skill that would come in handy for English manager Graham Potter in 2022. He has also been praised for his good reflexes and decision making, particularly during a stretch of consecutive clean sheets for Potter.

== Personal life ==
Kepa married Spanish beauty pageant titleholder Andrea Martínez in 2023. They have twin daughters.

== Career statistics ==
=== Club ===
As of match played 21 November 2026

Appearances and goals by club, season and competition
Club	Season	League			National cup (Note: Includes Copa del Rey, FA Cup)		League cup (Note: Includes EFL Cup)		Europe		Other		Total	
Club	Season	Division	Apps	Goals	Apps	Goals	Apps	Goals	Apps	Goals	Apps	Goals	Apps	Goals
Basconia	2011–12	Tercera División	12	0	—		—		—		—		12	0
Basconia	2012–13	Tercera División	19	0	—		—		—		—		19	0
Basconia	Total		31	0	—		—		—		—		31	0
Athletic Bilbao B	2012–13	Segunda División B	7	0	—		—		—		0	0	7	0
Athletic Bilbao B	2013–14	Segunda División B	26	0	—		—		—		—		26	0
Athletic Bilbao B	2014–15	Segunda División B	17	0	—		—		—		0	0	17	0
Athletic Bilbao B	Total		50	0	—		—		—		0	0	50	0
Ponferradina (loan)	2014–15	Segunda División	20	0	0	0	—		—		—		20	0
Real Valladolid (loan)	2015–16	Segunda División	39	0	1	0	—		—		—		40	0
Athletic Bilbao	2016–17	La Liga	23	0	0	0	—		0	0	—		23	0
Athletic Bilbao	2017–18	La Liga	30	0	1	0	—		0	0	—		31	0
Athletic Bilbao	Total		53	0	1	0	—		0	0	—		54	0
Chelsea	2018–19	Premier League	36	0	1	0	4	0	13 (Note: Appearances in UEFA Europa League)	0	—		54	0
Chelsea	2019–20	Premier League	33	0	1	0	0	0	6 (Note: Appearance(s) in UEFA Champions League)	0	1 (Note: Appearance in UEFA Super Cup)	0	41	0
Chelsea	2020–21	Premier League	7	0	6	0	0	0	1	0	—		14	0
Chelsea	2021–22	Premier League	4	0	2	0	6	0	1	0	2 (Note: One appearance in UEFA Super Cup, one appearance in FIFA Club World Cup)	0	15	0
Chelsea	2022–23	Premier League	29	0	1	0	0	0	9	0	—		39	0
Chelsea	Total		109	0	11	0	10	0	30	0	3	0	163	0
Real Madrid (loan)	2023–24	La Liga	14	0	1	0	—		4	0	1 (Note: Appearance in Supercopa de España)	0	20	0
Bournemouth (loan)	2024–25	Premier League	31	0	4	0	—		—		—		35	0
Arsenal	2025–26	Premier League	1	0	4	0	6	0	1	0	—		12	0
Arsenal	2026–27	Premier League	1	0	0	0	1	0	0	0	0	0	2	0
Arsenal	Total		2	0	4	0	7	0	1	0	0	0	14	0
Career total			349	0	22	0	17	0	35	0	4	0	427	0

=== International ===
As of match played 28 March 2023

Appearances and goals by national team and year
National team	Year	Apps	Goals
Spain	2017	1	0
Spain	2018	2	0
Spain	2019	7	0
Spain	2020	1	0
Spain	2023	2	0
Total		13	0

== Honours ==
Chelsea

- UEFA Champions League: 2020–21
- UEFA Europa League: 2018–19
- UEFA Super Cup: 2021
- FIFA Club World Cup: 2021
- FA Cup runner-up: 2019–20, 2020–21, 2021–22
- EFL Cup runner-up: 2018–19, 2021–22

Real Madrid

- La Liga: 2023–24
- Supercopa de España: 2024
- UEFA Champions League: 2023–24

Arsenal

- Premier League: 2025–26
- FA Community Shield: 2026
- EFL Cup runner-up: 2025–26
- UEFA Champions League runner-up: 2025–26

Spain U19

- UEFA European Under-19 Championship: 2012

Spain U21

- UEFA European Under-21 Championship runner-up: 2017

Spain

- UEFA Nations League: 2022–23

Individual

- UEFA Europa League Squad of the Season: 2018–19
- Premier League Save of the Month: October 2022, February 2025
- Premier League Save of the Season: 2022–23
