= Kyle John =

English footballer (born 200?)

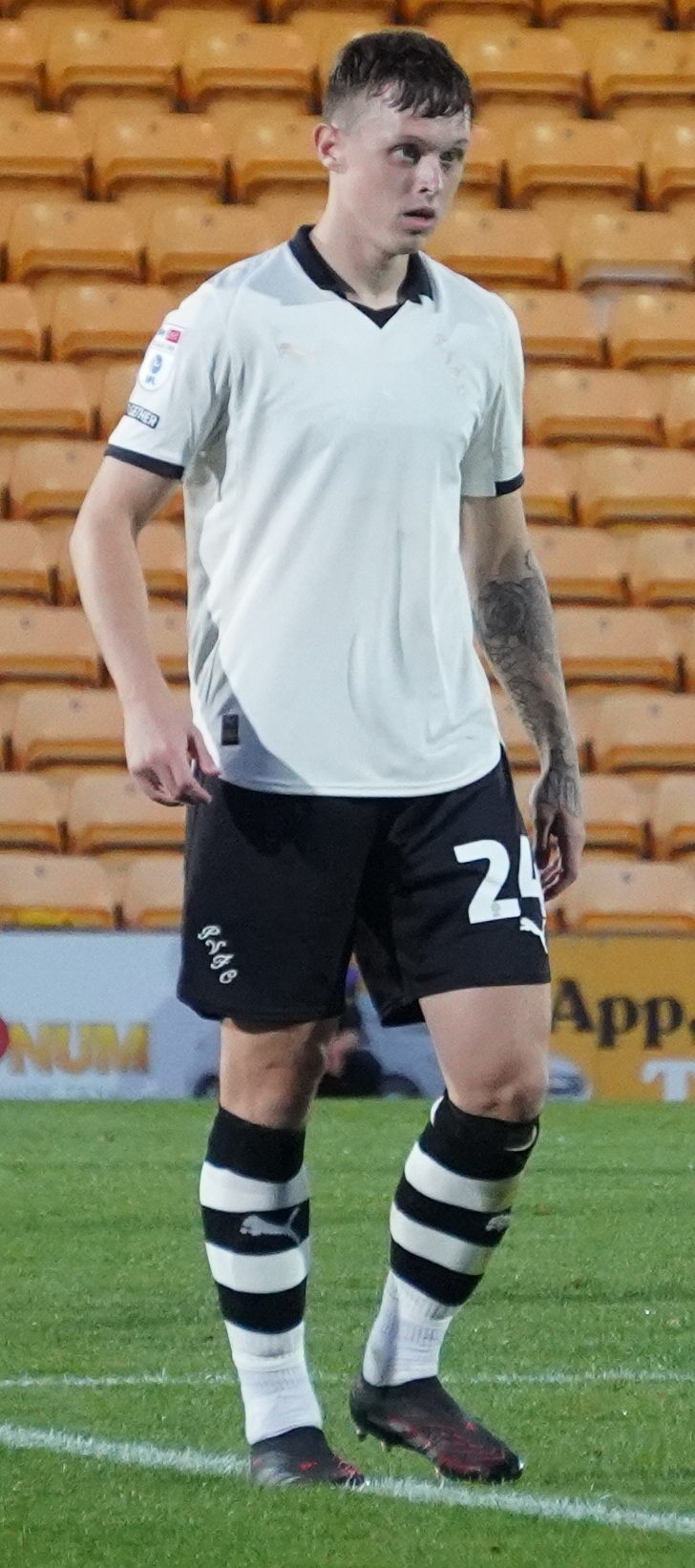
- John in Port Vale colours (2025)

Personal information
- Full name: Kyle Alex John
- Date of birth: 13 February 2001 (age 25)
- Place of birth: Chester, England
- Height: 1.76 m (5 ft 9 in)
- Position: Defender

Team information
- Current team: Port Vale
- Number: 2

Youth career
- 2007–2019: Everton

Senior career*
Years	Team	Apps	(Gls)
2019–2024	Everton	0	(0)
2024–	Port Vale	60	(1)
- * Club domestic league appearances and goals as of 15:36, 31 October 2026 (UTC)

Kyle Alex John (born 13 February 2001) is an English professional footballer who plays as a defender for EFL League Two club Port Vale.

John began his career at Everton, though he did not play a first-team game before being released at the end of the 2023–24 season. He then signed with Port Vale and was promoted out of League Two with the club at the end of the 2024–25 season. He was named as Port Vale Player of the Year for the 2025–26 season.

== Early and personal life ==
Kyle Alex John was born in Chester on 13 February 2001. He attended Blacon High School and joined the Academy at Everton at the age of six. In 2025, he had a partner and two children.

== Career ==
=== Everton ===
John began his time at the Everton academy as a right winger, then played as a striker, a centre midfielder and a number 10, before settling into the right-back role at the age of 16. After overcoming an ankle injury, John turned professional at Everton by signing a contract in March 2019. He signed a two-year contract in June 2021. He was due to leave Goodison Park on loan when he was instead called up to the Toffees first-team by manager Frank Lampard after impressing for Paul Tait's under-18 team and David Unsworth's under-23 team. Unsworth said he was a "class act" with a "very bright future". He also trained with the first-team under Carlo Ancelotti. John signed a two-year extension in October 2022. He was not sent out on loan and was instead released by manager Sean Dyche at the end of the 2023–24 season without having played a senior first-team game at the age of 23.

=== Port Vale ===
On 9 August 2024, John signed a one-year contract with Port Vale after impressing manager Darren Moore on trial. The Valiants had needed defensive cover at fullback following a long-term injury to Mitch Clark. John was voted as the Vale's man of the match in two of his first four games and readers of the Valiant substack voted him as their player of the month for September. His whole-hearted performances quickly made him a fan favourite at Vale Park as he established himself as the preferred choice at right wing-back. He was switched to left wing-back after Jaheim Headley picked up a long-term injury in January. He won the club's Young Player of the Year award at the end-of-season awards ceremony. He collected his award in a knee brace, however, as injury brought his season to a premature end. The club opted to activate the optional extension in his contract after promotion was secured at the end of the 2024–25 season. A new two-year deal, with the club option of a third, was then agreed upon in June.

John suffered a muscle strain in September 2025, which saw him ruled out of action for three weeks. He scored his first career goal on 31 January 2026, when his second-minute header secured a victory at Leyton Orient. He was voted as that month's joint-player of the month by readers of The Valiant substack. New manager Jon Brady was fulsome in his praise for John as one of the few bright sparks in a very poor season for the club. Brady gave John the captaincy following a long-term injury to Ben Garrity. He was again voted as player of the month by readers of the The Valiant substack for February, securing 68% of the vote. He missed the end-of-season run-in with a rib injury. He was named as Port Vale Player of the Year for the 2025–26 season, which culminated in relegation.

== Style of play ==
John is a combative defender. John, being a versatile player, can play anywhere in defence, though he is primarily a right-back.

== Career statistics ==
As of match played 31 October 2026

Appearances and goals by club, season and competition
Club	Season	League			FA Cup		EFL Cup		Other		Total	
Club	Season	Division	Apps	Goals	Apps	Goals	Apps	Goals	Apps	Goals	Apps	Goals
Everton U21	2018–19	—	—		—		—		1 (Note: Appearance(s) in the EFL Trophy)	0	1	0
Everton U21	2019–20	—	—		—		—		2	0	2	0
Everton U21	2020–21	—	—		—		—		0	0	0	0
Everton U21	2021–22	—	—		—		—		2	0	2	0
Everton U21	2022–23	—	—		—		—		3	0	3	0
Everton U21	2023–24	—	—		—		—		1	0	1	0
Everton U21	Total		0	0	0	0	0	0	9	0	9	0
Port Vale	2024–25	EFL League Two	28	0	0	0	1	0	2	0	31	0
Port Vale	2025–26	EFL League One	25	1	4	0	2	0	5	0	36	1
Port Vale	2026–27	EFL League Two	7	0	0	0	1	0	3	0	11	0
Port Vale	Total		60	1	4	0	4	0	10	0	78	1
Career total			60	1	4	0	4	0	19	0	87	1

== Honours ==
Port Vale

- EFL League Two second-place promotion: 2024–25

Individual

- Port Vale Player of the Year: 2025–26
