= Martin Sherif =

Dutch footballer (born 2006)

Personal information
- Date of birth: 10 June 2006 (age 20)
- Place of birth: Liberia
- Height: 6 ft 3 in (1.91 m)
- Position: Forward

Team information
- Current team: Everton
- Number: 67

Youth career
- –2016: Forza Almere
- 2016–2018: Almere City
- 2019–2025: Everton

Senior career*
Years	Team	Apps	(Gls)
2025–	Everton	0	(0)
2025	→ Rotherham United (loan)	7	(2)
2026	→ Port Vale (loan)	17	(2)

International career
2023	Netherlands U17	4	(0)
- * Club domestic league appearances and goals as of 16:02, 2 May 2026 (UTC)

Martin Sherif (born 10 June 2006) is a professional footballer who plays as a forward for Premier League club Everton. Born in Liberia, he is a Netherlands youth international up to under-17 level.

Sherif moved from Almere City to the Academy at Everton at age 13. He spent the first half of the 2025–26 season on loan at Rotherham United and the second half of the season on loan at Port Vale.

== Club career ==
As a youth player, Sherif joined the youth academy of Dutch side Forza Almere. In 2016, he joined the youth academy of Dutch side Almere City. At the age of 13, he joined the youth academy of English Premier League club Everton and was promoted to the club's reserve team in 2022. Dutch news website Voetbalzone wrote in 2025 that he was "regarded as one of Everton's greatest attacking talents". He became a regular in the U18 side under Paul Tait in 2021–22 and scored 14 goals under Leighton Baines in 2022–23. He scored a hat-trick against Derby County U18 in January 2023. He signed his first professional contract, a three-year deal, shortly after turning 17. He was described as "Sean Dyche's most promising academy prospect" after making what Rheinische Post called a "fearsome impression" in Germany at the Under-19s Champions Trophy in March 2024. He spent February 2025 in the first-team under David Moyes following injuries to Youssef Chermiti, Armando Broja and Dominic Calvert-Lewin.

On 18 August 2025, Sherif signed a season-long loan deal with League One club Rotherham United. Five days later, he scored on his professional debut in a 2–2 draw with Wigan Athletic. He missed September due to injury and was described as "a real game-changing option" by Millers manager Matt Hamshaw after he returned to fitness. On 2 October, he scored what the Rotherham Advertiser later described as "a well-timed glide and a neat finish" during a 2–2 home draw with Bradford City. However his time at the New York Stadium was plagued by hamstring issues that caused three prolonged absences. The injuries limited him to ten appearances in all competitions, of which three were league starts. He was recalled from his loan on New Year's Eve. On 1 February 2026, he returned to League One on loan at Port Vale until the end of the 2025–26 season, joining alongside Everton teammate Eli Campbell. He scored on his home debut at Vale Park, a stoppage-time equaliser in a 1–1 draw with Reading on 21 February. Manager Jon Brady stated that Everton had given the club "specific minutes" he could play in order to slowly strengthen his fitness as the season progressed.

On 12 August 2026, Sherif was charged with breaching betting rules by allegedly placing 61 bets on games between 20 November 2024 and 12 February 2026.

== International career ==
Sherif is a Netherlands youth international and is eligible to play for the Liberia national football team, having been born in the country. While playing for the Netherlands national under-17 football team, he played for them for 2023 UEFA European Under-17 Championship qualification and the 2023 UEFA European Under-17 Championship.

== Style of play ==
Sherif is a left-footed forward who is known for his shooting ability and strength. He can use this strength to hold the ball up. A confident player, he has described his playing style as "making loads of runs. Power. Strength. Goals. Especially goals."

== Career statistics ==
As of match played 2 May 2026

Appearances and goals by club, season and competition
Club	Season	League			FA Cup		EFL Cup		Other		Total	
Club	Season	Division	Apps	Goals	Apps	Goals	Apps	Goals	Apps	Goals	Apps	Goals
Everton	2024–25	Premier League	0	0	0	0	0	0	—		0	0
Everton	2025–26	Premier League	0	0	0	0	0	0	—		0	0
Everton	2026–27	Premier League	0	0	0	0	0	0	—		0	0
Everton	Total		0	0	0	0	0	0	0	0	0	0
Everton U23	2023–24	—			—		—		2 (Note: Appearance(s) in the EFL Trophy)	0	2	0
Everton U23	2024–25	—			—		—		1	1	1	1
Everton U23	Total		—		—		—		3	1	3	1
Rotherham United (loan)	2025–26	EFL League One	7	2	1	0	1	0	1	0	10	2
Port Vale (loan)	2025–26	EFL League One	17	2	2	0	—		0	0	19	2
Career total			24	4	3	0	1	0	4	1	32	5
