= 2025–26 Port Vale F.C. season =

114th season in existence of Port Vale FC

Port Vale F.C.
2025–26 season
- Owner: Synsol Holdings Limited
- Chairwoman: Carol Shanahan
- Manager: Darren Moore (until 28 December); Jamie Smith (caretaker manager 28 December – 6 January); Jon Brady (from 6 January)
- Stadium: Vale Park
- League One: 22nd (42 points)
- FA Cup: Quarter-finals (eliminated by Chelsea)
- EFL Cup: Third Round (eliminated by Arsenal)
- EFL Trophy: Quarter-finals (eliminated by Stockport County)
- Player of the Year: Kyle John
- Top goalscorer: League: Devante Cole (6); All: Devante Cole, Ben Waine (8 each)
- Highest home attendance: 16,326 vs. Arsenal, 24 September 2025
- Lowest home attendance: 636 vs. Barnsley, 2 December 2025
- Average home league attendance: 7,169
- Biggest win: 5–1 (twice)
- Biggest defeat: 7–0 vs. Chelsea, 4 April 2026
Home colours	Away colours

The 2025–26 season is the 114th season in the history of Port Vale Football Club and their first season back in League One since the 2023–24 season, following their promotion from League Two in the preceding season.

Manager Darren Moore signed nine permanent and three loan players, whilst allowing eight to leave and being forced to sell top scorer Lorent Tolaj to Plymouth Argyle after a release clause was triggered. They collected just two points from their opening six league games, though they did qualify for the third round of the EFL Cup, where they had a home tie with Arsenal. Vale put in a creditable performance in defeat to Arsenal, whilst claiming three straight league wins at the end of September as new signing Devante Cole hit form immediately. Only one goal scored in four October league games saw the Vale drop into the relegation zone. With one point and zero goals scored in November, the Vale fell to the bottom of the division. Moore left the club with Vale ten points from safety following a 5–0 defeat at Huddersfield Town on Boxing Day. He was succeeded by Jon Brady.

Brady oversaw progress in the cups and trimmed the squad in the January transfer window, though he lost top scorer Devante Cole in a late move. The team were beaten only once in six games in February, though they added only seven points to their tally and remained rooted to the bottom of the table. Despite indifferent league form continuing, Vale defeated Premier League side Sunderland to reach the quarter-finals of the FA Cup for only the second time in the club's history. Back to the league and they were relegated with three games left to play, with 12 players released and a further four transfer listed.

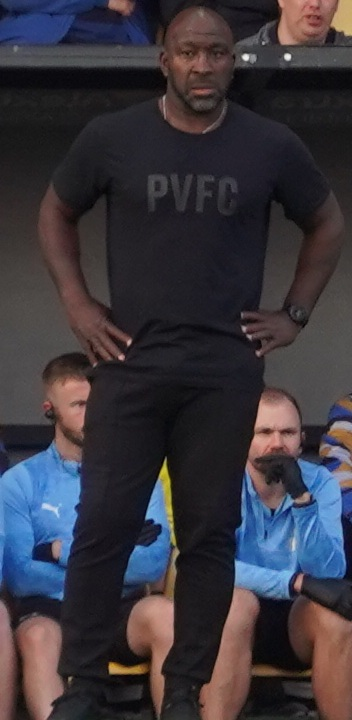
Darren Moore left the club at the end of December.

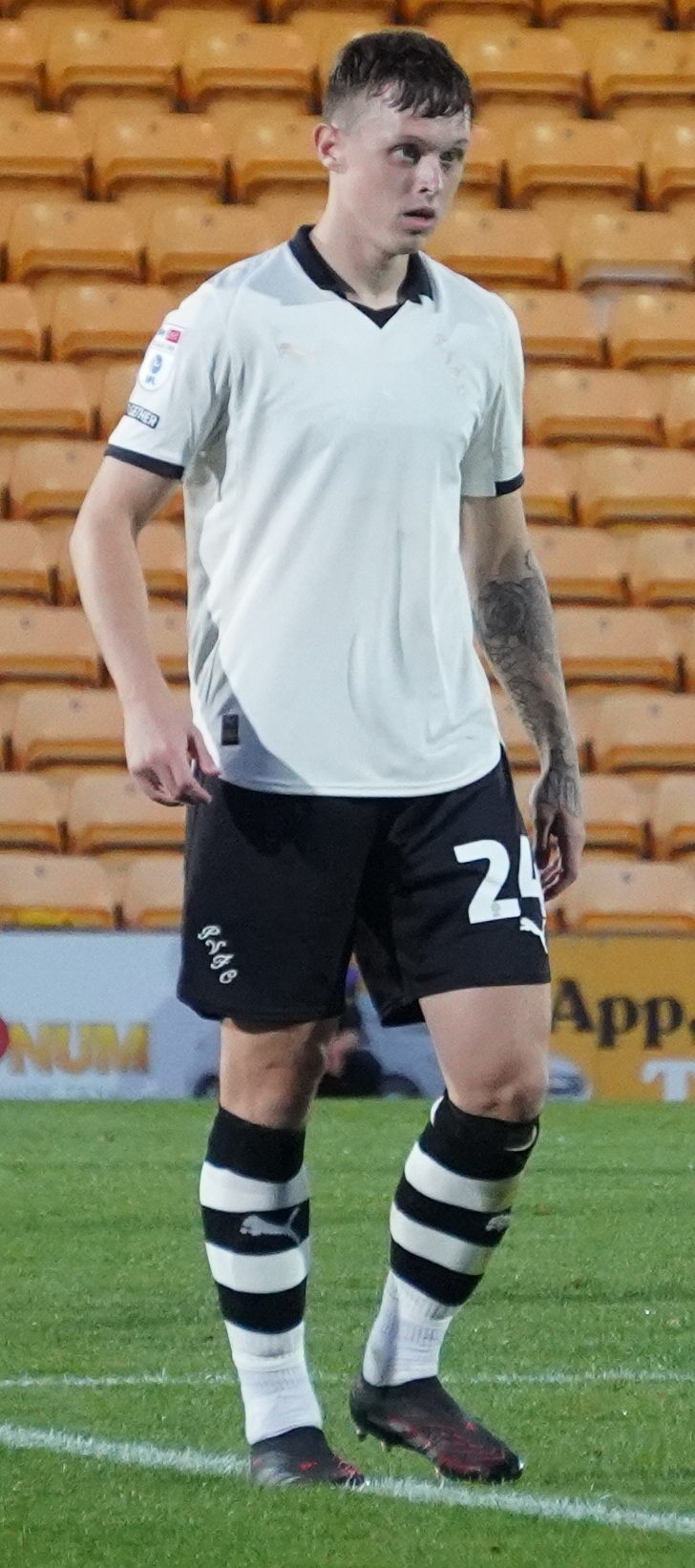
Player of the Year: Kyle John.

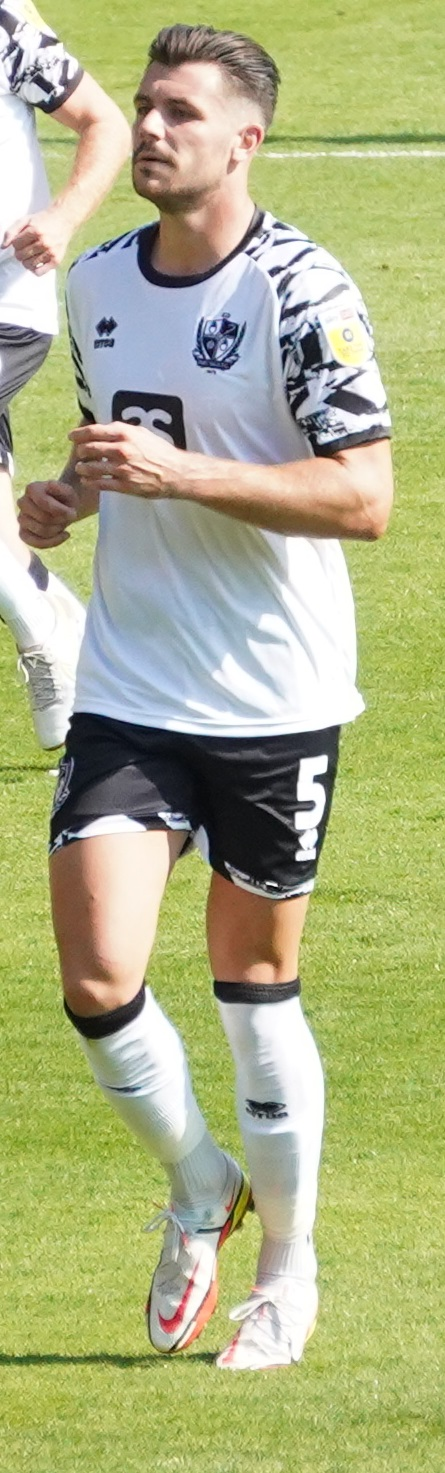
Connor Hall played more games than any other player.

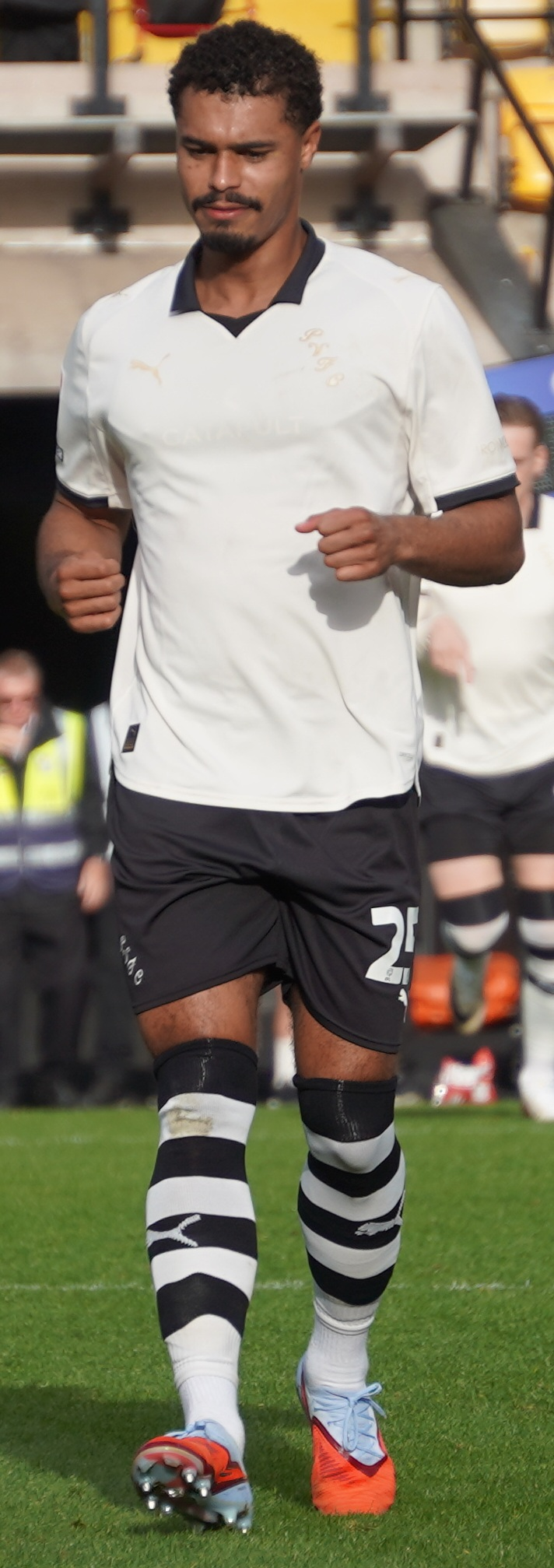
Cameron Humphreys was Connor Hall's defensive partner.

== Overview ==
=== EFL League One ===
CEO Matt Hancock said that he believed the club were in a stronger position than when they had last gained promotion ahead of the 2022–23 season. In celebration of the club's 150th anniversary, the home kit was based on the classic strip from the 1953–54 'Iron Curtain' season, in which the club reached the FA Cup semi-finals and conceded just 26 goals throughout a 46-game season. It was also confirmed that the kit would not display a front-of-shirt sponsor to maintain the retro look. The away kit was based on that worn by the 1958–59 title-winning team. The first signing of the summer was right-sided defender Jordan Gabriel, who joined on an initial two-year contract after being released by Blackpool. Attacking midfielder Rico Richards, who had played 27 league games on loan at Vale the previous season, was signed to a two-year deal after being released by Aston Villa. He would later join League Two side Walsall on loan for the season. Liam Gordon, a 26-year-old left-back capped at international level by Guyana, then chose to leave Walsall to sign for Vale on a two-year deal. Midfielder Jordan Shipley also signed a two-year contract after being released by relegated Shrewsbury Town. Bookmakers had the Vale pegged as relegation strugglers, though supporters were optimistic of a mid-table finish. The fifth summer signing was announced as 26-year-old central defender Cameron Humphreys, who rejected a contract offer from Rotherham United to join Vale on a two-year deal. The club ended June by announcing the signings of Slovak goalkeeper Marko Maroši and New Zealand international forward Ben Waine, who had been released by Cambridge United and Plymouth Argyle respectively, both signing for Vale on two-year deals.

The season opened with a 2–1 defeat at Rotherham United as the Vale were two goals and one man down on 32 minutes after Jaheim Headley was sent off for a knee-high challenge; Vale looked stronger after three half-time changes and a switch away from the 3–4–3 formation. On 7 August, Darren Moore signed 22-year-old Gambian striker Mo Faal on a season-long loan from Wrexham. Later that day, Vale picked up their first point of the season after playing out a 0–0 draw at home to Cardiff City. The following week, on 11 August, Vale signed 25-year-old Australian international goalkeeper Joe Gauci on a season-long loan from Aston Villa, with Moore hoping to provide "strong competition in the goalkeeping department" in the absence of veteran stopper Ben Amos through injury. Another clean sheet and point were gained at Burton Albion five days later, despite captain George Byers being sent off after 15 minutes for a strong challenge on Charlie Webster. The club appealed the red card, however, the original decision was upheld by an FA Regulatory Commission. Vale were heading to a one nil home victory over Stevenage until they conceded two Jamie Reid goals after 87 minutes to lose the game. They then lost top-scorer Lorent Tolaj to league rivals Plymouth Argyle after Argyle activated a "substantial release clause" in his Vale contract. This fee was reported to be £1.2 million. A 1–0 home defeat to Doncaster Rovers followed as the visitors took control of the game in the second half. Vale went on to bring 19-year-old forward Dajaune Brown on loan from Derby County. He came off the bench as Vale fell to a 1–0 defeat at Reading, the hosts taking all three points with a 66th-minute Paddy Lane strike.

Moore made two signings on transfer deadline day, bringing in experienced striker Devante Cole on a free transfer from West Bromwich Albion and midfielder George Hall from Birmingham City for an undisclosed fee. Cole provided an assist and scored on his debut at home to Leyton Orient on 6 September, though could not prevent his new side slipping to another defeat at Charlie Wellens scored the winning goal five minutes into stoppage-time for his father's team. Richie Wellens sympathised with Moore, saying he must have run over a black cat. The first league win was achieved with a 2–0 victory at Exeter City, as the new strike partnership of Cole and Paton secured a goal each after capitlising on mistakes by the home team. A second win followed at home to Mansfield Town, who had their captain Ryan Sweeney sent off after 14 minutes, though it took a stoppage-time Ronan Curtis penalty to secure the three points and Moore had some "choice words" for his players in the dressing room for conceding a sloppy goal. A 2–0 victory at Barnsley secured the Vale a third consecutive win in the league and a solid performance ensured that Gauci did not have a save to make throughout.

The winning run was halted by Northampton Town, who held the Valiants to a goalless draw at Vale Park on 4 October. Vale gained a point on the road seven days later as Cole struck an equaliser four minutes from full-time to prevent former Valiant Antwoine Hackford from winning three points for AFC Wimbledon. With the club facing an injury crisis in the wing-back position, Moore signed 34-year-old free agent Marvin Johnson to a short-term contract. They slipped to a 1–0 defeat at Wigan Athletic despite having a man advantage for the entire second half after Dara Costelloe was sent off for a high foot. A 3–0 home defeat to league leaders Stockport County in front of the television cameras left Vale in the relegation zone.

On 8 November, Vale fell to a 4–0 defeat at Bolton Wanderers despite having had a bright start to the match. The run of defeats came to an end with a goalless draw at home to Wycombe Wanderers. However, a 1–0 home defeat to Plymouth Argyle, the goal scored by Tolaj, saw Vale replace Plymouth at the bottom of the division and supporters called for Darren Moore to be sacked. Matt Hancock gave a lengthy interview backing Moore, saying that the board saw "signs that we can win football games". Jayden Stockley told the media that the players had organised a meeting with Moore and the coaching staff to discuss how to improve performances on the pitch. A 1–0 defeat at Lincoln City followed, a club record sixth consecutive league game without a goal scored.

On 13 December, Vale came from a goal down to lead 2–1 at Luton Town, only to end the game with a point following a Luton equaliser. Ben Amos made only his second league appearance of the season following back-to-back clean sheets in the cup competitions, whilst Ben Waine scored in his third straight game after also having a run of success in the cups. Waine's strike ended Vale's club record time of consecutive league time without a goal at 9 hours and 46 minutes. They then slipped to a 1–0 defeat at home to Peterborough United as Harry Leonard scored a late goal following a tight game. This equalled a club record of five home league games without scoring a goal. They travelled to Huddersfield Town on Boxing Day and were taken apart by five goals to nil, their heaviest defeat of the season. This proved to be the end for Darren Moore, with Jamie Smith being put in caretaker charge on 28 December. Smith took charge of a 1–0 defeat at Bradford City the following day.

Vale started 2026 with a 5–1 win at Blackpool after the hosts were reduced to 10 men just before half-time and proved unable to hold their one-goal lead. Ironically, the game also saw them extend into a club record 471 minutes without a home league goal and ended with them scoring five goals in one half of a league game for the first time since December 1960. Former Northampton Town manager Jon Brady was appointed as the club's new head coach on 6 January. Ronan Curtis left the club shortly afterwards on an undisclosed transfer to Plymouth Argyle. Vale initially looked strong at Mansfield Town on 17 January, though conceded two goals early in the second half and went on to lose the game by three goals to nil. The club brought in 23-year-old winger Ethon Archer on loan from Luton Town. The club celebrated their 150th anniversary with a 3–1 home defeat to Exeter City as yet again a promising start turned into a complete collapse once the opposition opened the scoring. Pundit Adam Yates commented that in the match "every single trait you would look for from a player was a zero out of 10". Brady brought in Tyler Magloire, a centre-back who played for him at Northampton Town, who had started the campaign with non-League side Workington. The club's top-scorer, Devante Cole, was sold to Luton Town on 31 January. Despite this, the team won at Leyton Orient, with the game's only goal coming from John in the second minute.

The club brought in defender Eli Campbell and forward Martin Sherif on loan from Everton. Former Premier League striker Andre Gray also came in on a free transfer following a spell with Turkish club Fatih Karagümrük. Vale then fell to a narrow 1–0 home defeat by AFC Wimbledon, in a game of few chances. They then drew 2–2 at home with Burton Albion, with Jake Beesley scoring a brace to equalise twice for the visitors. Following this, Brady signed two players from free agency: 33-year-old Cuba international winger Onel Hernández and 31-year-old midfielder Grant Ward. Stockley put the Vale ahead at Stevenage, though the hosts soon came back and won the match by two goals to one in a game married by a serious injury to goalscorer Harry Cornick. Gray had an equalising goal ruled out just before half-time in a decision that Brady said "for the life of me I don't understand it". Sherif then scored on his home debut to earn a 1–1 draw with Reading. Brady came away from former club Northampton Town with three points, with Stockley scoring the only goal of the game in first half stoppage-time as the home support booed their manager Kevin Nolan. Vale then picked up another point, drawing 1–1 at home with Luton Town.

On 11 March, Vale lost one of their rearranged games by two goals to nil at home to Bradford City, after which Brady admitted the scoreline could have been much worse. A series of illnesses saw a patched-up squad take on Huddersfield Town and hold the visitors to a goalless draw. Brady also labelled the Vale Park pitch a "joke" that was damaging his players following weeks of extremely poor surface as summer improvements to the pitch backfired and caused the surface to regress in poor weather. They twice lost the lead to fall to a 3–2 defeat at Blackpool. They took the lead against Bolton Wanderers and held on to a 1–0 win as the team played to the best of their abilities. However, they returned to losing ways with a 1–0 defeat at Doncaster Rovers. A heavy 4–0 loss at Wycombe Wanderers followed. Brady said the performance was "unacceptable" and explained that he had played Ben Garrity up front as with Waine on international duty no other striker at the club had the necessary work rate to start the game.

On 7 April, Vale recorded a 1–0 home win over Rotherham United to bring themselves within three points of the visitors, having successfully defended a one-goal lead gained through a sixth-minute Ryan Croasdale strike. The following week, Gauci saved a penalty to preserve a clean sheet in a goalless draw at home to Barnsley, which was enough to lift Vale off the bottom of the table for the first time since mid-November. Brady went on to criticise fans who booed the team at the full-time whistle, saying the players had made great efforts and that fans who wanted to boo should stay away. Just two days later, Vale won 3–1 at Peterborough United, with Archer scoring two goals form direct free kicks. A goalless draw at Wigan Athletic then left them needing to win all their four games to stand a chance at survival. A 1–0 defeat at Cardiff City on 22 April relegated Vale with three games left to play. Vale conceded within three minutes at Plymouth Argyle, though the home goalkeeper unnecessarily got himself sent off only two minutes later, and Plymouth went on to win 2–1 despite the man disadvantage. Vale went on to record a surprise 2–1 victory at play-off hopefuls Stockport County after heading into an early two-goal lead. Champions Lincoln City celebrated their title on the final day with a 2–0 victory at Vale Park. The club released 12 players and transfer-listed another four, with Ben Garrity being the only out-of-contract player to be offered a new deal.

=== Finances ===
The club's budget was speculated to be in the lower mid-table range. The club made over £1 million in prize money and TV revenue from their cup runs.

=== Cup competitions ===
Vale were drawn at home to the lowest-ranked team in the first round of the FA Cup, Maldon & Tiptree of the Isthmian League North Division. They fell behind after six minutes but quickly recovered and finished 5–1 winners, with both Paton and Cole claiming braces. They defeated League Two side Bristol Rovers by a goal to nil. This was the first time they had beaten a team managed by former Vale boss Darrell Clarke in nine attempts. Brady first match in charge at Vale Park was a 1–0 win over League Two club Fleetwood Town that took the Valiants into the fourth round. They had a home tie with Championship club Bristol City in the fourth round and took them to extra-time, where Waine scored the game's only goal to take Port Vale into the fifth round. Yet another home tie came just five days later in the fifth round, against Premier League Sunderland, and again Waine scored the game's only goal to take Vale into the quarter-finals for only the second time in the club's history. It was at the quarter-finals stage that FIFA Club World Cup champions Chelsea eased to a 7–0 victory at Stamford Bridge, with Jorrel Hato opening the scoring in the second minute.

Vale won 1–0 at League One rivals Blackpool in the first round of the EFL Cup, with Faal scoring on his debut, despite Moore making nine changes. They went on to defeat Championship club Birmingham City in the following round, with Headley scoring the only goal of the game. It was the club's first win away at Championship opposition in 15 years. Vale hosted Premier League giants Arsenal in the third round and put in a highly creditable performance in a 2–0 defeat, earning praise from both Moore and Arsenal manager Mikel Arteta.

In the EFL Trophy, they were drawn in a group with Accrington Stanley (League Two), Fleetwood Town (League Two), and Leeds United U21 (Academy). The Leeds youth team were dispatched by a 4–1 scoreline as a strong Vale team spread the goals amongst them. Late goals from Hall and Faal were enough to secure victory at Accrington Stanley. They stormed to a 5–0 home win over Barnsley in the first knockout stage of the competition, making a mockery of their run of six league games without scoring. Moore said the victory showed how "together" the squad was. It was the first time the club had made it to the third round of the EFL Cup, FA Cup and EFL Trophy in the same season. They travelled to league rivals Bolton Wanderers in the following round and reached the quarter-finals with a late Ben Waine goal. The cup run came to a halt with a four goal home defeat by Stockport County, with Brady furious at his team for a second-half collapse.

The three teams that knocked the Vale out of each competition went on to finish as the tournament's runners-up – Chelsea losing the 2026 FA Cup final, Arsenal beaten in the 2026 EFL Cup final, and Stockport County losing the 2026 EFL Trophy final.

== Results ==
=== Pre-season ===
Win Draw Loss Fixtures

27 June 2025 Friendly	Newcastle Town	0–0	Port Vale	Newcastle-under-Lyme
19:30 BST		Report		Stadium: Lyme Valley Stadium; Attendance: 1,672

28 June 2025 Friendly	Kidsgrove Athletic	0–7	Port Vale	Kidsgrove
15:00 BST		Report	Noordanus 24'; Tolaj 66' (pen.), 73', 77'; Shorrock 75'; Paton 81'; Gabriel 91'	Stadium: Hollinwood Road; Attendance: 1,900+

4 July 2025 Friendly	West Bromwich Albion	2–0	Port Vale	Walsall
14:00 BST	Bany; Bostock	Report		Stadium: WBA Training Ground; Attendance: 0 (behind closed doors)

12 July 2025 Friendly	Bath City	1–5	Port Vale	Twerton
15:00 BST	Wilson 32'	Report	Clark 12'; Hart 20'; Stockley 41'; Richards 50'; Waine 70'	Stadium: Twerton Park; Attendance: 541

15 July 2025 Friendly	PFA XI	2–3	Port Vale	Ashby-de-la-Zouch
12:55 BST	Olomola 61'; Hiwula 63'	Report	Waine 20'; Shorrock 32'; Richards 87'	Stadium: Champneys Springs; Attendance: 0 (behind closed doors)

19 July 2025 Friendly	Port Vale	1–3	Notts County	Burslem
14:00 BST	Byers 25'	Report	Jones 7'; Jatta 82' (pen.), 86'	Stadium: Vale Park; Attendance: 0 (behind closed doors)

22 July 2025 Friendly	Everton	2–1	Port Vale	Vauxhall
13:00 BST	Alcaraz; Garner	Report	Paton 2'	Stadium: Hill Dickinson Stadium; Attendance: 0 (behind closed doors)

26 July 2025 Friendly	Port Vale	0–2	Birmingham City	Burslem
13:00 BST		Report	Anderson 26'; Willumsson 80'	Stadium: Vale Park; Attendance: 3,531

29 July 2025 Friendly	Altrincham	1–1	Port Vale	Altrincham
19:45 BST	Ward 44'	Report	Heneghan 70'	Stadium: Moss Lane; Attendance: 1,333

=== EFL League One ===
==== League table ====
Pos	Team	Pld	W	D	L	GF	GA	GD	Pts	Promotion, qualification or relegation
20	Leyton Orient	46	14	10	22	59	71	−12	52	
21	Exeter City (R)	46	12	13	21	52	61	−9	49	Relegation to EFL League Two
22	Port Vale (R)	46	10	12	24	36	61	−25	42	Relegation to EFL League Two
23	Rotherham United (R)	46	10	11	25	41	71	−30	41	Relegation to EFL League Two
24	Northampton Town (R)	46	9	8	29	39	74	−35	35	Relegation to EFL League Two

Source: EFL Official Website
Rules for classification: 1) Points; 2) Goal difference; 3) Number of goals scored; 4) Head-to-head results; 5) Wins; 6) Away goals; 7) Penalty points (sec 9.5); 8) 12-point sending off offences
(R) Relegated

==== Results by matchday ====
Round	1	2	3	4	5	6	7	8	9	10	11	12	13	14	15	16	17	18	20	21	22	23	24	27	28	30	29^{4}	31	33	34	26^{3}	35	19^{1}	37	38	39	32^{5}	40	42	25^{2}	36^{6}	44	41^{7}	45	43^{8}	46
Ground	A	H	A	H	H	A	H	A	H	A	H	A	A	H	A	H	H	A	A	H	A	A	H	A	H	A	H	H	A	H	A	H	H	H	A	H	A	A	H	H	A	H	A	A	A	H
Result	L	D	D	L	L	L	L	W	W	W	D	D	L	L	L	D	L	L	D	L	L	L	W	L	L	W	L	D	L	D	W	D	L	D	L	W	L	L	W	D	W	D	L	L	W	L
Position	17	13	18	19	22	23	23	20	19	16	16	15	18	21	23	22	24	24	24	24	24	24	24	24	24	24	24	24	24	24	24	24	24	24	24	24	24	24	24	23	22	23	23	23	23	22
Points	0	1	2	2	2	2	2	5	8	11	12	13	13	13	13	14	14	14	15	15	15	15	18	18	18	21	21	22	22	23	26	27	27	28	28	31	31	31	34	35	38	39	39	39	42	42

Source: EFL
A = Away; H = Home; W = Win; D = Draw; L = Loss; P = Postponed
Notes:
- ^{1} Matchday 19 (vs Bradford City) was postponed due to waterlogged pitch.
- ^{2} Matchday 25 (vs Barnsley) was postponed due to a frozen pitch.
- ^{3} Matchday 26 (vs Northampton Town) was postponed due to FA Cup involvements.
- ^{4} Matchday 29 (vs AFC Wimbledon) was postponed due to waterlogged pitch.
- ^{5} Matchday 32 (vs Doncaster Rovers) was postponed due to FA Cup involvements.
- ^{6} Matchday 36 (vs Peterborough United) was postponed due to FA Cup involvements.
- ^{7} Matchday 41 (vs Cardiff City) was postponed due to FA Cup involvements.
- ^{8} Matchday 43 (vs Stockport County) was postponed due to EFL Trophy involvements.

==== Matches ====
Win Draw Loss Fixtures

2 August 2025 1	Rotherham United	2–1	Port Vale	Rotherham
15:00 BST	Nombe 13', 29'	Report	C.Hall 60'	Stadium: New York Stadium; Attendance: 9,883; Referee: Jacob Miles; Assistant referees: Bradley Hall, Wayne Grunnill; Fourth official: Paul Cooper

7 August 2025 2	Port Vale	0–0	Cardiff City	Burslem
20:00 BST		Report		Stadium: Vale Park; Attendance: 9,791; Referee: Tom Reeves; Assistant referees: Samuel Clayton, Christopher Husband; Fourth official: Scott Jackson
Note: Fixture was originally scheduled for 9 August but was moved for live Sky Sports broadcast.

16 August 2025 3	Burton Albion	0–0	Port Vale	Burton upon Trent
12:30 BST		Report		Stadium: Pirelli Stadium; Attendance: 4,404; Referee: Scott Oldham; Assistant referees: Harley Hetherington, Grant Taylor; Fourth official: Elliott Swallow
Note: Fixture was originally scheduled for a 15:00 kick-off but was moved for live Sky Sports broadcast.

19 August 2025 4	Port Vale	1–2	Stevenage	Burslem
19:45 BST	Tolaj 36'	Report	Reid 88', 90+1'	Stadium: Vale Park; Attendance: 6,653; Referee: Seb Stockbridge; Assistant referees: Simon Robinson, Andrew Ellis; Fourth official: Edward Duckworth

23 August 2025 5	Port Vale	0–1	Doncaster Rovers	Burslem
15:00 BST		Report	Bailey 54'	Stadium: Vale Park; Attendance: 7,728; Referee: Ruebyn Ricardo; Assistant referees: Mark Stevens, Johnathon Bickerdike; Fourth official: Matthew Scholes

30 August 2025 6	Reading	1–0	Port Vale	Reading, Berkshire
15:00 BST	Lane 66'	Report		Stadium: Madejski Stadium; Attendance: 12,624; Referee: Thomas Parsons; Assistant referees: Kevin Howick, Rob Smith; Fourth official: Paul Johnson

6 September 2025 7	Port Vale	2–3	Leyton Orient	Burslem
15:00 BST	Croasdale 7'; Cole 52'	Report	Connolly 13'; Ballard 44'; Wellens 90+5'	Stadium: Vale Park; Attendance: 7,721; Referee: Ross Joyce; Assistant referees: Marvyn Amphlett, Steve Durnall; Fourth official: Ross Martin

13 September 2025 8	Exeter City	0–2	Port Vale	Exeter
15:00 BST		Report	Paton 4'; Cole 45'	Stadium: St James Park; Attendance: 6,221; Referee: Matthew Russell; Assistant referees: Jack Clench, Adam Ricketts; Fourth official: Alan Dale

20 September 2025 9	Port Vale	2–1	Mansfield Town	Burslem
15:00 BST	Cole 53'; Curtis 90+5'	Report	Oates 86'	Stadium: Vale Park; Attendance: 9,013; Referee: Alex Chilowicz; Assistant referees: Jonathan Hunt, Matthew Archibald; Fourth official: Wayne Cartmel

27 September 2025 10	Barnsley	0–2	Port Vale	Barnsley
15:00 BST		Report	Gabriel 65'; Croasdale 89'	Stadium: Oakwell; Attendance: 10,688; Referee: James Linington; Assistant referees: Hugh Gilroy, Wayne Grunnill; Fourth official: William Davis

4 October 2025 11	Port Vale	0–0	Northampton Town	Burslem
15:00 BST		Report		Stadium: Vale Park; Attendance: 7,657; Referee: Martin Woods; Assistant referees: Jake Topp, Daniel Smith; Fourth official: Richie Watkins

11 October 2025 12	AFC Wimbledon	1–1	Port Vale	Wimbledon, London
15:00 BST	Hackford 72'	Report	Cole 86'	Stadium: Plough Lane; Attendance: 8,686; Referee: Carl Brook; Assistant referees: Gregory Read, Justin Amey; Fourth official: Elliott Swallow

18 October 2025 13	Wigan Athletic	1–0	Port Vale	Wigan
15:00 BST	Asamoah 56'	Report		Stadium: Brick Community Stadium; Referee: Ross Martin; Assistant referees: Ashley Allen, Bradley Hall; Fourth official: Melissa Burgin

27 October 2025 14	Port Vale	0–3	Stockport County	Burslem
20:00 GMT		Report	Lowe 13'; Wootton 23'; Diamond 29'	Stadium: Vale Park; Attendance: 8,452; Referee: Edward Duckworth; Assistant referees: Drew Dutton, Harley McKittrick; Fourth official: Richard Aspinall
Note: Fixture was originally scheduled for 25 October but was moved for live Sky Sports broadcast.

8 November 2025 15	Bolton Wanderers	4–0	Port Vale	Horwich
15:00 GMT	Cozier-Duberry 31', 68'; Simons 36'; Dempsey 72'	Report		Stadium: Toughsheet Community Stadium; Attendance: 21,658; Referee: Martin Coy; Assistant referees: Daniel Woodward, Thomas Harty; Fourth official: Ben Speedie

15 November 2025 16	Port Vale	0–0	Wycombe Wanderers	Burslem
15:00 GMT		Report		Stadium: Vale Park; Attendance: 6,783; Referee: Jacob Miles; Assistant referees: Grant Taylor, Lewis Raper; Fourth official: Richie Watkins

22 November 2025 17	Port Vale	0–1	Plymouth Argyle	Burslem
12:30 GMT		Report	Tolaj 46'	Stadium: Vale Park; Attendance: 7,358; Referee: Abigail Byrne; Assistant referees: Ashley Allen, Matthew Moss; Fourth official: Niall Smith
Note: Fixture was originally scheduled for a 15:00 kick-off but was moved for live Sky Sports broadcast.

29 November 2025 18	Lincoln City	1–0	Port Vale	Lincoln
15:00 GMT	Hackett 33'	Report		Stadium: Sincil Bank; Attendance: 8,503; Referee: Peter Wright; Assistant referees: Daniel Guest, Paul Newhouse; Fourth official: Callum Walchester

13 December 2025 20	Luton Town	2–2	Port Vale	Luton
15:00 GMT	Bramall 26'; Andersen 70'	Report	Waine 42'; Cole 54'	Stadium: Kenilworth Road; Attendance: 10,867; Referee: Lee Swabey; Assistant referees: Michael Chard, Oliver Bickle; Fourth official: Abigail Byrne

20 December 2025 21	Port Vale	0–1	Peterborough United	Burslem
15:00 GMT		Report	Leonard 83'	Stadium: Vale Park; Attendance: 7,533; Referee: Kirsty Dowle; Assistant referees: Mark Ryder, Aaron Hallam; Fourth official: Declan Brown

26 December 2025 22	Huddersfield Town	5–0	Port Vale	Huddersfield
15:00 GMT	Castledine 5', 58'; Ledson 15'; Radulović 32'; May 50'	Report		Stadium: Kirklees Stadium; Attendance: 18,626; Referee: Martin Woods; Assistant referees: Graeme Fyvie, Matthew Archibald; Fourth official: Melissa Burgin

29 December 2025 23	Bradford City	1–0	Port Vale	Bradford
19:45 GMT	Metcalfe 67'	Report		Stadium: Valley Parade; Referee: Scott Oldham; Assistant referees: Thomas Cooke, Tyler Dutton; Fourth official: Dale Baines

1 January 2026 24	Port Vale	5–1	Blackpool	Burslem
15:00 GMT	Stockley 54'; Byers 58'; Headley 73'; Cole 86'; Curtis 90+4'	Report	Bloxham 27'	Stadium: Vale Park; Attendance: 7,541; Referee: Edward Duckworth; Assistant referees: Niall Felton, Ashley Allen; Fourth official: Oliver Mackey

17 January 2026 27	Mansfield Town	3–0	Port Vale	Mansfield
15:00 GMT	Irow 55', 68'; Evans 59'	Report		Stadium: Field Mill; Attendance: 8,364; Referee: Abigail Byrne; Assistant referees: Daniel Robinson, Drew Dutton; Fourth official: Wayne Cartmel

24 January 2026 28	Port Vale	1–3	Exeter City	Burslem
15:00 GMT	Humphreys 75'	Report	Mendes Gomes 22'; Wareham 47'; Tutierov 59'	Stadium: Vale Park; Attendance: 8,432; Referee: Andrew Humphries; Assistant referees: Grant Taylor, Scott Chalkley; Fourth official: Richard Aspinall

31 January 2026 30	Leyton Orient	0–1	Port Vale	Leyton, London
15:00 GMT		Report	John 2'	Stadium: Brisbane Road; Attendance: 7,692; Referee: David Rock; Assistant referees: Jon Block, Conor Farrell; Fourth official: Jason Richardson

3 February 2026 29	Port Vale	0–1	AFC Wimbledon	Burslem
19:00 GMT		Report	Maycock 88'	Stadium: Vale Park; Attendance: 4,534; Referee: James Oldham; Assistant referees: Oliver Bickle, Matthew Moss; Fourth official: Steven Copeland
Note: Fixture was originally scheduled for 27 January, but it was postponed due to a waterlogged pitch.

7 February 2026 31	Port Vale	2–2	Burton Albion	Burslem
12:31 GMT	Archer 6'; Waine 29'	Report	Beesley 26', 52'	Stadium: Vale Park; Attendance: 6,232; Referee: Will Finnie; Assistant referees: Samuel Clayton, Aaron Hallam; Fourth official: Scott Jackson
Note: Fixture was initially scheduled for a 15:01 kick-off, but was rescheduled for live Sky Sports broadcasting.

17 February 2026 33	Stevenage	2–1	Port Vale	Stevenage
19:45 GMT	Phillips 19'; Cornick 24'	Report	Stockley 10'	Stadium: Broadhall Way; Attendance: 2,715; Referee: James Durkin; Assistant referees: Declan O'Shea, Alan Cresswell; Fourth official: Alan Dale

21 February 2026 34	Port Vale	1–1	Reading	Burslem
15:00 GMT	Sherif 90+6'	Report	Wing 39' (pen.)	Stadium: Vale Park; Attendance: 7,023; Referee: Carl Brook; Assistant referees: Karl Buckley, Daniel Guest; Fourth official: Marvyn Amphlett

24 February 2026 26	Northampton Town	0–1	Port Vale	Northampton
19:45 GMT		Report	Stockley 45+8'	Stadium: Sixfields Stadium; Attendance: 5,335; Referee: Charles Breakspear; Assistant referees: Daniel Flynn, David Middleton; Fourth official: Robert Massey-Ellis
Note: Fixture was originally scheduled for 10 January 2026 but was moved so as not to clash with Port Vale's FA Cup Third Round fixture.

28 February 2026 35	Port Vale	1–1	Luton Town	Burslem
15:00 GMT	Waine 29'	Report	Wells 5'	Stadium: Vale Park; Attendance: 7,335; Referee: Lee Swabey; Assistant referees: Thomas Staten, Harley Hetherington; Fourth official: Matthew Archibald

11 March 2026 19	Port Vale	0–2	Bradford City	Burslem
19:45 GMT		Report	Pointon 31'; Wright 66'	Stadium: Vale Park; Attendance: 6,098; Referee: Paul Howard; Assistant referees: Matthew Jones, Matthew Joyce; Fourth official: Kieran Forrest
Note: Fixture was originally scheduled for 9 December but was postponed due to a waterlogged pitch.

14 March 2026 37	Port Vale	0–0	Huddersfield Town	Burslem
15:00 GMT		Report		Stadium: Vale Park; Attendance: 6,878; Referee: Thomas Parsons; Assistant referees: Ollie Williams, Daniel Robinson; Fourth official: Jason Roberts

17 March 2026 38	Blackpool	3–2	Port Vale	Blackpool
19:45 GMT	Ennis 46'; Fletcher 72'; Walters 81'	Report	Brown 2'; Walters 59'	Stadium: Bloomfield Road; Attendance: 8,567; Referee: Will Finnie; Assistant referees: Kevin Mulraine, Mark Ryder; Fourth official: Oliver Nolan

21 March 2026 39	Port Vale	1–0	Bolton Wanderers	Burslem
15:00 GMT	Hall 34'	Report		Stadium: Vale Park; Attendance: 8,442; Referee: Tom Reeves; Assistant referees: Drew Dutton, Steve Durnall; Fourth official: Andrew Miller

24 March 2026 32	Doncaster Rovers	1–0	Port Vale	Doncaster
19:45 GMT	Campbell 22' (og.)	Report		Stadium: Eco-Power Stadium; Attendance: 7,178; Referee: Michael Barlow; Assistant referees: Aaron Hallam, Daniel Smith; Fourth official: Thomas Cooke
Note: Fixture was originally scheduled for 24 March but was postponed due to Port Vale's progress in the FA Cup.

28 March 2026 40	Wycombe Wanderers	4–0	Port Vale	High Wycombe
15:00 GMT	Woodrow 24'; Taylor 69'; Onyedinma 85'; Quitirna 90+3'	Report		Stadium: Adams Park; Attendance: 5,073; Referee: Darren Drysdale; Assistant referees: Harley Hetherington, Marc Wilson; Fourth official: Alan Dale

7 April 2026 42	Port Vale	1–0	Rotherham United	Burslem
19:45 BST	Croasdale 6'	Report		Stadium: Vale Park; Attendance: 4,523; Referee: Ross Joyce; Assistant referees: Ryan Aldred, Zharir Mustafa; Fourth official: Scott Jackson
Note: Fixture was initially scheduled for 6 April, but was pushed back a day due to FA Cup involvement the preceding weekend.

14 April 2026 25	Port Vale	0–0	Barnsley	Burslem
19:45 BST		Report		Stadium: Vale Park; Attendance: 4,863; Referee: Oliver Mackey; Assistant referees: Grant Taylor, Matthew Moss; Fourth official: Matthew Joyce
Note: Fixture was originally scheduled for 4 January but was postponed due to a frozen pitch.

16 April 2026 36	Peterborough United	1–3	Port Vale	Peterborough
19:45 GMT	Dornelly 31'	Report	Croasdale 3'; Archer 16', 59'	Stadium: London Road Stadium; Attendance: 6,533; Referee: Harry Wager; Assistant referees: Ross Murphy, Kevin Howick; Fourth official: Stephen Parkinson
Note: Fixture was originally scheduled for 7 March but was postponed due to Port Vale's progress in the FA Cup.

19 April 2026 44	Port Vale	0–0	Wigan Athletic	Burslem
15:00 BST		Report		Stadium: Vale Park; Attendance: 7,348; Referee: Elliot Bell; Assistant referees: Sam Wesson, Jason Roberts; Fourth official: Karl Buckley
Note: Fixture was initially scheduled for 18 April, but was moved back a day due to also having a fixture on the preceding Thursday.

22 April 2026 41	Cardiff City	1–0	Port Vale	Cardiff
15:00 BST	Colwill 79'	Report		Stadium: Cardiff City Stadium; Attendance: 18,950; Referee: David Rock; Assistant referees: Harley McKittrick, Kevin Morris; Fourth official: Jacob Miles
Note: Fixture was initially scheduled for 3 April, but was postponed due to Port Vale's progress in the FA Cup.

25 April 2026 45	Plymouth Argyle	2–1	Port Vale	Plymouth
15:00 BST	Pepple 3', 47'	Report	Hall 14'	Stadium: Home Park; Attendance: 16,129; Referee: Isaac Searle; Assistant referees: Justin Amey, Gregory Read; Fourth official: Thomas Staten

28 April 2026 43	Stockport County	1–2	Port Vale	Stockport
19:45 BST	Bailey 86'	Report	Sherif 4'; Lawrence-Gabriel 23'	Stadium: Edgeley Park; Attendance: 8,884; Referee: Alex Chilowicz; Assistant referees: Daniel Smith, Martin Parker; Fourth official: Jordan Brooks
Note: Fixture was originally scheduled for 11 April but was postponed due to Stockport County's progress in the EFL Trophy.

2 May 2026 46	Port Vale	0–2	Lincoln City	Burslem
15:00 BST		Report	House 9'; Street 49'	Stadium: Vale Park; Attendance: 8,980; Referee: Andrew Humphries; Assistant referees: Drew Dutton, Aaron Hallam; Fourth official: Thomas Harty

=== FA Cup ===
Win Draw Loss Fixtures

2 November 2025 R1	Port Vale	5–1	Maldon & Tiptree	Burslem
15:00 GMT	Paton 15', 18'; Hall 16'; Cole 24', 56'	Report	Lewis 6'	Stadium: Vale Park; Attendance: 4,551; Referee: Richard Eley; Assistant referees: Mark Cunliffe, Christopher Husband; Fourth official: Matthew McQuillan

6 December 2025 R2	Port Vale	1–0	Bristol Rovers	Burslem
15:00 GMT	Waine 47'	Report		Stadium: Vale Park; Attendance: 3,227; Referee: Ross Joyce; Assistant referees: William Cavanagh, Drew Dutton; Fourth official: Oliver Noonan

9 January 2026 R3	Port Vale	1–0	Fleetwood Town	Burslem
19:30 GMT	Shipley 45+2'	Report		Stadium: Vale Park; Attendance: 3,366; Referee: Ben Speedie; Assistant referees: Jacob Lehane, David Middleton; Fourth official: Michael Barlow

3 March 2026 R4	Port Vale	1–0 (a.e.t.)	Bristol City	Burslem
19:45 GMT	Waine 112'	Report		Stadium: Vale Park; Attendance: 4,611; Referee: Elliot Bell; Assistant referees: Matthew Sowerby, Graeme Fyvie; Fourth official: Dale Baines
Note: Fixture was originally scheduled for 14 February, but it was postponed due to a waterlogged pitch.

8 March 2026 R5	Port Vale	1–0	Sunderland	Burslem
13:30 GMT	Waine 28'	Report		Stadium: Vale Park; Attendance: 10,685; Referee: Anthony Taylor; Assistant referees: Gary Beswick, Adam Nunn; Fourth official: Ben Toner

4 April 2026 QF	Chelsea	7–0	Port Vale	Fulham
17:15 BST	Hato 2'; João Pedro 25'; Lawrence-Gabriel 42' (o.g.); Adarabioyo 57'; Santos 69'; Estêvão 82'; Garnacho 90+2' (pen.)	Report		Stadium: Stamford Bridge; Attendance: 38,375; Referee: Farai Hallam; Assistant referees: Richard West, Steven Meredith; Fourth official: Andrew Madley

=== EFL Cup ===
Win Draw Loss Fixtures

12 August 2025 R1	Blackpool	0–1	Port Vale	Blackpool
19:45 BST		Report	Faal 75'	Stadium: Bloomfield Road; Attendance: 2,606; Referee: Simon Mather; Assistant referees: Ryan Aldred, Alex Gray; Fourth official: Kevin Mulraine

26 August 2025 R2	Birmingham City	0–1	Port Vale	Birmingham
19:45 BST		Report	Headley 45'	Stadium: St Andrew's; Attendance: 21,052; Referee: Ben Speedie; Assistant referees: Daniel Jarvis, Jacob Lehane; Fourth official: Peter Wright

24 September 2025 R3	Port Vale	0–2	Arsenal	Burslem
20:00 BST		Report	Eze 8'; Trossard 86'	Stadium: Vale Park; Attendance: 16,326; Referee: Andrew Kitchen; Assistant referees: Shaun Hudson, Sam Lewis; Fourth official: Andrew Humphries

=== EFL Trophy ===
Pos	Div	Team	Pld	W	PW	PL	L	GF	GA	GD	Pts	Qualification
1	L1	Port Vale	3	2	0	1	0	9	4	+5	7	Advance to Round 2
2	L2	Fleetwood Town	3	1	2	0	0	9	5	+4	7	Advance to Round 2
3	L2	Accrington Stanley	3	1	0	1	1	5	6	−1	4	
4	ACA	Leeds United U21	3	0	0	0	3	3	11	−8	0	

Source: EFL

Win Draw Loss Fixtures

2 September 2025 Group stage	Port Vale	4–1	Leeds United U21	Burslem
19:45 BST	Paton 23'; Shorrock 34'; Curtis 63'; Faal 86'	Report	McDonald 12'	Stadium: Vale Park; Attendance: 1,049; Referee: Elliott Swallow; Assistant referees: Thomas Cooke, Daniel Guest; Fourth official: Kenwyn Hughes

7 October 2025 Group stage	Accrington Stanley	0–2	Port Vale	Accrington
19:45 BST		Report	C.Hall 82'; Faal 85'	Stadium: Crown Ground; Attendance: 649; Referee: Robert Massey-Ellis; Assistant referees: Joe Simpson, Kevin Mulraine; Fourth official: William Vaughan

11 November 2025 Group stage	Port Vale	3–3 (4–2 p)	Fleetwood Town	Burslem
19:45 GMT	Shipley 53'; Brown 56'; Hall 88'	Report	Helm 32'; Medley 70', 83'	Stadium: Vale Park; Attendance: 723; Referee: Jamie O'Connor; Assistant referees: Oliver Bickle, Niall Felton; Fourth official: Jack Nield
	Penalties
	Stockley (penalty missed); Curtis (penalty scored); Paton (penalty scored); Byers (penalty missed)		Helm (penalty scored); Davies (penalty scored); Graydon (penalty scored); Ennis (penalty scored)

2 December 2025 Round of 32	Port Vale	5–0	Barnsley	Burslem
19:00 GMT	Paton 5', 8'; Brown 72'; Waine 80'; Debrah 83'	Report		Stadium: Vale Park; Attendance: 636; Referee: Elliot Bell; Assistant referees: James Tewson, Samuel Fudge; Fourth official: Joe Simpson

13 January 2026 Round of 16	Bolton Wanderers	0–1	Port Vale	Horwich
19:00 GMT		Report	Waine 90'	Stadium: Toughsheet Community Stadium; Attendance: 1,955; Referee: Jamie O'Connor; Assistant referees: Matthew Parry, Daniel Guest; Fourth official: Kenwyn Hughes

10 February 2026 Quarter-finals	Port Vale	0–4	Stockport County	Burslem
19:00 GMT		Report	Sidibeh 36', 59'; Amos 83' (og.); Diamond 90+1'	Stadium: Vale Park; Attendance: 1,577; Referee: Peter Wright; Assistant referees: Steve Durnall, Harley McKittrick; Fourth official: Richard Eley

== Squad statistics ==
=== Appearances and goals ===
Key to positions: GK – Goalkeeper; DF – Defender; MF – Midfielder; FW – Forward

No.	Pos	Nat	Player	Total		EFL League One		FA Cup		EFL Cup		EFL Trophy	
No.	Pos	Nat	Player	Apps	Goals	Apps	Goals	Apps	Goals	Apps	Goals	Apps	Goals
1	GK	(Slovakia) SVK	Marko Maroši	7	0	5	0	0	0	1	0	1	0
2	DF	(Wales) WAL	Mitch Clark	16	0	12	0	1	0	2	0	1	0
3	DF	(England) ENG	Jaheim Headley	38	2	27	1	4	0	2	1	5	0
4	DF	(England) ENG	Ben Heneghan	35	0	24	0	3	0	2	0	6	0
5	DF	(England) ENG	Connor Hall	49	3	39	2	5	0	1	0	4	1
6	DF	(England) ENG	Jordan Gabriel	34	2	26	2	3	0	3	0	2	0
7	MF	(Scotland) SCO	George Byers	25	1	20	1	3	0	0	0	2	0
8	MF	(England) ENG	Ben Garrity	28	0	25	0	1	0	2	0	0	0
9	FW	(England) ENG	Jayden Stockley	28	3	22	3	1	0	2	0	3	0
10	FW	(Jamaica) JAM	Dajaune Brown	34	3	24	1	4	0	0	0	6	2
11	FW	(England) ENG	Ethon Archer	23	3	20	3	3	0	0	0	0	0
12	MF	(England) ENG	Rhys Walters	37	1	26	1	4	0	3	0	4	0
13	GK	(England) ENG	Ben Amos	13	0	7	0	1	0	0	0	5	0
14	MF	(Belgium) BEL	Funso Ojo	36	0	27	0	4	0	1	0	4	0
15	DF	(Guyana) GUY	Liam Gordon	34	0	26	0	3	0	2	0	3	0
17	FW	(Republic of Ireland) IRL	Ruari Paton	22	6	13	1	2	2	2	0	5	3
18	MF	(England) ENG	Ryan Croasdale	39	4	31	4	1	0	3	0	4	0
19	FW	(New Zealand) NZL	Ben Waine	37	8	27	3	5	3	1	0	4	2
20	MF	(England) ENG	Rico Richards	2	0	1	0	0	0	1	0	0	0
21	FW	(Netherlands) NED	Martin Sherif	19	2	17	2	2	0	0	0	0	0
22	DF	(England) ENG	Jesse Debrah	25	1	17	0	1	0	3	0	4	1
23	DF	(England) ENG	Jack Shorrock	3	1	0	0	0	0	1	0	2	1
24	DF	(England) ENG	Kyle John	36	1	25	1	4	0	2	0	5	0
25	DF	(England) ENG	Cameron Humphreys	48	1	37	1	5	0	3	0	3	0
26	MF	(Republic of Ireland) IRL	Jordan Shipley	33	2	27	0	2	1	1	0	3	1
27	DF	(England) ENG	Eli Campbell	20	0	16	0	3	0	0	0	1	0
28	MF	(England) ENG	Grant Ward	8	0	5	0	2	0	0	0	1	0
29	GK	(England) ENG	Arron Davies	0	0	0	0	0	0	0	0	0	0
30	DF	(England) ENG	Ben Lomax	1	0	0	0	0	0	0	0	1	0
31	FW	(England) ENG	Eddie Lake	1	0	1	0	0	0	0	0	0	0
33	DF	(England) ENG	George Hall	47	3	37	1	5	1	1	0	4	1
34	GK	(England) ENG	Dougie Blight	0	0	0	0	0	0	0	0	0	0
35	DF	(England) ENG	Tyler Magloire	13	0	9	0	3	0	0	0	1	0
36	MF	(England) ENG	Charlie Bussell	0	0	0	0	0	0	0	0	0	0
42	DF	(England) ENG	Sam Hart	0	0	0	0	0	0	0	0	0	0
45	FW	(Jamaica) JAM	Andre Gray	15	0	11	0	3	0	0	0	1	0
46	GK	(Australia) AUS	Joe Gauci	41	0	34	0	5	0	2	0	0	0
50	FW	(Cuba) CUB	Onel Hernández	11	0	9	0	1	0	0	0	1	0
Players who featured but departed the club during the season:
10	FW	(Switzerland) SUI	Lorent Tolaj	4	1	4	1	0	0	0	0	0	0
11	FW	(Republic of Ireland) IRL	Ronan Curtis	27	3	19	2	2	0	2	0	4	1
21	FW	(England) ENG	James Plant	1	0	0	0	0	0	1	0	0	0
28	DF	(England) ENG	Marvin Johnson	7	0	5	0	2	0	0	0	0	0
36	FW	(The Gambia) GAM	Mo Faal	23	3	13	0	3	0	2	1	5	2
44	FW	(England) ENG	Devante Cole	23	8	19	6	3	2	1	0	0	0

=== Top scorers ===
Place	Position	Nation	Number	Name	EFL League One	FA Cup	EFL Cup	EFL Trophy	Total
1	FW	England	44	Devante Cole	6	2	0	0	8
–	FW	New Zealand	19	Ben Waine	3	3	0	2	8
3	FW	Ireland	17	Ruari Paton	1	2	0	3	6
4	MF	England	18	Ryan Croasdale	4	0	0	0	4
5	FW	England	11	Ethon Archer	3	0	0	0	3
–	FW	Ireland	11	Ronan Curtis	2	0	0	1	3
–	FW	Gambia	36	Mo Faal	0	0	1	2	3
–	FW	England	9	Jayden Stockley	3	0	0	0	3
–	FW	Jamaica	10	Dajaune Brown	1	0	0	2	3
–	DF	England	5	Connor Hall	2	0	0	1	3
–	DF	England	33	George Hall	1	1	0	1	3
12	DF	England	3	Jaheim Headley	1	0	1	0	2
–	DF	England	6	Jordan Gabriel	2	0	0	0	2
—	FW	Netherlands	21	Martin Sherif	2	0	0	0	2
–	MF	England	26	Jordan Shipley	0	1	0	1	2
16	MF	Scotland	7	George Byers	1	0	0	0	1
–	DF	England	22	Jesse Debrah	0	0	0	1	1
–	DF	England	25	Cameron Humphreys	1	0	0	0	1
–	DF	England	24	Kyle John	1	0	0	0	1
–	FW	England	23	Jack Shorrock	0	0	0	1	1
–	FW	Switzerland	10	Lorent Tolaj	1	0	0	0	1
–	MF	England	12	Rhys Walters	1	0	0	0	1
				TOTALS	36	9	2	15	63

=== Disciplinary record ===
Number	Nation	Position	Name	EFL League One		FA Cup		EFL Cup		EFL Trophy		Total	
Number	Nation	Position	Name	Yellow card	Red card	Yellow card	Red card	Yellow card	Red card	Yellow card	Red card	Yellow card	Red card
7	Scotland	DF	George Byers	4	1	0	0	0	0	0	0	4	1
3	England	DF	Jaheim Headley	3	1	1	0	0	0	0	0	4	1
14	Belgium	MF	Funso Ojo	8	0	0	0	0	0	0	0	8	0
25	England	DF	Cameron Humphreys	5	0	1	0	0	0	1	0	7	0
24	England	DF	Kyle John	4	0	1	0	1	0	1	0	7	0
6	England	DF	Jordan Gabriel	5	0	1	0	0	0	0	0	6	0
5	England	DF	Connor Hall	5	0	0	0	0	0	1	0	6	0
4	England	DF	Ben Heneghan	5	0	0	0	0	0	1	0	6	0
18	England	MF	Ryan Croasdale	4	0	0	0	0	0	1	0	5	0
15	Guyana	DF	Liam Gordon	4	0	0	0	0	0	1	0	4	0
26	Ireland	MF	Jordan Shipley	2	0	1	0	0	0	1	0	4	0
10	Jamaica	FW	Dajaune Brown	1	0	2	0	0	0	0	0	3	0
33	England	DF	George Hall	2	0	1	0	0	0	0	0	3	0
17	Ireland	FW	Ruari Paton	1	0	1	0	0	0	1	0	3	0
19	New Zealand	FW	Ben Waine	2	0	1	0	0	0	0	0	3	0
2	Wales	DF	Mitch Clark	2	0	0	0	0	0	0	0	2	0
44	England	FW	Devante Cole	2	0	0	0	0	0	0	0	2	0
36	Gambia	FW	Mo Faal	1	0	1	0	0	0	0	0	2	0
35	England	DF	Tyler Magloire	2	0	0	0	0	0	0	0	2	0
45	Netherlands	FW	Martin Sherif	1	0	1	0	0	0	0	0	2	0
9	England	FW	Jayden Stockley	2	0	0	0	0	0	0	0	2	0
11	England	FW	Ethon Archer	1	0	0	0	0	0	0	0	1	0
27	England	DF	Eli Campbell	1	0	0	0	0	0	0	0	1	0
11	Ireland	FW	Ronan Curtis	1	0	0	0	0	0	0	0	1	0
22	England	DF	Jesse Debrah	1	0	0	0	0	0	0	0	1	0
8	England	MF	Ben Garrity	1	0	0	0	0	0	0	0	1	0
46	Australia	GK	Joe Gauci	0	0	1	0	0	0	0	0	1	0
50	Cuba	FW	Onel Hernández	0	0	1	0	0	0	0	0	1	0
12	England	MF	Rhys Walters	1	0	0	0	0	0	0	0	1	0
			TOTALS	71	2	14	0	1	0	8	0	94	2

Sourced from Soccerway.

== Awards ==
End of Season Awards	Winner
Player of the Year	Kyle John
Young Player of the Year	George Hall
Players' Player of the Year	Connor Hall
Supporter Club Player of the Season	Kyle John
Goal of the Season	Ben Waine (vs Sunderland, 8 March 2026)
Top Goalscorer	Ben Waine
Academy Player of the Season	Charlie Bussell
PFA Community Champion	Jayden Stockley

== Transfers ==
=== Transfers in ===
Date from	Pos.	Nationality	Name	From	Fee	Ref.
1 July 2025 (Note: The transfer was announced on 31 May and would become official on 1 July once his contract at Blackpool expired)	RB	ENG	Jordan Gabriel	Blackpool	Free transfer	
1 July 2025 (Note: The transfer was announced on 12 June and would become official on 1 July once his contract at Walsall expired)	LB	GUY	Liam Gordon	Walsall	Free transfer	
1 July 2025 (Note: The transfer was announced on 25 June and would become official on 1 July once his contract at Rotherham United expired)	CB	ENG	Cameron Humphreys	Rotherham United	Free transfer	
1 July 2025 (Note: The transfer was announced on 30 June and would become official on 1 July once his contract at Cambridge United expired)	GK	SVK	Marko Maroši	Cambridge United	Free transfer	
1 July 2025 (Note: The transfer was announced on 10 June and would become official on 1 July once his contract at Aston Villa expired)	CAM	ENG	Rico Richards	Aston Villa	Free transfer	
1 July 2025 (Note: The transfer was announced on 14 June and would become official on 1 July once his contract at Shrewsbury Town expired)	LM	IRL	Jordan Shipley	Shrewsbury Town	Free transfer	
1 July 2025 (Note: The transfer was announced on 30 June and would become official on 1 July once his contract at Plymouth Argyle expired)	ST	NZL	Ben Waine	Plymouth Argyle	Free transfer	
1 September 2025	CF	ENG	Devante Cole	West Bromwich Albion	Free transfer	
1 September 2025	CM	ENG	George Hall	Birmingham City	Undisclosed	
13 October 2025	LWB	ENG	Marvin Johnson	Sheffield Wednesday	Free transfer	
30 January 2026	CB	ENG	Tyler Magloire	Workington	Free transfer	
2 February 2026	CF	JAM	Andre Gray	(Turkey) Fatih Karagümrük	Free transfer	
9 February 2026	LW	CUB	Onel Hernández	Charlton Athletic	Free agent	
9 February 2026	CM	ENG	Grant Ward	Bristol Rovers	Free agent	

=== Transfers out ===
Date from	Pos.	Nationality	Name	To	Fee	Ref.
22 August 2025	CF	SUI	Lorent Tolaj	Plymouth Argyle	Undisclosed (Note: The transfer fee was reported to be £1.2 million.)	
10 January 2026	LW	IRL	Ronan Curtis	Plymouth Argyle	Undisclosed	
17 January 2026	LWB	ENG	Marvin Johnson	Solihull Moors	Released	
28 January 2026	LWB	ENG	James Plant	Tranmere Rovers	Undisclosed	
31 January 2026	CF	ENG	Devante Cole	Luton Town	Undisclosed	
23 June 2026	LM	IRL	Jordan Shipley	Cheltenham Town	Mutual termination	
25 June 2026	CF	IRL	Ruari Paton	(Scotland) St Johnstone	Undisclosed	
30 June 2026	GK	ENG	Ben Amos	Burnley	Released	
30 June 2026	RB	WAL	Mitch Clark	Swindon Town	Released	
30 June 2026	GK	ENG	Arron Davies	(Wales) Cardiff Met	Released	
30 June 2026	CB	ENG	Jesse Debrah		Released	
30 June 2026	CF	JAM	Andre Gray		Released	
30 June 2026	LB	ENG	Sam Hart	Dorking Wanderers	Released	
30 June 2026	CB	ENG	Ben Heneghan	Crawley Town	Released	
30 June 2026	CB	ENG	Ben Lomax	Chester	Released	
30 June 2026	CB	ENG	Tyler Magloire	Buxton	Released	
30 June 2026	CM	BEL	Funso Ojo		Released	
30 June 2026	CM	ENG	Grant Ward		Released	

=== Loaned in ===
Date from	Pos.	Nationality	Name	From	Date until	Ref.
7 August 2025	ST	GAM	Mo Faal	(Wales) Wrexham	23 January 2026	
11 August 2025	GK	AUS	Joe Gauci	Aston Villa	End of season	
27 August 2025	ST	JAM	Dajaune Brown	Derby County	End of season	
21 January 2026	LW	ENG	Ethon Archer	Luton Town	End of season	
1 February 2026	CB	ENG	Eli Campbell	Everton	End of season	
1 February 2026	ST	NED	Martin Sherif	Everton	End of season	

=== Loaned out ===
Date from	Pos.	Nationality	Name	To	Date until	Ref.
31 July 2025	CM	ENG	Liam Brazier	Warrington Town	14 November 2025	
31 July 2025	CM	ENG	Logan Cousins	Kidsgrove Athletic	23 October 2025	
31 July 2025	LB	ENG	Zayn Sadiq	Kidsgrove Athletic	23 October 2025	
19 August 2025	GK	ENG	Arron Davies	Stafford Rangers	End of season	
20 August 2025	RW	ENG	James Plant	Yeovil Town	9 January 2026	
23 August 2025	CF	ENG	Eddie Lake	Newcastle Town	25 August 2025	
1 September 2025	CAM	ENG	Rico Richards	Walsall	End of season	
3 September 2025	LB	ENG	Sam Hart	(Scotland) Falkirk	End of season	
7 October 2025	CB	ENG	Tomasi Wara	Stafford Rangers	30 January 2026	
25 October 2025	CM	ENG	Logan Cousins	Stafford Rangers	3 January 2026	
31 October 2025	LWB	ENG	Jack Shorrock	Chester	10 January 2026	
19 January 2026	CM	ENG	Logan Cousins	Kidsgrove Athletic	End of season	
30 January 2026	CB	ENG	Jesse Debrah	Bromley	End of season	
31 January 2026	LB	ENG	Zayn Sadiq	Kidsgrove Athletic	End of season	
2 February 2026	RB	WAL	Mitch Clark	Fleetwood Town	End of season	
2 February 2026	CF	IRL	Ruari Paton	(Scotland) St Johnstone	End of season	
6 February 2026	GK	SVK	Marko Maroši	Tranmere Rovers	6 March 2026	
11 February 2026	CM	ENG	Liam Brazier	Stourbridge	End of season	
14 March 2026	GK	SVK	Marko Maroši	Tranmere Rovers	21 March 2026	
