= Ceiran Loney =

Scottish footballer (born 2008)

Personal information
- Full name: Ceiran Loney
- Date of birth: 13 March 2008 (age 18)
- Place of birth: Glasgow, Scotland
- Position: Striker

Team information
- Current team: Everton
- Number: 68

Youth career
- 2017–2024: Partick Thistle

Senior career*
Years	Team	Apps	(Gls)
2024	Partick Thistle	1	(0)
2024–	Everton	0	(0)

International career
2024–	Scotland U17	3	(0)
- * Club domestic league appearances and goals as of 19:10, 8 July 2025 (UTC)

Ceiran Loney (born 14 March 2008) is a Scottish professional footballer who plays as a striker for Everton.

== Career ==
=== Partick Thistle ===
Loney came through the ranks of the Partick Thistle youth academy, after signing at the age of nine.

While a part of the Thistle youth squad Loney was linked with moves to English Premier League sides Everton and Brighton and Hove Albion, with Loney training with both teams during the 2023–24 season.

Loney made his professional debut on the final day of the 2023–24 Scottish Championship season for Partick Thistle as a substitute against champions Dundee United, becoming the youngest ever Partick Thistle player to play for the first team in the club's history.

=== Everton ===
In July 2024 Loney joined English Premier League club Everton for an undisclosed fee.

In July 2025 Loney signed his first professional contract with Everton, signing a two-year deal.

== Career statistics ==
=== Club ===
As of match played 4 November 2026

Appearances and goals by club, season and competition
Club	Season	League			National cup (Note: Includes Scottish Cup)		League cup (Note: Includes Scottish League Cup)		Other		Total	
Club	Season	Division	Apps	Goals	Apps	Goals	Apps	Goals	Apps	Goals	Apps	Goals
Partick Thistle	2023–24	Scottish Championship	1	0	—		—		0	0	1	0
Everton U21	2025–26	—			—		—		1 (Note: Appearance(s) in EFL Trophy)	0	1	0
Career total			1	0	0	0	0	0	1	0	2	0
