= Rhys Walters =

English footballer (born 2005)

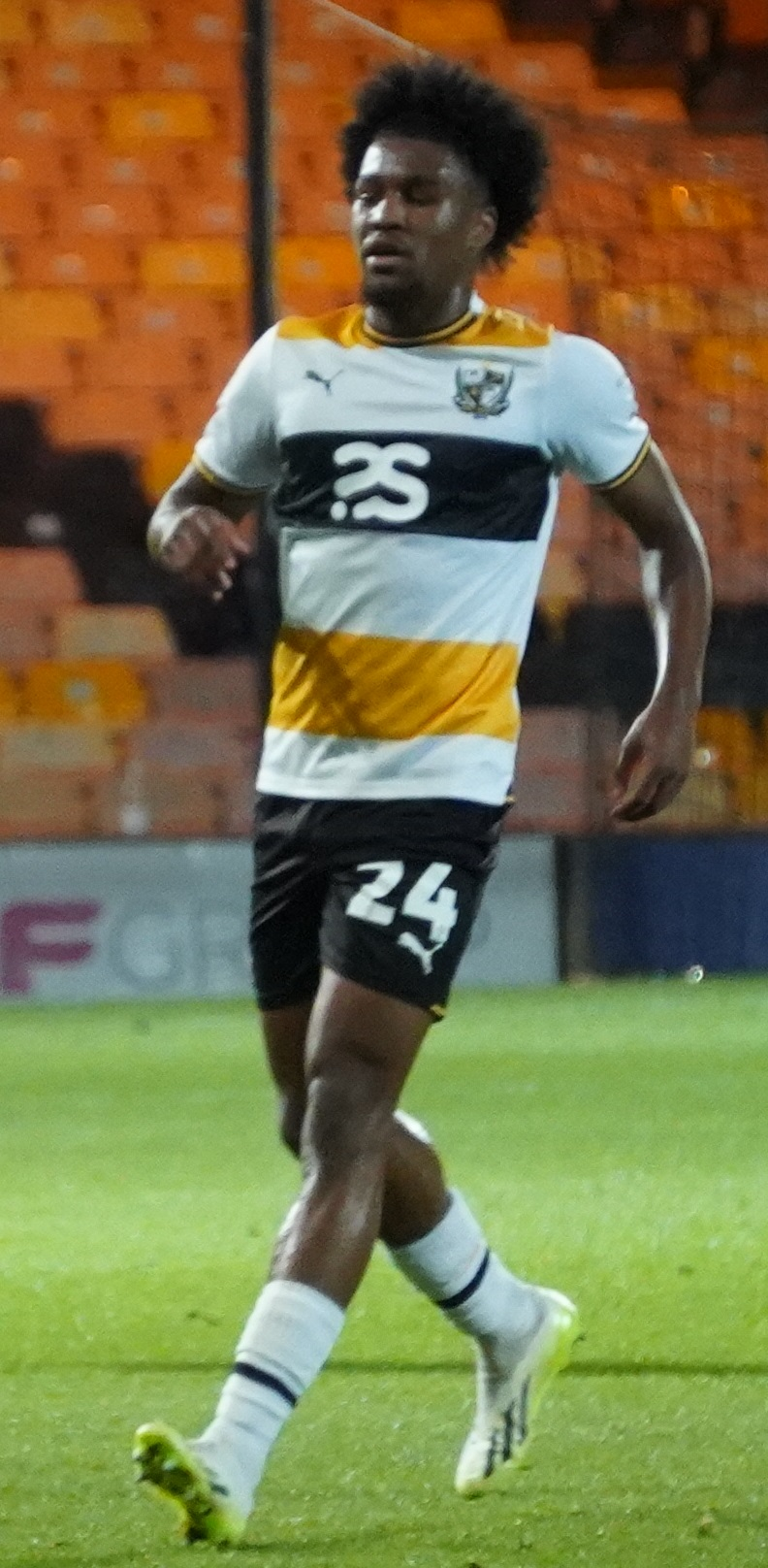
- Walters with Port Vale in 2023

Personal information
- Full name: Rhys Anthony Walters
- Date of birth: 18 November 2005 (age 21)
- Place of birth: Wolverhampton, England
- Position: Midfielder

Team information
- Current team: Port Vale
- Number: 38

Youth career
- 2015–2022: Port Vale

Senior career*
Years	Team	Apps	(Gls)
2022–	Port Vale	62	(1)
2023	→ Leek Town (loan)	4	(0)
- * Club domestic league appearances and goals as of 10:22, 22 November 2026 (UTC)

Rhys Anthony Walters (born 18 November 2005) is an English professional footballer who plays as a midfielder for EFL League Two club Port Vale. He has previously played on loan at Leek Town. He was promoted out of League Two with Port Vale at the end of the 2024–25 season.

== Career ==
At nine, Walters joined the youth set-up at Port Vale. He made his first-team debut at the age of 16 on 18 October 2022, coming on for Mipo Odubeko 89 minutes into a 2–0 win over Wolverhampton Wanderers U21 in an EFL Trophy group stage game at Vale Park. On 4 March 2023, he joined Northern Premier League Division One West club Leek Town on a work experience loan agreement until the end of the 2022–23 season.

Walters made his first start for Port Vale on 29 August 2023, in a 0–0 draw with Crewe Alexandra in the second round of the EFL Cup; he was substituted on 57 minutes, going on to win the man of the match award. Seven days later, he played his first full 90 minutes for the club in a 1–0 victory against the same opponents in a group stage game of the EFL Trophy, where he was paired in the centre of midfield with the experienced Jason Lowe. He provided the assist for Josh Thomas to score the first goal in a 2–1 win over Sutton United in the third round of the EFL Cup on 26 September. He was named as man of the match in the EFL Trophy tie with Newcastle United U21 on 10 October. Speaking the following month, manager Andy Crosby said that "his performances have gradually improved with the more experience he gets", but that he needed to find an "aggressive edge". However a contract was left unsigned due to objections from the player's agent. In April 2024, new manager Darren Moore said that "we feel though he is at a level where he can contribute to the team". He picked up a foot injury in the last game of the 2023–24 season. Contract talks had remained at a stalemate since the start of the year.

The club left a contract offer on the table for the 2024–25 season as Walters had unsuccessful trials elsewhere. He had a trial game with Norwich City Under-21s in November 2024. On 10 January 2025, Walters returned to Port Vale on an initial three-and-a-half-year deal. Moore said that Walters was the team's "best player by a country mile" in a 2–1 defeat at Colchester United on 11 March, his second game since returning to the club. He went on to be voted as the club's Player of the Month for March by readers of The Valiant substack. He started five of the club's six games in April, whilst being a key substitute in the other game, as the Vale secured promotion back into League One.

He found himself out of the starting eleven for the majority of the 2025–26 season under Darren Moore, though new manager Jon Brady described him as an "exceptional talent" in February. He scored his first career goal on 17 March in a 3–2 defeat at Blackpool. He made 18 league starts as Vale were relegated back to League Two and new manager Jon Brady suggested that he would like to play Walters as a number eight rather than as a holding midfielder.

== Style of play ==
Walters is a midfielder with good vision. Port Vale manager Darren Moore said that he "can get himself out of tight situations with his ability, he has a wonderful engine, is creative when he goes forward but is powerful and does his work off the ball".

== Career statistics ==
As of match played 21 November 2026

Appearances and goals by club, season and competition
Club	Season	League			FA Cup		EFL Cup		Other		Total	
Club	Season	Division	Apps	Goals	Apps	Goals	Apps	Goals	Apps	Goals	Apps	Goals
Port Vale	2022–23	EFL League One	0	0	0	0	0	0	1 (Note: Appearances in the EFL Trophy.)	0	1	0
Port Vale	2023–24	EFL League One	11	0	3	0	3	0	4	0	21	0
Port Vale	2024–25	EFL League Two	13	0	—		—		1	0	14	0
Port Vale	2025–26	EFL League One	26	1	4	0	3	0	4	0	37	1
Port Vale	2026–27	EFL League Two	12	0	1	0	1	0	2	0	16	0
Port Vale	Total		62	1	8	0	7	0	12	0	89	1
Leek Town (loan)	2022–23	Northern Premier League; Division One West	4	0	—		—		—		4	0
Career total			66	1	8	0	7	0	12	0	93	1

== Honours ==
Port Vale

- EFL League Two second-place promotion: 2024–25
