= Liam Brazier =

English footballer (born 2007)

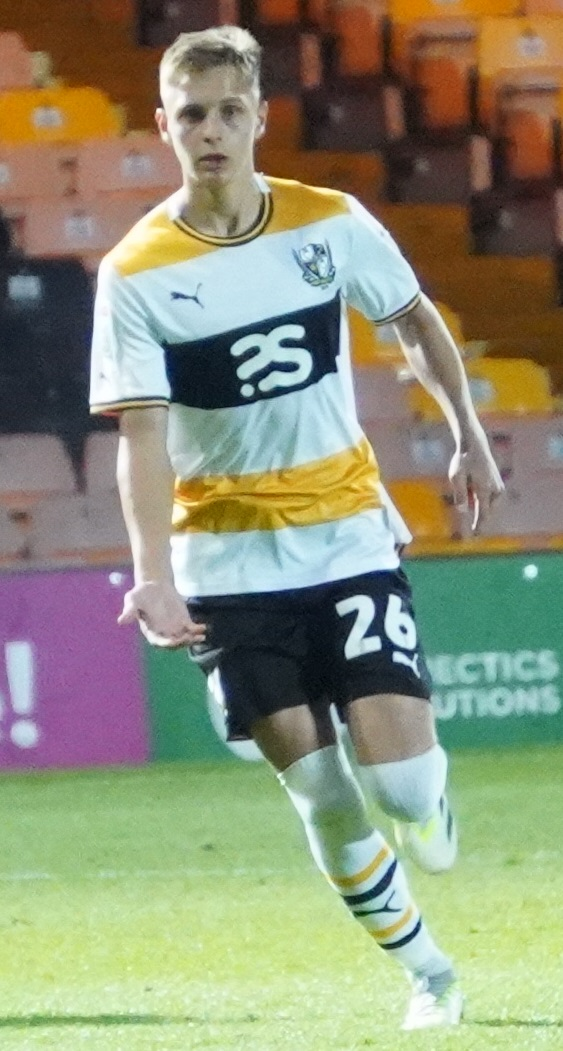
- Brazier with Port Vale in 2023

Personal information
- Full name: Liam Mathew Brazier
- Date of birth: January 2007 (age 19)
- Place of birth: Stockton Brook, Staffordshire, England
- Position: Midfielder

Team information
- Current team: Stourbridge

Youth career
- –2023: Port Vale

Senior career*
Years	Team	Apps	(Gls)
2023–2026	Port Vale	0	(0)
2025	→ Stafford Rangers (loan)	11	(1)
2025–2026	→ Warrington Town (loan)	21	(1)
2026	→ Stourbridge (loan)	13	(3)
2026–	Stourbridge	0	(0)
- * Club domestic league appearances and goals as of 17:06, 27 April 2026 (UTC)

Liam Mathew Brazier (born January 2007) is an English footballer who plays as a midfielder for Southern League Premier Division Central club Stourbridge. He was a youth team player at Port Vale and played on loan at Stafford Rangers, Warrington Town and Stourbridge.

== Career ==
=== Port Vale ===
Brazier made his first-team debut for Port Vale after coming on as a substitute in a 1–0 win over Crewe Alexandra in an EFL Trophy group stage game at Vale Park on 5 September 2023. He was linked with a move to German club Borussia Dortmund in December 2023.

On 4 January 2025, Brazier joined Northern Premier League Division One West club Stafford Rangers on a work experience loan. He had to wait until 28 January before making his debut for Rangers after he convinced caretaker manager Graham Deakin to give him a chance in the first-team. Brazier rewarded Deakin with a goal and an assist in a 3–1 win at Runcorn Linnets that took Boro out of the relegation zone. At the end of the 2024–25 season, Brazier had his scholarship extended into a third year.

On 28 July 2025, Brazier joined Northern Premier League Premier Division club Warrington Town on loan, though he continued to train with the Vale team in the day. He played 27 games for the Yellows, scoring one goal, before he returned to Port Vale on 3 February.

=== Stourbridge ===
On 11 February 2026, Brazier joined Southern League Premier Division Central side Stourbridge on loan. He was released from Port Vale when his scholarship finished at the end of the 2025–26 season, and subsequently signed permanently with Stourbridge.

== Style of play ==
Brazier is an attacking midfielder who can play on the left, right or the center of the pitch, offering versatility and high fitness levels.

== Career statistics ==
As of match played 25 April 2026

Appearances and goals by club, season and competition
Club	Season	League			FA Cup		EFL Cup		Other		Total	
Club	Season	Division	Apps	Goals	Apps	Goals	Apps	Goals	Apps	Goals	Apps	Goals
Port Vale	2023–24	EFL League One	0	0	0	0	0	0	3 (Note: Appearance(s) in the EFL Trophy)	0	3	0
Port Vale	2024–25	EFL League Two	0	0	0	0	0	0	0	0	0	0
Port Vale	2025–26	EFL League One	0	0	0	0	0	0	0	0	0	0
Port Vale	Total		0	0	0	0	0	0	3	0	3	0
Stafford Rangers (loan)	2024–25	Northern Premier League; Division One West	11	1	—		—		0	0	11	1
Warrington Town (loan)	2025–26	Northern Premier League; Premier Division	21	1	1	0	—		3 (Note: 1 appearance in the FA Trophy, 2 appearances in the Cheshire Senior Cup)	0	25	1
Stourbridge (loan)	2025–26	Southern League; Premier Division Central	13	3	—		—		—		13	3
Stourbridge	2026–27	Southern League; Premier Division Central	0	0	0	0	—		0	0	0	0
Stourbridge	Total		13	3	0	0	0	0	0	0	13	3
Career total			45	5	1	0	0	0	6	0	52	5
