= George Hall (footballer, born 2004) =

English footballer

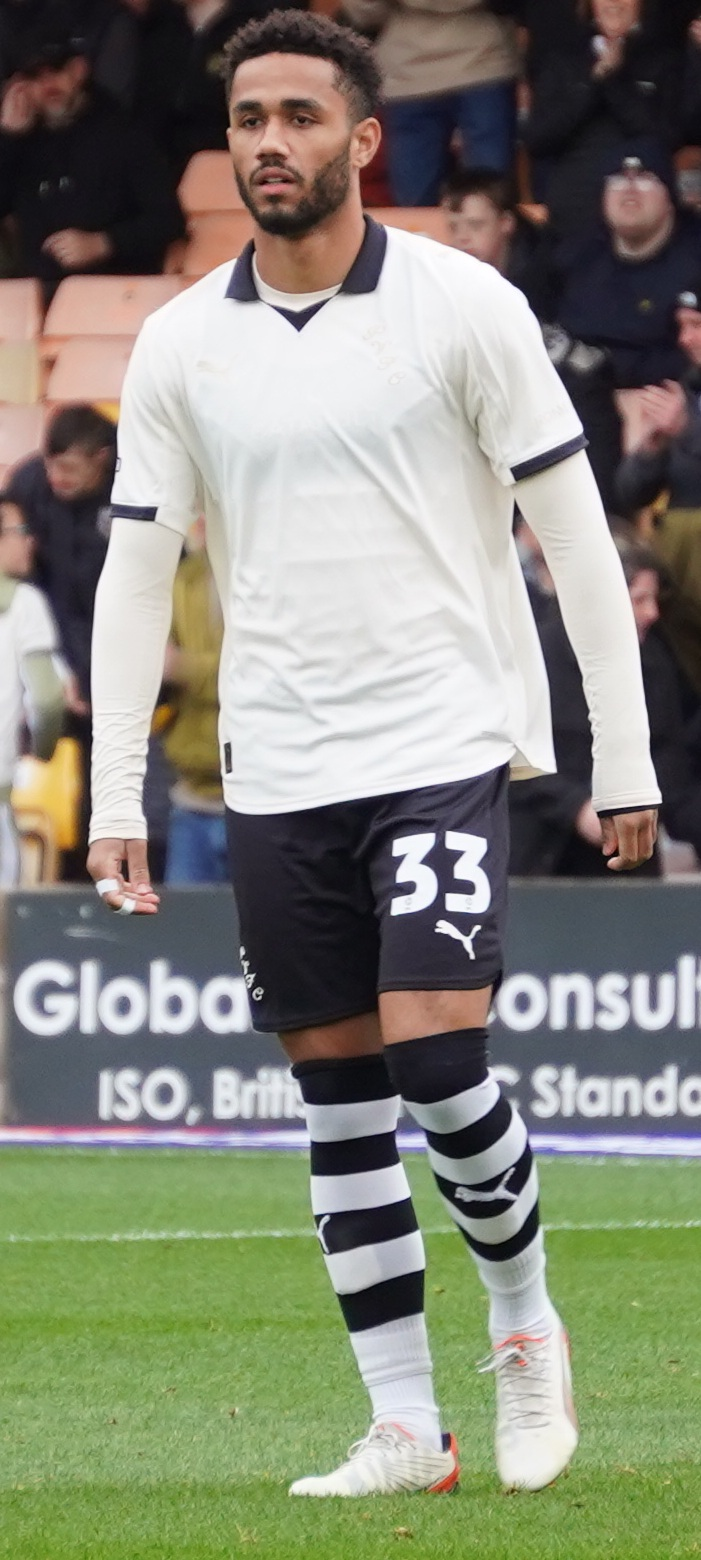
- Hall with Port Vale (2025)

Personal information
- Full name: George Cardinal Joseph Hall
- Date of birth: 15 July 2004 (age 22)
- Place of birth: Redditch, England
- Height: 1.75 m (5 ft 9 in)
- Position: Midfielder

Team information
- Current team: Port Vale
- Number: 33

Youth career
- 2012–2021: Birmingham City

Senior career*
Years	Team	Apps	(Gls)
2021–2025	Birmingham City	40	(2)
2024–2025	→ Walsall (loan)	14	(2)
2025–	Port Vale	50	(1)

International career
2021–2022	England U18	8	(1)
2022–2023	England U19	6	(2)
- * Club domestic league appearances and goals as of 10:23, 22 November 2026 (UTC)

George Cardinal Joseph Hall (born 15 July 2004) is an English professional footballer who plays as a midfielder for EFL League Two club Port Vale. He has represented England at under-18 and under-19 levels.

Hall joined the Academy of Birmingham City in 2012. He progressed through the youth ranks and made his senior debut in January 2022. He became a first-team regular in the 2022–23 campaign, winning the club's Young Player of the Season award. He then struggled with injury problems and spent the 2024–25 season on loan at Walsall, featuring in the club's League Two play-off final defeat. He signed with Port Vale in September 2025.

== Early life and career ==
Hall was born in Redditch, Worcestershire, where he lived in the Walkwood district and attended Astwood Bank First School and St Bede's Catholic Middle School. He helped their Year 8 football team reach the final of the ESFA Under-13 Schools' Cup, and scored the second goal of their 2–0 win in the final. He joined Birmingham City's academy from Headless Cross under-8s in 2012, and took up a two-year scholarship with the club in July 2020. According to the then head of professional development phase, Mike Dodds, "He was a very versatile player in the younger age groups before holding down a regular position in the centre of midfield in his Under-16 season. Athletic and box-to-box, he has started to show good signs of progression both technically and tactically."

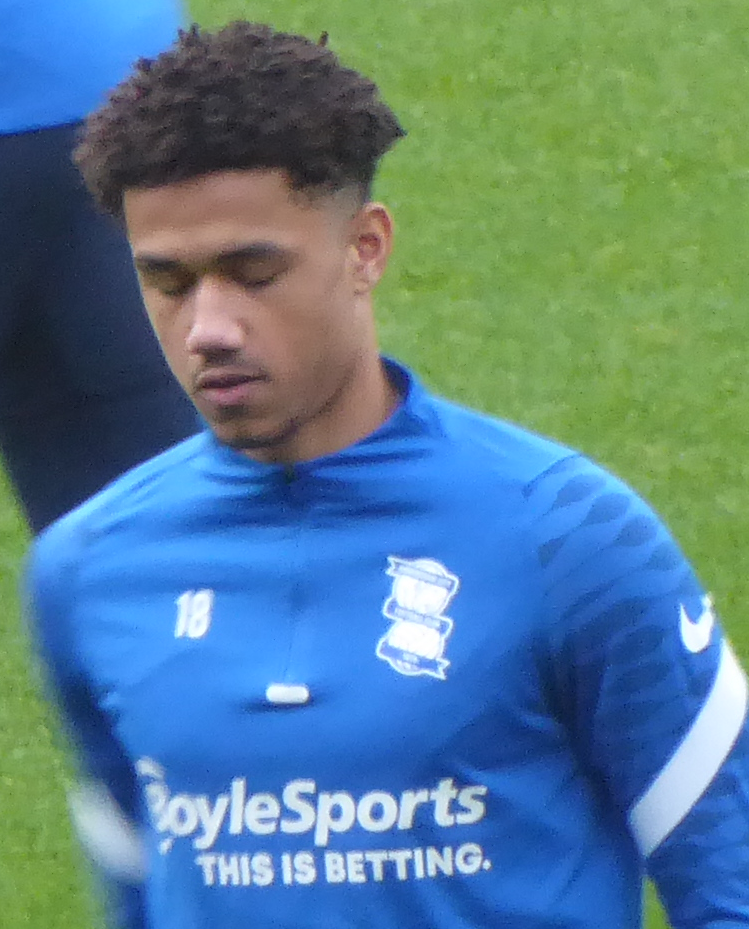
Hall with Birmingham City in 2022

== Club career ==
=== Birmingham City ===
Hall was a member of Birmingham's under-18 team that finished as runners-up in the Northern Section of their league in the 2020–21 season, and came from behind against Charlton Athletic's U18 in the national semi-finals only to lose to a last-minute goal. As well as playing for the under-18s, he started several matches for Birmingham's under-23 team in the 2021–22 Premier League 2 campaign. Amid reported interest from Premier League clubs including Brighton & Hove Albion, Leeds United, Newcastle United and Southampton, Birmingham did not want to risk losing Hall the same way that they lost Amari Miller to Leeds. Hall signed his first professional contract with Birmingham on 24 November 2021. Under-18s coach Martyn Olorenshaw described him as "an attacking midfielder with an ability to create and score goals [who] is explosive, dynamic and has the prowess to influence games."

He was an unused substitute for Birmingham's Championship visit to Millwall on 4 December, and he made his senior debut on 2 January 2022, starting alongside fellow 17-year-old Jordan James in support of Troy Deeney at home to Queens Park Rangers. He played 84 minutes before manager Lee Bowyer replaced him with Scott Hogan as Birmingham tried and failed to come back from 2–1 down. He scored his first senior goal on 16 August 2022, opening the scoring in a 1–1 draw at home to Watford in the Championship. Manager John Eustace said it was his "top priority" to keep Hall at the club as he was "one of the top young players in the league". Despite interruptions due to injury, Hall made 30 Championship appearances during his breakthrough campaign, and was voted Birmingham's Young Player of the Season for 2022–23.

On 1 September 2023, Hall signed a three-year contract extension with Birmingham City, and said, "there is a different feel around the place and I am happy to be here for a few more years. I feel like we are going in one direction and that is upwards. I wanted to be a part of it, especially being here for so long." He missed much of the 2023–24 season with hamstring – suffering four hamstring injuries in 10 months – and other injuries, but was able to make a few substitute appearances in the latter stages of the campaign as the team failed to avoid relegation to League One.

Hall joined League Two club Walsall on 30 August 2024 on loan for the season as he aimed to play regular first-team football. Birmingham had been taken over by American investors, leading to an influx of new signings at the club and reduced playing opportunities for Hall at St Andrew's. Walsall head coach Mat Sadler said that Hall had arrived at the club with "mental scars" due to his repeated hamstring injuries. He scored his first league goal for Walsall in a 3–2 win over Notts County on 3 December at the Bescot Stadium, where he was also named as the man of the match. He continued to suffer injuries, missing almost a month with a back issue and four months after his hamstring injuries required surgery. During his absence, Walsall had slipped from the top of the table into the play-offs. He recovered to start in the play-off final defeat to AFC Wimbledon at Wembley Stadium. New Birmingham manager Chris Davies allowed him to leave the club on a permanent basis, saying he was a "top professional".

=== Port Vale ===
On 1 September 2025, Hall signed a three-year deal with League One club Port Vale. Manager Darren Moore said he would have to wait before making his debut as he had had a "scattered" pre-season. He was played at right-wing back after the club sustained a series of injuries in the position. Speaking in November, Moore stated his regret at having to play Hall in his less natural defensive roles due to injuries in the team. Hall was voted as January's joint-player of the month by readers of The Valiant substack. He played in central midfield, right wing, right-wing back and up front, though was settled into midfield by new manager Jon Brady. He was named as the club's Young Player of the Year for the 2025–26 season, which culminated in relegation for the club.

== International career ==
Hall received his first call-up to the England under-18 squad in November 2021. He played in all three of England's matches in the Pinatar Tournament in Spain, starting in a loss to the Netherlands and a win against Portugal and coming on in a goalless draw with Belgium, and made two more appearances in March 2022. Hall scored his first international goal during a 3–2 victory over Austria in Croatia on 7 June 2022.

After eight appearances for the under-18s, Hall was included in the England under-19 squad for three Euro qualifiers to be played in Denmark. He made his under-19 debut on 21 September 2022, starting in a 2–0 win over Montenegro. He earned a total of six caps at under-19 level, scoring two goals.

== Style of play ==
Hall is an athletic box-to-box midfielder who likes to "win the ball [and] drive [forward] with it". He had been coached into that position at youth level by Paul Harsley.

== Career statistics ==
As of match played 21 November 2026

Appearances and goals by club, season and competition
Club	Season	League			FA Cup		EFL Cup		Other		Total	
Club	Season	Division	Apps	Goals	Apps	Goals	Apps	Goals	Apps	Goals	Apps	Goals
Birmingham City	2021–22	Championship	2	0	0	0	0	0	—		2	0
Birmingham City	2022–23	Championship	30	2	0	0	0	0	—		30	2
Birmingham City	2023–24	Championship	8	0	0	0	1	0	—		9	0
Birmingham City	2024–25	League One	0	0	0	0	0	0	0	0	0	0
Birmingham City	2025–26	Championship	0	0	0	0	0	0	—		0	0
Birmingham City	Total		40	2	0	0	1	0	—		41	2
Walsall (loan)	2024–25	League Two	14	2	2	0	—		5 (Note: Three appearances and one goal in EFL Trophy, two appearances in EFL League Two play-offs)	1	21	3
Port Vale	2025–26	League One	37	1	5	1	1	0	4 (Note: Appearance(s) in EFL Trophy)	1	47	3
Port Vale	2026–27	League Two	13	0	1	0	1	0	3	0	18	0
Port Vale	Total		50	1	6	1	2	0	7	1	65	3
Career total			104	5	8	1	3	0	12	2	127	8

== Honours ==
Individual

- Birmingham City Young Player of the Season: 2022–23
