= Mitch Clark (footballer, born 1999) =

Welsh footballer (born 1999)

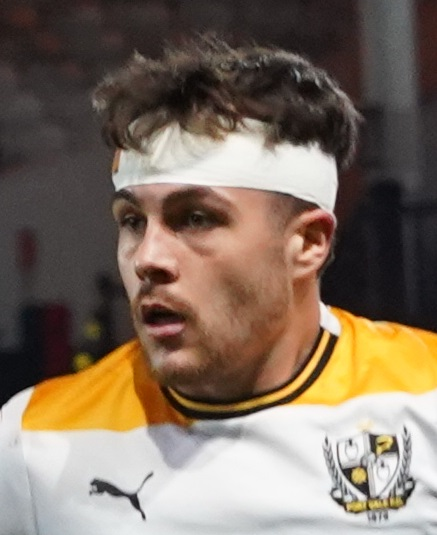
- Clark with Port Vale in 2023

Personal information
- Full name: Mitchell Reece Clark
- Date of birth: 13 March 1999 (age 27)
- Place of birth: Nuneaton, England
- Height: 5 ft 8 in (1.73 m)
- Position: Defender

Team information
- Current team: Swindon Town
- Number: 2

Youth career
- 2006–2017: Aston Villa

Senior career*
Years	Team	Apps	(Gls)
2017–2019	Aston Villa	0	(0)
2018–2019	→ Port Vale (loan)	40	(0)
2019–2021	Leicester City	0	(0)
2020	→ Port Vale (loan)	4	(0)
2020	→ Port Vale (loan)	11	(1)
2021–2023	Accrington Stanley	65	(1)
2023–2026	Port Vale	45	(1)
2026	→ Fleetwood Town (loan)	14	(0)
2026–	Swindon Town	5	(0)

International career
2015–2016	Wales U17	6	(0)
2016–2017	Wales U19	8	(0)
- * Club domestic league appearances and goals as of 13:40, 12 April 2026 (UTC)

Mitchell Reece Clark (born 13 March 1999) is a professional footballer who plays as a defender for EFL League Two club Swindon Town. He has represented Wales at youth level.

A graduate of the Academy at Aston Villa, he spent the 2018–19 season on loan at Port Vale. He joined Leicester City in July 2019 following his release from Aston Villa. He returned on loan to Port Vale for the second half of the 2019–20 season and first half of the 2020–21 season. He signed with Accrington Stanley in August 2021, where he would remain for two seasons before joining Port Vale permanently in July 2023. He was promoted out of League Two with the club at the end of the 2024–25 season. He joined Fleetwood Town on loan in February 2026 and transferred to Swindon Town four months later.

== Club career ==
=== Aston Villa ===
Clark graduated through the Academy at Aston Villa, having been scouted by the club playing for Bedworth Eagles juniors at the age of eight. He signed professional forms at age 17. He made his first-team debut for the "Villans" in the EFL Cup on 22 August 2017, starting the match at left-back in a 4–1 victory over Wigan Athletic at Villa Park. Manager Steve Bruce said that "he had a very good debut considering that he's played out of position". He was a part of the under-23 squad that finished as runners-up of the Premier League 2 Division Two and won the Premier League Cup during the 2017–18 season. He signed a new contract in March 2018 to keep him at the club until 2019.

On 16 August 2018, Clark joined League Two club Port Vale on loan for the rest of the 2018–19 season. Manager Neil Aspin signed him to provide cover at full-back for James Gibbons and Cristian Montaño, after football adviser John Rudge had scouted him playing for the Aston Villa under-23 side. He made his English Football League debut two days later, starting at left-back for the "Valiants" in a 1–0 win over Crawley Town at Vale Park. He retained his first-team place as the "Valiants" went on a run of poor run of results. However, Clark was noted as being one of their better performers. He made a costly mistake to give away a goal during the opening minute of a 2–0 defeat at Grimsby Town on 6 October, but recovered from his mistake and kept his place in the team. He remained a key first-team player under new manager John Askey and played a total of 45 games throughout the 2018–19 season, mainly at right-back, where he linked up well with right-sided midfielder David Worrall. On 3 May, upon returning from his loan spell, Clark was released by Aston Villa manager Dean Smith; his agent claimed there was interest from numerous clubs and said that "I believe that I can take him on to bigger and better things than what he's doing at Port Vale." He went on to change agents the following year, signing with Sports Management International.

=== Leicester City ===
On 26 July 2019, Clark signed a three-year deal with Premier League club Leicester City and was placed in Steve Beaglehole's under-23 squad. On 30 January 2020, Clark rejoined Port Vale on loan until the end of the 2019–20 season. He made an impressive second debut two days later, forcing an own goal with a dangerous cross in a 1–1 home draw with Salford City. However, he received a straight red card for a reckless late challenge during a 3–2 win at Forest Green Rovers on 11 February. His second loan spell was ended on just four appearances as the league was ended early due to the COVID-19 pandemic in England. He had won a penalty in the final game, though the referee chose to overturn his decision, and the game ended goalless with Vale missing out on the play-offs by points per game.

Clark was nominated for the Professional Development League Player of the Month award for September 2020. On 9 October, he joined Port Vale for a third loan spell after James Gibbons picked up a long-term injury. He scored his first goal in professional football on 24 October, in a 2–1 win at Oldham Athletic. He made 12 appearances in the first half of the 2020–21 season, though did not feature in December due to "personal reasons" and Askey confirmed that Port Vale would not try to extend the loan deal. Clark had a trial with Blackpool in July 2021.

=== Accrington Stanley ===
On 26 August 2021, Clark signed a two-year deal with League One side Accrington Stanley. He scored Stanley's equalising goal in the 1–1 draw with Sunderland at the Crown Ground on 15 January. On 26 February, he was sent off in stoppage-time of a 3–2 home win over Wycombe Wanderers for a late challenge on Dominic Gape. Manager John Coleman said that it was "a debatable red card" and that "I feel for Mitch as he will miss three games and he has been our best player over the last couple of months". Clark made 27 appearances in the 2021–22 campaign as Accrington posted a 12th-place finish. He played 49 games in the 2022–23 season as Accrington were relegated in 21st-place. In May 2023, he was charged by The Football Association after allegedly breaching betting rules by placing 312 bets on football matches between 8 February 2022 and 10 March 2023; he was later given a suspended three-month ban and a fine of £600. On 20 May 2023, it was announced Clark would leave the club when his contract ended on 30 June.

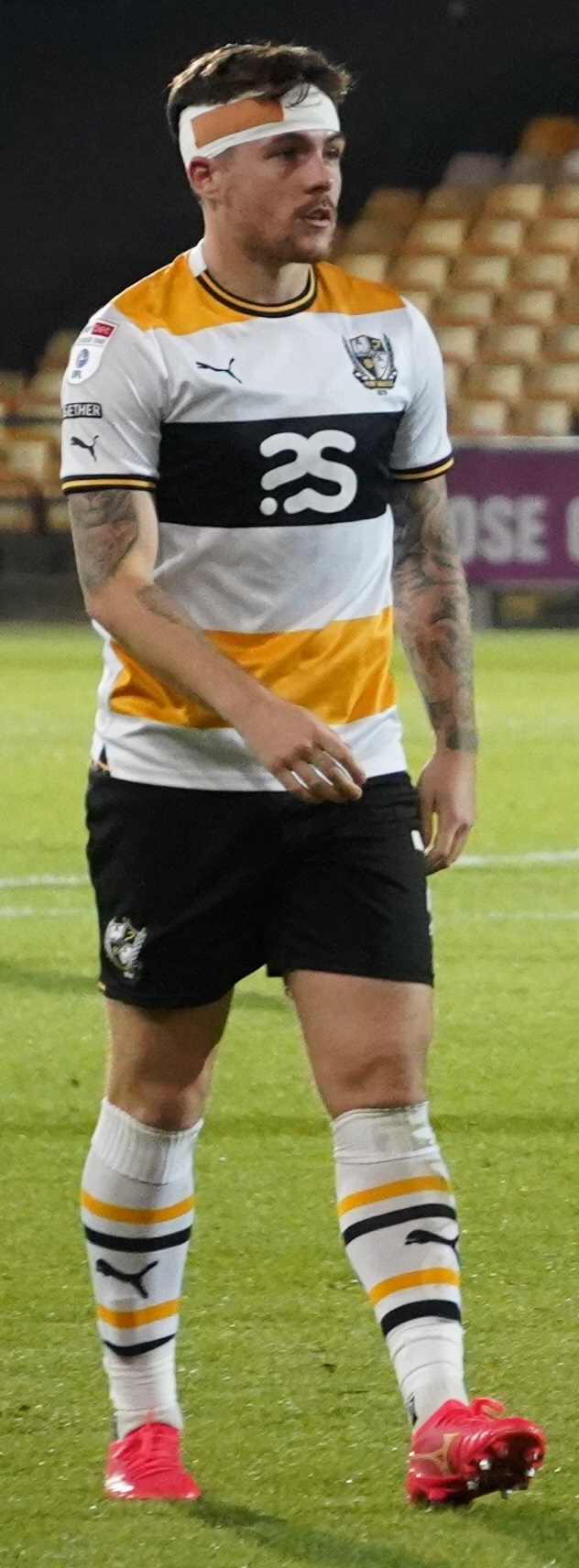
Clark playing on from a head injury for Port Vale in October 2023

=== Port Vale ===
On 2 July 2023, Clark returned for a fourth spell at Port Vale, this time signing a two-year contract after what director of football David Flitcroft described as "lengthy negotiations". However, on 24 October he suffered a meniscus tear during a 1–0 defeat at Peterborough United and manager Andy Crosby revealed that he was ruled out of action until the following March after surgery showed that the meniscus was in a really poor condition. He made his return in a 3–0 defeat at Derby County on 2 March when he came on as a substitute for James Plant, who had himself not featured since October due to injury. However, later that month he sustained a muscle injury in training which ruled him out of action for the rest of the 2023–24 season.

Clark sustained a serious neck injury following what manager Darren Moore described as "just a little incident" in pre-season that saw him ruled out for a significant part of the 2024–25 campaign. He returned to action in December. He was named as player of the match on his third league start of the season, a 3–2 victory over Newport County on 18 January. However, seven days later he was sent off for going over the ball and on to Aribim Pepple's ankle in a standing challenge during a 1–1 draw at Chesterfield. He soon returned to the starting eleven and made consistently strong performances throughout March and April. Promotion was secured at the end of the season and Clark signed a one-year contract extension.

He started the 2025–26 campaign at right-wing-back as new signing Jordan Lawrence-Gabriel was injured. Clark himself was then sidelined for one month at the start of September after sustaining a muscle injury. He played in the EFL Cup defeat to Arsenal, though sustained another muscle injury during the match. On 2 February 2026, he joined League Two side Fleetwood Town on loan until the end of the 2025–26 season. He had been identified by former teammate Luke Joyce, who was now working as Fleetwood's head of recruitment. Vale manager Jon Brady felt he had enough cover at right-back in Jordan Gabriel and Kyle John, and that Clark could have the chance to earn a contract elsewhere. Clark played 14 games for Fleetwood. He returned to Vale Park to find himself transfer listed, and so created a Twitter account in order to thank fans for their support.

=== Swindon Town ===
On 17 June 2026, Clark signed a one-year deal (with a further 12-month option) at League Two club Swindon Town. On 12 September, he was sent off during a 4–0 defeat at York City and apologised to Robins fans after the match.

== International career ==
Clark represented the Wales under-17 team and went on to be named as captain of the under-19 side by manager Paul Bodin.

== Style of play ==
Clark is primarily a right-back but is also able to play as a right-sided centre-back or at left-back. He is a pacey player with high energy levels who likes to get forward and attack.

== Personal life ==
Clark is a Newcastle United supporter owing to his family's roots in Tyneside. He overcame a gambling addiction in 2023.

== Career statistics ==
As of match played 18 April 2026

Appearances and goals by club, season and competition
Club	Season	League			FA Cup		EFL Cup		Other		Total	
Club	Season	Division	Apps	Goals	Apps	Goals	Apps	Goals	Apps	Goals	Apps	Goals
Aston Villa	2017–18	Championship	0	0	0	0	1	0	—		1	0
Port Vale (loan)	2018–19	League Two	40	0	1	0	—		4 (Note: Appearance(s) in the EFL Trophy)	0	45	0
Leicester City U21	2019–20	—			—		—		5	0	5	0
Leicester City U21	2020–21	—			—		—		1	0	1	0
Leicester City U21	Leicester City U21 total		0	0	0	0	0	0	6	0	6	0
Port Vale (loan)	2019–20	League Two	4	0	—		—		—		4	0
Port Vale (loan)	2020–21	League Two	11	1	1	0	—		0	0	12	1
Accrington Stanley	2021–22	League One	25	1	0	0	—		2	0	27	1
Accrington Stanley	2022–23	League One	40	0	2	0	1	0	6	0	49	0
Accrington Stanley	Accrington Stanley total		65	1	2	0	1	0	8	0	76	1
Port Vale	2023–24	League One	13	0	0	0	0	0	2	0	15	0
Port Vale	2024–25	League Two	20	1	0	0	0	0	2	0	22	1
Port Vale	2025–26	League One	12	0	1	0	2	0	1	0	16	0
Port Vale	Port Vale total		100	2	3	0	2	0	9	0	114	2
Fleetwood Town (loan)	2025–26	League Two	14	0	—		—		—		14	0
Swindon Town	2026–27	League Two	0	0	0	0	0	0	0	0	0	0
Career total			179	3	5	0	4	0	23	0	211	3

== Honours ==
Aston Villa Academy

- Premier League 2 Division Two: 2017–18
- Premier League Cup: 2017–18

Port Vale

- EFL League Two second-place promotion: 2024–25
