= Everton F.C. Under-21s and Academy =

Football academy in England

Everton Under-21s, the youth team of Everton, compete in Premier League 2 and play their home matches at Walton Hall Park.

Both the Under-21 and Development squad players have been based at their Finch Farm training complex since its completion in 2007.

== Players ==
As of 18 November 2026

=== Under-21 squad ===
Note: Flags indicate national team as defined under FIFA eligibility rules; some limited exceptions apply. Players may hold more than one non-FIFA nationality.

No.	Pos.	Nation	Player
46	DF	ENG	Ezra Carrington
47	GK	NIR	Fraser Barnsley
48	DF	ENG	William Tamen
49	FW	WAL	Omari Benjamin
50	GK	ENG	George Pickford
52	GK	ENG	Douglass Lukjanciks
55	DF	ENG	George Finney
58	FW	NIR	Braiden Graham
60	DF	ENG	Rocco Lambert
61	MF	WAL	Luis Gardner
67	FW	NED	Martin Sherif

No.	Pos.	Nation	Player
68	FW	SCO	Ceiran Loney
70	GK	ENG	Zach Lee
77	DF	JAM	Odin Samuels-Smith
78	DF	ENG	Joshua van Schoor
81	MF	ENG	Harvey Foster
82	MF	GAM	Francis Gomez
85	MF	NIR	Jack Patterson
86	MF	ENG	Melvin Matos
90	DF	WAL	Aled Thomas
92	MF	ENG	Callum Bates

=== Out on loan ===
Note: Flags indicate national team as defined under FIFA eligibility rules; some limited exceptions apply. Players may hold more than one non-FIFA nationality.

No.	Pos.	Nation	Player
—	DF	ENG	Eli Campbell (at Milton Keynes Dons until 30 June 2027)
—	DF	ENG	Luca Davis (at Morecambe until 31 December 2026)

No.	Pos.	Nation	Player
—	FW	ENG	George Morgan (at Cannes until 30 June 2027)
—	FW	ENG	Joel Catesby (at Accrington Stanley until 30 June 2027)

=== Development squad ===
Note: Flags indicate national team as defined under FIFA eligibility rules; some limited exceptions apply. Players may hold more than one non-FIFA nationality.

No.	Pos.	Nation	Player
—	GK	ENG	Seve Patrick
—	GK	ENG	Teddy Wilcox
—	DF	ENG	Divine Madueke
—	DF	ENG	Harlow McEveley
—	DF	ENG	Harvey Billington
—	DF	SCO	John Dodds
—	DF	ENG	Lewis Evans
—	DF	ENG	Reuben Gokah
—	DF	ENG	Thomas McDermott
—	MF	ENG	Arthur Barratt
—	MF	WAL	Dafi-Tomos Pemberton

No.	Pos.	Nation	Player
—	MF	NIR	Freddie Murdock
—	MF	ENG	Harry Brookes
—	MF	CIV	Levi Okorie
—	MF	ENG	Lucas Moogan
—	MF	ENG	Malik Olayiwola
—	MF	ENG	Rodney Aduda
—	FW	ENG	Amari Moses
—	FW	POL	Jonathan Nsangou
—	FW	SCO	Kai Hutchison
—	FW	ENG	Ray Robert
—	FW	WAL	Shea Pita

== Player of the season ==
- Victor Anichebe (2006)
- John Irving (2007)
- John Irving (2008)
- Kieran Agard (2009)
- Shane Duffy (2010)
- Jose Baxter (2011)
- Adam Forshaw (2012)
- — (2013)
- Tyias Browning (2014)
- Brendan Galloway (2015)
- Joe Williams (2016)
- Jonjoe Kenny (2017)
- Morgan Feeney (2018)
- Nathan Broadhead (2019)
- Anthony Gordon (2020)
- Ryan Astley (2021)
- — (2022)
- — (2023)
- — (2024)
- — (2025)

== Academy staff ==
Position	Name
Operations Manager	(England) Dan Manning
Director of Academy	(England) Gareth Prosser
Head of Coaching	(Wales) Carl Darlington
Professional Development Coach	(England) Leighton Baines

Remaining academy staff:

- Lead Coaches: Paul Bennett, Tom Kearney, Paul Tait
- Coaching Team: Peter Cavanagh, Phil Jevons, Colin Littlejohns, John Miles, Kevin O'Brien, Joe Peterson, Scott Phelan, Tom Gardner, Andy Cowley, Ross Morrison
- Sports Science & Medicine: John McKeown, Peter Beirne, Lewis Charnock, Nick Coleman, Jack Dowling, Dan Carney, Josh Jeffery, Matthew Lowe, Leah McCready
- Recruitment: Sam Bailey, Michael Cribley, Paul Johnson, Darren Kearns, Ian Lavery, Ray Redmond, Nicola Woods.
- Education & Welfare: Chris Adamson, Phil McQuaid, Darren Murphy
- Operations: Daniel Manning, Sean Farrington, Vincent Fieldstead, Rob How, John King, Daniel Manning, Danny Webb, Sean McClure, Keith Loyden
- Analytics and Strategic Planning: Owen O’Connor

== Awards and honours ==
- Premier League 2:
  - Winners (2): 2016–17, 2018–19
- Premier League Cup:
  - Winners (1): 2019
- Lancashire Senior Cup:
  - Winners (7): 1894, 1897, 1910, 1935, 1940, 1964, 2016
- Liverpool Senior Cup:
  - Winners (41): 1884, 1886, 1887, 1890, 1891, 1892, 1894, 1895, 1896, 1898, 1899, 1900, 1904, 1906, 1908, 1911, 1914, 1919, 1921, 1922, 1923, 1924, 1926, 1928, 1938, 1940, 1945, 1953, 1954, 1956, 1957, 1959, 1960, 1961, 1983, 1996, 2003, 2005, 2007, 2016, 2025
  - Joint Winners (6): 1910, 1912, 1934, 1936, 1958, 1982
- SuperCupNI:
  - Winners (7): 1995 (Junior), 2002 (Junior), 2008 (Junior), 2009 (Junior), 2011 (Junior), 2013 (Junior), 2016 (Elite)
  - Runners-up (3): 1999 (Junior), 2004 (Junior), 2012 (Junior)
- U18 Premier League:
  - Winners (1): 2014
- Future Champions Tournament:
  - Runners-up (3): 2013
- Premier Academy League:
  - Winners (1): 2011
- FA Youth Cup:
  - Winners (3): 1965, 1984, 1998
  - Runners-up (4): 1961, 1977, 1983, 2002
- The Central League:
  - Winners (4): 1914, 1938, 1954, 1968
- CEE Cup
  - Winners (1): 2017
