= Eli Campbell =

English footballer (born 2004)

Personal information
- Full name: Elijah Xavier Campbell
- Date of birth: 2 August 2004 (age 22)
- Place of birth: Manchester, England
- Height: 1.85 m (6 ft 1 in)
- Position: Defender

Team information
- Current team: Milton Keynes Dons (on loan from Everton)
- Number: 20

Youth career
- 2017–2024: Everton

Senior career*
Years	Team	Apps	(Gls)
2024–	Everton	0	(0)
2024	→ Fleetwood Town (loan)	12	(0)
2024–2025	→ Ross County (loan)	28	(1)
2026	→ Port Vale (loan)	16	(0)
2026–	→ Milton Keynes Dons (loan)	6	(0)

International career
2021–2022	England U18	3	(0)
2024	England U20	4	(0)
- * Club domestic league appearances and goals as of 19:12, 4 November 2026 (UTC)

Elijah Xavier Campbell (born 2 August 2004) is an English professional footballer who plays as a defender for EFL League One club Milton Keynes Dons, on loan from Premier League club Everton.

Campbell was capped by England up to under-20 level. A former Manchester City season-ticket holder as a child, he turned professional at Everton in June 2022. He spent the second half of the 2023–24 season on loan at Fleetwood Town, the 2024–25 campaign on loan with Scottish Premiership club Ross County, and the second half of the 2025–26 season on loan at Port Vale. He joined Milton Keynes Dons on a season-long loan in September 2026.

== Early life ==
Campbell was born in Manchester. He grew up in Wythenshawe and attended football matches from the age of three, becoming a season-ticket holder at Manchester City.

== Club career ==
Campbell joined the academy at Everton in 2017 and established himself in the under-18 team at the age of sixteen, later captaining the side. He was highly rated by academy manager David Unsworth despite suffering injury problems at age 16. He signed his first professional contract at Goodison Park in June 2022, having been described as a "talented young player" by director of football Kevin Thelwell.

On 1 February 2024, he joined Fleetwood Town of League One on loan until the end of the 2023–24 season. He made his debut for Fleetwood two days later, in a 3–0 win over Port Vale at Highbury Stadium. He was knocked unconscious after receiving an elbow to the face at Stevenage on 9 March. He featured a total of 12 times for Charlie Adam's Cod Army.

Campbell featured for Sean Dyche's first team in pre-season friendlies at Sligo Rovers, Salford City, Coventry City and Preston North End. On 29 August 2024, he joined Scottish Premiership side Ross County on loan until the end of the 2024–25 season. On 19 October, he was sent off for what the BBC reported as being "two reckless and needless challenges inside the opening 31 minutes" of a 3–0 defeat at St Johnstone. He was singled out for praise by manager Don Cowie the following month after the Staggies picked up two consecutive clean sheets. On 14 December, he scored his first goal in senior football with a header during a 3–1 defeat at Hibernian. He played in both legs of the play-off final defeat to Livingston that saw Ross County relegated to the Championship. He said that relegation was difficult to experience, but that he was a better player because of his time at Victoria Park. He signed a new two-year contract with Everton in July 2025.

Campbell was linked with a loan move to St Mirren in July 2025. He was called up to the Everton first-team by manager David Moyes following injury concerns to Jarrad Branthwaite in November. On 10 January 2026, he made his senior debut at the Hill Dickinson Stadium as a substitute in extra time in an FA Cup tie with Sunderland. This earned him a place on the Finch Farm graduates board, the first name to be placed on the board by Paul Tait since Harrison Armstrong and Roman Dixon in 2024. On 1 February, Campbell returned to League One on loan at Port Vale until the end of the 2025–26 season. Manager Jon Brady said that he would "give us another defensive option going into a busy period of important games" as the club were 10 points adrift at the bottom of the division. Campbell made 13 league starts for the Vale, who were relegated in 22nd place.

On 1 September 2026, Campbell returned to League One on loan with Milton Keynes Dons for the 2026–27 season.

== International career ==
After representing his country at under-18 level, Campbell earned his first call-up to the England U20 side in October 2024. He went on to make his under-20 debut as a substitute during a 2–1 win over Italy.

== Style of play ==
Campbell can play centre-back or left-back; he reads the game well and is strong in aerial duels.

== Career statistics ==
As of match played 31 October 2026

Appearances and goals by club, season and competition
Club	Season	League			National cup (Note: Includes FA Cup, Scottish Cup)		League cup (Note: Includes EFL Cup)		Other		Total	
Club	Season	Division	Apps	Goals	Apps	Goals	Apps	Goals	Apps	Goals	Apps	Goals
Everton	2023–24	Premier League	0	0	0	0	0	0	—		0	0
Everton	2024–25	Premier League	0	0	0	0	0	0	—		0	0
Everton	2025–26	Premier League	0	0	1	0	0	0	—		1	0
Everton	2026–27	Premier League	0	0	0	0	0	0	—		0	0
Everton	Total		0	0	1	0	0	0	0	0	1	0
Everton U23	2021–22	—			—		—		3 (Note: Appearance(s) in the EFL Trophy)	0	3	0
Everton U23	2022–23	—			—		—		3	0	3	0
Everton U23	2023–24	—			—		—		3	0	3	0
Everton U23	2024–25	—			—		—		1	0	1	0
Everton U23	2025–26	—			—		—		2	0	2	0
Everton U23	Total		—		—		—		12	0	12	0
Fleetwood Town (loan)	2023–24	League One	12	0	—		—		—		12	0
Ross County (loan)	2024–25	Scottish Premiership	28	1	1	0	—		2 (Note: Appearances in the Scottish Premiership play-offs)	0	31	1
Port Vale (loan)	2025–26	League One	16	0	3	0	—		1	0	20	0
Milton Keynes Dons (loan)	2026–27	League One	6	0	0	0	—		2	1	8	1
Career total			62	1	5	0	0	0	17	1	84	2
