= 2026–27 Stockport County F.C. season =

145th season in existence of Stockport County FC

Stockport County
2026–27 season
- Owner: Mark Stott
- Chairman: Mark Stott
- Head coach: Jimmy McNulty
- Stadium: Edgeley Park

The 2026–27 season is the 145th season in the history of Stockport County Football Club and their third consecutive season being in League One. In addition to the domestic league, the club would also participate in the FA Cup, the EFL Cup, and the EFL Trophy.

== Managerial changes ==
Prior to the season starting Dave Challinor mutually parted ways with the club as manager and was later replaced by former player Jimmy McNulty on a three-year contract - having guided Rochdale to promotion.

== Transfers and contracts ==
=== In ===
Date	Pos.	Player	From	Fee	Ref.
15 June 2026 (Note: The transfer was announced on 27 May, and would become official on June 15 once the transfer window reopened)	LB	(England) Owen Dodgson	(England) Burnley		
15 June 2026 (Note: The transfer was announced on 8 June, and would become official on June 15 once the transfer window opened.)	RW	(England) Ryan Glover	(England) Barnet	Undisclosed	
1 July 2026 (Note: The transfer was announced on 23 June, and would become official on July 1 once Bailey's contract at Manchester United expired.)	CAM	(England) James Bailey	(England) Manchester United	Free	
1 July 2026 (Note: The transfer was announced on 12 June, and would become official on July 1 once Gospel-Eze's contract at Everton expired.)	GK	(Nigeria) Goodness Gospel-Eze	(England) Everton	Free	
1 July 2026 (Note: The transfer was announced on 9 June, and would become official on July 1 once Gordon's contract at Rochdale expired.)	CB	(England) Kyron Gordon	(England) Rochdale	Free	
1 July 2026 (Note: The transfer was announced on 30 June, and would become official on July 1 once O'Connell's contract at Barnsley expired.)	CB	(Republic of Ireland) Eoghan O'Connell	(England) Barnsley	Free	
7 July 2026	CAM	(England) Jason Adigun	(England) Chelmsford City	Undisclosed	
16 July 2026	CAM	(England) Harry Wood	(Republic of Ireland) Shelbourne	Undisclosed	
27 July 2026	CM	(England) Ben Osborn	(England) Derby County	Free	
31 July 2026	GK	(England) Luca Ashby-Hammond	(England) Plymouth Argyle	Free	
5 August 2026	CF	(France) Mikael Mandron	(Scotland) St Mirren	Free	
11 August 2026	CB	(England) Tom Wilson-Brown	(England) Leicester City	Undisclosed	
17 August 2026	RW	(England) Ethan Ennis	(England) Manchester United	Undisclosed	
28 August 2026	CB	(England) Mamadou Jobe	(England) Cambridge United	Undisclosed	

=== Loaned in ===
Date	Pos.	Player	From	Date until	Ref.
1 July 2026	GK	(England) Oliver Whatmuff	(England) Manchester City	End of season	

=== Loaned out ===
Date	Pos.	Player	To	Loaned until	Ref.
15 July 2026	GK	(Jamaica) Corey Addai	(England) Burton Albion	End of Season	
17 July 2026	LW	(Montserrat) Arian Allen	(England) FC Halifax Town	18 September 2026 (Note: On 18 September, Allen was recalled from his initial season-long loan at FC Halifax Town.)	
28 July 2026	GK	(Nigeria) Goodness Gospel-Eze	(England) Bamber Bridge	End of Season	
11 August 2026	LB	(England) Owen Dodgson	(England) Mansfield Town	End of Season	
27 August 2026	LW	(Jamaica) Malik Mothersille	(England) Wycombe Wanderers	End of Season	
28 August 2026	CM	(England) Owen Moxon	(England) Cambridge United	End of Season	
16 September 2026	CAM	(England) James Bailey	(England) Scunthorpe United	19 October 2026 (Note: On 19 October, Bailey was recalled from initial half-season loan at Scunthorpe United.)	
19 September 2026	LW	(Montserrat) Arian Allen	(England) Barrow	End of Season	
28 October 2026	CM	(Northern Ireland) Callum Camps	(England) Carlisle United	10 January 2027	
5 November 2026	LB	(England) Ryan Rydel	(England) Forest Green Rovers	3 January 2027	

=== Out ===
Date	Pos.	Player	To	Fee	Ref.
5 July 2026	CB	(Republic of Ireland) Christy Grogan	(Northern Ireland) Derry City	Undisclosed	
21 July 2026	CB	(England) Joseph Olowu	(England) Leyton Orient	Undisclosed	
28 July 2026	RW	(England) Jayden Fevrier	(England) Blackburn Rovers	£500,000	

=== Released / Out of Contract ===
Date	Pos.	Player	Subsequent club	Joined date	Ref.
30 June 2026	CAM	(England) Odin Bailey	(England) Portsmouth	1 July 2026	
30 June 2026	CB	(England) Callum Connolly	(England) Bradford City	1 July 2026	
30 June 2026	RB	(Germany) Jid Okeke	(Germany) Waldhof Mannheim	1 July 2026	
30 June 2026	CB	(Wales) Rhys Watson	(Wales) Connah's Quay Nomads	31 July 2026	
30 June 2026	GK	(England) Ben Hinchliffe			
30 June 2026	GK	(Scotland) Max Metcalfe	(England) Solihull Moors	8 August 2026	
31 August 2026	CB	(Finland) Arttu Hoskonen			

=== New Contract ===
Date	Pos.	Player	Contract expiry	Ref.
1 July 2026 (Note: The contract was announced on 12 June, and would officially come into effect on July 1.)	CF	(England) Joe Astles	30 June 2029 (Note: First professional contract)	
1 July 2026	CB	(England) Dan Marshall	30 June 2028	
7 July 2026	CM	(Northern Ireland) Oliver Norwood	30 June 2028	
29 July 2026	CB	(England) Ethan Pye	30 June 2029 (Note: Option of an additional year)	
11 September 2026	RW	(Jamaica) Che Gardner	30 June 2028	
23 September 2026	CF	(England) Richard Ilara	30 June 2029	

== Pre-season and friendlies ==
On 27 May, Stockport announced their first pre-season friendly against Preston North End to mark Ben Hinchliffe's testimonial. A six-day training camp in San Pedro del Pinatar was confirmed, with a fixture against Bristol City. On 18 June, a trip to face Oldham Athletic was added.

Win Draw Loss Fixtures

17 July 2026 Friendly	Stockport County	2–0	Bristol City	San Pedro del Pinatar, Spain
11:30 CEST	Sidibeh 22'; Fevrier 83'	Report		Stadium: Pinatar Arena

28 July 2026 Friendly	Oldham Athletic	0–1	Stockport County	Oldham
19:00 BST	Fondop (red card) 75'	Report	Mothersille 61'	Stadium: Boundary Park; Attendance: 2,326 (768 away)

1 August 2026 Friendly	Stockport County	1–0	Preston North End	Edgeley, Stockport
15:00 BST	Diamond 69'	Report		Stadium: Edgeley Park; Attendance: 5303 (692 away)

== Competitions ==
=== League One ===
==== League table ====
Pos	Team	Pld	W	D	L	GF	GA	GD	Pts	Promotion, qualification or relegation
1	Stockport County	16	10	2	4	32	15	+17	32	Promotion to EFL Championship
2	Huddersfield Town	15	8	5	2	28	13	+15	29	Promotion to EFL Championship
3	Oxford United	14	8	5	1	26	14	+12	29	Qualification for League One play-offs
4	Luton Town	15	8	3	4	29	22	+7	27	Qualification for League One play-offs
5	Sheffield Wednesday	15	7	5	3	27	15	+12	26	Qualification for League One play-offs

Updated to match(es) played on 21 November 2026. Source: EFL Official Website
Rules for classification: 1) Points; 2) Goal difference; 3) Number of goals scored; 4) Head-to-head results; 5) Wins; 6) Away goals; 7) Penalty points (sec 9.5); 8) 12-point sending off offences

==== Results summary ====
Overall								Home						Away					
Pld	W	D	L	GF	GA	GD	Pts	W	D	L	GF	GA	GD	W	D	L	GF	GA	GD
16	10	2	4	32	15	+17	32	6	0	2	19	10	+9	4	2	2	13	5	+8

Last updated: 21 November 2026.
Source: Soccerway

==== Results by round ====
Round	1	2	3	4	5	6	7	8	10	11	12	13	9^{1}	14	15	16	17	18	19	20	21	22	23	24	25	26	27	28	29	30	31	32
Ground	A	H	H	A	A	H	A	H	H	H	A	A	A	H	H	A	H	A	A	H	A	H	H	A	A	H	H	A	A	H	H	A
Result	W	L	W	L	W	L	D	W	W	W	W	D	L	W	W	W																
Position	2	9	4	9	3	8	9	3	3	2	1	2	2	2	2	1																
Points	3	3	6	6	9	9	10	13	16	19	22	23	23	26	29	32																

Source: EFL
A = Away; H = Home; W = Win; D = Draw; L = Loss; P = Postponed
Notes:
- ^{1} Matchday 9 (vs. Oxford United) was postponed due to international call-ups.

==== Matches ====
On 25 June, the League One fixtures were revealed.

Win Draw Loss Fixtures

15 August 2026 1	Plymouth Argyle	1–3	Stockport County	Plymouth
15:00 BST	Pleguezuelo (yellow card) 74'; Amaechi 79'; Pepple (yellow card) 90+4'	Report	Diamond 13'; Wootton 26'; Glover 49'	Stadium: Home Park; Attendance: 16,244 (887 away); Referee: David Rock

22 August 2026 2	Stockport County	1–2	Blackpool	Edgeley
15:00 BST	Glover (yellow card) 34'; Adigun (yellow card) 73'; Mandron 90+5'	Report	Bloxham 22'; Bowler 40'; Munroe (yellow card) 78'	Stadium: Edgeley Park; Attendance: 9,991 (1,154 away); Referee: Carl Brook

29 August 2026 3	Stockport County	5–1	Wycombe Wanderers	Edgeley
15:00 BST	Wood 16', 23'; Wootton 56'; Diamond 61'; Mandron 89'	Report	Woodrow 44'	Stadium: Edgeley Park; Attendance: 8,774; Referee: Edward Duckworth

2 September 2026 4	Luton Town	2–0	Stockport County	Luton
19:45 BST	Wells 50'; Gore (yellow card) 56'; Marshall 76'	Report	Norwood (yellow card) 68'	Stadium: Kenilworth Road; Attendance: 10,013; Referee: Craig Hicks
Note: Fixture was initially scheduled for 1 September, but was moved back 24 hours to accommodate other fixture changes.

5 September 2026 5	Wigan Athletic	0–4	Stockport County	Wigan
12:30 BST	Barrett (yellow card) 27'; Carragher (yellow card) 31'	Report	Wootton 10'; Wood 19'; Diamond 21'; Gordon (yellow card) 35'; Glover 90'	Stadium: Brick Community Stadium; Referee: Thomas Parsons
Note: Fixture was initially scheduled for a 15:00 kick-off, but was brought forward for live Sky Sports.

12 September 2026 6	Stockport County	3–4	Leicester City	Edgeley
15:00 BST	Diamond 22'; Pye (yellow card) 36'; Norwood 57'; Wootton 61'; Gordon (yellow card) 63'	Report	Cullen 11'; Riis 30', 48'; Page (yellow card) 50'; Lundstram 52'	Stadium: Edgeley Park; Attendance: 10,411 (1,160 away); Referee: Thomas Kirk

19 September 2026 7	Sheffield Wednesday	0–0	Stockport County	Owlerton
15:00 BST	James (yellow card) 27'; Cooper (yellow card) 68'; Valery (yellow card) 90+3'	Report	O'Connell (yellow card) 58'	Stadium: Hillsborough; Attendance: 32,290 (2,406 away); Referee: Ben Toner

26 September 2026 8	Stockport County	1–0	Peterborough United	Edgeley
15:00 BST	Wootton 51'; Adigun (yellow card) 90+1'	Report	Johnston (yellow card) 46'; Mendonca (yellow card) 87'; Mills (yellow card) 89'	Stadium: Edgeley Park; Attendance: 9,637 (401 away); Referee: Ross Martin

10 October 2026 10	Stockport County	3–1	Barnsley	Edgeley
15:00 BST	Wootton 61', 73'; Wood (yellow card) 63'; Mandron 90'		Kelly 13'; McGeehan (yellow card) 25'; Shepherd (yellow card) 83'	Stadium: Edgeley Park; Referee: Martin Coy

17 October 2026 11	Stockport County	1–0	Bromley	Edgeley
15:00 BST	Wootton 19'; Norwood (yellow card) 27'	Report	Conteh (yellow card) 50'; Smith (yellow card) 76'	Stadium: Edgeley Park; Referee: Seb Stockbridge

20 October 2026 12	Doncaster Rovers	0–2	Stockport County	Doncaster
19:45 BST	Bailey (yellow card) 21'; Robinson (yellow card) 90+1'	Report	Diamond (yellow card) 49'; Jobe 53'; Norwood (penalty missed) 58'; Wootton 59'	Stadium: Club Doncaster Sports Village; Referee: Alan Young

24 October 2026 13	Notts County	1–1	Stockport County	Nottingham
15:00 BST	Robertson 11'; Tsaroulla (yellow card) 15'; Smyth (yellow card) 71'; Ness (yellow card) 80'; McDonald (yellow card) 82'	Report	Osborn (yellow card) 56'; Whatmuff (yellow card) 72'; Sidibeh 81'	Stadium: Meadow Lane; Attendance: 12,214; Referee: Darren Drysdale

27 October 2026 9	Oxford United	1–0	Stockport County	Littlemore
19:45 BST	Harris 35'; Currie (yellow card) 51'	Report	Pye (yellow card) 85'	Stadium: The Kassam Stadium; Attendance: 9,602; Referee: Stephen Parkinson
Note: Fixture was initially scheduled for 3 October, but was rearranged due to international call-ups.

31 October 2026 14	Stockport County	2–1	AFC Wimbledon	Edgeley
15:00 GMT	O'Connell (yellow card) 60'; Diamond 64'; Ennis 74'	Report	Stockley 47', (yellow card) 75'	Stadium: Edgeley Park; Attendance: 8,737; Referee: Dean Whitestone

14 November 2026 15	Stockport County	3–1	Reading	Edgeley
15:00 GMT	Wootton 6'; Ennis 32'; Diamond 52'; Wood (yellow card) 59'; Gordon (yellow card) 76'	Report	Marriott 11'; Roberts (yellow card) 23'; Lisbie (yellow card) 45+4'; Fraser (yellow card) 90+4'	Stadium: Edgeley Park; Attendance: 9,778 (689 away); Referee: Bobby Madley

21 November 2026 16	Cambridge United	0–3	Stockport County	Cambridge
15:00 GMT	Bradshaw (yellow card) 49'; Ball (yellow card) 71'; Bennett (yellow card) 77'	Report	Pye (yellow card) 21'; Norwood 49'; Ennis 71'; Ahadme 80' (o.g.)	Stadium: Cledara Abbey Stadium; Attendance: 7,602; Referee: Simon Mather

28 November 2026 17	Stockport County	v	Leyton Orient	Edgeley
15:00 GMT				Stadium: Edgeley Park

1 December 2026 18	Mansfield Town	v	Stockport County	Mansfield
19:45 GMT				Stadium: One Call Stadium

12 December 2026 19	Stevenage	v	Stockport County	Stevenage
12:30 GMT				Stadium: Stevenage FC Stadium
Note: Fixture was initially scheduled for a 15:00 kick-off, but was brought forward for live Sky Sports broadcasting.

19 December 2026 20	Stockport County	v	Milton Keynes Dons	Edgeley
15:00 GMT				Stadium: Edgeley Park

26 December 2026 21	Bradford City	v	Stockport County	Bradford
15:00 GMT				Stadium: Mbanq Valley Parade

29 December 2026 22	Stockport County	v	Huddersfield Town	Edgeley
19:45 GMT				Stadium: Edgeley Park

2 January 2027 23	Stockport County	v	Burton Albion	Edgeley
15:00 GMT				Stadium: Edgeley Park
Note: Fixture was initially scheduled for 1 January, but was rescheduled to assist with player recovery over the festive period.

9 January 2027 24	Milton Keynes Dons	v	Stockport County	Denbigh
15:00 GMT				Stadium: Stadium MK

16 January 2027 25	Bromley	v	Stockport County	Bromley
12:30 GMT				Stadium: Hayes Lane
Note: Fixture was initially scheduled for a 15:00 kick-off, but was brought forward for live Sky Sports broadcasting.

19 January 2027 26	Stockport County	v	Doncaster Rovers	Edgeley
19:45 GMT				Stadium: Edgeley Park

23 January 2027 27	Stockport County	v	Notts County	Edgeley
15:00 GMT				Stadium: Edgeley Park

30 January 2027 28	AFC Wimbledon	v	Stockport County	Wimbledon
15:00 GMT				Stadium: Cherry Red Records Stadium

6 February 2027 29	Wycombe Wanderers	v	Stockport County	High Wycombe
15:00 GMT				Stadium: Adams Park

9 February 2027 30	Stockport County	v	Luton Town	Edgeley
19:45 GMT				Stadium: Edgeley Park

13 February 2027 31	Stockport County	v	Wigan Athletic	Edgeley
15:00 GMT				Stadium: Edgeley Park

20 February 2027 32	Leicester City	v	Stockport County	Leicester
12:30 GMT				Stadium: King Power Stadium
Note: Fixture was initially scheduled for a 15:00 kick-off, but was brought forward for live Sky Sports broadcasting.

=== FA Cup ===
Stockport were drawn away to Cray Wanderers in the first round and to Reading in the second round.

Win Draw Loss Fixtures

8 November 2026 First round	Cray Wanderers	2–3 (a.e.t.)	Stockport County	Chislehurst
14:15 GMT	McLeod 21'; Hernandez 36', (yellow card) 69'	Report	Ashby-Hammond (red card) 31'; O'Connell (yellow card) 50'; Pye (yellow card) 51'; Wootton 81'; Mandron 90+1'; Fiorini 101' (pen.)	Stadium: Flamingo Park; Attendance: 2,372 (448 away); Referee: Lewis Sandoe
Note: Fixture was selected for live TNT Sports broadcasting.

5 December 2026 Second round	Reading	v	Stockport County	Reading
15:00 GMT				Stadium: Select Car Leasing Stadium

=== EFL Cup ===
Stockport were drawn at home to Doncaster Rovers in the first round.

Win Draw Loss Fixtures

8 August 2026 First round	Stockport County	1–1 (4–5 p)	Doncaster Rovers	Edgeley
15:00 BST	Wootton 51'	Report	May 50'	Stadium: Edgeley Park; Referee: Leigh Doughty
	Penalties
	Osborn (penalty missed); Andrésson (penalty scored); Wootton (penalty scored); Fiorini (penalty scored); Adigun (penalty scored); O'Connell (penalty missed)		(penalty scored) May; (penalty scored) Broadbent; (penalty scored) Bailey; (penalty missed) Clifton; (penalty scored) Sterry; (penalty scored) Adelakun

=== EFL Trophy ===
==== Group stage ====
Stockport were drawn against Tranmere Rovers, Shrewsbury Town and Everton U21 into Northern Group E.

Pos	Div	Team	Pld	W	PW	PL	L	GF	GA	GD	Pts	Qualification
1	L1	Stockport County (A)	3	2	1	0	0	8	3	+5	8	Advance to Round 2
2	L2	Tranmere Rovers (A)	2	1	0	1	0	1	0	+1	4	Advance to Round 2
3	L2	Shrewsbury Town (E)	3	1	0	0	2	2	4	−2	3	
4	ACA	Everton U21 (E)	2	0	0	0	2	4	8	−4	0	

Updated to match(es) played on 10 November 2026. Source: EFL
(A) Advances to a further round; (E) Eliminated

Win Draw Loss Fixtures

18 August 2026 Group stage	Stockport County	6–3	Everton U21	Edgeley
19:00 BST	Mothersille 11', 84', 90+3'; Camps 44'; Mandron 45+7'; Edun 79'	Report	Catesby 52'; Graham 54' (pen.), 77'; Patterson (yellow card) 71'; van Schoor (yellow card) 76'	Stadium: Edgeley Park; Attendance: 1,538 (73 away); Referee: Martin Woods

6 October 2026 Group stage	Shrewsbury Town	0–2	Stockport County	Shrewsbury
19:00 BST	Gray (yellow card) 90+5'	Report	Adigun 75'; Gardner 85'	Stadium: Croud Meadow; Attendance: 1,918; Referee: Richie Watkins

10 November 2026 Group stage	Stockport County	0–0 (4–3 p)	Tranmere Rovers	Edgeley
19:00 GMT	Ilara (yellow card) 65'	Report		Stadium: Edgeley Park; Attendance: 1,587 (225 away); Referee: Dale Baines
	Penalties
	Glover (penalty scored); Bailey (penalty scored); Huddleston (penalty scored); Gardner (penalty missed); Jobe (penalty scored)		Watson (penalty missed); Nevett (penalty scored); Mann (penalty missed); Brough (penalty scored); Veevers (penalty scored)

== Statistics ==
=== Appearances and goals ===
As of match played 21 November 2026

Players with no appearances are not included on the list; italics indicate a loaned in player

No.	Pos	Nat	Player	Total		League One		FA Cup		EFL Cup		EFL Trophy	
No.	Pos	Nat	Player	Apps	Goals	Apps	Goals	Apps	Goals	Apps	Goals	Apps	Goals
1	GK	(England) ENG	Oliver Whatmuff	17	0	15+0	0	0+1	0	1+0	0	0+0	0
2	DF	(England) ENG	Josh Dacres-Cogley	13	0	2+8	0	1+0	0	0+0	0	2+0	0
4	MF	(England) ENG	Lewis Bate	17	0	15+0	0	0+0	0	1+0	0	0+1	0
5	DF	(England) ENG	Ethan Pye	17	0	15+0	0	0+1	0	1+0	0	0+0	0
6	DF	(Republic of Ireland) IRL	Eoghan O'Connell	18	0	16+0	0	1+0	0	1+0	0	0+0	0
7	FW	(England) ENG	Jack Diamond	18	6	15+1	6	0+1	0	1+0	0	0+0	0
8	MF	(Northern Ireland) NIR	Callum Camps	2	1	0+0	0	0+0	0	0+0	0	2+0	1
9	FW	(Iceland) ISL	Benoný Breki Andrésson	11	0	2+7	0	1+0	0	0+1	0	0+0	0
10	MF	(Northern Ireland) NIR	Oliver Norwood	18	2	16+0	2	0+0	0	1+0	0	1+0	0
11	FW	(Jamaica) JAM	Malik Mothersille	1	3	0+0	0	0+0	0	0+0	0	1+0	3
12	DF	(England) ENG	Tom Wilson-Brown	3	0	0+0	0	1+0	0	0+0	0	2+0	0
14	DF	(England) ENG	Tayo Edun	7	1	1+2	0	1+0	0	1+0	0	1+1	1
15	FW	(England) ENG	Ryan Glover	18	2	13+3	2	0+0	0	1+0	0	0+1	0
16	MF	(England) ENG	Harry Wood	18	3	14+2	3	1+0	0	1+0	0	0+0	0
17	DF	(England) ENG	Ryan Rydel	4	0	0+1	0	0+0	0	0+1	0	1+1	0
18	MF	(Scotland) SCO	Lewis Fiorini	17	1	1+12	0	1+0	1	0+1	0	2+0	0
19	FW	(England) ENG	Kyle Wootton	18	12	16+0	10	0+1	1	1+0	1	0+0	0
20	MF	(England) ENG	Jason Adigun	17	1	1+12	0	1+0	0	0+1	0	2+0	1
21	MF	(England) ENG	Owen Moxon	1	0	0+0	0	0+0	0	0+0	0	1+0	0
22	FW	(France) FRA	Mikael Mandron	15	5	0+12	3	1+0	1	0+0	0	2+0	1
23	MF	(England) ENG	Ben Osborn	18	0	13+3	0	0+0	0	0+1	0	1+0	0
24	DF	(England) ENG	Kyron Gordon	13	0	11+0	0	0+0	0	1+0	0	1+0	0
25	DF	(England) ENG	Mamadou Jobe	14	1	6+6	1	0+0	0	0+0	0	1+1	0
26	GK	(England) ENG	Luca Ashby-Hammond	5	0	1+0	0	1+0	0	0+0	0	3+0	0
28	FW	(Jamaica) JAM	Che Gardner	5	1	0+1	0	1+0	0	0+0	0	2+1	1
29	FW	(The Gambia) GAM	Adama Sidibeh	2	1	0+2	1	0+0	0	0+0	0	0+0	0
30	FW	(England) ENG	Ethan Ennis	12	3	3+7	3	0+0	0	0+0	0	2+0	0
31	DF	(England) ENG	Jay Mingi	1	0	0+0	0	0+1	0	0+0	0	0+0	0
41	FW	(England) ENG	Bruno Cina	2	0	0+0	0	0+0	0	0+0	0	1+1	0
42	MF	(England) ENG	James Bailey	3	0	0+0	0	0+0	0	0+0	0	1+2	0
55	FW	(England) ENG	Joe Astles	3	0	0+0	0	0+0	0	0+0	0	1+2	0
61	MF	(England) ENG	Jacob Maher	1	0	0+0	0	0+0	0	0+0	0	0+1	0
63	DF	(England) ENG	Dan Marshall	1	0	0+0	0	0+0	0	0+0	0	1+0	0
75	DF	(England) ENG	Oliver Huddleston	1	0	0+0	0	0+0	0	0+0	0	0+1	0
76	FW	(England) ENG	Richard Ilara	4	0	0+0	0	0+1	0	0+0	0	1+2	0
Players who featured but departed the club permanently during the season:
25	DF	(Finland) FIN	Arttu Hoskonen	1	0	0	0	0	0	0	0	1	0

== Awards ==
=== Player Awards ===
==== EFL League One Goal of the Month ====
Month	Player	Opposition	Result	Ref.
August	(France) Mikael Mandron	v. Wycombe Wanderers	Nominated	

==== PFA League One Fans' Player of the Month ====
Month	Player	Result	Ref.
September	(England) Jack Diamond	Nominated	
September	(England) Kyle Wootton	Nominated	

=== Manager Awards ===
==== EFL League One Manager of the Month ====
Month	Manager	Result	Ref.
August	(Scotland) Jimmy McNulty	Nominated	
