= Brad Hills =

English footballer (born 2004)

Personal information
- Full name: Bradley Hills
- Date of birth: 10 March 2004 (age 22)
- Place of birth: Norwich, England
- Height: 1.88 m (6 ft 2 in)
- Position: Defender

Team information
- Current team: Stockport County
- Number: 33

Youth career
- –2023: Norwich City

Senior career*
Years	Team	Apps	(Gls)
2023–2025	Norwich City	3	(0)
2023–2024	→ Accrington Stanley (loan)	41	(3)
2025	→ Stockport County (loan)	16	(1)
2025–	Stockport County	28	(1)

International career^{‡}
2024	England U20	4	(0)
- * Club domestic league appearances and goals as of 14:46, 21 March 2026 (UTC) ‡ National team caps and goals as of 11:58, 26 October 2024 (UTC)

Bradley Hills (born 10 March 2004) an English professional footballer who plays as a centre-back for Stockport County.

== Club career ==
Born in Norwich, Hills began his career with Norwich City, signing a new three-year contract in November 2022. He moved on loan to Accrington Stanley in July 2023. He was "ever present" at the start of the season, scoring his first senior goal on 25 October 2023, and having an "impressive" start to the season. At the end of the campaign he was voted Player of the Year by the club's supporters.

=== Stockport County ===
In February 2025 he moved on loan to Stockport County. In August 2025, he returned to Stockport on a permanent five-year contract. He suffered an ACL injury in March 2026, ruling him out for the "foreseeable future". He was named as the club's Young Player of the Season for the 2025–26 season.

== International career ==
On 7 June 2024, Hills made his England U20 debut during a 2–1 win over Sweden at Stadion ŠRC Sesvete.

== Career statistics ==
As of match played 21 March 2026

Appearances and goals by club, season and competition
Club	Season	League			FA Cup		League Cup		Other		Total	
Club	Season	Division	Apps	Goals	Apps	Goals	Apps	Goals	Apps	Goals	Apps	Goals
Norwich City	2023–24	Championship	0	0	0	0	0	0	0	0	0	0
Norwich City	2024–25	Championship	3	0	1	0	1	0	—		5	0
Norwich City	Total		3	0	1	0	1	0	0	0	5	0
Accrington Stanley (loan)	2023–24	League Two	41	3	1	0	1	0	5 (Note: Appearances in EFL Trophy)	0	48	3
Stockport County (loan)	2024–25	League One	16	1	0	0	0	0	2 (Note: Appearances in the EFL League One play-offs)	0	18	1
Stockport County	2025–26	League One	28	1	0	0	0	0	3	0	31	1
Stockport County	2026–27	League One	0	0	0	0	0	0	0	0	0	0
Stockport County	Total		28	1	0	0	0	0	3	0	31	1
Career total			88	5	2	0	2	0	10	0	102	5

== Honours ==
Individual

- Accrington Stanley Player of the Season: 2023–24
- Stockport County Young Player of the Season: 2025–26
