= Josh Stokes =

English footballer (born 2004)

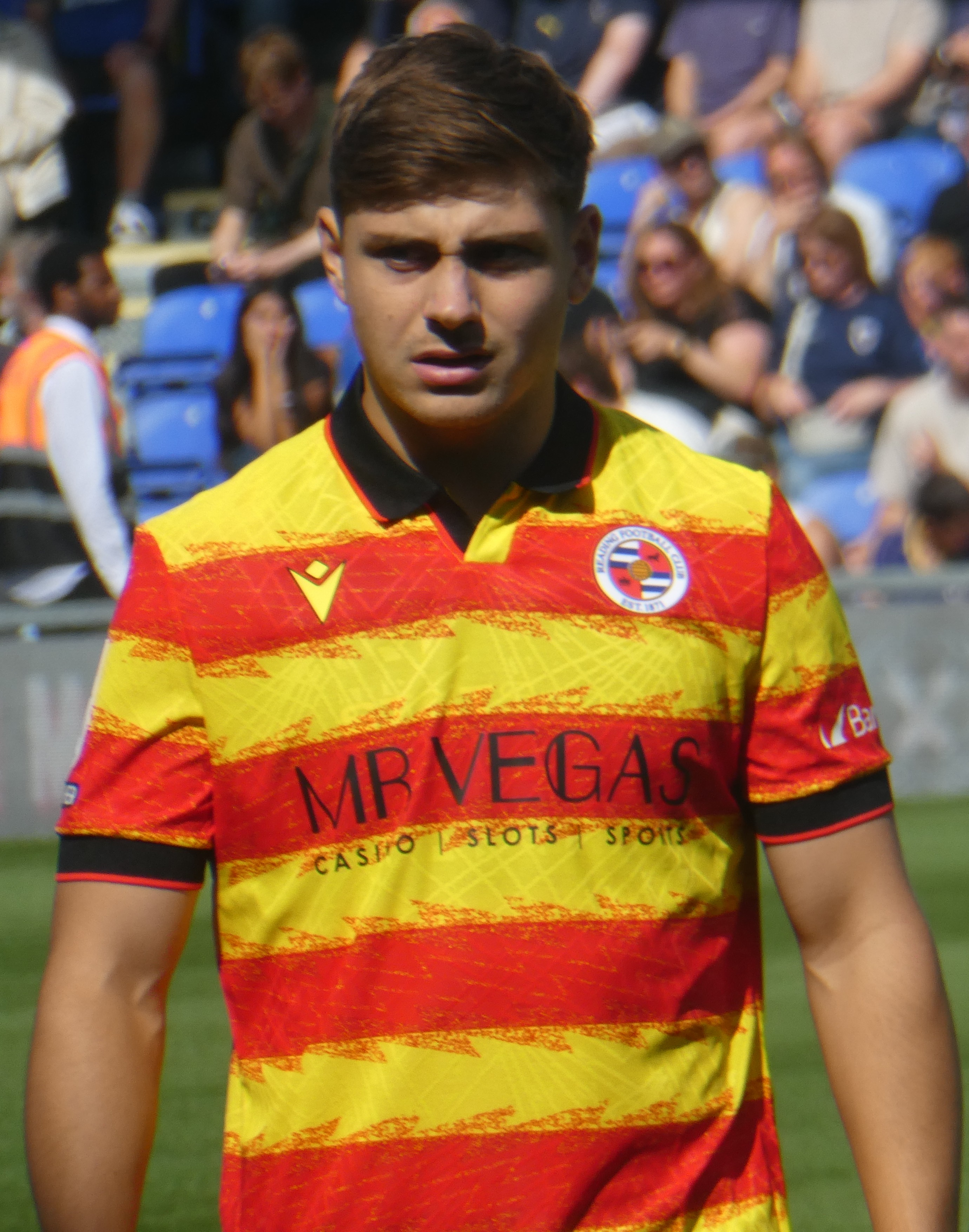
- Stokes playing for Reading in 2026

Personal information
- Full name: Joshua Dale Stokes
- Date of birth: 29 April 2004 (age 22)
- Place of birth: Shotley, England
- Height: 1.80 m (5 ft 11 in)
- Position: Attacking midfielder

Team information
- Current team: Reading (on loan from Bristol City)
- Number: 28

Youth career
- Ipswich Town
- –2021: AFC Sudbury

Senior career*
Years	Team	Apps	(Gls)
2021–2023	AFC Sudbury	64	(15)
2023–2024	Aldershot Town	26	(13)
2024–	Bristol City	0	(0)
2024	→ Aldershot Town (loan)	19	(2)
2024–2025	→ Cambridge United (loan)	32	(7)
2026	→ Stockport County (loan)	20	(4)
2026–	→ Reading (loan)	9	(0)
- * Club domestic league appearances and goals as of 1 November 2026 (UTC)

Joshua Dale Stokes (born 29 April 2004) is an English professional football player who plays as an attacking midfielder for EFL League One club Reading, on loan from EFL Championship club Bristol City.

== Club career ==
=== AFC Sudbury ===
Stokes played for the Ipswich Town Academy, but was released aged 16. Following this, he joined the AFC Sudbury academy, but soon became a regular part of the senior team, playing most matches of the 2021–22 season.

=== Aldershot Town ===
On 7 July 2023, National League club Aldershot Town signed Stokes on a two year professional contract from AFC Sudbury for an undisclosed fee. He made a positive impact for the club in the first half of the 2023–24 season, scoring 16 goals in 31 appearances across all appearances.

=== Bristol City ===
Despite interests from various clubs such as Norwich City, on 22 January 2024, EFL Championship club Bristol City completed the signing of Stokes on a three-and-a-half-year deal for an undisclosed fee, reported to be £250,000. Stokes was immediately loaned back to Aldershot Town for the remainder of the 2023–24 season.

Stokes made his debut for Bristol City during an EFL Cup match on 13 August 2024 against Coventry City, coming on as a 69th minute substitute for Nahki Wells.

==== Cambridge United (loan) ====
On 21 August 2024, Stokes signed for EFL League One club Cambridge United on loan until the end of the 2024–25 season.

==== Stockport County (loan) ====
Stokes signed for EFL League One club Stockport County on 6 January 2026 until the end of the season helping them reach the 2026 EFL League One play-off final against Bolton Wanderers where they lost 4-1 to Bolton Wanderers at Wembley Stadium on 24 May 2026 with Stokes playing 65 minutes where he was replaced by Benoný Breki Andrésson after they beat Stevenage 3-0 on aggregate winning 1-0 at the Lamex Stadium on 9 May 2026 and 2-0 at Edgeley Park on 13 May 2026.

==== Reading (loan) ====
Stokes signed for EFL League One club Reading on a season-long loan from Bristol City on 10 July 2026.

== Career statistics ==
As of match played 2 May 2026

Appearances and goals by club, season and competition
Club	Season	League			FA Cup		League Cup		Other		Total	
Club	Season	Division	Apps	Goals	Apps	Goals	Apps	Goals	Apps	Goals	Apps	Goals
AFC Sudbury	2021–22	Isthmian League North	30	4	1	0	—		1 (Note: Appearance in the Alan Turvey Trophy)	0	32	4
AFC Sudbury	2022–23	Isthmian League North	34	11	6	3	—		3 (Note: One appearance in the FA Trophy, two in the Isthmian League North Division play-offs)	0	43	14
AFC Sudbury	Total		64	15	7	3	—		4	0	75	18
Aldershot Town	2023–24	National League	26	13	4	3	—		1 (Note: Appearance in the FA Trophy)	0	31	16
Bristol City	2023–24	Championship	0	0	0	0	0	0	—		0	0
Bristol City	2024–25	Championship	0	0	0	0	1	0	—		1	0
Bristol City	2025–26	Championship	0	0	0	0	1	0	—		1	0
Bristol City	Total		0	0	0	0	2	0	—		2	0
Aldershot Town (loan)	2023–24	National League	19	2	—		—		—		19	2
Cambridge United (loan)	2024–25	League One	32	7	0	0	0	0	2 (Note: Appearances in EFL Trophy)	1	34	8
Stockport County (loan)	2025–26	League One	20	4	—		—		3	2	10	3
Career total			161	41	11	6	2	0	10	3	184	50

== Honours ==
Stockport County

- EFL Trophy runner-up: 2025–26
