= 2025–26 Stockport County F.C. season =

144th season in existence of Stockport County FC

Stockport County
2025–26 season
- Owner: Mark Stott
- Chairman: Ken Knott
- Manager: Dave Challinor
- Stadium: Edgeley Park
- EFL League One: 3rd
- Play-offs: Runners-up
- FA Cup: Second round
- EFL Cup: Second round
- EFL Trophy: Runners-up
- Top goalscorer: League: Kyle Wootton (18); All: Kyle Wootton (20)
- Highest home attendance: 10,172 (vs. Bolton Wanderers, 3 August 2025)
- Lowest home attendance: 1,014 (vs. Wolverhampton Wanderers U21, 2 September 2025)
- Average home league attendance: 9,503
- Biggest win: 0–4 (vs. Port Vale, 10 February)
- Biggest defeat: 0–3 (vs. Luton Town, 8 November); 3–0 (vs. Peterborough United, 20 November); 3–0 (vs. Burton Albion, 24 February)
Home colours	Away colours

The 2025–26 season was the 144th season in the history of Stockport County Football Club and their second consecutive season in League One. In addition to the domestic league, the club also participated in the FA Cup, the EFL Cup, and the EFL Trophy.

== Transfers and contracts ==
=== In ===
Date	Pos.	Player	From	Fee	Ref.
1 July 2025 (Note: The transfer was announced on 19 June, and would become official on July 1 once his contract at Peterborough had ended)	LB	(England) Tayo Edun	(England) Peterborough United	Free	
1 July 2025 (Note: The transfer was announced on 29 May, and would become official on July 1 once his contract at Stoke had ended)	CB	(Republic of Ireland) Christy Grogan	(England) Stoke City	Free	
1 July 2025 (Note: The transfer was announced on 18 June, and would become official on July 1 once his contract at Doncaster had ended)	CB	(England) Joseph Olowu	(England) Doncaster Rovers	Free	
2 July 2025	LW	(Jamaica) Malik Mothersille	(England) Peterborough United	Undisclosed	
21 July 2025	CB	(Finland) Arttu Hoskonen	(Poland) Cracovia	Free	
2 August 2025	LB	(England) Danny Andrew	(England) Cambridge United	Free	
14 August 2025	CB	(England) Brad Hills	(England) Norwich City	Undisclosed	
18 November 2025	RB	(England) Jack Hunt	(England) Bristol Rovers	Free	
15 January 2026	RB	(England) Josh Dacres-Cogley	(England) Bolton Wanderers	Undisclosed	
27 January 2026	CF	(The Gambia) Adama Sidibeh	(Scotland) St Johnstone	Undisclosed	

=== Out ===
Date	Pos.	Player	To	Fee	Ref.
24 June 2025	CB	(England) Sam Hughes	(England) Peterborough United	Undisclosed	
2 July 2025	CF	(England) Tanto Olaofe	(England) Charlton Athletic	Undisclosed	
31 January 2026	CAM	(England) Ashton Mee	(England) Buxton	Undisclosed	

=== Loaned in ===
Date	Pos.	Player	From	Date until	Ref.
18 July 2025	RB	(Republic of Ireland) Corey O'Keeffe	(England) Barnsley	5 January 2026 (Note: On 5 January, O'Keeffe's season-long loan from Barnsley was terminated)	
30 July 2025	CF	(England) Nathan Lowe	(England) Stoke City	6 January 2026 (Note: On 6 January, Lowe's season-long loan from Stoke was terminated due to sustaining an injury)	
31 July 2025	LB	(England) Owen Dodgson	(England) Burnley	31 May 2026 (Note: Option to buy when loan deal ends)	
1 September 2025	CM	(England) Corey Edwards	(England) Rochdale	31 May 2026 (Note: On 6 January, Edwards' loan from Rochdale was extended until the end of the season)	
1 September 2025	CM	(England) Tyler Onyango	(England) Everton	31 May 2026	
1 September 2025	CM	(England) Ben Osborn	(England) Derby County	31 May 2026	
6 January 2026	CAM	(England) Josh Stokes	(England) Bristol City	31 May 2026	
23 January 2026	RB	(England) Roman Dixon	(England) Everton	31 May 2026	
28 January 2026	CF	(England) Tanto Olaofe	(England) Charlton Athletic	31 May 2026	
2 February 2026	LW	(England) Louie Barry	(England) Aston Villa	31 May 2026	

=== Loaned out ===
Date	Pos.	Player	To	Date until	Ref.
25 June 2025	LB	(England) Ryan Rydel	(England) Exeter City	31 May 2026	
16 August 2025	GK	(Republic of Ireland) Andrew Wogan	(England) Chester	29 August 2025 (Note: On 22 August, Wogan's loan at Chester was extended by an additional seven days)	
19 August 2025	GK	(Republic of Ireland) Cian O'Shea	(England) Avro	17 September 2025	
1 September 2025	RB	(England) Jay Mingi	(England) Crewe Alexandra	23 January 2026 (Note: On 23 January, Mingi was recalled from his season-long loan at Crewe Alexandra and subsequently joined Forest Green Rovers on loan)	
1 September 2025	RB	(Germany) Jid Okeke	(England) Walsall	5 January 2026 (Note: On 5 January, Okeke was recalled from his season-long loan at Walsall)	
5 December 2025	CB	(Republic of Ireland) Christy Grogan	(England) Aldershot Town	12 April 2026 (Note: On 12 April, Grogan was recalled from his half-season loan at Aldershot Town)	
20 January 2026	CM	(England) Owen Moxon	(England) Wigan Athletic	31 May 2026	
23 January 2026	RB	(England) Jay Mingi	(England) Forest Green Rovers	31 May 2026	
28 January 2026	RW	(England) Jayden Fevrier	(England) Charlton Athletic	31 May 2026	
2 February 2026	RB	(Germany) Jid Okeke	(England) Walsall	31 May 2026	
20 February 2026	GK	(Scotland) Max Metcalfe	(England) Oxford City	26 April 2026	

=== Released / Out of Contract ===
Date	Pos.	Player	Subsequent club	Join date	Ref.
30 June 2025	CM	(England) Will Collar	(England) Milton Keynes Dons	1 July 2025	
30 June 2025	CB	(England) Fraser Horsfall	(England) Blackpool	1 July 2025	
30 June 2025	CM	(England) Cody Johnson	(England) FC Halifax Town	1 July 2025	
30 June 2025	RB	(England) Kyle Knoyle	(England) Mansfield Town	1 July 2025	
30 June 2025	RB	(Wales) Macauley Southam-Hales	(England) Bristol Rovers	1 July 2025	
30 June 2025	LB	(The Gambia) Ibou Touray	(England) Bradford City	1 July 2025	
18 August 2025	CAM	(England) Nick Powell	(England) Bradford City	18 August 2025	
1 September 2025	LB	(England) Danny Andrew	(England) Exeter City	1 September 2025	
19 January 2026	RB	(England) Jack Hunt	(England) Wigan Athletic	2 February 2026	

=== New Contract ===
Date	Pos.	Player	Contract until	Ref.
23 July 2025	CB	(England) Nathaniel Mapengu	30 June 2027 (Note: First professional contract)	
29 August 2025	LW	(Montserrat) Arian Allen	30 June 2027 (Note: Option for an additional year)	
7 April 2026	SS	(England) Bruno Cina	30 June 2027	

== Pre-season and friendlies ==
On 23 May, Stockport County announced a six-day training camp in San Pedro del Pinatar which included a fixture against Bristol Rovers. A fortnight later, a home fixture against Hull City was confirmed. On 12 June, a trip to face Salford City was added.

Also confirmed was an XI side will face Spennymoor Town in a testimonial for Glen Taylor.

Win Draw Loss Fixtures

12 July 2025 Friendly	Stockport County	3–2	Bristol Rovers	San Pedro del Pinatar, Spain
11:30 CEST	Norwood 32'; Bate 50'; Gardner 89'	Report	Dewsbury 63'; Thomas 67'	Stadium: Pinatar Arena

19 July 2025 Glen Taylor testimonial	Spennymoor Town	3–0	Stockport County XI	Spennymoor
15:00 BST	Doherty 71'; Heaney 85'; Butler 88' (pen.)	Report		Stadium: The Brewery Field; Attendance: 757

25 July 2025 Friendly	Salford City	1-1	Stockport County	Kersal
19:30 BST	Ashley 82'	Report	Trialist A 53'	Stadium: Moor Lane

26 July 2025 Friendly	Stockport County	0–1	Hull City	Edgeley
15:00 BST		Report	Burstow 75'	Stadium: Edgeley Park; Attendance: 3,829 (921 away)

== Competitions ==
=== League One ===
==== League table ====
Pos	Team	Pld	W	D	L	GF	GA	GD	Pts	Promotion, qualification or relegation
1	Lincoln City (C, P)	46	31	10	5	89	41	+48	103	Promotion to EFL Championship
2	Cardiff City (P)	46	27	10	9	90	50	+40	91	Promotion to EFL Championship
3	Stockport County	46	22	11	13	71	58	+13	77	Qualification for League One play-offs
4	Bradford City	46	22	11	13	58	51	+7	77	Qualification for League One play-offs
5	Bolton Wanderers (O, P)	46	19	18	9	70	52	+18	75	Qualification for League One play-offs

Source: EFL Official Website
Rules for classification: 1) Points; 2) Goal difference; 3) Number of goals scored; 4) Head-to-head results; 5) Wins; 6) Away goals; 7) Penalty points (sec 9.5); 8) 12-point sending off offences
(C) Champions; (O) Play-off winners; (P) Promoted

==== Results summary ====
Overall								Home						Away					
Pld	W	D	L	GF	GA	GD	Pts	W	D	L	GF	GA	GD	W	D	L	GF	GA	GD
46	22	11	13	71	58	+13	77	13	4	6	38	26	+12	9	7	7	33	32	+1

Last updated: 2 May 2026.
Source: Soccerway

==== Results by round ====
Round	1	2	3	4	5	6	7	8	9	10	11	12	13	14	15	17	18	19	20	21	22	23	24	25	26	27	28	29	30	31	33	34	32^{2}	35	37	38	39	40	41	42	16^{1}	44	36^{3}	45	43^{4}	46
Ground	H	A	A	H	H	A	A	H	A	H	A	H	H	A	H	A	A	H	A	H	A	H	H	A	A	H	A	A	H	H	A	H	A	A	A	H	A	H	H	A	A	A	H	H	H	A
Result	W	W	D	L	W	D	L	D	W	D	W	W	W	W	L	L	D	W	L	W	L	W	D	L	W	W	D	W	W	D	L	W	L	L	L	W	D	W	W	D	W	D	L	W	L	W
Position	5	3	4	8	5	8	9	10	8	7	7	4	5	1	1	5	5	4	6	5	6	4	4	6	4	4	5	4	4	4	5	4	5	5	7	5	5	5	5	5	5	5	5	5	5	3
Points	3	6	7	7	10	11	11	12	15	16	19	22	25	28	28	28	29	32	32	35	35	38	39	39	42	45	46	49	52	53	53	56	56	56	56	59	60	63	66	67	70	71	71	74	74	77

Source: EFL
A = Away; H = Home; W = Win; D = Draw; L = Loss; P = Postponed
Notes:
- ^{1} Matchday 16 (vs. AFC Wimbledon) was postponed due to international call-ups.
- ^{2} Matchday 32 (vs. Burton Albion) was postponed due to opposition's FA Cup progression to the fourth round.
- ^{3} Matchday 36 (vs. Mansfield Town) was postponed due to opposition's FA Cup progression to the fifth round.
- ^{4} Matchday 43 (vs. Port Vale) was postponed due to progress to the EFL Trophy final.

==== Matches ====
Win Draw Loss Fixtures

3 August 2025 1	Stockport County	2–0	Bolton Wanderers	Edgeley
12:00 BST	Mothersille 45+2'; Diamond (yellow card) 68'; Moxon (yellow card) 74'; Wootton 89'	Report	Simons (yellow card) 77'	Stadium: Edgeley Park; Attendance: 10,172 (1,205 away); Referee: Elliott Bell

9 August 2025 2	Wycombe Wanderers	1–2	Stockport County	High Wycombe
15:00 BST	Harvie (yellow card) 19'; Lowry (penalty missed) 60'; Taylor (yellow card) 65'; Mullins 74'; Leahy (yellow card) 78'	Report	Wootton 9'; Diamond 51'; Bailey (yellow card) 81'	Stadium: Adams Park; Attendance: 5,590 (861 away); Referee: Oliver Yates

16 August 2025 3	Leyton Orient	2–2	Stockport County	Leyton
15:00 BST	Connolly (yellow card) 21', (goal) 57'; Happe (yellow card) 35'; O'Neill 90+3'	Report	Norwood (yellow card) 21'; Lowe 29'; Diamond (yellow card) 34'; Olowu 36'	Stadium: Brisbane Road; Attendance: 7,651 (702 away); Referee: Ruebyn Ricardo

19 August 2025 4	Stockport County	1–2	Bradford City	Edgeley
19:45 BST	Moxon 16', (yellow card) 74'	Report	Tilt (yellow card) 43'; Swan 49'; Sarcevic 72'; Leigh (yellow card) 90+1'	Stadium: Edgeley Park; Attendance: 9,641 (1,199 away); Referee: Thomas Parsons

23 August 2025 5	Stockport County	2–1	Burton Albion	Edgeley
15:00 BST	Hills (red card) 31'; Fevrier (yellow card) 54'; Pye (yellow card) 58'; Diamond 69'; Norwood 77'; Moxon (yellow card) 90+1'	Report	Godwin-Malife 24'	Stadium: Edgeley Park; Attendance: 8,649 (294 away); Referee: Seb Stockbridge

30 August 2025 6	Wigan Athletic	1–1	Stockport County	Wigan
15:00 BST	Saydee 78'; Smith (yellow card) 90+1'	Report	Fevrier 4'; Connolly (yellow card) 63'; Andrew (yellow card) 90'	Stadium: Brick Community Stadium; Attendance: 11,078 (2,669 away); Referee: Ross Joyce

6 September 2025 7	Plymouth Argyle	4–2	Stockport County	Plymouth
15:00 BST	Mitchell (yellow card) 8'; Wotton 24' (o.g.); Watts 39'; Ibrahim 48'; Sorinola (yellow card) 62'; Tolaj 75'	Report	Fevrier (yellow card) 35'; Norwood 45+1' (pen.); Wootton 90+5'	Stadium: Home Park; Attendance: 15,719; Referee: Neil Hair

13 September 2025 8	Stockport County	1–1	Cardiff City	Edgeley
15:00 BST	Norwood 34' (pen.)	Report	Ng (yellow card) 40'; Salech 90+7'	Stadium: Edgeley Park; Attendance: 9,956 (1,158 away); Referee: Simon Mather

20 September 2025 9	Rotherham United	0–1	Stockport County	Rotherham
15:00 BST	Jules (yellow card) 12'; Hugill (yellow card) 13'; Kelly (yellow card) 88'	Report	O'Keeffe (yellow card) 23'; Wootton (yellow card) 53', (goal) 60'	Stadium: New York Stadium; Attendance: 8,784 (1,547 away); Referee: David Rock

27 September 2025 10	Stockport County	1–1	Reading	Edgeley
15:00 BST	Wootton 22'; Bailey (yellow card) 75'	Report	Marriott 72'; Burns (yellow card) 74'	Stadium: Edgeley Park; Attendance: 9,249 (885 away); Referee: Oliver Mackey

4 October 2025 11	Huddersfield Town	1–2	Stockport County	Huddersfield
15:00 BST	Castledine (yellow card) 18'; Roosken (yellow card) 82'; Radulović 90+2'	Report	Norwood 45+4' (pen.); Onyango (yellow card) 48' (yellow-red card) 53'; Hills (yellow card) 64'; Bailey 78'	Stadium: Kirklees Stadium; Attendance: 18,707; Referee: Ben Toner

11 October 2025 12	Stockport County	1–0	Blackpool	Edgeley
15:00 BST	Olowu 63'	Report	Evans (yellow card) 9'; Brown (yellow card) 85'	Stadium: Edgeley Park; Attendance: 10,091 (1,158 away); Referee: Jacob Miles

18 October 2025 13	Stockport County	1–0	Exeter City	Edgeley
15:00 BST	Lowe 24'; Norwood (yellow card) 69'	Report	Cole (yellow card) 20'	Stadium: Edgeley Park; Attendance: 9,190 (504 away); Referee: Aaron Bannister

27 October 2025 14	Port Vale	0–3	Stockport County	Burslem
20:00 GMT			Lowe 13', (yellow card) 40'; Wootton 23'; Diamond 29'	Stadium: Vale Park; Attendance: 8,452; Referee: Edward Duckworth
Note: Fixture was originally scheduled for 25 October, but was rescheduled for live Sky Sports broadcasting.

8 November 2025 15	Stockport County	0–3	Luton Town	Edgeley
15:00 GMT	Dodgson (yellow card) 20' (yellow-red card) 81'; Lowe (penalty missed) 56'	Report	Naismith (yellow card) 30'; Richards 34'; Bramall 38', (yellow card) 41'; Saville (yellow card) 54'; Keeley (yellow card) 65'; Jones 69'	Stadium: Edgeley Park; Attendance: 10,090 (1,158 away); Referee: Josh Smith

20 November 2025 17	Peterborough United	3–0	Stockport County	Peterborough
20:00 GMT	Woods 5'; Leonard (yellow card) 8'; Lisbie 37'; Khela 76'	Report	Connolly (yellow card) 13'	Stadium: London Road Stadium; Attendance: 6,681 (574 away); Referee: Matthew Russell

29 November 2025 18	Stockport County	1–1	Barnsley	Edgeley
12:30 GMT	Connolly 89'	Report	Yoganathan 27'; Connell (yellow card) 30'	Stadium: Edgeley Park; Attendance: 9,861 (1,154 away); Referee: Criag Hicks
Note: Fixture was originally scheduled for 25 October, but was rescheduled for live Sky Sports broadcasting.

9 December 2025 19	Doncaster Rovers	0–2	Stockport County	Doncaster
19:45 GMT	Sharp (yellow card) 38'; Broadbent (yellow card) 40'; Molyneux (yellow card) 55'; Bailey (yellow card) 90+6'	Report	Olowu (yellow card) 10'; Osborn 59', (yellow card) 83'; Wootton 66'	Stadium: Eco-Power Stadium; Attendance: 7,929 (1,077 away); Referee: Martin Woods

13 December 2025 20	Stockport County	1–3	Stevenage	Edgeley
15:00 GMT	Wootton 62'; Hunt (yellow card) 83'	Report	Campbell 22'; Reid 53'; Thompson 64'; Freestone (yellow card) 79'; Phillips (yellow card) 85'	Stadium: Edgeley Park; Attendance: 8,898 (232 away); Referee: Will Finnie

20 December 2025 21	Mansfield Town	1–2	Stockport County	Mansfield
15:00 GMT	Wootton 28' (o.g.); Evans (yellow card) 41'; Oshilaja (yellow card) 66'	Report	Pye (yellow card) 20'; Sweeney 42' (o.g.); Hills (yellow card) 61'; Diamond 69'	Stadium: Field Mill; Attendance: 8,016 (1,053 away fans); Referee: Alan Young

26 December 2025 22	Stockport County	1–2	Lincoln City	Edgeley
15:00 GMT	Onyango (yellow card) 30'; Norwood (penalty missed) 52', (yellow card) 63'; Fevrier 52'	Report	Hackett (yellow card) 26', (goal) 28'; Hamer (yellow card) 50'; Street 90+2'	Stadium: Edgeley Park; Attendance: 9,690 (631 away); Referee: Paul Marsden

29 December 2025 23	Stockport County	4–2	Doncaster Rovers	Edgeley
19:45 GMT	Norwood 29' (pen.), (yellow card) 66'; Edun (yellow card) 38'; Wootton 60', 83'; Bailey (yellow card) 80'; Senior 90+8' (o.g.)	Report	Molyneux 25'; Senior (yellow card) 28'; Bailey 74'; Sharp (yellow card) 90+6'	Stadium: Edgeley Park; Attendance: 9,629 (732 away)

1 January 2026 24	Northampton Town	0–0	Stockport County	Sixfields
15:00 GMT	Taylor (yellow card) 81'	Report	Pye (yellow card) 10'; Fevrier (yellow card) 53'; Norwood (yellow card) 90'	Stadium: Sixfields Stadium; Attendance: 7,050 (838 away); Referee: Darren Drysdale

4 January 2026 25	Reading	1–0	Stockport County	Reading
15:00 GMT	O'Connor (yellow card) 65'; Wing 89'	Report		Stadium: Madejski Stadium; Attendance: 11,703 (816 away); Referee: Jacob Miles

10 January 2026 26	Stockport County	1–0	Huddersfield Town	Edgeley
12:30 GMT	Bailey (yellow card) 45+2'; Pye (yellow card) 58'; Norwood (yellow card) 90+2'; Andrésson 90+6'	Report	Gooch (yellow card) 90+5'	Stadium: Edgeley Park; Attendance: 9,486 (1,158 away); Referee: David Rock

17 January 2026 27	Stockport County	3–2	Rotherham United	Edgeley
15:00 GMT	Raggett 13' (o.g.); Edun (yellow card) 24'; Stokes (yellow card) 53'; Dawson 56' (o.g.); Norwood (yellow card) 71'; Andrésson 76'	Report	Olowu 42' (o.g.); Rafferty (yellow card) 55'; Nombe 60'; Spence (yellow card) 89'	Stadium: Edgeley Park; Attendance: 9,141 (634 away); Referee: Aaron Bannister

24 January 2026 28	Cardiff City	1–1	Stockport County	Leckwith
12:30 GMT	Wintle (yellow card) 27'; Colwill 45+7'; Bagan (yellow card) 49'; Kellyman (yellow card) 74'	Report	Wootton 10', (yellow card) 45+2'; Stokes (yellow card) 87'	Stadium: Cardiff City Stadium; Attendance: 19,684 (1,353 away); Referee: Paul Howard

27 January 2026 29	Blackpool	1–2	Stockport County	Blackpool
19:45 GMT	Brown (yellow card) 65'; Bowler 90+7'	Report	Wootton 31'; Diamond 33'; Osborn (yellow card) 62'	Stadium: Bloomfield Road; Attendance: 9,708 (1,669 away); Referee: Benjamin Speedie

31 January 2026 30	Stockport County	2–1	Plymouth Argyle	Edgeley
15:00 GMT	Wootton 69', 85'	Report	Watts (yellow card) 20', (goal) 42'; Sorinola (yellow card) 45'; Edwards (yellow card) 49'; Sarpong-Wiredu (yellow card) 74'	Stadium: Edgeley Park; Attendance: 10,117 (1,160 away); Referee: Sam Allison

7 February 2026 31	Stockport County	0–0	Leyton Orient	Edgeley
15:00 GMT	Dacres-Cogley (yellow card) 38' (yellow-red card) 80'; Pye (yellow card) 51'	Report	Happe (yellow card) 27'; Forrester (yellow card) 90+12'	Stadium: Edgeley Park; Attendance: 9,162 (478 away); Referee: Andrew Humphries

17 February 2026 33	Bradford City	1–0	Stockport County	Bradford
19:45 GMT	Tilt (yellow card) 24'; Wheatley (yellow card) 42'; Sarcevic 48'; Jackson (yellow card) 90+3'	Report	Sidibeh (yellow card) 14'; Bailey (yellow card) 90+5'	Stadium: Valley Parade; Attendance: 22,488 (2,094 away); Referee: Ross Joyce

21 February 2026 34	Stockport County	4–2	Wigan Athletic	Edgeley
15:00 GMT	Hills 5'; Sidibeh 41'; Norwood (yellow card) 82'; Wootton 90+2', 90+10'	Report	Taylor 2', 11'; Sessegnon (yellow card) 37' (yellow-red card) 60'; Costelloe (yellow card) 57'; Asamoah (red card) 90+4'	Stadium: Edgeley Park; Attendance: 9,938 (1,161 away); Referee: Matt Corlett

24 February 2026 32	Burton Albion	3–0	Stockport County	Burton upon Trent
15:00 GMT	Shade 47', 64'; Evans 55'; Lofthouse (yellow card) 83'	Report	Hills (yellow card) 23'; Pye (yellow card) 61'; Sidibeh (yellow card) 70'; Bate (yellow card) 81'	Stadium: Pirelli Stadium; Attendance: 3,224 (833 away); Referee: Stephen Parkinson
Note: Fixture was initially scheduled for 14 February, but was rearranged due to Burton's FA Cup fourth round progression.

28 February 2026 35	Stevenage	2–1	Stockport County	Stevenage
15:00 GMT	Piergianni 35'; Thompson (yellow card) 55'; Phillips 57'	Report	Stokes (yellow card) 9'; Sidibeh 29', (yellow card) 74'; Diamond (yellow card) 66'; Hills (yellow card) 83'; Pye (yellow card) 87'	Stadium: Broadhall Way; Attendance: 3,974 (592 away); Referee: Jamie O'Connor

14 March 2026 37	Lincoln City	3–1	Stockport County	Lincoln
12:30 GMT	Moylan 10'; Towler (yellow card) 14'; Hamer (yellow card) 70'; Darikwa 87'; Lloyd 90+4'	Report	Diamond 68'; Norwood (yellow card) 78'	Stadium: Sincil Bank; Attendance: 9,759 (1,185 away); Referee: Charles Breakspear
Note: Fixture was initially scheduled for a 15:00 kick-off, but was brought forward for Sky Sports broadcasting.

17 March 2026 38	Stockport County	2–1	Northampton Town	Edgeley
19:45 GMT	Stokes 2'; Olaofe (yellow card) 11'; Wootton 58'	Report	McGeehan 42'; Hoskins (yellow card) 74'	Stadium: Edgeley Park; Attendance: 8,085 (214 away); Referee: Scott Oldham

21 March 2026 39	Luton Town	1–1	Stockport County	Luton
12:30 GMT	Lawrence 28'; Al-Hamadi (yellow card) 77'	Report	Osborn (yellow card) 45+2'; Edun (yellow card) 62'; Norwood 78'	Stadium: Kenilworth Road; Attendance: 10,791; Referee: Bobby Madley
Note: Fixture was initially scheduled for a 15:00 kick-off, but was brought forward for Sky Sports broadcasting.

28 March 2026 40	Stockport County	3–0	AFC Wimbledon	Edgeley
15:00 GMT	Sidibeh 2'; Wootton 39'; Bate (yellow card) 71'; Norwood 90+7'	Report		Stadium: Edgeley Park; Attendance: 9,530 (555 away); Referee: Craig Hicks

3 April 2026 41	Stockport County	3–0	Wycombe Wanderers	Edgeley
15:00 BST	Bailey 20', (yellow card) 54'; Diamond (yellow card) 30'; Olaofe 41'; Pye (yellow card) 52'; Sidibeh 82'	Report	Henderson (yellow card) 56'	Stadium: Edgeley Park; Attendance: 9,476 (561 away); Referee: Elliot Bell

6 April 2026 42	Bolton Wanderers	2–2	Stockport County	Horwich
15:00 BST	Kenny 39'; Osborn 79' (o.g.)	Report	Sidibeh 45+3', (yellow card) 80'; Edun 51'; Barry (yellow card) 89' (yellow-red card) 90+4'	Stadium: Toughsheet Community Stadium; Attendance: 23,855 (2,445 away); Referee: Stephen Martin

15 April 2026 16	AFC Wimbledon	0–2	Stockport County	Wimbledon
19:45 BST	Reeves (yellow card) 22'	Report	Pye (yellow card) 45+1'; Stokes 59'; Wootton (yellow card) 62'; Edun 72'; Dixon (yellow card) 86'; Norwood (yellow card) 89'	Stadium: Plough Lane; Attendance: 8,040 (708 away); Referee: Darren Drysdale
Note: Fixture was originally scheduled for 15 November, but it was postponed due to international call-ups.

18 April 2026 44	Exeter City	3–3	Stockport County	Exeter
15:00 BST	Cole 35'; Tuterov 70'; Bycroft 90+6'	Report	Mothersille 9'; Edun (yellow card) 16'; Stokes 29'; Bailey 77'	Stadium: St James Park; Attendance: 6,653 (491 away); Referee: Kirsty Dowle

21 April 2026 36	Stockport County	0–1	Mansfield Town	Edgeley
19:45 BST	Osborn (yellow card) 37'; Wootton (yellow card) 90+5'	Report	McLaughlin (yellow card) 42'; Knoyle (yellow card) 45'; Sweeney (yellow card) 49'; Roberts 63'; Evans (yellow card) 71'; Blake-Tracy (yellow card) 82'	Stadium: Edgeley Park; Attendance: 8,763 (839 away); Referee: Scott Jackson
Note: Fixture was originally scheduled for 7 March, but was postponed due to Mansfield in FA Cup fifth round involvements.

25 April 2026 45	Stockport County	3–1	Peterborough United	Edgeley
12:30 BST	Barry 28', 48', 64'; Bailey (yellow card) 53'; Edun (yellow card) 57'		Leonard 13'; Mills (yellow card) 45+1'	Stadium: Edgeley Park; Attendance: 9,432; Referee: Jacob Miles
Note: Fixture was initially scheduled for a 15:00 kick-off, but was brought forward for live Sky Sports broadcasting.

28 April 2026 43	Stockport County	1–2	Port Vale	Edgeley
19:45 BST	Gardner (yellow card) 36'; Bailey 86'; Osborn (yellow card) 90+1'	Report	Sherif 4'; Gabriel 23'	Stadium: Edgeley Park; Attendance: 8,884 (601 away); Referee: Alex Chilowicz
Note: Fixture was initially scheduled for 11 April, but was rearranged due to progression to the EFL Trophy final.

2 May 2026 46	Barnsley	1–3	Stockport County	Barnsley
15:00 BST	Bland (yellow card) 12'; Phillips 52'	Report	Sidibeh 23'; Norwood 71', (yellow card) 90+6'; Fiorini (yellow card) 90'; Andrésson 90+9'; Pye (yellow card) 90+9'	Stadium: Oakwell; Attendance: 12,940 (2,609 away); Referee: Seb Stockbridge

==== Play-offs ====
Stockport finished 3rd in the regular season and were drawn against 6th place Stevenage.

9 May 2026 Semi-finals first leg	Stevenage	0–1	Stockport County	Stevenage
15:00 BST	Roberts (yellow card) 58'; Piergianni (yellow card) 63'	Report	Sidibeh (yellow card) 53'; Osborn 90+4'	Stadium: Broadhall Way; Attendance: 7,321 (1,339 away); Referee: Charles Breakspear

13 May 2026 Semi-finals second leg	Stockport County	2–0 (3–0 agg.)	Stevenage	Edgeley
20:00 BST	Barry 14'; Wootton 28'; Norwood (yellow card) 68'	Report	Goode (yellow card) 41'; Kemp (yellow card) 67'	Stadium: Edgeley Park; Attendance: 10,243 (1,051 away); Referee: Josh Smith

24 May 2026 Final	Bolton Wanderers	4–1	Stockport County	Wembley
13:00 BST	Rodrigues 3', 90+4' (pen.); Wootton 64' (o.g.); Dalby 81'	Report	Sidibeh 29'; Wootton (yellow card) 60'; Bailey (yellow card) 80'; Dacres-Cogley (red card) 90+2'	Stadium: Wembley Stadium; Attendance: 48,268; Referee: Josh Smith

=== FA Cup ===
Stockport were drawn away to Tranmere Rovers in the first round and at home to Cambridge United in the second round.

Win Draw Loss Fixtures

1 November 2025 First round	Tranmere Rovers	1–3	Stockport County	Birkenhead
15:00 GMT	Patrick 71'; Smallwood (yellow card) 88'; Finley (yellow card) 90+3'	Report	Diamond 55'; Norwood 74'; Lowe 90+1'	Stadium: Prenton Park; Attendance: 5,164 (1,504 away); Referee: Simon Mather

6 December 2025 Second round	Stockport County	0–0 (4–5 p)	Cambridge United	Edgeley
15:00 GMT	Hunt (yellow card) 26'	Report	Watts (yellow card) 109'; Hoddle (yellow card) 117'	Stadium: Edgeley Park; Attendance: 5,105; Referee: Richard Eley
	Penalties
	Moxon (penalty missed); Osborn (penalty scored); Diamond (penalty scored); Wootton (penalty scored); O'Keeffe (penalty scored)		Smith (penalty scored); Watts (penalty scored); McConnell (penalty scored); Mayor (penalty scored); Gibbons (penalty scored)

=== EFL Cup ===
Stockport were drawn at home to Crewe Alexandra in the first round and away to Wigan Athletic in the second round.

Win Draw Loss Fixtures

12 August 2025 First round	Stockport County	3–1	Crewe Alexandra	Edgeley
19:30 BST	Andrew (yellow card) 31'; Wootton 49'; Lowe 52'; Connolly (yellow card) 56'; Fiorini 77'	Report	Tezgel 86'	Stadium: Edgeley Park; Attendance: 4,945 (908 away); Referee: Scott Jackson

26 August 2025 Second round	Wigan Athletic	1–0	Stockport County	Wigan
19:45 BST	Murray 84'	Report	O'Keeffe (yellow card) 45+3'	Stadium: Brick Community Stadium; Referee: Tom Reeves

=== EFL Trophy ===
Stockport were drawn against Salford City, Wigan Athletic and Wolverhampton Wanderers U21 in the group stage. After finishing second in the group, County were drawn away to Crewe Alexandra in the round of 32, at home to Harrogate Town in the round of 16, away to Port Vale in the quarter-finals and away to Doncaster Rovers in the semi-finals.

Pos	Div	Team	Pld	W	PW	PL	L	GF	GA	GD	Pts	Qualification
1	L2	Salford City	3	3	0	0	0	9	3	+6	9	Advance to Round 2
2	L1	Stockport County	3	1	1	0	1	7	7	0	5	Advance to Round 2
3	ACA	Wolverhampton Wanderers U21	3	1	0	0	2	7	10	−3	3	
4	L1	Wigan Athletic	3	0	0	1	2	2	5	−3	1	

Source: EFL

Win Draw Loss Fixtures

2 September 2025 North Group A	Stockport County	5–3	Wolverhampton Wanderers U21	Edgeley
19:00 BST	Lowe 20' 24'; Grogan (yellow card) 23'; Bailey 52'; Hills (yellow card) 66'; Astles 79' 83'	Report	Edozie 9'; Mané 12'; Holman (yellow card) 54'; Okoduwa 57'; Lopes (yellow card) 74'	Stadium: Edgeley Park; Attendance: 1,014; Referee: Robert Massey-Ellis

7 October 2025 North Group A	Salford City	3–1	Stockport County	Kersal
19:00 BST	Austerfield 34'; Butcher (yellow card) 44'; Bird 55' (pen.); Cesay 70'	Report	O'Keeffe (yellow card) 74'; Bailey 85'	Stadium: Moor Lane; Attendance: 1,429 (472 County fans); Referee: Jamie O'Connor

11 November 2025 North Group A	Stockport County	1–1 (6–5 p)	Wigan Athletic	Edgeley
19:00 GMT	O'Keeffe 32'; Moxon (yellow card) 74'	Report	McManaman (yellow card) 14'; Costelloe 39'; Brenan (yellow card) 50'	Stadium: Edgeley Park; Attendance: 1,337 (240 away); Referee: Scott Oldham
	Penalties
	Fiorini (penalty scored); Dodgson (penalty scored); Fevrier (penalty scored); Moxon (penalty missed); O'Keeffe (penalty scored); Addai (penalty scored); Cina (penalty scored)		Murray (penalty scored); Kerr (penalty scored); Aimson (penalty scored); Costelloe (penalty scored); Fox (penalty missed); Bettoni (penalty scored); Weir (penalty missed)

3 December 2025 Round of 32	Crewe Alexandra	1–1 (1–4 p)	Stockport County	Crewe
19:00 GMT	Thibaut 5'	Report	Andrésson 33'	Stadium: Gresty Road; Attendance: 1,535 (636 away); Referee: Richie Watkins
	Penalties
	Tezgel (penalty missed); March (penalty missed); Agius (penalty scored)		Dodgson (penalty scored); Moxon (penalty scored); Fevrier (penalty scored); Diamond (penalty scored)

13 January 2026 Round of 16	Stockport County	2–1	Harrogate Town	Edgeley
19:00 GMT	Stokes 77', 90+4'	Report	Cursons 49'	Stadium: Edgeley Park; Attendance: 1,442 (111 away); Referee: James Oldham

10 February 2026 Quarter-finals	Port Vale	0–4	Stockport County	Burslem
19:00 GMT	Heneghan (yellow card) 72'; Shipley (yellow card) 81'	Report	Edun (yellow card) 27'; Sidibeh 36', 59'; Amos 83' (o.g.); Norwood (yellow card) 89'; Diamond 90+1'	Stadium: Vale Park; Attendance: 1,577 (483 away); Referee: Peter Wright

3 March 2026 Semi-finals	Doncaster Rovers	0–1	Stockport County	Doncaster
20:00 GMT	Pearson (yellow card) 79'; Molyneux (yellow card) 90'	Report	Norwood 11'; Dixon (yellow card) 53'	Stadium: Eco-Power Stadium; Attendance: 5,418 (1,179 away); Referee: Will Finnie

12 April 2026 Final	Luton Town	3–1	Stockport County	Wembley
15:00 BST	Lawrence 22'; Wells 39', 90+1', (yellow card) 90+2'; Richards (yellow card) 76'; Jones (yellow card) 78'	Report	Sidibeh 11'; Pye (yellow card) 37'	Stadium: Wembley Stadium; Attendance: 49,517; Referee: Martin Coy

== Statistics ==
=== Appearances and goals ===
As of match played 13 May 2026

Players with no appearances are not included on the list; italics indicate a loaned in player

No.	Pos	Nat	Player	Total		League One		FA Cup		EFL Cup		EFL Trophy		League One play-offs	
No.	Pos	Nat	Player	Apps	Goals	Apps	Goals	Apps	Goals	Apps	Goals	Apps	Goals	Apps	Goals
1	GK	(England) ENG	Ben Hinchliffe	28	0	25+0	0	0+0	0	2+0	0	1+0	0	0+0	0
2	DF	(England) ENG	Josh Dacres-Cogley	17	0	15+0	0	0+0	0	0+0	0	0+0	0	2+0	0
3	DF	(England) ENG	Owen Dodgson	25	0	9+7	0	1+1	0	1+1	0	3+2	0	0+0	0
4	MF	(England) ENG	Lewis Bate	17	0	4+10	0	0+0	0	0+0	0	2+1	0	0+0	0
5	DF	(England) ENG	Joseph Olowu	41	2	24+7	2	1+1	0	1+0	0	7+0	0	0+0	0
7	FW	(England) ENG	Jack Diamond	57	8	36+9	6	2+0	1	0+2	0	5+1	1	0+2	0
8	MF	(Northern Ireland) NIR	Callum Camps	11	0	5+5	0	0+1	0	0+0	0	0+0	0	0+0	0
9	FW	(England) ENG	Tanto Olaofe	21	1	8+8	1	0+0	0	0+0	0	1+2	0	0+2	0
10	FW	(England) ENG	Jayden Fevrier	28	2	7+14	2	2+0	0	0+2	0	2+1	0	0+0	0
11	FW	(Jamaica) JAM	Malik Mothersille	38	2	15+15	2	1+0	0	0+0	0	5+1	0	0+1	0
12	DF	(England) ENG	Roman Dixon	9	0	2+5	0	0+0	0	0+0	0	1+1	0	0+0	0
14	DF	(England) ENG	Tayo Edun	30	2	17+7	2	0+1	0	0+0	0	3+0	0	2+0	0
15	DF	(England) ENG	Ethan Pye	54	0	46+0	0	2+0	0	1+0	0	3+0	0	2+0	0
16	MF	(England) ENG	Callum Connolly	19	1	12+3	1	2+0	0	1+0	0	1+0	0	0+0	0
17	DF	(England) ENG	Jay Mingi	1	0	0+0	0	0+0	0	1+0	0	0+0	0	0+0	0
18	MF	(Scotland) SCO	Lewis Fiorini	15	1	0+9	0	0+0	0	2+0	1	3+0	0	0+1	0
19	FW	(England) ENG	Kyle Wootton	54	20	44+2	18	1+1	0	1+0	1	2+1	0	2+0	1
20	FW	(England) ENG	Louie Barry	9	4	3+3	3	0+0	0	0+0	0	0+1	0	2+0	1
21	MF	(England) ENG	Owen Moxon	27	1	11+10	1	1+1	0	0+0	0	4+0	0	0+0	0
22	FW	(Iceland) ISL	Benoný Breki Andrésson	22	4	8+9	3	0+0	0	1+0	0	1+1	1	0+2	0
23	MF	(England) ENG	Ben Osborn	44	2	32+6	1	1+1	0	0+0	0	2+0	0	2+0	1
24	MF	(England) ENG	Tyler Onyango	13	0	10+0	0	1+0	0	0+0	0	2+0	0	0+0	0
26	MF	(Northern Ireland) NIR	Oliver Norwood	49	10	41+0	8	1+0	1	1+1	0	3+0	1	2+0	0
27	MF	(England) ENG	Odin Bailey	56	6	32+11	4	2+0	0	2+0	0	3+4	2	2+0	0
28	MF	(England) ENG	Josh Stokes	25	5	13+7	3	0+0	0	0+0	0	2+1	2	2+0	0
29	FW	(The Gambia) GAM	Adama Sidibeh	24	9	13+6	6	0+0	0	0+0	0	3+0	3	2+0	0
33	DF	(England) ENG	Brad Hills	31	1	27+1	1	0+0	0	0+0	0	2+1	0	0+0	0
34	GK	(Jamaica) JAM	Corey Addai	32	0	21+0	0	2+0	0	0+0	0	7+0	0	2+0	0
41	DF	(Germany) GER	Jid Okeke	5	0	0+2	0	0+0	0	1+1	0	1+0	0	0+0	0
42	MF	(England) ENG	Corey Edwards	5	0	0+0	0	0+0	0	0+0	0	4+1	0	0+0	0
44	DF	(Wales) WAL	Rhys Watson	2	0	0+0	0	0+0	0	0+0	0	0+2	0	0+0	0
45	DF	(Republic of Ireland) IRL	Christy Grogan	4	0	0+2	0	0+0	0	0+0	0	2+0	0	0+0	0
46	DF	(England) ENG	Nathaniel Mapengu	1	0	0+0	0	0+0	0	0+0	0	0+1	0	0+0	0
47	FW	(Montserrat) MSR	Arian Allen	4	0	0+0	0	0+0	0	0+2	0	1+1	0	0+0	0
48	FW	(England) ENG	Che Gardner	18	0	5+5	0	0+1	0	1+1	0	4+1	0	0+0	0
49	FW	(England) ENG	Marcus Kouam	1	0	0+0	0	0+0	0	0+0	0	0+1	0	0+0	0
56	FW	(England) ENG	Bruno Cina	2	0	0+0	0	0+0	0	0+0	0	0+2	0	0+0	0
58	MF	(England) ENG	Saul Gardner	1	0	0+0	0	0+0	0	0+0	0	0+1	0	0+0	0
60	DF	(England) ENG	Jake Lewis	1	0	0+0	0	0+0	0	0+0	0	0+1	0	0+0	0
65	FW	(England) ENG	Joe Astles	4	2	0+0	0	0+0	0	0+0	0	0+4	2	0+0	0
Players who featured but departed the club during the season:
2	DF	(Republic of Ireland) IRL	Corey O'Keeffe	23	1	10+6	0	0+2	0	2+0	0	3+0	1	0+0	0
9	FW	(England) ENG	Nathan Lowe	26	7	8+11	3	1+1	1	2+0	1	3+0	2	0+0	0
23	DF	(England) ENG	Danny Andrew	7	0	1+4	0	0+0	0	2+0	0	0+0	0	0+0	0
31	DF	(England) ENG	Jack Hunt	13	0	2+8	0	1+0	0	0+0	0	2+0	0	0+0	0
40	MF	(England) ENG	Ashton Mee	2	0	0+0	0	0+0	0	0+0	0	0+2	0	0+0	0
