= Ethan Pye =

English footballer (born 2003)

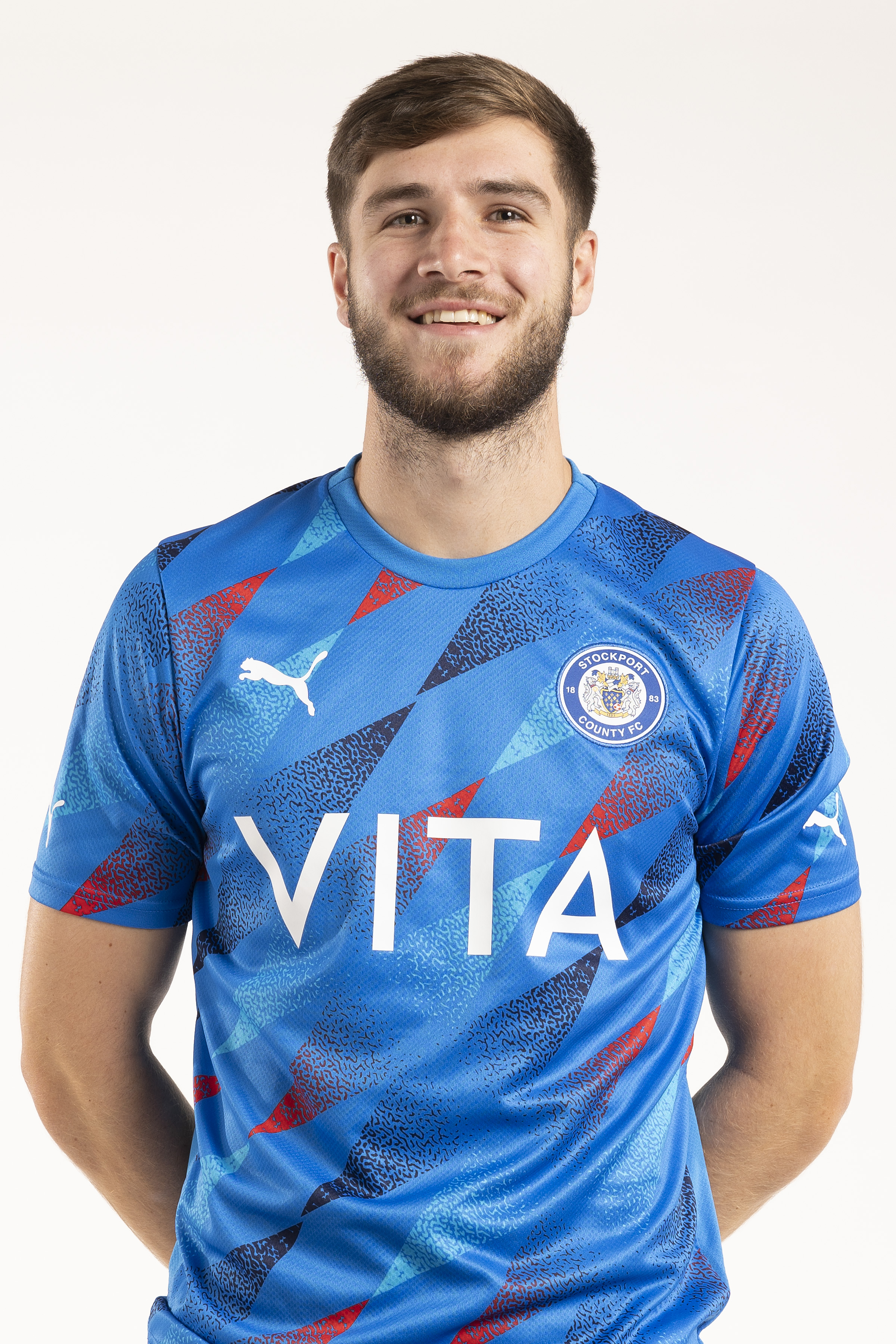
- Ethan Pye, Stockport County FC

Personal information
- Full name: Ethan Joseph Pye
- Date of birth: 27 January 2003 (age 23)
- Place of birth: Bury, England
- Height: 1.83 m (6 ft 0 in)
- Position: Central defender

Team information
- Current team: Stockport County
- Number: 5

Youth career
- Hyde United
- –2021: Rochdale

Senior career*
Years	Team	Apps	(Gls)
2021–	Stockport County	136	(2)
2022	→ Spennymoor Town (loan)	21	(0)
2022–2023	→ Gateshead (loan)	38	(1)
- * Club domestic league appearances and goals as of 00:07, 25 October 2026 (UTC)

Ethan Joseph Pye (born 27 January 2003) is an English professional footballer who plays as a central defender for EFL League One club Stockport County.

Pye came through the youth academy of Hyde United before joining Rochdale's youth setup. He made his senior debut for the Hatters in 2021 and subsequently spent loan spells at Spennymoor Town and Gateshead in 2022 and 2022–23, respectively. Upon returning to Stockport, he helped the club win the 2023–24 EFL League Two title.

== Career ==
=== Early years ===
Pye came through the youth academy of Hyde United. In 2021, Pye joined the youth setup of Rochdale, where he played multiple games, one of which was the final of the 2020–21 Youth Alliance Cup, where he scored a headed goal to ensure their 3–0 victory away at Gillingham. Pye played two games for Stoke City U18s as a trialist, but did not sign on permanently.

=== Stockport County ===
Prior to the 2021–22 season, Pye joined National League side, Stockport County, on a two-year deal. With injuries to starting centre-backs, Ben Barclay and Zeki Fryers, Pye would make his debut for Stockport in a 2–1 win against Weymouth. Pye would also feature in a 5–2 win over Dover Athletic and a 2–2 draw against EFL side, Bolton Wanderers, in the FA Cup.

==== Spennymoor Town (loan) ====
On 6 January 2022, Pye joined National League North side, Spennymoor Town, on an initial three-month loan. Two days later, Pye would start in a 2–1 win against Guiseley. Pye quickly established himself in the team and would play 21 league games in total at Spennymoor, who would go on to finish 10th in the league.

==== Gateshead (loan) ====
In July 2022, Pye became the seventh signing for the National League side, Gateshead, joining on a season-long loan. Pye made his debut in the first league game of the season, which ended in a 2–2 draw with Dagenham & Redbridge. However, Pye would be forced off after just 38 minutes. Similar to when at Spennymoor, Pye quickly became one of the first names on the team sheet and became a fan favourite. Pye would score his first ever professional goal in a 4–0 victory against Maidenhead United, on the final day of the season. Despite being relegation favourites, Gateshead finished the season 14th, with Pye playing in 45 games across all competitions during the campaign. Gateshead also reached the final of the FA Trophy but despite an agreement that would allow Pye to play, Stockport recalled him days before the final. Gateshead would lose 1–0 to FC Halifax Town. He would win the Gateshead Player of the Month award in January and March, while also being voted as the Gateshead Players' Player of the Year.

==== Return to Stockport ====
While out on loan, Pye had agreed a new deal with Stockport, which will see him stay until at least 2024.

== Style of play ==
Pye is a left-footed defender. He can play in multiple positions across the back line. At Spennymoor Town, Pye was utilised across the back line, mainly playing as a centre-back. At Gateshead, Pye began as a left-back but was moved to centre-back, where he played more often. At Stockport, he is being used as a left-sided centre-back as part of a back-three.

== Career statistics ==
As of match played 24 October 2026

Appearances and goals by club, season and competition
Club	Season	League			FA Cup		League Cup		Other		Total	
Club	Season	Division	Apps	Goals	Apps	Goals	Apps	Goals	Apps	Goals	Apps	Goals
Stockport County	2021–22	National League	2	0	1	0	—		—		3	0
Stockport County	2022–23	League Two	0	0	—		0	0	—		0	0
Stockport County	2023–24	League Two	35	1	3	0	1	0	3 (Note: Appearances in EFL Trophy)	0	42	1
Stockport County	2024–25	League One	42	1	2	0	0	0	5 (Note: Three appearances in the EFL Trophy, two appearances in the League One play-offs)	0	49	1
Stockport County	2025–26	League One	46	0	2	0	1	0	6 (Note: Three appearances in the EFL Trophy, three appearances in the League One play-offs)	0	55	0
Stockport County	2026–27	League One	11	0	0	0	1	0	0	0	12	0
Stockport County	Total		136	2	8	0	3	0	14	0	161	2
Spennymoor Town (loan)	2021–22	National League North	21	0	—		—		2 (Note: Appearances in FA Trophy)	0	23	0
Gateshead (loan)	2022–23	National League	38	1	3	0	—		4	0	45	1
Career total			195	3	11	0	3	0	20	0	229	3

== Honours ==
Gateshead

- FA Trophy runner-up: 2022–23

Stockport County

- EFL League Two: 2023–24
- EFL Trophy runner-up: 2025–26

Individual

- Gateshead Players' Player of the Season: 2022–23
- Gateshead Player of the Month: January 2023, March 2023
