= Roman Dixon =

English footballer (born 2004)

Personal information
- Full name: Roman Ivan Quintyne Dixon
- Date of birth: 26 December 2004 (age 21)
- Place of birth: Stafford, England
- Position: Right-back

Team information
- Current team: Walsall
- Number: 20

Youth career
- 2016–2024: Everton

Senior career*
Years	Team	Apps	(Gls)
2024–2026	Everton	1	(0)
2026	→ Stockport County (loan)	7	(0)
2026–	Walsall	2	(0)

International career^{‡}
2019	England U16	1	(0)
2024–	England U20	2	(0)
- * Club domestic league appearances and goals as of 14:38, 22 November 2026 (UTC) ‡ National team caps and goals as of 14:21, 18 September 2024 (UTC)

Roman Ivan Quintyne Dixon (born 26 December 2004) is an English professional footballer who plays as a right-back for EFL League Two club Walsall.

== Club career ==
Born in Stafford, Dixon began his career at Everton at under-12 level, signing a new three-year contract in June 2024. In August 2024, following injuries and suspensions to the club's first-team right backs, Dixon made his Premier League debut for Everton away against Tottenham Hotspur on 24 August 2024.

In January 2026 he signed on loan for Stockport County.

On 9 June 2026, Everton announced that they were releasing Dixon at the expiration of his contract that summer. Two months later on 11 August, Dixon signed with EFL League Two club Walsall on a two-year contract.

== International career ==
In October 2019 Dixon played for England under-16 against Scotland. In June 2024 he represented England U20 against Sweden.

== Career statistics ==
As of match played 21 November 2026

Appearances and goals by club, season and competition
Club	Season	League			FA Cup		EFL Cup		Other		Total	
Club	Season	Division	Apps	Goals	Apps	Goals	Apps	Goals	Apps	Goals	Apps	Goals
Everton	2024–25	Premier League	1	0	0	0	2	0	—		3	0
Everton	2025–26	Premier League	0	0	0	0	0	0	—		0	0
Everton	Total		1	0	0	0	2	0	0	0	3	0
Stockport County (loan)	2025–26	League One	7	0	0	0	0	0	1 (Note: Appearance in EFL Trophy)	0	8	0
Walsall	2026–27	League Two	2	0	0	0	0	0	2	0	4	0
Career total			10	0	0	0	2	0	3	0	15	0
