= Kyle Wootton =

Footballer (born 1996)

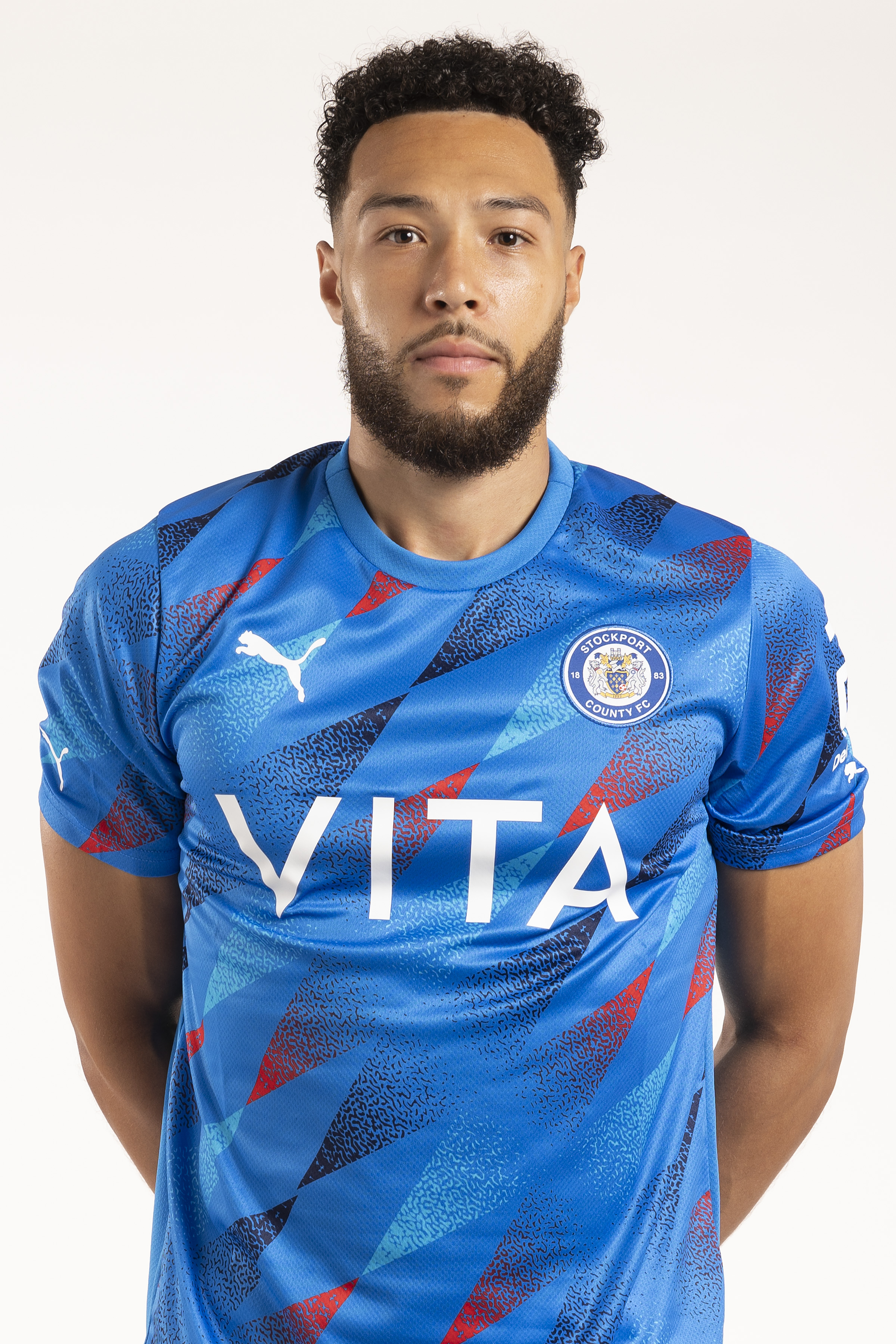
- Wootton with Stockport County

Personal information
- Full name: Kyle Leon Wootton
- Date of birth: 11 October 1996 (age 30)
- Place of birth: Kidderminster, England
- Height: 1.90 m (6 ft 3 in)
- Position: Forward

Team information
- Current team: Stockport County
- Number: 19

Youth career
- 2007–2014: Scunthorpe United

Senior career*
Years	Team	Apps	(Gls)
2014–2020	Scunthorpe United	66	(11)
2015	→ Lincoln City (loan)	5	(1)
2016–2017	→ North Ferriby United (loan)	14	(1)
2017	→ Cheltenham Town (loan)	16	(2)
2017	→ Stevenage (loan)	8	(1)
2018	→ FC Halifax Town (loan)	3	(0)
2019–2020	→ Notts County (loan)	22	(9)
2020–2022	Notts County	94	(38)
2022–	Stockport County	175	(59)
- * Club domestic league appearances and goals as of 06:41, 11 October 2026 (UTC)

Kyle Leon Wootton (born 11 October 1996) is an English professional footballer who plays as a forward for EFL League One club Stockport County.

== Career ==
=== Scunthorpe ===
Wootton joined Scunthorpe United at the age of 10 in 2007, and signed his first professional contract in 2014. He made his first-team debut for Scunthorpe on 26 August 2014, in a 1–0 loss in the second round of the League Cup at home to Reading. He signed an 18-month professional contract in January 2015. In the 2015–16 season, he spent two months on loan at Lincoln City of the National League, and in September 2016 he joined another National League club, North Ferriby United, on loan until January 2017. On 26 January 2017, Wootton joined League Two side Cheltenham Town on loan for the remainder of the 2016–17 campaign.

Wootton joined FC Halifax Town on a one-month loan deal on 29 September 2018.

=== Notts County ===
Wootton signed for Notts County on loan at the beginning of the 2019–20 season. He scored his first for the Magpies in their 1–1 draw away at Sutton United on Saturday 7 September 2019. This was the first of a three game scoring streak. On 8 January 2020, Wootton signed a 30-month contract with Notts County for a fee of £60,000. Wootton scored four braces in his first season wearing Black and White against Boreham Wood, Halifax, Chesterfield FC and Eastleigh FC respectively. He would finish that season top goal scorer for the club.

=== Stockport County ===
On 9 June 2022, Wootton joined newly-promoted Stockport County on a free transfer, signing a three-year deal. He made his debut for the club on 30 July 2022, in a 3–2 defeat to Barrow. He scored his first goal for the club on 13 August 2022, in a 1–0 win against Colchester United. On 23 August 2024, he signed a new three-year contract with the club.

== Career statistics ==
As of 20 October 2026

Appearances and goals by club, season and competition
Club	Season	League			FA Cup		League Cup		Other		Total	
Club	Season	Division	Apps	Goals	Apps	Goals	Apps	Goals	Apps	Goals	Apps	Goals
Scunthorpe United	2014–15	League One	12	1	1	0	1	0	0	0	14	1
Scunthorpe United	2015–16	League One	20	3	2	0	0	0	1 (Note: Appearances in EFL Trophy)	0	23	3
Scunthorpe United	2016–17	League One	2	1	—		2	0	1	0	5	1
Scunthorpe United	2017–18	League One	1	0	—		0	0	0	0	1	0
Scunthorpe United	2018–19	League One	26	6	2	0	0	0	2	0	30	6
Scunthorpe United	2019–20	League Two	5	0	—		0	0	0	0	5	0
Scunthorpe United	Total		66	11	5	0	3	0	4	0	78	11
Lincoln City (loan)	2015–16	National League	5	1	—		—		—		5	1
North Ferriby United (loan)	2016–17	National League	14	1	1	0	—		1 (Note: Appearances in FA Trophy)	0	16	1
Cheltenham Town (loan)	2016–17	League Two	16	2	—		—		—		16	2
Stevenage (loan)	2017–18	League Two	8	1	1	0	0	0	2	1	11	2
FC Halifax Town (loan)	2018–19	National League	3	0	—		—		—		3	0
Notts County (loan)	2019–20	National League	22	9	3	3	—		0	0	25	12
Notts County	2019–20	National League	9	4	—		—		6 (Note: Four appearances two goals in FA Trophy, two appearances in National League play-offs)	2	15	6
Notts County	2020–21	National League	42	15	0	0	—		5 (Note: Three appearances two goals in FA Trophy, two appearances two goals in National League play-offs)	4	47	19
Notts County	2021–22	National League	43	19	4	2	—		3 (Note: Two appearances one goal in FA Trophy, one appearance in National League play-offs)	1	50	22
Notts County	Total		116	47	7	5	—		14	7	137	59
Stockport County	2022–23	League Two	42	14	4	0	1	0	2	0	49	14
Stockport County	2023–24	League Two	32	8	3	4	0	0	2	0	37	12
Stockport County	2024–25	League One	46	11	3	2	0	0	2 (Note: One appearance in EFL Trophy, one appearance in the EFL League One play-offs)	0	51	13
Stockport County	2025–26	League One	46	19	2	0	1	1	6 (Note: Three appearances in EFL Trophy, three appearances and one goal in the EFL League One play-offs)	1	55	21
Stockport County	2026–27	League One	11	9	0	0	1	1	0	0	12	10
Stockport County	Total		177	61	12	6	3	2	12	1	204	70
Career total			405	124	26	11	6	2	33	9	470	146

== Honours ==
Stockport County

- EFL League Two: 2023–24
- EFL Trophy runner-up: 2025–26

Individual

- Stockport County Player of the Season: 2022–23, 2024–25
- EFL League One Team of the Season: 2025–26
- PFA Team of the Year: 2025–26 League One
