= Ben Osborn =

English footballer

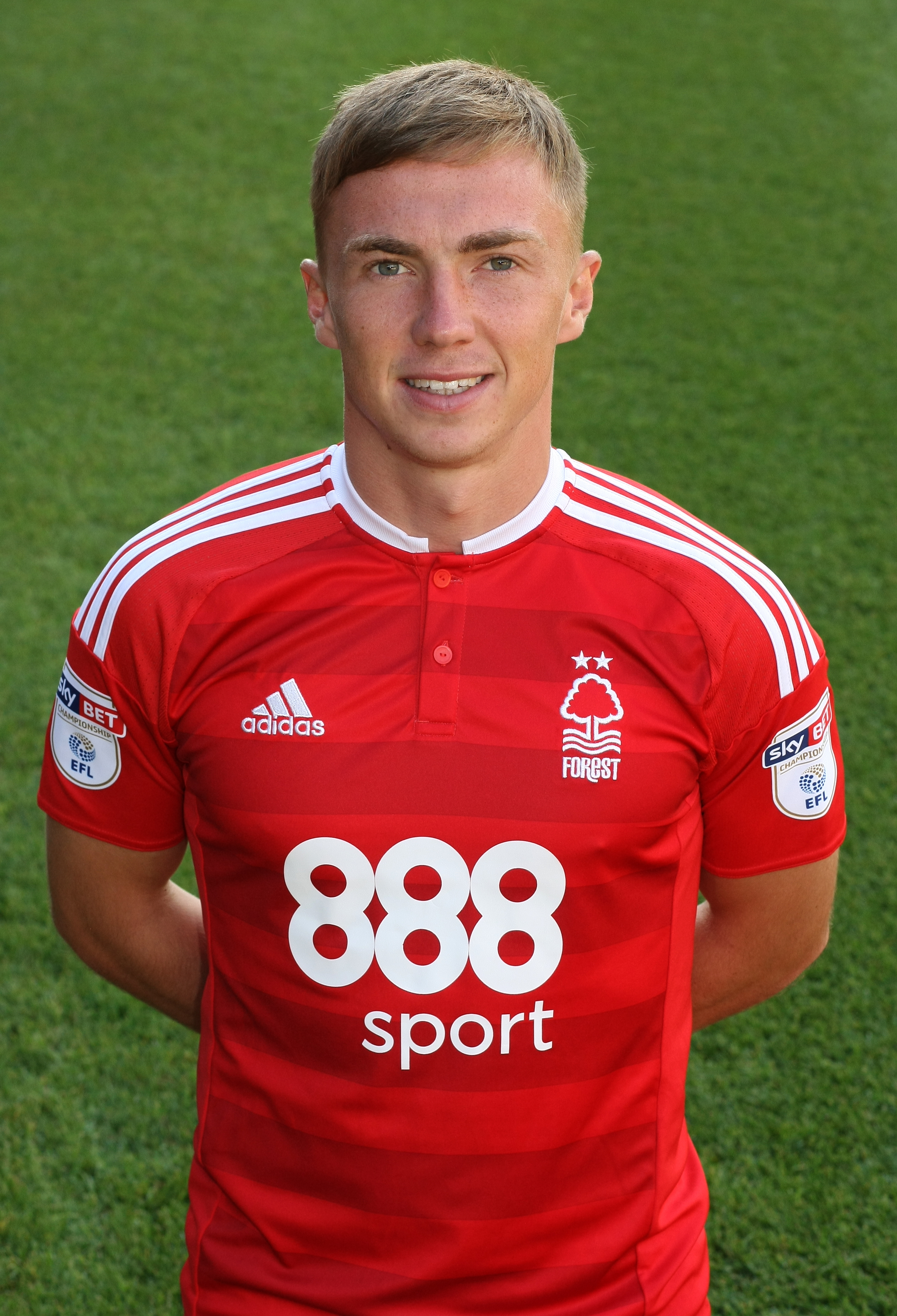
- Osborn with Nottingham Forest in 2016

Personal information
- Full name: Benjamin Jarrod Osborn
- Date of birth: 5 August 1994 (age 32)
- Place of birth: Derby, England
- Height: 5 ft 9 in (1.76 m)
- Positions: Left back; left wing-back

Team information
- Current team: Stockport County
- Number: 23

Youth career
- 2002–2003: Derby County
- 2003–2013: Nottingham Forest

Senior career*
Years	Team	Apps	(Gls)
2013–2019	Nottingham Forest	212	(15)
2019–2024	Sheffield United	115	(5)
2024–2026	Derby County	25	(0)
2025–2026	→ Stockport County (loan)	38	(1)
2026–	Stockport County	12	(0)

International career^{‡}
2012	England U18	1	(0)
2012	England U19	3	(0)
2015	England U20	1	(0)
- * Club domestic league appearances and goals as of 01:13, 26 October 2026 (UTC) ‡ National team caps and goals as of 29 March 2015

Benjamin Jarrod Osborn (born 5 August 1994) is an English professional footballer who plays as a left-back or left wing-back for EFL League One club Stockport County.

He started his career at Nottingham Forest, he then joined Sheffield United for an undisclosed fee in 2019, before leaving the club on a free transfer for Derby County in June 2024. He was loaned to Stockport County, in 2025. Osborn left Derby County after his contract expired in 2026.

Internationally, he has represented England national youth football teams, at under-18, under-19, and under-20 levels.

== Club career ==
=== Nottingham Forest ===
Born in Derby, England, Osborn began playing football when he joined Derby County. Having been released after one season, he joined rivals Nottingham Forest's youth academy at the age of nine. In his first season with the U18 squad, he was frequently used as a left back. In April 2012, Osborn was voted the club's Academy Player of the Year and was awarded with a new contract the following month. Following an injury to Gonzalo Jara, Osborn was promoted to the Forest first team and made his debut for the club in the Championship on 29 March 2014, playing in midfield for the full 90 minutes of a 1–1 away draw with Ipswich Town. Although his debut resulted in a draw, Osborn expressed his delight to make his debut via Twitter. After making eight appearances for the club in the 2013–14 season, it was announced on 29 April that Osborn had signed a new five-year contract with the club.

"No matter what was going on around him, he showed the character and determination. He was unshakable. He had the mentality to say 'do you know what, I am going to go and play my game, regardless of the pressure on this team'. Sometimes as a young man, you can do that. He has done himself no harm in my eyes, during my time at the club." Stuart Pearce on Osborn

Following an impressive pre-season campaign, which included two goals against Ilkeston, Osborn became a prominent member of the first team squad under manager Stuart Pearce at the beginning of the 2014–15 season and was given a number thirty-eight shirt. In the absence of regular midfielders Henri Lansbury and David Vaughan through injury, Osborn featured as a substitute in three of Forest's first four league games and started both their first and second-round games in the League Cup. His performances led Pearce to believe that Osborn had the potential to be a key player for the club. Osborn's first senior goal for Forest was a 92nd-minute winner from 18 yards against fierce local rivals and his hometown club Derby County at Pride Park Stadium on 17 January 2015. Three weeks later on 7 February 2015, Osborn scored his second goal of the season, and setting up the first two goals, in a 3–2 win over Brighton & Hove Albion and his third goal of the season later came on 28 February 2015, in a 3–0 win over Reading. Osborn finished the 2014–15 season having made forty appearances and scoring three times in all competitions. Osborn was also awarded the club's Goal of the Season, which he scored against Derby County on 17 January 2015 and nominated for the Nottinghamshire Professional Footballer of the Year, but lost out to his then-teammate Andy Reid.

At the start of the 2015–16 season, Osborn did not feature under the new management of Dougie Freedman due to a lack of form and appeared in his first match of the season, a 1–1 draw against Bolton Wanderers, on 22 August 2015. During a match against Middlesbrough on 19 September 2015, which they lost 2–1, Osborn suffered a groin injury and was substituted at half-time. After a month on the sidelines, Osborn made his first team return on 31 October 2015 as a substitute for Chris Burke in the 59th minute, in a 0–1 loss against Sheffield Wednesday. On 1 January 2016, Osborn scored his first goal for the season in a 1–1 draw with Charlton Athletic. For his performance against Charlton Athletic, Osborn was voted Man of the Match by fans. On 16 February 2016, having made twenty-three appearances and scored one goal for Forest during the season, Osborn won the Football League Young Player of the Month award for January 2016. After winning the award, Osborn was praised by Freedman as an "exceptional talent" and "fully committed with lots of heart". Osborn later added two more goals in the 2015–16 season against Bristol City and Reading. In the last game of the season Osborn provided two assists, as Nottingham Forest beat already relegated Milton Keynes Dons 2–1. Osborn finished the 2015–16 season having made thirty-eight appearances and scoring three times.

"It was a bit of a shock. I have seen some of the players who have won it and there are some great players. It's good recognition for the way I have been playing... I have progressed and definitely got better, both physically and technically." Osborn on winning the Football League Young Player of the Month award.

The 2016–17 season saw Osborn switch shirt numbers from 38 to 11, which had been vacated by the retirement of Andy Reid, and additionally saw him sign a contract extension, keeping him at Forest until 2020. Osborn made his first start of the 2016–17 season in the opening game of the season, a 4–3 win over Burton Albion, which was also the first competitive match of Philippe Montanier's tenure as manager. Osborn's first goal of the season came on his ninety-ninth league appearance for Forest during a 5–2 win over Barnsley at Oakwell. On 29 November, Osborn was linked to Premier League clubs Watford and Swansea City. Shortly after, Osborn made his 100th league appearance for Forest in a 2–1 defeat of Newcastle United on 2 December. On 21 January 2017 Osborn scored the only goal of the game against Bristol City with a "moment of magic", to end a winless run of eight games for Forest that had ultimately cost Montanier his job. After Matty Cash laid off a free-kick, Osborn flicked the ball up and volleyed it past City goalkeeper Fabian Giefer for his second goal of the season. The goal was nominated for the Dream Moment of the Month of January, while Osborn himself was selected as Forest's Player of the Month. Osborn would score twice more, with goals against Sheffield Wednesday and Brighton & Hove Albion, to finish the season with four goals in forty-nine appearances.

=== Sheffield United ===
On 26 July 2019, Osborn joined newly promoted Premier League side Sheffield United on a three-year deal for an undisclosed fee. In a five-year spell at United, Osborn scored five goals in 134 appearances.

=== Derby County ===
On 28 June 2024, Osborn signed a two-year contract at his hometown club, Derby County, after the expiry of his contract at Sheffield United at the end of June. On 9 August, he made his debut for the club in a 4–2 loss against Blackburn Rovers in the league. In the first two months of the season; Osborn picked-up two injuries, which restricted his game time. Osborn made 26 appearances during his first season for Derby, a hamstring injury in March 2025 further restricted playing time.

Osborn had played twice for Derby during the 2025–26 season, both times in the League Cup. On 1 September 2025, Osborn was loaned out to League One club Stockport County on loan until the end of the 2025–26 season. Osborn played 45 times during his loan spell, scoring two goals as they missed out on promotion to the Championship in the play-off final.

On 15 May 2026, it was announced that Osborn would leave Derby County upon the expiry of his contract in June 2026, he played 28 times for the club, a two-year spell.

=== Stockport County ===
On 27 July 2026, Osborn returned to Stockport County on a one-year contract.

== International career ==
Born in Derby, England, Osborn is eligible to play for England and was first called up by England U18 on 6 March 2012. Osborn made his England U18 debut the next day, in a 3–0 win over Poland U18, which turns out to be his only appearance.

Osborn was called up by England U19 on 20 September 2012 Osborn made his England U19 debut on 26 September 2012, playing 45 minutes, in a 3–0 win over Estonia U19. Osborn went on to make two more appearances against Faroe Islands U19 and Ukraine U19.

Osborn was called up by England U20 for the first time on 20 March 2015 Osborn made his England U20 debut six days later, playing 69 minutes, against Mexico U20 and went on to win 4–2 in penalty shoot-out after game was 1–1.

== Personal life ==
Born in Derby, England, Osborn attended West Park School in Spondon. He grew up supporting Derby County and has twin sisters, Bethan and Holly Osborn.

== Career statistics ==
As of match played 24 October 2026

Appearances and goals by club, season and competition
Club	Season	League			FA Cup		League Cup		Other		Total	
Club	Season	Division	Apps	Goals	Apps	Goals	Apps	Goals	Apps	Goals	Apps	Goals
Nottingham Forest	2013–14	Championship	8	0	0	0	0	0	—		8	0
Nottingham Forest	2014–15	Championship	37	3	0	0	3	0	—		40	3
Nottingham Forest	2015–16	Championship	36	3	2	0	0	0	—		38	3
Nottingham Forest	2016–17	Championship	46	4	1	0	2	0	—		49	4
Nottingham Forest	2017–18	Championship	46	4	2	0	3	0	—		51	4
Nottingham Forest	2018–19	Championship	39	1	1	0	4	1	—		44	2
Nottingham Forest	Total		212	15	6	0	12	1	—		230	16
Sheffield United	2019–20	Premier League	13	0	3	0	2	0	—		18	0
Sheffield United	2020–21	Premier League	24	1	2	0	1	0	—		27	1
Sheffield United	2021–22	Championship	34	3	1	0	2	0	2 (Note: Appearances in the Championship play-offs)	0	39	3
Sheffield United	2022–23	Championship	20	1	3	0	1	0	—		24	1
Sheffield United	2023–24	Premier League	24	0	2	0	0	0	—		26	0
Sheffield United	Total		115	5	11	0	6	0	2	0	134	5
Derby County	2024–25	Championship	25	0	0	0	1	0	—		26	0
Derby County	2025–26	Championship	0	0	0	0	2	0	—		2	0
Derby County	Total		25	0	0	0	3	0	0	0	28	0
Stockport County (loan)	2025–26	League One	38	1	2	0	—		5 (Note: Two appearances in the EFL Trophy, three appearances in the League One play-offs)	1	45	2
Stockport County	2026–27	League One	12	0	0	0	1	0	0	0	13	0
Career total			402	21	19	0	22	1	7	1	450	23

== Honours ==
Stockport County

- EFL Trophy runner-up: 2025–26

Individual

- Nottingham Forest Academy Player of the Year: 2011–12
- Nottingham Forest Goal of the Season: 2014–15
- Football League Young Player of the Month: January 2016
- Nottingham Forest Player of the Season: 2017–18
