= Che Gardner =

Jamaican footballer (born 2007)

Personal information
- Full name: Che-Daniel Ricardo Gardner
- Date of birth: 27 October 2007 (age 19)
- Place of birth: Manchester, England
- Height: 1.69 m (5 ft 7 in)
- Position: Winger

Team information
- Current team: Stockport County
- Number: 28

Youth career
- 2023–2024: Stockport County

Senior career*
Years	Team	Apps	(Gls)
2024–	Stockport County	12	(0)

International career^{‡}
2026–	Jamaica U20	4	(0)
- * Club domestic league appearances and goals as of 21:48, 23 October 2026 (UTC) ‡ National team caps and goals as of 18:44, 29 September 2026 (UTC)

Che-Daniel Ricardo Gardner (born 26 May 2007) is a professional footballer who plays as a winger for EFL League One club Stockport County. Born in England, Gardner represents Jamaica at youth international level.

== Club career ==
He made his senior and professional debut with Stockport County as a substitute in a 2–0 EFL League One over Cambridge United on 10 August 2024. On 15 November 2024, Gardner signed his first professional contract with Stockport County until 2027.

== International career ==
In 2026, Gardner debuted for the Jamaica national under-20 team.

== Personal life ==
Che is the son of the retired Jamaican international footballer Ricardo Gardner.

== Career statistics ==
As of match played on 6 October 2026

Appearances and goals by club, season and competition
Club	Season	League			National cup		League cup		Other		Total	
Club	Season	Division	Apps	Goals	Apps	Goals	Apps	Goals	Apps	Goals	Apps	Goals
Stockport County	2024–25	League One	1	0	0	0	1	0	2 (Note: Appearance(s) in EFL Trophy)	0	4	0
Stockport County	2025–26	League One	10	0	1	0	2	0	5	0	18	0
Stockport County	2026–27	League One	1	0	0	0	0	0	2	1	3	1
Career total			12	0	1	0	3	0	9	1	25	1

== Honours ==
Stockport County

- EFL Trophy runner-up: 2025–26
