= Callum Camps =

Footballer (born 1995)

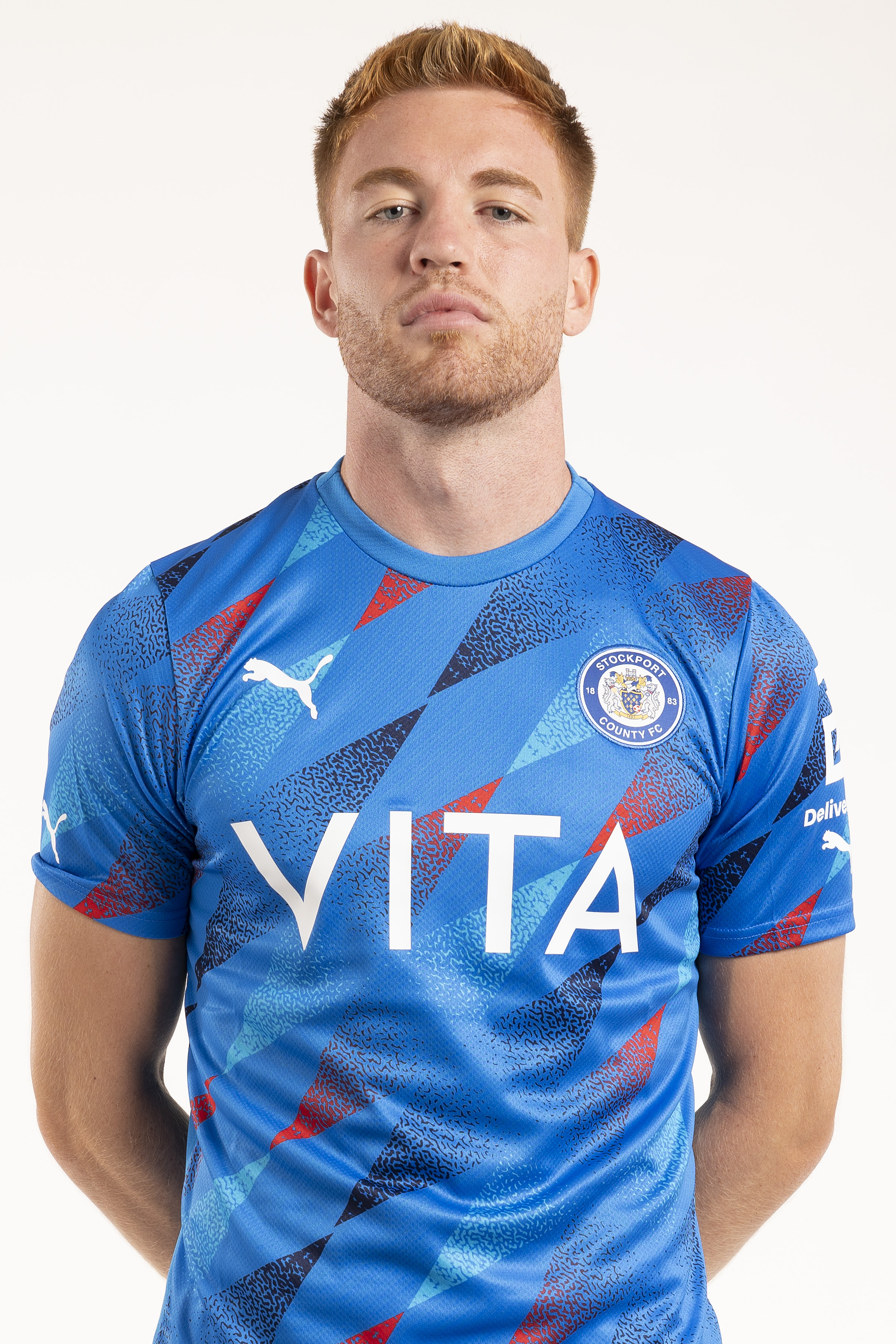
- Camps, Carlisle United

Personal information
- Full name: Callum Jason Noel Camps
- Date of birth: 30 November 1995 (age 30)
- Place of birth: Stalybridge, England
- Height: 1.80 m (5 ft 11 in)
- Position: Midfielder

Team information
- Current team: Carlisle United (on loan from Stockport County)
- Number: 32

Youth career
- –2013: Rochdale

Senior career*
| Years | Team | Apps | (Gls) |
| 2013–2020 | Rochdale | 201 | (25) |
| 2020–2022 | Fleetwood Town | 73 | (12) |
| 2022– | Stockport County | 100 | (9) |
| 2026– | → Carlisle United (loan) | 1 | (0) |

International career^{‡}
| 2012 | Northern Ireland U18 | | |
| 2015 | Northern Ireland U21 | 1 | (0) |
- * Club domestic league appearances and goals as of 11:27, 24 October 2026 (UTC) ‡ National team caps and goals as of 13:54, 14 November 2015 (UTC)

Callum Jason Noel Camps (born 30 November 1995) is a professional footballer who plays as a midfielder for National League club Carlisle United, on loan from EFL League One club Stockport County. Born in England, he has represented Northern Ireland internationally at youth levels.

== Club career ==
=== Rochdale ===
Camps came through the Rochdale youth team to make his senior debut on 13 April 2013, replacing Ashley Grimes 68 minutes into a 2–2 draw with Port Vale at Spotland. In September 2013, Camps signed his first professional contract, keeping him until 2016. At the end of the 2013–14 season, Camps was awarded Maureen Peacock Youth Player of the Year.

Camps made his full debut on 3 January 2015, in a 1–0 win over Nottingham Forest in the FA Cup. Weeks later on 31 January 2015, Camps scored his first Rochdale goal, in a 2–2 draw against Coventry City. His goal against Coventry City also earned him a nomination for Goal of the Season.

On 23 October 2015, Camps signed a one-year extension to his current contract with Rochdale having a one-year option to extend his contract.

On 28 June 2017, Camps signed another contract extension, keeping him at the club until the summer of 2020.

=== Fleetwood Town ===
On 1 August 2020, Camps signed a two-year contract at Fleetwood Town. He scored on his debut for the club in an EFL Trophy tie against Carlisle United.

On 5 May 2022, Camps was announced to be leaving the club upon the expiration of his contract.

=== Stockport County ===
On 4 July 2022, Camps joined the newly promoted to League Two club Stockport County, signing a three-year deal.

On 20 May 2025, the club announced it had offered the player a new contract.

on 20th July 2026 camps received a red card for aggressive conduct to the referee

=== Carlisle United ===
On 28 October 2026, Camps joined National League side Carlisle United on a two-month loan deal. Camps made his Carlisle debut the same day, coming off the bench in the 3-0 victory over Harrogate Town.

== International career ==
Camps won a call-up to the Northern Ireland under-18 squad in November 2012, having qualified for selection through his Northern Irish born grandmother.

Camps regularly represented the Northern Ireland Under-19 team and having represented the U18s and U19s, Camps was called up to represent the U20s in the Milk Cup finals.

== Career statistics ==
As of match played 6 October 2026

Appearances and goals by club, season and competition
| Club | Season | League | | | FA Cup | | League Cup | | Other | | Total | |
| Club | Season | Division | Apps | Goals | Apps | Goals | Apps | Goals | Apps | Goals | Apps | Goals |
|---|---|---|---|---|---|---|---|---|---|---|---|---|
| Rochdale | 2012–13 | League Two | 2 | 0 | 0 | 0 | 0 | 0 | 0 | 0 | 2 | 0 |
| Rochdale | 2013–14 | League Two | 0 | 0 | 1 | 0 | 0 | 0 | 0 | 0 | 1 | 0 |
| Rochdale | 2014–15 | League One | 12 | 1 | 2 | 0 | 0 | 0 | 1 (Note: Appearance(s) in Football League Trophy) | 0 | 15 | 1 |
| Rochdale | 2015–16 | League One | 32 | 5 | 2 | 0 | 1 | 0 | 1 | 0 | 36 | 5 |
| Rochdale | 2016–17 | League One | 44 | 8 | 5 | 1 | 0 | 0 | 2 (Note: Appearance(s) in EFL Trophy) | 0 | 51 | 9 |
| Rochdale | 2017–18 | League One | 42 | 2 | 6 | 1 | 1 | 1 | 4 | 0 | 53 | 4 |
| Rochdale | 2018–19 | League One | 41 | 3 | 1 | 0 | 2 | 0 | 0 | 0 | 44 | 3 |
| Rochdale | 2019–20 | League One | 28 | 6 | 6 | 0 | 3 | 2 | 1 | 0 | 38 | 8 |
| Rochdale | Total | | 201 | 25 | 23 | 2 | 7 | 3 | 9 | 0 | 240 | 30 |
| Fleetwood Town | 2020–21 | League One | 42 | 9 | 1 | 0 | 3 | 1 | 2 | 1 | 48 | 11 |
| Fleetwood Town | 2021–22 | League One | 31 | 3 | 1 | 0 | 1 | 0 | 1 | 0 | 34 | 3 |
| Fleetwood Town | Total | | 73 | 12 | 2 | 0 | 4 | 1 | 3 | 1 | 82 | 14 |
| Stockport County | 2022–23 | League Two | 34 | 4 | 3 | 0 | 2 | 0 | 4 (Note: One appearance in the EFL Trophy, three appearances in the EFL League Two play-offs) | 0 | 43 | 4 |
| Stockport County | 2023–24 | League Two | 29 | 4 | 2 | 0 | 0 | 0 | 2 | 0 | 33 | 4 |
| Stockport County | 2024–25 | League One | 27 | 1 | 2 | 0 | 1 | 0 | 3 (Note: One appearance in EFL League One play-offs; two appearances, one goal in EFL Trophy) | 1 | 33 | 2 |
| Stockport County | 2025–26 | League One | 10 | 0 | 1 | 0 | 0 | 0 | 0 | 0 | 11 | 0 |
| Stockport County | 2026–27 | League One | 0 | 0 | 0 | 0 | 0 | 0 | 2 | 1 | 2 | 1 |
| Stockport County | Total | | 100 | 9 | 8 | 0 | 3 | 0 | 11 | 2 | 122 | 11 |
| Career total | | | 374 | 46 | 33 | 2 | 14 | 4 | 23 | 3 | 444 | 55 |

== Honours ==
Stockport County

- EFL League Two: 2023–24
