= Jack Diamond (footballer, born 2000) =

English footballer (born 2000)

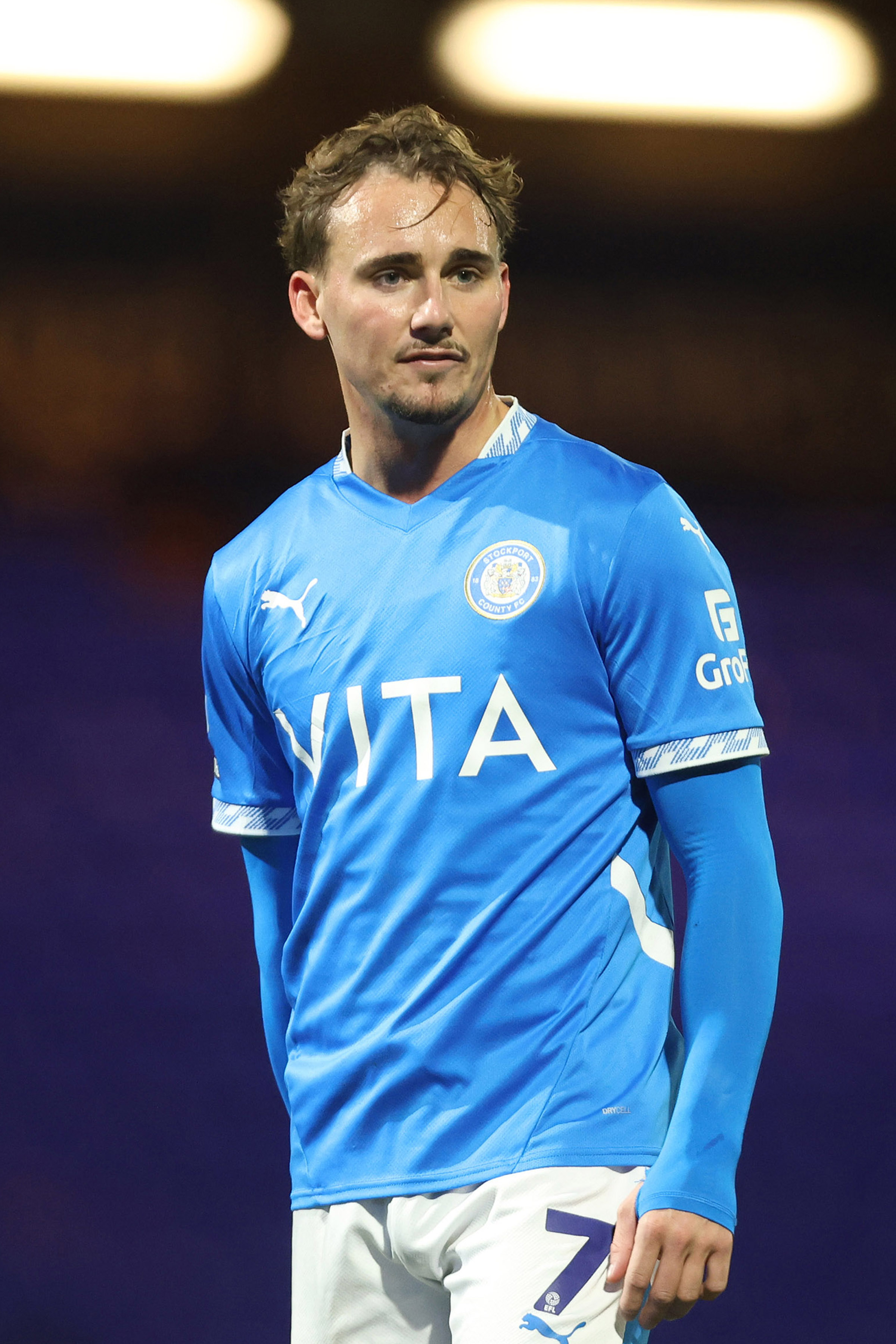
- Diamond playing for Stockport County

Personal information
- Full name: Jack Tyler Diamond
- Date of birth: 12 January 2000 (age 26)
- Place of birth: Gateshead, England
- Height: 1.75 m (5 ft 9 in)
- Position: Winger

Team information
- Current team: Stockport County
- Number: 7

Youth career
- –2018: Sunderland

Senior career*
Years	Team	Apps	(Gls)
2018–2024	Sunderland	28	(1)
2019–2020	→ Harrogate Town (loan)	27	(3)
2021–2022	→ Harrogate Town (loan)	17	(5)
2022	→ Harrogate Town (loan)	22	(8)
2022–2023	→ Lincoln City (loan)	31	(6)
2024	→ Carlisle United (loan)	16	(0)
2024–	Stockport County	93	(17)
- * Club domestic league appearances and goals as of 11:28, 22 November 2026 (UTC)

Jack Tyler Diamond (born 12 January 2000) is an English footballer who plays as a winger for EFL League One club Stockport County.

== Career ==
=== Sunderland ===
Born in Gateshead, Tyne and Wear, Diamond began his career with Sunderland, joining their academy at the age of 14. He made his senior debut on 9 October 2018, in the EFL Trophy, alongside Lee Connelly.

He moved on loan to Harrogate Town in September 2019. Later that month the club announced they wanted the loan to be extended. In November 2019 the loan was extended until the end of the season. That same month he said he was looking forward to playing for Harrogate in the FA Cup.

He scored his first goal for Sunderland in an EFL Trophy tie against Carlisle United on 6 October 2020.

He returned on loan to Harrogate Town on 31 August 2021. He was recalled by Sunderland on 7 January 2022. On 26 January he returned to Harrogate Town on loan for the rest of the season.

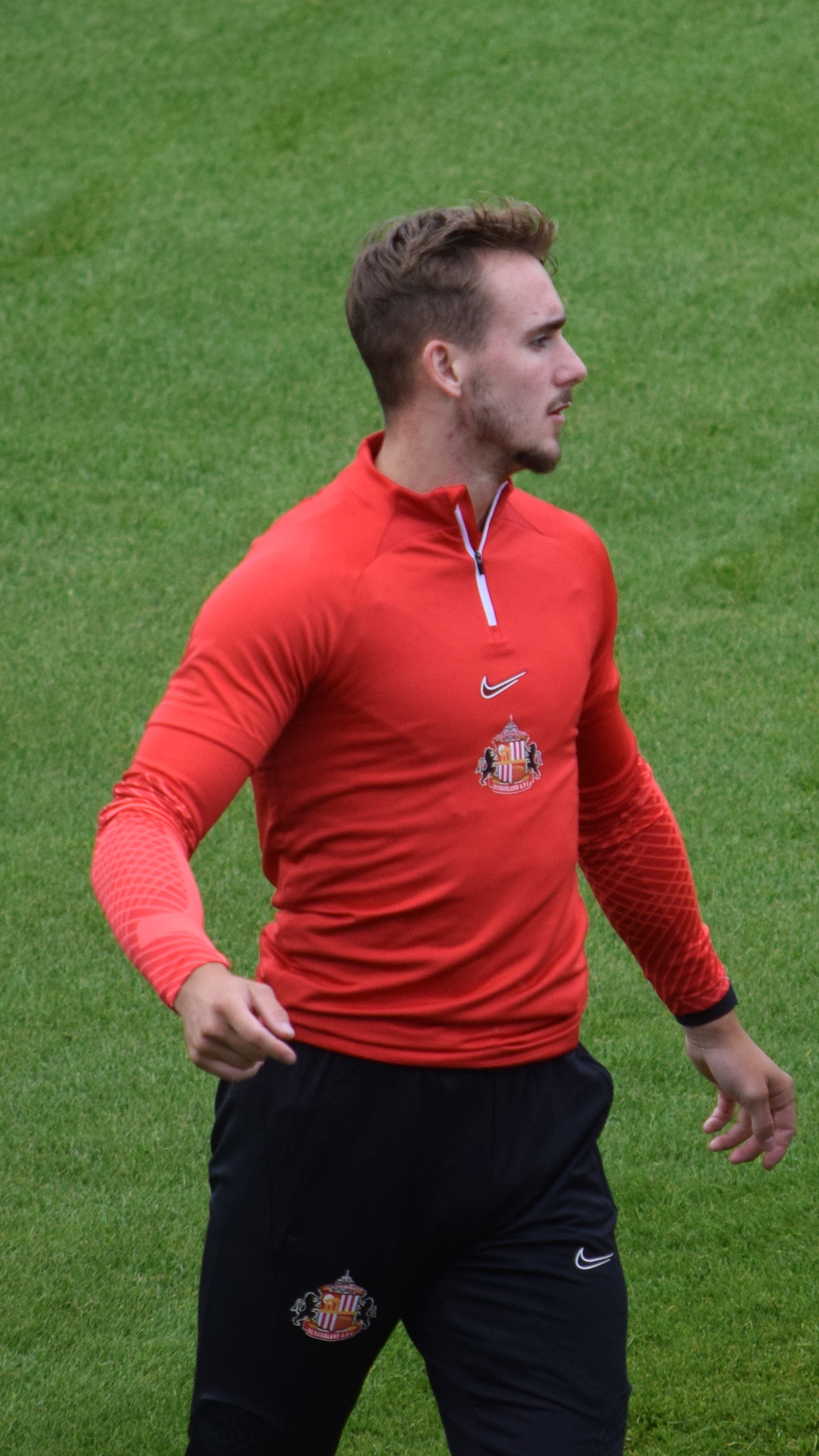
Diamond warming up for Sunderland in 2022

In August 2022 he signed for Lincoln City on loan for the rest of the season. He made his debut against Barnsley in the EFL Trophy on 30 August 2022. He would score his first goal in Imps colours, against Derby County from the penalty spot in a 2-0 win and in the following game against Bristol Rovers he would score his first career hattrick. This form saw him nominated for the EFL League One Player of the Month for September 2022.

On 30 March 2023, Diamond was charged with one count of rape and one count of sexual assault in relation to an incident alleged to have happened in Washington, Tyne and Wear in May 2022. Subsequently, his loan was terminated by Lincoln City and he was suspended by parent club, Sunderland.

In June 2023, he appeared in court and denied sexual assault. At the trial in January 2024, he was accused of rape, with the accuser saying she went to Diamond's house for "cuddles" when she was allegedly attacked by him. Diamond said that the accuser had initiated sex. On 8 January 2024, Diamond was cleared of the rape charges at trial with the jury taking seven minutes to determine. Sunderland confirmed the removal of Diamond's suspension, with a return to footballing activity.

On 25 January 2024, Diamond joined League One club Carlisle United on loan for the remainder of the season.

Diamond was released by Sunderland at the end of the 2023–24 season.

=== Stockport County ===
In June 2024 it was announced that he would sign for Stockport County on 1 July 2024.

== Career statistics ==
As of match played 21 November 2026

Appearances and goals by club, season and competition
Club	Season	League			National Cup		League Cup		Other		Total	
Club	Season	Division	Apps	Goals	Apps	Goals	Apps	Goals	Apps	Goals	Apps	Goals
Sunderland	2018–19	League One	0	0	0	0	0	0	3 (Note: Appearances in the EFL Trophy.)	0	3	0
Sunderland	2019–20	League One	0	0	0	0	0	0	0	0	0	0
Sunderland	2020–21	League One	24	1	1	0	0	0	10 (Note: 8 appearances in the EFL Trophy; 2 appearances in the play-offs.)	1	35	2
Sunderland	2021–22	League One	3	0	0	0	2	0	0	0	5	0
Sunderland	2022–23	Championship	1	0	0	0	1	0	0	0	2	0
Sunderland	2023–24	Championship	0	0	0	0	0	0	0	0	0	0
Sunderland	Total		28	1	1	0	3	0	13	1	45	2
Harrogate Town (loan)	2019–20	National League	27	3	2	0	0	0	2 (Note: Appearances in the National League play-offs.)	1	31	4
Harrogate Town (loan)	2021–22	League Two	39	13	2	1	0	0	4	0	45	14
Lincoln City (loan)	2022–23	League One	31	6	0	0	0	0	5	2	36	8
Carlisle United (loan)	2023–24	League One	16	0	0	0	0	0	0	0	16	0
Stockport County	2024–25	League One	33	5	2	0	0	0	5 (Note: Four appearances in the EFL Trophy, one appearance in the play-offs)	0	40	5
Stockport County	2025–26	League One	45	6	2	1	2	0	9 (Note: Six appearances in the EFL Trophy, three appearances in the play-offs)	1	58	8
Stockport County	2026–27	League One	15	6	1	0	1	0	0	0	17	6
Stockport County	Total		93	17	5	1	3	0	14	1	115	19
Career total			234	40	10	2	6	0	38	5	288	47

== Honours ==
Harrogate Town

- National League play-offs: 2020

Sunderland

- EFL Trophy: 2020–21

Stockport County

- EFL Trophy runner-up: 2025–26
