= Jason Adigun =

English footballer (born 2003)

Personal information
- Full name: Jason David Abiodun Dayo Adigun
- Date of birth: 2 December 2003 (age 22)
- Place of birth: Newham, England
- Height: 1.78 m (5 ft 10 in)
- Position: Attacking midfielder

Team information
- Current team: Stockport County
- Number: 20

Youth career
- Dagenham & Redbridge
- Charlton Athletic

Senior career*
Years	Team	Apps	(Gls)
2022–2024	Charlton Athletic	0	(0)
2024	→ Welling United (loan)	17	(2)
2024–2025	Dagenham & Redbridge	1	(0)
2024	→ Tonbridge Angels (loan)	5	(1)
2025	→ Eastbourne Borough (loan)	19	(5)
2025	Kidderminster Harriers	6	(0)
2025–2026	Chelmsford City	34	(7)
2026–	Stockport County	10	(0)
- * Club domestic league appearances and goals as of 23:56, 25 October 2026 (UTC)

Jason David Abiodun Dayo Adigun (born 2 December 2003) is an English professional footballer who plays as an attacking midfielder for EFL League One club Stockport County.

== Career ==
Adigun began his career in the academy at Dagenham & Redbridge, before moving to Charlton Athletic at the age of 12. In July 2022, Adigun signed his first professional contract with Charlton. On 3 February 2024, Adigun signed for National League South side Welling United on loan.

On 24 August 2024, Adigun joined Dagenham & Redbridge, signing a two-year contract at the club. On 13 September 2024, Adigun signed for Tonbridge Angels on loan. On 17 January 2025, Adigun was loaned out to Eastbourne Borough.

On 1 July 2025, Adigun signed for National League North outfit Kidderminster Harriers.

On 10 October 2025, Chelmsford City announced the signing of Adigun, following his departure from Kidderminster.

On 7 July 2026, Adigun joined League One side Stockport County for an undisclosed fee. On 8 August 2026, Adigun made his debut for Stockport, coming on in the 77th minute in the EFL Cup against Doncaster Rovers.

== Personal life ==
Adigun is of Nigerian descent and is cousins with England international Rio Ngumoha.
