= Benoný Breki Andrésson =

Icelandic footballer (born 2005)

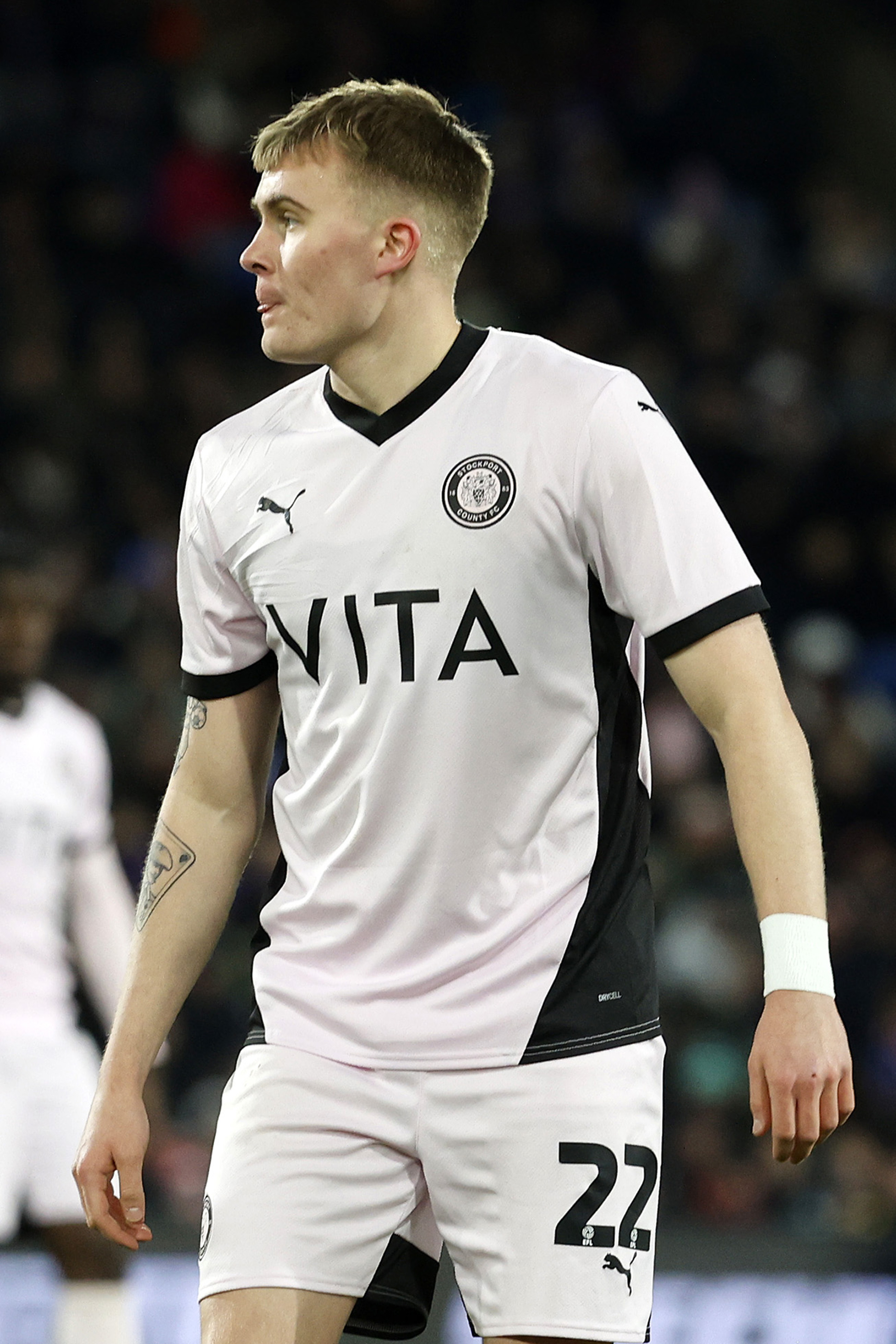
- Andrésson playing for Stockport County in 2025

Personal information
- Full name: Benoný Breki Andrésson
- Date of birth: 3 August 2005 (age 21)
- Place of birth: Iceland
- Position: Striker

Team information
- Current team: Stockport County
- Number: 9

Youth career
- –2019: Grótta
- 2019–2021: Breiðablik
- 2021–2023: Bologna

Senior career*
Years	Team	Apps	(Gls)
2023–2025	KR	51	(30)
2025–	Stockport County	35	(6)

International career^{‡}
2021	Iceland U17	5	(1)
2023	Iceland U19	8	(3)
2023–	Iceland U21	6	(2)
2026–	Iceland	1	(0)
- * Club domestic league appearances and goals as of 00:25, 25 October 2026 (UTC) ‡ National team caps and goals as of 3 June 2026

Benoný Breki Andrésson (born 3 August 2005) is an Icelandic professional footballer who plays as a striker for EFL League One club Stockport County and the Iceland national team.

== Club career ==
=== Early career ===
Benoný born in Iceland to Icelandic and Malagasy roots,he joined Breiðablik as a youth player in 2019, having previously played for Grótta. He played with Breiðablik's U-19 team prior to joining Italian side Bologna in 2021.

=== KR ===
Benoný moved back to the Icelandic league to join KR in 2023. He scored nine league goals in his first season with KR. In October 2024, he scored 5 goals in a 7–0 victory against HK in the final round of matches of the 2024 Besta deild karla to set a new league record of 21 goals in a season. That month, he was also voted the most promising player in the league by his fellow players.

=== Stockport County ===
In December 2024 it was announced that Benoný would join English club Stockport County on 1 January 2025. He was described as an "emerging talent signing" by Stockport director of football Simon Wilson.

He made his debut for Stockport County, as a second-half substitute in a 1–0 away loss in the FA Cup third round against Premier League club Crystal Palace on 12 January 2025. He scored his first goals for the club on 1 March 2025, when he scored a second-half brace, again as a substitute, in a 2–1 home win in League One against Blackpool. He scored again four days later to make it three in two games, as he rescued a draw with a late equaliser for the club, as they finished 1–1 away in the league at Northampton Town.

== International career ==
An Icelandic youth international, he made his debut for the Iceland national under-21 football team on 17 October 2023 against Lithuania U21 in a 1–0 win.

== Career statistics ==
=== Club ===
As of match played 24 October 2026

Appearances and goals by club, season and competition
Club	Season	League			National cup (Note: Includes Icelandic Cup, FA Cup)		League cup (Note: Includes Icelandic League Cup, EFL Cup)		Other		Total	
Club	Season	Division	Apps	Goals	Apps	Goals	Apps	Goals	Apps	Goals	Apps	Goals
KR	2023	Besta deild karla	25	9	3	1	—		—		28	10
KR	2024	Besta deild karla	26	21	2	4	—		—		28	25
KR	Total		51	30	5	5	—		—		56	35
Stockport County	2024–25	League One	11	4	1	0	0	0	1 (Note: Appearance in League One play-offs)	0	13	4
Stockport County	2025–26	League One	17	2	0	0	1	0	5 (Note: Two appearances and one goal in EFL Trophy, three appearances in League One play-offs)	1	23	3
Stockport County	2026–27	League One	7	0	0	0	1	0	0	0	8	0
Stockport County	Total		35	6	1	0	2	0	6	1	44	7
Career total			86	36	6	5	2	0	6	1	100	42
