= Christy Grogan =

English association football player (born 2005)

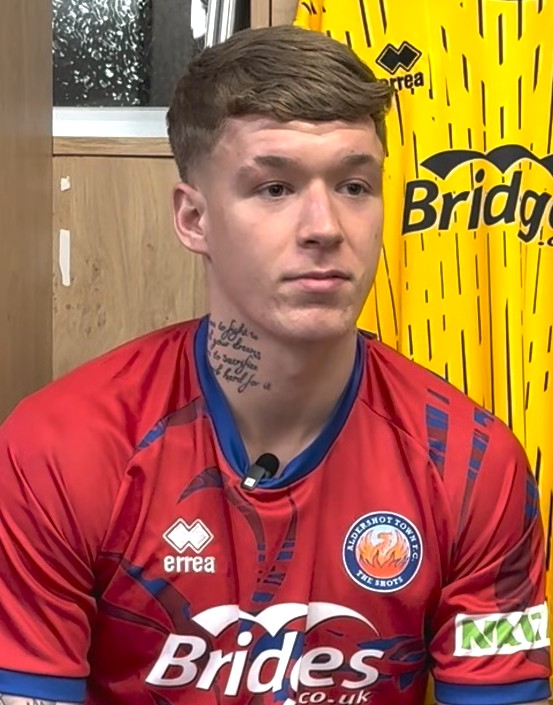
- Grogan in December 2025

Personal information
- Full name: Christy James Grogan
- Date of birth: 27 October 2005 (age 21)
- Place of birth: Manchester, England
- Height: 1.94 m (6 ft 4 1/2 in)
- Position: Defender

Team information
- Current team: Derry City
- Number: 25

Youth career
- 2015–2024: Stoke City

Senior career*
Years	Team	Apps	(Gls)
2024–2025	Stoke City	0	(0)
2024–2025	→ Wythenshawe Town (loan)	6	(1)
2025–2026	Stockport County	2	(0)
2025–2026	→ Aldershot Town (loan)	15	(0)
2026–	Derry City	1	(0)

International career^{‡}
2022	Republic of Ireland U18	1	(0)
- * Club domestic league appearances and goals as of 16:17, 9 November 2026 (UTC) ‡ National team caps and goals as of 15:46, 12 December 2025 (UTC)

Christy James Grogan (born 27 October 2005) is a professional footballer who plays as a defender for League of Ireland Premier Division club Derry City. Born in England, he has represented Republic of Ireland at under-18 level.

== Club career ==
=== Early career ===
Grogan began his career with Stoke City, signing his first professional deal in July 2024. He gained his initial exposure to senior football during a loan spell with Northern Premier League Division One West side Wythenshawe Town from December 2024 to January 2025. Grogan departed Stoke City at the conclusion of his contract in June 2025, ending a decade-long association with the club.

=== Stockport County ===
On 29 May 2025, Grogan agreed to join League One outfit Stockport County on a one-year contract following his release from Stoke City. He made his debut for the club on 2 September 2025 in an EFL Trophy match against Wolverhampton Wanderers U21s, playing 45 minutes in a 5–3 win. Two months later, he featured once more in the competition during a 1–1 draw with Wigan Athletic.

On 5 December 2025, Grogan joined National League side, Aldershot Town for the remainder of the 2025–26 campaign. He was recalled in April 2026 amid an injury crisis at his parent club.

=== Derry City ===
On 5 July 2026, Grogan signed for League of Ireland Premier Division club Derry City for an undisclosed fee. He made his debut for the club on 9 July 2026 in a 3–2 defeat away to CSKA Sofia in the UEFA Europa League. On 8 November 2026, he was an unused substitute in the 2026 FAI Cup final as his side defeated Waterford 1–0 at the Aviva Stadium.

== International career ==
Born in Manchester, Grogan is of Irish descent and made one appearance for Republic of Ireland at under-18 level in 2022.

== Career statistics ==
As of match played 30 October 2026

Appearances and goals by club, season and competition
Club	Season	League			National Cup (Note: Includes FA Cup & FAI Cup)		League Cup (Note: Includes EFL Cup & National League Cup)		Other		Total	
Club	Season	Division	Apps	Goals	Apps	Goals	Apps	Goals	Apps	Goals	Apps	Goals
Stoke City	2024–25	Championship	0	0	0	0	0	0	—		0	0
Wythenshawe Town (loan)	2024–25	Northern Premier League Division One West	6	1	—		—		—		6	1
Stockport County	2025–26	League One	2	0	0	0	0	0	2 (Note: Appearance(s) in EFL Trophy)	0	4	0
Aldershot Town (loan)	2025–26	National League	15	0	—		1	0	1 (Note: Appearance(s) in FA Trophy)	0	17	0
Derry City	2026	LOI Premier Division	1	0	1	0	—		2 (Note: Appearance(s) in UEFA Europa League)	0	4	0
Career total			24	1	1	0	1	0	5	0	31	1

== Honours ==
Derry City

- FAI Cup: 2026
