= 2022–23 EFL League Two =

EFL League Two
- Season: 2022–23
- Dates: 30 July 2022 – 8 May 2023
- Champions: Leyton Orient
- Promoted: Leyton Orient; Stevenage; Northampton Town; Carlisle United
- Relegated: Hartlepool United; Rochdale
- Matches: 552
- Goals: 1,294 (2.34 per match)
- Top goalscorer: Andy Cook (28 goals)
- Biggest home win: Stevenage 5–0 Barrow (2 December 2022); Swindon Town 5–0 Grimsby Town (14 January 2023)
- Biggest away win: Hartlepool United 0–5; Stockport County (3 December 2022)
- Highest scoring: Rochdale 4–4; Swindon Town (18 March 2023)
- Total attendance: 2,999,174
- Average attendance: 5,712
- All statistics correct as of 15 May 2023.

The 2022–23 EFL League Two (referred to as the Sky Bet League Two for sponsorship reasons) was the 19th season of the Football League Two under its current title and the 31st season under its current league division format. It began on 30 July 2022.

== Team changes ==
The following teams have changed division since the 2021–22 season:

=== To League Two ===
Promoted from National League

- Stockport County
- Grimsby Town

Relegated from League One

- Gillingham
- Doncaster Rovers
- AFC Wimbledon
- Crewe Alexandra

=== From League Two ===
Promoted to League One

- Forest Green Rovers
- Exeter City
- Bristol Rovers
- Port Vale

Relegated to National League

- Oldham Athletic
- Scunthorpe United

== Stadiums ==
Locations of the 2022–23 EFL League Two teams
Greater Manchester League Two football clubs
London League Two football clubs

| Team | Location | Stadium | Capacity |
|---|---|---|---|
| AFC Wimbledon | London (Wimbledon) | Plough Lane | 9,369 |
| Barrow | Barrow-in-Furness | Holker Street | 5,045 |
| Bradford City | Bradford | Valley Parade | 25,126 |
| Carlisle United | Carlisle | Brunton Park | 17,949 |
| Colchester United | Colchester | Colchester Community Stadium | 10,105 |
| Crawley Town | Crawley | Broadfield Stadium | 5,996 |
| Crewe Alexandra | Crewe | Gresty Road | 10,153 |
| Doncaster Rovers | Doncaster | Keepmoat Stadium | 15,231 |
| Gillingham | Gillingham | Priestfield Stadium | 11,582 |
| Grimsby Town | Cleethorpes | Blundell Park | 9,052 |
| Harrogate Town | Harrogate | Wetherby Road | 5,000 |
| Hartlepool United | Hartlepool | Victoria Park | 7,856 |
| Leyton Orient | London (Leyton) | Brisbane Road | 9,271 |
| Mansfield Town | Mansfield | Field Mill | 9,186 |
| Newport County | Newport | Rodney Parade | 7,850 |
| Northampton Town | Northampton | Sixfields Stadium | 7,798 |
| Rochdale | Rochdale | Spotland Stadium | 10,000 |
| Salford City | Salford | Moor Lane | 5,108 |
| Stevenage | Stevenage | Broadhall Way | 7,300 |
| Stockport County | Stockport | Edgeley Park | 10,852 |
| Sutton United | London (Sutton) | Gander Green Lane | 5,032 |
| Swindon Town | Swindon | County Ground | 15,728 |
| Tranmere Rovers | Birkenhead | Prenton Park | 16,789 |
| Walsall | Walsall | Bescot Stadium | 11,300 |

== Personnel and sponsoring ==
| Team | Manager | Captain | Kit manufacturer | Sponsor |
|---|---|---|---|---|
| AFC Wimbledon | (England) Johnnie Jackson | (England) Alex Woodyard | (Denmark) Hummel | Sports Interactive |
| Barrow | (England) Pete Wild | (Republic of Ireland) Niall Canavan | (Germany) Puma | JF Hornby & Co. |
| Bradford City | (Wales) Mark Hughes | (England) Richie Smallwood | (Italy) Macron | JCT600 |
| Carlisle United | (England) Paul Simpson | (England) Morgan Feeney | (Italy) Erreà | Bimson Haulage |
| Colchester United | (England) Ben Garner | (New Zealand) Tommy Smith | (Italy) Macron | Workhorse Group |
| Crawley Town | (England) Scott Lindsey | (England) Ben Gladwin | (Germany) Adidas | The People's Pension |
| Crewe Alexandra | (England) Lee Bell | (England) Luke Offord | (Thailand) FBT | Mornflake |
| Doncaster Rovers | (Northern Ireland) Grant McCann | (England) Tom Anderson | (England) Elite Pro Sports | Eco-Power Group |
| Gillingham | (England) Neil Harris | (England) Stuart O'Keefe | (Italy) Macron | MEMS Power Generation |
| Grimsby Town | (England) Paul Hurst | (England) Luke Waterfall | (Italy) Macron | myenergi |
| Harrogate Town | (England) Simon Weaver | (England) Josh Falkingham | (United States) New Balance | Strata |
| Hartlepool United | (England) John Askey | (England) Nicky Featherstone | (Italy) Erreà | Suit Direct |
| Leyton Orient | (England) Richie Wellens | (England) Darren Pratley | (Germany) Puma | Multiple charities (Note: Tommy Club (Home), Haven House Children's Hospice (Away), and Mind (Third).) |
| Mansfield Town | (England) Nigel Clough | (England) Ollie Clarke | (England) Surridge Sports | One Call Insurance |
| Newport County | (Republic of Ireland) Graham Coughlan | (England) Mickey Demetriou | (Denmark) Hummel | Pure Vans |
| Northampton Town | (Australia) Jon Brady | (England) Jon Guthrie | (Denmark) Hummel | University of Northampton |
| Rochdale | (Scotland) Jimmy McNulty (interim) | (England) Ethan Ebanks-Landell | (Italy) Erreà | Crown Oil Ltd |
| Salford City | (England) Neil Wood | (England) Ashley Eastham | (England) Castore | TalkTalk |
| Stevenage | (Scotland) Steve Evans | (England) Carl Piergianni | (Italy) Macron | Prime Gaming |
| Stockport County | (England) Dave Challinor | (Republic of Ireland) Paddy Madden | (Germany) Puma | VITA Group |
| Sutton United | (England) Matt Gray | (England) Craig Eastmond | (Republic of Ireland) O'Neills | Angel Plastics |
| Swindon Town | (Wales) Michael Flynn | (England) Charlie Austin | (Germany) Puma | First City Nursing and Care |
| Tranmere Rovers | (England) Ian Dawes | (England) Kane Hemmings | (Indonesia) Mills | Essar |
| Walsall | (England) Mat Sadler | (Montserrat) Donervon Daniels | (Italy) Erreà | Poundland |

== Managerial changes ==
| Team | Outgoing manager | Manner of departure | Date of vacancy | Position in the table | Incoming manager | Date of appointment |
|---|---|---|---|---|---|---|
| AFC Wimbledon | (Wales) Mark Bowen | End of contract | 7 May 2022 | Pre-season | (England) Johnnie Jackson | 16 May 2022 |
| Hartlepool United | (England) Michael Nelson | End of caretaker spell | 8 May 2022 | Pre-season | (Scotland) Paul Hartley | 3 June 2022 |
| Crawley Town | (England) Lewis Young | End of caretaker spell | 8 May 2022 | Pre-season | (Seychelles) Kevin Betsy | 6 June 2022 |
| Barrow | (England) Phil Brown | End of contract | 12 May 2022 | Pre-season | (England) Pete Wild | 27 May 2022 |
| Salford City | (England) Gary Bowyer | Sacked | 17 May 2022 | Pre-season | (England) Neil Wood | 20 May 2022 |
| Swindon Town | (England) Ben Garner | Signed by Charlton Athletic | 8 June 2022 | Pre-season | (England) Scott Lindsey | 20 June 2022 |
| Rochdale | (Scotland) Robbie Stockdale | Sacked | 18 August 2022 | 24th | (England) Jim Bentley | 29 August 2022 |
| Hartlepool United | (Scotland) Paul Hartley | Sacked | 18 September 2022 | 23rd | (England) Keith Curle | 18 September 2022 |
| Colchester United | (England) Wayne Brown | Sacked | 18 September 2022 | 21st | (England) Matt Bloomfield | 30 September 2022 |
| Crawley Town | (Seychelles) Kevin Betsy | Sacked | 9 October 2022 | 24th | (England) Matthew Etherington | 27 November 2022 |
| Newport County | (Wales) James Rowberry | Sacked | 10 October 2022 | 18th | (Republic of Ireland) Graham Coughlan | 20 October 2022 |
| Doncaster Rovers | (England) Gary McSheffrey | Sacked | 17 October 2022 | 12th | (England) Danny Schofield | 20 October 2022 |
| Crewe Alexandra | (England) Alex Morris | Demoted to assistant manager | 4 November 2022 | 16th | (England) Lee Bell (Note: Bell was originally appointed interim manager before being given the role permanently on 1 December 2022) | 4 November 2022 |
| Crawley Town | (England) Matthew Etherington | Mutual Consent | 29 December 2022 | 20th | (England) Scott Lindsey | 11 January 2023 |
| Swindon Town | (England) Scott Lindsey | Signed by Crawley Town | 11 January 2023 | 8th | (England) Jody Morris | 31 January 2023 |
| Colchester United | (England) Matt Bloomfield | Signed by Wycombe Wanderers | 21 February 2023 | 18th | (England) Ben Garner | 2 March 2023 |
| Hartlepool United | (England) Keith Curle | Sacked | 22 February 2023 | 22nd | (England) John Askey | 23 February 2023 |
| Tranmere Rovers | (Scotland) Micky Mellon | Sacked | 19 March 2023 | 14th | (England) Ian Dawes (Note: Dawes was originally appointed interim manager before being given the role permanently on 4 May 2023) | 4 May 2023 |
| Rochdale | (England) Jim Bentley | Sacked | 27 March 2023 | 24th | (Scotland) Jimmy McNulty (interim) | 27 March 2023 |
| Walsall | (Wales) Michael Flynn | Sacked | 19 April 2023 | 15th | (England) Mat Sadler (interim) | 19 April 2023 |
| Swindon Town | (England) Jody Morris | Sacked | 1 May 2023 | 10th | (England) Steve Mildenhall and (Republic of Ireland) Gavin Gunning (Interim) | 1 May 2023 |

== League table ==
| Pos | Team | Pld | W | D | L | GF | GA | GD | Pts | Promotion, qualification or relegation |
|---|---|---|---|---|---|---|---|---|---|---|
| 1 | Leyton Orient (C, P) | 46 | 26 | 13 | 7 | 61 | 34 | +27 | 91 | Promotion to EFL League One |
| 2 | Stevenage (P) | 46 | 24 | 13 | 9 | 61 | 39 | +22 | 85 | Promotion to EFL League One |
| 3 | Northampton Town (P) | 46 | 23 | 14 | 9 | 62 | 42 | +20 | 83 | Promotion to EFL League One |
| 4 | Stockport County | 46 | 22 | 13 | 11 | 65 | 37 | +28 | 79 | Qualification for League Two play-offs |
| 5 | Carlisle United (O, P) | 46 | 20 | 16 | 10 | 66 | 43 | +23 | 76 | Qualification for League Two play-offs |
| 6 | Bradford City | 46 | 20 | 16 | 10 | 61 | 43 | +18 | 76 | Qualification for League Two play-offs |
| 7 | Salford City | 46 | 22 | 9 | 15 | 72 | 54 | +18 | 75 | Qualification for League Two play-offs |
| 8 | Mansfield Town | 46 | 21 | 12 | 13 | 72 | 55 | +17 | 75 | |
| 9 | Barrow | 46 | 18 | 8 | 20 | 47 | 53 | −6 | 62 | |
| 10 | Swindon Town | 46 | 16 | 13 | 17 | 61 | 55 | +6 | 61 | |
| 11 | Grimsby Town | 46 | 16 | 13 | 17 | 49 | 56 | −7 | 61 | |
| 12 | Tranmere Rovers | 46 | 15 | 13 | 18 | 45 | 48 | −3 | 58 | |
| 13 | Crewe Alexandra | 46 | 14 | 16 | 16 | 48 | 60 | −12 | 58 | |
| 14 | Sutton United | 46 | 15 | 13 | 18 | 46 | 58 | −12 | 58 | |
| 15 | Newport County | 46 | 14 | 15 | 17 | 53 | 56 | −3 | 57 | |
| 16 | Walsall | 46 | 12 | 19 | 15 | 46 | 49 | −3 | 55 | |
| 17 | Gillingham | 46 | 14 | 13 | 19 | 36 | 49 | −13 | 55 | |
| 18 | Doncaster Rovers | 46 | 16 | 7 | 23 | 46 | 65 | −19 | 55 | |
| 19 | Harrogate Town | 46 | 12 | 16 | 18 | 59 | 68 | −9 | 52 | |
| 20 | Colchester United | 46 | 12 | 13 | 21 | 44 | 51 | −7 | 49 | |
| 21 | AFC Wimbledon | 46 | 11 | 15 | 20 | 48 | 60 | −12 | 48 | |
| 22 | Crawley Town | 46 | 11 | 13 | 22 | 48 | 71 | −23 | 46 | |
| 23 | Hartlepool United (R) | 46 | 9 | 16 | 21 | 52 | 78 | −26 | 43 | Relegation to National League |
| 24 | Rochdale (R) | 46 | 9 | 11 | 26 | 46 | 70 | −24 | 38 | Relegation to National League |

Source: EFL Official Website
Rules for classification: 1) Points; 2) Goal difference; 3) Number of goals scored; 4) Head-to-head results; 5) Wins; 6) Away goals; 7) Penalty points (sec 9.5); 8) 12-point sending off offences
(C) Champions; (O) Play-off winners; (P) Promoted; (R) Relegated

== Play-offs ==
Semi-finals
7 | Salford City | 1 | 1 | 2 (1)
4 | Stockport County (p) | 0 | 2 | 2 (3)
6 | Bradford City | 1 | 1 | 2
5 | Carlisle United | 0 | 3 | 3

Final
4 | Stockport County | 1 (4)
5 | Carlisle United (p) | 1 (5)

=== Semi-Finals ===
First leg

13 May 2023
19:45

| Salford City | 1–0 | Stockport County |
|---|---|---|
| Smith 17' | Report |

Moor Lane, Salford
Attendance: 3,923
Referee: Tom Nield
14 May 2023
19:00

| Bradford City | 1–0 | Carlisle United |
|---|---|---|
| Walker 18' | Report |

Valley Parade, Bradford
Attendance: 20,575
Referee: Ross Joyce

Second leg

20 May 2023
12:30

| Stockport County | 2–1 (a.e.t.) | Salford City |
|---|---|---|
| Olaofe 68'; Stretton 115' | Report | Mallan 112' |
Penalties
| Madden (penalty scored); Croasdale (penalty missed); Collar (penalty scored); Sarcevic (penalty scored) | 3–1 | (penalty missed) Lund; (penalty missed) Mariappa; (penalty scored) Barry; (penalty missed) Mallen |

Edgeley Park, Stockport
Attendance: 10,023
Referee: Ben Toner

2–2 on Aggregate. Stockport County wins 3–1 on penalties

20 May 2023
15:00

| Carlisle United | 3–1 (a.e.t.) | Bradford City |
|---|---|---|
| Halliday 21' (o.g.); Guy 98'; Barclay 112' | Report | Derbyshire 106' |

Brunton Park, Carlisle
Attendance: 15,401
Referee: Simon Mather

Carlisle United won 3–2 on Aggregate.

=== Final ===
28 May 2023
13:30 BST

| Stockport County | 1–1 (a.e.t.) | Carlisle United |
|---|---|---|
| Mellish 34' (o.g.) | Report | Patrick 84' |
Penalties
| Lemonheigh-Evans (penalty scored); Rydel (penalty missed); Hippolyte (penalty scored); Stretton (penalty scored); Collar (penalty scored) | 4–5 | (penalty scored) Dennis; (penalty scored) Mellish; (penalty scored) Edmondson; (penalty scored) Moxon; (penalty scored) Charters |

Wembley Stadium, London
Attendance: 34,004
Referee: Tom Nield

== Results ==
| Home \ Away | WIM | BAR | BRA | CAR | COL | CRA | CRE | DON | GIL | GRI | HAR | HTL | LEY | MAN | NEW | NOR | ROC | SAL | STE | STO | SUT | SWI | TRA | WAL |
|---|---|---|---|---|---|---|---|---|---|---|---|---|---|---|---|---|---|---|---|---|---|---|---|---|
| AFC Wimbledon | — | 0–1 | 0–0 | 0–0 | 2–1 | 0–1 | 1–1 | 2–2 | 2–0 | 1–0 | 3–2 | 2–2 | 2–0 | 1–3 | 1–1 | 0–2 | 0–1 | 2–3 | 2–3 | 1–0 | 0–1 | 1–5 | 1–1 | 2–0 |
| Barrow | 2–1 | — | 3–2 | 0–1 | 3–1 | 4–0 | 3–0 | 2–0 | 2–1 | 1–0 | 1–0 | 3–1 | 0–2 | 0–1 | 0–1 | 0–2 | 0–0 | 1–1 | 0–1 | 1–0 | 0–0 | 0–1 | 1–2 | 2–1 |
| Bradford City | 2–2 | 0–1 | — | 0–0 | 2–0 | 1–1 | 0–0 | 0–0 | 2–2 | 3–2 | 1–0 | 2–2 | 1–1 | 1–1 | 2–0 | 1–3 | 1–2 | 3–2 | 3–0 | 0–1 | 3–1 | 1–1 | 2–0 | 2–1 |
| Carlisle United | 2–1 | 5–1 | 1–0 | — | 1–0 | 1–0 | 0–0 | 3–0 | 1–0 | 2–0 | 0–1 | 3–1 | 2–3 | 0–4 | 2–0 | 0–0 | 3–3 | 2–3 | 0–0 | 2–2 | 1–1 | 1–1 | 2–0 | 0–0 |
| Colchester United | 1–2 | 1–1 | 1–0 | 1–1 | — | 2–2 | 4–0 | 3–0 | 0–2 | 0–1 | 2–1 | 1–1 | 1–3 | 0–2 | 0–0 | 0–1 | 0–1 | 1–1 | 1–1 | 0–1 | 4–1 | 1–0 | 1–1 | 0–0 |
| Crawley Town | 0–2 | 1–0 | 0–0 | 2–5 | 0–0 | — | 2–2 | 1–1 | 0–0 | 1–1 | 3–1 | 0–2 | 0–1 | 3–2 | 2–1 | 2–3 | 2–0 | 3–2 | 1–2 | 3–2 | 1–2 | 2–0 | 2–1 | 0–0 |
| Crewe Alexandra | 0–0 | 3–0 | 3–2 | 0–3 | 1–0 | 1–0 | — | 1–1 | 1–1 | 0–3 | 3–0 | 2–0 | 0–2 | 1–2 | 1–2 | 2–2 | 1–1 | 4–3 | 1–2 | 1–1 | 1–0 | 2–1 | 1–0 | 2–0 |
| Doncaster Rovers | 2–1 | 1–0 | 0–1 | 2–1 | 1–0 | 4–1 | 0–2 | — | 1–0 | 1–2 | 0–2 | 0–1 | 1–1 | 1–3 | 1–3 | 0–2 | 4–3 | 2–1 | 0–1 | 2–1 | 2–1 | 0–1 | 2–0 | 0–2 |
| Gillingham | 2–1 | 1–1 | 0–2 | 1–0 | 0–1 | 1–0 | 2–1 | 1–0 | — | 2–1 | 0–2 | 2–0 | 2–0 | 0–2 | 1–2 | 0–2 | 1–0 | 0–3 | 1–1 | 1–1 | 1–0 | 0–0 | 2–0 | 0–0 |
| Grimsby Town | 1–0 | 1–0 | 0–0 | 1–2 | 0–1 | 3–0 | 2–0 | 1–3 | 1–1 | — | 0–0 | 1–4 | 2–2 | 1–1 | 1–1 | 1–1 | 1–0 | 1–4 | 1–1 | 1–0 | 0–0 | 1–2 | 2–1 | 1–1 |
| Harrogate Town | 2–2 | 1–0 | 1–2 | 3–3 | 1–3 | 0–0 | 2–2 | 2–2 | 0–0 | 3–2 | — | 2–1 | 0–2 | 3–0 | 0–4 | 1–1 | 1–1 | 0–1 | 1–1 | 1–3 | 0–1 | 3–0 | 1–1 | 3–0 |
| Hartlepool United | 0–0 | 3–1 | 1–3 | 1–3 | 1–2 | 0–2 | 1–1 | 2–1 | 0–0 | 2–1 | 3–3 | — | 1–1 | 1–2 | 0–1 | 1–1 | 2–0 | 0–2 | 1–1 | 0–5 | 2–2 | 2–1 | 0–0 | 3–3 |
| Leyton Orient | 1–0 | 0–0 | 3–0 | 1–0 | 2–2 | 1–0 | 2–0 | 1–0 | 2–0 | 2–0 | 2–2 | 4–2 | — | 1–0 | 1–2 | 0–0 | 2–1 | 1–0 | 0–0 | 0–3 | 2–0 | 1–1 | 2–0 | 1–0 |
| Mansfield Town | 5–2 | 2–3 | 1–2 | 0–0 | 2–1 | 4–1 | 1–1 | 4–1 | 2–0 | 0–0 | 1–2 | 2–2 | 1–2 | — | 0–0 | 1–1 | 1–1 | 2–5 | 1–0 | 2–1 | 0–0 | 2–5 | 1–0 | 2–1 |
| Newport County | 1–1 | 0–2 | 1–1 | 1–1 | 1–0 | 2–2 | 2–2 | 0–1 | 2–0 | 0–2 | 2–3 | 2–0 | 0–0 | 1–2 | — | 3–0 | 0–1 | 2–3 | 2–2 | 1–2 | 0–2 | 2–1 | 2–1 | 0–1 |
| Northampton Town | 0–0 | 3–1 | 1–2 | 2–1 | 3–2 | 1–0 | 1–0 | 0–1 | 2–1 | 1–2 | 3–1 | 2–1 | 1–0 | 1–0 | 1–1 | — | 3–0 | 0–1 | 1–1 | 2–1 | 2–2 | 1–2 | 0–0 | 0–0 |
| Rochdale | 1–2 | 2–1 | 0–3 | 0–1 | 1–2 | 1–1 | 1–2 | 1–2 | 0–2 | 0–1 | 1–4 | 1–2 | 0–1 | 0–1 | 1–1 | 1–1 | — | 1–0 | 2–0 | 1–2 | 4–1 | 4–4 | 2–2 | 4–2 |
| Salford City | 0–0 | 1–1 | 0–1 | 1–4 | 0–1 | 2–2 | 3–0 | 3–1 | 0–1 | 1–1 | 1–1 | 2–0 | 0–2 | 2–0 | 3–1 | 2–1 | 2–1 | — | 1–0 | 0–2 | 2–0 | 1–2 | 0–1 | 1–0 |
| Stevenage | 2–1 | 5–0 | 2–3 | 2–1 | 1–1 | 3–1 | 1–0 | 1–0 | 1–0 | 2–0 | 1–0 | 1–0 | 3–0 | 0–0 | 1–0 | 2–3 | 1–0 | 1–3 | — | 2–1 | 3–0 | 2–0 | 0–1 | 3–1 |
| Stockport County | 1–0 | 2–3 | 0–0 | 2–0 | 1–0 | 2–1 | 2–0 | 0–0 | 0–0 | 1–3 | 0–0 | 1–1 | 1–2 | 1–1 | 4–0 | 2–0 | 1–0 | 1–1 | 2–0 | — | 3–0 | 1–1 | 3–2 | 1–1 |
| Sutton United | 2–1 | 1–0 | 0–2 | 1–1 | 1–0 | 3–0 | 1–1 | 2–0 | 2–1 | 0–1 | 2–1 | 2–0 | 0–2 | 2–1 | 1–1 | 1–2 | 1–0 | 1–2 | 0–0 | 0–1 | — | 2–1 | 0–2 | 1–1 |
| Swindon Town | 0–0 | 0–0 | 1–0 | 1–2 | 1–0 | 2–1 | 0–1 | 0–2 | 3–3 | 5–0 | 3–0 | 2–1 | 1–1 | 2–4 | 1–0 | 1–2 | 3–0 | 0–0 | 0–1 | 0–1 | 3–2 | — | 1–1 | 1–2 |
| Tranmere Rovers | 0–2 | 1–0 | 1–2 | 0–2 | 2–0 | 1–0 | 3–0 | 3–0 | 3–0 | 2–0 | 1–1 | 1–1 | 1–0 | 0–2 | 1–3 | 0–1 | 1–1 | 1–0 | 1–2 | 0–0 | 2–2 | 1–0 | — | 1–1 |
| Walsall | 3–1 | 0–1 | 0–0 | 0–0 | 1–1 | 2–1 | 0–0 | 2–1 | 2–0 | 1–2 | 3–1 | 4–0 | 1–1 | 2–1 | 1–1 | 1–0 | 1–0 | 2–3 | 1–1 | 0–2 | 1–1 | 0–0 | 0–1 | — |

Legend: Blue = home team win; Yellow = draw; Red = away team win.
For upcoming matches, an "a" indicates there is an article about the rivalry between the two participants.

== Season statistics ==
As of 3 May 2023

=== Top scorers ===
| Rank | Player | Club | Goals |
|---|---|---|---|
| 1 | (England) Andy Cook | Bradford City | 28 |
| 2 | (England) Sam Hoskins | Northampton Town | 21 |
| 3 | (England) Kristian Dennis | Carlisle United | 20 |
| 4 | (Ghana) Dan Agyei | Crewe Alexandra | 16 |
| 4 | (England) Luke Armstrong | Harrogate Town | 16 |
| 6 | (England) Omar Bogle | Newport County | 15 |
| 6 | (England) Josh Gordon | Barrow | 15 |
| 8 | (England) Kyle Wootton | Stockport County | 14 |
| 9 | (England) Danny Johnson | Walsall; Mansfield Town | 13 |

=== Hat-tricks ===
| Player | For | Against | Result | Date | Ref |
|---|---|---|---|---|---|
| (England) Danny Johnson | Walsall | Hartlepool United | 4–0 | 30 July 2022 | |
| (England) Billy Waters | Barrow | Colchester United | 3–1 | 1 November 2022 | |
| (England) Matt Smith | Salford City | Grimsby Town | 1–4 | 29 December 2022 | |
| (England) Charlie Austin | Swindon Town | Rochdale | 4–4 | 19 March 2023 | |
| (England) Dan Kemp | Hartlepool United | Grimsby Town | 1–4 | 7 April 2023 | |
| (England) Josh Gordon | Barrow | Crawley Town | 4–0 | 10 April 2023 | |

== Awards ==
=== Monthly ===
| Month | Manager of the Month | | Player of the Month | | Reference |
|---|---|---|---|---|---|
| August | (England) Richie Wellens | Leyton Orient | (England) Sam Hoskins | Northampton Town | |
| September | (England) Richie Wellens | Leyton Orient | (England) Andy Cook | Bradford City | |
| October | (Wales) Michael Flynn | Walsall | (Republic of Ireland) Paddy Madden | Stockport County | |
| November | (England) Johnnie Jackson | AFC Wimbledon | (England) Billy Waters | Barrow | |
| December | (England) Dave Challinor | Stockport County | (England) Kyle Wootton | Stockport County | |
| January | (England) Matt Bloomfield | Colchester United | (England) Conor McAleny | Salford City | |
| February | (England) Dave Challinor | Stockport County | (England) Dan Kemp | Hartlepool United | |
| March | (Australia) Jon Brady | Northampton Town | (England) Callum Hendry | Salford City | |

=== Annual ===
| Award | Winner | Club |
|---|---|---|
| Player of the Season | (England) Sam Hoskins | Northampton Town |
| Young Player of the Season | (Cameroon) Junior Tchamadeu | Colchester United |
| Manager of the Season | (England) Richie Wellens | Leyton Orient |
