= 2023–24 Stockport County F.C. season =

142nd season in existence of Stockport County FC

Stockport County
2023–24 season
- Owner: Mark Stott
- Chairman: Ken Knott
- Manager: Dave Challinor
- Stadium: Edgeley Park
- League Two: 1st
- FA Cup: Second round
- EFL Cup: First round
- EFL Trophy: Round of 32
- Top goalscorer: League: Isaac Olaofe (20); All: Paddy Madden (22)

The 2023–24 season is the 142nd season in the history of Stockport County and their second consecutive season in League Two. The club are participating in League Two, the FA Cup, the EFL Cup, and the 2023–24 EFL Trophy.

On 13 April 2024, Stockport secured promotion to League One, the third division of English football, for the first time in 14 years with a 2–0 win over Morecambe. The following day, defender Fraser Horsfall was named in the League Two Team of the Season at the annual EFL Awards.

== Current squad ==
As of 18 March 2024

No.	Name	Position	Nationality	Place of birth	Date of birth (age)	Previous club	Date signed	Fee	Contract end
Goalkeepers
1	Ben Hinchliffe	GK	(England)	Preston	10 September 1987 (age 39)	AFC Fylde	1 July 2016	Free	30 June 2024
12	Jordan Smith	GK	(England)	South Normanton	8 December 1994 (age 31)	Nottingham Forest	13 July 2023	Free	30 June 2024
13	Bobby Jones	GK	(Republic of Ireland)		20 November 2001 (age 24)	AFC Fylde	19 September 2022	Free	30 June 2024
Defenders
2	Kyle Knoyle	RB	(England)	Newham	24 September 1996 (age 30)	Doncaster Rovers	13 January 2023	Undisclosed	30 June 2025
3	Ibou Touray	LB	(The Gambia)	(England) Liverpool	24 December 1994 (age 31)	Salford City	1 July 2023	Free	30 June 2025
5	Neill Byrne	CB	(Republic of Ireland)	Portmarnock	2 February 1993 (age 33)	Tranmere Rovers	6 January 2023	Undisclosed	30 June 2024
6	Fraser Horsfall	CB	(England)	Huddersfield	12 November 1996 (age 29)	Northampton Town	1 July 2022	Free	30 June 2025
7	Macauley Southam-Hales	RB	(Wales)	Cardiff	2 February 1996 (age 30)	Fleetwood Town	2 September 2020	Free	30 June 2024
15	Ethan Pye	LB	(England)	Manchester	7 November 2002 (age 24)	Rochdale	1 July 2021	Undisclosed	30 June 2024
23	Ethan Bristow	LB	(Saint Kitts and Nevis)	(England) Maidenhead	27 November 2001 (age 24)	(United States) Minnesota United	1 January 2024	Loan	31 May 2024
26	Rhys Bennett	CB	(England)	Manchester	30 October 2003 (age 23)	Manchester United	19 January 2024	Loan	31 May 2024
29	Josh Popoola	CB	(England)		7 May 2004 (age 22)	Bournemouth	31 July 2023	Free	30 June 2024
32	Lewis Cass	CB	(England)	North Shields	27 February 2000 (age 26)	Port Vale	1 February 2024	Loan	31 May 2024
34	Todd Kane	RB	(England)	Huntingdon	17 September 1993 (age 33)	(Gibraltar) Manchester 62	12 March 2024	Free	30 June 2024
52	Joe Hillary	CB	(England)			Academy	28 December 2023	Trainee	30 June 2024
Midfielders
4	Akil Wright	CM	(England)	Derby	13 May 1996 (age 30)	York City	1 July 2022	Free	30 June 2024
8	Callum Camps	CM	(Northern Ireland)	(England) Stockport	30 November 1995 (age 30)	Fleetwood Town	4 July 2022	Free	30 June 2025
10	Antoni Sarcevic	CM	(England)	Manchester	13 March 1992 (age 34)	Bolton Wanderers	22 October 2021	Free	30 June 2024
11	Nick Powell	AM	(England)	Crewe	23 March 1994 (age 32)	Stoke City	7 July 2023	Free Transfer	30 June 2026
14	Will Collar	DM	(England)	Horsham	3 February 1997 (age 29)	(Scotland) Hamilton Academical	6 February 2021	Free	30 June 2025
17	Ryan Rydel	LM	(England)	Oldham	9 February 2001 (age 25)	Fleetwood Town	22 April 2021	Undisclosed	30 June 2024
18	Ryan Croasdale	CM	(England)	Lancaster	26 September 1994 (age 32)	AFC Fylde	29 September 2020	Free	30 June 2024
22	Rico Richards	AM	(England)	West Bromwich	27 September 2003 (age 23)	Aston Villa	18 January 2024	Loan	31 May 2024
24	Connor Lemonheigh-Evans	AM	(Wales)	Swansea	24 January 1997 (age 29)	Torquay United	1 July 2022	Free	30 June 2024
27	Odin Bailey	AM	(England)	Birmingham	8 December 1999 (age 26)	Salford City	9 January 2024	Undisclosed	30 June 2026
28	Ashton Mee	CM	(England)	Stockport		Academy	22 August 2023	Trainee	30 June 2024
30	Cody Johnson	CM	(England)	Oldham	3 October 2004 (age 22)	Academy	1 January 2023	Trainee	30 June 2024
Forwards
9	Paddy Madden	CF	(Republic of Ireland)	Dublin	4 March 1990 (age 36)	Fleetwood Town	15 March 2021	Undisclosed	30 June 2024
16	Jack Stretton	CF	(Scotland)	Newhall	6 September 2001 (age 25)	Derby County	7 January 2023	Undisclosed	30 June 2025
19	Kyle Wootton	CF	(England)	Kidderminster	11 October 1996 (age 30)	Notts County	1 July 2022	Free	30 June 2025
20	Louie Barry	LW	(England)	Sutton Coldfield	21 June 2003 (age 23)	Aston Villa	28 July 2023	Loan	31 May 2024
21	Myles Hippolyte	LW	(Grenada)	(England) London	9 November 1994 (age 32)	Scunthorpe United	31 January 2022	Free	30 June 2024
25	Isaac Olaofe	CF	(England)	Lewisham	21 November 1999 (age 26)	Millwall	1 January 2023	Undisclosed	30 June 2025
31	Ben Knight	RW	(England)	Cambridge	14 June 2002 (age 24)	Manchester City	12 March 2024	Loan	31 May 2024
Out on Loan
	Ethan Ross	GK	(England)	Enfield	6 March 1997 (age 29)	Lincoln City	8 July 2021	Free	30 June 2024

== Transfers ==
=== In ===
Date	Pos	Player	Transferred from	Fee	Ref
1 July 2023	CF	(England) Billy Chadwick	(England) Hull City	Free Transfer	
1 July 2023	LB	(The Gambia) Ibou Touray	(England) Salford City	Free Transfer	
7 July 2023	AM	(England) Nick Powell	(England) Stoke City	Free Transfer	
31 July 2023	RB	(England) Sam Bird †	(England) Fleetwood Town	Free Transfer	
31 July 2023	CM	(England) Ackeme Francis-Burrell †	(England) Wolverhampton Wanderers	Free Transfer	
31 July 2023	LB	(England) Taylor McMahon †	(England) Stoke City	Free Transfer	
31 July 2023	CB	(England) Josh Popoola †	(England) Bournemouth	Free Transfer	
9 January 2023	AM	(England) Odin Bailey	(England) Salford City	Undisclosed	
12 March 2024	RB	(England) Todd Kane	(Gibraltar) Manchester 62	Free Transfer	

† signed for Emerging Talent Group

=== Out ===
Date	Pos	Player	Transferred to	Fee	Ref
30 June 2023	CB	(England) Ben Barclay	(England) Carlisle United	Free Transfer	
30 June 2023	RB	(Scotland) Phil Bardsley	Free agent	Released	
30 June 2023	DM	(England) Jacob Davenport	(England) Morecambe	Released	
30 June 2023	RB	(England) Chris Hussey	(England) Walsall	Released	
30 June 2023	CB	(Northern Ireland) Ryan Johnson	(England) AFC Wimbledon	Released	
14 July 2023	CF	(Republic of Ireland) Daniel Okwute	(Republic of Ireland) Kerry	Free Transfer	
17 July 2023	CF	(England) Scott Quigley	(England) Eastleigh	Free Transfer	
30 August 2023	RW	(England) Ollie Crankshaw	(England) Altrincham	Undisclosed	
2 January 2024	CF	(England) Billy Chadwick	(England) York City	Free Transfer	
10 January 2024	CB	(Wales) Joe Lewis	(England) AFC Wimbledon	Undisclosed	
11 January 2024	RB	(England) Sam Bird	(Scotland) Stirling Albion	Free Transfer	

=== Loaned in ===
Date	Pos	Player	Loaned from	Until	Ref
26 July 2023	RB	(England) Jayden Richardson	(Scotland) Aberdeen	12 January 2024 (Note: On 12 January, Richardson was recalled to Aberdeen early.)	
28 July 2023	LW	(England) Louie Barry	(England) Aston Villa	End of Season	
28 August 2023	AM	(Wales) Joel Cotterill	(Wales) Swansea City	15 January 2024 (Note: On 15 January, Cotterill returned to Swansea early from his season-long loan.)	
31 August 2023	CB	(England) Alfie Pond	(England) Wolverhampton Wanderers	2 January 2024 (Note: On 2 January, Pond was mutually recalled to Wolves early from his season-long loan.)	
1 September 2023	AM	(England) Odin Bailey	(England) Salford City	1 January 2024	
1 January 2024	LB	(Saint Kitts and Nevis) Ethan Bristow	(United States) Minnesota United	End of Season	
18 January 2024	AM	(England) Rico Richards	(England) Aston Villa	End of Season	
19 January 2024	CB	(England) Rhys Bennett	(England) Manchester United	End of Season	
1 February 2024	CB	(England) Lewis Cass	(England) Port Vale	End of Season	
12 March 2024	RW	(England) Ben Knight	(England) Manchester City	End of Season	

=== Loaned out ===
Date	Pos	Player	Loaned to	Date until	Ref
1 July 2023	CB	(Wales) Joe Lewis	(England) AFC Wimbledon	10 January 2024 (Note: On 10 January, Lewis joined Wimbledon permanently.)	
25 July 2023	GK	(England) Ethan Ross	(England) Altrincham	End of Season	
1 August 2023	CF	(England) Billy Chadwick	(England) Gateshead	2 January 2024 (Note: On 2 January, Chadwick was recalled from his loan at Gateshead in order to sign for York.)	
1 September 2023	AM	(Wales) Connor Lemonheigh-Evans	(England) AFC Wimbledon	10 January 2024 (Note: On 10 January, Lemonheigh-Evans was recalled early from his loan at Wimbledon.)	
1 September 2023	CB	(England) Josh Popoola	(England) Spennymoor Town	29 September 2023	
25 February 2024	GK	(Republic of Ireland) Bobby Jones	(England) Marine	End of Season	
29 March 2024	CB	(England) Luke Partington	(England) Guiseley	End of Season	

== Pre-season and friendlies ==
On 30 May, Stockport announced their first pre-season friendly, against Preston North End to celebrate the club's 140th anniversary. Three days later, a further four matches were confirmed against Lincoln City, Altrincham, Chester and Huddersfield Town. On 6 June, the club announced their sixth and final pre-season opposition, against Blackburn Rovers.

Win Draw Loss Fixtures

7 July 2023 Friendly	Stockport County	1–1	Lincoln City	San Pedro del Pinatar, Spain
13:00 CEST; 12:00 BST	Sarcevic 14'		Smith 38'	Stadium: Pinatar Arena

15 July 2023 Friendly	Altrincham	2–4	Stockport County	Altrincham
15:00 BST	Linney 36'; Amaluzor 90'		Sarcevic 54'; Camps 58'; Powell 76'; Lemonheigh-Evans 80'	Stadium: Moss Lane

18 July 2023 Friendly	Chester	2–3	Stockport County	Chester
19:45 BST	Caton 8'; Weeks 70' (pen.)	Report	Lemonheigh-Evans 2'; Sarcevic 42'; Madden 65'	Stadium: Deva Stadium; Attendance: 957 (220 away)

22 July 2023 Friendly	Stockport County	0–4	Huddersfield Town	Stockport
15:00 BST			Ward 4'; Koroma 33'; Rudoni 62'; Hudlin 77'	Stadium: Edgeley Park; Attendance: 2,723

28 July 2023 Friendly	Stockport County	0–1	Blackburn Rovers	Stockport
19:30 BST		Report	Gilsenan 70' (pen.)	Stadium: Edgeley Park; Attendance: 2,416 (878 away)

29 July 2023 Friendly	Stockport County	2–0	Preston North End	Stockport
15:00 BST	Collar 17'; Rydel 74'	Report		Stadium: Edgeley Park; Attendance: 4,200 (685 away)

== Competitions ==
=== Overall record ===
Competition	First match	Last match	Starting round	Final position	Record							
Competition	First match	Last match	Starting round	Final position	Pld	W	D	L	GF	GA	GD	Win %
League Two	5 August	27 April	Matchday 1	Champions	45	27	11	7	96	48	+48	60.00
FA Cup	4 November	13 December	First round		3	1	1	1	7	4	+3	33.33
EFL Cup	8 August	8 August	First round	First round	1	0	1	0	1	1	+0	0.00
EFL Trophy	23 August	5 December	Group stage	Second round	4	1	1	2	4	6	−2	25.00
Total					53	29	14	10	108	59	+49	54.72

Last updated: 20 April 2024
Source: Soccerway

=== League Two ===
==== League table ====
Pos	Team	Pld	W	D	L	GF	GA	GD	Pts	Promotion, qualification or relegation
1	Stockport County (C, P)	46	27	11	8	96	48	+48	92	Promoted to EFL League One
2	Wrexham (P)	46	26	10	10	89	52	+37	88	Promoted to EFL League One
3	Mansfield Town (P)	46	24	14	8	90	47	+43	86	Promoted to EFL League One
4	Milton Keynes Dons	46	23	9	14	83	68	+15	78	Qualified for League Two play-offs
5	Doncaster Rovers	46	21	8	17	73	68	+5	71	Qualified for League Two play-offs
6	Crewe Alexandra	46	19	14	13	69	65	+4	71	Qualified for League Two play-offs

Source: EFL Official Website
Rules for classification: 1) Points; 2) Goal difference; 3) Number of goals scored; 4) Head-to-head results; 5) Wins; 6) Away goals; 7) Penalty points (sec 9.5); 8) 12-point sending off offences
(C) Champions; (P) Promoted

==== Results summary ====
Overall								Home						Away					
Pld	W	D	L	GF	GA	GD	Pts	W	D	L	GF	GA	GD	W	D	L	GF	GA	GD
46	27	11	8	95	46	+49	92	15	5	3	48	17	+31	12	6	5	47	29	+18

Last updated: 20 April 2024.
Source: Soccerway

==== Results by round ====
Round	1	2	3	4	5	6	7	8	9	10	11	12	13	14	15	16	17	18	19	20	21	22	23	24	25	26	28	30	31	32	33	34	27^{1}	35	37	38	39	40	41	42	43	36^{3}	44	29^{2}	45	46
Ground	H	A	H	H	A	H	A	A	H	A	H	H	A	H	A	H	A	H	A	H	A	H	H	A	A	H	H	A	H	A	H	A	A	H	H	A	A	H	A	H	A	A	H	A	H	A
Result	L	L	D	W	L	D	W	W	W	W	W	W	W	W	W	W	W	W	L	D	D	W	W	D	D	L	W	W	D	W	L	L	D	D	W	D	D	W	W	W	W	W	W	W	W	L
Position	20	22	22	16	19	20	17	13	9	8	4	2	1	1	1	1	1	1	1	1	1	1	1	1	1	1	1	1	1	1	1	1	1	2	2	2	2	2	1	1	1	1	1	1	1	1
Points	0	0	1	4	4	5	8	11	14	17	20	23	26	29	32	35	38	41	41	42	43	46	49	50	51	51	54	57	58	61	61	61	62	63	66	67	68	71	74	77	80	83	86	89	92	92

Updated to match(es) played on 20 April 2024. Source: Soccerway
A = Away; H = Home; W = Win; D = Draw; L = Loss; P = Postponed
Notes:
- ^{1} Matchday 27 (vs Gillingham) was postponed due Gillingham's FA Cup involvement.
- ^{2} Matchday 29 (vs Notts County) was postponed due to a frozen pitch.
- ^{3} Matchday 36 (vs Colchester United) was postponed due to a waterlogged pitch.

==== Matches ====
On 22 June, the EFL League Two fixtures were released.

Win Draw Loss Fixtures

5 August 2023 1	Stockport County	0–1	Gillingham	Stockport
15:00 BST		Report	Williams (yellow card) 3'; Coleman (yellow card) 45'; Ogie (yellow card) 58'; Nichols (yellow card) 76'; McKenzie 86'; Clarke (yellow card) 90+4'	Stadium: Edgeley Park; Attendance: 9,116; Referee: Mr Ben Speedie

12 August 2023 2	Walsall	2–1	Stockport County	Walsall
15:00 BST	Johnson 24'; Stirk (yellow card) 42'; Draper (yellow card) 49'; Hutchinson (yellow card) 63'; Oteh 79'	Report	Johnson (yellow card) 7'; Horsfall (yellow card) 67'; Barry (yellow card) 70'; Southam-Hales (yellow card) 75'; Olaofe (yellow card) 82'; Rydel 90+7'	Stadium: Bescot Stadium; Attendance: 6,008; Referee: Mr Jacob Miles

15 August 2023 3	Stockport County	1–1	Bradford City	Stockport
19:45 BST	Knoyle (yellow card) 20'; Olaofe 80'; Croasdale (yellow card) 87'	Report	Gilliead (yellow card) 20'; Pattison 47'; Oyegoke (yellow card) 52'; Platt (yellow card) 52'	Stadium: Edgeley Park; Attendance: 9,296; Referee: Mr Seb Stockbridge

19 August 2023 4	Stockport County	1–0	Barrow	Stockport
15:00 BST	Knoyle (yellow card) 21'; Collar (yellow card) 26'; Barry 66'	Report	Foley (yellow card) 30'	Stadium: Edgeley Park; Attendance: 8,364; Referee: Mr Peter Wright

26 August 2023 5	Mansfield Town	3–2	Stockport County	Mansfield
15:00 BST	Maris 14'; Reed (yellow card) 52'; Keillor-Dunn 69', 80'	Report	Barry 6'; Horsfall 25'	Stadium: Field Mill; Attendance: 7,492; Referee: Mr Ollie Yates

2 September 2023 6	Stockport County	3–3	Crawley Town	Stockport
15:00 BST	Barry 13'; Sarcevic 36'; Powell (yellow card) 56'; Olaofe 89'	Report	Gladwin (yellow card) 38'; Campbell 42'; Maguire 54'; Orsi (yellow card) 56', (goal) 66'; Lolos (yellow card) 71'; Henry (yellow card) 84'; Williams (yellow card) 90+1'	Stadium: Edgeley Park; Attendance: 7,986; Referee: Mr Marc Edwards

9 September 2023 7	AFC Wimbledon	1–2	Stockport County	Wimbledon
15:00 BST	Davison 32', (yellow card) 42'; Brown (yellow card) 45+3'	Report	Croasdale (yellow card) 45+2'; Barry 50'; Collar 62'; Olaofe (yellow card) 68'	Stadium: Plough Lane; Attendance: 7,607; Referee: Mr Alan Young

16 September 2023 8	Milton Keynes Dons	1–2	Stockport County	Milton Keynes
15:00 BST	Eisa 26'; Robson (yellow card) 58'; Smith (yellow card) 62'; Gilbey (yellow card) 72'; Harvie (yellow card) 83'	Report	Barry 17', (yellow card) 75'; Powell 45+2'; Pye (yellow card) 88'	Stadium: Stadium MK; Attendance: 7,085; Referee: Mr Edward Duckworth

23 September 2023 9	Stockport County	5–0	Wrexham	Stockport
15:00 BST	Olaofe 21', 30', 50', (yellow card) 22'; Barry 32'; Madden 90'	Report	Dalby (yellow card) 48'	Stadium: Edgeley Park; Attendance: 9,548; Referee: Mr Carl Brook

30 September 2023 10	Accrington Stanley	1–3	Stockport County	Accrington
15:00 BST	Pritchard (yellow card) 61'; Nolan 86'	Report	Olaofe 12'; Collar 16'; Bailey (yellow card) 43'; Barry 59' (pen.)	Stadium: Crown Ground; Attendance: 3,913; Referee: Mr Tom Reeves

3 October 2023 11	Stockport County	2–0	Forest Green Rovers	Stockport
19:45 BST	Olaofe 15'; Sarcevic 35'; Southam-Hales (yellow card) 47'	Report	Lavinier (yellow card) 39' (yellow-red card) 62'	Stadium: Edgeley Park; Attendance: 7,517; Referee: Mr Ross Joyce

7 October 2023 12	Stockport County	1–0	Doncaster Rovers	Stockport
15:00 BST	Croasdale (yellow card) 34'; Madden (yellow card) 74'; Olaofe 83'	Report	Molyneux (yellow card) 9'	Stadium: Edgeley Park; Attendance: 9,522; Referee: Mr Adam Herczeg

14 October 2023 13	Harrogate Town	1–3	Stockport County	Harrogate
15:00 BST	Thomson 73' (pen.)	Report	Sarcevic 14'; Croasdale (yellow card) 30'; Burrell 50' (o.g.); Collar 69'	Stadium: Wetherby Road; Attendance: 2,360; Referee: Mr Thomas Parsons

21 October 2023 14	Stockport County	3–2	Grimsby Town	Stockport
15:00 GMT	Barry 6' (pen.), 74'; Olaofe 8', (penalty missed) 39'; Hinchliffe (yellow card) 52'; Hippolyte (yellow card) 61'	Report	Clifton (yellow card) 12'; Eastwood (yellow card) 38'; Wilson 45+1'; Holohan 52' (pen.); Rodgers (yellow card) 72'	Stadium: Edgeley Park; Attendance: 9,498; Referee: Mr Scott Simpson

24 October 2023 15	Crewe Alexandra	0–2	Stockport County	Crewe
19:45 BST	Long (yellow card) 59'; Nevitt (yellow card) 90+8'	Report	Wootton 66', (yellow card) 90+3'; Olaofe 89'	Stadium: Gresty Road; Attendance: 6,634; Referee: Mr Martin Woods

28 October 2023 16	Stockport County	2–0	Tranmere Rovers	Stockport
15:00 GMT	Olaofe 5'; Sarcevic 54'	Report	Lewis (yellow card) 45'; Saunders (yellow card) 45+2' (yellow-red card) 48'	Stadium: Edgeley Park; Attendance: 9,735; Referee: Mr Christopher Pollard

11 November 2023 17	Swindon Town	2–4	Stockport County	Swindon
15:00 GMT	Kemp 31'; Mahoney (yellow card) 51'; Young 61'; Khan (yellow card) 68'	Report	Sarcevic (yellow card) 17'; Wootton (yellow card) 45+5' (goal) 69'; Collar 52' (pen.); Bailey 73'; Camps 89'	Stadium: The County Ground; Attendance: 8,475; Referee: Mr Sam Purkiss

18 November 2023 18	Stockport County	2–0	Colchester United	Stockport
15:00 GMT	Bailey (yellow card) 35'; Wootton 44'; Camps 46'; Pye (yellow card) 60'; Touray (yellow card) 85'	Report	Tovide (yellow card) 67'	Stadium: Edgeley Park; Attendance: 9,664; Referee: Mr Andy Davies

25 November 2023 19	Newport County	2–1	Stockport County	Newport
15:00 GMT	Morris 45+5'; McLoughlin 68'	Report	Touray (yellow card) 54'; Olaofe 90+6'	Stadium: Rodney Parade; Attendance: 4,053; Referee: Mr Darren Drysdale

28 November 2023 20	Stockport County	0–0	Salford City	Stockport
19:45 GMT	Croasdale (yellow card) 61'; Southam-Hales (yellow card) 76'	Report	Tilt (yellow card) 34'; N'Mai (yellow card) 58'	Stadium: Edgeley Park; Attendance: 8,790; Referee: Mr Ollie Yates

9 December 2023 21	Morecambe	1–1	Stockport County	Morecambe
15:00 GMT	Mellon 70'; Mayor (yellow card) 72'	Report	Wootton 87'	Stadium: Mazuma Stadium; Attendance: 4,505; Referee: Mr John Busby

16 December 2023 22	Stockport County	8–0	Sutton United	Stockport
15:00 GMT	Croasdale 6', 20'; Wootton 12'; Madden 23', 53', 90+3' (pen.); Cotterill 69'; Olaofe 86'	Report	Beautyman (yellow card) 15'	Stadium: Edgeley Park; Attendance: 8,703; Referee: Mr Adam Herczeg

22 December 2023 23	Stockport County	2–1	Notts County	Stockport
19:45 GMT	Wootton 7'; Croasdale (yellow card) 36'; Byrne (yellow card) 55'; Pye (yellow card) 56'; Richardson (yellow card) 84'; Madden 86' (pen.)	Report	Bostock (yellow card) 76'; Cameron (yellow card) 85'; McGoldrick 90+3'	Stadium: Edgeley Park; Attendance: 10,243; Referee: Mr Seb Stockbridge

26 December 2023 24	Barrow	2–2	Stockport County	Barrow-in-Furness
15:00 GMT	Whitfield 2'; Spence 24'; Ray (yellow card) 53'; Foley (yellow card) 62'	Report	Powell 45+2'; Madden (yellow card) 49'; Wright 54', (yellow card) 72'; Horsfall (yellow card) 69'; Wootton (yellow card) 90+4'	Stadium: Holker Street; Attendance: 5,866; Referee: Mr Martin Coy

29 December 2023 25	Bradford City	0–0	Stockport County	Bradford
19:45 GMT	Gilliead (yellow card) 50'; Oduor (yellow card) 70'	Report	Touray (yellow card) 45+1'; Wright (yellow card) 76'	Stadium: Valley Parade; Attendance: 9,657; Referee: Mr Lewis Smith

1 January 2024 26	Stockport County	0–2	Mansfield Town	Stockport
15:00 GMT	Bailey (yellow card) 42'	Report	Clarke (yellow card) 5'; Maris 49'; McLaughlin (yellow card) 68'; Reed (yellow card) 77'; Keillor-Dunn 90+12'	Stadium: Edgeley Park; Attendance: 10,334; Referee: Mr Daniel Middleton

13 January 2024 28	Stockport County	3–1	Walsall	Stockport
15:00 GMT	Wright 45+2'; Olaofe 55'; Madden 76' (pen.)	Report	James-Taylor 45+4'	Stadium: Edgeley Park; Attendance: 9,742; Referee: Mr Ben Atkinson

27 January 2024 30	Doncaster Rovers	1–5	Stockport County	Doncaster
15:00 GMT	McGrath (yellow card) 38'; Biggins 65'; Close (yellow card) 88'	Report	Madden 5', 46', (yellow card) 57'; Owen Bailey 10' (o.g.); Lemonheigh-Evans 33'; Olaofe 55'	Stadium: The Eco-Power Stadium; Attendance: 7,469; Referee: Mr David Rock

3 February 2024 31	Stockport County	1–1	Harrogate Town	Stockport
15:00 GMT	Lemonheigh-Evans 30'; Wright (yellow card) 63'; Sarcevic (yellow card) 85'; Horsfall (yellow card) 90+4'	Report	Cornelius 16'; Belshaw (yellow card) 51'	Stadium: Edgeley Park; Attendance: 9,325; Referee: Mr Ben Toner

10 February 2024 32	Grimsby Town	1–3	Stockport County	Cleethorpes
15:00 GMT	Thompson (yellow card) 31'; Smith (yellow card) 34'; Eisa 52'; Green (yellow card) 67'; Maher (yellow card) 77'	Report	Sarcevic 9' (yellow card) 48'; Olaofe 14'; Cass 28' (yellow card) 65'; Camps (yellow card) 42'	Stadium: Blundell Park; Attendance: 6,732; Referee: Mr Thomas Parsons

13 February 2024 33	Stockport County	1–3	Crewe Alexandra	Stockport
19:45 GMT	Olaofe 35'	Report	Demetriou 8'; Turns 43'; Austerfield 51'; Baker-Richardson (yellow card) 90+2'	Stadium: Edgeley Park; Attendance: 9,363; Referee: Mr Neil Hair

17 February 2024 34	Tranmere Rovers	4–0	Stockport County	Birkenhead
15:00 GMT	Davies 30'; Turnbull 55', 63', (yellow card) 84'; Jennings 85'	Report	Wootton (yellow card) 84'; Madden (yellow card) 84'	Stadium: Prenton Park; Attendance: 7,882; Referee: Mr Alex Chilowicz

20 February 2024 27	Gillingham	0–0	Stockport County	Gillingham
19:45 GMT	Ehmer (yellow card) 21'	Report	Collar (yellow card) 27'; Croasdale (yellow card) 40'	Stadium: Priestfield Stadium; Attendance: 5,321; Referee: Mr Lee Swabey
Note: Fixture was originally due to take place on 6 January, but was postponed due to Gillingham's FA Cup involvement.

24 February 2024 35	Stockport County	0–0	Swindon Town	Stockport
15:00 GMT		Report	Kokolo (yellow card) 90+5'; McKirdy (yellow card) 90+7'	Stadium: Edgeley Park; Attendance: 9,389; Referee: Mr Carl Brook

9 March 2024 37	Stockport County	1–0	Newport County	Stockport
15:00 GMT	Wootton (yellow card) 17'; Madden (penalty missed) 73' 90+3'	Report	Zanzala (yellow card) 21'; Payne (yellow card) 23'; Charsley (yellow card) 66'; Wildig (yellow card) 90+6'	Stadium: Edgeley Park; Attendance: 8,865; Referee: Mr Tom Reeves

14 March 2024 38	Salford City	2–2	Stockport County	Salford
20:00 GMT	Garbutt 8' (yellow card) 25'; Tilt 39'; Luamba (yellow card) 45+5'; Watson (yellow card) 66'; John (yellow card) 71'	Report	Horsfall (yellow card) 49'; Touray 51' (yellow card) 77'; Olaofe 64'	Stadium: Moor Lane; Attendance: 3,827; Referee: Mr Ollie Yates
Note: Fixture was initially scheduled for 12 March, but was moved back for live Sky Sports coverage.

18 March 2024 39	Crawley Town	1–1	Stockport County	Crawley
19:45 GMT	Orsi (yellow card) 54'; Lolos 83'	Report	Pye (yellow card) 20'; Sarcevic 61'	Stadium: Broadfield Stadium; Attendance: 3,339; Referee: Mr Matthew Russell
Note: Fixture was initially scheduled for 16 March, but was moved back due to the Salford away game be rescheduled.

23 March 2024 40	Stockport County	5–0	Milton Keynes Dons	Stockport
17:15 GMT	Camps 31'; Madden 36'; Olaofe 45+1'; Lemonheigh-Evans 51'; Byrne 90+5'			Stadium: Edgeley Park; Attendance: 9,727; Referee: Mr Marc Edwards
Note: Tea-time kick-off due to live coverage on Sky Sports.

29 March 2024 41	Forest Green Rovers	0–3	Stockport County	Nailsworth
15:00 GMT			Camps 19'; Ricards 28'; Lemonheigh-Evans 51'	Stadium: The New Lawn; Attendance: 3,145; Referee: Mr Charles Breakspear

1 April 2024 42	Stockport County	1–0	AFC Wimbledon	Stockport
15:00 BST	Bailey 85'			Stadium: Edgeley Park; Attendance: 9,550; Referee: Mr Lewis Smith

6 April 2024 43	Sutton United	1–3	Stockport County	Sutton
15:00 BST	Lakin 34' (pen.); Sowunmi (yellow card) 44'; Kizzi (yellow card) 45+5'; Hart (yellow card) 66'	Report	Madden 3', 30', 45+1'; Olaofe (yellow card) 25'; Touray (yellow card) 33'	Stadium: Gander Green Lane; Attendance: Sunny Singh Gill; Referee: 3,852

9 April 2024 36	Colchester United	1–2	Stockport County	Colchester
19:45 BST	McGeehan 44'		Powell 31'; Madden 61'	Stadium: Colchester Community Stadium; Attendance: 4,118; Referee: Mr Ben Atkinson
Note: Fixture was originally scheduled for 2 March, but was postponed due to a waterlogged pitch.

13 April 2024 44	Stockport County	2–0	Morecambe	Stockport
15:00 BST	Olaofe 8' (Wootton); Camps (yellow card) 40'; Horsfall 45+4' (Sarcevic)		Edwards (yellow card) 31'; Bedeau (yellow card) 45+6'; Brown (yellow card) 69'	Stadium: Edgeley Park; Attendance: 10,148; Referee: Lee Swabey

16 April 2024 29	Notts County	2–5	Stockport County	Nottingham
19:45 BST	Langstaff 61'; Crowley 63'		Madden 26', 33' (pen.), 40'; Sarcevic 50'; Pye 84'	Stadium: Meadow Lane; Attendance: 11,656; Referee: Mr Alex Chilowicz
Note: Fixture was originally scheduled for 20 January, but was postponed due to a frozen pitch.

20 April 2024 45	Stockport County	4–2	Accrington Stanley	Stockport
15:00 BST	Wootton 9', 62'; Lemonheigh-Evans 44'; Sarcevic 79'		Whalley 17'; Nolan 77'	Stadium: Edgeley Park; Attendance: 10,180; Referee: Mr Simon Mather

27 April 2024 46	Wrexham	2–1	Stockport County	Wrexham
15:00 BST	Palmer 47'; Cannon 88'		Lemonheigh-Evans 29'	Stadium: Racecourse Ground; Attendance: 12,562; Referee: Mr Steve Martin

=== FA Cup ===
County were drawn at home to Worksop Town in the first round.

Win Draw Loss Fixtures

4 November 2023 First round	Stockport County	5–1	Worksop Town	Stockport
15:00 GMT	Wootton 14', 38', 67', 71'; Bailey 83'	Report	Rollins 22'	Stadium: Edgeley Park; Attendance: 6,443; Referee: Aaron Jackson

3 December 2023 Second round	Aldershot Town	2–2	Stockport County	Aldershot
14:00 GMT	Stokes 10', 67' (yellow card) 79'; Willard (yellow card) 40'; Harries (yellow card) 90'	Report	Byrne 13'; Wright (yellow card) 27'; Madden 46'; Pye (yellow card) 49'; Southam-Hales (yellow card) 90+7'	Stadium: Recreation Ground; Attendance: 4,756; Referee: Paul Howard

13 December 2023 Second round	Stockport County	0–1	Aldershot Town	Edgeley
19:45 GMT	Camps (yellow card) 51'; Knoyle (yellow card) 90+1'	Report	Scott 88'	Stadium: Edgeley Park; Attendance: 2,855; Referee: Ben Speedie

=== EFL Cup ===
Stockport were drawn away to Sheffield Wednesday in the first round.

Win Draw Loss Fixtures

8 August 2023 First round	Sheffield Wednesday	1–1 (4–1 p)	Stockport County	Sheffield
19:45 BST	Valentín (yellow card) 8'; Vaulks (yellow card) 45'; Paterson (yellow card) 90+5'; Bakinson 90+7'	Report	Lemonheigh-Evans (yellow card) 4'; Olaofe (yellow card) 10'; Madden 16'; Rydel (yellow card) 84'	Stadium: Hillsborough Stadium; Attendance: 10,886; Referee: Lewis Smith
	Penalties
	Windass (penalty scored); Paterson (penalty scored); Bannan (penalty scored); Gregory (penalty scored)		(penalty missed) Madden; (penalty scored) Rydel; (penalty missed) Barry

=== EFL Trophy ===
The Group stage draw was finalised on 22 June 2023. After coming second in the group stages, Stockport were drawn away to Wigan Athletic.

==== Group stage ====
Pos	Div	Team	Pld	W	PW	PL	L	GF	GA	GD	Pts	Qualification
1	L1	Bolton Wanderers	3	3	0	0	0	13	1	+12	9	Advance to Round 2
2	L2	Stockport County	3	1	0	1	1	4	4	0	4	Advance to Round 2
3	L2	Salford City	3	1	0	0	2	5	9	−4	3	
4	ACA	Manchester United U21	3	0	1	0	2	5	13	−8	2	

Updated to match(es) played on 14 November 2023. Source: EFL.com

Win Draw Loss Fixtures

23 August 2023 Group stage	Stockport County	1–1 (3–5 p)	Manchester United U21	Stockport
19:30 BST	Croasdale (yellow card) 45+3' (yellow-red card) 76'; Johnson (yellow card) 51'; Wright (yellow card) 63'; Rydel (yellow card) 69'; Mee (yellow card) 83'; Byrne (yellow card) 89'; Olaofe 90+13' (pen.)	Report	Ogunneye (yellow card) 55'; Hugill (penalty missed) 64', 64'	Stadium: Edgeley Park; Attendance: 5,000; Referee: Matthew Corlett
	Penalties
	Lemonheigh-Evans (penalty scored); Barry (penalty scored); Rydel (penalty missed); Olaofe (penalty scored)		(penalty scored) McNeill; (penalty scored) Shoretire; (penalty scored) Nolan; (penalty scored) Williams; (penalty scored) Wheatley

10 October 2023 Group stage	Salford City	1–3	Stockport County	Salford
19:30 BST	Dackers 3'; Mallan (yellow card) 16'; Pedro (yellow card) 29'	Report	Madden 20' (pen.), 52', 67'; Pond (yellow card) 72'	Stadium: Moor Lane; Attendance: 1,355; Referee: David Bourne

14 November 2023 Group stage	Stockport County	0–2	Bolton Wanderers	Stockport
19:30 GMT	Pond (yellow card) 45+2'	Report	Böðvarsson 37', 45+1'; Thomason (yellow card) 88'	Stadium: Edgeley Park; Attendance: 3,427; Referee: Scott Oldham

5 December 2023 Second round	Wigan Athletic	2–0	Stockport County	Wigan
19:00 GMT	J. Smith 17'; Morrison 23'; S. Smith (yellow card) 63'	Report	Knoyle (yellow card) 38'; Powell (yellow card) 54'; Sarcevic (yellow card) 77'; Olaofe (yellow card) 85'	Stadium: DW Stadium; Attendance: 3,051; Referee: Sunny Gill

== Goalscorers ==
=== League goalscorers ===
There were 95 goals scored in 45 matches, for an average of 2.11 goals per match.

20 goals

- (England) Tanto Olaofe

17 goals

- (Republic of Ireland) Paddy Madden

9 goals

- (England) Louie Barry

8 goals

- (England) Antoni Sarcevic
- (England) Kyle Wootton

5 goals

- (Wales) Connor Lemonheigh-Evans

4 goals

- (Northern Ireland) Callum Camps
- (England) Will Collar
- (England) Nick Powell

2 goals

- (England) Odin Bailey
- (England) Ryan Croasdale
- (England) Fraser Horsfall
- (England) Akil Wright

1 goal

- (Republic of Ireland) Neill Byrne
- (England) Lewis Cass
- (Wales) Joel Cotterill
- (England) Ethan Pye
- (England) Rico Richards
- (England) Ryan Rydel
- (The Gambia) Ibou Touray

=== Cup goalscorers ===
Goals scored in the FA Cup, Carabao Cup and EFL Trophy. There were 12 goals scored in 8 matches, for an average of 1.5 goals per match.

5 goals

- (Republic of Ireland) Paddy Madden

4 goals

- (England) Kyle Wootton

1 goal

- (England) Odin Bailey
- (Republic of Ireland) Neill Byrne
- (England) Tanto Olaofe
