= 2022–23 Stockport County F.C. season =

Stockport County F.C.
2022–23 season
- Chairman: Mark Stott
- Manager: Dave Challinor
- Stadium: Edgeley Park
- League Two: 4th (qualified for play-offs)
- FA Cup: Third round
- EFL Cup: Second round
- EFL Trophy: Group stage
- Top goalscorer: League: Paddy Madden (9); All: Paddy Madden (10)
Home colours	Away colours	Third colours

The 2022–23 season is the 141st season in the existence of Stockport County Football Club and the club's first season back in League Two. In addition to the league, they will also compete in the 2022–23 FA Cup, the 2022–23 EFL Cup and the 2022–23 EFL Trophy.

== Transfers ==
=== In ===
Date	Pos	Player	Transferred from	Fee	Ref
17 June 2022	CB	(Wales) Joe Lewis	(England) Torquay United	Undisclosed	
1 July 2022 (Note: The transfer was announced on 27 June, and would become official on July 1, once his Northampton Town contract expired)	CB	(England) Fraser Horsfall	(England) Northampton Town	Free Transfer	
1 July 2022 (Note: The transfer was announced on 14 June, and would become official on July 1, once his Torquay United contract expired)	AM	(Wales) Connor Lemonheigh-Evans	(England) Torquay United	Free Transfer	
1 July 2022 (Note: The transfer was announced on 17 June, and would become official on July 1, once his York City contract expired)	CM	(England) Akil Wright	(England) York City	Free Transfer	
1 July 2022 (Note: The transfer was announced on 9 June, and would become official on July 1, once his Notts County contract expired)	CF	(England) Kyle Wootton	(England) Notts County	Free Transfer	
4 July 2022	CM	(Northern Ireland) Callum Camps	(England) Fleetwood Town	Free Transfer	
2 September 2022	LB	(England) Chris Hussey	(England) Port Vale	Free Transfer	
2 September 2022	CF	(Republic of Ireland) Daniel Okwute	(Republic of Ireland) Kerry	Undisclosed	
8 October 2022	LB	(Scotland) Calum Macdonald	(England) Tranmere Rovers	Free Transfer	
13 December 2022	RB	(Scotland) Phil Bardsley	(England) Burnley	Free Transfer	
1 January 2023 (Note: The transfer was announced on 30 December, and would become official on January 1, once the transfer window re-opens.)	CF	(England) Isaac Olaofe	(England) Millwall	Undisclosed	
6 January 2023	CB	(Republic of Ireland) Neill Byrne	(England) Tranmere Rovers	Undisclosed	
7 January 2023	CF	(Scotland) Jack Stretton	(England) Derby County	Undisclosed	
13 January 2023	RB	(England) Kyle Knoyle	(England) Doncaster Rovers	Undisclosed	
20 February 2023	DM	(England) Jacob Davenport	(England) Lincoln City	Free Transfer	

=== Out ===
Date	Pos	Player	Transferred to	Fee	Ref
10 June 2022 (Note: The transfer was announced on 19 May, and would become official on June 10 once the transfer window opened)	DF	(England) Scott Holding	(England) Watford	Undisclosed	
30 June 2022	LW	(Republic of Ireland) Millenic Alli	(England) FC Halifax Town	Released	
30 June 2022	CB	(England) Liam Hogan	(England) Oldham Athletic	Released	
30 June 2022	DM	(Saint Kitts and Nevis) Lois Maynard	(England) Oldham Athletic	Released	
30 June 2022	GK	(England) Joshua Schofield	Unattached	Released	
30 June 2022	CB	(England) Jamie Stott	(England) FC Halifax Town	Released	
30 June 2022	LM	(England) Tom Walker	(England) AFC Fylde	Released	
12 July 2022	CB	(England) Jordan Keane	(England) FC Halifax Town	Free Transfer	
21 July 2022	LM	(England) Ben Whitfield	(England) Barrow	Free Transfer	
28 July 2022	RB	(England) Sam Minihan	(England) FC Halifax Town	Free Transfer	
20 October 2022	LB	(England) Mark Kitching	(England) Oldham Athletic	Mutual Consent	
22 November 2022	CF	(England) Alex Reid	(England) Oldham Athletic	Undisclosed	
1 January 2023	RM	(England) Elliot Newby	(England) Barrow	Undisclosed	
31 January 2023	CF	(England) Connor Jennings	(England) Hartlepool United	Free Transfer	
31 January 2023	LB	(Scotland) Calum Macdonald	(England) Bristol Rovers	Free Transfer	

=== Loans in ===
Date	Pos	Player	Loaned from	On loan until	Ref
4 July 2022	GK	(Czech Republic) Vítězslav Jaroš	(England) Liverpool	End of Season	
29 July 2022	RB	(Republic of Ireland) James Brown	(England) Blackburn Rovers	9 January 2023 (Note: On 9 January, Brown was recalled back to Blackburn)	
31 January 2023	RB	(England) Aaron Rowe	(England) Huddersfield Town	End of Season	
1 February 2023	CB	(England) Joe Grayson	(England) Barrow	End of Season	

=== Loans out ===
Date	Pos	Player	Loaned to	On loan until	Ref
1 July 2022	CF	(England) Alex Reid	(England) Solihull Moors	22 November 2022 (Note: On 22 November, Alex Reid joined Oldham Athletic on a permanent basis.)	
1 July 2022	GK	(England) Ethan Ross	(England) York City	End of Season	
4 July 2022	CB	(England) Ben Barclay	(England) Carlisle United	End of Season	
23 July 2022	CB	(England) Ethan Pye	(England) Gateshead	End of Season	
1 September 2022	CF	(England) Scott Quigley	(England) Rochdale	End of Season	
3 November 2022	RM	(England) Elliot Newby	(England) Altrincham	1 January 2023	
7 November 2022	CF	(England) Connor Jennings	(England) Altrincham	7 December 2022	
12 January 2023	RW	(England) Ollie Crankshaw	(Scotland) Motherwell	End of Season	
27 January 2023	FW	(England) Keane Barugh	(England) Banbury United	1 March 2023	
27 January 2023	MF	(England) Cody Johnson	(England) Banbury United	1 March 2023	
10 February 2023	CB	(England) Ellis Farrar	(Republic of Ireland) Finn Harps	30 November 2023	
10 February 2023	CF	(Republic of Ireland) Daniel Okwute	(Republic of Ireland) Finn Harps	30 November 2023	
23 February 2023	AM	(Wales) Connor Lemonheigh-Evans	(England) Notts County	24 March 2023	

== Pre-season and friendlies ==
On May 23, County announced their first three pre-season friendlies, against Nuneaton Borough, Chorley and Curzon Ashton. A week later a fourth fixture, against Altrincham was confirmed. Also included was a behind-closed-doors friendly against Bolton Wanderers.

Win Draw Loss Fixtures

2 July 2022 Friendly	Nuneaton Borough	0–4	Stockport County	Nuneaton
15:00 BST		Report	Kitching 23'; Jennings 28'; Collar 33'; Pye 41'	Stadium: Liberty Way

5 July 2022 Friendly	Stockport County	2–2	Bolton Wanderers	Carrington
13:00	Collar 62'; Hippolyte 76'	Report	Kachunga 63'; Bradley 65'; Afolayan (yellow card) 84'	Stadium: Carrington Training Centre; Attendance: 0 (Behind closed doors)

9 July 2022 Friendly	Huddersfield Town XI	2–3	Stockport County	Huddersfield
12:00 BST	Jones 23', 27'	Report	Collar 11'; Madden 53'; Rydel 73'	Stadium: Canalside Sports Complex; Attendance: 0 (Behind closed doors)

15 July 2022 Friendly	Chorley	0–5	Stockport County	Chorley
19:30 BST		Report	Whitfield 32'; Quigley 47'; Crankshaw 53'; Rydel 60'; Johnson 85'	Stadium: Victory Park; Attendance: 1,028

16 July 2022 Friendly	Curzon Ashton	Cancelled	Stockport County	Ashton-under-Lyne
15:00 BST				Stadium: Tameside Stadium
Note: Fixture was cancelled due to concerns over the pitch at Tameside Stadium.

16 July 2022 Friendly	Manchester City U21s	0–2	Stockport County	Bradford-with-Beswick
15:00 BST		Report	Sarcevic 6'; Horsfall 85'	Stadium: Etihad Campus; Attendance: 0 (behind-closed-doors)

23 July 2022 Friendly	Altrincham	0–2	Stockport County	Altrincham
15:00 BST		Report	Madden 11' (pen.); Horsfall 21'	Stadium: Moss Lane; Attendance: 2,119

== Competitions ==
=== Overall record ===
Competition	First match	Last match	Starting round	Final position	Record							
Competition	First match	Last match	Starting round	Final position	Pld	W	D	L	GF	GA	GD	Win %
League Two	30 July 2022	May 2023	Matchday 1		49	23	14	12	68	39	+29	46.94
FA Cup	5 November 2022	8 January 2023	First round	Third round	4	2	1	1	10	5	+5	50.00
EFL Cup	9 August 2022	23 August 2022	First round	Second round	2	1	1	0	1	0	+1	50.00
EFL Trophy	30 August 2022	18 October 2022	Group stage	Group stage	3	1	0	2	2	3	−1	33.33
Total					58	27	16	15	81	47	+34	46.55

Last updated: 21 February 2023
Source: [ Soccerway]

=== League Two ===
==== League table ====
Pos	Team	Pld	W	D	L	GF	GA	GD	Pts	Promotion, qualification or relegation
1	Leyton Orient (C, P)	46	26	13	7	61	34	+27	91	Promotion to EFL League One
2	Stevenage (P)	46	24	13	9	61	39	+22	85	Promotion to EFL League One
3	Northampton Town (P)	46	23	14	9	62	42	+20	83	Promotion to EFL League One
4	Stockport County	46	22	13	11	65	37	+28	79	Qualification for League Two play-offs
5	Carlisle United (O, P)	46	20	16	10	66	43	+23	76	Qualification for League Two play-offs
6	Bradford City	46	20	16	10	61	43	+18	76	Qualification for League Two play-offs
7	Salford City	46	22	9	15	72	54	+18	75	Qualification for League Two play-offs

Source: EFL Official Website
Rules for classification: 1) Points; 2) Goal difference; 3) Number of goals scored; 4) Head-to-head results; 5) Wins; 6) Away goals; 7) Penalty points (sec 9.5); 8) 12-point sending off offences
(C) Champions; (O) Play-off winners; (P) Promoted

==== Results summary ====
Overall								Home						Away					
Pld	W	D	L	GF	GA	GD	Pts	W	D	L	GF	GA	GD	W	D	L	GF	GA	GD
45	22	12	11	64	36	+28	78	11	8	3	30	16	+14	11	4	8	34	20	+14

Last updated: 29 April 2023.
Source: [ Soccerway]

==== Results by round ====
Round	1	2	3	4	5	6	7	8	9	10	11	12	13	14	15	16	17	18	19	20	21	22	23	24	25	26	27	28	29	30	31	32	33	34	35	36	37	38	39	40	41	42	43	44	45
Ground	H	A	H	A	A	H	H	A	H	A	H	A	H	A	H	H	A	A	H	A	H	A	A	H	H	A	A	H	A	H	H	A	A	H	H	A	H	A	H	A	H	A	A	H	A
Result	L	L	W	L	L	D	W	L	D	L	D	W	L	W	W	W	D	W	L	W	W	W	L	W	D	L	D	W	W	W	W	W	L	D	D	W	D	W	D	W	W	D	D	W	W
Position	16	21	16	18	21	19	18	18	16	17	19	16	16	16	16	14	14	12	14	12	11	10	13	10	10	12	10	7	7	7	6	4	5	7	6	5	5	5	5	5	3	4	4	4	4

Updated to match(es) played on 29 April 2023. Source: [ Soccerway]
A = Away; H = Home; W = Win; D = Draw; L = Loss; P = Postponed

==== Matches ====
Win Draw Loss Fixtures

On 23 June, the league fixtures were announced.

30 July 2022 1	Stockport County	2–3	Barrow	Edgeley
15:00 BST	Sarcevic 49'; Hippolyte (yellow card) 51'; Madden 70', (yellow card) 89'	Report	Gordon 6'; Neal (yellow card) 15'; Whitfield 20'; Waters 33'; Foley (yellow card) 45+3'; Warren (yellow card) 90+2'; Rooney (yellow card) 90+2'	Stadium: Edgeley Park; Attendance: 10,011; Referee: Ollie Yates

6 August 2022 2	Stevenage	2–1	Stockport County	Stevenage
15:00 BST	Rose (yellow card) 85'; Norris 88' (pen.); Reid 90+5'	Report	Palmer (yellow card) 10' (yellow-red card) 87'; Camps 58'; Horsfall (yellow card) 66'; Sarcevic (yellow card) 75'	Stadium: Lamex Stadium; Attendance: 2,973; Referee: Adam Herczeg

13 August 2022 3	Stockport County	1–0	Colchester United	Edgeley
15:00 BST	Wootton 67'	Report	Chilvers (yellow card) 21'; Marshall (yellow card) 65'	Stadium: Edgeley Park; Attendance: 7,826; Referee: David Rock

16 August 2022 4	Doncaster Rovers	2–1	Stockport County	Doncaster
19:45 BST	Miller 35'; Agard 90+1'; Knoyle (yellow card) 90+5'	Report	Southam-Hales (red card) 21'; Rydel 46'; Crankshaw (yellow card) 86'; Jaroš (yellow card) 90'	Stadium: Eco-Power Stadium; Attendance: 6,309; Referee: Declan Bourne

20 August 2022 5	Mansfield Town	2–1	Stockport County	Mansfield
15:00 BST	Clarke (yellow card) 5', (goal) 56'; Swan 55'	Report	Sarcevic 53'; Camps (yellow card) 70'	Stadium: One Call Stadium; Attendance: 6,924; Referee: Anthony Backhouse

27 August 2022 6	Stockport County	1–1	Swindon Town	Edgeley
15:00 BST	Brown (yellow card) 52'; Jennings (yellow card) 66'; Madden (red card) 80'; Sarcevic 84'	Report	Blake-Tracy 49', (yellow card) 50'; Reed (yellow card) 70'	Stadium: Edgeley Park; Attendance: 8,233; Referee: Sam Allison

3 September 2022 7	Stockport County	1–0	AFC Wimbledon	Edgeley
15:00 BST	Horsfall 11', (yellow card) 53'	Report	Pell (yellow card) 4'	Stadium: Edgeley Park; Attendance: 8,073; Referee: Sunny Gill

9 September 2022	Tranmere Rovers	Postponed	Stockport County	Birkenhead
19:45 BST				Stadium: Prenton Park
Note: Fixture was postponed as a mark of respect, for the passing of Elizabeth II.

13 September 2022 8	Crawley Town	3–2	Stockport County	Crawley
19:45 BST	Tilley 5', (yellow card) 53'; Telford 35'; Tsaroulla 56'; Addai (yellow card) 90+7'	Report	Crankshaw 17'; Hussey 52'	Stadium: Broadfield Stadium; Attendance: 2,187; Referee: Neil Hair

17 September 2022 9	Stockport County	0–0	Harrogate Town	Edgeley
15:00 BST	Croasdale (yellow card) 32'	Report	Folarin (yellow card) 49'; McArdle (yellow card) 66'; Austerfield (yellow card) 90+3'	Stadium: Edgeley Park; Attendance: 7,863; Referee: Ross Joyce

24 September 2022 10	Northampton Town	2–1	Stockport County	Sixfields
14:00 BST	Guthrie (yellow card) 39'; Hoskins 48'; Lintott 63'; Hylton (yellow card) 65'	Report	Horsfall 12'; Wright (yellow card) 37' (yellow-red card) 90+4'; Sarcevic (yellow card) 40'; Wootton (yellow card) 80'	Stadium: PTS Academy Stadium; Attendance: 5,632; Referee: Darren Handley

1 October 2022 11	Stockport County	1–1	Walsall	Edgeley
15:00 BST	Madden 27'	Report	Kinsella (yellow card) 30'; Comley (yellow card) 37'; Cashman (yellow card) 87'; Williams 88'	Stadium: Edgeley Park; Attendance: 8,805; Referee: Andrew Kitchen

8 October 2022 12	Bradford City	0–1	Stockport County	Bradford
15:00 BST	Smallwood (yellow card) 38'; Angol (yellow card) 61'	Report	Madden 26' (pen.); Horsfall (yellow card) 61'; Hippolyte (yellow card) 74'	Stadium: University of Bradford Stadium; Attendance: 18,615; Referee: Leigh Doughty

15 October 2022 13	Stockport County	1–3	Grimsby Town	Edgeley
15:00 BST	Madden 41' (yellow card) 57'; Camps (red card) 72'	Report	Clifton 24'; Holohan 30'; Green (yellow card) 40'; Glennon (yellow card) 55'; Efete (yellow card) 67'; Taylor (yellow card) 90+3'; Hunt 90+5'; Crocombe (yellow card) 90+5'	Stadium: Edgeley Park; Attendance: 9,464; Referee: Alan Young

22 October 2022 14	Salford City	0–2	Stockport County	Salford
15:00 BST	Eastham (yellow card) 40'; Galbraith (yellow card) 53'	Report	Collar 45+2'; Madden 78'	Stadium: Moor Lane; Attendance: 3,633; Referee: Scott Oldham

25 October 2022 15	Stockport County	2–0	Carlisle United	Edgeley
19:45 BST	Hippolyte 20'; Wootton 57'	Report	Back (yellow card) 73'; Gibson (yellow card) 85'	Stadium: Edgeley Park; Attendance: 8,418; Referee: Ben Speedie

29 October 2022 16	Stockport County	3–0	Sutton United	Edgeley
15:00 BST	Brown (yellow card) 1'; Wootton 19'; Madden 57'; Collar 72'	Report	Bugiel (red card) 3'; John (yellow card) 38'; Hart (yellow card) 90+2'	Stadium: Edgeley Park; Attendance: 8,091; Referee: Simon Mather

1 November 2022 17	Tranmere Rovers	0–0	Stockport County	Birkenhead
19:45 GMT	O'Connor (yellow card) 34'	Report		Stadium: Prenton Park; Attendance: 6,800; Referee: Bobby Madden

12 November 2022 18	Newport County	1–2	Stockport County	Newport
15:00 GMT	Lewis 45' (yellow card) 67'; Drysdale (yellow card) 56'	Report	Hussey 54'; Madden 74'	Stadium: Rodney Parade; Attendance: 3,753; Referee: Andy Woolmer

19 November 2022 19	Stockport County	1–2	Leyton Orient	Edgeley
15:00 GMT	Hippolyte 5'	Report	Pratley 20', (yellow card) 65'; Beckles 67'; Brown (yellow card) 75'	Stadium: Edgeley Park; Attendance: 9,368; Referee: Seb Stockbridge

3 December 2022 20	Hartlepool United	0–5	Stockport County	Hartlepool
15:00 GMT		Report	Wootton 16', 20'; Hippolyte (yellow card) 24'; Croasdale (yellow card) 47'; Madden 61'; Camps 67'; Collar 85'	Stadium: Suit Direct Stadium; Attendance: 5,079; Referee: Ben Toner

10 December 2022	Rochdale	Postponed	Stockport County	Rochdale
15:00 GMT				Stadium: Crown Oil Arena
Note: Fixture was postponed due to a frozen pitch.

17 December 2022	Stockport County	Postponed	Gillingham	Edgeley
15:00 GMT				Stadium: Edgeley Park
Note: Fixture was postponed due to a frozen pitch.

26 December 2022 21	Stockport County	2–0	Crewe Alexandra	Edgeley
15:00 GMT	Madden 55'; Collar 68'	Report	Thomas (yellow card) 52'	Stadium: Edgeley Park; Attendance: 9,837; Referee: Martin Woods

29 December 2022 22	Walsall	0–2	Stockport County	Bescot
19:45 GMT	Gordon (yellow card) 21'; Kinsella (yellow card) 30'; White (yellow card) 89'	Report	Wootton 33', 65'; Brown (yellow card) 80'	Stadium: Poundland Bescot Stadium; Attendance: 6,455; Referee: Craig Hicks

1 January 2023 23	Grimsby Town	1–0	Stockport County	Cleethorpes
15:00 GMT	Khan 51'; Green (yellow card) 78'; Clifton (yellow card) 81'	Report		Stadium: Blundell Park; Attendance: 6,490; Referee: Adam Herczeg

14 January 2023 24	Stockport County	2–0	Northampton Town	Edgeley
15:00 GMT	Collar (yellow card) 24'; Sarcevic 33'; Sowerby 68' (o.g.)	Report	Pinnock (yellow card) 36'	Stadium: Edgeley Park; Attendance: 8,732; Referee: Rebecca Welch

21 January 2023	Crewe Alexandra	Postponed	Stockport County	Crewe
15:00 GMT				Stadium: Mornflake Stadium
Note: Fixture was postponed due to a frozen pitch.

24 January 2023 25	Stockport County	0–0	Bradford City	Edgeley
19:45 GMT	Rydel (yellow card) 86'	Report	Smallwood (yellow card) 87'	Stadium: Edgeley Park; Attendance: 8,991; Referee: Martin Coy

28 January 2023 26	AFC Wimbledon	1–0	Stockport County	Wimbledon
15:00 GMT	Pell (yellow card) 10', (goal) 49'; Woodyard (yellow card) 63'; Little (yellow card) 71'; Chislett (yellow card) 76'; Biler (yellow card) 87'	Report	Wright (yellow card) 16'; Hippolyte (penalty missed) 32'; Byrne (yellow card) 75'	Stadium: Cherry Red Records Stadium; Attendance: 8,511; Referee: James Oldham

31 January 2023 27	Crewe Alexandra	1–1	Stockport County	Crewe
19:45 GMT	O'Riordan 44'	Report	Wootton 48'; Rydel (yellow card) 84'; Byrne (yellow card) 86'	Stadium: Mornflake Stadium; Attendance: 5,877; Referee: Tom Reeves

4 February 2023 28	Stockport County	3–2	Tranmere Rovers	Edgeley
15:00 GMT	Knoyle 19'; Wootton 45+1'; Collar 78'	Report	Hemmings 41' (pen.); Davies (yellow card) 75'; Morris 84'	Stadium: Edgeley Park; Attendance: 10,231; Referee: Christopher Pollard

11 February 2023 29	Harrogate Town	1–3	Stockport County	Harrogate
15:00 GMT	Hinchliffe 63' (o.g.)	Report	Hippolyte 19'; Olaofe 34', (yellow card) 58'; Croasdale (yellow card) 60'; Collar 73'	Stadium: The EnviroVent Stadium; Attendance: 2,404; Referee: Darren Drysdale

14 February 2023 30	Stockport County	2–1	Crawley Town	Edgeley
19:45 GMT	Croasdale (yellow card) 8'; Wootton 12', 51'; Hippolyte (yellow card) 90'	Report	Powell 9'; Telford (yellow card) 56'	Stadium: Edgeley Park; Attendance: 7,020 (155 away); Referee: Andy Haines

18 February 2023 31	Stockport County	2–0	Stevenage	Edgeley
15:00 GMT	Collar 34'; Rydel 90+5'	Report	Gilbey (yellow card) 57'; Sweeney (yellow card) 76'; Smith (yellow card) 78'	Stadium: Edgeley Park; Attendance: 9,412 (270 away); Referee: Bobby Madden

21 February 2023 32	Rochdale	1–2	Stockport County	Rochdale
19:45 GMT	Rodney 85'; Lloyd (yellow card) 87'	Report	Knoyle (yellow card) 19'; Collar 56' (pen.), 58'	Stadium: Crown Oil Arena; Attendance: 4,604; Referee: Carl Boyeson

25 February 2023 33	Barrow	1–0	Stockport County	Barrow-in-Furness
15:00 GMT	Garner (yellow card) 45+1'; Kay 69'	Report	Stretton (yellow card) 90+5'	Stadium: So Legal Stadium; Attendance: 4,164 (625 away); Referee: Ollie Yates

5 March 2023 34	Stockport County	0–0	Doncaster Rovers	Edgeley
15:00 GMT	Davenport (yellow card) 9'; Rydel (yellow card) 65'	Report	Molyneux (yellow card) 81'; Close (yellow card) 90'	Stadium: Edgeley Park; Attendance: 9,942 (1,154 away); Referee: Robert Lewis

7 March 2023 35	Stockport County	0–0	Gillingham	Edgeley
19:45 GMT		Report	Jefferies (yellow card) 75'; Tutonda (yellow card) 77'	Stadium: Edgeley Park; Attendance: 8,168; Referee: Ben Toner

11 March 2023 36	Colchester United	0–1	Stockport County	Colchester
15:00 GMT	Kelleher (yellow card) 47'; Huws (yellow card) 78'	Report	Wootton 37'; Olaofe (yellow card) 87'; Johnson (yellow card) 89'	Stadium: JobServe Community Stadium; Attendance: 3,530 (473 away); Referee: Declan Bourne

18 March 2023 37	Stockport County	1–1	Mansfield Town	Edgeley
15:00 GMT	Madden 30'; Byrne (yellow card) 66'; Sarcevic (yellow card) 90+5'	Report	Akins 90+3'	Stadium: Edgeley Park; Attendance: 10,155 (1,407 away); Referee: Paul Howard

25 March 2023 38	Swindon Town	0–1	Stockport County	Swindon
15:00 GMT	Wakeling (red card) 1'; Hepburn-Murphy (yellow card) 3'; Brynn (yellow card) 60'; Williams (yellow card) 62'	Report	Madden (penalty missed) 2'; Rydel (yellow card) 45+4'; Lewis (yellow card) 48'; Knoyle (yellow card) 49'; Lemonheigh-Evans (yellow card) 64'; Croasdale 80'; Wootton (yellow card) 90+4'	Stadium: The County Ground; Attendance: 9,446 (712 away fans); Referee: Alan Young

31 March 2023 39	Stockport County	1–1	Salford City	Edgeley
19:45 BST	Lemonheigh-Evans 6'; Hussey (yellow card) 71'	Report	Hendry 51'; Mallan (yellow card) 67'	Stadium: Edgeley Park; Attendance: 10,305 (584 away); Referee: Adam Herczeg

7 April 2023 40	Sutton United	0–1	Stockport County	Sutton
15:00 BST	Smith (yellow card) 29'; Hart (yellow card) 83'	Report	Croasdale (yellow card) 28'; Stretton 53'; Collar (yellow card) 65'; Hippolyte (yellow card) 85'	Stadium: VBS Community Stadium; Attendance: 4,253 (702 away); Referee: Neil Hair

10 April 2023 41	Stockport County	4–0	Newport County	Edgeley
15:00 BST	Wootton 9', 45+3'; Stretton 65'; Knoyle 89'	Report	Norman (yellow card) 42'	Stadium: Edgeley Park; Attendance: 9,179 (344 away); Referee: Carl Brook

15 April 2023 42	Gillingham	1–1	Stockport County	Gillingham
15:00 BST	Masterson (yellow card) 16'; Ehmer (yellow card) 23'; Lapslie 54'; Alexander (yellow card) 84'; Dieng (yellow card) 87'	Report	Collar 89'; Knoyle (yellow card) 90'	Stadium: MEMS Priestfield Stadium; Attendance: 5,810 (519 away); Referee: Martin Woods

18 April 2023 43	Carlisle United	2–2	Stockport County	Carlisle
19:45 BST	Whelan (yellow card) 27'; Senior (yellow card) 41'; Mellish 54', (yellow card) 90+2'; Moxon 83'	Report	Hippolyte 31'; Wright (yellow card) 38'; Lemonheigh-Evans 86'	Stadium: Brunton Park; Attendance: 7,198 (1,052 away); Referee: Thomas Parsons

22 April 2023 44	Stockport County	1–0	Rochdale	Edgeley
15:00 BST	Olaofe 45+8'; Lemonheigh-Evans (yellow card) 52'; Byrne (yellow card) 65'	Report	Ebanks-Landell (yellow card) 59'	Stadium: Edgeley Park; Attendance: 10,319 (824 away); Referee: Scott Oldham

29 April 2023 45	Leyton Orient	0–3	Stockport County	Leyton
15:00 BST	Hunt (yellow card) 20'; Smyth (yellow card) 33'	Report	Wright 5'; Camps 10'; Hippolyte (yellow card) 45+2'; Lemonheigh-Evans 81'; Hussey (yellow card) 90+1'	Stadium: Brisbane Road; Attendance: 8,615 (1,214 away); Referee: Ollie Yates

8 May 2023 46	Stockport County	1–1	Hartlepool United	Stockport
12:30	Camps 39' (pen.)	Report	Cooke 62'	Stadium: Edgeley Park; Attendance: 10,118; Referee: Tom Reeves

=== League Two play-offs ===
13 May 2023 Semi-final 1st leg	Salford City	1–0	Stockport County	Salford
19:45 BST	Smith 17'	Report		Stadium: Moor Lane; Attendance: 3,923; Referee: Tom Nield

20 May 2023 Semi-final 2nd leg	Stockport County	2–1 (a.e.t.) (3–1 p)	Salford City	Stockport
12:30 BST	Olaofe 68'; Stretton 115'	Report	Mallan 112'	Stadium: Edgeley Park; Attendance: 10,023; Referee: Ben Toner
	Penalties
	Madden (penalty scored); Croasdale (penalty missed); Collar (penalty scored); Sarcevic (penalty scored)		(penalty missed) Lund; (penalty missed) Mariappa; (penalty scored) Barry; (penalty missed) Mallan

28 May 2023 Final	Stockport County	1–1 (a.e.t.) (4–5 p)	Carlisle United	Wembley Stadium, London
13:30 BST	Mellish 34' (o.g.)	Report	Patrick 84'	Attendance: 34,004; Referee: Tom Nield
	Penalties
	Lemonheigh-Evans (penalty scored); Rydel (penalty missed); Hippolyte (penalty scored); Stretton (penalty scored); Collar (penalty scored)		(penalty scored) Dennis; (penalty scored) Mellish; (penalty scored) Edmondson; (penalty scored) Moxon; (penalty scored) Charters

=== FA Cup ===
County were drawn at home to Swindon Town in the first round, away to Charlton Athletic in the second round and at home again to Walsall in the third round.

Win Draw Loss Fixtures

5 November 2022 First round	Stockport County	4–0	Swindon Town	Edgeley
15:00 GMT	Sarcevic 11', 29'; Wright 16'; Rydel 58'; Brown (yellow card) 79'	Report	Khan (yellow card) 1'; Hutton (yellow card) 29'; Reed (yellow card) 88'	Stadium: Edgeley Park; Attendance: 4,534; Referee: Marc Edwards

26 November 2022 Second round	Charlton Athletic	2–2	Stockport County	Charlton
15:00 GMT	Kirk (yellow card) 6'; Lewis 23' (o.g.); Morgan 39'	Report	Hussey 3'; Southam-Hales (yellow card) 52'; Horsfall (yellow card) 70'; Hippolyte 90+7'	Stadium: The Valley; Attendance: 3,889; Referee: Lee Swabey

7 December 2022 Second round replay	Stockport County	3–1	Charlton Athletic	Edgeley
19:45 GMT	Collar 25', 73', 81' (pen.); Rydel (yellow card) 66'	Report	Wright 7' (o.g.); Campbell (yellow card) 49'; Forster-Caskey (yellow card) 69'; Mitchell (yellow card) 77'; Dobson (yellow card) 80'; Clare (yellow card) 80'	Stadium: Edgeley Park; Attendance: 6,242; Referee: Scott Oldham

8 January 2023 Third round	Stockport County	1–2	Walsall	Edgeley
14:00 GMT	Madden 88', (yellow card) 90+4'	Report	Johnson 63'; Williams 90+5' (pen.)	Stadium: Edgeley Park; Attendance: 9,178; Referee: Andrew Kitchen

=== EFL Cup ===
Win Draw Loss Fixtures

Stockport County were drawn away to Harrogate Town in the first round and at home to Leicester City in the second round.

9 August 2022 First round	Harrogate Town	0–1	Stockport County	Harrogate
19:45 BST		Report	Croasdale (yellow card) 39'; Jennings 53' (pen.); Brown (yellow card) 70'; Hippolyte (yellow card) 90+2'	Stadium: The EnviroVent Stadium; Attendance: 1,534; Referee: Thomas Kirk

23 August 2022 Second round	Stockport County	0–0 (1–3 p)	Leicester City	Stockport
19:45 BST	Quigley (yellow card) 90+4'	Report		Stadium: Edgeley Park; Attendance: 10,301; Referee: Sam Barrott
	Penalties
	Sarcevic (penalty missed); Quigley (penalty scored); Croasdale (penalty missed); Wootton (penalty missed)		(penalty scored) Tielemans; (penalty missed) Maddison; (penalty scored) Barnes; (penalty missed) Pérez; (penalty scored) Dewsbury-Hall

=== EFL Trophy ===
On 20 June, the initial Group stage draw was made, grouping Stockport County with Shrewsbury Town and Port Vale. Three days later, Wolverhampton Wanderers U21s joined Northern Group C.

Pos	Div	Team	Pld	W	PW	PL	L	GF	GA	GD	Pts	Qualification
1	L1	Port Vale	3	3	0	0	0	7	0	+7	9	Advance to Round 2
2	ACA	Wolverhampton Wanderers U21	3	2	0	0	1	4	4	0	6	Advance to Round 2
3	L2	Stockport County	3	1	0	0	2	2	3	−1	3	
4	L1	Shrewsbury Town	3	0	0	0	3	1	7	−6	0	

Source: EFL.com

Win Draw Loss Fixtures

30 August 2022 Group stage	Port Vale	1–0	Stockport County	Burslem
19:30 BST	Hussey 64'; McDermott (yellow card) 83'	Report		Stadium: Vale Park; Attendance: 1,980; Referee: Seb Stockbridge

20 September 2022 Group stage	Stockport County	1–2	Wolverhampton Wanderers U21	Edgeley
19:30 BST	Lemonheigh-Evans (yellow card) 43'; Jennings 90+3'	Report	Harkin 20'; Roberts 71'	Stadium: Edgeley Park; Attendance: 1,398; Referee: Anthony Backhouse

18 October 2022 Group stage	Stockport County	1–0	Shrewsbury Town	Edgeley
19:30 BST	Johnson 2' (yellow card) 56'; Macdonald (yellow card) 48'	Report		Stadium: Edgeley Park; Attendance: 1,054; Referee: Lewis Smith
