= Ben Hinchliffe =

English footballer (born 1987)

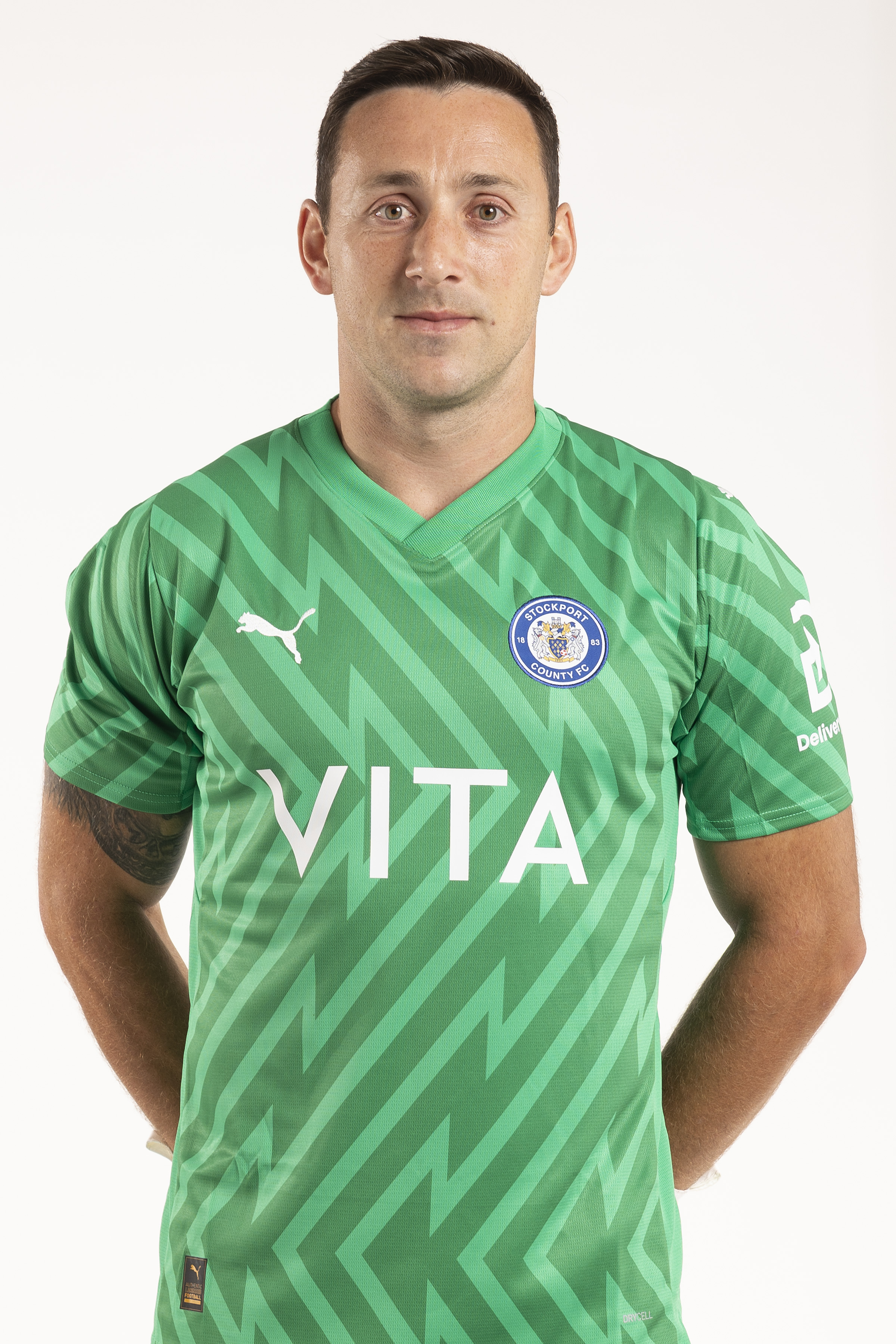
- Hinchliffe with Stockport County in 2023

Personal information
- Full name: Ben Hinchliffe
- Date of birth: 10 September 1987 (age 39)
- Place of birth: Preston, England
- Height: 6 ft 1 in (1.85 m)
- Position: Goalkeeper

Team information
- Current team: Stockport County
- Number: 1

Youth career
- 1997–2006: Preston North End

Senior career*
Years	Team	Apps	(Gls)
2006–2007	Preston North End	0	(0)
2006	→ Kendal Town (loan)		
2007	→ Tranmere Rovers (loan)	2	(0)
2007–2008	Derby County	0	(0)
2008–2009	Oxford United	7	(0)
2009	→ Worcester City (loan)		
2009	→ Kendal Town (loan)		
2009–2011	Bamber Bridge		
2011–2012	Northwich Victoria	42	(0)
2012–2016	AFC Fylde	76	(0)
2016–2026	Stockport County	361	(0)
Total		488	(0)
- * Club domestic league appearances and goals

Ben Hinchliffe (born 10 September 1987) is an English former professional goalkeeper who is head of goalkeeping at Stockport County

== Early life ==
Hinchliffe was born in Preston, Lancashire.

== Playing career ==
=== Preston North End ===
In April 2006, Hinchliffe was given a one-year professional contract with Preston North End after impressing in the youth and reserve teams. He was loaned out to Northern Premier League Premier Division club Kendal Town at the start of the 2006–07 season. Hinchliffe made 10 appearances, giving some impressive performances before returning to Deepdale in October 2006, and needed knee surgery after picking an injury.

=== Tranmere Rovers ===
On recovery, in February 2007, Hinchliffe joined League One team Tranmere Rovers on loan originally for one month as cover after John Achterberg picked up a knee injury, though this was twice extended, initially for another month and then until the end of the season. Hinchliffe made his Tranmere and Football League debut on 28 April 2007, as a 21st minute substitute in the 1–1 draw versus Crewe Alexandra, following fellow goalkeeper Gavin Ward's dismissal for handling outside the box., Hinchliffe made his full a week later in a 3–1 victory versus Brentford., his last game at the club. Upon his return to Preston, Hinchliffe was released, along with five other players, on 8 May 2007.

=== Derby County ===
On 10 July 2007, Hinchliffe joined newly promoted Premier League side Derby County on a two-year contract, teaming up with former Preston North End manager Billy Davies. He was released from his contract at the end of the 2007/08 season by new manager Paul Jewell.

=== Move into non-League ===
He subsequently joined Oxford United on non-contract terms. After leaving Oxford, Hinchliffe spent time playing for Worcester City and again for Kendal Town before joining Bamber Bridge. In June 2011 he joined Northwich Victoria. He moved on to AFC Fylde in May 2012.

=== Stockport County ===
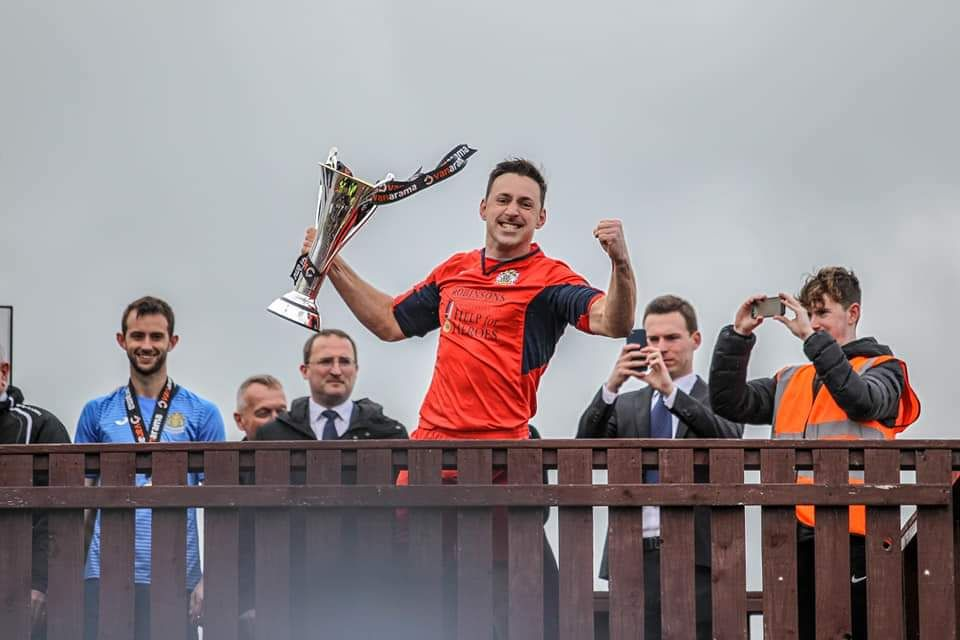
Ben Hinchliffe celebrating winning the National League North with Stockport County in 2019

In May 2016, Hinchliffe joined Stockport County and kept 29 clean sheets in his first two seasons with the club. Hinchliffe played every league match as County took the National League North title in 2018–19 and was selected in the league's team of the season. He remained number one choice at Edgeley Park throughout the entirety of County's 2nd stay in the National League. In the 2020–21 season Hinchliffe was selected in the National League team of the season, despite County missing out on promotion, losing in the play-offs to Hartlepool United. Hinchliffe was an integral part of County's title-winning season in 2021–22, a season in which he surpassed the 100 clean sheet barrier, becoming the first goalkeeper in the clubs history to reach such a milestone. He kept another 5 clean sheets as County secured the title with a 2–0 home win against FC Halifax Town.

At the start of the following season he was criticised by manager Dave Challinor for a poor performance after Stockport lost their first League Two game 3–2 at home to Barrow on 30 July 2022. After an injury to on-loan keeper Vítězslav Jaroš, Hinchliffe returned to keep five consecutive clean sheets to help County move clear of the bottom of the table in October. On 20 May 2023, he saved two penalties as Stockport defeated Salford City 3–1 on penalties to go through to the play-off final. During the 2022–23 season Hinchliffe played enough games to trigger an automatic one-year extension to his contract.

In the 2023–24 season Hinchliffe remained an integral part of County's team as the club clinched the EFL League Two title. In doing so, he became the first player in the club's history to win three separate league titles with Stockport. In the same period, Hinchliffe also became one of Stockport's all-time top appearance makers after partaking in his 339th game for the club in a 2–0 win against Forest Green Rovers. In May 2024 Hinchliffe signed a two-year contract extension with the club. He won the League Two golden glove having kept 17 clean sheets throughout the season and was later included in the division's PFA Team of the Year.

On 27 May 2026, the club announced Hinchliffe was being released.

On 24 June 2026, it was confirmed that Hinchliffe would retire from football.

== Coaching career ==
On 24 June 2026, it was announced that Hinchliffe would remain at Stockport County and become their Head of Goalkeeping.

== Career statistics ==
As of match played 31 January 2026

Appearances and goals by club, season and competition
Club	Season	League			FA Cup		League Cup		Other		Total	
Club	Season	Division	Apps	Goals	Apps	Goals	Apps	Goals	Apps	Goals	Apps	Goals
AFC Fylde	2014–15	Conference North	44	0	0	0	—		1 (Note: Appearances in the FA Trophy)	0	45	0
AFC Fylde	2015–16	National League North	32	0	2	0	—		3	0	37	0
AFC Fylde	Total		76	0	2	0	0	0	4	0	82	0
Stockport County	2016–17	National League North	39	0	4	0	—		4	0	47	0
Stockport County	2017–18	National League North	38	0	3	0	—		7	0	48	0
Stockport County	2018–19	National League North	42	0	5	0	—		8	0	55	0
Stockport County	2019–20	National League	38	0	1	0	—		3	0	42	0
Stockport County	2020–21	National League	42	0	5	0	—		1 (Note: One appearance in National League play-offs)	0	49	0
Stockport County	2021–22	National League	37	0	1	0	—		3	0	41	0
Stockport County	2022–23	League Two	36	0	4	0	0	0	6 (Note: Three appearances in EFL Trophy, three appearances in League Two play-offs)	0	46	0
Stockport County	2023–24	League Two	46	0	2	0	1	0	0	0	49	0
Stockport County	2024–25	League One	19	0	1	0	1	0	2 (Note: Appearances in EFL Trophy)	0	23	0
Stockport County	2025–26	League One	21	0	0	0	2	0	1	0	24	0
Stockport County	Total		357	0	26	0	4	0	36	0	423	0
Career total			433	0	28	0	4	0	40	0	505	0

== Honours ==
Stockport County

- EFL League Two: 2023–24
- National League: 2021–22
- National League North: 2018–19
- EFL Trophy runner-up: 2025–26

Individual

- Conference North Team of the Year: 2014–15
- National League North Team of the Year: 2018–19
- National League Team of the Year: 2020–21
- PFA Team of the Year: 2023–24 League Two
- Most appearances for Stockport County as a goalkeeper
