= Macauley Southam-Hales =

Welsh footballer (born 1996)

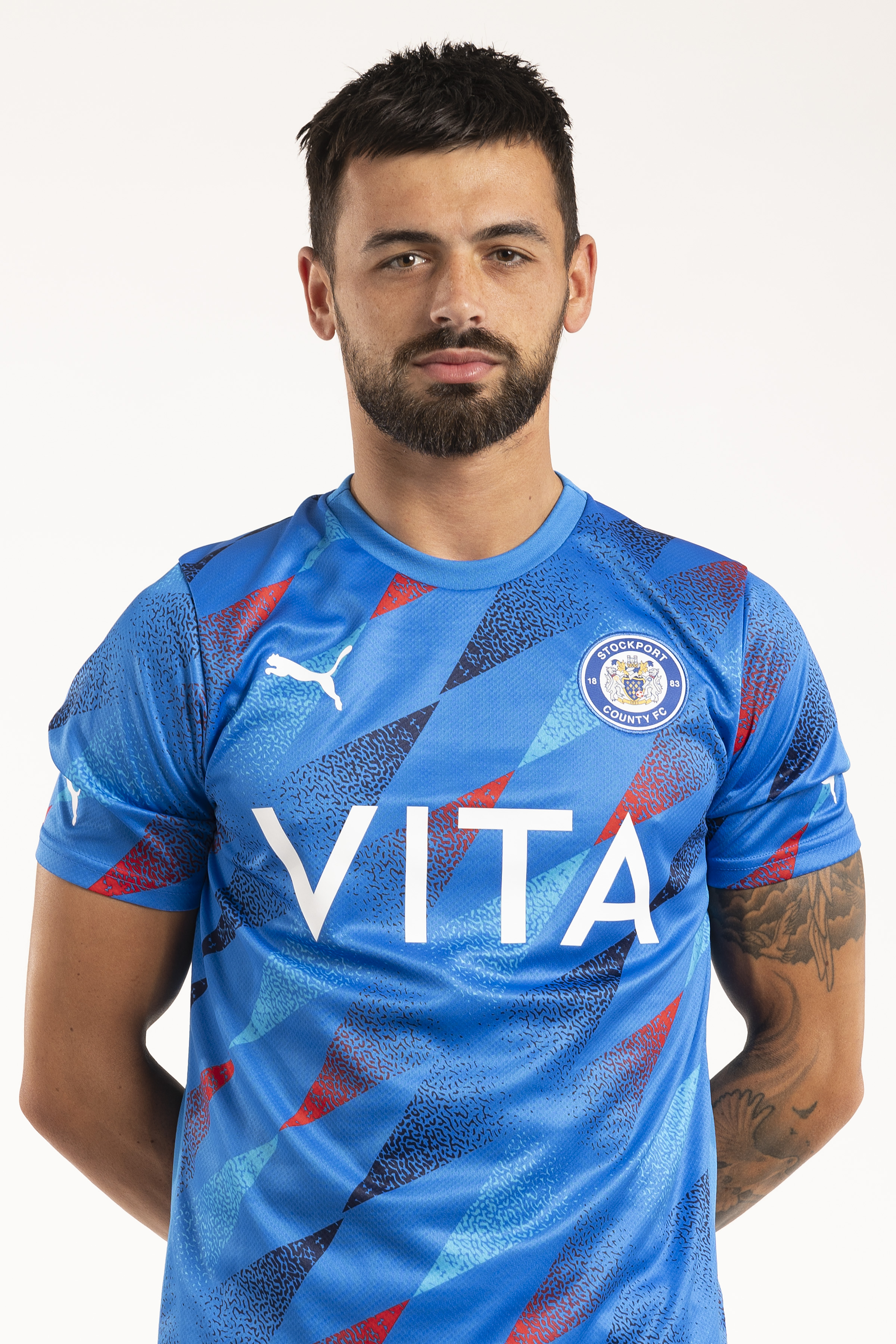
- Southam-Hales with Stockport County

Personal information
- Full name: Macauley Anthony Southam-Hales
- Date of birth: 2 February 1996 (age 30)
- Place of birth: Cardiff, Wales
- Height: 1.75 m (5 ft 9 in)
- Position: Right back

Team information
- Current team: Bristol Rovers
- Number: 23

Youth career
- 2005–2017: Cardiff City

Senior career*
Years	Team	Apps	(Gls)
2017–2019	Barry Town United	49	(4)
2019–2020	Fleetwood Town	2	(0)
2020	→ Hartlepool United (loan)	7	(0)
2020–2025	Stockport County	105	(5)
2025–	Bristol Rovers	16	(1)
- * Club domestic league appearances and goals as of 21:20, 10 November 2026 (UTC)

Macauley Anthony Southam-Hales (born 2 February 1996) is a Welsh professional footballer who plays as a right back for EFL League Two club Bristol Rovers.

== Career ==
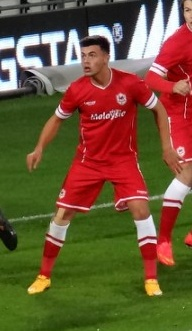
Southam-Hales playing for Cardiff City's development team in 2014.

=== Fleetwood Town ===
After playing for Cardiff City and Barry Town United, Southam-Hales signed for Fleetwood Town in January 2019. In January 2020 he moved on loan to Hartlepool United. After returning to Fleetwood following the loan spell, Southam-Hales was a late substitute in the League One play-off tie against Wycombe Wanderers.

=== Stockport County ===
In September 2020, Southam-Hales signed for National League side Stockport County. In December 2022 he was injured during a FA Cup match; footage of the incident was used by the Football Association in a TikTok, for which they later apologised. He was given the all clear after going to hospital. The Professional Footballers Association called for changes to safety rules following the incident. In February 2024, Southam-Hales suffered a rupture to his patella tendon, ruling him out for up to nine months. In May 2024, he signed a new one-year deal.

Following the conclusion of the 2024–25 season, the club confirmed that they were still in conversation with Southam-Hales regarding a new contract. On 20 June, it was confirmed that he would depart the club at the end of the month following the expiration of his contract.

=== Bristol Rovers ===
On 25 June 2025, Southam-Hales agreed to join recently relegated League Two club Bristol Rovers on a two-year deal from 1 July. On 30 August 2025, he scored his first goal for the club with the only goal in an away victory over Grimsby Town, his volley from the edge of the box being nominated for League Two Goal of the Month. In November 2025, a reckless tackle from Notts County winger Tyrese Hall saw Southam-Hales forced off with injury, ruling hin out for the majority of the season. Having failed to make another appearance in the 2025–26 season, he was one of seven players to be made available to depart the club in May 2026.

== Career statistics ==
As of match played 10 October 2026

Appearances and goals by club, season and competition
Club	Season	League			National Cup		League Cup		Other		Total	
Club	Season	Division	Apps	Goals	Apps	Goals	Apps	Goals	Apps	Goals	Apps	Goals
Barry Town	2017–18	Welsh Premier League	28	3	1	1	0	0	0	0	29	4
Barry Town	2018–19	Welsh Premier League	21	1	1	0	0	0	0	0	22	1
Barry Town	Total		49	4	2	1	0	0	0	0	51	5
Fleetwood Town	2018–19	League One	1	0	0	0	0	0	0	0	1	0
Fleetwood Town	2019–20	League One	1	0	0	0	0	0	3 (Note: Appearances in EFL Trophy and EFL League One play-offs)	0	4	0
Fleetwood Town	Total		2	0	0	0	0	0	3	0	5	0
Hartlepool United (loan)	2019–20	National League	7	0	0	0	0	0	0	0	7	0
Stockport County	2020–21	National League	28	2	2	0	0	0	3 (Note: Two appearances in the FA Trophy and one appearance in the National League play-offs.)	0	33	2
Stockport County	2021–22	National League	30	0	3	0	0	0	0	0	33	0
Stockport County	2022–23	League Two	9	0	3	0	0	0	1 (Note: Appearance(s) in the EFL Trophy.)	0	13	0
Stockport County	2023–24	League Two	21	0	2	0	1	0	0	0	24	0
Stockport County	2024–25	League One	17	3	3	0	0	0	0	0	20	3
Stockport County	Total		105	5	13	0	1	0	4	0	123	5
Bristol Rovers	2025–26	League Two	15	1	0	0	1	0	0	0	16	1
Bristol Rovers	2026–27	League Two	1	0	0	0	1	0	3	0	5	0
Bristol Rovers	Total		16	1	0	0	2	0	3	0	21	1
Career total			179	10	15	1	3	0	10	0	207	11

== Honours ==
Stockport County

- EFL League Two: 2023–24
- National League: 2021–22
