= Ryan Rydel =

English footballer (born 2001)

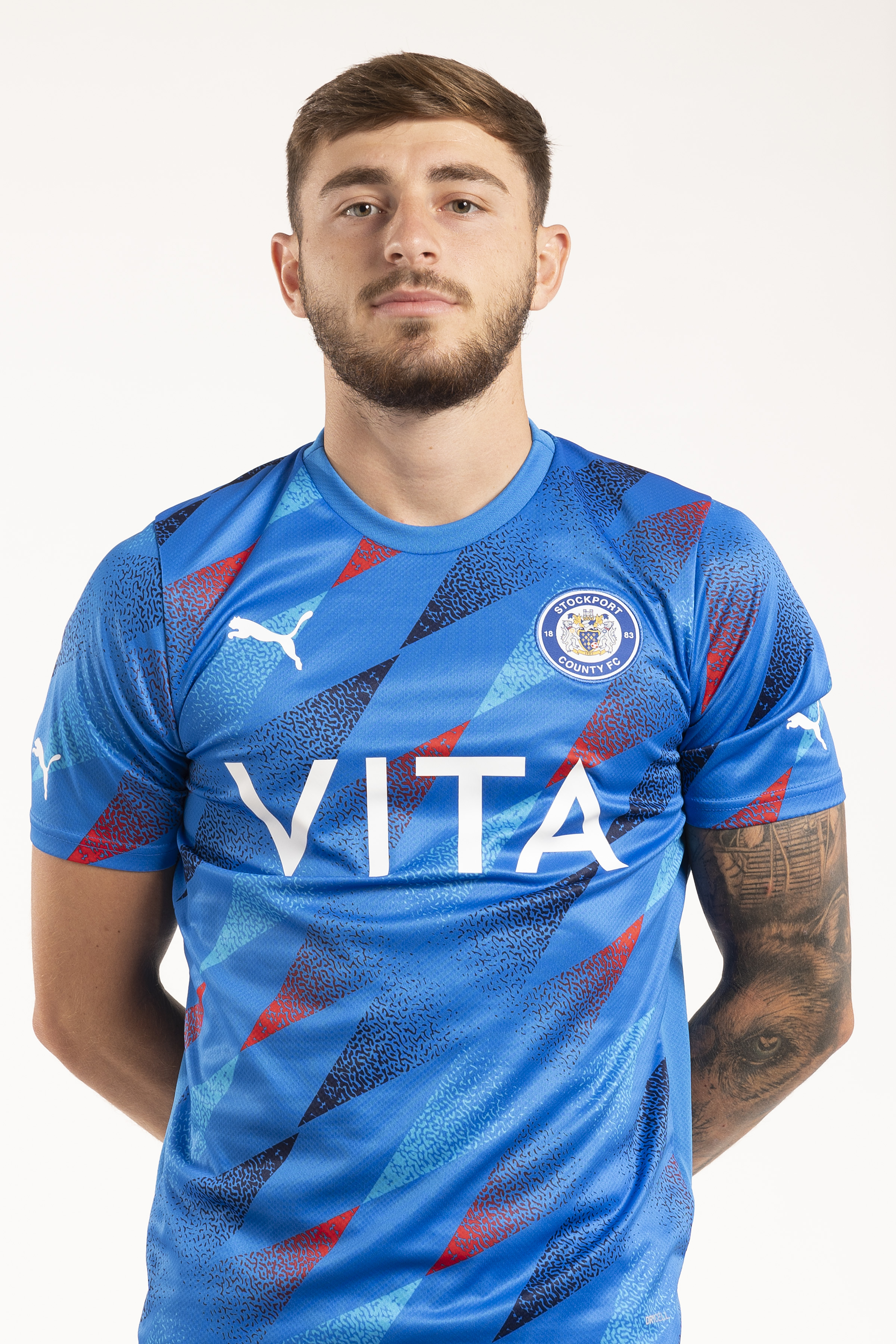
- Rydel with Stockport County.

Personal information
- Full name: Ryan Steven Rydel
- Date of birth: 9 February 2001 (age 25)
- Place of birth: Oldham, England
- Height: 1.81 m (5 ft 11 in)
- Positions: Left back; midfielder

Team information
- Current team: Forest Green Rovers (on loan from Stockport County)
- Number: 34

Youth career
- –2018: Fleetwood Town

Senior career*
Years	Team	Apps	(Gls)
2018–2021	Fleetwood Town	13	(0)
2020	→ Lancaster City (loan)	5	(1)
2021–	Stockport County	85	(5)
2025–2026	→ Exeter City (loan)	14	(0)
2026–	→ Forest Green Rovers (loan)	0	(0)
- * Club domestic league appearances and goals as of 13:35, 9 November 2026 (UTC)

Ryan Steven Rydel (born 9 February 2001) is an English professional footballer who plays as a left back or midfielder for National League club Forest Green Rovers, on loan from EFL League One club Stockport County.

== Career ==
=== Fleetwood Town ===
Rydel began his career with Fleetwood Town, turning professional in October 2018 at the age of 17. In March 2019, following his first first-team start, Rydel was praised by manager Joey Barton.

In February 2020, he joined Lancaster City on loan for the remainder of the season.

=== Stockport County ===
On 22 April 2021, Rydel signed for National League side Stockport County for an undisclosed fee.

In May 2024, following a League Two title-winning campaign, Rydel signed a new three-year deal with the club.

On 25 June 2025, Rydel joined fellow League One side Exeter City on a season-long loan deal.

On 5 November 2026, Rydel joined National League side Forest Green Rovers on loan until January.

== Career statistics ==
As of match played 7 November 2026

Appearances and goals by club, season and competition
Club	Season	League			FA Cup		League Cup		Other		Total	
Club	Season	Division	Apps	Goals	Apps	Goals	Apps	Goals	Apps	Goals	Apps	Goals
Fleetwood Town	2018–19	League One	6	0	0	0	0	0	1 (Note: Appearance(s) in the EFL Trophy.)	0	7	0
Fleetwood Town	2019–20	League One	0	0	0	0	0	0	1	0	1	0
Fleetwood Town	2020–21	League One	7	0	0	0	0	0	4	0	11	0
Fleetwood Town	Total		13	0	0	0	0	0	6	0	19	0
Lancaster City (loan)	2019–20	NPL Premier Division	5	1	—		—		1 (Note: Appearance in the Lancashire FA Challenge Trophy.)	0	6	1
Stockport County	2020–21	National League	3	0	—		—		0	0	3	0
Stockport County	2021–22	National League	32	2	3	0	0	0	0	0	35	2
Stockport County	2022–23	League Two	26	2	4	1	1	0	4 (Note: One appearance in the EFL Trophy, three appearances in the playoffs)	0	35	3
Stockport County	2023–24	League Two	6	1	0	0	1	0	1	0	8	1
Stockport County	2024–25	League One	17	0	2	0	0	0	3 (Note: One appearance in the EFL Trophy, two appearances in the playoffs)	0	22	0
Stockport County	2025–26	League One	0	0	0	0	0	0	0	0	0	0
Stockport County	2026–27	League One	1	0	0	0	1	0	2	0	4	0
Stockport County	Total		85	5	9	1	3	0	10	0	107	6
Exeter City (loan)	2025–26	League One	14	0	0	0	1	0	1	0	16	0
Forest Green Rovers (loan)	2026–27	National League	0	0	1	0	—		0	0	1	0
Career total			117	6	10	1	4	0	18	0	149	7

== Honours ==
Stockport County

- National League: 2021–22
- EFL League Two: 2023–24
