= Will Collar =

English footballer (born 1997)

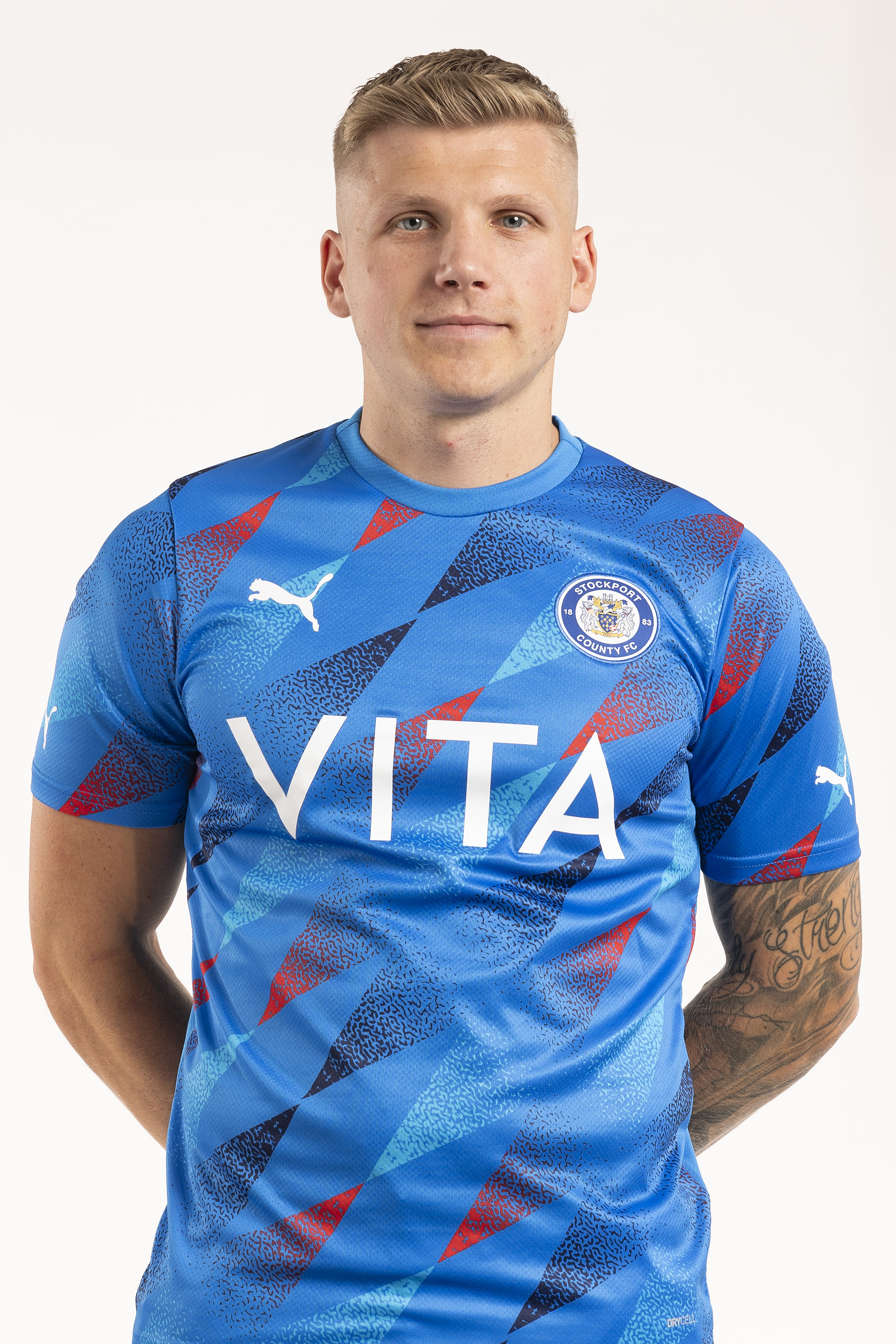
- Will Collar

Personal information
- Full name: William Guy Collar
- Date of birth: 3 February 1997 (age 29)
- Place of birth: Horsham, England
- Height: 5 ft 10 in (1.78 m)
- Position: Central midfielder

Team information
- Current team: Burton Albion (on loan from Milton Keynes Dons)
- Number: 14

Youth career
- –2018: Brighton & Hove Albion

Senior career*
Years	Team	Apps	(Gls)
2018–2019	Brighton & Hove Albion	0	(0)
2019–2021	Hamilton Academical	22	(1)
2021–2025	Stockport County	163	(36)
2025–	Milton Keynes Dons	22	(2)
2026–	→ Burton Albion (loan)	0	(0)
- * Club domestic league appearances and goals as of 12:38, 14 August 2026 (UTC)

William Guy Collar (born 3 February 1997) is an English professional footballer who plays as a central midfielder for EFL League One club Burton Albion, on loan from fellow EFL League One club Milton Keynes Dons.

== Career ==
=== Brighton & Hove Albion ===
Collar made his debut for Brighton on 28 August 2018, in a EFL Cup second round home tie against Southampton, playing the full match in a 30–0 defeat to their south-coast rivals.

=== Hamilton Academical ===
In June 2019 he joined Scottish Premiership club Hamilton Academical on a permanent deal. Mid-way through his second season with the club, Collar departed Hamilton Academical via mutual consent in February 2021.

=== Stockport County ===
On 4 February 2021, Collar joined National League club Stockport County on a contract until the end of the season. In May 2021 Will penned a new two-year deal with Stockport until the end of the 2022–23 season. On 15 May 2022 Collar scored the second of the match and final goal of the season in a 2–0 win over FC Halifax Town to help Stockport secure promotion and a return to the Football League for the first time in 11 years gaining promotion as National League Champions. Will signed a new three-year deal keeping him at Stockport until the end of the 2024–25 season.

On 7 December 2022, Collar scored his first professional hat-trick as Stockport beat League One side Charlton Athletic 3–1 in an FA Cup second round replay at Edgeley Park.

Collar scored 14 goals in 43 appearances in 2022, almost averaging a goal every 3 games.

Collar appeared as a substitute and scored a shoot-out penalty in the League Two play-off final played at Wembley on 28 May 2023, as Stockport lost on penalties to Carlisle United.

Collar played 20 times for Stockport in the League Two title winning season in 2023/24 scoring 4 goals, and was a key player in the record equalling run of 12 consecutive victories before suffering a hamstring injury. Having made his return in February, his season ended prematurely following a crude challenge by a Gillingham defender causing a high ankle strain.

Collar made 46 appearances for Stockport in 2024/25 including 38 league starts helping County to finish 3rd in League One - their highest finish for 30 years. He scored 9 times including the 3rd goal in their comeback at Wycombe on the last day of the season.

On 9 June 2025, Stockport announced Collar would leave the club once his contract expired.

=== Milton Keynes Dons ===
On 30 June 2025, Collar signed for League Two club Milton Keynes Dons on a contract effective from 1 July 2025. He made his debut for the club on 2 August 2025, the opening day of the 2025–26 season, in a 0-0 home draw with Oldham Athletic.

On 26 December 2026, Collar suffered a hamstring injury in a 1-0 home win over Swindon Town, which effectively ruled him out for the remainder of the season. Despite a frustrating first season, Collar went on to achieve a second-placed finish and promotion with the club to League One, having featured 22 times and scoring two goals.

==== Burton Albion (loan) ====
On 14 August 2026, Collar joined fellow League One club Burton Albion on a season-long loan deal.

== Career statistics ==
As of 26 December 2025

Appearances and goals by club, season and competition
Club	Season	League			FA Cup		League Cup		Other		Total	
Club	Season	Division	Apps	Goals	Apps	Goals	Apps	Goals	Apps	Goals	Apps	Goals
Brighton & Hove Albion	2018–19	Premier League	0	0	0	0	1	0	—		1	0
Hamilton Academical	2019–20	Scottish Premiership	16	1	2	0	1	0	2 (Note: Appearance(s) in the Scottish Challenge Cup)	0	21	1
Hamilton Academical	2020–21	Scottish Premiership	6	0	0	0	0	0	—		6	0
Hamilton Academical	Total		22	1	2	0	1	0	2	0	27	1
Stockport County	2020–21	National League	14	1	0	0	0	0	1 (Note: Appearance in the National League play-offs)	0	15	1
Stockport County	2021–22	National League	36	9	3	0	0	0	2 (Note: Appearance(s) in the FA Trophy)	2	41	11
Stockport County	2022–23	League Two	41	12	4	3	0	0	1 (Note: Appearance(s) in the EFL Trophy)	0	46	15
Stockport County	2023–24	League Two	20	4	1	0	1	0	0	0	22	4
Stockport County	2024–25	League One	42	8	4	1	1	0	0	0	46	9
Stockport County	Total		153	34	12	4	2	0	4	2	171	40
Milton Keynes Dons	2025–26	League Two	22	2	0	0	0	0	0	0	22	2
Milton Keynes Dons	2026–27	League One	0	0	0	0	0	0	0	0	0	0
Milton Keynes Dons	Total		22	2	0	0	0	0	0	0	22	2
Burton Albion (loan)	2026–27	League One	0	0	0	0	—		0	0	0	0
Career total			197	34	14	4	3	0	6	2	220	43

== Honours ==
Stockport County

- EFL League Two: 2023–24
- National League: 2021–22

Milton Keynes Dons

- EFL League Two runner-up: 2025–26
