= Cody Johnson (footballer) =

English footballer (born 2004)

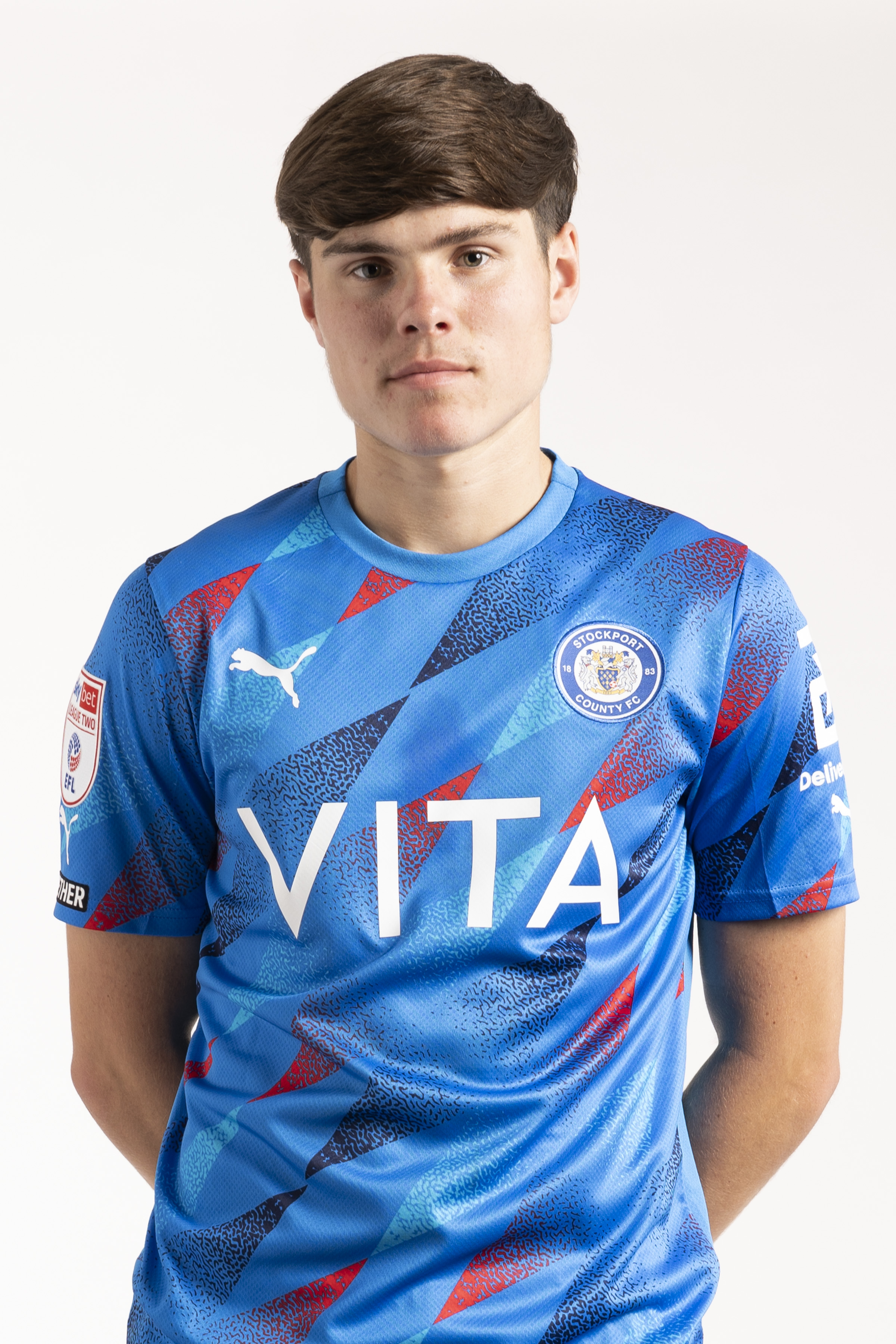
- Cody Johnson, Stockport County FC

Personal information
- Full name: Cody Lee Johnson
- Date of birth: 3 October 2004 (age 22)
- Place of birth: Oldham, England
- Height: 1.76 m (5 ft 9 in)
- Position: Midfielder

Team information
- Current team: FC Halifax Town
- Number: 30

Youth career
- –2021: Stockport County

Senior career*
Years	Team	Apps	(Gls)
2021–2025	Stockport County	14	(0)
2021	→ Stockport Town (loan)		
2023	→ Banbury United (loan)	19	(0)
2023	→ Rochdale (loan)	0	(0)
2024	→ Scarborough Athletic (loan)	7	(0)
2024–2025	→ Kings Lynn Town (loan)	37	(0)
2025–	FC Halifax Town	0	(0)
- * Club domestic league appearances and goals as of 18:36, 29 June 2025 (UTC)

Cody Lee Johnson (born 3 October 2004) is an English professional footballer who plays as a midfielder for National League club FC Halifax Town.

== Career ==
In April 2022, Johnson signed a professional two-year contract with Stockport County at the age of seventeen, having already featured for the club in the FA Trophy in a game against Cheshunt where he was named as man of the match; academy manager Damien Allen said that "he has a bright future ahead of him". He had earlier spent time on loan at Stockport Town in the North West Counties League Division One South. He made his first appearance of the 2022–23 season on 20 September 2022, in a 2–1 defeat to Wolverhampton Wanderers U21 in an EFL Trophy fixture at Edgeley Park. In January 2023, he joined National League North club Banbury United, remaining with the club on loan until the end of the season.

On 16 June 2023, Johnson signed for newly relegated National League club Rochdale on a season-long loan deal. On 7 August 2023, Johnson was recalled by Stockport County. On 29 February 2024, he joined National League North side Scarborough Athletic on loan for the remainder of the season.

On 6 August 2024, Johnson signed for National League North club King's Lynn Town on loan until 1 January 2025.

On 20 May 2025, Stockport announced he would be leaving in June when his contract expired.

On 27 June 2025, Johnson joined National League side FC Halifax Town, seeing him reunite with former King's Lynn Town manager Adam Lakeland.

== Career statistics ==
As of end of 2022–23 season

Appearances and goals by club, season and competition
Club	Season	League			FA Cup		EFL Cup		Other		Total	
Club	Season	Division	Apps	Goals	Apps	Goals	Apps	Goals	Apps	Goals	Apps	Goals
Stockport County	2021–22	National League	0	0	0	0	0	0	2 (Note: Includes appearance/s in the FA Trophy)	0	2	0
Stockport County	2022–23	EFL League Two	0	0	1	0	0	0	2 (Note: Includes appearance/s in the EFL Trophy)	0	3	0
Stockport County	Total		0	0	1	0	0	0	4	0	5	0
Banbury United (loan)	2022–23	National League North	19	0	0	0	—		1	0	20	0
Career total			19	0	1	0	0	0	5	0	25	0

== Honors ==
Stockport County

- EFL League Two: 2023–24
