= Jack Stretton =

Scottish footballer (born 2001)

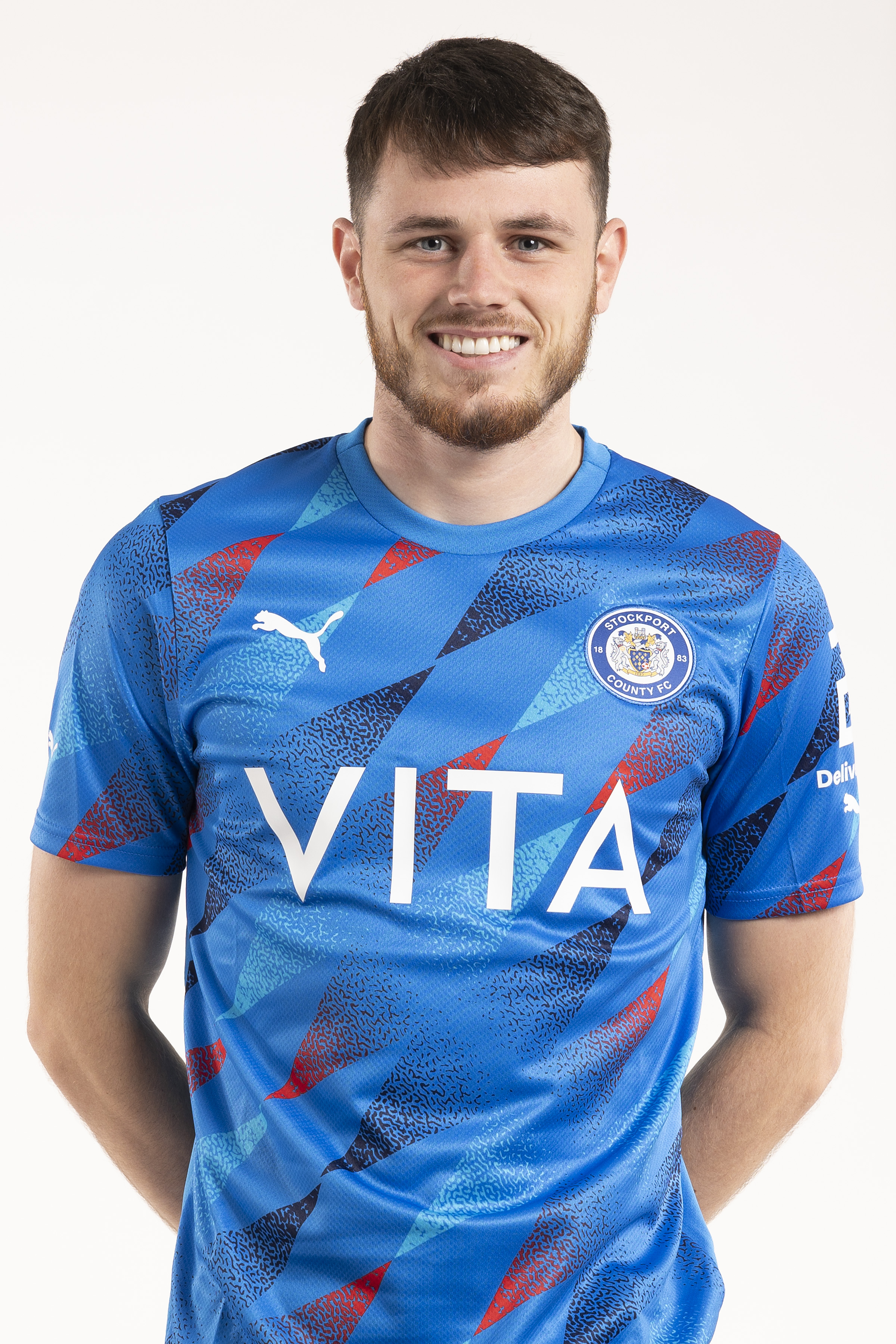
- Jack Stretton

Personal information
- Full name: Jack Kirk Stretton
- Date of birth: 6 September 2001 (age 25)
- Place of birth: Newhall, England
- Position: Forward

Team information
- Current team: Truro City

Youth career
- –2014: Nottingham Forest
- 2014–2020: Derby County

Senior career*
Years	Team	Apps	(Gls)
2020–2023	Derby County	13	(1)
2021	→ Stockport County (loan)	5	(3)
2022–2023	→ Carlisle United (loan)	18	(2)
2023–2025	Stockport County	18	(2)
2024	→ Oldham Athletic (loan)	1	(0)
2024	→ Woking (loan)	6	(0)
2025	Burton Albion	3	(0)
2025	Morecambe	0	(0)
2025	Drogheda United	6	(0)
2026–	Truro City	0	(2)

International career^{‡}
2020	Scotland U19	2	(0)
- * Club domestic league appearances and goals as of 14:10, 5 January 2026 (UTC) ‡ National team caps and goals as of 19:30, 28 November 2020 (UTC)

Jack Kirk Stretton (born 6 September 2001) is a professional footballer who plays as a forward for National League club Truro City.

== Club career ==
=== Derby County ===
Stretton made his debut for Derby County as a substitute in a 1–1 draw with Wycombe Wanderers on 28 November 2020.

On 8 March 2021, Stretton joined National League side Stockport County on loan for a month. On 9 March 2021, Stretton came off the bench to score on his debut in 5–0 away win against Solihull Moors.

He scored his first goal for Derby in a 2–1 loss at Peterborough United on 14 August 2021.

On 4 August 2022, Stretton joined EFL League Two club Carlisle United on a season-long loan deal.

=== Stockport County ===
On 7 January 2023, Stretton was recalled from his loan at Carlisle to allow him to return to Stockport County for an undisclosed fee on a two-and-a-half-year deal.

In July 2023, manager Dave Challinor revealed that Stretton had suffered an ACL injury and would therefore miss the majority of the 2023–24 season.

On 27 September 2024, Stretton joined National League side Oldham Athletic on a short-term loan until January 2025. Having struggled for game time, he was recalled on 24 October 2024, joining Woking on a one-month loan the following week. He was recalled by Stockport County on 31 December 2024. Stretton departed the club on 31 January 2025.

=== Burton Albion ===
On 28 February 2025, Stretton joined League One side Burton Albion on a short-term deal until the end of the season. He departed the club at the end of his short-term deal.

=== Morecambe ===
On 19 June 2025, Stretton joined National League side Morecambe as manager Derek Adams' first signing of the summer.

=== Drogheda United ===
On 28 August 2025, Stratton signed for League of Ireland Premier Division club Drogheda United until the end of their season in November.

=== Truro City ===
On 15 January 2026, Stretton signed for National League side Truro City.

== International career ==
Stretton has represented Scotland at U19 level.

== Career statistics ==
As of match played on 1 November 2025

Appearances and goals by club, season and competition
Club	Season	League			National Cup		League Cup		Other		Total	
Club	Season	Division	Apps	Goals	Apps	Goals	Apps	Goals	Apps	Goals	Apps	Goals
Derby County	2020–21	Championship	4	0	0	0	0	0	—		4	0
Derby County	2021–22	Championship	9	1	1	0	2	0	—		12	1
Derby County	2022–23	League One	0	0	0	0	0	0	0	0	0	0
Derby County	Total		13	1	1	0	2	0	0	0	16	1
Stockport County (loan)	2020–21	National League	5	3	0	0	—		0	0	5	3
Carlisle United (loan)	2022–23	League Two	18	2	1	0	1	0	3 (Note: Appearance(s) in EFL Trophy)	0	23	2
Stockport County	2022–23	League Two	16	2	0	0	0	0	3 (Note: Appearance(s) in EFL League Two play-offs)	1	19	3
Stockport County	2023–24	League Two	0	0	0	0	0	0	0	0	0	0
Stockport County	2024–25	League One	2	0	0	0	0	0	1	2	3	2
Stockport County	Total		23	5	0	0	0	0	4	3	27	8
Oldham Athletic (loan)	2024–25	National League	1	0	0	0	0	0	0	0	1	0
Woking (loan)	2024–25	National League	6	0	1	0	0	0	2 (Note: Appearance(s) in National League Cup)	1	9	1
Burton Albion	2024–25	League One	3	0	0	0	0	0	0	0	3	0
Morecambe	2025–26	National League	0	0	—		—		—		0	0
Drogheda United	2025	LOI Premier Division	6	0	1	0	—		1 (Note: Appearance(s) in Leinster Senior Cup)	0	8	0
Career total			70	8	4	0	3	0	10	4	87	12

== Honours ==
Stockport County

- EFL League Two: 2023–24
