= History of Stockport County F.C. =

History of an English football club

Stockport County F.C. is an association football club based in Stockport, Cheshire, England.

Formed in 1883 as Heaton Norris Rovers, they were renamed Stockport County in 1890 after the County Borough of Stockport and nicknamed "The Hatters" after the town's former hat-making industry. Stockport have played at Edgeley Park since 1902.

Stockport first joined the Football League in 1900 but had to seek re-election in 1904. The club were not re-elected and spent one season outside the competition before they returned for the 1905–06 season. County then played in the Football League continuously for 106 years until 2011, mostly in the lower divisions. The team won their first league championship in 1922, the newly created Third Division North. Two league championships followed in 1937 (Third Division North) and 1967 (Fourth Division). The 1990s was the team's most successful period, when Stockport competed in the First Division for five seasons and reached the League Cup semi-finals in 1996–97. County also made four appearances at Wembley Stadium during this period, two in the Football League Trophy and two in the Football League play-offs, but lost on each occasion.

After financial difficulties in the early 2000s, the club fell back down the divisions, and were relegated out of the Football League at the end of the 2010–11 season, followed by relegation to the sixth tier in 2012–13. Stockport stabilised on and off the pitch in the following seasons, and won promotion to the fifth tier in 2018–19. In 2021–22, County topped the National League, securing promotion back to the EFL after an 11-year absence, and in 2023, returned to Wembley for the 2023 EFL League Two play-off final.

== Football League years ==
=== 1883–1930 ===
Stockport County was formed in Heaton Norris in 1883 as Heaton Norris Rovers at McLaughlin's Cafe, by a group of pupils (Note: The pupils were: Tom Richards aged 19, Jack Hewitt, 18, Samuel Riley, 14, William Riley (brother of Samuel), 16, Tom Machin, 16, Stan Hockenhull, 17, Ted Whittle, 15, William Ridgway, 15, Ted Simpson, 16, and Ben Kelly, 15.) from Stockport Sunday School who were also members of the Wycliffe Congregational Church. Heaton Norris Rovers played their first recorded game in October 1884, a friendly at home against Stalybridge, which they lost 3–0. The club adopted The Hatters as their nickname, owing to Stockport's history as the centre of the Victorian hat-making industry, a nickname that is shared with Luton Town. Heaton Norris Rovers adopted the name Stockport County in 1890 after the County Borough of Stockport. After playing home matches for several years in different parks in the area, Heaton Norris Rovers moved to Green Lane in 1889. This is recognised as the first official home ground of the team. The team played in the Lancashire League and in local cup competitions until 1900, when they gained admission to the Football League Second Division. In 1894, Stockport qualified for the first round proper of the FA Cup for the first time in their history—the first Lancashire Combination club to reach this stage. They were eliminated after a 1–0 home defeat to Burton Wanderers. Fred Stewart became Stockport's first manager on the club's admittance to the Football League. He was previously involved in the administrative side from its inception in 1883. Stockport's first Football League match was against Leicester Fosse, which ended in a 2–2 draw.

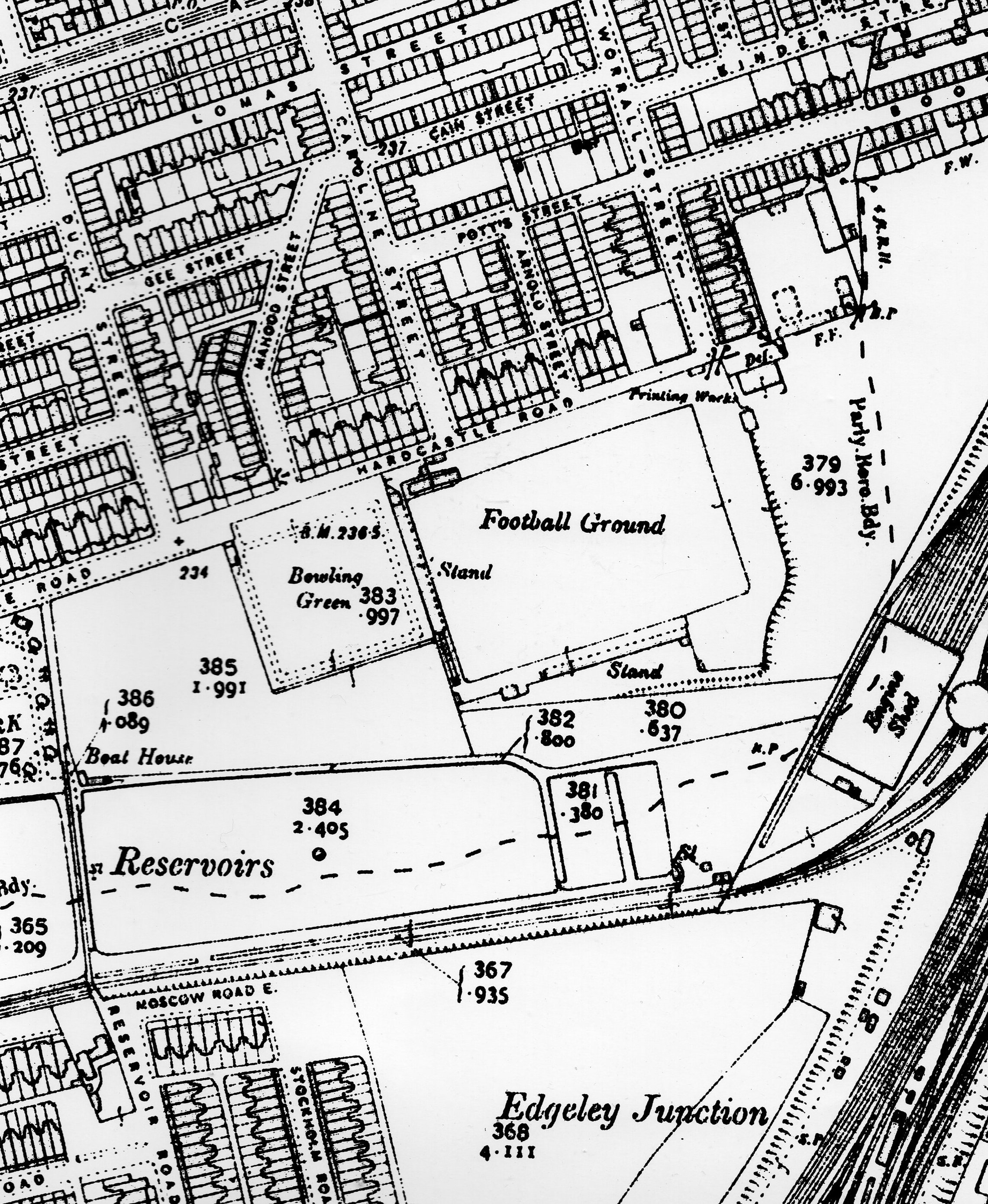
1910 Cheshire Ordnance Survey map showing Edgeley Park and surrounding area

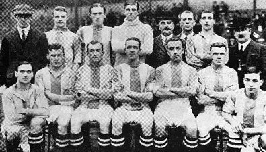
Photo of the 1913–14 Stockport County team

In 1901, the first black professional footballer Arthur Wharton, who was 36 at the time, signed for Stockport and made six appearances before retiring from football in 1902. Stockport left their Green Lane home in 1902 and moved to their current home, Edgeley Park, which at the time of the move was home to Stockport RFC until they folded a few years later. Stockport finished in the bottom three for their first four seasons. The team considered rejoining the Lancashire Combination because of their financial position in 1902, and at the end of 1903–04 season they failed to gain re-election. They spent one year in the Lancashire Combination. A league which they won. At the end of the season, they were re-admitted to the Football League, having been re-elected after a second voting ballot. In their first season back in the Football League, Stockport had intentions of having a first-class team, regardless of expense, by paying wages and advertising for a professional trainer. They finished the league in 10th position. During the early part of the 1908–09 season, the Stockport County board issued a prospectus for the club to become a 'limited liability company' which was confirmed in October 1908. Stockport remained in the Second Division of the Football League for seven years until the 1912–13 season, when they again had to seek re-election. Stockport gained 22 votes and retained their football league status.

During this time Stockport used friendly and charity matches to scout potential new players, David Ashworth was appointed as the team's first manager in 1914. After the outbreak of World War I, competitive football was suspended. Stockport did however complete in the Lancashire section of the Wartime Football League which was played from 1915–16 to 1918–19. The FA Cup was suspended until after the war. Many clubs were without their best players, however Stockport were quite fortunate in being able to regularly rely on many players who had featured in the previous season. Stockport's best placed finish during these years was second in the principal tournament of the 1916-17 campaign before finishing fifth in the subsidiary tournament. Ashworth would manage the team throughout the war, up to the end of 1919, when he joined Liverpool.

An unsuccessful 1920–21 campaign saw Stockport finish bottom of the Second Division; however, instead of facing re-election, Stockport were placed in the new Third Division North. They won five of the first six matches in the next season, were unbeaten from 1 January 1922 to 28 March 1922, and won their first Football League title when they beat Darlington in front of 18,500 fans at Edgeley Park. Albert Williams (the then manager) was presented with the trophy seven days later before the final home game against Lincoln City. (Note: Lincoln were the final game opponents in each of Stockport's first three title winning seasons.)

Now back in the Second Division, Stockport advertised in the local newspaper for first-class players in all positions. The team struggled but survived automatic relegation by one point. The following season, saw Ernest Barlow elected as the club chairman, a position he would hold for 30 years. Stockport's goalkeeper Harry Hardy was called up to play for the England national team. He kept a clean sheet in a 4–0 win against Belgium, and is the only player to be capped at full level by England while a Stockport player. (Note: Hardy was also selected for England for their 1925 tour of Australia while at Stockport. However, as these matches were classified as 'test' matches they are not recognised on international records.) Hardy also became the first Stockport player to make 150 consecutive appearances. Stockport County finished 13th that season.

Stockport returned to the Third Division North after finishing bottom of the Second Division in 1925–26. The team finished sixth the next season but received a two-point deduction and a £100 fine (roughly equivalent to £6,300 as of 2020) for fielding an ineligible player after the registration documents for Joe Smith were not received by the Football League.

The team closed out the 1920s in the Third Division North. The 1927–28 season saw the club finish third. Joe Smith was Stockport's and the division's leading goalscorer, contributing 38 of Stockport's 89 goals, notably scoring five in a 6-3 home win against Southport. Stockport then twice finished second in consecutive seasons. In the 1928–29 season, they amassed 62 points, scored over 100 goals, averaged 10,000 fans for the first time, and won nine of their last eleven matches, but it was not enough to win the league. Stockport also finished second the following season, finishing four points behind the champions Port Vale, despite beating them 2–1 away on Christmas Day and 4–2 on Boxing Day, 1929. Frank Newton was Stockport's and the division's leading goalscorer, with 36 of Stockport's 106 goals, During this time Newton equalled the club record; set two seasons earlier, for goals scored in a match, with five against Nelson on 21 September 1929.

=== 1930–1950 ===
From the start of the 1930s, Stockport County played in a home kit of white and black and were nicknamed the 'Lilywhites'. In the 1933–34 season they scored 115 goals; a 13–0 home win over Halifax Town on 6 January 1934 included a Joe Hill hat-trick and four goals from Percy Downes. (Note: This victory still stands as a Football League record held jointly with Newcastle United who beat Newport County by the same score in 1946.) During the season, Alf Lythgoe scored a club-record 46 goals for Stockport, and Stockport's 2–1 home defeat on 9 December 1933 to Crystal Palace in the second round of the 1933–34 FA Cup was televised. Stockport finished third that season.

Shortly after midday on 23 July 1935; three weeks before the start of the 1935-36 season, the wooden main stand at Edgeley Park burned down, also causing damage to houses opposite. The fire also destroyed the club's records up to 1935. The current Main Stand was built in 1936 and officially opened by Charles Sutcliffe, then president of the Football League. In the 1936–37 season Stockport won the Third Division North, gaining 60 points and 23 wins; (Note: Teams were awarded two points for winning a match until the end of the 1980-81 season) the season included a ten-game unbeaten run including seven victories before a last-day title decider against Lincoln City attended by over 27,000 fans. The following season, however, they finished bottom of the Second Division and were relegated to the Third Division North after earning only 31 points.

During the 1939–40 season, Stockport played only two matches (losing both and being bottom of the league) before war was declared. The Football League was then suspended and did not resume until after World War II. Regional league competitions were set up; the FA Cup was also suspended and replaced with the Football League War Cup. In the first war league (1940–41), Stockport finished in 35th place overall in the Northern Regional League after playing 29 games. League standings were calculated by goal average over the course of games played, with some teams playing more than others. Harry Catterick made 122 guest appearances for Stockport in wartime competitions scoring 98 goals.

In the 1945–46 season, there was no English league football, regional competitions still took place, but the FA Cup competition was resumed. Stockport was eliminated from the 1945–46 FA Cup in the first round after a 3–2 aggregate loss to Rochdale. Also in 1945–46, Stockport hosted Doncaster Rovers in a League Three North Cup match, reputed to be the longest professional football match, lasting 203 minutes. The first meeting had finished 2–2, so a replay was needed, and with no extra time provisions, the game had to continue until somebody scored. However, apart from a disallowed goal (after 173 minutes of play), neither side scored, and the game was eventually ended because of bad light. Stockport then lost the second replay 4–0. In the first post-war league season, Stockport finished fourth in the Third Division North with 24 wins and 50 points.

=== 1950–1999 ===
The 1950s brought little league success, but were notable for goal-scoring by Jack Connor, whose 140 goals in five seasons are still a club record. These included 13 hat-tricks (three of which were consecutive—one against Crewe Alexandra and two against Chester), two instances of four goals in a match (against Workington and Carlisle United), and two of five goals in a match (against Bradford Park Avenue and Tranmere Rovers).

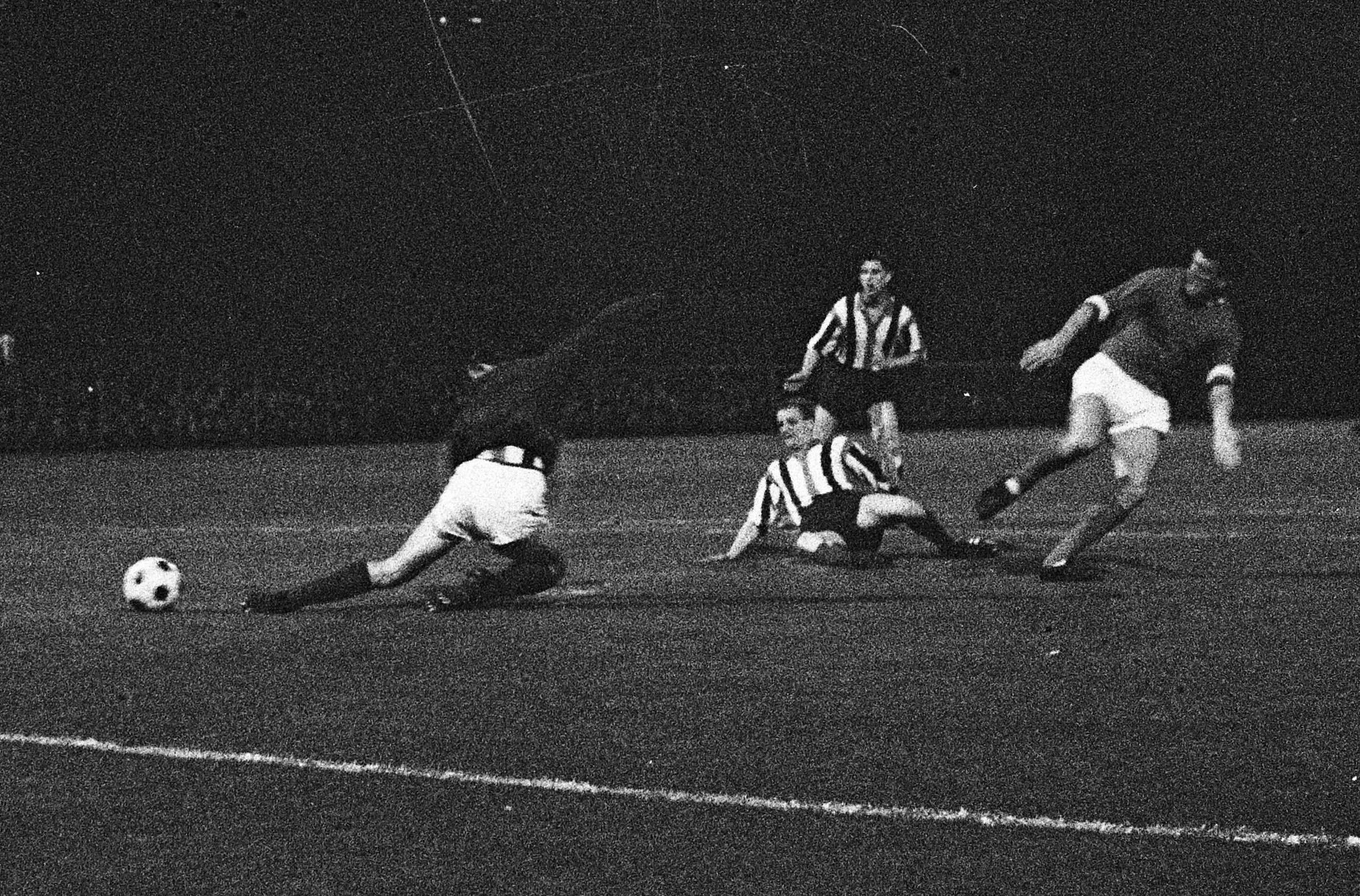
David Herd scoring a goal

In 1951 Alec Herd made an appearance alongside his son David in a 2–0 win against Hartlepool United on 5 May 1951, becoming the first father and son to play on the same pitch at the same time in a professional match. When the regional Third Divisions were to be combined into national Third and Fourth Divisions after the 1957–58 campaign, Stockport finished in the top half of the Third Division North and so were placed in the following season's national Third Division. Where they spent one season, before being relegated. Stockport participated in the first League Cup competition in 1960–61, beating Carlisle United in the first round, but the club was eliminated in the second round after a 3–0 defeat against Manchester City. They also enjoyed some success in the FA Cup defeating First Division team Luton Town 3–0, before being eliminated by a score of 3–2 in the fourth round away to West Ham United.

In the 1964–65 FA Cup, Stockport were drawn against reigning Football League champions Liverpool at Anfield. Stockport, then bottom of the Fourth Division, played to an unexpected 1–1 draw after taking the lead through Len White, but lost the replay 2–0. by the end of the 1964–65 season, the club had finished bottom of the Fourth Division with only 27 points but survived re-election by gaining 45 votes. Also during the 1964–65 season, Stockport chairman Vic Bernard re-introduced the royal blue strip, and hired former Manchester City goalkeeper and FA Cup winner, Bert Trautmann as the club's general manager to improve the club's image. Trautmann and Bernard decided to move matches to Friday evenings in an attempt to improve revenue. Trautmann's native German connections helped in arranging a friendly at the end of the 1964–65 season with FSV Frankfurt which Stockport lost 3–1. During the following pre-season, Stockport toured Germany where they played three friendlies in five days, against VfL Bochum, SC Opel Rüsselsheim and FSV Frankfurt. Trautmann resigned from his position in 1966. A friendly with SV Hamburg in May 1966 at Edgeley Park ended in a 5–1 defeat; Len White scored Stockport's only goal. Two seasons later Stockport returned to the Third Division by winning the Fourth Division in 1966–67 after gaining 64 points.

After the club was relegated at the end of they 1969–70 campaign, the 1970s and 1980s were times of mediocrity and struggles against relegation. In October 1972 Stockport eliminated West Ham United from the League Cup, helped by goalkeeper Alan Ogley, whose save was voted Stockport's 'Save of the century' in 2002. Stockport were eliminated in the next round against Norwich City. George Best made three appearances for Stockport in 1975, all home matches, scoring two goals. In February 1984, Stockport competed in the Associate Members' Cup; a competition that Stockport chairman, Yugoslavian hotelier Dragan Lukic helped create. The match, against Crewe Alexandra finished 2–2 after extra time and was decided in Stockport's first penalty shoot-out, which they lost 3–0. Eric Webster managed Stockport on five occasions, four of which were as caretaker manager during the 1980s, having first joined in 1974 to look after the youth set up. Webster signed Micky Quinn from Wigan Athletic and also received £2,000 from Wigan for the transfer. After 16 years service with the club, Webster was awarded a testimonial match against Manchester City in August 1990. Following the introduction of automatic promotion and relegation between the Football League and the Conference at the start of the 1986–87 season, Stockport faced the prospect of non-League football, with just six points from 13 games. However, Colin Murphy was brought in for his second spell as manager, and Stockport gained 45 points from their final 31 games to survive, although Murphy left shortly after the end of the season. (Note: From the 1981–82 season a three points for a win system was adopted)

Stockport play Oxford United at Edgeley park in 1994

Danny Bergara was appointed as manager in March 1989. Automatic promotion was gained in 1990–91. In the 1992 Football League Trophy Final, Bergara became the first South American to lead an English team at Wembley Bergara would lead Stockport to Wembley on three further occasions, once more in the Football League Trophy and twice in the play-offs, losing on all four occasions. The club were disciplined by the league and told to clean up their act after finishing the 1992–93 season with the worst disciplinary record in the country In 1994, they lost 2–1 in the Play-Off final to Burnley at Wembley, finishing the match with nine men after Michael Wallace was sent off for spitting at Ted McMinn. Chris Beaumont, who had scored one of Stockport's goals, was also dismissed. In March 1995 Bergara was sacked after an altercation with then-chairman Brendan Elwood, and Dave Jones was appointed manager in April.

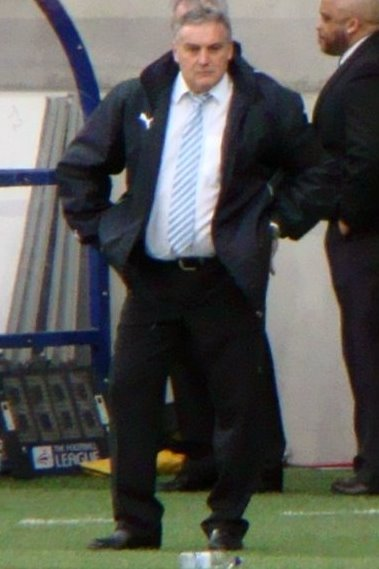
Dave Jones, pictured in 2010, managed Stockport in the 1990s

A new all-seater, Cheadle End, holding just over 5,000 at capacity, was opened at the start of the 1995–96 season. In an otherwise unremarkable season, the club reached the third round of the FA Cup, where they faced holders Everton at Goodison Park. Stockport drew the match 2–2 but lost the replay 3–2 ten days later.

The 1996–97 campaign proved to be the most successful in the club's history. They finished second in the Second Division and reached the semi-final of the League Cup, knocking out three Premiership teams on the way before losing to Middlesbrough 2–1 over two legs. Stockport lost the first leg 2–0 at Edgeley Park but won the second leg 1–0 with a goal from Sean Connelly. Before the start of the 1997–98 season, Dave Jones left for Southampton. Gary Megson left Blackpool to take over as manager. In his first season Stockport finished eighth, just two places off the playoffs—the club's best ever league placing.

However, the following season saw Stockport finish 16th, winning just three of their final fourteen matches. A 5–0 defeat at relegated Oxford United on the final day signalled the end of Megson's time at Edgeley Park. The club decided to promote from within. Andy Kilner, who was coaching in the club's Centre of Excellence at the time, was made first team manager. His tenure started with a 2–1 defeat of Manchester City at Maine Road, and on Boxing Day the club were sixth, holding a playoff spot.

=== 2000–2010 ===
After their win over Manchester City, the team went a club-record 19 games without a victory, eventually finishing the 1999–2000 season 17th, winning two of the final three matches to avoid relegation. The 2001–02 season was the club's worst ever at the time. With Stockport already bottom of the league, a 4–0 home defeat to Millwall saw manager Kilner sacked. Former England international Carlton Palmer was appointed in November 2001, but he failed to save Stockport from relegation to Division Two in 2001–02. Palmer was unable to build a team capable of challenging for a return Division One the next season.

The summer of 2003 saw an ownership change. Elwood sold the club to Sale Sharks owner Brian Kennedy in a move that would see Sale play their home games at Edgeley Park. A new company, Cheshire Sport, was created, combining ownership of Stockport County, Sale Sharks and the Edgeley Park stadium. After a poor start to the 2003–04 season, Palmer was sacked. John Hollins, director of football under Palmer, became caretaker manager, before former Northern Ireland manager Sammy McIlroy was appointed boss. Poor results led to his sacking and the appointment of Chris Turner one year later. Another relegation followed, Stockport now played in League Two, one level above the Conference Turner resigned after one year in charge following a 6–0 defeat to local rivals Macclesfield Town that left County five points adrift of safety and facing a third relegation in four years.

Chart of yearly table positions of Stockport County in the English football league system

In 2005, after reportedly losing £4 million in operating costs, Cheshire Sports chairman Brian Kennedy handed ownership of the club to the Stockport County Supporters Trust, which aimed to rescue the club from revenue loss, eventually break even and turn Stockport County into a community-based football club. Former player Jim Gannon was placed in charge, initially as caretaker manager. He led the club to safety in 2005–06, sustained a promotion challenge the next season, eventually missing out on the League Two playoffs on goal difference.

The following season, Stockport County continued their success, despite losing an FA Cup first round replay away to non-League Staines Town on penalties. At the end of the season, Stockport had an outside chance of automatic promotion, but missed out, finishing in fourth place. However, after beating Wycombe Wanderers 2–1 on aggregate in the play-off semi-final, Stockport played Rochdale at Wembley in the final, coming from behind to secure a 3–2 victory and earn promotion to League One for the next season.

During the 2008–09 season, Stockport were in the League One play off places at Christmas, but their form dipped during the final months with just two wins in their last ten games, which saw them slip to mid-table. Gannon was approached by Brighton & Hove Albion to become their manager, which was accepted by Stockport. Gannon rejected the job and stayed at Stockport. Due to Stockport's financial situation, Sale Sharks paid for Stockport's policing bill for their home match against Oldham Athletic.

Four days later, Stockport County was placed into administration due to a loan to a creditor of around £300,000 and a tax debt of £250,000 to Her Majesty's Revenue and Customs. On 12 June 2009, the club's administrator, Leonard Curtis, announced terms had been agreed with the Melrose Consortium—a group of businessmen with a sporting background headed by ex-Manchester City player Jim Melrose, for the sale of the club. Three months later, administrators agreed to a company voluntary arrangement (CVA) with previous shareholders and creditors. Gary Ablett, former Liverpool and Everton defender, was appointed Stockport manager following talks with the prospective new owners. In December 2009 the team's training ground was put up for sale. The following March, while a sale was agreed with the administrators, The Melrose Consortium never did take over the club after their bid was rejected by the Football League. A month later it was announced that a new consortium, the '2015 Group', had been given exclusivity to work towards a takeover of the club.

=== 2010–2011 ===
The purchase of Stockport County by the '2015 Group' of investors was approved by the Football League at its May 2010 meeting, with the takeover announced on 17 June 2010. Following the takeover, Ablett was dismissed after one of the poorest seasons in the club's history, with 25 points from 46 matches and being bottom of League One for the majority of the season. Starting the 2010-11 season in League Two, the new owners pledged to "rebuild the club from top to bottom", and appointed former Carlisle United boss Paul Simpson as manager. He was sacked after only six months in charge. However, with no proper succession plan in place, Peter Ward was appointed as interim manager, with former Wigan Athletic boss Ray Mathias brought in as assistant. This arrangement lasted for two months and in March 2011, Mathias was asked to replace Ward as interim manager. Despite an upturn in performances and results under Mathias, Stockport were relegated into the Conference for the first time in their history, after 106 years in the Football League.

== Non-league era (2011–2022) ==
Stockport County players warm up before a home match in 2011.

After relegation into the Conference National, Mathias was appointed as permanent manager. However, before the pre-season campaign got underway, he was dismissed when a Liverpool-based businessman tried—and ultimately failed—to buy the club, replacing Mathias with former German international Dietmar Hamann. Hamann had no prior managerial experience, won three of nineteen matches before resigning after his position had been undermined by a fans meeting after a home match in November 2011. This meeting called for Gannon, who had been attending Stockport's matches as a fan, to be re-appointed as manager; eight days later, Gannon was appointed as director of football. After overseeing an improvement in performances, Gannon steered Stockport away from the Football Conference relegation zone, finishing 16th.

The club regained sole tenancy of their Edgeley Park stadium for the first time in nine years from the beginning of the 2012–13 season, after Sale Sharks relocated to Salford City Reds' home ground. On 15 January 2013, former fcbusiness magazine editor, 30 year old Ryan McKnight was named as the new chief executive officer at the club, becoming the youngest in UK football. Gannon was subsequently sacked for a second time, and was replaced by Swiss Darije Kalezić, who had never managed in English football previously. He was dismissed after only two months following a rapid deterioration in results, which left the club facing relegation to the Conference North. Kalezić was succeeded by Ian Bogie, but he was unable to halt the slide, and they were relegated on the final day of the season.

The club announced it was to lose its full-time status, proceeding with a part-time model. The start to life in the Conference North was poor. Bogie resigned in late August 2013, with the club second from bottom of the league. Alan Lord, former assistant to both Jim Gannon and Peter Ward, was appointed manager in his place. McKnight announced his resignation in April 2014, stating he would leave in early May 2014. Lord managed a mid-table finish in the 2013–14 season, with a slightly improved position the following campaign Lord stepped down before the end of the 2014–15 season.

In February 2015, The Stockport County board of directors issued an open statement about the future aspirations of the football club, named the 'Moving Forward' Document. It focused on four key points—stability, sustainability, stadium and success.

The summer of 2015 saw Stockport starting their third season at National League North level. Neil Young was named as Stockport's new permanent manager after having previous successes in the same division with Chester. After failing to mount a serious promotion challenge, Young departed in January 2016. The club once again turned to Gannon, who returned for a third stint as manager after a successful period at Northwich Victoria.

Gannon guided the club to a ninth place finish at the end of the 2015–16 season, and a victory in the Cheshire Senior Cup. Gannon rebuilt his squad and finished the season around the playoff places over the course of the next two seasons. In 2017, a local search was carried out to locate descendants of the club's founders.

After coming close to promotion in the previous season, 2018–19 was an improved season. After a slow start, Stockport reached the second round of the FA Cup, where they lost 1-0 away against Barnet. Stockport also reached the FA Trophy semi-finals for the first time, losing 3–2 on aggregate to AFC Fylde. The first leg finished 0–0. The second leg finished 3–2 to Fylde. Stockport ended the season by winning their first league title in 52 years, and with it promotion back to the National League on the final day of the season. A parade was held a few weeks after the season ended. Also in 2018, Stockport paid tribute to 13 former players who lost their lives in the First World War; former player and Royal Air Force veteran George Haigh, then 103, unveiled a plaque displayed outside the ground.

Local businessman Mark Stott purchased County for an undisclosed sum in January 2020, making the club debt-free in the process; Stott pledged to return the club to full-time football, help to climb back up the Football League and find a new training ground for County. Managed by Dave Challinor (appointed in November 2021), County topped the National League in 2021–22, securing promotion back to the EFL after an 11-year absence.

== Return to the Football League ==
In their first season back in League Two, Stockport had a rocky start but went on a great run to finish 4th and reached the 2023 EFL League Two play-off final after a semi-final win over Salford City, losing to Carlisle United 5–4 on penalties after a 1–1 draw at Wembley. However, following a season that saw Stockport achieve their current club record of 12 consecutive wins, they finished the 2022-23 season as champions of League Two and returned to the third flight of English football for the first time in 13 years.
