= Stockport County Supporters' Co-operative =

- Formation: 2005
- Type: Supporters' co-operative
- Legal status: Registered Society
- Purpose: Football fans' advocacy
- Members: £12 a year
- Main organ: Board of directors
- Affiliations: Supporters Direct
- Website: countysupporterscoop.co.uk

Stockport County Supporters' Co-operative is a supporters' trust, recognised by Supporters Direct.

The supporters' trust owned a 98% stake of Stockport County Association Football Club Limited until 2009, when the club was placed into administration due to near bankruptcy. The club was eventually saved by The 2015 Group, which now owns a 100% stake in the club. The trust then changed its name to the Supporters' Co-operative.

== Formation ==
The formation of a supporters' trust with a view to take control of Stockport County began in early 2005 when then owner Brian Kennedy revealed he wished to sell the club. The Trust made a formal offer to take control of the club in early March 2005, and, after three months of negotiations and some last minute hindrances, the trust took control of Stockport County on 8 July 2005. The club started with few assets, Kennedy having repossessed Edgeley Park, previously County's main asset, for his Rugby Union club Sale Sharks.

The club had little assets and very little finances, and the trust signed a contract with Brian Kennedy to remain at Edgeley Park, which left the club with very little revenue streams. Therefore, a loan was taken out in July 2008 which eventually led to the club entering administration and the downfall of the trust.

== Aims ==
Finances aside, the trust's main aims revolved around ensuring its own future, and enhancing and expanding the relationship between the club and the community, with the specifics of these objectives being laid out in detail in the trust's registered rules.

- To encourage and promote the principle of supporters representation on the board of the club and ultimately to be the vehicle for democratic elections to the board of the club.
- To encourage the club to take proper account of the views and interests of its supporters and of the community which it serves, in its decisions.
- To help raise the profile of the club and encourage new support within the community.
- To obtain from the club a commitment to provide and maintain facilities for the enjoyment of professional football within the area.
- To strengthen the bonds between the club and the community which it serves and to represent the interests of the community in the running of the club.
- To support and encourage the further development of the club's school of excellence and its promotion of and involvement in football in the community.
- To benefit present and future members of the community served by the club by promoting, encouraging and furthering the game of football as a recreational facility, sporting activity and focus for community involvement.
- To be an inclusive democratic organisation that seeks to represent the views of all supporters of the club through open, affordable membership, and consultation and liaison with all supporters and supporters groups, regardless of whether they are members.

== Actions ==
After a disappointing start to their first season after purchasing the club, the Trust installed Jim Gannon as manager of the first team who, despite previously having had little managerial experience, had emerged as one of the most highly rated managers in the lower leagues.

Shortly before the start of the 2008-09 season, the trust revealed that the club's training facilities at Manor Farm were in dire need of repair before the end of the calendar year, or the landlords, previous County chairman Brendan Elwood and Trafford Borough Council, would exercise a break clause in the lease and evict the club. The Trust, having not budgeted for the additional expense, sent out a plea for fans and local businesses to donate time and money to help repair the facilities. The work done prior to the original deadline lead to a three-month extension.

The club was placed into administration in May 2009. The Trust now has no involvement in the running of the club.

The reformed Stockport County Supporters Co-operative has created the SCAN (Stockport County Appearance Number) Scheme, giving each debuting player a unique number which shows fans his place in the list of those who have made senior professional appearances for the club.

=== Edgeley Park ===
Stockport County have played at Edgeley Park since 1902, but since 2005 have been sharing the ground with Sale Sharks as tenants of Brian Kennedy. Kennedy retained ownership of the ground as the Trust took control of County in a deal where he agreed to also take on the club's debts. Losing control of the stadium was considered a huge blow by the club's fans and the Trust set the acquisition of the ground as one of its main responsibilities.

The Trust agreed a 10-year option to regain ownership of the ground by repaying £4,500,000 in debt taken on by Kennedy. Part of this deal required that 30% of any transfer fees or annual profit were paid toward this deficit, and while contributions through these clauses mean that the Trust now required only £3,600,000 more to reacquire the ground, it made it difficult to bring in funds for themselves.

In February 2008, the Trust secured a loan offer that would grant them the funds required to purchase back Edgeley Park if they could find a deposit of £1,000,000.

At the Trust AGM on 3 November 2008, a document was promised detailing the club's options for owning their own ground in the future.
