= 1904–05 in English football =

Football in England
- Season: 1904–05

Men's football
- First Division: Newcastle United
- Second Division: Liverpool
- Southern League: Bristol Rovers
- FA Cup: Aston Villa
- Charity Shield: Corinthian

The 1904–05 season was the 34th season of competitive football in England.

== Overview ==
Newcastle United could have won the First Division and FA Cup double, but lost in the FA Cup final 2-0 against Aston Villa.

== Events ==
Stockport County were replaced by Doncaster Rovers in the Second Division.

At the end of the 1904–05 season, the First Division was expanded to include 20 teams; Bury and Notts County were elected back into the First Division from the Second Division.

Manchester City, the previous season's FA Cup winners, were discovered to have been paying their players up to £6 or £7 per week instead of the legal maximum of £4 per week. The club's influential winger Billy Meredith was accused of bribing Aston Villa player Alex Leake and was faced with an 18-month ban from The Football Association, who further rebuked the club by dismissing five of its directors and banning a total of 17 players from ever playing for the club again.

== Honours ==
Competition	Winner
First Division	Newcastle United (1)
Second Division	Liverpool
FA Cup	Aston Villa (4)
Home Championship	England

Notes = Number in parentheses is the times that club has won that honour. * indicates new record for competition

== League tables ==
=== First Division ===
Pos	Team	Pld	W	D	L	GF	GA	GAv	Pts
1	Newcastle United (C)	34	23	2	9	72	33	2.182	48
2	Everton	34	21	5	8	63	36	1.750	47
3	Manchester City	34	20	6	8	66	37	1.784	46
4	Aston Villa	34	19	4	11	63	43	1.465	42
5	Sunderland	34	16	8	10	60	44	1.364	40
6	Sheffield United	34	19	2	13	64	56	1.143	40
7	Small Heath	34	17	5	12	54	38	1.421	39
8	Preston North End	34	13	10	11	42	37	1.135	36
9	The Wednesday	34	14	5	15	61	57	1.070	33
10	Woolwich Arsenal	34	12	9	13	36	40	0.900	33
11	Derby County	34	12	8	14	37	48	0.771	32
12	Stoke	34	13	4	17	40	58	0.690	30
13	Blackburn Rovers	34	11	5	18	40	51	0.784	27
14	Wolverhampton Wanderers	34	11	4	19	47	73	0.644	26
15	Middlesbrough	34	9	8	17	36	56	0.643	26
16	Nottingham Forest	34	9	7	18	40	61	0.656	25
17	Bury	34	10	4	20	47	67	0.701	24
18	Notts County	34	5	8	21	36	69	0.522	18

Source: World Football
Rules for classification: 1) Points; 2) Goal average; 3) Goals scored
(C) Champions

=== Second Division ===
Pos	Team	Pld	W	D	L	GF	GA	GAv	Pts	Promotion or relegation
1	Liverpool (C, P)	34	27	4	3	93	25	3.720	58	Promotion to the First Division
2	Bolton Wanderers (P)	34	27	2	5	87	32	2.719	56	Promotion to the First Division
3	Manchester United	34	24	5	5	81	30	2.700	53	
4	Bristol City	34	19	4	11	66	45	1.467	42	
5	Chesterfield Town	34	14	11	9	44	35	1.257	39	
6	Gainsborough Trinity	34	14	8	12	61	58	1.052	36	
7	Barnsley	34	14	5	15	38	56	0.679	33	
8	Bradford City	34	12	8	14	45	49	0.918	32	
9	Lincoln City	34	12	7	15	42	40	1.050	31	
10	West Bromwich Albion	34	13	4	17	56	48	1.167	30	
11	Burnley	34	12	6	16	43	52	0.827	30	
12	Glossop	34	10	10	14	37	46	0.804	30	
13	Grimsby Town	34	11	8	15	33	46	0.717	30	
14	Leicester Fosse	34	11	7	16	40	55	0.727	29	
15	Blackpool	34	9	10	15	36	48	0.750	28	
16	Burslem Port Vale	34	10	7	17	47	72	0.653	27	Re-elected
17	Burton United	34	8	4	22	30	84	0.357	20	Re-elected
18	Doncaster Rovers (R)	34	3	2	29	23	81	0.284	8	Failed re-election and demoted

(C) Champions; (P) Promoted; (R) Relegated
