= Andy Thorpe (footballer) =

English footballer

Personal information
- Full name: Andrew Thorpe
- Date of birth: 15 September 1960 (age 66)
- Place of birth: Stockport, England
- Position: Defender

Youth career
- Stockport County

Senior career*
Years	Team	Apps	(Gls)
1978–1986	Stockport County	380	(3)
1986–1988	Tranmere Rovers	53	(0)
1988–1992	Stockport County	175	(0)
1992–1993	Morwell Falcons	9	(0)
1994	Macclesfield Town	5	(0)
1995–1997	Chorley		
1997	Doncaster Rovers	2	(0)
1997–1998	Chorley		
1998–1999	Radcliffe Borough	53	(3)
- * Club domestic league appearances and goals

Andrew Thorpe (born 15 September 1960) is an English former footballer who played as a defender in the Football League for Stockport County, Tranmere Rovers and Doncaster Rovers. He holds the title of record appearance maker for Stockport County, with 489 league appearances, and 555 in all competitions.

Thorpe made his Stockport debut as a 17-year-old in 1978 and went on to make 380 appearances before leaving for Tranmere Rovers before the 1986–87 season. After 18 months he returned to County where he made a further 175 appearances. His last game for the club was against Peterborough United in the 1992 Football League Trophy final at Wembley, before being released at the end of the season.

In 1992, Thorp moved to Australia to play with the Morwell Falcons in their first ever season in the National Soccer League. He returned to England in 1994 and resumed his career with Macclesfield Town and then with for non-league club Chorley, before returning to the Football League at the age of 37 to play twice for Doncaster Rovers on a non-contract basis, after which he went back to Chorley then ended his career at Radcliffe Borough.

He is currently the physio at Rochdale.

== Honours ==
Stockport County

- Associate Members' Cup runner-up: 1991–92
