= Damien Allen =

English footballer

Personal information
- Full name: Damien Samuel Allen
- Date of birth: 1 August 1986 (age 40)
- Place of birth: Cheadle, England
- Position: Centre midfielder

Youth career
- 1997–2000: Manchester United
- 2000–2004: Stockport County

Senior career*
Years	Team	Apps	(Gls)
2004–2007	Stockport County	57	(1)
2007	→ Royal Antwerp (loan)	15	(1)
2007–2008	Morecambe	20	(0)
2008–2009	FC Halifax Town	30	(0)
2009–2010	Bury	0	(0)
2010–2011	Colwyn Bay	45	(12)
2011–2018	Bangor City	151	(11)
2018	Aberystwyth Town	8	(0)
2018–2019	Newtown	0	(0)
2018	→ Denbigh Town (loan)		
- * Club domestic league appearances and goals

Damien Samuel Allen (born 1 August 1986) is an English former footballer who is sporting director at Stockport County.

Damien progressed through the Centre of Excellence youth system at Stockport County after being released by Manchester United at the age of 14 and made his mark in centre midfield. He made his debut for Stockport in a 2–0 defeat at Wrexham in 2004–05.

After a spell on loan at Royal Antwerp, Allen joined Morecambe in August 2007. After a season at the club Allen was released by manager Sammy McIlroy.

He signed for non league FC Halifax Town on 7 October 2008.

Allen signed a 12-month contract with Bury on 29 July 2009 following a successful trial period with the club.

After not making any league appearances for Bury, he was released at the end of the season. On 28 July 2010, Allen signed for Welsh club Colwyn Bay managed by former Bury player Dave Challinor. On 28 November 2011, Allen signed for the then Welsh Premier League champions, Bangor City.

After 7 years at Bangor City, Allen signed for rivals Aberystwyth Town in January 2018.

During summer 2020 Allen was announced as the Academy Manager at his first club Stockport County.
