= Eric Webster =

English footballer and coach

Personal information
- Date of birth: 24 June 1931
- Place of birth: Manchester, England
- Date of death: 24 January 2016 (aged 84)
- Position: Wing half

Youth career
- Ardwick Lads Club
- 1950–1952: Manchester City

Senior career*
Years	Team	Apps	(Gls)
1952–1953	Manchester City	1	(0)
- Ashton United
- Hyde United
1958–1959	Macclesfield Town	12	(4)
- Nantlle Vale
- Pwllheli
- Stalybridge Celtic

Managerial career
- Stalybridge Celtic
- Hyde United
- Runcorn
- Ashton United
- 1982–1985: Stockport County
- * Club domestic league appearances and goals

Eric Webster (24 June 1931 – 24 January 2016) was an English association football player and coach.

== Career ==
=== Playing career ===
Born in Manchester, Webster began his career with Ardwick Lads Club, before signing for Manchester City, where he made one appearance in the Football League. After leaving Manchester City, Webster played with Ashton United, Hyde United, Macclesfield Town, Nantlle Vale, Pwllheli and Stalybridge Celtic.

=== Coaching career ===
After retiring as a player, Webster managed Stalybridge Celtic, Hyde United, Runcorn and Ashton United, before moving to Stockport County to become head groundsman and a coach, eventually becoming full manager between 1982 and 1985.

He died on 24 January 2016.
