= Green Lane (Stockport) =

Defunct football ground in Stockport, England

- Interactive map of Green Lane
- Location: Heaton Norris, Stockport, England
- Coordinates: 53.4147°N 2.1752°W
- Surface: Grass

Construction
- Opened: 1889

Tenant
- Stockport County

Green Lane was a football ground in the Heaton Norris suburb of Stockport, England. It was the home ground of Stockport County between 1889 and 1902, and was used during the club's first two seasons in the Football League.

== History ==
Stockport County, then known as Heaton Norris Rovers, moved to the ground in 1889 from their previous home at Wilkes Field. The ground was initially an open field, but by 1890 a fence had been erected around the site, and two stands built; a small covered stand on the western touchline and an open wooden stand behind the northern goal line. There was also an embankment behind the southern goal line. Players changed in a barn on Green Lane.

Stockport were elected to the Football League in 1900, and the first League match played at the ground on 8 September 1900. The game saw both County's record home defeat and their record League attendance at the ground, with 5,000 spectators watching them lose 5–0 to New Brighton Tower.

At the end of the 1901–02 season the club moved to Edgeley Park. Green Lane was retained for use by the club's reserve team, and one further first team game was played at the ground on 18 April 1903 when Edgeley Park was being used by the rugby club. The site was later used for housing.
