= Stockport County F.C. =

Association football club in Greater Manchester, England

Stockport County
- Full name: Stockport County Football Club
- Nickname: The Hatters
- Short name: County
- Founded: 1883; 143 years ago (as Heaton Norris Rovers)
- Ground: Edgeley Park
- Capacity: 10,852
- Owner: Mark Stott
- Chairman: Mark Stott
- Manager: Jimmy McNulty
- League: EFL League One
- 2025–26: EFL League One, 3rd of 24
- Website: stockportcounty.com
| Home colours | Away colours | Third colours |

Stockport County Football Club is a professional football club based in Edgeley, Stockport, England, which competes in EFL League One, the third tier of the English football league system.

Formed in 1883 as Heaton Norris Rovers, they were renamed Stockport County in 1890 after the County Borough of Stockport. The team have played in blue and white kits since 1914; their original colours were red and white. The club is nicknamed "The Hatters" after the town's former hat-making industry. Stockport have played at Edgeley Park since 1902.

Stockport first joined the Football League in 1900 but had to seek re-election in 1904. The club were not re-elected and spent one season outside the competition before they returned for the 1905–06 season. County then played in the Football League continuously for 106 years until 2011, mostly in the lower divisions. The team won their first league championship in 1922, the newly created Third Division North. Two league championships followed in 1937 (Third Division North) and 1967 (Fourth Division). The 1990s was the team's most successful period, when Stockport competed in the First Division for five seasons and reached the League Cup semi-finals in 1996–97. County also made four appearances at Wembley Stadium during this period, two in the Football League Trophy and two in the Football League play-offs, but lost on each occasion.

After financial difficulties in the early 2000s, the club fell back down the divisions, and were relegated out of the Football League at the end of the 2010–11 season, then dropped to the sixth tier in 2012–13. Stockport stabilised on and off the pitch in the following seasons, and won promotion to the fifth tier in 2018–19. In 2021–22, the club topped the National League, securing promotion back to the EFL after an 11-year absence. In their second season back in the Football League, they secured automatic promotion to League One as champions.

== History ==
=== Football League ===
Stockport County was formed in 1883 as Heaton Norris Rovers at McLaughlin's Cafe in Heaton Norris, by a group of pupils from Stockport Sunday School. (Note: The pupils were: Tom Richards aged 19, Jack Hewitt, 18, Samuel Riley, 14, William Riley (brother of Samuel), 16, Tom Machin, 16, Stan Hockenhull, 17, Ted Whittle, 15, William Ridgway, 15, Ted Simpson, 16, and Ben Kelly, 15.) After playing home matches in different parks in the Stockport area for several years, Rovers moved to Green Lane in 1889. This is recognised as their first official ground. The club changed its name to Stockport County in 1890, the year after Stockport became a county borough. The team played in the Lancashire League and local cup competitions until 1900, when they gained admission to the Football League Second Division.

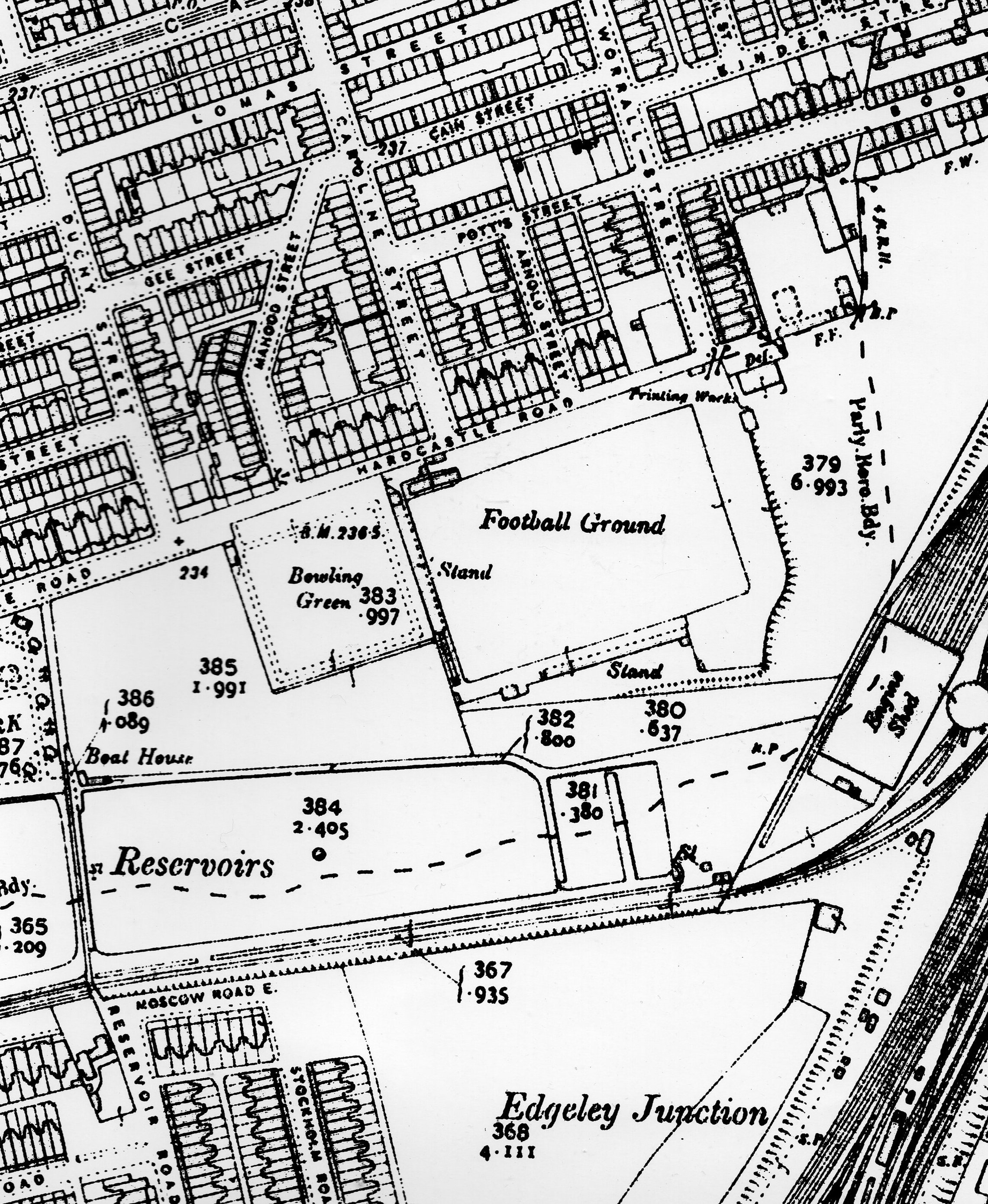
1910 Ordnance Survey map showing Edgeley Park and surrounding area

Stockport left Green Lane in 1902 and moved to Edgeley Park, which was also home to rugby league club Stockport RFC. County finished in the bottom three for their first four seasons, and failed to gain re-election at the end of the 1903–04 season. After spending one season in the Lancashire Combination, the club was readmitted to the Football League. In October 1908, it was confirmed that Stockport County would become a 'limited liability company'. The team remained in the Second Division for seven years until the 1912–13 season, when they again had to seek re-election. Stockport gained 22 votes and retained their Football League status.

David Ashworth was appointed as the team's first manager in 1914. After the outbreak of the First World War, competitive football was suspended. Stockport did, however, compete in the Lancashire section of the Wartime Football League, which was played from 1915–16 to 1918–19. Ashworth managed County throughout the war until the end of 1919, when he joined Liverpool.

The 1920–21 campaign saw Stockport finish bottom of the Second Division; however, instead of facing re-election, they were placed in the new Third Division North. The team won their first Football League title in 1921–22, when they defeated Darlington in front of 18,500 fans at Edgeley Park. The manager Albert Williams was presented with the trophy seven days later, before the final home game against Lincoln City. (Note: Lincoln were the final game opponents in each of Stockport's first three title winning seasons.) The club's goalkeeper Harry Hardy was called up for the England national team in 1924, and kept a clean sheet in a 4–0 win against Belgium. (Note: Hardy was also selected for England for their 1925 tour of Australia while at Stockport. However, as these matches were classified as 'test' matches they are not recognised on international records.) Stockport remained in the Third Division North during the 1920s, with two consecutive second-place finishes but failed to gain promotion.

In the early 1930s, Stockport County played in a black and white home kit, and were briefly nicknamed the 'Lilywhites'. On 23 July 1935, Edgeley Park's wooden main stand burned down, which caused damage to neighbouring houses. The fire also destroyed the club's records until 1935. A new main stand was built in 1936 and officially opened by Charles Sutcliffe, then president of the Football League. In 1936–37, the team won the Third Division North title and promotion to the Second Division following a last-day title decider against Lincoln City which was attended by more than 27,000 fans. They finished in bottom place the following season and were relegated back to the Third Division North, remaining there until the divisions were reorganised in 1958.

During the 1939–40 season, Stockport played only two matches before the Second World War started; the Football League was suspended and did not resume until 1946. Regional league competitions were set up; the FA Cup was also suspended and was replaced with the Football League War Cup. In March 1946, Stockport hosted Doncaster Rovers in a League Three North Cup match which lasted 203 minutes, and is considered the longest professional football game.

The regional Third Divisions were combined into the national Third and Fourth Divisions after the 1957–58 campaign. County were founder member of the new Third Division, but were relegated after one season. During the 1964–65 season, Stockport chairman Vic Bernard re-introduced the royal blue strip, and hired former Manchester City goalkeeper Bert Trautmann as the club's general manager to improve its image. Bernard and Trautmann decided to move matches to Friday evenings in an attempt to increase revenue. Trautmann resigned from his position in 1966. County returned to the Third Division by winning the Fourth Division in 1966–67.

The club was relegated back to the Fourth Division at the end of the 1969–70 campaign, and remained in the fourth tier until 1991. Eric Webster managed Stockport on five occasions, four of which were as caretaker manager during the 1980s, having first joined the club in 1974 as youth coach. Following the introduction of automatic promotion and relegation between the Football League and the Football Conference at the start of the 1986–87 season, Stockport faced the prospect of non-League football, with just six points from 13 games. However, Colin Murphy was brought in for his second spell as manager, and Stockport gained 45 points from their final 31 games to remain in the division, although Murphy left shortly after the season. (Note: From the 1981–82 season a three points for a win system was adopted)

Stockport play Oxford United at Edgeley Park in 1994.

Danny Bergara was appointed manager in March 1989, and gained automatic promotion to the Third Division in 1990–91. In the 1992 Associate Members' Cup Final, Bergara became the first South American to lead an English team at Wembley; Stoke City defeated County 1–0. He led Stockport to Wembley on three further occasions, once more in the 1993 Football League Trophy Final and twice in the play-offs, but lost all. In March 1995, Bergara was sacked after an altercation with then chairman Brendan Elwood, and was succeeded by Dave Jones. That same year saw the opening of the new all-seated Cheadle End stand, whose capacity was just over 5,000. The 1996–97 season proved to be the most successful in the club's history: Stockport finished second in the Second Division and reached the semi-finals of the League Cup, in which they eliminated three Premiership teams before losing 2–1 against Middlesbrough over two legs. Dave Jones left for Southampton in 1997 and Gary Megson took over as manager. County finished eighth in the First Division in his first season, only two places off the play-offs—the club's best ever league placing. With Stockport bottom of the First Division in October 2001, a home defeat against Millwall saw manager Andy Kilner sacked. Former England international Carlton Palmer was appointed in November 2001, but he failed to save the club from relegation to the third tier that season. Palmer was unable to build a team capable of returning to the First Division the next season. The summer of 2003 saw an ownership change. Elwood sold the club to Sale Sharks owner Brian Kennedy in a move that would see Sale play their home games at Edgeley Park. A new company, Cheshire Sport, was established, which combined ownership of Stockport County, Sale Sharks and the Edgeley Park stadium.

Chart of Stockport County's annual table positions in the English football league system from 1900 to the present

In 2005, after reportedly losing £4 million in operating costs, Kennedy handed ownership of the club to the Stockport County Supporters' Co-operative. Former County player Jim Gannon was appointed manager, initially as caretaker manager. He led the club to safety in 2005–06, and sustained a promotion challenge the next season but eventually missed out on the League Two play-offs on goal difference. The team continued their success during the 2007–08 season and reached the play-offs in which they faced Rochdale in the Final at Wembley. Stockport came from behind to win the game and earn promotion to League One.

In April 2009, Stockport County was placed into administration due to a loan to a creditor of around £300,000, and a tax debt of £250,000 to Her Majesty's Revenue and Customs. Two months later, County's administrator, Leonard Curtis, announced terms had been agreed with the Melrose Consortium—headed by ex-Manchester City player Jim Melrose—for the sale of the club. In July, administrators agreed to a company voluntary arrangement with the previous shareholders and creditors. The Melrose Consortium bid was rejected by the Football League, however, in March 2010. A new consortium, the 2015 Group, was given exclusivity to work towards a takeover of the club.

The purchase of Stockport County by the 2015 Group was approved by the Football League in May 2010, with the takeover announced in June. Before the start of the 2010–11 season, the new owners pledged to "rebuild the club from top to bottom", and appointed Paul Simpson as manager. He was sacked after only six months in charge, and Ray Mathias was brought in as interim manager. Despite an upturn in results, County were relegated to the Football Conference for the first time in their history.

=== Non-league era (2011–2022) ===
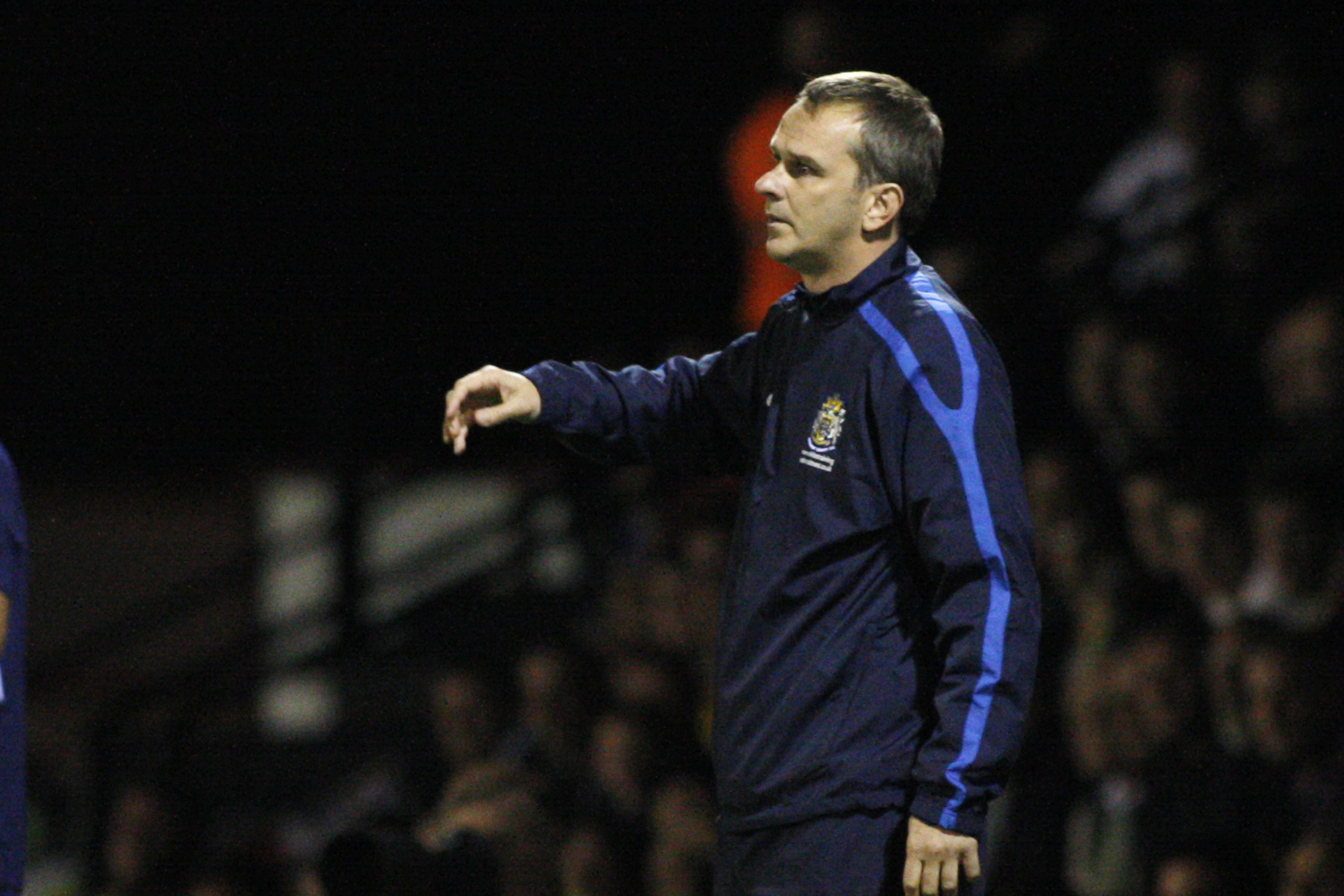
Dietmar Hamann on the touchline for Stockport County

After relegation, a Liverpool-based businessman tried, and ultimately failed, to buy the club. Dietmar Hamann, who had no prior managerial experience, was named manager in July 2011. He won only three of nineteen matches before resigning, after his position had been undermined by a fans' meeting in November. The fans called for Gannon to be re-appointed as manager. He was reinstated, steered Stockport away from the relegation zone and finished 16th.

The club regained sole tenancy of their Edgeley Park stadium for the first time in nine years in 2012, after Sale Sharks relocated to Salford City Reds' new ground. In January 2013, former fcbusiness magazine editor, 30-year-old Ryan McKnight was named as the chief executive officer at County. Gannon was subsequently dismissed for a second time. Stockport employed two further managers in three months, and were relegated to the Conference North on the final day of the 2012–13 season. The club announced it was to lose its full-time status, and proceeded with a part-time model. McKnight announced his resignation in April 2014.

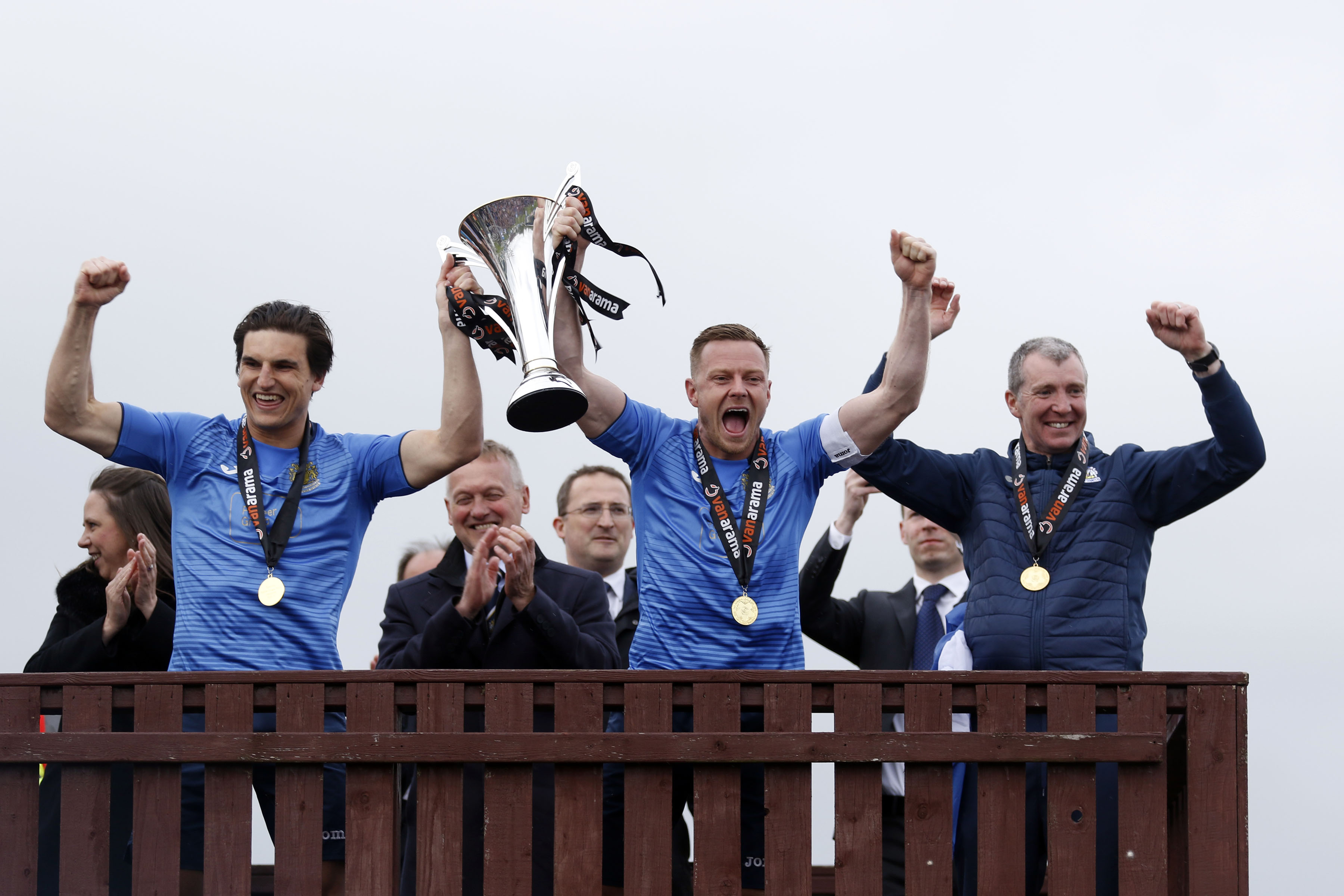
Stockport County lift the National League North title

Neil Young was named as Stockport's new manager in 2015, after he had previous successes in the division with Chester, but departed in January 2016. County once again turned to Gannon, who returned for a third stint. He stabilised the club on the pitch and finished around the play-offs places for the next two seasons. In 2017, a local search was carried out to locate descendants of the club's founders. In 2018–19, Stockport reached the semi-finals of the FA Trophy and won the Conference North, their first league title in 52 years.

Local businessman Mark Stott purchased County for an undisclosed fee in January 2020, and cleared its debts; Stott pledged to return the club to full-time football, to reach the Football League and to find a new training ground. Managed by Dave Challinor (appointed in November 2021), County topped the National League in 2021–22, securing promotion back to the EFL after an 11-year absence.

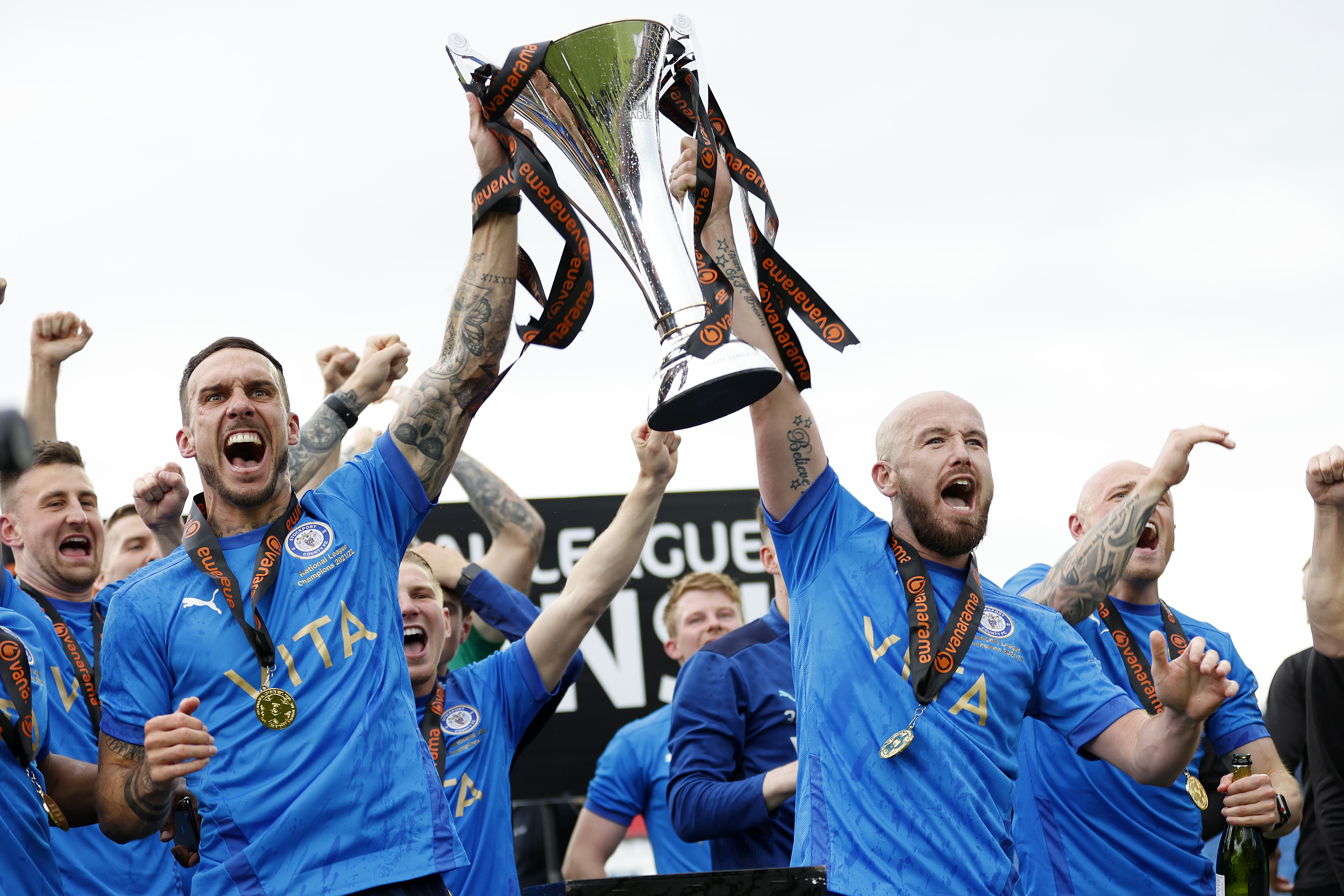
Stockport County lift the National League trophy

=== Return to the Football League ===
In their first season back in League Two, 2022–23, Stockport finished 4th and reached the play-off final, losing to Carlisle United 5–4 on penalties after a 1–1 draw at Wembley. The following season, 2023–24, Stockport secured automatic promotion to League One and were later crowned as champions with two games remaining. They reached the League One play-offs in the following season but lost on penalties in the semi-final to Leyton Orient.

In January 2026, Stott Capital, the investment firm owned by County owner and chairman Mark Stott, acquired a controlling stake in the Hungarian side Debreceni VSC. Stott said the two clubs will operate "entirely independently" and he remained "firmly committed" to County. They reached the 2026 EFL Trophy final, but lost 3–1 to Luton Town. Stockport returned to Wembley the following month for the League One play-off final but lost 4–1 to Bolton Wanderers. Manager Dave Challinor left the club by mutual consent the following week and was replaced by Jimmy McNulty.

== Recent seasons ==
| Season | Division | Tier | Pos | Pl | W | D | L | + | - | P | Note |
|---|---|---|---|---|---|---|---|---|---|---|---|
| 2016–17 | National League North | VI | 8 | 42 | 19 | 16 | 7 | 59 | 41 | 73 | |
| 2017–18 | National League North | VI | 5 | 42 | 20 | 9 | 13 | 75 | 57 | 69 | Eliminated in the National League North play-off quarterfinals to Chorley |
| 2018–19 | National League North | VI | ↑ 1 | 42 | 24 | 10 | 8 | 77 | 36 | 82 | Promoted to National League |
| 2019–20 | National League | V | 8 | 39 | 16 | 10 | 13 | 51 | 54 | 58 | |
| 2020–21 | National League | V | 3 | 42 | 21 | 4 | 7 | 69 | 32 | 77 | Eliminated in the National League play-off semifinals to Hartlepool United |
| 2021–22 | National League | V | ↑ 1 | 44 | 30 | 4 | 10 | 87 | 38 | 94 | Promoted to League Two |
| 2022–23 | League Two | IV | 4 | 46 | 22 | 13 | 11 | 65 | 37 | 79 | Lost the League Two play-off final to Carlisle United |
| 2023–24 | League Two | IV | ↑ 1 | 46 | 27 | 11 | 8 | 96 | 48 | 92 | Promoted to League One |
| 2024–25 | League One | III | 3 | 46 | 25 | 12 | 9 | 72 | 42 | 87 | Eliminated in the League One play-off semifinals to Leyton Orient |
| 2025–26 | League One | III | 3 | 46 | 22 | 11 | 13 | 71 | 58 | 77 | Lost the League One play-off final to Bolton Wanderers |

== Colours, crests and traditions ==
Stockport County's traditional kit colours are blue and white, although they have played in other colours throughout their history. Stockport's original colours were possibly red and white, although other sources suggest they wore blue and white during their early years. From the mid-1930s to the mid-1960s, County played in white jerseys and black shorts. No set pattern has been established for the use of blue and white as the team's main colours. They have played at various times in a white jersey with a blue band and blue shorts, and a blue jersey with white pin stripes and white shorts. The club experimented for a short time with an Argentina-style kit, light blue and white stripes with black shorts, after the 1978 World Cup. This was abandoned after the outbreak of the Falklands War, and it returned to blue and white striped tops with blue shorts in the early 1980s. Stockport marked their 125th anniversary during 2008 by bringing in a third kit—a gold colour with black trim. It retired 'undefeated' at the end of the year, having been worn for 13 victories and four draws.

The club former crest, which was used from 1991 until 2010 when the club exited administration, was based on the arms of the Metropolitan Borough of Stockport. It was altered in 2006 to resemble the town's arms more closely, including the Latin motto Animo et Fide, which loosely translated means "With Courage and Faith". The blue shield is taken from the coat of arms of the de Stokeport family, from whom Stockport derives its name. The twin-towered castle above the shield is Stockport Castle, which stood until 1775.

After takeover of the club by the 2015 Group in 2010, a new crest was adopted. It was still based on the Stockport coat of arms, though the Latin motto was removed, along with a patch of green at the base of the badge; the flag of Cheshire, featuring a sword and three wheatsheaves, replaced the golden lozenges and crosslets in the shield. The medals hanging from the lion's rampant (which represented Cheshire and Lancashire, owing to Stockport's location astride the River Mersey which forms the historic border between the two counties) were removed. It also saw the return of a football on the shield. This change was made in part because as of the 2010–11 season, Stockport County was sponsored by the town's Metropolitan Borough Council. The crest was further altered in 2011 to re-include the town's motto. The new version added two white ribbons—one at the top, with Animo et Fide, and one at the bottom with Stockport County F.C.. In addition, the football was again removed from the shield. Stockport County Supporters' Co-operative used the blue on white cross from the 1978 badge as the main identifier in their company logo.

The club's kit was manufactured by local company Umbro, who supplied all three kits for the 2013–14 season. Stockport was Umbro's flagship partner for their relaunch in the UK. From the start of the 2014–15 season, Stockport again changed their kit manufacturer, from Umbro to Spanish-based company Joma.

| Period | Kit manufacturer | Shirt sponsor |
|---|---|---|
| 1976–1978 | Bukta | none |
| 1978–1979 | Admiral | none |
| 1979–1984 | Adidas | none |
| 1984–1985 | Bukta | none |
| 1985–1986 | Bukta | Langdale Services |
| 1986–1987 | Umbro | none |
| 1987–1989 | En-S | Messenger Newspapers |
| 1989–1991 | Ribero | Sovereign Rubber |
| 1990–1991 | Ribero | Gordon Ford Group |
| 1991–1993 | Gola | Cobra |
| 1993–1995 | Super League | Robinsons Best Bitter |
| 1995–1996 | Beaver | Robinsons Best Bitter |
| 1996–1999 | Adidas | Robinsons Best Bitter |
| 1999–2002 | Patrick | Robinsons Best Bitter |
| 2002–2007 | TFG Sports | Scandia |
| 2007–2009 | Diadora | Just Search |
| 2009–2010 | Macron | Just Search |
| 2010–2011 | Nike | Stockport Metropolitan Borough Council |
| 2011–2012 | Nike | GT Law |
| 2012–2013 | Nike | GT Law (Home and Away); Leemic (Third) |
| 2013–2014 | Umbro | Stockport Sports Village (Home); Match Day Cards (Away); Leemic (Third) |
| 2014–2015 | Joma | RESB Ltd. (Home); Playerboots.com (Away); Robinsons Dizzy Blonde (Alternative) |
| 2015–2016 | Joma | Playerboots.com (Home); TCM Advisors Limited (Away); Robinsons Dizzy Blonde (Alternative) |
| 2016–2017 | Joma | Euro Sport and Event Management (Home); TCM Advisors Limited (Away); Robinsons Unicorn (Away) |
| 2017–2018 | Joma | Euro Sport and Event Management (Home); Pioneer Group (Away); Robinsons Brewery(Away) |
| 2018–2019 | Joma | Pioneer Group (Home); Project Solar (Away); Robinson's Brewery & Help for Heroes (Away) |
| 2019–2020 | Joma | Pioneer Group (Home); Cheshire Anilox Technology (Away); Project Solar (Away) |
| 2020–2021 | Puma | Pioneer Group (Home); VITA (Away/Alternate) |
| 2021–2024 | Puma | VITA |

In 2024 the club also announced Stockport marketing agency GroFu as their shirt sleeve sponsor. It was announced on 3 July 2025 that this partnership had renewed been renewed on a two-year basis, extending until 2027.

== Grounds ==
=== Green Lane ===
Heaton Norris Rovers originally played home matches at the Heaton Norris Recreation Ground, then at various locations in Stockport until settling at a park on Green Lane, Heaton Norris, in 1889. The nearby Nursery Inn served as the team's home, with players using a barn as changing rooms. The club played at Green Lane for its first two seasons in the Football League.

The stadium had one main stand that ran the length of the pitch, and a raised bank behind one of the goals. The remainder of the ground was uncovered terracing, with turnstiles located at the back of the Nursery Inn.

=== Edgeley Park ===
By 1902, County required a larger ground and moved to Edgeley Park, then home of the rugby league club Stockport RFC. Green Lane was retained for use by the club's reserve team, although one further first team game was played at the ground in April 1903, when Edgeley Park was used by the rugby club. The Green Lane site was later used for housing.

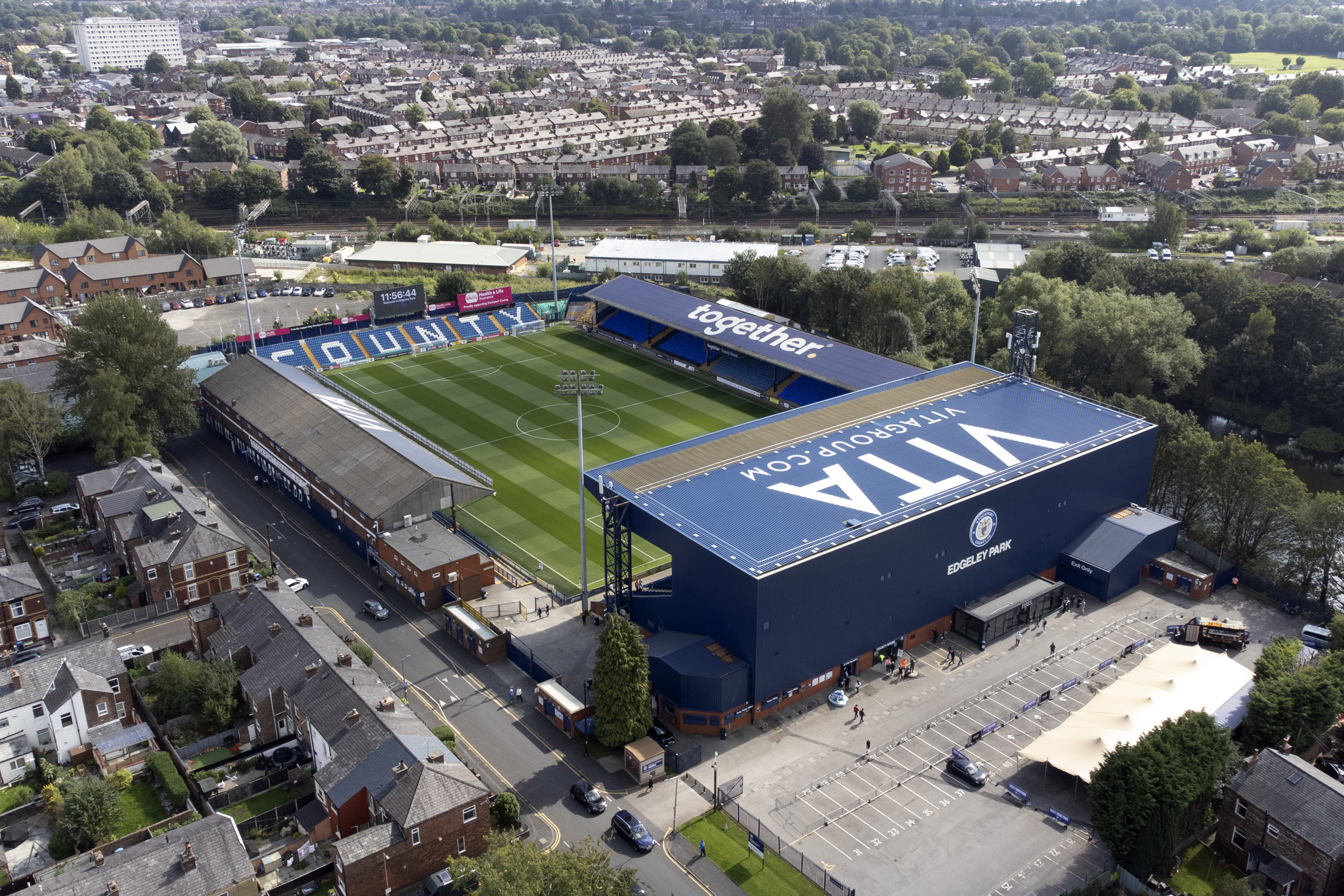
Aerial pic of Edgeley Park, home of Stockport County

In 1995, a new 5,000 all-seated Cheadle End stand was built to replace the terrace. In late 2000, chairman Brendan Elwood considered moving Stockport to Maine Road, the home of rivals Manchester City. The potential move was unpopular with supporters, and protests were staged after it was suggested that the club would change its name to Man-Stock County. The Manchester City Council ultimately decreed that rugby union club Sale Sharks would make better tenants. Maine Road was demolished in 2004 to make way for a housing estate, and Edgeley Park was then shared with Sale whose parent company, Cheshire Sports, owned the ground. In 2001, The Railway End, opposite the Cheadle End, was the last part of Edgeley Park to be converted to seating, and took the stadium's total capacity to 10,852.

There was another rumour that Stockport would leave its home ground in 2012. This was dismissed by chairman Peter Snape, before Sale Sharks confirmed that they would be moving to Salford City Reds' new stadium. It left Stockport County as the only tenants at Edgeley Park. In May 2012, County renamed the Main Stand "The Danny Bergara Stand" in honour of the club's former manager.

Stockport Metropolitan Borough Council purchased the stadium in 2015, to prevent it from being demolished and redeveloped. After a plea from fans to safeguard the ground, an emergency council meeting was held, and the stadium was purchased for £2 million. It is currently leased back to the club. In February 2022, the club agreed a 250-year lease of Edgeley Park from Stockport council.

== Supporters and rivalries ==
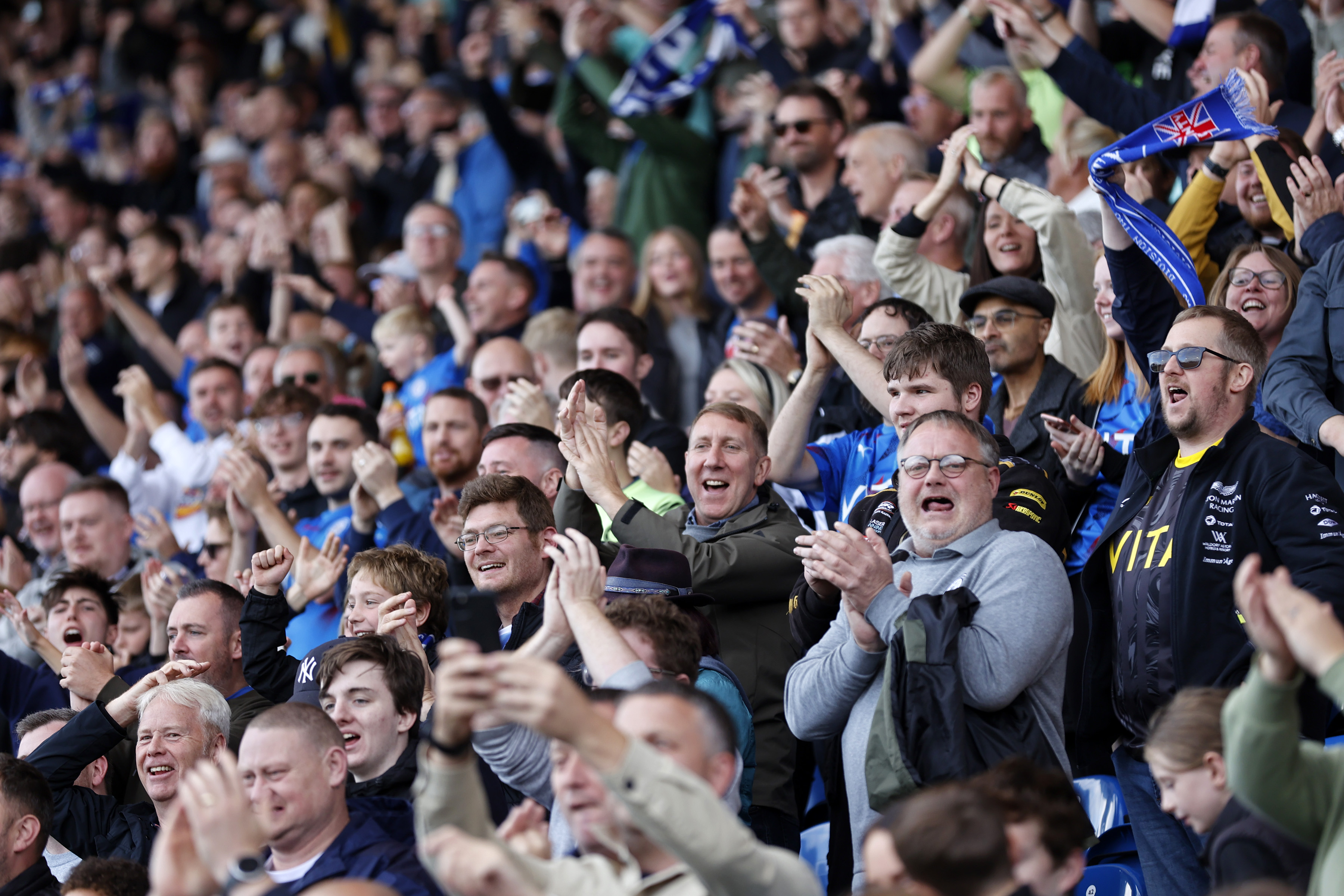
Stockport County supporters in the Cheadle End

With both Manchester United and Manchester City F.C. located around 7 miles (11 km) from Edgeley Park, Stockport County has always vied with top-level clubs for local support. During the mid-1960s, the Football League introduced a minimum admission price for all clubs in the four professional tiers, attempting to boost revenue for smaller clubs. It had the opposite effect in places like Stockport, where many other league clubs were in relatively close proximity. As a result, County moved all their home games to Friday evening, which generated larger crowds and extra business in surrounding pubs and restaurants.

In 2004, the club attracted a crowd of more than 20,000 for one of its tour matches in China. Stockport were watched by 22,000 in Yingkou against their then sister side Stockport Tiger Star. It is possible this attendance was a result of County's association with their affiliate team, and Tiger Stars' name change to include 'Stockport' two years before.

The 2006–07 season saw the club average the fourth highest average attendance in League Two. There was a further increase the following season with Stockport's away support outnumbering home supporters on a number of occasions. Stockport County had an average away attendance of over 900, the highest in the division. The club set a National League North record attendance, when 4,797 people attended a home fixture with F.C. United in December 2015. This attendance was broken again three times in the following three seasons. (Note: The attendances for these matches were: 5,783 vs Gloucester City in 2016–17, 6,230 vs Chorley in 2017–18, and 6,311 vs Spennymoor Town in 2018–19.)

The support from County fans has often been cited by managers and players, with the fans influence likened to having a twelfth player on the field. Between the 2006–07 and 2009–10 seasons, the squad number 12 was allocated to the 'Blue & White Army', in reference to the fans being the team's 12th man. However, for the 2010–11 season, the number reverted to one of the players. It was given back to the fans upon the club's return to the National League in 2019.

Some famous Stockport County fans include darts players Tony O'Shea and Nathan Aspinall, singer-songwriter Daz Sampson, Blossoms' bassist Charlie Salt, and Southampton and England under 21 defender, Taylor Harwood-Bellis. O'Shea has written articles in the club's matchday programme and has also worn County's colours in all of his televised darts matches. Sampson became a lifelong member of the Stockport County Supporters' Trust after he released "The County Song", which paid tribute to the team's Football League record of nine consecutive wins without conceding a goal.

=== Supporters' groups ===
'Help the Hatters' is a group of volunteers who raise money for the club and help with the maintenance of Edgeley Park. They also organised the 'Players Fund', which paid the wages of young players, and gave the Stockport County Supporters' Co-operative shares in the club. The group transformed the club's Legends Lounge into the Stockport County Museum, which was opened by former player George Haigh on his 102nd birthday.

Stockport County Supporters' Co-operative is the other active supporters' group. It runs the Stockport County Appearance Number Scheme (SCAN), where every player who has played a first-team game is recognised with a framed certificate and a number which shows their position on the list of players who made their debut for the club.

=== Rivalries ===
As the two nearby Manchester clubs have rarely been in the same division as Stockport, historically there has been little rivalry with either club until the 1990s, when the rivalry between County and Manchester City took form between 1997 and 2002. The two clubs spent three out of five seasons in the same division and during the 1998–99 season, Stockport were a division above City.

The club also has significant local rivalries with Oldham Athletic, Rochdale, Bury, Crewe Alexandra, and Macclesfield. According to a survey in 2003, County supporters include more distant clubs Burnley and Stoke City among their main rivals for more historical reasons.

== Players ==
=== Current squad ===
As of 28 August 2026

Note: Flags indicate national team as defined under FIFA eligibility rules; some limited exceptions apply. Players may hold more than one non-FIFA nationality.

| No. | Pos. | Nation | Player |
|---|---|---|---|
| 1 | GK | ENG | Oliver Whatmuff (on loan from Manchester City) |
| 2 | DF | ENG | Josh Dacres-Cogley |
| 4 | MF | ENG | Lewis Bate |
| 5 | DF | ENG | Ethan Pye (vice-captain) |
| 6 | DF | IRL | Eoghan O'Connell |
| 7 | FW | ENG | Jack Diamond |
| 8 | MF | NIR | Callum Camps |
| 9 | FW | ISL | Benoný Breki Andrésson |
| 10 | MF | NIR | Oliver Norwood (captain) |
| 12 | DF | ENG | Tom Wilson-Brown |
| 14 | DF | ENG | Tayo Edun |
| 15 | MF | ENG | Ryan Glover |
| 16 | MF | ENG | Harry Wood |
| 17 | MF | ENG | Ryan Rydel |
| 18 | MF | SCO | Lewis Fiorini |
| 19 | FW | ENG | Kyle Wootton (vice-captain) |
| 20 | MF | ENG | Jason Adigun |

| No. | Pos. | Nation | Player |
|---|---|---|---|
| 22 | FW | FRA | Mikael Mandron |
| 23 | MF | ENG | Ben Osborn |
| 24 | DF | ENG | Kyron Gordon |
| 25 | DF | ENG | Mamadou Jobe |
| 26 | GK | ENG | Luca Ashby-Hammond |
| 28 | FW | JAM | Che Gardner |
| 29 | FW | GAM | Adama Sidibeh |
| 30 | MF | ENG | Ethan Ennis |
| 31 | DF | ENG | Jay Mingi |
| 32 | GK | IRL | Andrew Wogan |
| 33 | DF | ENG | Brad Hills |
| 41 | FW | ENG | Bruno Cina |
| 42 | MF | ENG | James Bailey |
| 51 | GK | ENG | Cian O'Shea |
| 55 | FW | ENG | Joe Astles |
| 63 | DF | ENG | Dan Marshall |
| 76 | MF | ENG | Richard Ilara |

=== Out on loan ===
Note: Flags indicate national team as defined under FIFA eligibility rules; some limited exceptions apply. Players may hold more than one non-FIFA nationality.

| No. | Pos. | Nation | Player |
|---|---|---|---|
| 3 | DF | ENG | Owen Dodgson (at Mansfield Town until 30 June 2027) |
| 11 | FW | JAM | Malik Mothersille (at Wycombe Wanderers until 30 June 2027) |

| No. | Pos. | Nation | Player |
|---|---|---|---|
| 21 | MF | ENG | Owen Moxon (at Cambridge United until 30 June 2027) |
| — | GK | JAM | Corey Addai (at Burton Albion until 30 June 2027) |

=== Hall of Fame ===
This list contains the names of all past players/club staff who have been inducted into the Stockport County Hall of Fame.

- (England) Andy Thorpe
- (Scotland) Bobby Murray
- (England) Mike Flynn
- (England) John Rutter
- (Republic of Ireland) Jim Gannon
- (England) Jack Connor
- (England) Alf Lythgoe
- (Saint Kitts and Nevis) Kevin Francis
- (England) Sean Connelly
- (England) Brett Angell
- (England) Brendan Elwood
- (England) Trevor Porteous
- (England) Alan Ogley
- (England) Jim Fryatt
- (England) Bill Atkins
- (England) Bill Williams
- (Scotland) James Stevenson
- (England) Billy Bocking
- (England) Joe Butler
- (England) Johnny Price
- (Uruguay) Danny Bergara
- (England) Harry Hardy
- (England) Dave Jones
- (England) Micky Quinn
- (England) Tommy Sword
- (England) Len White
- (England) Rodger Wylde
- (England) Lee Todd
- (England) Eric Webster

=== Internationals ===
Fifteen players have earned full international caps while registered with Stockport County. Harry Hardy was the first Stockport player to win an international cap, in 1924, and remains the only Stockport-registered player to have played for England.

| Player | | Country | Caps | Goals | Years of caps | Notes |
| Jarkko Wiss | (Finland) | Finland | 9 | 1 | 2000–2002 | |
| Ibou Touray | (The Gambia) | The Gambia | 8 | 0 | 2023-2024 | |
| Shefki Kuqi | (Finland) | Finland | 7 | 1 | 2001 | |
| Petri Helin | (Finland) | Finland | 7 | 0 | 2001–2002 | |
| Martin Nash | (Canada) | Canada | 6 | 0 | 1997 | |
| Nick Colgan | (Republic of Ireland) | Ireland | 4 | 0 | 2003–2004 | |
| Myles Hippolyte | (Grenada) | Grenada | 2 | 1 | 2023 | |
| Harry Hardy | (England) | England | 1 | 0 | 1924 | |
| Paul Jones | (Wales) | Wales | 1 | 0 | 1997 | |
| Jim Goodwin | (Republic of Ireland) | Ireland | 1 | 0 | 2002 | |
| Danny Griffin | (Northern Ireland) | Northern Ireland | 1 | 0 | 2004 | |
| Ashley Williams | (Wales) | Wales | 1 | 0 | 2008 | |
| Peter Thompson | (Northern Ireland) | Northern Ireland | 1 | 0 | 2008 | |
| Lois Maynard | (Saint Kitts and Nevis) | Saint Kitts and Nevis | 1 | 0 | 2021 | |
| Benoný Breki Andrésson | (Iceland) | Iceland | 1 | 0 | 2026 | |
| Adama Sidibeh | (The Gambia) | The Gambia | 1 | 0 | 2026 | |

== Board and technical staff ==
=== Club personnel ===
| Position | Name |
|---|---|
| Club Owner | Mark Stott |
| Non-Executive Chairman | Ken Knott |
| Chief Executive Officer | Vacant |
| Chief Operating Officer | Gavin Bailey |
| Directors | Mark Stott; Jonathan Vaughan; Ken Knott |
| Club President | Steve Bellis |
| Brand and Communications Director | David Ancell |
| Life Presidents | Angela White; Robert Smith Bewley; Arthur Collister; Steve Cree; Richard Hill; Mike Flynn; George Hudson; John Rutter |
| Head of Football Administration | Alex Cowdy |

=== Coaching staff ===
| Position | Staff |
|---|---|
| Sporting Director | (England) Damien Allen |
| Head Coach | (Scotland) Jimmy McNulty |
| Assistant Head Coach | (England) Jason Taylor |
| First Team Coach | (England) Matty Done |
| Head of Goalkeeping | (England) Ben Hinchliffe |
| Tactical Coach Analyst | (England) John Shannon |
| Sports Therapist | (England) Luke Smith |
| Head of Performance | (England) Sam Holt |
| Player Liaison Officer | (England) Matt Jansen |
| Kit Manager | (England) Richard Landon |
| Club Doctor | (England) Amjad Choudry |
| Head of Recruitment | (England) Jonathan Smith |

=== Media staff ===
| Position | Staff |
|---|---|
| Media and communications manager | (England) Liam Richardson |
| Club photographer | (England) Mike Petch |
| Digital content producer | (Republic of Ireland) Carl Gozem |

=== Top 10 managers in the club's history ===
Based on win percentage in all competitions

| Name | Nat | From | To | Record | | | | |
| Name | Nat | From | To | P | W | D | L | % |
|---|---|---|---|---|---|---|---|---|
| Lincoln Hyde | (England) | 1926 | 1931 | 221 | 128 | 35 | 58 | 57.92 |
| Dave Challinor | (England) | 2021 | 2026 | 203 | 112 | 45 | 46 | 55.17 |
| Andrew Wilson | (Scotland) | 1932 | 1933 | 43 | 21 | 12 | 10 | 48.84 |
| Simon Rusk | (Scotland) | 2021 | 2021 | 41 | 20 | 12 | 9 | 48.78 |
| Dave Jones | (England) | 1995 | 1997 | 117 | 57 | 32 | 28 | 48.72 |
| Fred Westgarth | (England) | 1934 | 1936 | 95 | 46 | 16 | 33 | 48.42 |
| Andy Beattie | (Scotland) | 1949 | 1952 | 150 | 71 | 28 | 51 | 47.33 |
| Bob Kelly | (England) | 1936 | 1938 | 52 | 24 | 16 | 12 | 46.15 |
| Jim Gannon (three spells in charge) | (Republic of Ireland) | 2006 | 2021 | 507 | 233 | 120 | 154 | 45.96 |
| Danny Bergara | (Uruguay) | 1989 | 1995 | 319 | 137 | 83 | 99 | 42.95 |

^{Current manager in bold. Statistics only include full-time managers (interim or caretaker managers are excluded). Stats correct as of 19 April 2025.}

== Honours ==
League

- Third Division North / Second Division (level 3)
  - Champions: 1921–22, 1936–37
  - Runners-up: 1928–29, 1929–30, 1996–97
- Fourth Division / League Two (level 4)
  - Champions: 1966–67, 2023–24
  - Runners-up: 1990–91
  - Play-off winners: 2008
- National League (level 5)
  - Champions: 2021–22
- National League North (level 6)
  - Champions: 2018–19
- Lancashire League
  - Champions: 1899–1900
- Lancashire Combination
  - Champions: 1904–05

Cup

- Associate Members' Cup / Football League/EFL Trophy
  - Runners-up: 1991–92, 1992–93, 2025–26
- Third Division North Challenge Cup
  - Winners: 1934–35
- Manchester Senior Cup
  - Winners: 1897–98, 1898–99, 1914–15, 1922–23
- Cheshire Premier Cup
  - Winners: 1969–70, 1970–71, 2010–11
- Cheshire Senior Cup
  - Winners: 1905–06, 1946–47, 1948–49, 1965–66, 2015–16, 2021–22
- Cheshire Medal
  - Winners: 1922–23, 1924–25, 1928–29, 1929–30, 1930–31
- Cheshire Bowl
  - Winners: 1933–34, 1948–49, 1952–53, 1955–56, 1956–57,1958–59, 1960–61, 1962–63
- Cheshire Friendly Trophy
  - Winners: 1965–66, 1966–67

== Club records and statistics ==
=== Team records ===
- Highest league finish: 8th, 1997–98 Football League First Division (2nd tier)
- Lowest league finish: 14th, 2013–14 Football Conference North (6th tier)
- Biggest home league win: 13–0 versus Halifax Town, 6 January 1934, also a Football League record
- Biggest away league win: 7–1 versus Bradford City, 18 September 1965
- Biggest home league defeat: 0–6, most recently versus Huddersfield Town 24 April 2010
- Biggest away league defeat: 0–9, versus Everton Reserves, 9 December 1893
- FA Cup best run: 5th round 1934–35, 1949–50, 2000–01
- Biggest home FA Cup win: 7–0 versus Wrexham, 4 December 1893
- League Cup best performance: Semi-final 1996–97
- Associate Members' Cup / EFL Trophy best performance: Final 1991–92, 1992–93, 2025–26
- FA Trophy best run: Semi-finals 2018–19, 2021–22
- Consecutive wins: 12, 2023–24 (Note: Excluded from this number are two wins in cup competitions (one in the EFL trophy and one in the FA Cup).)
- Consecutive away wins: 9, 2021–22
- Consecutive wins without conceding a goal: 9, 2006–07, also a Football League record
- Consecutive defeats: 12, 2009–10
- Consecutive games scored in: 30, 2007–08
- Consecutive League games scored in: 26, 2007–08
- Highest attendance: 27,833 versus Liverpool, FA Cup fifth round, 11 February 1950
- Highest league attendance: 27,304 versus Lincoln City, Third Division North, 1 May 1937
- Highest attendance (all-seated): 10,592 versus Leyton Orient, League One play-off semi-final, 14 May 2025
- Lowest attendance: 812 versus Barrow, FA Trophy, 19 November 2013
- Longest match: Three hours and 23 minutes versus Doncaster Rovers, League Three North Cup, 30 March 1946
- Lowest number of paying spectators: 13 versus Leicester City (at Old Trafford), Second Division, 7 May 1921, also a Football League record (Note: It is estimated that between 1,000 and 2,000 people attended the match; Manchester United and Derby County had played immediately beforehand, and some spectators for that match had stayed on to watch the Stockport match for free. However, only 13 people paid at the gate to watch the Stockport match alone.)

=== Player records ===
- Most goals (season): 46, Alf Lythgoe, 1933–34
- Most goals (career): 132, Jack Connor (1951–1956)
- Most appearances (career): 555, Andy Thorpe (1978–1986, 1988–1992)
- Most international appearances (caps): 9, Jarkko Wiss, Finland (2000–2002)
- Youngest player: Paul Turnbull, aged 16 years and 97 days versus Wrexham, League One, 30 April 2005
- Oldest player: Alec Herd, aged 40 years and 47 days versus Crewe Alexandra, 25 December 1951
- Youngest goalscorer: Joe Astles, aged 16 years and 105 days versus Wolverhampton Wanderers, EFL Trophy, 2 September 2025
- Most consecutive clean sheets: 9, Wayne Hennessey, 2006–07

=== Nine-game winning run ===
Stockport County won nine league matches in succession without conceding a goal from January to March 2007 under manager Jim Gannon, a Football League record. Wayne Hennessey, then on loan from Wolverhampton Wanderers, kept a clean sheet in his first nine games in professional football. Hennessey received the League Two Player of the Month award in March. The other players involved were: Robert Clare, Michael Rose, Ashley Williams, Gareth Owen, Stephen Gleeson, Jason Taylor, Adam Griffin, David Poole, Damien Allen, Anthony Pilkington, Tony Dinning, Dominic Blizzard, Liam Dickinson, Adam Proudlock, Tes Bramble and Anthony Elding.
