= Edgeley Park =

Football stadium in Edgeley, Stockport, England

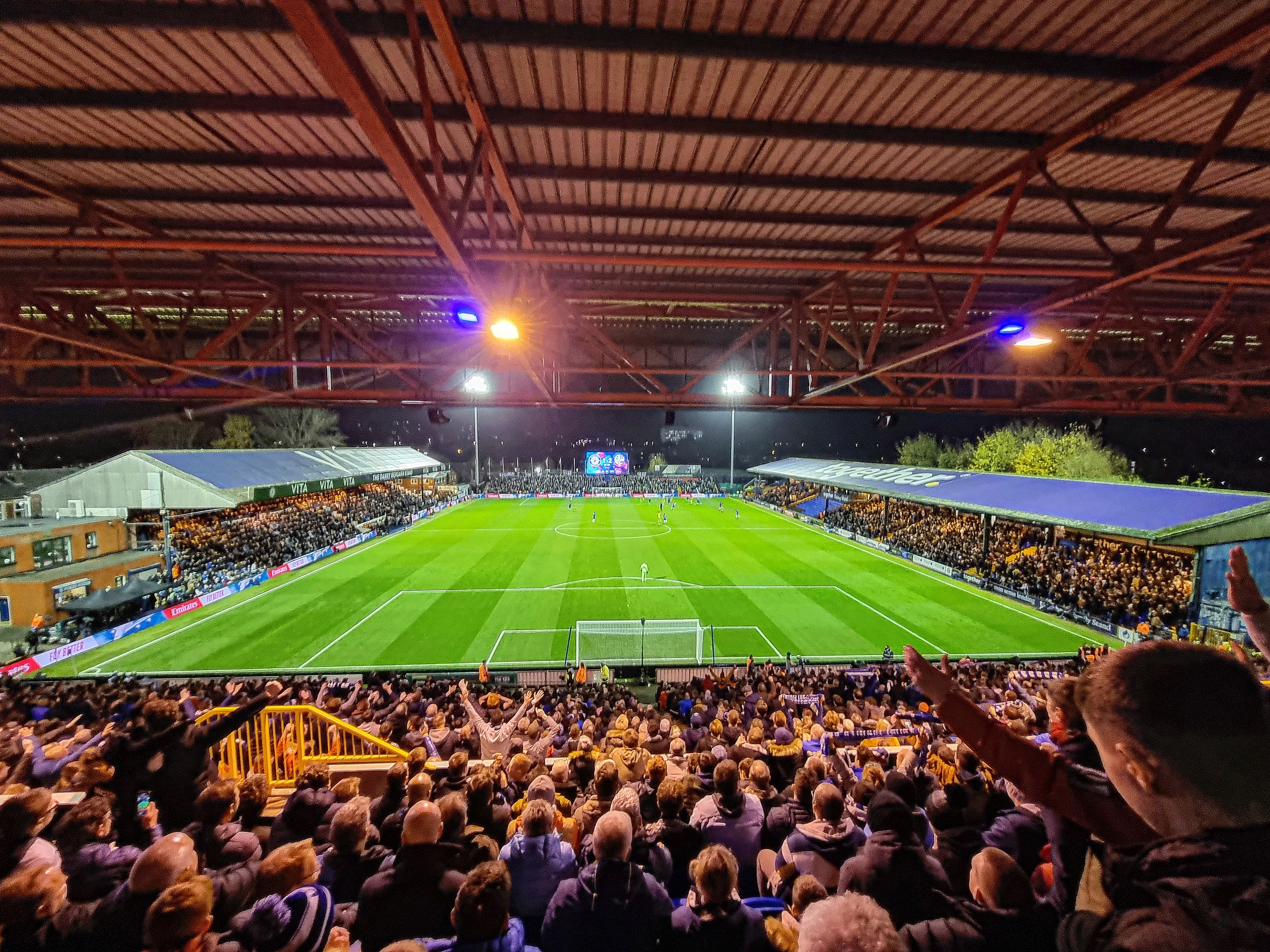
- View from the Cheadle End in 2021
- Interactive map of Edgeley Park
- Full name: Edgeley Park Stadium
- Location: Hardcastle Road; Stockport; SK3 9DD
- Coordinates: 53°23′59″N 2°9′59″W
- Capacity: 10,852
- Surface: SISGrass hybrid
- Field size: 111 x 71 yards

Construction
- Built: 1891
- Opened: 1891

Tenants
- Stockport RFC (1891–1903); Stockport County (1902–present); Sale Sharks (2003–2012)

Edgeley Park is a football stadium in Edgeley, Stockport, England. Built for Stockport RFC, a rugby league club, in 1891, Stockport County Football Club moved in by 1902, a year before the rugby club went defunct. Sale Sharks Rugby Union Club also played at the ground between 2003 and 2012.

Edgeley Park is currently an all-seater stadium holding 10,900 spectators but is set to be increased to a capacity of around 18,000, with the start of the project in 2025.

In 2015, Stockport Council purchased the stadium for around £2 million, leasing it back to the football club, in order to prevent it from being demolished and redeveloped.

== History ==
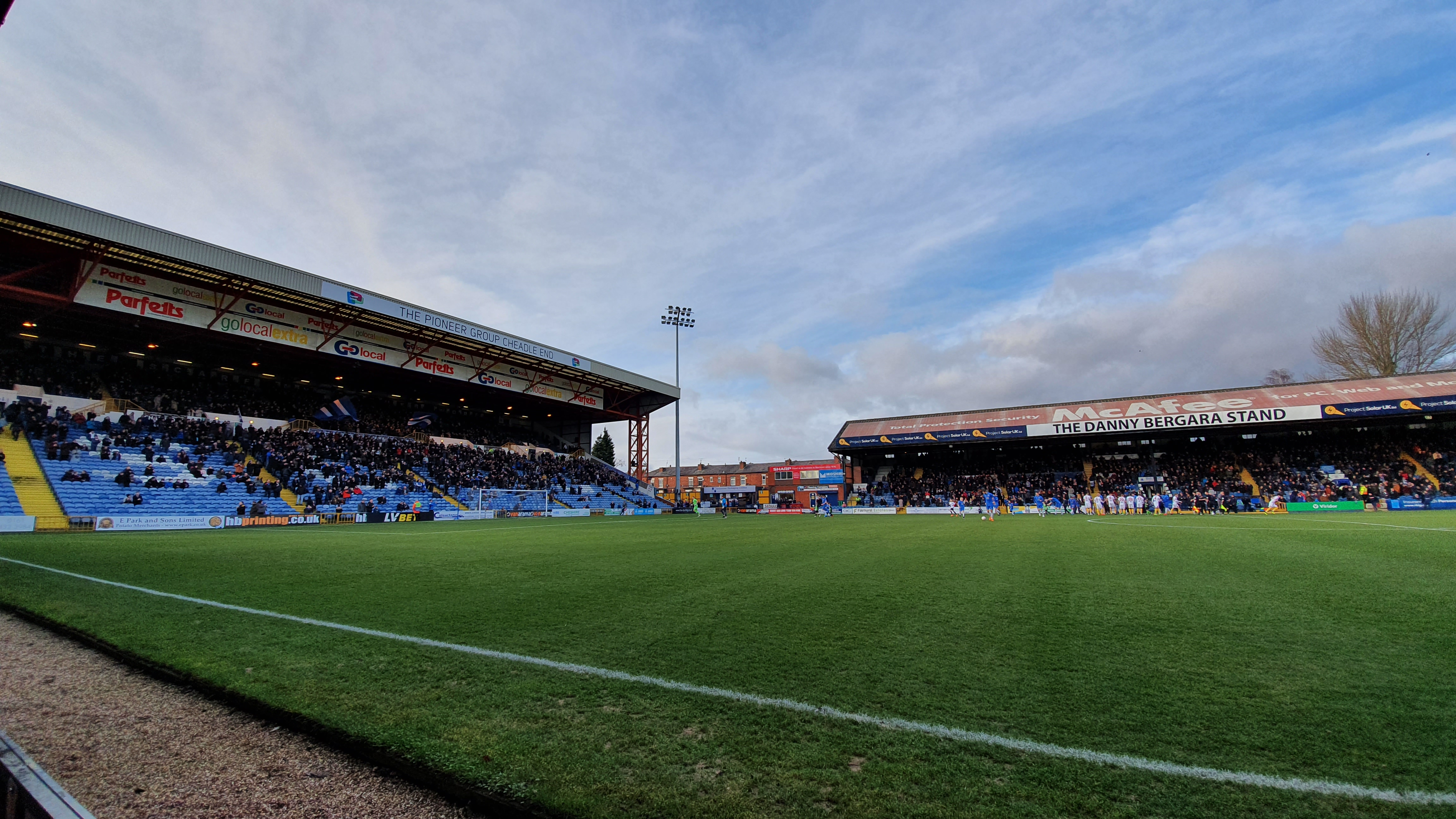
Cheadle End and Danny Bergara Stand, January 2020

The land Edgeley Park is built on was originally donated to Stockport by the Sykes Family (owners of Sykes Bleaching Company) in the late 1800s, for sporting use. The stadium was built in 1891 for rugby league club Stockport RFC. Stockport County FC moved there from Green Lane in 1902, needing to find a bigger stadium to play in following their entrance into the Football League two years earlier. Stockport County's first game at Edgeley Park was a 1–1 draw against Gainsborough Trinity in 1902.

The Sykes family sold the site to Stockport County in 1932 for £1,600.

The Main Stand of the ground, which, at the time was made of wood, burnt down in 1935, destroying all of Stockport County's previous records; therefore, apart from having to rebuild a significant section of the ground, the club had to undertake a massive task to piece together information about previous results, playing squads, etc.

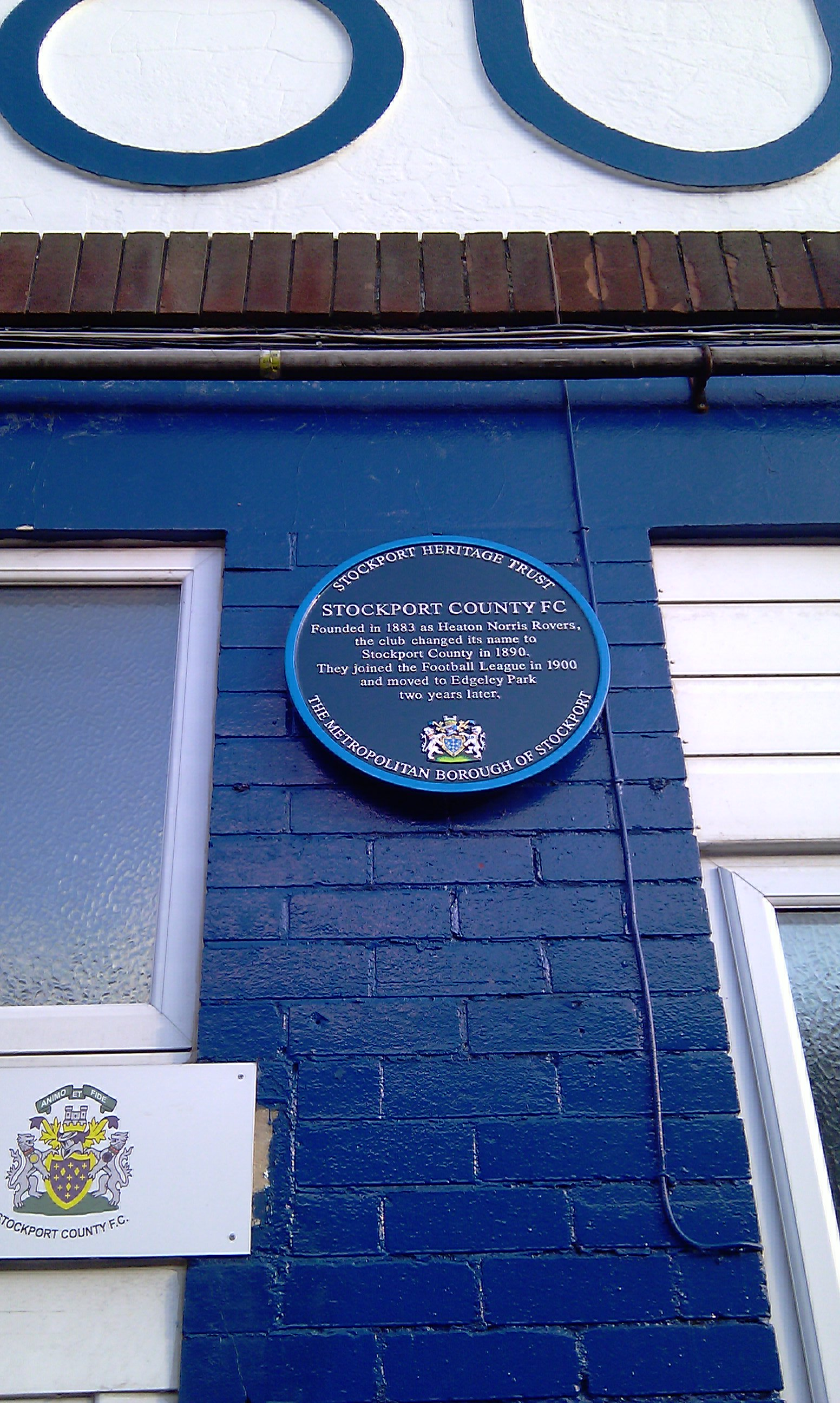
Blue plaque awarded to Stockport County in 2008

The record attendance is 27,833, when Liverpool visited Edgeley Park to play Stockport in the fifth round of the FA Cup in 1950.

The floodlighting system was first used for an opening friendly match against Fortuna '54 Geleen of Holland on 16 October 1956, whose side included four members of the Dutch national team that had defeated Belgium the previous week.

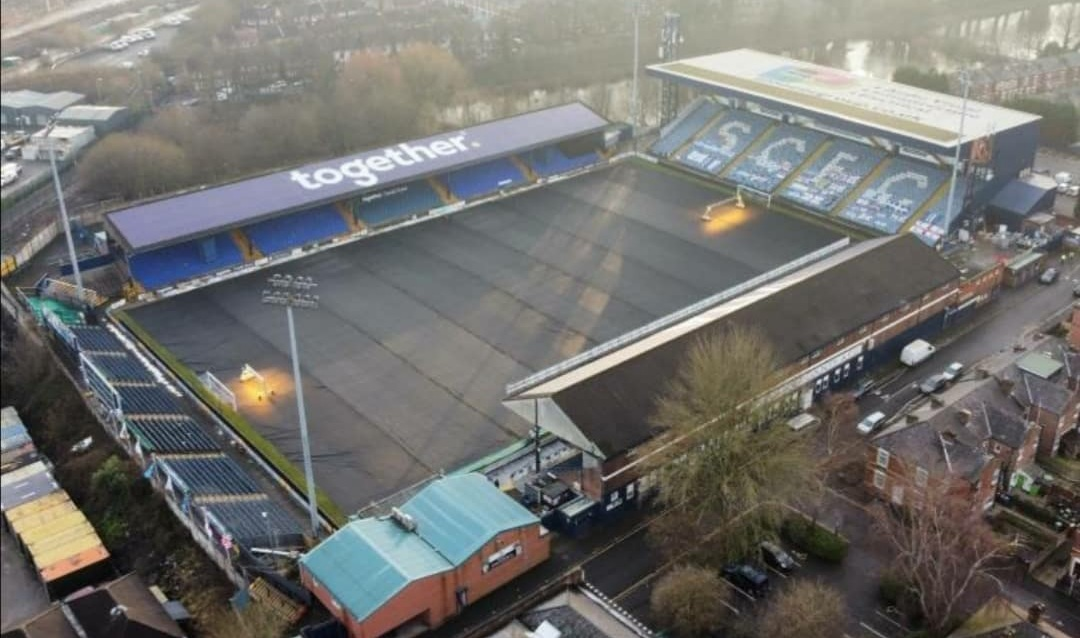
An aerial shot of Edgeley Park in early 2021

The ground once held two matches by the England international football team on the same day. On 14 January 1958 the England squad were due to play training matches at Manchester City's Maine Road but the pitch was frozen. Edgeley Park's pitch was deemed playable so it was decided to hold the matches in Stockport instead.

The first game saw England draw 2–2 with a Manchester City XI, and the second saw the England senior side defeat the England U23 side 1–0.

Edgeley Park was the venue for the final of the 1978 World Lacrosse Championship.

Following the Bradford City stadium fire in 1985, work began to remove all wooden structures and standing terraces from the stadium, which drastically reduced the capacity, but increased safety and ensured that the ground complied with Football League regulations. This work was eventually fully completed by 2001, with the Railway End being the last stand to be converted from a standing terrace to seating. The stadium's name is often simply abbreviated to "EP" by fans.

Chester City played a home Rumbelows Cup tie against Manchester City at Edgeley Park on 8 October 1991, owing to safety concerns regarding their temporary Moss Rose home.

Stockport County has undertaken a complete redevelopment of the stadium since moving into the ground, including the building of the Cheadle End which opened in 1995.

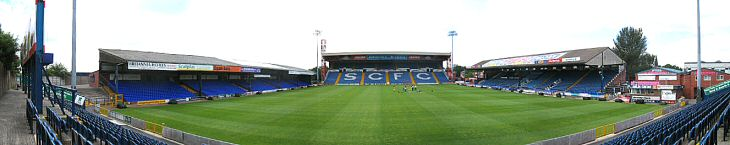
Edgeley Park, 2005

On 31 July 2015 Edgeley Park passed into the ownership of Stockport Council. In February 2022, the club agreed a 250-year lease of Edgeley Park from the council.

In July 2020; due to the COVID-19 pandemic in the UK, sporting venues had their capacities cut. Edgeley Park capacity was reduced to 2,700. However, no fans were allowed into the stadium for the start of the 2020–21 season. This did not stop the stadium being redeveloped, with new seating put into the Railway End and new external cladding added to the Cheadle End.

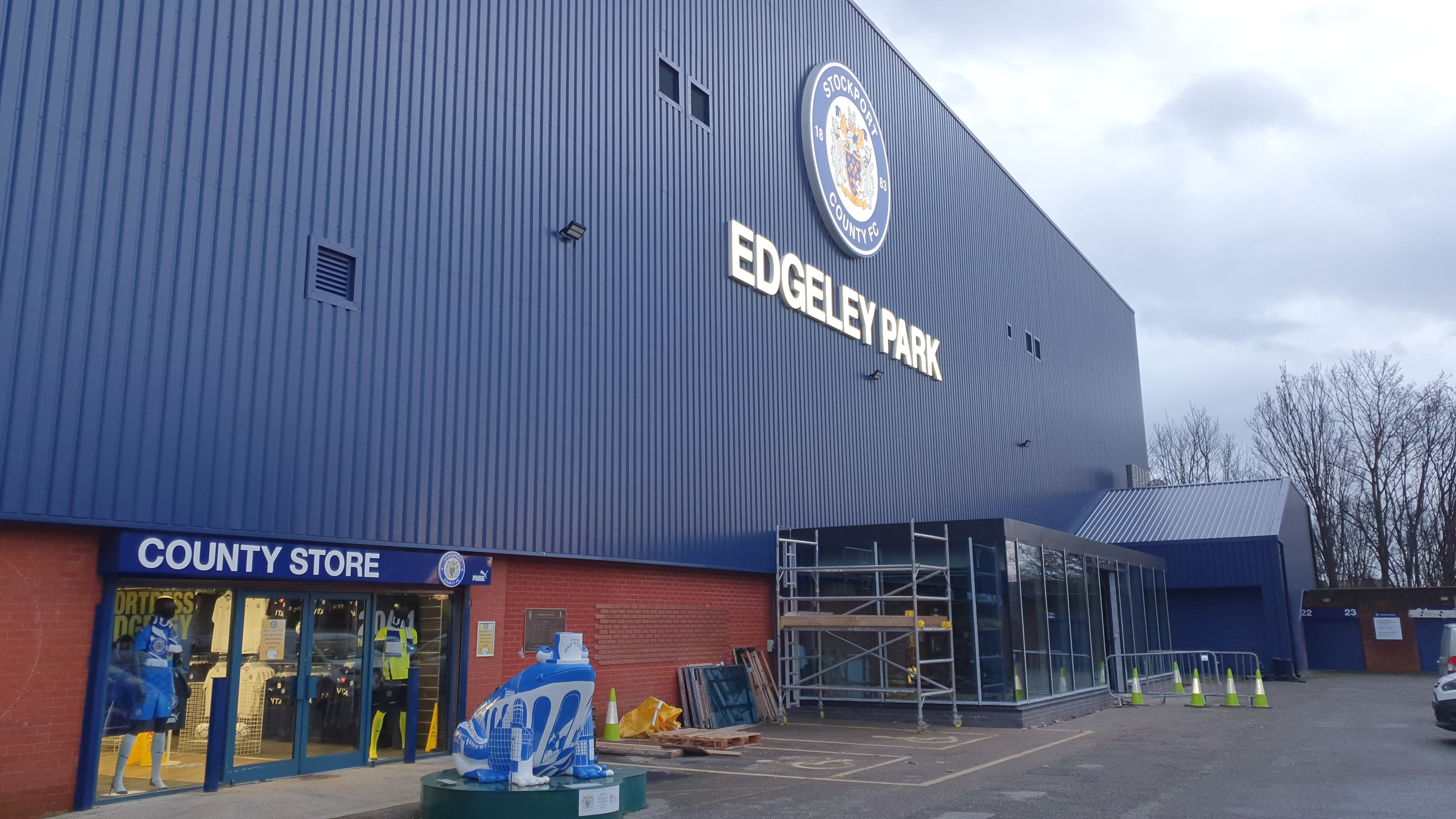
New cladding fit on the Cheadle End, December 2020

=== Danny Bergara Stand ===
The first major development at Edgeley Park was the construction of the original Main Stand on the north (Hardcastle Road) side of the ground. Initially holding around 500 seats, this was a relatively low timber structure and it was totally destroyed by a fire in 1935. It was replaced a year later by the current stand, constructed of brick and steel, a building seen by many as a traditional, old-fashioned stand, typical of football stadia in Northern England. The roof of the Main Stand at Edgeley Park is supported towards the front by three steel columns, which slightly impede the view of supporters from certain seats. Unusually, rather than running the length of the pitch, as would normally be expected in football stadia nowadays, the Main Stand is only about 75 yards long, straddling the halfway line, with the gaps at each end containing other club-related buildings.

The Main Stand seats 2,020, of which 405 are executive seats, and contains the changing rooms and some club offices, as well as toilets, boardroom and several bars for half-time refreshments. The team dugouts are situated at the front of the Main Stand.

On 23 May 2012, it was announced that Stockport County was to rename the Main Stand in honour of their late manager Danny Bergara.

=== Cheadle End ===
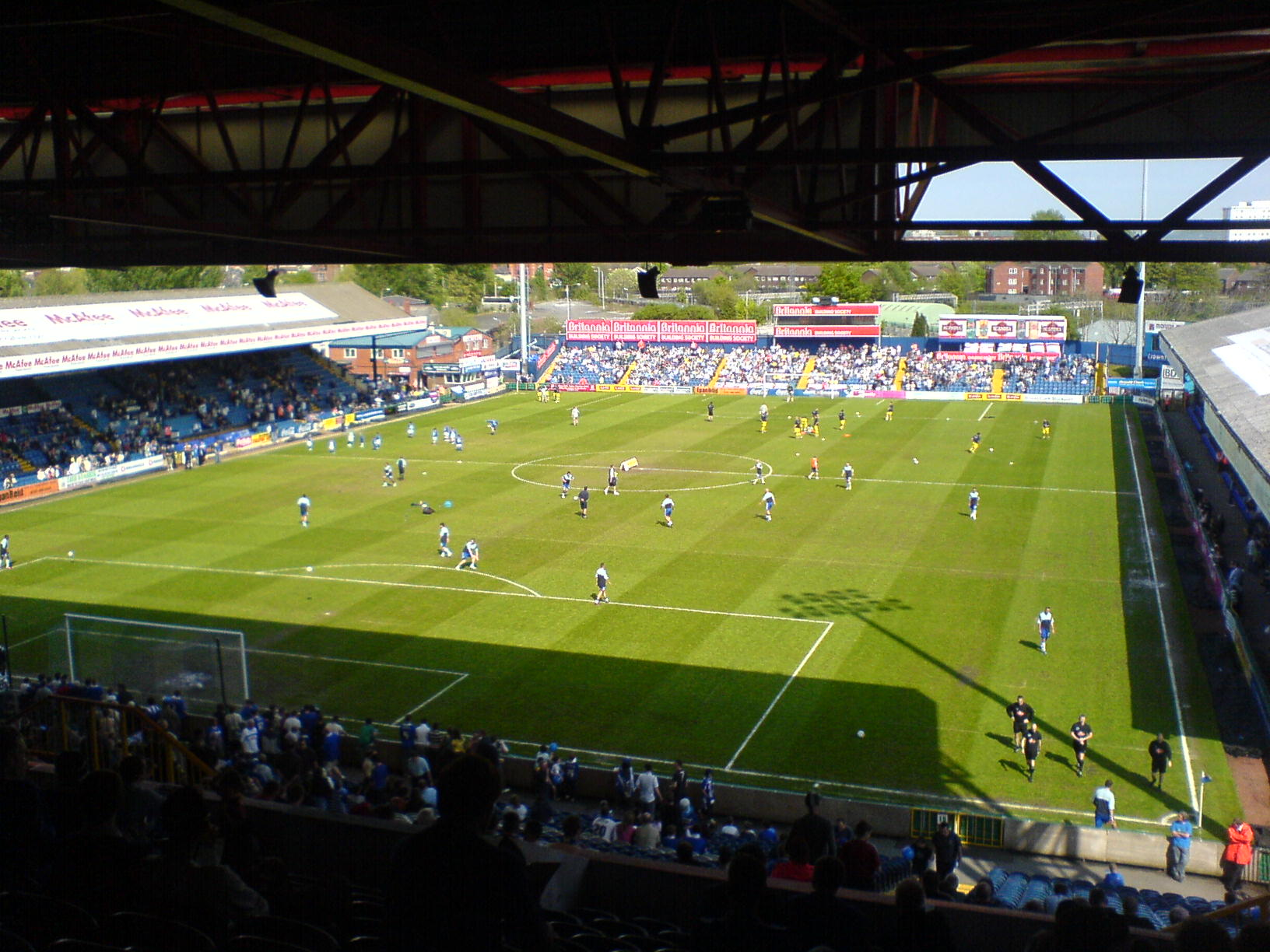
View from the Cheadle End, April 2007

The Cheadle End behind the goal at the west end of the ground is the largest and most modern stand in the stadium, and one of the largest stands outside the Premier League.

The original Cheadle End, built in 1923, was a small, covered terrace of largely timber construction, with room for around 3,000 people. It was made all-seater in 1967, and its capacity was cut to 1,100. This stand was demolished in 1985 following the Bradford City stadium fire and replaced by seven steps of shallow uncovered terracing which held only a small number of supporters. However, for the ten years that it existed, this terrace was extremely popular with County fans because of its traditional feel. Netting was controversially placed in front of the terrace during the late 1980s, but was removed following the Hillsborough disaster in 1989.

In 1995, Stockport County chairman Brendan Elwood built a new stand to replace the small terrace. The new Cheadle End is a two-tiered stand, accommodating 5,044 supporters, making it almost as large in terms of capacity as the other three stands collectively. The stand was opened as an all-seater, as is the rest of the stadium, and was opened in 1995 with a friendly game against Manchester City. The letters "SCFC" are spelled out with white seats in the stand. From the 2025/26 season, the upper rows of the Cheadle End are a designated 'safe-standing' area.

The stand holds the Insider Suite, a conference and banqueting facility, as well as the ticket office, toilets, refreshments facilities and the club shops; the club shop is relatively large, and was used by Stockport until 2005. However, when Sale Sharks owner Brian Kennedy sold Stockport County at that time, they vacated the club shop – moving to a former cupboard under the stairs around the corner. They returned to the large club shop in November 2012 following Sale Sharks move to the AJ Bell Stadium in Eccles.

=== Family Stand ===
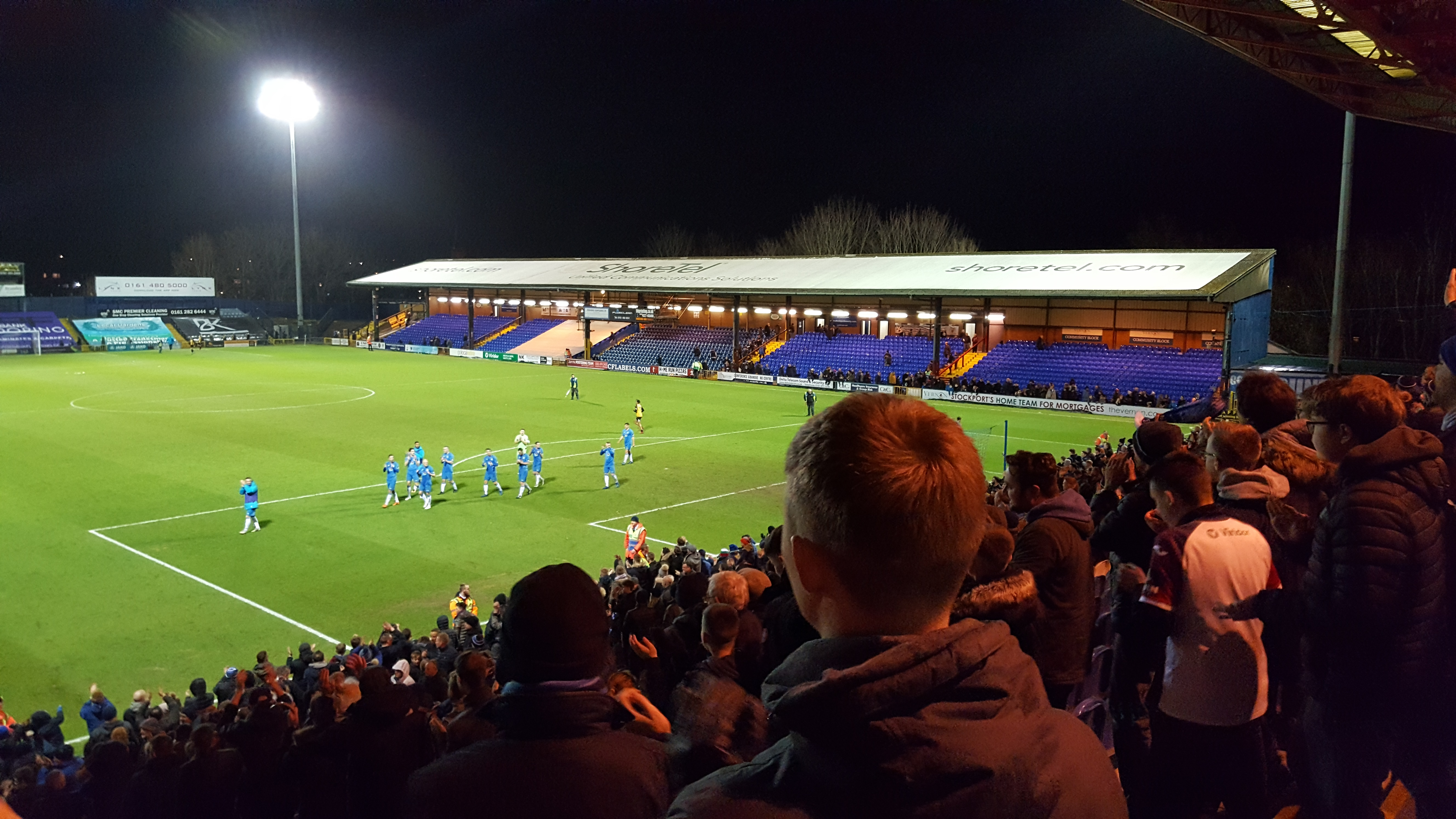
Pop Side, March 2019

On the opposite side of the ground to the Main Stand, running the full length of the pitch, is the Family Stand. It is also often referred to as the Pop Side, Barlow Stand, or the Vernon Stand due to the former sponsorship of the stand by the Vernon Building Society.

The first structure on this side of the ground was a small, covered enclosure with a capacity of 1,400. This was replaced in 1927 with a much larger terraced stand, which, during an FA Cup match against Liverpool in 1965, held 16,000 people. In 1978 the terracing at the rear of the stand was levelled and its capacity halved; eventually, in late 1993, the Pop Side was made all-seater.

It currently holds 2,411 and is occasionally given to larger away supporters if seats are not required by home supporters. There are toilets and refreshment facilities on a small outdoor concourse behind the stand, which backs onto a small reservoir. As with the Main Stand opposite, the roof is supported towards the front by several steel columns; their thickness and location are partly explained by the fact that when the current roof was built, in 1956, it had to be erected in front of an existing roof, which covered only the rear part of the then much deeper and higher terrace.

The stand also houses the media gantry for the club, where the footage for the club is recorded and where commentary takes place.

=== Railway End ===
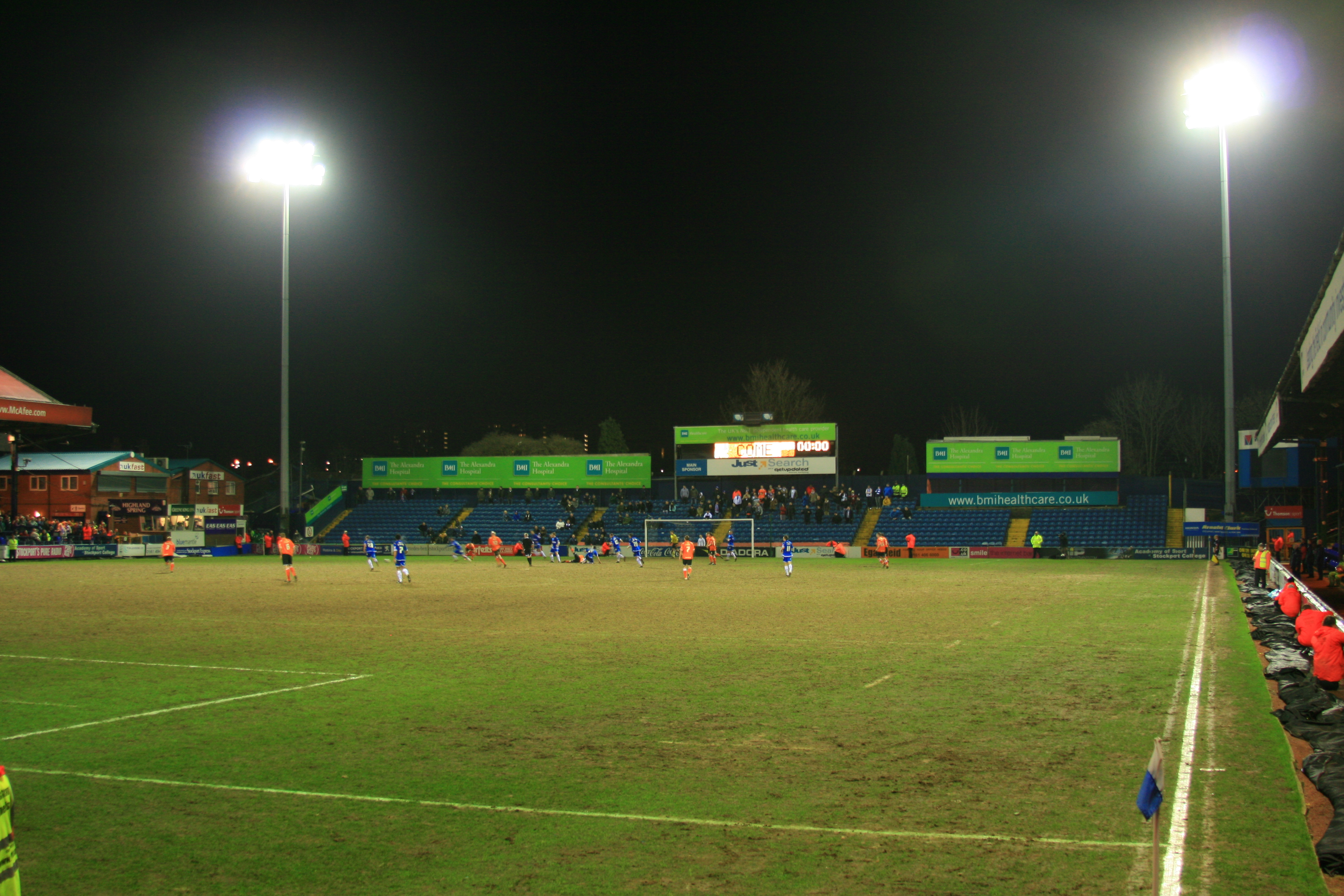
Railway End, February 2009

The Railway End, at the east end of the stadium, is a former uncovered terrace that at one time could hold up to 6,000. In 2001, it was the last part of Edgeley Park to be converted to seating, thus making the ground all-seated, and it is now generally used to house away supporters. Open to the elements, and with a capacity of around 1,366, the Railway End is currently the smallest of all stands in the ground. The stadium scoreboard is located at the rear of the Railway End.

In the late 1990s, after the recent major development at the Cheadle End of the ground, County chairman Brendan Elwood announced plans to rebuild the Railway End. The plan would have involved purchasing The Bungalow behind it, on which a hotel would have been built by Britannia Building Society, which would have overlooked the ground. However, like other Millennium-related projects, these plans never came to fruition.

The seating was replaced in 2020 with the word "COUNTY" spelt out in white letters on the blue seats. In 2025, A temporary roof was added to the railway end. Stockport hosted the first game with the new roof on where they beat Blackpool 1-0

=== Future development ===
In August 2025, Stockport Council’s planning committee approved plans to expand stadium capacity by 7,400 seats bringing total capacity to 18,000 seats. Phase One will replace the East Stand (or Railway End) from the current uncovered 1,366-seat stand to an approximately 4,500-seats covered stand. This will make it similar to the existing West Stand (or Cheadle End) albeit with a slightly lower capacity. Plans for construction to start in 2023 have been delayed, with the club applying in July 2025 for permission to add temporary roofing to the Railway End. Phase Two will be to rebuild the South Stand (otherwise the Pop Side, Family Stand or Barlow Stand), increasing the stand's capacity from 2,411 to 6,500 seats. Phase Three relates to the Main Stand (the Danny Bergara Stand) and would expand the existing stand to the full length of the pitch. This would mean an increase in capacity from just over 2,000 to around 3,500 seats.

== Gaming ==
Edgeley Park appears in Rugby Challenge 2 as one of five licensed English stadiums. The stadium also appears on EA Sports Rugby 08. Edgeley Park appears in the trailer of football video game FIFA 22. However, it is not a playable stadium in the game itself.

Preceded by Green Lane; 1889–1902	Stockport County; Home Ground; 1902–present	Succeeded by Current

Preceded by Heywood Road; 1905–2003	Sale Sharks; Home Ground; 2003–2012	Succeeded by Salford City Stadium; 2012–present
