= 2022–23 Everton F.C. season =

English football club season

Everton F.C.
2022–23 season
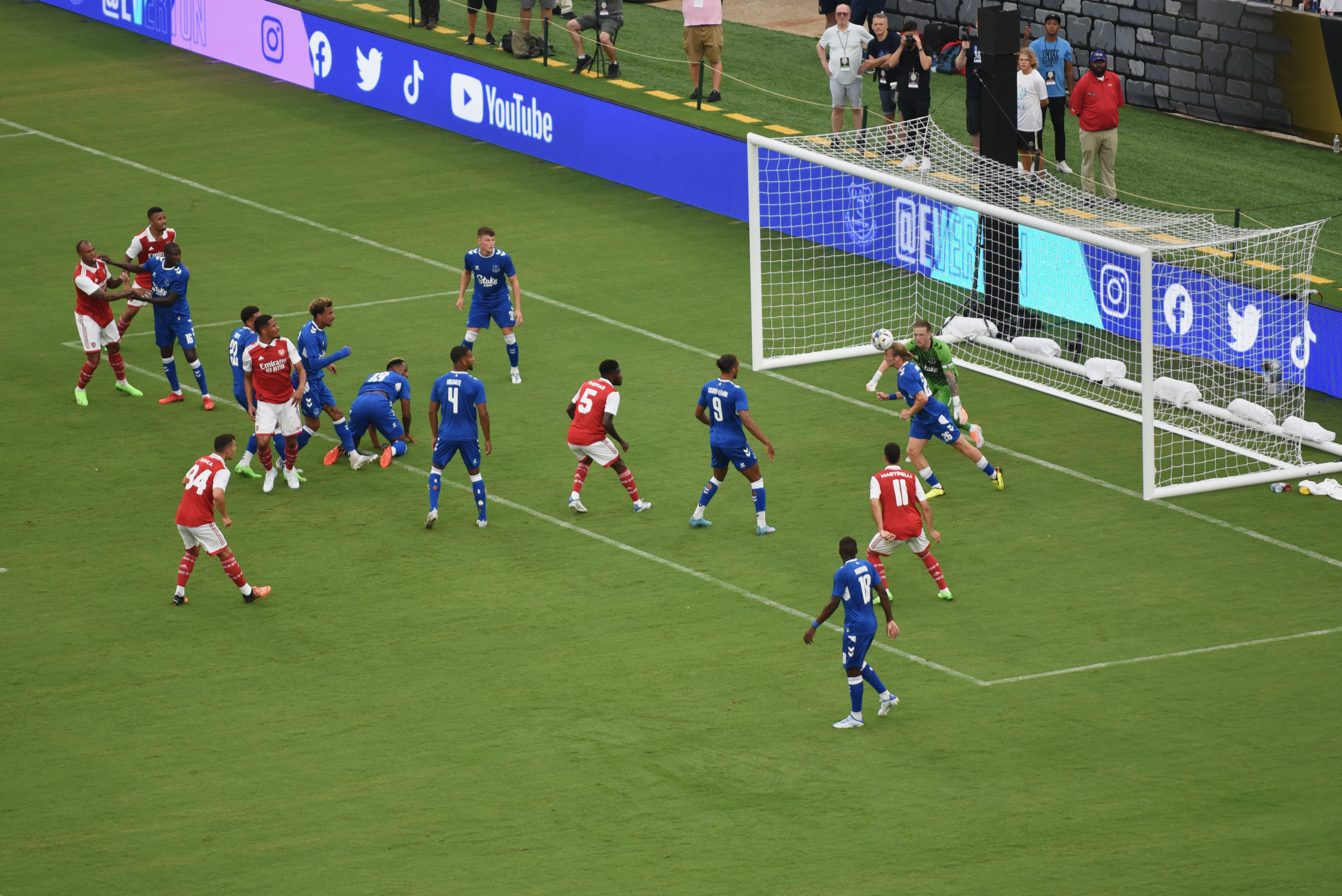
- Everton playing against Arsenal during pre-season
- Owner: Farhad Moshiri
- Chairman: Bill Kenwright
- Manager: Frank Lampard (until 23 January 2023); Sean Dyche (from 30 January 2023)
- Stadium: Goodison Park
- Premier League: 17th
- FA Cup: Third Round
- EFL Cup: Third Round
- Top goalscorer: League: Dwight McNeil (7); All: Dwight McNeil (7)
- Highest home attendance: 39,395 vs Bournemouth (28 May 2023, Premier League)
- Lowest home attendance: 38,939 vs Crystal Palace (22 October 2022, Premier League)
- Average home league attendance: 39,222
Home colours	Away colours	Third colours

The 2022–23 season was the 144th season in the existence of Everton Football Club and the club's 69th consecutive season in the top flight of English football. In addition to the league, they also competed in the FA Cup and the EFL Cup.

Everton were in danger of relegation for the entire Premier League season, the Toffees ultimately preserved their top flight status on the last day of the campaign with a 1–0 win over Bournemouth, thus avoiding a return to the second tier of English football for the first time since the 1953–54 season.

== Squad ==
No.	Player	Nationality	Date of birth	Signed from
Goalkeepers
1	Jordan Pickford	(England)	7 March 1994 (age 32)	(England) Sunderland
15	Asmir Begovic	(Bosnia and Herzegovina)	20 June 1987 (age 39)	(England) Bournemouth
31	Andy Lonergan	(England)	19 October 1983 (age 43)	(England) West Brom
Defenders
2	James Tarkowski	(England)	19 November 1992 (age 33)	(England) Burnley
3	Nathan Patterson	(Scotland)	16 October 2001 (age 25)	(Scotland) Rangers
4	Mason Holgate	(England)	22 October 1996 (age 30)	(England) Barnsley
5	Michael Keane	(England)	11 January 1993 (age 33)	(England) Burnley
13	Yerry Mina	(Colombia)	23 September 1994 (age 32)	(Spain) Barcelona
19	Vitaliy Mykolenko	(Ukraine)	29 May 1999 (age 27)	(Ukraine) Dynamo Kyiv
22	Ben Godfrey	(England)	15 January 1998 (age 28)	(England) Norwich City
23	Seamus Coleman	(Republic of Ireland)	11 October 1988 (age 38)	(Republic of Ireland) Sligo Rovers
29	Rúben Vinagre	(Portugal)	9 April 1999 (age 27)	(Portugal) Sporting CP
30	Conor Coady	(England)	25 February 1993 (age 33)	(England) Wolverhampton Wanderers
Midfielders
8	Amadou Onana	(Belgium)	16 August 2001 (age 25)	(France) Lille
16	Abdoulaye Doucoure	(Mali)	1 January 1993 (age 33)	(England) Watford
17	Alex Iwobi	(Nigeria)	3 May 1996 (age 30)	(England) Arsenal
26	Tom Davies	(England)	30 June 1998 (age 28)	N/A
27	Idrissa Gueye	(Senegal)	26 September 1989 (age 37)	(France) Paris Saint-Germain
37	James Garner	(England)	13 March 2001 (age 25)	(England) Manchester United
Forwards
7	Dwight McNeil	(England)	22 November 1999 (age 26)	(England) Burnley
9	Dominic Calvert-Lewin	(England)	16 March 1997 (age 29)	(England) Sheffield United
11	Demarai Gray	(Jamaica)	28 June 1996 (age 30)	(Germany) Bayer Leverkusen
14	Andros Townsend	(England)	16 July 1991 (age 35)	(England) Crystal Palace
20	Neal Maupay	(France)	14 August 1996 (age 30)	(England) Brighton & Hove Albion
50	Ellis Simms	(England)	5 January 2001 (age 25)	N/A

== Transfers ==
All fees stated underneath are including potential add-ons.

=== In ===
Date	Pos	Player	Transferred from	Fee	Ref
2 July 2022	DF	(England) James Tarkowski	(England) Burnley	Free Transfer	
28 July 2022	MF	(England) Dwight McNeil	(England) Burnley	£15,000,000	
9 August 2022	MF	(Belgium) Amadou Onana	(France) Lille	£30,000,000	
26 August 2022	FW	(France) Neal Maupay	(England) Brighton & Hove Albion	£12,000,000	
1 September 2022	MF	(England) James Garner	(England) Manchester United	£9,000,000	
1 September 2022	MF	(Senegal) Idrissa Gueye	(France) Paris Saint-Germain	£2,000,000	
13 September 2022	GK	(Switzerland) Eldin Jakupovic	(England) Leicester City	Free Transfer	
1 January 2023	FW	(England) Ellis Simms	(England) Sunderland	Loan Return	
Total				£68,000,000	

=== Out ===
Date	Pos	Player	Transferred to	Fee	Ref
30 June 2022	DF	(England) Jonjoe Kenny	(Germany) Hertha BSC	Released	
30 June 2022	MF	(England) Fabian Delph	Retired	Released	
30 June 2022	MF	(Iceland) Gylfi Sigurðsson	Unattached	Released	
30 June 2022	FW	(Turkey) Cenk Tosun	(Turkey) Beşiktaş	Released	
1 July 2022	FW	(Brazil) Richarlison	(England) Tottenham Hotspur	£60,000,000	
25 September 2022	MF	(Brazil) Allan	(United Arab Emirates) Al Wahda	£4,000,000	
16 December 2022	FW	(Venezuela) Salomon Rondon	(Argentina) River Plate	Mutual consent	
9 January 2023	FW	(Wales) Nathan Broadhead	(England) Ipswich Town	£3,000,000	
10 January 2023	GK	(Switzerland) Eldin Jakupovic	(United States) Los Angeles	Free Transfer	
19 January 2023	MF	(England) Seb Quirk	(England) Accrington Stanley	Undisclosed	
29 January 2023	FW	(England) Anthony Gordon	(England) Newcastle United	£45,000,000	
31 January 2023	DF	(England) Joe Anderson	(England) Sunderland	Undisclosed	
Total				£112,000,000	

=== Loans in ===
Date	Pos	Player	Loaned from	On loan until	Ref
27 July 2022	DF	(Portugal) Rúben Vinagre	(Portugal) Sporting CP	End of Season	
8 August 2022	DF	(England) Conor Coady	(England) Wolverhampton Wanderers	End of Season	

=== Loans out ===
Date	Pos	Player	Loaned to	On loan until	Ref
8 July 2022	GK	(England) Harry Tyrer	(England) Chester	End of Season	
8 July 2022	GK	(Portugal) Joao Virginia	(Netherlands) SC Cambuur	End of Season	
13 July 2022	DF	(Wales) Ryan Astley	(England) Accrington Stanley	End of Season	
17 July 2022	DF	(England) Jarrad Branthwaite	(Netherlands) PSV Eindhoven	End of Season	
27 July 2022	MF	(England) Tyler Onyango	(England) Burton Albion	18 January 2023 (Note: On 18 January, Onyango was recalled from his season-long loan at Burton and was subsequently loan to Forest Green)	
29 July 2022	FW	(England) Ellis Simms	(England) Sunderland	1 January 2023 (Note: On 31 December, Simms was recalled from his season-long loan at Sunderland)	
3 August 2022	FW	(England) Lewis Dobbin	(England) Derby County	End of Season	
9 August 2022	FW	(Wales) Nathan Broadhead	(England) Wigan Athletic	6 January 2023 (Note: On 6 January, Broadhead was recalled from his season-long loan at Wigan and was subsequently sold to Ipswich)	
12 August 2022	DF	(England) Lewis Gibson	(England) Bristol Rovers	End of Season	
25 August 2022	MF	(England) Dele Alli	(Turkey) Beşiktaş	End of Season	
27 August 2022	MF	(Ivory Coast) Jean-Philippe Gbamin	(Turkey) Trabzonspor	End of Season	
27 August 2022	DF	(France) Niels Nkounkou	(Wales) Cardiff City	14 January 2023 (Note: On 14 January, Nkounkou was recalled from his season-long loan at Cardiff and was subsequently loaned to Saint-Étienne)	
1 September 2022	MF	(Portugal) André Gomes	(France) Lille	End of Season	
1 September 2022	MF	(England) Lewis Warrington	(England) Fleetwood Town	End of Season	
10 January 2023	FW	(Republic of Ireland) Thomas Cannon	(England) Preston North End	End of Season	
14 January 2023	DF	(France) Niels Nkounkou	(France) Saint-Étienne	End of Season	
27 January 2023	MF	(England) Tyler Onyango	(England) Forest Green Rovers	End of Season	

== Kits ==
Home	Home Alt.	Home Alt. 2	Away	Third

== Management team ==
Position	Name
Manager	(England) Sean Dyche
Assistant Manager	(England) Ian Woan
First Team Coaches	(England) Steve Stone
Head of Performance	(England) Mark Howard
Goalkeeping Coach	(Republic of Ireland) Alan Kelly

_{Manager Frank Lampard, as well as coaches Joe Edwards, Paul Clement, Ashley Cole and Chris Jones have all left the club as of 23 January 2023.}

== Pre-season and friendlies ==
Everton announced they would return to the United States for two pre-season friendlies against Arsenal and Minnesota United. On the club's return to the UK, the Toffees travel to Bloomfield Road to take on Blackpool. On July 12, Everton announced they would host Dynamo Kyiv in a pre-season friendly to raise funds for the Ukraine Humanitatian charities.

During mid-season, the Toffees announced they would be part of the inaugural Sydney Super Cup in November, against Celtic and Western Sydney Wanderers.

Win Draw Loss Fixtures

Preseason

17 July 2022 Friendly	Everton	0–2	Arsenal	Baltimore, United States
00:00 BST	Godfrey (yellow card) 44'; Gbamin (yellow card) 79'	Report	Gabriel Jesus 33'; Saka 36'; Marí (yellow card) 89'	Stadium: M&T Bank Stadium; Attendance: 39,245

21 July 2022 Friendly	Minnesota United	4–0	Everton	Saint Paul, United States
1:00 BST	Reynoso 18' (pen.); Keane 32' (o.g.); Amarilla 36'; Danladi 78'	Report	Godfrey (yellow card) 87'	Stadium: Allianz Field

24 July 2022 Friendly	Blackpool	2–4	Everton	Blackpool
15:00 BST	Madine 44'; Connolly 51'	Report	Mykolenko 6'; Davies 11'; Alli 48', 64'	Stadium: Bloomfield Road

29 July 2022 Global Tour for Peace	Everton	3–0	Dynamo Kyiv	Walton
19:45 BST	Calvert-Lewin 4'; McNeil 73', 78'	Report		Stadium: Goodison Park

Mid-season

20 November 2022 Sydney Super Cup	Celtic	0–0 (2–4 p)	Everton	Sydney Olympic Park, Australia
20:05 AEST		Report	Patterson (yellow card) 44'	Stadium: Accor Stadium; Attendance: 41,121; Referee: Jarred Gillett (Australia)
	Penalties
	Giakoumakis (penalty missed); Hatate (penalty missed); Forrest (penalty scored); Abada (penalty scored)		(penalty scored) Keane; (penalty scored) Cannon; (penalty scored) Patterson; (penalty missed) Mills; (penalty scored) Gordon

23 November 2022 Sydney Super Cup	Western Sydney Wanderers	1–5	Everton	Parramatta, Australia
19:45 AEST	Najjarine 17'; Lopane (yellow card) 55'; Cleur (yellow card) 83'	Report	Maupay 14'; Gordon 30', 59', 90'; Price (yellow card) 57'; Cannon 66'	Stadium: CommBank Stadium; Attendance: 14,522; Referee: Adam Kersey (Australia)

== Competitions ==
=== Overall record ===
Competition	First match	Last match	Starting round	Final position	Record							
Competition	First match	Last match	Starting round	Final position	Pld	W	D	L	GF	GA	GD	Win %
Premier League	6 August 2022	28 May 2023	Matchday 1	17th	38	8	12	18	34	57	−23	21.05
FA Cup	6 January 2023		Third round	Third round	1	0	0	1	1	3	−2	0.00
EFL Cup	23 August 2022	8 November 2022	Second round	Third round	2	1	0	1	2	4	−2	50.00
Total					41	9	12	20	37	64	−27	21.95

Source: Soccerway

=== Premier League ===
==== League table ====
Pos	Team	Pld	W	D	L	GF	GA	GD	Pts	Qualification or relegation
15	Bournemouth	38	11	6	21	37	71	−34	39	
16	Nottingham Forest	38	9	11	18	38	68	−30	38	
17	Everton	38	8	12	18	34	57	−23	36	
18	Leicester City (R)	38	9	7	22	51	68	−17	34	Relegation to EFL Championship
19	Leeds United (R)	38	7	10	21	48	78	−30	31	Relegation to EFL Championship

Source: Premier League
Rules for classification: 1) Points; 2) Goal difference; 3) Goals scored; 4) If the champions, relegated teams or qualified teams for UEFA competitions cannot be determined by rules 1 to 3, rules 4.1 to 4.3 are applied – 4.1) Points gained in head-to-head record between such teams; 4.2) Away goals scored in head-to-head record between such teams; 4.3) Play-offs
(R) Relegated

==== Results summary ====
Overall								Home						Away					
Pld	W	D	L	GF	GA	GD	Pts	W	D	L	GF	GA	GD	W	D	L	GF	GA	GD
38	8	12	18	34	57	−23	36	6	3	10	16	27	−11	2	9	8	18	30	−12

Source: Premier League

==== Results by round ====
Round	1	2	3	4	5	6	8	9	10	11	12	13	14	15	16	17	18	19	20	21	22	23	24	25	7	26	27	28	29	30	31	32	33	34	35	36	37	38
Ground	H	A	H	A	A	H	H	A	H	A	A	H	A	H	A	H	A	H	H	A	H	A	H	H	A	A	H	A	H	A	H	A	H	A	A	H	A	H
Result	L	L	D	D	D	D	W	W	L	L	L	W	D	L	L	L	D	L	L	L	W	L	W	L	L	D	W	D	D	L	L	D	L	D	W	L	D	W
Position	15	18	17	18	17	16	13	11	12	14	15	12	12	16	17	17	16	18	19	19	18	18	16	18	18	18	15	15	16	17	17	18	19	19	17	17	17	17

Source: Premier League
A = Away; H = Home; W = Win; D = Draw; L = Loss; P = Postponed

==== Matches ====
Win Draw Loss Fixtures

On 16 June, the Premier League fixtures were released.

6 August 2022 1	Everton	0–1	Chelsea	Walton, Liverpool
17:30 BST	Mina (yellow card) 45+8'; Mykolenko (yellow card) 80'; Holgate (yellow card) 90+8'	Report	Jorginho 45+9' (pen.); James (yellow card) 56'; Cucurella (yellow card) 90+11'	Stadium: Goodison Park; Attendance: 39,254; Referee: Craig Pawson

13 August 2022 2	Aston Villa	2–1	Everton	Aston, Birmingham
12:30 BST	Coutinho (yellow card) 29'; Ings 31', (yellow card) 75'; Digne (yellow card) 49'; Buendía 86'; Young (yellow card) 90+8'	Report	Davies (yellow card) 43'; Digne 87' (o.g.)	Stadium: Villa Park; Attendance: 41,883; Referee: Michael Oliver

20 August 2022 3	Everton	1–1	Nottingham Forest	Walton, Liverpool
15:00 BST	Gordon (yellow card) 21'; Iwobi (yellow card) 35'; Onana (yellow card) 60'; Gray 88'	Report	Worrall (yellow card) 20'; Williams (yellow card) 29'; Johnson 81'	Stadium: Goodison Park; Attendance: 39,271; Referee: Andre Marriner

27 August 2022 4	Brentford	1–1	Everton	Brentford
15:00 BST	Wissa (yellow card) 54'; Janelt 84'; Hickey (yellow card) 90+5'	Report	Gordon 24', (yellow card) 90+3'; Pickford (yellow card) 81'	Stadium: Gtech Community Stadium; Attendance: 17,009; Referee: John Brooks

30 August 2022 5	Leeds United	1–1	Everton	Beeston, Leeds
20:00 BST	Adams (yellow card) 40'; Sinisterra 55'; Llorente (yellow card) 57'; Kristensen (yellow card) 59'	Report	Gordon 17', (yellow card) 60'; Davies (yellow card) 20'; Patterson (yellow card) 67'	Stadium: Elland Road; Attendance: 36,338; Referee: Darren England

3 September 2022 6	Everton	0–0	Liverpool	Walton, Liverpool
12:30 BST	Onana (yellow card) 38'; Pickford (yellow card) 90+6'	Report	Van Dijk (yellow card) 76'; Fabinho (yellow card) 90+2'	Stadium: Goodison Park; Attendance: 39,240; Referee: Anthony Taylor

18 September 2022 8	Everton	1–0	West Ham United	Walton, Liverpool
14:15 BST	Coady (yellow card) 28'; Maupay 53'; Gordon (yellow card) 62'; McNeil (yellow card) 90+4'	Report	Scamacca (yellow card) 90+5'	Stadium: Goodison Park; Attendance: 39,298; Referee: Michael Oliver

1 October 2022 9	Southampton	1–2	Everton	Southampton
15:00 BST	Maitland-Niles (yellow card) 7'; Aribo 49'; Armstrong (yellow card) 85'	Report	Coady 52'; McNeil 54'; Gueye (yellow card) 83'	Stadium: St Mary's Stadium; Attendance: 30,510; Referee: Andre Marriner

9 October 2022 10	Everton	1–2	Manchester United	Walton, Liverpool
19:00 BST	Iwobi 5'; Onana (yellow card) 51'; Gordon (yellow card) 63'	Report	Antony 15'; Ronaldo 44'; McTominay (yellow card) 85'	Stadium: Goodison Park; Attendance: 39,258; Referee: David Coote

15 October 2022 11	Tottenham Hotspur	2–0	Everton	Tottenham
17:30 BST	Bentancur (yellow card) 37'; Kane 59' (pen.); Højbjerg 86'	Report	Maupay (yellow card) 12'; McNeil (yellow card) 44'; Gueye (yellow card) 54'; Mykolenko (yellow card) 81'	Stadium: Tottenham Hotspur Stadium; Attendance: 61,812; Referee: Paul Tierney

19 October 2022 12	Newcastle United	1–0	Everton	Newcastle upon Tyne
19:30 BST	Joelinton (yellow card) 24'; Almirón 30'; Schär (yellow card) 44'	Report	Calvert-Lewin (yellow card) 7'; Gordon (yellow card) 44'; Gueye (yellow card) 64'; Tarkowski (yellow card) 89'	Stadium: St James' Park; Attendance: 52,204; Referee: Tony Harrington

22 October 2022 13	Everton	3–0	Crystal Palace	Walton, Liverpool
15:00 BST	Calvert-Lewin 11'; Gordon 63'; Tarkowski (yellow card) 68'; Gray (yellow card) 70'; McNeil 84'; Garner (yellow card) 90+2'	Report	Zaha (yellow card) 68'; Guéhi (yellow card) 68'; Schlupp (yellow card) 68'; Mateta (yellow card) 80'	Stadium: Goodison Park; Attendance: 38,939; Referee: Simon Hooper

29 October 2022 14	Fulham	0–0	Everton	Fulham
17:30 BST	Mitrović (yellow card) 24'; Decordova-Reid (yellow card) 58'	Report	Onana (yellow card) 64'	Stadium: Craven Cottage; Attendance: 23,534; Referee: John Brooks

5 November 2022 15	Everton	0–2	Leicester City	Walton, Liverpool
17:30 GMT		Report	Tielemans 45'; Barnes 86'	Stadium: Goodison Park; Attendance: 39,206; Referee: David Coote

12 November 2022 16	Bournemouth	3–0	Everton	Kings Park, Bournemouth
15:00 GMT	Tavernier 18'; Moore 25'; Senesi (yellow card) 44'; Cook (yellow card) 45+2'; Anthony 69'	Report		Stadium: Vitality Stadium; Attendance: 10,382; Referee: Craig Pawson

26 December 2022 17	Everton	1–2	Wolverhampton Wanderers	Walton, Liverpool
15:00 GMT	Mina 7'; Patterson (yellow card) 38'	Report	Podence 22', (yellow card) 61'; Kilman (yellow card) 64'; Neves (yellow card) 79'; Toti (yellow card) 81'; Costa (yellow card) 90'; Aït-Nouri 90+5', (yellow card) 90+6'	Stadium: Goodison Park; Attendance: 39,252; Referee: Craig Pawson

31 December 2022 18	Manchester City	1–1	Everton	Manchester
15:00 GMT	Silva (yellow card) 16'; Haaland 24', (yellow card) 44'; De Bruyne (yellow card) 30'	Report	Patterson (yellow card) 33'; Tarkowski (yellow card) 45'; Onana (yellow card) 63'; Gray 64'	Stadium: Etihad Stadium; Attendance: 53,444; Referee: Andrew Madley

3 January 2023 19	Everton	1–4	Brighton & Hove Albion	Walton, Liverpool
19:45 GMT	Price (yellow card) 74'; Iwobi (yellow card) 75'; Doucouré (yellow card) 90'; Gray 90+2' (pen.)	Report	Mitoma 14'; Ferguson (yellow card) 45', (goal) 51'; March 54'; Groß 57'	Stadium: Goodison Park; Attendance: 39,103; Referee: Andre Marriner

14 January 2023 20	Everton	1–2	Southampton	Walton, Liverpool
15:00 GMT	Onana 39'	Report	Lavia (yellow card) 14'; Ward-Prowse 46', 78'; Diallo (yellow card) 69'; Lyanco (yellow card) 90+2'	Stadium: Goodison Park; Attendance: 39,305; Referee: John Brooks

21 January 2023 21	West Ham United	2–0	Everton	Stratford
15:00 GMT	Bowen 34', 41'; Paquetá (yellow card) 50'	Report	Tarkowski (yellow card) 67'	Stadium: London Stadium; Attendance: 62,470; Referee: Stuart Attwell

4 February 2023 22	Everton	1–0	Arsenal	Walton, Liverpool
12:30 GMT	Tarkowski 60'; Mykolenko (yellow card) 63'; Onana (yellow card) 69'; Pickford (yellow card) 86'; Maupay (yellow card) 90+6'	Report	Zinchenko (yellow card) 90+6'	Stadium: Goodison Park; Attendance: 39,314; Referee: David Coote

13 February 2023 23	Liverpool	2–0	Everton	Anfield, Liverpool
20:00 GMT	Salah 37'; Gakpo 49'; Robertson (yellow card) 87'	Report	Coady (yellow card) 67'; Doucouré (yellow card) 84'; Pickford (yellow card) 87'	Stadium: Anfield; Attendance: 53,027; Referee: Simon Hooper

18 February 2023 24	Everton	1–0	Leeds United	Walton, Liverpool
15:00 GMT	McNeil (yellow card) 44'; Doucouré (yellow card) 44'; Coleman 64'	Report	Adams (yellow card) 43'; McKennie (yellow card) 44'; Gnonto (yellow card) 90+5'	Stadium: Goodison Park; Attendance: 39,232; Referee: Andrew Madley

25 February 2023 25	Everton	0–2	Aston Villa	Walton, Liverpool
15:00 GMT	Onana (yellow card) 2'; Doucouré (yellow card) 75'	Report	Watkins 63' (pen.); Martínez (yellow card) 77'; Buendía 81'	Stadium: Goodison Park; Attendance: 39,309; Referee: Anthony Taylor

1 March 2023 7	Arsenal	4–0	Everton	Holloway
19:45 GMT	Saka 40'; Martinelli 45+1', 80'; Ødegaard 71'	Report	Tarkowski (yellow card) 51'; Godfrey (yellow card) 66'	Stadium: Emirates Stadium; Attendance: 60,213; Referee: Michael Oliver
Note: Originally scheduled for 11 September 2022, the fixture was postponed as a mark of respect following the passing of Queen Elizabeth II.

5 March 2023 26	Nottingham Forest	2–2	Everton	West Bridgford
14:00 GMT	Johnson 19', 77'; Gibbs-White (yellow card) 51'; Lodi (yellow card) 55'; Felipe (yellow card) 79'	Report	Gray 10' (pen.), (yellow card) 56'; Doucouré 29'; Godfrey (yellow card) 42'; McNeil (yellow card) 52'; Tarkowski (yellow card) 57'; Davies (yellow card) 90+4'	Stadium: City Ground; Attendance: 29,353; Referee: John Brooks

11 March 2023 27	Everton	1–0	Brentford	Walton, Liverpool
15:00 GMT	McNeil 1'; Coleman (yellow card) 61'; Doucouré (yellow card) 71'	Report	Nørgaard (yellow card) 45+1'	Stadium: Goodison Park; Attendance: 39,036; Referee: Simon Hooper

18 March 2023 28	Chelsea	2–2	Everton	Fulham
17:30 GMT	Félix 52'; Koulibaly (yellow card) 57'; James (yellow card) 74'; Havertz 76' (pen.)	Report	Gueye (yellow card) 29'; McNeil (yellow card) 45+1'; Doucouré 69'; Simms 89'	Stadium: Stamford Bridge; Attendance: 40,025; Referee: Darren England

3 April 2023 29	Everton	1–1	Tottenham Hotspur	Walton, Liverpool
20:00 BST	Doucouré (red card) 58'; Keane 90'	Report	Kane (yellow card) 60', (goal) 68' (pen.); Lenglet (yellow card) 64'; Romero (yellow card) 79'; Lucas (red card) 88'	Stadium: Goodison Park; Attendance: 39,294; Referee: David Coote

8 April 2023 30	Manchester United	2–0	Everton	Manchester
12:30 BST	McTominay 36'; Martial 71'	Report		Stadium: Old Trafford; Attendance: 73,509; Referee: Michael Oliver

15 April 2023 31	Everton	1–3	Fulham	Walton, Liverpool
15:00 BST	Gueye (yellow card) 27'; McNeil 35'; Gray (yellow card) 70'; Mykolenko (yellow card) 80'	Report	Reed 22'; Wilson 51'; James 68'; Adarabioyo (yellow card) 81'; Leno (yellow card) 90+6'	Stadium: Goodison Park; Attendance: 39,241; Referee: Anthony Taylor

22 April 2023 32	Crystal Palace	0–0	Everton	Selhurst
15:00 BST	Mitchell (yellow card) 27'	Report	Holgate (yellow card) 37' (yellow-red card) 80'; Calvert-Lewin (yellow card) 63'	Stadium: Selhurst Park; Attendance: 25,202; Referee: John Brooks

27 April 2023 33	Everton	1–4	Newcastle United	Walton, Liverpool
19:45 BST	Onana (yellow card) 40'; McNeil 80'; Maupay (yellow card) 90+5'	Report	Wilson 28', 75'; Targett (yellow card) 53'; Joelinton 72'; Murphy 81'	Stadium: Goodison Park; Attendance: 39,248; Referee: Andre Marriner

1 May 2023 34	Leicester City	2–2	Everton	Leicester
20:00 BST	Söyüncü 22'; Vardy 33'; Soumaré (yellow card) 44'; Maddison (penalty missed) 45+9', (yellow card) 89'; Thomas (yellow card) 53'; Kristiansen (yellow card) 90+2'	Report	Calvert-Lewin 15' (pen.); Iwobi 54'; Gueye (yellow card) 56'	Stadium: King Power Stadium; Attendance: 32,173; Referee: Michael Oliver

8 May 2023 35	Brighton & Hove Albion	1–5	Everton	Falmer
17:30 BST	Dunk (yellow card) 21'; Mac Allister 79'	Report	Doucouré 1', 29', (yellow card) 56'; Mina (yellow card) 18'; Gueye (yellow card) 25'; Steele 35' (o.g.); Calvert-Lewin (yellow card) 45+3'; McNeil 76', 90+6'; Onana (yellow card) 80'	Stadium: Falmer Stadium; Attendance: 31,567; Referee: Simon Hooper

14 May 2023 36	Everton	0–3	Manchester City	Walton, Liverpool
14:00 BST	Garner (yellow card) 49'	Report	Gündoğan 37', 51'; Haaland 39'	Stadium: Goodison Park; Attendance: 39,376; Referee: Anthony Taylor

20 May 2023 37	Wolverhampton Wanderers	1–1	Everton	Wolverhampton
15:00 BST	A. Traoré (yellow card) 17'; Hwang 34'; Dawson (yellow card) 45+5'; Semedo (yellow card) 51'; Neves (yellow card) 66'; Nunes (yellow card) 90+4'	Report	Garner (yellow card) 90'; Mina 90+9'	Stadium: Molineux; Attendance: 31,684; Referee: David Coote

28 May 2023 38	Everton	1–0	Bournemouth	Walton, Liverpool
16:30 BST	Doucouré 57'; Pickford (yellow card) 74'	Report	Senesi (yellow card) 68'; Smith (yellow card) 70'; Solanke (yellow card) 70'	Stadium: Goodison Park; Attendance: 39,395; Referee: Stuart Attwell

=== FA Cup ===
The Toffees entered the competition in the third round and were drawn away to Manchester United.

Win Draw Loss Fixtures

6 January 2023 Third round	Manchester United	3–1	Everton	Manchester
20:00 GMT	Antony 4'; Fernandes (yellow card) 28'; Coady 52' (o.g.); Rashford 90+7' (pen.)	Report	Coady 14'; Godfrey (yellow card) 61'; Doucouré (yellow card) 67'; Onana (yellow card) 88'	Stadium: Old Trafford; Attendance: 72,306; Referee: Darren England

=== EFL Cup ===
Everton entered the competition in the second round and were drawn away to Fleetwood Town.

Win Draw Loss Fixtures

23 August 2022 Second round	Fleetwood Town	0–1	Everton	Fleetwood
19:45 BST	Garner (yellow card) 34'; Andrew (yellow card) 44'; Baker (yellow card) 90+1'	Report	Gray 28'; Vinagre (yellow card) 49'	Stadium: Highbury Stadium; Attendance: 4,267; Referee: Tom Reeves

8 November 2022 Third round	Bournemouth	4–1	Everton	Kings Park, Bournemouth
19:45 GMT	Lowe 7'; Stanislas 47'; Anthony (yellow card) 73', (goal) 82'; Marcondes 78'; Pearson (yellow card) 84'; Stephens (yellow card) 85'	Report	Gordon (yellow card) 44'; Gray 67'; Mina (yellow card) 84'	Stadium: Vitality Stadium; Attendance: 10,021; Referee: Darren England

== Statistics ==
=== Appearances and goals ===
No.	Pos	Nat	Player	Total		Premier League		FA Cup		EFL Cup	
No.	Pos	Nat	Player	Apps	Goals	Apps	Goals	Apps	Goals	Apps	Goals
Goalkeepers
1	GK	(England) ENG	Jordan Pickford	38	0	37	0	1	0	0	0
15	GK	(Bosnia and Herzegovina) BIH	Asmir Begović	3	0	1	0	0	0	2	0
Defenders
2	DF	(England) ENG	James Tarkowski	40	1	38	1	1	0	0+1	0
3	DF	(Scotland) SCO	Nathan Patterson	21	0	14+5	0	0	0	2	0
4	DF	(England) ENG	Mason Holgate	9	0	5+3	0	0	0	1	0
5	DF	(England) ENG	Michael Keane	14	1	10+2	1	0	0	2	0
13	DF	(Colombia) COL	Yerry Mina	8	2	7	2	0	0	1	0
19	DF	(Ukraine) UKR	Vitaliy Mykolenko	35	0	30+4	0	1	0	0	0
22	DF	(England) ENG	Ben Godfrey	14	0	10+3	0	1	0	0	0
23	DF	(Republic of Ireland) IRL	Séamus Coleman	24	1	20+3	1	0	0	1	0
29	DF	(Portugal) POR	Rúben Vinagre	4	0	0+2	0	0	0	2	0
30	DF	(England) ENG	Conor Coady	25	2	23+1	1	1	1	0	0
64	DF	(England) ENG	Reece Welch	1	0	0	0	0	0	1	0
Midfielders
8	MF	(Belgium) BEL	Amadou Onana	35	1	29+4	1	1	0	1	0
16	MF	(Mali) MLI	Abdoulaye Doucouré	27	5	17+8	5	0+1	0	1	0
17	MF	(Nigeria) NGR	Alex Iwobi	41	2	38	2	1	0	1+1	0
26	MF	(England) ENG	Tom Davies	20	0	4+15	0	0	0	1	0
27	MF	(Senegal) SEN	Idrissa Gueye	34	0	32+1	0	1	0	0	0
37	MF	(England) ENG	James Garner	17	0	7+9	0	0	0	1	0
60	MF	(Northern Ireland) NIR	Isaac Price	1	0	0+1	0	0	0	0	0
Forwards
7	FW	(England) ENG	Dwight McNeil	39	7	28+8	7	0+1	0	1+1	0
9	FW	(England) ENG	Dominic Calvert-Lewin	18	2	15+2	2	0+1	0	0	0
11	FW	(Jamaica) JAM	Demarai Gray	36	6	27+6	4	1	0	1+1	2
20	FW	(France) FRA	Neal Maupay	28	1	9+17	1	1	0	1	0
50	FW	(England) ENG	Ellis Simms	11	1	2+9	1	0	0	0	0
56	FW	(England) ENG	Stanley Mills	1	0	0	0	0	0	0+1	0
Players transferred/loaned out during the season
10	FW	(England) ENG	Anthony Gordon	18	3	12+4	3	0+1	0	1	0
20	FW	(England) ENG	Dele Alli	2	0	0+2	0	0	0	0	0
33	FW	(Venezuela) VEN	Salomón Rondón	8	0	1+6	0	0	0	1	0
47	FW	(Republic of Ireland) IRL	Thomas Cannon	3	0	0+2	0	0	0	0+1	0
51	MF	(England) ENG	Lewis Warrington	1	0	0	0	0	0	0+1	0

Last updated: 29 May 2023
Source: Competitions

=== Goalscorers ===
As of match played 28 May 2023

Rank	Pos.	No.	Player	Premier League	FA Cup	EFL Cup	Total
1	FW	7	(England) Dwight McNeil	7	0	0	7
2	FW	11	(Jamaica) Demarai Gray	4	0	2	6
3	MF	16	(Mali) Abdoulaye Doucoure	5	0	0	5
5	FW	10	(England) Anthony Gordon	3	0	0	3
5	FW	9	(England) Dominic Calvert-Lewin	2	0	0	2
5	MF	17	(Nigeria) Alex Iwobi	2	0	0	2
5	DF	30	(England) Conor Coady	1	1	0	2
8	DF	2	(England) James Tarkowski	1	0	0	1
8	DF	5	(England) Michael Keane	1	0	0	1
8	MF	8	(Belgium) Amadou Onana	1	0	0	1
8	DF	13	(Colombia) Yerry Mina	2	0	0	2
8	FW	20	(France) Neal Maupay	1	0	0	1
8	DF	23	(Republic of Ireland) Seamus Coleman	1	0	0	1
8	FW	50	(England) Ellis Simms	1	0	0	1
Own goals				2	0	0	2
Total				34	1	2	37

Source: Match reports in Competitions

=== Assists ===
As of match played 14 May 2023.

Rank	Pos.	No.	Player	Premier League	FA Cup	EFL Cup	Total
1	FW	17	(Nigeria) Alex Iwobi	7	0	1	8
2	MF	7	(England) Dwight McNeil	3	0	0	3
3	MF	8	(Belgium) Amadou Onana	2	0	0	2
3	MF	16	(Mali) Abdoulaye Doucoure	2	0	0	2
3	FW	20	(France) Neal Maupay	1	0	1	2
3	GK	1	(England) Jordan Pickford	1	0	0	1
3	DF	2	(England) James Tarkowski	1	0	0	1
3	DF	5	(England) Michael Keane	1	0	0	1
3	FW	9	(England) Dominic Calvert-Lewin	1	0	0	1
3	FW	11	(Jamaica) Demarai Gray	1	0	0	1
3	DF	22	(England) Ben Godfrey	1	0	0	1
3	MF	27	(Senegal) Idrissa Gueye	1	0	0	1
3	DF	30	(England) Conor Coady	1	0	0	1
3	MF	37	(England) James Garner	1	0	0	1
Total				24	0	2	26

Source: Match reports in Competitions

=== Clean sheets ===
As of match played 28 May 2023.

Rank	Name	Premier League	FA Cup	EFL Cup	Total	Played Games
1	(England) Jordan Pickford	8	0	0	8	38
2	(Bosnia and Herzegovina) Asmir Begović	1	0	1	2	3
Total		9	0	1	10	41

Source: Match reports in Competitions

=== Disciplinary record ===
As of match played 8 April 2023.

Rank	Position	Name	Premier League		FA Cup		EFL Cup		Total	
Rank	Position	Name	Yellow card	Red card	Yellow card	Red card	Yellow card	Red card	Yellow card	Red card
1	MF	(Belgium) Amadou Onana	9	0	1	0	0	0	10	0
2	FW	(England) Anthony Gordon	6	0	0	0	1	0	7	0
2	MF	(Mali) Abdoulaye Doucoure	5	1	1	0	0	0	6	1
3	DF	(England) James Tarkowski	6	0	0	0	0	0	6	0
4	GK	(England) Jordan Pickford	5	0	0	0	0	0	5	0
4	FW	(England) Dwight McNeil	5	0	0	0	0	0	5	0
5	MF	(Senegal) Idrissa Gueye	4	0	0	0	0	0	4	0
6	DF	(Ukraine) Vitaliy Mykolenko	3	0	0	0	0	0	3	0
6	DF	(England) Nathan Patterson	3	0	0	0	0	0	3	0
6	FW	(France) Neal Maupay	3	0	0	0	0	0	3	0
6	FW	(England) Ben Godfrey	2	0	1	0	0	0	3	0
6	MF	(England) Tom Davies	3	0	0	0	0	0	3	0
7	FW	(Nigeria) Alex Iwobi	2	0	0	0	0	0	2	0
7	FW	(Jamaica) Demarai Gray	2	0	0	0	0	0	2	0
7	DF	(England) Conor Coady	2	0	0	0	0	0	2	0
7	DF	(Colombia) Yerry Mina	1	0	0	0	1	0	2	0
8	DF	(Republic of Ireland) Seamus Coleman	1	0	0	0	0	0	1	0
8	FW	(England) Dominic Calvert-Lewin	1	0	0	0	0	0	1	0
8	DF	(England) Mason Holgate	1	0	0	0	0	0	1	0
8	DF	(Portugal) Rúben Vinagre	0	0	0	0	1	0	1	0
8	MF	(England) James Garner	1	0	0	0	0	0	1	0
8	MF	(Northern Ireland) Isaac Price	1	0	0	0	0	0	1	0
Total			64	1	3	0	3	0	70	1

Source: Match reports in Competitions

== See also ==
- 2022–23 in English football
- List of Everton F.C. seasons
