= Andrew Wogan =

Irish footballer (born 2003)

Personal information
- Full name: Andrew Brian Wogan
- Date of birth: 1 December 2005 (age 20)
- Place of birth: Ardee, Ireland
- Height: 1.89 m (6 ft 2 in)
- Position: Goalkeeper

Team information
- Current team: Stockport County
- Number: 32

Youth career
- –2020: Ardee Celtic
- 2020–2023: Drogheda United

Senior career*
Years	Team	Apps	(Gls)
2023–2024	Drogheda United	35	(0)
2024–	Stockport County	0	(0)
2024	→ Drogheda United (loan)	2	(0)
2025	→ Marine (loan)	10	(0)
2025	→ Chester (loan)	4	(0)
2026	→ Boston United (loan)	6	(0)

International career^{‡}
2023–2024	Republic of Ireland U19	7	(0)
2025	Republic of Ireland U21	1	(0)
- * Club domestic league appearances and goals as of 20:50, 15 November 2026 (UTC) ‡ National team caps and goals as of 00:12, 18 November 2026 (UTC)

Andrew Brian Wogan (born 1 December 2005) is an Irish professional footballer who plays as a goalkeeper for EFL League One side Stockport County.

== Club career ==
=== Youth career ===
Born in Ardee, Wogan began his career with Ardee Celtic - leaving them in 2020 to join the academy setup at then League of Ireland First Division side Drogheda United.

=== Drogheda United ===
After progressing through the academy at Drogheda following his arrival in 2020 from Ardee Celtic, Wogan played for both the U17 and U19 sides in 2021 and 2022, he signed a new contract with the club on 12 July 2023. After impressing in various games in the youth setup, he was promoted to the first team by manager Kevin Doherty ahead of the 2023 season, he went onto feature in the Jim Malone Cup during pre-season and ended up making the winning penalty save in the shootout. Having been on the bench for nine games during the league campaign, Wogan made his professional debut for The Drogs on 5 June 2023; playing the full 90 minutes during a 3–2 away defeat against Shelbourne at Tolka Park. On 21 July 2023, Wogan made his cup bow for Drogheda during the FAI Cup First Round tie against Sligo Rovers; which resulted in a 2–1 win at Weavers Park. On 15 April 2024, Wogan signed his first professional contract with Drogheda, which came about after he impressed since breaking into the first team during the previous campaign.

=== Stockport County ===
On 8 July 2024, Wogan signed for EFL League One side Stockport County, in what Drogheda described as a "club record fee". However, as part of the transfer, he remained with Drogheda United on loan to complete the remainder of the season.

==== Marine loan ====
On 28 January 2025, after returning from his loan spell in Ireland; Wogan joined National League North side Marine on loan until the end of the season, and made his debut for the club later the same day during a 1–1 draw against Farsley Celtic. On 27 March 2025, after featuring ten times for Marine; Wogan was recalled by Stockport County - with Max Metcalfe moving in the opposite direction.

==== Chester loan ====
On 16 August 2025, Wigan signed for National League North side Chester on an emergency loan until the end of the month. He made 4 appearances during his short spell at the club.

==== Boston United loan ====
On 24 January 2026, Wogan was loaned out to National League side Boston United until the end of the season.

== International career ==
In June 2023, Wogan was called into the Republic of Ireland under-19's ahead of a training camp in Abbotstown, and three months later, he was named in Tom Mohan's U19 squad ahead of two back-to-back friendlies against Bosnia and Herzegovina under–19's in Trebinje. On 15 March 2024, after picking up several caps for the Under-19's, Wogan was named in the Republic of Ireland under-21's squad for the first time ahead of a 2025 UEFA European Under-21 Championship qualifying game against San Marino under-21's in Serravalle. On 10 June 2025, he made his debut for the U21s in a 0–0 draw with Qatar U23 in a friendly in Croatia.

== Career statistics ==
As of match played 21 February 2026

Appearances and goals by club, season and competition
Club	Season	League			National cup (Note: Includes FAI Cup & FA Cup)		League cup (Note: Includes EFL Cup & National League Cup)		Other		Total	
Club	Season	Division	Apps	Goals	Apps	Goals	Apps	Goals	Apps	Goals	Apps	Goals
Drogheda United	2023	LOI Premier Division	18	0	3	0	—		—		21	0
Drogheda United	2024	LOI Premier Division	17	0	—		—		2 (Note: Appearance(s) in the Leinster Senior Cup)	0	19	0
Drogheda United	Total		35	0	3	0	—		2	0	40	0
Stockport County	2024–25	League One	0	0	0	0	—		0	0	0	0
Stockport County	2025–26	League One	0	0	0	0	—		0	0	0	0
Stockport County	2026–27	League One	0	0	0	0	0	0	0	0	0	0
Stockport County	Total		0	0	0	0	0	0	0	0	0	0
Drogheda United (loan)	2024	LOI Premier Division	2	0	0	0	—		1	0	3	0
Marine (loan)	2024–25	National League North	10	0	—		—		—		10	0
Chester (loan)	2025–26	National League North	4	0	—		—		—		4	0
Boston United (loan)	2025–26	National League	6	0	—		1	0	—		7	0
Career total			57	0	3	0	1	0	3	0	64	0

== Honours ==
=== Individual ===
- Drogheda United Supporters Young Player of the Year: 2023
