= Tyler Onyango =

English footballer

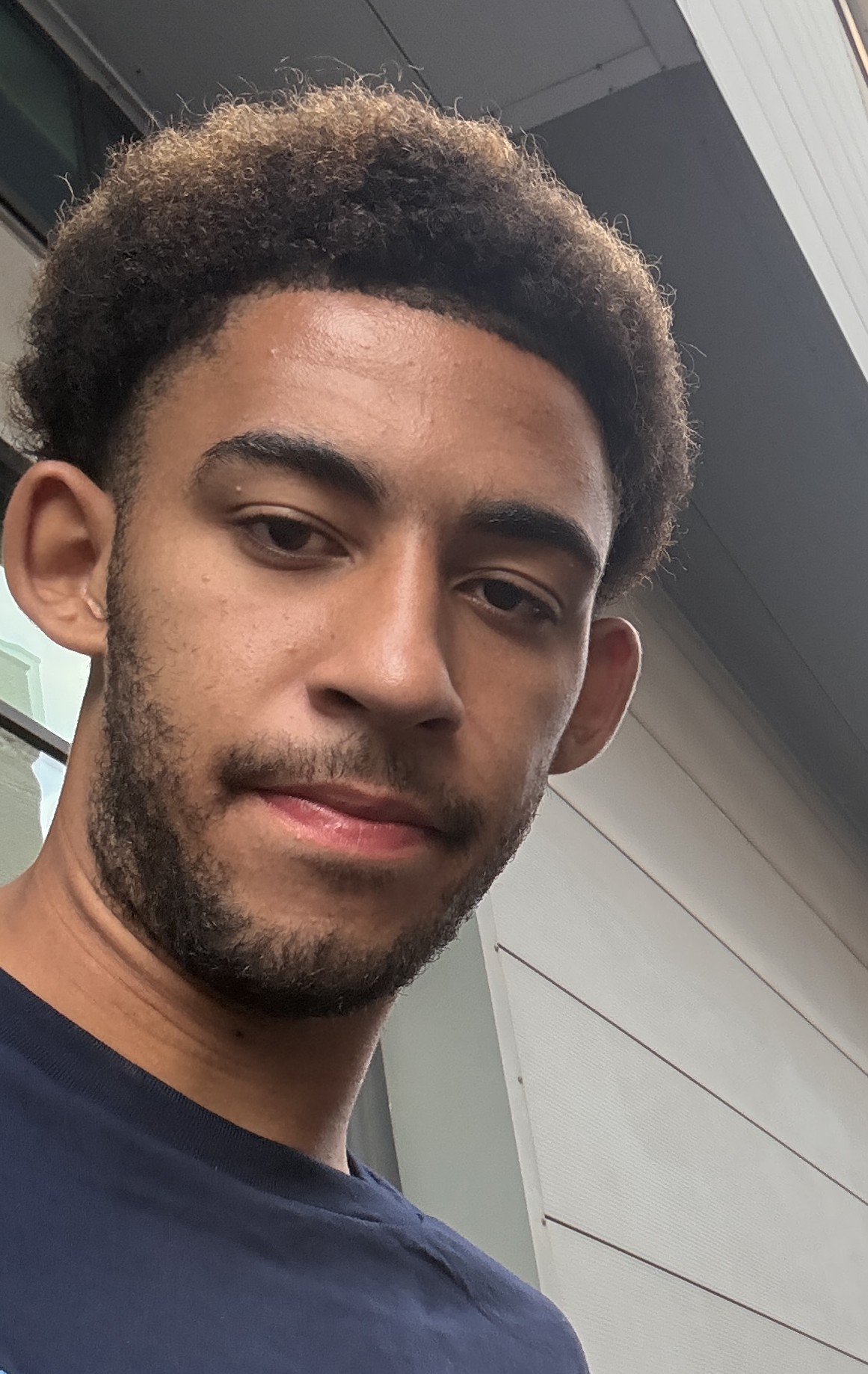
- Onyango in 2026

Personal information
- Full name: Tyler Jaden Napier Edward Onyango
- Date of birth: 4 March 2003 (age 23)
- Place of birth: Luton, England
- Height: 6 ft 5 in (1.96 m)
- Positions: Central midfielder; right wing-back

Team information
- Current team: Sheffield Wednesday
- Number: 21

Youth career
- 2011–2020: Everton

Senior career*
| Years | Team | Apps | (Gls) |
| 2020–2026 | Everton | 4 | (0) |
| 2022–2023 | → Burton Albion (loan) | 16 | (0) |
| 2023 | → Forest Green Rovers (loan) | 3 | (0) |
| 2024–2025 | → Stockport County (loan) | 7 | (0) |
| 2025–2026 | → Stockport County (loan) | 10 | (0) |
| 2026– | Sheffield Wednesday | 1 | (0) |

International career
| 2019 | England U17 | 5 | (0) |
- * Club domestic league appearances and goals as of 16:11, 15 August 2026 (UTC)

Tyler Jaden Napier Edward Onyango (born 4 March 2003) is an English professional footballer who plays as a central midfielder or right wing-back for EFL League One club Sheffield Wednesday.

== Career ==
=== Everton ===
On 24 January 2021, Onyango made his first-team debut for Everton when he came off of the bench to replace André Gomes in the 85th minute of an FA Cup fourth round victory over Sheffield Wednesday. On 21 November 2021, Onyango made his Premier League debut as a substitute in the final minute of a 3–0 defeat to Manchester City, going on to make a further two league appearances in the 2021–22 season as Everton narrowly avoided relegation.

On 27 July 2022, Onyango joined EFL League One club Burton Albion on a season-long loan deal. In January 2023, Onyango returned to Everton.

On 27 January 2023, Onyango returned to League One to join bottom club Forest Green Rovers on loan until the end of the season, the first signing for new manager, and former Everton youth coach, Duncan Ferguson. After just three appearances, a hamstring injury saw him forced to return to his parent club.

On 9 August 2024, Onyango signed a season-long loan deal to join Stockport County. Having sustained a hamstring injury in November 2024, he returned to his parent club in January 2025.

On 1 September 2025, Onyango returned to League One side Stockport County on a season-long loan deal.

On 9 June 2026, Everton announced that they were releasing Onyango at the expiration of his contract that summer.

=== Sheffield Wednesday ===
On 7 August 2026, Onyango signed a three-year contract with League One club Sheffield Wednesday following a successful trial. He made his debut on the opening day of the League One season, starting the game against Leyton Orient, however he picked up an early injury and would be replaced by Jarvis Thornton after 14 minutes. The following week, manager Henrik Pedersen confirmed that he had injured his ACL and could be out for the season.

== International career ==
Onyango was born in England to a Kenyan father and English mother. This makes him eligible to play for either Kenya or England National teams. He is a youth international for England at under-17 level.

== Career statistics ==
=== Club ===
As of 15 August 2026

Appearances and goals by club, season and competition
| Club | Season | League | | | FA Cup | | League Cup | | Other | | Total | |
| Club | Season | Division | Apps | Goals | Apps | Goals | Apps | Goals | Apps | Goals | Apps | Goals |
|---|---|---|---|---|---|---|---|---|---|---|---|---|
| Everton U23 | 2019–20 | – | | | | | | | 2 (Note: Appearances in the EFL Trophy) | 0 | 2 | 0 |
| Everton U23 | 2021–22 | — | | | | | | | 1 | 0 | 1 | 0 |
| Everton U23 | 2022–23 | — | | | | | | | 0 | 0 | 0 | 0 |
| Everton U23 | 2023–24 | — | | | | | | | 1 | 0 | 1 | 0 |
| Everton U23 | Total | | | | | | | | 4 | 0 | 4 | 0 |
| Everton | 2020–21 | Premier League | 0 | 0 | 1 | 0 | 0 | 0 | — | | 1 | 0 |
| Everton | 2021–22 | Premier League | 3 | 0 | 0 | 0 | 0 | 0 | — | | 3 | 0 |
| Everton | 2022–23 | Premier League | 0 | 0 | 0 | 0 | 0 | 0 | — | | 0 | 0 |
| Everton | 2023–24 | Premier League | 1 | 0 | 0 | 0 | 0 | 0 | — | | 1 | 0 |
| Everton | Total | | 4 | 0 | 1 | 0 | 0 | 0 | 0 | 0 | 5 | 0 |
| Burton Albion (loan) | 2022–23 | League One | 16 | 0 | 2 | 0 | 1 | 0 | 5 | 0 | 24 | 0 |
| Forest Green Rovers (loan) | 2022–23 | League One | 3 | 0 | 0 | 0 | 0 | 0 | — | | 3 | 0 |
| Stockport County (loan) | 2024–25 | League One | 7 | 0 | 1 | 0 | 1 | 0 | 1 | 0 | 10 | 0 |
| Stockport County (loan) | 2025–26 | League One | 10 | 0 | 1 | 0 | 0 | 0 | 2 | 0 | 13 | 0 |
| Sheffield Wednesday | 2026–27 | League One | 1 | 0 | 0 | 0 | 0 | 0 | — | | 1 | 0 |
| Career total | | | 41 | 0 | 5 | 0 | 2 | 0 | 12 | 0 | 60 | 0 |
