= 2024–25 Stockport County F.C. season =

143rd season in existence of Stockport County FC

Stockport County
2024–25 season
- Owner: Mark Stott
- Chairman: Ken Knott
- Manager: Dave Challinor
- Stadium: Edgeley Park
- League One: 3rd
- FA Cup: Third round
- EFL Cup: First round
- EFL Trophy: Round of 32
- Top goalscorer: League: Louie Barry (15); All: Louie Barry (16)
- Average home league attendance: 9,603
Home colours	Away colours	Third colours

The 2024–25 season was the 143rd season in the history of Stockport County Football Club and their first season back in League One since the 2009–10 season following their promotion from League Two in the previous season. In addition to the domestic league, the club also participated in the FA Cup, the EFL Cup, and the EFL Trophy.

== Transfers ==
=== In ===
Date	Pos.	Player	From	Fee	Ref.
14 June 2024 (Note: The transfer was announced on 3 June, and would become official on June 14 once the transfer window reopened)	RW	Jayden Fevrier (ENG)	Colchester United (ENG)	Undisclosed	
14 June 2024 (Note: The transfer was announced on 24 May, and would become official on June 14 once the transfer window reopened)	DM	Jay Mingi (ENG)	Colchester United (ENG)	Undisclosed	
27 June 2024	GK	Corey Addai (JAM)	Crawley Town (ENG)	Undisclosed	
1 July 2024 (Note: The transfer was announced on 20 June, and would become official on July 1 once his Leeds United contract expired)	CM	Lewis Bate (ENG)	Leeds United (ENG)	Free	
1 July 2024 (Note: The transfer was announced on 15 June, and would become official on July 1 once his Blackpool contract expired)	DM	Callum Connolly (ENG)	Blackpool (ENG)	Free	
1 July 2024 (Note: The transfer was announced on 14 June, and would become official on July 1 once his Sunderland contract expired)	LW	Jack Diamond (ENG)	Sunderland (ENG)	Free	
1 July 2024	CB	Sam Hughes (ENG)	Burton Albion (ENG)	Free	
1 July 2024 (Note: The transfer was announced on 26 June, and would become official on July 1 once his Mickleover contract expired)	CB	Ethan Mann (Note: Signed initially for the Emerging Talent Programme) (ENG)	Mickleover (ENG)	Free	
1 July 2024 (Note: The transfer was announced on 27 June, and would become official on July 1 once his Middlesbrough contract expired)	GK	Max Metcalfe (SCO)	Middlesbrough (ENG)	Free	
2 July 2024	CM	Lewis Fiorini (SCO)	Manchester City (ENG)	Undisclosed	
8 July 2024	GK	Andrew Wogan (IRL)	Drogheda United (IRL)	Undisclosed	
23 August 2024	CM	Oliver Norwood (NIR)	Sheffield United (ENG)	Free	
1 January 2025 (Note: The transfer was announced on 11 December, and would become official on January 1 once the transfer window reopened)	CF	Benoný Breki Andrésson (ISL)	KR (ISL)	Undisclosed	
3 February 2025	CM	Owen Moxon (ENG)	Portsmouth (ENG)	Undisclosed	
6 February 2025	LW	Arian Allen (MSR)	Rangers (SCO)	Free	

=== Out ===
Date	Pos.	Player	To	Fee	Ref.
14 June 2024 (Note: The transfer was announced on 20 May, and would become official on June 14 once the transfer window re-opened)	CB	Neill Byrne (IRL)	Bradford City (ENG)	Undisclosed	
8 July 2024	CB	Akil Wright (ENG)	Ross County (SCO)	Undisclosed	

=== Loaned in ===
Date	Pos.	Player	From	Date until	Ref.
16 July 2024	CF	Michael Mellon (SCO)	Burnley (ENG)	8 January 2025 (Note: On 8 January, Mellon was recalled back to Burnley)	
26 July 2024	LB	Tayo Adaramola (IRL)	Crystal Palace (ENG)	20 January 2025 (Note: On 20 January, Adaramola was recalled back to Crystal Palace)	
2 August 2024	CF	Louie Barry (ENG)	Aston Villa (ENG)	2 January 2025 (Note: On 22 December, it was announced that Barry was to be recalled back to Aston Villa on 2 January)	
9 August 2024	CM	Tyler Onyango (ENG)	Everton (ENG)	8 January 2025 (Note: On 8 January, Onyango was recalled back to Everton)	
23 January 2025	LW	Micah Hamilton (ENG)	Middlesbrough (ENG)	End of Season	
3 February 2025	CF	Sam Cosgrove (ENG)	Barnsley (ENG)	End of Season	
3 February 2025	CB	Brad Hills (ENG)	Norwich City (ENG)	End of Season	

=== Loaned out ===
Date	Pos.	Player	To	Date until	Ref.
4 July 2024	CM	Ashton Mee (ENG)	South Shields (ENG)	10 March 2025 (Note: On 10 March, Mee was recalled back from his loan at South Shields)	
8 July 2024	GK	Andrew Wogan (IRL)	Drogheda United (IRL)	30 November 2024	
9 July 2024	CB	Ethan Mann (ENG)	Buxton (ENG)	End of Season	
6 August 2024	CM	Cody Johnson (ENG)	King's Lynn Town (ENG)	End of Season (Note: On 3 January, Johnson's loan at King's Lynn was extended until the end of season)	
16 August 2024	RB	Jidechi Okeke (GER)	South Shields (ENG)	25 October 2024 (Note: On 25 October, Okeke was recalled back early from his loan at South Shields.)	
27 September 2024	CF	Jack Stretton (SCO)	Oldham Athletic (ENG)	25 October 2024 (Note: On 25 October, Stretton was recalled back early from his loan at Oldham.)	
31 October 2024	RB	Jid Okeke (GER)	Rochdale (ENG)	End of Season	
1 November 2024	CF	Jack Stretton (SCO)	Woking (ENG)	30 November 2024	
16 January 2025	CB	Sam Hughes (ENG)	Peterborough United (ENG)	End of Season	

=== Released / Out of Contract ===
Date	Pos.	Player	Subsequent club	Join date	Ref.
30 June 2024	DM	Ryan Croasdale (ENG)	Port Vale (ENG)	1 July 2024	
30 June 2024	LM	Myles Hippolyte (GRN)	AFC Wimbledon (ENG)	1 July 2024	
30 June 2024	GK	Bobby Jones (IRL)	Curzon Ashton (ENG)	1 July 2024	
30 June 2024	AM	Connor Lemonheigh-Evans (WAL)	Milton Keynes Dons (ENG)	1 July 2024	
30 June 2024	CF	Paddy Madden (IRL)	Chesterfield (ENG)	1 July 2024	
30 June 2024	CM	Antoni Sarcevic (ENG)	Bradford City (ENG)	1 July 2024	
30 June 2024	GK	Jordan Smith (ENG)	Hibernian (SCO)	18 July 2024	
30 June 2024	LB	Taylor McMahon (ENG)	Leek Town (ENG)	9 August 2024	
30 June 2024	RB	Todd Kane (ENG)	Ebbsfleet United (ENG)	30 September 2024	
3 February 2025	CF	Jack Stretton (SCO)	Burton Albion (ENG)	28 February 2025	

== Pre-season and friendlies ==
On 2 May, Stockport announced they would return to San Pedro del Pinatar for a five day warm-weather training camp. A week later, Derby County were confirmed as the opponents in Spain. A further four pre-season matches were added to the schedule, against Chester, Oldham Athletic, Blackburn Rovers and Carlisle United. A sixth was added on May 24, versus Barrow. In the June, a final pre-season match was confirmed, home to Stoke City.

Win Draw Loss Fixtures

6 July 2024 Friendly	Chester	2–3	Stockport County	Chester
13:00 BST	Caton 57'; Williams 81'	Report	Gardner 27'; Wootton 39'; Bate 43'	Stadium: Deva Stadium; Attendance: 1,265

13 July 2024 Friendly	Oldham Athletic	1–0	Stockport County	Oldham
15:00 BST	Kitching 1'	Report		Stadium: Boundary Park; Attendance: 2,197

19 July 2024 Friendly	Stockport County	v	Derby County	San Pedro del Pinatar, Spain
11:00 CEST (10:00 BST)				Stadium: Pinatar Arena

23 July 2024 Friendly	Barrow	Cancelled	Stockport County	Barrow-in-Furness
19:30 BST				Stadium: Holker Street
Note: Fixture was cancelled due to a change in the club's training schedule.

27 July 2024 Friendly	Stockport County	1–0	Stoke City	Stockport
14:00 BST	Wootton 31'	Report		Stadium: Edgeley Park; Attendance: 4,159

2 August 2024 Friendly	Stockport County	v	Blackburn Rovers	Stockport
19:30 BST				Stadium: Edgeley Park

3 August 2024 Friendly	Carlisle United	2–1	Stockport County	Carlisle
15:00 BST	Adu-Adjei 26'; Armstrong 68'	Report	Wootton 49'	Stadium: Brunton Park; Attendance: 1,880

== Competitions ==
=== League One ===
==== League table ====
Pos	Team	Pld	W	D	L	GF	GA	GD	Pts	Promotion, qualification or relegation
1	Birmingham City (C, P)	46	34	9	3	84	31	+53	111	Promotion to EFL Championship
2	Wrexham (P)	46	27	11	8	67	34	+33	92	Promotion to EFL Championship
3	Stockport County	46	25	12	9	72	42	+30	87	Qualification for League One play-offs
4	Charlton Athletic (O, P)	46	25	10	11	67	43	+24	85	Qualification for League One play-offs
5	Wycombe Wanderers	46	24	12	10	70	45	+25	84	Qualification for League One play-offs

Source: EFL Official Website
Rules for classification: 1) Points; 2) Goal difference; 3) Number of goals scored; 4) Head-to-head results; 5) Wins; 6) Away goals; 7) Penalty points (sec 9.5); 8) 12-point sending off offences
(C) Champions; (O) Play-off winners; (P) Promoted

==== Results summary ====
Overall								Home						Away					
Pld	W	D	L	GF	GA	GD	Pts	W	D	L	GF	GA	GD	W	D	L	GF	GA	GD
46	25	12	9	72	42	+30	87	16	3	3	41	21	+20	9	9	6	31	21	+10

Last updated: 3 May 2025.
Source: Soccerway

==== Results by round ====
Round	1	2	3	4	6	7	8	9	10	12	13	14	5^{1}	11^{2}	15	16	17	18	19	20	21	22	23	24	25	27	28	29	30	31	26^{3}	32	33	34	35	36	37	38	39	40	41	42	43	44	45	46
Ground	H	A	H	A	A	H	A	A	H	A	H	A	H	H	H	H	A	A	H	A	H	A	A	H	H	A	H	H	A	H	A	A	A	H	A	H	A	A	H	H	A	H	A	H	H	A
Result	W	W	W	D	D	L	D	W	D	D	D	L	W	L	W	W	W	L	W	L	W	L	D	D	L	W	W	W	W	W	D	W	L	W	D	D	W	L	W	W	W	W	D	W	W	W
Position	2	1	1	1	5	7	9	5	6	10	9	12	10	10	6	4	3	5	5	5	5	5	5	7	7	6	5	5	5	4	4	4	4	4	4	4	5	5	5	4	4	4	5	5	3	3
Points	3	6	9	10	11	11	12	15	16	17	18	18	21	21	24	27	30	30	33	33	36	36	37	38	38	41	44	47	50	53	54	57	57	60	61	62	65	65	68	71	74	77	78	81	84	87

Source: EFL
A = Away; H = Home; W = Win; D = Draw; L = Loss; P = Postponed
Notes:
- ^{1} Matchday 5 (vs. Reading) was postponed due to international call-ups.
- ^{2} Matchday 11 (vs. Wycombe Wanderers) was postponed due to international call-ups.
- ^{3} Matchday 26 (vs. Bristol Rovers) was postponed due both sides FA Cup involvements.

==== Matches ====
The league fixtures were released on 26 June 2024.

Win Draw Loss Fixtures

10 August 2024 1	Stockport County	2–0	Cambridge United	Edgeley
17:30 BST	Barry 5'; Pye (yellow card) 25'; Touray (yellow card) 49'; Camps (yellow card) 67'; Horsfall (yellow card) 70'; Wootton 76'	Report	Kaikai (yellow card) 39'; Rossi (yellow card) 58'	Stadium: Edgeley Park; Attendance: 9,457; Referee: Seb Stockbridge

17 August 2024 2	Blackpool	0–3	Stockport County	Blackpool
15:00 BST	Husband (yellow card) 82'; Pennington (yellow card) 83'	Report	Collar (yellow card) 60'; Barry 67'; Fevrier 84'; Olaofe 90+4'	Stadium: Bloomfield Road; Attendance: 12,567; Referee: Simon Mather

24 August 2024 3	Stockport County	2–0	Bristol Rovers	Edgeley
12:30 BST	Barry 39'; Wootton 64'	Report	Mola (yellow card) 28'; Conteh (yellow card) 45+2'; Garrett (yellow card) 90+1'	Stadium: Edgeley Park; Attendance: 9,423; Referee: Paul Howard
Note: Fixture was initially scheduled for a 15:00 kick-off, but was moved for live Sky Sports broadcast.

31 August 2024 4	Mansfield Town	1–1	Stockport County	Mansfield
15:00 BST	Boateng 22'	Report	Wootton 37'; Camps (yellow card) 11'	Stadium: Field Mill; Attendance: 8,293; Referee: Scott Oldham

14 September 2024 6	Crawley Town	1–1	Stockport County	Crawley
15:00 BST	Anderson (yellow card) 14'; Williams (yellow card) 36'; Quitirna 68' (pen.)	Report	Barry 6'; Onyango (yellow card) 40'; Norwood (yellow card) 65'	Stadium: Broadfield Stadium; Referee: James Linington

21 September 2024 7	Stockport County	1–4	Leyton Orient	Edgeley
15:00 BST	Diamond 50', (yellow card) 69'	Report	Galbraith 12', 17'; O'Neill (yellow card) 21'; James (yellow card) 28'; Agyei 57'; Clare 81'	Stadium: Edgeley Park; Attendance: 9,473; Referee: Adam Herczeg

28 September 2024 8	Barnsley	1–1	Stockport County	Barnsley
19:45 BST	Phillips 4' (pen.); de Gevigney (yellow card) 18'; Connell (yellow card) 74'; Benson (yellow card) 85'	Report	Onyango (yellow card) 19'; Barry 90+1'	Stadium: Oakwell; Attendance: 14,882; Referee: Declan Bourne
Note: Fixture was initially scheduled for a 15:00 kick-off, but was moved for live Sky Sports broadcast.

1 October 2024 9	Shrewsbury Town	0–2	Stockport County	Shrewsbury
19:45 GMT	Feeney (yellow card) 45+4'; Castledine (yellow card) 66'	Report	Pye 44', (yellow card) 48'; Horsfall (yellow card) 62'; Adaramola (yellow card) 64'; Bate (yellow card) 74'; Camps (yellow card) 78'; Connolly (yellow card) 82'; Wootton 86'	Stadium: New Meadow; Attendance: 5,600; Referee: Daniel Middleton

5 October 2024 10	Stockport County	0–0	Wigan Athletic	Edgeley
15:00 BST	Barry (yellow card) 37'; Pye (yellow card) 59'; Camps (yellow card) 65'	Report	Carragher (yellow card) 14'; Aimson (yellow card) 76'; Smith (yellow card) 90+3'	Stadium: Edgeley Park; Attendance: 9,995; Referee: Carl Brook

19 October 2024 12	Charlton Athletic	1–1	Stockport County	Charlton
15:00 BST	Anderson (yellow card) 61'; Edmonds-Green 66'	Report	Barry 12' (pen.); Norwood (yellow card) 58'; Horsfall (yellow card) 59' (yellow-red card) 87'; Pye (yellow card) 61'; Fiorini (yellow card) 90+2'; Touray (yellow card) 90+7'	Stadium: The Valley; Attendance: 13,711; Referee: Tom Reeves

22 October 2024 13	Stockport County	1–1	Northampton Town	Edgeley
19:45 BST	Barry 87' (pen.); Bate (yellow card) 90'	Report	Odimayo (yellow card) 54'; Fox (yellow card) 56'; Chouchane (yellow card) 64'; McGeehan (yellow card) 86'; Magloire 90+3'	Stadium: Edgeley Park; Attendance: 8,585; Referee: Jacob Miles

26 October 2024 14	Lincoln City	2–1	Stockport County	Lincoln
15:00 BST	House 42'; Cadamarteri 66'; Jefferies (yellow card) 70'	Report	Olaofe 9'	Stadium: LNER Stadium; Attendance: 9,513; Referee: Ben Speedie

29 October 2024 5	Stockport County	4–1	Reading	Edgeley
19:45 BST	Collar 18'; Wootton 33'; Barry 42' (pen.), 68'; Touray (yellow card) 53'	Report	Campbell 30'; Wing (yellow card) 74'	Stadium: Edgeley Park; Attendance: 8,128; Referee: Thomas Parsons
Note: Fixture was originally scheduled for September 7, but was postponed due to international call-ups for the opposition.

5 November 2024 11	Stockport County	0–5	Wycombe Wanderers	Edgeley
19:45 GMT	Horsfall (yellow card) 9'; Diamond (yellow card) 21'; Pye (yellow card) 47'	Report	Kone 10' (pen.), 18'; Onyedinma 11', 70'; Morley 77'	Stadium: Edgeley Park; Attendance: 8,305; Referee: Matthew Corlett
Note: Fixture was originally scheduled for 12 October, but was postponed due to international call-ups

9 November 2024 15	Stockport County	5–0	Bolton Wanderers	Edgeley
15:00 GMT	Collar 30', (yellow card) 67'; Wootton 47'; Horsfall 55'; Barry 62'; Bailey 89'	Report		Stadium: Edgeley Park; Attendance: 10,342; Referee: David Rock

16 November 2024 16	Stockport County	1–0	Wrexham	Edgeley
15:00 GMT	Barry 24'			Stadium: Edgeley Park

23 November 2024 17	Burton Albion	0–3	Stockport County	Burton upon Trent
15:00 GMT	Bennett (yellow card) 10'; Watt (yellow card) 24'; Armer (yellow card) 61'	Report	Bate 30'; Barry 42', 59'; Norwood (yellow card) 61'; Horsfall (yellow card) 63'; Wootton (yellow card) 64'	Stadium: Pirelli Stadium; Attendance: 3,564; Referee: Ben Atkinson

4 December 2024 18	Birmingham City	2–0	Stockport County	Bordesley
19:45 GMT	May 26', 35'; Stansfield (yellow card) 39'; Cochrane (yellow card) 50'; Anderson (yellow card) 61'; Allsop (yellow card) 74'	Report	Pye (yellow card) 48'; Touray (yellow card) 66'	Stadium: St Andrew's; Attendance: 24,863; Referee: Ben Toner
Note: Fixture was initially scheduled for 3 December, but was moved due to Birmingham playing the preceding Sunday.

7 December 2024 19	Stockport County	2–0	Exeter City	Edgeley
15:00 GMT	Mingi (yellow card) 49'; Crama 67' (o.g.); Hughes (yellow card) 82'; Barry 89'	Report	Harper (yellow card) 50'; Watts (yellow card) 60'; Woods (yellow card) 61'	Stadium: Edgeley Park; Referee: Scott Oldham

14 December 2024 20	Stevenage	2–1	Stockport County	Stevenage
15:00 GMT	Kemp 22'; Roberts (yellow card) 43'; Thompson (yellow card) 45'; Reid 55' (pen.); Butler (yellow card) 62'	Report	Camps 26', (yellow card) 40'; Bate (yellow card) 60'; Hinchliffe (yellow card) 67'	Stadium: Broadhall Way; Attendance: 3,513; Referee: Alex Chilowicz

20 December 2024 21	Stockport County	2–1	Peterborough United	Edgeley
19:45 GMT	Bailey 11', (yellow card) 58'; Bate (yellow card) 55'; Olaofe 75'; Wootton (yellow card) 90+6'	Report	Wallin (yellow card) 17'; Randall 34'; Kyprianou (yellow card) 44'; Mothersille (yellow card) 62'; Fernandez (yellow card) 76'	Stadium: Edgeley Park; Attendance: 9,745; Referee: Lewis Smith
Note: Fixture was initially scheduled for 21 December, but was moved in order an extra days recovery for both teams during the Christmas period.

26 December 2024 22	Huddersfield Town	1–0	Stockport County	Huddersfield
15:00 GMT	Bate 1' (o.g.); Lonwijk (yellow card) 57'	Report	Bailey (yellow card) 34'; Southam-Hales (yellow card) 56'	Stadium: Kirklees Stadium; Attendance: 21,657; Referee: Will Finnie

29 December 2024 23	Rotherham United	1–1	Stockport County	Rotherham
12:30 GMT	Odoffin 19', (yellow card) 39'; Jules (yellow card) 35'; Clarke-Harris (yellow card) 41'	Report	Barry 13'; Wootton (yellow card) 38'; Connolly (yellow card) 40'	Stadium: New York Stadium; Attendance: 10,194; Referee: Leigh Doughty
Note: Fixture was initially scheduled for a 15:00 kick-off, but was moved for live Sky Sports broadcast.

1 January 2025 24	Stockport County	1–1	Birmingham City	Edgeley
15:00 GMT	Southam-Hales 78', (yellow card) 90+1'; Fiorini (yellow card) 90+4'	Report	May 5'; Gardner-Hickman (yellow card) 34'	Stadium: Edgeley Park; Attendance: 10,528; Referee: Paul Howard

4 January 2025 25	Stockport County	1–2	Mansfield Town	Edgeley
15:00 GMT	Collar 20'	Report	Gregory 12', (penalty missed) 26', (yellow card) 74'; Evans 39'; Oshilaja (yellow card) 44'	Stadium: Edgeley Park; Attendance: 10,012; Referee: James Durkin

18 January 2025 27	Reading	1–3	Stockport County	Reading
15:00 GMT	Garcia (yellow card) 45+1'; Savage (yellow card) 48'; Smith 61', (yellow card) 88'	Report	Olaofe 5'; Connolly 13', (yellow card) 57'; Pye (yellow card) 45+1'; Diamond 68'	Stadium: Madejski Stadium; Attendance: 11,019; Referee: Carl Brook

25 January 2025 28	Stockport County	2–0	Crawley Town	Edgeley
15:00 GMT	Collar 25'; Southam-Hales 34'	Report	Radcliffe (yellow card) 49'; Ibrahim (yellow card) 51'; Adeyemo (yellow card) 80'	Stadium: Edgeley Park; Attendance: 8,960; Referee: Declan Bourne

28 January 2024 29	Stockport County	1–0	Shrewsbury Town	Edgeley
19:45 GMT	Norwood 37'; Touray (yellow card) 74'; Pye (yellow card) 87'	Report	Ojo (yellow card) 35'; Nsiala (yellow card) 90+2'	Stadium: Edgeley Park; Attendance: 8,862; Referee: Edward Duckworth

1 February 2025 30	Leyton Orient	0–1	Stockport County	Leyton
15:00 GMT	Cooper (yellow card) 56'	Report	Wootton 14'; Olaofe (yellow card) 60'; Knoyle (yellow card) 90+1'	Stadium: Brisbane Road; Attendance: 8,485; Referee: Matthew Russell

8 February 2025 31	Stockport County	2–1	Barnsley	Edgeley
12:30 GMT	Olaofe 31'; Collar 35' (pen.)	Report	Keillor-Dunn 90'	Stadium: Edgeley Park; Attendance: 10,148; Referee: Jacob Miles
Note: Fixture was initially scheduled for a 15:00 kick-off, but was moved for live Sky Sports broadcasting.

11 February 2025 26	Bristol Rovers	1–1	Stockport County	Horfield
19:45 GMT	Hunt (yellow card) 14'; Martin (yellow card) 85'; Swinkels 90+1'	Report	Connolly (yellow card) 44'; Norwood (yellow card) 48'; Olaofe 53'	Stadium: Memorial Stadium; Attendance: 6,643; Referee: David Rock
Note: Fixture was initially scheduled for 11 January, but was rearranged due to both clubs involvements in the FA Cup.

15 February 2025 32	Wigan Athletic	0–2	Stockport County	Wigan
15:00 GMT	Smith (yellow card) 29'	Report	Touray (yellow card) 60'; Bate 79'; Collar 82'; Hills (yellow card) 86'	Stadium: Brick Community Stadium; Attendance: 12,347; Referee: Darren Drysdale

22 February 2025 33	Cambridge United	2–0	Stockport County	Cambridge
15:00 GMT	Stokes 9', 43'; Digby (yellow card) 84'	Report	Connolly (red card) 49'	Stadium: Abbey Stadium; Attendance: 6,905; Referee: Scott Oldham

1 March 2025 34	Stockport County	2–1	Blackpool	Edgeley
15:00 GMT	Knoyle (yellow card) 14'; Touray (yellow card) 17'; Andrésson 47', 81'; Bate (yellow card) 84'	Report	Fletcher 7'; Evans (yellow card) 16'; Coulson (yellow card) 59'	Stadium: Edgeley Park; Attendance: 10,554; Referee: Stephen Martin

4 March 2025 35	Northampton Town	1–1	Stockport County	Sixfields
19:45 GMT	Taylor 31', (yellow card) 49'; Hoskins (yellow card) 38'; Dyche (yellow card) 43'	Report	Hills (yellow card) 66'; Andrésson 79'	Stadium: Sixfields Stadium; Attendance: 5,559; Referee: Lee Swabey

8 March 2025 36	Stockport County	0–0	Charlton Athletic	Edgeley
12:30 GMT		Report	Edwards (yellow card) 82'	Stadium: Edgeley Park; Attendance: 10,338; Referee: Martin Coy
Note: Fixture was initially scheduled for a 15:00 kick-off, but was moved for live Sky Sports broadcasting.

15 March 2025 37	Bolton Wanderers	0–1	Stockport County	Horwich
12:30 GMT	McAtee (yellow card) 45'; Matete (yellow card) 90+2'	Report	Knoyle (yellow card) 6'; Camps (yellow card) 60'; Bate (yellow card) 63'; Olaofe 72'; Moxon (yellow card) 84'	Stadium: Toughsheet Community Stadium; Attendance: 24,571; Referee: Ben Toner
Note: Fixture was initially scheduled for a 15:00 kick-off, but was moved for live Sky Sports broadcasting.

22 March 2025 38	Wrexham	1–0	Stockport County	Wrexham
15:00 GMT	Dobson (yellow card) 14'; Rodriguez (penalty missed) 29', 29'; McClean (yellow card) 31'; O'Connell (yellow card) 56'; Smith (yellow card) 81'; Fletcher (yellow card) 87'; Okonkwo (yellow card) 88'; Rathbone (yellow card) 90+5'	Report	Hills (yellow card) 24' (yellow-red card) 80'; Knoyle (yellow card) 90'	Stadium: Racecourse Ground; Attendance: 13,317; Referee: Simon Mather

29 March 2025 39	Stockport County	2–1	Burton Albion	Edgeley
12:30 GMT	Wootton 8'; Touray (yellow card) 24'; Fevrier (yellow card) 45+3'; Pye (yellow card) 53' (yellow-red card) 90+4'; Olaofe 76'	Report	McKiernan (yellow card) 27'; Lofthouse (yellow card) 45+2'; Sweeney (yellow card) 55'; Larsson 89'	Stadium: Edgeley Park; Attendance: 9,554; Referee: Elliot Bell
Note: Fixture was initially scheduled for a 15:00 kick-off, but was moved for live Sky Sports broadcasting.

1 April 2025 40	Stockport County	3–0	Stevenage	Edgeley
19:45 BST	Fevrier 25'; James-Wildin 50' (o.g.); Diamond 72'	Report		Stadium: Edgeley Park; Attendance: 8,427; Referee: Martin Woods

5 April 2025 41	Exeter City	0–2	Stockport County	Exeter
15:00 BST	Watts (yellow card) 24'; Purrington (yellow card) 26'; Niskane (yellow card) 51'	Report	Wootton 2', 22'; Olaofe (yellow card) 60'	Stadium: St James Park; Attendance: 6,541; Referee: Benjamin Speedie

12 April 2025 42	Stockport County	3–1	Rotherham United	Edgeley
15:00 BST	Diamond 42'; Hills 60'; Wootton 73'	Report	Wilks 9'	Stadium: Edgeley Park; Attendance: 10,390; Referee: Lee Swabey

18 April 2025 43	Peterborough United	1–1	Stockport County	Peterborough
15:00 GMT	Jones 43'; Kyprianou (yellow card) 90+2'; Wallin (yellow card) 90+3'	Report	Hills (yellow card) 25'; Touray (yellow card) 83'; Diamond (yellow card) 87', (goal) 90+1'; Moxon (yellow card) 90+5'	Stadium: London Road Stadium; Attendance: 11,241; Referee: Charles Breakspear

21 April 2025 44	Stockport County	2–1	Huddersfied Town	Edgeley
15:00 BST	Horsfall 74'; Norwood (yellow card) 75', (goal) 87' (pen.)	Report	Koroma (yellow card) 57', (goal) 61'; Charles (yellow card) 72'; Pearson (yellow card) 86'; Kasumu (yellow card) 90'; Marshall (red card) 90+5'	Stadium: Edgeley Park; Attendance: 10,346; Referee: Alex Chilowicz

26 April 2025 45	Stockport County	3–2	Lincoln City	Edgeley
15:00 BST	Fevrier 48'; Collar 78'; Olaofe 81'	Report	House (yellow card) 14', (goal) 24'; Ring 43'; Erhahon (yellow card) 68'; McGrandles (yellow card) 81'	Stadium: Edgeley Park; Attendance: 9,717; Referee: Farai Hallam

==== Play-offs ====
Stockport County finished 3rd in the regular season, and were confirmed to play 6th place Leyton Orient away in the first leg and at home in the second leg.

10 May 2025 First leg	Leyton Orient	2–2	Stockport County	Leyton
12:30 BST	Kelman 30', 88' (pen.); Clare (yellow card) 52'; Williams (yellow card) 64'; Abdulai (yellow card) 70'	Report	Norwood 60' (pen.); Horsfall 65'	Stadium: Brisbane Road; Referee: Benjamin Speedie

14 May 2025 Second leg	Stockport County	1–1 (a.e.t.) (3–3 agg.) (1–4 p)	Leyton Orient	Edgeley
20:00 BST	Touray (yellow card) 26'; Olaofe 74'; Pye (yellow card) 90+4'	Report	O'Neill 3'; Donley (yellow card) 19'; Brown (yellow card) 54'; Beckles (yellow card) 58'; Abdulai (yellow card) 98'; Clare (yellow card) 113'	Stadium: Edgeley Park; Attendance: 10,592; Referee: James Bell
	Penalties
	Norwood (penalty scored); Diamond (penalty missed); Rydel (penalty missed)		(penalty scored) James; (penalty scored) Clare; (penalty scored) Abdulai; (penalty scored) Galbraith

=== FA Cup ===
Stockport County were drawn at home to Forest Green Rovers in the first round, Brackley Town in the second round and away to Crystal Palace in the third round.

Win Draw Loss Fixtures

2 November 2024 First round	Stockport County	2–1 (a.e.t.)	Forest Green Rovers	Edgeley
15:00 GMT	Horsfall 64'; Touray (yellow card) 87'; Wootton 97'	Report	Doidge 82'; McAllister (yellow card) 90+2'	Stadium: Edgeley Park; Attendance: 4,624; Referee: Scott Tallis

30 November 2024 Second round	Stockport County	3–1	Brackley Town	Edgeley
15:00 GMT	Collar 15'; Wootton 18'; Olaofe 86'	Report	Connolly 55' (o.g.)	Stadium: Edgeley Park; Attendance: 5,637; Referee: Simon Mather

12 January 2025 Third round	Crystal Palace	1–0	Stockport County	Selhurst
15:00 GMT	Eze 4'; Muñoz (yellow card) 90+4'	Report	Touray (yellow card) 60'; Knoyle (yellow card) 76'; Connolly (yellow card) 89'	Stadium: Selhurst Park; Referee: Stuart Attwell

=== EFL Cup ===
On 27 June, the draw for the first round was made, with Stockport being drawn at home against Blackburn Rovers.

Win Draw Loss Fixtures

13 August 2024 First round	Stockport County	1–6	Blackburn Rovers	Stockport
19:30 BST	Cina (yellow card) 47'; Mapengu 67'; Bailey (yellow card) 90+2'	Report	Szmodics 8', 25'; Weimann 22'; Ohashi 31'; Gueye 72'; Vale 88'	Stadium: Edgeley Park; Attendance: 5,790; Referee: Ross Joyce

=== EFL Trophy ===
In the group stage, Stockport were drawn into Northern Group A alongside Accrington Stanley, Tranmere Rovers and Everton U21. In the round of 32, Stockport were drawn at home to Bradford City.

==== Group stage ====
Pos	Div	Team	Pld	W	PW	PL	L	GF	GA	GD	Pts	Qualification
1	L1	Stockport County	3	2	0	0	1	8	4	+4	6	Advance to Round 2
2	L2	Tranmere Rovers	3	2	0	0	1	5	4	+1	6	Advance to Round 2
3	ACA	Everton U21	3	1	0	0	2	5	7	−2	3	
4	L2	Accrington Stanley	3	1	0	0	2	4	7	−3	3	

Source: EFL

Win Draw Loss Fixtures

3 September 2024 Group stage	Accrington Stanley	1–4	Stockport County	Accrington
19:45 BST	Hunter 7'; B. Woods (yellow card) 32'; J. Woods (yellow card) 53'	Report	Powell (yellow card) 23'; Stretton 33', 35'; Norwood (yellow card) 41'; Horsfall (yellow card) 47'; Camps 82'; Barry 90+1'	Stadium: Crown Ground; Attendance: 791; Referee: Scott Jackson

17 September 2024 Group stage	Stockport County	4–1	Everton U21	Edgeley
19:00 BST	Olaofe 30', 51'; Fevrier 33'; Powell 63'	Report	Samuels-Smith (yellow card) 15'; Foster (yellow card) 67'; Benjamin 83'	Stadium: Edgeley Park; Attendance: 1,299; Referee: Paul Marsden

12 November 2024 Group stage	Stockport County	0–2	Tranmere Rovers	Edgeley
19:00 GMT	Fiorini (yellow card) 90+1'	Report	Dennis 21'; Hawkes 39'; Finley (yellow card) 43'; Bradshaw (yellow card) 50'	Stadium: Edgeley Park; Attendance: 1,236; Referee: Jamie O'Connor

==== Knoutout stages ====
10 December 2024 Round of 32	Stockport County	2–3	Bradford City	Edgeley
19:00 GMT	Norwood 26'; Olaofe (yellow card) 28'; Bailey 33'; Adaramola (yellow card) 45+2'	Report	Kavanagh 13', 63'; Cook 15'; Shepherd (yellow card) 25'; Evans (yellow card) 60'	Stadium: Edgeley Park; Attendance: 1,433; Referee: Aaron Bannister

== Statistics ==
=== Appearances and goals ===
Players with no appearances are not included on the list
Italics indicate a loaned in player

No.	Pos	Nat	Player	Total		League One		FA Cup		EFL Cup		EFL Trophy		League One play-offs	
No.	Pos	Nat	Player	Apps	Goals	Apps	Goals	Apps	Goals	Apps	Goals	Apps	Goals	Apps	Goals
1	GK	(England) ENG	Ben Hinchliffe	23	0	18+1	0	1+0	0	1+0	0	2+0	0	0+0	0
2	DF	(England) ENG	Kyle Knoyle	25	0	15+8	0	1+0	0	0+0	0	0+0	0	0+1	0
3	MF	(The Gambia) GAM	Ibou Touray	50	0	38+5	0	2+1	0	1+0	0	0+1	0	2+0	0
4	MF	(England) ENG	Lewis Bate	36	2	28+4	2	0+1	0	0+0	0	1+1	0	0+1	0
5	DF	(England) ENG	Sam Hughes	13	0	3+5	0	1+0	0	1+0	0	2+1	0	0+0	0
6	DF	(England) ENG	Fraser Horsfall	36	4	26+3	2	2+0	1	0+0	0	3+0	0	2+0	1
7	FW	(England) ENG	Jack Diamond	40	5	16+17	5	1+1	0	0+0	0	4+0	0	0+1	0
8	MF	(Northern Ireland) NIR	Callum Camps	33	2	19+8	1	2+0	0	0+1	0	0+2	1	0+1	0
9	FW	(England) ENG	Isaac Olaofe	51	12	26+16	8	2+1	1	0+0	0	4+0	2	2+0	1
10	FW	(England) ENG	Jayden Fevrier	33	4	11+14	3	1+1	0	1+0	0	3+0	1	2+0	0
11	MF	(England) ENG	Nick Powell	9	1	3+4	0	0+0	0	0+0	0	2+0	1	0+0	0
12	DF	(Wales) WAL	Macauley Southam-Hales	20	2	14+3	2	2+1	0	0+0	0	0+0	0	0+0	0
14	MF	(England) ENG	Will Collar	46	9	36+4	8	2+0	1	0+0	0	0+2	0	2+0	0
15	DF	(England) ENG	Ethan Pye	49	1	42+0	1	2+0	0	0+0	0	3+0	0	2+0	0
16	MF	(England) ENG	Callum Connolly	43	1	29+9	1	2+0	0	0+0	0	1+1	0	0+1	0
17	MF	(England) ENG	Jay Mingi	14	0	8+3	0	0+1	0	0+0	0	2+0	0	0+0	0
18	MF	(Scotland) SCO	Lewis Fiorini	15	0	4+7	0	0+1	0	0+0	0	3+0	0	0+0	0
19	FW	(England) ENG	Kyle Wootton	52	13	39+7	11	2+1	2	0+0	0	0+1	0	2+0	0
21	MF	(England) ENG	Owen Moxon	19	0	7+10	0	0+0	0	0+0	0	0+0	0	2+0	0
22	FW	(Iceland) ISL	Benoný Breki Andrésson	13	4	2+9	4	0+1	0	0+0	0	0+0	0	0+1	0
23	DF	(England) ENG	Ryan Rydel	22	0	8+9	0	0+2	0	0+0	0	1+0	0	0+2	0
24	FW	(England) ENG	Sam Cosgrove	7	0	1+6	0	0+0	0	0+0	0	0+0	0	0+0	0
26	MF	(England) ENG	Oliver Norwood	49	5	32+10	3	2+1	0	0+0	0	2+0	1	2+0	1
27	MF	(England) ENG	Odin Bailey	40	3	8+22	2	3+0	0	1+0	0	4+0	1	0+2	0
28	FW	(England) ENG	Micah Hamilton	5	0	0+5	0	0+0	0	0+0	0	0+0	0	0+0	0
29	DF	(Germany) GER	Jidechi Okeke	1	0	0+0	0	0+0	0	1+0	0	0+0	0	0+0	0
31	MF	(England) ENG	Che Gardner	4	0	0+1	0	0+0	0	1+0	0	1+1	0	0+0	0
33	DF	(England) ENG	Brad Hills	18	1	15+1	1	0+0	0	0+0	0	0+0	0	2+0	0
34	GK	(Jamaica) JAM	Corey Addai	35	0	28+1	0	2+0	0	0+0	0	2+0	0	2+0	0
40	MF	(England) ENG	Bruno Cina	1	0	0+0	0	0+0	0	0+1	0	0+0	0	0+0	0
44	DF	(England) ENG	John Williams-Lawless	1	0	0+0	0	0+0	0	0+1	0	0+0	0	0+0	0
45	DF	(England) ENG	Jake Lewis	1	0	0+0	0	0+0	0	0+1	0	0+0	0	0+0	0
46	DF	(England) ENG	Nathaniel Mapengu	1	1	0+0	0	0+0	0	1+0	1	0+0	0	0+0	0
54	MF	(England) ENG	Freddie Redshaw	1	0	0+0	0	0+0	0	1+0	0	0+0	0	0+0	0
55	MF	(England) ENG	Rhys Watson	1	0	0+0	0	0+0	0	0+1	0	0+0	0	0+0	0
56	MF	(England) ENG	Lee Williams	1	0	0+0	0	0+0	0	1+0	0	0+0	0	0+0	0
Player(s) who featured whilst on loan but returned to parent club during the season:
20	FW	(England) ENG	Louie Barry	24	16	22+1	15	0+0	0	0+0	0	0+1	1	0+0	0
22	FW	(Scotland) SCO	Michael Mellon	4	0	0+2	0	1+0	0	0+0	0	0+1	0	0+0	0
24	MF	(England) ENG	Tyler Onyango	10	0	4+3	0	1+0	0	1+0	0	1+0	0	0+0	0
33	DF	(Republic of Ireland) IRL	Tayo Adaramola	10	0	3+3	0	1+1	0	0+0	0	2+0	0	0+0	0
Player(s) who featured but departed the club permanently during the season:
21	FW	(Scotland) SCO	Jack Stretton	3	2	0+2	0	0+0	0	0+0	0	1+0	2	0+0	0
