= Callum Connolly =

English footballer (born 1997)

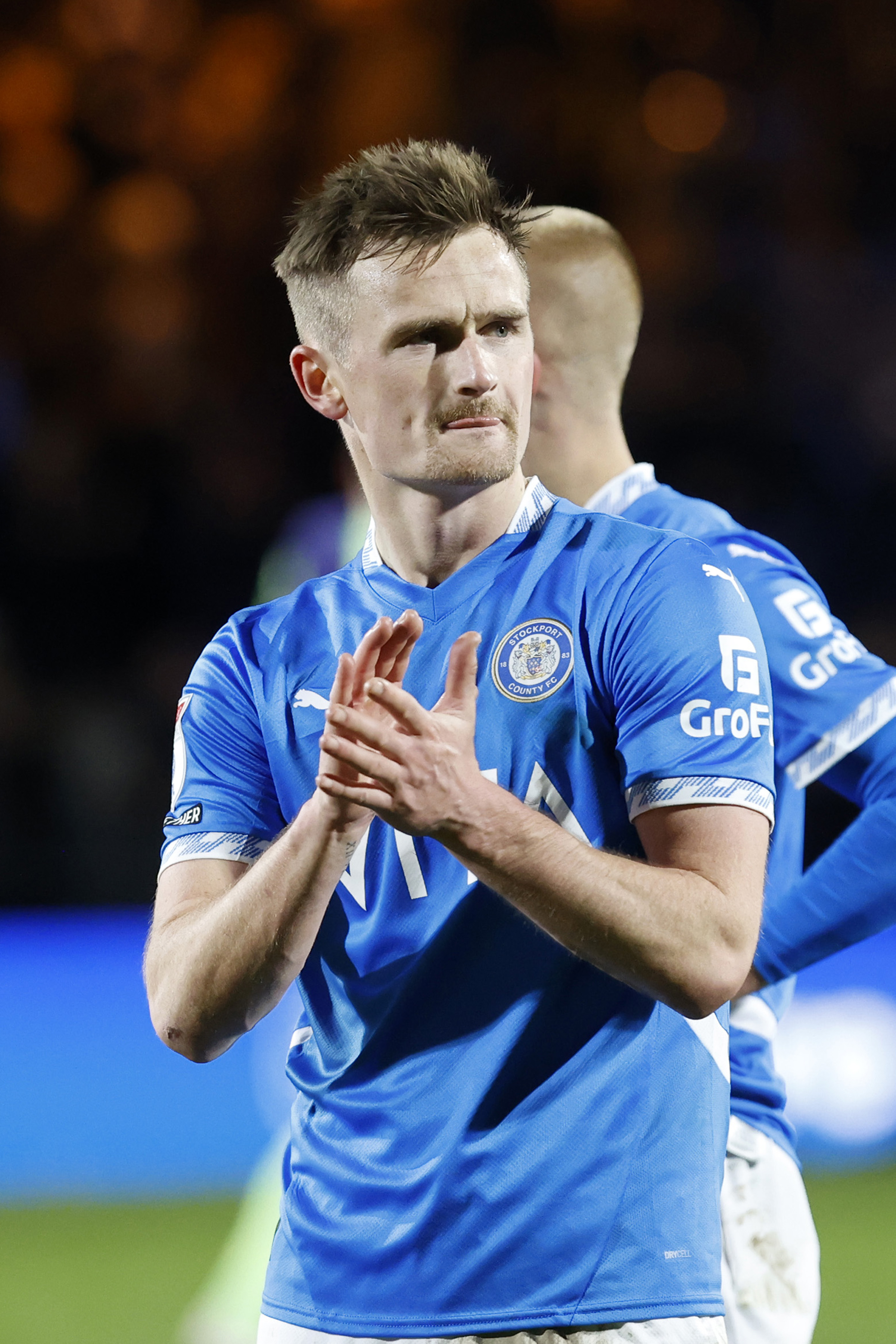
- Connolly in the 2024–25 season

Personal information
- Full name: Callum Alexander Connolly
- Date of birth: 23 September 1997 (age 29)
- Place of birth: Liverpool, England
- Height: 6 ft 1 in (1.85 m)
- Position: Defender

Team information
- Current team: Bradford City
- Number: 6

Youth career
- 2006–2016: Everton

Senior career*
Years	Team	Apps	(Gls)
2016–2021	Everton	1	(0)
2016	→ Barnsley (loan)	3	(0)
2017	→ Wigan Athletic (loan)	17	(2)
2017–2018	→ Ipswich Town (loan)	34	(4)
2018–2019	→ Wigan Athletic (loan)	17	(1)
2019	→ Bolton Wanderers (loan)	16	(2)
2019–2020	→ Lincoln City (loan)	11	(0)
2020	→ Fleetwood Town (loan)	13	(2)
2020–2021	→ Fleetwood Town (loan)	40	(2)
2021–2024	Blackpool	93	(3)
2024–2026	Stockport County	53	(2)
2026–	Bradford City	9	(0)

International career^{‡}
2014	England U17	4	(0)
2014–2015	England U18	9	(3)
2015–2016	England U19	10	(0)
2016–2017	England U20	7	(1)
2018	England U21	4	(1)
- * Club domestic league appearances and goals as of 11 October 2026 (UTC) ‡ National team caps and goals as of 09:49, 14 July 2018 (UTC)

Callum Alexander Connolly (born 23 September 1997) is an English professional footballer who plays as a defender or midfielder for EFL League One side Bradford City.

He has previously played for Everton, Barnsley, Wigan Athletic, Ipswich Town, Bolton Wanderers, Lincoln City, Blackpool, Stockport County and Fleetwood Town.

A versatile player, Connolly can play across the back line of defence and in midfield.

== Career ==
=== Everton ===
After playing with Crosby Stuart, Connolly joined Everton at the age of nine. He has earned representation at England under-17 and under-18 level. On 3 March 2016, he joined League One side Barnsley on a one-month loan deal. He made his debut two days later, in a 3–1 win over Walsall at the Bescot Stadium.

Connolly made his first Everton teamsheet on 16 April 2016, when he was named as a substitute for the 1–1 draw with Southampton, coming on as a second-half substitute for injured right-back Seamus Coleman to make his Premier League debut.

On 14 January 2017, Connolly signed on loan for Wigan Athletic until the end of the season, and just hours later made his debut and scored both goals as Wigan beat Burton Albion 2–0.

For the 2017–2018 season, Connolly played on loan for Ipswich Town in the EFL Championship. Used largely in central midfield for the first time in his career, Connolly returned to Everton at the end of the season, having played an impressive 36 matches, scoring four goals.

At the beginning of the 2018–19 season Connolly re-joined Wigan Athletic on loan, initially for the whole of the season but on 31 January 2019 he was recalled by Everton and sent on loan for the second half of the season to Bolton Wanderers

On 29 August 2019, Connolly headed out on loan once more, this time joining League One side Lincoln City on a season-long deal, but he returned to Everton early, after his loan spell was cut short in January.

Connolly signed with Fleetwood Town on 6 January 2020 on a loan deal for the rest of the 2019–20 season.

At the end of the 2020–21 it was announced that Connolly would leave the club at the end of his contract.

=== Blackpool ===
Connolly signed for Blackpool in July 2021 after becoming a free agent.

On 7 May 2024, the club announced he would be leaving the club in the summer once his contract expired.

=== Stockport County ===
On 15 June 2024, Connolly agreed to join newly-promoted League One side Stockport County on a two-year deal on 1 July 2024 after the expiry of his contract at Blackpool.

On 27 May 2026, the club announced he was being released.

=== Bradford City ===
On 29 June 2026, it was announced that Connolly had joined Bradford City on a two-year deal.

== International career ==
Connolly received his first international call up when he was named in the England under-17 squad for the 2014 Algarve Tournament. Connolly made his debut against eventual winners Germany in the final group stage game, with England finishing runners-up in the tournament. 10 days later, he was named in the squad for the elite round of qualification for the 2014 UEFA European Under-17 Championship, and helped England qualify by starting the wins against Czech Republic and Italy. Connolly was not named in the squad for the final tournament, which England went on to win after beating the Netherlands on penalties in the final.

Connolly was part of the England squad for the 2016 UEFA European Under-19 Championship, and started the first game, a 2–1 win against France. However, he sustained an injury in the second half of the match, and withdrew from the squad six days later. After also beating the Netherlands and Croatia to top the group, England were eventually eliminated in the semi-finals against Italy.

Connolly was selected for the England under-20 team in the 2017 FIFA U-20 World Cup. He played in the opening match against Argentina and the second against Guinea, but was unused as a substitute in the final that England won, their first win in a global tournament since their World Cup victory of 1966.

Connolly played in four of the five matches as the England under-21 team won the 2018 Toulon Tournament, including scoring against Scotland in the semi-final.

== Career statistics ==
As of match played 6 September 2025

Appearances and goals by club, season and competition
Club	Season	League			FA Cup		EFL Cup		Other		Total	
Club	Season	Division	Apps	Goals	Apps	Goals	Apps	Goals	Apps	Goals	Apps	Goals
Everton	2015–16	Premier League	1	0	0	0	0	0	—		1	0
Everton	2016–17	Premier League	0	0	0	0	0	0	—		0	0
Everton	2017–18	Premier League	0	0	0	0	0	0	0	0	0	0
Everton	2018–19	Premier League	0	0	0	0	0	0	—		0	0
Everton	2019–20	Premier League	0	0	0	0	0	0	—		0	0
Everton	2020–21	Premier League	0	0	0	0	0	0	—		0	0
Everton	Total		1	0	0	0	0	0	0	0	1	0
Everton U21	2017–18	—			—		—		1 (Note: Appearance(s) in EFL Trophy)	0	1	0
Barnsley (loan)	2015–16	League One	3	0	0	0	0	0	0	0	3	0
Wigan Athletic (loan)	2016–17	Championship	17	2	1	0	0	0	—		18	2
Ipswich Town (loan)	2017–18	Championship	34	4	1	0	0	0	—		35	1
Wigan Athletic (loan)	2018–19	Championship	17	1	1	0	1	0	—		19	1
Bolton Wanderers (loan)	2018–19	Championship	16	2	0	0	0	0	—		16	2
Lincoln City (loan)	2019–20	League One	11	0	1	0	0	0	3	0	15	0
Fleetwood Town (loan)	2019–20	League One	13	2	0	0	0	0	2 (Note: Appearance(s) in EFL League One play-offs)	0	15	2
Fleetwood Town (loan)	2020–21	League One	40	2	1	0	0	0	1	0	42	2
Blackpool	2021–22	Championship	31	2	1	0	1	1	—		33	3
Blackpool	2022–23	Championship	41	1	1	0	1	0	—		43	1
Blackpool	2023–24	League One	21	0	4	0	2	0	5	0	32	0
Blackpool	Total		93	3	6	0	4	1	5	0	108	4
Stockport County	2024–25	League One	38	1	2	0	0	0	3 (Note: Two appearances in EFL Trophy, One appearance in EFL League One play-offs)	0	43	1
Stockport County	2025–26	League One	7	0	0	0	1	0	0	0	8	0
Stockport County	Total		45	1	2	0	1	0	3	0	51	1
Career total			290	17	13	0	6	1	15	0	324	18

== Honours ==
England U20

- FIFA U-20 World Cup: 2017

England U21

- Toulon Tournament: 2018
