= 2018–19 Premier League Cup =

Tournament details
- Country: England; Wales
- Teams: 36

Final positions
- Champions: Everton (1st Title)
- Runners-up: Newcastle United (1st Runner Up Finish)

Tournament statistics
- Matches played: 115
- Goals scored: 382 (3.32 per match)
- Top goal scorer: (England) Ryan Edmondson Leeds United (8 Goals)

The 2018–19 Premier League Cup was the sixth edition of the competition. The defending champions were Aston Villa, who won the 2017–18 competition.

== Participants ==
36 teams participated in the competition this year, the same as last year. Bury, Dagenham & Redbridge did not return after participating last year, meanwhile Ipswich Town did not return after 4 years in the competition, Barnsley, Brighton & Hove Albion, Cardiff City, Middlesbrough, Watford, and Wigan Athletic did not return after 5 seasons in the competition. 7 teams returned to the competition this year. Notts County returned after competing in the inaugural competition, Doncaster Rovers, Leeds United, Peterborough United and Plymouth Argyle returned after a 2 year absence competing for the first time since 2015-2016, Fulham and Reading after last year's absence. Newport County and Oxford United participated in the competition for the very first time this year.

=== Category 1 ===
- Aston Villa
- Blackburn Rovers
- Derby County
- Everton
- Fulham
- Leicester City
- Liverpool
- Newcastle United
- Norwich City
- Reading
- Southampton
- Stoke City
- Sunderland
- Swansea City
- West Bromwich Albion
- Wolverhampton Wanderers

=== Category 2 ===
- Birmingham City
- Bristol City
- Burnley
- Charlton Athletic
- Colchester United
- Hull City
- Leeds United
- Nottingham Forest
- Sheffield United

=== Category 3 ===
- AFC Bournemouth
- Bristol Rovers
- Doncaster Rovers
- Exeter City
- Newport County
- Notts County
- Oxford United
- Peterborough United
- Plymouth Argyle
- Portsmouth
- Southend United

== Qualifying round ==
A qualifying round was required to finalise the 32 teams that would enter the Group Stage.

29 August 2018	Notts County	6–0	Newport County	Ilkeston
145:00	Campbell 45', 50', 60', 70'; Alessandra 5', 80'	Report 1 Report 2		Stadium: New Manor Ground

29 August 2018	Southend United	1–2	Oxford United	Southend-on-Sea
19:00	Wabo 80'	Report	Noel-Williams 44' (pen.); Lopes 78'	Stadium: Roots Hall

30 August 2018	Bristol Rovers	0–1	Exeter City	Bristol
19:00		Report	Seymour 32'	Stadium: Memorial Stadium

4 September 2018	Plymouth Argyle	2–1	Portsmouth	Plymouth
19:00	Battle 6'; Sangster 75'	Report 1 Report 2	Mnoga 51'	Stadium: Home Park; Attendance: 366; Referee: Steve Annis

== Group stage ==
Teams play each other twice, with the group winners and runners–up advance to the round of 16.

=== Group A ===
Team	Pld	W	D	L	GF	GA	GD	Pts
Stoke City	6	4	1	1	17	8	+9	13
Sunderland	6	4	0	2	18	13	+5	12
Peterborough United	6	2	0	4	11	18	−7	6
Charlton Athletic	6	1	1	4	6	13	−7	4

Updated to match(es) played on 25 February 2019. Source:

8 October 2018	Sunderland	2–0	Charlton Athletic	Hetton-le-Hole
19:00	Kokolo 36'; Diamond 56'			Stadium: Eppleton Colliery Welfare Ground; Attendance: 145

15 October 2018	Stoke City	3–2	Peterborough United	Leek
19:00	Campbell 32', 45' (pen.), 64'		Stevens 37', 67'	Stadium: Harrison Park

8 November 2018	Charlton Athletic	0–0	Stoke City	Eltham
13:00				Stadium: DGS Marine Stadium

19 November 2018	Peterborough United	1–4	Sunderland	Peterborough
19:00	Dembele 23'		Kokolo 9', 81'; Connelly 56'; Bainbridge 63'	Stadium: London Road Stadium

21 January 2019	Peterborough United	2–1	Stoke City	Peterborough
14:00	Stevens 4'; Godden 17'	Report	Dunwoody	Stadium: London Road Stadium

21 January 2019	Charlton Athletic	1–3	Sunderland	Eltham
19:00	Aouachria 6'		Connelly 55', 61', 64'	Stadium: DGS Marine Stadium

28 January 2019	Stoke City	6–2	Sunderland	Stoke-on-Trent
19:00	Berahino 11', 73'; Diouf 20', 44', 87', 89'		Connelly 42'; Mbunga Kimpioka 63'	Stadium: Clayton Wood Training Ground

7 February 2019	Peterborough United	0–3	Charlton Athletic	Peterborough
14:00			Kennedy 40', 86'; Dempsey 45'	Stadium: London Road Stadium

11 February 2019	Stoke City	4–1	Charlton Athletic	Leek
19:00	Will Forrester 5'; Kyeremateng 16', 48'; Sørensen 69'		Stevenson 47'	Stadium: Harrison Park

11 February 2019	Sunderland	6–2	Peterborough United	Hetton-le-Hole
19:00	Diamond 4', 80', 90+2'; Connelly 28', 64'; Mbunga Kimpioka 52' (pen.)		Penfold 54'; Shackleton 85'	Stadium: Eppleton Colliery Welfare Ground; Attendance: 112

25 February 2019	Charlton Athletic	1–4	Peterborough United	Eltham
13:00	Vetokele 45'		Penfold 21', 48'; Reed 34'; Stevens 80'	Stadium: DGS Marine Stadium

25 February 2019	Sunderland	1–3	Stoke City	Hetton-le-Hole
19:00	Mbunga Kimpioka 72'		Dunwoody 15'; Kyeremateng 35'; Verlinden 90'	Stadium: Eppleton Colliery Welfare Ground

=== Group B ===
Team	Pld	W	D	L	GF	GA	GD	Pts
Everton	6	4	2	0	11	5	+6	14
Blackburn Rovers	6	3	1	2	14	6	+8	10
Sheffield United	6	3	0	3	9	9	0	9
Doncaster Rovers	6	0	1	5	6	20	−14	1

Updated to match(es) played on 25 February 2019. Source:

5 October 2018	Everton	3–0	Doncaster Rovers	Southport
19:00	John 45'; Broadhead 88'; Markelo 90+1'			Stadium: Haig Avenue

5 October 2018	Sheffield United	3–1	Blackburn Rovers	Stocksbridge
19:00	Hallam 20'; Greaves 25'; Oure 63'		Mols 75'	Stadium: Bracken Moor Ground

6 November 2018	Doncaster Rovers	1–3	Sheffield United	Doncaster
19:00	Crawford 38'		Hallam 26', 68', 85' (pen.)	Stadium: Keepmoat Stadium

9 November 2018	Blackburn Rovers	0–1	Everton	Leyland
19:00		Report	Simmonds 35'	Stadium: County Ground; Attendance: 231; Referee: Simon Mather

30 November 2018	Sheffield United	0–1	Everton	Stocksbridge
14:00			Evans 26'	Stadium: Bracken Moor Ground

3 December 2018	Blackburn Rovers	4–0	Doncaster Rovers	Leyland
19:00	Nuttall 18', 34' (pen.), 45', 56'			Stadium: County Ground; Attendance: 128

21 January 2019	Blackburn Rovers	3–0	Sheffield United	Leyland
19:00	Platt 14'; Butterworth 16' (pen.), 35'			Stadium: County Ground

21 January 2019	Doncaster Rovers	3–3	Everton	Doncaster
19:00	Sadlier 10'; May 25'; Gibbons 52'		Hornby 13', 68'; Foulds 61'	Stadium: Keepmoat Stadium

8 February 2019	Sheffield United	2–1	Doncaster Rovers	Stocksbridge
14:00	Bryan 2'; York 85'		Wright 30'	Stadium: Bracken Moor Ground

8 February 2019	Everton	1–1	Blackburn Rovers	Southport
19:00	Gordon 70'		Butterworth 46'	Stadium: Haig Avenue

24 February 2019	Everton	2–1	Sheffield United	Southport
14:00	Sambou 85'; Mampala 90+2'	Report	York 63'	Stadium: Haig Avenue; Attendance: 186

25 February 2019	Doncaster Rovers	1–5	Blackburn Rovers	Doncaster
19:00	Watters 45+2'		Butterworth 7'; Brereton 10', 72'; Nuttall 28', 81'	Stadium: Keepmoat Stadium

=== Group C ===
Team	Pld	W	D	L	GF	GA	GD	Pts
Burnley	6	2	3	1	9	12	−3	9
AFC Bournemouth	6	2	2	2	13	10	+3	8
Liverpool	6	1	4	1	5	4	+1	7
West Bromwich Albion	6	1	3	2	6	7	−1	6

Updated to match(es) played on 1 March 2019. Source:

6 October 2018	AFC Bournemouth	7–1	Burnley	Boscombe
13:00	Pugh 17', 63'; Dobre 19', 74'; Kilkenny 65'; Hamilton 87'; Cropper 90+1' (o.g.)		Agyei 68'	Stadium: Dean Court

7 October 2018	West Bromwich Albion	1–0	Liverpool	West Bromwich
12:30	Morton 40' (pen.)			Stadium: The Hawthorns

9 November 2018	AFC Bournemouth	2–1	West Bromwich Albion	Boscombe
19:00	Kilkenny 28'; Seaman 41'		Morton 10'	Stadium: Dean Court

11 November 2018	Liverpool	1–1	Burnley	Kirkby
13:00	McAuley 54'		Chakwana 52'	Stadium: Liverpool Academy

30 November 2018	West Bromwich Albion	2–2	Burnley	Hednesford
19:00	Harper 29'; Meredith 65'		Blair 24'; Agyei 76'	Stadium: Keys Park

2 December 2018	Liverpool	1–1	AFC Bournemouth	Kirkby
12:00	Camacho 58'		Taylor 80'	Stadium: Liverpool Academy

18 January 2019	Burnley	4–2	AFC Bournemouth	Ashton-under-Lyne
13:00	Blair 10', 66'; Harker 76'; Thomas 79'		Jordan 58'; Glennon 60' (o.g.)	Stadium: Tameside Stadium

20 January 2019	Liverpool	1–1	West Bromwich Albion	Kirkby
13:00	Edwards 22'		Virtue-Thick 60'	Stadium: Liverpool Academy

8 February 2019	Burnley	0–0	Liverpool	Bamber Bridge
14:00				Stadium: Sir Tom Finney Stadium

11 February 2019	West Bromwich Albion	1–1	AFC Bournemouth	Hednesford
19:00	Azaz 82'		Anthony 24'	Stadium: Keys Park

24 February 2019	AFC Bournemouth	0–2	Liverpool	Boscombe
13:00			McAuley 3'; Glatzel 81'	Stadium: Dean Court; Attendance: 1,830

1 March 2019	Burnley	1–0	West Bromwich Albion	Ashton-under-Lyne
14:00	Agyei 2'			Stadium: Tameside Stadium

=== Group D ===
Team	Pld	W	D	L	GF	GA	GD	Pts
Nottingham Forest	6	5	1	0	17	6	+11	16
Leicester City	6	1	3	2	8	8	0	6
Exeter City	6	1	3	2	7	11	−4	6
Norwich City	6	0	3	3	5	12	−7	3

Updated to match(es) played on 28 February 2019. Source:

5 October 2018	Leicester City	3–0	Norwich City	Whetstone
19:00	Uche 6'; Shade 17'; Jones 90' (o.g.)			Stadium: Holmes Park; Attendance: 225

7 October 2018	Nottingham Forest	3–1	Exeter City	Alfreton
14:00	Edser 23'; Richardson 39'; En Neyah 57'		Dodd 64'	Stadium: North Street; Attendance: 98

8 November 2018	Exeter City	1–1	Norwich City	Exeter
19:00	Seymour 45+1'	Report	Spyrou 22'	Stadium: St James Park; Attendance: 253

12 November 2018	Leicester City	1–2	Nottingham Forest	Whetstone
19:00	Leshabela 41'		Gomis 32', 78'	Stadium: Holmes Park; Attendance: 286

30 November 2018	Norwich City	0–1	Nottingham Forest	Norwich
19:00			Gabriel 14'	Stadium: Lotus Training Centre

16 January 2019	Leicester City	1–1	Exeter City	Whetstone
19:00	Dewsbury-Hall 83'		Seymour 71' (pen.)	Stadium: Holmes Park

21 January 2019	Exeter City	0–5	Nottingham Forest	Exeter
19:00		Report	Gomis 36', 54', 68'; Gabriel 74'; Kadded 90+1' (pen.)	Stadium: St James Park; Attendance: 333

21 January 2019	Norwich City	1–1	Leicester City	Norwich
19:00	Keller 9'		Muskwe 34'	Stadium: Lotus Training Centre; Attendance: 200

11 February 2019	Norwich City	0–3	Exeter City	Norwich
19:00			Hartridge 53'; Randall 62'; Key 76'	Stadium: Lotus Training Centre

21 February 2019	Exeter City	1–1	Leicester City	Exeter
19:00	Sparkes 48'		Sherif 33'	Stadium: St James Park; Attendance: 404

25 February 2019	Nottingham Forest	3–3	Norwich City	Alfreton
15:00	Johnson 40' (pen.); Taylor 50'; Coveny 90+2'		Idah 1'; Yahyai 69'; Mehmeti 80'	Stadium: North Street; Attendance: 92

28 February 2019	Nottingham Forest	3–1	Leicester City	Alfreton
13:00	Johnson 45' (pen.), 87'; Ward 51'		Muskwe 10'	Stadium: North Street; Attendance: 94

=== Group E ===
Team	Pld	W	D	L	GF	GA	GD	Pts
Swansea City	6	3	2	1	9	5	+4	11
Wolverhampton Wanderers	6	3	2	1	7	5	+2	11
Oxford United	6	2	1	3	6	7	−1	7
Hull City	6	1	1	4	6	11	−5	4

Updated to match(es) played on 26 February 2019. Source:

4 October 2018	Oxford United	1–0	Swansea City	Thame
19:00	James 10'			Stadium: Meadow View Park; Attendance: 250

5 October 2018	Wolverhampton Wanderers	2–1	Hull City	Wellington
19:00	Watt 35'; Ashley-Seal 78'		Lewis-Potter 14'	Stadium: New Bucks Head

10 November 2018	Swansea City	1–1	Wolverhampton Wanderers	Landore
12:00	Cooper 46'		Ashley-Seal 86'	Stadium: Landore Training Centre

12 November 2018	Hull City	2–1	Oxford United	Kingston upon Hull
19:00	Lewis-Potter 44', 64'		Bradbury 50'	Stadium: East Riding County Football Association

30 November 2018	Swansea City	2–1	Hull City	Landore
19:00	de Boer 10'; Byers 17'		Chadwick 54'	Stadium: Landore Training Centre

3 December 2018	Oxford United	1–1	Wolverhampton Wanderers	Thame
19:00	Bradbury 77' (pen.)		Heredia 79'	Stadium: Meadow View Park; Attendance: 187

19 January 2019	Swansea City	2–0	Oxford United	Landore
12:00	Garrick 38'; Asoro 79'			Stadium: Landore Training Centre

21 January 2019	Hull City	0–1	Wolverhampton Wanderers	Kingston upon Hull
19:00			Ennis 45'	Stadium: East Riding County Football Association

12 February 2019	Oxford United	3–0	Hull City	Thame
19:00	Smith 44'; James 50'; Lofthouse 90+3'			Stadium: Meadow View Park; Attendance: 156

22 February 2019	Hull City	2–2	Swansea City	Kingston upon Hull
19:00	Lewis-Potter 58', 76'		King 13', 73'	Stadium: East Riding County Football Association

22 February 2019	Wolverhampton Wanderers	2–0	Oxford United	Wolverhampton
19:00	Ennis 15'; Paulinho 86'	Report		Stadium: Molineux Stadium; Attendance: 918

26 February 2019	Wolverhampton Wanderers	0–2	Swansea City	Compton
18:00			Kilman 62' (o.g.); Cooper 90+3'	Stadium: Compton Park Training Ground

=== Group F ===
Team	Pld	W	D	L	GF	GA	GD	Pts
Derby County	6	4	1	1	18	4	+14	13
Aston Villa	6	4	0	2	15	6	+9	12
Plymouth Argyle	6	1	3	2	6	8	−2	6
Bristol City	6	0	2	4	4	25	−21	2

Updated to match(es) played on 25 February 2019. Source:

4 October 2018	Plymouth Argyle	0–0	Derby County	Plymouth
19:00				Stadium: Home Park; Attendance: 281

5 October 2018	Aston Villa	8–0	Bristol City	Aston
19:00	Cox 13'; Blackett-Taylor 26'; O'Hare 32', 42', 65'; Knibbs 80', 84'; Sea 86'			Stadium: Villa Park

8 November 2018	Derby County	0–1	Aston Villa	Loughborough
19:00			Knibbs 68'	Stadium: Loughborough University Stadium

9 November 2018	Bristol City	0–0	Plymouth Argyle	Bristol
19:00				Stadium: Ashton Gate

30 November 2018	Aston Villa	1–0	Plymouth Argyle	Aston
19:00	Cox 71'			Stadium: Villa Park

30 November 2018	Bristol City	1–4	Derby County	Stroud
19:00	Hegeler 90+4' (pen.)		Butterfield 67' (pen.); Hunt 71'; McAllister 74'; Splatt 90'	Stadium: South Gloucestershire and Stroud College

18 January 2019	Bristol City	0–3	Aston Villa	Stroud
19:00			Mooney 26'; Doyle-Hayes 67'; O'Hare 90'	Stadium: South Gloucestershire and Stroud College

21 January 2019	Derby County	4–0	Plymouth Argyle	Loughborough
19:00	Elšnik 10'; Cresswell 14', 35'; Shonibare 37'			Stadium: Loughborough University Stadium

11 February 2019	Aston Villa	1–2	Derby County	Walsall
19:00	Wright 76'		Shonibare 56'; Babos 68'	Stadium: Bescot Stadium

11 February 2019	Plymouth Argyle	2–2	Bristol City	Plymouth
19:00	Purrington 40'; Battle 72'		Eisa 55'; Richards 82'	Stadium: Home Park; Attendance: 128

24 February 2019	Derby County	8–1	Bristol City	Loughborough
13:00	Cresswell 9', 68', 77' (pen.), 88'; Mitchell-Lawson 18', 32', 42'; Shonibare 20'		Bell 69'	Stadium: Loughborough University Stadium

25 February 2019	Plymouth Argyle	4–1	Aston Villa	Plymouth
19:00	Battle 37'; Jephcott 45' (pen.); Rooney 51'; Fletcher 67'		Wright 17'	Stadium: Home Park; Attendance: 212

=== Group G ===
Team	Pld	W	D	L	GF	GA	GD	Pts
Reading	6	4	1	1	15	7	+8	13
Fulham	6	4	0	2	16	5	+11	12
Birmingham City	6	3	1	2	11	9	+2	10
Colchester United	6	0	0	6	3	24	−21	0

Updated to match(es) played on 22 February 2019. Source:

5 October 2018	Colchester United	1–3	Reading	Colchester
19:00	Chilvers 90+2' (pen.)		House 43'; Barrett 76'; Frost 89'	Stadium: Colchester Community Stadium

6 October 2018	Birmingham City	1–2	Fulham	Solihull
12:00	Anderson 66'		De La Torre 16'; Elliott 21'	Stadium: Damson Park

10 November 2018	Fulham	5–0	Colchester United	Fulham
13:00	Thompson 10'; Santos 28'; O'Riley 44', 49', 74'			Stadium: Craven Cottage

12 November 2018	Reading	3–0	Birmingham City	Woking
19:00	Frost 65', 73' (pen.), 90+3' (pen.)			Stadium: Kingfield Stadium

3 December 2018	Colchester United	0–4	Birmingham City	Colchester
19:00			McFarlane 11', 90+5'; Stirk 35'; Anderson 81'	Stadium: Colchester Community Stadium

3 December 2018	Reading	2–1	Fulham	Woking
19:00	Popa 59'; Lawless 61'		Santos 83'	Stadium: Kingfield Stadium

18 January 2019	Fulham	1–2	Birmingham City	New Malden
15:00	Adebayo 71'		Bajrami 17'; Bellingham 36'	Stadium: Motspur Park

18 January 2019	Reading	5–1	Colchester United	Woking
19:00	Nolan 34'; Liddle 59', 88'; Barrett 72', 79'		Trialist 8'	Stadium: Kingfield Stadium

8 February 2019	Birmingham City	2–2	Reading	Solihull
14:00	Bailey 57', 62'		Holmes 12'; Rollinson 34'	Stadium: Damson Park

11 February 2019	Colchester United	0–5	Fulham	Colchester
19:00			Santos 16', 77'; Drameh 64'; O'Riley 84'; Käit 87'	Stadium: Colchester Community Stadium

22 February 2019	Birmingham City	2–1	Colchester United	Nuneaton
12:00	Bajrami 79'; Bailey 84' (pen.)		Miller 90+1'	Stadium: Liberty Way

22 February 2019	Fulham	2–0	Reading	New Malden
14:00	Elliott 19'; Abraham 79'			Stadium: Motspur Park

=== Group H ===
Team	Pld	W	D	L	GF	GA	GD	Pts
Leeds United	6	4	0	2	14	8	+6	12
Newcastle United	6	3	2	1	11	7	+4	11
Southampton	6	3	1	2	18	10	+8	10
Notts County	6	0	1	5	6	24	−18	1

Updated to match(es) played on 25 February 2019. Source:

4 October 2018	Newcastle United	2–1	Notts County	Newcastle-upon-Tyne
19:00	Sørensen 18'; Roberts 43'		Bingham 77'	Stadium: Northumberland Football Association; Attendance: 127

5 October 2018	Southampton	2–1	Leeds United	Marchwood
19:00	Obafemi 31'; Slattery 77' (pen.)	Report	Temenuzhkov 61'	Stadium: Staplewood Campus; Attendance: 100

25 October 2018	Notts County	0–5	Leeds United	Ilkeston
14:00			Edmondson 30', 66'; Oduor 42'; Gotts 43'; Dalby 60'	Stadium: New Manor Ground

9 November 2018	Southampton	1–1	Newcastle United	Marchwood
19:00	Barnes 18'	Report	Sørensen 89'	Stadium: Staplewood Campus; Attendance: 0

28 November 2018	Notts County	0–7	Southampton	Ilkeston
14:00		Report	Hamblin 23'; Johnson 29', 38', 79'; Smallbone 32', 47', 82'	Stadium: New Manor Ground; Attendance: 0

30 November 2018	Newcastle United	2–0	Leeds United	Newcastle-upon-Tyne
19:00	Sørensen 29'; Wilson 90+2'	Report		Stadium: Northumberland Football Association; Attendance: 268

21 January 2019	Leeds United	3–2	Southampton	Tadcaster
19:00	Halme 9'; Díaz 75'; Edmondson 80'		Sims 53'; Barnes 57'	Stadium: Ings Lane; Attendance: 2,894

22 January 2019	Notts County	2–2	Newcastle United	Ilkeston
14:00	Osborne 22'; Ward 58'	Report	Sangare 69'; Watts 88'	Stadium: New Manor Ground; Attendance: 120 estimated

8 February 2019	Newcastle United	3–0	Southampton	Newcastle-upon-Tyne
19:00	Charman 28'; Toure 80', 90+2'	Report		Stadium: Northumberland Football Association; Attendance: 165

15 February 2019	Leeds United	2–1	Notts County	Guiseley
19:00	Brown 31' (pen.); Edmondson 86'		Patching 57'	Stadium: Nethermoor Park; Attendance: 677

22 February 2019	Southampton	6–2	Notts County	Marchwood
19:00	Johnson 3', 26'; Sims 25', 79'; N'Lundulu 64', 66'	Report	Osborne 12'; Patching 65'	Stadium: Staplewood Campus; Attendance: 0

25 February 2019	Leeds United	3–1	Newcastle United	Guiseley
19:00	Edmondson 25', 47'; Struijk 60'		Sterry 26'	Stadium: Nethermoor Park; Attendance: 1,012

== Knockout stages ==
=== Round of 16 ===
14 March 2019	Leeds United	2–2 (a.e.t.) (5–4 p)	Fulham	Guiseley
19:00	Edmondson 44' (pen.); Brown 78'		O'Riley 52' (pen.); Santos 60'	Stadium: Nethermoor Park; Attendance: 975
	Penalties
	Brown (penalty scored); Bogusz (penalty scored); Struijk (penalty scored); Stevens (penalty missed); Clarke (penalty scored); Berardi (penalty scored)		(penalty missed) Sessegnon; (penalty scored) De Havilland; (penalty scored) Hilton; (penalty scored) O'Riley; (penalty scored) Opoku; (penalty missed) Santos

15 March 2019	Reading	1–2	Newcastle United	Woking
13:00	Barrett 25'		Sterry 22'; Allan 37'	Stadium: Kingfield Stadium

15 March 2019	Nottingham Forest	2–1	AFC Bournemouth	West Bridgford
13:00	Hayes 44'; Ward 45+1'		Camp 81'	Stadium: City Ground

15 March 2019	Burnley	1–0	Leicester City	Burnley
14:30	Agyei 67'			Stadium: Barnfield Training Centre

15 March 2019	Stoke City	1–4	Blackburn Rovers	Stoke-on-Trent
18:30	Collins 21'		Carter 16'; Rankin-Costello 50', 90'; Vale 67'	Stadium: Clayton Wood Training Ground

15 March 2019	Swansea City	2–0	Aston Villa	Landore
19:00	Cabango 11'; Garrick 19'			Stadium: Landore Training Centre

17 March 2019	Derby County	2–1 (a.e.t.)	Wolverhampton Wanderers	Derby
13:00	Mitchell-Lawson 9'; Cresswell 59'		Giles 80'	Stadium: Pride Park Stadium

29 March 2019	Everton	2–1	Sunderland	Southport
19:00	Sambou 67' (pen.); Gordon 88'		Kokolo 81'	Stadium: Haig Avenue

=== Quarter–final ===
29 March 2019	Burnley	1–3	Leeds United	Burnley
14:30	Agyei 44'		N'Guessan 15' (o.g.); Edmondson 65'; Díaz 81'	Stadium: Barnfield Training Centre; Attendance: Behind Closed Doors

29 March 2019	Nottingham Forest	0–0 (a.e.t.) (0–3 p)	Swansea City	Alfreton
15:00				Stadium: North Street; Attendance: 150
	Penalties
	Coveny (penalty missed); Mighten (penalty missed); Johnson (penalty missed)		(penalty scored) King; (penalty scored) Marić; (penalty scored) Blake

1 April 2019	Newcastle United	3–2 (a.e.t.)	Derby County	Newcastle-upon-Tyne
13:00	Bailey 39'; Longstaff 42'; Sangare 95'	Report	McDonald 68'; Shonibare 77'	Stadium: Northumberland Football Association; Attendance: 142

23 April 2019	Everton	2–1	Blackburn Rovers	Walton
19:00	Sambou 4' (pen.); Bowler 28'		Chapman 64'	Stadium: Goodison Park; Attendance: 350

=== Semi–final ===
23 April 2019	Leeds United	0–3	Newcastle United	Guiseley
19:00		Report	Watts 50' (pen.); Roberts 54'; Sørensen 90+6'	Stadium: Nethermoor Park; Attendance: 3,051

4 May 2019	Swansea City	0–2	Everton	Swansea
12:00		Report	Hornby 14'; Sambou 74'	Stadium: Liberty Stadium; Referee: Christopher Pollard

=== Final ===
8 May 2019
19:00

Everton	1–0	Newcastle United
Feeney 59'	Report

Goodison Park, Walton
Attendance: 1,500

Note: Flags indicate national team as defined under FIFA eligibility rules; some limited exceptions apply. Players may hold more than one non-FIFA nationality.

Everton
No.	Pos.	Nation	Player
1	GK	POR	João Virgínia
2	DF	WAL	Ryan Astley
3	DF	ZIM	Brendan Galloway
4	DF	CUW	Nathangelo Markelo
5	DF	ENG	Morgan Feeney
6	MF	ENG	Lewis Gibson
7	MF	ENG	Josh Bowler
8	MF	ENG	Dennis Adeniran
9	FW	SCO	Fraser Hornby
10	FW	ENG	Bassala Sambou
11	MF	ENG	Antony Evans
Substitutes:
12	FW	WAL	Nathan Broadhead
13	GK	POL	Mateusz Hewelt
14	DF	ENG	Matty Foulds
15	MF	ENG	Alex Denny
16	DF	ENG	Kyle John
Coach: (England) David Unsworth

Newcastle United
No.	Pos.	Nation	Player
1	GK	ENG	Nathan Harker
2	DF	ENG	Jamie Sterry
3	DF	ENG	Liam Gibson
4	MF	ENG	Owen Bailey
5	DF	ENG	Lewis Cass
6	DF	ENG	Kelland Watts
7	FW	ENG	Thomas Allan
8	MF	LBR	Mohammed Sangare
9	FW	ENG	Luke Charman
10	MF	ENG	Matty Longstaff
11	MF	ENG	Callum Roberts
Substitutes:
12	DF	ENG	Oliver Walters
13	GK	FIN	Otto Huuhtanen
14	DF	ENG	Rosaire Longelo
15	FW	DEN	Elias Sørensen
16	FW	SUI	Yannick Toure
Coach: (England) Chris Hogg

== See also ==
- 2018–19 Professional U23 Development League
- 2018–19 FA Youth Cup
