= 2019–20 Everton F.C. season =

English football club season

Everton
2019–20 season
- Chairman: Bill Kenwright
- Manager: Marco Silva (until 5 December 2019); Duncan Ferguson (caretaker, from 5 to 21 December 2019); Carlo Ancelotti (from 21 December 2019)
- Stadium: Goodison Park
- Premier League: 12th
- FA Cup: Third Round
- EFL Cup: Quarter-Final
- Top goalscorer: League: Dominic Calvert-Lewin; Richarlison (13); All: Dominic Calvert-Lewin; Richarlison (15)
- Highest home attendance: League/all: 39,374 (1 Sep 2019 v Wolves, PL)
- Lowest home attendance: League/all: 39,066 (18 Aug 2019 v Watford, PL)
- Average home league attendance: 39,256
Home colours	Away colours	Third colours

2018–19 third kit was used vs Crystal Palace (10 August).

The 2019–20 season was Everton's 117th (an English record) and 66th consecutive season in the top flight of English football. They participated in the Premier League, the FA Cup and the EFL Cup. The season covered the period from 1 July 2019 to 26 July 2020.

Marco Silva started as manager one year into a three-year contract. Silva was sacked on 5 December 2019, after a 5–2 defeat to city rivals Liverpool which left the team in 18th place. Duncan Ferguson was named as caretaker manager. In Ferguson's first game in charge two days later, Everton beat Chelsea 3–1 to lift themselves out of the relegation zone. Following the appointment of Carlo Ancelotti as the new manager later that month, Ferguson was made assistant manager.

== Transfers ==
=== Transfers in ===
Date	Position	Nationality	Name	From	Fee	Team	Ref.
1 July 2019	CM	(Portugal)	André Gomes	(Spain) Barcelona	£22,000,000	First team	
1 July 2019	CB	(Denmark)	Sebastian Kristensen	(Denmark) Lyngby	Undisclosed	Academy	
1 July 2019	GK	(Denmark)	Jonas Lössl	(England) Huddersfield Town	Free transfer	First team	
15 July 2019	CM	(England)	Fabian Delph	(England) Manchester City	£10,000,000	First team	
2 August 2019	DM	(Ivory Coast)	Jean-Philippe Gbamin	(Germany) Mainz 05	£25,000,000	First team	
4 August 2019	CF	(Italy)	Moise Kean	(Italy) Juventus	£25,100,000	First team	
8 August 2019	LW	(Nigeria)	Alex Iwobi	(England) Arsenal	£28,000,000	First team	
13 January 2020	CB	(England)	Jarrad Branthwaite	(England) Carlisle United	Undisclosed	Academy	

=== Loans in ===
Date from	Position	Nationality	Name	From	Date until	Team	Ref.
7 August 2019	RB	(France)	Djibril Sidibé	(France) Monaco	30 June 2020	First team	

=== Loans out ===
Date from	Position	Nationality	Name	To	Date until	Team	Ref.
1 July 2019	RB	(England)	Jonjoe Kenny	(Germany) Schalke 04	30 June 2020	First team	
2 July 2019	CF	(Spain)	Sandro Ramírez	(Spain) Valladolid	30 June 2020	First team	
11 July 2019	CF	(England)	Korede Adedoyin	(Scotland) Hamilton Academical	30 June 2020	Under-23s	
11 July 2019	AM	(England)	Kieran Dowell	(England) Derby County	3 January 2020	First team	
11 July 2019	GK	(Portugal)	João Virgínia	(England) Reading	7 January 2020	Under-23s	
12 July 2019	LB	(England)	Luke Garbutt	(England) Ipswich Town	30 June 2020	First team	
15 July 2019	SS	(Switzerland)	Shani Tarashaj	(Netherlands) FC Emmen	30 June 2021	First team	
18 July 2019	RW	(England)	Josh Bowler	(England) Hull City	30 June 2020	Under-23s	
2 August 2019	LW	(Wales)	Nathan Broadhead	(England) Burton Albion	30 June 2020	Under-23s	
8 August 2019	DM	(Bosnia and Herzegovina)	Muhamed Bešić	(England) Sheffield United	30 June 2020	First team	
8 August 2019	CB	(England)	Matthew Pennington	(England) Hull City	30 June 2020	First team	
27 August 2019	SS	(Scotland)	Fraser Hornby	(Belgium) Kortrijk	30 June 2020	Under-23s	
29 August 2019	DM	(England)	Callum Connolly	(England) Lincoln City	5 January 2020	Under-23s	
2 September 2019	LW	(Democratic Republic of the Congo)	Yannick Bolasie	(Portugal) Sporting CP	30 June 2020	First team	
3 January 2020	AM	(England)	Kieran Dowell	(England) Wigan Athletic	30 June 2020	First team	
6 January 2020	DM	(England)	Callum Connolly	(England) Fleetwood Town	30 June 2020	Under-23s	
10 January 2020	CF	(Turkey)	Cenk Tosun	(England) Crystal Palace	30 June 2020	First team	
30 January 2020	CB	(England)	Morgan Feeney	(England) Tranmere Rovers	30 June 2020	Under-23s	
31 January 2020	CB	(England)	Lewis Gibson	(England) Fleetwood Town	30 June 2020	Under-23s	
31 January 2020	GK	(Denmark)	Jonas Lössl	(England) Huddersfield Town	30 June 2020	First team	
31 January 2020	CF	(England)	Kieran Phillips	(England) Huddersfield Town	30 June 2020	Under-23s	

=== Transfers out ===
Date	Position	Nationality	Name	To	Fee	Team	Ref.
1 July 2019	RW	(Scotland)	Daniel Bramall	(England) Matlock Town	Released	Under-23s	
1 July 2019	CB	(England)	Michael Collins	(England) Sunderland	Released	Academy	
1 July 2019	GK	(Poland)	Mateusz Hewelt	(Poland) Miedź Legnica	Released	Under-23s	
1 July 2019	GK	(England)	Joe Hilton	(England) Blackburn Rovers	Released	Under-23s	
1 July 2019	CB	(England)	Phil Jagielka	(England) Sheffield United	Released	First team	
1 July 2019	CM	(England)	Jack Kiersey	(England) Walsall	Released	Under-23s	
1 July 2019	CF	(Northern Ireland)	Shayne Lavery	(Northern Ireland) Linfield	Released	Under-23s	
1 July 2019	CF	(France)	Boris Mathis	(France) Rodez	Released	Under-23s	
1 July 2019	CB	(Northern Ireland)	Barney McKeown	Free agent	Released	Academy	
1 July 2019	GK	(England)	Chris Renshaw	(England) Witton Albion	Released	Under-23s	
1 July 2019	CB	(England)	Elliot Richards	Free agent	Released	Academy	
1 July 2019	MF	(England)	Kameron Stanley	Free agent	Released	Academy	
1 July 2019	DF	(Northern Ireland)	Ethan Warnock	Free agent	Released	Academy	
1 July 2019	DM	(England)	Tom Warren	Free agent	Released	Academy	
1 July 2019	CB	(Wales)	Ashley Williams	(England) Bristol City	Released	First team	
1 July 2019	AM	(Croatia)	Nikola Vlašić	(Russia) CSKA Moscow	£14,000,000	First team	
1 July 2019	RB	(Poland)	Paweł Żuk	(Poland) Lechia Gdańsk	Released	Academy	
3 July 2019	LB	(England)	Brendan Galloway	(England) Luton Town	Free transfer	First team	
15 July 2019	LB	(United States)	Antonee Robinson	(England) Wigan Athletic	Undisclosed	Under-23s	
23 July 2019	CF	(Germany)	Bassala Sambou	(Netherlands) Fortuna Sittard	Compensation	Under-23s	
25 July 2019	LW	(England)	Ademola Lookman	(Germany) RB Leipzig	£18,000,000	First team	
30 July 2019	CM	(Senegal)	Idrissa Gueye	(France) Paris Saint-Germain	£30,000,000	First team	
31 July 2019	CM	(England)	Joe Williams	(England) Wigan Athletic	Undisclosed	Under-23s	
7 August 2019	CM	(Republic of Ireland)	James McCarthy	(England) Crystal Palace	£5,000,000	First Team	
12 August 2019	LW	(Nigeria)	Henry Onyekuru	(France) Monaco	Undisclosed	First Team	
30 August 2019	RW	(Belgium)	Kevin Mirallas	(Belgium) Antwerp	Free transfer	First Team	
18 January 2020	CM	(Republic of Ireland)	Harry Charsley	(England) Mansfield Town	Free transfer	Under-23s	
29 January 2020	AM	(England)	Antony Evans	(Germany) SC Paderborn	Undisclosed	Under-23s	

== Pre-season ==
On 12 June 2019, Everton announced their pre-season fixtures. They also competed in the 2019 edition of the Opel Cup.

7 July 2019 SportPesa Trophy	Kariobangi Sharks	1–1	Everton	Kasarani, Kenya
16:00 EAT	Abuya 26'	Report	Williams 53'	Stadium: Moi International Sports Centre

14 July 2019 Friendly	FC Sion	0–0	Everton	Bagnes, Switzerland
TBC CEST		Report		Stadium: Stade Saint-Marc

19 July 2019 Friendly	Monaco	0–1	Everton	Bagnes, Switzerland
18:00 CEST		Report	Coleman 73'

24 July 2019 Friendly	Wigan Athletic	0–0	Everton	Wigan
19:45 BST		Report		Stadium: DW Stadium

27 July 2019 Opel Cup	Sevilla	1–0	Everton	Mainz, Germany
13:00 CEST	Ocampos 47' (pen.)	Report		Stadium: Opel Arena

27 July 2019 Opel Cup	Mainz 05	3–1	Everton	Mainz, Germany
16:00 CEST	Quaison 30', 59'; Eyibil 36'	Report	Gibson 40'	Stadium: Opel Arena

3 August 2019 Friendly	Werder Bremen	0–0	Everton	Bremen, Germany
15:00 CEST		Report		Stadium: Weserstadion

== Competitions ==
=== Premier League ===
==== League table ====
Pos	Team	Pld	W	D	L	GF	GA	GD	Pts
10	Burnley	38	15	9	14	43	50	−7	54
11	Southampton	38	15	7	16	51	60	−9	52
12	Everton	38	13	10	15	44	56	−12	49
13	Newcastle United	38	11	11	16	38	58	−20	44
14	Crystal Palace	38	11	10	17	31	50	−19	43

Source: Premier League
Rules for classification: 1) Points; 2) Goal difference; 3) Goals scored; 4) If the champions, relegated teams or qualified teams for UEFA competitions cannot be determined by rules 1 to 3, rules 4.1 to 4.3 are applied – 4.1) Points gained in head to head record between such teams; 4.2) Away goals scored in head to head record between such teams; 4.3) Play-offs

==== Results summary ====
Overall								Home						Away					
Pld	W	D	L	GF	GA	GD	Pts	W	D	L	GF	GA	GD	W	D	L	GF	GA	GD
38	13	10	15	44	56	−12	49	8	7	4	24	21	+3	5	3	11	20	35	−15

Last updated: 26 July 2020.
Source: Premier League

==== Results by matchday ====
Matchday	1	2	3	4	5	6	7	8	9	10	11	12	13	14	15	16	17	18	19	20	21	22	23	24	25	26	27	28	29	30	31	32	33	34	35	36	37	38
Ground	A	H	A	H	A	H	H	A	H	A	H	A	H	A	A	H	A	H	H	A	A	H	A	H	A	H	A	H	A	H	A	H	A	H	A	H	A	H
Result	D	W	L	W	L	L	L	L	W	L	D	W	L	L	L	W	D	D	W	W	L	W	D	D	W	W	L	D	L	D	W	W	L	D	L	D	W	L
Position	11	9	12	6	12	14	15	18	15	16	17	15	16	17	18	14	16	15	13	10	11	11	11	12	9	9	11	11	12	12	12	11	11	11	11	11	11	12

Updated to match(es) played on 26 July 2020. Source: Statto.com
A = Away; H = Home; W = Win; D = Draw; L = Loss

==== Matches ====
On 13 June 2019, the Premier League fixtures were announced.

10 August 2019 1	Crystal Palace	0–0	Everton	Selhurst
15:00 BST	Meyer (yellow card) 38'; Milivojević (yellow card) 55'	Report	Bernard (yellow card) 52'; Schneiderlin (yellow card) 54' (yellow-red card) 76'	Stadium: Selhurst Park; Attendance: 25,151; Referee: Jonathan Moss

17 August 2019 2	Everton	1–0	Watford	Liverpool
15:00 BST	Bernard 10'; Coleman (yellow card) 14'; Gomes (yellow card) 47'	Report	Capoue (yellow card) 31'; Holebas (yellow card) 59'; Pereyra (yellow card) 62'	Stadium: Goodison Park; Attendance: 39,066; Referee: Lee Mason

23 August 2019 3	Aston Villa	2–0	Everton	Birmingham
20:00 BST	Guilbert (yellow card) 5'; Moraes 21'; Trézéguet (yellow card) 85'; El Ghazi 90+5'	Report	Calvert-Lewin (yellow card) 52'; Gomes (yellow card) 80'; Coleman (yellow card) 85'	Stadium: Villa Park; Attendance: 41,922; Referee: Michael Oliver
Note: Live on Sky Sports

1 September 2019 4	Everton	3–2	Wolverhampton Wanderers	Liverpool
14:00 BST	Richarlison 5', 80'; Iwobi 12'; Delph (yellow card) 63'	Report	Saïss 9'; Vinagre (yellow card) 39'; Jiménez (yellow card) 44', (goal) 75'; Boly (yellow card) 49' (yellow-red card) 90+5'; Bennett (yellow card) 58'; Neto (yellow card) 90+4'	Stadium: Goodison Park; Attendance: 39,374; Referee: Anthony Taylor
Note: Live on Sky Sports

15 September 2019 5	Bournemouth	3–1	Everton	Bournemouth
14:00 BST	C. Wilson 23', 72'; Fraser 67'	Report	Delph (yellow card) 40'; Calvert-Lewin 44'; Digne (yellow card) 58'; Richarlison (yellow card) 66'	Stadium: Vitality Stadium; Attendance: 10,416; Referee: Paul Tierney
Note: Live on Sky Sports

21 September 2019 6	Everton	0–2	Sheffield United	Liverpool
15:00 BST	Bernard (yellow card) 21'	Report	Norwood (yellow card) 16'; Baldock (yellow card) 21'; Henderson (yellow card) 21'; Mina 40' (o.g.); Mousset 79'	Stadium: Goodison Park; Attendance: 39,354; Referee: Simon Hooper

28 September 2019 7	Everton	1–3	Manchester City	Liverpool
17:30 BST	Calvert-Lewin 33'; Schneiderlin (yellow card) 59'; Mina (yellow card) 70'	Report	Gabriel Jesus 24'; Rodrigo (yellow card) 38'; Otamendi (yellow card) 51'; Mahrez 71'; Sterling 84'	Stadium: Goodison Park; Attendance: 39,222; Referee: Michael Oliver
Note: Live on Sky Sports

5 October 2019 8	Burnley	1–0	Everton	Burnley
15:00 BST	Hendrick (yellow card) 64', (goal) 72'; Westwood (yellow card) 90+4'	Report	Coleman (yellow card) 43' (yellow-red card) 56'; Sidibé (yellow card) 86'	Stadium: Turf Moor; Attendance: 20,650; Referee: Graham Scott

19 October 2019 9	Everton	2–0	West Ham United	Liverpool
12:30 BST	Bernard 17'; Davies (yellow card) 45+3'; Gomes (yellow card) 90+1'; Sigurðsson 90+2'	Report	Rice (yellow card) 70'; Diop (yellow card) 79'	Stadium: Goodison Park; Attendance: 39,263; Referee: Paul Tierney

26 October 2019 10	Brighton & Hove Albion	3–2	Everton	Falmer
15:00 BST	Groß 15'; Stephens (yellow card) 33'; Maupay 80' (pen.); Pröpper (yellow card) 90+3'; Digne 90+4' (o.g.)	Report	Webster 20' (o.g.); Calvert-Lewin 74'; Holgate (yellow card) 86'	Stadium: AMEX Stadium; Attendance: 30,529; Referee: Andrew Madley

3 November 2019 11	Everton	1–1	Tottenham Hotspur	Liverpool
16:30 GMT	Walcott (yellow card) 30'; Tosun 90+7'	Report	Eriksen (yellow card) 31'; Alli 63'; Ndombele (yellow card) 65'; Son (red card) 79'	Stadium: Goodison Park; Attendance: 39,001; Referee: Martin Atkinson

9 November 2019 12	Southampton	1–2	Everton	Southampton
15:00 GMT	Ings 50'; Boufal (yellow card) 88'	Report	Davies 4'; Sidibé (yellow card) 65'; Richarlison 75'	Stadium: St Mary's Stadium; Attendance: 29,754; Referee: Paul Tierney

23 November 2019 13	Everton	0–2	Norwich City	Liverpool
15:00 GMT	Schneiderlin (yellow card) 20'; Holgate (yellow card) 81'; Coleman (yellow card) 90+3'	Report	Zimmermann (yellow card) 23'; Byram (yellow card) 47'; Cantwell 55'; Aarons (yellow card) 81'; Tettey (yellow card) 84'; McLean (yellow card) 87'; Srbeny 90+2'	Stadium: Goodison Park; Attendance: 39,241; Referee: Anthony Taylor

1 December 2019 14	Leicester City	2–1	Everton	Leicester
16:30 GMT	Vardy 68'; Iheanacho 90+4'	Report	Richarlison 23'; Sigurðsson (yellow card) 45+2'	Stadium: King Power Stadium; Attendance: 32,144; Referee: Graham Scott

4 December 2019 15	Liverpool	5–2	Everton	Liverpool
20:15 GMT	Origi 6', 31'; Shaqiri 17'; Alexander-Arnold (yellow card) 27'; Mané 45'; Wijnaldum 90'	Report	Keane 21'; Richarlison (yellow card) 31', (goal) 45+3'; Davies (yellow card) 67'	Stadium: Anfield; Attendance: 53,094; Referee: Mike Dean

7 December 2019 16	Everton	3–1	Chelsea	Liverpool
12:30 GMT	Richarlison 5', (yellow card) 42'; Digne (yellow card) 30'; Calvert-Lewin 49', 84', (yellow card) 68'	Report	Kovačić 52'	Stadium: Goodison Park; Attendance: 39,114; Referee: Craig Pawson

15 December 2019 17	Manchester United	1–1	Everton	Manchester
14:00 GMT	Lindelöf (yellow card) 66'; Greenwood 77'	Report	Davies (yellow card) 5'; Lindelöf 36' (o.g.); Richarlison (yellow card) 58'	Stadium: Old Trafford; Attendance: 63,328; Referee: Michael Oliver

21 December 2019 18	Everton	0–0	Arsenal	Liverpool
12:30 GMT	Davies (yellow card) 45'; Sigurðsson (yellow card) 75'	Report	Saka (yellow card) 28'; Chambers (yellow card) 87'; Willock (yellow card) 90+2'	Stadium: Goodison Park; Attendance: 39,336; Referee: Kevin Friend

26 December 2019 19	Everton	1–0	Burnley	Liverpool
15:00 GMT	Calvert-Lewin 80'	Report		Stadium: Goodison Park; Attendance: 39,177; Referee: Anthony Taylor

28 December 2019 20	Newcastle United	1–2	Everton	Newcastle
15:00 GMT	Joelinton (yellow card) 45+1'; Schär 56'; Hayden (yellow card) 80'	Report	Calvert-Lewin 13', 64', (yellow card) 90+3'; Davies (yellow card) 55'	Stadium: St James' Park; Attendance: 52,211; Referee: Lee Mason

1 January 2020 21	Manchester City	2–1	Everton	Manchester
17:30 GMT	Gabriel Jesus 51', 58'	Report	Mina (yellow card) 30'; Delph (yellow card) 69'; Richarlison 71'; Davies (yellow card) 79'; Calvert-Lewin (yellow card) 86'	Stadium: Etihad Stadium; Attendance: 54,407; Referee: Andre Marriner

11 January 2020 22	Everton	1–0	Brighton & Hove Albion	Liverpool
15:00 GMT	Richarlison 38'; Calvert-Lewin (yellow card) 78'; Pickford (yellow card) 90+4'	Report	Duffy (yellow card) 79'	Stadium: Goodison Park; Attendance: 38,772; Referee: David Coote

18 January 2020 23	West Ham United	1–1	Everton	Stratford
15:00 GMT	Diop 40'; Zabaleta (yellow card) 90+3'	Report	Calvert-Lewin 44'	Stadium: London Stadium; Attendance: 59,915; Referee: Andre Marriner

21 January 2020 24	Everton	2–2	Newcastle United	Liverpool
19:30 GMT	Kean 30'; Calvert-Lewin 54', (yellow card) 68'	Report	Clark (yellow card) 62'; Lejeune 90+4', 90+5'	Stadium: Goodison Park; Attendance: 38,822; Referee: Simon Hooper

1 February 2020 25	Watford	2–3	Everton	Watford
15:00 GMT	Masina 10', (yellow card) 68'; Pereyra 42'; Success (yellow card) 78'	Report	Mina 45+1', 45+4', (yellow card) 84'; Delph (yellow card) 58' (yellow-red card) 71'; Holgate (yellow card) 86'; Walcott 90'	Stadium: Vicarage Road; Attendance: 21,229; Referee: Craig Pawson

8 February 2020 26	Everton	3–1	Crystal Palace	Liverpool
12:30 GMT	Bernard 18'; Richarlison 58'; Calvert-Lewin 88'	Report	McCarthy (yellow card) 10'; Benteke 51'	Stadium: Goodison Park; Attendance: 38,987; Referee: David Coote

23 February 2020 27	Arsenal	3–2	Everton	Holloway
16:30 GMT	Nketiah 27'; Aubameyang 33', 46'	Report	Calvert-Lewin 1'; Schneiderlin (yellow card) 31'; Richarlison (yellow card) 45+2', (goal) 45+4'; Sigurðsson (yellow card) 73'; Gomes (yellow card) 90+4'	Stadium: Emirates Stadium; Attendance: 60,296; Referee: Stuart Attwell

1 March 2020 28	Everton	1–1	Manchester United	Liverpool
14:00 GMT	Calvert-Lewin 3', (yellow card) 41'; Davies (yellow card) 43'; Sidibé (yellow card) 80'	Report	Fernandes 31'; Shaw (yellow card) 41'; Maguire (yellow card) 45'; Lindelöf (yellow card) 56'; Fred (yellow card) 70'	Stadium: Goodison Park; Attendance: 39,374; Referee: Chris Kavanagh

8 March 2020 29	Chelsea	4–0	Everton	Fulham
14:00 GMT	Mount 14'; Pedro 21'; Willian 51'; Giroud 54'; Zouma (yellow card) 82'	Report	Gomes (yellow card) 53'; Holgate (yellow card) 90+1'	Stadium: Stamford Bridge; Attendance: 40,694; Referee: Kevin Friend

21 June 2020 30	Everton	0–0	Liverpool	Liverpool
19:00 BST	Keane (yellow card) 40'; Digne (yellow card) 61'	Report	Milner (yellow card) 20'; Origi (yellow card) 85'	Stadium: Goodison Park; Attendance: 0 Referee: Mike Dean
Note: The match was postponed on 13 March due to concerns over the coronavirus pandemic. It was rescheduled to 21 June.

24 June 2020 31	Norwich City	0–1	Everton	Norwich
18:00 BST		Report	Keane 55'; Kean (yellow card) 80'	Stadium: Carrow Road; Attendance: 0 Referee: Andrew Madley
Note: The match was postponed on 13 March due to concerns over the coronavirus pandemic. It was rescheduled to 24 June.

1 July 2020 32	Everton	2–1	Leicester City	Liverpool
18:00 BST	Richarlison 10'; Sigurðsson 16' (pen.); Pickford (yellow card) 75'	Report	Iheanacho 51'; Ndidi (yellow card) 54'	Stadium: Goodison Park; Attendance: 0 Referee: David Coote
Note: The match was postponed on 13 March due to concerns over the coronavirus pandemic. It was rescheduled to 1 July.

6 July 2020 33	Tottenham Hotspur	1–0	Everton	Tottenham
20:00 BST	Keane 24' (o.g.); Sissoko (yellow card) 48'; Davies (yellow card) 76'; Alderweireld (yellow card) 84'	Report	Holgate (yellow card) 28'; Gomes (yellow card) 87'	Stadium: Tottenham Hotspur Stadium; Attendance: 0 Referee: Graham Scott
Note: The match was postponed on 13 March due to concerns over the coronavirus pandemic. It was rescheduled to 6 July.

9 July 2020 34	Everton	1–1	Southampton	Liverpool
18:00 BST	Richarlison 43', (yellow card) 45+1'; Calvert-Lewin (yellow card) 45+1'; Digne (yellow card) 90+1'	Report	Armstrong (yellow card) 14'; Ings 31'; Stephens (yellow card) 34'; Bednarek (yellow card) 61'	Stadium: Goodison Park; Attendance: 0 Referee: Lee Mason
Note: The match was postponed on 13 March due to concerns over the coronavirus pandemic. It was rescheduled to 9 July.

12 July 2020 35	Wolverhampton Wanderers	3–0	Everton	Wolverhampton
12:00 BST	Jiménez 45+2' (pen.); Dendoncker 46'; Jota 74'	Report	Digne (yellow card) 19'; Keane (yellow card) 58'	Stadium: Molineux Stadium; Attendance: 0 Referee: Anthony Taylor
Note: The match was postponed on 13 March due to concerns over the coronavirus pandemic. It was rescheduled to 12 July.

16 July 2020 36	Everton	1–1	Aston Villa	Liverpool
18:00 BST	Digne (yellow card) 56'; Richarlison (yellow card) 61'; Walcott 87'	Report	Elmohamady (yellow card) 71'; Konsa 72'	Stadium: Goodison Park; Attendance: 0 Referee: Anthony Taylor
Note: The match was postponed on 3 April due to concerns over the coronavirus pandemic. It was rescheduled to 16 July.

20 July 2020 37	Sheffield United	0–1	Everton	Sheffield
18:00 BST	Norwood (yellow card) 45+2'	Report	Davies (yellow card) 33'; Richarlison 46', (yellow card) 90'; Calvert-Lewin (yellow card) 78'	Stadium: Bramall Lane; Attendance: 0 Referee: Stuart Attwell
Note: The match was postponed on 3 April due to concerns over the coronavirus pandemic. It was rescheduled to 20 July.

26 July 2020 38	Everton	1–3	Bournemouth	Liverpool
16:00 BST	Kean 41'; Keane (yellow card) 79'	Report	King 13' (pen.); Solanke 45+1'; Stanislas 80'	Stadium: Goodison Park; Attendance: 0 Referee: Chris Kavanagh
Note: The match was postponed on 3 April due to concerns over the coronavirus pandemic. It was rescheduled to 26 July.

=== FA Cup ===
The third round draw was made live on BBC Two from Etihad Stadium, Micah Richards and Tony Adams conducted the draw.

5 January 2020 Third round	Liverpool	1–0	Everton	Liverpool
16:01 GMT	Jones 71'	Report	Digne (yellow card) 57'	Stadium: Anfield; Attendance: 52,583; Referee: Jonathan Moss

=== EFL Cup ===
Everton joined the competition in the second round and were drawn away to Lincoln City. They successfully advanced to the third round following a 4–2 win over Lincoln City and were subsequently drawn in the third round away to Sheffield Wednesday. The draw for the fourth round was made on 25 September 2019. The quarter-final draw was conducted on 31 October, live on BBC Radio 2.

28 August 2019 Second round	Lincoln City	2–4	Everton	Lincoln
19:45 BST	Anderson 1', (yellow card) 86'; Andrade (yellow card) 55', (goal) 70'; Shackell (yellow card) 60'; Lewis (yellow card) 90+4'	Report	Digne 36'; Sigurðsson 59' (pen.), (yellow card) 61'; Pickford (yellow card) 61'; Iwobi 81'; Richarlison 88', (yellow card) 89'	Stadium: Sincil Bank; Attendance: 9,971; Referee: Darren Bond
Note: Live on Sky Sports

24 September 2019 Third round	Sheffield Wednesday	0–2	Everton	Owlerton
19:45 BST		Report	Calvert-Lewin 6', 10'; Delph (yellow card) 37'	Stadium: Hillsborough; Attendance: 21,485; Referee: Jeremy Simpson

29 October 2019 Fourth round	Everton	2–0	Watford	Liverpool
19:45 GMT	Holgate 72'; Richarlison 90+3'	Report	Doucouré (yellow card) 68'; Mariappa (yellow card) 90'	Stadium: Goodison Park; Attendance: 34,979; Referee: Simon Hooper

18 December 2019 Quarter-final	Everton	2–2 (2–4 p)	Leicester City	Liverpool
19:45 GMT	Davies 70'; Baines 90+2'	Report	Maddison 26'; Evans 29'	Stadium: Goodison Park; Attendance: 39,027; Referee: Jonathan Moss
	Penalties
	Tosun (penalty missed); Baines (penalty missed); Holgate (penalty scored); Calvert-Lewin (penalty scored)		(penalty missed) Maddison; (penalty scored) Chilwell; (penalty scored) Pereira; (penalty scored) Gray; (penalty scored) Vardy

== Players ==
=== First team squad ===
As of 2 July 2020

Note: Flags indicate national team as defined under FIFA eligibility rules; some limited exceptions apply. Players may hold more than one non-FIFA nationality.

No.	Pos.	Nation	Player
1	GK	ENG	Jordan Pickford
2	DF	ENG	Mason Holgate
3	DF	ENG	Leighton Baines (vice-captain)
5	DF	ENG	Michael Keane
7	FW	BRA	Richarlison
8	MF	ENG	Fabian Delph
9	FW	ENG	Dominic Calvert-Lewin
10	MF	ISL	Gylfi Sigurðsson
11	FW	ENG	Theo Walcott
12	DF	FRA	Lucas Digne
13	DF	COL	Yerry Mina
14	FW	TUR	Cenk Tosun
17	FW	NGA	Alex Iwobi

No.	Pos.	Nation	Player
19	DF	FRA	Djibril Sidibé (on loan from Monaco)
20	MF	BRA	Bernard
21	MF	POR	André Gomes
22	GK	NED	Maarten Stekelenburg
23	DF	IRL	Séamus Coleman (captain)
25	MF	CIV	Jean-Philippe Gbamin
26	MF	ENG	Tom Davies
27	FW	ITA	Moise Kean
31	GK	POR	João Virgínia
32	DF	ENG	Jarrad Branthwaite
34	MF	COD	Beni Baningime
35	MF	ENG	Dennis Adeniran
42	FW	ENG	Anthony Gordon

=== Other players under contract ===
Note: Flags indicate national team as defined under FIFA eligibility rules; some limited exceptions apply. Players may hold more than one non-FIFA nationality.

No.	Pos.	Nation	Player
20	DF	ENG	Jonjoe Kenny
27	MF	BIH	Muhamed Bešić
29	FW	COD	Yannick Bolasie

=== Out on loan ===
As of 2 July 2020

Note: Flags indicate national team as defined under FIFA eligibility rules; some limited exceptions apply. Players may hold more than one non-FIFA nationality.

No.	Pos.	Nation	Player
20	FW	ESP	Sandro Ramírez (at Valladolid until 20 July 2020)
25	DF	ENG	Matthew Pennington (at Hull City until 23 July 2020)
30	MF	ENG	Kieran Dowell (at Wigan Athletic until 23 July 2020)
49	GK	DEN	Jonas Lössl (at Huddersfield Town until 23 July 2020)

== Squad statistics ==
=== Appearances and goals ===
No.	Pos	Nat	Player	Total		Premier League		FA Cup		League Cup	
No.	Pos	Nat	Player	Apps	Goals	Apps	Goals	Apps	Goals	Apps	Goals
Goalkeepers
1	GK	(England) ENG	Jordan Pickford	43	0	38	0	1	0	4	0
22	GK	(Netherlands) NED	Maarten Stekelenburg	0	0	0	0	0	0	0	0
Defenders
2	DF	(England) ENG	Mason Holgate	32	1	24+3	0	1	0	4	1
3	DF	(England) ENG	Leighton Baines	9	1	4+4	0	0	0	1	1
5	DF	(England) ENG	Michael Keane	34	2	28+3	2	0	0	2+1	0
12	DF	(France) FRA	Lucas Digne	39	1	35	0	1	0	3	1
13	DF	(Colombia) COL	Yerry Mina	33	2	25+4	2	1	0	3	0
19	DF	(France) FRA	Djibril Sidibé	28	0	18+7	0	1	0	2	0
23	DF	(Republic of Ireland) IRL	Séamus Coleman	30	0	21+6	0	1	0	2	0
32	DF	(England) ENG	Jarrad Branthwaite	4	0	2+2	0	0	0	0	0
Midfielders
8	MF	(England) ENG	Fabian Delph	20	0	13+3	0	0+1	0	3	0
10	MF	(Iceland) ISL	Gylfi Sigurðsson	38	3	28+7	2	1	0	1+1	1
17	FW	(Nigeria) NGA	Alex Iwobi	29	2	19+6	1	0	0	4	1
20	MF	(Brazil) BRA	Bernard	30	3	15+12	3	0+1	0	2	0
21	MF	(Portugal) POR	André Gomes	20	0	17+2	0	0	0	1	0
25	MF	(Ivory Coast) CIV	Jean-Philippe Gbamin	2	0	1+1	0	0	0	0	0
26	MF	(England) ENG	Tom Davies	32	2	23+7	1	0	0	2	1
Forwards
7	FW	(Brazil) BRA	Richarlison	41	15	36	13	1	0	4	2
9	FW	(England) ENG	Dominic Calvert-Lewin	41	15	30+6	13	1	0	3+1	2
11	FW	(England) ENG	Theo Walcott	29	2	18+7	2	1	0	0+3	0
27	FW	(Italy) ITA	Moise Kean	33	2	6+23	2	0+1	0	2+1	0
42	FW	(England) ENG	Anthony Gordon	12	0	5+6	0	0	0	0+1	0
Players transferred/loaned out during the season
14	FW	(Turkey) TUR	Cenk Tosun	8	1	2+3	1	0	0	0+3	0
18	MF	(France) FRA	Morgan Schneiderlin	18	0	12+3	0	1	0	1+1	0
29	FW	(Senegal) SEN	Oumar Niasse	3	0	0+3	0	0	0	0	0
30	DF	(Curaçao) CUW	Cuco Martina	0	0	0	0	0	0	0	0
31	FW	(Democratic Republic of the Congo) COD	Yannick Bolasie	0	0	0	0	0	0	0	0
49	GK	(Denmark) DEN	Jonas Lössl	0	0	0	0	0	0	0	0

Last updated: 26 July 2020
Source: Competitions

=== Goalscorers ===
As of match played 26 July 2020.

Rank	Pos.	No.	Player	Premier League	FA Cup	League Cup	Total
1	FW	7	(Brazil) Richarlison	13	0	2	15
1	FW	9	(England) Dominic Calvert-Lewin	13	0	2	15
3	MF	10	(Iceland) Gylfi Sigurðsson	2	0	1	3
3	MF	20	(Brazil) Bernard	3	0	0	3
5	DF	5	(England) Michael Keane	2	0	0	2
5	FW	11	(England) Theo Walcott	2	0	0	2
5	DF	13	(Colombia) Yerry Mina	2	0	0	2
5	FW	17	(Nigeria) Alex Iwobi	1	0	1	2
5	MF	26	(England) Tom Davies	1	0	1	2
5	FW	27	(Italy) Moise Kean	2	0	0	2
11	DF	2	(England) Mason Holgate	0	0	1	1
11	DF	3	(England) Leighton Baines	0	0	1	1
11	DF	12	(France) Lucas Digne	0	0	1	1
11	FW	14	(Turkey) Cenk Tosun	1	0	0	1
Total				42	0	10	52

Source: Match reports in Competitions

=== Assists ===
As of match played 26 July 2020.

Rank	Pos.	No.	Player	Premier League	FA Cup	League Cup	Total
1	DF	12	(France) Lucas Digne	7	0	1	8
2	DF	19	(France) Djibril Sidibé	4	0	1	5
3	FW	7	(Brazil) Richarlison	3	0	1	4
3	FW	11	(England) Theo Walcott	3	0	1	4
5	DF	2	(England) Mason Holgate	3	0	0	3
5	MF	10	(Iceland) Gylfi Sigurðsson	3	0	0	3
5	FW	14	(Turkey) Cenk Tosun	0	0	3	3
8	MF	20	(Brazil) Bernard	2	0	0	2
8	FW	27	(Italy) Moise Kean	2	0	0	2
10	FW	9	(England) Dominic Calvert-Lewin	1	0	0	1
10	DF	13	(Colombia) Yerry Mina	1	0	0	1
10	FW	17	(Nigeria) Alex Iwobi	0	0	1	1
10	MF	21	(Portugal) André Gomes	1	0	0	1
10	DF	23	(Republic of Ireland) Séamus Coleman	1	0	0	1
10	FW	42	(England) Anthony Gordon	1	0	0	1
Total				32	0	8	40

Source: Match reports in Competitions

=== Disciplinary record ===
As of match played 26 July 2020.

Rank	Position	Name	Premier League		FA Cup		League Cup		Total	
Rank	Position	Name	Booked	Sent off (straight red)	Booked	Sent off (straight red)	Booked	Sent off (straight red)	Booked	Sent off (straight red)
1	FW	(Brazil) Richarlison	8	0	0	0	1	0	9	0
1	FW	(England) Dominic Calvert-Lewin	9	0	0	0	0	0	9	0
3	MF	(England) Tom Davies	8	0	0	0	0	0	8	0
4	DF	(France) Lucas Digne	6	0	1	0	0	0	7	0
5	MF	(England) Fabian Delph	4	1	0	0	1	0	5	1
5	MF	(France) Morgan Schneiderlin	5	1	0	0	0	0	5	1
5	MF	(Portugal) André Gomes	6	0	0	0	0	0	6	0
8	DF	(Republic of Ireland) Séamus Coleman	4	1	0	0	0	0	4	1
8	DF	(England) Mason Holgate	5	0	0	0	0	0	5	0
10	MF	(Iceland) Gylfi Sigurðsson	3	0	0	0	1	0	4	0
11	GK	(England) Jordan Pickford	2	0	0	0	1	0	3	0
11	DF	(England) Michael Keane	3	0	0	0	0	0	3	0
11	DF	(Colombia) Yerry Mina	3	0	0	0	0	0	3	0
11	DF	(France) Djibril Sidibé	3	0	0	0	0	0	3	0
15	MF	(Brazil) Bernard	2	0	0	0	0	0	2	0
16	FW	(England) Theo Walcott	1	0	0	0	0	0	1	0
16	FW	(Italy) Moise Kean	1	0	0	0	0	0	1	0
Total			65	3	1	0	4	0	70	3

Source: Match reports in Competitions
