= Fraser Hornby =

Footballer (born 1999)

Personal information
- Full name: Fraser David Ingham Hornby
- Date of birth: 13 September 1999 (age 27)
- Place of birth: Northampton, England
- Height: 6 ft 5 in (1.95 m)
- Position: Forward

Team information
- Current team: VfL Wolfsburg
- Number: 10

Youth career
- 2014–2017: Everton

Senior career*
Years	Team	Apps	(Gls)
2017–2020	Everton	0	(0)
2019–2020	→ Kortrijk (loan)	12	(3)
2020–2023	Reims	11	(0)
2021	→ Aberdeen (loan)	10	(0)
2022–2023	→ Oostende (loan)	21	(8)
2023–2026	Darmstadt 98	60	(23)
2026–	VfL Wolfsburg	2	(0)

International career
2016	Scotland U17	7	(0)
2017–2018	Scotland U19	6	(2)
2018–2020	Scotland U21	18	(10)
- * Club domestic league appearances and goals as of 16 August 2026

Fraser David Ingham Hornby (born 13 September 1999) is a professional footballer who plays as a striker for German 2. Bundesliga club VfL Wolfsburg. Born in England, he has represented Scotland at youth level.

== Club career ==
Hornby joined Everton in September 2014, signing from Northampton Town for an initial fee of £65,500. On 6 December 2017, Hornby was named in Everton's first team squad for the Europa League match away to Apollon Limassol. A day later, he made his first-team debut, starting and playing 82 minutes in a 3–0 win.

Hornby was loaned to Belgian club Kortrijk in August 2019. On 25 September 2019, he scored his first goal for the club in a 3–1 win over RFC Seraing in the Belgian Cup.

On 1 July 2020, Hornby joined Ligue 1 side Reims for an undisclosed fee.

On 1 February 2021, Hornby joined Aberdeen on loan for the rest of the season.

On 28 July 2022, Hornby was loaned to Oostende in Belgium, with an option to buy.

On 5 July 2023, Hornby signed a four-year contract with German club Darmstadt 98, newly promoted to the top-tier Bundesliga.

On 1 June 2026, Hornby moved to VfL Wolfsburg on a four-season deal.

== International career ==
Hornby has played for Scotland at the under-17, under-19 and under-21 levels. He scored a hat-trick for the under-21 team in a 3–0 win against Andorra on 6 September 2018, and then scored both goals in a 2–1 win against the Netherlands on 11 September. By scoring a hat-trick against San Marino on 13 October 2020, Hornby became the record goalscorer for the Scotland under-21 team (with 10).

Selected for the Scotland under-21 squad in the 2018 Toulon Tournament, the team lost to Turkey in a penalty-out and finished fourth.

== Personal life ==
He is the younger brother of former Northampton Town midfielder Lewis Hornby.

== Career statistics ==
As of match played 16 August 2026

Appearances and goals by club, season and competition
Club	Season	League			National Cup		League Cup		Other		Total	
Club	Season	Division	Apps	Goals	Apps	Goals	Apps	Goals	Apps	Goals	Apps	Goals
Everton	2017–18	Premier League	0	0	0	0	0	0	1 (Note: Appearance(s) in UEFA Europa League)	0	1	0
Everton	2018–19	Premier League	0	0	0	0	0	0	0	0	0	0
Everton	2019–20	Premier League	0	0	0	0	0	0	0	0	0	0
Everton	Total		0	0	0	0	0	0	1	0	1	0
Kortrijk (loan)	2019–20	Belgian First Division A	12	3	2	1	0	0	0	0	14	4
Reims	2020–21	Ligue 1	3	0	0	0	0	0	0	0	3	0
Reims	2021–22	Ligue 1	8	0	2	1	0	0	1	0	11	1
Reims	Total		11	0	2	1	0	0	1	0	14	1
Aberdeen (loan)	2020–21	Scottish Premiership	9	0	1	0	0	0	0	0	10	0
KV Oostende	2022–23	Belgian Pro League	21	8	0	0	0	0	0	0	21	8
Darmstadt 98	2023–24	Bundesliga	7	0	1	0	0	0	0	0	8	0
Darmstadt 98	2024–25	2. Bundesliga	28	12	1	0	0	0	0	0	29	12
Darmstadt 98	2025–26	2. Bundesliga	25	11	2	2	0	0	0	0	27	13
Darmstadt 98	Total		60	23	4	2	0	0	1	0	64	25
VfL Wolfsburg	2026–27	2. Bundesliga	2	0	0	0	—		—		2	0
Career total			115	34	9	4	0	0	2	0	126	38

== Honours ==
Everton U23s

- Premier League Cup: 2018–19
