= Séamus Coleman =

Irish footballer (born 1988)

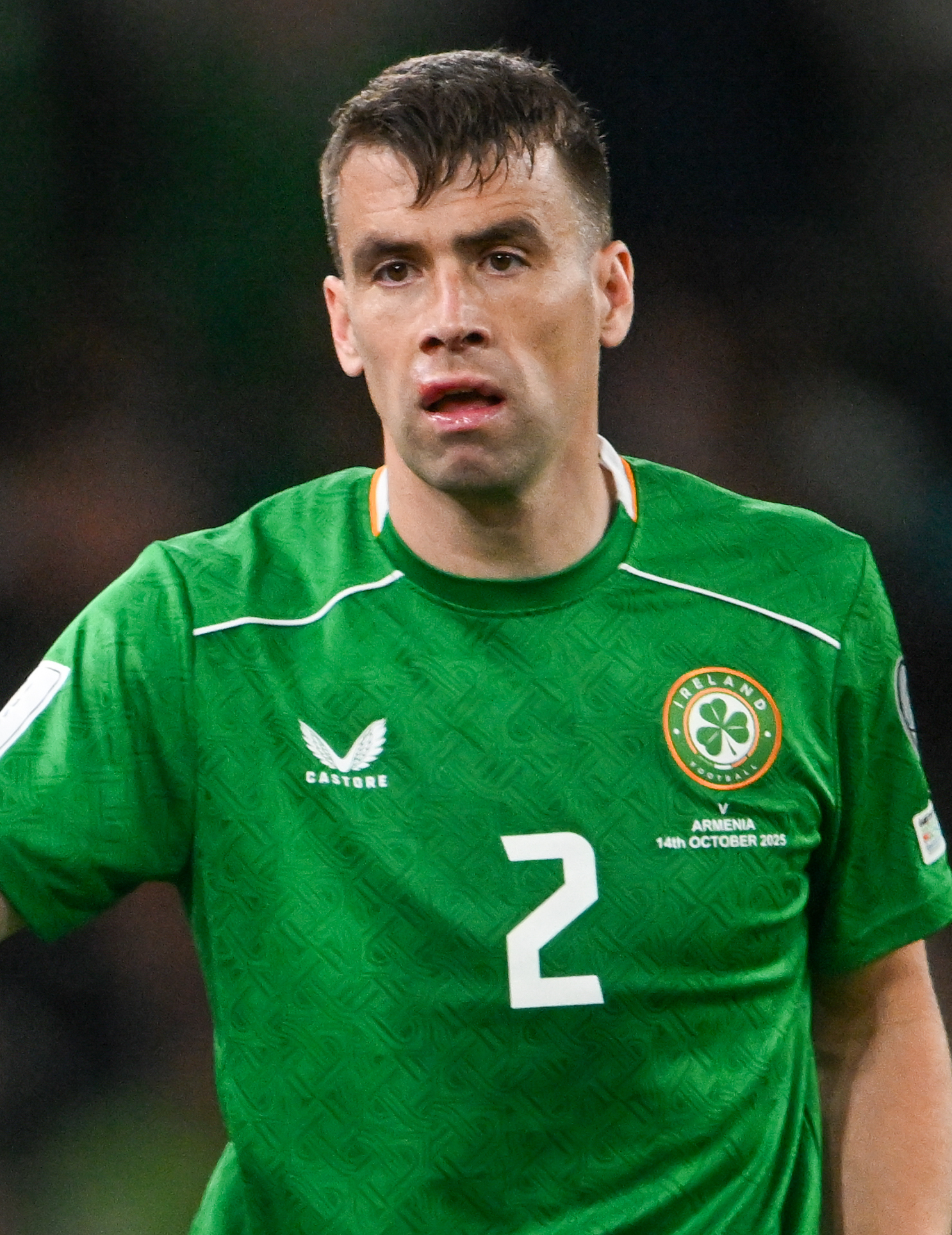
- Coleman with the Republic of Ireland in 2025

Personal information
- Full name: Séamus Coleman
- Date of birth: 11 October 1988 (age 38)
- Place of birth: Killybegs, Ireland
- Height: 1.77 m (5 ft 10 in)
- Position: Right-back

Youth career
- St Catherine's

Senior career*
Years	Team	Apps	(Gls)
2006–2009	Sligo Rovers	56	(1)
2009–2026	Everton	374	(22)
2010	→ Blackpool (loan)	9	(1)

International career^{‡}
2007–2010	Republic of Ireland U21	13	(1)
2011–	Republic of Ireland	81	(1)

Managerial career
- 2025: Everton (interim)
- * Club domestic league appearances and goals as of 19:13, 24 May 2026 (UTC) ‡ National team caps and goals as of 03:14, 6 June 2026 (UTC)

Séamus Coleman (/ˈʃeɪməs ˈkoʊlmən/ SHAY-məs KOHL-mən; born 11 October 1988) is an Irish professional footballer who plays as a right-back for the Republic of Ireland national team.

Originally a Gaelic footballer, Coleman started his association football career with St Catherine's in Killybegs. He joined League of Ireland side Sligo Rovers in 2006 after impressing in a friendly against them. He then made the move to England to sign for Everton in January 2009 for a £60,000 fee. In 2010, he spent half a season on loan with Blackpool, helping them win promotion via the Championship play-offs, before returning to Everton where he made over 400 appearances up until he departed the club in the summer of 2026.

Coleman has been a senior international for the Republic of Ireland since 2011, acquiring 81 caps. He won the 2011 Nations Cup and was awarded the FAI Under-21 International Player of the Year in both 2009 and 2010. He was selected for the Ireland squad at UEFA Euro 2016, captaining Ireland against both Italy and France. He was named the new Ireland captain in September 2016 following Robbie Keane's international retirement.

== Early life ==
Coleman was raised in Killybegs, a fishing port in County Donegal, Ireland. Two of his uncles played Gaelic football. His maternal aunt Anne (née Carr) came from Crove, a townland between Glengesh and Meenaneary, and is the mother of Dessie Farrell.

Coleman has two brothers: Francis and Stephen (known as Stevie). His parents are Henry and Máire Coleman. Henry is from Tinahely in County Wicklow, while Máire (née Carr) is from the townland of Crove (Irish: Cróibh) near Carrick, a village to the west of Killybegs. He attended St Catherine's Vocational School in Killybegs for his secondary education. He did his Leaving Certificate in 2006.

Coleman himself initially played Gaelic football, and, aged 16, played as a back for his local GAA club, Na Cealla Beaga. He also played for the Donegal county team at under-16 level, winning a Buncrana Cup in 2004.

== Club career ==
=== Sligo Rovers ===
Coleman was spotted by Sligo Rovers when he lined up against them in a friendly for his hometown club, St Catherine's. He made his League of Ireland debut against Derry City at the Brandywell in October 2006 as a substitute for Adam Hughes.

Sligo Rovers coach Rob McDonald did not rate Coleman very highly as a player, telling him that he should join League of Ireland First Division club Finn Harps. McDonald departed Sligo Rovers in March 2007, and was replaced by Paul Cook, of whom Coleman later said: "He made me feel like I was the best player in the League. It just makes such a difference when you have a manager who believes in you".

Coleman scored his only goal for Sligo against Bray Wanderers on 17 May 2008, concluding a 3–0 win.

=== Everton ===
Following a recommendation by Willie McStay to former teammate and Everton manager David Moyes, Coleman was signed by the Merseyside club for £60,000 in January 2009, ahead of other interest from Ipswich Town, Birmingham City and Celtic. Before playing a game for Everton, Coleman had to undergo surgery on a career-threatening infected blister. He made his debut on 22 October 2009 in the Europa League group stage in a 5–0 loss to Benfica at the Estádio da Luz, being beaten to the ball by Javier Saviola for the first goal. Three days later in his Goodison Park debut, a Premier League match against Tottenham Hotspur, Coleman was named Man of the Match after coming on as a first-half substitute for the injured Joseph Yobo, and played an instrumental part for both of Everton's goals in a 2–2 draw. He made his FA Cup debut against Carlisle United in the third round on 2 January 2010, replacing Tony Hibbert in the 80th minute and creating a goal for Tim Cahill two minutes later, in a 3–1 home win.

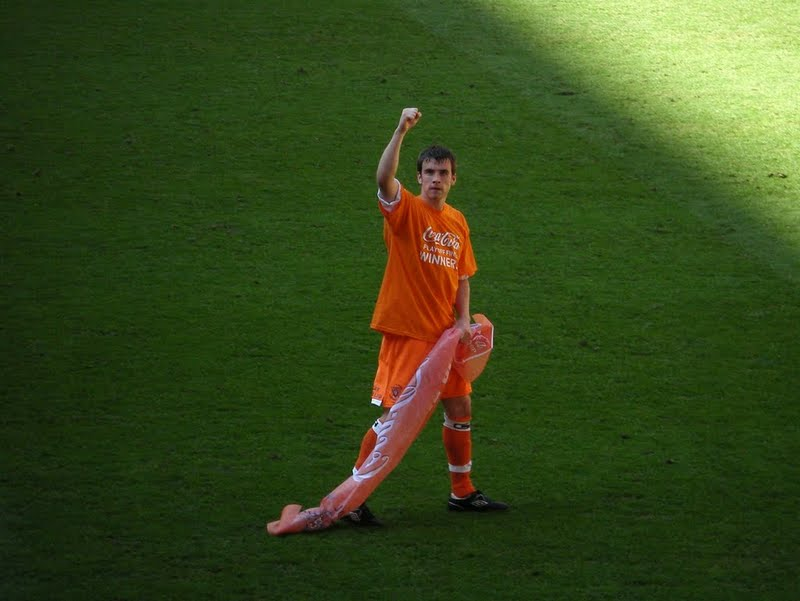
Coleman celebrating promotion with Blackpool in 2010

==== Loan to Blackpool ====
On 19 March 2010, Coleman joined Championship club Blackpool on loan, initially for one month as a replacement for the injured Neal Eardley. He made his debut the next day, in a 2–2 draw at home to Crystal Palace. He scored his first goal for the Tangerines in a 4–2 win at Scunthorpe United on 2 April. Later that month, Coleman's loan was extended until the end of the season, while on 19 May he agreed a new four-year contract with Everton. He played in Blackpool's play–off final at Wembley Stadium, which they won 3–2 against Cardiff City.

==== Return from loan ====
Coleman returned to Everton for the following season, breaking into the first team on the right of midfield. He scored his first goal for Everton against Brentford in the League Cup third round on 21 September 2010. He opened the scoring at Griffin Park in the sixth minute, but also gave away a penalty with a foul on Myles Weston, which Ján Mucha saved from Charlie MacDonald, although Brentford eventually won in a penalty shoot-out after a 1–1 draw. He scored his first Premier League goal against his former team Blackpool on 6 November to secure a 2–2 draw at Bloomfield Road, signed a new four-and-a-half-year deal two months later, and was nominated for the 2011 PFA Young Player of the Year Award. He finished the season having scored four league goals, though was sent off in the final game of the season, a 1–0 win against Chelsea.

==== 2012–2017 ====
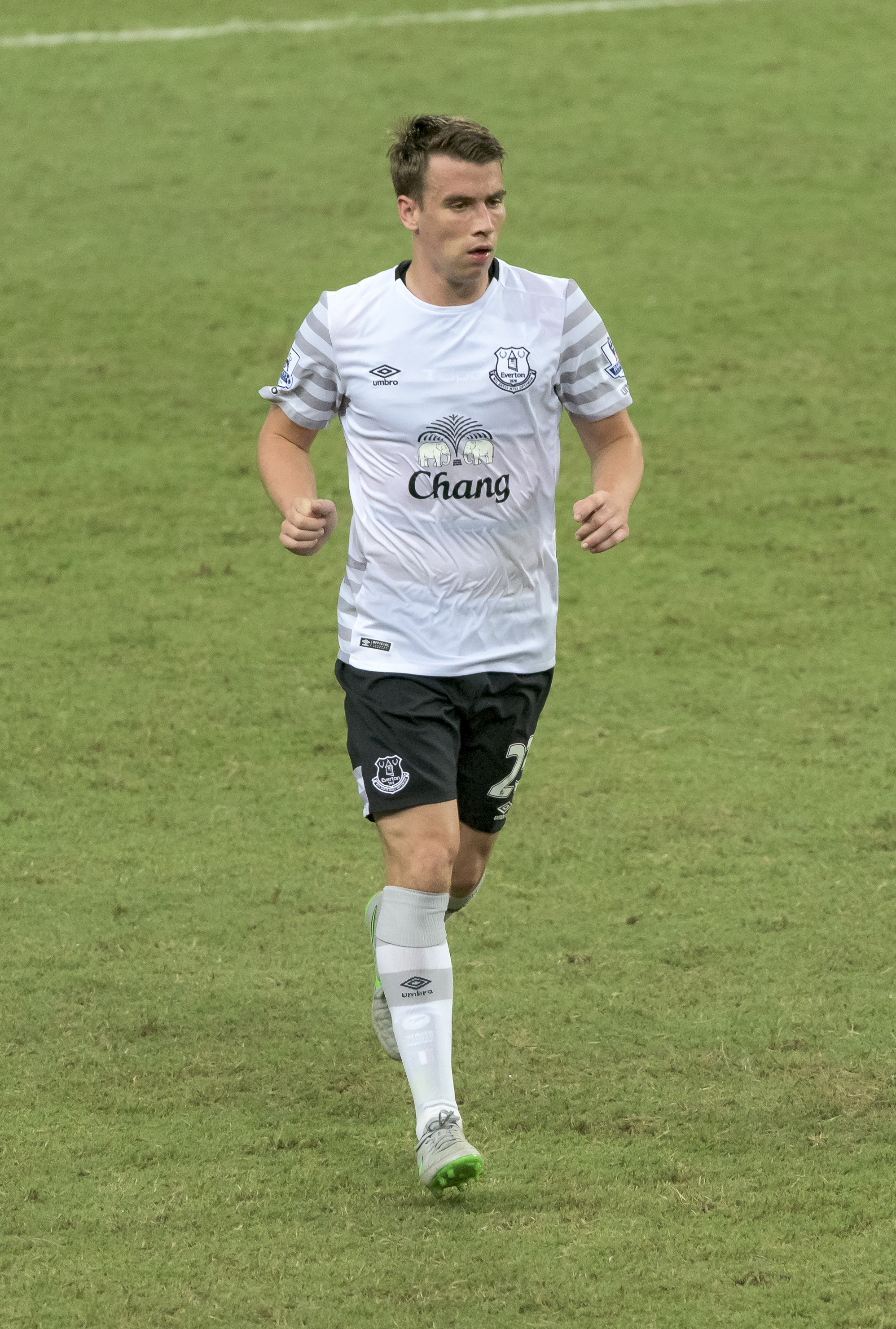
Coleman playing for Everton in 2015

On 31 December 2012, Coleman signed a new five-and-a-half-year contract with Everton.

The 2013–14 season saw some of Coleman's best performances to date as he scored six league goals, more than his previous seasons at the club combined. In April 2014, he was named in the PFA Team of the Year. He was also named Everton's Player of the Year and Players' Player of the Year. Manager Roberto Martínez hailed Coleman as one of the best full-backs in world football as he was part of a defence which conceded just 39 goals to help Everton finish fifth with a club record of 72 Premier League points. He created 45 chances during the season, the third highest amongst Everton players and had the second highest pass completion at 88%.

On 26 June 2014, Coleman signed a new five-year contract with Everton. He scored his first ever goal in European football for Everton on 18 September, netting their second in a 4–1 win over VfL Wolfsburg in the first match of their Europa League campaign. On 19 February 2015, he was again on target in Europe, in a 5–1 win over Young Boys in the last 32. On 22 March, Coleman scored the first goal in an eventual 3–1 away success against Queens Park Rangers (QPR) with then-Everton manager Roberto Martínezpraising the player for his performance, describing him as "magnificent in his defensive duties" and labelling his opener as "a striker's goal".

Coleman scored his only goal of the 2015–16 season in a 3–0 away victory against Stoke City on 6 February 2016.

On 17 September, Coleman opened his goalscoring account for the 2016–17 season in a 3–1 home win against Middlesbrough with a long run and finish on his weaker foot. He scored his second goal of the season on 19 November with an 89th-minute header to win in a 2–1 home win against Swansea City. His first goal of 2017 was the only one in an away win against Crystal Palace at Selhurst Park on 21 January.

==== 2017–2026 ====
Coleman suffered a fractured tibia and fibula in his right leg following a dangerous challenge from Welsh left-back Neil Taylor whilst on international duty with Ireland in March 2017 and was unlikely to return to action until 2018. It was announced a few days after his injury that FIFA would pay his basic salary for the duration of his rehabilitation. During his recovery, Coleman signed a new five-year contract which would keep him at the club until the summer of 2022. He made his Everton return on 31 January 2018, in a 2–1 win over Leicester City.

Coleman was appointed as Everton's new captain in August 2019, following Phil Jagielka's departure from the club. Later that year, on 15 December, he made his 300th Everton appearance in a 1–1 draw against Manchester United.

On 28 July 2021, Coleman signed a two-year contract extension to keep him at Everton until the end of June 2023.

Coleman played his 400th game for the club in a 2–0 defeat against Liverpool on 13 February 2023. Six days later, he scored the only goal at home to Leeds United. Despite suffering a serious injury in a clash with Leicester midfielder Boubakary Soumare in a 2–2 draw towards the end of the 2022–23 season, on 29 June 2023, Everton extended Coleman's contract by one year.

Coleman made his first appearance of the 2023–24 season on 9 December 2023, starting in Everton's 3–0 home win over Newcastle United. On 17 May 2024, the club announced he had been offered a one-year contract. Coleman signed the contract, extending his contract at Everton to the end of June 2025.

On 9 January 2025, following the sacking of manager Sean Dyche, Coleman and former teammate Leighton Baines were made joint interim managers of the team ahead of that night's FA Cup tie at home to Peterborough United. Coleman started and captained Everton in their final game at Goodison Park on 18 May. He was substituted with a knock in the 18th minute, and was given a standing ovation by the crowd as he left the pitch.

Nearing the expiration of his contract, Everton announced that Coleman had signed a new one-year deal on 27 June 2025, keeping him with the club until the end of the 2025–26 season. On 15 May 2026, Coleman announced that he would leave Everton after 17 years when his contract would expire in the summer. He was offered a coaching position by the club, but as of 11 October, he has yet to make a decision. In his final appearances for the club, Coleman overtook Dixie Dean to enter the top 10 appearance makers for Everton in all competitions.

== International career ==
Coleman is a former Ireland under-21 and under-23 international, having made his debut for the former against Sweden in 2007. On 10 August 2010, Coleman scored his first international goal in a 5–0 win against Estonia. In the same month he won the 2009 FAI Under 21 Player of the Year Award. He retained the award in 2010. He captained Ireland in a 1–0 defeat against Turkey in November 2010.

=== Senior ===
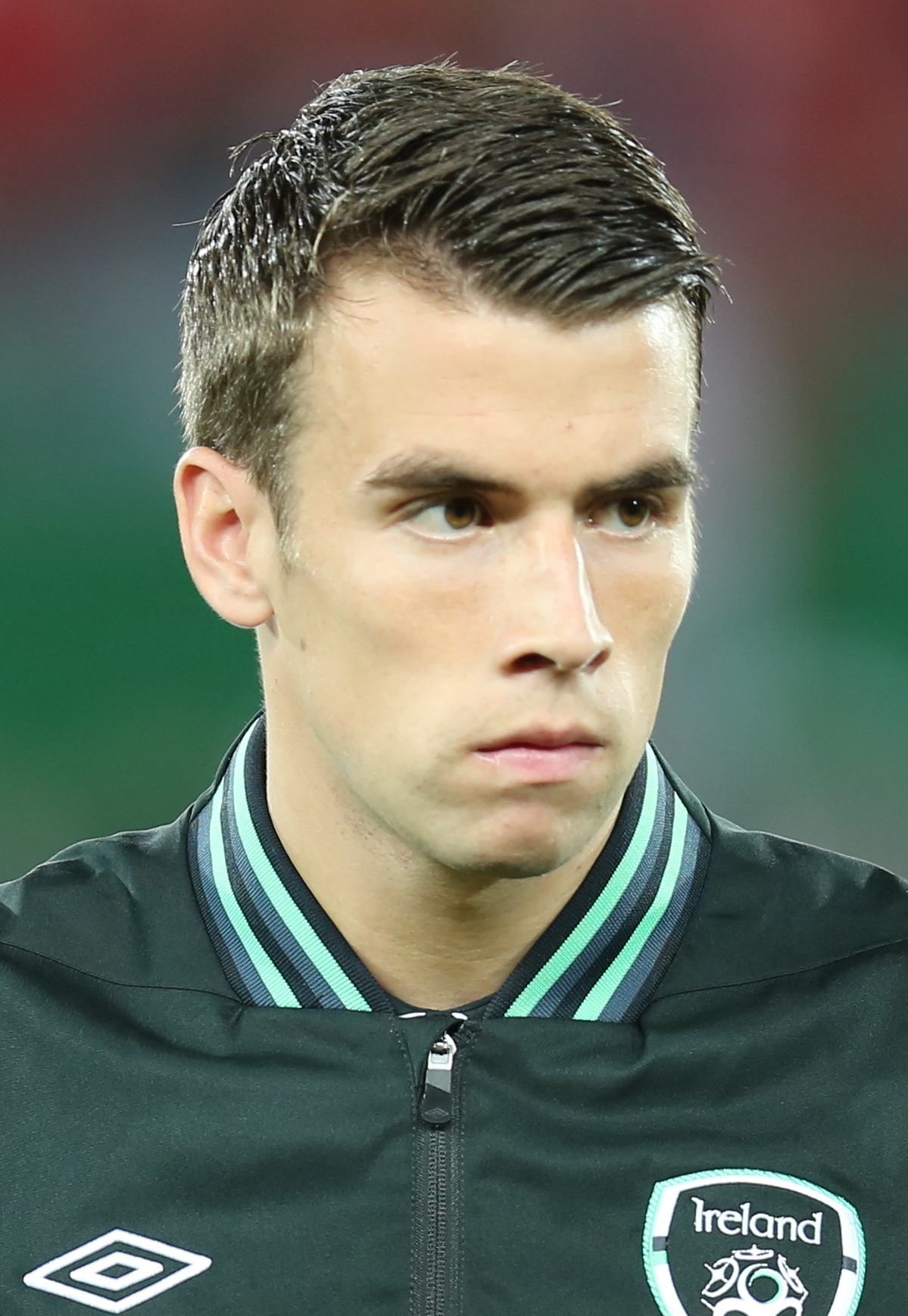
Coleman lining up for the Republic of Ireland in 2013

Coleman received his first senior call-up to the Republic of Ireland squad in October 2010, and made his full international debut in the country's inaugural Nations Cup match against Wales on 8 February 2011, which Ireland won 3–0. The Republic won the tournament after defeating Northern Ireland and Scotland in their other games.

On 29 May 2013, Coleman was named Man of the Match for his performance against England at Wembley Stadium. He crossed the ball for Shane Long's opening goal of the game, a header past Joe Hart. Coleman captained Ireland for the first time in a 2014 World Cup qualifier against Germany on 11 October 2013, his 25th birthday, which Ireland lost 3–0 in Cologne.

On 31 May 2016, Coleman was selected in Martin O'Neill's 23-man squad for Euro 2016. At the tournament, he captained Ireland in their final group game victory over Italy. The 1–0 win ensured that the team advanced past the group stages at a UEFA European Championship for the first time. He was also captain for Ireland's round-of-16 match against France in Lyon where the latter prevailed 2–1 winners on home soil.

Coleman was officially named the new Ireland captain in September 2016 following the international retirement of Robbie Keane. The following month, he scored his first senior international goal for Ireland in a 1–0 win over Georgia at the Aviva Stadium in a 2018 World Cup qualifier.

On 24 March 2017, Coleman suffered a broken leg in the 69th minute of a goalless draw in a World Cup qualifier against Wales following a dangerous tackle by Neil Taylor for which the left-back was given a straight red card. Coleman received treatment on the pitch and was given oxygen as he was comforted by teammate and compatriot Shane Long before being carried off on a stretcher. He was brought directly to Dublin's St. Vincent's Hospital where he underwent surgery on a fractured tibia and fibula of his right leg. Ireland manager Martin O'Neill stated that Coleman's injury was a "huge blow" to both Ireland and Everton but backed the player to return to his "brilliant" best. Taylor's challenge was widely condemned across the football world with the then-Aston Villa player himself said to be "devastated" about causing a serious injury. Welsh manager Chris Coleman later revealed that Taylor went into the Ireland team's changing room to apologise for the incident. Many fellow footballers, sports personalities and celebrities took to Twitter (now X) to send messages of support to Coleman including Wayne Rooney, Shay Given, Héctor Bellerín, Paul McGrath, Tony Bellew and Niall Horan. On 26 March, two days after the incident, O'Neill confirmed that Coleman had a successful surgery on his fractured leg.

Coleman's first call-up since the injury came for the squad to face Turkey on 23 March 2018.

== Managerial career ==
After manager Sean Dyche was sacked by Everton in early January 2025, Coleman became the club's first-team interim manager, alongside former Everton teammate Leighton Baines. Baines and Coleman's only game in charge was a 2–0 win at home to Peterborough United in the FA Cup.

== Style of play ==
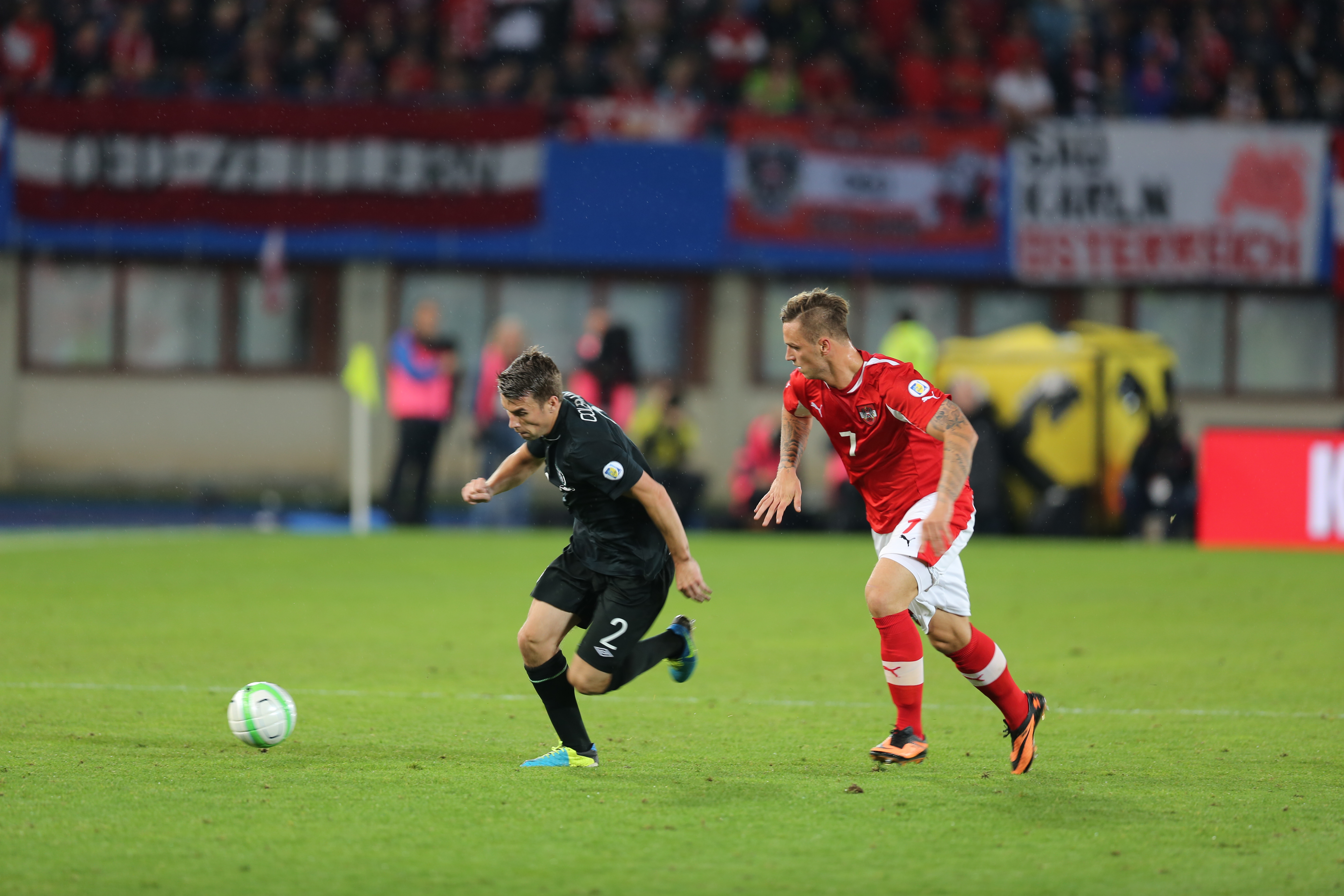
Coleman running with the ball in a World Cup qualifying match against Austria in September 2013

In his prime years, Coleman was a quick and hard-working full-back with stamina and was renowned for his eagerness to get forward on attacking runs which established his goalscoring prowess. He had been deployed as a winger and wide midfielder before making the right-back spot his own. Coleman showed a proficiency for having good composure when in possession of the ball and Coleman's former Everton teammate Ashley Williams hailed him as one of the best players he had ever played with.

Despite being very quiet by nature, Coleman has always shown great leadership qualities which propelled him to the role of captain of the Irish national team. He led the Ireland team out for their final two matches at Euro 2016, earning much praise from teammates, fans and media alike. He took on the role of Ireland captain on a permanent basis in September 2016. In March 2018, it was suggested by ESPN FC journalist Luke O'Farrell that Coleman should also be the next club captain at Everton, highlighting that the full-back "leads by example and, more importantly, demands more from his teammates. Coleman has never been afraid to let another player know when something is not working or needs improvement. [...] Coleman sets the mark for the rest of the team to follow". O'Farrell's wish came to fruition in August 2019 when Coleman became the new Everton captain following the departure of Phil Jagielka.

== Personal life ==
Coleman supports the Donegal county football team. He also still follows his local GAA team, Na Cealla Beaga, and attended the final of the 2013 Donegal Senior Football Championship when they lost to Gleann tSuilí.

I'd be more nervous watching the [Gaelic football] lads than I would be watching my own games… When it's Killybegs playing, it means a bit more. It's something I was a big part of growing up, I played with all them lads.

In an Everton matchday programme ahead of a Premier League win over Wolverhampton Wanderers, Coleman mentioned Michael Murphy as his favourite sportsperson outside association football, both for his manner on the field of play and his personality off it.

In June 2015, Coleman married his childhood sweetheart Rachel Cunningham in St. Mary of the Visitation Church in his hometown of Killybegs. They have two daughters, one born in 2016 and another born in 2018, and a son who was born in 2021.

== Career statistics ==
=== Club ===
As of match played 24 May 2026

Appearances and goals by club, season and competition
Club	Season	League			National Cup (Note: Includes FAI Cup and FA Cup)		League Cup (Note: Includes League of Ireland Cup and EFL Cup)		Other		Total	
Club	Season	Division	Apps	Goals	Apps	Goals	Apps	Goals	Apps	Goals	Apps	Goals
Sligo Rovers	2006	League of Ireland Premier Division	4	0	0	0	0	0	—		4	0
Sligo Rovers	2007	League of Ireland Premier Division	26	0	3	0	0	0	—		29	0
Sligo Rovers	2008	League of Ireland Premier Division	26	1	1	0	1	0	—		28	1
Sligo Rovers	Total		56	1	4	0	1	0	0	0	61	1
Everton	2009–10	Premier League	3	0	1	0	0	0	3 (Note: Appearances in UEFA Europa League)	0	7	0
Everton	2010–11	Premier League	34	4	4	1	2	1	—		40	6
Everton	2011–12	Premier League	18	0	4	0	2	0	—		24	0
Everton	2012–13	Premier League	26	0	3	1	2	0	—		31	1
Everton	2013–14	Premier League	36	6	3	1	2	0	—		41	7
Everton	2014–15	Premier League	35	3	2	0	0	0	5	2	42	5
Everton	2015–16	Premier League	28	1	3	0	3	0	—		34	1
Everton	2016–17	Premier League	26	4	1	0	1	0	—		28	4
Everton	2017–18	Premier League	12	0	0	0	0	0	0	0	12	0
Everton	2018–19	Premier League	29	2	1	0	0	0	—		30	2
Everton	2019–20	Premier League	27	0	1	0	2	0	—		30	0
Everton	2020–21	Premier League	25	0	4	0	2	0	—		31	0
Everton	2021–22	Premier League	30	1	4	0	0	0	—		34	1
Everton	2022–23	Premier League	23	1	1	0	1	0	—		25	1
Everton	2023–24	Premier League	12	0	1	0	0	0	—		13	0
Everton	2024–25	Premier League	5	0	0	0	1	0	—		6	0
Everton	2025–26	Premier League	5	0	0	0	2	0	–		7	0
Everton	Total		374	22	33	3	20	1	8	2	435	28
Blackpool (loan)	2009–10	Championship	9	1	—		—		3 (Note: Appearances in Championship play-offs)	0	12	1
Career total			439	24	37	3	21	1	11	2	508	30

=== International ===
As of match played 5 June 2026

Appearances and goals by national team and year
National team	Year	Apps	Goals
Republic of Ireland	2011	4	0
Republic of Ireland	2012	5	0
Republic of Ireland	2013	11	0
Republic of Ireland	2014	5	0
Republic of Ireland	2015	7	0
Republic of Ireland	2016	10	1
Republic of Ireland	2017	1	0
Republic of Ireland	2018	6	0
Republic of Ireland	2019	7	0
Republic of Ireland	2020	0	0
Republic of Ireland	2021	7	0
Republic of Ireland	2022	4	0
Republic of Ireland	2023	1	0
Republic of Ireland	2024	5	0
Republic of Ireland	2025	4	0
Republic of Ireland	2026	4	0
Total		81	1

As of match played 5 June 2026. Republic of Ireland score listed first, score column indicates score after each Coleman goal.

International goals by date, venue, cap, opponent, score, result and competition
No.	Date	Venue	Cap	Opponent	Score	Result	Competition	Ref.
1	6 October 2016	Aviva Stadium, Dublin, Ireland	40	Georgia	1–0	1–0	2018 FIFA World Cup qualification	

== Managerial statistics ==
As of match played 9 January 2025

Managerial record by team and tenure
Team	From	To	Record							
Team	From	To	G	W	D	L	GF	GA	GD	Win %
Everton (player-joint interim manager)	9 January 2025	11 January 2025	1	1	0	0	2	0	+2	100.00
Total			1	1	0	0	2	0	+2	100.00

== Honours ==
Blackpool

- Football League Championship play-offs: 2010

Republic of Ireland

- Nations Cup: 2011

Individual

- Donegal Sports Star Professional Sport Achievement Award: 2009
- FAI Under-21 International Player of the Year: 2009, 2010
- PFA Team of the Year: 2013–14 Premier League
- Everton Player's Player of the Year: 2013–14
- Everton Supporter's Player of the Year: 2013–14
- Howard Kendall Award: 2026
