= João Virgínia =

Portuguese footballer (born 1999)

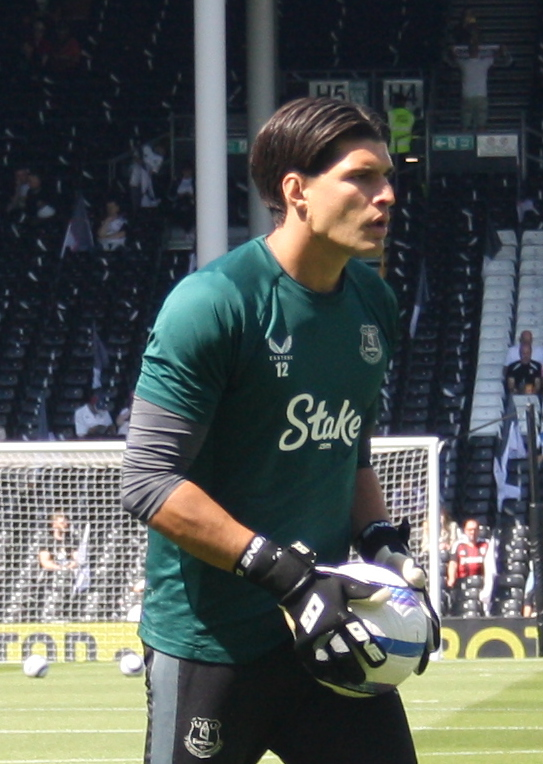
- Virgínia in 2025

Personal information
- Full name: João Manuel Neves Virgínia
- Date of birth: 10 October 1999 (age 27)
- Place of birth: Faro, Portugal
- Height: 1.91 m (6 ft 3 in)
- Position: Goalkeeper

Team information
- Current team: Wolverhampton Wanderers
- Number: 13

Youth career
- 2011–2015: Benfica
- 2015–2018: Arsenal
- 2018–2019: Everton

Senior career*
Years	Team	Apps	(Gls)
2019–2025	Everton	1	(0)
2019–2020	→ Reading (loan)	2	(0)
2021–2022	→ Sporting CP (loan)	1	(0)
2022–2023	→ Cambuur (loan)	17	(0)
2025–2026	Sporting CP	2	(0)
2026–	Wolverhampton Wanderers	1	(0)

International career
2015	Portugal U16	3	(0)
2015–2016	Portugal U17	3	(0)
2017	Portugal U18	3	(0)
2017–2018	Portugal U19	9	(0)
2017–2019	Portugal U20	9	(0)
2018–2021	Portugal U21	2	(0)
Medal record
Men's football
Representing Portugal
UEFA European Under-21 Championship
Runner-up	2021 Hungary–Slovenia
UEFA European Under-19 Championship
Winner	2018 Finland
- * Club domestic league appearances and goals as of 18:55, 6 November 2025 (UTC)

João Manuel Neves Virgínia (born 10 October 1999) is a Portuguese professional footballer who plays as a goalkeeper for EFL Championship club Wolverhampton Wanderers.

== Club career ==
Born in Faro on the Algarve, Virgínia began his youth career at Benfica. In August 2015, he agreed a transfer to Arsenal amidst interest from Manchester United, effective from his 16th birthday in October. In August 2018, he signed a three-year deal at Everton.

On 11 July 2019, Virgínia joined Reading on a season-long loan deal. Everton recalled him early due to a lack of playing time, on 5 January 2020.

Virgínia played his first professional game for Everton on 16 September 2020, in a 3–0 home win in the EFL Cup match against League Two side Salford City. Days later, he extended his contract to June 2024. On 13 March 2021, he made his Premier League debut as a substitute for the injured Jordan Pickford in a 1–2 home defeat to Burnley. Eight days later, he made his FA Cup debut, starting in a 0–2 quarter-final defeat to Manchester City at Goodison Park.

On 25 August 2021, Virgínia returned to Lisbon, joining Sporting CP on a season-long loan. Kept aside in the Primeira Liga by Antonio Adán, he made his debut on 15 October in the third round of the Taça de Portugal in a 4–0 win at Belenenses. He made his European debut on 7 December in the final game of the UEFA Champions League group stage, a 4–2 loss at Ajax that saw both teams through to the last 16. His sole league appearance was on the final day, playing the first 79 minutes of a 4–0 final day win over Santa Clara at the Estádio José Alvalade before being replaced by André Paulo; Sporting declined the option to make his transfer permanent for €5 million.

On 8 July 2022, Virgínia joined Cambuur of the Dutch Eredivisie on a season-long loan. He made his debut on 6 August as the season began with a 2–0 loss at home to newly promoted Excelsior. He was sent off on 11 January 2023 in the second round of the KNVB Cup, a 1–0 loss at amateur Tweede Divisie team De Treffers; defender Doke Schmidt ended the game in goal as no substitutions remained. The card was rescinded, the third time in four occasions that one given by referee Joey Kooij was overturned.

On 20 May 2025, Everton announced the departure of Virgínia at the expiry of his contract in June. On 25 July, he returned to Sporting CP on a free transfer and a three-year deal.

== International career ==
Across all age groups, Virgínia earned 29 caps for Portugal at youth level, starting with a 1–0 win for the under-16s over the Netherlands in Vila Real de Santo António on 14 February 2015. On 12 November 2016, having just turned 17, he made his under-20 debut in a 1–1 friendly draw with Morocco in Rabat.

Virgínia represented the under-19 team that won the 2018 UEFA European Championship in Finland, defeating Italy 4–3 in the final. He also played in a group-stage elimination for the under-20 team in Poland at the 2019 FIFA World Cup.

== Career statistics ==
As of match played 18 December 2025

Appearances and goals by club, season and competition
Club	Season	League			National cup (Note: Includes FA Cup, Taça de Portugal, KNVB Cup)		League cup (Note: Includes EFL Cup, Taça da Liga)		Other		Total	
Club	Season	Division	Apps	Goals	Apps	Goals	Apps	Goals	Apps	Goals	Apps	Goals
Everton U23	2018–19	—			—		—		1 (Note: Appearance in EFL Trophy)	0	1	0
Everton	2018–19	Premier League	0	0	0	0	0	0	—		0	0
Everton	2019–20	Premier League	0	0	—		—		—		0	0
Everton	2020–21	Premier League	1	0	1	0	1	0	—		3	0
Everton	2023–24	Premier League	0	0	3	0	0	0	—		3	0
Everton	2024–25	Premier League	0	0	1	0	1	0	—		2	0
Everton	Total		1	0	5	0	2	0	—		8	0
Reading (loan)	2019–20	Championship	2	0	0	0	1	0	—		3	0
Sporting CP (loan)	2021–22	Primeira Liga	1	0	4	0	2	0	1 (Note: Appearances in UEFA Champions League)	0	8	0
Cambuur (loan)	2022–23	Eredivisie	17	0	1	0	—		—		18	0
Sporting CP	2025–26	Primeira Liga	2	0	3	0	1	0	1	0	7	0
Career total			23	0	13	0	6	0	3	0	45	0

== Honours ==
Everton U23s

- Premier League Cup: 2018–19

Sporting CP

- Taça da Liga: 2021–22

Individual

- Eredivisie Team of the Month: November 2022,
