= Jake Dunwoody =

Northern Irish footballer (born 1998)

Personal information
- Full name: Jake Dunwoody
- Date of birth: 28 September 1998 (age 28)
- Place of birth: Glossop, England
- Position: Midfielder

Youth career
- Manchester City
- –2016: Stoke City

Senior career*
Years	Team	Apps	(Gls)
2016–2020	Stoke City	0	(0)
2016	→ Leek Town (loan)		
2018	→ Curzon Ashton (loan)	16	(3)
2020	Derry City	6	(0)
2021	HIFK	26	(1)
2022–2023	SJK	50	(5)
2024	AC Oulu	25	(1)
2025	Hyde United	1	(0)

International career^{‡}
2017–2020	Northern Ireland U21	15	(1)
- * Club domestic league appearances and goals as of 14:24, 28 January 2026 (UTC) ‡ National team caps and goals as of 11:13, 4 March 2021 (UTC)

Jake Dunwoody (born 28 September 1998) is a professional footballer who plays as a midfielder. Born in England, he has represented Northern Ireland at under-21 level.

== Club career ==
Born in Glossop, Dunwoody joined the youth academy of Stoke City at the age of 16 from the youth academy of Manchester City. In 2016, he was sent on loan to Leek Town in the English non-leagues. He was recalled from his loan in November 2016. Before the second half of 2017/18, he was sent on loan to National League North side Curzon Ashton. He was released by Stoke at the end of the 2019–20 season.

In 2020, Dunwoody signed for Derry City.

=== Finland ===
Before the 2021 season, he signed for Finnish team HIFK.

In November 2021, Dunwoody signed for fellow Veikkausliiga side SJK.

In the early November 2023, it was reported that Dunwoody will transfer to fellow Veikkausliiga club AC Oulu. On 9 November 2023, AC Oulu confirmed his signing on a one-year deal with an option for an additional year.

=== Return to England ===
In September 2025, Dunwoody returned to England, joining Northern Premier League Premier Division club Hyde United.

== International career ==
Dunwoody made 15 appearances for the Northern Ireland national under-21 football team, scoring once.

== Career statistics ==
As of 23 October 2024.

Appearances and goals by club, season and competition
Club	Season	League			Cup (Note: Includes Suomen Cup)		League cup (Note: Includes Finnish League Cup)		Europe		Total	
Club	Season	Division	Apps	Goals	Apps	Goals	Apps	Goals	Apps	Goals	Apps	Goals
Curzon Ashton (loan)	2017–18	National League North	16	3	–		–		–		16	3
Derry City	2020	LOI Division	6	0	1	0	0	0	1 (Note: Appearance(s) in UEFA Europa League)	0	8	0
HIFK	2021	Veikkausliiga	26	1	5	0	–		–		31	1
SJK	2022	Veikkausliiga	25	0	2	0	5	1	4 (Note: Appearances in UEFA Conference League)	0	36	1
SJK	2023	Veikkausliiga	25	5	1	1	3	0	–		29	6
SJK	Total		50	5	3	1	8	1	4	0	65	7
AC Oulu	2024	Veikkausliiga	25	1	5	2	0	0	–		30	3
Career total			123	10	14	3	8	1	5	0	150	14
