= 2018–19 Everton F.C. season =

English football club season

Everton
2018–19 season
- Chairman: Bill Kenwright
- Manager: Marco Silva
- Stadium: Goodison Park
- Premier League: 8th
- FA Cup: Fourth Round
- EFL Cup: Third Round
- Top goalscorer: League: Gylfi Sigurðsson; Richarlison (13); All: Gylfi Sigurðsson; Richarlison (14)
- Highest home attendance: League/All: 39,395 (21 Apr 2019 v Man. United, PL)
- Lowest home attendance: League: 38,113 (13 Jan 2019 v Bournemouth); All: 30,545 (2 October 2018 v Southampton, EFL Cup)
- Biggest win: 5–1 (26 Dec 2018 v Burnley, PL)
- Biggest defeat: 2–6 (23 Dec 2018 v Tottenham Hotspur, PL)
Home colours	Away colours	Third colours

The 2018–19 season was Everton's 65th consecutive season in the top flight of English football and their 141st year in existence. They participated in the Premier League, FA Cup and EFL Cup.

The season covers the period from 1 July 2018 to 30 June 2019.

== Kits ==
Home	Home Alt.	Home Alt. 2	Home Alt. 3

Away	Third	Third Alt.

== Transfers ==
=== Transfers in ===
Date from	Position	Nationality	Name	From	Fee	Ref.
24 July 2018	LW	(Brazil)	Richarlison	(England) Watford	£35,000,000 (Note: Fee may eventually rise to £50,000,000.)	
1 August 2018	LB	(France)	Lucas Digne	(Spain) Barcelona	£18,000,000	
3 August 2018	GK	(Portugal)	João Virgínia	(England) Arsenal	Undisclosed	
9 August 2018	LW	(Brazil)	Bernard	(Ukraine) Shakhtar Donetsk	Free	
9 August 2018	CB	(Colombia)	Yerry Mina	(Spain) Barcelona	£27,200,000	

=== Loans in ===
Start Date	Position	Nationality	Name	From	End Date	Ref.
9 August 2018	CM	(Portugal)	André Gomes	(Spain) Barcelona	31 May 2019	
10 August 2018	CB	(France)	Kurt Zouma	(England) Chelsea	31 May 2019	

=== Transfers out ===
Date from	Position	Nationality	Name	To	Fee	Ref.
21 June 2018	CB	(Argentina)	Ramiro Funes Mori	(Spain) Villarreal	£8,100,000	
1 July 2018	MF	(England)	Charlie Ball	Free agent	Released	
1 July 2018	AM	(England)	Jose Baxter	(England) Oldham Athletic	Free	
1 July 2018	RB	(England)	Nathan Baxter	Free agent	Released	
1 July 2018	FW	(Republic of Ireland)	Sam Byrne	(Republic of Ireland) Dundalk	Released	
1 July 2018	RB	(England)	Jordan Corke	Free agent	Released	
1 July 2018	RM	(Guyana)	Stephen Duke-McKenna	(England) Bolton Wanderers	Free	
1 July 2018	FW	(England)	Calum Dyson	(England) Plymouth Argyle	Free	
1 July 2018	CM	(England)	Conor Grant	(England) Plymouth Argyle	Free	
1 July 2018	GK	(Wales)	Louis Gray	(England) Nuneaton Town	Free	
1 July 2018	LW	(Belgium)	David Henen	Free agent	Released	
1 July 2018	GK	(England)	Matthew Johnson	Free agent	Released	
1 July 2018	CM	(England)	Sid Kerr	Free agent	Released	
1 July 2018	LB	(England)	Nathan Moore	Free agent	Released	
1 July 2018	GK	(Republic of Ireland)	Tom Murphy	Free agent	Released	
1 July 2018	GK	(Spain)	Joel Robles	(Spain) Real Betis	Free	
1 July 2018	DM	(England)	Tom Scully	(England) Norwich City	Free	
10 July 2018	SS	(England)	Wayne Rooney	(United States) D.C. United	Free	
27 July 2018	AM	(Netherlands)	Davy Klaassen	(Germany) Werder Bremen	£12,000,000	
20 February 2019	CB	(England) (China)	Tyias Browning	(China) Guangzhou Evergrande Taobao	Undisclosed	

=== Loans out ===
Start Date	Position	Nationality	Name	To	End Date	Ref.
2 July 2018	LB	(England)	Luke Garbutt	(England) Oxford United	31 May 2019	
12 July 2018	LW	(Nigeria)	Henry Onyekuru	(Turkey) Galatasaray	31 May 2019	
19 July 2018	SS	(Switzerland)	Shani Tarashaj	(Switzerland) Grasshopper Club Zürich	31 May 2019	
2 August 2018	CB	(Wales)	Ashley Williams	(England) Stoke City	31 May 2019	
3 August 2018	LB	(United States)	Antonee Robinson	(England) Wigan Athletic	31 May 2019	
4 August 2018	RW	(Belgium)	Kevin Mirallas	(Italy) Fiorentina	31 May 2019	
9 August 2018	DM	(England)	Callum Connolly	(England) Wigan Athletic	31 January 2019	
15 August 2018	AM	(Croatia)	Nikola Vlašić	(Russia) CSKA Moscow	31 May 2019	
17 August 2018	RB	(Curaçao)	Cuco Martina	(England) Stoke City	31 January 2019	
23 August 2018	DM	(Bosnia and Herzegovina)	Muhamed Bešić	(England) Middlesbrough	31 May 2019	
23 August 2018	CM	(England)	Joe Williams	(England) Bolton Wanderers	31 May 2019	
25 August 2018	LW	(Democratic Republic of the Congo)	Yannick Bolasie	(England) Aston Villa	21 January 2019	
30 August 2018	CF	(Spain)	Sandro	(Spain) Real Sociedad	31 May 2019	
31 August 2018	CB	(England)	Matthew Pennington	(England) Ipswich Town	31 May 2019	
1 January 2019	CB	(England)	Mason Holgate	(England) West Bromwich Albion	31 May 2019	
2 January 2019	AM	(England)	Kieran Dowell	(England) Sheffield United	31 May 2019	
4 January 2019	CF	(Northern Ireland)	Shayne Lavery	(Scotland) Falkirk	31 May 2019	
12 January 2019	GK	(England)	Joe Hilton	(England) Marine	31 May 2019	
18 January 2019	CF	(Senegal)	Oumar Niasse	(Wales) Cardiff City	31 May 2019	
31 January 2019	CM	(Democratic Republic of the Congo)	Beni Baningime	(England) Wigan Athletic	31 May 2019	
31 January 2019	LW	(Democratic Republic of the Congo)	Yannick Bolasie	(Belgium) Anderlecht	31 May 2019	
31 January 2019	DM	(England)	Callum Connolly	(England) Bolton Wanderers	31 May 2019	
31 January 2019	AM	(England)	Antony Evans	(England) Blackpool	31 May 2019	
31 January 2019	RB	(Curaçao)	Cuco Martina	(Netherlands) Feyenoord	31 May 2019	

== Pre-season ==
=== Friendlies ===
For their pre-season tour, Everton announced they would be playing six teams away from home, which were ATV Irdning, Bury, Lille, Porto, Blackburn Rovers and Rennes. They also played one game at home against Valencia. Everton hosted Gor Mahia at Goodison Park.

14 July 2018 Friendly	ATV Irdning (Austria)	0–22	(England) Everton	Irdning, Austria
17:00 CEST		Report	Baines 4'; Holgate 7'; Keane 13'; Tosun 14', 16', 32', 45'; Lookman 17', 28', 35'; Mirallas 47', 49', 51', 58', 79'; Niasse 69', 74', 85', 88'; Vlašić 72', 84'; Schmid 80' (o.g.)	Stadium: ATV Arena

18 July 2018 Friendly	Bury (England)	1–1	(England) Everton	Bury, Greater Manchester
19:45 BST	Danns 43'	Report	Niasse 63'	Stadium: Gigg Lane

21 July 2018 Algarve Football Cup	Lille (France)	0–0 (4–2 p)	(England) Everton	Algarve, Portugal
21:00 CEST		Report		Stadium: Estádio Algarve
	Penalties
	Pépé (penalty scored); Bamba (penalty scored); Benzia (penalty scored); El Ghazi (penalty scored)		(penalty missed) Niasse; (penalty scored) Bešić; (penalty scored) Mirallas; (penalty missed) Vlašić

22 July 2018 Algarve Football Cup	Porto (Portugal)	1–0	(England) Everton	Algarve, Portugal
21:00 CEST	Marega 51'			Stadium: Estádio Algarve

26 July 2018 Friendly	Blackburn Rovers (England)	3–0	(England) Everton	Blackburn, Lancashire
19:45 BST	Lenihan 10'; Samuel 40'; Dack 68'	Report		Stadium: Ewood Park; Referee: Martin Atkinson (England)

28 July 2018 Friendly	Rennes (France)	4–1	(England) Everton	Vitré, France
18:30 CEST	Bourigeaud 28'; Siebatcheu 35'; Maouassa 77'; Léa Siliki 79'	Report	Richarlison 45+1'	Stadium: Stade Municipal

4 August 2018 Friendly	Everton (England)	2–3	(Spain) Valencia	Liverpool
15:00 BST	Tosun 17'; Keane 30'; Calvert-Lewin (yellow card) 90+2'		Rodrigo 6', 22'; Wass 75'; Parejo (yellow card) 81'	Stadium: Goodison Park

6 November 2018 Friendly	Everton (England)	4–0	(Kenya) Gor Mahia	Liverpool
20:00 GMT	Lookman 15'; Dowell 26'; Broadhead 86'; Niasse 89'	Report		Stadium: Goodison Park; Referee: Peter Bankes (England)

== Competitions ==
=== Premier League ===
==== League table ====
Pos	Team	Pld	W	D	L	GF	GA	GD	Pts	Qualification or relegation
6	Manchester United	38	19	9	10	65	54	+11	66	Qualification to Europa League group stage (Note: Since the winners of the EFL Cup and the FA Cup, Manchester City, qualified for the Champions League, the spot given to the FA Cup winners (Europa League group stage) was passed to the sixth-placed team and the spot given to the League Cup winners (Europa League second qualifying round) was passed to the seventh-placed team.)
7	Wolverhampton Wanderers	38	16	9	13	47	46	+1	57	Qualification to Europa League second qualifying round
8	Everton	38	15	9	14	54	46	+8	54	
9	Leicester City	38	15	7	16	51	48	+3	52	
10	West Ham United	38	15	7	16	52	55	−3	52	

Source: Premier League
Rules for classification: 1) Points; 2) Goal difference; 3) Goals scored; 4) Play-offs (only if needed to decide champion, teams for relegation or teams for UEFA competitions).
Notes:

Everton gets 8th.

==== Results summary ====
Overall								Home						Away					
Pld	W	D	L	GF	GA	GD	Pts	W	D	L	GF	GA	GD	W	D	L	GF	GA	GD
38	15	9	14	54	46	+8	54	10	4	5	30	21	+9	5	5	9	24	25	−1

Last updated: 12 May 2019.
Source: Premier League

==== Results by matchday ====
Matchday	1	2	3	4	5	6	7	8	9	10	11	12	13	14	15	16	17	18	19	20	21	22	23	24	25	26	27	28	29	30	31	32	33	34	35	36	37	38
Ground	A	H	A	H	H	A	H	A	H	A	H	A	H	A	H	H	A	H	A	A	H	H	A	A	H	H	A	A	H	A	H	A	H	A	H	A	H	A
Result	D	W	D	D	L	L	W	W	W	L	W	D	W	L	D	D	L	L	W	L	L	W	L	W	L	L	L	W	D	L	W	W	W	L	W	D	W	D
Position	9	7	8	7	10	12	11	11	8	9	9	9	6	6	6	7	8	11	8	10	10	10	11	8	9	9	8	9	10	11	11	9	9	9	9	8	8	8

Updated to match(es) played on 12 May 2019. Source: Statto.com
A = Away; H = Home; W = Win; D = Draw; L = Loss

==== Matches ====
On 14 June 2018, the Premier League fixtures for the forthcoming season were announced.

11 August 2018 1	Wolverhampton Wanderers	2–2	Everton	Wolverhampton
17:30 BST	Neves 44'; Jiménez 80'	Report	Richarlison (yellow card) 14', (goal) 17', 67'; Jagielka (red card) 40'	Stadium: Molineux Stadium; Attendance: 31,231; Referee: Craig Pawson

18 August 2018 2	Everton	2–1	Southampton	Walton, Liverpool
15:00 BST	Walcott 15'; Richarlison 31'	Report	Hoedt (yellow card) 17'; Lemina (yellow card) 19'; Romeu (yellow card) 36'; Cédric (yellow card) 45'; Ings 54'; Stephens (yellow card) 59'	Stadium: Goodison Park; Attendance: 38,601; Referee: Lee Mason

25 August 2018 3	Bournemouth	2–2	Everton	Kings Park, Bournemouth
15:00 BST	Smith (red card) 61'; King 75' (pen.); Aké 79'	Report	Richarlison (red card) 41'; Sigurðsson (yellow card) 55'; Walcott 56'; Keane 66'; Tosun (yellow card) 70'; Gueye (yellow card) 81'	Stadium: Dean Court; Attendance: 10,654; Referee: Lee Probert

1 September 2018 4	Everton	1–1	Huddersfield Town	Walton, Liverpool
15:00 BST	Calvert-Lewin 36'; Holgate (yellow card) 55'; Davies (yellow card) 63'; Schneiderlin (yellow card) 86'	Report	Billing (yellow card) 4', (goal) 34'; Hadergjonaj (yellow card) 73'; Jorgensen (yellow card) 89'	Stadium: Goodison Park; Attendance: 38,767; Referee: Stuart Attwell

16 September 2018 5	Everton	1–3	West Ham United	Walton, Liverpool
16:00 BST	Calvert-Lewin (yellow card) 18'; Sigurðsson 45+2'; Bernard (yellow card) 90+4'	Report	Yarmolenko 11', 31', (yellow card) 51'; Masuaku (yellow card) 40'; Zabaleta (yellow card) 53'; Arnautović 61'; Rice (yellow card) 75'; Snodgrass (yellow card) 90+1'	Stadium: Goodison Park; Attendance: 39,161; Referee: Martin Atkinson

23 September 2018 6	Arsenal	2–0	Everton	Holloway
16:00 BST	Torreira (yellow card) 15'; Papastathopoulos (yellow card) 30'; Lacazette 56'; Aubameyang 59'	Report	Digne (yellow card) 27'	Stadium: Emirates Stadium; Attendance: 59,964; Referee: Jonathan Moss

29 September 2018 7	Everton	3–0	Fulham	Walton, Liverpool
15:00 BST	Sigurðsson 56', 89'; Tosun 66'	Report	Christie (yellow card) 29'; Odoi (yellow card) 51'; Mitrović (yellow card) 53'	Stadium: Goodison Park; Attendance: 38,788; Referee: Roger East

6 October 2018 8	Leicester City	1–2	Everton	Leicester
15:00 BST	Pereira 40'; Morgan (yellow card) 43' (yellow-red card) 63'	Report	Richarlison 7'; Sigurðsson 77'	Stadium: King Power Stadium; Attendance: 32,007; Referee: Andre Marriner

21 October 2018 9	Everton	2–0	Crystal Palace	Walton, Liverpool
16:00 BST	Gueye (yellow card) 29'; Coleman (yellow card) 80'; Calvert-Lewin 87'; Tosun 89'	Report	Milivojević (yellow card) 51'	Stadium: Goodison Park; Attendance: 38,668; Referee: Anthony Taylor

28 October 2018 10	Manchester United	2–1	Everton	Manchester
16:00 GMT	Smalling (yellow card) 20'; Pogba (penalty missed) 27', 27'; Matić (yellow card) 39'; Martial 49'	Report	Gueye (yellow card) 22'; Sigurðsson 77' (pen.)	Stadium: Old Trafford; Attendance: 74,525; Referee: Jonathan Moss

3 November 2018 11	Everton	3–1	Brighton & Hove Albion	Walton, Liverpool
15:00 GMT	Richarlison 26', 77'; Coleman 50'	Report	Dunk (yellow card) 10', (goal) 33'	Stadium: Goodison Park; Attendance: 38,966; Referee: David Coote

11 November 2018 12	Chelsea	0–0	Everton	Fulham
14:15 GMT	Jorginho (yellow card) 28'; Kanté (yellow card) 33'; Rüdiger (yellow card) 45+2'; Morata (yellow card) 87'	Report	Mina (yellow card) 22'; Bernard (yellow card) 45+2'; Pickford (yellow card) 73'	Stadium: Stamford Bridge; Attendance: 40,345; Referee: Kevin Friend

24 November 2018 13	Everton	1–0	Cardiff City	Walton, Liverpool
15:00 GMT	Sigurðsson 59'	Report	Etheridge (yellow card) 43'; Camarasa (yellow card) 58'; Harris (yellow card) 63'	Stadium: Goodison Park; Attendance: 39,139; Referee: Paul Tierney

2 December 2018 14	Liverpool	1–0	Everton	Anfield, Liverpool
16:15 GMT	Shaqiri (yellow card) 33'; Fabinho (yellow card) 77'; Gomez (yellow card) 80'; Origi 90+6'	Report	Gomes (yellow card) 88'; Sigurðsson (yellow card) 90'	Stadium: Anfield; Attendance: 51,756; Referee: Chris Kavanagh

5 December 2018 15	Everton	1–1	Newcastle United	Walton, Liverpool
19:45 GMT	Richarlison 38'	Report	Rondón 19'	Stadium: Goodison Park; Attendance: 39,350; Referee: Lee Mason

10 December 2018 16	Everton	2–2	Watford	Walton, Liverpool
20:00 GMT	Richarlison 15'; Digne 90+6'	Report	Coleman 63' (o.g.); Doucouré 65'	Stadium: Goodison Park; Attendance: 38,400; Referee: Kevin Friend

15 December 2018 17	Manchester City	3–1	Everton	Manchester
12:30 GMT	Gabriel Jesus 22', 50'; Sterling 69'; Delph (yellow card) 76'	Report	Digne (yellow card) 19'; Calvert-Lewin 65', (yellow card) 76'	Stadium: Etihad Stadium; Attendance: 54,173; Referee: Craig Pawson

23 December 2018 18	Everton	2–6	Tottenham Hotspur	Walton, Liverpool
16:00 GMT	Walcott 21'; Sigurðsson 51'	Report	Son 27', 61'; Trippier (yellow card) 32'; Alli 35'; Kane 42', 74'; Eriksen 48', (yellow card) 71'	Stadium: Goodison Park; Attendance: 39,319; Referee: Paul Tierney

26 December 2018 19	Burnley	1–5	Everton	Burnley
15:00 GMT	Lowton (yellow card) 30'; Gibson 36', (yellow card) 45'	Report	Mina 2'; Digne 13', 71'; Sigurðsson 22' (pen.), (yellow card) 25'; Gomes (yellow card) 30'; Gueye (yellow card) 90+1'; Richarlison 90+3', (yellow card) 90+4'	Stadium: Turf Moor; Attendance: 21,484; Referee: Michael Oliver

29 December 2018 20	Brighton & Hove Albion	1–0	Everton	Falmer
15:00 GMT	Locadia 59'	Report	Bernard (yellow card) 53'; Mina (yellow card) 56'	Stadium: Falmer Stadium; Attendance: 30,597; Referee: Andrew Madley

1 January 2019 21	Everton	0–1	Leicester City	Walton, Liverpool
12:30 GMT	Gomes (yellow card) 52'; Digne (yellow card) 80'; Tosun (yellow card) 81'	Report	Vardy 58'; Evans (yellow card) 75'	Stadium: Goodison Park; Attendance: 39,052; Referee: Martin Atkinson

13 January 2019 22	Everton	2–0	Bournemouth	Walton, Liverpool
14:15 GMT	Bernard (yellow card) 38'; Zouma 61', (yellow card) 66'; Keane (yellow card) 65'; Gomes (yellow card) 66'; Richarlison (yellow card) 84'; Calvert-Lewin 90+5'	Report		Stadium: Goodison Park; Attendance: 38,113; Referee: Anthony Taylor

19 January 2019 23	Southampton	2–1	Everton	Southampton
15:00 GMT	Ward-Prowse 50'; Digne 64' (o.g.); Redmond (yellow card) 67'; Long (yellow card) 90+7'	Report	Gueye (yellow card) 67'; Sigurðsson 90+1'	Stadium: St Mary's Stadium; Attendance: 29,989; Referee: Graham Scott

29 January 2019 24	Huddersfield Town	0–1	Everton	Huddersfield
19:45 GMT	Puncheon (yellow card) 65'	Report	Richarlison 3'; Bernard (yellow card) 31'; Tosun (yellow card) 43'; Digne (red card) 66'; Gomes (yellow card) 87'; Calvert-Lewin (yellow card) 90+5'	Stadium: John Smith's Stadium; Attendance: 23,699; Referee: Stuart Attwell

2 February 2019 25	Everton	1–3	Wolverhampton Wanderers	Walton, Liverpool
15:00 GMT	Gomes 27'	Report	Neves 7' (pen.); Jiménez 45'; Dendoncker 66'	Stadium: Goodison Park; Attendance: 39,380; Referee: Lee Mason

6 February 2019 26	Everton	0–2	Manchester City	Walton, Liverpool
19:45 GMT	Zouma (yellow card) 82'	Report	Laporte 45+2'; Fernandinho (yellow card) 73'; Gabriel Jesus 90+7'	Stadium: Goodison Park; Attendance: 39,322; Referee: Craig Pawson

9 February 2019 27	Watford	1–0	Everton	Watford
15:00 GMT	Gray 65'; Deeney (yellow card) 70'; Holebas (yellow card) 83'	Report	Zouma (yellow card) 90+5' (yellow-red card) 90+5'	Stadium: Vicarage Road; Attendance: 20,333; Referee: Lee Probert

26 February 2019 28	Cardiff City	0–3	Everton	Cardiff
19:45 GMT	Bacuna (yellow card) 7'; Morrison (yellow card) 14'; Murphy (yellow card) 81'	Report	Sigurðsson 41', 66'; Digne (yellow card) 50'; Calvert-Lewin 90+3'	Stadium: Cardiff City Stadium; Attendance: 31,849; Referee: Kevin Friend

3 March 2019 29	Everton	0–0	Liverpool	Walton, Liverpool
16:15 GMT	Walcott (yellow card) 7'	Report	Robertson (yellow card) 75'; Fabinho (yellow card) 79'	Stadium: Goodison Park; Attendance: 39,335; Referee: Martin Atkinson

9 March 2019 30	Newcastle United	3–2	Everton	Newcastle
15:00 GMT	Ritchie (penalty missed) 31'; Lascelles (yellow card) 42'; Rondón 65'; Schär (yellow card) 70'; Pérez 81', 84'; Shelvey (yellow card) 89'	Report	Calvert-Lewin 18'; Richarlison 32'; Kenny (yellow card) 53'	Stadium: St James' Park; Attendance: 52,242; Referee: Lee Mason

17 March 2019 31	Everton	2–0	Chelsea	Walton, Liverpool
16:30 GMT	Richarlison 49'; Gomes (yellow card) 59'; Sigurðsson (penalty missed) 72' 72'	Report	Alonso (yellow card) 36'; Rüdiger (yellow card) 61'	Stadium: Goodison Park; Attendance: 39,356; Referee: Anthony Taylor

30 March 2019 32	West Ham United	0–2	Everton	Stratford
17:30 GMT	Rice (yellow card) 64'	Report	Zouma 5'; Bernard 33'; Richarlison (yellow card) 42'	Stadium: London Stadium; Attendance: 59,988; Referee: Paul Tierney

7 April 2019 33	Everton	1–0	Arsenal	Walton, Liverpool
14:05 BST	Jagielka 10'; Gomes (yellow card) 50'	Report	Guendouzi (yellow card) 6'; Papastathopoulos (yellow card) 25'; Mustafi (yellow card) 82'; Monreal (yellow card) 86'	Stadium: Goodison Park; Attendance: 39,400; Referee: Kevin Friend

13 April 2019 34	Fulham	2–0	Everton	Fulham
15:00 BST	Cairney 46'; Ream (yellow card) 48'; Le Marchand (yellow card) 57'; Babel 69'	Report	Richarlison (yellow card) 44'	Stadium: Craven Cottage; Attendance: 24,971; Referee: Lee Probert

21 April 2019 35	Everton	4–0	Manchester United	Walton, Liverpool
13:30 BST	Richarlison 13'; Gueye (yellow card) 23'; Sigurðsson 28'; Digne 56'; Walcott 64'	Report	McTominay (yellow card) 68'	Stadium: Goodison Park; Attendance: 39,395; Referee: Paul Tierney

27 April 2019 36	Crystal Palace	0–0	Everton	Selhurst
15:00 BST	Milivojević (yellow card) 10'; Kouyaté (yellow card) 74'	Report		Stadium: Selhurst Park; Attendance: 25,789; Referee: Lee Mason

3 May 2019 37	Everton	2–0	Burnley	Walton, Liverpool
20:00 BST	Mee 17' (o.g.); Coleman 20'	Report	Westwood (yellow card) 37'; Tarkowski (yellow card) 80'	Stadium: Goodison Park; Attendance: 39,303; Referee: Chris Kavanagh

12 May 2019 38	Tottenham Hotspur	2–2	Everton	Tottenham
15:00 BST	Dier 3'; Eriksen 75'	Report	Walcott 69'; Schneiderlin (yellow card) 71'; Tosun 72'; Digne (yellow card) 90'	Stadium: Tottenham Hotspur Stadium; Attendance: 60,124; Referee: Andre Marriner

=== FA Cup ===
In the FA Cup, Everton entered the competition in the third round and were drawn home to Lincoln City. The fourth round draw was made live on BBC by Robbie Keane and Carl Ikeme from Wolverhampton on 7 January 2019.

5 January 2019 Third round	Everton	2–1	Lincoln City	Walton
15:00 GMT	Lookman 12'; Bernard 14'; Kenny (yellow card) 47'	Report	Bostwick 28'	Stadium: Goodison Park; Attendance: 37,900; Referee: John Brooks

26 January 2019 Fourth round	Millwall	3–2	Everton	Bermondsey
17:30 GMT	Gregory 45+2'; Wallace (yellow card) 67', (goal) 90+4'; Cooper 75'	Report	Richarlison 43'; Tosun 72', (yellow card) 76'; Gueye (yellow card) 76'	Stadium: The Den; Attendance: 16,354; Referee: Michael Oliver

=== EFL Cup ===
Everton joined the competition in the second round where they defeated Rotherham United at home. They lost to fellow Premier League side Southampton in the third round.

29 August 2018 Second round	Everton	3–1	Rotherham United	Liverpool
19:45 BST	Sigurðsson 28'; Digne (yellow card) 52'; Calvert-Lewin 61', 87'	Report	Vaulks 86'	Stadium: Goodison Park; Attendance: 31,972; Referee: Graham Scott

2 October 2018 Third round	Everton	1–1 (3–4 p)	Southampton	Liverpool
19:45 BST	Schneiderlin (yellow card) 39'; Walcott 85'	Report	Ings 44'; Bednarek (yellow card) 80'	Stadium: Goodison Park; Attendance: 30,545; Referee: Chris Kavanagh
	Penalties
	Baines (penalty scored); Tosun (penalty scored); Richarlison (penalty missed); Zouma (penalty scored); Walcott (penalty missed)		(penalty scored) Ings; (penalty scored) Davis; (penalty scored) Højbjerg; (penalty missed) Targett; (penalty scored) Cédric

== Players ==
=== First team squad ===
As of 25 August 2018

Note: Flags indicate national team as defined under FIFA eligibility rules; some limited exceptions apply. Players may hold more than one non-FIFA nationality.

No.	Pos.	Nation	Player
1	GK	ENG	Jordan Pickford
2	DF	ENG	Mason Holgate
3	DF	ENG	Leighton Baines (vice-captain)
4	DF	ENG	Michael Keane
5	DF	FRA	Kurt Zouma (on loan from Chelsea)
6	DF	ENG	Phil Jagielka (captain)
8	MF	POR	André Gomes (on loan from Barcelona)
10	MF	ISL	Gylfi Sigurðsson
11	FW	ENG	Theo Walcott
12	DF	FRA	Lucas Digne
13	DF	COL	Yerry Mina
14	FW	TUR	Cenk Tosun
16	MF	IRL	James McCarthy
17	MF	SEN	Idrissa Gueye

No.	Pos.	Nation	Player
18	MF	FRA	Morgan Schneiderlin
19	FW	SEN	Oumar Niasse
20	FW	BRA	Bernard
22	GK	NED	Maarten Stekelenburg
23	DF	IRL	Séamus Coleman (3rd captain)
26	MF	ENG	Tom Davies
28	MF	ENG	Kieran Dowell
29	FW	ENG	Dominic Calvert-Lewin
30	FW	BRA	Richarlison
31	FW	ENG	Ademola Lookman
34	MF	COD	Beni Baningime
41	GK	POL	Mateusz Hewelt
43	DF	ENG	Jonjoe Kenny

== Squad statistics ==
=== Appearances and goals ===
No.	Pos	Nat	Player	Total		Premier League		FA Cup		League Cup	
No.	Pos	Nat	Player	Apps	Goals	Apps	Goals	Apps	Goals	Apps	Goals
Goalkeepers
1	GK	(England) ENG	Jordan Pickford	40	0	38	0	2	0	0	0
22	GK	(Netherlands) NED	Maarten Stekelenburg	2	0	0	0	0	0	2	0
Defenders
3	DF	(England) ENG	Leighton Baines	8	0	5+1	0	1	0	1	0
4	DF	(England) ENG	Michael Keane	35	1	33	1	1	0	1	0
5	DF	(France) FRA	Kurt Zouma	36	2	29+3	2	1+1	0	2	0
6	DF	(England) ENG	Phil Jagielka	7	1	4+3	1	0	0	0	0
12	DF	(France) FRA	Lucas Digne	37	4	33+2	4	1	0	1	0
13	DF	(Colombia) COL	Yerry Mina	15	1	10+3	1	2	0	0	0
23	DF	(Republic of Ireland) IRL	Séamus Coleman	30	2	29	2	1	0	0	0
43	DF	(England) ENG	Jonjoe Kenny	13	0	8+2	0	1	0	2	0
Midfielders
8	MF	(Portugal) POR	André Gomes	29	1	24+3	1	1+1	0	0	0
10	MF	(Iceland) ISL	Gylfi Sigurðsson	41	14	36+2	13	2	0	1	1
16	MF	(Republic of Ireland) IRL	James McCarthy	1	0	0+1	0	0	0	0	0
17	MF	(Senegal) SEN	Idrissa Gueye	35	0	32+1	0	2	0	0	0
18	MF	(France) FRA	Morgan Schneiderlin	16	0	10+4	0	0	0	1+1	0
20	MF	(Brazil) BRA	Bernard	36	2	25+9	1	1	1	1	0
26	MF	(England) ENG	Tom Davies	19	0	10+6	0	1	0	2	0
Forwards
11	FW	(England) ENG	Theo Walcott	40	6	24+13	5	1	0	0+2	1
14	FW	(Turkey) TUR	Cenk Tosun	29	4	10+15	3	1+1	1	1+1	0
29	FW	(England) ENG	Dominic Calvert-Lewin	38	8	19+16	6	2	0	1	2
30	FW	(Brazil) BRA	Richarlison	38	14	32+3	13	1+1	1	0+1	0
31	FW	(England) ENG	Ademola Lookman	24	1	3+18	0	2	1	1	0
Players transferred/loaned out during the season
2	DF	(England) ENG	Mason Holgate	6	0	4+1	0	0	0	1	0
9	FW	(Spain) ESP	Sandro	1	0	0	0	0	0	1	0
19	FW	(Senegal) SEN	Oumar Niasse	7	0	0+5	0	0	0	1+1	0
28	MF	(England) ENG	Kieran Dowell	2	0	0	0	0	0	2	0

Last updated: 12 May 2019
Source: Competitions

=== Goalscorers ===
As of match played 12 May 2019.

Rank	Pos.	No.	Player	Premier League	FA Cup	League Cup	Total
1	MF	18	(Iceland) Gylfi Sigurðsson	13	0	1	14
1	FW	30	(Brazil) Richarlison	13	1	0	14
3	FW	29	(England) Dominic Calvert-Lewin	6	0	2	8
4	FW	11	(England) Theo Walcott	5	0	1	6
5	DF	12	(France) Lucas Digne	4	0	0	4
5	FW	14	(Turkey) Cenk Tosun	3	1	0	4
7	DF	5	(France) Kurt Zouma	2	0	0	2
7	DF	23	(Republic of Ireland) Séamus Coleman	2	0	0	2
7	MF	20	(Brazil) Bernard	1	1	0	2
10	DF	4	(England) Michael Keane	1	0	0	1
10	DF	6	(England) Phil Jagielka	1	0	0	1
10	DF	13	(Colombia) Yerry Mina	1	0	0	1
10	MF	8	(Portugal) André Gomes	1	0	0	1
10	FW	31	(England) Ademola Lookman	0	1	0	1
Total				53	4	4	61

Source: Match reports in Competitions

=== Disciplinary record ===
As of match played 12 May 2019.

Rank	Position	Name	Premier League		FA Cup		League Cup		Total	
Rank	Position	Name	Booked	Sent off (straight red)	Booked	Sent off (straight red)	Booked	Sent off (straight red)	Booked	Sent off (straight red)
1	DF	(France) Lucas Digne	5	1	0	0	1	0	6	1
1	MF	(Portugal) André Gomes	7	0	0	0	0	0	7	0
1	MF	(Senegal) Idrissa Gueye	6	0	1	0	0	0	7	0
4	FW	(Brazil) Richarlison	5	1	0	0	0	0	5	1
5	DF	(France) Kurt Zouma	4	1	0	0	0	0	4	1
5	MF	(Brazil) Bernard	5	0	0	0	0	0	5	0
7	FW	(Turkey) Cenk Tosun	3	0	1	0	0	0	4	0
8	DF	(Colombia) Yerry Mina	3	0	0	0	0	0	3	0
8	MF	(Iceland) Gylfi Sigurðsson	3	0	0	0	0	0	3	0
8	MF	(France) Morgan Schneiderlin	2	0	0	0	1	0	3	0
8	MF	(England) Tom Davies	3	0	0	0	0	0	3	0
8	FW	(England) Dominic Calvert-Lewin	3	0	0	0	0	0	3	0
13	DF	(England) Michael Keane	2	0	0	0	0	0	2	0
13	DF	(England) Jonjoe Kenny	1	0	1	0	0	0	2	0
15	DF	(England) Phil Jagielka	0	1	0	0	0	0	0	1
15	GK	(England) Jordan Pickford	1	0	0	0	0	0	1	0
15	DF	(England) Mason Holgate	1	0	0	0	0	0	1	0
15	DF	(Republic of Ireland) Séamus Coleman	1	0	0	0	0	0	1	0
15	FW	(England) Theo Walcott	1	0	0	0	0	0	1	0
Total			54	4	3	0	2	0	59	4

Source: Match reports in Competitions
