= Mateusz Hewelt =

Polish footballer

Personal information
- Full name: Mateusz Tomasz Hewelt
- Date of birth: 23 September 1996 (age 30)
- Place of birth: Gdynia, Poland
- Height: 1.91 m (6 ft 3 in)
- Position: Goalkeeper

Team information
- Current team: Warrington Town
- Number: 1

Youth career
- Stella Maris
- Shelbourne
- 2013–2016: Everton

Senior career*
Years	Team	Apps	(Gls)
2016–2019	Everton	0	(0)
2019–2021	Miedź Legnica	11	(1)
2019–2021	Miedź Legnica II	8	(0)
2021–2022	Bamber Bridge	19	(0)
2022–2023	Tranmere Rovers	14	(0)
2022	→ Bamber Bridge (loan)	2	(0)
2022	→ Stafford Rangers (loan)	11	(0)
2023–2026	Radcliffe	82+	(0)
2026–	Warrington Town	0	(0)
- * Club domestic league appearances and goals as of 14:17, 1 April 2024 (UTC)

Mateusz Tomasz Hewelt (born 23 September 1996) is a Polish professional footballer who plays as a goalkeeper for Northern Premier League Premier Division club Warrington Town.

== Career ==
At the age of five, Hewelt moved to the Republic of Ireland, where he was scouted by English Premier League side Everton, who eventually signed him.

In 2019, Hewelt signed for Miedź Legnica in the Polish second division.

On 3 October 2020, he scored an equaliser in stoppage time of a 2–2 draw against Chrobry Głogów.

He signed for Northern Premier League side Bamber Bridge on a free transfer in September 2021.

On 28 January 2022, Hewelt joined EFL League Two side Tranmere Rovers on a short-term contract and was immediately loaned back to Bamber Bridge for the rest of the 2021–22 season. On 26 February 2022, his loan at Bamber Bridge was cut short and he instead joined Northern Premier League Premier Division rivals Stafford Rangers on loan for the remainder of the season.

On 9 May 2023, Tranmere announced he was being released.

In June 2023, Hewelt signed for Northern Premier League Premier Division club Radcliffe.

After three seasons with Radcliffe, on 2 June 2026 Hewelt moved to another Northern Premier League Premier Division side Warrington Town.

== Honours ==
Everton U23s

- Premier League Cup: 2018–19

Radcliffe

- Northern Premier League Premier Division: 2023–24
