= 2016–17 Everton F.C. season =

English football club season

Everton
2016–17 season
- Chairman: Bill Kenwright
- Manager: Ronald Koeman
- Stadium: Goodison Park
- Premier League: 7th
- FA Cup: Third Round
- League Cup: Third Round
- Top goalscorer: League: Romelu Lukaku (25); All: Romelu Lukaku (26)
- Highest home attendance: 39,595
- Average home league attendance: 39,310
Home colours	Away colours	Third colours

The 2016–17 season was Everton's 63rd consecutive season in the top flight of English football and their 139th year in existence. They participated in the Premier League, FA Cup, League Cup and League Trophy. The season covered the period from 1 July 2016 to 30 June 2017.

== Players ==
=== First team ===
Everton announced their squad numbers for the 2016–17 Premier League on 3 August 2016.

Squad No.	Name	Nationality	Position(s)	Date of birth (age)
Goalkeepers
1	Joel Robles	(Spain)	GK	17 June 1990 (age 36)
22	Maarten Stekelenburg	(Netherlands)	GK	22 September 1982 (age 43)
Defenders
3	Leighton Baines	(England)	LB	11 December 1984 (age 41)
5	Ashley Williams	(Wales)	CB	23 August 1984 (age 42)
6	Phil Jagielka	(England)	CB	17 August 1982 (age 44)
23	Séamus Coleman	(Republic of Ireland)	RB	11 October 1988 (age 37)
25	Ramiro Funes Mori	(Argentina)	CB	5 March 1991 (age 35)
27	Tyias Browning	(England)	RB	27 May 1994 (age 32)
30	Mason Holgate	(England)	CB	22 October 1996 (age 29)
32	Brendan Galloway	(England)	LB	17 March 1996 (age 30)
38	Matthew Pennington	(England)	CB	6 October 1994 (age 31)
Midfielders
2	Morgan Schneiderlin	(France)	CM	8 November 1989 (age 36)
7	Gerard Deulofeu	(Spain)	RM/LM	13 March 1994 (age 32)
8	Ross Barkley	(England)	AM	5 December 1993 (age 32)
11	Kevin Mirallas	(Belgium)	RM/LM	5 October 1987 (age 38)
12	Aaron Lennon	(England)	RM	16 April 1987 (age 39)
14	Yannick Bolasie	(Democratic Republic of the Congo)	LM	24 May 1989 (age 37)
15	Tom Cleverley	(England)	CM	12 August 1989 (age 37)
16	James McCarthy	(Republic of Ireland)	CM	12 November 1990 (age 35)
17	Idrissa Gueye	(Senegal)	CM	26 September 1989 (age 36)
18	Gareth Barry	(England)	DM	23 February 1981 (age 45)
21	Muhamed Bešić	(Bosnia and Herzegovina)	DM	10 September 1992 (age 33)
26	Tom Davies	(England)	DM	30 June 1998 (age 28)
28	Kieran Dowell	(England)	AM	10 October 1997 (age 28)
39	Conor Grant	(England)	CM	18 April 1995 (age 31)
Forwards
9	Arouna Koné	(Ivory Coast)	FW	11 November 1982 (age 43)
10	Romelu Lukaku	(Belgium)	FW	13 May 1993 (age 33)
19	Enner Valencia	(Ecuador)	ST	4 November 1989 (age 36)
29	Dominic Calvert-Lewin	(England)	FW	16 March 1997 (age 29)
31	Ademola Lookman	(England)	FW	20 October 1997 (age 28)

=== Player awards ===
- Player of the Season – Romelu Lukaku
- Players' Player of the Season – Romelu Lukaku
- Young Player of the Season – Tom Davies
- Reserve / U21 Player of the Season – Jonjoe Kenny
- Goal of the Season – Tom Davies vs. Manchester City

== Transfers ==
=== Transfers in ===
Date from	Position	Nationality	Name	From	Fee	Ref.
1 July 2016	CF	GER	Bassala Sambou	Coventry City	Free transfer	
1 July 2016	GK	NED	Maarten Stekelenburg	Fulham	£850,000	
1 July 2016	GK	ENG	Chris Renshaw	Oldham Athletic	Free transfer	
2 July 2016	GK	ENG	Joe Hilton	Manchester City	Free transfer	
2 July 2016	CB	ENG	Nathan Baxter	Vitesse	Free transfer	
2 August 2016	MF	SEN	Idrissa Gueye	Aston Villa	£7,100,000	
10 August 2016	DF	WAL	Ashley Williams	Swansea City	£9,000,000	
15 August 2016	MF	DRC	Yannick Bolasie	Crystal Palace	£22,500,000	
1 September 2016	CF	ENG	Dominic Calvert-Lewin	Sheffield United	£1,500,000	
5 January 2017	MF	ENG	Ademola Lookman	Charlton Athletic	£7,500,000	
12 January 2017	MF	FRA	Morgan Schneiderlin	Manchester United	£20,000,000	

Total spending: £73,950,000

=== Transfers out ===
Date from	Position	Nationality	Name	To	Fee	Ref.
30 June 2016	DF	WAL	James Graham	—	Released	
30 June 2016	DF	ENG	Tony Hibbert	—	Released	
30 June 2016	DF	BRA	Felipe Mattioni	—	Released	
30 June 2016	MF	ENG	Leon Osman	—	Released	
30 June 2016	MF	RSA	Steven Pienaar	Sunderland	Released	
30 June 2016	GK	CZE	Jindřich Staněk	—	Released	
30 June 2016	DF	ENG	Jordan Thorniley	Sheffield Wednesday	Released	
4 July 2016	GK	USA	Tim Howard	Colorado Rapids	Free transfer	
2 August 2016	MF	IRL	Steven Kinsella	St Patrick's Athletic	Free transfer	
9 August 2016	DF	ENG	John Stones	Manchester City	£47,500,000	
22 August 2016	DF	ENG	Spencer Myers	Fleetwood Town	Free transfer	
25 August 2016	CM	ENG	Ryan Ledson	Oxford United	Undisclosed	
22 January 2017	LW	ENG	Nathan Holland	West Ham United	Undisclosed	
30 January 2017	CM	IRL	Darron Gibson	Sunderland	£3,000,000	
30 January 2017	LB	CRC	Bryan Oviedo	Sunderland	£4,500,000	

Total incoming: £55,000,000

=== Loans in ===
Date from	Position	Nationality	Name	From	Date until	Ref.
31 August 2016	CF	ECU	Enner Valencia	West Ham United	End of Season	
25 January 2017	LM	GER	Anton Donkor	VfL Wolfsburg	End of Season	

=== Loans out ===
Date from	Position	Nationality	Name	To	Date until	Ref.
4 August 2016	CM	ENG	Conor Grant	Ipswich Town	18 November 2016 (Note: On 18 November 2016, Conor Grant returned from his loan spell.)	
5 August 2016	GK	ENG	Russell Griffiths	Cheltenham Town	2 January 2017	
16 August 2016	LB	ENG	Luke Garbutt	Wigan Athletic	2 January 2017	
22 August 2016	LB	ENG	Brendan Galloway	West Bromwich Albion	End of Season	
31 August 2016	RW	IRL	Aiden McGeady	Preston North End	End of Season	
31 August 2016	CF	SWI	Shani Tarashaj	Eintracht Frankfurt	End of Season	
1 January 2017	CF	ENG	Delial Brewster	Southport	End of Season	
2 January 2017	CM	ENG	Conor Grant	Doncaster Rovers	End of Season	
12 January 2017	CM	ENG	Tom Cleverley	Watford	End of Season	
13 January 2017	CF	SEN	Oumar Niasse	Hull City	End of Season	
14 January 2017	CB	ENG	Callum Connolly	Wigan Athletic	End of Season	
18 January 2017	RB	WAL	Gethin Jones	Barnsley	End of Season	
19 January 2017	AM	ENG	Antony Evans	Morecambe	End of Season	
20 January 2017	RW	ESP	Gerard Deulofeu	Milan	End of Season	
27 January 2017	GK	ENG	Russell Griffiths	Motherwell	End of Season	
30 January 2017	RB	ENG	Tyias Browning	Preston North End	End of Season	
31 January 2017	CF	ENG	Calum Dyson	Grimsby Town	End of Season	
31 January 2017	LW	IRL	Steven Kinsella	Dundalk	End of Season	
31 January 2017	CF	ENG	Conor McAleny	Oxford United	End of Season	
31 January 2017	CF	URU	Leandro Rodríguez	Waasland-Beveren	End of Season	

== Competitions ==
=== Pre-season and friendlies ===
16 July 2016 Friendly	Jablonec	0–1	Everton	Schruns, Austria
14:00 CEST		Report	Galloway 60'	Stadium: Sportplatz

23 July 2016 Friendly	Barnsley	0–3	Everton	Barnsley
16:00 CEST		Report	Mirallas 9'; Deulofeu 60'; Barkley 73'	Stadium: Oakwell

26 July 2016 Friendly	Milton Keynes Dons	1–3	Everton	Milton Keynes
19:45 BST	Rasulo 31'	Report	Deulofeu 2'; Barkley 19'; Bešić 85'	Stadium: Stadium mk

29 July 2016 Dresden Cup	Dynamo Dresden	2–1	Everton	Dresden, Germany
19:30 BST	Hauptmann 14'; Testroet 65'	Report	Deulofeu 40'	Stadium: Stadion Dresden; Attendance: 12,353

30 July 2016 Dresden Cup	Everton	1–1 (3–4 p)	Real Betis	Dresden, Germany
12:30 BST	Mandi 13' (o.g.)	Report	Pezzella 23'	Stadium: Stadion Dresden
	Penalties
	Grant (penalty missed); Dowell (penalty missed); Stones (penalty scored); Bešić (penalty scored); Holgate (penalty scored)		(penalty missed) Ceballos; (penalty scored) Durmisi; (penalty scored) Sanabria; (penalty scored) Martin; (penalty scored) Musonda

3 August 2016 Wayne Rooney's Testimonial	Manchester United	0–0	Everton	Manchester
20:00 BST		Report		Stadium: Old Trafford

6 August 2016 Friendly	Everton	0–1	Espanyol	Liverpool
15:00 BST		Report	Baptistão 5'	Stadium: Goodison Park; Attendance: 12,080

17 Feb 2017 Friendly	Everton	4–0	Shenzhen	Dubai, UAE
	Barkley; Valencia; Koné	Report		Stadium: NAS Sports Complex

=== Premier League ===
==== League table ====
Pos	Team	Pld	W	D	L	GF	GA	GD	Pts	Qualification or relegation
5	Arsenal	38	23	6	9	77	44	+33	75	Qualification for the Europa League group stage (Note: Arsenal qualified for the Europa League group stage by winning the 2016–17 FA Cup. As they had also qualified there by the virtue of their league position (5th), this spot was passed to the next-highest ranked team (6th), Manchester United.)
6	Manchester United	38	18	15	5	54	29	+25	69	Qualification for the Champions League group stage (Note: Manchester United qualified for the Champions League group stage by winning the 2016–17 UEFA Europa League. Based on their league position (6th), they would have received the spot above to enter the Europa League group stage. This spot was vacated without replacement as per UEFA regulations.)
7	Everton	38	17	10	11	62	44	+18	61	Qualification for the Europa League third qualifying round (Note: Manchester United, winners of the 2016–17 EFL Cup, initially attained a spot in the Europa League third qualifying round. That was passed to the next-highest ranked team in the league not already qualified for UEFA competitions (7th-placed Everton).)
8	Southampton	38	12	10	16	41	48	−7	46	
9	Bournemouth	38	12	10	16	55	67	−12	46	

Source: Premier League
Rules for classification: 1) Points; 2) Goal difference; 3) Goals scored; 4) Play-offs (only if needed to decide champion, teams for relegation or teams for UEFA competitions).

==== Results by matchday ====
Matchday	1	2	3	4	5	6	7	8	9	10	11	12	13	14	15	16	17	18	19	20	21	22	23	24	25	26	27	28	29	30	31	32	33	34	35	36	37	38
Ground	H	A	H	A	H	A	H	A	A	H	A	H	A	H	A	H	H	A	A	H	H	A	A	H	A	H	A	H	H	A	A	H	H	A	H	A	H	A
Result	D	W	W	W	W	L	D	D	L	W	L	D	L	D	L	W	L	W	D	W	W	W	D	W	D	W	L	W	W	L	D	W	W	D	L	L	W	L
Position	5	5	3	2	2	5	5	6	6	6	7	7	7	8	9	7	9	7	7	7	7	7	7	7	7	7	7	7	7	7	7	7	7	6	7	7	7	7

A = Away; H = Home; W = Win; D = Draw; L = Loss

==== Matches ====
13 August 2016 1	Everton	1–1	Tottenham Hotspur	Liverpool
15:00 BST	Barkley 5'	Report	Lamela 59'	Stadium: Goodison Park; Attendance: 39,494; Referee: Martin Atkinson

20 August 2016 2	West Bromwich Albion	1–2	Everton	West Bromwich
15:00 BST	McAuley 9'; Berahino (yellow card) 26'; Olsson (yellow card) 59'; Evans (yellow card) 90+3'	Report	Mirallas 45+2'; Barry 60'	Stadium: The Hawthorns; Attendance: 23,654; Referee: Neil Swarbrick

27 August 2016 3	Everton	1–0	Stoke City	Liverpool
15:00 BST	Barkley (yellow card) 9'; Given 51' (o.g.); Barry (yellow card) 88'	Report	Pieters (yellow card) 56'	Stadium: Goodison Park; Attendance: 39,581; Referee: Michael Oliver

12 September 2016 4	Sunderland	0–3	Everton	Sunderland
20:00 BST	Watmore (yellow card) 43'	Report	Gueye (yellow card) 55'; Lukaku 60', 68', 71'	Stadium: Stadium of Light; Attendance: 42,406; Referee: Mike Jones

17 September 2016 5	Everton	3–1	Middlesbrough	Liverpool
17:30 BST	Barry 24'; Coleman 42'; Lukaku 45+1'	Report	Stekelenburg 21' (o.g.)	Stadium: Goodison Park; Attendance: 39,074; Referee: Lee Mason

24 September 2016 6	Bournemouth	1–0	Everton	Bournemouth
15:00 BST	Stanislas 23'; Daniels (yellow card) 42'; Surman (yellow card) 84'	Report	Gueye (yellow card) 34'; Oviedo (yellow card) 57'	Stadium: Dean Court; Attendance: 11,291; Referee: Robert Madley

30 September 2016 7	Everton	1–1	Crystal Palace	Liverpool
15:00 BST	Oviedo (yellow card) 16'; Lukaku 35'; Barry (yellow card) 68'; Gueye (yellow card) 78'; Bolasie (yellow card) 88'; Cleverley (yellow card) 90+4'	Report	Puncheon (yellow card) 26'; Tomkins (yellow card) 45+1'; Benteke 50', (yellow card) 52'; Townsend (yellow card) 67'	Stadium: Goodison Park; Attendance: 38,758; Referee: Jonathan Moss

15 October 2016 8	Manchester City	1–1	Everton	Manchester
15:00 BST	De Bruyne (penalty missed) 43'; Agüero (penalty missed) 70'; Nolito 72'	Report	Lukaku 64'; Coleman (yellow card) 81'; Williams (yellow card) 85'	Stadium: Etihad Stadium; Attendance: 54,512; Referee: Michael Oliver

22 October 2016 9	Burnley	2–1	Everton	Burnley
15:00 BST	Arfield (yellow card) 18', (goal) 90'; Hendrick (yellow card) 35'; Vokes 39'	Report	Gueye (yellow card) 26'; Coleman (yellow card) 45+1'; Bolasie 58'; Barry (yellow card) 90+2'	Stadium: Turf Moor; Attendance: 21,416; Referee: Mike Jones

30 October 2016 10	Everton	2–0	West Ham United	Liverpool
13:30 GMT	Gueye (yellow card) 32'; Lukaku 50'; Oviedo (yellow card) 74'; Barkley 76'	Report	Obiang (yellow card) 54'; Reid (yellow card) 67'; Antonio (yellow card) 89'	Stadium: Goodison Park; Attendance: 39,574; Referee: Anthony Taylor

5 November 2016 11	Chelsea	5–0	Everton	London
17:30 GMT	Hazard 19', 56'; Alonso 20'; Costa 42'; Pedro 65'	Report	Bolasie (yellow card) 15'; Jagielka (yellow card) 30'; Barry (yellow card) 64'	Stadium: Stamford Bridge; Attendance: 41,429; Referee: Robert Madley

19 November 2016 12	Everton	1–1	Swansea City	Liverpool
15:00 GMT	Jagielka (yellow card) 40'; McCarthy (yellow card) 57'; Baines (yellow card) 63'; Barkley (yellow card) 75'; Coleman 89'; Mirallas (yellow card) 90+2'	Report	Barrow (yellow card) 38'; Sigurðsson 41' (pen.); Naughton (yellow card) 42'	Stadium: Goodison Park; Attendance: 38,773; Referee: Martin Atkinson

27 November 2016 13	Southampton	1–0	Everton	Southampton
16:30 GMT	Austin 1'	Report	Lukaku (yellow card) 78'	Stadium: St. Mary's Stadium; Attendance: 31,132; Referee: Craig Pawson

4 December 2016 14	Everton	1–1	Manchester United	Liverpool
16:00 GMT	Barry (yellow card) 31'; Baines 89' (pen.); Lukaku (yellow card) 90'	Report	Rojo (yellow card) 16'; Ibrahimović 42'; Fellaini (yellow card) 88'; De Gea (yellow card) 88'	Stadium: Goodison Park; Attendance: 39,550; Referee: Craig Pawson

10 December 2016 15	Watford	3–2	Everton	Watford
12:30 GMT	Guedioura (yellow card) 7'; Okaka 36', 64'; Prödl 59'; Holebas (yellow card) 74'	Report	Deulofeu (yellow card) 14'; Lukaku 17', 86'; Baines (yellow card) 62'	Stadium: Vicarage Road; Attendance: 20,769; Referee: Anthony Taylor

13 December 2016 16	Everton	2–1	Arsenal	Liverpool
19:45 GMT	Jagielka (yellow card) 18' (yellow-red card) 90+2'; McCarthy (yellow card) 42'; Coleman 44'; Williams 86'	Report	Sánchez 20'; Koscielny (yellow card) 84'	Stadium: Goodison Park; Attendance: 39,510; Referee: Mark Clattenburg

19 December 2016 17	Everton	0–1	Liverpool	Liverpool
20:00 GMT	Barkley (yellow card) 68'; Coleman (yellow card) 69'; Gueye (yellow card) 85'	Report	Lovren (yellow card) 56'; Mané 90+4'	Stadium: Goodison Park; Attendance: 39,590; Referee: Mike Dean

26 December 2016 18	Leicester City	0–2	Everton	Leicester
15:00 GMT	Simpson (yellow card) 79'; Drinkwater (yellow card) 85'; Morgan (yellow card) 90+1'	Report	Mirallas 51'; Lukaku 90+1'	Stadium: King Power Stadium; Attendance: 31,985; Referee: Stuart Attwell

30 December 2016 19	Hull City	2–2	Everton	Hull
20:00 GMT	Dawson 6'; Elmohamady (yellow card) 62'; Snodgrass 65'; Maguire (yellow card) 83'	Report	Marshall 45+1' (o.g.); Jagielka (yellow card) 60'; Davies (yellow card) 75'; Barkley 84'	Stadium: KCOM Stadium; Attendance: 20,111; Referee: Jonathan Moss

2 January 2017 20	Everton	3–0	Southampton	Liverpool
15:00 GMT	Valencia 73'; Baines 81' (pen.); Lukaku 89'	Report	Ward-Prowse (yellow card) 40'	Stadium: Goodison Park; Attendance: 38,891; Referee: Kevin Friend

15 January 2017 21	Everton	4–0	Manchester City	Liverpool
13:30 GMT	Lukaku 34', (yellow card) 90+1'; Mirallas 47'; Holgate (yellow card) 55'; Davies 79'; Lookman 90+3'	Report	Silva (yellow card) 75'; Otamendi (yellow card) 90+1'	Stadium: Goodison Park; Attendance: 39,588; Referee: Mark Clattenburg

21 January 2017 22	Crystal Palace	0–1	Everton	London
15:00 GMT		Report	Holgate (yellow card) 26'; Coleman 87'	Stadium: Selhurst Park; Attendance: 25,594; Referee: Anthony Taylor

1 February 2017 23	Stoke City	1–1	Everton	Stoke-on-Trent
20:00 GMT	Crouch 7'; Bardsley (yellow card) 81'	Report	Shawcross 39' (o.g.)	Stadium: Bet365 Stadium; Attendance: 27,612; Referee: Craig Pawson

4 February 2017 24	Everton	6–3	Bournemouth	Liverpool
15:00 GMT	Lukaku 1', 29', 83', 85'; McCarthy 23'; Schneiderlin (yellow card) 49'; Robles (yellow card) 74'; Davies (yellow card) 76'; Barkley 90+4'	Report	Arter (yellow card) 14', (goal) 90'; King 59', 70'	Stadium: Goodison Park; Attendance: 39,026; Referee: Mike Jones

11 February 2017 25	Middlesbrough	0–0	Everton	Middlesbrough
15:00 GMT	Clayton (yellow card) 31'; Ramírez (yellow card) 85'	Report		Stadium: Riverside Stadium; Attendance: 31,496; Referee: Mike Dean

25 February 2017 26	Everton	2–0	Sunderland	Liverpool
15:00 GMT	Gueye 40'; Lukaku 80'	Report		Stadium: Goodison Park; Attendance: 39,595; Referee: Stuart Attwell

5 March 2017 27	Tottenham Hotspur	3–2	Everton	Tottenham, London
13:30 GMT	Kane 20', 56'; Dembélé (yellow card) 76'; Alli 90+2'	Report	Gueye (yellow card) 29'; Lukaku 81'; Valencia 90+3'; Williams (yellow card) 90+5'	Stadium: White Hart Lane; Attendance: 31,962; Referee: Michael Oliver

11 March 2017 28	Everton	3–0	West Bromwich Albion	Liverpool
15:00 GMT	Mirallas 39'; Schneiderlin 45+1'; Barry (yellow card) 81'; Lukaku 82'	Report	Yacob (yellow card) 73'; Dawson (yellow card) 88'	Stadium: Goodison Park; Attendance: 39,592; Referee: Graham Scott

18 March 2017 29	Everton	4–0	Hull City	Liverpool
15:00 GMT	Calvert-Lewin 9'; Williams (yellow card) 63'; Valencia 78'; Barry (yellow card) 79'; Lukaku 90+1', 90+4'	Report	Huddlestone (red card) 73'	Stadium: Goodison Park; Attendance: 39,248; Referee: Paul Tierney

1 April 2017 30	Liverpool	3–1	Everton	Liverpool
12:30 BST	Mané 8'; Coutinho 31'; Origi 60'; Can (yellow card) 68'	Report	Davies (yellow card) 26'; Pennington 28'; Barkley (yellow card) 40'; Williams (yellow card) 62'	Stadium: Anfield; Attendance: 52,920; Referee: Anthony Taylor

4 April 2017 31	Manchester United	1–1	Everton	Manchester
20:00 BST	Young (yellow card) 57'; Ibrahimović 90+4' (pen.)	Report	Jagielka 22'; Gueye (yellow card) 45'; Barry (yellow card) 54'; Davies (yellow card) 88'; Williams (red card) 90+3'	Stadium: Old Trafford; Attendance: 75,272; Referee: Neil Swarbrick

9 April 2017 32	Everton	4–2	Leicester City	Liverpool
16:00 BST	Davies 1'; Lukaku 23', 57'; Mirallas (yellow card) 29'; Jagielka 41'; Baines (yellow card) 45'	Report	Slimani 4'; Albrighton 10'; King (yellow card) 64'	Stadium: Goodison Park; Attendance: 39,573; Referee: Bobby Madley

15 April 2017 33	Everton	3–1	Burnley	Liverpool
15:00 BST	Jagielka 49'; Mee 71' (o.g.); Lukaku 74'	Report	Vokes 52' (pen.)	Stadium: Goodison Park; Attendance: 39,328; Referee: Mark Clattenburg

22 April 2017 34	West Ham United	0–0	Everton	London
15:00 BST	Fernandes (yellow card) 33'; Fonte (yellow card) 76'	Report	Gueye (yellow card) 27'; Williams (yellow card) 61'; Barry (yellow card) 68'	Stadium: London Stadium; Attendance: 56,971; Referee: Roger East

30 April 2017 35	Everton	0–3	Chelsea	Liverpool
14:05 BST	Baines (yellow card) 38'; Valencia (yellow card) 58'; Gueye (yellow card) 78'	Report	Cahill (yellow card) 35', (goal) 79'; Azpilicueta (yellow card) 40'; Costa (yellow card) 56'; Pedro 66'; Matić (yellow card) 75'; Willian 86'	Stadium: Goodison Park; Attendance: 39,595; Referee: Jonathan Moss

6 May 2017 36	Swansea City	1–0	Everton	Swansea
17:30 BST	Llorente 29'	Report		Stadium: Liberty Stadium; Attendance: 20,827; Referee: Martin Atkinson

12 May 2017 37	Everton	1–0	Watford	Liverpool
19:45 BST	Barkley 56'	Report	Behrami (yellow card) 39'; Janmaat (yellow card) 39'; Holebas (yellow card) 70'	Stadium: Goodison Park; Attendance: 38,550; Referee: Kevin Friend

21 May 2017 38	Arsenal	3–1	Everton	Holloway, London
15:00 BST	Bellerín 8'; Koscielny (red card) 14'; Sánchez 27'; Gabriel (yellow card) 51'; Holding (yellow card) 62'; Ramsey 90+1'	Report	Williams (yellow card) 19'; Jagielka (yellow card) 39'; Lukaku 58' (pen.); Schneiderlin (yellow card) 61'; Baines (yellow card) 73'	Stadium: Emirates Stadium; Attendance: 59,976; Referee: Michael Oliver

=== FA Cup ===
7 January 2017 Third round	Everton	1–2	Leicester City	Liverpool
15:00 GMT	Lukaku 63'; Funes Mori (yellow card) 81'	Report	Musa 66', 71'; Kapustka (yellow card) 90'	Stadium: Goodison Park; Attendance: 35,493; Referee: Martin Atkinson

=== EFL Cup ===
23 August 2016 Second round	Everton	4–0	Yeovil Town	Liverpool
19:45 BST	Lennon 28'; Barkley 69'; Koné 83', 90'	Report		Stadium: Goodison Park; Attendance: 24,617; Referee: Christopher Kavanagh

20 September 2016 Third round	Everton	0–2	Norwich City	Liverpool
19:45 BST		Report	Naismith 41'; Jo. Murphy 74'	Stadium: Goodison Park; Attendance: 29,550; Referee: Andrew Madley

== Statistics ==
As of match played 21 May 2017.

No.	Pos	Nat	Player	Total		Premier League		FA Cup		League Cup	
No.	Pos	Nat	Player	Apps	Goals	Apps	Goals	Apps	Goals	Apps	Goals
1	GK	(Spain) ESP	Joel Robles	21	0	19+1	0	1	0	0	0
2	MF	(France) FRA	Morgan Schneiderlin	14	1	12+2	1	0	0	0	0
3	DF	(England) ENG	Leighton Baines	33	2	32	2	1	0	0	0
4	MF	(Republic of Ireland) IRL	Darron Gibson	1	0	0	0	0	0	0+1	0
5	DF	(Wales) WAL	Ashley Williams	39	1	35+1	1	1	0	2	0
6	DF	(England) ENG	Phil Jagielka	27	3	25+2	3	0	0	0	0
7	FW	(Spain) ESP	Gerard Deulofeu	12	0	4+6	0	0+1	0	1	0
8	MF	(England) ENG	Ross Barkley	39	6	32+4	5	1	0	2	1
9	FW	(Ivory Coast) CIV	Arouna Koné	9	2	0+6	0	0+1	0	0+2	2
10	FW	(Belgium) BEL	Romelu Lukaku	39	26	36+1	25	1	1	1	0
11	FW	(Belgium) BEL	Kevin Mirallas	37	4	23+12	4	0+1	0	0+1	0
12	MF	(England) ENG	Aaron Lennon	13	1	6+5	0	0	0	2	1
14	MF	(Democratic Republic of the Congo) COD	Yannick Bolasie	15	1	12+1	1	0	0	1+1	0
15	MF	(England) ENG	Tom Cleverley	12	0	4+6	0	0	0	1+1	0
16	MF	(Republic of Ireland) IRL	James McCarthy	13	1	7+5	1	0	0	1	0
17	MF	(Senegal) SEN	Idrissa Gueye	35	1	32+1	1	0	0	2	0
18	MF	(England) ENG	Gareth Barry	34	2	23+10	2	1	0	0	0
19	FW	(Ecuador) ECU	Enner Valencia	23	3	5+16	3	1	0	1	0
20	DF	(Costa Rica) CRC	Bryan Oviedo	7	0	6	0	0	0	1	0
21	MF	(Bosnia and Herzegovina) BIH	Muhamed Bešić	0	0	0	0	0	0	0	0
22	GK	(Netherlands) NED	Maarten Stekelenburg	21	0	19	0	0	0	2	0
23	DF	(Republic of Ireland) IRL	Séamus Coleman	28	4	26	4	1	0	1	0
25	DF	(Argentina) ARG	Ramiro Funes Mori	26	0	16+7	0	1	0	2	0
26	MF	(England) ENG	Tom Davies	25	2	18+6	2	1	0	0	0
27	DF	(England) ENG	Tyias Browning	0	0	0	0	0	0	0	0
28	MF	(England) ENG	Kieran Dowell	0	0	0	0	0	0	0	0
29	FW	(England) ENG	Dominic Calvert-Lewin	11	1	5+6	1	0	0	0	0
30	DF	(England) ENG	Mason Holgate	21	0	16+2	0	1	0	2	0
31	FW	(England) ENG	Ademola Lookman	8	1	3+5	1	0	0	0	0
32	DF	(England) ENG	Brendan Galloway	0	0	0	0	0	0	0	0
38	DF	(England) ENG	Matthew Pennington	3	1	2+1	1	0	0	0	0
43	DF	(England) ENG	Jonjoe Kenny	1	0	0+1	0	0	0	0	0
