= 2016 Dresden Cup =

Tournament details
- Host country: Germany
- Dates: 29–30 July
- Teams: 4 (from 1 confederation)
- Venue: 1 (in 1 host city)

Tournament statistics
- Matches played: 4

The 2016 Dresden Cup was a summer football friendly tournament organized by German club Dynamo Dresden and Match IQ. It was hosted at the Stadion Dresden in Dresden, from 29 to 30 July 2016. Besides the hosts, three other European teams took part: Everton (England), Real Betis (Spain), and Werder Bremen (Germany). Betis' participation was also a part of their LFP World Challenge campaign.

== Overview ==
=== Participants ===
Nation	Team	Location	Confederation	League
Germany	Dynamo Dresden	Dresden	UEFA	2. Bundesliga
England	Everton	Liverpool	UEFA	Premier League
Spain	Real Betis	Seville	UEFA	La Liga
Germany	Werder Bremen	Bremen	UEFA	Bundesliga

=== Standings ===
Each team played two matches, with three points awarded for a win and zero points for a defeat. There were no draws as the game will go to penalties if the game ends in a draw after 90 mins. Also, each goal contributed a point to the team, regardless of whether the team won or lost.

Pos	Team	Pld	W	L	GF	GA	GD	Pts	Final result
1	(Spain) Real Betis	2	2	0	2	1	+1	8	2016 Osnabrück Football Summer Champions
2	(Germany) Dynamo Dresden (H)	2	1	1	3	2	+1	6	
3	(Germany) Werder Bremen	2	1	1	1	2	−1	4	
4	(England) Everton	2	0	2	2	3	−1	2	

Source: Dynamo Dresden
Rules for classification: 1) Points; 2) Goal difference; 3) Head to head result
(H) Hosts

=== Matches ===
29 July 2016
18:00 CEST

Werder Bremen (Germany)	0–1	(Spain) Real Betis
	Report	Nahuel 67'

Stadion Dresden, Dresden

29 July 2016
20:30 CEST

Dynamo Dresden (Germany)	2–1	(England) Everton
Hauptmann 14'; Testroet 65'	Report	Deulofeu 40'

Stadion Dresden, Dresden
Attendance: 12,353

30 July 2016
13:30 CEST

Real Betis (Spain)	1–1	(England) Everton
Pezzella 23'	Report	Mandi 13' (o.g.)
Penalties
Ceballos (penalty missed); Durmisi (penalty scored); Sanabria (penalty scored); Martin (penalty scored); Musonda (penalty scored)	4–3	(penalty missed) Grant; (penalty missed) Dowell; (penalty scored) Stones; (penalty scored) Bešić; (penalty scored) Holgate

Stadion Dresden, Dresden

30 July 2016
16:00 CEST

Dynamo Dresden (Germany)	1–1	(Germany) Werder Bremen
Kutschke 82'	Report	J. Eggestein 87'
Penalties
Kutschke (penalty scored); Väyrynen (penalty scored); Hilßner (penalty missed); Kreuzer (penalty missed); Hartmann (penalty scored)	3–4	(penalty scored) Sternberg; (penalty scored) Hajrović; (penalty missed) U. Garcia; (penalty scored) Petsos; (penalty scored) J. Eggestein

Stadion Dresden, Dresden
Attendance: 13,852
Referee: Steffen Mix
