= Dominic Calvert-Lewin =

English footballer (born 1997)

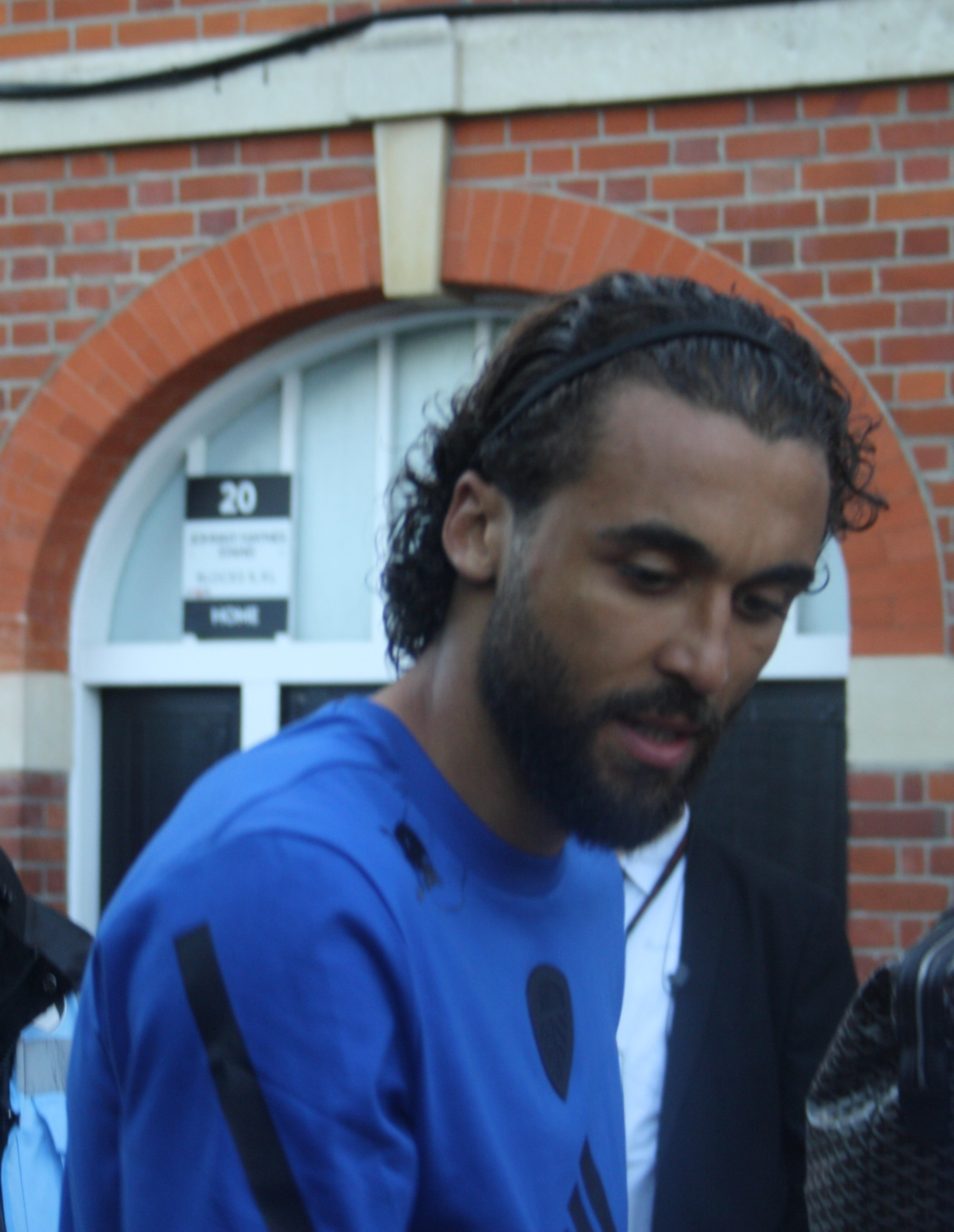
- Calvert-Lewin with Leeds United in 2025

Personal information
- Full name: Dominic Nathaniel Calvert-Lewin
- Date of birth: 16 March 1997 (age 29)
- Place of birth: Sheffield, England
- Height: 6 ft 2 in (1.87 m)
- Position: Striker

Team information
- Current team: Leeds United
- Number: 9

Youth career
- 2005–2014: Sheffield United

Senior career*
Years	Team	Apps	(Gls)
2014–2016	Sheffield United	11	(0)
2014–2015	→ Stalybridge Celtic (loan)	5	(6)
2015–2016	→ Northampton Town (loan)	20	(5)
2016–2025	Everton	239	(57)
2025–	Leeds United	46	(19)

International career^{‡}
2016–2017	England U20	15	(6)
2017–2019	England U21	17	(7)
2020–	England	15	(4)
Medal record
Men's football
Representing England
FIFA U-20 World Cup
Winner	2017 South Korea
UEFA European Championship
Runner-up	2020 Europe
- * Club domestic league appearances and goals as of 17:40, 21 November 2026 (UTC) ‡ National team caps and goals as of 21:55, 15 November 2026 (UTC)

Dominic Nathaniel Calvert-Lewin (born 16 March 1997) is an English professional footballer who plays as a striker for Premier League club Leeds United and the England national team.

Calvert-Lewin began his career at local club Sheffield United, making his senior debut on loan at Conference North club Stalybridge Celtic in December 2014. He spent the first half of the 2015–16 season on loan at Northampton Town in League Two, and in August 2016, he joined Everton for a fee of £1.5 million. He played 273 games and scored 71 goals for Everton before joining Leeds United in 2025.

Calvert-Lewin was part of the England under-20 team that won the 2017 FIFA U-20 World Cup, scoring the winning goal in the final. He made his debut for the England national team in October 2020 and subsequently scored in a 3–0 friendly win against Wales at Wembley Stadium. Calvert-Lewin represented England in UEFA Euro 2020; after 2021, he was recalled to the national team in 2026 after a five-year absence.

== Club career ==
=== Sheffield United ===
Calvert-Lewin joined the Youth Academy of Sheffield United on 28 April 2005. After progressing through the ranks of Sheffield United youth team, he signed a scholarship with the academy when he was sixteen. At this level, he played as a box-to-box midfielder.

Calvert-Lewin appeared in the first team as an unused substitute, in a 2–1 win over Aston Villa in the third round of FA Cup on 4 January 2014. After this, he was awarded for the League Football Education's 'The 11'.

On 24 December 2014, Calvert-Lewin was loaned out to Conference North team Stalybridge Celtic for a youth loan, where he began to play as a centre forward. Two days later, he scored twice on his debut, in a 4–2 win at Hyde United and scored against them again in the reverse fixture on 1 January, in a 7–1 win. At the beginning of February 2015, Calvert-Lewin returned to his parent club, having scored six times in five appearances.

In early April 2015, he signed a new long-term deal to keep him contracted to Sheffield United until summer 2018. Calvert-Lewin made his professional debut for the senior team on 25 April in League One, in a 1–1 draw away at Leyton Orient as a 66th-minute substitute. At the end of the 2014–15 season, he went on to make two appearances. In the club's pre-season tour ahead of the 2015–16 season, Calvert-Lewin scored in a friendly match, in a 1–0 win over Ilkeston on 9 July.

On 7 August 2015, Calvert-Lewin joined League Two club Northampton Town on loan until January. He made his debut four days later, scoring in a 3–0 home win against Blackpool in the first round of the Football League Cup. Despite being keen to extend his loan at the club, this did not materialise. By the time he left, he had made 26 appearances and scored eight times across all competitions.

After his loan spell at Northampton Town came to an end in January 2016, Calvert-Lewin returned to the first team at Sheffield United, and made his first appearance on 13 February, in a 1–0 win over Doncaster Rovers.

Calvert-Lewin started the 2016–17 season appearing for Sheffield United as a substitute in a 2–1 loss to Crewe Alexandra in the first round of the EFL Cup on 9 August.

=== Everton ===
Calvert-Lewin signed for Premier League club Everton for a transfer fee of £1.5 million on 31 August 2016. He later reflected on the move as "simply too good to resist."

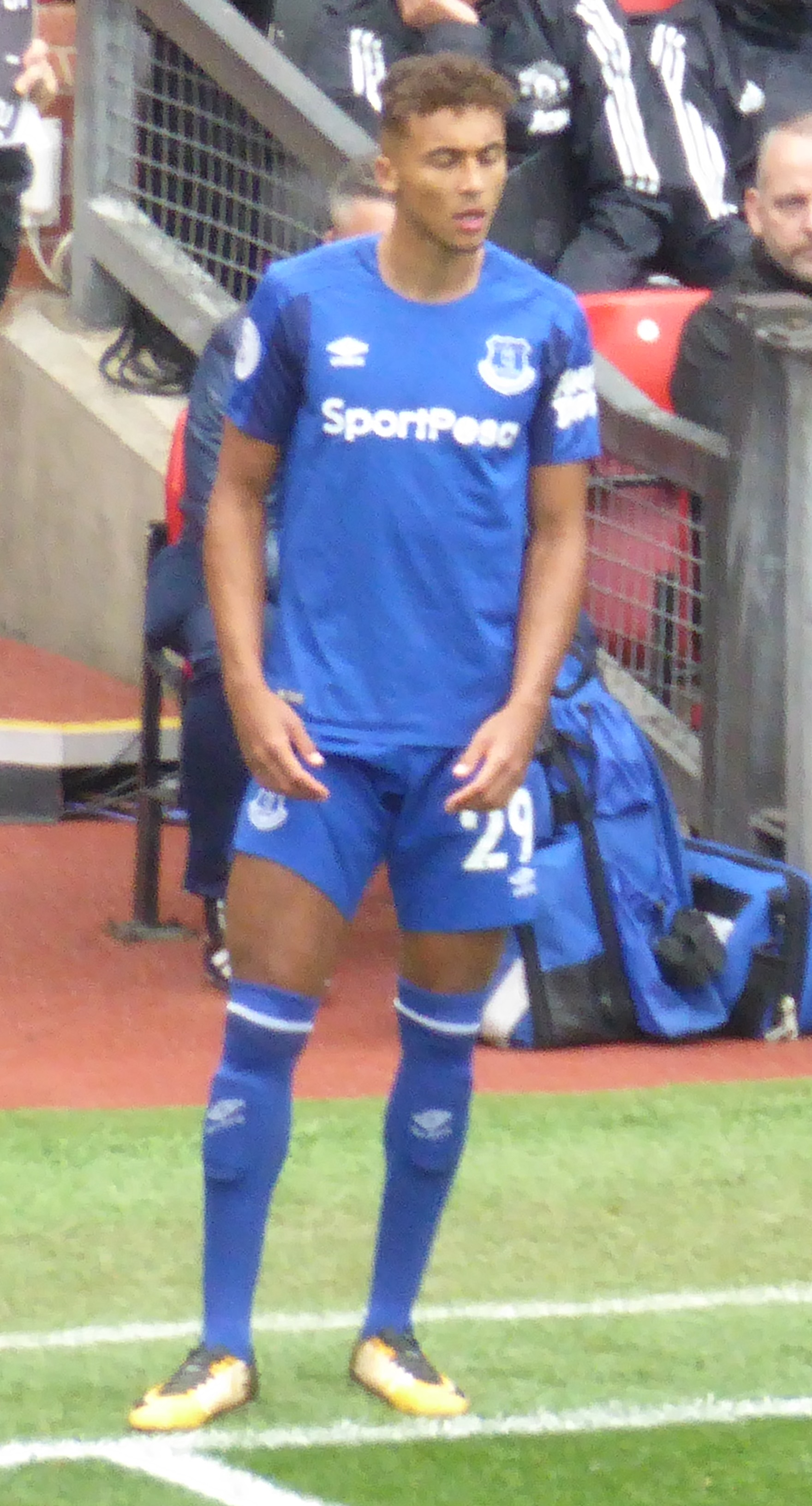
Calvert-Lewin playing for Everton in 2017

He made his debut as a substitute in a 2–1 win over Arsenal on 13 December 2016, playing 11 minutes as a substitute for Enner Valencia. On 2 January 2017, he made his first start for Everton in a 3–0 win at Southampton but was substituted after 12 minutes with an ankle injury which led to him missing the next two months of the season. He returned from injury as an 84th minute substitute in a 3–0 win against West Bromwich Albion on 11 March and scored his first Everton goal in the ninth minute of a 4–0 win against Hull City on 18 March. On 3 May 2017, he signed a new five-year contract with Everton.

Following his U-20 World Cup performance, BBC Sport expected Calvert-Lewin to make a first team breakthrough ahead of the 2017–18 season. He scored the winning goal for Everton in their Europa League third qualifying round second leg against Slovak team MFK Ružomberok on 3 August 2017. He was then named in the starting line-up for Everton's first two matches of the Premier League season, assisting Wayne Rooney's goals against Stoke City and Manchester City. He scored his first brace for the club in the third round of the EFL Cup against Sunderland on 20 September, ending a run of three games in which Everton did not score. His first league goal of the season came in a 3–2 win over Watford on 5 November, scoring Everton's second goal in the 74th minute, six minutes after being substituted on. Calvert-Lewin signed a new contract with Everton on 14 December, along with fellow youngsters Jonjoe Kenny and Mason Holgate, keeping him at Goodison Park until June 2023.

Ahead of the 2019–20 season, Calvert-Lewin was assigned the squad number 9, having worn the number 29 in his first three seasons at the club. On 24 September 2019, in his 100th Everton match, Calvert-Lewin scored both goals of a win at Sheffield Wednesday – rivals of his first club Sheffield United – in the third round of the EFL Cup. The following 6 March, he signed a new deal to last until June 2025. He ended the 2019–20 season as Everton's joint top goalscorer with 15 goals in all competitions.

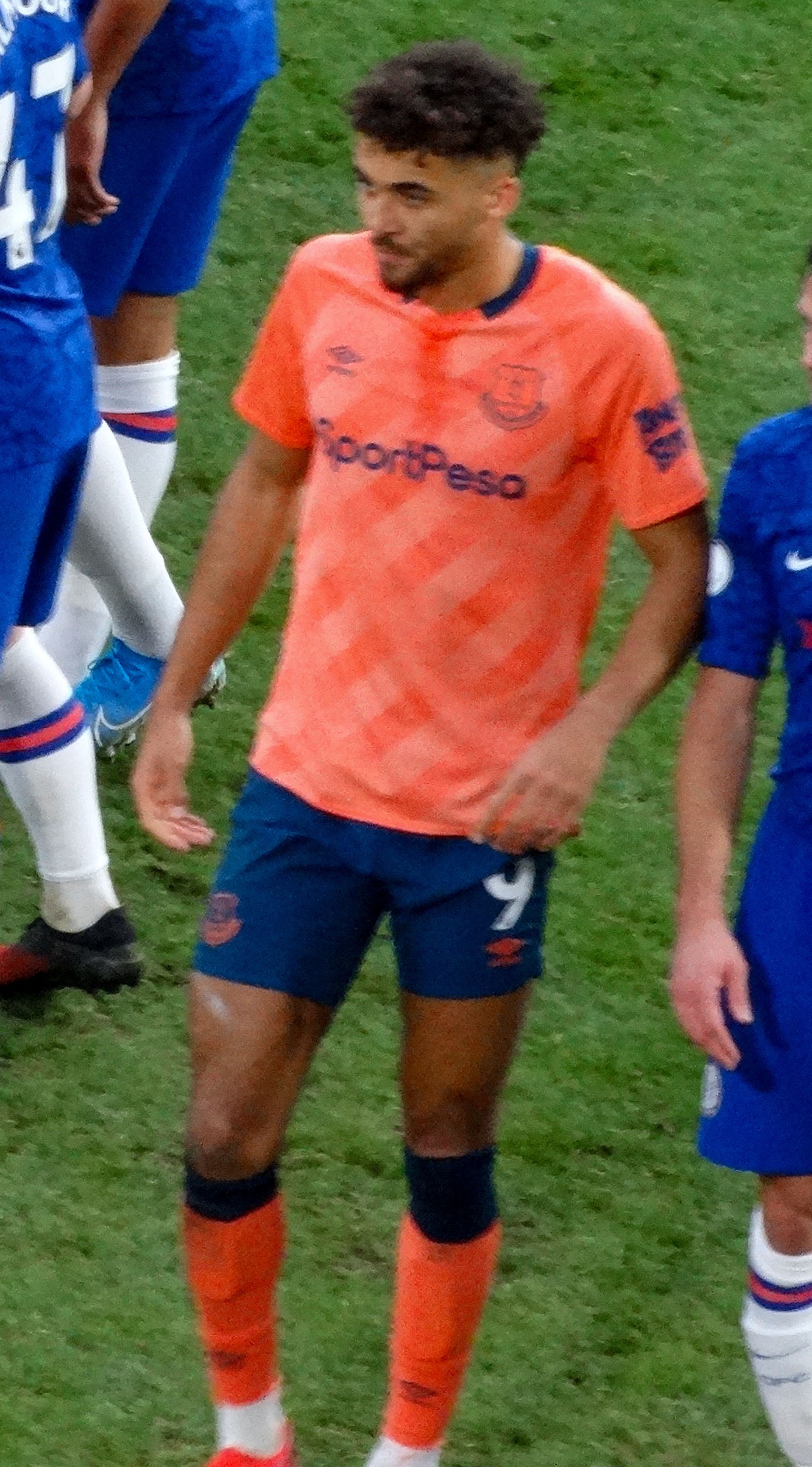
Calvert-Lewin playing for Everton in 2020

Calvert-Lewin started the 2020–21 season by scoring the winning goal in a 1–0 win over Tottenham Hotspur on 13 September 2020, followed by his first Premier League hat-trick in a 5–2 victory over West Bromwich Albion on 19 September and the opening goal of a 2–1 win at Crystal Palace on 26 September. On 30 September, he scored a hat-trick in a 4–1 win against West Ham United in the EFL Cup, making him the first Everton player to score two hat-tricks in one month since Dixie Dean in November 1931. He was named as the Premier League Player of the Month for September 2020 after scoring five league goals that month. Calvert-Lewin scored in a fourth consecutive league game with a header against Brighton & Hove Albion in a 4–2 home victory on 3 October and a fifth consecutive game with another header against Liverpool in a 2–2 draw at Goodison Park two weeks later. He scored another brace, taking him to 10 league goals for the season, in a 3–2 away win against Fulham on 22 November 2020. On 10 February 2021, Calvert-Lewin scored his 50th goal for Everton in a 5–4 win against Tottenham Hotspur in the fifth round of the FA Cup. He finished the 2020–21 season as Everton's top goalscorer with 21 goals in 39 matches in all competitions and was named Everton's Player of the Year at the club's end of season awards evening.

After scoring in Everton's first three matches of the 2021–22 season, Calvert-Lewin sustained a fractured toe and quadriceps injury which kept him off the field for the remainder of 2021. On 2 January 2022, he returned to the Everton team in a 3–2 home loss to Brighton & Hove Albion, missing a penalty kick in the 25th minute. On 15 May 2022, he scored his first goal since the previous August in a 3–2 loss to Brentford. Four days later, he scored the winning goal in a 3–2 victory over Crystal Palace, securing Everton's safety from relegation from the Premier League.

Prior to the start of the 2022–23 season, Calvert-Lewin suffered a knee injury and did not play until Everton's 2–1 home loss to Manchester United on 9 October 2022. He was absent again with hamstring issues between February and April 2023 as the team, who did not sign any forwards in January, fought relegation.

On 29 October 2023, he scored his 50th Premier League goal in a 1–0 win at West Ham United. On 4 January 2024, Calvert-Lewin received his first career red card in a 0–0 draw with Crystal Palace in the third round of the FA Cup. The red card was subsequently overturned by the FA after an appeal by Everton. On 2 April 2024, he scored his first goal in over five months, converting an 88th penalty kick to give Everton a 1–1 draw at Newcastle United. Four days later, he scored the only goal in a relegation battle against Burnley, Everton's first win in 13 matches. On 24 April, Calvert-Lewin scored Everton's second goal in a 2–0 win over Liverpool, the first time Everton had beaten Liverpool at Goodison Park since October 2010.

On 19 January 2025, Calvert-Lewin scored his first goal in 16 matches, scoring the opener in the 3–2 win against Tottenham Hotspur at Goodison Park. It was David Moyes' first victory since returning to the club. The win ended Everton's six-match winless streak in the Premier League and lifted the club four points clear from the relegation zone. On 29 June, Calvert-Lewin announced that he had made the "incredibly difficult decision" to depart Everton, after nine years with them, upon the expiry of his contract at the end of the month.

=== Leeds United ===
On 15 August 2025, newly promoted Premier League club Leeds United announced the signing of Calvert-Lewin on a three-year deal. On 20 September, Calvert-Lewin scored his first goal for Leeds in a 3–1 comeback victory over Wolverhampton Wanderers at Molineux. Calvert-Lewin then scored seven goals in six consecutive matches; The 3–2 loss to Manchester City, the 3–1 win over Chelsea, the 3–3 draw with Liverpool, the 1–1 draw with Brentford, a brace in the 4–1 win over Crystal Palace, and a goal in the 1–1 draw against Sunderland. Calvert-Lewin was later named as the Premier League Player of the Month for December 2025. He became the first Leeds United player to have won the award since Rio Ferdinand in October 2001. On 6 February 2026, Calvert-Lewin scored his 10th goal of the 2025–26 season in a 3–1 victory against Nottingham Forest at Elland Road. He became the first Englishman to score at least 10 league goals in their first campaign with Leeds United since Matt Smith during the 2013–14 season in the EFL Championship.

== International career ==
=== Youth ===
Calvert-Lewin played youth international football for England at under-20 and under-21 levels. In total, he scored six goals in 15 games for the under-20 team, and seven goals in 17 games for the under-21 team.

Calvert-Lewin made his England under-20 debut on 1 September 2016, in a 1–1 draw against Brazil, which he followed up by scoring in his second appearance, in a 2–1 loss three days later. He later scored against Germany U20 (twice) and Senegal U20.

Calvert-Lewin was selected to play for England in the 2017 FIFA U-20 World Cup in South Korea. He scored two goals in the tournament; his first was the first goal of tournament for England scored in the match against Argentina, the last was the winning goal in the final as they beat Venezuela 1–0. He joined Geoff Hurst and Martin Peters as the only England players to score in a World Cup final.

On 27 May 2019, Calvert-Lewin was included in England's 23-man squad for the 2019 UEFA European Under-21 Championship.

=== Senior ===
Calvert-Lewin received his first England call-up by Gareth Southgate on 1 October 2020 after scoring eight goals in five appearances, including two hat-tricks, for Everton in the opening weeks of the 2020–21 season. He scored with a header in his maiden appearance for England, a 3–0 friendly win against Wales at Wembley Stadium on 8 October. He scored his first brace on 25 March 2021, in a 5–0 win against San Marino.

Calvert-Lewin earned a recall from Thomas Tuchel to the national team in March 2026 for its friendly matches against Uruguay and Japan. In September, Calvert-Lewin was called up again by Tuchel to play in the 2026–27 UEFA Nations League.

== Style of play ==
Sheffield United staff Keith Briggs and Neill Collins reacted positively about Calvert-Lewin, including his attitude, while Chris Short described him as "football mad and a special talent." Manager Nigel Clough said of him: "He's a big lad who is good technically for the stage he's at and he's going to win headers against anybody", while manager Nigel Adkins described Calvert-Lewin's impressive performance in a training session: "He took the ball with his back to goal, controlled it and popped an overhead kick straight in the top corner. Brilliant stuff." Carlo Ancelotti, who managed Calvert-Lewin at Everton, suggested that he has all the qualities to be a top striker: "He is fantastic with the head, clever in the box and sharp. I think he is going to be at the top in England and in Europe."

== Personal life ==
Born and brought up in Sheffield, South Yorkshire, Calvert-Lewin is of Jamaican descent through his father. He supported Sheffield United. During his time at Northampton Town, he resided with his teammate Ryan Cresswell and developed a good friendship.

Calvert-Lewin has been noted by fashion journalists for his choice of clothing, and in November 2021 he appeared on the front cover of Arena Homme + wearing a suit, flared shorts and a pink Prada handbag. In April 2022, he featured in British GQ with a Chanel handbag from his own collection. In February 2020, he and Everton teammate Tom Davies used a break in the season to attend New York Fashion Week.

In May 2022, Calvert-Lewin spoke out about his mental health problems.

Calvert-Lewin married Sandra Jerze in March 2025. They have a daughter, born in 2023.

== Career statistics ==
=== Club ===
As of match played 21 November 2026

Appearances and goals by club, season and competition
Club	Season	League			FA Cup		League Cup		Europe		Other		Total	
Club	Season	Division	Apps	Goals	Apps	Goals	Apps	Goals	Apps	Goals	Apps	Goals	Apps	Goals
Sheffield United	2014–15	League One	2	0	0	0	0	0	—		0	0	2	0
Sheffield United	2015–16	League One	9	0	—		—		—		—		9	0
Sheffield United	2016–17	League One	0	0	—		1	0	—		0	0	1	0
Sheffield United	Total		11	0	0	0	1	0	—		0	0	12	0
Stalybridge Celtic (loan)	2014–15	Conference North	5	6	—		—		—		—		5	6
Northampton Town (loan)	2015–16	League Two	20	5	2	1	2	1	—		2 (Note: Appearances in Football League Trophy)	1	26	8
Everton	2016–17	Premier League	11	1	0	0	—		—		—		11	1
Everton	2017–18	Premier League	32	4	1	0	2	3	9 (Note: Appearances in UEFA Europa League)	1	—		44	8
Everton	2018–19	Premier League	35	6	2	0	1	2	—		—		38	8
Everton	2019–20	Premier League	36	13	1	0	4	2	—		—		41	15
Everton	2020–21	Premier League	33	16	3	2	3	3	—		—		39	21
Everton	2021–22	Premier League	17	5	1	0	0	0	—		—		18	5
Everton	2022–23	Premier League	17	2	1	0	0	0	—		—		18	2
Everton	2023–24	Premier League	32	7	3	0	3	1	—		—		38	8
Everton	2024–25	Premier League	26	3	0	0	0	0	—		—		26	3
Everton	Total		239	57	12	2	13	11	9	1	—		273	71
Leeds United	2025–26	Premier League	35	14	3	1	1	0	—		—		39	15
Leeds United	2026–27	Premier League	11	5	0	0	2	1	—		—		13	6
Leeds United	Total		46	19	3	1	3	1	—		—		52	21
Career total			321	87	17	4	19	13	9	1	2	1	368	106

=== International ===
As of match played 15 November 2026

Appearances and goals by national team and year
National team	Year	Apps	Goals
England	2020	5	2
England	2021	6	2
England	2026	4	0
Total		15	4

As of match played 27 March 2026. England score listed first, score column indicates score after each Calvert-Lewin goal.

List of international goals scored by Dominic Calvert-Lewin
No.	Date	Venue	Cap	Opponent	Score	Result	Competition	Ref.
1	8 October 2020	Wembley Stadium, London, England	1	Wales	1–0	3–0	Friendly	
2	12 November 2020	Wembley Stadium, London, England	4	Republic of Ireland	3–0	3–0	Friendly	
3	25 March 2021	Wembley Stadium, London, England	6	San Marino	2–0	5–0	2022 FIFA World Cup qualification	
4	25 March 2021	Wembley Stadium, London, England	6	San Marino	4–0	5–0	2022 FIFA World Cup qualification	

== Honours ==
Northampton Town

- Football League Two: 2015–16

England U20

- FIFA U-20 World Cup: 2017

England

- UEFA European Championship runner-up: 2020

Individual

- England Under-21 Player of the Year: 2018
- Premier League Player of the Month: September 2020, December 2025
- Everton Player of the Season: 2020–21
- BBC Goal of the Month: December 2025
