= 2020–21 Everton F.C. season =

English football club season

Everton
2020–21 season
- Owner: Farhad Moshiri
- Chairman: Bill Kenwright
- Manager: Carlo Ancelotti
- Stadium: Goodison Park
- Premier League: 10th
- FA Cup: Quarter-Final
- EFL Cup: Quarter-Final
- Top goalscorer: League: Dominic Calvert-Lewin (16); All: Dominic Calvert-Lewin (21)
Home colours	Away colours	Third colours

The 2020–21 Everton Football Club season was the club's 118th season in existence and the club's 67th consecutive season in the top flight of English football. In addition to the domestic league, Everton participated in this season's editions of the FA Cup and the EFL Cup.

== Kits ==
Home	Alt. Home	Alt. Home 2

Alt. Home 3	Away	Third

== Transfers ==
=== Transfers in ===
Date	Position	Nationality	Name	From	Fee	Team	Ref.
2 July 2020	LB	(France)	Niels Nkounkou	(France) Marseille	Free	First team	
5 September 2020	DM	(Brazil)	Allan	(Italy) Napoli	£21,700,000	First team	
7 September 2020	AM	(Colombia)	James Rodríguez	(Spain) Real Madrid	Free	First team	
8 September 2020	CM	(Mali)	Abdoulaye Doucouré	(England) Watford	£20,000,000	First team	
4 October 2020	DM	(Sweden)	Imam Jagne	(Sweden) BK Häcken	Undisclosed	Academy	
5 October 2020	CB	(England)	Ben Godfrey	(England) Norwich City	£20,000,000	First team	
1 February 2021	FW	(Norway)	Joshua King	(England) Bournemouth	Nominal	First team	

=== Loans in ===
Date	Position	Nationality	Name	From	Date Until	Team	Ref.
5 October 2020	GK	(Sweden)	Robin Olsen	(Italy) Roma	End of Season	First team	

=== Transfers out ===
Date	Position	Nationality	Name	To	Fee	Team	Ref.
1 July 2020	RW	(Nigeria)	Korede Adedoyin	(England) Sheffield Wednesday	Free	Under-23s	
1 July 2020	LB	(Italy)	Jonathan Anderson	(Wales) Caernarfon Town	Free	Academy	
1 July 2020	RW	(France)	Mohamed-Ali Cho	(France) Angers	Free	Academy	
1 July 2020	DM	(England)	Alex Denny	(England) Salford City	Free	Under-23s	
1 July 2020	CB	(England)	Morgan Feeney	(England) Sunderland	Free	Under-23s	
1 July 2020	LB	(England)	Matty Foulds	(Italy) Como 1907	Free	Under-23s	
1 July 2020	LB	(England)	Luke Garbutt	(England) Blackpool	Free	First team	
1 July 2020	ST	(Scotland)	Fraser Hornby	(France) Reims	£1,800,000	Under-23s	
1 July 2020	RB	(Wales)	Joshua Hosie	(United States) Furman Paladins	Released	Academy	
1 July 2020	CF	(England)	Manasse Mampala	(England) Queens Park Rangers	Free	Under-23s	
1 July 2020	RB	(Curaçao)	Cuco Martina	Unattached	Released	First team	
1 July 2020	CF	(Senegal)	Oumar Niasse	(England) Huddersfield Town	Released	First team	
1 July 2020	GK	(Republic of Ireland)	Daniel Rose	(Germany) Schalke 04	Free	Academy	
1 July 2020	DM	(France)	Morgan Schneiderlin	(France) Nice	£2,000,000	First team	
13 July 2020	CF	(England)	Kieran Phillips	(England) Huddersfield Town	Free	Under-23s	
26 July 2020	LB	(England)	Leighton Baines	Retired		First team	
30 July 2020	AM	(England)	Kieran Dowell	(England) Norwich City	£2,200,000	First team	
1 August 2020	GK	(Netherlands)	Maarten Stekelenburg	(Netherlands) Ajax	Free	First team	
5 October 2020	ST	(Spain)	Sandro Ramirez	(Spain) Huesca	Free	First team	
13 October 2020	ST	(Switzerland)	Shani Tarashaj	(Switzerland) Zürich	Released	Under-23s	
1 February 2021	GK	(Denmark)	Jonas Lossl	(Denmark) FC Midtjylland	Free	First team	

=== Loans out ===
Date from	Position	Nationality	Name	To	Date until	Team	Ref.
8 August 2019	ST	(Switzerland)	Shani Tarashaj	(Netherlands) FC Emmen	13 October 2020 (Note: Shani Tarashaj left Everton after his loan cancellation.)	Under-23s	
28 July 2020	DM	(Netherlands)	Nathangelo Markelo	(Netherlands) FC Twente	End of season	Under-23s	
22 September 2020	CB	(England)	Lewis Gibson	(England) Reading	End of season	Under-23s	
25 September 2020	CM	(England)	Dennis Adeniran	(England) Wycombe Wanderers	End of season	Under-23s	
4 October 2020	CF	(Italy)	Moise Kean	(France) Paris Saint-Germain	End of season	First team	
5 October 2020	RW	(England)	Theo Walcott	(England) Southampton	End of season	First team	
16 October 2020	DM	(England)	Callum Connolly	(England) Fleetwood Town	End of season	Under-23s	
31 December 2020	CB	(England)	Matthew Pennington	(England) Shrewsbury Town	End of season	Under-23s	
14 January 2021	CB	(England)	Jarrad Branthwaite	(England) Blackburn Rovers	End of season	First team	
20 January 2021	CF	(England)	Ellis Simms	(England) Blackpool	End of season	Under-23s	
28 January 2021	LW	(Democratic Republic of the Congo)	Yannick Bolasie	(England) Middlesbrough	End of season	First team	
1 February 2021	CF	(Turkey)	Cenk Tosun	(Turkey) Beşiktaş	End of season	First team	
1 February 2021	RB	(England)	Jonjoe Kenny	(Scotland) Celtic	End of season	First team	
1 February 2021	RW	(England)	Anthony Gordon	(England) Preston North End	End of season	First team	
1 February 2021	DM	(Democratic Republic of the Congo)	Beni Baningime	(England) Derby County	End of season	Under-23s	

== Pre-season and friendlies ==
Win Draw Loss Fixtures

22 August 2020 Friendly	Blackpool	3–3	Everton	Blackpool, England
15:00 BST	Hamilton 1'; Kaikai 10'; Ward 11'	Report	Calvert-Lewin 23'; Sigurðsson 30' (pen.), 72'	Stadium: Bloomfield Road; Attendance: 0

5 September 2020 Friendly	Everton	2–0	Preston North End	Walton, England
15:00 BST	Kenny 7'; Calvert-Lewin 65'	Report		Stadium: Goodison Park; Attendance: 0 Referee: Robert Jones

== Competitions ==
=== Overview ===
Competition	First match	Last match	Starting round	Final position	Record							
Competition	First match	Last match	Starting round	Final position	Pld	W	D	L	GF	GA	GD	Win %
Premier League	13 September 2020	23 May 2021	Matchday 1	10th	38	17	8	13	47	48	−1	44.74
FA Cup	9 January 2021	20 March 2021	Third round	Quarter-finals	4	3	0	1	10	7	+3	75.00
EFL Cup	16 September 2020	23 December 2020	Second round	Quarter-finals	4	3	0	1	12	5	+7	75.00
Total					46	23	8	15	69	60	+9	50.00

Source: Soccerway

=== Premier League ===
==== League table ====
Pos	Team	Pld	W	D	L	GF	GA	GD	Pts
8	Arsenal	38	18	7	13	55	39	+16	61
9	Leeds United	38	18	5	15	62	54	+8	59
10	Everton	38	17	8	13	47	48	−1	59
11	Aston Villa	38	16	7	15	55	46	+9	55
12	Newcastle United	38	12	9	17	46	62	−16	45

Source: Premier League
Rules for classification: 1) Points; 2) Goal difference; 3) Goals scored; 4) If the champions, relegated teams or qualified teams for UEFA competitions cannot be determined by rules 1 to 3, rules 4.1 to 4.3 are applied – 4.1) Points gained in head-to-head record between such teams; 4.2) Away goals scored in head-to-head record between such teams; 4.3) Play-offs

==== Results summary ====
Overall								Home						Away					
Pld	W	D	L	GF	GA	GD	Pts	W	D	L	GF	GA	GD	W	D	L	GF	GA	GD
38	17	8	13	47	48	−1	59	6	4	9	24	28	−4	11	4	4	23	20	+3

Source: Premier League

==== Results by matchday ====
Matchday	1	2	3	4	5	6	7	8	9	10	11	12	13	14	15	16	17	18	19	20	21	22	23	24	25	26	27	28	29	30	31	32	33	34	35	36	37	38
Ground	A	H	A	H	H	A	A	H	A	H	A	H	A	H	A	H	H	A	A	H	H	A	A	H	A	H	A	A	H	H	A	H	A	H	A	H	H	A
Result	W	W	W	W	D	L	L	L	W	L	D	W	W	W	W	L	L	W	D	D	L	W	D	L	W	W	W	L	L	D	D	D	W	L	W	L	W	L
Position	7	3	2	1	1	1	4	7	6	8	9	7	5	4	2	4	7	5	6	7	8	7	7	7	7	7	5	6	8	8	8	8	8	8	8	8	8	10

Source: Premier League
A = Away; H = Home; W = Win; D = Draw; L = Loss

==== Matches ====
The league fixtures were announced on 20 August 2020.

13 September 2020 1	Tottenham Hotspur	0–1	Everton	Tottenham
16:30 BST (UTC+1)	Højbjerg (yellow card) 85'	Report	Calvert-Lewin 55'	Stadium: Tottenham Hotspur Stadium; Attendance: 0 Referee: Martin Atkinson

19 September 2020 2	Everton	5–2	West Bromwich Albion	Liverpool
12:30 BST (UTC+1)	Doucouré (yellow card) 16'; Calvert-Lewin 31', 62', 66'; Rodríguez 45'; Keane 54'	Report	Diangana 10'; Gibbs (red card) 45+1'; Pereira 47'	Stadium: Goodison Park; Attendance: 0 Referee: Mike Dean

26 September 2020 3	Crystal Palace	1–2	Everton	London
15:00 BST (UTC+1)	Zaha (yellow card) 23'; Kouyaté 26'; McArthur (yellow card) 45+3'; Ward (yellow card) 58'	Report	Calvert-Lewin 10'; Richarlison 40' (pen.), (yellow card) 60'	Stadium: Selhurst Park; Attendance: 0 Referee: Kevin Friend

3 October 2020 4	Everton	4–2	Brighton & Hove Albion	Liverpool
15:00 BST (UTC+1)	Calvert-Lewin 16'; Mina 45+2'; Rodríguez 52', 70'	Report	Alzate (yellow card) 4'; Maupay 41'; Bissouma 90+2'	Stadium: Goodison Park; Attendance: 0 Referee: Simon Hooper

17 October 2020 5	Everton	2–2	Liverpool	Liverpool
12:30 BST (UTC+1)	Keane 19'; Rodríguez (yellow card) 45'; Gomes (yellow card) 69'; Calvert-Lewin 81'; Allan (yellow card) 84'; Richarlison (red card) 90'	Report	Mané 3', (yellow card) 67'; Salah 72'; Fabinho (yellow card) 84'	Stadium: Goodison Park; Attendance: 0 Referee: Michael Oliver

25 October 2020 6	Southampton	2–0	Everton	Southampton
14:00 GMT (UTC±0)	Ward-Prowse 27'; Adams 35'; Walker-Peters (yellow card) 57'	Report	Bernard (yellow card) 64'; Digne (red card) 72'; Calvert-Lewin (yellow card) 90+2'	Stadium: St Mary's Stadium; Attendance: 0 Referee: Kevin Friend

1 November 2020 7	Newcastle United	2–1	Everton	Newcastle upon Tyne
14:00 GMT (UTC±0)	C. Wilson (yellow card) 55', (goal) 56' (pen.), 84'; Murphy (yellow card) 90+5'	Report	Nkounkou (yellow card) 32'; Mina (yellow card) 70'; Allan (yellow card) 72'; Doucouré (yellow card) 88'; Calvert-Lewin 90+2'	Stadium: St James' Park; Attendance: 0 Referee: Stuart Attwell

7 November 2020 8	Everton	1–3	Manchester United	Liverpool
12:30 GMT (UTC±0)	Bernard 19'; Holgate (yellow card) 34'; Allan (yellow card) 45+4'; Tosun (yellow card) 86'; Doucouré (yellow card) 88'	Report	Fernandes 25', 32', (yellow card) 50'; Fred (yellow card) 83'; Cavani 90+5'	Stadium: Goodison Park; Attendance: 0 Referee: Paul Tierney

22 November 2020 9	Fulham	2–3	Everton	Fulham
12:00 GMT (UTC±0)	Reid 15', (yellow card) 29'; Robinson (yellow card) 56'; Cavaleiro (penalty missed) 68'; Loftus-Cheek 70'	Report	Calvert-Lewin 1', 29'; Doucouré 35'	Stadium: Craven Cottage; Attendance: 0 Referee: Andrew Madley

28 November 2020 10	Everton	0–1	Leeds United	Liverpool
17:30 GMT (UTC±0)	Allan (yellow card) 90+2'	Report	Ayling (yellow card) 26'; Raphinha 79'; Cooper (yellow card) 90'	Stadium: Goodison Park; Attendance: 0 Referee: Chris Kavanagh

5 December 2020 11	Burnley	1–1	Everton	Burnley
12:30 GMT (UTC±0)	Brady 3'	Report	Calvert-Lewin 45+3'	Stadium: Turf Moor; Attendance: 0 Referee: Anthony Taylor

12 December 2020 12	Everton	1–0	Chelsea	Liverpool
20:00 GMT (UTC±0)	Sigurðsson 22' (pen.); Richarlison (yellow card) 24'; Doucouré (yellow card) 80'	Report	Kanté (yellow card) 45+3'; James (yellow card) 59'; Thiago Silva (yellow card) 65'	Stadium: Goodison Park; Attendance: 2,000; Referee: Jonathan Moss

16 December 2020 13	Leicester City	0–2	Everton	Leicester
18:00 GMT (UTC±0)	Mendy (yellow card) 15'; Fuchs (yellow card) 87'	Report	Richarlison 21'; Holgate (yellow card) 49', (goal) 72'; Godfrey (yellow card) 49'; Gomes (yellow card) 64'	Stadium: King Power Stadium; Attendance: 0 Referee: Lee Mason

19 December 2020 14	Everton	2–1	Arsenal	Liverpool
17:30 GMT (UTC±0)	Holding 22' (o.g.); Mina 45'; Calvert-Lewin (yellow card) 90+3'	Report	Elneny (yellow card) 15'; Pépé 35' (pen.); Tierney (yellow card) 40'; Willock (yellow card) 90+1'	Stadium: Goodison Park; Attendance: 2,000; Referee: Andre Marriner

26 December 2020 15	Sheffield United	0–1	Everton	Sheffield
20:00 GMT (UTC±0)	Baldock (yellow card) 71'; Robinson (yellow card) 90'	Report	Calvert-Lewin (yellow card) 52'; Sigurðsson 80'; Bernard (yellow card) 81'; Godfrey (yellow card) 89'; Pickford (yellow card) 90+3'	Stadium: Bramall Lane; Attendance: 0 Referee: David Coote

1 January 2021 17	Everton	0–1	West Ham United	Liverpool
17:30 GMT (UTC±0)	Godfrey (yellow card) 59'; Davies (yellow card) 77'	Report	Souček 86'	Stadium: Goodison Park; Attendance: 0 Referee: Kevin Friend

12 January 2021 18	Wolverhampton Wanderers	1–2	Everton	Wolverhampton
20:15 GMT (UTC±0)	Neves 14'; Semedo (yellow card) 89'; Hoever (yellow card) 90+5'	Report	Iwobi 6'; Doucouré (yellow card) 50'; Holgate (yellow card) 69'; Keane 77'	Stadium: Molineux Stadium; Attendance: 0 Referee: Martin Atkinson

27 January 2021 20	Everton	1–1	Leicester City	Liverpool
20:15 GMT (UTC±0)	Rodríguez 30', (yellow card) 63'	Report	Justin (yellow card) 45'; Tielemans 67'	Stadium: Goodison Park; Attendance: 0 Referee: Mike Dean

30 January 2021 21	Everton	0–2	Newcastle United	Liverpool
12:30 GMT (UTC±0)	Sigurðsson (yellow card) 33'; Keane (yellow card) 61'; Rodríguez (yellow card) 79'	Report	Lascelles (yellow card) 4'; Shelvey (yellow card) 21'; Wilson 73', 90+3'; Darlow (yellow card) 84'; Hendrick (yellow card) 88'	Stadium: Goodison Park; Attendance: 0 Referee: Stuart Attwell

3 February 2021 22	Leeds United	1–2	Everton	Leeds
19:30 GMT (UTC±0)	Harrison (yellow card) 16'; Raphinha 48'; Ayling (yellow card) 79'	Report	Sigurðsson 9'; Calvert-Lewin 41'; Holgate (yellow card) 89'; Godfrey (yellow card) 90'; Olsen (yellow card) 90+1'	Stadium: Elland Road; Attendance: 0 Referee: Michael Oliver

6 February 2021 23	Manchester United	3–3	Everton	Old Trafford
20:00 GMT (UTC±0)	Cavani 24'; Fernandes 45'; McTominay 70'; Shaw (yellow card) 73'; Tuanzebe (yellow card) 90+5'	Report	Doucouré 49'; Rodríguez 52'; Keane (yellow card) 80'; Calvert-Lewin 90+5'	Stadium: Old Trafford; Attendance: 0 Referee: Jonathan Moss

14 February 2021 24	Everton	0–2	Fulham	Liverpool
19:00 GMT (UTC±0)	Keane (yellow card) 90+6'	Report	Maja 48', 65'; Onomah (yellow card) 90+6'	Stadium: Goodison Park; Attendance: 0 Referee: Andrew Madley

17 February 2021 16	Everton	1–3	Manchester City	Liverpool
20:15 GMT (UTC±0)	Doucouré (yellow card) 28'; Richarlison 37', (yellow card) 45'	Report	Foden 32'; Mahrez 63'; Sterling (yellow card) 67'; Silva 77'	Stadium: Goodison Park; Attendance: 0 Referee: Andre Marriner
Note: The match was originally scheduled for 28 December 2020, but was postponed due to safety concerns following a COVID-19 outbreak at Manchester City.

20 February 2021 25	Liverpool	0–2	Everton	Liverpool
17:30 GMT (UTC±0)	Kabak (yellow card) 45+1'; Mané (yellow card) 67'	Report	Richarlison 3'; Gomes (yellow card) 41'; Sigurðsson 83' (pen.)	Stadium: Anfield; Attendance: 0 Referee: Chris Kavanagh

1 March 2021 26	Everton	1–0	Southampton	Liverpool
20:00 GMT (UTC±0)	Richarlison 9'	Report	Armstrong (yellow card) 77'; Tella (yellow card) 80'	Stadium: Goodison Park; Attendance: 0 Referee: Martin Atkinson

4 March 2021 27	West Bromwich Albion	0–1	Everton	West Bromwich
18:00 GMT (UTC±0)	O'Shea (yellow card) 60'; Furlong (yellow card) 68'; Yokuşlu (yellow card) 82'	Report	Holgate (yellow card) 37'; Richarlison 65'	Stadium: The Hawthorns; Attendance: 0 Referee: Darren England

8 March 2021 28	Chelsea	2–0	Everton	London
18:00 GMT (UTC±0)	Godfrey 31' (o.g.); Jorginho 65' (pen.)	Report	Holgate (yellow card) 17'; Digne (yellow card) 50'; Davies (yellow card) 90'	Stadium: Stamford Bridge; Attendance: 0 Referee: David Coote

13 March 2021 29	Everton	1–2	Burnley	Liverpool
17:30 GMT (UTC±0)	Calvert-Lewin 32'	Report	Wood 13'; McNeil 24'; Westwood (yellow card) 38'; Lowton (yellow card) 45+2'; Tarkowski (yellow card) 76'; Pope (yellow card) 85'	Stadium: Goodison Park; Attendance: 0 Referee: Jonathan Moss

5 April 2021 30	Everton	1–1	Crystal Palace	Liverpool
18:00 BST (UTC+1)	Mina (yellow card) 15'; Digne (yellow card) 33'; Rodríguez 56'	Report	Batshuayi 86'	Stadium: Goodison Park; Attendance: 0 Referee: Kevin Friend

12 April 2021 31	Brighton & Hove Albion	0–0	Everton	Falmer
20:15 BST (UTC+1)	Dunk (yellow card) 52'	Report	Keane (yellow card) 82'; Holgate (yellow card) 90+2'	Stadium: Falmer Stadium; Attendance: 0 Referee: Darren England

16 April 2021 32	Everton	2–2	Tottenham Hotspur	Liverpool
20:00 BST (UTC+1)	Davies (yellow card) 21'; Sigurðsson 31' (pen.), 62'	Report	Højbjerg (yellow card) 7'; Kane 27', 68'	Stadium: Goodison Park; Attendance: 0 Referee: Michael Oliver

23 April 2021 33	Arsenal	0–1	Everton	Holloway
20:00 BST (UTC+1)	Partey (yellow card) 38'	Report	Allan (yellow card) 55'; Holgate (yellow card) 63'; Delph (yellow card) 68'; Leno 76' (o.g.)	Stadium: Emirates Stadium; Attendance: 0 Referee: Jonathan Moss

1 May 2021 34	Everton	1–2	Aston Villa	Liverpool
20:00 BST (UTC+1)	Calvert-Lewin 19'	Report	Watkins 13'; Douglas Luiz (yellow card) 41'; El Ghazi 80', (yellow card) 90'	Stadium: Goodison Park; Attendance: 0 Referee: Simon Hooper

9 May 2021 35	West Ham United	0–1	Everton	Stratford
16:30 BST (UTC+1)	Souček (yellow card) 72'; Lingard (yellow card) 75'	Report	Calvert-Lewin 24'; Allan (yellow card) 77'	Stadium: London Stadium; Attendance: 0 Referee: Stuart Attwell

13 May 2021 19	Aston Villa	0–0	Everton	Aston, Birmingham
18:00 BST (UTC+1)	Traoré (yellow card) 43'; McGinn (yellow card) 90'	Report	Sigurðsson (yellow card) 55'	Stadium: Villa Park; Attendance: 0 Referee: Martin Atkinson
Note: The match was originally scheduled for 16 January 2021, but was moved forward one day due to Aston Villa first team players isolating after a COVID-19 outbreak at their training ground. The match was then postponed as the training ground could not be opened in time.

16 May 2021 36	Everton	0–1	Sheffield United	Liverpool
19:00 BST (UTC+1)	Rodríguez (yellow card) 66'	Report	Jebbison 7'; Basham (yellow card) 26'; Baldock (yellow card) 81'; Robinson (yellow card) 90'	Stadium: Goodison Park; Attendance: 0 Referee: Jonathan Moss

19 May 2021 37	Everton	1–0	Wolverhampton Wanderers	Liverpool
18:00 BST (UTC+1)	Richarlison 48'	Report	Semedo (yellow card) 80'	Stadium: Goodison Park; Attendance: 6,068; Referee: Andrew Madley

23 May 2021 38	Manchester City	5–0	Everton	Manchester
16:00 BST (UTC+1)	De Bruyne 11'; Gabriel Jesus 14'; Dias (yellow card) 35'; Foden 53'; Sterling (yellow card) 68'; Agüero 71', 76'	Report	Richarlison (yellow card) 7'; Holgate (yellow card) 22'; Sigurðsson (penalty missed) 36'	Stadium: City of Manchester Stadium; Attendance: 10,000; Referee: Michael Oliver

=== FA Cup ===
The third round draw was made on 30 November, with Premier League and EFL Championship clubs all entering the competition. The draw for the fourth and fifth round were made on 11 January, conducted by Peter Crouch.

9 January 2021 Third round	Everton	2–1 (a.e.t.)	Rotherham United	Liverpool
12:00 GMT	Tosun 9'; Doucouré 93'	Report	Olosunde 56'; Hirst (yellow card) 106'	Stadium: Goodison Park; Attendance: 0 Referee: Stuart Attwell

24 January 2021 Fourth round	Everton	3–0	Sheffield Wednesday	Liverpool
20:00 GMT	Calvert-Lewin 29'; Richarlison 59'; Mina 62'; Godfrey (yellow card) 71'	Report		Stadium: Goodison Park; Attendance: 0 Referee: Graham Scott

10 February 2021 Fifth round	Everton	5–4 (a.e.t.)	Tottenham Hotspur	Liverpool
20:15 GMT	Calvert-Lewin 36'; Richarlison 38', 68', (yellow card) 90+2'; Sigurðsson 43' (pen.), (yellow card) 47'; Mina (yellow card) 66'; Digne (yellow card) 90+3'; Bernard 97'	Report	Sánchez 3', 57'; Lamela 45+3'; Kane 83', (yellow card) 90+3'; Alli (yellow card) 88'; Winks (yellow card) 100'	Stadium: Goodison Park; Attendance: 0 Referee: David Coote

20 March 2021 Quarter-finals	Everton	0–2	Manchester City	Liverpool
17:30 GMT	Allan (yellow card) 23'; Gomes (yellow card) 75'	Report	Fernandinho (yellow card) 57'; Gündoğan 84'; De Bruyne 90'	Stadium: Goodison Park; Attendance: 0 Referee: Michael Oliver

=== EFL Cup ===
The draw for both the second and third round were confirmed on September 6, live on Sky Sports by Phil Babb. The fourth round draw was conducted on 17 September 2020 by Laura Woods and Lee Hendrie live on Sky Sports.

16 September 2020 Second round	Everton	3–0	Salford City	Liverpool
20:15 BST	Keane 8'; Sigurðsson 74'; Kean 87' (pen.)	Report	Turnbull (yellow card) 58'; Thomas-Asante (yellow card) 67'	Stadium: Goodison Park; Attendance: 0 Referee: Marc Edwards

23 September 2020 Third round	Fleetwood Town	2–5	Everton	Fleetwood
19:45 BST	Duffy 48'; Camps 58'	Report	Richarlison 22', 34'; Delph (yellow card) 26'; Iwobi 49'; Bernard 73'; Kean 90+4'	Stadium: Highbury Stadium; Attendance: 0 Referee: Jeremy Simpson

30 September 2020 Fourth round	Everton	4–1	West Ham United	Liverpool
19:45 BST	Calvert-Lewin 11', 78', 84'; Richarlison 56'	Report	Snodgrass 46'	Stadium: Goodison Park; Attendance: 0 Referee: Darren England

23 December 2020 Quarter-finals	Everton	0–2	Manchester United	Liverpool
20:00 GMT		Report	Pogba (yellow card) 57'; Cavani 88'; Tuanzebe (yellow card) 90'; Martial (yellow card) 90+1', (goal) 90+6'; Shaw (yellow card) 90+4'	Stadium: Goodison Park; Attendance: 2,000; Referee: Andrew Madley

== Squad ==
=== Current squad ===
As of 1 February 2021

Note: Flags indicate national team as defined under FIFA eligibility rules; some limited exceptions apply. Players may hold more than one non-FIFA nationality.

No.	Pos.	Nation	Player
1	GK	ENG	Jordan Pickford
4	DF	ENG	Mason Holgate
5	DF	ENG	Michael Keane
6	MF	BRA	Allan
7	FW	BRA	Richarlison
8	MF	ENG	Fabian Delph
9	FW	ENG	Dominic Calvert-Lewin
10	MF	ISL	Gylfi Sigurðsson (vice-captain)
11	FW	NOR	Joshua King
12	DF	FRA	Lucas Digne (3rd captain)
13	DF	COL	Yerry Mina
16	MF	MLI	Abdoulaye Doucouré

No.	Pos.	Nation	Player
17	MF	NGR	Alex Iwobi
18	DF	FRA	Niels Nkounkou
19	MF	COL	James Rodríguez
21	MF	POR	André Gomes
22	DF	ENG	Ben Godfrey
23	DF	IRL	Séamus Coleman (captain)
25	MF	CIV	Jean-Philippe Gbamin
26	MF	ENG	Tom Davies
31	GK	POR	João Virgínia
33	GK	SWE	Robin Olsen (on loan from Roma)

=== Out on loan ===
Note: Flags indicate national team as defined under FIFA eligibility rules; some limited exceptions apply. Players may hold more than one non-FIFA nationality.

No.	Pos.	Nation	Player
—	FW	ITA	Moise Kean (at Paris Saint-Germain until 30 June 2021)
—	FW	ENG	Theo Walcott (at Southampton until 30 June 2021)
—	DF	ENG	Jarrad Branthwaite (at Blackburn Rovers until 30 June 2021)
—	DF	ENG	Jonjoe Kenny (at Celtic until 30 June 2021)
—	FW	ENG	Anthony Gordon (at Preston North End until 30 June 2021)
—	FW	TUR	Cenk Tosun (at Beşiktaş until 30 June 2021)

== Statistics ==
=== Appearances and goals ===
No.	Pos	Nat	Player	Total		Premier League		FA Cup		League Cup	
No.	Pos	Nat	Player	Apps	Goals	Apps	Goals	Apps	Goals	Apps	Goals
Goalkeepers
1	GK	(England) ENG	Jordan Pickford	33	0	31	0	0	0	2	0
31	GK	(Portugal) POR	João Virgínia	3	0	0+1	0	1	0	1	0
33	GK	(Sweden) SWE	Robin Olsen	11	0	7	0	3	0	1	0
Defenders
4	DF	(England) ENG	Mason Holgate	31	1	26+2	1	2+1	0	0	0
5	DF	(England) ENG	Michael Keane	41	4	33+2	3	2	0	4	1
12	DF	(France) FRA	Lucas Digne	36	0	30	0	3	0	2+1	0
13	DF	(Colombia) COL	Yerry Mina	29	3	23+1	2	3+1	1	1	0
18	DF	(France) FRA	Niels Nkounkou	6	0	1+1	0	0+1	0	3	0
22	DF	(England) ENG	Ben Godfrey	36	0	29+2	0	4	0	1	0
23	DF	(Republic of Ireland) IRL	Séamus Coleman	31	0	18+7	0	3+1	0	1+1	0
Midfielders
6	MF	(Brazil) BRA	Allan	26	0	23+1	0	1	0	1	0
8	MF	(England) ENG	Fabian Delph	10	0	2+6	0	0	0	2	0
10	MF	(Iceland) ISL	Gylfi Sigurðsson	44	8	24+12	6	3+1	1	4	1
16	MF	(Mali) MLI	Abdoulaye Doucouré	34	3	29	2	2+1	1	1+1	0
21	MF	(Portugal) POR	André Gomes	32	0	17+11	0	3	0	1	0
25	MF	(Ivory Coast) CIV	Jean-Philippe Gbamin	1	0	0+1	0	0	0	0	0
26	MF	(England) ENG	Tom Davies	30	0	17+8	0	2	0	1+2	0
51	MF	(England) ENG	Thierry Small	1	0	0	0	0+1	0	0	0
62	MF	(England) ENG	Tyler Onyango	1	0	0	0	0+1	0	0	0
Forwards
7	FW	(Brazil) BRA	Richarlison	40	13	33+1	7	3	3	3	3
9	FW	(England) ENG	Dominic Calvert-Lewin	39	21	32+1	16	3	2	3	3
11	FW	(Norway) NOR	Joshua King	11	0	0+11	0	0	0	0	0
17	FW	(Nigeria) NGR	Alex Iwobi	36	2	17+13	1	3	0	2+1	1
19	FW	(Colombia) COL	James Rodríguez	26	6	21+2	6	2	0	1	0
20	FW	(Brazil) BRA	Bernard	18	3	3+9	1	0+3	1	2+1	1
34	FW	(Wales) WAL	Nathan Broadhead	1	0	0+1	0	0	0	0	0
Players transferred/loaned out during the season
2	DF	(England) ENG	Jonjoe Kenny	8	0	1+3	0	0+1	0	3	0
11	FW	(England) ENG	Theo Walcott	2	0	0+1	0	0	0	1	0
14	FW	(Turkey) TUR	Cenk Tosun	7	1	0+5	0	1	1	0+1	0
24	FW	(England) ENG	Anthony Gordon	7	0	1+2	0	1+1	0	1+1	0
27	FW	(Italy) ITA	Moise Kean	4	2	0+2	0	0	0	1+1	2
32	DF	(England) ENG	Jarrad Branthwaite	1	0	0	0	0	0	1	0
49	GK	(Denmark) DEN	Jonas Lössl	0	0	0	0	0	0	0	0

Last updated: 23 May 2021
Source: Competitions

=== Goalscorers ===
As of match played 23 May 2021.

Rank	Pos.	No.	Player	Premier League	FA Cup	League Cup	Total
1	FW	9	(England) Dominic Calvert-Lewin	16	2	3	21
2	FW	7	(Brazil) Richarlison	7	3	3	13
3	MF	10	(Iceland) Gylfi Sigurðsson	6	1	1	8
4	MF	19	(Colombia) James Rodríguez	6	0	0	6
5	DF	5	(England) Michael Keane	3	0	1	4
6	DF	13	(Colombia) Yerry Mina	2	1	0	3
6	MF	16	(Mali) Abdoulaye Doucoure	2	1	0	3
6	MF	20	(Brazil) Bernard	1	1	1	3
9	FW	27	(Italy) Moise Kean	0	0	2	2
9	MF	17	(Nigeria) Alex Iwobi	1	0	1	2
11	DF	4	(England) Mason Holgate	1	0	0	1
11	FW	14	(Turkey) Cenk Tosun	0	1	0	1
Total				45	10	12	67

Source: Match reports in Competitions

=== Assists ===
As of match played 23 May 2021.

Rank	Pos.	No.	Player	Premier League	FA Cup	League Cup	Total
1	MF	10	(Iceland) Gylfi Sigurðsson	5	3	2	10
2	MF	19	(Colombia) James Rodríguez	4	3	1	8
3	DF	12	(France) Lucas Digne	7	0	0	7
4	FW	7	(Brazil) Richarlison	3	0	0	3
4	MF	17	(Nigeria) Alex Iwobi	2	0	1	3
4	FW	24	(England) Anthony Gordon	0	1	2	3
4	MF	16	(Mali) Abdoulaye Doucouré	3	0	0	3
4	DF	23	(Republic of Ireland) Séamus Coleman	3	0	0	3
9	MF	21	(Portugal) Andre Gomes	1	1	0	2
9	DF	5	(England) Michael Keane	1	0	1	2
9	FW	9	(England) Dominic Calvert-Lewin	1	1	0	2
9	DF	22	(England) Ben Godfrey	2	0	0	2
13	MF	26	(England) Tom Davies	1	0	0	1
13	MF	20	(Brazil) Bernard	0	0	1	1
13	DF	18	(France) Niels Nkounkou	0	0	1	1
Total				33	9	9	51

Source: Match reports in Competitions

=== Clean sheets ===
As of match played 23 May 2021.

Rank	Pos.	No.	Player	Premier League	FA Cup	League Cup	Total
1	GK	1	(England) Jordan Pickford	10	0	0	10
2	GK	33	(Sweden) Robin Olsen	2	1	0	3
3	GK	31	(Portugal) João Virgínia	0	0	1	1
Total				12	1	1	14

Source: Match reports in Competitions

=== Disciplinary record ===
As of match played 23 May 2021.

Rank	Position	Name	Premier League		FA Cup		League Cup		Total	
Rank	Position	Name	Yellow card	Red card	Yellow card	Red card	Yellow card	Red card	Yellow card	Red card
1	DF	(England) Mason Holgate	9	0	0	0	0	0	9	0
2	MF	(Brazil) Allan	6	0	1	0	0	0	7	0
3	MF	(Mali) Abdoulaye Doucouré	6	0	0	0	0	0	6	0
3	FW	(Brazil) Richarlison	4	1	1	0	0	0	5	1
5	DF	(England) Ben Godfrey	3	0	1	0	0	0	4	0
5	MF	(Portugal) André Gomes	3	0	1	0	0	0	4	0
5	DF	(France) Lucas Digne	2	1	1	0	0	0	3	1
8	FW	(England) Dominic Calvert-Lewin	3	0	0	0	0	0	3	0
8	DF	(Colombia) Yerry Mina	2	0	1	0	0	0	3	0
8	DF	(England) Michael Keane	3	0	0	0	0	0	3	0
8	MF	(Colombia) James Rodríguez	3	0	0	0	0	0	3	0
12	FW	(Brazil) Bernard	2	0	0	0	0	0	2	0
12	MF	(England) Tom Davies	2	0	0	0	0	0	2	0
12	MF	(England) Fabian Delph	1	0	0	0	1	0	2	0
12	MF	(Iceland) Gylfi Sigurðsson	1	0	1	0	0	0	2	0
16	DF	(France) Niels Nkounkou	1	0	0	0	0	0	1	0
16	FW	(Turkey) Cenk Tosun	1	0	0	0	0	0	1	0
16	GK	(England) Jordan Pickford	1	0	0	0	0	0	1	0
16	GK	(Sweden) Robin Olsen	1	0	0	0	0	0	1	0
Total			53	2	7	0	1	0	61	2

Source: Match reports in Competitions
