= Tom Davies (footballer, born 1998) =

English association football player

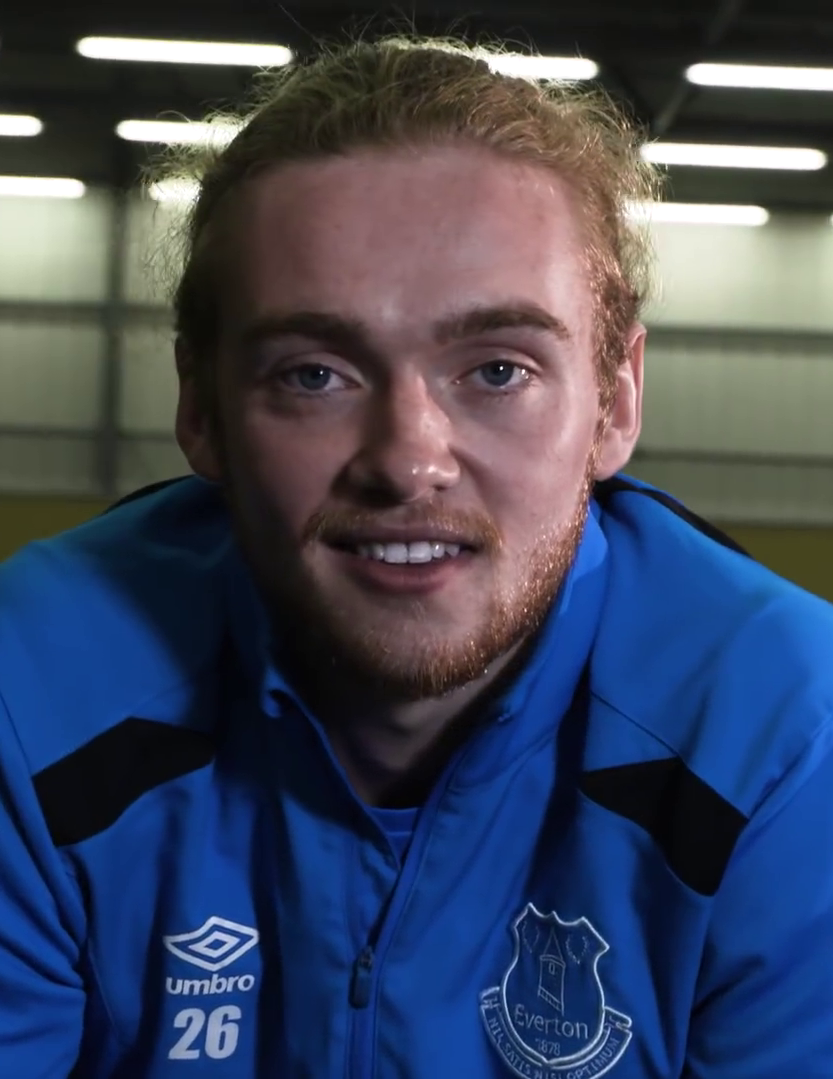
- Davies with Everton in 2018

Personal information
- Full name: Thomas Davies
- Date of birth: 30 June 1998 (age 28)
- Place of birth: Liverpool, England
- Height: 5 ft 11 in (1.80 m)
- Position: Midfielder

Youth career
- 2009–2015: Everton

Senior career*
| Years | Team | Apps | (Gls) |
| 2015–2023 | Everton | 155 | (7) |
| 2023–2026 | Sheffield United | 32 | (1) |

International career
| 2013–2014 | England U16 | 9 | (1) |
| 2014–2015 | England U17 | 18 | (0) |
| 2016 | England U18 | 4 | (0) |
| 2016–2017 | England U19 | 8 | (1) |
| 2017–2021 | England U21 | 23 | (2) |
- * Club domestic league appearances and goals as of 13:51, 4 April 2026 (UTC)

Thomas Davies (born 30 June 1998) is an English professional footballer who plays as a midfielder.

Davies is an academy graduate of Everton, and made his first-team debut for the club in April 2016 aged 17. Two years later, he became the youngest player to captain the side, doing so at the age of 20 years. In 2023, he left Everton and joined Sheffield United.

== Early and personal life ==
Davies was born in Liverpool, Merseyside. He is the nephew of former Everton player Alan Whittle, who made 74 appearances for the club between 1967 and 1972, and his older brother, Liam, is a semi-professional footballer who plays for Bala Town. Davies is a volunteer with the Sunday Supper Project, a local charity organisation aimed at supporting Liverpool's homeless community.

== Club career ==
=== Everton ===
==== Youth career ====
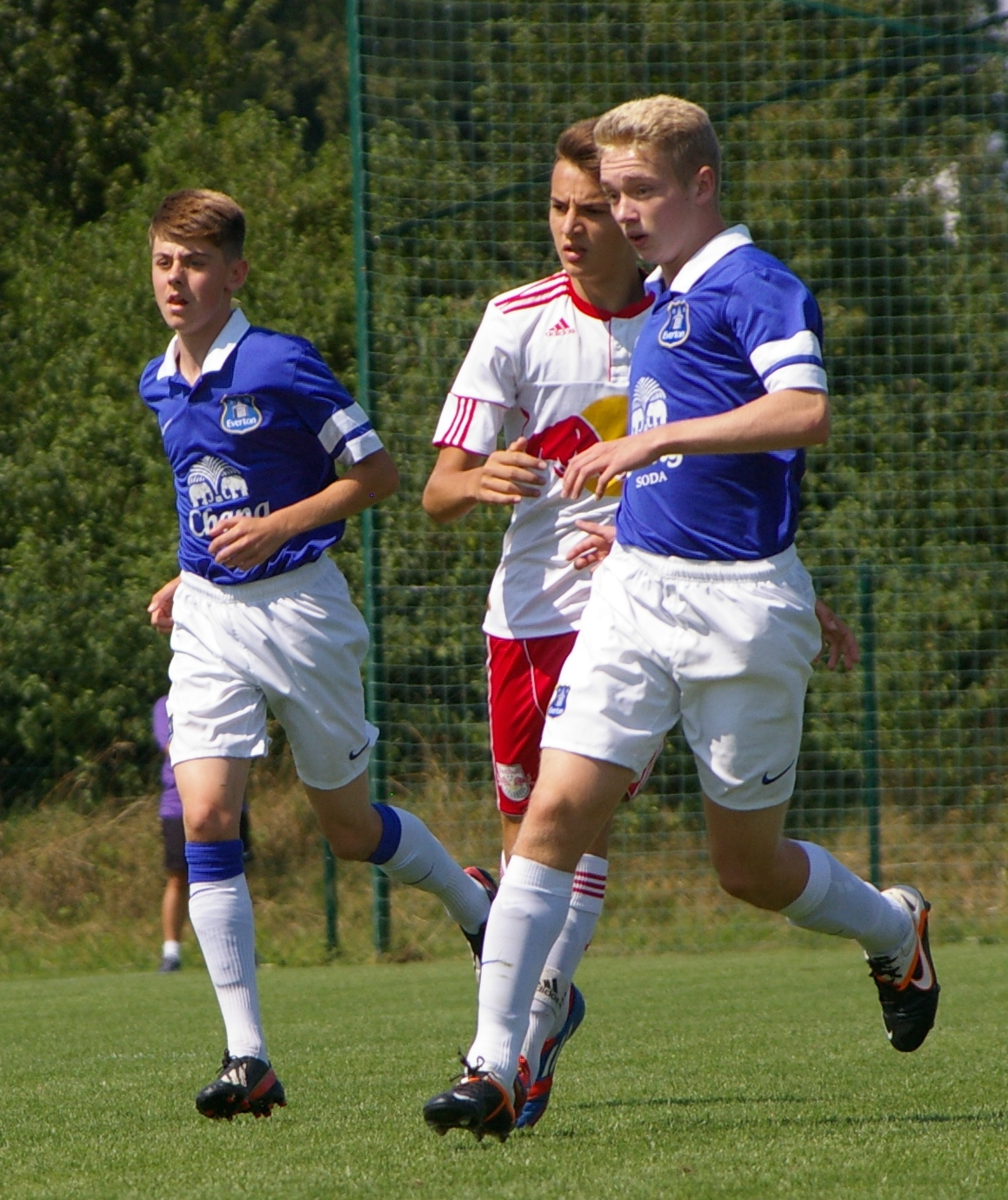
Davies (right) playing for Everton's youth team in 2013

Davies is an academy graduate of Everton, having joined the club at the age of eleven. He became a first-year scholar ahead of the 2014–15 season and was promoted to the under-21s at the end of that campaign. Davies continued to play regularly for the under-21s the following season.

==== Senior career ====
He signed his first professional contract with Everton in September 2015. Davies' form for Everton's under-21 side was rewarded when he was handed his Premier League debut by Roberto Martínez on 16 April 2016, coming on as an 83rd-minute substitute for Darron Gibson in a 1–1 draw with Southampton at Goodison Park. On the final day of the Premier League season, following the dismissal of Martínez, Davies was handed his first start for Everton by interim manager David Unsworth in a 3–0 win over Norwich City. His performance over the course of the 90 minutes earned him the Man of the Match award.

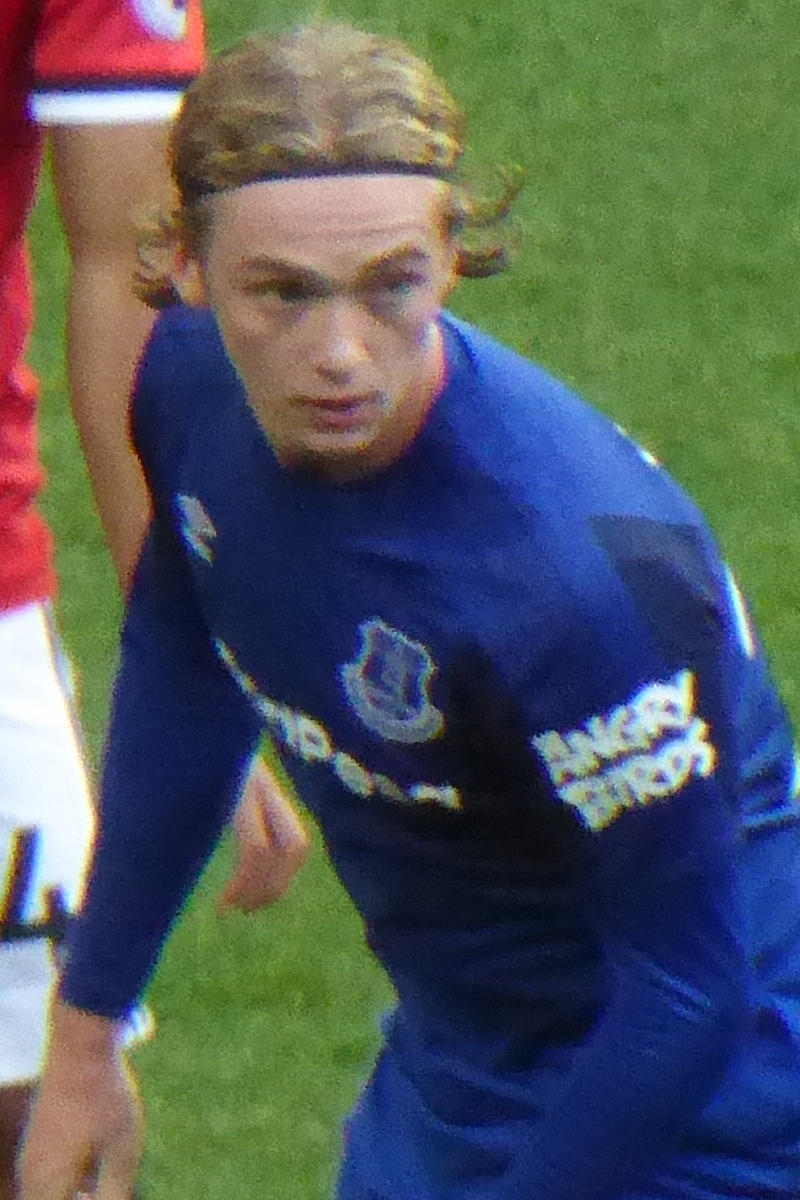
Davies playing for Everton in 2017

On 3 August 2016, Davies signed a new five-year contract with Everton. He was given the squad number 26 by new manager Ronald Koeman, having previously worn 41.

Having previously made five appearances from the substitutes' bench, Davies made his first start of the 2016–17 league campaign on 2 January 2017 and registered his first assist for Everton in a 3–0 win over Southampton. He scored his first goal for the club 13 days later in a 4–0 league victory over Manchester City. His performance also saw him named man of the match. On 9 April, he scored the joint-fastest goal of the season when he netted after just 30 seconds in a 4–2 win over reigning champions Leicester City. The following month, at the club's end of season awards dinner, Davies was named Everton's Young Player of the Year and also won the Goal of the Season and Performance of the Season honours for his role in the victory over Manchester City.

The following season, Everton lost six of their opening twelve matches during which Davies was predominantly used as an option from the bench and struggled to find form. He returned to form following the appointment of Sam Allardyce and in February 2018 was named by the CIES Football Observatory as the world's seventh-most promising footballer under the age of 20. Later that month he made his 50th Premier League appearance for the club in a 1–0 defeat to Watford.

On 29 August 2018, under newly-appointed manager Marco Silva, Davies captained Everton for the first time in a 3–1 EFL Cup victory over Rotherham United. In doing so, and at the age of 20 years and 60 days, he became the youngest player to ever captain the club, breaking the record previously set by Steve McMahon in 1983. On 23 September, he captained the side once again in the Premier League match at Arsenal, a role which he continued in the following two league matches against Fulham and Leicester City. However, after this he returned to the bench, making only three appearances in the league until 29 January 2019, where he started in a 1–0 win at Huddersfield Town, setting up Richarlison for the only goal of the match. On 30 April, he signed a contract extension which would keep him at Everton until 2023.

Despite being one of 20 players nominated for the Golden Boy award, Davies ultimately struggled to define his role in Silva's squad, making just 16 league appearances for the season.

After playing only 20 minutes during the first eight fixtures of the 2019–20 Premier League season, Davies started in Everton's 2–0 win over West Ham United on 19 October 2019. He continued to start regularly for the Toffees for the remainder of the season, starting 23 league matches overall.

During the 2020–21 season, Davies made 30 appearances for Everton as the team finished eighth in the Premier League under Carlo Ancelotti.

In June 2023, it was announced that Davies would leave Everton after his contract with the club expired and he rejected a new deal.

=== Sheffield United ===
On 16 August 2023, Davies joined newly-promoted Premier League club Sheffield United on a three-year deal.

On 29 November 2024, Davies scored his first goal in over three years, in a 1–0 win over Sunderland.

On 13 April 2026, the club announced that Davies would leave Sheffield United at the end of the 2025–26 season.

== International career ==
Davies has represented England up to under-21 level. On 7 October 2015, he was invited by England manager Roy Hodgson to train with the senior squad following his progression with the under-17 side. Just seven days later, he was named captain of the England under-17 team for the 2015 FIFA U-17 World Cup in Chile. The FA agreed Everton's request to rest Davies so that he would not feature at the European Under-19 Championship for the England U-19 in summer 2017.

He represented England at the Toulon Tournament the following year and featured throughout as the nation went on to claim its third consecutive title in the competition.

== Career statistics ==
=== Club ===
As of match played 4 April 2026

Appearances and goals by club, season and competition
| Club | Season | League | | | FA Cup | | EFL Cup | | Europe | | Other | | Total | |
| Club | Season | Division | Apps | Goals | Apps | Goals | Apps | Goals | Apps | Goals | Apps | Goals | Apps | Goals |
|---|---|---|---|---|---|---|---|---|---|---|---|---|---|---|
| Everton | 2015–16 | Premier League | 2 | 0 | 0 | 0 | 0 | 0 | — | | — | | 2 | 0 |
| Everton | 2016–17 | Premier League | 24 | 2 | 1 | 0 | 0 | 0 | — | | — | | 25 | 2 |
| Everton | 2017–18 | Premier League | 33 | 2 | 1 | 0 | 2 | 0 | 7 (Note: Appearances in UEFA Europa League) | 0 | — | | 43 | 2 |
| Everton | 2018–19 | Premier League | 16 | 0 | 1 | 0 | 2 | 0 | — | | — | | 19 | 0 |
| Everton | 2019–20 | Premier League | 30 | 1 | 0 | 0 | 2 | 1 | — | | — | | 32 | 2 |
| Everton | 2020–21 | Premier League | 25 | 0 | 2 | 0 | 3 | 0 | — | | — | | 30 | 0 |
| Everton | 2021–22 | Premier League | 6 | 1 | 0 | 0 | 2 | 0 | — | | — | | 8 | 1 |
| Everton | 2022–23 | Premier League | 19 | 0 | 0 | 0 | 1 | 0 | — | | — | | 20 | 0 |
| Everton | Total | | 155 | 6 | 5 | 0 | 12 | 1 | 7 | 0 | 0 | 0 | 179 | 7 |
| Sheffield United | 2023–24 | Premier League | 9 | 0 | 0 | 0 | 0 | 0 | — | | — | | 9 | 0 |
| Sheffield United | 2024–25 | Championship | 13 | 1 | 0 | 0 | 0 | 0 | — | | 3 (Note: Appearances in EFL Championship play-offs) | 0 | 16 | 1 |
| Sheffield United | 2025–26 | Championship | 10 | 0 | 1 | 0 | 0 | 0 | — | | — | | 11 | 0 |
| Sheffield United | Total | | 32 | 1 | 1 | 0 | 0 | 0 | 0 | 0 | 3 | 0 | 36 | 1 |
| Career total | | | 187 | 7 | 6 | 0 | 12 | 1 | 7 | 0 | 3 | 0 | 215 | 8 |

== Honours ==
England U21

- Toulon Tournament: 2018

Individual

- Everton Young Player of the Season: 2016–17
- Everton Goal of the Season: 2016–17
- Everton Performance of the Season: 2016–17
