= Kieran Dowell =

English footballer (born 1997)

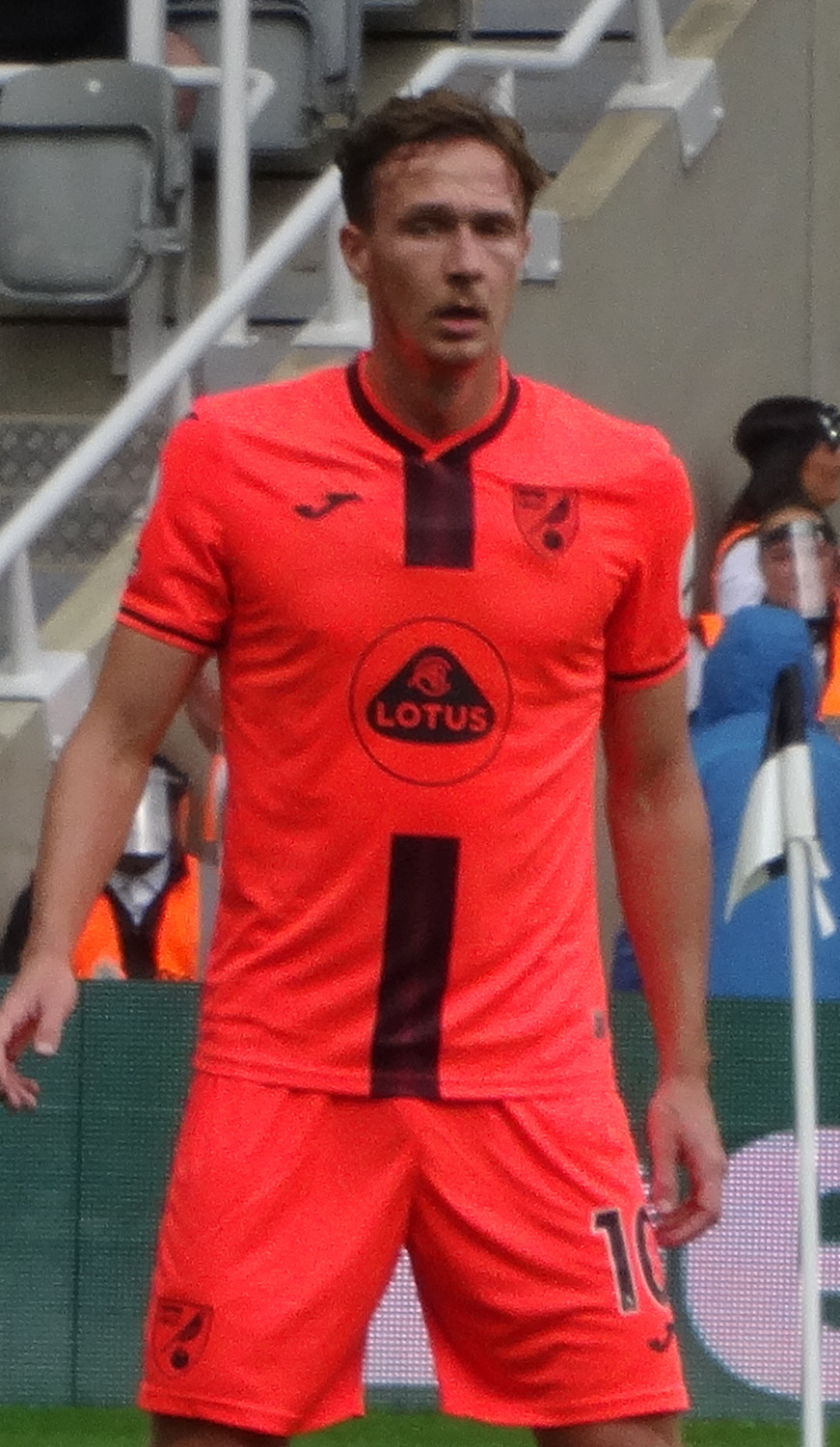
- Dowell playing for Norwich City in 2021

Personal information
- Full name: Kieran O'Neill Dowell
- Date of birth: 10 October 1997 (age 29)
- Place of birth: Ormskirk, England
- Height: 6 ft 1 in (1.86 m)
- Position: Midfielder

Team information
- Current team: Hull City
- Number: 26

Youth career
- 2005–2014: Everton

Senior career*
Years	Team	Apps	(Gls)
2014–2020	Everton	2	(0)
2017–2018	→ Nottingham Forest (loan)	38	(9)
2019	→ Sheffield United (loan)	16	(2)
2019–2020	→ Derby County (loan)	10	(0)
2020	→ Wigan Athletic (loan)	12	(5)
2020–2023	Norwich City	67	(11)
2023–2026	Rangers	26	(2)
2025	→ Birmingham City (loan)	19	(5)
2026–	Hull City	13	(1)

International career
2012	England U16	1	(0)
2013–2014	England U17	7	(0)
2014–2015	England U18	3	(0)
2016–2017	England U20	16	(1)
2017–2019	England U21	17	(2)
- * Club domestic league appearances and goals as of 20:14, 2 May 2026 (UTC)

Kieran O'Neill Dowell (born 10 October 1997) is an English professional footballer who plays as a midfielder for Premier League club Hull City.

Dowell previously played for Everton having graduated from their youth academy in 2014, from where he had loan spells with Nottingham Forest, Sheffield United, Derby County and Wigan Athletic. He would later depart Everton and join fellow English side Norwich City in July 2020. He would then join Scottish club Rangers in 2023.

Internationally, Dowell represented England at under-16, under-17, under-18, under-20, and under-21 level.

== Club career ==
=== Everton ===
Born in Ormskirk, Lancashire, Dowell joined Everton's academy at the age of 7. After progressing through the ranks and the reserve side, he signed a scholarship with the club in June 2014. He then scored in a friendly for the Everton U21 side, in a 1–0 win over Rhyl on 26 July 2014.

Dowell made his debut for the club on 11 December 2014, replacing the injured Christian Atsu 11 minutes into a UEFA Europa League group match against FC Krasnodar at Goodison Park. Everton, who had already advanced into the next round, lost 0–1. With his only first team appearances of the season, he signed his first professional contract with the club.

After being given a number 51 shirt in the 2015–16 season, Dowell, however, suffered ankle injury that saw him sidelined for two months. He scored on his return for the Everton U21 on 6 December 2015, in a 3–1 win over Liverpool U23. Dowell went on to score nine more goals for the reserve side, including a stunner against Southampton U21 and a hat-trick against Leicester City U23. On 30 April 2016, he made his Premier League debut as an 87th-minute substitute for Ross Barkley in a 2–1 home win over Bournemouth. Dowell then started the final game of the 2015–16 season against Norwich City at Goodison Park.

Two months after making his Premier League debut, Dowell signed a three-year contract with the club, keeping him until 2019. In the 2016–17 season, Dowell was a member of the Everton U23 squad to win the inaugural Premier League 2 title, in which he made the total of 22 appearances and scoring 5 times. His performance throughout April won him April's Premier League 2 Player of the Month.

==== Loan spells ====
On 3 August 2017, Dowell signed on a season-long loan with Championship side Nottingham Forest. He made his Forest debut, coming on as a second-half substitute, in a 1–0 win over Millwall in the opening game of the season. He scored his first goal for Forest in a 4–3 win at Brentford on 12 August 2017. Since making his Nottingham Forest debut, he became a first team regular. Dowell scored again on 30 September 2017, in a 2–1 win over Sheffield United. Four weeks later, on 28 October 2017, he scored his first ever hat-trick, in a 3–2 win over Hull City. After the match, Dowell's performance was praised by local newspaper Nottingham Post and the club's supporters. However, Mark Warburton was sacked as Forest manager on 31 December 2017 and was replaced by Aitor Karanka. Dowell fell out of favour under the new manager and struggled to hold a place in the starting eleven. He played just 59 minutes during the last eight games of the season.

On 28 December 2018, it was announced that Dowell would join Sheffield United as of 2 January 2019 on loan for the rest of the season. On 28 April 2019 United were promoted to the Premier League. The following season, on 11 July 2019, Dowell joined Derby County on a season-long loan. On 3 January 2020, Everton cancelled Dowell's loan to Derby and sent him on loan to Wigan for the remainder of the season. On 14 July 2020, Dowell scored a hat-trick as Wigan defeated Hull City by a scoreline of 8–0; the result was Wigan's biggest victory in club history.

=== Norwich City ===
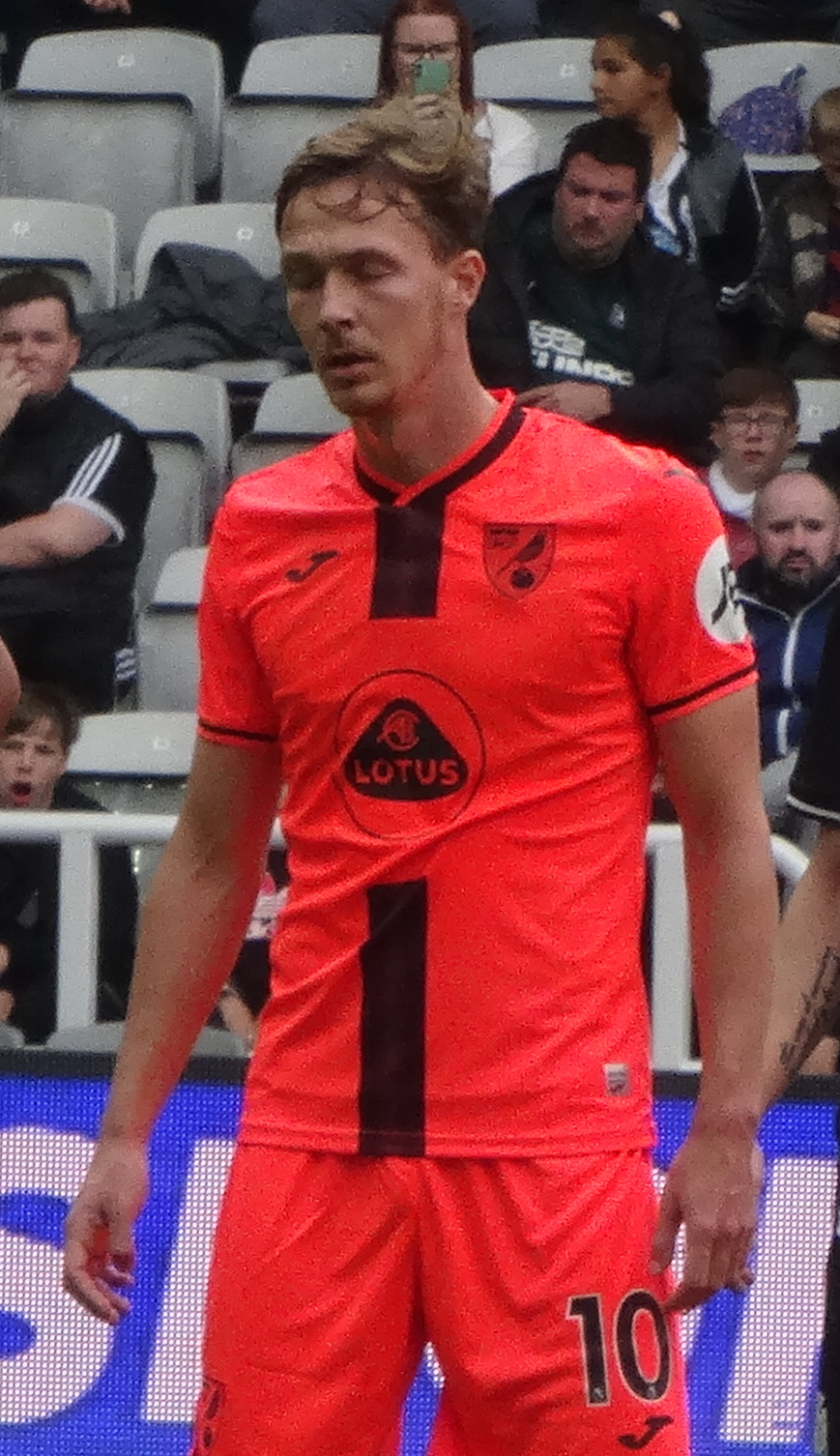
Dowell playing for Norwich City in 2021

On 30 July 2020, Dowell joined Championship club Norwich City on a three-year deal, for a reported fee of £1.5m. He scored on his debut for Norwich in a 3–1 EFL Cup defeat to Luton Town on 5 September 2020. On 1 May 2021, Dowell scored twice as Norwich City defeated Reading 4–1 to secure the Championship title and make an instant return to the Premier League. Dowell scored his first Premier League goal for Norwich City on 16 April 2022 in a 3-2 loss to Manchester United where he also registered an assist to teammate Teemu Pukki. On 21 February 2023, he made his final appearance for Norwich City, starting in a win over Birmingham City, thereafter sustaining a knee injury that ended his season.

=== Rangers ===
On 24 May 2023, it was announced that Dowell had signed a pre-contract agreement to join Scottish Premiership side Rangers. He made his debut for the club, starting the match, in a 1-0 defeat away to Kilmarnock on 5 August. He scored his first goal for Rangers during a league match at home to Livingston on 12 August. On 7 November, Dowell made an appearance for the Rangers B team in a Scottish Challenge Cup fourth round match at home to Airdrieonians. He started the match and scored the second goal for Rangers in a 4–2 defeat.

==== Birmingham City (loan) ====
On 27 January 2025, Dowell returned to England and signed for EFL League One club Birmingham City on loan for the rest of the season.

=== Hull City ===
On 23 January 2026, Dowell left Rangers, signing permanently for Hull City on a one-and-a-half-year deal. He made his debut the following day when he came off the bench as an 88th-minute substitute for Kyle Joseph in the 2–1 home win against Swansea City. He scored his first goal for Hull City on 7 February, in the 2–3 home loss to Bristol City.

== International career ==
After representing England at lower youth levels, Dowell was selected for the England under-20 team for the first time, making his debut in a 1–1 draw against Brazil alongside then-Everton teammate Dominic Calvert-Lewin. In May 2017, Dowell was selected for the England U20 in the 2017 FIFA U-20 World Cup. After setting up two goals in a 3–0 win over Argentina on Matchday 1 of the group stage, he scored the only goal against hosts South Korea, ensuring a place in the second round for England. He also started in the final, in which England beat Venezuela 1–0 for England's first triumph in a global tournament since their World Cup victory in 1966.

Following the end of the 2017 FIFA U-20 World Cup, Dowell was called up to the England U21 squad, for whom he made his debut in a 1–1 draw with Netherlands U21 on 1 September 2017.

On 27 May 2019, Dowell was included in England's 23-man squad for the 2019 UEFA European Under-21 Championship.

== Personal life ==
Born in Ormskirk, England, Dowell grew up supporting Everton, the team he would eventually play for, and idolised former Everton midfielder Mikel Arteta. While at the academy, he was a ball-boy when he was 14. At 20, he moved out of his parents' house for an apartment.

== Career statistics ==
As of 25 August 2026

Appearances and goals by club, season and competition
Club	Season	League			National cup (Note: Includes FA Cup, Scottish Cup)		League cup (Note: Includes EFL Cup, Scottish League Cup)		Europe		Other		Total	
Club	Season	Division	Apps	Goals	Apps	Goals	Apps	Goals	Apps	Goals	Apps	Goals	Apps	Goals
Everton	2014–15	Premier League	0	0	0	0	0	0	1 (Note: Appearance in UEFA Europa League)	0	—		1	0
Everton	2015–16	Premier League	2	0	0	0	0	0	—		—		2	0
Everton	2016–17	Premier League	0	0	0	0	0	0	—		—		0	0
Everton	2018–19	Premier League	0	0	—		2	0	—		—		2	0
Everton	Total		2	0	0	0	2	0	1	0	—		5	0
Nottingham Forest (loan)	2017–18	Championship	38	9	2	1	3	0	—		—		43	10
Sheffield United (loan)	2018–19	Championship	16	2	1	0	0	0	—		—		17	2
Derby County (loan)	2019–20	Championship	10	0	—		0	0	—		—		10	0
Wigan Athletic (loan)	2019–20	Championship	12	5	1	0	—		—		—		13	5
Norwich City	2020–21	Championship	24	5	1	0	1	1	—		—		26	6
Norwich City	2021–22	Premier League	19	1	3	0	2	0	—		—		24	1
Norwich City	2022–23	Championship	24	5	1	0	1	0	—		—		26	5
Norwich City	Total		67	11	5	0	4	1	0	0	—		76	12
Rangers	2023–24	Scottish Premiership	12	2	0	0	1	0	3 (Note: Appearances in UEFA Champions League)	0	—		16	2
Rangers	2024–25	Scottish Premiership	12	0	0	0	2	0	2 (Note: One appearance in UEFA Champions League, one appearance in UEFA Europa League)	0	—		16	0
Rangers	2025–26	Scottish Premiership	2	0	1	1	1	0	3	0	—		7	1
Rangers	Total		26	2	1	1	4	0	8	0	—		39	3
Rangers B	2023–24	—			—		—		—		1 (Note: Appearance in Scottish Challenge Cup)	1	1	1
Birmingham City (loan)	2024–25	League One	19	5	1	0	—		—		3 (Note: Appearances in EFL Trophy)	0	23	5
Hull City	2025–26	Championship	13	1	1	0	—		—		1 (Note: Appearance in EFL Championship play-offs)	0	15	1
Hull City	2026–27	Premier League	0	0	0	0	1	1	—		—		1	1
Hull City	Total		13	1	1	0	1	1	—		1	0	16	2
Career total			203	35	12	2	15	2	13	1	5	1	244	40

== Honours ==
Sheffield United

- EFL Championship second-place promotion: 2018–19

Norwich City

- EFL Championship: 2020–21

Rangers

- Scottish League Cup: 2023–24

Birmingham City

- EFL League One: 2024–25
- EFL Trophy runner-up: 2024–25

Hull City

- EFL Championship play-offs: 2026

England U20

- FIFA U-20 World Cup: 2017

England U21

- Toulon Tournament: 2018
