= Mason Holgate =

English-Jamaican footballer (born 1996)

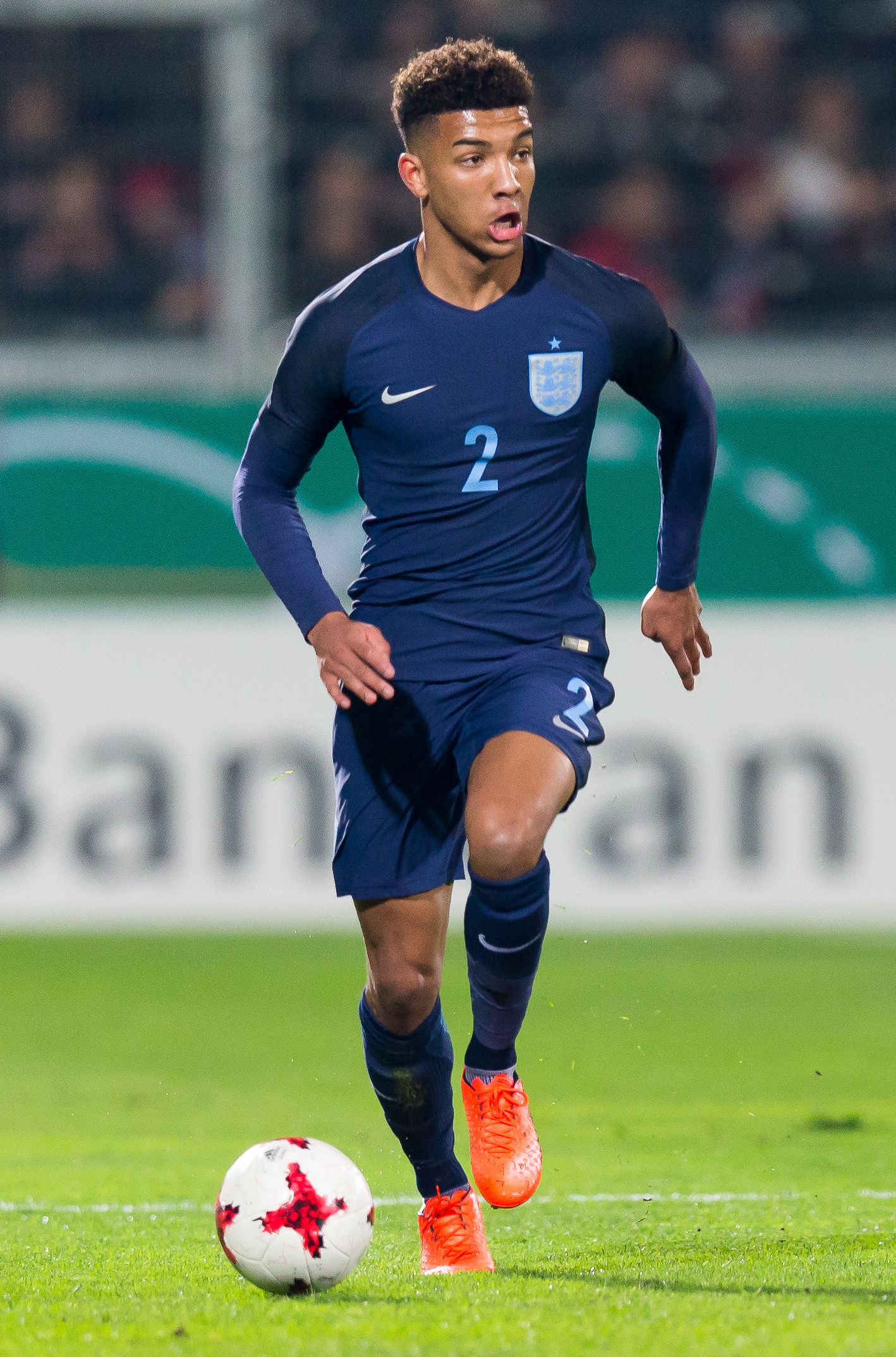
- Holgate playing for England U21 in 2017

Personal information
- Full name: Mason Anthony Holgate
- Date of birth: 22 October 1996 (age 30)
- Place of birth: Doncaster, England
- Height: 6 ft 0 in (1.84 m)
- Positions: Centre-back; right-back

Team information
- Current team: Al-Gharafa
- Number: 27

Youth career
- 2005–2014: Barnsley

Senior career*
Years	Team	Apps	(Gls)
2014–2015	Barnsley	20	(1)
2015–2025	Everton	127	(3)
2019	→ West Bromwich Albion (loan)	19	(1)
2023–2024	→ Southampton (loan)	5	(0)
2024	→ Sheffield United (loan)	10	(0)
2024–2025	→ West Bromwich Albion (loan)	26	(1)
2025–	Al-Gharafa	2	(0)
2026	→ Al-Sailiya (loan)	5	(0)

International career^{‡}
2015–2016	England U20	8	(0)
2016–2018	England U21	6	(0)
2024–	Jamaica	10	(0)
- * Club domestic league appearances and goals as of 14:44, 1 October 2026 (UTC) ‡ National team caps and goals as of 22:37, 19 November 2025 (UTC)

Mason Anthony Holgate (born 22 October 1996) is a professional footballer who plays as a centre-back or right-back for Qatar Stars League club Al-Gharafa. Born in England, he represents the Jamaica national team.

A product of Barnsley's youth academy, Holgate signed his first professional deal with the club in August 2014, making his debut for the club that December. In August 2015, he signed for Premier League club Everton for a fee reported to be £2 million. He debuted in August of the following year, and would then establish himself as a regular defender at the club, making 146 total appearances for Everton. During his time with the club, he went out on loan to West Bromwich Albion (twice), Southampton, and Sheffield United, before departing the club in the summer of 2025. He then moved to Al-Gharafa.

== Club career ==
=== Barnsley ===
Holgate was born in Doncaster, South Yorkshire.

At the age of nine, having progressed through the club's academy and reserve team, Holgate signed his first professional contract, keeping him at Barnsley until 2016. He made his League One debut for Barnsley on 2 December 2014, playing the full ninety minutes of a 1–1 draw with Doncaster Rovers at Oakwell. Following this, the club were determined to negotiate a longer-term contract for Holgate. After inclusion in the first team, Holgate scored his first Barnsley goal, in a 5–0 win over Rochdale in the last game of the season.

Following a successful debut season at Barnsley, Holgate was named 2014–15 Young Player of the Year. In addition to this award, press speculation linked Holgate with a number of Premier League clubs; in July 2015, he went on trial at Manchester United.

=== Everton ===
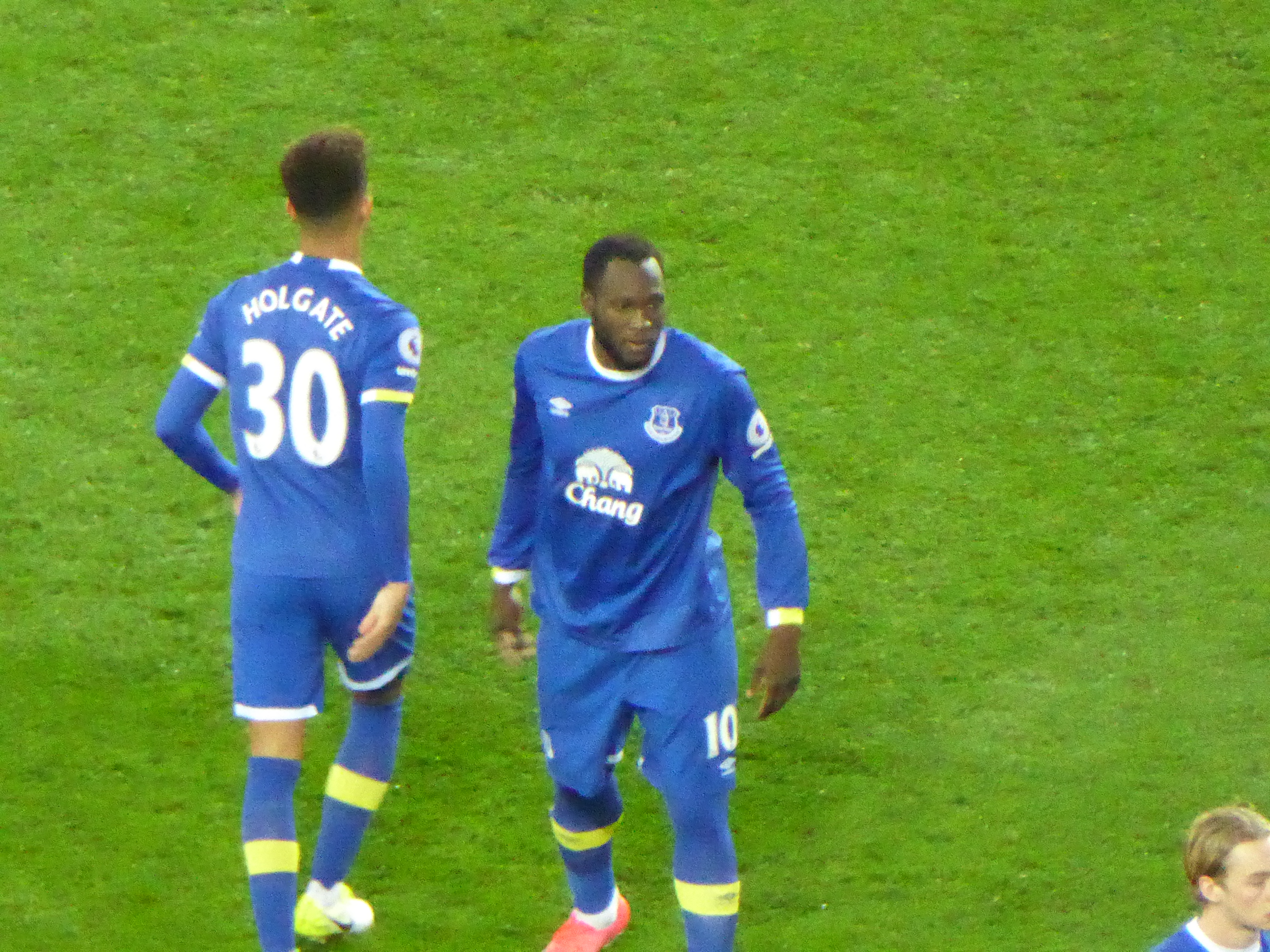
Holgate (left) playing for Everton in 2017

On 13 August 2015, Holgate signed a five-year deal to join Premier League side Everton for a reported fee of £2 million. On 13 August 2016, a year after he signed for the club, Holgate made his Premier League debut in the 1–1 draw with Tottenham Hotspur. After defender Séamus Coleman suffered a broken leg in a World Cup qualifier match in March 2017 which caused him to be sidelined for nearly a year, Holgate was selected by Ronald Koeman as a replacement at the right-back position for the latter half of the 2016–17 season.

Following the arrival of manager Carlo Ancelotti, Holgate established himself as a regular centre-back at Everton, although he was deployed as a defensive midfielder on some occasions. On 29 October 2019, Holgate scored his first goal for the club in a 2–0 victory against Watford in the EFL Cup after he nodded in a cross delivered by Theo Walcott. During the 2019–20 season, he made 32 total appearances for the Toffees in all competition, including 27 in the league. On 3 March 2020, he signed a new five-year contract extension with Everton, keeping him at the club until the summer of 2025.

In September 2020, Holgate was injured in a pre-season game with Preston North End, which kept him out of action for two months. He was named as captain for a home game against Leeds United on 28 November, a game which Everton went on to lose 1–0. On 16 December, he scored his first Premier League goal in a 2–0 away win against Leicester City.

Holgate (far right, number 4) playing for Everton in 2021

On 7 November 2021, Holgate received a red card for a dangerous tackle on Tottenham Hotspur's Pierre-Emile Højbjerg in a 0–0 home draw at Goodison Park. On 8 February 2022, he scored an own goal in a 3–1 loss to Newcastle United.

On 22 April 2023, Holgate was sent off following a challenge on Jordan Ayew in a goalless draw against Crystal Palace.

On 9 June 2025, it was announced that Holgate would be one of the players leaving Everton when his contract expired in the summer, ending his ten-year-long spell with the club.

==== West Bromwich Albion (loan) ====
On 31 December 2018, Holgate joined Championship side West Bromwich Albion on loan until the end of the season.

==== Southampton (loan) ====
On 25 August 2023, Holgate joined Championship side Southampton on a season-long loan. He made his debut for the club on 2 September in a 5–0 defeat to Sunderland. On 1 February 2024, his loan deal was terminated early.

==== Sheffield United (loan) ====
On 1 February 2024, Holgate joined Premier League side Sheffield United for the remainder of the 2023–24 season. He made his debut two days later at home against Aston Villa, in a 5–0 defeat at Bramall Lane. On 18 February, Holgate became the only Premier League player to be sent off in each of the last three seasons, when he tackled Brighton's Kaoru Mitoma with excessive force after 12 minutes, following a VAR check, after referee Stuart Attwell had initially shown him a yellow card. Observers on social media and media expressed outrage over the tackle, including former Premier League and England goalkeeper, Ben Foster. In his absence, Sheffield United went on to suffer another 5–0 defeat.

==== West Bromwich Albion (loan) ====
On 30 August 2024, Holgate returned to West Bromwich Albion for a second loan spell for the 2024–25 season.

=== Al-Gharafa ===
In July 2025, Holgate moved to Qatar, signing for Qatar Stars League side Al-Gharafa on a free transfer, signing a two-year deal with an option for an extra year.

=== Al-Sailiya (loan) ===
On 10 January 2026, Holgate signed for fellow Qatari side Al-Sailiya on a six-month loan until the end of the season.

== International career ==
Holgate is of Jamaican descent through his grandparents, and was eligible to represent both England and Jamaica internationally. Holgate was the starting right-back for England under-21 during the 2017 UEFA European Under-21 Championship in June 2017.

Holgate said in an interview with The Voice in March 2020 that he was interested in representing the Jamaica, though he had not put much thought into his international future, focusing primarily on his career with Everton. However, he also said in an interview to Sky Sports the same month that he wanted to be called up to England, stating: "Everybody wants to play for England. When you're a kid, that's the ultimate, but it's down to me to decide that through playing well for Everton".

Despite being born in England and having previous England caps for its youth ranks, in March 2021 it was reported that Holgate would be called up to the Jamaica national team, as part of a policy of the Jamaican Football Federation to call up several English players to improve the nation's chances of qualifying for the 2022 World Cup. JFF president Michael Ricketts said that Holgate was applying for a Jamaican passport to play for the side. However, he was not one of the six England-born players called up to Jamaica for the first time for the match against the United States on 25 March 2021.

Holgate was eventually called up for the Jamaica squad for their CONCACAF Nations League matches versus Nicaragua and Honduras on 10 and 14 October 2024 respectively. His debut came against the former when he was a substitute for Joel Latibeaudiere in a 2–0 victory over Nicaragua.

== Career statistics ==
=== Club ===
As of match played 3 March 2026

Appearances and goals by club, season and competition
Club	Season	League			National cup (Note: Includes FA Cup, Amir of Qatar Cup)		League cup (Note: Includes EFL Cup, QSL Cup)		Other		Total	
Club	Season	Division	Apps	Goals	Apps	Goals	Apps	Goals	Apps	Goals	Apps	Goals
Barnsley	2014–15	League One	20	1	2	0	0	0	0	0	22	1
Everton	2015–16	Premier League	0	0	0	0	0	0	—		0	0
Everton	2016–17	Premier League	18	0	1	0	2	0	—		21	0
Everton	2017–18	Premier League	15	0	1	0	1	0	4 (Note: Appearances in UEFA Europa League)	0	21	0
Everton	2018–19	Premier League	5	0	0	0	1	0	—		6	0
Everton	2019–20	Premier League	27	0	1	0	4	1	—		32	1
Everton	2020–21	Premier League	28	1	3	0	0	0	—		31	1
Everton	2021–22	Premier League	25	2	2	1	2	0	—		29	3
Everton	2022–23	Premier League	8	0	0	0	1	0	—		9	0
Everton	2024–25	Premier League	1	0	0	0	0	0	—		1	0
Everton	Total		127	3	8	1	11	1	4	0	150	5
West Bromwich Albion (loan)	2018–19	Championship	19	1	2	0	—		2 (Note: Appearances in Championship play-offs)	0	23	1
Southampton (loan)	2023–24	Championship	5	0	2	0	—		—		7	0
Sheffield United (loan)	2023–24	Premier League	10	0	—		—		1 (Note: Appearance in Premier League Cup)	1	10	1
West Bromwich Albion (loan)	2024–25	Championship	26	1	1	0	—		—		27	1
Al-Gharafa	2025–26	Qatar Stars League	2	0	0	0	1	0	5 (Note: Appearances in AFC Champions League Elite)	0	8	0
Al-Sailiya	2025–26	Qatar Stars League	2	0	1	0	1	0	—		4	0
Career total			211	6	16	1	13	1	11	1	251	9

=== International ===
As of match played 19 November 2025

Appearances and goals by national team and year
National team	Year	Apps	Goals
Jamaica	2024	2	0
Jamaica	2025	5	0
Total		7	0
