= 2025–26 Fleetwood Town F.C. season =

118th season in existence of Fleetwood Town FC

Fleetwood Town
2025–26 season
- Chairman: Jamie Pilley
- Head Coach: Pete Wild (until 25 January); Matt Lawlor (from 17 March)
- Stadium: Highbury Stadium
- League Two: 15th
- FA Cup: Third round (eliminated by Port Vale)
- EFL Cup: First round (eliminated by Barnsley)
- EFL Trophy: Round of 16 (eliminated by Doncaster Rovers)
Home colours	Away colours	Third colours

The 2025–26 season was the 118th season in the history of Fleetwood Town Football Club and their second consecutive season in League Two. In addition to the domestic league, the club also participated in the FA Cup, the EFL Cup, and the EFL Trophy.

== Managerial changes ==
On 25 January, Pete Wild was sacked as head coach after sixty one games in charge and a win ratio of 34.43%. Seven weeks later, after being in interim charge, the club appointed Matt Lawlor as the new head coach on a two-year contract.

== Transfers ==
=== In ===
Date	Pos.	Player	From	Fee	Ref.
11 June 2025	CB	(England) Toby Mullarkey	(England) Crawley Town	Undisclosed	
17 June 2025	CF	(England) Will Davies	(England) Sutton United	Undisclosed	
1 July 2025	CB	(England) Thomas Bentley-Waite	(England) Accrington Stanley	Free	
1 July 2025 (Note: The transfer was announced on 27 June, and would become official on July 1 once his contract at Grimsby had expired)	LB	(England) Denver Hume	(England) Grimsby Town	Free	
1 July 2025	CF	(Albania) Donnie O'Boyle	(England) Millwall	Free	
18 July 2025	CF	(England) James Norwood	(England) Oldham Athletic	Free	
25 July 2025	CF	(Wales) Ched Evans	(England) Preston North End	Free	
26 August 2025	CF	(Northern Ireland) Lewis McCann	(Scotland) Dunfermline Athletic	Free	
27 August 2025	CM	(Wales) Jordan Davies	(Wales) Wrexham	Free	
31 January 2026	CB	(England) Rhys Bennett	(England) Manchester United	Undisclosed	

=== Out ===
Date	Pos.	Player	To	Fee	Ref.
20 June 2025	LW	(Scotland) Phoenix Patterson	(England) Stevenage	£200,000	
3 July 2025	CM	(England) Reece Wilkes	(England) Norwich City	Undisclosed	
4 July 2025	CB	(England) Brendan Sarpong-Wiredu	(England) Plymouth Argyle	£300,000	
18 July 2025	CF	(Republic of Ireland) Tommy Lonergan	(Republic of Ireland) Waterford	Free Transfer	
10 August 2025	LB	(United Arab Emirates) Mackenzie Hunt	(United Arab Emirates) Baniyas	Undisclosed	
9 January 2026	CF	(Republic of Ireland) Ryan Graydon	(England) Salford City	£400,000 (Note: Rising to potential £600,000 with add-ons)	
15 January 2026	GK	(Wales) David Harrington	(England) Bolton Wanderers	Undisclosed	
30 January 2026	CM	(Northern Ireland) Jack Doherty	(Northern Ireland) Crusaders	Free Transfer	
25 February 2026	CF	(England) Lucas Taylor	(England) Blyth Spartans	Free Transfer	

Income: ▲£900,000 (not inc. undisclosed transfers and any add-ons)

=== Loaned in ===
Date	Pos.	Player	From	Date until	Ref.
2 July 2025	CF	(Republic of Ireland) Calum Costello	(Republic of Ireland) Waterford	31 May 2026	
2 July 2025	CF	(Republic of Ireland) Zak O'Sullivan	(Republic of Ireland) Waterford	31 May 2026	
1 September 2025	RW	(England) Ethan Ennis	(England) Manchester United	31 May 2026	
15 January 2026	LB	(England) Josh Powell	(England) Nottingham Forest	31 May 2026	
2 February 2026	RB	(Wales) Mitch Clark	(England) Port Vale	31 May 2026	
2 February 2026	CF	(England) Esapa Osong	(England) Nottingham Forest	31 May 2026	

=== Loaned out ===
Date	Pos.	Player	To	Date until	Ref.
6 September 2025	CF	(England) Owen Devonport	(England) FC Halifax Town	2 January 2026	
15 December 2025	GK	(Northern Ireland) Stephen McMullan	(Republic of Ireland) Waterford	30 November 2026	
29 January 2026	CB	(England) Zech Medley	(England) Bromley	31 May 2026	
23 February 2026	CB	(England) Will Johnson	(Republic of Ireland) Waterford	30 November 2026	
3 March 2026	CF	(England) Mikey Lane	(England) Hereford	31 May 2026	

=== Released / Out of Contract ===
Date	Pos.	Player	Subsequent club	Join date	Ref.
30 June 2025	AM	(England) Callum Dolan	(England) Torquay United	1 July 2025	
30 June 2025	CM	(England) Toby Oliver	(England) Lancaster City	3 July 2025	
30 June 2025	RM	(Wales) Ryan Broom	(England) Cheltenham Town	25 July 2025	
30 June 2025	CM	(England) Danny Mayor			

=== New Contract ===
Date	Pos.	Player	Contract until	Ref.
20 June 2025	CB	(England) Harrison Holgate	Undisclosed	
29 June 2025	DM	(Scotland) Crispin McLean	30 June 2027 (Note: First professional contract)	
1 July 2025	GK	(England) Oliver Bellizia	Undisclosed	
1 July 2025	RB	(Montserrat) Raff Cirino	Undisclosed	
1 July 2025	CM	(Northern Ireland) Jack Doherty	Undisclosed	
1 July 2025	CB	(Northern Ireland) Conor Haughey	Undisclosed	
1 July 2025	CF	(England) Mikey Lane	Undisclosed	
15 July 2025	CB	(England) Finley Potter	30 June 2027	
15 December 2025	GK	(Northern Ireland) Stephen McMullan	30 June 2028 (Note: Includes an option for a further year)	
9 January 2026	CB	(England) Harrison Holgate	30 June 2026	
2 February 2026	CB	(Northern Ireland) Conor Haughey	30 June 2029	

== Pre-season and friendlies ==
On 5 June, Fleetwood Town announced their pre-season scheduled, with friendlies against Bamber Bridge, Isle of Man, Altrincham or Radcliffe and Coleraine. Also confirmed was four behind-closed-doors matches against FC Halifax Town, Morecambe, Blackpool and Manchester United U21s.

Win Draw Loss Fixtures

5 July 2025 Friendly	Bamber Bridge	0–4	Fleetwood Town	Bamber Bridge
15:00 BST		Report	Graydon 16', 43'; Davies 64'; Trialist 90'	Stadium: Sir Tom Finney Stadium

8 July 2025 Friendly	Fleetwood Town	2–0	FC Halifax Town	Thornton-Cleveleys
12:00 BST	Trialist 11'; Helm 80'	Report		Stadium: Poolfoot Farm; Attendance: 0 (behind-closed-doors)

12 July 2025 Friendly	Burnley	1–0	Fleetwood Town	Padiham
15:00 BST		Report		Stadium: Burnley FC Training Centre; Attendance: 0 (behind-closed-doors)

15 July 2025 Friendly	Fleetwood Town	3–0	Blackpool	Thornton-Cleveleys
11:00 BST	Hume; Devonport; Neal	Report		Stadium: Poolfoot Farm; Attendance: 0 (behind-closed-doors)

18 July 2025 Friendly	Isle of Man	2–3	Fleetwood Town	Douglas
19:00 BST	Booth 42'; Higgins 80'	Report	Bolton 27'; Graydon 73'; Helm 88'	Stadium: The Bowl

20 July 2025 Friendly	Radcliffe	0–0	Fleetwood Town	Douglas
15:00 BST				Stadium: The Bowl

26 July 2025 Friendly	Fleetwood Town	2–1	Coleraine	Fleetwood
15:00 BST	Graydon 36'; Potter 44'	Report	Patching 76'	Stadium: Highbury Stadium

29 July 2025 Friendly	Fleetwood Town	0–1	Manchester United U21	Thornton-Cleveleys
13:00 BST		Report		Stadium: Poolfoot Farm; Attendance: 0 (behind-closed-doors)

== Competitions ==
=== League Two ===
==== League table ====
Pos	Team	Pld	W	D	L	GF	GA	GD	Pts
13	Walsall	46	18	11	17	56	56	0	65
14	Bristol Rovers	46	19	5	22	56	65	−9	62
15	Fleetwood Town	46	15	16	15	57	58	−1	61
16	Accrington Stanley	46	14	11	21	47	58	−11	53
17	Gillingham	46	13	14	19	53	72	−19	53

Source: EFL Official Website
Rules for classification: 1) Points; 2) Goal difference; 3) Number of goals scored; 4) Head-to-head results; 5) Wins; 6) Away goals; 7) Penalty points (sec 9.5); 8) 12-point sending off offences

==== Results summary ====
Overall								Home						Away					
Pld	W	D	L	GF	GA	GD	Pts	W	D	L	GF	GA	GD	W	D	L	GF	GA	GD
46	15	16	15	57	58	−1	61	8	10	6	35	35	0	7	6	9	22	23	−1

Last updated: complete.
Source: Soccerway

==== Matches ====
On 26 June, the League Two fixtures were announced, with Fleetwood visiting Barnet on the opening day.

Win Draw Loss Fixtures

2 August 2025 1	Barnet	0–2	Fleetwood Town	Edgware
15:00 BST		Report	Davies 22'; Bonds 50'	Stadium: The Hive Stadium; Attendance: 3,709; Referee: Aaron Bannister

9 August 2025 2	Fleetwood Town	2–1	Bristol Rovers	Fleetwood
15:00 BST	Davies 26', 34', (yellow card) 83'	Report	Omochere (yellow card) 42', (goal) 74' (pen.); Thomas (yellow card) 90+5'; McEachran (yellow card) 90+7'	Stadium: Highbury Stadium; Referee: Seb Stockbridge

16 August 2025 3	Bromley	2–2	Fleetwood Town	Bromley
15:00 BST	Dinanga 30'; Pinnock (yellow card) 42'; Charles (yellow card) 64'; Kabamba 73'; Hondermarck (yellow card) 85'; Webster (yellow card) 90+4'	Report	Bolton 8'; Neal (yellow card) 57'; Norwood 90+3'; Evans (yellow card) 90+4'	Stadium: Hayes Lane; Attendance: 1,472 (56 Away); Referee: Oliver Mackey

19 August 2025 4	Fleetwood Town	1–4	Crewe Alexandra	Fleetwood
19:45 BST	Davies (yellow card) 56'; Rooney (yellow card) 57'; Lynch (yellow card) 67'; Evans (yellow card) 76'; Norwood 77' (pen.), (yellow card) 83'; Morrison (yellow card) 90+4'	Report	Mullarkey 1' (o.g.); March 22'; Agius 50'; Hutchinson 55'; Lunt (yellow card) 67'; Demetriou (yellow card) 76'; Booth (yellow card) 81'	Stadium: Highbury Stadium; Attendance: 2,529; Referee: Thomas Kirk

23 August 2025 5	Fleetwood Town	1–1	Oldham Athletic	Fleetwood
15:00 BST	Evans 12'; Johnson (yellow card) 22'; Potter (yellow card) 87'	Report	Ogle 44'	Stadium: Highbury Stadium; Attendance: 3,682 (1,157 away); Referee: Benjamin Speedie

30 August 2025 6	Barrow	0–1	Fleetwood Town	Barrow-in-Furness
12:30 BST	Canavan (red card) 10'; Barkhuizen (yellow card) 26'; Smith (yellow card) 49'	Report	Graydon 37'; Bonds (yellow card) 66'; Neal (yellow card) 90'; Norwood (yellow card) 90+5'	Stadium: Holker Street; Attendance: 3,325 (328 away); Referee: Martin Woods
Note: Fixture was originally scheduled for a 15:00 kick-off, but was moved live Sky Sports broadcasting.

6 September 2025 7	Notts County	1–0	Fleetwood Town	Nottingham
15:00 BST	Dennis 46', (yellow card) 73'; Gordon (yellow card) 52'; Palmer (yellow card) 53'	Report	Rooney (yellow card) 42'; Potter (yellow card) 79'; Graydon (yellow card) 90+1'	Stadium: Meadow Lane; Attendance: 9,068 (222 away); Referee: Stephen Parkinson

13 September 2025 8	Fleetwood Town	1–1	Walsall	Fleetwood
15:00 BST	Graydon 16'; Bolton (yellow card) 37'	Report	Kanu 25'; Harper (yellow card) 56'	Stadium: Highbury Stadium; Attendance: 3,267; Referee: Neil Hair

20 September 2025 9	Cambridge United	2–1	Fleetwood Town	Cambridge
12:30 BST	Ball (yellow card) 38'; Mayor 67'; Lavery 69'	Report	Davies 62'	Stadium: Abbey Stadium; Attendance: 5,069 (98 away fans); Referee: Lee Swabey
Note: Fixture was originally scheduled for a 15:00 kick-off, but was moved live Sky Sports broadcasting.

27 September 2025 10	Fleetwood Town	4–2	Colchester United	Fleetwood
15:00 BST	Ennis 30'; Davies 55', 87'; Helm 90+2'	Report	Lisbie 3'; Payne 39' (pen.)	Stadium: Highbury Stadium; Attendance: 2,298 (151 away fans); Referee: Edward Duckworth

4 October 2025 11	Cheltenham Town	2–0	Fleetwood Town	Cheltenham
15:00 BST	Harmon (yellow card) 53'; Hutchinson 66'; Martin 69'	Report	Helm (yellow card) 31'; Bonds (yellow card) 50'; Mullarkey (yellow card) 61'; Neal (yellow card) 90+4'	Stadium: Whaddon Road; Attendance: 3,662; Referee: Sam Mulhall

11 October 2025 12	Fleetwood Town	3–2	Harrogate Town	Fleetwood
15:00 BST	Davies 31'; Bonds 72'; Graydon 78'	Report	Burrell 16'; Muldoon 56'	Stadium: Highbury Stadium; Attendance: 2,393 (205 away); Referee: Darren Drysdale

18 October 2025 13	Chesterfield	1–1	Fleetwood Town	Chesterfield
15:00 BST	Markanday 25'; Tanton (yellow card) 39'	Report	Davies 7'; Virtue (yellow card) 68'; Neal (yellow card) 81'; Bonds (yellow card) 90+4'	Stadium: SMH Group Stadium; Attendance: 7,641; Referee: Dean Whitestone

25 October 2025 14	Fleetwood Town	2–1	Accrington Stanley	Fleetwood
12:30 BST	Davies (yellow card) 22'; Graydon 65', (penalty missed) 80'; Evans 71'	Report	Henderson 11', (yellow card) 67'; O'Brien (yellow card) 74'; Coyle (yellow card) 81'	Stadium: Highbury Stadium; Attendance: 2,552; Referee: Tom Reeves
Note: Fixture was originally scheduled for a 15:00 kick-off, but was moved live Sky Sports broadcasting.

8 November 2025 15	Crawley Town	2–1	Fleetwood Town	Crawley
15:00 GMT	Flower 38'; Flint (yellow card) 50'; Forster 65'; Radcliffe (yellow card) 75'; Williams (yellow card) 90+5'	Report	Medley (yellow card) 4' (yellow-red card) 10'; Graydon (yellow card) 35'; Bolton 78', (yellow card) 90+6'	Stadium: Broadfield Stadium; Attendance: 2,879; Referee: Lee Swabey

15 November 2025 16	Fleetwood Town	1–1	Swindon Town	Fleetwood
15:00 GMT	Graydon 45+2'	Report	Kilkenny (yellow card) 28'; Tafazolli 31', (yellow card) 48'; Nichols (yellow card) 83'	Stadium: Highbury Stadium; Attendance: 3,041; Referee: Richard Eley

22 November 2025 17	Fleetwood Town	3–1	Shrewsbury Town	Fleetwood
15:00 GMT	Bolton (yellow card) 19' (yellow-red card) 90+4'; Graydon 24'; McCann 56'; Virtue 72'	Report	Kabia 83'; Aneke (yellow card) 90+4'	Stadium: Highbury Stadium; Attendance: 2,731 (466 away); Referee: Martin Coy

29 November 2025 18	Milton Keynes Dons	2–1	Fleetwood Town	Denbigh
12:30 GMT	Méndez-Laing 37' (pen.), (yellow card) 62'; Ekpiteta (yellow card) 56'; Nemane 68'	Report	Evans 72'	Stadium: Stadium MK; Attendance: 6,221; Referee: Andrew Humphries
Note: Fixture was originally scheduled for a 15:00 kick-off, but was moved live Sky Sports broadcasting.

9 December 2025 19	Fleetwood Town	1–1	Salford City	Fleetwood
19:45 GMT	Neal (yellow card) 21'; Hughes (yellow card) 67'; Virtue 82'	Report	N'Mai 26', (yellow card) 44'	Stadium: Highbury Stadium; Attendance: 2,353; Referee: Seb Stockbridge

13 December 2025 20	Newport County	0–2	Fleetwood Town	Newport
15:00 GMT	Lloyd (yellow card) 37'; Spellman (yellow card) 45+2' (yellow-red card) 56'; Glennon (yellow card) 79'	Report	McCann (yellow card) 32'; Potter 44'; Graydon 45+4'; Davies (yellow card) 86'	Stadium: Rodney Parade; Attendance: 3,358; Referee: Matt Corlett

20 December 2025 21	Fleetwood Town	2–1	Gillingham	Fleetwood
15:00 GMT	McCann (yellow card) 28'; Graydon (yellow card) 45+1', (goal) 53'; Potter (yellow card) 48'; Evans (penalty missed) 82'; Medley 85'	Report	Dack 14'; Little (yellow card) 52'; Nevitt (yellow card) 58'	Stadium: Highbury Stadium; Attendance: 3,001; Referee: Stephen Parkinson

26 December 2025 22	Tranmere Rovers	1–0	Fleetwood Town	Birkenhead
15:00 GMT	Bristow (yellow card) 11'; Whitaker 23', (yellow card) 90+6'; Blacker (yellow card) 33'; Dennis (yellow card) 37'; Smith (yellow card) 80'	Report	Neal (yellow card) 76'; Evans (yellow card) 90+7'	Stadium: Prenton Park; Attendance: 7,933; Referee: Dale Baines

29 December 2025 23	Salford City	0–0	Fleetwood Town	Kersal
19:45 GMT	Oluwo (yellow card) 5'; Cooper (yellow card) 58'	Report	Hughes (yellow card) 27'; Potter (yellow card) 81'	Stadium: Moor Lane; Attendance: 2,851; Referee: Martin Woods

1 January 2026 24	Fleetwood Town	0–1	Grimsby Town	Fleetwood
15:00 GMT	Evans (yellow card) 20'; Neal (yellow card) 45+4'; McCann (yellow card) 62'	Report	Rodgers (yellow card) 53'; Burns (yellow card) 78'; Kabia 89'	Stadium: Highbury Stadium

17 January 2026 27	Fleetwood Town	1–2	Cambridge United	Fleetwood
15:00 GMT	Evans (yellow card) 39'; Helm (yellow card) 73'; Ennis 74' (pen.); Mullarkey (yellow card) 90+6'	Report	Kaikai 31'; Gibbons 82'	Stadium: Highbury Stadium; Attendance: 2,666; Referee: Craig Hicks

24 January 2026 28	Colchester United	2–1	Fleetwood Town	Colchester
15:00 GMT	Lisbie 14'; Mbick 38'; Gape (yellow card) 88'; Goodwin (yellow card) 90+7'; Edwards (yellow card) 90+8'	Report	Bonds (yellow card) 72'; Ennis 79'; Powell (yellow card) 80'	Stadium: Colchester Community Stadium; Attendance: 4,994; Referee: Charles Breakspear

27 January 2026 29	Harrogate Town	1–2	Fleetwood Town	Harrogate
19:45 GMT	Morris (yellow card) 24'; Headman (yellow card) 75'; Marsh 81'	Report	Evans 45+3'; Davies (yellow card) 56'; Haughey (yellow card) 78'; Bonds (yellow card) 85'; Virtue 90+1'	Stadium: Wetherby Road; Attendance: 1,951; Referee: Oliver Mackey

31 January 2026 30	Fleetwood Town	1–2	Notts County	Fleetwood
15:00 GMT	Holgate (yellow card) 59'; Davies 65', (yellow card) 70'	Report	Jatta 38', (yellow card) 52'; Belshaw (yellow card) 56'; Dennis (yellow card) 64', (goal) 70'; Norburn (yellow card) 81'	Stadium: Highbury Stadium; Referee: Ross Joyce

7 February 2026 31	Fleetwood Town	1–2	Bromley	Fleetwood
15:00 GMT	Helm 64'; Mullarkey (yellow card) 80'; Haughey (yellow card) 90'		Hondermarck (yellow card) 5'; Kabamba 68'; Arthurs (yellow card) 90', (goal) 90+1'	Stadium: Highbury Stadium; Attendance: 2,409; Referee: Neil Hair

14 February 2026 32	Oldham Athletic	1–1	Fleetwood Town	Oldham
15:00 GMT	Stevens 78'		Helm 45+2'; Powell (yellow card) 62'; Davies (yellow card) 65'	Stadium: Boundary Park; Attendance: 6,639; Referee: Alan Dale

17 February 2026 33	Crewe Alexandra	0–1	Fleetwood Town	Crewe
19:45 GMT		Report	Helm 21'; Powell (yellow card) 32'; Ennis (yellow card) 67'; Rooney (yellow card) 82'	Stadium: Gresty Road; Attendance: 4,341; Referee: Ross Martin

21 February 2026 34	Fleetwood Town	3–2	Barrow	Fleetwood
12:30 GMT	Lynch (yellow card) 11'; Osong 64'; Evans (yellow card) 73'; McLean 89'; Stanway 90+4' (o.g.)	Report	Gordon 12' (pen.), (yellow card) 86'; Canavan 34'; Harper (yellow card) 45+2'; Jackson (yellow card) 90+2'	Stadium: Highbury Stadium; Attendance: 2,943; Referee: Elliot Bell
Note: Fixture was originally scheduled for a 15:00 kick-off, but was rescheduled for live Sky Sports broadcasting.

28 February 2026 35	Fleetwood Town	0–0	Newport County	Fleetwood
15:00 GMT				Stadium: Highbury Stadium; Attendance: 2,506; Referee: Scott Jackson

3 March 2026 25	Walsall	0–1	Fleetwood Town	Bescot
19:45 GMT			Helm 15'	Stadium: Bescot Stadium; Attendance: 4,795; Referee: Steven Copeland
Note: Fixture was originally scheduled for 4 January, but it was postponed due to a frozen pitch.

7 March 2026 36	Gillingham	1–1	Fleetwood Town	Gillingham
15:00 GMT	Palmer-Houlden 61'		Rooney 90+1'	Stadium: Priestfield Stadium; Attendance: 5,297; Referee: Lewis Sandoe

10 March 2026 26	Fleetwood Town	2–2	Cheltenham Town	Fleetwood
19:45 GMT	Helm 17', 45+1'		Thomas 57'; Hutchinson 74'	Stadium: Highbury Stadium; Attendance: 2,255; Referee: David Rock
Note: Fixture was originally scheduled for 10 January, but it was postponed due to progression to the FA Cup third round.

14 March 2026 37	Fleetwood Town	0–0	Tranmere Rovers	Fleetwood
15:00 GMT		Report	Smith (yellow card) 38'; Obiero (yellow card) 42'; Brough (yellow card) 43'	Stadium: Highbury Stadium; Attendance: 3,204; Referee: Emily Heaslip

17 March 2026 38	Grimsby Town	1–0	Fleetwood Town	Cleethorpes
19:45 GMT	Kacurri (yellow card) 59'; Kabia 90+6'	Report	Neal (yellow card) 55'; Powell (yellow card) 72'; Clark (yellow card) 77'; Rooney (yellow card) 90+4'	Stadium: Blundell Park; Attendance: 5,463; Referee: Wayne Cartmel

21 March 2026 39	Fleetwood Town	1–0	Crawley Town	Fleetwood
15:00 GMT	Helm (yellow card) 34'; Evans 57'; Neal (yellow card) 90+3'	Report		Stadium: Highbury Stadium; Attendance: 2,638; Referee: Martin Woods

28 March 2026 40	Swindon Town	1–1	Fleetwood Town	Swindon
15:00 GMT	Tafazolli (yellow card) 25'; Kirkman (yellow card) 28'; Bodin 45+3'; Knight-Lebel (yellow card) 86'	Report	Neal (yellow card) 18'; Potter (yellow card) 41'; Helm 57'; Clark (yellow card) 69'; Davies (yellow card) 86'	Stadium: County Ground; Attendance: 7,743; Referee: Michael Barlow

3 April 2026 41	Bristol Rovers	1–0	Fleetwood Town	Horfield
15:00 BST	Balmer (yellow card) 40'; Quigley 66'; Young (yellow card) 69'; Forde (yellow card) 77'; Leigh (yellow card) 90'	Report	Rooney (yellow card) 26'; Ennis (penalty missed) 42'; Neal (yellow card) 45+2'; Lynch (yellow card) 84'; Davies (yellow card) 90+6'	Stadium: Memorial Stadium; Attendance: 10,160; Referee: Darren Drysdale

6 April 2026 42	Fleetwood Town	2–5	Barnet	Fleetwood
15:00 BST	Rooney (red card) 45+1'; Neal 51'; Potter (yellow card) 65'; Helm 69' (pen.); Powell (yellow card) 76'	Report	Shelton (yellow card) 9'; Crichlow (yellow card) 21'; Stead 45+3'; Hartigan 47'; Glover (yellow card) 65'; Tshimanga 77' (pen.), 79'; Jaiyesimi 90+4'	Stadium: Highbury Stadium; Attendance: 2,605; Referee: Declan Bourne

11 April 2026 43	Accrington Stanley	1–2	Fleetwood Town	Accrington
15:00 BST	Woods 51'; Matthews (yellow card) 72'; Coyle (yellow card) 90+4'	Report	Davies (yellow card) 9'; Helm 12'; Haughey (yellow card) 67'; Osong 90+1'	Stadium: Crown Ground; Attendance: 1,993; Referee: Richie Watkins

18 April 2026 44	Fleetwood Town	1–1	Chesterfield	Fleetwood
15:00 BST	Evans 67'	Report	McFadzean (red card) 61'; Stirk 89'	Stadium: Highbury Stadium; Referee: Ross Martin

25 April 2026 45	Shrewsbury Town	2–2	Fleetwood Town	Shrewsbury
15:00 BST	Gray (yellow card) 61'; Ruffels 72'; Kabia 90+6'	Report	Perry 40' (o.g.); McLean 59'; Davies (yellow card) 61'; Cirino (yellow card) 90+4'	Stadium: New Meadow; Attendance: 5,665; Referee: Harrison Blair

2 May 2026 46	Fleetwood Town	1–1	Milton Keynes Dons	Fleetwood
15:00 BST	Coughlan 24'	Report	Paterson 37'	Stadium: Highbury Stadium; Attendance: 4,477; Referee: Stephen Parkinson

=== FA Cup ===
Fleetwood were drawn at home to Barnet in the first round, to Luton Town in the second round and away to Port Vale in the third round.

Win Draw Loss Fixtures

1 November 2025 First round	Fleetwood Town	2–1	Barnet	Fleetwood
15:00 GMT	Medley 11'; Neal (yellow card) 63'; Holgate 86'	Report	Stead 89'	Stadium: Highbury Stadium; Attendance: 1,076; Referee: Scott Jackson

6 December 2025 Second round	Fleetwood Town	2–2 (4–2 p)	Luton Town	Fleetwood
15:00 GMT	Ennis 65', 83'; Graydon (yellow card) 68'	Report	Yates 73'; Johnson (yellow card) 74'; Nelson (yellow card) 78'; Mengi 90+3'	Stadium: Highbury Stadium; Attendance: 1,180; Referee: Oliver Yates
	Penalties
	Coughlan (penalty scored); Ennis (penalty scored); Holgate (penalty scored); Neal (penalty scored)		Kodua (penalty scored); Naismith (penalty scored); Brown (penalty missed); Walsh (penalty missed)

9 January 2026 Third round	Port Vale	1–0	Fleetwood Town	Burslem
19:30 GMT	Shipley 45+2', (yellow card) 69'; Gauci (yellow card) 85'	Report	Mullarkey (yellow card) 25'; Neal (yellow card) 52'	Stadium: Vale Park; Attendance: 3,366; Referee: Benjamin Speedie

=== EFL Cup ===
Fleetwood were drawn away to Barnsley in the first round.

Win Draw Loss Fixtures

13 August 2025 First round	Barnsley	2–2 (5–4 p)	Fleetwood Town	Barnsley
19:45 BST	Russell 15'; Mullarkey 59' (o.g.); Cooper (yellow card) 90+8'	Report	Mullarkey 45+1'; Devonport 90+4'	Stadium: Oakwell; Attendance: 3,259; Referee: Carl Brook

=== EFL Trophy ===
Fleetwood were drawn against Accrington Stanley, Port Vale and Leeds United U21 in the group stage. After finishing second in the group stage, Town were drawn away to Tranmere Rovers in the round of 32. and to Doncaster Rovers in the round of 16.

Pos	Div	Team	Pld	W	PW	PL	L	GF	GA	GD	Pts	Qualification
1	L1	Port Vale	3	2	0	1	0	9	4	+5	7	Advance to Round 2
2	L2	Fleetwood Town	3	1	2	0	0	9	5	+4	7	Advance to Round 2
3	L2	Accrington Stanley	3	1	0	1	1	5	6	−1	4	
4	ACA	Leeds United U21	3	0	0	0	3	3	11	−8	0	

Source: EFL

Win Draw Loss Fixtures

2 September 2025 North Group G	Fleetwood Town	2-2 (5-4 p)	Accrington Stanley	Fleetwood
19:00 BST	Norwood 37' (yellow card) 55'; Mullarkey (yellow card) 73'; Ennis 75'; Davies (yellow card) 90+5'	Report	Heath 3' Henderson 32' Smith (yellow card) 47' Kelly (yellow card) 76' Sinclair (yellow card) 78'	Stadium: Highbury Stadium; Attendance: 550; Referee: Peter Wright
	Penalties
	Davies (penalty missed); Davies (penalty scored); Helm (penalty scored); Ennis (penalty missed); Norwood (penalty scored); Devonport (penalty scored); Johnson (penalty scored)		Madden (penalty missed); Woods (penalty missed); Popoola (penalty scored); Caton (penalty scored); Heath (penalty scored): Love (penalty scored); Sinclair (penalty missed)

7 October 2025 North Group G	Fleetwood Town	4–0	Leeds United U21	Fleetwood
19:00 BST	Norwood 4', 52', 87'; Davies 30'; Neal (yellow card) 68'; Morrison (yellow card) 70'	Report		Stadium: Highbury Stadium; Attendance: 689; Referee: Declan Brown

11 November 2025 North Group G	Port Vale	3–3 (2–4 p)	Fleetwood Town	Burslem
19:00 GMT	Shipley 53'; Brown 56'; Hall 80'	Report	Helm 32'; Medley 70', 83'	Stadium: Vale Park; Attendance: 723; Referee: Jamie O'Connor
	Penalties
	Stockley (penalty missed); Curtis (penalty scored); Paton (penalty scored); Byers (penalty missed)		Helm (penalty scored); Davies (penalty scored); Graydon (penalty scored); Ennis (penalty scored)

2 December 2025 Round of 32	Tranmere Rovers	0–3	Fleetwood Town	Birkenhead
19:00 GMT		Report	Potter (yellow card) 54'; Brough 56' (o.g.); Coughlan 71'; Medley (yellow card) 76'; Helm 88'	Stadium: Prenton Park; Referee: Aaron Bannister

13 January 2026 Round of 16	Doncaster Rovers	3–1	Fleetwood Town	Doncaster
19:00 GMT	Sharp 25', 52'; Adelakun 84'; Molyneux (yellow card) 90+4'	Report	Davies 90', (yellow card) 90+5'; Bonds (yellow card) 90+3'	Stadium: Eco-Power Stadium; Attendance: 1,506; Referee: Richard Eley

== Statistics ==
=== Appearances and goals ===
Players with no appearances are not included on the list; italics indicated loaned in player

No.	Pos	Nat	Player	Total		League Two		FA Cup		EFL Cup		EFL Trophy	
No.	Pos	Nat	Player	Apps	Goals	Apps	Goals	Apps	Goals	Apps	Goals	Apps	Goals
2	DF	(England) ENG	Rhys Bennett	3	0	1+2	0	0+0	0	0+0	0	0+0	0
3	DF	(England) ENG	Zech Medley	28	4	14+7	1	2+1	1	0+0	0	3+1	2
4	DF	(England) ENG	James Bolton	22	2	19+1	2	2+0	0	0+0	0	0+0	0
5	DF	(England) ENG	Finley Potter	34	1	27+3	1	0+1	0	1+0	0	2+0	0
6	MF	(Guyana) GUY	Elliot Bonds	48	2	39+3	2	3+0	0	0+0	0	2+1	0
7	FW	(England) ENG	Esapa Osong	16	2	5+11	2	0+0	0	0+0	0	0+0	0
8	MF	(England) ENG	Matty Virtue	42	3	22+12	3	1+2	0	1+0	0	3+1	0
9	FW	(England) ENG	Will Davies	50	7	28+14	6	2+1	0	0+0	0	3+2	1
10	MF	(England) ENG	Mark Helm	55	12	38+8	10	2+1	0	0+1	0	3+2	2
11	FW	(England) ENG	James Norwood	24	6	5+13	2	0+1	0	1+0	0	4+0	4
13	GK	(England) ENG	Jay Lynch	47	0	46+0	0	0+0	0	0+0	0	1+0	0
14	FW	(Northern Ireland) NIR	Lewis McCann	22	1	12+3	1	2+1	0	0+0	0	3+1	0
15	MF	(Wales) WAL	Jordan Davies	18	4	5+10	3	1+0	0	0+0	0	0+2	1
16	FW	(England) ENG	Ethan Ennis	46	6	36+3	3	3+0	2	0+0	0	2+2	1
17	FW	(Wales) WAL	Ched Evans	47	6	23+18	6	1+2	0	1+0	0	1+1	0
18	DF	(England) ENG	Harrison Holgate	24	1	19+1	0	2+0	1	0+1	0	1+0	0
19	FW	(Republic of Ireland) IRL	Ronan Coughlan	15	2	6+5	1	0+1	0	0+0	0	1+2	1
20	MF	(England) ENG	Harrison Neal	51	1	31+12	1	3+0	0	1+0	0	3+1	0
22	DF	(England) ENG	Josh Powell	18	0	14+4	0	0+0	0	0+0	0	0+0	0
23	MF	(Scotland) SCO	George Morrison	14	0	1+8	0	0+0	0	1+0	0	4+0	0
24	DF	(Wales) WAL	Mitch Clark	14	0	9+5	0	0+0	0	0+0	0	0+0	0
25	DF	(England) ENG	Will Johnson	4	0	1+1	0	0+0	0	1+0	0	1+0	0
26	DF	(Scotland) SCO	Shaun Rooney	26	1	23+0	1	0+1	0	1+0	0	1+0	0
29	FW	(England) ENG	Owen Devonport	18	1	4+10	0	0+1	0	0+1	1	0+2	0
32	DF	(England) ENG	Kayden Hughes	25	0	16+1	0	2+1	0	0+0	0	4+1	0
33	DF	(England) ENG	Denver Hume	9	0	7+1	0	0+0	0	0+1	0	0+0	0
34	DF	(England) ENG	Liam Roberts	9	0	1+4	0	0+1	0	1+0	0	1+1	0
35	DF	(Northern Ireland) NIR	Conor Haughey	24	0	18+1	0	1+0	0	0+0	0	4+0	0
38	MF	(Scotland) SCO	Crispin McLean	9	2	1+7	2	0+0	0	0+0	0	0+1	0
39	DF	(Montserrat) MSR	Raff Cirino	2	0	0+2	0	0+0	0	0+0	0	0+0	0
44	DF	(England) ENG	Toby Mullarkey	28	1	16+5	0	1+1	0	1+0	1	4+0	0
Players who featured but departed the club during the season:
1	GK	(Wales) WAL	David Harrington	8	0	0+0	0	3+0	0	1+0	0	4+0	0
7	FW	(Republic of Ireland) IRL	Ryan Graydon	29	8	19+5	8	2+0	0	0+1	0	0+2	0
