= Owen Devonport =

English footballer (born 2005)

Personal information
- Full name: Owen Nicholas Devonport
- Date of birth: 9 October 2004 (age 22)
- Place of birth: Burnley, England
- Height: 6 ft 1 in (1.86 m)
- Position: Forward

Team information
- Current team: Buxton

Youth career
- 2012–2023: Accrington Stanley

Senior career*
Years	Team	Apps	(Gls)
2022–2024	Accrington Stanley	0	(0)
2022	→ Padiham (loan)	9	(2)
2023	→ Clitheroe (loan)	1	(0)
2023	→ Clitheroe (loan)	2	(0)
2024–2026	Fleetwood Town	37	(1)
2024	→ King's Lynn Town (loan)	20	(3)
2025–2026	→ FC Halifax Town (loan)	17	(2)
2026–	Buxton	13	(0)
- * Club domestic league appearances and goals as of 23:24, 1 November 2026 (UTC)

Owen Nicholas Devonport (born 9 October 2004) is an English professional footballer who plays as a forward for Buxton.

== Career ==
Devonport was born and raised in Burnley, Lancashire and attended Unity College in the town, representing the Burnley Town team and Lancashire Schoolboys. He joined Accrington Stanley at the age of eight in 2012 and progressed through the academy at the club, earning a two-year scholarship starting at the 2021–22 season. He scored 21 goals in 67 appearances for the Under-18 and Under-23 squads and even made his debut for the first team in a pre-season friendly against Bolton Wanderers, aged 15. He had his first taste of senior football in February 2022 when he was sent out on loan to North West Counties Football League Premier Division side Padiham, spending the remainder of the season there, scoring three goals in thirteen appearances. In February 2023, he joined Northern Premier League Division One West side Clitheroe on a work experience loan for the remainder of the season, but only made one appearance.

He was rewarded with his first professional contract with Accrington in July 2023 and promoted to the first team, signing a one-year deal. In September 2023, he was sent back out on loan to Clitheroe on a 28-day loan deal, making a further four appearances in all competitions. Upon his return, he made his professional debut for Accrington on 21 November 2023, replacing Ben Woods as a substitute in the 2–1 defeat to Nottingham Forest U21 in the EFL Trophy group stage. This proved to be his only senior appearance for the club, as he was released early from his contract on 5 January 2024.

He joined the development squad at fellow EFL League Two side Fleetwood Town on the same day on an 18-month deal until 2025. He was immediately sent out on loan to National League North club King's Lynn Town until the end of the 2023–24 season. Manager Adam Lakeland said that "he's a big, imposing figure on the pitch who is good in the air, holds the ball up, looks to bring others into play and has a competitive nature to his play". He started regularly for the Linnets as their form picked up in the second half of the campaign to guide them away from the relegation zone.

He was appointed captain for the development squad in the 2024–25 season and started in red-hot form with 10 goals in the first 8 games. He made his first team debut for Fleetwood on 8 October 2024 in the 3–0 EFL Trophy group stage win over Barrow and subsequently signed a one-year contract extension until 2026 on 19 November 2024, with a one-year option in the club's favour. Manager, Charlie Adam, gave Devonport his League Two debut on 4 December 2024 in a 4–2 defeat to Doncaster Rovers, coming on as a late substitute. He became more of a regular once Pete Wild was appointed for the second half of the campaign and scored his first professional goal in a 4–2 win away at Milton Keynes Dons in March 2025. He finished the season fully integrated into the first team with 24 appearances in League Two.

On 6 September 2025, Devonport moved to National League club FC Halifax Town on loan until 2 January 2026, joining up with former manager Adam Lakeland. Devonport had moved down the pecking order at Fleetwood following their summer signings of James Norwood, Ched Evans and Will Davies and the loan was seen to provide valuable game time. He scored his first goal for Halifax in his second outing, helping to rescue a point at home to Eastleigh in a 2–2 draw having been two goals down. He scored his first professional hat-trick on 21 October 2025 in a 3–0 win over Leeds United U21 in the National League Cup.

On 15 May 2026, Fleetwood announced he would be leaving in the summer when his contract expired.

He signed for Buxton in summer 2026.

== Career statistics ==
As of match played 25 April 2026

Appearances and goals by club, season and competition
Club	Season	League			FA Cup		EFL Cup		Other		Total	
Club	Season	Division	Apps	Goals	Apps	Goals	Apps	Goals	Apps	Goals	Apps	Goals
Padiham (loan)	2021–22	NWCFL Premier Division	9	2	—		—		4 (Note: Appearances in NWCFL Challenge Cup)	1	13	3
Clitheroe (loan)	2022–23	NPL Division One West	1	0	—		—		—		1	0
Clitheroe (loan)	2023–24	NPL Division One West	2	0	—		—		2 (Note: Appearance(s) in FA Trophy)	0	4	0
Accrington Stanley	2023–24	League Two	0	0	0	0	0	0	1 (Note: Appearance(s) in EFL Trophy)	0	1	0
King's Lynn Town (loan)	2023–24	National League North	20	3	—		—		—		20	3
Fleetwood Town	2024–25	League Two	24	1	0	0	0	0	1	0	25	1
Fleetwood Town	2025–26	League Two	13	0	1	0	1	1	2	0	17	1
Fleetwood Town	Total		37	1	1	0	1	1	3	0	42	2
FC Halifax Town (loan)	2025–26	National League	17	2	2	0	—		5 (Note: Four appearances and four goals in National League Cup, one in FA Trophy)	4	24	6
Career total			86	8	3	0	1	1	15	5	105	14
