= Kayden Hughes =

English footballer (born 200?)

Personal information
- Full name: Kayden Hughes
- Date of birth: 28 November 2005 (age 20)
- Place of birth: Blackpool, England
- Height: 1.86 m (6 ft 1 in)
- Positions: Centre-back; left-back

Team information
- Current team: Fleetwood Town
- Number: 32

Youth career
- 2017–2024: Fleetwood Town

Senior career*
| Years | Team | Apps | (Gls) |
| 2024– | Fleetwood Town | 26 | (2) |
| 2024 | → Macclesfield (loan) | 2 | (0) |
- * Club domestic league appearances and goals as of 09:33, 1 October 2026 (UTC)

Kayden Hughes (born 28 November 2005) is an English professional footballer who plays as a defender for EFL League Two club Fleetwood Town.

== Career ==
Hughes joined the academy at Fleetwood Town at the under-12 level from local grassroots team Bispham Juniors Football Federation (BJFF). He started a two-year scholarship at the club in the summer of 2022. He was awarded the captaincy in the 2023–24 season for the under-18 team under Mark Yeates, having impressed in the previous campaign deputising for Will Johnson, who was out on loan. He turned professional at the club in March 2024 on an eighteen month deal, with a one-year option in the club's favour, having featured regularly for the under-18's and played a handful of games for the under-21's in the Professional Development League.

On 28 March 2024, Hughes joined Northern Premier League Premier Division side Macclesfield on loan until the end of the 2024–25 season. He struggled to break into the side during his loan spell, mainly featuring as an unused substitute. In total he played two games for the Silkmen, against Bamber Bridge and Whitby Town, in weakened sides once Macclesfield had missed out in the title race to Radcliffe and were consigned to the play-offs.

Following the end of his scholarship and Fleetwood's relegation to EFL League Two, Hughes was promoted into the first team. He made his professional debut on 27 August 2024, starting in the 2–1 win over EFL League One side Rotherham United in the EFL Cup second round at Highbury Stadium, stating it as a "dream come true". He was singled out for praise by Fleetwood manager Charlie Adam for his performance in a 2–0 win at Cheltenham Town on 28 September. Three days later he scored his first professional goals with a second half brace in a 6–2 win away at Walsall. On 28 October, having been a constant figure in the first team setup, he signed a new long-term contract with the club until the summer 2027 with the club holding a one-year option. After signing his new contract he only made two more appearances after missing a chunk of the 2024–25 season with injury, combined with a change in manager in Pete Wild.

== Career statistics ==
As of match played 6 October 2026

Appearances and goals by club, season and competition
| Club | Season | League | | | FA Cup | | EFL Cup | | Other | | Total | |
| Club | Season | Division | Apps | Goals | Apps | Goals | Apps | Goals | Apps | Goals | Apps | Goals |
|---|---|---|---|---|---|---|---|---|---|---|---|---|
| Macclesfield (loan) | 2023–24 | NPL Premier Division | 2 | 0 | — | | — | | 0 | 0 | 2 | 0 |
| Fleetwood Town | 2024–25 | League Two | 8 | 2 | 1 | 0 | 2 | 0 | 2 (Note: Appearance(s) in EFL Trophy) | 0 | 13 | 2 |
| Fleetwood Town | 2025–26 | League Two | 17 | 0 | 3 | 0 | 0 | 0 | 5 | 0 | 25 | 0 |
| Fleetwood Town | 2026–27 | League Two | 1 | 0 | 0 | 0 | 0 | 0 | 2 | 0 | 3 | 0 |
| Fleetwood Town | Total | | 26 | 2 | 4 | 0 | 2 | 0 | 9 | 0 | 41 | 2 |
| Career total | | | 28 | 2 | 4 | 0 | 2 | 0 | 9 | 0 | 43 | 2 |
