= Stephen McMullan =

Northern Irish footballer (born 2004)

Personal information
- Full name: Stephen Desmond Soraghan McMullan
- Date of birth: 31 December 2004 (age 21)
- Place of birth: Armagh, Northern Ireland
- Height: 1.67 m (5 ft 6 in)
- Position: Goalkeeper

Team information
- Current team: Fleetwood Town

Youth career
- Woodview Celtic
- –2019: Dundalk
- 2019–2022: Warrenpoint Town

Senior career*
Years	Team	Apps	(Gls)
2020–2022	Warrenpoint Town	10	(0)
2022–	Fleetwood Town	3	(0)
2024	→ Caernarfon Town (loan)	13	(0)
2025	→ Waterford (loan)	35	(0)
2026	→ Waterford (loan)	29	(0)

International career^{‡}
2021	Republic of Ireland U18	1	(0)
2022	Northern Ireland U18	2	(0)
2022	Northern Ireland U19	1	(0)
2023–	Northern Ireland U21	4	(0)
- * Club domestic league appearances and goals as of 20:25, 11 November 2026 (UTC) ‡ National team caps and goals as of 10:42, 6 August 2023 (UTC)

Stephen Desmond Soraghan McMullan (born 31 December 2004) is a Northern Irish professional footballer who plays as a goalkeeper for EFL League Two club Fleetwood Town. He has represented both the Republic of Ireland and Northern Ireland at underage level.

McMullan made his debut for Warrenpoint Town in the NIFL Premiership in January 2022 and was signed by English Football League club Fleetwood Town four months later. Since joining Fleetwood he spent time on loan at Caernarfon Town and Waterford.

== Club career ==
=== Early career ===
Born in Armagh, McMullan was raised in Dundalk, County Louth and began playing his youth football with local club Woodview Celtic, before playing for the Academy of League of Ireland club Dundalk in 2019.

=== Warrenpoint Town ===
McMullan joined Warrenpoint Town at the age of 14. He made his debut in the NIFL Premiership at the age of 17 on 15 January 2022, in a 1–0 defeat to Crusaders at Milltown.

=== Fleetwood Town ===
On 5 May 2022, he signed a two-year contract with EFL League One club Fleetwood Town. He signed a new long-term contract in January 2023 after impressing in under-18 and development squad games. He made his first-team debut for Fleetwood on 23 April 2023, in a 1–0 win over Milton Keynes Dons at Highbury Stadium. He cited regular goalkeeper Jay Lynch as an inspiration and said he was "over the moon with the opportunity". He was linked with Premier League clubs Chelsea, Newcastle United and Aston Villa over the summer.

==== Caernarfon Town loan ====
On 6 July 2024, McMullan joined Cymru Premier club Caernarfon Town on a season-long loan deal. He made 17 appearances in all competitions for the club during his loan spell.

==== Waterford loans ====
On 7 January 2025, McMullan joined League of Ireland Premier Division club Waterford on a season-long loan. He saved a penalty on 15 February 2025 in a 3–2 win away to Sligo Rovers at The Showgrounds in the opening league game of the season. He made 39 appearances in all competitions during his loan spell before returning to Fleetwood.

On 15 December 2025, it was announced that McMullan would return to Waterford on a season long loan deal. On 8 November 2026, he started in the 2026 FAI Cup final as his side were defeated 1–0 by Derry City at the Aviva Stadium. He made a total of 32 appearances for the club in his second loan season before it was confirmed that he had returned to Fleetwood following the end of the season.

== International career ==
McMullan made one appearance for the Republic of Ireland under-18 team in 2021. He was called up to the Northern Ireland under-19 squad in September 2022. He received his first call up to the Northern Ireland senior team in November 2023.

== Career statistics ==
As of match played 8 November 2026

Appearances and goals by club, season and competition
Club	Season	League			National Cup (Note: Includes FA Cup)		League Cup		Europe		Other		Total	
Club	Season	Division	Apps	Goals	Apps	Goals	Apps	Goals	Apps	Goals	Apps	Goals	Apps	Goals
Warrenpoint Town	2020–21	NIFL Premiership	0	0	0	0	0	0	—		—		0	0
Warrenpoint Town	2021–22	NIFL Premiership	10	0	0	0	0	0	—		—		10	0
Warrenpoint Town	Total		10	0	0	0	0	0	—		—		10	0
Fleetwood Town	2022–23	EFL League One	1	0	0	0	0	0	—		0	0	1	0
Fleetwood Town	2023–24	EFL League One	2	0	1	0	0	0	—		2 (Note: Appearance(s) in EFL Trophy)	0	5	0
Fleetwood Town	2024–25	EFL League Two	0	0	—		—		—		—		0	0
Fleetwood Town	2025–26	EFL League Two	0	0	0	0	—		—		0	0	0	0
Fleetwood Town	Total		3	0	1	0	0	0	—		2	0	6	0
Caernarfon Town (loan)	2024–25	Cymru Premier	13	0	0	0	0	0	4 (Note: Appearance(s) in UEFA Conference League)	0	—		17	0
Waterford (loan)	2025	League of Ireland Premier Division	35	0	2	0	—		—		2 (Note: 1 appearance in the Munster Senior Cup; 1 appearance in the 2025 League of Ireland Premier Division Promotion/Relegation play-off)	0	39	0
Waterford (loan)	2026	League of Ireland Premier Division	29	0	3	0	—		—		0 (Note: Appearance in the Munster Senior Cup)	0	32	0
Career total			90	0	6	0	0	0	4	0	4	0	104	0
