= Ryan Graydon =

Irish footballer

Personal information
- Full name: Ryan Graydon
- Date of birth: 11 April 1999 (age 27)
- Place of birth: Ballymun, Ireland
- Height: 1.88 m (6 ft 2 in)
- Positions: Striker; winger

Team information
- Current team: Salford City
- Number: 19

Youth career
- 2015–2018: Bohemians

Senior career*
Years	Team	Apps	(Gls)
2018–2019	Bohemians	13	(0)
2020–2021	Bray Wanderers	37	(5)
2022	Longford Town	18	(2)
2022–2023	Derry City	36	(4)
2023–2026	Fleetwood Town	85	(19)
2026–	Salford City	22	(3)

International career
2017	Republic of Ireland U19	1	(0)
- * Club domestic league appearances and goals as of 23:01, 1 July 2026 (UTC)

Ryan Graydon (born 11 April 1999) is an Irish professional footballer who plays as a striker for EFL League Two club Salford City.

== Career ==
Born in Dublin, Graydon was at Bohemians as a youngster, playing for their U-17 side in 2015 season and then to their U-19 team in 2016. He would make his senior debut in a League Cup win over Cabinteely at Dalymount Park on 26 March 2018.

After a spell with Bray Wanderers in which he reached the League of Ireland First Division promotion play-off final, Graydon joined Longford Town in February 2022. He joined Derry City from Longford in July 2022, agreeing to a two-and-a-half-year deal. He joined for a fee in the region of €10,000. He represented Derry in the UEFA Europa Conference League, making his debut against Riga FC on July 14, 2022. He was reported as calling playing in European competition as a "lifelong dream".

Graydon's form was such that he was a considered "a central figure" in Derry's 2022 FAI Cup Final victory over Shelbourne in November 2022. In May 2023 Derry reportedly rejected an offer from Fleetwood Town for his services. However, in July 2023, Graydon completed a move to Fleetwood Town, signing an initial two-year deal. In May 2025, he signed a new one-year contract extension.

On 9 January 2026, Graydon signed for fellow League Two club Salford City for an undisclosed fee, signing a "long-term" contract.

== International career ==
Graydon has represented the Republic of Ireland at under–19 level, appearing in a friendly against Czech Republic in September 2017.

== Style of play ==
Graydon has been described as a "versatile attacker", and winger. He has been compared to Irish international player James McClean by his manager at Derry, Ruaidhri Higgins.

== Career statistics ==
As of match played 25 May 2026

Appearances and goals by club, season and competition
Club	Season	League			National Cup (Note: Includes FAI Cup & FA Cup)		League Cup (Note: Includes League of Ireland Cup & EFL Cup)		Other		Total	
Club	Season	Division	Apps	Goals	Apps	Goals	Apps	Goals	Apps	Goals	Apps	Goals
Bohemians	2018	LOI Premier Division	1	0	0	0	2	0	2 (Note: 1 appearance in Scottish Challenge Cup, 1 appearance in Leinster Senior Cup)	0	5	0
Bohemians	2019	LOI Premier Division	12	0	2	0	2	0	3 (Note: 1 appearance in Scottish Challenge Cup, 2 appearances and 2 goals in Leinster Senior Cup)	2	19	2
Bohemians	Total		13	0	2	0	4	0	5	2	24	2
Bray Wanderers	2020	LOI First Division	18	2	1	0	0	0	1 (Note: Appearance in 2020 League of Ireland First Division Playoffs)	0	20	2
Bray Wanderers	2021	LOI First Division	19	3	0	0	–		3 (Note: Appearances in 2020 League of Ireland First Division Playoffs)	0	22	3
Bray Wanderers	Total		37	5	1	0	0	0	4	0	42	5
Longford Town	2022	LOI First Division	18	2	–		–		–		18	2
Derry City	2022	LOI Premier Division	13	2	5	0	–		2 (Note: Appearances in UEFA Europa Conference League)	0	20	2
Derry City	2023	LOI Premier Division	23	2	–		–		–		23	2
Derry City	Total		36	4	5	0	–		2	0	43	4
Fleetwood Town	2023–24	League One	27	2	1	0	1	1	3 (Note: Appearances in EFL Trophy)	1	32	3
Fleetwood Town	2024–25	League Two	34	9	1	0	3	3	1	1	39	13
Fleetwood Town	2025–26	League Two	24	8	2	0	1	0	2	0	29	8
Fleetwood Town	Total		85	19	4	0	5	4	6	2	100	24
Salford City	2025–26	League Two	22	3	2	2	–		3 (Note: Appearances in 2026 EFL League Two Playoffs)	0	27	5
Salford City	2026–27	League Two	0	0	0	0	0	0	0	0	0	0
Salford City	Total		22	3	2	2	0	0	3	0	27	5
Career total			203	31	14	2	9	4	20	4	254	43
