= Liam Roberts (footballer, born 2006) =

English footballer (born 2006)

Personal information
- Full name: Liam Anthony Roberts
- Date of birth: 24 December 2006 (age 19)
- Place of birth: Blackpool, England
- Positions: Left winger; left wing-back

Team information
- Current team: Fleetwood Town
- Number: 23

Youth career
- 2018–2025: Fleetwood Town

Senior career*
Years	Team	Apps	(Gls)
2024–	Fleetwood Town	5	(0)
2025	→ Waterford (loan)	1	(0)
2026	→ Hereford (loan)	5	(0)
- * Club domestic league appearances and goals as of 16:27, 13 September 2026 (UTC)

Liam Anthony Roberts (born 24 December 2006) is an English professional footballer who plays as a winger for EFL League Two club Fleetwood Town.

== Career ==
Roberts was born in Blackpool, Lancashire and raised in nearby Lytham St Annes. He joined local side Fleetwood Town as an eleven-year-old at under-12 level, having been initially rejected at open trials. He progressed well in the academy playing ahead of his age group on a number of occasions and made his under-18 debut in 2021 when he was at under-15 level. He also contributed to Fleetwood's record run to the fifth round in the 2022–23 FA Youth Cup campaign. In July 2022, he played a major part in the under-16's victory in the Icelandic Rey Cup, beating Brighton & Hove Albion in the final. He signed a two-year scholarship with Fleetwood in the summer of 2023.

He was given his professional debut on 3 September 2024 by first team manager Charlie Adam whilst still a second-year scholar, when he started in the 3–2 defeat to Aston Villa in the EFL Trophy group stage at Highbury Stadium. He again consistently played up a level whilst a scholar, featuring regularly for the under-21 side before penning his first professional contract in February 2025, signing a long-term deal.

On 15 February 2025, he was sent out on loan to sister club Waterford of the League of Ireland Premier Division for a season-long loan. His loan spell in Ireland didn't really work out and he returned to Fleetwood early in March 2025, having only played 3 minutes of league football against Shelbourne, despite making the bench on six occasions. His only other appearance for the club came in the Munster Senior Cup, starting in the defeat to lower league Rockmount.

He started the 2025–26 in the first team under Pete Wild, starting in the EFL Cup first round victory at Barnsley and three days later he made his EFL League Two debut, coming on as a substitute in the 2–2 draw at Bromley.

On 25 July 2026, he joined National League North club Hereford on loan until January.

== Style of play ==
Fleetwood Town academy manager, Jack Higgins, described Roberts as "an old-fashioned winger who likes to beat defenders and get crosses in the box, and has also shown his versatility within a wing-back position".

== Career statistics ==
As of match played 6 October 2026

Appearances and goals by club, season and competition
Club	Season	League			National cup (Note: Includes FA Cup)		League cup (Note: Includes EFL Cup)		Other		Total	
Club	Season	Division	Apps	Goals	Apps	Goals	Apps	Goals	Apps	Goals	Apps	Goals
Fleetwood Town	2024–25	League Two	0	0	0	0	0	0	2 (Note: Appearance(s) in EFL Trophy)	0	2	0
Fleetwood Town	2025–26	League Two	5	0	1	0	1	1	2	0	9	1
Fleetwood Town	2026–27	League Two	0	0	0	0	0	0	1	0	1	0
Fleetwood Town	Total		5	0	1	0	1	1	5	0	12	1
Waterford (loan)	2025	LOI Premier Division	1	0	—		—		1 (Note: Appearance(s) in Munster Senior Cup)	0	2	0
Hereford (loan)	2026–27	National League North	5	0	1	0	—		0	0	6	0
Career total			11	0	2	0	1	1	6	0	20	1
