= George Morrison (footballer, born 2005) =

Footballer (born 2005)

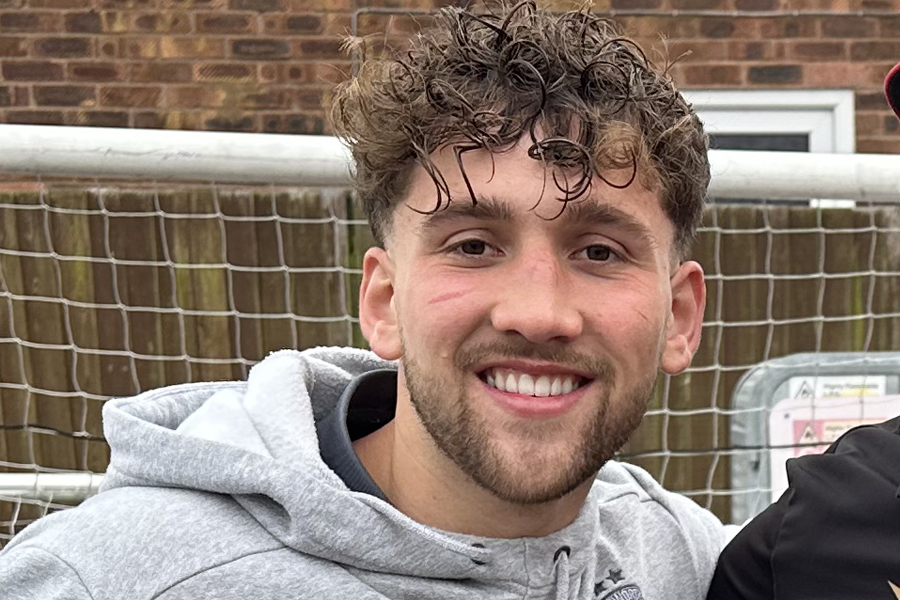
- Morrison in March 2025

Personal information
- Full name: George William Morrison
- Date of birth: 22 October 2005 (age 21)
- Place of birth: Lancaster, England
- Height: 1.77 m (5 ft 10 in)
- Position: Central midfielder

Team information
- Current team: Stoke City

Youth career
- –2015: Westgate Wanderers
- 2015–2022: Fleetwood Town

Senior career*
Years	Team	Apps	(Gls)
2022–2026	Fleetwood Town	16	(0)
2023–2024	→ King's Lynn Town (loan)	34	(2)
2024–2025	→ Tamworth (loan)	34	(0)
2026–	Stoke City	0	(0)

International career
2022–2023	Scotland U18	4	(1)
2023	Scotland U19	2	(0)
- * Club domestic league appearances and goals as of 14:11, 28 April 2026 (UTC)

George William Morrison (born 2005) is a professional footballer who plays as a right midfielder or right winger for EFL Championship club Stoke City. Born in England, he plays for the Scotland U18 national team at International level.

== Club career ==
Morrison attended Ripley St Thomas Church of England Academy in Lancaster, Lancashire and also played youth football for Westgate Wanderers up to under-11 level. Whilst at Westgate Wanderers, he was scouted by Fleetwood Town and joined the academy at the age of ten. He progressed through the age groups and went on to make his debut for the under-18 side aged only 15, contributing to the side winning the EFL North West Youth Alliance in 2021. He played a huge role for the under-18's during the 2021–22 season whilst still an under-16 player and even featured twelve times for the under-21 side.

On 24 October 2022, he signed his first professional contract with the club, putting pen to paper on a two-year deal only months after starting his two-year youth scholarship. He made his first team and professional debut on 5 November 2022 when he replaced Brendan Sarpong-Wiredu as a late substitute in the 3–1 FA Cup First round victory over Oxford City at Highbury Stadium.

On 13 October 2023, Morrison joined National League North club King's Lynn Town on an initial one-month youth loan deal. This deal was first extended until February 2024, and then until the end of the season.

In August 2024, Morrison joined newly promoted National League side Tamworth on a season-long loan deal. On 29 March 2025, Tamworth confirmed that Morrison had been recalled by his parent club. Just days after playing his final match for the Lambs and being recalled by his parent club, George Morrison made his Fleetwood Town FC and EFL debut after coming off the bench in a 4-1 win and was even involved in his sides third goal.

On 28 July 2026, it was announced that Morrison had joined EFL Championship side Stoke City for an undisclosed fee, linking up with their U21 squad.

== International career ==
On 6 September 2022, he was called up by Scotland under-18's for a three match friendly tournament at the end of the month in Limoges for the fixtures against Poland, France and Estonia. He was named as a substitute for the game against Poland, but made his debut when he was subbed on during the match. He started the next game against the home nation, France, going on to score on his first full cap in the 32nd minute.

== Career statistics ==
As of match played 2 May 2026

Appearances and goals by club, season and competition
Club	Season	League			FA Cup		EFL Cup		Other		Total	
Club	Season	Division	Apps	Goals	Apps	Goals	Apps	Goals	Apps	Goals	Apps	Goals
Fleetwood Town	2022–23	League One	0	0	1	0	0	0	0	0	1	0
Fleetwood Town	2023–24	League One	0	0	0	0	0	0	0	0	0	0
Fleetwood Town	2024–25	League Two	7	0	0	0	0	0	0	0	7	0
Fleetwood Town	2025–26	League Two	9	0	0	0	1	0	4 (Note: Appearances in EFL Trophy)	0	14	0
Fleetwood Town	Total		16	0	1	0	1	0	4	0	22	0
King's Lynn Town (loan)	2023–24	National League North	34	2	—		—		1 (Note: Appearances in FA Trophy)	0	35	2
Tamworth (loan)	2024–25	National League	34	0	3	0	—		3 (Note: Two appearances in FA Trophy, one in National League Cup)	0	40	0
Stoke City	2025–26	Championship	0	0	0	0	0	0	—		0	0
Career total			84	2	4	0	1	0	8	0	97	2
