= Ethan Ennis =

English footballer (born 2004)

Personal information
- Full name: Ethan Finley Ennis
- Date of birth: 11 December 2004 (age 21)
- Place of birth: Runcorn, England
- Height: 1.78 m (5 ft 10 in)
- Position: Winger

Team information
- Current team: Stockport County

Youth career
- Liverpool
- 2021–2025: Manchester United

Senior career*
Years	Team	Apps	(Gls)
2025–2026	Manchester United	0	(0)
2025	→ Doncaster Rovers (loan)	15	(0)
2025–2026	→ Fleetwood Town (loan)	39	(3)
2026–	Stockport County	7	(1)
- * Club domestic league appearances and goals as of 00:20, 25 October 2026 (UTC)

Ethan Finley Ennis (born 11 December 2004) is an English professional footballer who plays as a winger for EFL League One club Stockport County.

== Club career ==
=== Youth ===
Ennis started his youth career at Liverpool and began rising through the ranks. However, on 17 August 2021, he moved to rivals Manchester United after rejecting a new contract, becoming the first player in 57 years to do so. He also had interest from Chelsea at the time of the move.

The Guardian later included Ennis in their list of best talents at each Premier League club.

Ennis signed his first professional contract on 24 December 2021, two weeks after his 17th birthday.

=== Loan to Doncaster Rovers ===
On 10 January 2025, Ennis joined League Two side Doncaster Rovers on loan for the remainder of the season.

=== Loan to Fleetwood Town ===
On 1 September 2025, Ennis joined Fleetwood Town, also of League Two.

=== Stockport County ===
On 17 August 2026, Ennis signed for Stockport County of EFL League One.

== Style of play ==
Ennis has been described as having "brilliant quality on the ball", "an eye for a creative pass", and "brilliant instincts in front of goal". He has also been called, 'two-footed, commanding in the air, and jet-heeled'.

== Career statistics ==
As of match played 24 October 2026

Appearances and goals by club, season and competition
Club	Season	League			FA Cup		League Cup		Other		Total	
Club	Season	Division	Apps	Goals	Apps	Goals	Apps	Goals	Apps	Goals	Apps	Goals
Manchester United U21	2023–24	—	—		—		—		1 (Note: Appearance(s) in the EFL Trophy)	0	1	0
Manchester United U21	2024–25	—	—		—		3 (Note: Appearance(s) in the National League Cup)	4	3	2	6	6
Doncaster Rovers (loan)	2024–25	League Two	15	0	2	0	—		0	0	17	0
Fleetwood Town (loan)	2025–26	League Two	39	3	3	2	0	0	4	1	46	6
Stockport County	2026–27	League One	6	0	0	0	0	0	1	0	7	0
Career total			60	3	5	2	3	4	9	3	77	12

== Honours ==
Manchester United U18

- FA Youth Cup: 2021–22

Doncaster Rovers

- EFL League Two: 2024–25
