= Mark Helm (footballer) =

English footballer (born 2001)

Personal information
- Full name: Mark David Helm
- Date of birth: 21 October 2001 (age 25)
- Place of birth: Warrington, England
- Height: 5 ft 8 in (1.73 m)
- Position: Midfielder

Team information
- Current team: Fleetwood Town
- Number: 10

Youth career
- 2009–2021: Manchester United

Senior career*
Years	Team	Apps	(Gls)
2021–2023	Burnley	0	(0)
2023–2024	Burton Albion	56	(8)
2024–	Fleetwood Town	82	(14)
- * Club domestic league appearances and goals as of 22:32, 17 March 2026 (UTC)

Mark David Helm (born 21 October 2001) is an English professional footballer who plays as a midfielder for EFL League Two club Fleetwood Town.

== Club career ==
=== Early career ===
Born in Warrington, Helm joined Manchester United at the age of seven, before leaving the club in 2021 at the expiration of his contract. Immediately after leaving Manchester United, he signed for Burnley, citing Dwight McNeil, who had also made the move from United to Burnley, as a role model for paving the route to first-team football. His career at Burnley got off to a good start, with the midfielder earning praise for his performances in pre-season friendlies.

=== Burton Albion ===
On 12 January 2023, Helm moved to EFL League One side Burton Albion on an eighteen-month deal. He made his debut two days later, in a 4–0 home loss to Shrewsbury Town, with his first performance being described as 'tidy'.

=== Fleetwood Town ===
On 25 July 2024, Helm joined League Two side Fleetwood Town on a three-year contract.

Helm was named EFL League Two Player of the Month for March 2026 having scored or assisted in each of his side's six matches across the month.

== Style of play ==
A versatile midfielder, capable of playing in the centre of the field as a playmaker or box-to-box midfielder as well as the right-hand side, Helm drew comparisons to former Manchester United player Wayne Rooney. He is also a dead ball specialist and is known for dictating the tempo of play.

== Career statistics ==
As of match played 17 March 2026

Appearances and goals by club, season and competition
Club	Season	League			FA Cup		EFL Cup		Other		Total	
Club	Season	Division	Apps	Goals	Apps	Goals	Apps	Goals	Apps	Goals	Apps	Goals
Manchester United U21	2019–20	—	—		—		—		3 (Note: Appearances in EFL Trophy)	0	3	0
Manchester United U21	2020–21	—	—		—		—		3	2	3	2
Manchester United U21	Total		—		—		—		6	2	6	2
Burnley	2021–22	Premier League	0	0	0	0	0	0	—		0	0
Burton Albion	2022–23	League One	19	3	—		—		—		19	3
Burton Albion	2023–24	League One	37	5	2	0	1	0	4	1	44	6
Burton Albion	Total		56	8	2	0	1	0	4	1	63	9
Fleetwood Town	2024–25	League Two	44	7	1	0	3	0	3	0	51	7
Fleetwood Town	2025–26	League Two	38	7	3	0	1	0	5	2	47	9
Fleetwood Town	Total		82	14	4	0	4	0	8	2	98	16
Career total			138	22	6	0	5	0	18	5	167	27

== Honours ==
Individual

- EFL League Two Player of the Month: March 2026
