= Crispin McLean =

English footballer (born 2006)

Personal information
- Full name: Crispin Robert McLean
- Date of birth: 30 September 2006 (age 20)
- Place of birth: Old Kilpatrick, Scotland
- Position: Midfielder

Team information
- Current team: Fleetwood Town
- Number: 27

Youth career
- Rangers
- Hibernian

Senior career*
Years	Team	Apps	(Gls)
2024–	Fleetwood Town	12	(2)
2025	→ Lancaster City (loan)	6	(0)
2025–2026	→ Curzon Ashton (loan)	21	(0)
- * Club domestic league appearances and goals as of 09:41, 1 October 2026 (UTC)

Crispin Robert McLean (born 30 September 2006) is a Scottish professional footballer who plays as a midfielder for EFL League Two club Fleetwood Town.

== Career ==
McLean spent his youth with Rangers and Hibernian, before he joined Fleetwood Town. He started training with the first-team under Charlie Adam.

In June 2025, he signed a first professional two-year contract with the Cod Army before joining National League North club Curzon Ashton on an initial three-month loan, later extended until January 2026.

== Career statistics ==
As of match played 16 September 2026

Appearances and goals by club, season and competition
Club	Season	League			FA Cup		EFL Cup		Other		Total	
Club	Season	Division	Apps	Goals	Apps	Goals	Apps	Goals	Apps	Goals	Apps	Goals
Fleetwood Town	2024–25	League Two	0	0	0	0	0	0	1 (Note: Appearance(s) in the EFL Trophy)	0	1	0
Fleetwood Town	2025–26	League Two	8	2	0	0	0	0	1	0	9	2
Fleetwood Town	2026–27	League Two	4	0	0	0	3	0	0	0	7	0
Fleetwood Town	Total		12	2	0	0	3	0	2	0	17	2
Lancaster City (loan)	2024–25	Northern Premier League Premier Division	6	0	—		—		—		6	0
Curzon Ashton (loan)	2025–26	National League North	21	0	1	0	—		2 (Note: Appearance(s) in FA Trophy)	0	24	0
Career total			39	2	1	0	3	0	4	0	47	2
