= Finley Potter =

English footballer (born 2004)

Personal information
- Full name: Finley Potter
- Date of birth: 14 March 2004 (age 22)
- Place of birth: Sheffield, England
- Height: 1.82 m (6 ft 0 in)
- Position: Defender

Team information
- Current team: Fleetwood Town
- Number: 5

Youth career
- –2023: Sheffield United

Senior career*
Years	Team	Apps	(Gls)
2023–2024	Sheffield United	0	(0)
2023	→ Barnet (loan)	13	(2)
2023–2024	→ Barnet (loan)	16	(0)
2024–	Fleetwood Town	66	(2)

International career
2022	England U18	3	(0)
- * Club domestic league appearances and goals as of 09:28, 20 September 2026 (UTC)

Finley Potter (born 14 March 2004) is an English professional footballer who plays as a defender for EFL League Two club Fleetwood Town.

== Career ==
Potter came through the academy of Sheffield United, being rewarded with a scholarship deal in August 2020. His deal started in unfortunate circumstances, missing eighteen months through injury before his return to action in February 2022.

In February 2023, he joined National League club Barnet on loan for the remainder of the season. Following a successful spell, he returned for a season-long loan ahead of the 2023–24 season, being recalled in February 2024.

On 1 February 2024, Potter joined League One club Fleetwood Town on an eighteen-month contract with the option for a further year. He made his debut on the final day of the season, as already relegated Fleetwood won 3–0 against Burton Albion.

On 7 May 2025, the club announced it had activated a one-year extension for the player. On 15 July 2025, the club announced a new two year deal for Potter, keeping him at Fleetwood until 2027.

== International career ==
In May 2022, Potter was called up to the England U18 squad, going on to win the Four Nations tournament.

== Career statistics ==
As of match played 20 September 2026

Appearances and goals by club, season and competition
Club	Season	League			FA Cup		League Cup		Other		Total	
Club	Season	Division	Apps	Goals	Apps	Goals	Apps	Goals	Apps	Goals	Apps	Goals
Sheffield United	2022–23	Championship	0	0	0	0	0	0	—		0	0
Sheffield United	2023–24	Premier League	0	0	0	0	0	0	—		0	0
Sheffield United	Total		0	0	0	0	0	0	0	0	0	0
Barnet (loan)	2022–23	National League	13	2	0	0	—		3 (Note: Two appearances and one goal in FA Trophy, one appearance in National League play-offs)	1	16	3
Barnet (loan)	2023–24	National League	16	0	4	0	—		2 (Note: Appearance(s) in FA Trophy)	0	22	0
Barnet (loan)	Total		29	2	4	0	0	0	5	1	38	3
Fleetwood Town	2023–24	League One	1	0	0	0	0	0	0	0	1	0
Fleetwood Town	2024–25	League Two	28	0	1	0	0	0	3 (Note: Appearance(s) in EFL Trophy)	0	32	0
Fleetwood Town	2025-26	League Two	30	1	1	0	1	0	2	0	34	1
Fleetwood Town	2026–27	League Two	7	1	0	0	3	0	0	0	11	1
Fleetwood Town	Total		66	2	2	0	4	0	5	0	78	2
Career total			95	4	6	0	4	0	10	1	116	5
