= Raff Cirino =

English footballer (born 200?)

Personal information
- Full name: Raffaele Alexander Cirino
- Date of birth: 3 February 2007 (age 19)
- Place of birth: Blackburn, England
- Height: 1.77 m (5 ft 10 in)
- Position: Right-back

Team information
- Current team: Fleetwood Town
- Number: 29

Youth career
- 2021–2025: Fleetwood Town

Senior career*
Years	Team	Apps	(Gls)
2024–	Fleetwood Town	9	(0)
2025	→ Bamber Bridge (loan)	6	(0)

International career^{‡}
2024–	Montserrat	2	(0)
- * Club domestic league appearances and goals as of 10:23, 7 October 2026 (UTC) ‡ National team caps and goals as of 19:14, 15 October 2024 (UTC)

Raffaele Alexander Cirino (born 3 February 2007) is a professional footballer who plays as a defender for EFL League Two club Fleetwood Town. Born in England, he represents the Montserrat national team.

== Career ==
Cirino first joined Fleetwood Town at under-15 level, having been scouted at grassroots level playing in his hometown of Great Harwood. In the summer of 2023, he signed a two-year scholarship with the academy. On 8 October 2024, he was handed his professional debut by first team manager, Charlie Adam, starting in the 3–0 EFL Trophy win over Barrow. On 22 March 2025, he was sent out on loan to gain some experience at Northern Premier League Premier Division side Bamber Bridge until the end of the season. He made his debut against Macclesfield and started the following five games as Brig finished in mid-table.

On 1 July 2025, Cirino was offered his first professional contract after a successful stint in the under-18's, signing a one-year deal with the option of an extended year.

== International career ==
Cirino was called up to represent the Montserrat national team in the 2024–25 CONCACAF Nations League matches against El Salvador and Saint Vincent and the Grenadines in Bonaire.

== Personal life ==
He is the younger brother of defender Lenni Cirino who plays for Hednesford Town.

== Career statistics ==
=== Club ===
As of match played 6 October 2026

Appearances and goals by club, season and competition
Club	Season	League			FA Cup		EFL Cup		Other		Total	
Club	Season	Division	Apps	Goals	Apps	Goals	Apps	Goals	Apps	Goals	Apps	Goals
Fleetwood Town	2024–25	League Two	0	0	0	0	0	0	1 (Note: Appearance(s) in the EFL Trophy)	0	1	0
Fleetwood Town	2025–26	League Two	2	0	0	0	0	0	0	0	2	0
Fleetwood Town	2026–27	League Two	7	0	0	0	2	0	2	0	11	0
Fleetwood Town	Total		9	0	0	0	2	0	3	0	14	0
Bamber Bridge (loan)	2024–25	NPL Premier Division	6	0	—		—		—		6	0
Career total			15	0	0	0	2	0	3	0	20	0

=== International ===
As of match played 8 September 2024

Appearances and goals by national team and year
National team	Year	Apps	Goals
Montserrat
Montserrat	2024	2	0
Total		2	0
