= Will Johnson (footballer, born 2005) =

English footballer (born 2005)

Personal information
- Full name: William Jack Johnson
- Date of birth: 5 March 2005 (age 21)
- Place of birth: Stockton-on-Tees, England
- Positions: Centre-back; right-back

Team information
- Current team: Fleetwood Town
- Number: 25

Youth career
- Darlington
- –2021: Norton & Stockton Ancients
- 2021–2023: Fleetwood Town

Senior career*
Years	Team	Apps	(Gls)
2022–	Fleetwood Town	4	(0)
2022–2023	→ Barnoldswick Town (loan)	1	(0)
2023	→ Marine (loan)	9	(0)
2024	→ Gateshead (loan)	2	(0)
2026	→ Waterford (loan)	13	(0)
- * Club domestic league appearances and goals as of 10:28, 6 October 2026 (UTC)

William Jack Johnson (born 5 March 2005) is an English professional footballer who plays as a defender for EFL League Two club Fleetwood Town.

== Career ==
Johnson was born in Stockton-on-Tees, County Durham and raised in the village of Eaglescliffe in the borough. He played County & District level football and also played in the academy at Darlington. He also featured in the first team for Norton & Stockton Ancients who played senior football in the Wearside Football League. He signed a two-year scholarship at EFL League One side Fleetwood Town in the summer of 2021, joining the under-18 side managed by Simon Wiles.

On 22 November 2022, he penned his first professional contract with Fleetwood signing a two-year deal. The youngster had impressed having been made under-18's captain in the summer of 2022 when becoming a second-year scholar. In December 2022, he was sent out on loan to North West Counties Football League Premier Division side Barnoldswick Town, but only featured in one game against A.F.C. Liverpool.

He first featured in the first team squad on 1 March 2023, when he was an unused substitute for Fleetwood's record FA Cup run to the fifth round, losing to Burnley 1–0 at Turf Moor. Two days later, he was sent out on loan to Northern Premier League Premier Division side Marine until the end of the season to gain some further senior experience. He made eleven appearances for the club as they finished in 9th place but also won the Liverpool Senior Cup, beating Runcorn Linnets on penalties to lift the trophy for the first time in fifteen years.

At the beginning of the 2023–24 season he was moved up full-time to the under-21 squad and was again appointed captain. He made his professional debut on 7 November 2023, also scoring the third goal in a 4–0 win over Leicester City in the EFL Trophy group stage, having come on as a substitute at half time. In March 2024, he headed back to his native North-East when he joined National League side Gateshead on loan until the end of the season to help with their play-off push. He only featured twice during the loan as Gateshead finished in the play-off places but were unable to participate due to not meeting the entry requirements to the EFL.

He mainly featured for the under-21 squad during the 2024–25 season but did feature for the first team at the back end of the season due to injuries, making his EFL debut under Pete Wild in the 3–1 defeat to Harrogate Town on Easter Monday, replacing Rhys Bennett in the second half. He followed that up with his first start five days later in the penultimate game of the season, starting at right back in a 2–0 win over Newport County.

On 23 February 2026, it was announced that he had signed for League of Ireland Premier Division club Waterford on loan until the end of their season. The last of his 14 appearances in all competitions for the club came on 2 August 2026, before his loan spell was cut short early due to injury.

== Personal life ==
Johnson is the son of former professional defender Alan Johnson, who represented Wigan Athletic, Lincoln City, Preston North End and Rochdale in the English Football League.

== Career statistics ==
As of match played 2 August 2026

Appearances and goals by club, season and competition
Club	Season	League			National cup (Note: Includes FA Cup, FAI Cup)		League cup (Note: Includes EFL Cup)		Other		Total	
Club	Season	Division	Apps	Goals	Apps	Goals	Apps	Goals	Apps	Goals	Apps	Goals
Fleetwood Town	2022–23	League One	0	0	0	0	0	0	0	0	0	0
Fleetwood Town	2023–24	League One	0	0	0	0	0	0	1 (Note: Appearance(s) in EFL Trophy)	1	1	1
Fleetwood Town	2024–25	League Two	2	0	0	0	0	0	0	0	2	0
Fleetwood Town	2025–26	League Two	2	0	0	0	1	0	1	0	4	0
Fleetwood Town	2026–27	League Two	0	0	0	0	0	0	0	0	0	0
Fleetwood Town	Total		4	0	0	0	1	0	2	1	7	1
Barnoldswick Town (loan)	2022–23	NWCFL Premier Division	1	0	—		—		—		1	0
Marine (loan)	2022–23	NPL Premier Division	9	0	—		—		2 (Note: Appearances in Liverpool Senior Cup)	0	11	0
Gateshead (loan)	2023–24	National League	2	0	—		—		—		2	0
Waterford (loan)	2026	LOI Premier Division	13	0	1	0	—		—		14	0
Career total			29	0	1	0	1	0	4	1	35	1
