= Conor Haughey =

Northern Irish footballer

Personal information
- Full name: Conor Joseph Haughey
- Date of birth: 29 May 2007 (age 19)
- Place of birth: Belfast, Northern Ireland
- Height: 6 ft 1 in (1.85 m)
- Position: Centre-back

Team information
- Current team: Fleetwood Town
- Number: 16

Youth career
- 2018–2023: Glentoran
- 2023–2025: Fleetwood Town

Senior career*
| Years | Team | Apps | (Gls) |
| 2022–2023 | Glentoran | 0 | (0) |
| 2023– | Fleetwood Town | 25 | (0) |
| 2025 | → Lancaster City (loan) | 7 | (0) |

International career^{‡}
| 2022–2023 | Northern Ireland U16 | 4 | (0) |
| 2023–2024 | Northern Ireland U17 | 4 | (1) |
| 2024–2025 | Northern Ireland U19 | 4 | (0) |
| 2026– | Northern Ireland U21 | 2 | (0) |
- * Club domestic league appearances and goals as of 1 November 2026 ‡ National team caps and goals as of 1 November 2026

Conor Joseph Haughey (born 29 May 2007) is a Northern Irish professional footballer who plays as who plays as a defender for EFL League Two club Fleetwood Town.

== Club career ==
=== Glentoran ===
Haughey joined Glentoran as an 11–year–old in 2018, and on 6 September 2022, following a rapid rise in his development, Haughey made his first team debut against Lisburn Distillery in the County Antrim Shield, as he came on as a substitute in stoppage time during the 1–0 win. In the process, he became the youngest ever player to represent Glentoran at first team level at 15 years, three months, and eight days.

=== Fleetwood Town ===
==== Youth teams and first contract (2023–2025) ====
On 8 August 2023, Haughey left Glentoran and signed for EFL League One side Fleetwood Town on a two–year scholarship with him initially joining the under–18's. On 1 July 2025, Haughey was one of five academy graduates that penned their first professional contracts with The Cod Army.

==== Loan to Lancaster City (2025) ====
On 21 February 2025, Haughey joined Northern Premier League side Lancaster City on a 28-day work experience loan, he made his full debut for the club against Hyde United and picked up the man of the match award after the 1–0 defeat. On 24 March 2025, Haughey's loan spell at The Dolly Blues was extended until the end of the season. He went on to make seven appearances over the course of the loan deal, before returning to his parent club, Fleetwood Town at the conclusion of the loan on 7 May 2025.

==== Return to Fleetwood and first team revelation (2025-) ====
On 2 February 2026, after making his breakthrough in the first team at Fleetwood Town, Haughey signed a new three-and-a-half-year contract that committing to the club until the summer 2029 with the deal containing an additional one-year option. On 3 May 2026, following his outstanding breakout performance for the first team, Haughey was voted Fleetwood Town's Young Player of the Year.

During the following season, he made headlines in the EFL Cup on 27 October 2026, starting and playing the entire game against Arsenal in the fourth round. After holding them to a 1–1 draw, he scored the last goal of the penalty shoot-out that knocked-out the reigning Premier League champions.

== International career ==
Haughey is a Northern Ireland youth international, having represented the country at U16, where he captained them during the Victory Shield and almost found the back of the net against Republic of Ireland U16. On 18 August 2023, Haughey was called up to Northern Ireland U17s, and he made his debut on 23 August 2023; which came against Brighton & Hove Albion in the South of England. He then earned a call–up at U19 level the following August, but didn't make his debut until 13 November as he played 36 minutes against Denmark U19 in an U19 Euro Qualifier.

On 18 September 2026, Haughey was called up to the U21s for the first time ahead of 2027 UEFA European Under-21 Championship qualifiers against Malta, Georgia and Greece respectively. He made his U21 debut on 26 September 2026, coming on as a 66th minute substitute for Sam Inwood during a 4–0 win against Malta at The Centenary Stadium.

== Career statistics ==
As of match played 27 October 2026

Appearances and goals by club, season and competition
| Club | Season | League | | | National Cup (Note: Includes Irish Cup & FA Cup) | | League Cup (Note: Includes Northern Ireland Football League Cup & EFL Cup) | | Other | | Total | |
| Club | Season | Division | Apps | Goals | Apps | Goals | Apps | Goals | Apps | Goals | Apps | Goals |
|---|---|---|---|---|---|---|---|---|---|---|---|---|
| Glentoran | 2022–23 | NIFL Premiership | 0 | 0 | 0 | 0 | 0 | 0 | 1 (Note: Appearances in County Antrim Shield) | 0 | 1 | 0 |
| Fleetwood Town | 2023–24 | League One | 0 | 0 | 0 | 0 | 0 | 0 | — | | 0 | 0 |
| Fleetwood Town | 2024–25 | League Two | 0 | 0 | 0 | 0 | 0 | 0 | — | | 0 | 0 |
| Fleetwood Town | 2025–26 | League Two | 19 | 0 | 1 | 0 | 0 | 0 | 4 (Note: Appearance(s) in EFL Trophy) | 0 | 24 | 0 |
| Fleetwood Town | 2026–27 | League Two | 6 | 0 | 0 | 0 | 2 | 0 | 0 | 0 | 8 | 0 |
| Total | | | 25 | 0 | 1 | 0 | 2 | 0 | 4 | 0 | 32 | 0 |
| Lancaster City (loan) | 2024–25 | Northern Premier League; Premier Division | 7 | 0 | — | | — | | — | | 7 | 0 |
| Career total | | | 32 | 0 | 1 | 0 | 2 | 0 | 5 | 0 | 40 | 0 |

== Honours ==
Individual

- Fleetwood Town Young Player of the Year: 2025–26
