= Toby Mullarkey =

English footballer (born 1995)

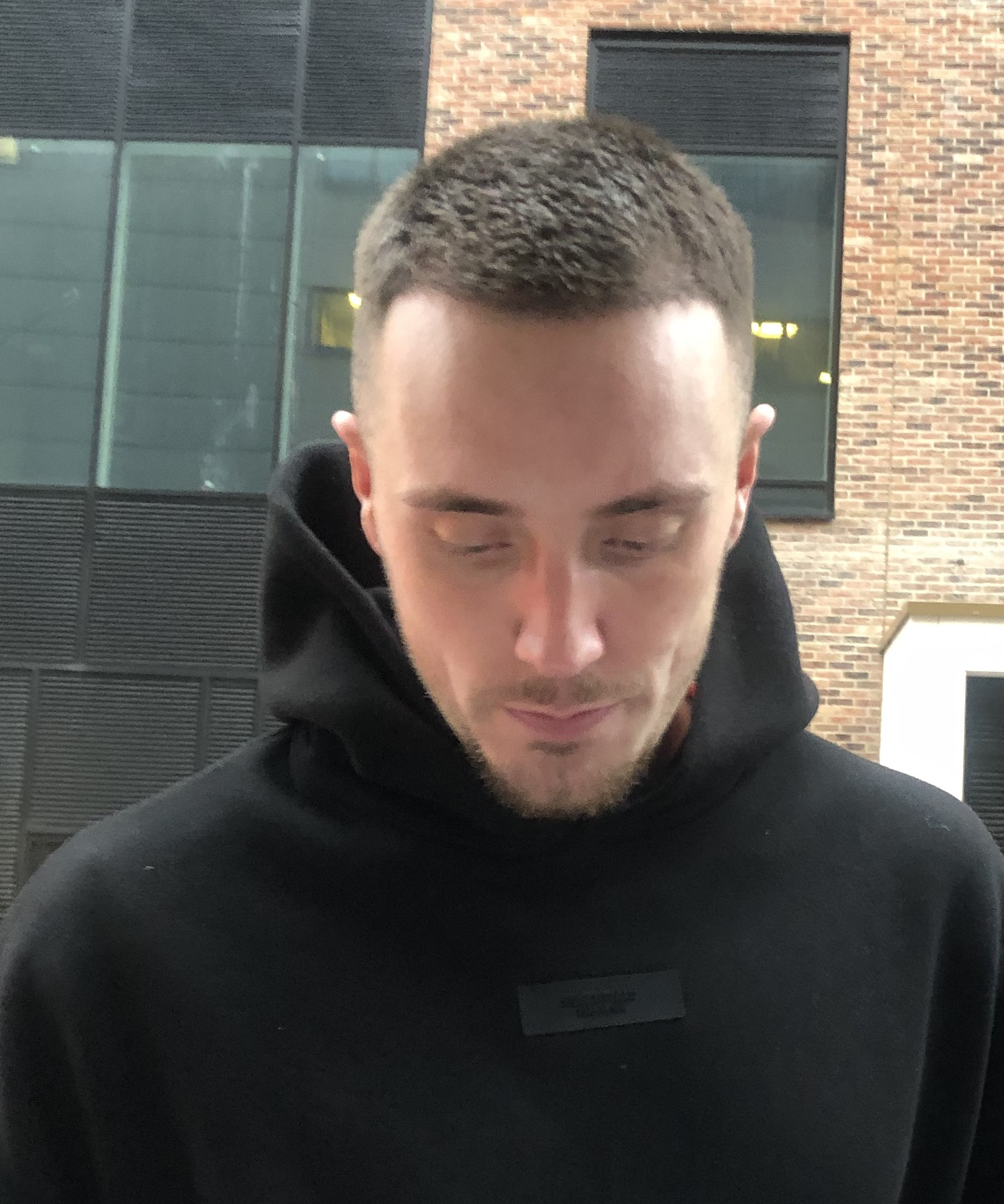
- Mullarkey in 2024.

Personal information
- Full name: Tobias Mullarkey
- Date of birth: 4 November 1995 (age 31)
- Place of birth: Warrington, England
- Height: 6 ft 3 in (1.91 m)
- Position: Defender

Team information
- Current team: Carlisle United (on loan from Fleetwood Town)

Youth career
- Crewe Alexandra
- Everton
- 2013–2015: Crewe Alexandra

Senior career*
Years	Team	Apps	(Gls)
2015–2017	Crewe Alexandra	0	(0)
2015	→ Leek Town (loan)		
2017–2019	Nantwich Town		
2019–2023	Altrincham	117	(9)
2023	Rochdale	12	(0)
2023–2024	Grimsby Town	42	(2)
2024–2025	Crawley Town	31	(0)
2025–	Fleetwood Town	21	(0)
2026–	→ Carlisle United (loan)	0	(0)
- * Club domestic league appearances and goals as of 14:17, 8 February 2026 (UTC)

Tobias Mullarkey (born 4 November 1995) is an English professional footballer who plays as a defender for National League side Carlisle United on loan from EFL League Two team Fleetwood Town.

== Career ==
Born in Warrington, Mullarkey began his career in the academy at Crewe Alexandra. After a period with Everton, Mullarkey returned to Crewe in 2013. In March 2015, Mullarkey moved on loan to Leek Town. After leaving Crewe without playing a first team match, he played non-league football for Nantwich Town and, from May 2019, for Altrincham, before signing for Rochdale in January 2023, and making his league debut in a 2–1 defeat at Salford City on 4 February 2023.

Following relegation to the National League with Rochdale at the end of the 2022–23 season, Mullarkey signed for Grimsby Town after they triggered a release clause in his contract for an undisclosed fee ahead of the 2023–24 campaign. He had been linked with a transfer to Grimsby before he signed for Rochdale.

On 9 July 2024, Mullarkey joined newly promoted League One club Crawley Town on a two-year deal for an undisclosed fee.

In June 2025 he signed for Fleetwood Town for an undisclosed fee.

On 15 May 2026 the club placed him on the transfer list.

O 27 July 2026, Mullarkey joined National League side Carlisle United on loan until January 2027.

== Style of play ==
He has been described as a "modern ball playing centre-back". He "primarily plays as a right-sided centre-half, which remains his favoured position, although has also served as a defensive central midfielder and a right-back on other occasions".

== Career statistics ==
As of match played 8 February 2026

Appearances and goals by club, season and competition
Club	Season	League			FA Cup		League Cup		Other		Total	
Club	Season	Division	Apps	Goals	Apps	Goals	Apps	Goals	Apps	Goals	Apps	Goals
Altrincham	2019–20	National League North	26	2	1	0	—		5 (Note: 2 appearances in the FA Trophy, 3 appearances in the National League North play-offs)	0	32	2
Altrincham	2020–21	National League North	31	1	1	0	—		0	0	32	1
Altrincham	2021–22	National League	39	3	2	0	—		1 (Note: Appearance(s) in the FA Trophy)	0	42	3
Altrincham	2022–23	National League	21	3	2	0	—		2	1	25	4
Altrincham	Total		117	9	6	0	0	0	8	1	131	10
Rochdale	2022–23	League Two	12	0	0	0	0	0	0	0	12	0
Grimsby Town	2023–24	League Two	42	2	3	0	1	0	2 (Note: Appearances in EFL Trophy)	0	48	2
Crawley Town	2024–25	League One	31	0	2	1	2	0	2	0	37	1
Fleetwood Town	2025–26	League Two	21	0	2	0	1	1	4	0	28	1
Career total			223	11	13	1	4	1	16	1	256	14
