= Matt Lawlor =

English football manager and former player (born 1988)

Personal information
- Date of birth: 20 August 1988 (age 38)
- Place of birth: Poulton-le-Fylde, England
- Positions: Midfielder; centre back

Team information
- Current team: Fleetwood Town

Youth career
- –2008: Blackpool

Senior career*
Years	Team	Apps	(Gls)
2007–2008	Blackpool	0	(0)
2008	→ Farsley Celtic (loan)	1	(0)
2008–2011	AFC Fylde		
2011–2021	Bamber Bridge		

Managerial career
- 2023: Fleetwood Town (caretaker)
- 2024: Fleetwood Town (caretaker)
- 2025: Waterford (caretaker)
- 2025: Waterford (caretaker)
- 2026–: Fleetwood Town
- * Club domestic league appearances and goals

Matthew Lawlor (born 20 August 1988) is an English football manager and former player. He is the current manager of EFL League Two club Fleetwood Town.

As a player, he played as high as the Conference National for Farsley Celtic. As a coach, he held numerous roles at Fleetwood and League of Ireland Premier Division partner club Waterford, including several spells as caretaker manager of both.

== Playing career ==
Born in Poulton-le-Fylde in Lancashire, Lawlor played as a midfielder and later centre back. He was a youth player for Blackpool, and played on loan for Farsley Celtic in the Conference North and later Conference National (2007–08). He made over 100 appearances for AFC Fylde. He then played for Bamber Bridge in the Northern Premier League for nine years, eventually as captain.

== Coaching career ==
Lawlor began coaching at age 26, working as a development coach for Manchester United in disadvantaged areas. In 2019, he joined Fleetwood Town as a youth coach, and two years later as their head of coaching and player development. He retired from playing in May 2021, aged 32, as he was unable to balance the commitment to Bamber Bridge with coaching Fleetwood's youths and raising his family.

Lawlor became Fleetwood's under-21 manager in December 2022, and became caretaker manager of the first team for one match on 5 September 2023 after the departure of Scott Brown. His team won 2–0 at home against Tranmere Rovers in the group stage of the EFL Trophy.

In April 2024, Lawlor moved to Fleetwood's partner club in the League of Ireland Premier Division, Waterford, as assistant manager to Keith Long. He returned to Fleetwood as under-21 manager in November that year, and after the dismissal of Charlie Adam, he was caretaker again on 26 December for a 2–0 home win over Chesterfield.

Lawlor went back to Waterford in April 2025 as caretaker manager between the tenures of Long and John Coleman, winning three games out of four. After a return to Fleetwood as an individual coach, he went back to being in interim charge of Waterford for the final four games of the season, plus a 2–1 win over Bray Wanderers in the promotion/relegation playoffs on 7 November.

Having returned to Fleetwood as part of Pete Wild's coaching staff, Lawlor succeeded him on an interim basis on 26 January 2026, until the end of the season. On 17 March, after an eight-game unbeaten run, he was made the permanent head coach on a contract until the end of the 2027–28 season.

On 27 October 2026, in the fourth round of the EFL Cup, Lawlor led Fleetwood to a 1–1 draw at home to reigning Premier League champions Arsenal, followed by a 5–3 win on penalties.

== Managerial statistics ==
As of match played 21 November 2026

Managerial record by team and tenure
Team	From	To	Record				
Team	From	To	P	W	D	L	Win %
Fleetwood Town (caretaker)	3 September 2023	10 September 2023	1	1	0	0	100.00
Fleetwood Town (caretaker)	22 December 2024	26 December 2024	1	1	0	0	100.00
Waterford (caretaker)	20 April 2025	6 May 2025	4	3	0	1	75.00
Waterford (caretaker)	28 September 2025	7 November 2025	5	2	2	1	40.00
Fleetwood Town	26 January 2026	Present	43	15	15	13	34.88
Total			54	22	17	15	40.74
