= Jay Lynch (footballer) =

English footballer

Personal information
- Full name: Jay Anthony Lynch
- Date of birth: 31 March 1993 (age 33)
- Place of birth: Salford, England
- Height: 6 ft 2 in (1.88 m)
- Position: Goalkeeper

Team information
- Current team: Fleetwood Town
- Number: 1

Youth career
- –2010: Manchester United
- 2010–2012: Bolton Wanderers

Senior career*
Years	Team	Apps	(Gls)
2012–2014	Bolton Wanderers	0	(0)
2014	Accrington Stanley	2	(0)
2014–2017	Salford City	110	(0)
2017–2019	AFC Fylde	81	(0)
2019–2022	Rochdale	50	(0)
2022–	Fleetwood Town	176	(0)
- * Club domestic league appearances and goals as of 18:38, 3 November 2026 (UTC)

Jay Anthony Lynch (born 31 March 1993) is an English professional footballer who plays as a goalkeeper for EFL League Two club Fleetwood Town.

== Career ==
=== Early career ===
Lynch worked part-time in a warehouse. His career playing youth team football for Manchester United before joining Bolton Wanderers in 2010. After playing for the club's under-18 side, he moved to the under-21 side, and was named on the bench for three Premier League games in the 2011–12 season, including against former club Manchester United. He was released by the club in June 2014 after his contract expired.

=== Accrington Stanley ===
In August 2014 Lynch signed for Accrington Stanley on non-contract terms. He made his debut as a substitute against Shrewsbury Town after starting goalkeeper Luke Simpson was sent off. In September he was released by mutual consent, having complained using his Twitter account at the lack of chances he had received, saying "talent counts for nothing nowadays, it's all politics and finances".

=== Salford City ===
He subsequently joined Salford City, making his debut on 6 September in a match against Spennymoor Town. He left the club in May 2017.

=== Fylde ===
Lynch joined newly promoted National League side AFC Fylde in June 2017, signing a two-year contract. He cited the clubs' "top-class" facilities and the need for a new challenge as his reasons for signing. In 2019, he was named the National League's goalkeeper of the year, and started at Wembley Stadium as Fylde lost 3–0 to Salford in the 2019 National League play-off final.

=== Rochdale ===
On 19 August 2019, Lynch joined League One club Rochdale on a free transfer, signing a two-year deal. He had previously turned down a new deal with AFC Fylde.

On 19 June 2021, Lynch signed a new one-year contract.

=== Fleetwood Town ===
On 13 June 2022, Lynch agreed to join Fleetwood Town on a two-year deal upon the expiration of his contract with Rochdale.

On 22 May 2025, the club announced the player had signed a new two-year deal.

On 27 October 2026, Lynch saved a penalty taken by Bruno Guimaraes of Arsenal, enabling his side to win the shootout and progress to the quarter-finals of the EFL Cup.

== Career statistics ==
As of match played 31 October 2026

Appearances and goals by club, season and competition
Club	Season	League			FA Cup		League Cup		Other		Total	
Club	Season	Division	Apps	Goals	Apps	Goals	Apps	Goals	Apps	Goals	Apps	Goals
Accrington Stanley	2014–15	League Two	2	0	0	0	0	0	0	0	2	0
Salford City	2014–15	NPL Division One North	21	0	3	0	—		0	0	24	0
Salford City	2015–16	NPL Premier Division	44	0	8	0	—		2 (Note: Appearances in 2015–16 Northern Premier League Premier Division Play-offs)	0	54	0
Salford City	2016–17	National League North	44	0	2	0	—		3 (Note: Two appearances in FA Trophy, one appearance in Manchester Premier Cup)	0	49	0
Salford City	Total		109	0	13	0	0	0	5	0	127	0
AFC Fylde	2017–18	National League	37	0	4	0	—		0	0	41	0
AFC Fylde	2018–19	National League	48	0	1	0	—		5 (Note: Appearances in FA Trophy)	0	54	0
AFC Fylde	Total		85	0	5	0	0	0	5	0	95	0
Rochdale	2019–20	League One	8	0	1	0	0	0	3 (Note: Appearance(s) in EFL Trophy)	0	12	0
Rochdale	2020–21	League One	17	0	0	0	0	0	3	0	20	0
Rochdale	2021–22	League Two	25	0	3	0	1	0	2	0	31	0
Rochdale	Total		50	0	4	0	1	0	8	0	63	0
Fleetwood Town	2022–23	League One	45	0	3	0	1	0	0	0	49	0
Fleetwood Town	2023–24	League One	44	0	1	0	1	0	2	0	48	0
Fleetwood Town	2024–25	League Two	27	0	0	0	3	0	2	0	32	0
Fleetwood Town	2025–26	League Two	46	0	0	0	0	0	1	0	47	0
Fleetwood Town	2026–27	League Two	14	0	0	0	4	0	0	0	18	0
Fleetwood Town	Total		176	0	4	0	9	0	5	0	194	0
Career total			308	0	19	0	9	0	9	0	345	0

== Honours ==
AFC Fylde

- FA Trophy: 2018–19

Individual

- Fleetwood Town Players' Player of the Season: 2022–23
- Fleetwood Town Supporters Club's Player of the Season: 2022–23
