= Will Davies (footballer) =

English footballer (born 1999)

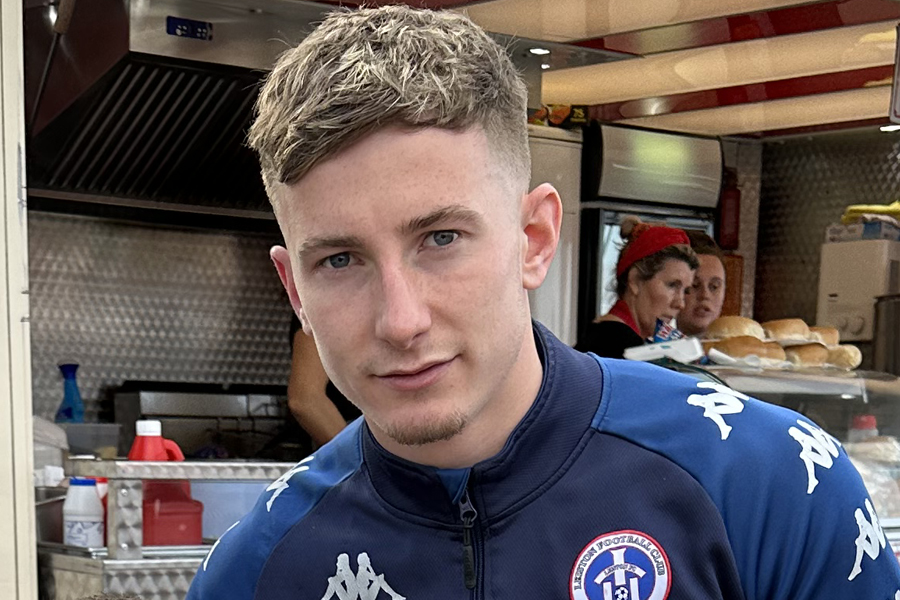
- Davies with Leiston in April 2023

Personal information
- Full name: William James Davies
- Date of birth: 7 June 1999 (age 27)
- Place of birth: Ipswich, England
- Height: 6 ft 1 in (1.85 m)
- Position: Forward

Team information
- Current team: Fleetwood Town
- Number: 9

Youth career
- Ipswich Town
- Woodbridge Town

Senior career*
Years	Team	Apps	(Gls)
2017–2018	Coplestonians	23	(19)
2018–2023	Leiston	125	(53)
2023	Braintree Town	14	(7)
2023–2024	York City	20	(5)
2024	→ Bromley (loan)	6	(0)
2024–2025	Sutton United	44	(18)
2025–	Fleetwood Town	56	(9)
- * Club domestic league appearances and goals as of 13:59, 22 November 2026 (UTC)

William James Davies (born 7 June 1999) is an English professional footballer who plays as a forward for Fleetwood Town.

== Career ==
Born in Ipswich, Davies spent time in the academy at hometown club Ipswich Town, later moving to Woodbridge Town.

Davies began his senior career with Coplestonians in the Suffolk & Ipswich League, scoring 19 goals in 23 appearances during the 2017–18 season. In the summer of 2018, Davies signed for Southern League side Leiston, initially playing for their reserves, before making his first-team debut on 16 November 2018 in a 5–1 defeat against King's Lynn Town. Whilst at Leiston, Davies was the top scorer in the 2020–21 FA Cup, scoring seven times. He moved to Braintree Town in July 2023, before signing for York City in November 2023 for an undisclosed transfer fee, moving on loan to Bromley in March 2024. After leaving York by mutual consent at the end of the 2023–24 season, he signed for Sutton United in June 2024.

Davies signed for Fleetwood Town in June 2025, for a transfer fee reported to be one of the largest ever received by Sutton. After signing, Davies scored three goals in his first two games for the club.
