= Fleetwood Town F.C. =

Association football club in Fleetwood, England

Fleetwood Town
- Full name: Fleetwood Town Football Club
- Nicknames: The Fishermen; The Cods
- Short name: The Town
- Founded: 1908 (118 years ago) (as Fleetwood); 1928 (98 years ago) (as Fleetwood Windsor Villa, later Fleetwood); 1977 (49 years ago) (second reformation as Fleetwood Town); 1997 (29 years ago) (third reformation Fleetwood Wanderers)
- Ground: Highbury Stadium
- Capacity: 5,327 (2,672 seated)
- Chairman: Jamie Pilley
- Head coach: Matt Lawlor
- League: EFL League Two
- 2025–26: EFL League Two, 15th of 24
- Website: www.fleetwoodtownfc.com
Home colours	Away colours	Third colours

Fleetwood Town Football Club is a professional association football club based in Fleetwood, Lancashire, England. The team competes in EFL League Two, the fourth level of the English football league system.

Established in 1997, the current Fleetwood Town F.C. is the fourth incarnation of the club, which was originally formed in 1908. Their home strip is red shirts with white sleeves and white shorts, and their home ground is Highbury Stadium in Fleetwood. Supporters of the club are known as the Cod Army, which is also used as a nickname for the club, alongside The Fishermen, the club's traditional nickname. They contest a rivalry with nearby Blackpool known as the Fylde Coast derby.

The original club, founded in 1908, were known simply as Fleetwood. They won the Lancashire Combination in the 1923–24 season, but resigned from the league in February 1928, due to financial difficulties. Fleetwood Windsor Villa took their place in the Lancashire Combination and won three Lancashire Combination Cups in 1933, 1934 and 1935. The club became a founder member of the newly created Northern Premier League in 1968, but folded in 1976 and reformed the following year as Fleetwood Town. They initially competed in the Cheshire County League and joined the North West Counties League in 1982. They were promoted as First Division champions in 1983–84 and reached the final of the FA Vase in the 1984–85 season; that incarnation of the club also folded in 1997.

The current club came into existence in 1997, as Fleetwood Wanderers, and won the North West Counties League First Division title in 1998–99. They changed their name to Fleetwood Town in 2002 and were taken over by Andrew Pilley two years later, who transformed the club's fortunes with significant financial investments but was jailed for fraud in 2023. Fleetwood won the North West Counties League Premier Division title in 2004–05, gained promotion out of the Northern Premier League First Division in 2005–06, won the Northern Premier League Premier Division title in 2007–08 and contested the Conference North play-offs in 2010. Fleetwood won the Conference National title in 2011–12 to secure a place in the Football League for the first time. In May 2014, Fleetwood beat Burton Albion at Wembley in the League Two play-off final and gained promotion to League One, the club's sixth promotion in ten years. They were relegated back to League Two in 2024.

== History ==
=== 1908–1997: early years and struggles ===
The current club was officially established in 1997 but football in Fleetwood dates back to 1883.

The original club, Fleetwood Rangers, played in the Lancashire Football League in the 1890s. After its demise, a new club, Fleetwood Amateur, was formed, and it dropped the Amateur aspect in 1908; its greatest honour was winning the Lancashire Combination in 1923–24. This club resigned from the Lancashire Combination in February 1928 because of financial difficulties.

In the 1928–29 season Fleetwood Windsor Villa F.C. were members of the Fylde and District Football League. At the end of that season they were elected to the West Lancashire Football League and were members for two seasons. They were then elected to the Lancashire Combination for season 1931–32, changing their name to Fleetwood F.C. They registered a hat-trick of Lancashire Combination Cup wins in 1932, 1933 and 1934. The side's goalkeeper in the first of those victories was Frank Swift, then only eighteen years old. After almost sixty years as a Lancashire Combination club, they became founder members of the newly created Northern Premier League in 1968. Great players of that era include Jack Ainscough and the late Percy Ronson, after whom one stand is named. The club finished in 10th place in its first season. As the NPL was one of several leagues immediately below Division Four of the Football League, this was effectively the fifth tier of English football, and the club would not surpass this success until 2010–11. Despite winning the Northern Premier League Cup in 1971, the club languished in the lower half of the table, finishing bottom for two successive seasons (1974–75 and 1975–76) before folding in 1976, again due to financial difficulties.

The club was re-established in 1977 as Fleetwood Town F.C., with many of the original personnel. Initially placed in Division One of the Cheshire League, it was moved in 1982 to the North West Counties League Division Two in its inaugural year, and promoted to Division One in 1984. The team reached the final of the FA Vase in 1985, losing 3–1 to Halesowen Town in front of a 16,000 crowd at Wembley. The club was placed in Division One (second tier) of the Northern Premier League when the league established a second tier in 1987, becoming the inaugural Division One Champions in 1988. In 1990–91 the club finished fourth in the NPL Premier Division, at the time effectively the sixth tier. However, by 1996, this third club had also folded due to financial issues.

=== 1997–2011: reform and promotions ===
Re-formed in 1997 as Fleetwood Wanderers F.C., the club was placed back in Division One of the North West Counties Football League (now the tenth tier of the English League system) and a sponsorship deal saw the club's name immediately changed to Fleetwood Freeport. The club was promoted to the Premier Division of the North West Counties League in 1999 and the name was reverted to Fleetwood Town in 2002. Tony Greenwood was appointed manager in 2003; soon afterwards, Andy Pilley took over as chairman. With his financial input, the club gained successive promotions as North West Counties League champions in 2005 and Northern Premier League First Division runners-up in 2006. This saw the club reach the Northern Premier League Premier Division.

Fleetwood Town won the Northern Premier League Challenge Cup in the 2006–07 season, beating Matlock Town 1–0, and finished the season just shy of the play-offs in eighth place with 67 points.

In the 2007–08 season Fleetwood won the Northern Premier League, gaining promotion to the Conference North. Along the way they set a new attendance record for the division, and were easily the best-supported team in the Premier Division.

Fleetwood town seasons

Fleetwood started the 2008–09 Conference North season poorly; with the club at the bottom of the league, manager Tony Greenwood, along with his assistant Nigel Greenwood and coach Andy Whittaker, were sacked. Greenwood was replaced by Micky Mellon, who also remained as Under-15 and Under-16 coach at Burnley. His position at Fleetwood was made full-time in January 2009, a first for the club. Fleetwood reached the Second Round Proper of the F.A. Cup for the first time in their history, but were beaten 3–2 by Hartlepool United at Highbury, in front of a then record crowd since the club's reformation of 3,280.

The demise of Farsley Celtic partway through the 2009–10 was detrimental to Fleetwood's campaign, as Farsley's entire 2009–10 playing record was expunged. Fleetwood were chasing promotion along with local rivals Southport, and the ruling cost Fleetwood three points relative to Southport. Fleetwood appealed against the decision but the appeal was rejected the day before the last match of the season, leaving Southport one point ahead. Both teams won on the final day, giving Southport the championship. Fleetwood instead had to contest the play-offs, and after beating Droylsden on penalties in the semi-final Fleetwood won promotion to the Football Conference by beating Alfreton Town 2–1 in the final.

For the 2010–11 season the club made all of its players full-time professionals, though this resulted in a few players leaving the club, including long serving club captain Jamie Milligan. The club spent most of the season in or near the play-off positions, eventually qualifying by finishing in fifth place. In the play-off semi-finals, against Wimbledon, a new attendance record of 4,112 was set in the home leg, but Fleetwood lost both games with an 8–1 aggregate scoreline.

=== 2011–present: Football League ===
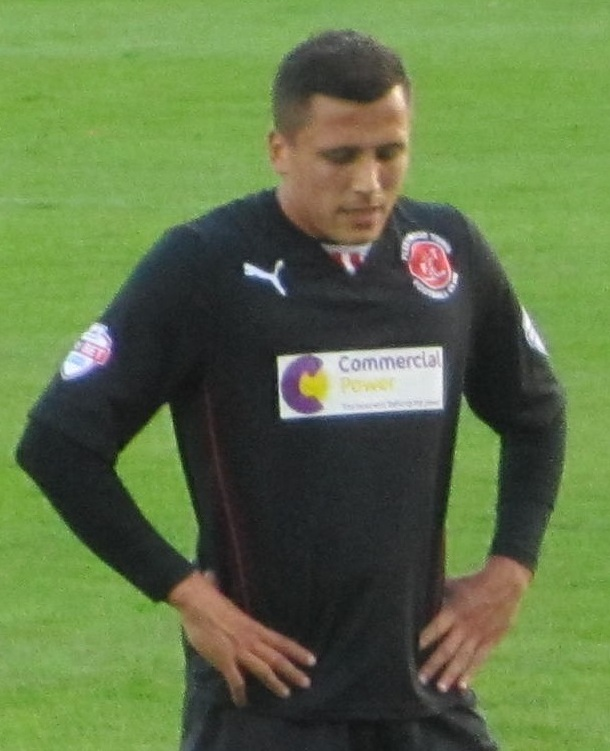
Antoni Sarcevic's free-kick in the 2014 play-off final won Fleetwood's first promotion to League One in their history.

Fleetwood's 2011–12 season was very successful. In the FA Cup, they reached the Third Round for the first time. After beating Mansfield Town, Wycombe Wanderers, and Yeovil Town, they were drawn at home to neighbours Blackpool, but lost 5–1 to the Championship club, with Jamie Vardy scoring Fleetwood's only goal in front of 5,094 supporters. In the league Fleetwood went on a 29-game unbeaten run, and were declared champions with two games remaining, giving them promotion to the Football League for the first time. At the end of the season Vardy moved to Leicester City for a fee of £1,000,000, which subsequently rose to £1,700,000 – a record transfer fee for a non-league club.

Fleetwood started the 2012–13 season well, and were third in the league after 10 games. However, they only won two of the next 10 games, slipping to sixth position; chairman Andy Pilley and manager Micky Mellon fell-out after Mellon allegedly showed interest in the Burnley and Blackpool managerial vacancies. On 1 December 2012, following a 3–2 defeat against Aldershot Town in the FA Cup, Mellon was sacked. Former Preston North End and Burnley defender Graham Alexander was appointed as manager on 6 December 2012. Fleetwood were unbeaten for the next five games, and after a steady run of results rose to fourth place after 11 games under his command. However, Fleetwood only won two of the remaining 15 games, and consequently slipped down the table to finish 13th in League Two; this resulted in a large rebuilding of the squad.

The 2013–14 season was another successful one. Having been in and around the automatic promotion places all season and getting to the League Trophy area final, the club narrowly missed out on automatic promotion, finishing in fourth place. After beating York City 1–0 on aggregate in the play-off semi-final, Fleetwood beat Burton Albion 1–0 from an Antoni Sarcevic free-kick in the play-off final at Wembley on 26 May to win promotion to League One for the first time.

==== League One years ====
Playing at the club's highest level, the 2014–15 season was very successful. After three games the team was top at the league, and remained in the top half of the league for almost the whole season, eventually finishing 10th. Notable results were away victories against Sheffield United and Rochdale and home draws against Bristol City, Preston North End, Swindon Town, Sheffield United, Rochdale and Chesterfield. Also in 2014, the club purchased a 57-bedroom hotel in Blackpool for the youth team; the following year, the club started to move into its new training ground at Poolfoot Farm in nearby Burn Naze.

The 2015–16 season was more difficult. In July 2015, chairman Andy Pilley announced a new club strategy, moving towards a self-sustaining model utilising the development and sell-on of homegrown talent to attempt to climb the league pyramid further rather than more expensive player signings. The playing budget was trimmed heavily. After a poor start to the season with only two wins in 10 league matches, Graham Alexander was sacked on 30 September 2015, with the club one point above the relegation zone after being beaten heavily 5–1 by Gillingham. On 6 October 2015 Steven Pressley was appointed manager, and guided the club to safety, five points above the relegation zone, with 10 wins in 35 league matches and an appearance in the EFL Trophy Northern Area Final. On 20 April 2016, Alex Ferguson officially opened the club's £8 million Poolfoot Farm training ground complex, which has 12 grass pitches and two floodlit 4G artificial pitches, with a gym, cafe, bar and offices.

Just before the start of the 2016–17 season, on 26 July 2016, Pressley resigned as manager. Uwe Rösler was appointed manager on 30 July 2016 and managed to guide the club to its highest ever finish of 4th place, but they were narrowly beaten 1–0 on aggregate by Bradford City in the play off semi-finals.

However, during the 2017–18 season Rösler was sacked on 17 February 2018 after seven successive defeats in all competitions and the club just above the relegation zone on goal difference alone. On 22 February 2018, former Oldham Athletic manager John Sheridan was appointed on a short-term contract until the end of the season. He successfully guided the club away from relegation to finish mid table in 14th place.

At the beginning of the 2018–19 season Joey Barton was appointed as manager. He guided the club to an 11th-place finish.

In 2019–20, the COVID-19 pandemic caused an early end to the regular season in March 2020. Teams that were in promotion play-off positions after points per game were applied entered the play-off matches in July 2020. Fleetwood Town were in 6th position and were unbeaten since losing to Burton Albion on 7 January 2020. However, they lost to Wycombe Wanderers 6–3 on aggregate in semi-final matches played behind closed doors.

The 2020–21 season was also overshadowed by COVID-19 with the vast majority of fixtures played behind closed doors. On 4 January 2021, Barton was sacked as manager with Fleetwood in 10th place. Chairman Andy Pilley described the decision as "a tough one for me to make, but I felt now was the right time for the club to go in a different direction." Barton was replaced by Simon Grayson, who guided Fleetwood to a 15th-place finish.

Fleetwood started the 2021–22 season with three wins in the opening 15 matches. On 24 November, following a 3–1 loss to Oxford United, Grayson was sacked. Stephen Crainey was appointed caretaker manager before being appointed interim manager until the end of the season. Fleetwood climbed out of the relegation zone but a run of one win in 17 league matches saw the club in the relegation places with four games remaining. After an 88th-minute equaliser at home to AFC Wimbledon, Fleetwood again climbed out of the relegation zone. On the final day, despite a 4–2 loss away to Bolton Wanderers, Fleetwood survived thanks to Gillingham's 2–0 defeat by Rotherham United.

On 12 May 2022, Fleetwood appointed ex-Celtic player Scott Brown as head coach. Fleetwood finished the 2022–23 season in 13th place with 57 points. They also reached the FA Cup fifth round, two rounds further than they had ever been, but were knocked out by Burnley at Turf Moor in a 1–0 defeat after a 90th-minute goal.

On 26 May 2023, Andy Pilley stepped down as Fleetwood Town chairman (in July 2023, he was jailed for 13 years after being found guilty of fraud offences relating to corporate energy contracts), with Steve Curwood becoming interim chairman. Fleetwood confirmed that the club was up for sale and that it had started discussions with the EFL regarding a change of ownership and control.

==== Relegation to League Two ====
Fleetwood started the 2023–24 season with six defeats in their opening seven games, resulting in the sacking of Scott Brown. Lee Johnson was appointed as Brown's replacement. However, following a poor run of form involving six consecutive losses in all competitions, Johnson was sacked on 30 December 2023 leaving Fleetwood 23rd in the league, five points from safety. Former Blackpool and Stoke City midfielder Charlie Adam was announced as head coach the following day. Fleetwood were relegated to League Two at the end of the season.

On 30 May 2024, the EFL consented to a change of owners at Fleetwood, with Jamie Pilley, son of former owner Andy Pilley, taking over. On 22 December 2024, after one win in their past 11 league games, Fleetwood Town sacked manager Charlie Adam. His successor, Pete Wild, took over on 27 December 2024, but lasted just over a year. On 25 January 2026, he was sacked; first-team coach Matt Lawlor was appointed interim head coach until the end of the season.

In the 2026–27 EFL Cup Round of 16, Fleetwood upset the reigning Premier League champion Arsenal by winning 5–3 on penalties following a 1–1 draw, advancing to the quarter-final stage for the first time.

== Highbury Stadium ==
A view of the Percy Ronson Stand in 2026, housing travelling fans from Oldham Athletic.

The original 1908 club played on a pitch next to the North Euston Hotel, where the police station now stands. Apart from two years after the First World War – when the club played on a ground opposite from the Queen's Hotel on Poulton Road (Queen's Ground) – they remained at the North Euston Ground until moving to the present ground next to the Memorial Park in 1939.

In February 2007 the new all terraced Percy Ronson Stand was opened at a cost of £500,000. Originally stated to have a capacity of 1,240, this has since been revised downwards by Lancashire County Council to 621. In July 2007, further plans for the redevelopment of the stadium were announced, including three new stands. The plans were finalised in December 2007 and in March 2008, planning permission was given for the first phase – the construction of the north and west stands. Construction began in May 2008, and the two stands were opened for Fleetwood's first home game of the 2008–09 season, on 22 August 2008. The west stand, known as the Highbury Stand, has 550 seats together with disabled and press facilities and the north stand, known as the Memorial Stand, is a terraced stand with an official capacity of 1,473. A new Football League standard floodlight system and perimeter fencing were also installed.

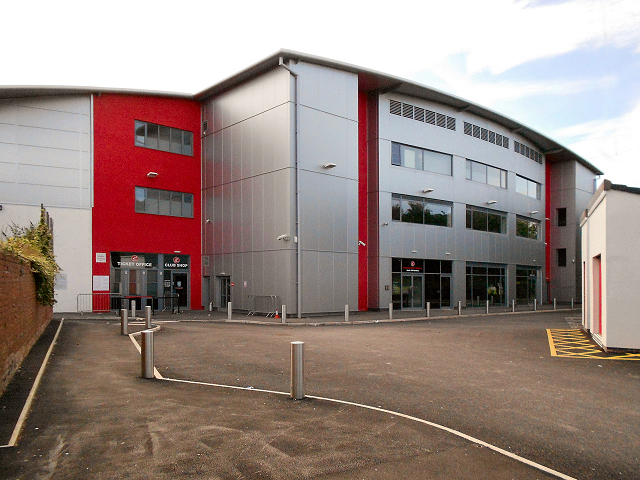
Exterior of the main stand of Highbury Stadium

The second phase development, the construction of a new East Stand, to bring the ground capacity over the 4,000 minimum required for Conference National football, was originally scheduled for the 2009 close season, but was postponed, and a £125,000 project to relay the pitch and improve drainage was instead implemented. Plans for the stand were revised and resubmitted in December 2009, and approved in March 2010. The capacity was increased to 2,000, increasing the overall ground capacity to over 5,000 and meeting the requirements of Football League membership. The stand had a proposed cost of £4,000,000. Construction began in May 2010, ahead of Fleetwood's successful Conference North play-off final against Alfreton Town. The stand, now named the Parkside Stand, was completed in the spring of 2011, and fully opened on 16 April for Fleetwood's game against Altrincham, which they won 3–1.

The stadium's current capacity is 5,327 (2,672 seated); it is the 112th largest stadium by capacity in England and was the smallest in League One during their time in the division.

For a short time from 2023 to 2026, the stadium featured electronic advertisement boards at selected games. As of September 2026, this no longer appears to be the case.

== Supporters and rivalries ==
Supporters of the club are sometimes known as the Cod Army, which is also used as a nickname for the club alongside The Fishermen, the club's traditional nickname.

Although they have only met 15 times in a competitive fixture as of the end of the 2023–24 season, Fleetwood have a growing rivalry with Fylde Coast neighbours Blackpool who, followed by Morecambe and Preston North End, are the nearest Football League clubs to Fleetwood. Fleetwood also have more traditional local rivalries against Morecambe, Southport and Barrow, all of whom have competed against Fleetwood fairly regularly when all four were non-League clubs. Other rivalries with nearby clubs have included those with Accrington Stanley, Chorley and Lancaster City.

According to a 2019 survey called 'The League of Love And Hate', Fleetwood supporters named Blackpool (83%), Morecambe (74%) and Accrington Stanley (62%) as their biggest rivals, with Preston North End (51%) and Wigan Athletic (47%) following. It may not be an entirely accurate representation, however, as the survey did not give the option of choosing non-league clubs, of whom some would more than likely feature.

== Players ==
=== First-team squad ===
As of 6 October 2026

Note: Flags indicate national team as defined under FIFA eligibility rules; some limited exceptions apply. Players may hold more than one non-FIFA nationality.

No.	Pos.	Nation	Player
1	GK	ENG	Jay Lynch
3	DF	ENG	Danny Andrew
4	MF	ENG	Harrison Neal
5	DF	ENG	Finley Potter
6	DF	ENG	Rhys Bennett
7	MF	ENG	Andy Cannon
8	MF	ENG	Kane Thompson-Sommers
9	FW	ENG	Will Davies
10	MF	ENG	Mark Helm
11	FW	WAL	Josh Thomas
14	FW	NIR	Lewis McCann

No.	Pos.	Nation	Player
15	MF	IRL	Adam Murphy (on loan from Bristol City)
16	DF	NIR	Conor Haughey
17	FW	WAL	Ched Evans (captain)
19	FW	IRL	Ronan Coughlan
20	FW	ENG	Aaron Loupalo-Bi (on loan from Fulham)
22	GK	WAL	James Pradic
24	DF	ENG	Jake Batty
25	DF	ENG	Will Johnson
26	DF	SCO	Shaun Rooney
28	MF	ENG	Josh Robertson (on loan from Brighton & Hove Albion)
32	DF	ENG	Kayden Hughes

=== Out on loan ===
Note: Flags indicate national team as defined under FIFA eligibility rules; some limited exceptions apply. Players may hold more than one non-FIFA nationality.

No.	Pos.	Nation	Player
44	DF	ENG	Toby Mullarkey (at Carlisle United until 31 May 2027)

=== U21s squad ===
As of 2 July 2026

Note: Flags indicate national team as defined under FIFA eligibility rules; some limited exceptions apply. Players may hold more than one non-FIFA nationality.

No.	Pos.	Nation	Player
27	MF	SCO	Crispin McLean
29	DF	MSR	Raff Cirino
31	MF	ENG	Pele Smith
34	GK	ENG	Ollie Bellizia
35	MF	IRL	Sean Costelloe
36	DF	IRL	Jesse Dempsey (on loan from Waterford)
39	MF	IRL	Muhammad Oladiti
40	FW	ENG	David Animasaun

No.	Pos.	Nation	Player
41	MF	ENG	Mathis Bamba
43	FW	USA	Noah Sawkins
—	DF	ENG	Will Johnson
—	DF	ENG	Adham Slater
—	DF	ENG	Joe Toole
—	MF	IRL	Calum Costello
—	MF	ENG	Jensen Stansfield
—	MF	ENG	Rylee Wilkinson

=== Out on loan ===
Note: Flags indicate national team as defined under FIFA eligibility rules; some limited exceptions apply. Players may hold more than one non-FIFA nationality.

No.	Pos.	Nation	Player
—	GK	NIR	Stephen McMullan (at Waterford until 30 October 2026)
23	MF	ENG	Liam Roberts (at Hereford until January 2026)

No.	Pos.	Nation	Player
30	FW	ENG	Mikey Lane (at Barrow until January 2026)

== Coaching staff ==
=== Football staff ===
As of 22 July 2026

Position	Staff
Head coach	Matt Lawlor
Assistant first team coach	Mark Yeates
First team coach	Nathan Pond
First team goalkeeping coach	Barry Roche
Head of Recruitment	Luke Joyce
Kit Manager	Danny Moore
Club Doctor	Dr Duncan Robertson
Head Physiotherapist	Josh O’Keefe
First Team Sports Therapist	Lloyd Balazs
Head of Performance Analyst	Lewis Appleton
Performance Analyst	Jake McLeod
Head of sports science	Jake Atherton
Assistant Head Physiotherapist	Brad Steedman

=== Academy staff ===
As of 22 July 2026

Position	Staff
Academy Manager	Danny Morville
Head of Coach and Player Development	Ash Moreau
Lead Under-21s Coach	Keith Southern
Lead Under-18s Coach	Sam Redshaw
Professional Development Phase (PDP) Coach	Bob Harris
Lead Youth Development Phase (YDP) Coach	Mike Hall
Transition Phase Lead Coach (TP)	Scott Boyle
Foundation Development Phase (FDP) Lead	Spencer Myers
Head of Goalkeeping	Reece Thompson
Head of Medical	George Barnes
Head of Sport Science	Chris Baines
Head Of Academy Performance Analysis	Danny Hastings
Head of Safeguarding	Joe Abbott
Head of Education & Player Care	Luke Hobson
Academy Head of Player Recruitment	Scott Macneill
Lead Sports Scientist	Vacant
Strength & Conditioning Coach	Vacant
Lead Physiotherapist	Niamh Conroy
Sports Therapist	Mikey Carr & Sam Waterworth
Performance Analysts	Kian Morris, Jack Fawcett, Louis Fairhurst
Education & Player Care Officier	Mason Seddon
Coaches (U9s-U16s)	Spencer Seddon, Lee Waddington, Andy Lyons, Bob Harris, Rueben Loughran, James McGown, Cameron Doherty, Lee Darbyshire, Lee Whitehead, Neil Owen
Pre-Academy Coaches	Mason Seddon, Lisa Hannigan, Kai Liddell, Jamie Richardson, Luca Hardman, Nick Dunston
Psychology	Kasim Munir

== Sponsors ==
Fleetwood Town's main kit sponsors include Commercial Power Ltd and Business Energy Solutions.

== Records ==
- Best league performance: 4th in League One (third level) 2016–17 — 48th place overall
- Best FA Cup performance: 5th Round, 2022–23
- Best EFL Cup performance: Quarter-finals, 2026–27
- Best EFL Trophy performance: Northern Area Final, 2013–14, 2015–16
- Best FA Trophy performance: 2nd Round, 2009–10
- Best FA Vase performance: Runners–up, 1984–85
- Record victory: 13–0 vs. Oldham Town on 5 December 1998, North West Counties League Division Two
- Record defeat: 0–9 vs. Bradford City on 26 November 1949, FA Cup first round, 1949–50
- Transfer fee paid: £400,000, Kyle Dempsey from Huddersfield Town May 2017
- Transfer fee received: £1,700,000, Jamie Vardy to Leicester City May 2012 (a record non-League sale)

=== Most appearances ===
- 498 – Nathan Pond (2003–2018)
- 421 – Jack Ainscough (1954–1966)
- 416 – Percy Ronson (1949–1964)

Most Football League appearances

- 209 - Alex Cairns

=== Goalscoring records ===
Record all-time goalscorer

- 101 – Dave Barnes

Record Football League goalscorer

- 43 – Paddy Madden

=== Most capped player ===
- 25 – Conor McLaughlin – Northern Ireland (2011–2017)

== Honours ==
League

- League Two (level 4)
  - Play-off winners: 2014
- Conference (level 5)
  - Champions: 2011–12
- Conference North (level 6)
  - Play-off winners: 2010
- Northern Premier League Premier Division
  - Champions: 2007–08
- Northern Premier League First Division
  - Champions: 1987–88
- North West Counties Football League Premier Division
  - Champions: 2004–05
- North West Counties Football League First Division
  - Champions: 1983–84, 1998–99
- Lancashire Combination
  - Champions: 1923–24
- Lancashire League West Division Reserve League
  - Champions: 2008–09

Cup

- FA Vase
  - Runners-up: 1984–85
- Northern Premier League Challenge Cup
  - Winners: 1971, 2007
- Northern Premier League President's Cup
  - Winners: 1990
- North West Counties Football League First Division Trophy
  - Winners: 1999
- Lancashire Combination Cup
  - Winners: 1926, 1932, 1933, 1934
- Peter Swales Memorial Shield
  - Winners: 2008
