= Pete Wild =

English football manager (born 1984)

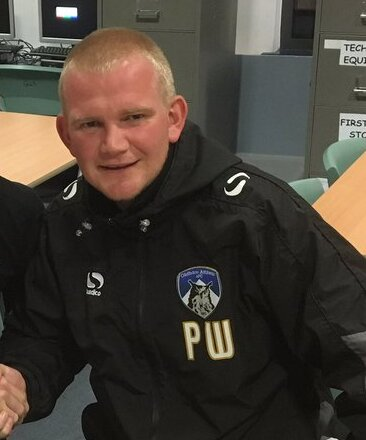
- Wild during his time at Oldham Athletic in 2019

Personal information
- Full name: Peter Lee Wild
- Date of birth: 20 July 1984 (age 42)
- Place of birth: Royton, England

Team information
- Current team: Hartlepool United (head coach)

Managerial career
- Years: Team
- 2012–2015: England Amputees
- 2018–2019: Oldham Athletic (caretaker)
- Oldham Athletic (caretaker)
- 2019: Oldham Athletic
- 2019–2022: FC Halifax Town
- 2022–2024: Barrow
- 2024–2026: Fleetwood Town
- 2026: Tranmere Rovers (interim)
- 2026–: Hartlepool United

Peter Lee Wild (born 20 July 1984) is an English football coach who is the head coach of National League club Hartlepool United.

A former amateur player, Wild progressed as a coach into professional football with Oldham Athletic. After a spell as caretaker manager, he was appointed into the role on a permanent basis in 2019. He then joined FC Halifax Town in the National League before returning to the English Football League with Barrow in 2022. After leaving Barrow after two seasons, Wild was appointed at Fleetwood Town before being sacked in 2026. He then had a short spell with Tranmere Rovers before joining Hartlepool United later that year.

== Early and personal life ==
Wild was born in Royton. He is a lifetime fan of Oldham Athletic, attending his first game at the age of six, on New Year's Day 1991. Prior to becoming a football coach, Wild worked various jobs, such as: a tree surgeon, an apprentice car mechanic and working in his parents' pubs.

== Career ==
=== Oldham Athletic ===
Wild played amateur football before taking up coaching at the age of 18. Wild's first job in coaching was with Oldham Council working in their sports department. Before he began coaching in Oldham's academy, Wild worked as a development officer at the Manchester FA. Wild also managed the England Amputee football team between 2012 and 2015.

After working for the club for 10 years, including as their interim academy manager, Wild was appointed as Oldham's caretaker manager on 27 December 2018 following the sacking of Frankie Bunn. He won his first two games in charge. On 6 January 2019 he led the club to a "famous" FA Cup victory against Premier League club Fulham, his third straight win as manager. Following the match he said that he was considering stepping down as caretaker manager, stating that "I've been an academy manager two minutes [...] the fairytale will come to an end at some point, reality will strike. And you've got to be prepared for that. I've got a family to support and a mortgage to pay". After eight matches in charge (four wins, three losses, and one draw) he was replaced as Oldham manager by Paul Scholes on 11 February 2019. Wild's final game in charge was a 3–0 away victory at Crawley Town two days previously.

In March 2019, following the resignation of Scholes, Wild returned as caretaker manager. On 22 March 2019, he was appointed the club's permanent manager, on a contract until the end of the season. He left the club in May 2019, for "personal reasons".

=== FC Halifax Town ===
On 24 July 2019, Wild was appointed the manager of National League club FC Halifax Town. In November 2019, he was linked with the vacant Grimsby Town manager's job, but he denied receiving an approach from them. Due to the COVID-19 pandemic, their final league position was decided on a points per game decision, which meant that Halifax finished in the play-off positions. However, the Shaymen lost 2–1 in the play-offs to Boreham Wood.

In the 2021–22 season, the Shaymen recorded their highest ever league finish of 4th place, qualifying for the play-offs for the second time in Wild's tenure. As a result of their positive form throughout the season, Wild was linked with the vacant job at Bradford City in February 2022. In the play-off eliminator, they lost 2–1 against Chesterfield. Wild said he was "gutted" after the defeat whilst criticising decisions of the officials in the match.

During their play-off campaign, Wild was repeatedly linked with the managerial vacancy at Barrow. On 26 May 2022, Wild resigned from Halifax to pursue a new opportunity.

=== Barrow ===
Wild was announced as the new manager of League Two club Barrow, a day after leaving Halifax. Wild led Barrow to a 9th-place finish in his first season with the club, an improvement from 22nd in the previous season.

An impressive run of form across the early months of the 2023–24 season saw Barrow equal a club record EFL winning run of four matches, climbing into the automatic promotion places. Wild's efforts in his team's achievement saw him awarded the EFL League Two Manager of the Month award for November 2023. He won the award for the second time for March 2024 with fourteen points from six matches as Barrow remained firmly in the play-off places. He left the club on 24 May 2024.

=== Fleetwood Town ===
On 24 December 2024, Wild was appointed head coach of League Two side Fleetwood Town, with his contract coming into effect three days later. Wild watched from the stands as caretaker manager Matt Lawlor oversaw a 2–0 victory over Chesterfield on Boxing Day. In his first match at the helm, Fleetwood came back from a goal behind to draw 1–1 with Harrogate Town, their final fixture of the calendar year. Having taken over with the club sat 18th in the league and eight points above the relegation zone, Wild guided them to a 14th-placed finish at the end of the season.

Wild's side made a good start to the 2025–26 campaign, closing in on the play-off places in 9th place after a 2–1 victory over Gillingham on 20 December. However, after a 2–1 defeat to Colchester United, Wild was sacked on 25 January 2026. The decision came after a run of six defeats in seven league games and a winless start to 2026. In the aftermath of his final game, Wild analysed the overwhelming level of injuries within his squad and its impact on their drop in form.

=== Tranmere Rovers ===
On 10 March 2026, Wild was appointed head coach of fellow League Two side Tranmere Rovers on an interim basis until the end of the 2025–26 season.

Wild led Tranmere to safety from relegation on the final day of the season after securing a 1–1 draw against Grimsby Town, avoiding the drop by two points. At the conclusion of the season, Tranmere announced that they had begun the process of recruiting a new manager after confirming Wild's departure; they had won just 1 of their 10 games under Wild.

=== Hartlepool United ===
On 1 October 2026, Wild was appointed head coach of National League side Hartlepool United. He took charge of his first game two days later but suffered a 1–0 home defeat to Tamworth, their ninth defeat in ten which left the club in the relegation zone. He recorded his first win in the following match, a 4–2 away victory at Forest Green Rovers.

== Managerial statistics ==
As of match played 21 November 2026

Managerial record by team and tenure
Team	From	To	Record					Ref
Team	From	To	G	W	D	L	Win %	Ref
Oldham Athletic (caretaker)	27 December 2018	11 February 2019	8	4	1	3	50.00	
Oldham Athletic	22 March 2019	7 May 2019	9	4	2	3	44.44	
FC Halifax Town	24 July 2019	26 May 2022	139	65	28	46	46.76	
Barrow	27 May 2022	24 May 2024	105	39	26	40	37.14	
Fleetwood Town	27 December 2024	25 January 2026	61	21	18	22	34.43	
Tranmere Rovers	10 March 2026	2 May 2026	10	1	3	6	10.00	
Hartlepool United	1 October 2026	Present	10	4	1	5	40.00	
Total			341	137	79	125	40.18	—

== Honours ==
Individual

- EFL League Two Manager of the Month: November 2023, March 2024
