= 2026–27 Fleetwood Town F.C. season =

119th season in existence of Fleetwood Town FC

Fleetwood Town
2026–27 season
- Chairman: Jamie Pilley
- Head coach: Matt Lawlor
- Stadium: Highbury Stadium

The 2026–27 season is the 119th season in the history of Fleetwood Town Football Club and their third consecutive season being in League Two. In addition to the domestic league, the club would also participate in the FA Cup, the EFL Cup, and the EFL Trophy.

== Transfers ==
=== In ===
| Date | Pos. | Player | From | Fee | Ref. |
|---|---|---|---|---|---|
| 1 July 2026 (Note: The transfer was announced on 17 June, and would become official on July 1 once Andrew's contract at Exeter City expired.) | LB | (England) Danny Andrew | (England) Exeter City | Free | |
| 1 July 2026 (Note: The transfer was announced on 24 June, and would become official on July 1 once Thomas' contract at Swansea City expired.) | CF | (Wales) Josh Thomas | (Wales) Swansea City | Free | |
| 2 July 2026 | CM | (England) Kane Thompson-Sommers | (England) Milton Keynes Dons | Undisclosed | |
| 10 July 2026 | CF | (Republic of Ireland) Calum Costello | (Republic of Ireland) Waterford | Free transfer | |
| 10 July 2026 | CAM | (Republic of Ireland) Sean Costelloe | (Republic of Ireland) Waterford | Free transfer | |
| 10 July 2026 | CDM | (Republic of Ireland) Muhammad Oladiti | (Republic of Ireland) Waterford | Free transfer | |
| 14 July 2026 | CM | (England) Andy Cannon | (Wales) Wrexham | Free | |
| 28 July 2026 | LB | (England) Jake Batty | (England) Swindon Town | Free | |
| 28 July 2026 | CDM | (England) Noah Mawene | (England) Preston North End | Free | |
| 28 July 2026 | GK | (Wales) James Pradic | (England) Preston North End | Free | |

=== Loan in ===
| Date | Pos. | Player | From | Loaned until | Ref. |
|---|---|---|---|---|---|
| 31 July 2026 | LB | (Republic of Ireland) Jesse Dempsey | (Republic of Ireland) Waterford | End of Season | |
| 14 August 2026 | CF | (England) Aaron Loupalo-Bi | (England) Fulham | End of Season | |
| 21 August 2026 | CM | (Republic of Ireland) Adam Murphy | (England) Bristol City | 2 January 2027 | |
| 2 September 2026 | CM | (England) Josh Robertson | (England) Brighton & Hove Albion | 5 January 2027 | |

=== Out ===
| Date | Pos. | Player | To | Fee | Ref. |
|---|---|---|---|---|---|
| 15 June 2026 (Note: The transfer was announced on 30 May, and would become official on June 15 once the transfer window opened.) | GK | (England) Luke Hewitson | (England) Chester | Undisclosed | |
| 14 July 2026 | CDM | (Guyana) Elliot Bonds | (England) Salford City | Undisclosed | |
| 28 July 2026 | CM | (Scotland) George Morrison | (England) Stoke City | Undisclosed | |

=== Loan out ===
| Date | Pos. | Player | To | Loaned until | Ref. |
|---|---|---|---|---|---|
| 25 July 2026 | LWB | (England) Liam Roberts | (England) Hereford | 30 October 2026 (Note: On 30 October, Roberts was recalled back from his initial half-season loan at Hereford.) | |
| 27 July 2026 | CB | (England) Toby Mullarkey | (England) Carlisle United | 2 January 2027 | |
| 28 July 2026 | CDM | (England) Noah Mawene | (Republic of Ireland) Waterford | 31 December 2026 | |
| 25 August 2026 | CF | (Republic of Ireland) Calum Costello | (England) Warrington Rylands | 22 September 2026 | |
| 5 September 2026 | CF | (England) Mikey Lane | (England) Barrow | 2 January 2027 | |

=== Released / Out of contract ===
| Date | Pos. | Player | Subsequent club | Joined date | Ref. |
|---|---|---|---|---|---|
| 30 June 2026 | CB | (England) Zech Medley | (England) York City | 1 July 2026 | |
| 30 June 2026 | CM | (England) Matty Virtue | (England) Swindon Town | 1 July 2026 | |
| 30 June 2026 | CF | (England) Owen Devonport | (England) Buxton | 20 July 2026 | |
| 30 June 2026 | CM | (Wales) Jordan Davies | (England) Tranmere Rovers | 21 July 2026 | |
| 30 June 2026 | CB | (England) Thomas Bentley-Waite | | | |
| 30 June 2026 | CB | (England) James Bolton | | | |
| 30 June 2026 | GK | (England) Cameron Graham | | | |
| 30 June 2026 | CB | (England) Harrison Holgate | | | |
| 30 June 2026 | CM | (England) Zack Littler | | | |
| 30 June 2026 | CF | (England) James Norwood | | | |
| 30 June 2026 | CB | (England) Alessio Ruocco | | | |
| 30 June 2026 | CB | (England) Leo Thompson | | | |
| 24 August 2026 | LB | (England) Denver Hume | Retired | | |

=== New contract ===
| Date | Pos. | Player | Contract expiry | Ref. |
|---|---|---|---|---|
| 15 May 2026 | CM | (Scotland) George Morrison | 30 June 2027 | |
| 27 May 2026 | CF | (Wales) Ched Evans | 30 June 2027 | |
| 29 May 2026 | CF | (Northern Ireland) Lewis McCann | 30 June 2028 | |
| 2 June 2026 | RB | (Scotland) Shaun Rooney | 30 June 2028 | |
| 3 June 2026 | CF | (Republic of Ireland) Ronan Coughlan | 30 June 2028 | |
| 5 June 2026 | CM | (England) Harrison Neal | 30 June 2028 | |
| 10 July 2026 | CAM | (England) David Animasaun | Undisclosed (Note: First professional contract) | |
| 10 July 2026 | GK | (England) Oliver Bellizia | Undisclosed | |
| 10 July 2026 | RB | (Montserrat) Raffaele Cirino | Undisclosed | |
| 10 July 2026 | CF | (England) Mikey Lane | Undisclosed | |
| 10 July 2026 | CM | (England) Noah Sawkins | Undisclosed | |
| 10 July 2026 | CB | (England) Adham Slater | Undisclosed | |
| 10 July 2026 | LW | (England) Jensen Stansfield | Undisclosed | |
| 10 July 2026 | RB | (England) Joe Toole | Undisclosed | |
| 10 July 2026 | CM | (England) Rylee Wilkinson | Undisclosed | |

== Pre-season and friendlies ==
On 1 June, The Cods announced their first three pre-season friendlies against Chester, Southport and Hartlepool United. Two days later, a fourth opposition was confirmed in Bolton Wanderers. A fifth and sixth fixture was later added versus Bamber Bridge and Huddersfield Town. On 6 June, a behind closed doors friendly against Carlisle United was announced.

Win Draw Loss Fixtures

| 11 July 2026 Kevin Walker Cup | Bamber Bridge | 0–5 | Fleetwood Town | Bamber Bridge |
| 13:00 BST | | Report | Helm 20'; Thompson-Sommers 65'; Lane 67', 73', 78' | Stadium: The Sir Tom Finney Stadium |

| 14 July 2026 Friendly | Fleetwood Town | 2–0 | Chester | Thornton-Cleveleys |
| 13:00 BST | Trialist A; Evans | Report | | Stadium: Poolfoot Farm; Attendance: 0 (BCD) |

| 18 July 2026 Friendly | Southport | 0–2 | Fleetwood Town | Blowick |
| 15:00 BST | | Report | Evans 13'; Coughlan 86' | Stadium: Haig Avenue |
Note: 2x60 minutes

| 21 July 2026 Friendly | Fleetwood Town | 2–1 | Huddersfield Town | Fleetwood |
| 19:30 BST | Coughlan 15' (pen.); Bennett 59' | Report | Mumba 28'; Bashir (penalty missed) 79' | Stadium: Highbury Stadium |

| 24 July 2026 Friendly | Fleetwood Town | Cancelled | Carlisle United | Thornton-Cleveleys |
| 13:00 BST | | | | Stadium: Poolfoot Farm; Attendance: 0 (BCD) |
Note: Fixture was cancelled due to unforeseen circumstances.

| 28 July 2026 Friendly | Fleetwood Town | 1–1 | Bolton Wanderers | Fleetwood |
| 19:00 BST | Evans 51' | Report | Gale 85' | Stadium: Highbury Stadium |

| 1 August 2026 Friendly | Hartlepool United | 1–0 | Fleetwood Town | Hartlepool |
| 15:00 BST | McKeown 89' | Report | | Stadium: Victoria Park |

== Competitions ==
=== League Two ===
==== League table ====
| Pos | Team | Pld | W | D | L | GF | GA | GD | Pts |
|---|---|---|---|---|---|---|---|---|---|
| 9 | Cheltenham Town | 15 | 6 | 3 | 6 | 23 | 26 | −3 | 21 |
| 10 | Shrewsbury Town | 15 | 6 | 3 | 6 | 19 | 23 | −4 | 21 |
| 11 | Fleetwood Town | 15 | 5 | 5 | 5 | 19 | 18 | +1 | 20 |
| 12 | Gillingham | 15 | 5 | 5 | 5 | 20 | 21 | −1 | 20 |
| 13 | Accrington Stanley | 15 | 4 | 7 | 4 | 25 | 21 | +4 | 19 |

Updated to match(es) played on 14 November 2026. Source: EFL Official Website
Rules for classification: 1) Points; 2) Goal difference; 3) Number of goals scored; 4) Head-to-head results; 5) Wins; 6) Away goals; 7) Penalty points (sec 9.5); 8) 12-point sending off offences

==== Results summary ====
| Overall | | | | | | | | Home | | | | | | Away | | | | | |
| Pld | W | D | L | GF | GA | GD | Pts | W | D | L | GF | GA | GD | W | D | L | GF | GA | GD |
|---|---|---|---|---|---|---|---|---|---|---|---|---|---|---|---|---|---|---|---|
| 15 | 5 | 5 | 5 | 19 | 18 | +1 | 20 | 4 | 3 | 1 | 11 | 5 | +6 | 1 | 2 | 4 | 8 | 13 | −5 |

Last updated: 14 November 2026.
Source: Soccerway

==== Matches ====
On 25 June, the League Two fixtures were revealed.

Win Draw Loss Fixtures

| 15 August 2026 1 | Chesterfield | 0–1 | Fleetwood Town | Whittington Moor |
| 15:00 BST | McFadzean (yellow card) 28' | Report | Evans (yellow card) 30', (goal) 35'; Cirino (yellow card) 45+3'; Neal (yellow card) 81' | Stadium: SMH Group Stadium; Attendance: 7,856; Referee: Alan Dale |

| 22 August 2026 2 | Fleetwood Town | 0–0 | Gillingham | Fleetwood |
| 15:00 BST | Bennett (yellow card) 30' | Report | Harris (yellow card) 41'; Brophy (yellow card) 58' | Stadium: Highbury Stadium; Attendance: 2,675 (336 Gills fans); Referee: Dale Baines |

| 29 August 2026 3 | Grimsby Town | 2–2 | Fleetwood Town | Cleethorpes |
| 15:00 BST | Rodgers (yellow card) 25'; Doyle 37'; Cook 64'; Kacurri (yellow card) 78' | Report | Davies 6', (yellow card) 57'; Cannon (yellow card) 28'; Potter (yellow card) 45+1', (goal) 69'; Bennett (yellow card) 61' | Stadium: Blundell Park; Attendance: 7,067; Referee: Rob Massey-Ellis |

| 1 September 2026 4 | Fleetwood Town | 1–1 | Oldham Athletic | Fleetwood |
| 19:45 BST | Neal (yellow card) 5'; Coughlan 88' | Report | Drummond 45' | Stadium: Highbury Stadium; Attendance: 3,085; Referee: William Davis |

| 5 September 2026 5 | Fleetwood Town | 2–0 | Shrewsbury Town | Fleetwood |
| 12:30 BST | Coughlan 39'; McCann (yellow card) 55'; Neal (yellow card) 63'; Loupalo-Bi 86'; Evans (yellow card) 90' | Report | Hoole (yellow card) 25'; Stubbs (yellow card) 32'; Berkoe (yellow card) 48'; Davison (yellow card) 66'; Gbodé (yellow card) 90' | Stadium: Highbury Stadium; Attendance: 2,698 (267 away); Referee: Edward Duckworth |
Note: Fixture was initially scheduled for a 15:00 kick-off, but was brought forward for live Sky Sports.

| 12 September 2026 6 | Newport County | 1–1 | Fleetwood Town | Newport |
| 15:00 BST | Doidge 38' | Report | Helm (yellow card) 30'; Potter (yellow card) 41'; Evans (yellow card) 45+1'; Rooney (yellow card) 54'; Loupalo-Bi 68'; Bennett (yellow card) 90+5' | Stadium: Rodney Parade; Attendance: 4,178; Referee: Sunny Singh Gill |

| 19 September 2026 7 | Barnet | 3–1 | Fleetwood Town | Edgware |
| 15:00 BST | Tshimanga 10' (pen.); Lakin 60'; Kanu 62', (yellow card) 75'; Gallagher (yellow card) 69'; Ofoborh (yellow card) 85' (yellow-red card) 85' | Report | Davies 36'; Rooney (yellow card) 43'; Evans (yellow card) 90+5' | Stadium: The Hive Stadium; Referee: Scott Jackson |

| 26 September 2026 8 | Fleetwood Town | 1–2 | Rochdale | Fleetwood |
| 15:00 BST | Helm 30'; Cirino (yellow card) 73' | Report | Brown 8'; Flint 14'; Adebayo-Rowling (yellow card) 39' (yellow-red card) 69' | Stadium: Highbury Stadium; Attendance: 3,726 (1,117 away); Referee: Alex Chilowicz |

| 3 October 2026 9 | Salford City | 1–0 | Fleetwood Town | Kersal |
| 15:00 BST | Wiredu (yellow card) 4'; Langstaff 65' | Report | Coughlan (yellow card) 84' | Stadium: AIG Stadium; Referee: Ross Martin |

| 10 October 2026 10 | Fleetwood Town | 1–1 | Walsall | Fleetwood |
| 15:00 BST | Bennett (yellow card) 54'; Coughlan 61'; Neal (yellow card) 74'; McCann (yellow card) 76'; Helm (yellow card) 80' | | Sprangler (yellow card) 48'; Smith (yellow card) 76'; Pressley 82'; Moore (yellow card) 90+1' | Stadium: Highbury Stadium; Attendance: 3,212; Referee: Jamie Robinson |

| 17 October 2026 11 | Fleetwood Town | 2–0 | Rotherham United | Fleetwood |
| 12:30 BST | Rooney 46'; Helm (yellow card) 65'; Coughlan (yellow card) 66', (goal) 80'; Lynch (yellow card) 89'; McCann (yellow card) 90+1' | Report | Cover (yellow card) 38'; Douglas (yellow card) 62'; Lolos (yellow card) 89'; Iorfa (yellow card) 90+1' | Stadium: Highbury Stadium; Referee: Steven Copeland |
Note: Fixture was initially scheduled for a 15:00 kick-off, but was brought forward for live Sky Sports broadcasting.

| 20 October 2026 12 | Cheltenham Town | 4–2 | Fleetwood Town | Cheltenham |
| 19:45 BST | Lynch 17' (o.g.); Stevenson (yellow card) 20'; Otchere 25'; J. Evans 39'; Tomkinson (yellow card) 64'; Willcox 80' | Report | Murphy (yellow card) 11'; Rooney (yellow card) 31'; C. Evans 50', 65' (pen.); Bennett (yellow card) 89' | Stadium: EV Charger Points Stadium; Attendance: 2,923; Referee: Oliver Mackey |

| 24 October 2026 13 | Exeter City | 2–1 | Fleetwood Town | Exeter |
| 15:00 BST | Perry (yellow card) 35'; Cummins 58'; Fitzwater (yellow card) 60'; Woodhouse 64' | Report | Coughlan 61' | Stadium: St James Park; Attendance: 5,515; Referee: George Laflin |

| 31 October 2026 14 | Fleetwood Town | 3–1 | Bristol Rovers | Fleetwood |
| 15:00 GMT | Bennett (yellow card) 10', (goal) 59'; Loupalo-Bi 37'; McCann (yellow card) 82'; Robertson 90' | Report | Russell-Denny 84' | Stadium: Highbury Stadium; Attendance: 2,822; Referee: Richard Eley |

| 14 November 2026 15 | Fleetwood Town | 1–0 | Tranmere Rovers | Fleetwood |
| 17:30 GMT | Potter (yellow card) 42'; Rooney 82' | Report | Nevett (yellow card) 45+1' | Stadium: Highbury Stadium; Attendance: 3,459; Referee: Paul Howard |
Note: Fixture was initially scheduled for a 15:00 kick-off, but was pushed back for live Sky Sports broadcasting.

| 21 November 2026 16 | Crawley Town | v | Fleetwood Town | Crawley |
| 15:00 GMT | | | | Stadium: Broadfield Stadium |

| 28 November 2026 17 | Fleetwood Town | v | Accrington Stanley | Fleetwood |
| 15:00 GMT | | | | Stadium: Highbury Stadium |

| 1 December 2026 18 | Northampton Town | v | Fleetwood Town | Sixfields |
| 19:45 GMT | | | | Stadium: Sixfields Stadium |

| 12 December 2026 19 | Fleetwood Town | v | Swindon Town | Fleetwood |
| 15:00 GMT | | | | Stadium: Highbury Stadium |

| 20 December 2026 20 | Colchester United | v | Fleetwood Town | Colchester |
| 13:00 GMT | | | | Stadium: JobServe Community Stadium |
Note: Fixture was initially scheduled for a 15:00 kick-off, but was brought forward for live Sky Sports broadcasting. It was then later pushed back a day due to EFL Cup involvements on the preceding Thursday.

=== FA Cup ===
Fleetwood were drawn at home to Rochdale in the first round.

Win Draw Loss Fixtures

| 7 November 2026 First round | Fleetwood Town | 1–2 (a.e.t.) | Rochdale | Fleetwood |
| 15:00 GMT | Batty (yellow card) 9'; Coughlan 74' (pen.); Neal (yellow card) 116' | Report | Hannant 23'; Gilmour (yellow card) 34'; Adeeko 111'; Hayes (yellow card) 113' | Stadium: Highbury Stadium; Attendance: 2,026; Referee: William Davis |

=== EFL Cup ===
Fleetwood were drawn at home to Chesterfield in the first round, Shrewsbury Town in the second round, Sheffield United in the third round, Arsenal in the fourth round and Everton in the quarter-finals.

Win Draw Loss Fixtures

| 8 August 2026 First round | Fleetwood Town | 1–0 | Chesterfield | Fleetwood |
| 15:00 BST | Evans 14'; Thompson-Sommers (yellow card) 61'; McCann (yellow card) 86'; Potter (yellow card) 90' | Report | Koroma (yellow card) 65'; McFadzean (yellow card) 89' | Stadium: Highbury Stadium; Attendance: 1,619; Referee: Martin Coy |

| 25 August 2026 Second round | Fleetwood Town | 4–0 | Shrewsbury Town | Fleetwood |
| 19:45 BST | Boyle 8' (o.g.); Evans 28', 35'; Davies 90' | Report | | Stadium: Highbury Stadium; Attendance: 1,066; Referee: Thomas Parsons |

| 16 September 2026 Third round | Fleetwood Town | 1–0 | Sheffield United | Fleetwood |
| 19:45 BST | McCann (yellow card) 23'; Evans (yellow card) 53'; Norrington-Davies 57' (o.g.) | Report | Norrington-Davies (yellow card) 90+1' | Stadium: Highbury Stadium; Attendance: 2,348; Referee: Ben Speedie |

| 27 October 2026 Fourth round | Fleetwood Town | 1–1 (4–3 p) | Arsenal | Fleetwood |
| 20:00 GMT | Loupalo-Bi 21'; McLean (yellow card) 54'; Batty (yellow card) 74'; Cannon (yellow card) 86' | Report | Gyökeres 50'; Dowman (red card) 85' | Stadium: Highbury Stadium; Attendance: 5,002 (841 away); Referee: Michael Salisbury |
| | Penalties |
| | Coughlan (penalty scored); Neal (penalty scored); Davies (penalty scored); Cannon (penalty scored); Haughey (penalty scored) | | (penalty scored) Ødegaard; (penalty scored) Havertz; (penalty scored) Gyökeres; (penalty missed) Guimarães |

| 17 December 2026 Quarter-finals | Fleetwood Town | v | Everton | Fleetwood |
| 20:00 GMT | | Report | | Stadium: Highbury Stadium |

=== EFL Trophy ===
==== Group stage ====
Fleetwood were drawn against Oldham Athletic, Barnsley and Leeds United U21 into Northern Group G.

| Pos | Div | Team | Pld | W | PW | PL | L | GF | GA | GD | Pts | Qualification |
|---|---|---|---|---|---|---|---|---|---|---|---|---|
| 1 | L2 | Oldham Athletic (A) | 3 | 2 | 0 | 0 | 1 | 7 | 7 | 0 | 6 | Advance to Round 2 |
| 2 | L2 | Fleetwood Town | 2 | 1 | 0 | 0 | 1 | 4 | 2 | +2 | 3 | Advance to Round 2 |
| 3 | L1 | Barnsley (E) | 3 | 1 | 0 | 0 | 2 | 9 | 10 | −1 | 3 | |
| 4 | ACA | Leeds United U21 | 2 | 1 | 0 | 0 | 1 | 6 | 7 | −1 | 3 | |

Updated to match(es) played on 11 November 2026. Source: EFL
(A) Advances to a further round; (E) Eliminated

| 22 September 2026 Group stage | Oldham Athletic | 1–0 | Fleetwood Town | Oldham |
| 19:00 BST | Chilvers 46'; Kavanagh (yellow card) 90+4' | Report | Rooney (yellow card) 55'; Cirino (yellow card) 85' | Stadium: Boundary Park; Attendance: 851 (91 away); Referee: Michael Barlow |

| 6 October 2026 Group stage | Fleetwood Town | 4–1 | Barnsley | Fleetwood |
| 19:00 BST | Cirino (yellow card) 13'; Lane (yellow card) 40'; Coughlan 59' (pen.); Davies 62'; Loupalo-Bi 67'; Robertson (yellow card) 72'; Sawkins 87' | Report | Brownlie 81' | Stadium: Highbury Stadium; Attendance: 487; Referee: Andrew Miller |

| 24 November 2026 Group stage | Fleetwood Town | v | Leeds United U21 | Fleetwood |
| 19:00 GMT | | | | Stadium: Highbury Stadium |

== Statistics ==
=== Appearances and goals ===
As of match played 14 November 2026

Players with no appearances are not included on the list; italics indicated loaned in player

| No. | Pos | Nat | Player | Total | | League Two | | FA Cup | | EFL Cup | | EFL Trophy | |
| No. | Pos | Nat | Player | Apps | Goals | Apps | Goals | Apps | Goals | Apps | Goals | Apps | Goals |
|---|---|---|---|---|---|---|---|---|---|---|---|---|---|
| 1 | GK | (England) ENG | Jay Lynch | 20 | 0 | 15+0 | 0 | 1+0 | 0 | 4+0 | 0 | 0+0 | 0 |
| 3 | DF | (England) ENG | Danny Andrew | 12 | 0 | 3+5 | 0 | 0+1 | 0 | 2+1 | 0 | 0+0 | 0 |
| 4 | MF | (England) ENG | Harrison Neal | 20 | 0 | 15+0 | 0 | 1+0 | 0 | 4+0 | 0 | 0+0 | 0 |
| 5 | DF | (England) ENG | Finley Potter | 22 | 1 | 15+0 | 1 | 1+0 | 0 | 4+0 | 0 | 2+0 | 0 |
| 6 | DF | (England) ENG | Rhys Bennett | 20 | 1 | 13+0 | 1 | 1+0 | 0 | 4+0 | 0 | 0+2 | 0 |
| 7 | MF | (England) ENG | Andy Cannon | 8 | 0 | 2+3 | 0 | 1+0 | 0 | 0+2 | 0 | 0+0 | 0 |
| 8 | MF | (England) ENG | Kane Thompson-Sommers | 2 | 0 | 1+0 | 0 | 0+0 | 0 | 1+0 | 0 | 0+0 | 0 |
| 9 | FW | (England) ENG | Will Davies | 20 | 4 | 7+6 | 2 | 0+1 | 0 | 1+3 | 1 | 1+1 | 1 |
| 10 | MF | (England) ENG | Mark Helm | 20 | 1 | 15+0 | 1 | 0+1 | 0 | 4+0 | 0 | 0+0 | 0 |
| 11 | FW | (Wales) WAL | Josh Thomas | 2 | 0 | 0+1 | 0 | 0+1 | 0 | 0+0 | 0 | 0+0 | 0 |
| 14 | FW | (Northern Ireland) NIR | Lewis McCann | 19 | 0 | 14+0 | 0 | 1+0 | 0 | 3+0 | 0 | 0+1 | 0 |
| 15 | MF | (Republic of Ireland) IRL | Adam Murphy | 15 | 0 | 9+2 | 0 | 0+0 | 0 | 0+3 | 0 | 1+0 | 0 |
| 16 | DF | (Northern Ireland) NIR | Conor Haughey | 10 | 0 | 2+5 | 0 | 1+0 | 0 | 1+1 | 0 | 0+0 | 0 |
| 17 | FW | (Wales) WAL | Ched Evans | 18 | 6 | 10+4 | 3 | 0+0 | 0 | 4+0 | 3 | 0+0 | 0 |
| 19 | FW | (Republic of Ireland) IRL | Ronan Coughlan | 19 | 7 | 9+4 | 5 | 1+0 | 1 | 0+3 | 0 | 2+0 | 1 |
| 20 | FW | (England) ENG | Aaron Loupalo-Bi | 19 | 5 | 4+9 | 3 | 1+0 | 0 | 3+0 | 1 | 1+1 | 1 |
| 22 | GK | (Wales) WAL | James Pradic | 2 | 0 | 0+0 | 0 | 0+0 | 0 | 0+0 | 0 | 2+0 | 0 |
| 23 | DF | (England) ENG | Liam Roberts | 1 | 0 | 0+0 | 0 | 0+0 | 0 | 0+0 | 0 | 0+1 | 0 |
| 24 | DF | (England) ENG | Jake Batty | 11 | 0 | 7+1 | 0 | 1+0 | 0 | 1+0 | 0 | 0+1 | 0 |
| 26 | DF | (Scotland) SCO | Shaun Rooney | 22 | 2 | 15+0 | 2 | 0+1 | 0 | 4+0 | 0 | 2+0 | 0 |
| 27 | MF | (England) ENG | Crispin McLean | 13 | 0 | 3+5 | 0 | 1+0 | 0 | 3+1 | 0 | 0+0 | 0 |
| 28 | MF | (England) ENG | Josh Robertson | 8 | 1 | 0+5 | 1 | 0+1 | 0 | 0+0 | 0 | 2+0 | 0 |
| 29 | DF | (Montserrat) MSR | Raff Cirino | 14 | 0 | 5+5 | 0 | 0+0 | 0 | 1+1 | 0 | 2+0 | 0 |
| 30 | FW | (England) ENG | Mikey Lane | 1 | 0 | 0+0 | 0 | 0+0 | 0 | 0+0 | 0 | 1+0 | 0 |
| 32 | DF | (England) ENG | Kayden Hughes | 3 | 0 | 1+0 | 0 | 0+0 | 0 | 0+0 | 0 | 2+0 | 0 |
| 35 | MF | (Republic of Ireland) IRL | Sean Costelloe | 2 | 0 | 0+0 | 0 | 0+0 | 0 | 0+0 | 0 | 2+0 | 0 |
| 36 | DF | (Republic of Ireland) IRL | Jesse Dempsey | 2 | 0 | 0+0 | 0 | 0+0 | 0 | 0+0 | 0 | 2+0 | 0 |
| 39 | MF | (Republic of Ireland) IRL | Muhammad Oladiti | 1 | 0 | 0+0 | 0 | 0+0 | 0 | 0+0 | 0 | 0+1 | 0 |
| 41 | MF | (England) ENG | Mathis Bamba | 1 | 0 | 0+0 | 0 | 0+0 | 0 | 0+0 | 0 | 0+1 | 0 |
| 43 | FW | (England) ENG | Noah Sawkins | 1 | 1 | 0+0 | 0 | 0+0 | 0 | 0+0 | 0 | 0+1 | 1 |

== Awards ==
=== Player Awards ===
==== EFL League Two Goal of the Month ====
| Month | Player | Opposition | Result | Ref. |
|---|---|---|---|---|
| August | (Wales) Ched Evans | v. Chesterfield | Won | |
