= Reece Wilkes =

English footballer (born 200?)

Personal information
- Full name: Reece Ashton Wilkes
- Date of birth: 9 February 2009 (age 17)
- Place of birth: Lancashire, England
- Height: 1.83 m (6 ft 0 in)
- Position: Attacking midfielder

Team information
- Current team: Norwich City

Youth career
- 2016–2025: Fleetwood Town
- 2025–: Norwich City

Senior career*
Years	Team	Apps	(Gls)
2024–2025	Fleetwood Town	0	(0)

International career
2024	England U15	4	(0)
2024	England U16	2	(0)
- * Club domestic league appearances and goals as of 23:16, 14 October 2024 (UTC)

Reece Ashton Wilkes is an English footballer who plays as a midfielder for EFL Championship club Norwich City.

== Career ==
Wilkes joined the Fleetwood Town Academy at the age of seven, playing in the clubs first ever under-8's pre-Academy Group. He became one of Fleetwood's youngest ever first team players when he made his debut on 3 September 2024 aged 15 in the 3–2 EFL Trophy defeat to Aston Villa U21, replacing fellow debutant Pele Smith as a late substitute.

On 3 July 2025, it was announced that Wilked had moved to EFL Championship side Norwich City for an undisclosed fee and would commence a two-year scholarship at the club.

== Career statistics ==
As of match played 3 September 2024

Appearances and goals by club, season and competition
Club	Season	League			FA Cup		EFL Cup		Other		Total	
Club	Season	Division	Apps	Goals	Apps	Goals	Apps	Goals	Apps	Goals	Apps	Goals
Fleetwood Town	2024–25	League Two	0	0	0	0	0	0	1 (Note: Appearance(s) in EFL Trophy)	0	1	0
Career total			1	0	0	0	0	0	1	0	1	0
