= Rhys Bennett =

Rhys Bennett is the name of:

- Rhys Bennett (footballer, born 1991), English footballer (born 1991)
- Rhys Bennett (footballer, born 2003), English footballer (born 2003)
