= 2024–25 Fleetwood Town F.C. season =

117th season in existence of Fleetwood Town FC

Fleetwood Town
2024–25 season
- Chairman: Jamie Pilley
- Head Coach: Charlie Adam (until 22 December); Pete Wild (from 24 December)
- Stadium: Highbury Stadium
- League Two: 14th
- FA Cup: First round (eliminated by Reading)
- EFL Cup: Third round (eliminated by Stoke City)
- EFL Trophy: Group stage
- Top goalscorer: League: Matty Virtue; Ronan Coughlan (8 each); All: Ronan Coughlan (10 goals)
- Highest home attendance: 4,025 23 September 2024 vs. Morecambe
- Lowest home attendance: 726 3 September 2024 vs. Aston Villa U21
Home colours	Away colours	Third colours

The 2024–25 season was the 117th season in the history of Fleetwood Town Football Club and their first season back in League Two since the 2013–14 season, following their relegation from League One in the previous season. In addition to the domestic league, the club would also participate in the FA Cup, the EFL Cup, and the EFL Trophy.

== Transfers ==
=== In ===
Date	Pos.	Player	From	Fee	Ref.
28 June 2024	CM	Elliot Bonds (GUY)	Cheltenham Town (ENG)	Undisclosed	
1 July 2024 (Note: The transfer was announced on 31 May, and would become official on July 1 once his Blackpool contract expired)	CM	Matty Virtue (ENG)	Blackpool (ENG)	Free	
2 July 2024	CB	Zech Medley (ENG)	KV Oostende (BEL)	Free	
4 July 2024	RB	James Bolton (ENG)	St Mirren (SCO)	Undisclosed	
4 July 2024	LB	MacKenzie Hunt (ENG)	Everton (ENG)	Free	
9 July 2024	GK	Luke Hewitson (ENG) (Note: Signed initially for the Under-21s)	Liverpool (ENG)	Free	
9 July 2024	CM	Toby Oliver (ENG)	Blackpool (ENG)	Free	
11 July 2024	RW	Dannen Francis (ATG)	Blackpool (ENG)	Free	
25 July 2024	CM	Mark Helm (ENG)	Burton Albion (ENG)	Undisclosed	
12 August 2024	CF	Mipo Odubeko (IRL)	Maritimo (POR)	Free	
15 August 2024	CM	Zack Littler (ENG)	Blackpool (ENG)	Free	
1 October 2024	DM	Liam Shaw (ENG)	Celtic (SCO)	Free	
4 January 2025	RB	Shaun Rooney (SCO)	St Mirren (SCO)	Free	
16 January 2025	CM	Harrison Neal (ENG)	Carlisle United (ENG)	Undisclosed	

=== Out ===
Date	Pos.	Player	To	Fee	Ref.
21 June 2024	CF	Jayden Stockley (ENG)	Port Vale (ENG)	Undisclosed	
3 July 2024	RW	Cian Hayes (IRL)	Peterborough United (ENG)	Undisclosed	
3 July 2024	CM	Kyle White (ENG)	Waterford (IRL)	Free	
18 July 2024	CM	Harvey Macadam (ENG)	Morecambe (ENG)	Undisclosed	
19 July 2024	RW	Promise Omochere (IRL)	Bristol Rovers (ENG)	Undisclosed	
24 July 2024	AM	Pharrell Brown (ENG)	Hull City (ENG)	Undisclosed	
25 July 2024	AM	Junior Quitirna (GNB)	Crawley Town (ENG)	Undisclosed	
30 August 2024	RW	Maleace Asamoah (ENG)	Wigan Athletic (ENG)	Undisclosed	
1 January 2025 (Note: The transfer was announced on 3 December, and would become official on January 1 once the transfer window reopened)	CM	Barry Baggley (NIR)	St Patrick's Athletic (IRL)	Undisclosed	
1 January 2025 (Note: The transfer was announced on 26 November, and would become official on January 1 once the transfer window reopened)	CF	Sam Glenfield (NIR)	Waterford (IRL)	Free	
3 January 2025	DM	Liam Shaw (ENG)	Northampton Town (ENG)	Undisclosed	
4 January 2025	RB	Carl Johnston (NIR)	Peterborough United (ENG)	Undisclosed	
11 March 2025	CF	Kian Harratt (ENG)	Oldham Athletic (ENG)	Undisclosed	

=== Loaned in ===
Date	Pos.	Player	From	Date until	Ref.
29 August 2024	CB	Rhys Bennett (ENG)	Manchester United (ENG)	End of season	
30 August 2024	CF	Kian Harratt (ENG)	Huddersfield Town (ENG)	7 January 2025 (Note: On 7 January, Harratt's loan from Huddersfield was made permanently.)	
31 January 2025	DM	Brandon Cover (JAM)	Leicester City (ENG)	End of season	
31 January 2025	CF	Kobei Moore (ENG)	Aston Villa (ENG)	End of season	
3 February 2025	SS	Louie Marsh (ENG)	Sheffield United (ENG)	End of season	

=== Loaned out ===
Date	Pos.	Player	To	Date until	Ref.
8 July 2024	RM	Barry Baggley (NIR)	Waterford (IRL)	30 November 2024	
8 July 2024	GK	Stephen McMullan (NIR)	Caernarfon Town (WAL)	1 January 2025	
5 August 2024	RM	George Morrison (SCO)	Tamworth (ENG)	End of season	
23 August 2024	AM	Callum Dolan (ENG)	Oldham Athletic (ENG)	1 January 2025	
9 November 2024	GK	Tom Donaghy (ENG)	Hereford (ENG)	8 December 2024	
6 January 2025	CF	Tommy Lonergan (IRL)	Waterford (IRL)	30 November 2025	
7 January 2025	GK	Stephen McMullan (NIR)	Waterford (IRL)	30 November 2025	
8 January 2025	GK	Tom Donaghy (ENG)	Boston United (ENG)	5 February 2025	

=== Released / Out of Contract ===
Date	Pos.	Player	Subsequent club	Join date	Ref.
30 June 2024	LB	Finlay Armstrong (ENG)	Rochdale (ENG)	1 July 2024	
30 June 2024	GK	Patrick Boyes (ENG)	King's Lynn Town (ENG)	1 July 2024	
30 June 2024	CM	Theo Butterworth (ENG)	HCU Huskies (USA)	1 July 2024	
30 June 2024	LB	Josh Edwards (ENG)	Stockport Town (ENG)	1 July 2024	
30 June 2024	CF	Sam Fishburn (ENG)	Scunthorpe United (ENG)	1 July 2024	
30 June 2024	RB	Shaun Rooney (SCO)	St Mirren (SCO)	1 July 2024	
30 June 2024	CB	Ben Heneghan (ENG)	Port Vale (ENG)	24 July 2024	
30 June 2024	AM	Bosembo Namputu (ENG)	Biggleswade Town (ENG)	6 September 2024	
30 June 2024	CB	Connor Teale (ENG)	Altrincham (ENG)	4 October 2024	
30 June 2024	CM	Harry Wilson (NIR)	Cliftonville (NIR)	6 November 2024	
30 June 2024	CM	Dominic Richmond (MSR)			
30 June 2024	GK	Reuben Woodward (ENG)			
11 December 2024	CF	Mipo Odubeko (IRL)	Shelbourne (IRL)	20 December 2024	

== Pre-season and friendlies ==
On 9 May, Fleetwood announced their first pre-season friendly would be against Bamber Bridge. A second friendly was later added to the schedule, in Heart of Midlothian. On 7 June, a behind closed doors friendly versus Rochdale was also added. Five days later, a trip to Scotland to face St Mirren during pre-season was confirmed. On 8 July, a final pre-season fixture was announced, against Wrexham.

Win Draw Loss Fixtures

6 July 2024 Friendly	Bamber Bridge	0–2	Fleetwood Town	Bamber Bridge
13:00 BST		Report	Hughes 47'; Dolan 90'	Stadium: Sir Tom Finney Stadium
Note: The fixture was initially scheduled for a 15:00 kick-off, but was changed due to England's potential UEFA Euro 2024 progression.

13 July 2024 Friendly	St Mirren	2–2	Fleetwood Town	Paisley, Scotland
15:00 BST	Smyth 63'; Jamieson 87'	Report	Coughlan 9'; Quitirna 68'	Stadium: St Mirren Park

20 July 2024 Friendly	Fleetwood Town	1–1	Rochdale	Thornton-Cleveleys
15:00 BST	Graydon	Report	Rodney	Stadium: Poolfoot Farm; Attendance: 0 (behind closed doors)

27 July 2024 Friendly	Fleetwood Town	3–0	Heart of Midlothian	Fleetwood
15:00 BST	Mayor 28', 60'; Coughlan 31'	Report		Stadium: Highbury Stadium

3 August 2024 Friendly	Wrexham	1–0	Fleetwood Town	Wrexham
15:00 BST	Cleworth 70'	Report		Stadium: Racecourse Ground

== Competitions ==
=== League Two ===
==== League table ====
Pos	Team	Pld	W	D	L	GF	GA	GD	Pts
12	Swindon Town	46	15	17	14	71	63	+8	62
13	Crewe Alexandra	46	15	17	14	49	48	+1	62
14	Fleetwood Town	46	15	15	16	60	60	0	60
15	Cheltenham Town	46	16	12	18	60	70	−10	60
16	Barrow	46	15	14	17	52	50	+2	59

Source: EFL Official Website
Rules for classification: 1) Points; 2) Goal difference; 3) Number of goals scored; 4) Head-to-head results; 5) Wins; 6) Away goals; 7) Penalty points (sec 9.5); 8) 12-point sending off offences

==== Results summary ====
Overall								Home						Away					
Pld	W	D	L	GF	GA	GD	Pts	W	D	L	GF	GA	GD	W	D	L	GF	GA	GD
46	15	15	16	60	60	0	60	7	12	4	24	21	+3	8	3	12	36	39	−3

Source: Soccerway

==== Matches ====
On 26 June, the League Two fixtures were announced.

Win Draw Loss Fixtures

10 August 2024 1	Fleetwood Town	1–0	Grimsby Town	Fleetwood
15:00 BST	Helm 18'	Report	Rodgers (yellow card) 27'; Davies (yellow card) 69'; Khouri (yellow card) 90+3'	Stadium: Highbury Stadium; Attendance: 3,525; Referee: Ben Speedie

18 August 2024 2	Notts County	2–2	Fleetwood Town	Nottingham
13:00 BST	Platt (yellow card) 23'; Jatta 57'; McGoldrick (yellow card) 90'; Jones 90+5' (pen.)	Report	Graydon 30' (yellow card) 75'; Sarpong-Wiredu 46'; Bonds (yellow card) 55'; Helm (yellow card) 61'; Odubeko (yellow card) 81'	Stadium: Meadow Lane; Attendance: 10,057; Referee: Thomas Parsons
Note: Fixture was initially scheduled for 17 August, but was moved due to a clash of home fixtures with Nottingham Forest.

24 August 2024 3	Fleetwood Town	0–0	Gillingham	Fleetwood
15:00 BST	Helm (yellow card) 11'; Wiredu (yellow card) 27'; Holgate (yellow card) 80'	Report	Dieng (yellow card) 11'; Little (yellow card) 29'; Ehmer (yellow card) 38'; Rowe (yellow card) 90+1'	Stadium: Highbury Stadium; Attendance: 3,157; Referee: Scott Jackson

31 August 2024 4	AFC Wimbledon	1–0	Fleetwood Town	Wimbledon
15:00 BST	Neufville 28'; Harbottle (yellow card) 46'; Lewis (yellow card) 48'; Bugiel (yellow card) 90+1'	Report	Broom (yellow card) 70'; Hunt (yellow card) 73'	Stadium: Plough Lane; Attendance: 7,162; Referee: James Durkin

14 September 2024 6	Carlisle United	2–3	Fleetwood Town	Carlisle
15:00 BST	Hayden (yellow card) 20'; Wyke 42' (pen.), 52'; Biggins (yellow card) 78'; Davies (yellow card) 79'; Jones (yellow card) 83'	Report	Mayor 10', 68'; Coughlan 19', (yellow card) 77'; Helm (yellow card) 21'; Virtue (yellow card) 58'; Johnston (yellow card) 87'	Stadium: Brunton Park; Attendance: 7,090; Referee: Scott Tallis

23 September 2024 7	Fleetwood Town	2–2	Morecambe	Fleetwood
20:00 BST	Graydon 34', (yellow card) 90+6'; Helm (yellow card) 42'; Coughlan 45+3'; Bonds (yellow card) 45+5'; Bolton (yellow card) 71'; Johnston (yellow card) 81'; Hunt (yellow card) 84'	Report	Songo'o (yellow card) 38', (goal) 74'; Angol (yellow card) 40'; Tollitt (yellow card) 63'; Hope 86'; Harrack (yellow card) 89'	Stadium: Highbury Stadium; Attendance: 4,025; Referee: Matthew Corlett
Note: Fixture was initially scheduled for 21 September, but was moved for live Sky Sports broadcast.

28 September 2024 8	Cheltenham Town	0–2	Fleetwood Town	Cheltenham
15:00 BST	Bennett (yellow card) 28'; Payne (yellow card) 50'	Report	Virtue 5', 51', (yellow card) 58'; Mayor (yellow card) 31'; Bonds (yellow card) 36'	Stadium: Whaddon Road; Attendance: 3,928; Referee: Carl Brook

1 October 2024 9	Walsall	2–6	Fleetwood Town	Bescot
19:45 GMT	Williams 14'; Matt 45'	Report	Coughlan 25', 51' (pen.); Bennett (yellow card) 45+2'; Hughes 57', 67'; Virtue 85'; Helm 90+4'; Harrington (yellow card) 90+6'	Stadium: Bescot Stadium; Attendance: 4,237; Referee: Dale Baines

5 October 2024 10	Fleetwood Town	0–0	Bromley	Fleetwood
12:30 BST		Report	Sowunmi (yellow card) 59'	Stadium: Highbury Stadium; Attendance: 2,605; Referee: Martin Coy
Note: Fixture was initially scheduled for a 15:00 kick-off, but was moved for live Sky Sports broadcast.

19 October 2024 12	Port Vale	3–1	Fleetwood Town	Burslem
15:00 GMT	Richards 33'; Croasdale 67'; Curtis 73'	Report	Bonds (yellow card) 8'; Johnston 36'; Hughes (yellow card) 45'; Sarpong-Wiredu (yellow card) 48'; Graydon (yellow card) 62'	Stadium: Vale Park; Attendance: 6,643; Referee: John Mulligan

22 October 2024 13	Fleetwood Town	0–1	Crewe Alexandra	Fleetwood
19:45 GMT		Report	Tabiner (yellow card) 17'; Conway (yellow card) 59'; Cooney 87' (pen.)	Stadium: Highbury Stadium; Attendance: 2,725; Referee: Seb Stockbridge

26 October 2024 14	Newport County	0–0	Fleetwood Town	Newport
15:00 GMT	Morris (penalty missed) 25'; Miley (yellow card) 45+4'	Report	Harrington (yellow card) 24'; Virtue (yellow card) 36'; Mayor (yellow card) 74'	Stadium: Rodney Parade; Attendance: 4,244; Referee: David Rock

29 October 2024 5	Fleetwood Town	2–2	Salford City	Fleetwood
19:45 GMT	Potter (yellow card) 30'; Coughlan 33'; Bonds (yellow card) 59'; Helm 61'; Virtue (yellow card) 90'	Report	Negru (yellow card) 5'; Woodburn 18', (yellow card) 68'; Kouassi (yellow card) 26'; Taylor (yellow card) 28'; N'Mai (yellow card) 55'; Tilt (yellow card) 90+4'; Okoronkwo 90+8'	Stadium: Highbury Stadium; Attendance: 2,549; Referee: Michael Salisbury
Note: Fixture was originally scheduled for 7 September, but was postponed due to international call-ups.

9 November 2024 15	Fleetwood Town	1–0	Bradford City	Fleetwood
15:00 GMT	Coughlan 8' (pen.); Shaw (yellow card) 36'	Report	Benn (yellow card) 85'	Stadium: Highbury Stadium; Attendance: 3,971; Referee: Martin Woods

30 November 2024 11	Fleetwood Town	0–0	Colchester United	Fleetwood
15:00 GMT	Mayor (yellow card) 61'; Shaw (yellow card) 69'	Report	Macey (yellow card) 71'	Stadium: Highbury Stadium; Attendance: 3,202; Referee: Darren Drysdale
Note: Fixture was originally scheduled for 12 October, but was postponed due to international call-ups.

4 December 2024 18	Fleetwood Town	2–4	Doncaster Rovers	Fleetwood
19:45 GMT	Bolton (yellow card) 19'; Helm 34'; Graydon 42'	Report	Anderson (yellow card) 9'; Hurst 13'; Bailey 49'; Sharp 45+3'; Sterry (yellow card) 54'; Bolton 68' (o.g.); Sharman-Lowe (yellow card) 90+3'	Stadium: Highbury Stadium; Attendance: 2,205; Referee: Adam Herczeg

7 December 2024 19	Swindon Town	3–1	Fleetwood Town	Swindon
15:00 GMT	Smith 8', 28', 58'; Clarke (yellow card) 39'; Glatzel (penalty missed) 61'	Report	Mayor (yellow card) 33'; Broom (yellow card) 44'; Virtue 67'	Stadium: County Ground; Attendance: 5,819; Referee: Ben Atkinson

16 December 2024 20	Fleetwood Town	1–1	Accrington Stanley	Fleetwood
20:00 GMT	Bolton (yellow card) 11'; Bennett (yellow card) 45+1'; Broom 52'; Patterson (yellow card) 70'	Report	Aljofree 32', (yellow card) 35'; Walton (yellow card) 87'; Awe (yellow card) 90+2'	Stadium: Highbury Stadium; Attendance: 2,669; Referee: Thomas Kirk
Note: Fixture was initially scheduled for 14 December, but was moved for live Sky Sports broadcast.

21 December 2024 21	Barrow	2–0	Fleetwood Town	Barrow-in-Furness
12:30 GMT	Acquah 4'; Vassell 10'; Spence (yellow card) 40'	Report	Bennett (yellow card) 82'	Stadium: Holker Street; Attendance: 3,007; Referee: Martin Coy
Note: Fixture was initially scheduled for a 15:00 kick-off, but was moved for live Sky Sports broadcast.

26 December 2024 22	Fleetwood Town	2–0	Chesterfield	Fleetwood
15:00 GMT	Virtue 28'; Bonds (yellow card) 38'; Sarpong-Wiredu (yellow card) 48'; Potter (yellow card) 72'; Harratt 87'	Report	Drummond (yellow card) 61'; Araujo (yellow card) 80'	Stadium: Highbury Stadium; Attendance: 3,469; Referee: Ben Speedie

29 December 2024 23	Fleetwood Town	1–1	Harrogate Town	Fleetwood
15:00 GMT	Bolton 2'; Sarpong-Wiredu (yellow card) 25'; Potter (yellow card) 77'; Patterson (penalty missed) 90+1'; Mayor (yellow card) 90+3'	Report	March 8'; Cornelius (yellow card) 65'	Stadium: Highbury Stadium; Attendance: 2,468; Referee: Simon Mather

1 January 2025 24	Doncaster Rovers	2–1	Fleetwood Town	Doncaster
15:00 GMT	Bailey 44'; Sharp 90+2'	Report	Virtue 62'	Stadium: Eco-Power Stadium; Attendance: 7,290; Referee: Declan Bourne

18 January 2025 27	Salford City	0–2	Fleetwood Town	Kersal
15:00 GMT	Lund (yellow card) 18'; Fornah (yellow card) 45+1'; Kouassi (yellow card) 62' (yellow-red card) 85'	Report	Coughlan 2'; Sarpong-Wiredu 11'; Bennett (yellow card) 85'	Stadium: Moor Lane; Attendance: 3,216; Referee: David Rock

21 January 2025 17	Fleetwood Town	2–1	Milton Keynes Dons	Fleetwood
19:45 GMT	Bonds (yellow card) 14'; Broom 33'; Coughlan (yellow card) 42'; Sarpong-Wiredu (yellow card) 45+2'; Rooney 68', (yellow card) 83'	Report	White (yellow card) 14'; O'Reilly 81'; Hendry (yellow card) 90+6'	Stadium: Highbury Stadium; Attendance: W Referee: Thomas Parsons
Note: Fixture was originally scheduled for 23 November, but was postponed due to a waterlogged pitch.

25 January 2025 28	Fleetwood Town	1–2	Carlisle United	Fleetwood
15:00 GMT	Sarpong-Wiredu (yellow card) 18'; Potter (yellow card) 44'; Bennett (yellow card) 56'; Coughlan 70'; Rooney (yellow card) 90+2'	Report	Scott 19'; Patching (yellow card) 23'; Embleton (yellow card) 70'; Lavelle 85'; Hugill (yellow card) 88'; Breeze (yellow card) 90+2'	Stadium: Highbury Stadium; Attendance: 3,517; Referee: Matthew Corlett

28 January 2025 29	Fleetwood Town	2–0	Walsall	Fleetwood
19:45 GMT	Rooney 12'; Bolton 17'	Report		Stadium: Highbury Stadium; Attendance: 2,307; Referee: Martin Woods

1 February 2025 30	Morecambe	4–2	Fleetwood Town	Morecambe
15:00 GMT	Cooke 13' (pen.); Hope (yellow card) 29'; Dallas 52', 59'; Dackers 86'; Taylor (yellow card) 89'	Report	Lynch (yellow card) 33'; Bolton 41', (yellow card) 88'; Bonds (yellow card) 58'; Virtue 75', (yellow card) 88'	Stadium: Mazuma Mobile Stadium; Attendance: 3,522; Referee: Edward Duckworth

8 February 2025 31	Fleetwood Town	2–0	Cheltenham Town	Fleetwood
15:00 GMT	Virtue 44'; Cover (yellow card) 74'; Rooney (yellow card) 89'; Helm 90+2'; Bennett (yellow card) 90+4'	Report	Stubbs (yellow card) 62'	Stadium: Highbury Stadium; Attendance: 2,257; Referee: Aaron Bannister

11 February 2025 16	Tranmere Rovers	0–0	Fleetwood Town	Birkenhead
19:45 GMT	Davison (yellow card) 75'	Report	Neal (yellow card) 29'; Sarpong-Wiredu (yellow card) 45'; Lynch (yellow card) 75'	Stadium: Prenton Park; Attendance: 4,621; Referee: Adam Herczeg
Note: Fixture was originally scheduled for 16 November, but was postponed due to international call-ups.

15 February 2025 32	Bromley	1–0	Fleetwood Town	Bromley
15:00 GMT	Cheek 46', (yellow card) 78'	Report	Rooney (yellow card) 25'; Potter (yellow card) 90'	Stadium: Hayes Lane; Attendance: 2,474; Referee: Matthew Russell

18 February 2025 25	Fleetwood Town	0–0	AFC Wimbledon	Fleetwood
19:45 GMT	Bennett (yellow card) 15'; Bonds (yellow card) 77'	Report		Stadium: Highbury Stadium; Attendance: 2,106; Referee: Paul Howard
Note: Fixture was originally scheduled for 4 January, but was moved due to Wimbledon playing the Thursday prior. The match was then postponed on that date due to heavy snowfall.

22 February 2025 33	Grimsby Town	2–1	Fleetwood Town	Cleethorpes
15:00 GMT	McEachran 23'; Rose 64'; Wilson (yellow card) 90+7'	Report	Bennett (yellow card) 40'; Mayor (yellow card) 45+2'; Graydon (yellow card) 60', (goal) 61'; Wiredu (yellow card) 63'; Rooney (yellow card) 66'; Bolton (yellow card) 90+4'	Stadium: Blundell Park; Attendance: 5,996; Referee: Scott Tallis

25 February 2025 26	Gillingham	1–2	Fleetwood Town	Gillingham
19:45 GMT	Nevitt 39'		Helm 45'; Graydon 50'	Stadium: Priestfield Stadium; Attendance: 5,370; Referee: Alan Young
Note: Fixture was originally scheduled for 11 January, but was postponed due to a frozen pitch.

1 March 2025 34	Fleetwood Town	2–2	Notts County	Fleetwood
15:00 GMT	Cover (yellow card) 33'; Graydon (yellow card) 39', (goal) 68' (pen.), 70'	Report	Abbott 16', (yellow card) 90+7'; Tsaroulla (yellow card) 27'; Gordon (yellow card) 42'; Platt (yellow card) 64'; Jatta 90'; Whitaker (yellow card) 90+4'	Stadium: Highbury Stadium; Attendance: 3,555; Referee: Seb Stockbridge

4 March 2025 35	Crewe Alexandra	1–4	Fleetwood Town	Crewe
19:45 GMT	O'Riordan (yellow card) 55'; Long 90+1'	Report	Graydon 11'; Marsh 33'; Bennett 79'; Patterson 89'	Stadium: Gresty Road; Referee: Benjamin Speedie

8 March 2025 36	Fleetwood Town	1–1	Port Vale	Fleetwood
14:00 GMT	Graydon 81'	Report	Tolaj 90+6'	Stadium: Highbury Stadium; Attendance: 3,501; Referee: Robert Madley

15 March 2025 37	Colchester United	3–0	Fleetwood Town	Colchester
15:00 GMT	Taylor 55'; Edwards 59'; Payne 85'; Gordon (yellow card) 89'	Report	Hunt (yellow card) 47'	Stadium: Colchester Community Stadium; Attendance: 5,636; Referee: Carl Brook

22 March 2025 38	Fleetwood Town	0–0	Tranmere Rovers	Fleetwood
15:00 GMT	Bolton (yellow card) 50'	Report	Bradshaw (yellow card) 90+2'	Stadium: Highbury Stadium; Attendance: 3,421; Referee: Alex Chilowicz

29 March 2025 39	Milton Keynes Dons	2–4	Fleetwood Town	Denbigh
15:00 GMT	Orsi 27'; Hogan 83'	Report	Neal (yellow card) 16'; Virtue 45'; Bolton 49'; Marsh 59'; Rooney (yellow card) 66'; Devonport 71'	Stadium: Stadium MK; Attendance: 6,273; Referee: Anthony Backhouse

1 April 2025 40	Accrington Stanley	1–4	Fleetwood Town	Accrington
19:45 BST	Grant (yellow card) 39'; Ward (yellow card) 45+3'; Woods 52'; Batty (yellow card) 90+2'	Report	Helm 9'; Wiredu (yellow card) 27'; Marsh (yellow card) 31'; Patterson 62'; Grant 85' (o.g.); Hunt 90'	Stadium: Crown Ground; Attendance: 1,987; Referee: Darren Drysdale

5 April 2025 41	Fleetwood Town	0–4	Swindon Town	Fleetwood
15:00 BST	Bennett (yellow card) 36'; Devonport (yellow card) 44'; Sarpong-Wiredu (yellow card) 46'	Report	Tshimanga 38' (pen.), (yellow card) 45'; Freckleton 47'; Bennett 75' (o.g.); Ofoborh 88'	Stadium: Highbury Stadium; Attendance: 2,742; Referee: Stuart Morland

12 April 2025 42	Chesterfield	3–0	Fleetwood Town	Chesterfield
15:00 BST	Colclough 55'; Palmer 69'; Madden 78'	Report	Helm (yellow card) 14'	Stadium: SMH Group Stadium; Attendance: 7,739; Referee: Ross Joyce

18 April 2025 43	Fleetwood Town	0–0	Barrow	Fleetwood
15:00 BST	Neal (yellow card) 14'; Potter (yellow card) 38'; Rooney (yellow card) 51'	Report	Acquah (yellow card) 51'; Whitfield (yellow card) 60'	Stadium: Highbury Stadium; Referee: Stephen Parkinson

21 April 2025 44	Harrogate Town	3–1	Fleetwood Town	Harrogate
15:00 BST	Asare (yellow card) 10'; Moon 56'; Taylor 61'; Fox (yellow card) 78'; Cursons 90+6'	Report	Moore (yellow card) 19' (goal) 51'; Bennett (yellow card) 48'	Stadium: Wetherby Road; Attendance: 3,081; Referee: Scott Simpson

26 April 2025 45	Fleetwood Town	2–0	Newport County	Fleetwood
15:00 BST	Patterson 10'; Virtue (yellow card) 31'; Medley 74', (yellow card) 76'	Report	Antwi (yellow card) 82'	Stadium: Highbury Stadium; Attendance: 2,469; Referee: Peter Wright

3 May 2025 46	Bradford City	1–0	Fleetwood Town	Bradford
15:00 BST	Sarcevic (yellow card) 45', (goal) 90+6'	Report	Potter (yellow card) 45+1'; Medley (yellow card) 74'	Stadium: Valley Parade; Attendance: 24,033; Referee: Martin Coy

=== FA Cup ===
Fleetwood Town were drawn away to Reading in the first round.

Win Draw Loss Fixtures

2 November 2024 First round	Reading	2–0	Fleetwood Town	Reading
15:00 GMT	Rushesha (yellow card) 8'; Bindon 48'; Odubeko 86' (o.g.)	Report		Stadium: Madejski Stadium; Attendance: 3,685; Referee: Paul Howard

=== EFL Cup ===
As an EFL League Two side, Fleetwood entered the EFL Cup in the first round, where they were drawn at home against Championship side West Bromwich Albion on 27 June. In the second round, they were drawn at home to Rotherham United. In the third round, they were drawn away to Stoke City.

Win Draw Loss Fixtures

13 August 2024 First round	Fleetwood Town	2–1	West Bromwich Albion	Fleetwood
19:45 BST	Graydon 12'; Coughlan 33'; Mayor (yellow card) 72'; Broom (yellow card) 79'	Report	Faal 8'; Frabotta (yellow card) 51'; Nelson (yellow card) 85'	Stadium: Highbury Stadium; Attendance: 2,611; Referee: Thomas Kirk

27 August 2024 Second round	Fleetwood Town	2–1	Rotherham United	Fleetwood
19:45 BST	Graydon 16', 29'; Sarpong-Wiredu (yellow card) 50'; Lonergan (yellow card) 56'; Virtue (yellow card) 64'; Bonds (yellow card) 87'	Report	McCart 2'; Odoffin (yellow card) 86'; Clarke-Harris (yellow card) 88'	Stadium: Highbury Stadium; Attendance: 1,744; Referee: Ross Joyce

17 September 2024 Third round	Stoke City	1–1 (2–1 p)	Fleetwood Town	Stoke-on-Trent
19:30 BST	Thompson (yellow card) 18'; Bae Jun-ho (yellow card) 33'; Manhoef (yellow card) 45+4'; Rose 54'; Johansson (yellow card) 89'	Report	Helm (yellow card) 28'; Mayor (yellow card) 45+4'; Bolton (yellow card) 57'; Bennett 90+1'	Stadium: Bet365 Stadium; Attendance: 8,927; Referee: Tim Robinson
	Penalties
	Cannon (penalty missed); Tezgel (penalty scored); Sidibe (penalty scored); Burger (penalty missed)		(penalty missed) Patterson; (penalty missed) Graydon; (penalty missed) Odubeko; (penalty scored) Bonds; (penalty missed) Broom

=== EFL Trophy ===
In the group stage, Fleetwood were drawn into Northern Group D alongside Barrow, Bolton Wanderers and Aston Villa U21.

Pos	Div	Team	Pld	W	PW	PL	L	GF	GA	GD	Pts	Qualification
1	L1	Bolton Wanderers	3	2	0	1	0	6	4	+2	7	Advance to Round 2
2	ACA	Aston Villa U21	3	1	1	0	1	4	6	−2	5	Advance to Round 2
3	L2	Fleetwood Town	3	1	0	0	2	6	5	+1	3	
4	L2	Barrow	3	1	0	0	2	5	6	−1	3	

Source: EFL

Win Draw Loss Fixtures

3 September 2024 Group stage	Fleetwood Town	2–3	Aston Villa U21	Fleetwood
19:00 BST	Lynch (yellow card) 38'; Coughlan 53'; Odubeko 58'; Smith (yellow card) 61'; Hughes (yellow card) 84'	Report	Buendía 28', 40'; Pierre 88'	Stadium: Highbury Stadium; Attendance: 726; Referee: Zac Kennard-Kettle
Note: Fixture was initially scheduled for 27 August, but was moved due to the EFL Cup progression.

8 October 2024 Group stage	Fleetwood Town	3–0	Barrow	Fleetwood
19:00 BST	Broom (yellow card) 15'; Harratt 24', 35'; Smith 84'	Report	Dallas (yellow card) 59'; Eccleston (yellow card) 72'	Stadium: Highbury Stadium; Attendance: 734; Referee: James Westgate

12 November 2024 Group stage	Bolton Wanderers	2–1	Fleetwood Town	Horwich
19:45 GMT	Collins 26', 90+1'; Forrester (yellow card) 75'	Report	Hughes (yellow card) 24'; Graydon 52'; Patterson (yellow card) 87'	Stadium: Toughsheet Community Stadium; Attendance: 1,607; Referee: Elliot Bell

== Statistics ==
=== Appearances and goals ===
As of match played 21 April 2025

Players with no appearances are not included on the list
Italics indicate a loaned in player

No.	Pos	Nat	Player	Total		League Two		FA Cup		EFL Cup		EFL Trophy	
No.	Pos	Nat	Player	Apps	Goals	Apps	Goals	Apps	Goals	Apps	Goals	Apps	Goals
1	GK	(Republic of Ireland) IRL	David Harrington	21	0	20+0	0	1+0	0	0+0	0	0+0	0
2	MF	(Jamaica) JAM	Brandon Cover	8	0	4+4	0	0+0	0	0+0	0	0+0	0
3	DF	(England) ENG	Zech Medley	6	0	3+2	0	0+0	0	1+0	0	0+0	0
4	MF	(England) ENG	Brendan Sarpong-Wiredu	37	2	34+0	2	0+0	0	3+0	0	0+0	0
5	DF	(England) ENG	James Bolton	39	4	33+3	4	0+0	0	1+0	0	1+1	0
6	MF	(Guyana) GUY	Elliot Bonds	34	0	28+2	0	1+0	0	3+0	0	0+0	0
7	FW	(Republic of Ireland) IRL	Ryan Graydon	38	13	33+1	9	1+0	0	2+0	3	1+0	1
8	MF	(England) ENG	Matty Virtue	45	9	31+8	9	1+0	0	3+0	0	1+1	0
10	MF	(England) ENG	Danny Mayor	43	2	29+10	2	1+0	0	3+0	0	0+0	0
11	MF	(Wales) WAL	Ryan Broom	31	2	9+16	2	0+1	0	1+1	0	3+0	0
13	GK	(England) ENG	Jay Lynch	30	0	24+1	0	0+0	0	3+0	0	2+0	0
14	FW	(Republic of Ireland) IRL	Tommy Lonergan	10	0	2+4	0	0+1	0	0+2	0	1+0	0
15	DF	(England) ENG	Rhys Bennett	35	1	25+8	1	0+0	0	0+0	0	2+0	0
16	DF	(United Arab Emirates) UAE	MacKenzie Hunt	38	1	28+9	1	0+0	0	1+0	0	0+0	0
17	MF	(England) ENG	Mark Helm	49	7	30+12	7	1+0	0	2+1	0	3+0	0
18	DF	(England) ENG	Harrison Holgate	9	0	5+0	0	0+0	0	3+0	0	0+1	0
19	FW	(Republic of Ireland) IRL	Ronan Coughlan	27	10	21+2	8	1+0	0	2+0	1	1+0	1
20	MF	(England) ENG	Harrison Neal	19	0	12+7	0	0+0	0	0+0	0	0+0	0
21	FW	(England) ENG	Louie Marsh	16	2	11+5	2	0+0	0	0+0	0	0+0	0
23	MF	(Scotland) SCO	George Morrison	5	0	1+4	0	0+0	0	0+0	0	0+0	0
24	DF	(England) ENG	Will Johnson	1	0	0+1	0	0+0	0	0+0	0	0+0	0
25	DF	(England) ENG	Finley Potter	30	0	18+8	0	1+0	0	0+0	0	3+0	0
26	DF	(Scotland) SCO	Shaun Rooney	18	2	17+1	2	0+0	0	0+0	0	0+0	0
27	FW	(England) ENG	Kobei Moore	9	1	2+7	1	0+0	0	0+0	0	0+0	0
28	FW	(England) ENG	Finlay Cross-Adair	1	0	0+0	0	0+0	0	0+0	0	0+1	0
30	FW	(England) ENG	Mikey Lane	1	0	0+1	0	0+0	0	0+0	0	0+0	0
31	MF	(England) ENG	Owen Devonport	23	1	9+13	1	0+0	0	0+0	0	0+1	0
32	DF	(England) ENG	Kayden Hughes	13	2	7+1	2	1+0	0	1+1	0	1+1	0
33	MF	(England) ENG	Pele Smith	3	1	0+1	0	0+0	0	0+0	0	1+1	1
34	MF	(England) ENG	Liam Roberts	2	0	0+0	0	0+0	0	0+0	0	2+0	0
35	MF	(England) ENG	Reece Wilkes	1	0	0+0	0	0+0	0	0+0	0	0+1	0
36	MF	(England) ENG	Zack Littler	1	0	0+0	0	0+0	0	0+0	0	1+0	0
37	GK	(England) ENG	Luke Hewitson	1	0	0+0	0	0+0	0	0+0	0	1+0	0
38	MF	(England) ENG	Crispin McLean	1	0	0+0	0	0+0	0	0+0	0	0+1	0
39	DF	(Montserrat) MSR	Raff Cirino	1	0	0+0	0	0+0	0	0+0	0	1+0	0
44	FW	(Scotland) SCO	Phoenix Patterson	44	2	20+17	2	1+0	0	2+1	0	3+0	0
Player(s) who featured but departed the club permanently during the season:
2	DF	(Northern Ireland) NIR	Carl Johnston	24	1	19+0	1	1+0	0	2+1	0	1+0	0
9	FW	(England) ENG	Kian Harratt	24	3	2+18	1	0+1	0	0+0	0	2+1	2
20	FW	(Republic of Ireland) IRL	Mipo Odubeko	10	1	0+5	0	0+1	0	0+1	0	1+2	1
26	MF	(England) ENG	Liam Shaw	14	0	6+5	0	0+1	0	0+0	0	1+1	0
