= Muhammad Oladiti =

Irish footballer (born 2008)

Personal information
- Full name: Muhammad Oladiti
- Date of birth: 25 March 2008 (age 18)
- Place of birth: Waterford, Ireland
- Position: Midfielder

Team information
- Current team: Fleetwood Town
- Number: 39

Youth career
- –2021: Southend United Waterford
- 2021–2025: Shamrock Rovers
- 2025–2026: Waterford
- 2026–: Fleetwood Town

Senior career*
Years	Team	Apps	(Gls)
2024	Shamrock Rovers	0	(0)
2026	Waterford	0	(0)
2026	→ Wexford (loan)	5	(0)
2026–	Fleetwood Town	0	(0)

International career^{‡}
2022–2023	Republic of Ireland U15	13	(0)
2023–2024	Republic of Ireland U16	9	(0)
2024	Republic of Ireland U17	3	(0)
2025–	Republic of Ireland U19	8	(0)
- * Club domestic league appearances and goals as of 23:10, 11 November 2026 (UTC) ‡ National team caps and goals as of 14:41, 15 November 2026 (UTC)

Muhammad Oladiti (born 25 March 2008) is an Irish professional footballer who plays as a midfielder for EFL League Two club Fleetwood Town.

== Club career ==
=== Early career ===
Waterford native Oladiti began playing with local club Southend United Waterford, earning a place in the Waterford Schoolboys League representative side for the Kennedy Cup tournament in 2021, where his performances saw him impress enough to sign for the academy at League of Ireland club Shamrock Rovers. On 31 January 2024, he featured in a youthful Rovers side in a 5–1 defeat to Maynooth Town in the Leinster Senior Cup. In July 2025, he signed for the academy of his hometown club Waterford, initially playing for their U20 side.

=== Waterford ===
On 27 November 2025, Oladiti signed his first professional contract with Waterford, signing a multi-year deal. On 17 January 2026, he made his senior debut for the club and scored his first goal in senior football, in a 3–1 win over Riverstown in the Munster Senior Cup.

==== Wexford loan ====
In February 2026, Oladiti was loaned out to League of Ireland First Division club Wexford, where he made 5 appearances during his loan spell before returning to Waterford in July 2026.

=== Fleetwood Town ===
On 10 July 2026, Oladiti signed for Waterford's sister club, EFL League Two side Fleetwood Town on a permanent basis. On 22 September 2026, he made his debut for the club, in a 1–0 defeat to Oldham Athletic in the EFL Trophy.

== International career ==
Oladiti has represented the Republic of Ireland at U15, U16, U17 & U19 level.

== Career statistics ==
As of match played on 22 September 2026

Appearances and goals by club, season and competition
Club	Season	League			National Cup (Note: Includes FAI Cup & FA Cup)		League Cup (Note: Includes EFL Cup)		Other		Total	
Club	Season	Division	Apps	Goals	Apps	Goals	Apps	Goals	Apps	Goals	Apps	Goals
Shamrock Rovers	2024	LOI Premier Division	0	0	0	0	–		1 (Note: Appearances in the Leinster Senior Cup)	0	1	0
Waterford	2026	LOI Premier Division	0	0	0	0	–		3 (Note: Appearances in the Munster Senior Cup)	1	3	1
Wexford (loan)	2026	LOI First Division	5	0	–		–		–		5	0
Fleetwood Town	2026–27	EFL League Two	0	0	0	0	0	0	1 (Note: Appearances in the EFL Trophy)	0	1	0
Career total			5	0	0	0	0	0	5	1	10	1
