= Mackenzie Hunt =

Footballer (born 2001)

Personal information
- Full name: Mackenzie James Hunt
- Date of birth: 14 November 2001 (age 25)
- Place of birth: Liverpool, England
- Height: 1.73 m (5 ft 8 in)
- Positions: Defender; midfielder

Team information
- Current team: Baniyas
- Number: 21

Youth career
- 2007–2008: Everton
- 2015–2024: Everton

Senior career*
Years	Team	Apps	(Gls)
2024–2025	Fleetwood Town	39	(1)
2025–	Baniyas	20	(0)

International career^{‡}
2024–	United Arab Emirates	8	(0)
- * Club domestic league appearances and goals as of 07:32, 13 August 2026 (UTC) ‡ National team caps and goals as of 20:17, 11 December 2025 (UTC)

Mackenzie James Hunt (Arabic: ماكنزي جيمس هانت, born 14 November 2001) is a professional footballer who plays as a defender and midfielder for Emirati club Baniyas. Born in England, he plays for the United Arab Emirates national team.

== Club career ==
Hunt initially joined Everton aged 6, but moved to Dubai with his family before returning to Everton aged 13. He never made an appearance for the club and joined Fleetwood Town in July 2024.

In August 2025 he signed for Emirati club Baniyas.

== International career ==
Hunt is eligible to play for the UAE due to living in Dubai for seven years and obtaining citizenship. On 30 August 2024, Hunt was called up to the United Arab Emirates national team to take part in the 2026 FIFA World Cup qualification matches. He made his debut on 5 September 2024, coming on as an 88th-minute substitute against Qatar.

== Career statistics ==
As of match played 3 May 2025

Appearances and goals by club, season and competition
Club	Season	League			FA Cup		League Cup		Other		Total	
Club	Season	Division	Apps	Goals	Apps	Goals	Apps	Goals	Apps	Goals	Apps	Goals
Everton U21	2022–23	–	–		–		–		5 (Note: Appearances in EFL Trophy)	1	5	1
Everton U21	2023–24	–	–		–		–		3	0	3	0
Everton U21	Total		–		–		–		8	1	8	1
Fleetwood Town	2024–25	League Two	39	1	0	0	1	0	0	0	40	1
Career total			39	1	0	0	1	0	8	1	48	2
