= Jesse Dempsey =

Irish footballer (born 2005)

Personal information
- Full name: Jesse Joe Dempsey
- Date of birth: 15 January 2005 (age 21)
- Place of birth: Wexford, Ireland
- Height: 1.83 m (6 ft 0 in)
- Position: Left back

Team information
- Current team: Fleetwood Town (on loan from Waterford)
- Number: 36

Youth career
- –2020: Wexford Albion
- 2020: Wexford
- 2021–2022: Waterford
- 2023: UCD
- 2024: Waterford

Senior career*
Years	Team	Apps	(Gls)
2023	UCD	21	(0)
2024	Lecce	0	(0)
2024–	Waterford	20	(1)
2026–	→ Fleetwood Town (loan)	0	(0)

International career^{‡}
2023	Republic of Ireland U19	3	(0)
- * Club domestic league appearances and goals as of 16:30, 1 September 2026 (UTC) ‡ National team caps and goals as of 16:30, 1 September 2026 (UTC)

Jesse Joe Dempsey (born 15 January 2005) is an Irish professional footballer who plays as a left back for club Fleetwood Town, on loan from League of Ireland Premier Division club Waterford.

== Club career ==
=== Youth career ===
Wexford native Dempsey attended school at Wexford CBS and started playing football with Wexford Albion, where he earned a move to the academy of local League of Ireland club Wexford FC in 2020 and played there for a season, then spent two years at Waterford's academy before joining UCD's Under-19 side in 2023.

=== UCD ===
Dempsey made his debut in senior football on 17 February 2023, playing the full 90 minutes in UCD's 1–1 draw away to Dundalk in the first game of the season at Oriel Park. He made 23 appearances in all competitions with the club in what was his first season in senior football in 2023.

=== Lecce ===
On 8 January 2024, Dempsey signed for Serie A club Lecce, turning down other options in Ireland and the UK in favour of the move to Italy.

=== Waterford ===
On 16 July 2024, Dempsey returned to Waterford, where he had previously played in the club's academy, playing for their Under-20 side initially before breaking into the first team in pre-season of 2025. On 17 January 2025, Dempsey made his senior debut for the club, in a 1–0 win over Bandon in the Munster Senior Cup. On 10 July 2025, he signed his first professional contract with the club, signing a multi-year contract. On 5 October 2025, Dempsey scored his first goal in senior football, helping his side to a crucial 2–0 victory away to Drogheda United in their fight against relegation.

==== Fleetwood Town loan ====
On 31 July 2026, Dempsey signed for Waterford's sister club EFL League Two side Fleetwood Town on a season-long loan deal.

== International career ==
In September 2023, Dempsey received his first international call-up for the Republic of Ireland U19 side. On 9 September 2023, he made his debut for the side in a 1–0 defeat to Bosnia and Herzegovina U19.

== Career statistics ==
As of match played on 6 October 2026

Appearances and goals by club, season and competition
Club	Season	League			National cup (Note: Includes FAI Cup and FA Cup)		League cup (Note: Includes EFL Cup)		Other		Total	
Club	Season	Division	Apps	Goals	Apps	Goals	Apps	Goals	Apps	Goals	Apps	Goals
UCD	2023	LOI Premier Division	21	0	2	0	–		0 (Note: Appearance(s) in the Leinster Senior Cup)	0	23	0
Lecce	2023–24	Serie A	0	0	0	0	–		–		0	0
Waterford	2024	LOI Premier Division	0	0	0	0	–		0 (Note: Appearance(s) in the Munster Senior Cup)	0	0	0
Waterford	2025	LOI Premier Division	16	1	1	0	–		2	0	19	1
Waterford	2026	LOI Premier Division	4	0	1	0	–		2	0	7	0
Waterford	Total		20	1	2	0	–		4	0	26	1
Fleetwood Town (loan)	2026–27	EFL League Two	0	0	0	0	0	0	2 (Note: Appearance(s) in the EFL Trophy)	0	2	0
Career total			41	1	4	0	0	0	6	0	51	1
