= Aaron Loupalo-Bi =

English footballer (born 2005)

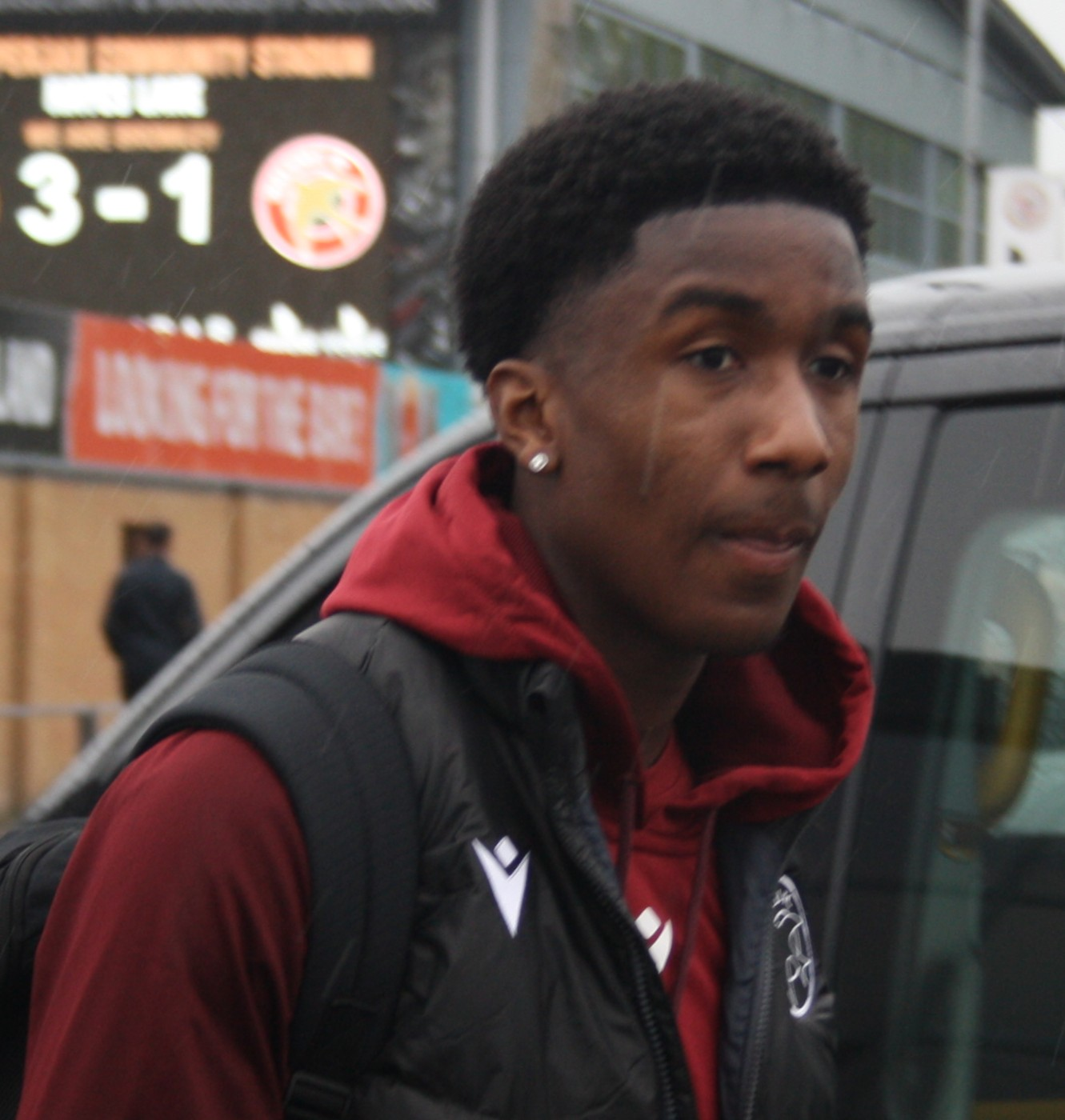
- Loupalo-Bi in 2026

Personal information
- Full name: Aaron Bradley Loupalo-Bi
- Date of birth: 7 November 2005 (age 21)
- Place of birth: Lambeth, England
- Height: 1.85 m (6 ft 1 in)
- Position: Forward

Team information
- Current team: Fleetwood Town (on loan from Fulham)
- Number: 20

Youth career
- –2024: Fulham

Senior career*
Years	Team	Apps	(Gls)
2024–	Fulham	0	(0)
2025	→ Dagenham & Redbridge (loan)	20	(1)
2026	→ Walsall (loan)	16	(1)
2026–	→ Fleetwood Town (loan)	14	(3)

International career^{‡}
2023	England U18	3	(0)
- * Club domestic league appearances and goals as of 14:00, 22 November 2026 (UTC) ‡ National team caps and goals as of 13 June 2023 (UTC)

Aaron Bradley Loupalo-Bi (born 7 November 2005) is an English professional footballer who plays as a forward for EFL League Two club Fleetwood Town, on loan from Premier League club Fulham.

== Club career ==
Loupalo-Bi joined Fulham at under-9 level, and joined Dagenham & Redbridge on loan in January 2025.

He signed a new contract with Fulham in September 2025, moving on loan to Walsall in January 2026. He initially struggled to adapt to Walsall's style of play, but after Darren Byfield replaced Mat Sadler as head coach and changed the formation, Loupalo-Bi began starting matches as part of a forward three.

In August 2026 he signed on loan for Fleetwood Town. On 27 October 2026, Loupalo-Bi scored Fleetwood's only goal in their EFL Cup fourth round fixture against Premier League team Arsenal; Fleetwood eventually won the match on penalties to reach their first ever EFL Cup quarterfinal.

== International career ==
He is an England youth international.

== Career statistics ==
As of match played 21 November 2026

Appearances and goals by club, season and competition
Club	Season	League			FA Cup		League Cup		Other		Total	
Club	Season	Division	Apps	Goals	Apps	Goals	Apps	Goals	Apps	Goals	Apps	Goals
Fulham U21	2023–24	—			—		—		3 (Note: Appearances in EFL Trophy)	1	3	1
Fulham U21	2024–25	—			—		—		3	0	3	0
Fulham U21	2025–26	—			—		—		3	1	3	1
Fulham	2024–25	Premier League	0	0	0	0	0	0	—		0	0
Fulham	2025–26	Premier League	0	0	0	0	0	0	—		0	0
Fulham	2026–27	Premier League	0	0	0	0	0	0	—		0	0
Fulham	Total		0	0	0	0	0	0	0	0	0	0
Dagenham & Redbridge (loan)	2024–25	National League	20	1	0	0	—		0	0	20	1
Walsall (loan)	2025–26	League Two	16	1	0	0	0	0	0	0	16	1
Fleetwood Town (loan)	2026–27	League Two	14	3	1	0	3	1	2	1	20	5
Career total			50	5	1	0	3	1	11	3	65	9
