= Zack Littler =

English footballer (born 2005)

Personal information
- Full name: Zack Littler
- Date of birth: 19 May 2005 (age 21)
- Place of birth: Blackpool, England
- Position: Midfielder

Team information
- Current team: Fleetwood Town
- Number: 36

Youth career
- 2013–2024: Blackpool

Senior career*
Years	Team	Apps	(Gls)
2024–	Fleetwood Town	0	(0)
- * Club domestic league appearances and goals as of 18:31, 15 October 2024 (UTC)

Zack Littler (born 19 May 2005) is an English professional footballer who plays as a midfielder for EFL League Two club Fleetwood Town.

== Career ==
Littler spent his youth with Blackpool, though struggled with injuries towards the end of his time at Bloomfield Road. Following a successful trial that lasted a number of months, he joined the development squad at Fleetwood Town.

== Career statistics ==
As of match played 8 October 2024

Appearances and goals by club, season and competition
Club	Season	League			FA Cup		EFL Cup		Other		Total	
Club	Season	Division	Apps	Goals	Apps	Goals	Apps	Goals	Apps	Goals	Apps	Goals
Fleetwood Town	2024–25	EFL League Two	0	0	0	0	0	0	1 (Note: Appearance(s) in the EFL Trophy)	0	1	0
Career total			0	0	0	0	0	0	1	0	1	0
