= Pele Smith =

English footballer (born 200?)

Personal information
- Full name: Pele Leron Smith
- Date of birth: 14 December 2007 (age 18)
- Height: 1.78 m (5 ft 10 in)
- Position: Central midfielder

Team information
- Current team: Fleetwood Town
- Number: 31

Youth career
- 2018–2026: Fleetwood Town

Senior career*
Years	Team	Apps	(Gls)
2024–	Fleetwood Town	1	(0)
- * Club domestic league appearances and goals as of 23:16, 14 October 2024 (UTC)

Pele Leron Smith is an English footballer who plays as a midfielder for EFL League Two club Fleetwood Town.

== Career ==
Smith came through the Fleetwood Town Academy, starting his career at under-10 level in 2018. He made his debut for the under-21's as a 16 year old in the 2023–24 Premier League Cup campaign. to be given squad number 33 for the 2024–25 season. He captained the under-17 team to the Premier Development League trophy with a 3–2 victory over Watford in April 2024. Smith signed a two-year scholarship with Fleetwood in the summer of 2024, taking over the captaincy from Kayden Hughes who had been promoted to the first team. After impressing during pre-season and for the Academy, he was handed his first team debut aged 16 by manager, Charlie Adam, on 3 September 2024 in the 3–2 EFL Trophy defeat to Aston Villa U21. He scored his first senior goal a month later in a 3–0 victory over Barrow in the EFL Trophy. On 2 January 2025, Smith signed his first professional contract with the club following turning seventeen.

== Career statistics ==
As of match played 8 October 2024

Appearances and goals by club, season and competition
Club	Season	League			FA Cup		EFL Cup		Other		Total	
Club	Season	Division	Apps	Goals	Apps	Goals	Apps	Goals	Apps	Goals	Apps	Goals
Fleetwood Town	2024–25	League Two	1	0	0	0	0	0	2 (Note: Appearance(s) in EFL Trophy)	1	3	1
Career total			1	0	0	0	0	0	2	1	3	1
