= Rhys Bennett (footballer, born 2003) =

English association football player

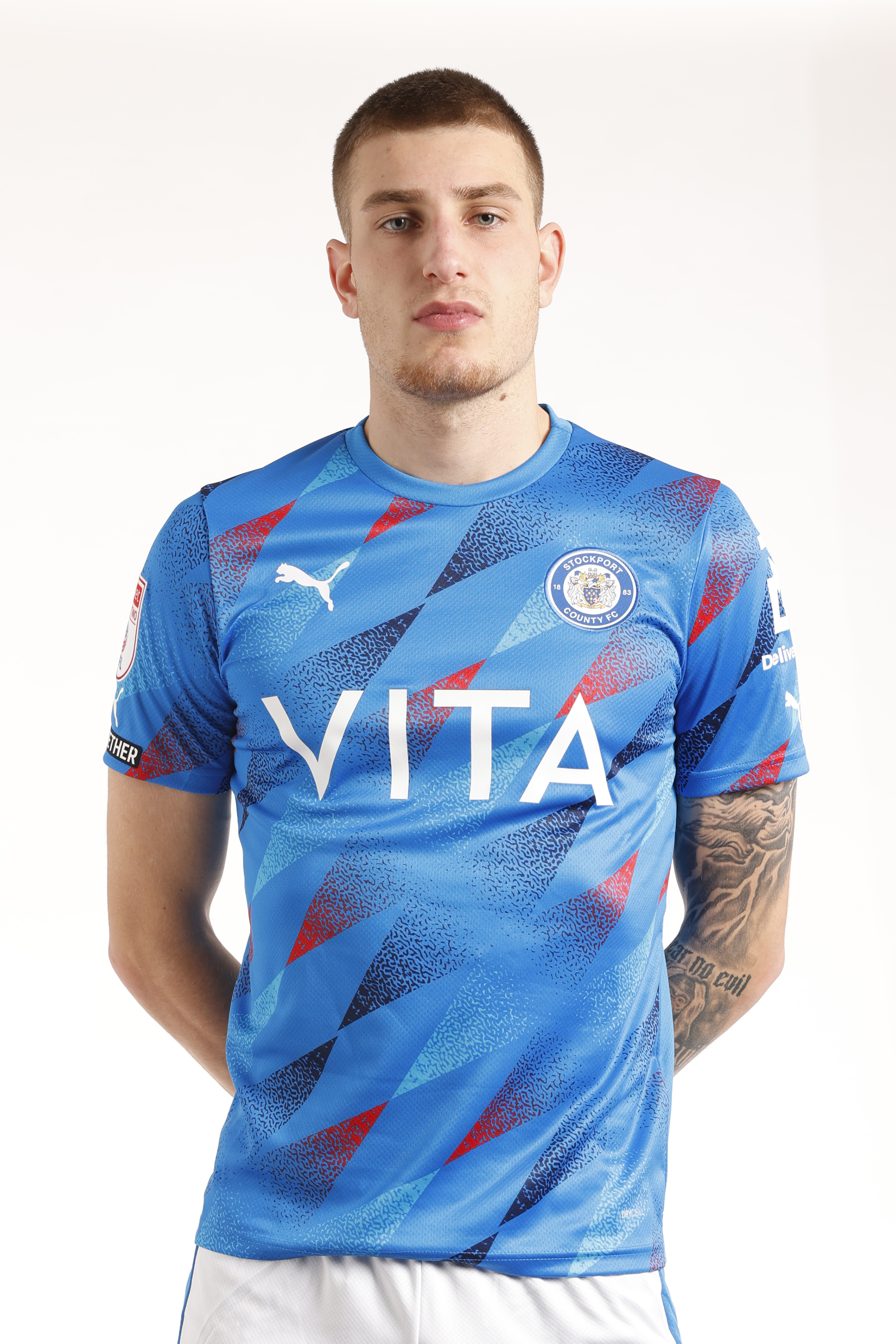
- Bennett with Stockport County in 2023/24

Personal information
- Full name: Rhys Joseph Wright Bennett
- Date of birth: 30 October 2003 (age 23)
- Place of birth: Denton, England
- Height: 6 ft 2 in (1.87 m)
- Position: Defender

Team information
- Current team: Fleetwood Town
- Number: 2

Youth career
- –2023: Manchester United

Senior career*
Years	Team	Apps	(Gls)
2023–2026	Manchester United	0	(0)
2024	→ Stockport County (loan)	1	(0)
2024–2025	→ Fleetwood Town (loan)	35	(1)
2026–	Fleetwood Town	3	(0)
- * Club domestic league appearances and goals as of 17:12, 11 April 2026 (UTC)

Rhys Joseph Wright Bennett (born 30 October 2003) is an English professional footballer who plays as a defender for EFL League Two club Fleetwood Town.

== Early and personal life ==
Bennett is from Denton, Greater Manchester. He attended Stalybridge Celtic Juniors' soccer school as a six-year-old. He went to school at Russell Scott Primary School in Tameside, and Audenshaw High School.

Bennett has spoken about his father David, who committed suicide in October 2025, to help raise awareness of mental health issues.

== Career ==
=== Manchester United ===
A centre-half, Bennett is a product of the Manchester United academy having joined the club at U10 level. He signed a first professional contract with the club in 2022. Bennett captained the Manchester United U18 FA Youth Cup side to victory in the 2021–22 season. He also scored in the final, a 3–1 win over Nottingham Forest U18. He travelled with the United first team squad on their mid-season training camp to Spain in December 2022, but missed six months at the start of 2023 with injury.

In July 2023, he signed a new professional contract with the club. He was named as part of the senior United match-day side, in December 2023 in an away Premier League tie with West Ham United. In January 2024, he joined EFL League Two side Stockport County on a six-month loan. He made his Stockport league debut on 17 February 2024 against Tranmere Rovers.

On 29 August 2024, Bennett joined League Two club Fleetwood Town on a season-long loan deal.

=== Fleetwood Town ===
On 31 January 2026, Bennett re-signed for EFL League Two club Fleetwood Town for an undisclosed fee. On 27 October, Bennett played as Fleetwood knocked-out Premier League champions Arsenal to reach the quarter-finals of the 2026-27 EFL Cup. The match finished 1-1 with Fleetwood winning 5-4 in a penalty shootout. Starting the game 18th in the English fourth division, 84 placed below Arsenal, the result for Fleetwood was one of the biggest cup upsets in the history of the EFL Cup.

== Career statistics ==
=== Club ===
As of match played 11 April 2026

Appearances and goals by club, season and competition
Club	Season	League			FA Cup		EFL Cup		Europe		Other		Total	
Club	Season	Division	Apps	Goals	Apps	Goals	Apps	Goals	Apps	Goals	Apps	Goals	Apps	Goals
Manchester United U21	2021–22	—			—		—		—		0	0	0	0
Manchester United U21	2022–23	—			—		—		—		3 (Note: Appearance(s) in EFL Trophy)	0	3	0
Manchester United U21	2023–24	—			—		—		—		2	0	2	0
Manchester United U21	2025–26	—			—		—		—		1	0	1	0
Manchester United U21	Total		—		—		—		—		6	0	6	0
Manchester United	2023–24	Premier League	0	0	0	0	0	0	0	0	—		0	0
Manchester United	2024–25	Premier League	0	0	0	0	0	0	0	0	0	0	0	0
Manchester United	2025–26	Premier League	0	0	0	0	0	0	—		0	0	0	0
Manchester United	Total		0	0	0	0	0	0	0	0	0	0	0	0
Stockport County (loan)	2023–24	League Two	1	0	0	0	0	0	—		0	0	1	0
Fleetwood Town (loan)	2024–25	League Two	35	1	0	0	1	1	—		2	0	38	1
Fleetwood Town	2025–26	League Two	3	0	—		—		—		—		0	0
Career total			39	1	0	0	1	1	0	0	8	0	48	1
